= 2026 South Dakota Senate election =

- November 3, 2026

All 35 seats in the South Dakota Senate 18 seats needed for a majority
Leader	Chris Karr	Liz Larson
Party	Republican	Democratic
Leader's seat	11th–Sioux Falls	10th–Sioux Falls
Last election	78.65%, 32 seats	19.94%, 3 seats
Current seats	32	3
Seats needed	Steady	▲15
- Status of the incumbents: Republican incumbent retiring or term-limited Democratic incumbent retiring or term-limited Republican incumbent Democratic incumbent
Incumbent Senate President Pro Tempore
Chris Karr
Republican

The 2026 South Dakota Senate election was held on November 3, 2026, alongside the other 2026 United States elections. Voters elected members of the South Dakota Senate in all 35 of the U.S. state of South Dakota's legislative districts to serve a two-year term.

== Retirements ==
Senators serving continuously since the 2018 general election are ineligible to serve another consecutive term.

=== Democratic ===
1. District 15: Jamie Smith is running for mayor of Sioux Falls.
2. District 27: Red Dawn Foster is term-limited.

=== Republican ===
1. District 2: Steve Kolbeck is retiring.
2. District 12: Arch Beal withdrew his candidacy after initially filing for reelection.

== Predictions ==
Source	Ranking	As of
Sabato's Crystal Ball	Safe R	January 22, 2026
State Navigate	Safe R	October 24, 2026

== Overview ==
2026 South Dakota Senate election results and statistics
Party	Candidates		Seats won	Aggregate votes		2024 general		Change	
Party	Prim.	Gen.	Seats won	No.	Percent	Seats won	Vote %	Seats	Vote %
Republican	59	34	TBD	TBD		32	78.65%	TBD	
Democratic	11	10	TBD	TBD		3	19.94%	TBD	
Independents		3	TBD	TBD		0	1.41%	TBD	
Totals	70	47	35	TBD	100%	35	—	—	—
Turnout				TBD		—	69.93%	TBD	
Registered voters				TBD					

== Detailed results ==
=== District 1 ===
District 1 election
Nominee	Michael Rohl
Party	Republican
Senator before election
Michael Rohl
Republican
Elected Senator
TBD

The incumbent senator for District 1 is Republican Michael Rohl, first elected in 2020. At the 2024 general election, he was re-elected unopposed. He is running for re-election. Should he win another term, he will be ineligible to run in 2028.

==== Republican primary ====
===== Nominee =====
- Michael Rohl, incumbent senator

=== District 2 ===
District 2 election
Nominee	John Sjaarda
Party	Republican
Senator before election
Steve Kolbeck
Republican
Elected Senator
TBD

The incumbent senator for District 2 is Republican Steve Kolbeck, first elected in 2022. At the 2024 general election, he was re-elected unopposed. He is retiring.

==== Republican primary ====
===== Nominee =====
- John Sjaarda, state representative from this district (2023–present)

===== Eliminated in primary =====
- David Kull, state representative from this district (2023–present)

===== Withdrawn =====
- Manuel Luschas (running for state representative)

===== Declined =====
- Steve Kolbeck, incumbent senator (running for Republican precinct committeman in Minnehaha County)

===== Results =====
District 2 election, Republican primary Unofficial results
Party	Candidate	Votes	%
Republican	John Sjaarda	2,309	62.07%
Republican	David Kull	1,411	37.93%
Total votes		3,720	100.00%

=== District 3 ===
District 3 election
Nominee	Katherine Washnok
Party	Republican
Senator before election
Carl E. Perry
Republican
Elected Senator
TBD

The incumbent senator for District 3 is Republican Carl E. Perry, first elected in 2024 unopposed at the general election. He is running for re-election.

==== Republican primary ====
===== Nominee =====
- Katherine Washnok, candidate for this district in 2024

===== Eliminated in primary =====
- Carl E. Perry, incumbent senator

===== Results =====
District 3 election, Republican primary Unofficial results
Party	Candidate	Votes	%
Republican	Katherine Washnok	2,508	63.48%
Republican	Carl E. Perry (incumbent)	1,443	36.52%
Total votes		3,951	100.00%

=== District 4 ===
District 4 election
Party	Republican
Senator before election
Stephanie Sauder
Republican
Elected Senator
TBD

The incumbent senator for District 4 is Republican Stephanie Sauder, first elected in 2024 unopposed at the general election. She is running for re-election.

==== Republican primary ====
===== Nominee =====
- Stephanie Sauder, incumbent senator

===== Eliminated in primary =====
- Tim Begalka, former senator from this district (2011–2015)

===== Results =====
District 4 election, Republican primary Unofficial results
Party	Candidate	Votes	%
Republican	Stephanie Sauder (incumbent)	2,804	50.95%
Republican	Tim Begalka	2,699	49.05%
Total votes		5,503	100.00%

=== District 5 ===
District 5 election
Nominee	Glen Vilhauer
Party	Republican
Senator before election
Glen Vilhauer
Republican
Elected Senator
TBD

The incumbent senator for District 5 is Republican Glen Vilhauer, first elected in 2024 with 71.1 percent of the vote at the general election. He is running for re-election.

==== Republican primary ====
===== Nominee =====
- Glen Vilhauer, incumbent senator

===== Eliminated in primary =====
- Josephine Garcia, state representative from this district (2025–present)

===== Results =====
District 5 election, Republican primary Unofficial results
Party	Candidate	Votes	%
Republican	Glen Vilhauer (incumbent)	1,852	59.07%
Republican	Josephine Garcia	1,283	40.93%
Total votes		3,135	100.00%

=== District 6 ===
District 6 election
Nominee	Ernie Otten
Party	Republican
Senator before election
Ernie Otten
Republican
Elected Senator
TBD

The incumbent senator for District 6 is Republican Ernie Otten, first elected in 2024 unopposed at the general election, though he has previously served four terms, from 2013 to 2021. He is running for re-election.

==== Republican primary ====
===== Nominee =====
- Ernie Otten, incumbent senator

=== District 7 ===
District 7 election
Nominee	Tim Reed
Party	Republican
Senator before election
Tim Reed
Republican
Elected Senator
TBD

The incumbent senator for District 7 is Republican Tim Reed, first elected in 2022. At the 2024 general election, he was re-elected unopposed. He is running for re-election.

==== Republican primary ====
===== Nominee =====
- Tim Reed, incumbent senator

=== District 8 ===
District 8 election
Nominee	Casey Crabtree	Clint Hoyer
Party	Republican	Independent
Senator before election
Casey Crabtree
Republican
Elected Senator
TBD

The incumbent senator for District 8 is Republican Casey Crabtree, first appointed in 2020. At the 2024 general election, he was re-elected unopposed. He is running for re-election. Should he win another term, he will be ineligible to run in 2028.

==== Republican primary ====
===== Nominee =====
- Casey Crabtree, incumbent senator

===== Disqualified =====
- Patricia Shiery

===== Withdrawn =====
- Todd Wilkinson (running for state representative)

==== Independent candidates ====
===== Declared =====
- Clint Hoyer

=== District 9 ===
District 9 election
Nominee	Joy Hohn
Party	Republican
Senator before election
Joy Hohn
Republican
Elected Senator
TBD

The incumbent senator for District 9 is Republican Joy Hohn, first elected in 2024 unopposed at the general election. She is running for re-election.

==== Republican primary ====
===== Nominee =====
- Joy Hohn, incumbent senator

===== Eliminated in primary =====
- Daryl Christensen, candidate for state representative from this district in 2024

===== Results =====
District 9 election, Republican primary Unofficial results
Party	Candidate	Votes	%
Republican	Joy Hohn (incumbent)	1,626	58.49%
Republican	Daryl Christensen	1,154	41.51%
Total votes		2,780	100.00%

=== District 10 ===
District 10 election
Nominee	Liz Larson	Michael Dupic
Party	Democratic	Republican
Senator before election
Liz Larson
Democratic
Elected Senator
TBD

The incumbent senator for District 10 is Democrat Liz Larson, first elected in 2022. At the 2024 general election, she was re-elected unopposed. She is running for re-election.

==== Democratic primary ====
===== Nominee =====
- Liz Larson, incumbent senator

==== Republican primary ====
===== Nominee =====
- Michael Dupic (initial candidacy successfully challenged, but successfully petitioned again)

=== District 11 ===
District 11 election
Nominee	Chris Karr	Aaron Matson
Party	Republican	Democratic
Senator before election
Chris Karr
Republican
Elected Senator
TBD

The incumbent senator for District 11 is Republican Chris Karr, first elected in 2024 with 58.9 percent of the vote at the general election. He is running for re-election.

==== Republican primary ====
===== Nominee =====
- Chris Karr, incumbent senator

===== Eliminated in primary =====
- Graham Oey, attorney

===== Results =====
District 11 election, Republican primary Unofficial results
Party	Candidate	Votes	%
Republican	Chris Karr (incumbent)	1,587	60.92%
Republican	Graham Oey	1,018	39.08%
Total votes		2,605	100.00%

==== Democratic primary ====
===== Nominee =====
- Aaron Matson, nominee for state representative from this district in 2024 and nominee for Treasurer in 2018

=== District 12 ===
District 12 election
Nominee	Kari Shanard-Koenders	Joe Zweifel
Party	Republican	Democratic
Senator before election
Arch Beal
Republican
Elected Senator
TBD

The incumbent senator for District 12 is Republican Arch Beal, first elected in 2022. He was re-elected in 2024 with 55.7 percent of the vote at the general election. He is running for re-election.

==== Republican primary ====
===== Nominee =====
- Kari Shanard-Koenders, executive director of the state Board of Pharmacy

===== Withdrawn =====
- Arch Beal, incumbent senator

==== Democratic primary ====
===== Nominee =====
- Joe Zweifel, deputy executive director of the South Dakota Democratic Party

=== District 13 ===
District 13 election
Nominee	Sue Peterson
Party	Republican
Senator before election
Sue Peterson
Republican
Elected Senator
TBD

The incumbent senator for District 13 is Republican Sue Peterson, first elected in 2024 with 58.5 percent of the vote at the general election. She is running for re-election.

==== Republican primary ====
===== Nominee =====
- Sue Peterson, incumbent senator

===== Eliminated in primary =====
- Dan Kippley

===== Results =====
District 13 election, Republican primary Unofficial results
Party	Candidate	Votes	%
Republican	Sue Peterson (incumbent)	2,405	58.01%
Republican	Dan Kippley	1,741	41.99%
Total votes		4,146	100.00%

=== District 14 ===
District 14 election
Nominee	Larry Zikmund
Party	Republican
Senator before election
Larry Zikmund
Republican
Elected Senator
TBD

The incumbent senator for District 14 is Republican Larry Zikmund, first elected in 2020. He was re-elected in 2024 with 54.6 percent of the vote at the general election. He is running for re-election. Should he win another term, he will be ineligible to run in 2028.

==== Republican primary ====
===== Nominee =====
- Larry Zikmund, incumbent senator

===== Eliminated in primary =====
- R. Shawn Tornow, former state representative from this district (2011–2013)

===== Results =====
District 14 election, Republican primary Unofficial results
Party	Candidate	Votes	%
Republican	Larry Zikmund (incumbent)	2,449	71.92%
Republican	R. Shawn Tornow	956	28.08%
Total votes		3,405	100.00%

=== District 15 ===
District 15 election
Nominee	Erik Muckey
Party	Democratic
Senator before election
Jamie Smith
Democratic
Elected Senator
TBD

The incumbent senator for District 15 is Democrat Jamie Smith, first elected in 2024 with 52.4 percent of the vote at the general election. He is retiring.

==== Democratic primary ====
===== Nominee =====
- Erik Muckey, state representative from this district (2025–present)

===== Declined =====
- Jamie Smith, incumbent senator (running for mayor of Sioux Falls)

=== District 16 ===
District 16 election
Nominee	Kevin D. Jensen
Party	Republican
Senator before election
Kevin D. Jensen
Republican
Elected Senator
TBD

The incumbent senator for District 16 is Republican Kevin D. Jensen, first elected in 2024 unopposed at the general election. He is running for re-election.

==== Republican primary ====
===== Nominee =====
- Kevin D. Jensen, incumbent senator

=== District 17 ===
District 17 election
Nominee	Sydney Davis
Party	Republican
Senator before election
Sydney Davis
Republican
Elected Senator
TBD

The incumbent senator for District 17 is Republican Sydney Davis, first elected in 2022. She was re-elected in 2024 unopposed at the general election. She is running for re-election.

==== Republican primary ====
===== Nominee =====
- Sydney Davis, incumbent senator

===== Eliminated in primary =====
- Jeffrey Church

===== Results =====
District 17 election, Republican primary Unofficial results
Party	Candidate	Votes	%
Republican	Sydney Davis (incumbent)	1,944	76.54%
Republican	Jeffrey D. Church	596	23.46%
Total votes		2,540	100.00%

=== District 18 ===
District 18 election
Nominee	Lauren Nelson
Party	Republican
Senator before election
Lauren Nelson
Republican
Elected Senator
TBD

The incumbent senator for District 18 is Republican Lauren Nelson, first elected in 2024 with 57.2 percent of the vote at the general election. She is running for re-election, facing a primary bid from former senator Jean Hunhoff, whom she narrowly beat in the 2024 Republican primary with 52.0 percent of the vote.

==== Republican primary ====
===== Nominee =====
- Lauren Nelson, incumbent senator

===== Eliminated in primary =====
- Jean Hunhoff, former senator from this district (2021–2025)

===== Results =====
District 18 election, Republican primary Unofficial results
Party	Candidate	Votes	%
Republican	Lauren Nelson (incumbent)	1,885	53.44%
Republican	Jean Hunhoff	1,642	46.56%
Total votes		3,527	100.00%

==== Democratic primary ====
===== Nominee =====
- Kay Swihart

=== District 19 ===
District 19 election
Nominee	Kyle Schoenfish	Russell Graeff
Party	Republican	Democratic
Senator before election
Kyle Schoenfish
Republican
Elected Senator
TBD

The incumbent senator for District 19 is Republican Kyle Schoenfish, first elected in 2020. He was re-elected in 2024 with 77.2 percent of the vote at the general election. He is running for re-election. Should he win another term, he will be ineligible to run in 2028.

==== Republican primary ====
===== Nominee =====
- Kyle Schoenfish, incumbent senator

===== Eliminated in primary =====
- Donna Olson

===== Results =====
District 19 election, Republican primary Unofficial results
Party	Candidate	Votes	%
Republican	Kyle Schoenfish (incumbent)	2,985	65.81%
Republican	Donna Olson	1,551	34.19%
Total votes		4,536	100.00%

==== Democratic primary ====
===== Nominee =====
- Russell Graeff, nominee for this district in 2022 and 2016

=== District 20 ===
District 20 election
Nominee	Paul Miskimins
Party	Republican
Senator before election
Paul Miskimins
Republican
Elected Senator
TBD

The incumbent senator for District 20 is Republican Paul Miskimins, first elected in 2024 unopposed at the general election. He is running for re-election.

==== Republican primary ====
===== Nominee =====
- Paul Miskimins, incumbent senator

=== District 21 ===
District 21 election
Nominee	Mykala Voita	Dan Andersson
Party	Republican	Democratic
Senator before election
Mykala Voita
Republican
Elected Senator
TBD

The incumbent senator for District 21 is Republican Mykala Voita, first elected in 2024 with 77.1 percent of the vote at the general election. She is running for re-election, facing a primary bid from former senator Erin Tobin, whom she narrowly beat in the 2024 Republican primary with 50.7 percent of the vote.

==== Republican primary ====
===== Nominee =====
- Mykala Voita, incumbent senator

===== Eliminated in primary =====
- Erin Tobin, former senator from this district (2021–2025)

===== Results =====
District 21 election, Republican primary Unofficial results
Party	Candidate	Votes	%
Republican	Mykala Voita (incumbent)	3,273	59.04%
Republican	Erin Tobin	2,271	40.96%
Total votes		5,544	100.00%

==== Democratic primary ====
===== Nominee =====
- Dan Andersson, nominee for this district in 2022 and 2016

=== District 22 ===
District 22 election
Nominee	Brandon Wipf
Party	Republican
Senator before election
Brandon Wipf
Republican
Elected Senator
TBD

The incumbent senator for District 22 is Republican Brandon Wipf, first appointed in 2025. He replaced Republican David Wheeler, who was re-elected in 2024 with 73.2 percent of the vote at the general election. Wipf is running for re-election.

==== Republican primary ====
===== Nominee =====
- Brandon Wipf, incumbent senator

=== District 23 ===
District 23 election
Nominee	Mark Lapka
Party	Republican
Senator before election
Mark Lapka
Republican
Elected Senator
TBD

The incumbent senator for District 23 is Republican Mark Lapka, first elected in 2024 unopposed at the general election. He is running for re-election.

==== Republican primary ====
===== Nominee =====
- Mark Lapka, incumbent senator

=== District 24 ===
District 24 election
Nominee	Jim Mehlhaff
Party	Republican
Senator before election
Jim Mehlhaff
Republican
Elected Senator
TBD

The incumbent senator for District 24 is Republican Jim Mehlhaff, first elected in 2022. He was re-elected in 2024 unopposed at the general election. He is running for re-election.

==== Republican primary ====
===== Nominee =====
- Jim Mehlhaff, incumbent senator

===== Eliminated in primary =====
- Brian Murphy
- Mark Nelson

===== Results =====
District 24 election, Republican primary Unofficial results
Party	Candidate	Votes	%
Republican	Jim Mehlhaff (incumbent)	3,391	55.39%
Republican	Brian Joseph Murphy	1,773	28.96%
Republican	Mark James Nelson	958	15.65%
Total votes		6,122	100.00%

=== District 25 ===
District 25 election
Nominee	Tom Pischke	Bryan Breitling
Party	Republican	Independent
Senator before election
Tom Pischke
Republican
Elected Senator
TBD

The incumbent senator for District 25 is Republican Tom Pischke, first elected in 2022. He was re-elected in 2024 with 72.7 of the vote at the general election. He is running for re-election.

==== Republican primary ====
===== Nominee =====
- Tom Pischke, incumbent senator

==== Independent candidates ====
===== Declared =====
- Bryan Breitling, former senator from the 23rd district (2021–2025)

=== District 26 ===
District 26 election
Nominee	Rebecca Reimer	Shawn Bordeaux
Party	Republican	Democratic
Senator before election
Tamara Grove
Republican
Elected Senator
TBD

The incumbent senator for District 26 is Republican Tamara Grove, first elected in 2024 with 57.3 of the vote at the general election. She is running for re-election.

==== Republican primary ====
===== Nominee =====
- Rebecca Reimer, state representative from District 26B (2018–present)

===== Eliminated in primary =====
- Tamara Grove, incumbent senator

===== Results =====
District 26 election, Republican primary Unofficial results
Party	Candidate	Votes	%
Republican	Rebecca Reimer	1,210	53.26%
Republican	Tamara Grove (incumbent)	1,062	46.74%
Total votes		2,272	100.00%

==== Democratic primary ====
===== Nominee =====
- Shawn Bordeaux, former senator from this district (2023–2025)

===== Eliminated in primary =====
- Luke Lunderman, candidate for state representative from District 26A in 2018

===== Results =====
District 26 election, Democratic primary Unofficial results
Party	Candidate	Votes	%
Democratic	Shawn Bordeaux	762	60.28%
Democratic	Troy Luke Lunderman	502	39.72%
Total votes		1,264	100.00%

=== District 27 ===
District 27 election
Nominee	Celestine Stadnick	Anthony Kathol
Party	Democratic	Republican
Senator before election
Red Dawn Foster
Democratic
Elected Senator
TBD

The incumbent senator for District 27 is Democrat Red Dawn Foster, first elected in 2018. She was re-elected in 2024 with 52.0 of the vote at the general election. She ineligible for a fifth consecutive term.

==== Democratic primary ====
===== Nominee =====
- Celestine Stadnick, principal of Little Wound School

===== Term-limited =====
- Red Dawn Foster, incumbent senator

==== Republican primary ====
===== Nominee =====
- Anthony Kathol, nominee for this district in 2024

==== Independent candidates ====
===== Nominee =====
- Peri Pourier, state representative from this district (2019–present)

=== District 28 ===
District 28 election
Nominee	J. Sam Marty
Party	Republican
Senator before election
J. Sam Marty
Republican
Elected Senator
TBD

The incumbent senator for District 28 is Republican J. Sam Marty, first elected in 2024 with 64.1 of the vote at the general election. He is running for re-election.

==== Republican primary ====
===== Nominee =====
- J. Sam Marty, incumbent senator

===== Eliminated in primary =====
- Ryan Maher, former senator from this district (2007–2015, 2017–2025)

===== Results =====
District 28 election, Republican primary Unofficial results
Party	Candidate	Votes	%
Republican	J. Sam Marty (incumbent)	2,095	51.79%
Republican	Ryan Maher	1,950	48.21%
Total votes		4,045	100.00%

=== District 29 ===
District 29 election
Nominee	William J. Meirose
Party	Republican
Senator before election
J. Sam Marty
Republican
Elected Senator
TBD

The incumbent senator for District 29 is Republican John Carley, first elected in 2024 unopposed at the general election. He is running for re-election.

==== Republican primary ====
===== Nominee =====
- William J. Meirose, U.S. Army veteran and pastor

===== Eliminated in primary =====
- John Carley, incumbent senator

===== Results =====
District 29 election, Republican primary Unofficial results
Party	Candidate	Votes	%
Republican	William J. Meirose	2,280	51.46%
Republican	John Carley (incumbent)	2,151	48.54%
Total votes		4,431	100.00%

=== District 30 ===
District 30 election
Nominee	Amber Hulse
Party	Republican
Senator before election
Amber Hulse
Republican
Elected Senator
TBD

The incumbent senator for District 30 is Republican Amber Hulse, first elected in with 74.4 of the vote at the general election. She is running for re-election, facing a primary bid from former senator Julie Frye-Mueller, whom she narrowly beat in the 2024 Republican primary with 45.9 percent of the vote.

==== Republican primary ====
===== Nominee =====
- Amber Hulse, incumbent senator

===== Eliminated in primary =====
- Julie Frye-Mueller, former senator from this district (2021–2023, 2023–2025)

===== Results =====
District 30 election, Republican primary Unofficial results
Party	Candidate	Votes	%
Republican	Amber Hulse	4,139	66.51%
Republican	Julie Frye-Mueller	2,084	33.49%
Total votes		6,223	100.00%

=== District 31 ===
District 31 election
Nominee	Randy Deibert
Party	Republican
Senator before election
Randy Deibert
Republican
Elected Senator
TBD

The incumbent senator for District 31 is Republican Randy Deibert, first elected in 2022. He was re-elected in 2024 unopposed at the general election. He is running for re-election.

==== Republican primary ====
===== Nominee =====
- Randy Deibert, incumbent senator

===== Eliminated in primary =====
- John Teupel, former state representative from this district

===== Results =====
District 31 election, Republican primary Unofficial results
Party	Candidate	Votes	%
Republican	Randy Deibert (incumbent)	2,692	56.45%
Republican	John Teupel	2,077	43.55%
Total votes		4,769	100.00%

=== District 32 ===
District 32 election
Nominee	Helene Duhamel	Jeff Shelton
Party	Republican	Democratic
Senator before election
Helene Duhamel
Republican
Elected Senator
TBD

The incumbent senator for District 32 is Republican Helene Duhamel, first appointed in 2019. She was re-elected in 2024 with 60.0 percent of the vote at the general election. She is running for re-election. Should she win another term, she will be ineligible to run in 2028.

==== Republican primary ====
===== Nominee =====
- Helene Duhamel, incumbent senator

===== Eliminated in primary =====
- Karen McNeal, independent candidate for this district in 2024

===== Results =====
District 32 election, Republican primary Unofficial results
Party	Candidate	Votes	%
Republican	Helene Duhamel (incumbent)	1,316	63.42%
Republican	Karen McNeal	759	36.58%
Total votes		2,075	100.00%

==== Democratic primary ====
===== Nominee =====
- Jeff Shelton, archaeologist

=== District 33 ===
District 33 election
Nominee	David Johnson	Christopher Baumgartner
Party	Republican	Democratic
Senator before election
Curt Voight
Republican
Elected Senator
TBD

The incumbent senator for District 33 is Republican Curt Voight, first elected in 2024 unopposed at the general election. He is running for re-election, facing a primary bid from former senator David Johnson, whom he beat in the 2024 Republican primary with 55.8 percent of the vote.

==== Republican primary ====
===== Nominee =====
- David Johnson, former senator from this district (2021–2025)

===== Eliminated in primary =====
- Curt Voight, incumbent senator

===== Results =====
District 33 election, Republican primary Unofficial results
Party	Candidate	Votes	%
Republican	David Johnson	2,409	51.82%
Republican	Curt Voight (incumbent)	2,240	48.18%
Total votes		4,649	100.00%

==== Democratic primary ====
===== Nominee =====
- Christopher Baumgartner

=== District 34 ===
District 34 election
Nominee	Taffy Howard	Michael Calabrese
Party	Republican	Democratic
Senator before election
Taffy Howard
Republican
Elected Senator
TBD

The incumbent senator for District 34 is Republican Taffy Howard, first elected in 2024 with 60.2 percent of the vote at the general election. She is running for re-election.

==== Republican primary ====
===== Nominee =====
- Taffy Howard, incumbent senator

===== Eliminated in primary =====
- Jason E. Green, candidate for this district in 2024

===== Results =====
District 34 election, Republican primary Unofficial results
Party	Candidate	Votes	%
Republican	Taffy Howard (incumbent)	2,334	57.01%
Republican	Jason E. Green	1,760	42.99%
Total votes		4,094	100.00%

==== Democratic primary ====
===== Nominee =====
- Michael Calabrese, nominee for the 32nd district in 2020

=== District 35 ===
District 35 election
Nominee	Greg Blanc
Party	Republican
Senator before election
Greg Blanc
Republican
Elected Senator
TBD

The incumbent senator for District 35 is Republican Greg Blanc, first elected in 2024 unopposed at the general election. He is running for re-election.

==== Republican primary ====
===== Nominee =====
- Greg Blanc, incumbent senator

===== Eliminated in primary =====
- Nicole Mitzel

===== Results =====
District 35 election, Republican primary Unofficial results
Party	Candidate	Votes	%
Republican	Greg Blanc (incumbent)	1,289	52.21%
Republican	Nicole Mitzel	1,180	47.79%
Total votes		2,469	100.00%
