= 2024 South Dakota Senate election =

- November 5, 2024

All 35 seats in the South Dakota Senate 18 seats needed for a majority
	Majority party	Minority party
Leader	Lee Schoenbeck (retired)	Reynold Nesiba (term-limited)
Party	Republican	Democratic
Leader's seat	5th	15th
Last election	31 seats	4 seats
Seats won	32	3
Seat change	▲1	▼1
Popular vote	273,439	69,347
Percentage	78.65%	19.94%
Swing	▼2.97%	▲5.38
- Results: Republican gain Republican hold Democratic hold
Senate President Pro Tempore before election
Lee Schoenbeck
Republican
Elected Senate President Pro Tempore
Chris Karr
Republican

The 2024 South Dakota Senate elections were held on November 5, 2024, to elect all 35 seats in the South Dakota Senate. The elections coincided with the presidential, U.S. House, and State House elections. The primary elections were held on June 4, 2024.

== Retirements ==
=== Democrats ===
1. District 15: Reynold Nesiba was term-limited.

=== Republicans ===
1. District 3: Al Novstrup was term-limited (running for State House).
2. District 4: John Wiik was term-limited.
3. District 5: Lee Schoenbeck retired.
4. District 6: Herman Otten retired to run for State House.
5. District 9: Brent Hoffman retired.
6. District 11: Jim Stalzer was term-limited.
7. District 13: Jack Kolbeck was term-limited.
8. District 16: Jim Bolin was term-limited.
9. District 20: Joshua Klumb was term-limited.
10. District 23: Bryan Breitling retired.
11. District 28: Ryan Maher was term-limited (running for State House).
12. District 29: Dean Wink retired.
13. District 34: Michael Diedrich retired.

== Incumbents defeated ==
=== In primary elections ===
Five incumbent senators, all Republicans, were defeated in the June 4 primary elections.

==== Republicans ====
1. District 18: Jean Hunhoff lost renomination to Lauren Nelson.
2. District 21: Erin Tobin lost renomination to MyKala Voita.
3. District 30: Julie Frye-Mueller lost renomination to Amber Hulse.
4. District 33: David Johnson lost renomination to Curt Voight.
5. District 35: Mike Walsh lost nomination to a full term to Greg Blanc.

=== In general election ===
One incumbent senator, a Democrat, was defeated in the November 5 general election.

1. District 26: Shawn Bordeaux lost reelection to Tamara Grove.

== Predictions ==
Source	Ranking	As of
Sabato's Crystal Ball	Safe R	October 23, 2024

== Results ==
=== Overview ===
Summary of the November 8, 2024 South Dakota Senate election
Party	Candidates	Votes	%	Seats		
Party	Candidates	Votes	%	Before	After	+/–
Republican	34	273,439	78.65	31	32	▲1
Democratic	17	69,347	19.94	4	3	▼1
Independent	2	4,899	1.41	0	0	Steady
Total		347,685	100.00	35	35	Steady
Registered/Turnout						
Source: South Dakota Secretary of State

Popular vote
Republican	78.65%
Democratic	19.94%
Independents	1.41%

Senate seats
Republican	91.43%
Democratic	8.57%

== Detailed results ==
=== District 1 ===
South Dakota's 1st Senate District General Election, 2024
Party	Candidate	Votes	%
Republican	Michael H. Rohl (incumbent)	8,449	100.0
Total votes		8,449	100.0

=== District 2 ===
South Dakota's 2nd Senate District General Election, 2024
Party	Candidate	Votes	%
Republican	Steve Kolbeck (incumbent)	10,337	100.0
Total votes		10,337	100.0

=== District 3 ===
South Dakota's 3rd Senate District General Election, 2024
Party	Candidate	Votes	%
Republican	Carl E. Perry	6,900	100.0
Total votes		6,900	100.0

=== District 4 ===
South Dakota's 4th Senate District General Election, 2024
Party	Candidate	Votes	%
Republican	Stephanie Sauder	10,375	100.0
Total votes		10,375	100.0

=== District 5 ===
South Dakota's 5th Senate District General Election, 2024
Party	Candidate	Votes	%
Republican	Glen A. Vilhauer	7,889	71.1
Democratic	Dennis Solberg	3,203	28.9
Total votes		11,092	100.0

=== District 6 ===
South Dakota's 6th Senate District General Election, 2024
Party	Candidate	Votes	%
Republican	Ernie Otten	8,961	100.0
Total votes		8,961	100.0

=== General election ===
South Dakota's 7th Senate District General Election, 2024
Party	Candidate	Votes	%
Republican	Tim Reed (incumbent)	7,597	100.0
Total votes		7,597	100.0

=== District 8 ===
South Dakota's 8th Senate District General Election, 2024
Party	Candidate	Votes	%
Republican	Casey Crabtree (incumbent)	10,033	100.0
Total votes		10,033	100.0

=== District 9 ===
South Dakota's 9th Senate District General Election, 2024
Party	Candidate	Votes	%
Republican	Joy Hohn	8,137	100.0
Total votes		8,137	100.0

=== General election ===
South Dakota's 10th Senate District General Election, 2024
Party	Candidate	Votes	%
Democratic	Liz Larson (incumbent)	5,606	100.0
Total votes		5,606	100.0

=== District 11 ===
South Dakota's 11th Senate District General Election, 2024
Party	Candidate	Votes	%
Republican	Chris Karr	6,796	58.9
Democratic	Steve Natz	4,747	41.1
Total votes		11,543	100.0

=== District 12 ===
South Dakota's 12th Senate District General Election, 2024
Party	Candidate	Votes	%
Republican	Arch Beal (incumbent)	6,167	55.7
Democratic	Clay Hoffman	4,908	44.3
Total votes		11,075	100.0

=== General election ===
South Dakota's 13th Senate District General Election, 2024
Party	Candidate	Votes	%
Republican	Sue Peterson	8,384	58.5
Democratic	Ali Rae Horsted	5,948	41.5
Total votes		14,332	100.0

=== District 14 ===
South Dakota's 14th Senate District General Election, 2024
Party	Candidate	Votes	%
Republican	Larry Zikmund (incumbent)	7,127	54.6
Democratic	Sandra Henry	5,936	45.4
Total votes		13,063	100.0

=== District 15 ===
South Dakota's 15th Senate District General Election, 2024
Party	Candidate	Votes	%
Democratic	Jamie Smith	5,052	52.4
Republican	Brenda Lawrence	4,582	47.6
Total votes		9,634	100.0

=== District 16 ===
South Dakota's 16th Senate District General Election, 2024
Party	Candidate	Votes	%
Republican	Kevin D. Jensen	9,368	100.0
Total votes		9,368	100.0

=== District 17 ===
South Dakota's 17th Senate District General Election, 2024
Party	Candidate	Votes	%
Republican	Sydney Davis (incumbent)	7,796	100.0
Total votes		7,796	100.0

=== District 18 ===
South Dakota's 18th Senate District General Election, 2024
Party	Candidate	Votes	%
Republican	Lauren Nelson	6,189	57.2
Democratic	Sarah Carda	4,629	42.8
Total votes		10,818	100.0

=== District 19 ===
South Dakota's 19th Senate District General Election, 2024
Party	Candidate	Votes	%
Republican	Kyle Schoenfish (incumbent)	8,738	77.2
Democratic	Michael J. Miller	2,583	22.8
Total votes		11,321	100.0

=== District 20 ===
South Dakota's 20th Senate District General Election, 2024
Party	Candidate	Votes	%
Republican	Paul Miskimins	8,184	100.0
Total votes		8,184	100.0

=== District 21 ===
South Dakota's 21st Senate District General Election, 2024
Party	Candidate	Votes	%
Republican	Mykala Voita	8,452	77.1
Democratic	Dan Andersson	2,518	22.9
Total votes		10,970	100.0

=== District 22 ===
South Dakota's 22nd Senate District General Election, 2024
Party	Candidate	Votes	%
Republican	David Wheeler (incumbent)	7,271	73.2
Democratic	Jim A. Schmidt	2,666	26.8
Total votes		9,937	100.0

=== District 23 ===
South Dakota's 23rd Senate District General Election, 2024
Party	Candidate	Votes	%
Republican	Mark Lapka	9,183	100.0
Total votes		9,183	100.0

=== District 24 ===
South Dakota's 24th Senate District General Election, 2024
Party	Candidate	Votes	%
Republican	Jim Mehlhaff (incumbent)	9,555	100.0
Total votes		9,555	100.0

=== District 25 ===
South Dakota's 25th Senate District General Election, 2024
Party	Candidate	Votes	%
Republican	Tom Pischke (incumbent)	9,667	72.7
Democratic	Brian Wirth	3,634	27.3
Total votes		13,301	100.0

=== District 26 ===
South Dakota's 26th Senate District General Election, 2024
Party	Candidate	Votes	%
Republican	Tamara Grove	4,328	57.3
Democratic	Shawn Bordeaux (incumbent)	3,221	42.7
Total votes		7,549	100.0

=== District 27 ===
South Dakota's 27th Senate District General Election, 2024
Party	Candidate	Votes	%
Democratic	Red Dawn Foster (incumbent)	3,807	52.0
Republican	Anthony G. Kathol	3,518	48.0
Total votes		7,325	100.0

=== District 28 ===
South Dakota's 28th Senate District General Election, 2024
Party	Candidate	Votes	%
Republican	Sam Marty	6,969	64.1
Democratic	Dean Schrempp	2,475	22.7
Independent	Shane C. Farlee	1,436	13.2
Total votes		10,880	100.0

=== District 29 ===
South Dakota's 29th Senate District General Election, 2024
Party	Candidate	Votes	%
Republican	John Carley	8,634	100.0
Total votes		8,634	100.0

=== District 30 ===
South Dakota's 30th Senate District General Election, 2024
Party	Candidate	Votes	%
Republican	Amber Hulse	11,216	74.4
Democratic	Bret Swanson	3,868	25.6
Total votes		15,084	100.0

=== District 31 ===
South Dakota's 31st Senate District General Election, 2024
Party	Candidate	Votes	%
Republican	Randy Deibert (incumbent)	10,294	100.0
Total votes		10,294	100.0

=== District 32 ===
South Dakota's 32nd Senate District General Election, 2024
Party	Candidate	Votes	%
Republican	Helene Duhamel (incumbent)	5,189	60.0
Independent	Karen M. McNeal	3,463	40.0
Total votes		8,652	100.0

=== District 33 ===
South Dakota's 33rd Senate District General Election, 2024
Party	Candidate	Votes	%
Republican	Curt Voight	9,247	100.0
Total votes		9,247	100.0

=== District 34 ===
South Dakota's 34th Senate District General Election, 2024
Party	Candidate	Votes	%
Republican	Taffy Howard	7,586	60.2
Democratic	Kehala Two Bulls	5,016	39.8
Total votes		12,602	100.0

=== District 35 ===
South Dakota's 35th Senate District General Election, 2024
Party	Candidate	Votes	%
Republican	Greg Blanc	9,851	100.0
Total votes		9,851	100.0

== See also ==
- List of South Dakota state legislatures
