= 2022 South Dakota Senate election =

- November 8, 2022

All 35 seats in the South Dakota Senate 18 seats needed for a majority
	Majority party	Minority party
Leader	Lee Schoenbeck	Troy Heinert (retired)
Party	Republican	Democratic
Leader's seat	5th	26th
Seats before	32	3
Seats after	31	4
Seat change	▼1	▲1
Popular vote	229,609	40,958
Percentage	81.62%	14.56%
Swing	▲8.79%	▼6.43%
- Results: Democratic gain Democratic hold Republican hold
Senate President Pro Tempore before election
Lee Schoenbeck
Republican
Elected Senate President Pro Tempore
Lee Schoenbeck
Republican

The 2022 South Dakota Senate elections were held on November 8, 2022, as part of the biennial 2022 United States elections. All 35 seats in the South Dakota Senate were up for election. Primary elections were held on June 7, 2022. The elections coincided with elections for other offices in South Dakota, including the US Senate, US House, South Dakota Governor, South Dakota Secretary of State, South Dakota Attorney General, and the South Dakota House.

Following the 2022 elections, Republicans maintained their supermajority by losing only one seat, giving them a 31-to-4 member advantage over Democrats.

== Retirements ==
=== Democrats ===
1. District 26: Troy Heinert retired due to term limits.

=== Republicans ===
1. District 2: Brock Greenfield retired due to term limits.
2. District 7: V. J. Smith retired.
3. District 9: Wayne Steinhauer retired.
4. District 12: Blake Curd retired due to term limits.
5. District 17: Arthur Rusch retired due to term limits.
6. District 25: Marsha Symens retired.
7. District 29: Gary Cammack retired due to term limits.
8. District 31: Timothy Johns retired.

== Predictions ==
Source	Ranking	As of
Sabato's Crystal Ball	Safe R	May 19, 2022

== Results ==
=== Overview ===
Summary of the November 8, 2022 South Dakota Senate election
Party	Candidates	Votes	%	Seats		
Party	Candidates	Votes	%	Before	After	+/–
Republican	35	229,609	81.62	32	31	▼1
Democratic	12	40,958	14.56	3	4	▲1
Independent	3	8,219	2.92	0	0	Steady
Libertarian	1	2,537	0.90	0	0	Steady
Total		281,323	100.00	35	35	Steady
Registered/Turnout		597,073	59.40			
Source: South Dakota Secretary of State

Popular vote
Republican	81.62%
Democratic	14.56%
Independents	2.92%
Libertarian	0.90%

Senate seats
Republican	88.57%
Democratic	11.43%

== Defeated incumbents ==
=== Primary election ===
1. District 24: Republican Mary Duvall lost renomination to Jim Mehlhaff.

=== General election ===
1. District 10: Republican Margaret Sutton was defeated in the general election by Democrat Liz Larson.

== Summary of results by State Senate district ==
State Senate district	Incumbent	Party	Elected Senator	Party
1	Michael H. Rohl	Rep	Michael H. Rohl	Rep
2	Brock Greenfield	Rep	Steve Kolbeck	Rep
3	Al Novstrup	Rep	Al Novstrup	Rep
4	John Wiik	Rep	John Wiik	Rep
5	Lee Schoenbeck	Rep	Lee Schoenbeck	Rep
6	Herman Otten	Rep	Herman Otten	Rep
7	V. J. Smith	Rep	Tim Reed	Rep
8	Casey Crabtree	Rep	Casey Crabtree	Rep
9	Wayne Steinhauer	Rep	Brent Hoffman	Rep
10	Margaret Sutton	Rep	Elizabeth Larson	Dem
11	Jim Stalzer	Rep	Jim Stalzer	Rep
12	Blake Curd	Rep	Arch Beal	Rep
13	Jack Kolbeck	Rep	Jack Kolbeck	Rep
14	Larry Zikmund	Rep	Larry Zikmund	Rep
15	Reynold Nesiba	Dem	Reynold Nesiba	Dem
16	Jim Bolin	Rep	Jim Bolin	Rep
17	Arthur Rusch	Rep	Sydney Davis	Rep
18	Jean Hunhoff	Rep	Jean Hunhoff	Rep
19	Kyle Schoenfish	Rep	Kyle Schoenfish	Rep
20	Joshua Klumb	Rep	Joshua Klumb	Rep
21	Erin Tobin	Rep	Erin Tobin	Rep
22	David Wheeler	Rep	David Wheeler	Rep
23	Bryan Breitling	Rep	Bryan Breitling	Rep
24	Mary Duvall	Rep	Jim Mehlhaff	Rep
25	Marsha Symens	Rep	Tom Pischke	Rep
26	Troy Heinert	Dem	Shawn Bordeaux	Dem
27	Red Dawn Foster	Dem	Red Dawn Foster	Dem
28	Ryan Maher	Rep	Ryan Maher	Rep
29	Gary Cammack	Rep	Dean Wink	Rep
30	Julie Frye-Mueller	Rep	Julie Frye-Mueller	Rep
31	Timothy Johns	Rep	Randy Deibert	Rep
32	Helene Duhamel	Rep	Helene Duhamel	Rep
33	David Johnson	Rep	David Johnson	Rep
34	Michael Diedrich	Rep	Michael Diedrich	Rep
35	Jessica Castleberry	Rep	Jessica Castleberry	Rep

Primary election results source:

General election results source:

== Detailed results ==
Primary election results source:

General election results source:

- Note: If a primary election is not listed, then there was not a competitive primary in that district (i.e., every candidate who ran in the primary advanced to the general election).

=== District 1 ===
Republican primary

South Dakota's 1st Senate District Republican primary election, 2022
Party	Candidate	Votes	%
Republican	Michael H. Rohl (incumbent)	1,901	70.51%
Republican	Joe Donnell	795	29.49%
Total votes		2,696	100.00%

General election

South Dakota's 1st Senate District general election, 2022
Party	Candidate	Votes	%
Republican	Michael H. Rohl (incumbent)	6,098	58.90%
Independent	Susan Wismer	4,256	41.10%
Total votes		10,354	100.00%
Republican hold			

=== District 2 ===
Republican primary

South Dakota's 2nd Senate District Republican primary election, 2022
Party	Candidate	Votes	%
Republican	Steve Kolbeck	1,747	66.22%
Republican	Spencer Wrightsman	891	33.78%
Total votes		2,638	100.00%

General election

South Dakota's 2nd Senate District general election, 2022
Party	Candidate	Votes	%
Republican	Steve Kolbeck	7,810	100.00%
Total votes		7,810	100.00%
Republican hold			

=== District 3 ===
Republican primary

South Dakota's 3rd Senate District Republican primary election, 2022
Party	Candidate	Votes	%
Republican	Al Novstrup (incumbent)	1,794	59.48%
Republican	Rachel Dix	1,222	40.52%
Total votes		3,016	100.00%

General election

South Dakota's 3rd Senate District general election, 2022
Party	Candidate	Votes	%
Republican	Al Novstrup (incumbent)	5,698	100.00%
Total votes		5,698	100.00%
Republican hold			

=== District 4 ===
General election

South Dakota's 4th Senate District general election, 2022
Party	Candidate	Votes	%
Republican	John Wiik (incumbent)	8,917	100.00%
Total votes		8,917	100.00%
Republican hold			

=== District 5 ===
Republican primary

South Dakota's 5th Senate District Republican primary election, 2022
Party	Candidate	Votes	%
Republican	Lee Schoenbeck (incumbent)	1,808	58.74%
Republican	Colin Alan Paulsen	1,270	41.26%
Total votes		3,078	100.00%

General election

South Dakota's 5th Senate District general election, 2022
Party	Candidate	Votes	%
Republican	Lee Schoenbeck (incumbent)	6,743	100.00%
Total votes		6,743	100.00%
Republican hold			

=== District 6 ===
General election

South Dakota's 6th Senate District general election, 2022
Party	Candidate	Votes	%
Republican	Herman Otten (incumbent)	6,513	100.00%
Total votes		6,513	100.00%
Republican hold			

=== District 7 ===
Republican primary

South Dakota's 7th Senate District Republican primary election, 2022
Party	Candidate	Votes	%
Republican	Tim Reed	1,446	60.17%
Republican	Julie Erickson	957	39.83%
Total votes		2,403	100.00%

General election

South Dakota's 7th Senate District general election, 2022
Party	Candidate	Votes	%
Republican	Tim Reed	6,263	100.00%
Total votes		6,263	100.00%
Republican hold			

=== District 8 ===
Republican primary

South Dakota's 8th Senate District Republican primary election, 2022
Party	Candidate	Votes	%
Republican	Casey Crabtree (incumbent)	3,124	78.97%
Republican	Heather DeVries	832	21.03%
Total votes		3,956	100.00%

General election

South Dakota's 8th Senate District general election, 2022
Party	Candidate	Votes	%
Republican	Casey Crabtree (incumbent)	8,926	100.00%
Total votes		8,926	100.00%
Republican hold			

=== District 9 ===
Republican primary

South Dakota's 9th Senate District Republican primary election, 2022
Party	Candidate	Votes	%
Republican	Brent Hoffman	1,351	66.78%
Republican	Mark Willadsen	672	33.22%
Total votes		2,023	100.00%

General election

South Dakota's 9th Senate District general election, 2022
Party	Candidate	Votes	%
Republican	Brent Hoffman	6,024	100.00%
Total votes		6,024	100.00%
Republican hold			

=== District 10 ===
General election

South Dakota's 10th Senate District general election, 2022
Party	Candidate	Votes	%
Democratic	Liz Larson	4,488	56.69%
Republican	Maggie Sutton (incumbent)	3,429	43.31%
Total votes		7,917	100.00%
Democratic gain from Republican			

=== District 11 ===
General election

South Dakota's 11th Senate District general election, 2022
Party	Candidate	Votes	%
Republican	Jim Stalzer (incumbent)	5,289	55.24%
Democratic	Sheryl L. Johnson	4,286	44.76%
Total votes		9,575	100.00%
Republican hold			

=== District 12 ===
General election

South Dakota's 12th Senate District general election, 2022
Party	Candidate	Votes	%
Republican	Arch Beal	4,950	53.88%
Democratic	Jessica Meyers	4,237	46.12%
Total votes		9,187	100.00%
Republican hold			

=== District 13 ===
General election

South Dakota's 13th Senate District general election, 2022
Party	Candidate	Votes	%
Republican	Jack Kolbeck (incumbent)	7,345	70.21%
Independent	Lora Hubbel	3,116	29.79%
Total votes		10,461	100.00%
Republican hold			

=== District 14 ===
General election

South Dakota's 14th Senate District general election, 2022
Party	Candidate	Votes	%
Republican	Larry P. Zikmund (incumbent)	5,854	53.93%
Democratic	Matthew Tysdal	5,001	46.07%
Total votes		10,855	100.00%
Republican hold			

=== District 15 ===
General election

South Dakota's 15th Senate District general election, 2022
Party	Candidate	Votes	%
Democratic	Reynold F. Nesiba (incumbent)	3,697	52.76%
Republican	Brenda Lawrence	3,310	47.24%
Total votes		7,007	100.00%
Democratic hold			

=== District 16 ===
Republican primary

South Dakota's 16th Senate District Republican primary election, 2022
Party	Candidate	Votes	%
Republican	Jim Bolin (incumbent)	1,731	51.73%
Republican	Nancy Rasmussen	1,615	48.27%
Total votes		3,346	100.00%

General election

South Dakota's 16th Senate District general election, 2022
Party	Candidate	Votes	%
Republican	Jim Bolin (incumbent)	6,770	66.20%
Democratic	Donn Larson	2,610	25.52%
Independent	Brian J. Burge	847	8.28%
Total votes		10,227	100.00%
Republican hold			

=== District 17 ===
General election

South Dakota's 17th Senate District general election, 2022
Party	Candidate	Votes	%
Republican	Sydney Davis	5,997	100.00%
Total votes		5,997	100.00%
Republican hold			

=== District 18 ===
General election

South Dakota's 18th Senate District general election, 2022
Party	Candidate	Votes	%
Republican	Jean M. Hunhoff (incumbent)	5,748	65.03%
Democratic	Fredrick Bender	3,091	34.97%
Total votes		8,839	100.00%
Republican hold			

=== District 19 ===
General election

South Dakota's 19th Senate District general election, 2022
Party	Candidate	Votes	%
Republican	Kyle Schoenfish (incumbent)	7,906	81.52%
Democratic	Russell Graeff	1,792	18.48%
Total votes		9,698	100.00%
Republican hold			

=== District 20 ===
General election

South Dakota's 20th Senate District general election, 2022
Party	Candidate	Votes	%
Republican	Joshua Klumb (incumbent)	6,968	100.00%
Total votes		6,968	100.00%
Republican hold			

=== District 21 ===
General election

South Dakota's 21st Senate District general election, 2022
Party	Candidate	Votes	%
Republican	Erin Tobin (incumbent)	7,976	81.83%
Democratic	Dan Andersson	1,771	18.17%
Total votes		9,747	100.00%
Republican hold			

=== District 22 ===
General election

South Dakota's 22nd Senate District general election, 2022
Party	Candidate	Votes	%
Republican	David Wheeler (incumbent)	6,581	100.00%
Total votes		6,581	100.00%
Republican hold			

=== District 23 ===
Republican primary

South Dakota's 23rd Senate District Republican primary election, 2022
Party	Candidate	Votes	%
Republican	Bryan J. Breitling (incumbent)	3,019	54.19%
Republican	Spencer Gosch	2,552	45.81%
Total votes		5,571	100.00%

General election

South Dakota's 23rd Senate District general election, 2022
Party	Candidate	Votes	%
Republican	Bryan J. Breitling (incumbent)	7,954	100.00%
Total votes		7,954	100.00%
Republican hold			

=== District 24 ===
Republican primary

South Dakota's 24th Senate District Republican primary election, 2022
Party	Candidate	Votes	%
Republican	Jim Mehlhaff	3,157	51.25%
Republican	Mary Duvall (incumbent)	3,003	48.75%
Total votes		6,160	100.00%

General election

South Dakota's 24th Senate District general election, 2022
Party	Candidate	Votes	%
Republican	Jim Mehlhaff	8,246	100.00%
Total votes		8,246	100.00%
Republican hold			

=== District 25 ===
Republican primary

South Dakota's 25th Senate District Republican primary election, 2022
Party	Candidate	Votes	%
Republican	Tom Pischke	1,396	45.06%
Republican	Leslie "Doc" Heinemann	672	21.69%
Republican	Lisa Rave	591	19.08%
Republican	Kevin R. Crisp	439	14.17%
Total votes		3,098	100.00%

General election

South Dakota's 25th Senate District general election, 2022
Party	Candidate	Votes	%
Republican	Tom Pischke	7,868	100.00%
Total votes		7,868	100.00%
Republican hold			

=== District 26 ===
General election

South Dakota's 26th Senate District general election, 2022
Party	Candidate	Votes	%
Democratic	Shawn Bordeaux	3,483	58.26%
Republican	Joel Koskan	2,495	41.74%
Total votes		5,978	100.00%
Democratic hold			

=== District 27 ===
General election

South Dakota's 27th Senate District general election, 2022
Party	Candidate	Votes	%
Democratic	Red Dawn Foster (incumbent)	3,179	51.45%
Republican	David Jones	3,000	48.55%
Total votes		6,179	100.00%
Democratic hold			

=== District 28 ===
General election

South Dakota's 28th Senate District general election, 2022
Party	Candidate	Votes	%
Republican	Ryan M. Maher (incumbent)	7,094	100.00%
Total votes		7,094	100.00%
Republican hold			

=== District 29 ===
Republican primary

South Dakota's 29th Senate District Republican primary election, 2022
Party	Candidate	Votes	%
Republican	Dean Wink	2,112	50.66%
Republican	John Carley	1,552	37.23%
Republican	Beka Zerbst	505	12.11%
Total votes		4,169	100.00%

General election

South Dakota's 29th Senate District general election, 2022
Party	Candidate	Votes	%
Republican	Dean Wink	7,272	100.00%
Total votes		7,272	100.00%
Republican hold			

=== District 30 ===
Republican primary

South Dakota's 30th Senate District Republican primary election, 2022
Party	Candidate	Votes	%
Republican	Julie Frye-Mueller (incumbent)	2,849	50.41%
Republican	Timothy R. Goodwin	2,803	49.59%
Total votes		5,652	100.00%

General election

South Dakota's 30th Senate District general election, 2022
Party	Candidate	Votes	%
Republican	Julie Frye-Mueller (incumbent)	9,598	100.00%
Total votes		9,598	100.00%
Republican hold			

=== District 31 ===
Republican primary

South Dakota's 31st Senate District Republican primary election, 2022
Party	Candidate	Votes	%
Republican	Randy Deibert	2,518	62.11%
Republican	Ron Moeller	1,536	37.89%
Total votes		4,054	100.00%

General election

South Dakota's 31st Senate District general election, 2022
Party	Candidate	Votes	%
Republican	Randy Deibert	8,536	100.00%
Total votes		8,536	100.00%
Republican hold			

=== District 32 ===
General election

South Dakota's 32nd Senate District general election, 2022
Party	Candidate	Votes	%
Republican	Helene Duhamel (incumbent)	4,257	56.16%
Democratic	Nicole A. Heenan	3,323	43.84%
Total votes		7,580	100.00%
Republican hold			

=== District 33 ===
Republican primary

South Dakota's 33rd Senate District Republican primary election, 2022
Party	Candidate	Votes	%
Republican	David Johnson (incumbent)	2,707	56.82%
Republican	Janet Jensen	2,057	43.18%
Total votes		4,764	100.00%

General election

South Dakota's 33rd Senate District general election, 2022
Party	Candidate	Votes	%
Republican	David Johnson (incumbent)	7,885	75.66%
Libertarian	Darren Freidel	2,537	24.34%
Total votes		10,422	100.00%
Republican hold			

=== District 34 ===
General election

South Dakota's 34th Senate District general election, 2022
Party	Candidate	Votes	%
Republican	Michael Diedrich (incumbent)	7,505	100.00%
Total votes		7,505	100.00%
Republican hold			

=== District 35 ===
General election

South Dakota's 35th Senate District general election, 2022
Party	Candidate	Votes	%
Republican	Jessica Castleberry (incumbent)	6,784	100.00%
Total votes		6,784	100.00%
Republican hold			

== Results ==
=== Close races ===
Districts where the margin of victory was under 10%:

1. District 27, 2.9%
2. District 15, 5.52%
3. District 26, 5.68%
4. District 12, 7.76%
5. District 14, 7.86%

Red denotes races won by Republicans. Blue denotes races won by Democrats.
