= South Dakota's 22nd legislative district =

American legislative district

South Dakota's 22nd State Senate district

South Dakota's 22nd legislative district is one of 35 districts in the South Dakota Legislature. Each district is represented by 1 senator and 2 representatives. In the Senate, it has been represented by Republican Brandon Wipf since 2025. Before then it was represented by David Wheeler since 2021. In the House, it has been represented by Republicans Roger D. Chase since 2017 and Lynn Schneider since 2020.

== Geography ==
The district contains Beadle, Clark, and Spink counties in southern South Dakota. Its largest city is Huron.
