= South Dakota's 31st legislative district =

American legislative district

South Dakota's 31st State Senate district

South Dakota's 31st legislative district is one of 35 districts in the South Dakota Legislature. Each district elects one senator and two representatives. In the state senate, it has been represented by Republican Randy Deibert since 2023. In the state house, it has been represented by Republicans Mary Fitzgerald and Scott Odenbach since 2021.

== Geography ==
Located in western South Dakota, the district matches the borders of Lawrence County. Its largest city is Spearfish.
