= R. Shawn Tornow =

American politician

Member of the South Dakota House of Representatives from the 14th district
- In office January 11, 2011 – January 8, 2013
- Preceded by: Joni Cutler
- Succeeded by: Anne Hajek; Larry Zikmund
- In office January 11, 2005 – January 9, 2007
- Preceded by: Bill Peterson
- Succeeded by: Marc Feinstein

Personal details
- Born: August 20, 1962 (age 63)
- Party: Republican

R. Shawn Tornow (born August 20, 1962) is an American politician who served in the South Dakota House of Representatives from the 14th district from 2005 to 2007 and from 2011 to 2013.
