= Alan Solano =

American politician

Member of the South Dakota Senate from the 32nd district
- In office January 13, 2014 – November 30, 2019
- Preceded by: Stan Adelstein
- Succeeded by: Helene Duhamel

Personal details
- Born: May 26, 1966 (age 60) Rapid City, South Dakota
- Party: Republican

Alan Solano (born May 26, 1966) is an American politician who served in the South Dakota Senate from the 32nd district from 2014 to 2019.
