= Anne Hajek =

American politician

Member of the South Dakota House of Representatives from the 14th district
- Incumbent
- Assumed office January 11, 2013

Personal details
- Party: Republican
- Education: South Dakota State University; University of South Dakota School of Law

Anne C. Hajek is an American politician and a Republican member of the South Dakota House of Representatives who has represented District 14 since January 11, 2013.

== Education ==
Hajek earned her BS and MEd from South Dakota State University and her JD from the University of South Dakota School of Law.

== Elections ==
To challenge District 14 incumbent Democratic Representative Marc Feinstein and Republican Representative R. Shawn Tornow, Hajek ran in the three-way June 5, 2012 Republican Primary. Hajek placed first with 946 votes (37.0%) and incumbent Representative Turnow placed third. In the four-way November 6, 2012 General election Hajek took the first seat with 5,792 votes (28.57%) and incumbent Democratic Representative Feinstein took the second seat ahead of Republican nominee Larry Zikmund and fellow Democratic nominee Jeff Winters, who had run for the seat in 2010.

In 2002 Hajek was elected to the Minnehaha County Commission. She was re-elected in 2006, and served until 2010. Hajek was elected to the Sioux Falls City Council at large seat in 1994 and re-elected in 1996.
