= Jordan Youngberg =

American politician and businessman

Member of the South Dakota Senate from the 8th district
- In office January 10, 2017 – June 18, 2020
- Preceded by: Scott Parsley
- Succeeded by: Casey Crabtree

Personal details
- Born: 1990 or 1991 (age 35–36) Dell Rapids, South Dakota, U.S.
- Party: Republican
- Education: Dakota State University

Jordan Youngberg (born 1990/1991) is an American politician and businessman who represented District 8 in the South Dakota Senate from 2017 to 2020. In June 2020, Youngberg resigned from the Senate to work for the South Dakota State Treasurer.

== Early life and education ==
Youngberg was born in Dell Rapids, South Dakota and attended Dakota State University.

== Career ==
Jordan Youngberg, a Republican, ran against Democratic incumbent State Senate member Scott Parsley, defeating him in the general election by a vote of 5869 to 5775. He served in the Senate until his resignation in 2020 to work for the South Dakota State Treasurer. Youngberg was succeeded by Casey Crabtree.
