= Tim Begalka =

American politician

Tim Begalka (Timmy)

Member of the South Dakota Senate from the 4th district
- Incumbent
- Assumed office January 11, 2011
- Preceded by: James R. Peterson

Member of the South Dakota House of Representatives from the 4th district
- In office January 2001 – January 2005 Serving with James R. Peterson (2001–2005)

Personal details
- Born: February 19, 1960 (age 66) Clear Lake, South Dakota
- Party: Republican
- Education: South Dakota State University

Timothy 'Tim' P. Begalka (born February 19, 1960, in Clear Lake, South Dakota) is an American politician and a Republican member of the South Dakota Senate representing District 4 since January 11, 2011. Begalka served non-consecutively in the South Dakota Legislature from January 2001 until January 2005 in the South Dakota House of Representatives District 4 seat.

== Education ==
Begalka earned his BS degree from South Dakota State University.

== Elections ==
- 2012 Begalka was challenged in the June 5, 2012, Republican Primary by Representative Speaker of the House Valentine Rausch, but won with 1,106 votes (66.83%). Begalka won the November 6, 2012, General election with 6,603 votes (60.97%) against Democratic Representative Steve Street.
- 2000 When House District 4 incumbent Republican Representatives Larry Diedrich and Robert Weber both ran for South Dakota Senate, Begalka ran in the three-way 2000 Republican Primary and placed second with 971 votes (32.39%) ahead of third by 8 votes; in the four-way November 7, 2000, General election Democratic nominee James R. Peterson took the first seat and Begalka took the second seat with 4,322 votes (26.72%) ahead of fellow Republican nominee Valentine Rausch and Democratic nominee Ron Foster;
- 2002 Begalka and Craig Haugaard, who had placed third in the 2000 Republican Primary, were unopposed for the June 4, 2002, Republican Primary; in the five-way November 5, 2002, General election Begalka took the first seat with 5,651 votes (32.69%) and incumbent Democratic Representative Peterson took the second seat ahead of Republican nominee Haugaard, Democratic nominee Dawn Jaeger, and Independent candidate Larry Rudebusch.
- 2010 When Senate District 4 incumbent Democratic Senator Peterson left the Legislature and left the seat open, Begalka won the June 8, 2010, Republican Primary with 1,387 votes (61.78%) and won the November 2, 2010, General election with 5,346 votes (61%) against Democratic nominee Dick Schwandt.
