= South Dakota's 2nd legislative district =

American legislative district

South Dakota's 2nd State Senate district

South Dakota's 2nd legislative district is one of 35 districts in the South Dakota Legislature. Each district is represented by 1 senator and 2 representatives. In the Senate, it has been represented by Republican Steve Kolbeck since 2023, and in the House, it has been represented by Republicans David Kull and John Sjaarda since 2023.

== Geography ==
The district is located in southeastern South Dakota. Previously in the northeast, it was moved east of Sioux Falls after 2020 redistricting.

== Recent election results ==
South Dakota legislators are elected to two-year terms, with each permitted to serve a maximum of four consecutive two-year terms. Elections are held every even-numbered year.

=== State senate elections ===
Year	Incumbent	Party	First elected	Result	General election	Primary elections
2022	Brock Greenfield	Republican	2014	Incumbent re-districted. Republican hold.	▌ ✓ Steve Kolbeck (Republican) 100%	Republican: ▌ ✓ Steve Kolbeck 66.2%; ▌ Spencer Wrightsman 33.8%
2020	Brock Greenfield	Republican	2014	Incumbent re-elected.	▌ ✓ Brock Greenfield (Republican) 100%	
2018	Brock Greenfield	Republican	2014	Incumbent re-elected.	▌ ✓ Brock Greenfield (Republican) 67.2%; ▌ Paul Register (Democratic) 32.8%	
2016	Brock Greenfield	Republican	2014	Incumbent re-elected.	▌ ✓ Brock Greenfield (Republican) 100%	
2014	Chuck Welke	Democratic	2012	Incumbent defeated. Republican gain.	▌ ✓ Brock Greenfield (Republican) 52.6%; ▌ Chuck Welke (Democratic) 47.4%	
2012	Art Fryslie	Republican	2008	Incumbent defeated. Democratic gain.	▌ ✓ Chuck Welke (Democratic) 51.4%; ▌ Art Fryslie (Republican) 48.6%	Republican: ▌ ✓ Art Fryslie (inc.) 52.6%; ▌ Norbert Barrie 47.4%
