= Curt Voight =

American politician

Member of the South Dakota Senate from the 33rd district
- Incumbent
- Assumed office January 14, 2025
- Preceded by: David Johnson

Personal details
- Born: February 15, 1946 (age 80)
- Party: Republican
- Website: votevoight.com

Curt Voight (born February 15, 1946) is an American politician. He serves as a Republican member for the 33rd district in the South Dakota State Senate since 2025. His district includes the western edge of Rapid City and extends into the area of the Pactola Lake. Voight is a retired educator and U.S. Army infantry sergeant.
