= South Dakota's 30th legislative district =

American legislative district

South Dakota's 30th State Senate district

South Dakota's 30th legislative district is one of 35 districts in the South Dakota Legislature. Each district elects one senator and two representatives. In the state senate, it has been represented by Republican Amber Hulse since 2025. In the state house, it has been represented by Republicans Dennis Krull since 2023 and Trish Ladner since 2021.

== Geography ==
Located in southwestern South Dakota, the district contains Custer, Fall River, and Pennington counties, south of Rapid City. Its largest city is Hot Springs.
