= South Dakota's 33rd legislative district =

American legislative district

South Dakota's 33rd State Senate district

South Dakota's 33rd legislative district is one of 35 districts in the South Dakota Legislature. Each district elects one senator and two representatives. In the state senate, it has been represented by Republican David Johnson since 2021. In the state house, it has been represented by Republicans Phil Jensen since 2021 and Curt Massie since 2023.

== Geography ==
Located in western South Dakota, the district resides within Meade and Pennington counties in Rapid City.
