= South Dakota's 24th legislative district =

American legislative district

South Dakota's 24th State Senate district

South Dakota's 24th legislative district is one of 35 districts in the South Dakota Legislature. Each district is represented by 1 senator and 2 representatives. In the Senate, it has been represented by Republican Jim Mehlhaff since 2023. In the House, it has been represented by Republicans Will Mortenson and Mike Weisgram since 2021.

== Geography ==
The district contains Haakon, Hughes, Hyde, Stanley, and Sully counties in central South Dakota. Within it is the state's capital city, Pierre.
