= Sue Peterson =

American politician

Member of the South Dakota Senate from the 13th district
- Incumbent
- Assumed office January 14, 2025
- Preceded by: Jack Kolbeck

Member of the South Dakota House of Representatives from the 13th district
- In office January 10, 2017 – January 14, 2025
- Succeeded by: John Hughes

Personal details
- Party: Republican

Sue Peterson is an American politician who sits in the South Dakota Senate, representing the 13th district. A member of the South Dakota Republican Party, she previously represented the same district in the South Dakota House of Representatives. She is a former banker and track coach.
