= John Sjaarda =

American politician

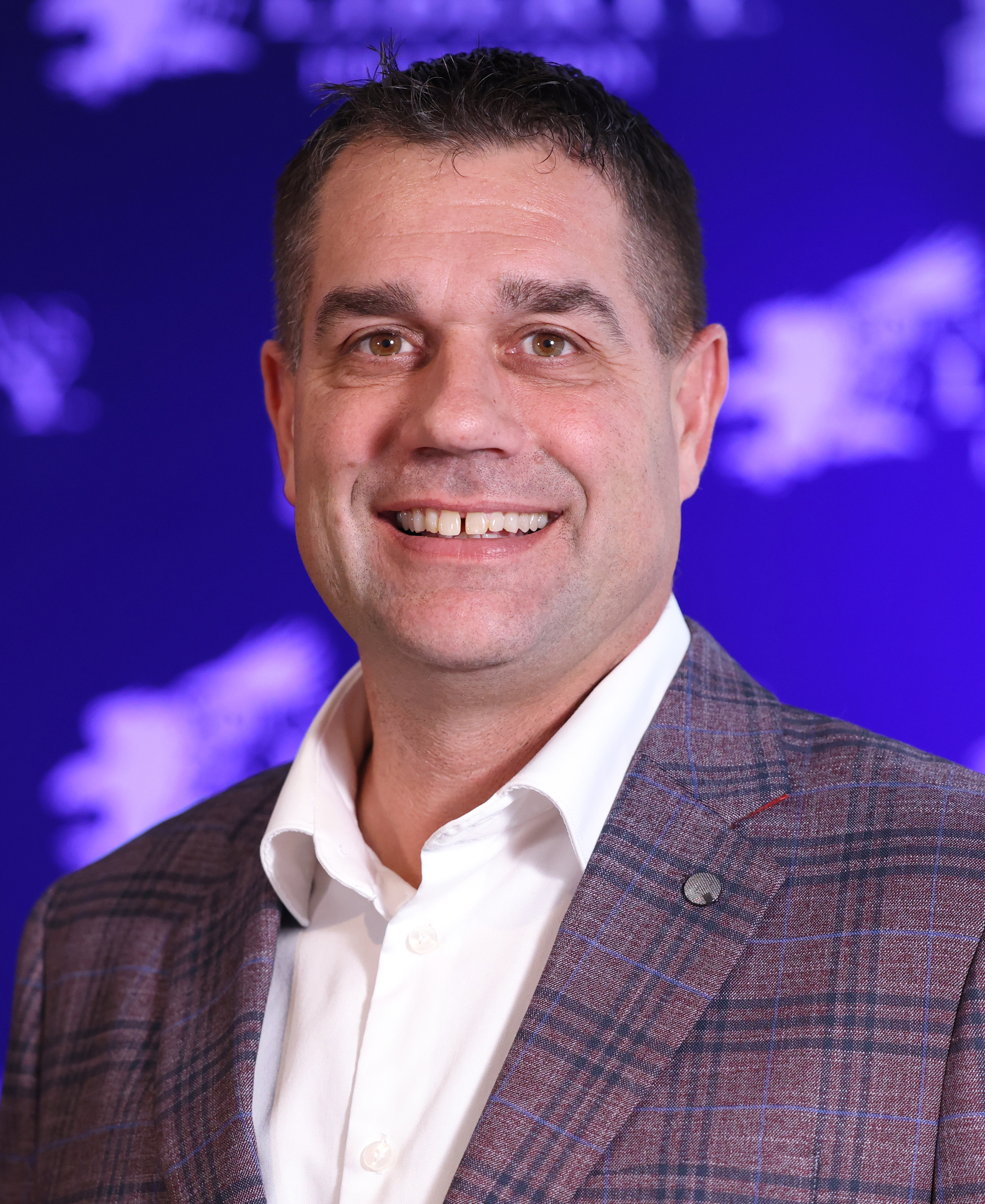
- Sjaarda at the 2024 Hazlitt Summit hosted by Young Americans for Liberty Foundation

Member of the South Dakota House of Representatives from the 2nd district
- Incumbent
- Assumed office January 10, 2023 Serving with David Kull

Personal details
- Born: November 10, 1976 (age 49)
- Party: Republican
- Profession: Farmer

John Sjaarda (born November 10, 1976) is an American politician currently serving in the South Dakota House of Representatives. First elected in 2022, he has represented South Dakota's 2nd legislative district as a Republican since 2023. He has previously worked as a farmer.
