= Brandon Wipf =

American politician

Member of the South Dakota Senate from the 22nd district
- Incumbent
- Assumed office July 2025
- Preceded by: David Wheeler

Personal details
- Party: Republican
- Education: Dordt University

Brandon R. Wipf is an American politician. He serves as a Republican member for the 22nd district in the South Dakota State Senate since 2025.

== Education ==
Wipf graduated as the valedictorian from James Valley Christian School and obtained a bachelor’s degree in electrical engineering from Dordt University in Iowa.

== Career ==
Wipf is a farmer in southern Spink County. He was appointed to the American Soybean Association Board of Directors in December 2017.

Governor Larry Rhoden appointed him to the South Dakota State Senate to replace David Wheeler.
