= Joshua Klumb =

American politician, businessman, and farmer

Member of the South Dakota Senate from the 20th district
- Incumbent
- Assumed office January 10, 2017

Personal details
- Born: Mount Vernon, South Dakota
- Party: Republican
- Spouse: Sadie
- Education: Oklahoma Wesleyan University (BS)

Joshua Klumb is an American politician, businessman, and farmer serving as a member of the South Dakota Senate from the 20th district. Elected in 2016, he assumed office on January 10, 2017.

Klumb earned a Bachelor of Science degree in business and marketing from Oklahoma Wesleyan University. He was born in Mount Vernon, South Dakota.
