= Joy Hohn =

American politician

Member of the South Dakota Senate from the 9th district
- Incumbent
- Assumed office January 14, 2025
- Preceded by: Brent Hoffman

Personal details
- Born: August 20, 1965 (age 61) Sioux Falls, South Dakota
- Party: Republican
- Education: Augustana University
- Website: www.joyhohn.com

Joy Hohn (born August 20, 1965) is an American politician. She serves as a Republican member for the 9th district in the South Dakota State Senate since 2025. Her district includes north-western Sioux Falls, Hartford and Wall Lake. Hohn works as a commercial pilot.
