= John Carley =

American politician

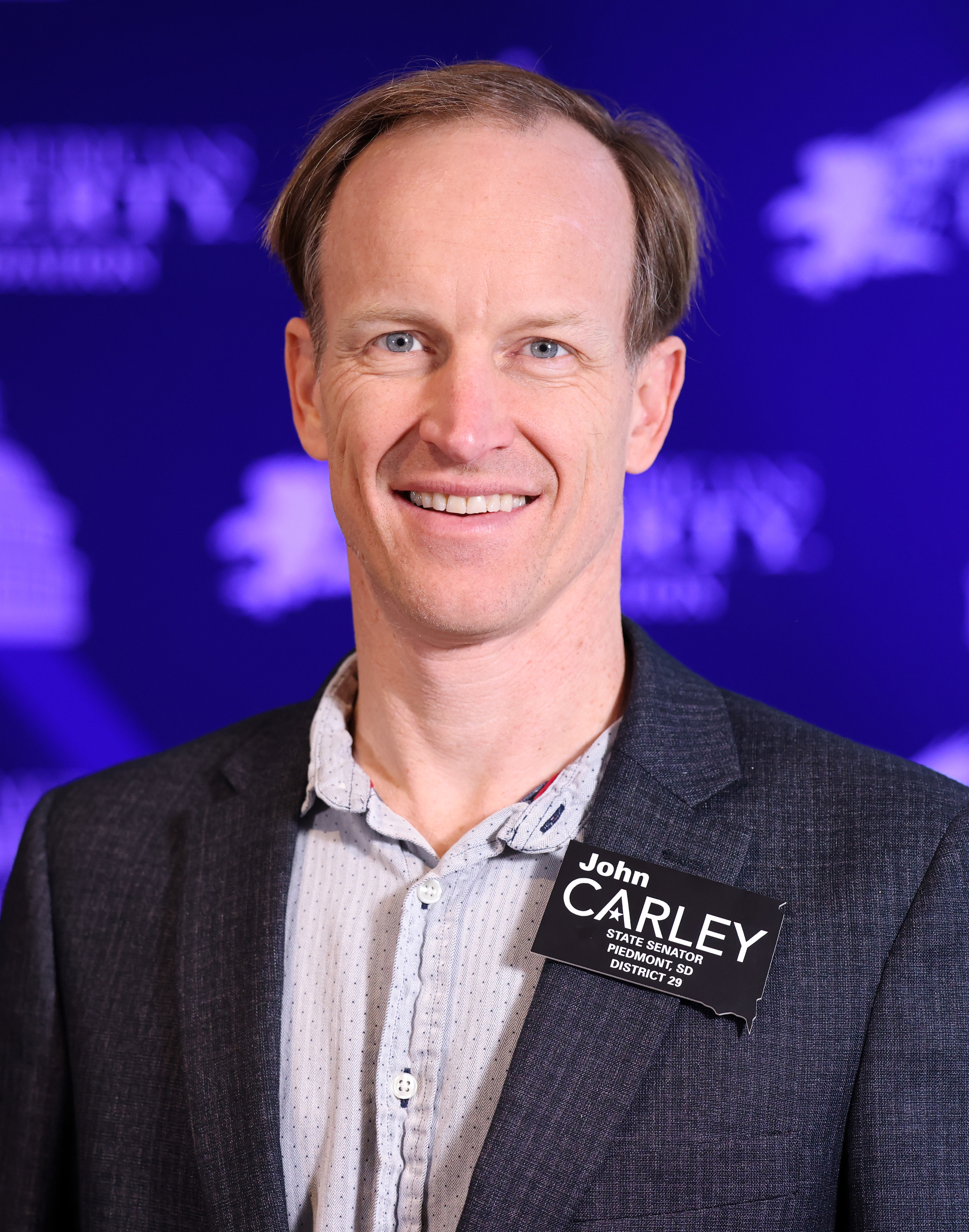
- Carley at the 2024 Hazlitt Summit hosted by Young Americans for Liberty Foundation

Member of the South Dakota Senate from the 29th district
- Incumbent
- Assumed office January 14, 2025
- Preceded by: Dean Wink

Personal details
- Born: Colorado, U.S.
- Party: Republican
- Education: Biola University

John Carley is an American politician. He serves as a Republican member for the 29th district of the South Dakota Senate and is the Vice Chairman of the South Dakota Freedom Caucus.

== Life and career ==
Carley was born in Colorado. He attended Biola University, earning his bachelor's degree in 2005.

In June 2024, Carley defeated Kirk Chaffee in the Republican primary election for the 29th district of the South Dakota Senate. No Democratic candidate or incumbent was nominated to challenge him in the general election. He succeeded Dean Wink. He assumed office on January 14, 2025.

In January 28 2025, the South Dakota Senate voted 18 to 17 for a Carley bill. The bill would mandate public schools to display the Ten Commandments in every classroom, which the bill is similar to a 2024 law passed in Louisiana.

In February 19 2026, the South Dakota Senate voted 28 to 6 for a Carley bill named the "South Dakota SAVE Act", which required only US Citizens can register to vote. It was subsequently passed by the House of Representatives and signed by the Governor on March 30 2026, immediately becoming law since an emergency clause had been placed on it, in order to have it be in effect for the primary election and subsequent elections.
