= Erin Tobin =

American politician

Member of the South Dakota Senate from the 21st district
- In office January 12, 2021 – January 14, 2025
- Preceded by: Lee Qualm
- Succeeded by: Mykala Voita

Personal details
- Party: Republican
- Spouse: Travis
- Children: 2
- Education: South Dakota State University (BS, MS)

Erin Tobin is an American politician and nurse practitioner who served as a Republican member of the South Dakota Senate from 2021 to 2025. Elected in November 2020, she assumed office on January 12, 2021 representing the 21st district of South Dakota.

== Education ==
After graduating from Colome High School in Colome, South Dakota in 2001, Tobin earned a bachelor's degree in nursing from South Dakota State University in 2005, followed by a master's degree in 2010.

== Career ==
Before becoming a politician, Tobin was a nurse practitioner who had opened a clinic in her hometown of Winner. She became involved in politics during a lobbying effort to introduce a bill in the South Dakota Legislature that would allow the state's nurses to have full practice authority. Tobin later lobbied against legislation when her predecessor, then-State House Majority Leader Lee Qualm, introduced a bill that would remove vaccination requirements for South Dakota students. In 2020, Tobin ran against Qualm in the Republican primary for a seat in the South Dakota Senate, defeating him by 22.4% of votes cast. She then defeated Democratic nominee Dan Kerner Andersson in the November general election and assumed office on January 12, 2021.

In the 2024 elections, Tobin lost a close primary to Mykala Voita by 48 votes, in a race that was defined by Tobin's support for a controversial bill that would allow construction of a new pipeline. She is running to rematch Voita in the 2026 elections.

In the Senate, Tobin sponsored a bill supported by then-Governor Kristi Noem to create increased regulation of land sales to foreign countries, such as China. Tobin supports enacting term limits for members of the United States Congress. In 2024, she became the South Dakota State Chair for the advocacy organization U.S. Term Limits.

== Personal life ==
Tobin and her ex-husband, Travis, have two children. She lives in Winner, South Dakota.
