= David Kull =

American politician

Member of the South Dakota House of Representatives from the 2nd district
- Incumbent
- Assumed office January 10, 2023 Serving with John Sjaarda

Personal details
- Party: Republican
- Profession: Retired Law Enforcement; City Council Member

David Kull is an American politician currently serving in the South Dakota House of Representatives. First elected in 2022, he has represented South Dakota's 2nd legislative district as a Republican since 2023. Previous to serving as a representative, he was a member of the Brandon city council, and was a police officer.
