= Lauren Nelson (politician) =

American politician

Member of the South Dakota Senate from the 18th district
- Incumbent
- Assumed office January 14, 2025
- Preceded by: Jean Hunhoff

Personal details
- Born: Sinai, South Dakota
- Party: Republican
- Education: South Dakota State University
- Website: laurennelsonforsenate.com

Lauren Nelson is an American politician. She serves as a Republican member for the 18th district in the South Dakota State Senate since 2025. The district includes the Yankton area.
