= Amber Hulse =

American politician (born 1998)

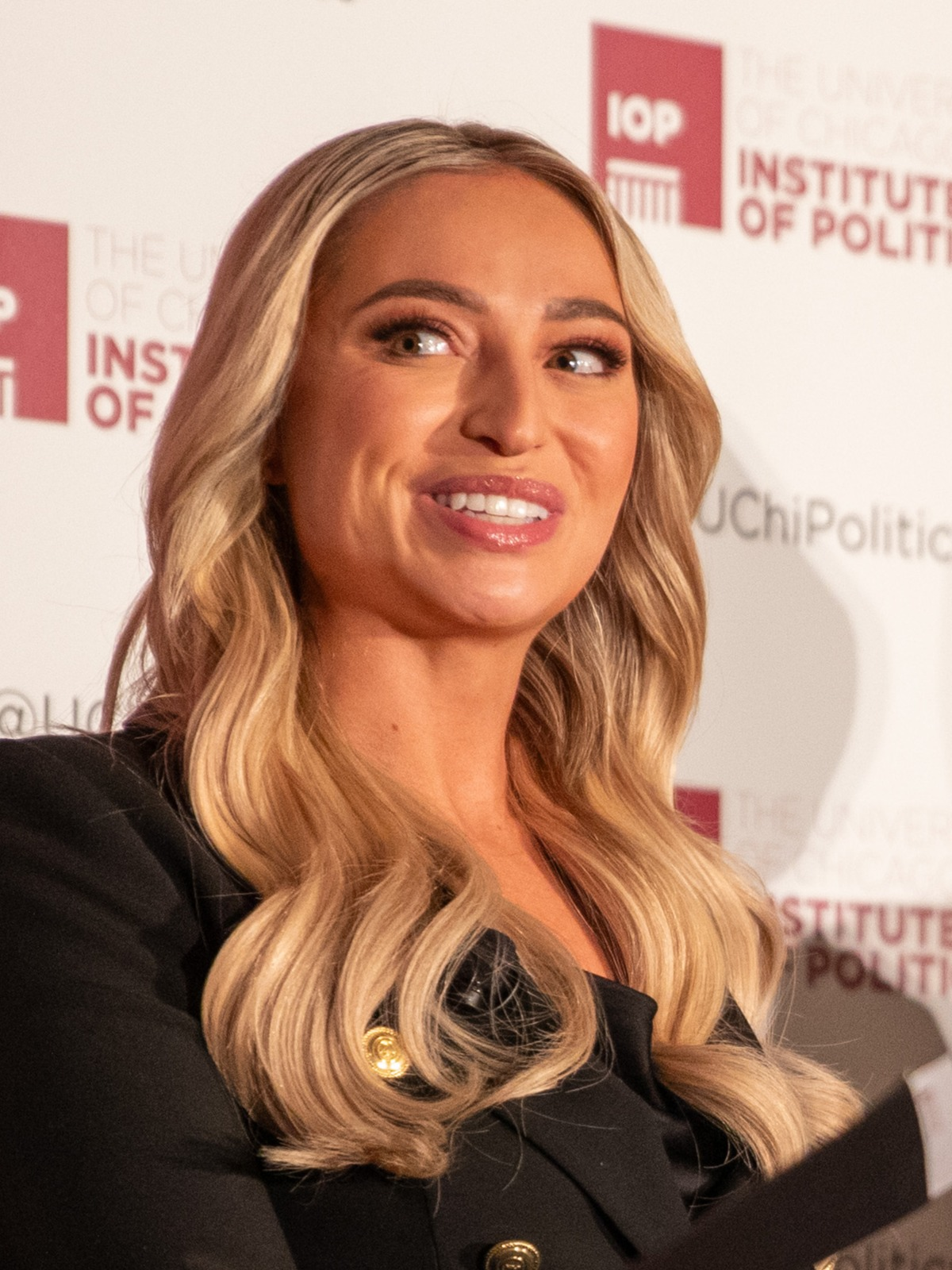
- Hulse at the University of Chicago in 2026.

Member of the South Dakota Senate from the 30th district
- Incumbent
- Assumed office January 14, 2025
- Preceded by: Julie Frye-Mueller

Personal details
- Born: September 9, 1998 (age 27)
- Party: Republican
- Education: University of South Dakota (BA); Georgetown University (JD)
- Website: Campaign website

Amber Hulse (born September 9, 1998) is an American politician who was elected member of the South Dakota Senate for the 30th district in 2024. A member of the Republican Party, she defeated incumbent Julie Frye-Mueller in the primary. She won Miss South Dakota in 2019 and Miss South Dakota USA in 2023.

Awards and achievements
Preceded by Shania Knutson	Miss South Dakota USA; 2023	Succeeded by Ahmitara Alwal
Preceded by Carrie Wintle	Miss South Dakota; 2019–20	Succeeded by Kaitlin O'Neill
