= Ryan Maher =

American politician

Member of the South Dakota Senate from the 28th district
- Incumbent
- Assumed office 2006

Personal details
- Born: August 19, 1977 (age 49) Mobridge, South Dakota
- Party: Republican
- Education: Black Hills State University
- Occupation: Banker; business owner

Ryan M. Maher is an American politician who has served as a Republican member of the South Dakota Senate, representing the 28th district since 2006.
