= Glen Vilhauer =

American politician

Member of the South Dakota Senate from the 5th district
- Incumbent
- Assumed office January 14, 2025

Personal details
- Born: April 1, 1958 (age 68)
- Party: Republican
- Education: University of South Dakota

Glen Vilhauer (born April 1, 1958) is an American politician. He has served as a member of the South Dakota Senate since 2025, representing the 5th district. He is a member of the Republican Party.
