= Paul Miskimins =

American politician

Member of the South Dakota House of Representatives from the 20 district
- Incumbent
- Assumed office 2019

Personal details
- Party: Republican

Paul R. Miskimins is a South Dakota politician in the South Dakota Senate. He served in the South Dakota House of Representatives.
