= Brent Hoffman =

South Dakota state senator

Brent "B.R." Hoffman (born May 7, 1963) is an American writer, military veteran, and politician currently serving as a State Senator in South Dakota for District 9, including western Sioux Falls, Hartford, and Wall Lake.

He is a Republican and served in the military. He is a survivor of the September 11, 2001 attack on the Pentagon.

== Early life and education ==
Hoffman received an associate degree from the University of Maryland in 1987, a bachelor's degree from Newman University in 1989, and a Master of Business Administration from the University of South Dakota in 1993.

== Career ==
From 1983 to 2003, Hoffman served a 20-year active-duty career in the U.S. Air Force. He served as a nuclear weapons officer. In 2022, he ran for the state senate seat in District 9, facing a 15-year incumbent state representative, and was elected by a margin of more than 2-1.

== Sponsored legislation ==
- SB133 — Modify the design of license plates to include the state motto (“Under God, the People Rule”)
- SB146 – Limit parole for violent offenders

== Book ==
- Life After a Biography (2012) – ISBN 9781449769574
