= Marc Feinstein =

American politician

Member of the South Dakota House of Representatives from the 14th district
- In office 2007–2015
- Succeeded by: Larry Zikmund

Personal details
- Born: February 24, 1953 (age 73) Mitchell, South Dakota
- Party: Democratic
- Spouse: Nancy
- Education: Stanford University, University of South Dakota, University of Florida
- Profession: Attorney

Marc S. Feinstein is a Democratic member of the South Dakota House of Representatives, representing District 14 from 2007 to 2015.
