= Kevin D. Jensen =

American politician

Member, South Dakota House of Representatives, District 16
- Incumbent
- Assumed office January 10, 2017
- Preceded by: Jim Bolin

Personal details
- Born: August 18, 1954 (age 71)
- Party: Republican

Kevin D. Jensen (born August 18, 1954) is an American politician in the South Dakota Senate. He is a Republican representing District 16 in the South Dakota House of Representatives.

== Political career ==
Jensen ran for election to represent one of District 16's two seats in 2012 and 2014, but lost the Republican primaries. In 2016, he ran again and won, and was re-elected in 2018. He is running for another term in 2020.

As of October 2020, Jensen sat on the following committees:

- Health and Human Services (Chair)
- State Affairs
- Joint Health & Human Services Interim Committee (Co-chair)
- Mental Health Services Delivery Task Force (Chair)

Jensen has served as a Majority Whip since 2019.

=== Electoral record ===
2012 Republican primary: South Dakota House of Representatives, District 16
Party	Candidate	Votes	%
Republican	Jim Bolin	864	40.9%
Republican	Patty Miller	513	24.3%
Republican	Kevin D. Jensen	459	21.8%
Republican	Don Lantis	274	13.0%

2014 Republican primary: South Dakota House of Representatives, District 16
Party	Candidate	Votes	%
Republican	Jim Bolin	1,329	42.1%
Republican	David Anderson	1,049	33.2%
Republican	Kevin D. Jensen	778	24.7%

2016 Republican primary: South Dakota House of Representatives, District 16
Party	Candidate	Votes	%
Republican	David Anderson	1,164	40.56%
Republican	Kevin D. Jensen	872	30.38%
Republican	Bill Shorma	834	29.06%

2016 general election: South Dakota House of Representatives, District 16
Party	Candidate	Votes	%
Republican	David Anderson	6,620	33.14%
Republican	Kevin D. Jensen	5,972	29.90%
Democratic	Ann Tornberg	4,489	22.47%
Democratic	Ted Curry	2,895	14.49%

In 2018, Anderson and Jensen were unopposed in the Republican primary.

2018 general election: South Dakota House of Representatives, District 16
Party	Candidate	Votes	%
Republican	Kevin D. Jensen	6,121	34.7%
Republican	David Anderson	5,739	32.5%
Democratic	Chad Skiles	2,995	17.0%
Democratic	Mike Steinbrecher	2,806	15.9%

2020 Republican primary: South Dakota House of Representatives, District 16
Party	Candidate	Votes	%
Republican	Kevin D. Jensen	1,444	38.3%
Republican	David Anderson	1,257	33.3%
Republican	William Shorma	1,072	28.4%
