= Mark Lapka =

American politician

Member of the South Dakota Senate from the 23rd district
- Incumbent
- Assumed office January 14, 2025

Personal details
- Party: Republican
- Website: www.lapkaforsd.com

Mark Lapka is an American politician. He serves as a Republican member for the 23rd district in the South Dakota State Senate since 2025. Lapka is a farmer and rancher.
