= Bryan Breitling =

American politician

Member of the South Dakota Senate from the 23rd district
- Incumbent
- Assumed office January 12, 2021
- Preceded by: John Lake

Personal details
- Born: Hoven, South Dakota, U.S.
- Party: Republican
- Children: 3
- Education: Northern State University (BS); University of Sioux Falls (MHA)

Military service
- Branch/service: United States Army
- Unit: Army National Guard

Bryan J. Breitling is an American politician serving as a member of the South Dakota Senate from the 23rd district. Elected in November 2020, he assumed office on January 12, 2021.

== Early life and education ==
Breitling was born in Hoven, South Dakota and graduated from Roscoe High School. He served in the Army National Guard for 11 years before earning a Bachelor of Science degree in business from Northern State University and a Master of Healthcare Administration from the University of Sioux Falls.

== Career ==
Prior to entering politics, Breitling worked as a healthcare administrator at nursing homes and hospitals around South Dakota. He was elected to the South Dakota Senate in November 2020 and assumed office on January 12, 2021. He is the vice chair of the Senate Appropriations Committee.

In April 2021, Breitling became the chair of a newly established legislative committee to study implementation of recreational and medical marijuana programs in the state.
