= J. Sam Marty =

American politician

Member of the South Dakota House of Representatives from the 28th (B) district
- In office January 13, 2015 – January 10, 2023 Serving with Dean Schrempp

Personal details
- Born: November 8, 1947 (age 78)
- Party: Republican
- Spouse: Leah Marty
- Children: 5
- Profession: Rancher

John Samuel "Sam" Marty (born November 8, 1947) is an American politician in the South Dakota Senate. He served as a Republican member for the 28th district in the South Dakota House of Representatives starting in 2015. He left office on January 10, 2023. He was unable to run for re-election in 2022 due to term limits.
