= Liz Larson =

American politician

Minority Leader of the South Dakota Senate
- Incumbent
- Assumed office January 14, 2025
- Preceded by: Reynold Nesiba

Member of the South Dakota Senate from the 10th district
- Incumbent
- Assumed office January 10, 2023
- Preceded by: Margaret Sutton

Personal details
- Party: Democratic
- Education: Evergreen State College (BA); University of Oregon (MA)

Liz Larson is an American politician and member of the South Dakota Senate from the 10th district since 2023. She served as the minority whip from 2023 to 2025 and has served as minority leader since 2025. She is a member of the Democratic party.

== Committee assignments ==
Senate Agriculture and Natural Resources Committee - Member
Senate Local Government Committee - Member
Senate Select Committee on Discipline and Expulsion - Member
Senate Transportation Committee - Member

== Electoral history ==
2022 District 10 general election
Party	Candidates	Votes	Percent
Democratic	Liz Larson	4,488	56.7%
Republican	Margaret Sutton	3,429	43.3%
Total votes		7,917	100%

2022 District 10 Democratic primary (cancelled)
Party	Candidates	Votes	Percent
Democratic	Liz Larson	Unopposed	

2020 District 13 general election
Party	Candidates	Votes	Percent
Republican	Jack Kolbeck	7,490	56.3%
Democratic	Liz Larson	5,819	43.3%
Total votes		13,309	100%

2020 District 13 Democratic primary (cancelled)
Party	Candidates	Votes	Percent
Democratic	Justyn Hauck (withdrew)	Unopposed	

South Dakota Senate
Preceded by Reynold Nesiba	Minority Leader of the South Dakota Senate; 2025–present	Incumbent
