= Mykala Voita =

American politician

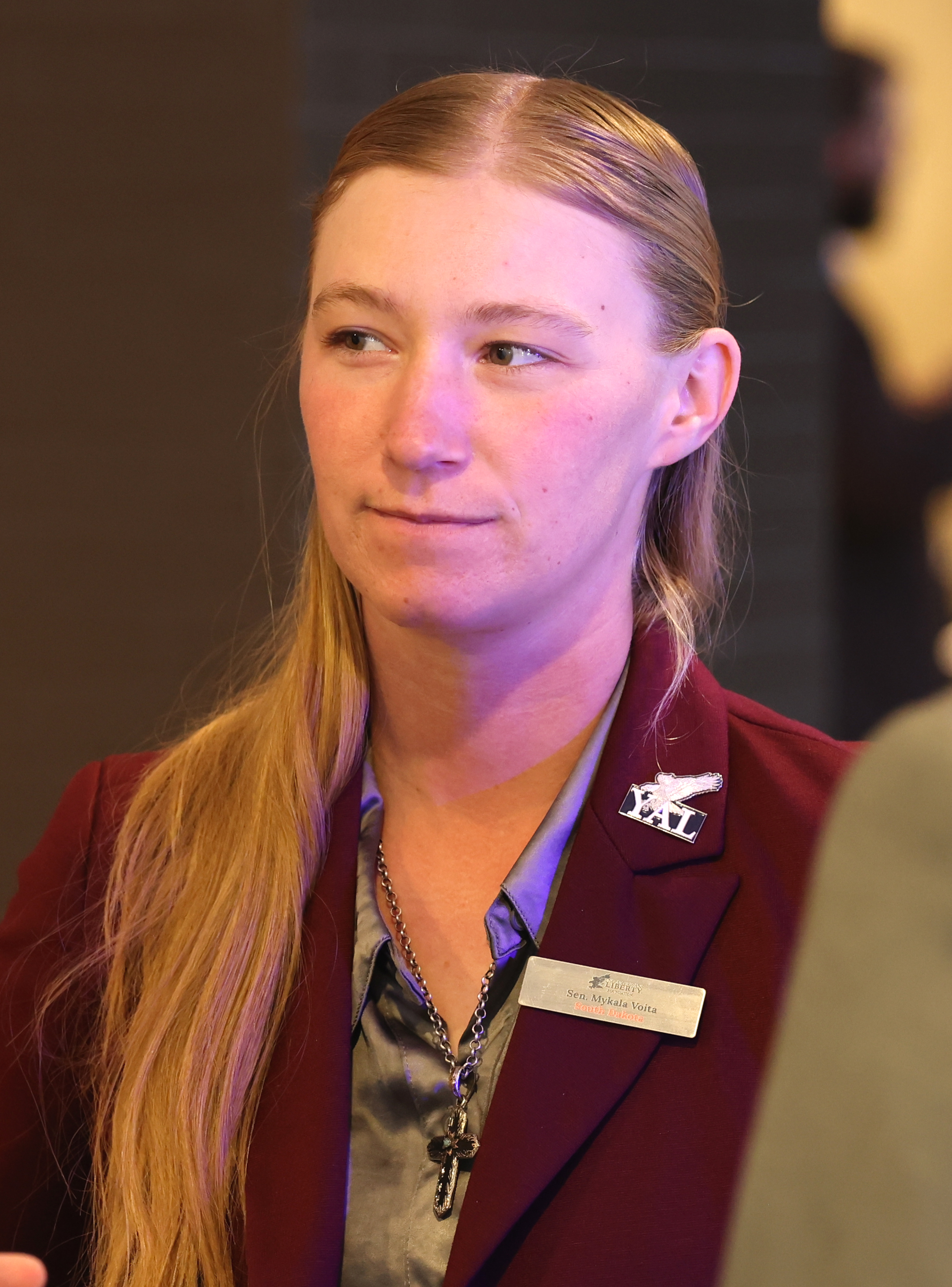
- Voita at the 2024 Hazlitt Summit hosted by Young Americans for Liberty Foundation

Member of the South Dakota Senate from the 21st district
- Incumbent
- Assumed office January 14, 2025
- Preceded by: Erin Tobin

Personal details
- Born: March 22, 1998 (age 28)
- Party: Republican

Mykala Voita (born March 22, 1998) is an American politician. She serves as a Republican member for the 21st district of the South Dakota Senate. She was first elected in 2024, defeating incumbent Erin Tobin in the Republican primary. Voita is a member of the State's Senate Appropriations Committee and the Joint Committee on Appropriations.

== Career ==
Voita was first elected to the Senate in 2024, defeating incumbent Senator Erin Tobin by 48 votes in the Republican primary. The race was defined by Tobin's support for a bill that would allow the construction of a new pipeline, with Voita basing much of her primary campaign on the rights of landowners. She then easily defeated Democrat Dan Andersson in the general election. Voita, Tobin, and Andersson are all running again in the 2026 election.

On February 18, 2025, Voita spoke in opposition to a bill that would have raised the age to marry in South Dakota to 18-years-old. She said the issue was personal to her as she was once "two months away from being in an underage marriage," but ultimately they decided to wait. She voted no to passing the bill. Voita also supports passing legislation to require transgender people to use the bathrooms and other gendered public facilities corresponding to their assigned gender at birth.

In March 2025, three pro-gun bills she sponsored were signed by Governor Larry Rhoden, including a bill that repealed no-gun zones at locations that served alcohol, and a bill that allows concealed carry permit holders to carry their guns on college campuses, the latter of which Voita claimed was to allow students to defend themselves.
