= South Dakota's 18th legislative district =

American legislative district

South Dakota's 18th State Senate district

South Dakota's 18th legislative district is one of 35 districts in the South Dakota Legislature. Each district is represented by 1 senator and 2 representatives. In the Senate, it has been represented by Republican Jean Hunhoff since 2021. In the House, it has been represented by Republicans Julie Auch since 2023 and Mike Stevens since 2021.

== Geography ==
The district is located within Clay and Yankton County in southeastern South Dakota. Its largest city is Yankton.
