= Chris Karr =

American businessman and politician

President pro tempore of the South Dakota Senate
- Incumbent
- Assumed office January 14, 2025
- Preceded by: Lee Schoenbeck

Member of the South Dakota House of Representatives from the 11th district
- Incumbent
- Assumed office January 10, 2017
- Preceded by: Jim Stalzer

Personal details
- Born: 1979 or 1980 (age 45–46) Tabor, South Dakota, U.S.
- Party: Republican
- Education: South Dakota State University (BS); University of South Dakota (MBA)

Chris Karr (born 1989/1990) is an American businessman and politician serving as a member of the South Dakota House of Representatives from the 11th district. Karr assumed office on January 10, 2017.

== Early life and education ==
Karr is a native of Tabor, South Dakota. He earned a Bachelor of Science degree in business economics from South Dakota State University and a Master of Business Administration from the University of South Dakota.

== Career ==
Karr has operated a small business in Sioux Falls, South Dakota and also worked as a Certified Valuation Analyst. A member of the Republican Party, Karr serves as one of five Majority Whips in the South Dakota House of Representatives.

South Dakota Senate
Preceded by Lee Schoenbeck	President pro tempore of the South Dakota Senate; 2025–present	Incumbent
