= Helene Duhamel =

American politician and journalist

Member of the South Dakota Senate from the 32nd district
- Incumbent
- Assumed office December 3, 2019
- Preceded by: Alan Solano

Personal details
- Born: July 13, 1962 (age 64) Palo Alto, California, U.S.
- Party: Republican
- Education: Stanford University (BA)

Helene Duhamel (born July 13, 1962) is an American politician and journalist serving as a member of the South Dakota Senate from the 32nd district.

== Career ==
After graduating from college, she worked as a news anchor for KDUH in Scottsbluff, Nebraska. In 1989, she returned to Rapid City.

Duhamel was appointed to the Senate by Governor Kristi Noem in 2019 to fill the vacancy left by Alan Solano. Duhamel had previously served as a television news anchor for KOTA-TV and as the public information office for the Pennington County Sheriff’s Office.

== Electoral history ==
In 2020, Duhamel ran for re-election to the South Dakota State Senate to represent District 32; she was unopposed in the Republican primary. Duhamel beat Democratic challenger Michael Calabrese by 64% to 36%. Calabrese was a small business owner and served on the Rapid City Board of Parks and Recreation.

2020 General Election: South Dakota State Senate District 32
Party	Candidate	Votes	%
Republican	Helene Duhamel	7,397	64%
Democratic	Michael Calabrese	4,413	36%

== Legislative History ==
=== 2020 Legislative Session ===
After her appointment to the State Senate, Duhamel represented District 32 during the 2020 South Dakota Legislative Session.

Senate Committee Membership
Position	Committee
Vice-Chair	Local Government
Member	Health and Human Services

Duhamel also served on the Local Government Interim Committee and as the Vice Chair of the Health and Human Services Interim Committee.

Duhamel's 2020 Prime Sponsored Legislation
Bill Number	Bill Title
HB 1056	revise drone surveillance protections
SB 60	adopt the Physical Therapist Licensure Compact
SB 61	revise certain provisions regarding a municipal office nominating petition
SB 70	revise the offenses for which an order for interception of communications may be granted

In 2020, all four pieces of legislation that Duhamel prime sponsored were passed into law and signed by the Governor Kristi Noem.
