= Randy Deibert =

American politician

Member of the South Dakota Senate from the 31st district
- Incumbent
- Assumed office January 10, 2023
- Preceded by: Timothy Johns

Personal details
- Born: July 31, 1958 (age 68)
- Party: Republican
- Website: https://deibert4senate31.com/

Randy Deibert (born July 31, 1958) is an American politician who has served in the South Dakota Senate from the 31st district since 2023. His district has the same borders as Lawrence County.
