= Tom Pischke =

American politician

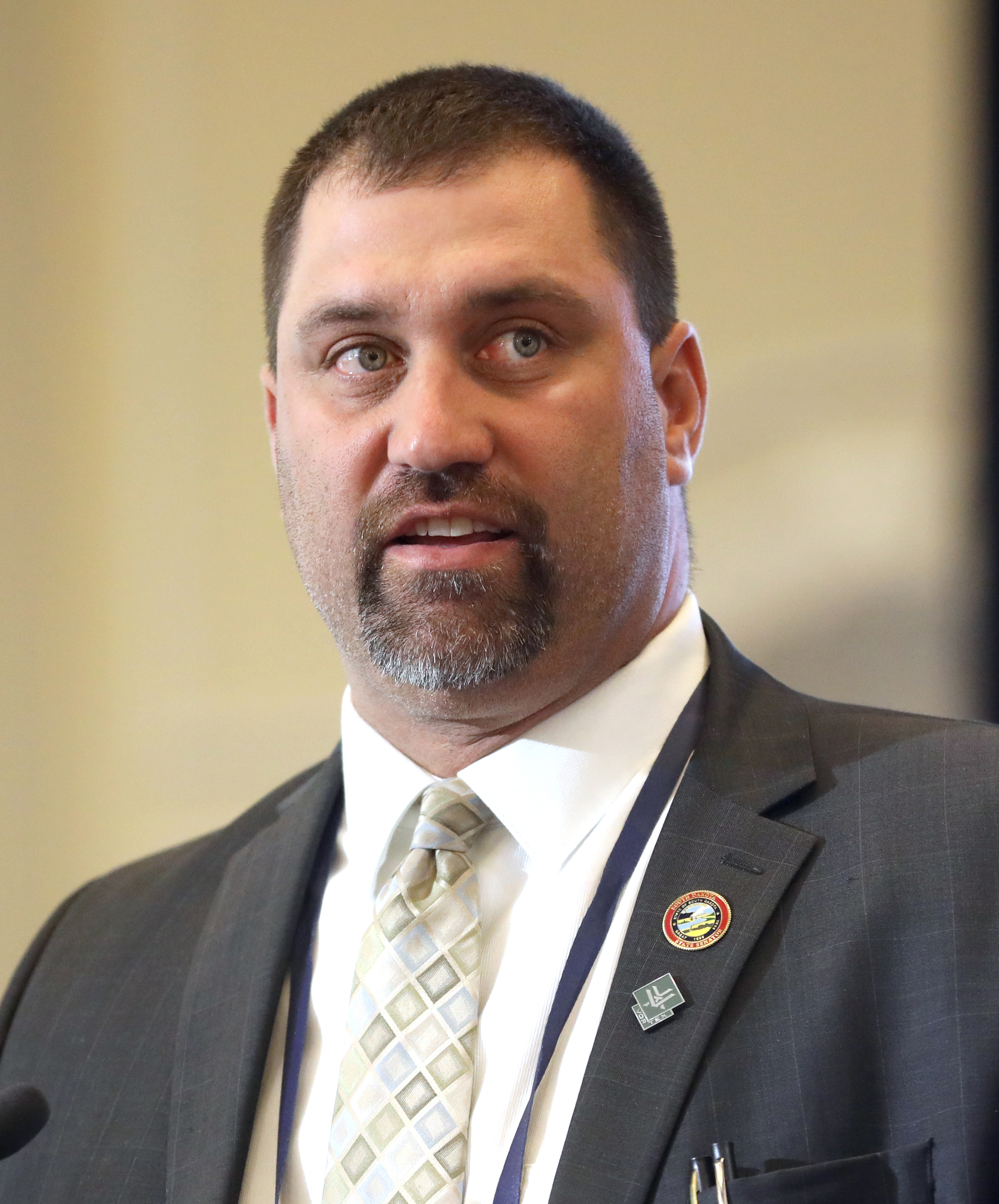

Member of the South Dakota Senate from the 25th district
- Incumbent
- Assumed office 2023

Member of the South Dakota House of Representatives from the 25th district
- In office 2017–2023

Personal details
- Born: May 4, 1982 (age 44)
- Party: Republican
- Education: Dakota State University

Tom Pischke (born May 4, 1982) is an American politician in the South Dakota Senate. He served in the South Dakota House of Representatives from the 25th district since 2017.

In 2026, Pischke was charged with knowingly submitting a falsified or forged document. The charges accuse Pischke of falsifying signatures to put candidates for state party positions without their knowledge.

== Election history ==
South Dakota Senate District 25 General Election, 2024
| Party | Candidate | Votes | % |
|---|---|---|---|
| Republican | Tom Pischke | 9667 | 72.7 |
| Democrat | Brian Wirth | 3634 | 27.3 |

South Dakota Senate District 25 Primary Election, 2024
| Party | Candidate | Votes | % |
|---|---|---|---|
| Republican | Tom Pischke | 1371 | 67.7 |
| Republican | Jordan Youngberg | 654 | 32.3 |

South Dakota Senate District 25 General Election, 2022
| Party | Candidate | Votes | % |
|---|---|---|---|
| Republican | Tom Pischke | 7868 | 100.0 |

South Dakota Senate District 25 Primary Election, 2022
| Party | Candidate | Votes | % |
|---|---|---|---|
| Republican | Tom Pischke | 1396 | 45.1 |
| Republican | Leslie J. Heinemann | 672 | 21.7 |
| Republican | Lisa Rave | 591 | 19.1 |
| Republican | Kevin Crisp | 439 | 14.2 |

South Dakota House of Representatives District 25 General Election, 2020
| Party | Candidate | Votes | % |
|---|---|---|---|
| Republican | Jon Hansen | 7826 | 32.9 |
| Republican | Tom Pischke | 7784 | 32.7 |
| Democrat | Jeff Barth | 4460 | 18.7 |
| Democrat | Jared Nieuwenhuis | 3720 | 15.6 |

South Dakota House of Representatives District 25 General Election, 2018
| Party | Candidate | Votes | % |
|---|---|---|---|
| Republican | Jon Hansen | 5982 | 32.00 |
| Republican | Tom Pischke | 5272 | 28.20 |
| Democrat | Dan Ahlers | 5174 | 27.68 |
| Democrat | B.J. Motley | 2266 | 12.12 |

South Dakota House of Representatives District 25 General Election, 2016
| Party | Candidate | Votes | % |
|---|---|---|---|
| Republican | Tom Pischke | 6398 | 31.22 |
| Democrat | Dan Ahlers | 5432 | 26.50 |
| Republican | Roger Hunt | 5399 | 26.34 |
| Democrat | David Haagenson | 3266 | 15.94 |
