= Steve Kolbeck =

American politician

Member of the South Dakota Senate from the 2nd district
- Incumbent
- Assumed office January 10, 2023
- Preceded by: Brock Greenfield

Member of the South Dakota Public Utilities Commission
- In office 2006–2011
- Succeeded by: Kristie Fiegen

Personal details
- Party: Republican, Democratic (formerly)
- Children: 4
- Education: Mitchell Technical College (AAS); South Dakota State University (BS)

Steve Kolbeck is an American politician serving as a member of the South Dakota Senate for the 2nd district. Elected in November 2022, he assumed office on January 10, 2023.

== Education ==
Kolbeck earned an associate of applied science degree in telecommunications from Mitchell Technical College and a Bachelor of Science degree from South Dakota State University.

== Career ==
Kolbeck was elected to the South Dakota Public Utilities Commission in November 2006 and served until 2011 as a member of the South Dakota Democratic Party. To date, he is the last Democrat to win a non-Federal statewide election in the state and the last Democrat to win statewide at all with no incumbency advantage.

He was also a member of the Brandon City Council. Outside of politics, he is a principal manager at Xcel Energy. Kolbeck was elected to the South Dakota Senate in November 2022 and assumed office on January 10, 2023.
