= David Wheeler (South Dakota politician) =

American attorney and politician

Member of the South Dakota Senate from the 22nd district
- In office January 12, 2021 – April 24, 2025
- Preceded by: Jim White
- Succeeded by: Brandon Wipf

Personal details
- Born: November 24, 1979 (age 46) Huron, South Dakota, U.S.
- Party: Republican
- Education: University of South Dakota (BA, MPA, JD)

David Wheeler (born November 24, 1979) is an American attorney and politician who served as a member of the South Dakota Senate from the 22nd district. Elected in November 2020, he assumed office on January 12, 2021.

== Early life and education ==
Wheeler was born in Huron, South Dakota. He earned a Bachelor of Arts degree in political science, Master of Public Administration, and Juris Doctor from the University of South Dakota.

== Career ==
Wheeler has worked as an attorney for Blue, Wheeler & Banks LLP in Huron. He was also a member of the Huron School Board for seven year and was appointed to serve on the South Dakota Lottery Commission by Governor Dennis Daugaard. He was elected to the South Dakota Senate in November 2020 and assumed office on January 12, 2021. He resigned in April 2025 after being appointed to a judicial position.
