= Jim Mehlhaff =

American politician

Majority Leader of the South Dakota Senate
- Incumbent
- Assumed office January 14, 2025
- Preceded by: Casey Crabtree

Member of the South Dakota Senate from the 24th district
- Incumbent
- Assumed office January 10, 2023
- Preceded by: Mary Duvall

Personal details
- Party: Republican
- Education: Northern State University (attended)
- Website: Campaign website

Jim Mehlhaff is an American politician who has served in the South Dakota Senate from the 24th district since 2023. His district contains the counties of Haakon, Hughes, Hyde, Stanley and Sully. Mehlhaff is a business owner and a public servant.

South Dakota Senate
Preceded by Casey Crabtree	Majority Leader of the South Dakota Senate; 2025–present	Incumbent
