= Michael Rohl (politician) =

American politician

Mike Rohl

Member of the South Dakota Senate from the 1st district
- Incumbent
- Assumed office January 12, 2021
- Preceded by: Susan Wismer

Personal details
- Born: Michael H. Rohl
- Party: Republican
- Education: Drake University (BS)

Michael H. Rohl is an American politician serving as a member of the South Dakota Senate from the 1st district. Elected in November 2020, he assumed office on January 12, 2021.

== Education ==
Rohl earned a Bachelor of Science degree from Drake University.

== Career ==
Outside of politics, Rohl is a small business owner. He was elected to the South Dakota Senate in November 2020 and assumed office on January 12, 2021. He is also a member of the Senate Judiciary Committee, Senate Health and Human Services Committee, and Senate State Affairs Committee. Rohl also is the Senate Chair of State Tribal Relations Committee.

During his tenure in the Senate, Rohl has successfully authored 21 bills into law, and has received 1 Gubernatorial Veto. Perhaps best known for his success in advocating for marijuana reform in South Dakota. In his first session Rohl was the architect of stopping the 2021 House Bill 1100, in its original form from passing the Senate, which sought to strike from law South Dakota’s voter approved medical marijuana program before it could take effect. The bill was supported by Governor Kristi Noem and leadership in both legislative chambers. He was also the prime sponsor of Senate Bill 3, which would have legalized recreational marijuana for adults 21+. SB 3 passed the Senate 18-17 after Rohl held together a bipartisan coalition to support the measure against the wishes of Governor Kristi Noem and Legislative Leadership. It later failed in the House of Representatives 28-40. The South Dakota Senate is the most conservative legislative body in the United States to have passed a cannabis legalization bill through a chamber of the legislature.
