= Kyle Schoenfish =

American politician

Member of the South Dakota Senate from the 19th district
- Incumbent
- Assumed office January 6, 2020
- Preceded by: Stace Nelson

Member of the South Dakota House of Representatives from the 19th district
- In office January 11, 2013 – January 6, 2020
- Succeeded by: Marty Overweg

Personal details
- Born: November 1, 1987 (age 38)
- Party: Democratic (until 2010); Republican (2010-present)
- Education: Dakota Wesleyan University

Kyle Schoenfish (/ˈʃeɪnfɪʃ/ SHAYN-fish; born November 1, 1987) is an American politician serving as a Republican member of the South Dakota Senate. Schoenfish had previously served as a member of the South Dakota House of Representatives, representing District 19 since January 11, 2013.

== Education ==
Schoenfish graduated from Dakota Wesleyan University.

== Elections ==
- 2012 When District 19 incumbent Democratic Representative Frank Kloucek running to return to the South Dakota Senate and Edward Van Gerpen leaving the Legislature, incumbent Senator Jim Putnam seeking to return to the House and incumbent Republican Representative Stace Nelson redistricted from District 25, Schoenfish ran in the four-way June 5, 2012 Republican Primary Representative Nelson placed first and Schoenfish placed second with 1,299 votes (29.6%) ahead of Senator Putnam; in the three-way November 6, 2012 General election, Representative Nelson took the first seat and Schoenfish took the second seat with 6,550 votes (38.05%) ahead of Democratic nominee Alan Fenner.
- 2010 When District 19 incumbent Republican Representatives Jim Putnam was term limited and ran for South Dakota Senate and Bill Van Gerpen was term limited and retired leaving both House District 19 seats open, Schoenfish and Senator Frank Kloucek were unopposed for the June 8, 2010 Democratic Primary where Schoenfish placed second; in the four-way November 2, 2010 General election, Schoenfish lost to Republican Edward Van Gerpen who took the first seat, and Senator Kloucek who took the second seat.
