= Casey Crabtree =

American politician

Majority Leader of the South Dakota Senate
- In office January 10, 2023 – January 14, 2025
- Preceded by: Gary Cammack
- Succeeded by: Jim Mehlhaff

Member of the South Dakota Senate from the 8th district
- Incumbent
- Assumed office June 19, 2020
- Preceded by: Jordan Youngberg

Personal details
- Born: January 28, 1983 (age 43)
- Party: Republican
- Children: 2
- Education: Northern State University (BA)

Casey Crabtree (born January 28, 1983) is an American politician serving as a member of the South Dakota Senate from the 8th district. Crabtree was appointed to office by Governor Kristi Noem on June 19, 2020, succeeding Jordan Youngberg, who resigned to serve with the South Dakota State Treasurer.

Crabtree and his wife have two children. They live in Madison, South Dakota.

== Career ==
Crabtree is the Director of Economic Development at Heartland Consumer Power District in Madison, South Dakota.

== Electoral record ==
In 2020, Crabtree ran for election to continue representing District 8 in the South Dakota State Senate. He was unopposed in the Republican primary and general election; he received 7,829 votes.

2020 General Election: South Dakota State Senate District 8
Party	Candidate	Votes	%
Republican	Casey Crabtree	7,829	100.00%

== Legislative history ==
=== Legislative leadership ===
In 2021, Crabtree was elected by the Senate Republican Caucus to serve as one of four Senate Majority Whips. During this same time he served as Chair of the Senate Commerce and Energy Committee and Vice Chair of the Workforce Housing Needs in SD Interim Committee.

=== 2021 South Dakota Legislative Session ===
During the 2021 South Dakota Legislative Session, Crabtree prime sponsored seven pieces of legislation. Topics of that legislation ranged from rural infrastructure to certified registered nurse anesthetists recruitment. Crabtree also co-sponsored 39 pieces of legislation including Senate Concurrent Resolutions in support of keeping the U.S. Supreme Court at nine members and support of removing barriers to country of origin labeling.

Senate Committee Membership
Position	Committee
Chair	Commerce and Energy
Member	Legislative Procedure
Member	Joint Legislative Procedure
Member	Legislative Redistricting Committee
Member	State Affairs
Member	Transportation
Vice-Chair	Workforce Housing Needs in SD Interim Study

=== 2021 South Dakota Special Legislative Sessions ===
The Legislature met for two special session in 2021, the first for legislative redistricting and the second to discuss the possible impeachment of Attorney General Jason Ravnsborg. Crabtree, a member of the Senate Legislative Redistricting Committee, was a sponsor of the "Blackbird" map which eventually became the chosen map after the South Dakota House of Representatives' proposed map failed. The new adopted legislative districted would place Crabtree in District 8, comprising Lake, Kingsbury, and parts of Brookings and Kingsbury counties. Crabtree signed the a petition in support of the second special session.

=== 2022 South Dakota Legislative Session ===
Senate Committee Membership
Position	Committee
Chair	Commerce and Energy
Member	Joint Legislative Procedure
Member	Senate Legislative Procedure
Member	State Affairs
Member	Transportation

South Dakota Senate
Preceded by Gary Cammack	Majority Leader of the South Dakota Senate; 2023–2025	Succeeded by Jim Mehlhaff
