= Larry Zikmund =

American politician

Member of the South Dakota House of Representatives from the 14th district
- Incumbent
- Assumed office 2015 Serving with Erin Healy
- Preceded by: Marc Feinstein
- Succeeded by: Taylor Rae Rehfeldt (elect)

Personal details
- Born: January 25, 1946 (age 80) Comstock, Nebraska, U.S.
- Party: Republican
- Spouse: Judi
- Children: 2 daughters
- Profession: Association Management/Educator

Larry P. Zikmund (born January 25, 1946) is an American politician in the South Dakota Senate. He served as a Republican member for District 14 in the South Dakota House of Representatives beginning in 2015. Zikmund serves on the Commerce and Energy and Transportation Committees and chairs the Military and Veterans affairs and Retirement Laws Committees. His motto is "Experienced. Trusted. Committed" (stylised in all caps).

== Personal life ==
Zikmund has a wife named Judi, two daughters, and five grandchildren.
