= South Dakota Republican Party =

South Dakota affiliate of the Republican Party

- Chairperson: Jim Eschenbaum
- Senate Leader: Kris Langer
- House Leader: Lee Qualm
- Headquarters: P.O. Box 1099. Pierre, South Dakota 57501
- Membership (2021): ▲279,921
- Ideology: Conservatism
- National affiliation: Republican Party
- Colors: Red, White, Blue
- Seats in the Senate: 32 / 35
- Seats in the House: 65 / 70
- Statewide offices: 12 / 13

Election symbol

Website
- www.sdgop.com

The South Dakota Republican Party is the affiliate of the Republican Party in South Dakota. It is currently the dominant party in the state, controlling South Dakota's at-large U.S. House seat, both U.S. Senate seats, the governorship, and has supermajorities in both houses of the state legislature. State Sen. John Wiik has served as the party's chairman since 2023.

== Current elected officials ==
The South Dakota Republican Party controls all ten statewide offices and holds supermajorities in the South Dakota Senate and the South Dakota House of Representatives. Republicans also hold both of the state's U.S. Senate seats and the state's at-large congressional seat.

=== Federal ===
==== U.S. Senate ====
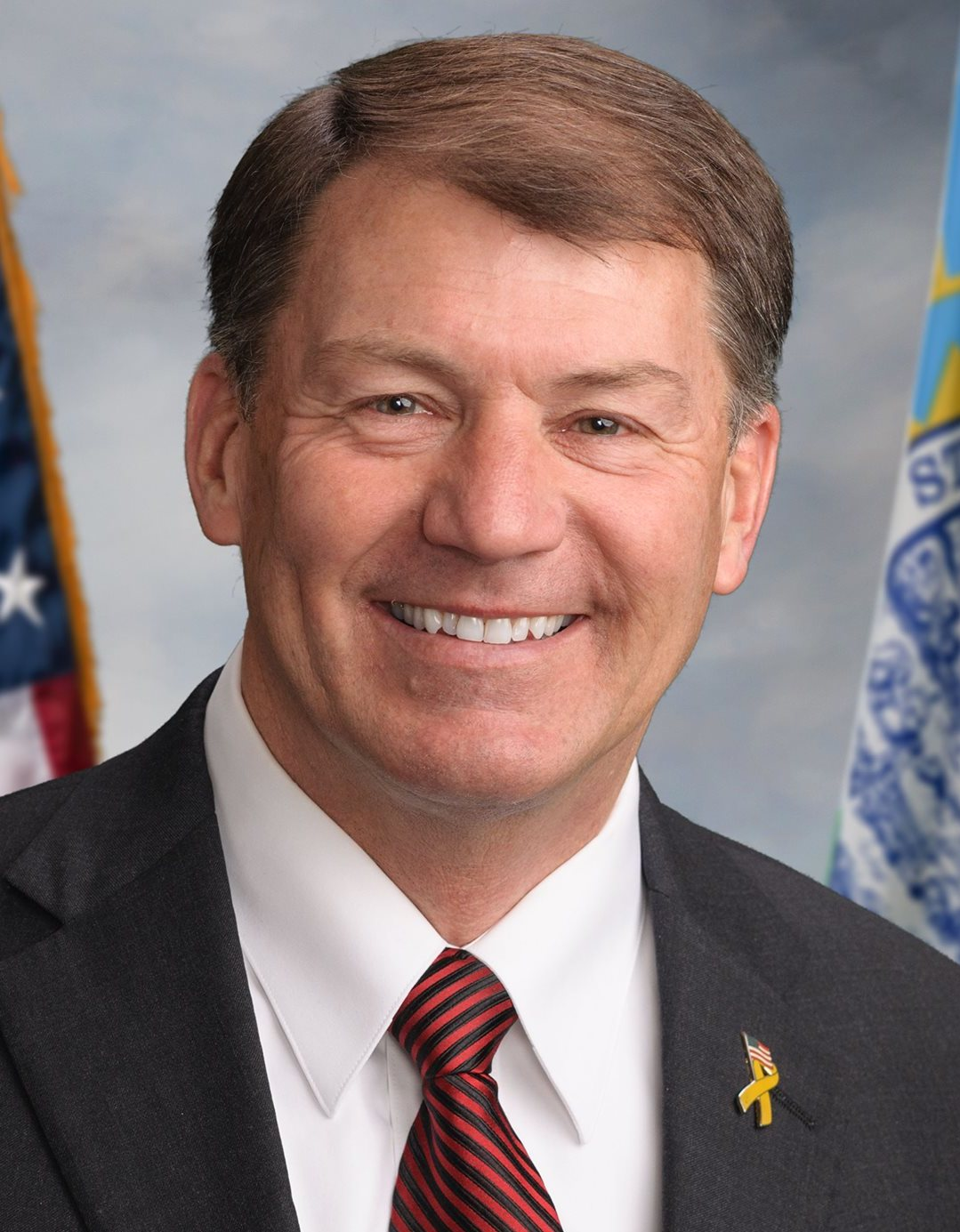
Junior U.S. Senator Mike Rounds

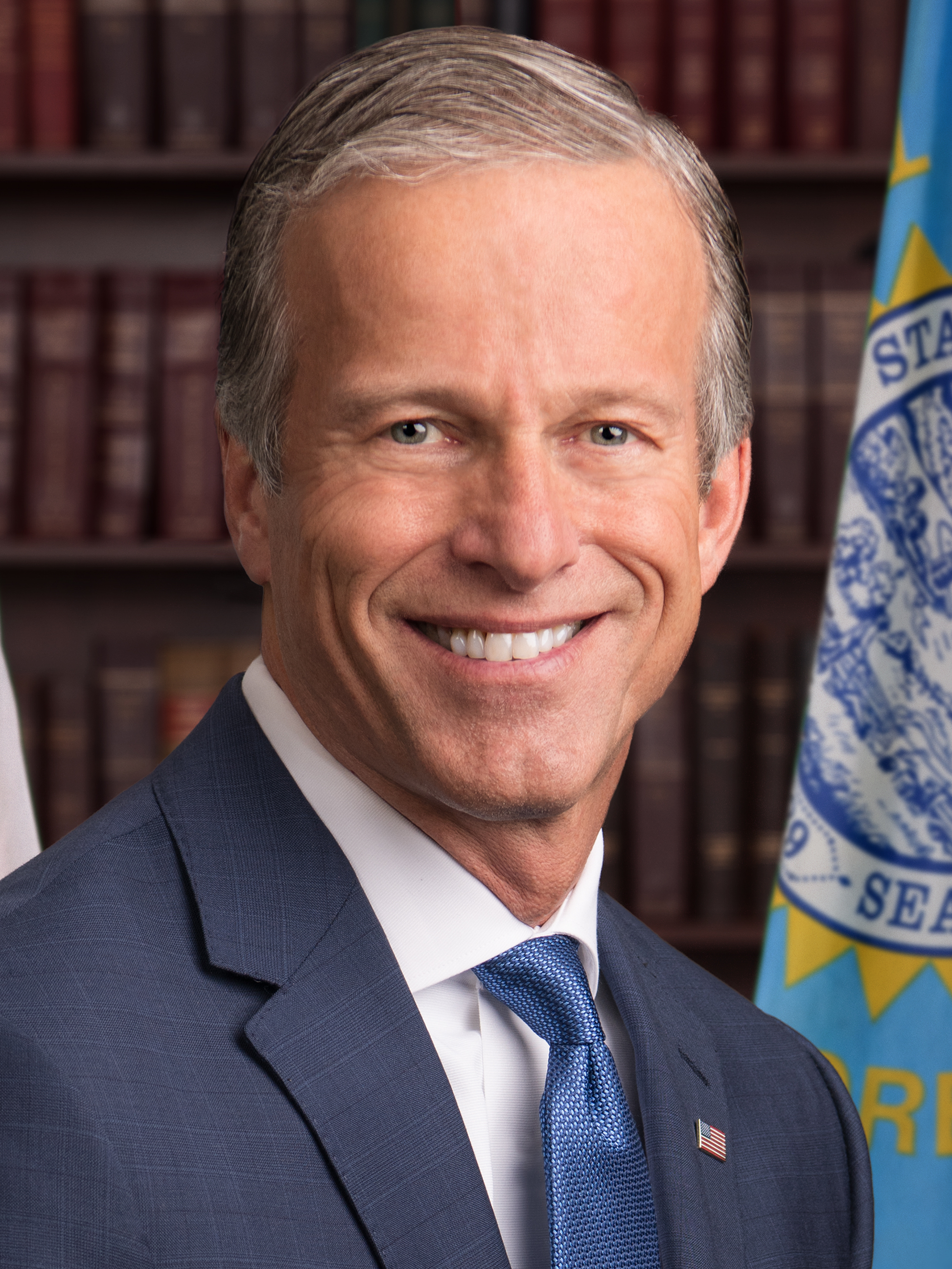
Senior U.S. Senator John Thune
(Majority Leader)

==== U.S. House of Representatives ====
District	Member	Photo
At-large	Dusty Johnson	
At-large	Marty Jackley (elect)	

=== State ===
- Governor: Larry Rhoden
- Lieutenant Governor: Tony Venhuizen
- Secretary of State: Monae Johnson
- Attorney General: Marty Jackley → Larry Russell (elect)
- State Auditor: Rich Sattgast → Catherine Barranco (elect)
- State Treasurer: Josh Haeder → Melissa Hull (elect)
- Commissioner of School and Public Lands: Ryan Brunner
- Public Utilities Commissioner: Kristie Fiegen
- Public Utilities Commissioner: Chris Nelson
- Public Utilities Commissioner: Gary Hanson

== Electoral history ==
=== Gubernatorial ===
South Dakota Republican Party gubernatorial election results
Election	Gubernatorial Ticket	Votes	Vote %	Result
1994	Bill Janklow/Carole Hillard	172,515	55.36%	Won ✓
1998	Bill Janklow/Carole Hillard	166,621	64.04%	Won ✓
2002	Mike Rounds/Dennis Daugaard	189,920	56.77%	Won ✓
2006	Mike Rounds/Dennis Daugaard	206,990	61.69%	Won ✓
2010	Dennis Daugaard/Matt Michels	195,024	61.51%	Won ✓
2014	Dennis Daugaard/Matt Michels	195,477	70.47%	Won ✓
2018	Kristi Noem/Larry Rhoden	172,912	50.97%	Won ✓
2022	Kristi Noem/Larry Rhoden	217,035	61.98%	Won ✓
2026	Larry Rhoden/Tony Venhuizen	193,335	63.49%	Won ✓

== See also ==
- South Dakota Democratic Party
