= David Johnson (South Dakota politician) =

American politician

Member of the South Dakota Senate from the 33rd district
- Incumbent
- Assumed office January 12, 2021
- Preceded by: Phil Jensen

Member of the South Dakota House of Representatives from the 33rd district
- In office January 10, 2017 – January 12, 2021 Serving with Taffy Howard (2017-2021)

Personal details
- Party: Republican
- Spouse: Karen Johnson
- Children: 3
- Education: South Dakota School of Mines and Technology (BS); University of South Dakota (MBA)
- Profession: Arborist

David Johnson is an American politician serving in the South Dakota Senate from the 33rd district. Prior to his election to the State Senate, he served two terms in the South Dakota House of Representatives as one of the two representatives from the 33rd district.

Johnson earned a Bachelor of Science degree from the South Dakota School of Mines and Technology and a Master of Business Administration from the University of South Dakota.

== Election history ==
=== South Dakota Senate ===
- In November 2020, Johnson was elected to the South Dakota Senate when he received 11,369 votes defeating Ryan A. Ryder who received 5,317 votes. In June 2020, Johnson ran for the South Dakota Senate and received 2,264 votes in the primary defeating Janet Jensen, wife of legislator, Phil Jensen, who received 1,807 votes.

=== South Dakota House of Representatives ===
- In November 2018, Johnson was re-elected with 6,094 votes along with Rep.Taffy Howard who received 5,662 votes, they defeated Lills Jarding who received 3,537 votes and Nick Reid who received 2,316 votes. In June 2018, Johnson received 2,215 votes along with Taffy Howard who received 2,183 votes and they advanced to the general election after defeating Melanie Torno who received 1,212 votes.
- In November 2016, Johnson was elected to the South Dakota House of Representatives with 8,245 votes along with Taffy Howard who received 7,018 votes and they defeated Jim Hadd who received 3,226 votes and Ethan Marsland who received 2,777 votes. In June 2016, Johnson received 2,235 votes and advanced from the primary along with Taffy Howard who received 1,792 votes and they defeated Mike Buckingham who received 1,099 votes.
