= South Dakota Legislature =

Bicameral state legislature of South Dakota

Type
- Type: Bicameral
- Houses: Senate; House of Representatives

Leadership
- Senate President: Tony Venhuizen (R) since January 30, 2025
- Senate President pro tempore: Chris Karr (R) since January 14, 2025
- House Speaker: Jon Hansen (R) since January 14, 2025

Structure
- Seats: 105 voting members: 35 Senators; 70 Representatives
- Senate political groups: Republican (32); Democratic (3); Vacant (0)
- House political groups: Republican (64); Democratic (6); Vacant (0)

Elections
- Last Senate election: November 5, 2024
- Last House election: November 5, 2024
- Next Senate election: November 3, 2026
- Next House election: November 3, 2026

Meeting place
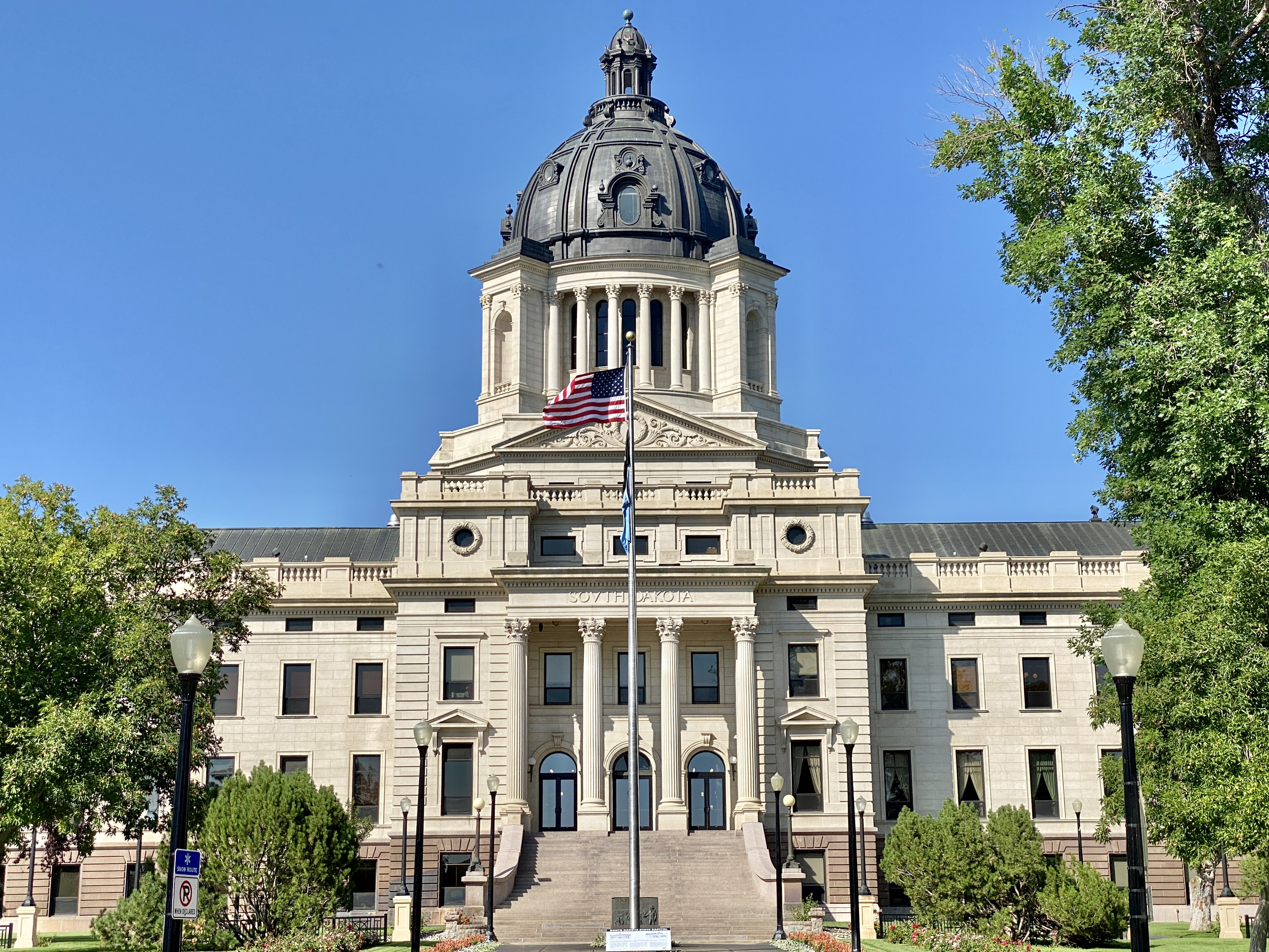
- South Dakota State Capitol; Pierre

Website
- http://sdlegislature.gov/

The South Dakota Legislature is the legislative branch of the government of South Dakota. It is a bicameral legislative body, consisting of the South Dakota Senate, which has 35 members, and the South Dakota House of Representatives, which has 70 members. The two houses are similar in most respects; the Senate and House hold the right to confirm gubernatorial appointments to certain offices. In addition, the Senate votes by roll call vote, whereas the larger house uses an electronic voting system.

The legislature meets at the South Dakota State Capitol in Pierre. It begins its annual session of the second Tuesday of January each year. The legislative session lasts 40 working days in odd-numbered years, and 35 days working days in even numbered years. Though, in recent years, the legislature has completed its work in 38 working days in both even numbered years as well as odd numbered years. Generally, the legislature meets for four out of every five business days each week until the session ends, excepting on the last day which is delayed to allow for consideration of gubernatorial vetoes. This schedule enables legislators to have one working day each week at home in their districts to meet with constituents as well as to tend to other personal matters. In addition, the legislature occasionally meets on Saturdays to make-up for recesses on holidays such as Presidents' Day and Martin Luther King, Jr. Day.

The legislature selects, from its membership, an executive board to tend to administrative matters during the time when the legislature is not in session. The administrative support for the legislature is provided by the South Dakota Legislative Research Council.

The Republican Party of South Dakota has held a supermajority in the state senate since the 1996 election, and in the state house since the 1976 election.

== Selection of state legislators ==
Members of both houses of the state legislature are elected in November of every even-numbered year to serve a two-year term. Since 1993, legislators have been limited to serving four consecutive 2-year terms in a single house, but there is no limit on the number of non-consecutive terms a legislator may serve. A legislator who serves the limit is eligible for election again after 2 years. Vacancies in the legislature are filled by gubernatorial appointment.

State legislators are elected from 35 legislative districts; each multi-member district elects one senator and two representatives. In 33 districts, representatives are elected at-large from the entire district. District 26 and 28, however, are divided into two house districts, each of which elects one representative. This is intended to ensure that Native Americans can elect representatives of their choice.

Legislative districts are redrawn every ten years, following the United States census. In 2021, South Dakota enacted new state legislative districts after the legislature approved a compromise between two competing proposals. Both chambers voted to approve the final proposal, known as the Sparrow map, on November 10, 2021. The House approved the new districts in a 37-31 vote and the Senate by a vote of 30-2. Gov. Kristi Noem (R) later signed the proposal into law.

== See also ==
- South Dakota Legislative Research Council
- South Dakota House of Representatives
- South Dakota Senate
- South Dakota State Capitol
- Governor of South Dakota
- Lieutenant Governor of South Dakota
- Elections in South Dakota
- List of South Dakota state legislatures
- Legislature
- Bicameralism
