= South Dakota Democratic Party =

South Dakota affiliate of the Democratic Party

- Chairperson: Shane Merrill
- Headquarters: Sioux Falls, SD
- National affiliation: Democratic Party
- Colors: Blue
- Seats in the South Dakota Senate: 3 / 35
- Seats in the South Dakota House of Representatives: 5 / 70
- Statewide Offices: 0 / 13

Website
- www.sddp.org

The South Dakota Democratic Party is the affiliate of the Democratic Party in the U.S. state of South Dakota. The party currently has very weak electoral power in the state, controlling none of South Dakota's statewide or federal elected offices.

Important members in the history of the South Dakota Democratic Party include Dick Kneip, Jim Abourezk, George McGovern, Tom Daschle, Tim Johnson and Stephanie Herseth Sandlin.

== History ==
The Democrats won South Dakota's first U.S. Senate election by popular vote, held in 1914, with their first statewide elected official, Edwin S. Johnson. This was their first success since William Jennings Bryan successfully campaigned (a novelty at the time) for the state's electoral votes in 1896 with help from an agrarian crisis. Nevertheless, it was not until the sweeping elections of 1932 that the Democratic Party took firm control as the party of the New Deal. With supermajorities in the state legislature and control of the governorship, the Democrats were able to set about securing newly available federal aid, replacing property tax with income and sales taxes, and instituting unemployment insurance.

While Democrats managed only one solid two-year election cycle in the 1940s and 1950s, a young two-term House member and Kennedy administration veteran with a strong understanding of agricultural policy, George McGovern, changed the party's fortunes when he squeaked out a win against incumbent Joe Foss in 1962's Senate election. An ardent opponent of the Vietnam War, McGovern's popularity and profile were on an upward trajectory that would only be shadowed by his presidential run in 1972. Despite his landslide loss to Republican incumbent Richard Nixon, he continued to serve in the U.S. Senate for nine more years as his party came to power at the state level.

Following the New Dealers tenuous agreement with the farmers and workers of South Dakota and The Boy Orator of the Platte's persuasion of voters on his "Whirlwind through the Midwest", the South Dakota Democratic Party surged in numbers. This time, they used two decades of farm politics and McGovern's election bid to gain a one-seat majority in the Senate and an even slimmer tie-breaking control in the House. This strategy also brought SD Democrats a re-election win by Governor Richard F. Kneip. An electronic voter base and get-out-the-vote operation helped many Democrats overcome long-time Republican incumbents.

At about the same time in 1968, South Dakota Democrats gained a relatively small but increasingly active voting group when the Indian Civil Rights Act was passed. Since then, the state has created house districts 28A (in 1996) and 26A (in 2012) as majority-minority districts.

Since their heyday in the 1970s, South Dakota Democrats have since seen their influence decline in the state. Currently, 31% of South Dakota voters are registered as Democrats compared to 46% registered as Republicans, and only 11 of 105 state house and senate delegates are Democrats.

== Current elected leaders ==
The South Dakota Democratic Party does not hold any of the statewide offices and is a minority in both the South Dakota Senate and the South Dakota House of Representatives. Democrats do not have any members in the state's U.S. congressional delegation.

State

- Three seats in the State Senate and five seats in the State House

Federal

- None

=== Legislative leaders ===
- Senate Minority Leader: Liz Larson
- Assistant Senate Minority Leader: Jamie Smith
- Senate Minority Whip: None
- House Minority Leader: Erin Healy
- Assistant House Minority Leader: Eric Emery
- House Minority Whips: Kadyn Wittman and Nicole Uhre-Balk

== Election results ==
=== Gubernatorial ===
South Dakota Democratic Party gubernatorial election results
Election	Gubernatorial candidate	Votes	Vote %	Result
1970	Richard F. Kneip	131,616	54.85%	Won ✓
1972	Richard F. Kneip/Bill Dougherty	185,012	60.03%	Won ✓
1974	Richard F. Kneip/Harvey Wollman	149,151	53.61%	Won ✓
1978	Roger D. McKellips/Billie Sutton	112,679	43.37%	Lost ✗
1982	Mike O'Connor/Willis Danokas	81,136	20.13%	Lost ✗
1986	Lars Herseth/Ted Thoms	141,898	48.19%	Lost ✗
1990	Bob Samuelson/Shirley K. Halleen	105,525	41.10%	Lost ✗
1994	Jim Beddow/James W. Abbott	126,273	40.52%	Lost ✗
1998	Bernie Hunhoff/Elsie Meeks	85,473	32.85%	Lost ✗
2002	James W. Abbott/Michael Wilson	140,263	41.92%	Lost ✗
2006	Jack Billion/Eric Abrahamson	121,226	36.13%	Lost ✗
2010	Scott Heidepriem/Ben Arndt	529,851	38.49%	Lost ✗
2014	Susan Wismer/Susy Blake	70,549	25.43%	Lost ✗
2018	Billie Sutton/Michelle Lavallee	161,454	47.60%	Lost ✗
2022	Jamie Smith/Jennifer Healy Keintz	123,148	35.17%	Lost ✗
2026	Dan Ahlers/Steven McCleerey	111,161	36.51%	Lost ✗
