= South Dakota Senate =

Upper house of the South Dakota State Legislature

- South Dakota Legislature

Type
- Type: Upper house
- Term limits: 4 terms (8 years)

History
- New session started: January 14, 2025

Leadership
- President: Tony Venhuizen (R) since January 30, 2025
- President pro tempore: Chris Karr (R) since January 14, 2025
- Majority Leader: Jim Mehlhaff (R) since January 14, 2025
- Minority Leader: Liz Larson (D) since January 14, 2025

Structure
- Seats: 35
- Political groups: Majority party: Republican (32); Minority party: Democratic (3)
- Length of term: 2 years
- Authority: Article III, South Dakota Constitution
- Salary: $12,850.80/session + $151 per legislative day (Note: Legislative pay must be one-fifth of median household income of South Dakota)

Elections
- Last election: November 5, 2024 (35 seats)
- Next election: November 3, 2026 (35 seats)
- Redistricting: Legislative control

Meeting place
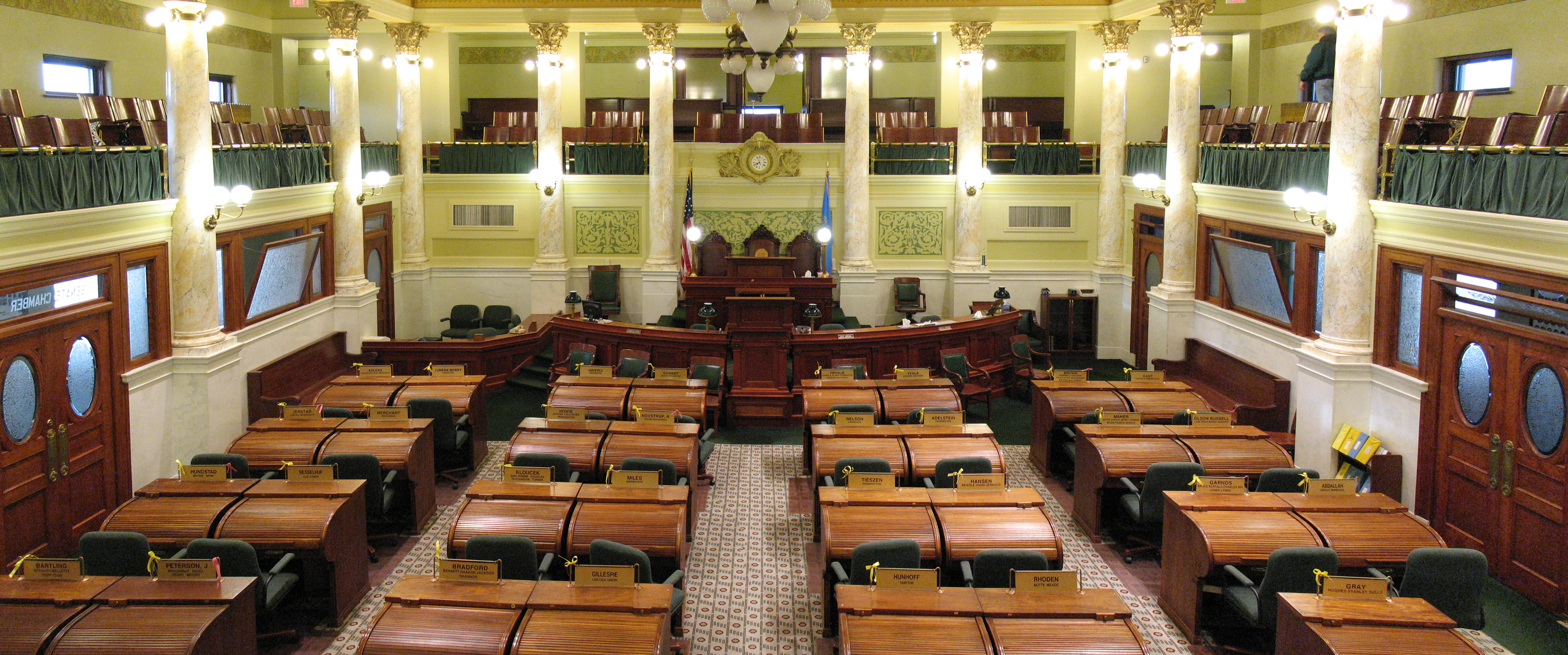
- State Senate Chamber; South Dakota State Capitol; Pierre, South Dakota

Website
- South Dakota State Legislature

The South Dakota Senate is the upper house of the South Dakota Legislature, the state legislature of the U.S. state of South Dakota. The lower house is the South Dakota House of Representatives. It consists of 35 members, one representing each legislative district, who can serve up to four consecutive two-year terms. It meets at the South Dakota State Capitol in Pierre.

== Composition ==
99th Legislature (2025)

Affiliation	Party (Shading indicates majority caucus)		Total
Affiliation	Republican	Democratic	Total
92nd Legislature	32	3	35
98th Legislature	31	4	35
99th Legislature	32	3	35
Latest voting share	91%	9%	

=== Officers ===
Position	Name	Party	District
President Pro Tem of the Senate	Chris Karr	Republican	11
Majority Leader	Jim Mehlhaff	Republican	24
Assistant Majority Leader	Carl Perry	Republican	34
Majority Whips	Randy Deibert	Republican	31
Majority Whips	Kevin Jensen	Republican	16
Majority Whips	Sue Peterson	Republican	13
Majority Whips	Tom Pischke	Republican	25
Minority Leader	Liz Larson	Democratic	10
Assistant Minority Leader	Jamie Smith	Democratic	15
Minority Whip	None	N/A	

=== List of current senators ===
Current makeup of the South Dakota Senate

District	Name	Party	Start	Residence	Counties
1st	Michael Rohl	Republican	2021	Aberdeen	Brown, Day, Marshall, Roberts
2nd	Steve Kolbeck	Republican	2023	Brandon	Brown, Clark, Hamlin, Spink
3rd	Carl Perry	Republican	2025	Aberdeen	Brown
4th	Stephanie Sauder	Republican	2025	Bryant	Clark, Codington, Deuel, Grant, Hamlin, Roberts
5th	Glen Vilhauer	Republican	2025	Watertown	Codington
6th	Ernie Otten	Republican	2025	Tea	Lincoln
7th	Tim Reed	Republican	2023	Brookings	Brookings
8th	Casey Crabtree	Republican	2020	Madison	Lake, Miner, Moody, Sanborn
9th	Joy Hohn	Republican	2025	Hartford	Minnehaha
10th	Liz Larson	Democratic	2023	Sioux Falls	Minnehaha
11th	Chris Karr	Republican	2025	Sioux Falls	Minnehaha
12th	Arch Beal	Republican	2023	Sioux Falls	Lincoln, Minnehaha
13th	Sue Peterson	Republican	2025	Sioux Falls	Lincoln, Minnehaha
14th	Larry Zikmund	Republican	2021	Sioux Falls	Minnehaha
15th	Jamie Smith	Democratic	2025	Sioux Falls	Minnehaha
16th	Kevin Jensen	Republican	2025	Canton	Lincoln, Turner, Union
17th	Sydney Davis	Republican	2023	Burbank	Clay, Union
18th	Lauren Nelson	Republican	2025	Yankton	Clay, Yankton
19th	Kyle Schoenfish	Republican	2020	Scotland	Bon Homme, Douglas, Hanson, Hutchinson, McCook
20th	Paul Miskimins	Republican	2025	Mitchell	Davison, Jerauld, Miner, Sanborn
21st	Mykala Voita	Republican	2025	Bonesteel	Aurora, Charles Mix, Douglas, Gregory, Tripp
22nd	Brandon Wipf	Republican	2025	Lake Byron	Beadle, Kingsbury
23rd	Mark Lapka	Republican	2025	Leola	Brown, Campbell, Edmunds, Faulk, Hand, McPherson, Potter, Walworth
24th	Jim Mehlhaff	Republican	2023	Pierre	Hughes, Hyde, Stanley, Sully
25th	Tom Pischke	Republican	2023	Dell Rapids	Minnehaha
26th	Tamara Grove	Republican	2025	Lower Brule	Brule, Buffalo, Hughes, Hyde, Jones, Lyman, Mellette, Todd
27th	Red Dawn Foster	Democratic	2019 (term limited)	Pine Ridge	Bennett, Haakon, Jackson, Oglala Lakota, Pennington
28th	Sam Marty	Republican	2025	Prairie City	Butte, Corson, Dewey, Harding, Perkins, Ziebach
29th	John Carley	Republican	2025	Piedmont	Meade
30th	Amber Hulse	Republican	2025	Hot Springs	Custer, Fall River, Pennington
31st	Randy Deibert	Republican	2023	Spearfish	Lawrence
32nd	Helene Duhamel	Republican	2019 (term limited)	Rapid City	Pennington
33rd	Curt Voight	Republican	2025	Rapid City	Meade, Pennington
34th	Taffy Howard	Republican	2025	Rapid City	Pennington
35th	Greg Blanc	Republican	2025	Rapid City	Pennington

== See also ==
- South Dakota House of Representatives
- Members of the South Dakota State Senate (1889–present)
- List of South Dakota state legislatures
