= Richard Vasgaard =

American politician (1950–2025)

Member of the South Dakota House of Representatives from the 16th district
- In office January 14, 2025 – August 27, 2025 Serving with Karla Lems
- Preceded by: Kevin D. Jensen
- Succeeded by: John Shubeck

Member of the South Dakota House of Representatives from the 17th district
- In office January 12, 2021 – January 12, 2023 Serving with Sydney Davis
- Preceded by: Nancy Rasmussen; Ray Ring
- Succeeded by: Karla Lems; Kevin D. Jensen

Personal details
- Born: March 18, 1950 Sioux Falls, South Dakota, U.S.
- Died: August 27, 2025 (aged 75) Centerville, South Dakota, U.S.
- Party: Republican
- Spouse: Joyce
- Children: 1
- Education: South Dakota State University (BS)

Richard George Vasgaard (March 18, 1950 – August 27, 2025) was an American politician. He served as a Republican member for the 17th district in the South Dakota House of Representatives from January 12, 2021 to January 10, 2023. Vasgaard was a farmer and received a bachelor's degree in agronomy from South Dakota State University. After redistricting in 2022, he was defeated in a primary for a second term. He was later elected to a new term in the House in November 2024.

Vasgaard was married to Joyce and had two children. He died in a farming accident on August 27, 2025, at the age of 75.

== Election history ==
- 2020 Vasgaard was elected with 4,786 votes; Sydney Davis was also elected with 5,278 votes. They defeated Al Leber who received 3,645 votes and Caitlin Collier who received 3,181 votes.
- 2022 Vasgaard was redistricted into the 16th district, and ran in the Republican primary, but was defeated by Kevin Jensen and Karla Lems. Lems had 1848 votes, Jensen had 1733 and Vasgaard had 1616.
- 2024 Vasgaard was elected to represent the 16th district alongside Lems.

2020 South Dakota House of Representatives District 17 General election
Party	Candidate	Votes	%
Republican	Sydney Davis	5,278	31.25%
Republican	Richard Vasgaard	4,786	28.34%
Democratic	Al Leber	3,645	21.58%
Democratic	Caitlin F. Collier	3,181	18.83%
Total votes		16,890	100.0%
Republican hold			
Republican hold			
