= Eldon Nygaard =

American politician

Member of the South Dakota Senate from the 17th district
- In office 2011–2013
- Preceded by: Ben Nesselhuf
- Succeeded by: Tom Jones

Personal details
- Born: April 17, 1946 (age 80) Viborg, South Dakota
- Party: Democratic (before 2010); Republican (since 2010)
- Education: University of Nebraska (BBA); Marquette University (JD)
- Profession: Attorney; Farmer

Eldon Eugene Nygaard is an American politician who served as a member of both houses of the South Dakota Legislature.

== Early life and career ==
Eldon Nygaard was born April 17, 1946, in Viborg, South Dakota and raised on a farm near that city. His wife, Sherry, is a member of the Choctaw Nation of Oklahoma. Nygaard saw service in the Vietnam War with the 11th Armored Cavalry Regiment. He retired as an Army Aviator with the rank of Chief Warrant Officer 4. He earned a bachelor of business administration from the University of Nebraska Omaha in 1972 and his Juris Doctor degree from Marquette University Law School in 1976. He taught political science at the University of South Dakota. In 1993, Eldon retired to the farm where he was raised near Viborg, South Dakota. Three years later, he established Valiant Vineyards, the first vineyard in South Dakota.

== Political career ==
In the 2006 general election, he was elected to represent the 17th district, which included Clay and Turner counties. During the 86th South Dakota Legislature, Nygaard served as a member of the Committee on Health and Human Services and the Committee on Commerce. During the 87th Legislature, Nygaard was elevated to serve as one of the Democratic Caucus' whips and continued his service on the Commerce and Health and Human Services committees.

In 2010, Democratic incumbent Ben Nesselhuf vacated his seat and ran for South Dakota Secretary of State. Nygaard defeated Republican candidate Terri Jorgenson for the seat. Shortly after his election to the state senate as a Democrat, Nygaard joined the Republican Party. In the Senate, he served as Vice Chair of the Commerce & Energy Committee and served as a member on the Commerce Committee, Judiciary Committee, and Taxation Committee. In the 2012 general election, Nygaard did not seek reelection. He was succeeded in the 17th district by Tom Jones.

== Post-political career ==
As of 2017, he is president of the South Dakota Wineries Association, a trade association for wineries.
