= Nancy Rasmussen =

American politician (born 1953)

Member of the South Dakota House of Representatives from the 17th district
- Incumbent
- Assumed office January 11, 2013 Serving with Ray Ring
- Preceded by: Jamie Boomgarden; Tom Jones
- Succeeded by: Richard Vasgaard (elect); Sydney Davis (elect)

Personal details
- Born: August 11, 1953 (age 72)
- Party: Republican

Nancy Opoien Rasmussen(born August 11, 1953) is an American politician and a Republican member of the South Dakota House of Representatives representing District 17 since January 11, 2013.

== Elections ==
in 2012, when District 17 incumbent Democratic Representative Tom Jones ran for South Dakota Senate and Republican Representative Jamie Boomgarden was term limited and retired, Rasmussen was unopposed for the June 5, 2012 Republican Primary; in the three-way November 6, 2012 General election Rasmussen took the first seat with 4,512 votes (35.4%) and Democratic nominee Ray Ring took the second seat ahead of fellow Democratic nominee Marion Sorlien.
