= Mark E. Rogen =

American politician (born 1956)

Member of the South Dakota Senate from the 9th district
- In office 1993–1996
- Preceded by: Roberta Rasmussen
- Succeeded by: Dennis Daugaard

Personal details
- Born: December 29, 1956 (age 69)
- Party: Democratic

Mark E. Rogen (born December 29, 1956) is an American politician.

Rogen served as a Democratic member of the South Dakota Senate from 1993 to 1996. He ran for the Minnehaha County Commission in 2010.
