= Jamie Boomgarden =

American politician

Member of the South Dakota House of Representatives from the 17th district
- In office January 11, 2005 – January 8, 2013
- Preceded by: Ben Nesselhuf
- Succeeded by: Nancy Rasmussen; Ray Ring

Personal details
- Born: July 9, 1968 (age 56); Sioux Falls, South Dakota
- Political party: Republican

Jamie Boomgarden (born July 9, 1968) is an American politician who served in the South Dakota House of Representatives from the 17th district from 2005 to 2013.
