= Tom Jones (South Dakota politician) =

American politician (born 1940)

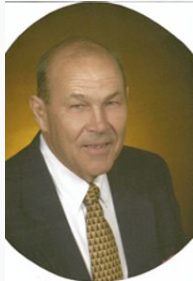

Member of the South Dakota Senate from the 17th district
- In office January 8, 2013 – January 13, 2015
- Preceded by: Eldon Nygaard
- Succeeded by: Arthur Rusch

Member of the South Dakota House of Representatives from the 17th district
- In office January 11, 2011 – January 8, 2013 Serving with Jamie Boomgarden
- Preceded by: Eldon Nygaard

Personal details
- Born: November 17, 1940 (age 85)
- Party: Democratic

Thomas Arthur Jones (born November 17, 1940) was an American politician and a Democratic member of the South Dakota Senate, who represented District 17 from January 8, 2013 to January 13, 2015. Jones served consecutively in the South Dakota Legislature from January 11, 2011 until January 8, 2013 in the South Dakota House of Representatives District 17 seat.

Jones announced in 2014 he would not seek re-election.

== Elections ==
In 2008, to challenge House District 17 incumbent Republican Representative Jamie Boomgarden, Jones ran in the four-way June 3, 2008 Democratic Primary but placed third behind incumbent Representative Eldon Nygaard and former state Senator John Reedy; in the four-way November 4, 2008 General election Republican Representative Boomgarden took the first seat and Representative Nygaard took the second seat ahead of Democratic former Senator Reedy and Republican nominee Roger Tigert, who had replaced John Lang on the ballot for the General election.

In 2010, when House District 17 incumbent Democratic Representative Nygaard ran for South Dakota Senate, Jones ran in the June 8, 2010 Democratic Primary; in the four-way November 2, 2010 General election incumbent Republican Representative Boomgarden took the first seat and Jones took the second seat with 3,575 votes (27.43%) ahead of Republican nominee Ron Nelson and fellow Democratic nominee Patricia Norin, who had run for the seat in 2006.

In 2012, when incumbent Senate District 17 Democratic Senator Eldon Nygaard left the Legislature and left the District 17 seat open, Jones was unopposed for the June 5, 2012 Democratic Primary and won the November 6, 2012 General election with 4,754 votes (52.4%) against Republican nominee John Chicoine.
