= Roberta Rasmussen =

American politician (born 1939)

Member of the South Dakota Senate from the 9th district
- In office 1991–1993
- Preceded by: Walter I. Bones
- Succeeded by: Mark E. Rogen

Member of the South Dakota Senate from the 17th district
- In office 1993–1996
- Preceded by: Roland A. Chicoine
- Succeeded by: John J. Reedy

Personal details
- Born: March 22, 1939 (age 87)
- Party: Democratic

Roberta A. Rasmussen (born March 22, 1939) is an American politician.

Rasmussen was a Democratic member of the South Dakota Senate from 1991 to 1996. In 2018, the South Dakota Pork Producers Council awarded her the Dedicated and Distinguished Service Award. Rasmussen is the 2023 recipient of the South Dakota Democratic Party's Goldie Wells Award. Rasmussen has volunteered with the Daneville Heritage Museum in Viborg.
