= Sydney Davis (South Dakota politician) =

American politician

Member of the South Dakota House of Representatives from the 17th district
- Incumbent
- Assumed office January 12, 2021 Serving with Richard Vasgaard
- Preceded by: Ray Ring; Nancy Rasmussen

Personal details
- Party: Republican
- Children: 1
- Education: South Dakota State University (BSN); Mount Marty College (MSN)

Sydney Davis is a cattle producer and Certified Registered Nurse Anesthetist CRNA, as well as a member of the South Dakota Senate. She also served in the South Dakota House of Representatives from the 17th district. Elected in November 2020, she assumed office on January 12, 2021.

== Education ==
Davis earned a Bachelor of Science in Nursing from South Dakota State University and a Master of Science from Mount Marty College.

== Career ==
Davis has worked as a nurse, nurse anesthetist, and cattle producer. Davis was elected to the South Dakota House of Representatives in November 2020 and assumed office on January 12, 2021, succeeding Ray Ring. On January 4, 2022 she announced her candidacy for the District 17 State Senate seat which she won and is currently serving a 2 year term as State Senator.

== Election history ==
2020 South Dakota House of Representatives District 17 General election
Party	Candidate	Votes	%
Republican	Sydney Davis	5,278	31.25%
Republican	Richard Vasgaard	4,786	28.34%
Democratic	Al Leber	3,645	21.58%
Democratic	Caitlin F. Collier	3,181	18.83%
Total votes		16,890	100.0%
Republican hold			
Republican hold			
