= Ray Ring (politician) =

American politician (born 1945)

Member of the South Dakota House of Representatives from the 17th district
- In office January 11, 2013 – January 12, 2021
- Preceded by: Tom Jones
- Succeeded by: Sydney Davis

Personal details
- Born: Raymond J. Ring Jr. May 22, 1945 (age 81) Marshall County, South Dakota, U.S.
- Party: Democratic

Raymond J. Ring Jr. (born May 22, 1945) was an American politician who served as a Democratic member of the South Dakota House of Representatives from January 11, 2013 to January 12, 2021.

== Elections ==
In 2012, when District 17 incumbent Democratic Representative Tom Jones ran for South Dakota Senate and Republican Representative Jamie Boomgarden was term limited and retired, Ring ran in the June 5, 2012 Democratic Primary; in the three-way November 6, 2012 General election Republican nominee Nancy Rasmussen took the first seat and Ring took the second seat with 4,212 votes (33.0%) ahead of fellow Democratic nominee Marion Sorlien.

In 2014, incumbent Ray Ring ran for reelection to the South Dakota House of Representatives in a four way race. Ring took the first seat with 3283 votes while incumbent Republican Nancy Rasmussen took the second set with 3279. Democrat Marion Sorlien was third with 2784.

In 2016, incumbent Ray Ring ran in a four way race. Incumbent Republican Nancy Rasmussen took the first seat with 4668 votes while Ring won the second set with 4183. Republican Debbie Pease was third with 3736 and Democrat Mark Winegar was fourth with 3357.

In 2018, in his final term Ring once again ran in a four way race and took the second seat with 4352 votes. Republican Nancy Rasmussen took the first seat with 4374. Democrat John Gors was third with 3607 and Libertarian Gregory Baldwin was fourth with 829 votes.

Republicans won the seat following his retirement.
