= 11th Armored Cavalry Regiment =

- 11th Armored Cavalry Shoulder sleeve insignia
- Founded: 1901
- Country: United States
- Branch: United States Army
- Type: Armored cavalry
- Size: 3 squadrons
- Part of: National Training Center OPFOR
- Garrison/HQ: Fort Irwin National Training Center
- Nickname: "Blackhorse Regiment" (special designation)
- Motto: Allons (Let's Go)
- March: Allons! Allons! (Let's Go! Let's Go!)
- Engagements: Philippine–American War; Pancho Villa Expedition; World War II; Vietnam War; Gulf War; War in Afghanistan; Iraq War

Commanders
- Current commander: Colonel Brennan Speakes
- Current senior enlisted advisor: Command Sergeant-Major David L. Shipman
- Notable commanders: John N. Abrams; Joseph A. Baer; Andrew Bacevich; John B. Poindexter; Frederick M. Franks Jr. George Patton IV; Crosbie E. Saint; Donn A. Starry; Earl Dennison Thomas; Thomas E. White

Insignia
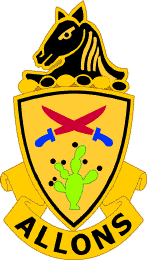
- Regimental distinctive insignia

- Combat Service Identification Badge

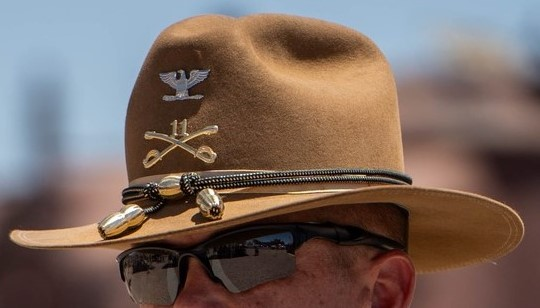
- 1901 brown campaign hat/stetson, worn by 11th ACR soldiers

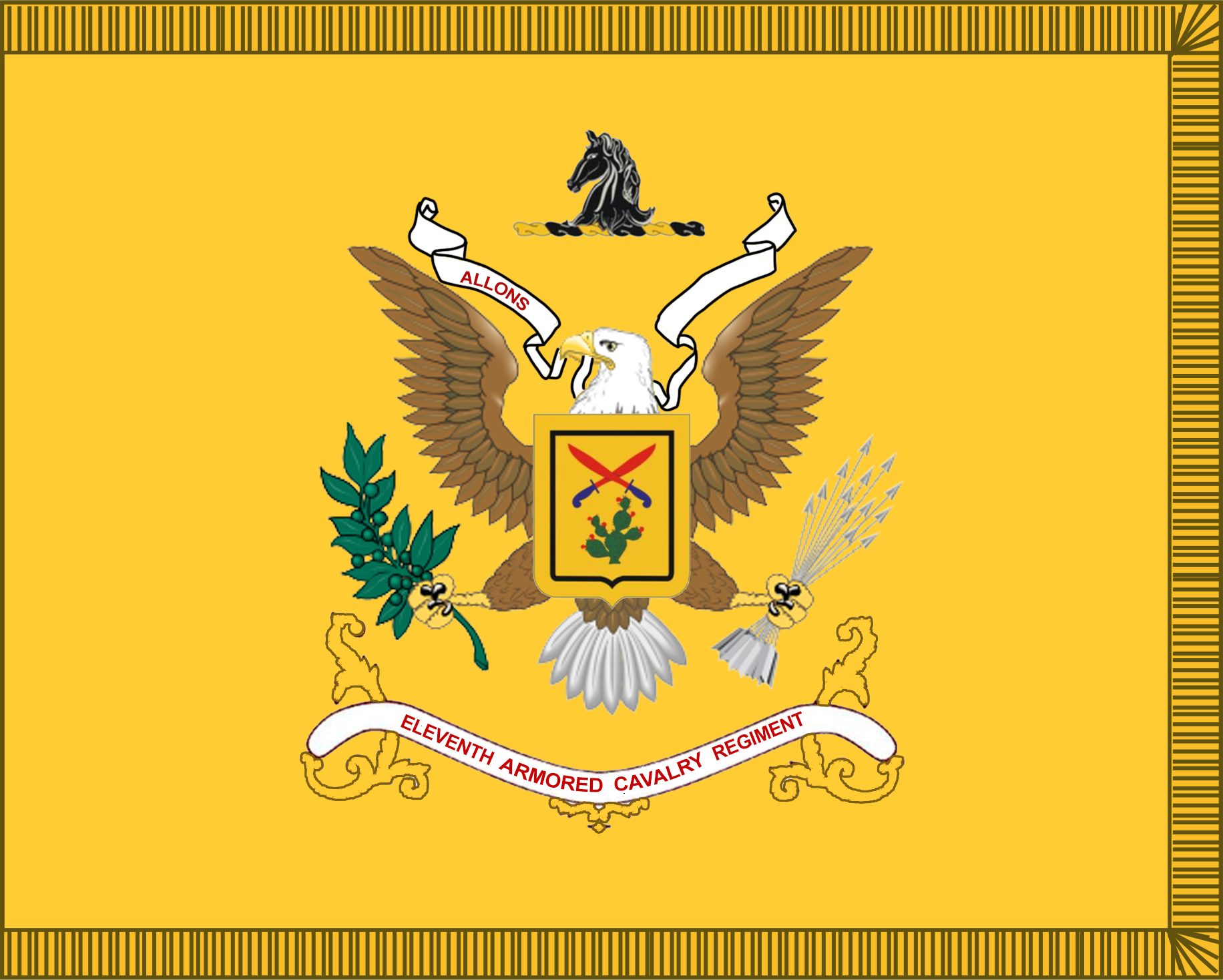
- 11th Armored Cavalry Regiment Flag

The 11th Armored Cavalry Regiment ("Blackhorse Regiment") is a unit of the United States Army garrisoned at the Fort Irwin National Training Center in California. The regiment has served in the Philippine–American War, the Pancho Villa Expedition, World War II, the Vietnam War, Gulf War and Iraq War. The 11th ACR serves as the opposing force (OPFOR) for the Army and Marine task forces, and foreign military forces that train at Fort Irwin.

The OPFOR trained U.S. Army forces in mechanized desert warfare following a Soviet-era style threat until June 2002, when the OPFOR and the 11th Armored Cavalry Regiment changed to portraying an urban/asymmetrical warfare style of combat U.S. soldiers are facing in operations abroad. From June to December 2003, members of the 11th ACR deployed to Afghanistan, where they helped to develop and train the armor and mechanized infantry battalions of the Afghan National Army. These specialized units would defend the Afghan capital during the country's constitutional convention. In January 2005, the 11th ACR deployed to Iraq. The 11th ACR was not reorganized under the U.S. Army Combat Arms Regimental System (CARS), though it has been reorganized under CARS' replacement, the U.S. Army Regimental System.

== History ==
=== 11th Cavalry Regiment ===
The regiment was constituted on 2 February 1901 in the Regular Army as the 11th Cavalry Regiment, and was organized on 11 March 1901 at Fort Myer, Virginia. The regiment participated in the 1916 Pancho Villa Expedition under the command of William Jones Nicholson.

In 1919, the regiment was stationed at the Presidio of Monterey, California. On 15 July 1927, the regiment was assigned to the 3rd Cavalry Division. It was relieved from the 3rd Cavalry Division on 1 May 1932 and assigned to the 2nd Cavalry Division. In April 1933, the regiment assumed command and control of the Monterey Civilian Conservation Corps District until mid-1934 and supported the construction and supervision of CCC camps in northern California from 1933 to 1939. It maintained habitual summer training relationships with the Organized Reserve 162nd Cavalry Brigade, 323rd Cavalry Regiment, and 162nd Machine Gun Squadron. The regiment moved to Fort Ord in stages from 16 to 27 January 1940 and again to Camp Clayton on 15 April to 15 May 1940 for temporary training. They participated in maneuvers at Fort Lewis in Washington from 4 to 29 August 1940, and returned to the Presidio of Monterey on 31 August 1940, where they were relieved from assignment to the 2nd Cavalry Division. They next moved to Camp Seeley in California on 7 November 1941, and again to Live Oaks, California, on 24 July 1941; they then returned to Camp Seeley on 17 September 1941, and to Camp Lockett on 10 December 1941.

They were next assigned to the Armored Force on 12 June 1942, and relocated to Fort Benning, Georgia on 10 July 1942, where they prepared to be inactivated and reorganized. The 11th Cavalry Regiment was inactivated on 15 July 1942 at Fort Benning, with personnel and equipment concurrently transferred to the 11th Armored Regiment, with concurrent development of the 11th Cavalry Group, and the 11th Tank Group. The remainder of the 11th Cavalry was disbanded on 26 October 1944.

==== 11th Armored Regiment ====
The 11th Armored Regiment was constituted on 11 July 1942 in the Army of the United States, assigned to the 10th Armored Division (AD), and organized at Fort Benning on 15 July 1942 from the personnel and equipment of the 11th Cavalry Regiment. The motto on the unit insignia is "Allons", which means "Let's Go" in French.

The regiment moved to Murfreesboro, Tennessee, on 22 June 1943, and then Fort Gordon on 5 September 1943. 11th Armored Regiment was broken up on 20 September 1943, and its elements were distributed as follows:

- Headquarters and Headquarters Company (HHC), 11th Armored Regiment, and 1st and 2nd Battalions were reorganized as the 11th Tank Battalion in the 10th AD.
- 3rd Battalion, 11th Armored Regiment was reorganized and redesignated as the 712th Tank Battalion, and relieved from assignment to the 10th AD. The 712th Tank Battalion was inactivated at Camp Kilmer in New Jersey, on 27 October 1945, and redesignated the 525th Medium Tank Battalion on 1 September 1948. It was activated on 10 September 1948 at Fort Lewis, Washington. The 525th Medium Tank Battalion was redesignated as the 95th Tank Battalion on 4 February 1950, assigned to 7th Armored Division, and activated at Camp Roberts in California on 24 November 1950, and inactivated there on 15 November 1953.
- Reconnaissance Company was reorganized and redesignated as Troop E, 90th Cavalry Reconnaissance Squadron, which maintained a separate history thereafter.
- Maintenance and Service Companies were disbanded.

The 11th Tank Group, later 11th Armoured Group, whose HHT was constituted on 19 July 1943 in the National Army, was a completely separate organization from the 11th Armoured Regiment / 11th Cavalry, a tank group/armoured group headquarters, not a regiment.

=== 11th Tank Battalion ===
As part of the 10th Armored Division, the 11th Tank Battalion shipped out from the New York Port of Embarkation on 13 September 1944, and landed in France on 23 September 1944. The battalion participated in the Rhineland, Ardennes-Alsace, and Central Europe Campaigns, and was located at Schongau, Bavaria, Germany on 14 August 1945. The battalion returned to the Hampton Roads Port of Embarkation on 13 October 1945, was inactivated at Camp Patrick Henry in Virginia on the same day.

=== 11th Cavalry Group (Mechanized) ===
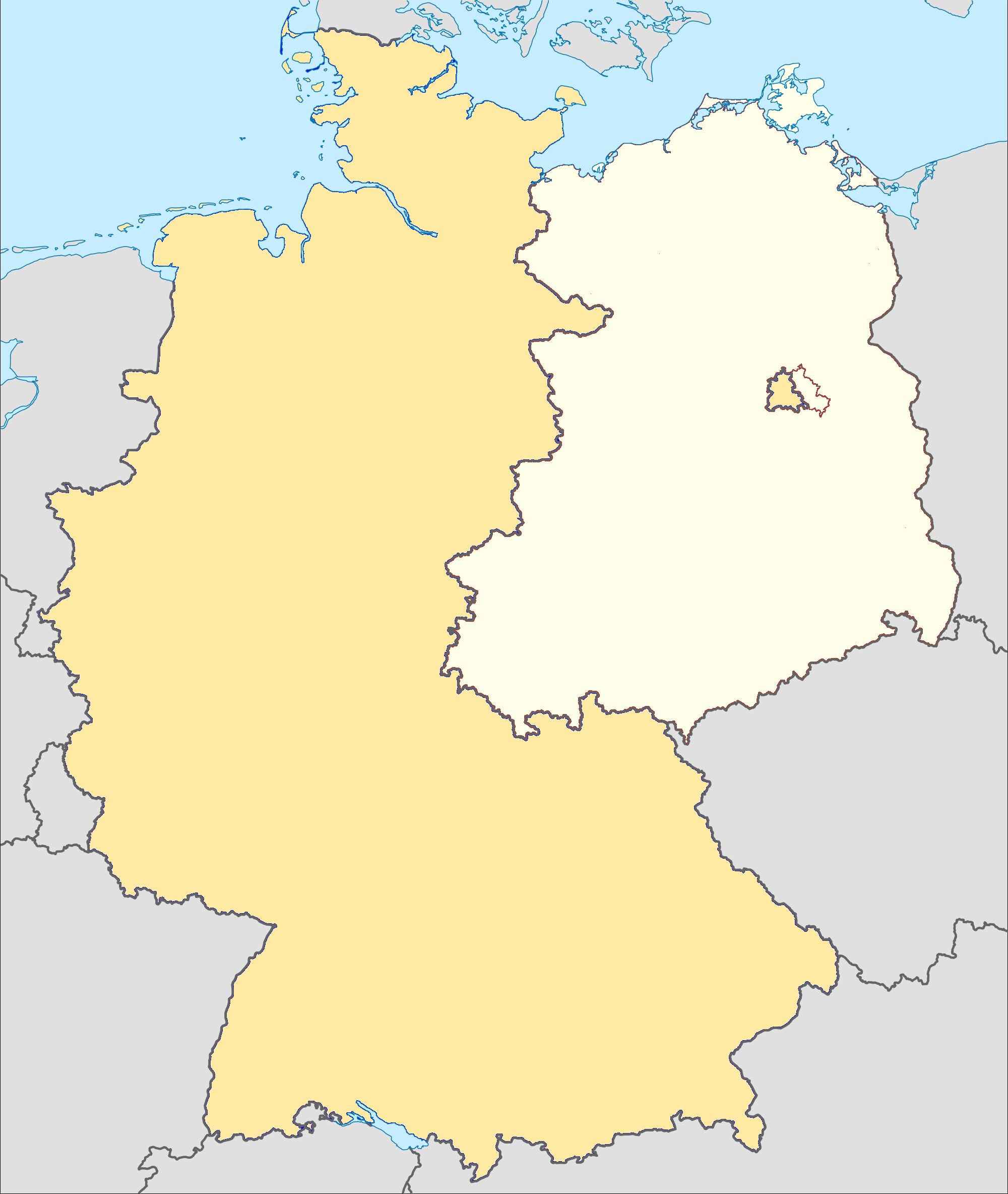
11th Cavalry (and related units) locations
in Germany in the 20th Century

Headquarters & Headquarters Troop (HHT), 11th Cavalry Regiment was redesignated on 19 April 1943 as HHT, 11th Cavalry Group, and was activated at Camp Anza in California on 5 May 1943. At that time, the 36th Cavalry Reconnaissance Squadron and 44th Cavalry Reconnaissance Squadron were attached. The group was then moved to Fort Bragg on 31 January 1944, and again to Atlantic Beach, Florida, on 15 March 1944 for amphibious training. They then moved to Camp Gordon on 1 June 1944 and then departed the New York Port of Embarkation on 29 September 1944, and arrived in England on 10 October 1944, and landed in France on 26 November 1944. They moved to the Netherlands on 8 December 1944, went into the line in Germany on 12 December 1944, and protected the Roer River sector; they recrossed into the Netherlands on 3 February 1945, and re-entered Germany on 27 February 1945 on the left flank of the U.S. 84th Infantry Division. The group then held a defensive line along the Rhine River near Düsseldorf on 12 March 1945 under the XIII Corps, and crossed the Rhine at Wesel on 1 April 1945, screened XIII Corps' northern flank, and saw action during the Battle of Munster and the seizure of the Ricklingen Bridge over the Leine River. During the campaign in northwestern Europe, Troop B of the 44th Cavalry Reconnaissance Squadron served as a mechanized escort and security force for the headquarters of General Dwight D. Eisenhower, supreme commander of the Allied Expeditionary Forces. In August 1945, 11th Cavalry Group headquarters was located at Gross Ilsede, Germany.

HHT, 11th Cavalry Group was converted and reorganized as HHT, 11th Constabulary Regiment on 1 May 1946. During this period, the regimental headquarters was located in Regensburg. As a constabulary unit, the 11th Constabulary Regiment patrolled occupied Germany and performed law enforcement and keeping of the public order missions. HHT 11th Constabulary Regiment was further reorganized and redesignated as HHC, 11th Armored Cavalry Regiment on 30 November 1948.

=== 11th Armored Cavalry Regiment ===
Reassembly and organizing of 11th ACR was completed on 30 November 1948 by reconstitution and reorganization of elements of the 11th Cavalry Regiment and HHT, 1st Constabulary Regiment. HHT-1st Constabulary Regiment was converted, redesignated and consolidated into 11th ACR as HHT, 3rd Battalion, 11th ACR on 30 November 1948. 11th Tank Battalion was consolidated into 11th ACR on 8 January 1951. 95th Tank Battalion was consolidated into 3rd Battalion, 11th ACR on 1 October 1958. Air Troop inactivated 20 March 1972 in Vietnam; 2d Squadron inactivated 6 April 1972 in Vietnam; Air Troop and 2d Squadron activated 17 May 1972 in Germany. Around 1984, Air Troop was enlarged and became the 4th Squadron (Thunderhorse), also known as the Combat Aviation Squadron.

Placed 17 June 1986 under the United States Army Regimental System

Inactivated 15 October 1993 – 15 March 1994 in Germany

Activated 16 October 1994 (less 3d and 4th Squadrons; the Air Defense Artillery Battery; and the Howitzer Batteries, 1st and 2d Squadrons) at Fort Irwin, California

== West Germany (1957–64) ==
As part of the Gyroscope unit rotations, the 11th ACR was sent to West Germany in March 1957 for another round at the border surveillance mission along the Iron Curtain, replacing the 6th Armored Cavalry Regiment. Regimental headquarters and 1st Squadron were located in Straubing while the 2nd Squadron was stationed in Landshut and the 3rd Squadron in Regensburg. The regiment's border surveillance mission was along the German-Czech frontier. In 1964, the 11th ACR returned to the United States and would be bound for Vietnam within two years.

== South Vietnam (1966–72) ==
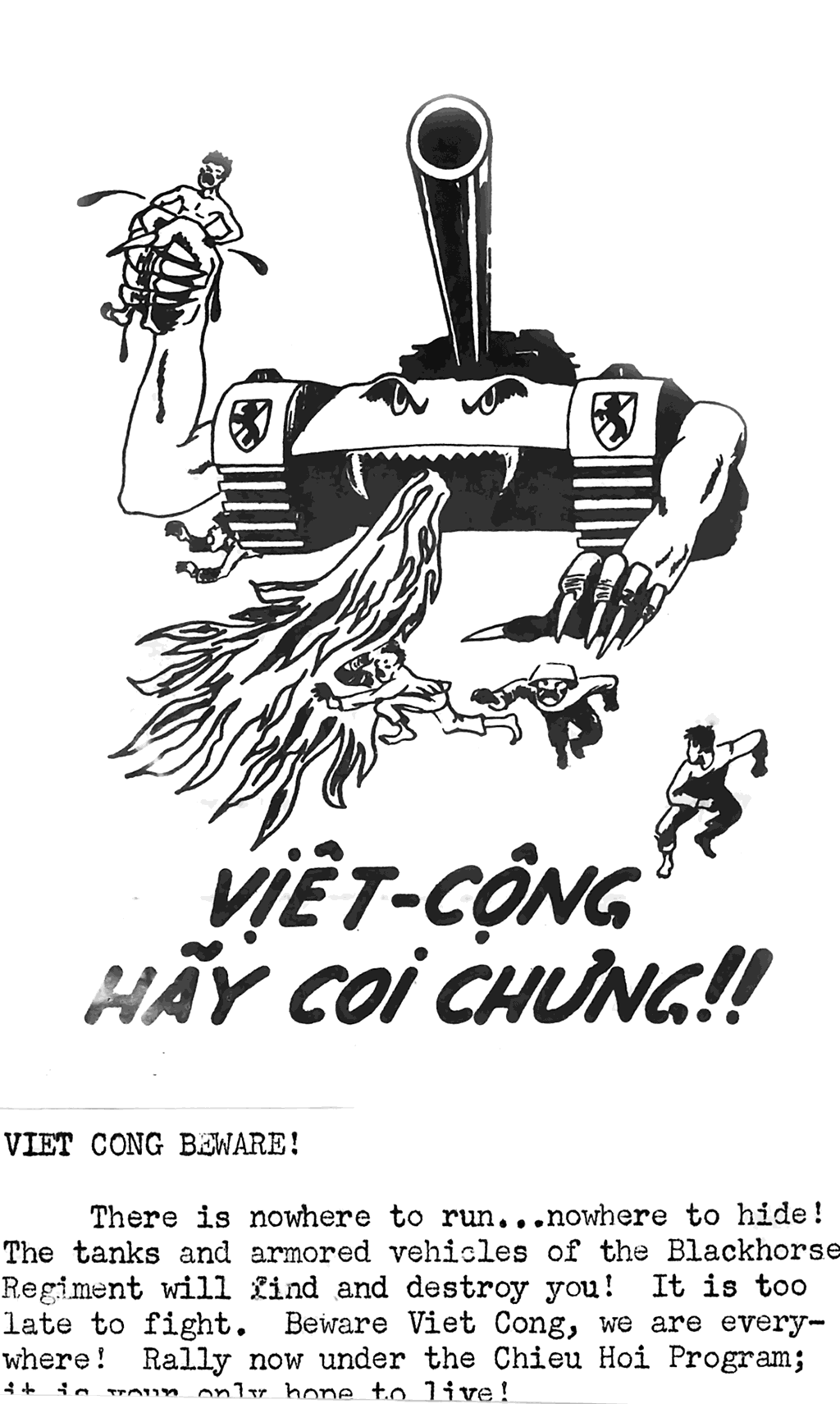
Propaganda leaflets depicting a Blackhorse tank urging the defection of Viet Cong and North Vietnamese to the side of the South

Home now for the regiment was Fort Meade, where the "Blackhorse" engaged in operational training and support activities like participation in the Presidential Inauguration and support for ROTC summer training.

With the war in South Vietnam escalating, the Blackhorse Regiment was alerted for assignment to Southeast Asia on 11 March 1966. The regiment began specialized training for combat in a counterinsurgency environment. Modifications were made to the organization and equipment (MTOE) with emphasis on the use of modified M113 armored personnel carriers (APCs). Two M-60 machineguns with protective gun shields were mounted at the port and starboard rear of the vehicle, and a combination circular & flat frontal gun shield(s) were added around the .50 caliber machine gun located at the commander's hatch. This combination produced a M-113 Armored Cavalry Assault Vehicle, or, in Vietnam more simply referred to as an ACAV by GIs, a name coined by 11th Armored Cavalrymen.

The regiment's modifications emphasized the use of ACAVs instead of the Patton medium tank and completely replaced the M-114 found in reconnaissance platoons, which may have existed in European and CONUS areas of operation. The M114 had been deployed to Vietnam in 1962, but withdrawn in 1964 due to its unsatisfactory, and often disastrous performance. Throughout the war, the tank companies, with their M48 Patton tanks, remained the same in each squadron. In 1968, Colonel George S. Patton IV (son of World War II General Patton), commander of the 11th ACR in South Vietnam recommended to General Creighton Abrams that one squadron from a division and the other from theater command be issued the army's new aluminum tanks (Sheridans) for combat testing. General Abrams concurred, and in January 1969, M551 Sheridans were issued to the 3rd Squadron 4th Armored Cavalry and the 1st Squadron 11th Armored Cavalry. Due to differences between the organization of regimental cavalry squadrons and divisional cavalry squadrons, in 1st Sqdn 11th ACR, the Sheridans were issued to the ACAV troops, replacing three M113 ACAVs in each platoon (the squadron's one tank company remained intact); in 3rd Squadron, 4th Cavalry, the Sheridans replaced M48A3 tanks throughout.

Although the 3/4 Cavalry met near disaster with their Sheridans within a month of receiving them (one destroyed by a mine), the 1/11 Cavalry had just the reverse in luck, killing nearly 80 enemy soldiers during an engagement on 23 February 1969. All things considered, the army was satisfied with the Sheridan tank, and by the end of 1970 alone, well over 200 M551s would be in South Vietnam. While nearly all US armored cavalry squadrons were equipped with the M551 by 1970, the 11th ACR tank companies, as well as the three US Army armor battalions (1/69th, 2/34th, and 1/77th Armor) in country, all retained their 90mm gun M48A3 Patton tanks. Only the M48s, as well as the Australian Centurions, and ARVN M41 Walker Bulldog light tanks could effectively and safely conduct "thunder runs"; the firing of all tank weapons while driving down the highway or road. While ACAVs did not have a cannon, the Sheridan's high recoil from its 152mm main gun negated it from firing excessive broadsides while moving down a road. Thus the most favored tanks for clearing highways with "thunder runs" on a daily basis, most often fell to the M48s of the 11th ACR and accompanying armor units.

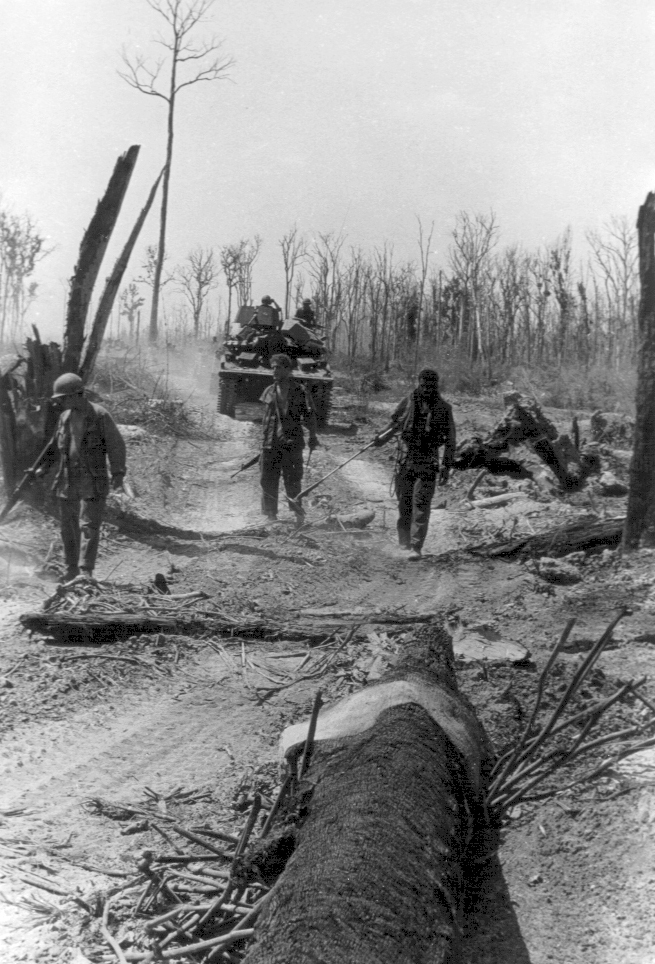
Engineers supported by a M551 Sheridan Tank from the Blackhorse Regiment clear mines in Cambodia.

=== Arrival in country ===
The Blackhorse Regiment arrived in Vũng Tàu, South Vietnam on 7 September 1966 and was commanded by Col. William W. Cobb. Operation Hickory (7–15 October 1966) produced the first enemy casualties inflicted by the 3rd Squadron and elements of the 919th Engineer Company in the vicinity of Phu Hoa.

=== Blackhorse Base Camp ===
Operation Atlanta was the code name for the establishment of Blackhorse Base Camp—the new home of the 11th Armored Cavalry Regiment in Vietnam. Blackhorse Base Camp was located approximately 6 kilometres (3.7 mi) south of the village of Xuan Loc on Route 2 and approximately 2 kilometres (1.2 mi) southeast of the village of Long Goia. Saigon is approximately 35 kilometres (22 mi) to the west along Rt. 1. The operation began on 20 October and concluded on 3 November 1966.

Stanton's Vietnam Order Of Battle lists the following locations for the 11th Armored Cavalry Regiment's headquarters in Vietnam:

- Bien Hoa September 1966 – November 1966
- Long Binh December 1966 – February 1967
- Blackhorse Base Camp/Xuan Loc March 1967 – January 1969
- Lai Khê February 1969
- Long Giao March 1969 – September 1969
- Bien Hoa October 1969 – June 1970
- Di An July 1970 – March 1971

=== Operation Cedar Falls ===
From January until 18 May 1967, the regiment conducted three major search and destroy operations. These operations would later be known as reconnaissance in force (RIF) operations. The first of these operations commence on 8 January 1967 and was known as "Operation Cedar Falls". It continued until 24 January 1967. The 1st and 2nd Squadrons operated in the infamous "Iron Triangle" region near Ben Cat employing search and destroy tactics, screening and blocking, and security in attacks on successive objectives.

=== Operation Junction City ===
Operation Junction City I and II involved the 1st and 3rd Squadrons. It began on 18 February 1967 and ran through 15 April 1967. This operation took these squadrons to the headquarters of the Central Office South Vietnam (COSVN) believed to be located in Bình Dương Province with the objective of destroying this important headquarters. This joint mission conducted with the 1st Australian Task Force secured lines of communication and fire support bases (FSB). Extensive RIF operations were conducted as well.

=== Operation Manhattan ===
Commencing on 23 April 1967 the third operation titled Operation Manhattan was a thrust into the Long Nguyen Secret Zone by the 1st and 2nd Squadrons. This zone was a long-suspected regional headquarters of the Viet Cong. In a series of reconnaissance in force operations 60 tunnel complexes were uncovered. 1884 fortifications were destroyed. 621 tons of rice was evacuated during these operations. Operation Manhattan ended on 11 May 1967.

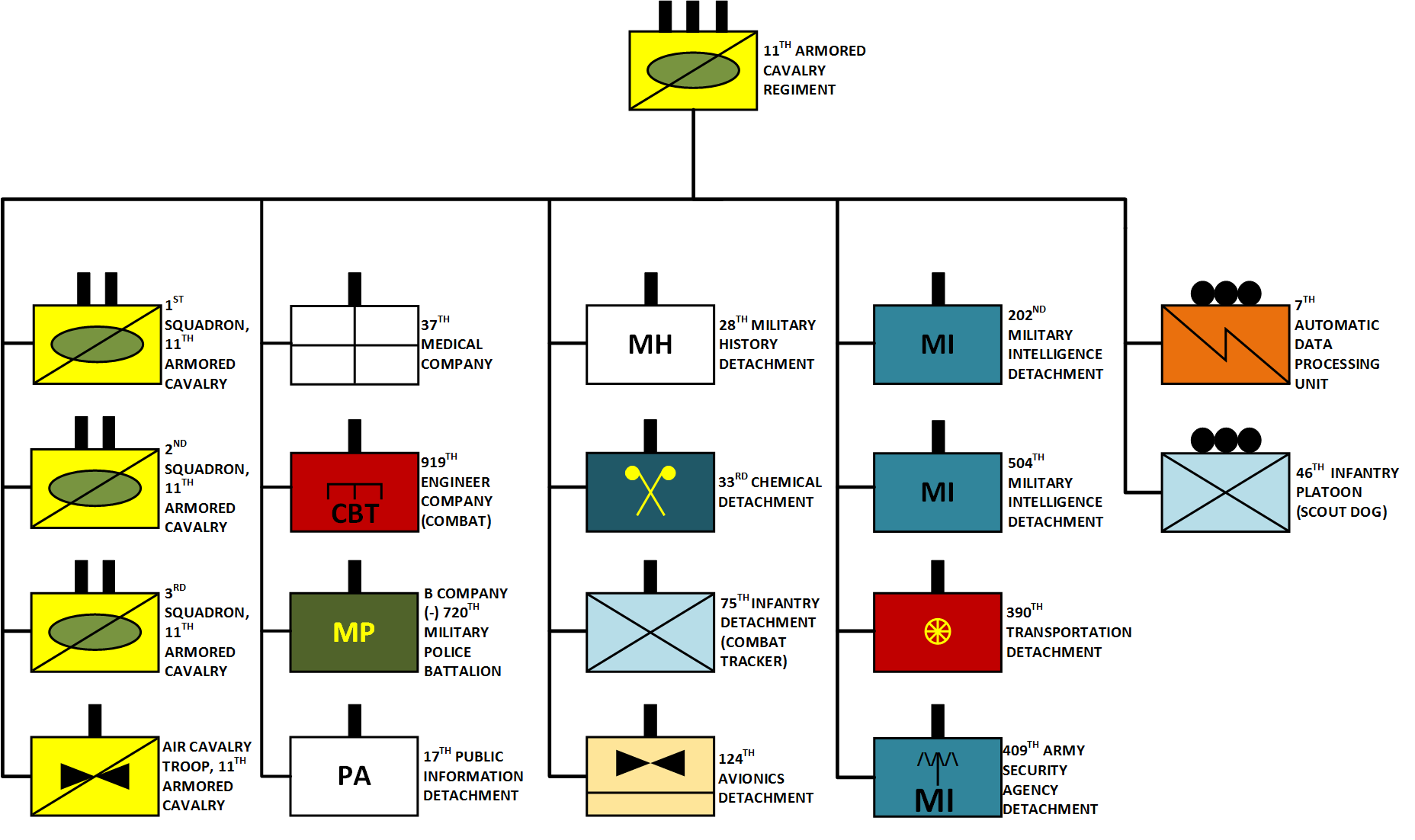
Order of battle graphic showing the US 11th Armored Cavalry Regiment in the Vietnam War

=== Operation Kittyhawk ===
Beginning in April 1967 and running through 21 March 1968, the regiment was tasked to secure and pacify Long Khánh District. This year-long mission was called Operation Kittyhawk. It achieved three objectives: Viet Cong (VC) were kept from interfering with travel on the main roads, Vietnamese were provided medical treatment in civic action programs like MEDCAP and DENTCAP and finally, RIF operations were employed to keep the VC off balance, making it impossible for them to mount offensive operations.

=== 1967 ===
From the summer of 1967 until the winter the regiment was led by Col. Roy W. Farley. Operation Emporia I & II was a road clearing operation with limited RIF missions by the 1st and 3rd Squadrons in Long Khánh District. Operation Valdosta I & II was a regimental size operation. Its purpose was to provide security at polling places during elections and to maintain reaction forces to counter VC agitation. As a result of the operation 84.7% of eligible voters cast ballots in Long Khánh District in the first general election and 78% in the second.

=== Operation Quicksilver ===
Operation Quicksilver involved the 1st and 2nd Squadrons of the 11th Armored Cavalry. Its purpose was to secure routes that moved logistical personnel of the 101st Airborne Division between Binh Long and Tây Ninh Provinces. Cordon, search and RIF missions were also performed.

=== Operation Fargo ===
Operation Fargo ran from 21 December 1967 until 21 January 1968. This regimental size operation conducted RIFs in Binh Long and Tây Ninh Provinces and opened Route 13 to military traffic for the very first time.

=== The Tet Offensive ===
The early part of 1968 was marked by the most ambitious and embolden offensive attack coordinated by the VC and NVA in the history of the war. The Tet Offensive was designed to coincide with the Vietnamese New Year.

=== Operation Adairsville ===
Operation Adairsville began on 31 January 1968. Word was received by the II Field Force HQs to immediately re-deploy to the Long Binh/Bien Hoa area to relieve installations threatened by the Tet Offensive. At 1400 hours (2:00 pm) the 1st Squadron was called to move from their position south of the Michelin Rubber Plantation to the II Field Force headquarters. The 2nd Squadron moved from north of the plantation to III Corps POW Compound where enemy soldiers were sure to attempt to liberate the camp. The 3rd Squadron moved from An Lộc to III Corps Army, Republic of Vietnam (ARVN) headquarters. It took only 14 hours and 80 miles to arrive in position after first being alerted.

=== Operation Alcorn Cove ===
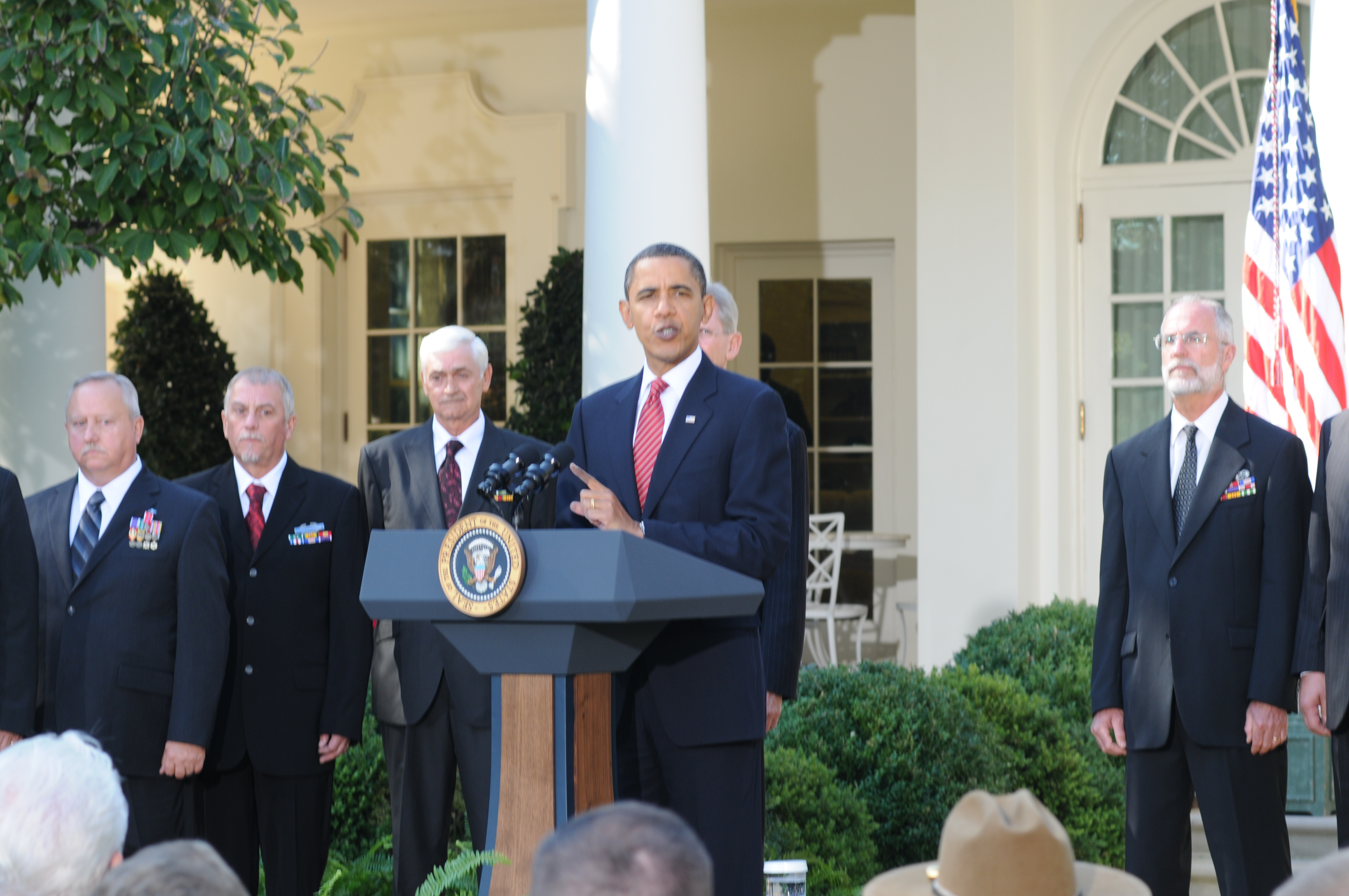
A Troop veterans are honored for their heroism in Vietnam, October 2009.

The security operation in the Long Binh/Bien Hoa area and the area around Blackhorse Base Camp by the 1st and 2nd Squadrons is continue under Operation Alcorn Cove which began on 22 March 1968. This combined mission with the ARVN 18th Division and 25th Division was a twofold operation of security and RIFs. Operation Toan Thang was an extension of "Alcorn Cove". That combined operation involved the 1st and 25th Infantry Divisions.

From April 1968 to January 1969, the 11th Cavalry was commanded Colonel (later Major General) George S. Patton IV, the son of General George S. Patton Jr.

=== "Workhorse" The 3rd Squadron ===
K Troop was part of the 3rd Squadron and known as "Killing K Troop". 3rd Squadron's nickname was "Workhorse". Shortly after its arrival in Vietnam, the 3rd Squadron engaged the Viet Cong for the first time. The squadron was awarded a Meritorious Unit Citation for this period.

The Tet Offensive of 1968 gave the squadron a chance to fight the enemy's troop formations in open combat. In Bien Hoa the 3rd Squadron drove the enemy forces from the area near III Corps headquarters. Its action was crucial in smashing the enemy's offensive.

On 20 October 2009 President Barack Obama presented a Presidential Unit Citation to troop commander Captain John B. Poindexter and all veterans of A Troop, 1st Squadron, 11th Cavalry for their heroism along the Cambodian border on 26 March 1970.

Brigadier General John Bahnsen, a recipient of the Distinguished Service Cross, served with the 11th ACR in Vietnam, commanding first the regiment's Air Cavalry Troop, and later its 1st Squadron.

== Return to West Germany, Fulda Gap ==
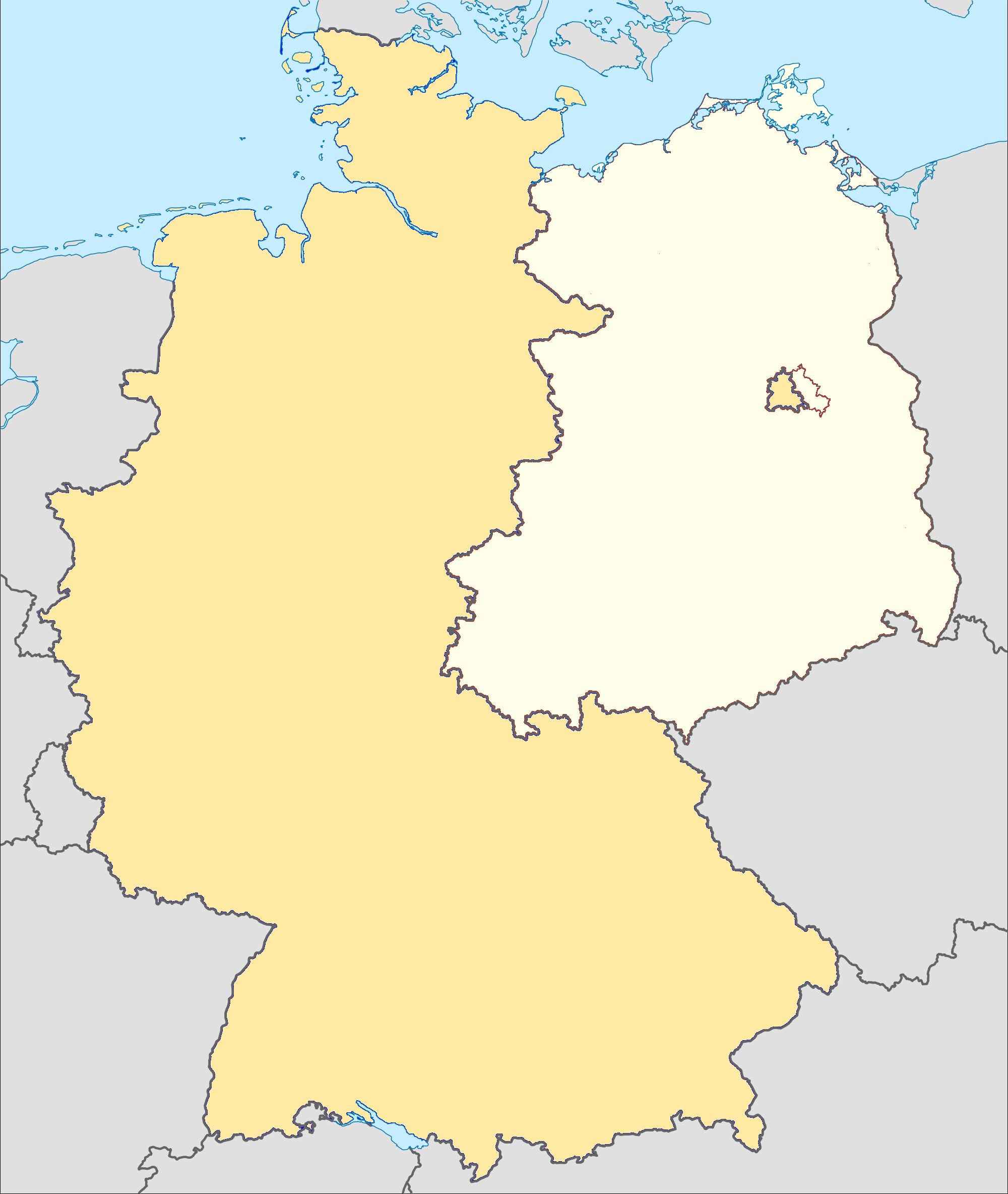
Fulda Gap deployments ca. 1985
RHQ – Regt Hq, 1/11 – 1st Squadron / 11th ACR, CAS – aviation, CSS – support
Soviet units are 8th Guards Army, U.S. units are V Corps
G – Guards, MR – Motor Rifle, T – Tank, D – Division

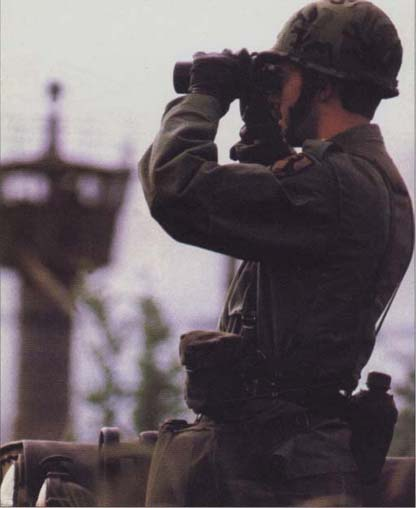
11th ACR trooper on duty in the Fulda Gap “OP ALPHA” during the Cold War.

The 11th Cavalry Group Mechanized was redesignated as the 11th Constabulary Regiment on 3 May 1946 in order that the regiment could fulfill its occupation duties, and was restored as the 11th Armored Cavalry Regiment and inactivated in November 1948. Blackhorse was brought back into active status 1 April 1951 at Camp Carson, Colorado. In 1954, the regiment transferred to Fort Knox to complete its training in armored tactics.

The Blackhorse Regiment rotated to southern Germany in May 1957, relieving the 6th ACR, and assumed the mission of patrolling the German-Czechoslovak border until its return to the United States in 1964.

The Blackhorse arrived in Vietnam on 7 September 1966. Second Squadron spearheaded Operation Fish Hook into Cambodia on 1 May 1970, surrounding a North Vietnamese logistics center.

During the drawdown of U.S. forces in Vietnam in early 1972, the 11th ACR was inactivated in stages (Air Troop inactivated 20 March 1972 in Vietnam; 2d Squadron inactivated 6 April 1972 in Vietnam) and subsequently reactivated in Germany (Air Troop and 2d Squadron activated 17 May 1972 in Germany) by reflagging the 14th Armored Cavalry Regiment. The regiment’s headquarters and the stationing of the 1st Squadron (nickname “Ironhorse”) were located in Fulda in eastern Hesse at Downs Barracks. The 2nd Squadron (nickname “Eaglehorse”) was stationed at Daley Barracks in Bad Kissingen, Bavaria, while the 3rd Squadron (nickname “Workhorse”) was based at McPheeters Barracks in Bad Hersfeld, eastern Hesse.

Fulda Army Airfield, near the Fulda district of Sickles, served as the base for the 4th Squadron (nickname “Thunderhorse”). In 1985, the Combat Support Squadron (nickname “Packhorse”) was additionally activated in Fulda.

Along the border, the 11th Armored Cavalry Regiment operated several Observation Posts (OPs). The 1st Squadron operated Observation Post Alpha near Rasdorf; the 2nd Squadron operated Camp Lee near Wollbach as well as Observation Post Tennessee (originally Observation Post Sierra) near the Eußenhausen/Meiningen border crossing; the 3rd Squadron operated Observation Post Romeo near Wildeck-Bosserode and Observation Point India near Ringgau-Lüderbach.

In the late 1980s, the 4th Squadron in Fulda operated the first air assault school of U.S. forces in Europe, known as the Blackhorse Air Assault School.

After the Soviet Union dissolved in December 1991 the regiment ended its seventeen-year station along the Iron Curtain.

The Blackhorse Regiment deployed an aviation task force on 10 April 1991 to Turkey for Operation Provide Comfort, an operation to support the Kurdish relief effort. One month later, the three maneuver squadrons (1st, 2d and 3d) along with the regiment's support squadron, deployed to Kuwait for Operation Positive Force, an operation to secure Kuwait so it could rebuild from the war. By October, the regiment had completed its missions in Turkey and Kuwait and returned to Fulda. As the need for US forces in Europe decreased, the Blackhorse Regiment was inactivated in a ceremony on 15 October 1993, and the remaining troops departed Germany in March 1994.

=== Training the force ===
Reactivated again on 16 October 1994, the 11th Armored Cavalry Regiment now serves as the Army's Opposing Force at the National Training Center. The regiment portrays a determined opposing force that trains US forces in the basic principles of army operations and challenges all the battlefield operating systems. As the 2nd Brigade Tactical Group, the squadron trains brigade and battalion task forces during ten rotations a year at the National Training Center.

== Current organization ==
=== 1st Squadron ===
First Squadron, 11th Armored Cavalry, "Ironhorse", was activated as a horse squadron at Fort Myer in 1901. It has served in the Philippines, Mexico, Europe, and Vietnam. It is now organized as a combined arms battalion, and comprises one of the two maneuver elements of the 11th ACR. It is organized around a Headquarters and Headquarters Troop (HHT), and four line troops (two infantry, two armor), with a total authorized strength of 720 soldiers. It is equipped with the OPFOR Surrogate Vehicle, an M901 ITV highly modified with an M2/M3 Bradley Fighting Vehicle turret to represent the BMP-2 armored personnel carrier, and the OSTV (OPFOR Surrogate Tank Vehicle) a vehicle based on the OPFOR Surrogate Vehicle which can simulate a wide spectrum of threat tanks. Using this equipment and configuration, the squadron performs the first of its two primary missions, acting as a non-permissive opposing force (OPFOR) during ten FORSCOM combat training rotations each year. The squadron's second mission is to deploy and fight as a combined arms battalion for various contingency operations throughout the world. In order to support this mission, the squadron must also maintain, operate and remain proficient on the M1A1 Abrams Tank and M2A2 Bradley Fighting Vehicle.

Commanded by Lieutenant Colonel Hennisse, the approximately 400 men of the squadron trained nine months before becoming the first squadron to leave for the regiment's inaugural deployment, to the Philippines. Arriving in January 1902, Troops A and D patrolled Samar, where they fought the regiment's first engagement.

In 1905, the regiment relocated to Fort Des Moines, Iowa. In 1906, the 1st Squadron remained in Des Moines while the rest of the regiment deployed to Cuba as part of President Theodore Roosevelt's Army of Pacification. In 1909, the 1st Squadron rejoined the rest of the regiment in Fort Oglethorpe in Georgia.

On 12 March 1916, the regiment received orders to join General John J. Pershing as part of the Mexican Punitive Expedition to pursue Pancho Villa. Nine days later, the 1st Squadron led the way, arriving in Mexico on 21 March. Later, the 1st Squadron rode 22 hours straight to the rescue of United States forces besieged in Parral.

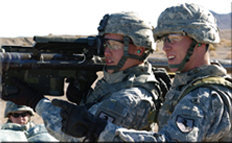
Soldiers from India Battery ADA, 1st Squadron, 11th ACR participate in Stinger missile live fire over the skies of Ft. Irwin, California.

The 11th ACR was not deployed during World War I. During this period, 1st Squadron conducted port operations in Newport News, Virginia. After the Armistice, the regiment, with its predominantly black horses, was stationed at the Presidio of Monterey, in California. The Army reorganizations for World War II eliminated the horse cavalry in 1940 and 1st Squadron traded in "saddles and hooves" for "tracks and steel". The regiment was inactivated 15 July 1942. The personnel and equipment of the former 1st and 2nd Squadrons was combined to form the newly designated 11th Tank Battalion, which later fought at the Battle of the Bulge.

On 1 April 1951, the regiment was reactivated as the 11th Armored Cavalry Regiment, as part of the build-up for the Korean War. The regiment served in Fort Carson in Colorado and Fort Knox in Kentucky, until deploying to Germany to replace the 6th ACR along the Czechoslovak border.

In July 1964, 1st Squadron, along with the regiment, transferred to Fort Meade, Maryland. In 1966, the regiment deployed to Vietnam. The 1st Squadron earned the Valorous Unit Awards (twice), the Republic of Vietnam Cross of Gallantry (three times), and the Presidential Unit Citation. It was during the Vietnam War that the 11th ACR was granted authorization to wear its distinctive unit patch.

President Barack Obama awarded Alpha Troop of the 1st Squadron the Presidential Unit Citation on 20 October 2009, in recognition of a rescue mission 26 March 1970.

In February 1971, 1st Squadron was inactivated, then reactivated in May 1972, at Downs Barracks in Fulda, Germany.

During the Southwest Asia Campaign, Ironhorse operated Camp Colt, a scout training camp for reservists reporting to active duty. Following Desert Storm, the regiment deployed to Kuwait in support of Operation Positive Force from June 1991 to September 1991. 1st Squadron, along with the rest of the regiment, was inactivated at Fulda in March 1994.

The 1st Battalion, 63rd Armor Regiment, Fort Irwin, California, was reflagged 1st Squadron, 11th Armored Cavalry Regiment in October 1994 with the mission of Opposing Forces for the National Training Center and continues to do so today.

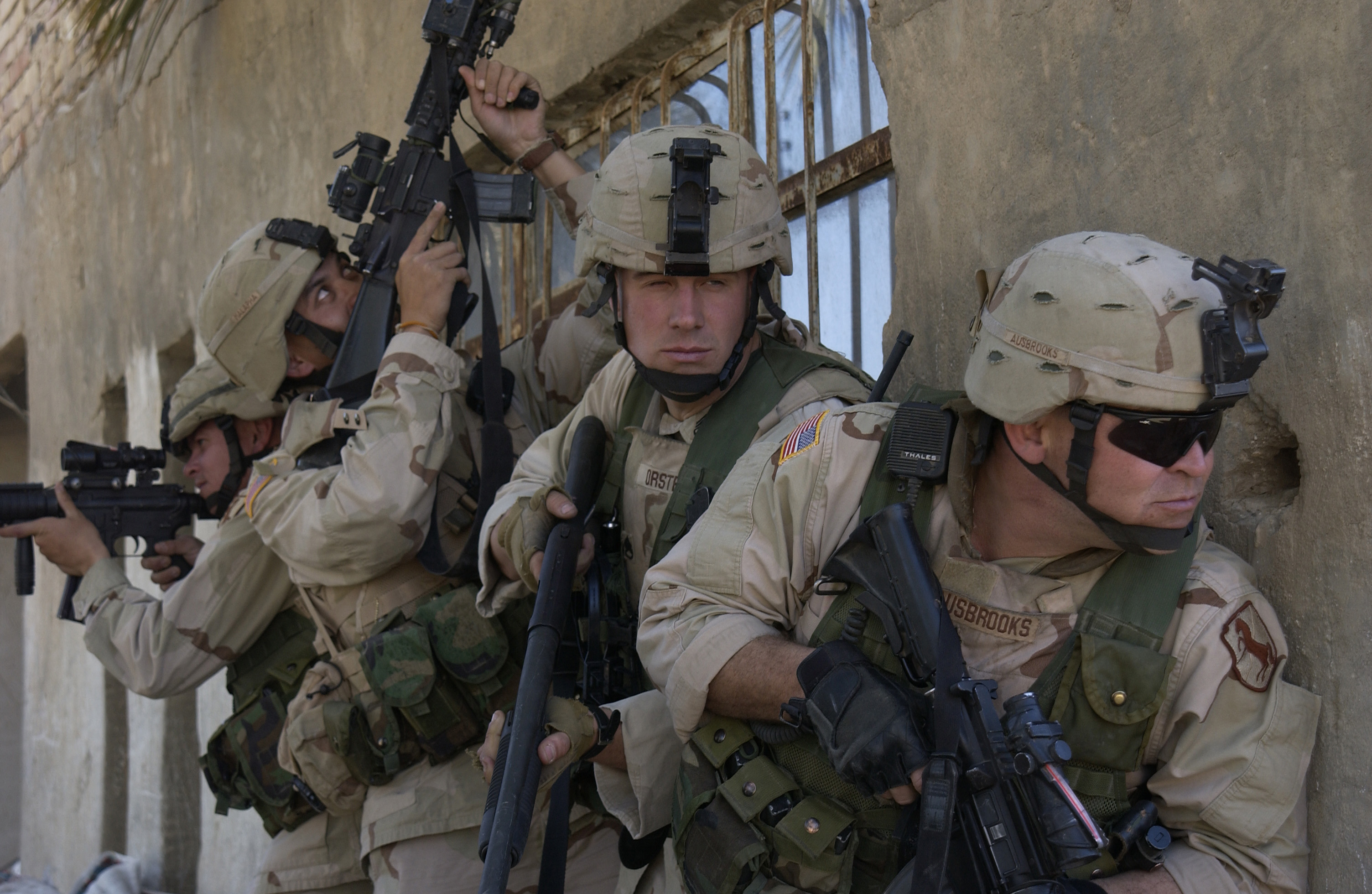
Soldiers assigned to the 11th ACR form up along a wall as they prepare to clear a building known to house insurgents in an area of Al Iskandariyah, Iraq, on 5 March 2005.

On 30 January 2005, 1st Squadron left Fort Irwin for Iraq. After spending about three weeks in Kuwait, the squadron moved to Camp Taji on the outskirts of Baghdad. The squadron was assigned the task of patrolling the Adhamiyah sector of Baghdad, a suburb of Baghdad just north of Sadr City. The squadron was also assigned the task of training Iraqi Army units to ultimately take over control of the sector.

On 21 May 2005, the squadron left Camp Taji for Camp Liberty, one of the many camps that encircle Baghdad International Airport. Their new task was to patrol the Abu Ghraib sector just west of Baghdad and to provide perimeter security for Abu Ghraib prison.

While in the Abu Ghraib sector, 1/11 ACR participated in Operation Thunder Cat along with the 256th Infantry Brigade of the Louisiana Army National Guard. The operation focused on disrupting IED cells in and around the Abu Ghraib sector, west of Baghdad. During this operation, 1/11 ACR uncovered five separate weapons caches, detained four suspected insurgents and uncovered $2,200 in US currency.

The squadron redeployed to Fort Irwin on 22 January 2006 where it resumed its opposing forces mission for the National Training Center. During its deployment, the Nevada Army National Guard's 1st Squadron, 221st Cavalry, the 11th's former official roundout unit, took over the duty of OPFOR.

=== 2nd Squadron ===
The 2nd Squadron is part of the Army's Opposing Force at the National Training Center, conducting battle operations in accordance with published doctrine and combat instructions. While in its role as the 801st Brigade Tactical Group, the Eaglehorse Squadron portrays an opposing force (OPFOR) that trains US forces in the basic principles of combined arms maneuver (CAM) and wide area security (WAS). The regiment trains brigade and battalion task forces during ten rotations a year at the National Training Center, Ft. Irwin, California. Additionally between rotations, the squadron conducts realistic, live-fire based training at the platoon and Bradley crew level.

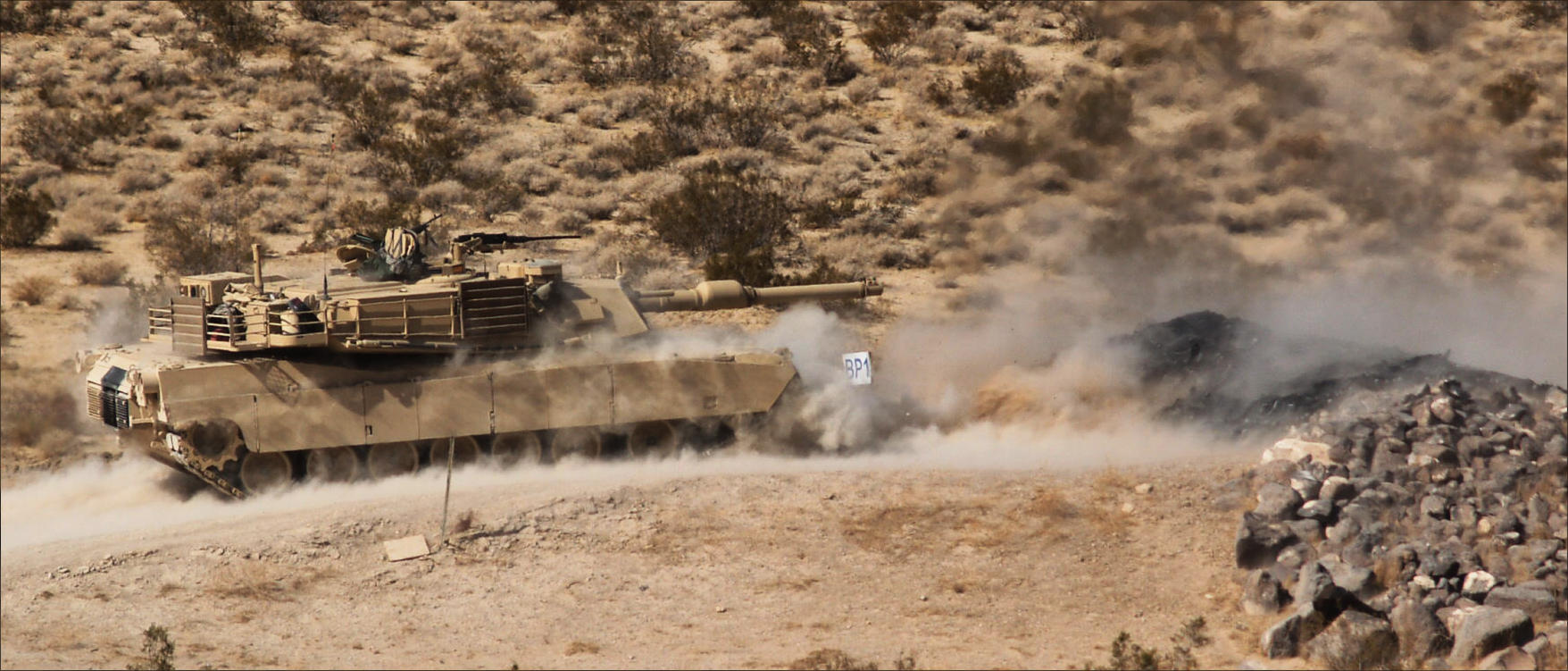
M1A1 Abrams assigned to H "Havoc" Troop, 2nd Squadron, conducts gunnery tactics at Fort Irwin, California, 2012.

The 1st Battalion (Mechanized), 52nd Infantry was inactivated on 26 October 1994 and the 2d Squadron was reactivated in its place by reflagging the existing unit. The 2d Squadron ("Eaglehorse") was activated on 2 February 1901 at Fort Myer, Virginia, and its military campaign geographic areas include the Philippines, Mexico, Europe, Vietnam, and support in Southwest Asia. 2nd Squadron deployed with the regiment to the Philippines to suppress insurgent forces during November 1901. This deployment was commemorated by the bolos becoming part of the Blackhorse crest. The Blackhorse Regiment settled in Fort Des Moines in Iowa in 1905.

The 2nd Squadron deployed to Cuba, 16 October 1906, as part of President Theodore Roosevelt's Army of Pacification. Their mission was to patrol and be a show of force. Eaglehorse joined with the General J. Pershing Pancho Villa Expedition in a punitive action against Mexico, with orders to pursue Pancho Villa, on 12 March 1916. Major Robert L. Howze, Commander, 2nd Squadron, led the "last mounted charge" on 5 May 1916, placing the Eaglehorse Squadron action as a milestone in military history.

The Blackhorse Regiment patrolled the U.S.-Mexican border from 1919 through 1942. The regiment received the name "Blackhorse" and a distinctive coat of arms while stationed at the Presidio of Monterey.

==== World War II ====
The regiment inactivated as a "horse regiment" on 15 July 1942 at Fort Benning in Georgia. The Headquarters and Headquarters Troop was redesignated on 19 April 1943 as the Headquarters and Headquarters Troop, 11th Cavalry Group Mechanized. The former squadrons of the 11th Cavalry were sent to fight with the 10th Armored Division and the 90th Infantry Division overseas. The new HHT, 11th Cavalry Group Mechanized drew new squadrons, the 36th and 44th, and also received an Assault Gun Troop (Howitzer Battery).

After guarding the US southeastern coast from March 1944 until 1 June 1944, the group moved to Camp Gordon, Georgia, to begin training for overseas deployment, The regiment arrived in the United Kingdom on 10 October 1944. The regiment entered France on 23 November 1944. Moving through France and Germany, the Blackhorse was assigned to the Ninth US Army and attached to XIII Corps, whose flank the Blackhorse screened during the corps' sweep from the Roer to the Rhine.

=== 3rd Squadron ===
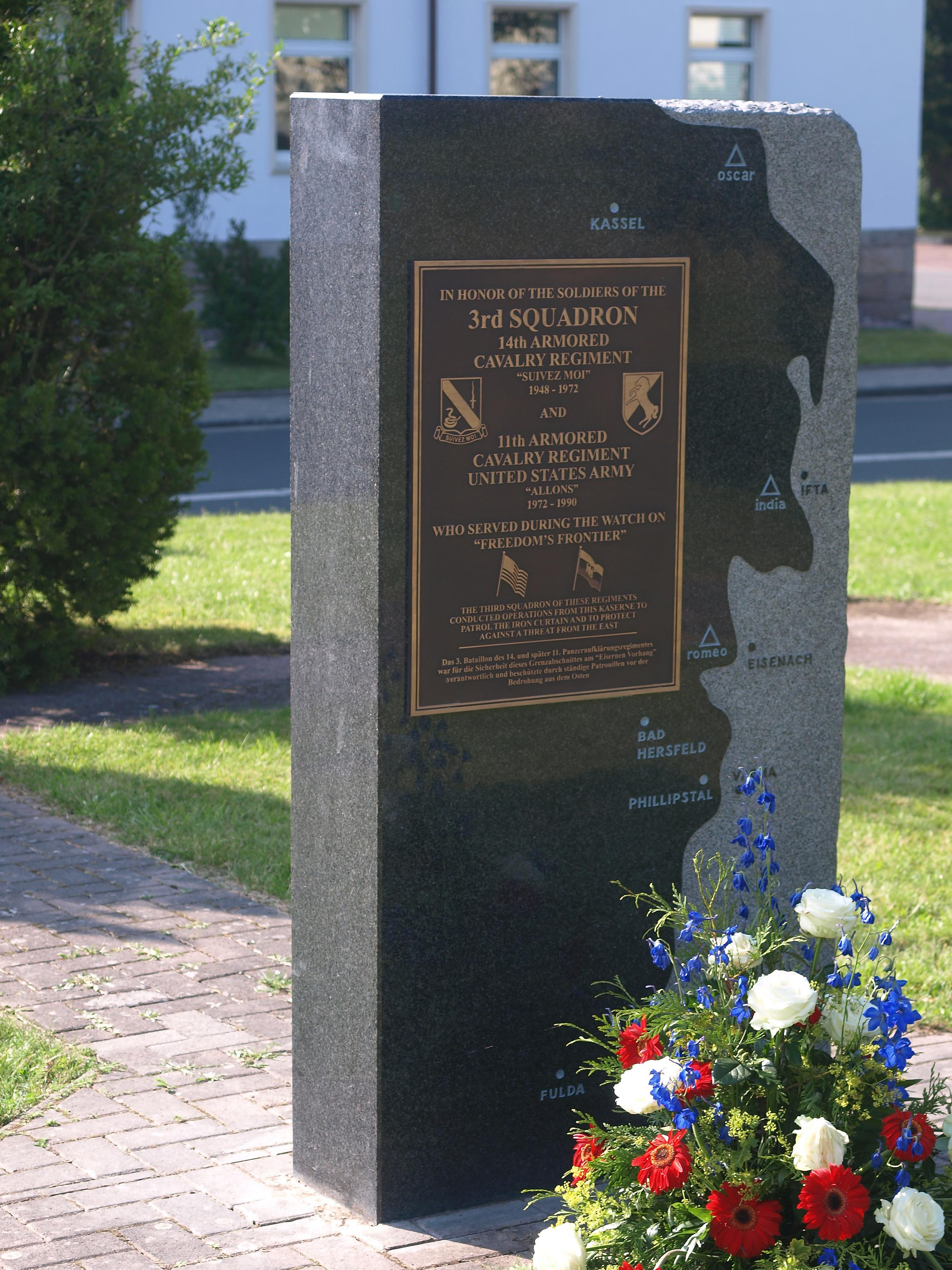
Memorial stone to 3rd Squadron in Bad Hersfeld.

Post-Vietnam, the 3rd Squadron ("Workhorse") was based at McPheeters Barracks in Bad Hersfeld, Germany, about 40 kilometers north of Fulda. The 3rd Squadron was organized as an armored cavalry squadron like the 1st and 2nd Squadrons. HHT and I, K, and L Troops, Howitzer Battery, as well as M Company were organic to the squadron. Attached was the 58th Engineer Company. Bravo Battery, 2nd Battalion, 2nd Air Defense Artillery was also headquartered with the squadron. In the field, the attached units of the regiment like the 58th Engineer Company usually operated over a wide area, with smaller detachments dedicated to supporting the armored cavalry squadrons of the regiment.

=== 4th Squadron ===
The 11th Armored Cavalry Regiment (ACR) arrived in Viet Nam in September 1966, the Air Cavalry Troop (ACT), organic to the regiment, arrived in December of the same year with a complement of UH-1C Gunships and UH-1D Command and Control "slicks". Early in January 1967, ACT was flying combat support for the regiment's missions. It was after this time that ACT earned its nickname Thunderhorse because of the distinctive roaring sound of rotorwash over the rice paddies and the unit's distinctive Blackhorse insignia.

In July 1968, Air Cavalry Troop was reorganized into Air Troop (AT), consisting of nine AH-1G Cobra gunships, designated "reds" and nine OH-6 light observation helicopters (LOH), designated "whites", which flew in pairs as target acquisition and destroy missions as "pinks" and an aerial rifle platoon (ARP) "Blues" with infantry/cavalry scouts transported in the venerable UH-1 "Huey" (officially designated Iroquois).

Air Troop earnt the Republic of Vietnam Cross of Gallantry with Palm "VIETNAM 24 February – 19 May 1971" (DAGO 42, 1972) and the 1st platoon of AT earned the Presidential Unit Citation "DUC HOA 12 Mar – 1 Apr 1969" (DAGO 69, 1969) in addition to the regiment's awards and streamers. In January 1969, a Trooper from Air Troop, SFC Rodney J. T. Yano posthumously earned the Medal of Honor. In the course of a firefight, a white phosphorus grenade had exploded inside a UH-1. The pilots had lost control and the aircraft had "begun to descend." Blinded and having lost the use of one arm, Yano kicked the remaining fragments out of the aircraft, taking further wounds as he did so. The pilots were able to regain control and land at a hospital; Yano died later that day.

The aviation assets of the regiment were deactivated on 20 March 1972 and left Viet Nam. The regiment was reactivated on 17 May 1972 to replace the inactivated 14th ACR and on 18 September 1972, the newly formed Command and Control Squadron was formed at Sickles Army Airfield near Fulda. The regiment's new C&C Squadron was given the task of providing aerial surveillance of the 385-kilometer "iron curtain", which separated East and West Germany. C&C Squadron consisted of its headquarters elements, as well as Air Troop (AT/AHT) with its 3 UH-1H, 21 AH-1S(MOD) and 13 OH-58A. Combat Aviation/Support Troop (CAT/ST AIR), with its 13 UH-1H, including an Aerial Mine Platoon (AMP) and 6 OH-58A, 58th Combat Engineer Company (CEC). The 340th Army Security Agency (ASA) and the 84th Army Band. A detachment of two each OH-58A were assigned to the 2nd Squadron at Bad Kissingen and the 3rd Squadron at Bad Hersfeld.

In 1981, Air Troop, under the command of Major Joseph W. Sutton, won the Draper Cavalry Award; it was the first time an aviation unit had won the award. Later, under the command of Major Michael K. Mehaffey, Air Troop was recognized as the Army Aviation Association of America's (AAAA) Unit of the Year.

On 1 June 1982, Command and Control Squadron was redesignated as Regimental Combat Aviation Squadron (RCAS) and officially as the Combat Aviation Squadron (provisional), 11th Armored Cavalry Regiment and nicknamed "Lighthorse".

In the spring of 1984, Air Troop was once again named AAAA Aviation Unit of the Year. On 14 June of the same year, under the guidance of the Department of the Army's "Cavalry 86" and the new " J-series" Modified Table of Organization and Equipment (MTOE), elements of AT and CAT were combined to form the new 11th Combat Aviation Squadron (11th CAS), named "Thunderhorse" to honor the history of those Air Cavalry Troopers who had served before. The new squadron consisted of a Headquarters, and a Headquarters Troop, to include an Aircraft Maintenance Platoon (AVUM), designated "Crazyhorse"; Alpha Troop which was assigned a combat support aviation role, was the last Aerial Mine Platoon in the Army. It used a Yosemite Sam, clad in a cavalry uniform for its mascot and was called the "Miners"; Bravo Troop, an Attack Helicopter Troop used the old cobra logo from AT and later a bull dog; Charlie Troop, called "Tankbusters", an attack helicopter troop used the silhouette of a Soviet T-62 in an AH-1 turret gun site; Delta Troop an air cavalry troop was known as the "Death Riders" and used a "Jolly Roger" type skull on a red and white background: Echo Troop, an air cavalry troop used a red and white logo which included a large letter E an AH-1 and OH-58 profile; F Troop, an air cavalry troop used a cartoon figure of an AH-1 punching a Soviet MI-24(HIND) with the motto "Grab 'em by the nose – kick 'em in the ass" and the 511th Military Intelligence Company (MI/CEWI) "Trojan Horse" which had replaced the 340th ASA. In 1984, three EH-1H were assigned to the 511th. The squadron's S-4 section was known as "Hobbyhorse".

On 17 Jun 1986 the squadron aligned itself in accordance with the US Army Regimental System (USARS). Now flying UH-60's, OH-58C's and AH-1F's, the squadron eventually ended up as HHT, N, O, P, Q, R S and AVUM Troops. On 9 November 1989 the wall fell and by the first of March 1990, the squadron ceased border operations. Early on 10 April 1991 elements of the squadron were issued no notice deployment orders to self-deploy from Fulda to Diyarbakır, Turkey in support of Operation Provide Comfort. Task Force Thunderhorse deployed 15 UH-60 and five OH-58D along with crews and support personnel. During this period the 511th MI (CEWI) was recognized as the best company sized military intelligence unit in the Army. With the fall of the wall, and the collapse of the Warsaw Pact, the regiment on 15 October 1993 to 15 March 1994 began the deactivation process of the unit. The regiment, less the 3rd and 4th Squadrons, was reactivated in October 1994 at Fort Irwin California.

=== Support Squadron ("Packhorse") ===
Support Squadron, 11th ACR provides combat support/combat service support to the 11th ACR and NTC Opposing Force and conducts deployment, survivability and MOS sustainment training IOT ensure the success of the regiment, OPFOR, and squadron.

"Packhorse", was activated in Germany under the command of LTC Ronald Kelly on 17 September 1985 to support the Blackhorse as it patrolled the East-West German border along the Fulda Gap. The squadron's official name at that time was Combat Support Squadron (CSS). The nickname "Packhorse" is derived from the early days of the U.S. Cavalry, when soldiers went on campaigns accompanied by packhorses, additional horses and/or mules that carried all their essential supplies. Everything from food to gunpowder to horseshoes were transported in this manner.

Initial organization included five units—Headquarters and Headquarters Troop, Maintenance Troop, Supply and Transportation Troop, Medical Troop, and the attached 54th Chemical Detachment. The squadron also operated the Regimental Material Management Center which had the responsibility for the overall logistics state of the regiment. Elements of the squadron were initially based at both Fulda and Wildflecken Training Area until S&T Troop relocated to Fulda in spring 1990. The squadron was large for a battalion-sized unit, as the Maintenance Troop alone had some 400 soldiers assigned. The Packhorse provided logistical support during both the frequent regimental maneuvers of the Cold War and at gunnery exercises at Grafenwoehr, where the squadron operated for weeks at a time while the cavalry troops and tank companies rotated through the firing ranges.

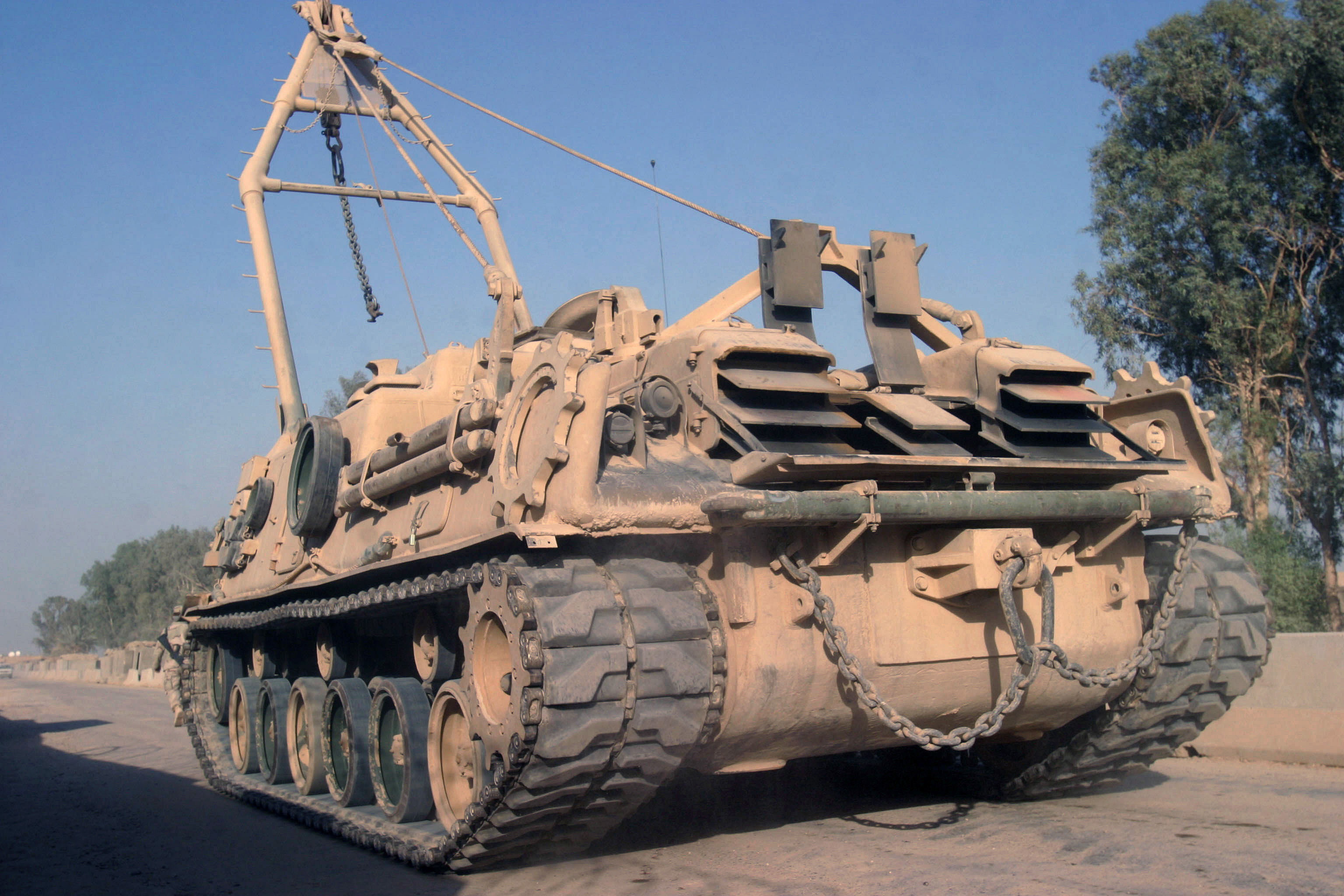
M88 of the 11th ACR in Iraq, 2005

Squadron vehicles during the Cold War included 3/4-ton M1009 CUCV's, 1&1/4-ton M1008 and M1010 pickup trucks that often carried special-purpose shelters mounting communications, medical, or maintenance equipment, HEMTT's, M88's, tanker trucks, and trucks carrying chemical decontamination equipment. A pair of M934 5-ton Expansible Vans ("Expando-vans") housed the squadron headquarters in the field. The Supply & Transport Troop was a 215-man element consisting of five platoon units - HQ Platoon, Supply Platoon (An Ammunition CL V Section, a Supply Section CL II/IV, and Water purification Section), Transportation Platoon (6 HETTs, 20 ea 5-Ton Cargo Trucks, 20 ea Stake and Platform (S&T) Trucks each with two trailers, POL Platoon (22 ea, 5000 Gal Fuel Tankers), and an Organic Maintenance Platoon. The squadron was also capable of highly specialized functions such as the provision of potable water by filtering fresh water sources through purification units.

On 3 October 1990, the two Germanys re-unified. By December 1991 the Soviet Union dissolved, ending squadron's six-year presence along the Iron Curtain. In August 1990, Iraq invaded Kuwait, prompting the United States to respond. On 16 May 1991, the Packhorse received orders to deploy to Kuwait to support the regiment as it secured the country while it struggled to rebuild after the war. By October, the regiment had completed its mission and the Packhorse returned to Fulda. As the need for U.S. forces in Europe decreased, the Packhorse was inactivated on 15 February 1994, followed by the Blackhorse on 15 March 1994.

The 177th Forward Support Battalion was inactivated on 26 October 1994, becoming the Regimental Support Squadron, 'Packhorse' now carrying its new role with the U.S. Army's Opposing Forces at the National Training Center. One unit that did not convert, was the 164th Chemical Company. Due to its pending inactivation in the spring of 1995, leaving only two platoons then being assigned to HHT, RSS.

=== Headquarters and Headquarters Troop ===
==== Mission ====
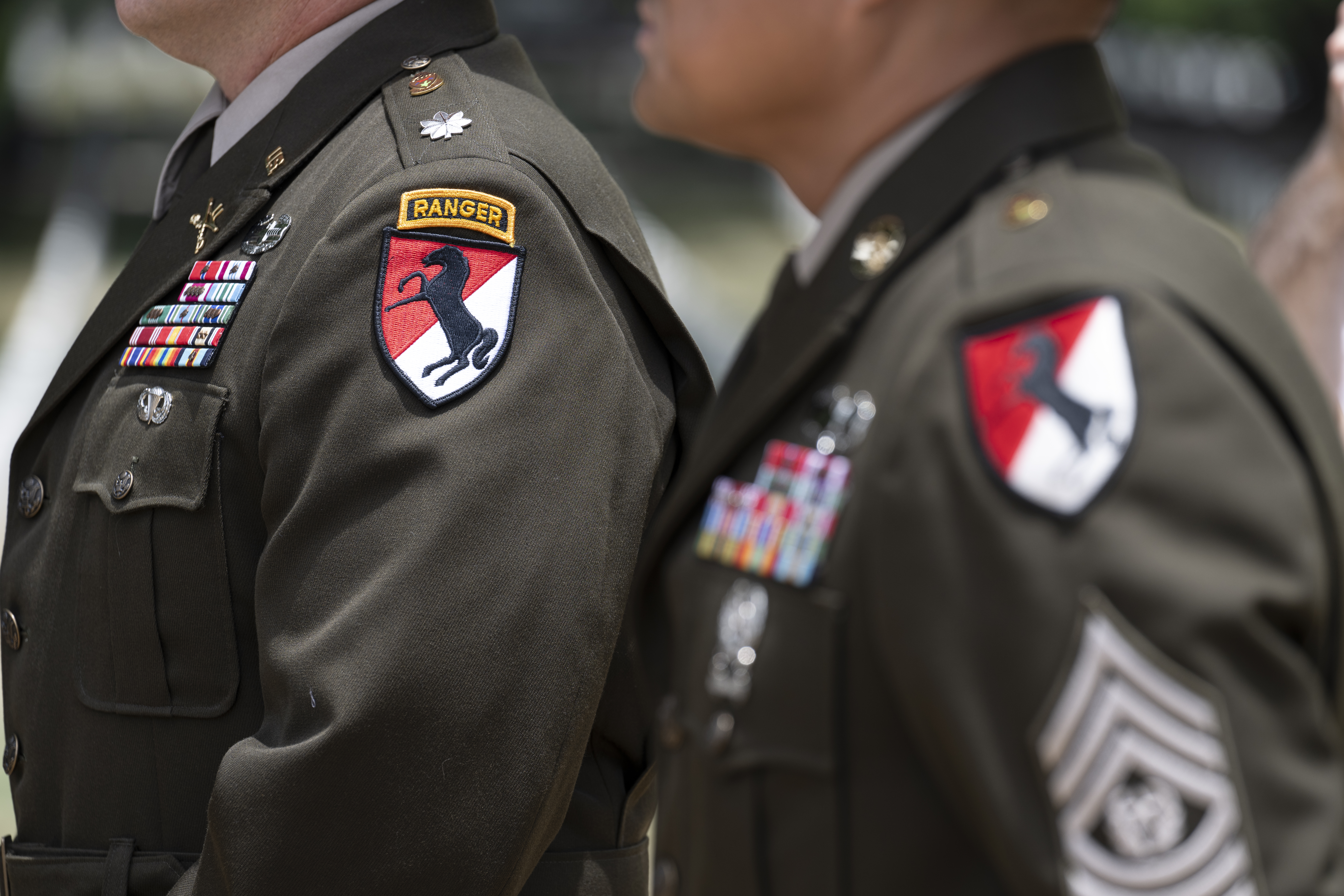
Military Funeral Honors with Funeral Escort are Conducted for Retired U.S. Army Col. James Snodgrass in Section 78 of Arlington National Cemetery, Arlington, Virginia, June 25, 2024

Provide personnel, administrative, and logistical support to the Regimental Support Squadron. Provide food service support to all NTC units in both the field and garrison. While providing this support, HHT will protect the force, and provide an adequate quality of life for its troopers and families.

Headquarters Platoon

Headquarters Platoon's mission is to support the troop administration, logistics, and preparation for war. The platoon consists of the troop commander's staff. They are the orderly and training room, communications section, motor pool, NBC room, unit supply, and arms room. The orderly room supports the troop in administration. The training room schedules training and maintains the troop readiness status. The motor pool supports the troop in organizational level maintenance. The NBC room supports the troop in nuclear, biological, and chemical training, and the unit supply supports the troop in organizational supply and arms room.

Also attached to the headquarters platoon are the cavalry scouts and mortar platoons. The cavalry scouts use high speed maneuvering and advanced optical equipment to identify targets. The mortar platoon uses the heavy 120 MM mortar system to provide long range indirect fire.

Field regimental dining facility The Field Regimental Dining Facility (FRDF) Platoon supports 10 rotations per year. The mission is to provide Class I in the field for the 11th Armored Cavalry Regiment Opposing Force (OPFOR) during all force-on-force rotations.

==== Horse Detachment ====
The 11th ACR Horse Detachment is a Special Ceremonial Unit tasked with preserving the history and traditions of the Regiment's original mounted Cavalry Troopers, and is 1 of only 6 Mounted Units left in the Active Duty U.S. Army. The Horse Detachment represents the 11th ACR, Fort Irwin, and the United States Army at official ceremonies, on-post and regional community relations events, and Army recruiting and community outreach objectives.

==== Maintenance Troop ====
Maintenance Troop's mission is to provide class IX support and conduct direct support maintenance for the 11th Armored Cavalry Regiment.

===== MT 1st Platoon =====
Headquarters Platoon consists of the commander's staff, motor pool, shop office, NBC room, orderly room, technical supply and unit supply. This is the largest platoon in the troop. The main mission of this platoon is to keep the troop ready for war at all times.

The shop office is the backbone of direct support maintenance. The shop officer and the repair control sergeant direct all the maintenance support for the regiment. They order repair parts and track the parts from the time it is ordered, to the time the part is received. They also track all maintenance jobs from initial inspection to actual repair to final inspection and pick-up by the customer.

Technical supply work 24-hour days, 7 days a week, providing Class IX repair parts to the OPFOR. They provide serviceable assets which include major assemblies, DLRs (Depot Level Reparables), Repairable Exchange Items and ASL stockage.

The mission of NBC room is to provide nuclear, biological and chemical training to the troop. The training room is in charge of planning and executing training for the entire troop. The orderly room provides administrative support to the whole troop. The supply room provides organizational supply. The motor pool's mission is to provide organizational maintenance for all vehicles and commo equipment for the entire troop.

===== MT 2nd Platoon =====
Second Platoon is divided in 2 sections: Automotive, Armament, and Fuel & Electrical, which include 41C, 44B, 44E, 45B, 45E, 45G, 63G, 63H, and 63W MOSs. The mission of the above-mentioned personnel is to provide quality direct support in the areas of repair parts (generators, alternators and starters), recovery assistance, welding and machine shop assistance, and automotive repair.

The Automotive section provides direct support maintenance to the 11th Armored Cavalry Regiment and Allied units in support of the OPFOR's daily mission. This entails repairing and replacing transmissions, steering gears, transfers, fuel injector pumps, differentials, engines, axles and necessary gaskets and seals for various types of wheel vehicles. The above jobs are just a few of the tasks that the automotive section does to ensure that the OPFOR equipment returns to the battlefield as quickly as possible.

The Fuel & Electric section provides support in the areas of repairing and replacing wiring harnesses, generators, alternators, starters, brake shoe linings and the resurfacing of brake drums. In addition the F&E section repairs and replaces fan towers, gear assemblies and shocks for the M551 tank.

The Armament section provides support for the main turret, ballistic computers, laser ranger finders, and other armament controls for the M1A1 Abrams, main battle field tank, as well as the various small arms repair and aiming devices.

===== MT 3rd Platoon =====
Third platoon consists of Ground Support Equipment repair, Service and Recovery, and the Communications / Electronics shop, which include 35C, 35E, 35F, 35N, 52C, 52D, 63B and 63J MOSs. This platoon is usually referred to as '3rd shift, 3rd shop', because when mission calls they often work around the clock.

The GSE section is tasked with repairing engineer equipment. GSE repairs and returns the equipment to the NTC battlefield.

The Communication / Electronics shop works to repair the regiment's radios. The special electronics devices section of the 3rd platoon maintains NVGs for the regiment. They also ensure that all chemical agent monitors and navigational satellite systems are maintained.

The Service and Recovery section has a continuous mission of providing recovery to disabled vehicles for the post. They are trained to inspect a vehicle and if possible fix the vehicle on the spot so that it can continue its mission, but if that is not possible then they are trained to recover the vehicle with any available means. There are no manuals written on how to recover a damaged vehicle, the manuals that exist only talk about the principles of recovery and the capabilities of each recovery vehicle. It is only by experience on the job that the soldier decides on how a vehicle will be recovered.

The section is composed of 91 E (Allied Trade Specialist) They are both a Welder and a machinist. They can manufacture a functional part from a piece of metal or they can fabricate anything within the limitation of the equipment they have.

===== MT 4th Platoon =====
Maintenance Support Team (MST) Platoon's mission is to provide dedicated direct support maintenance. The MST platoon is made up of 2 different MOS: 63W (wheel vehicle repairer) and 63Y (track vehicle mechanic).

==== Supply and Transportation Troop ("Stallions") ====
The Supply & Transportation Troop, Regimental Support Squadron, 11th Armored Cavalry Regiment, Fort Irwin, California, provides support to the Opposing Force (OPFOR) soldiers of the 11th Armored Cavalry Regiment. While supporting the soldiers of the OPFOR with Class I (food), II (heaters, chemlights), III (fuel), and IV (construction material) as well as all the transportation requirements needed on the NTC battlefield, S&T Troop will also provide a better quality of living for its soldiers and their families. There are four platoons (Headquarters/Supply, Maintenance, Petroleum, and Transportation). The unit is responsible for the direct support of Class I (Ration Break Point), Class III (Bulk and Aviation fuel), Class IV (lumber), Class VII (major items), field services, and direct transportation support with light, medium, and heavy capability assets. Also, it is responsible for maintaining and issuing civilian vehicles in support of the OPFOR to replicate the presence of civilians on a battlefield (COBs).

===== Supply Platoon =====
S&T's Supply Platoon mission includes the Class I breakdown for each rotation, the issuing of COB-Vs prior to rotations and the issuing of Allied Fleet Vehicle prior to rotation. The Supply Platoon consists of four 6K forklifts, over 50 COB-Vs and over 25 Allied Fleet vehicles. In addition to all this the Supply Platoon is the housing and issuing point for all regimental CL IV.

===== Transportation Platoon =====
The S&T Transportation Platoon missions consist of transporting Class I, II, IV, V, and Class IX. In addition to hauling that the Transportation Platoon is often tasked to haul tracked vehicles with their 8 Heavy Equipment Transport Systems. Along with the 8 HET systems the Transportation Platoon has 4 PLS systems, 14 M931 tractors, 5 XM 1098 3000 gallon water tankers and 22 M871 flat bed trailers.

===== Fuel & Water Platoon =====
S&T's Fuel & Water platoon mission consists of providing CL III (B) support for the regiment. This includes forward area resupply point (FARP) and Refuel On the Move (ROM) capabilities in order to support rotational CL III requirements. The platoon consists of two M978 HEMTT 10-ton, 2500 gal. Fuel Servicing trucks; eight M969 5000 gallon semitrailer tankers; ten M931 5-ton truck tractors; and a 300K forward area refueling point system.

===== Maintenance Platoon =====
S&T's Maintenance Platoon's mission is to ensure that all of S&T's vehicles are able to be utilized to execute all missions tasked down to S&T. This means that the Maintenance Platoon must maintain the operational readiness of eight Heavy Equipment Transport systems (M1070/M1000 HET), 25 5-Ton truck tractors (M931s), 22 M871 trailers, five XM1098 3000 gallon water tankers, eight M969 5000 gallon semitrailer tankers, four Palletized Loading Systems (M1074/1075), four 6,000 pound forklifts, and other vehicles in the S&T fleet.

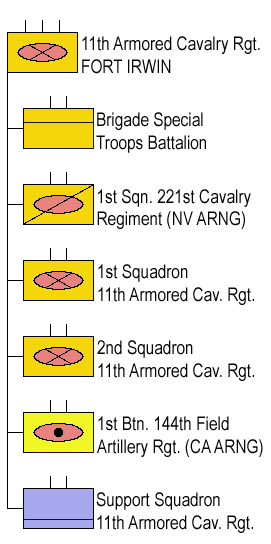
Order of battle

==== Headquarters and Headquarters Detachment, Task Force Palehorse ====
Headquarters and Headquarters Detachment, Task Force Palehorse, provides Observer-Controller/Trainer's (OC/T's) for the 11th Armored Cavalry Regiment.

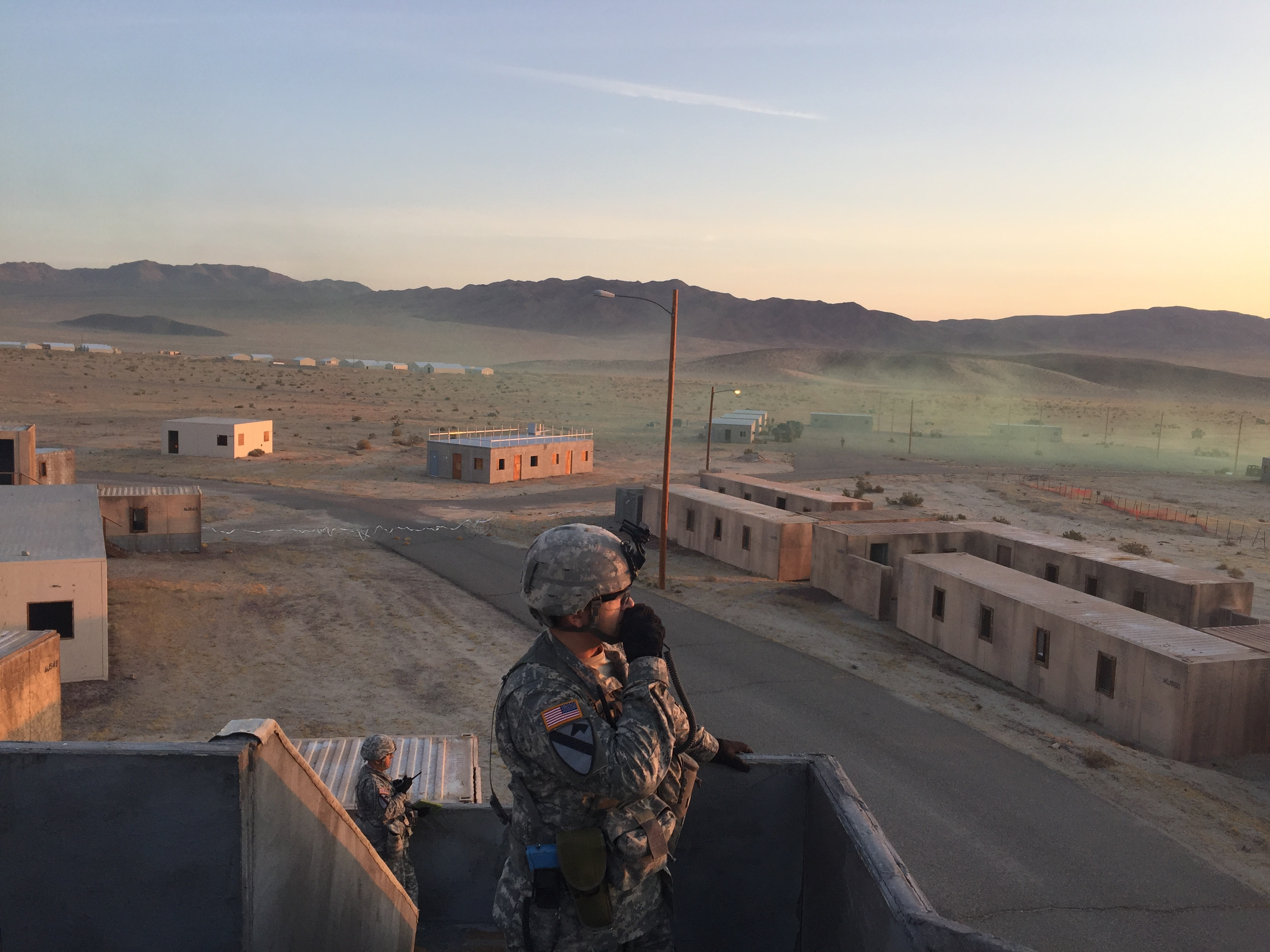
Task Force Palehorse OC/T overseeing urban operations at the NTC town of Razish

Task Force Palehorse works directly with Operations Group at the National Training Center to assist in meeting the training requirements for the Rotational Training Unit (RTU).

All permanent party members of Task Force Palehorse spend hours in training and are required to be subject matter experts (SME) in combined arms maneuver (CAM), wide area security (WAS) operations, the respective combination of CAM/WAS, Unified Land Operations and global insurgency tactics, techniques, and procedures (TTPs).

Task Force Palehorse provides feedback to units through professional After-Action Reviews and written reports in support of ten National Training Center rotations a year.

On order, Task Force Palehorse deploys as military advisors to foreign nations to aid with military training, organization, combat operations and other various military tasks.

== Current order of battle ==
11th Armored Cavalry Regiment

- Headquarters and Headquarters Detachment "PALEHORSE"
- 58th Engineer Company
- 1st Squadron, 11th Armored Cavalry Regiment (Combined Arms Squadron) "IRONHORSE"
- 2nd Squadron, 11th Armored Cavalry Regiment (Combined Arms Squadron) "EAGLEHORSE"
- 1st Battalion, 144th Field Artillery Regiment (CA ARNG)
- Regimental Support Squadron (RSS), 11th Armored Cavalry Regiment "PACKHORSE"

== Campaign participation credit ==
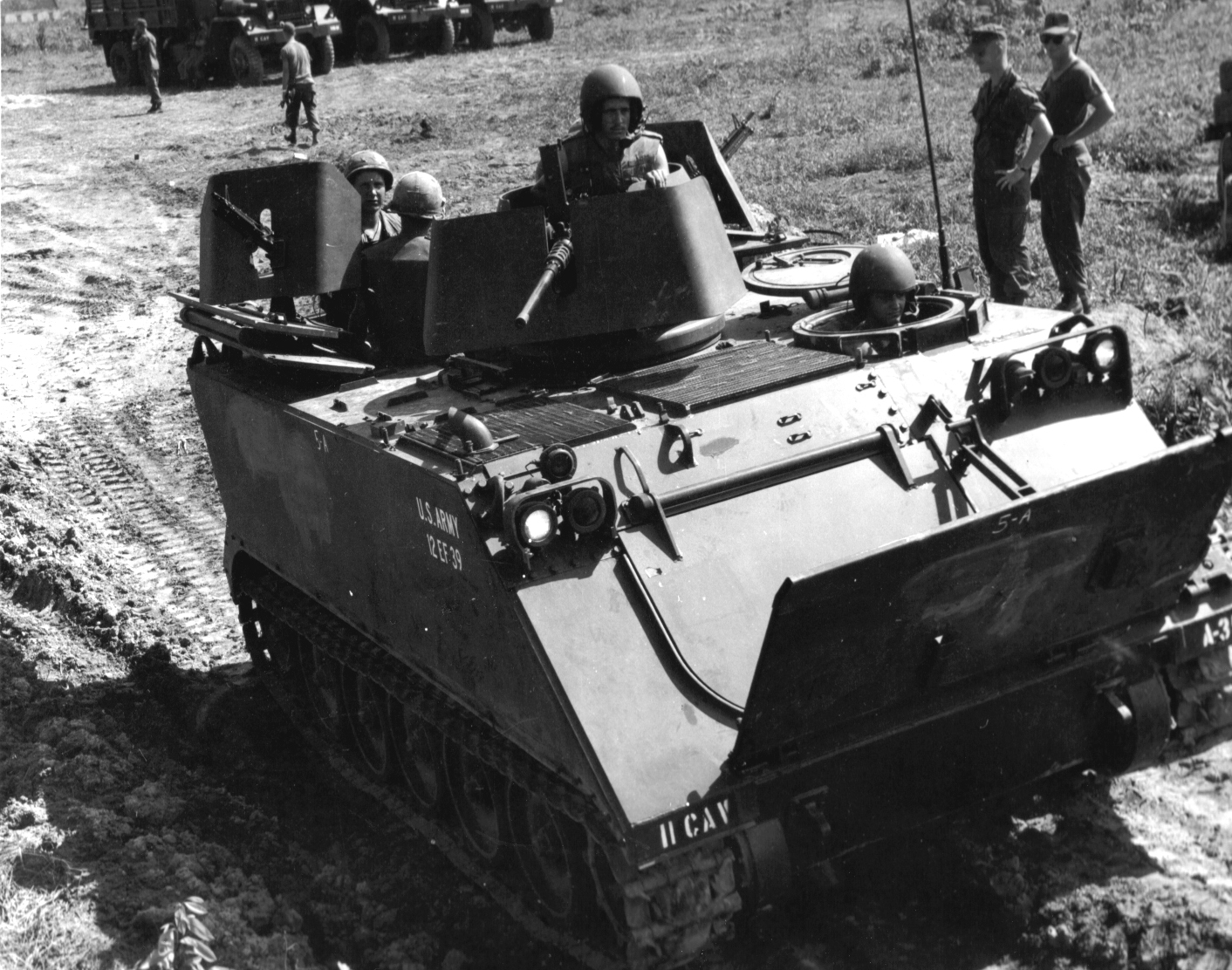
11th ACR Armored Cavalry Assault Vehicle in Vietnam.

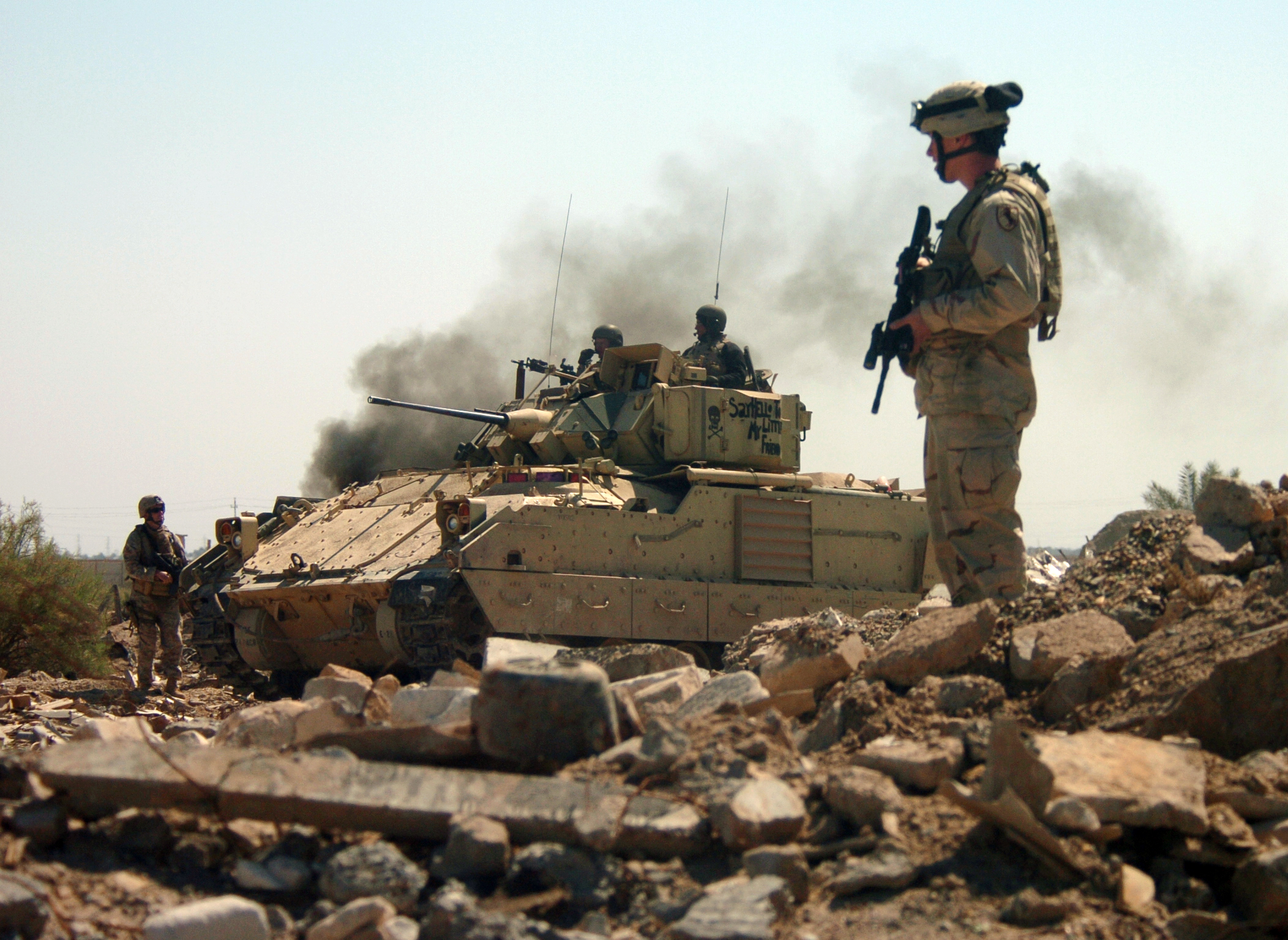
2nd Squadron troopers advance during a March 2005 raid in Babil, Iraq with M3A2 Bradley.

- Philippine–American War:
1. Samar 1902
- Mexican Expedition:
1. Mexico 1916–1917
- World War II:
1. Normandy 1944
2. Northern France 1944
3. Rhineland 1944–1945
4. Ardennes-Alsace 1944–1945
5. Central Europe 1945
- Vietnam:
1. Counteroffensive, Phase II 1966–1967
2. Counteroffensive, Phase III 1967–1968
3. Tet Counteroffensive 1968
4. Counteroffensive, Phase IV 1968
5. Counteroffensive, Phase V 1968
6. Counteroffensive, Phase VI 1968–1969
7. Tet 69/Counteroffensive 1969
8. Summer-Fall 1969
9. Winter-Spring 1970
10. Sanctuary Counteroffensive 1970
11. Counteroffensive, Phase VII 1970–1971
- Second Squadron Entitled to:
1. Consolidation I 1971
2. Consolidation II 1971–1972
3. Cease-Fire 1972–1973
- Southwest Asia:
1. Operation Desert Storm 1991 (only the regiment's scout platoons served in this conflict)
2. Cease-Fire 1991–1995
- Operation Iraqi Freedom
1. Iraqi Governance 2005–2006
- Operation Enduring Freedom
1. OEF 2009–2010 (1/221st Cavalry when they were assigned to 11th ACR)

== Gallery ==
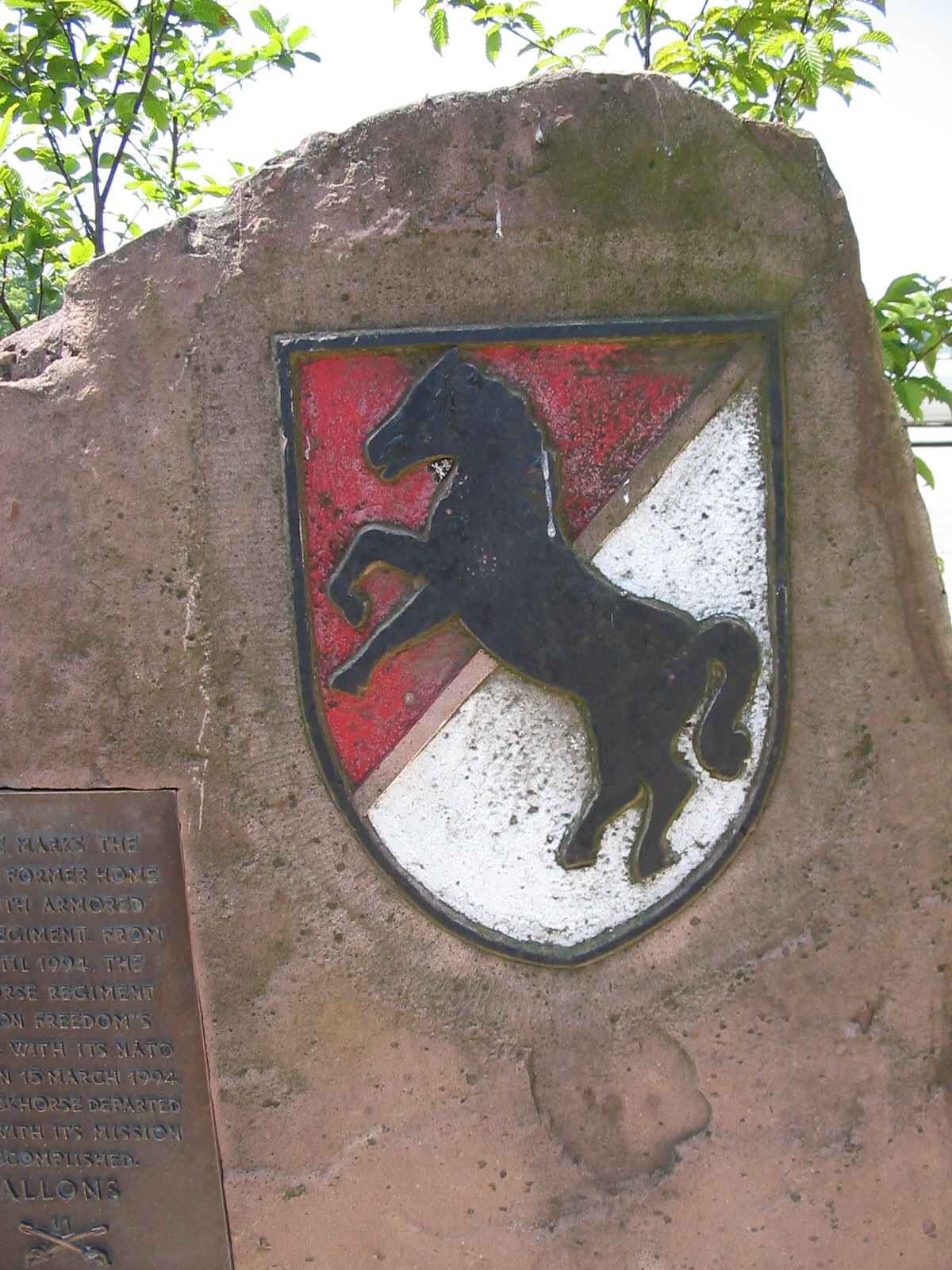
Memorial stone to the 11th ACR at the former Downs Barracks, Fulda, Germany.

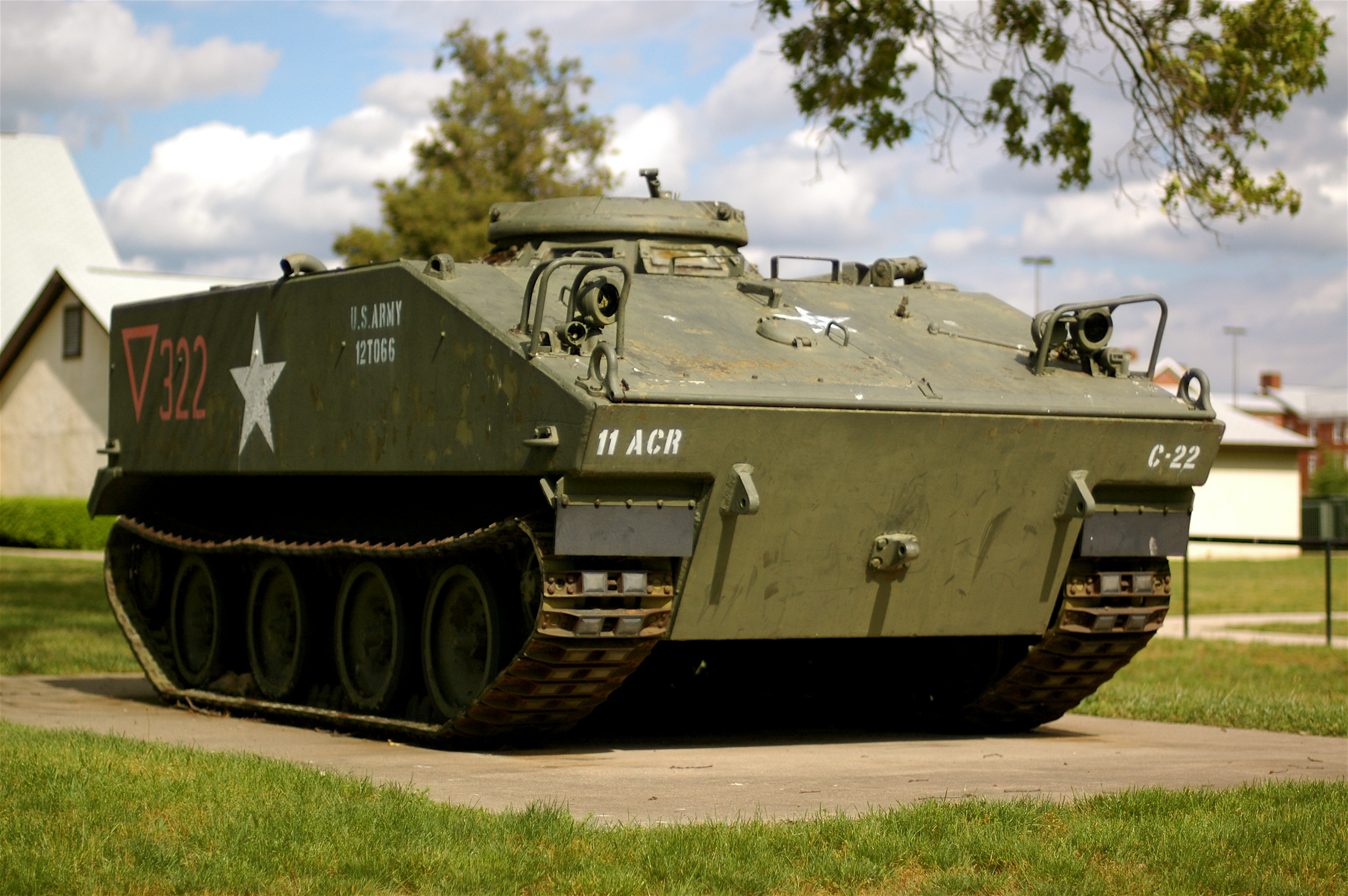
M114 scout vehicle, used by cavalry platoons in the 1960s and 1970s.

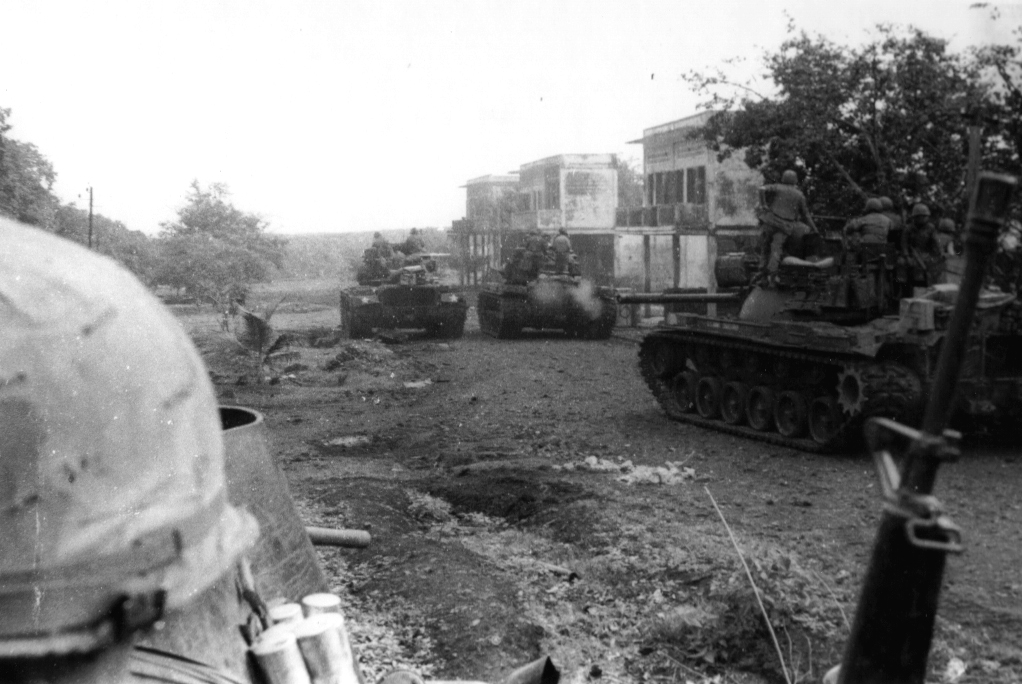
Advancing into Snuol, Cambodia, May 1970.

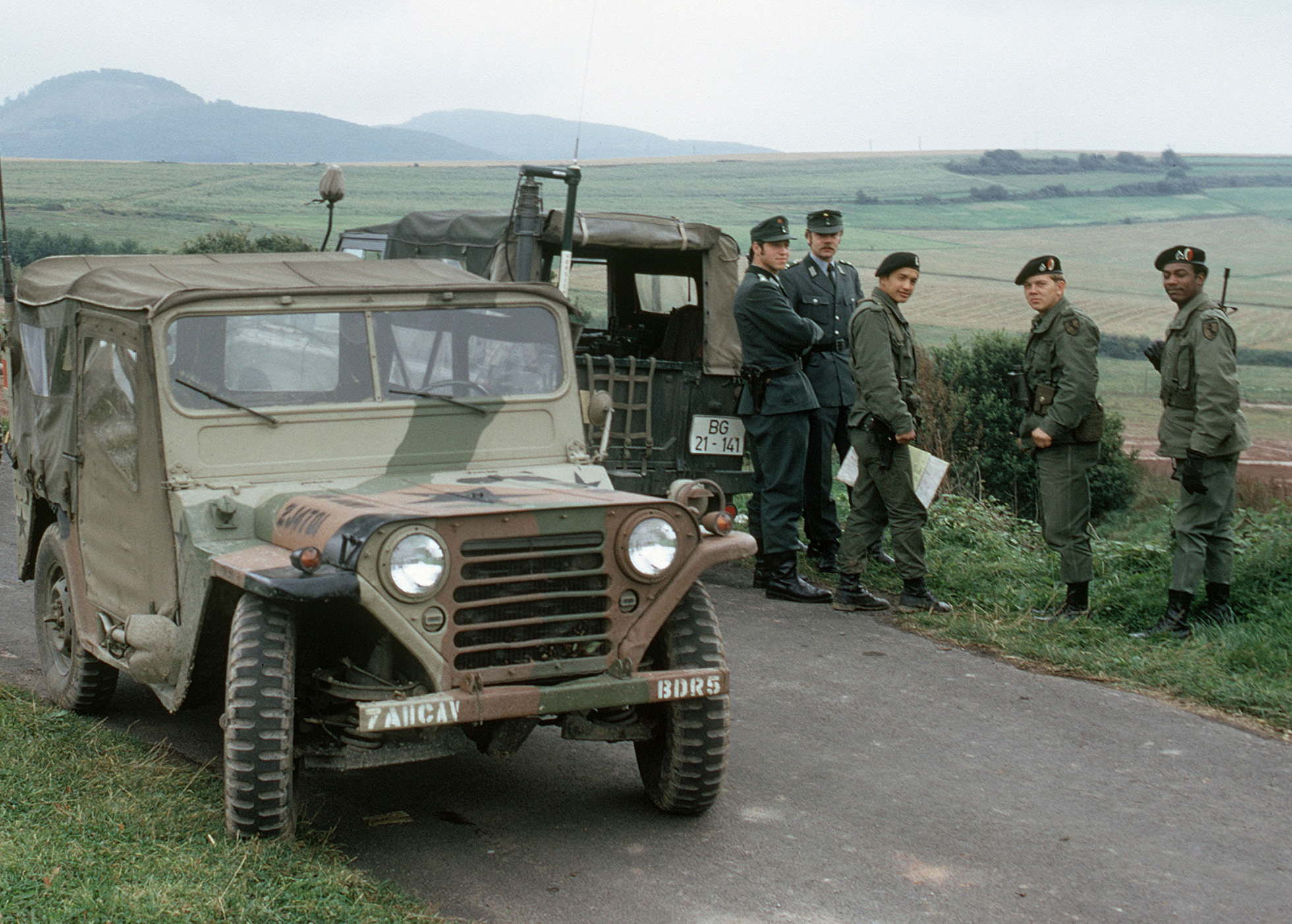
Working with German border police, 1979.

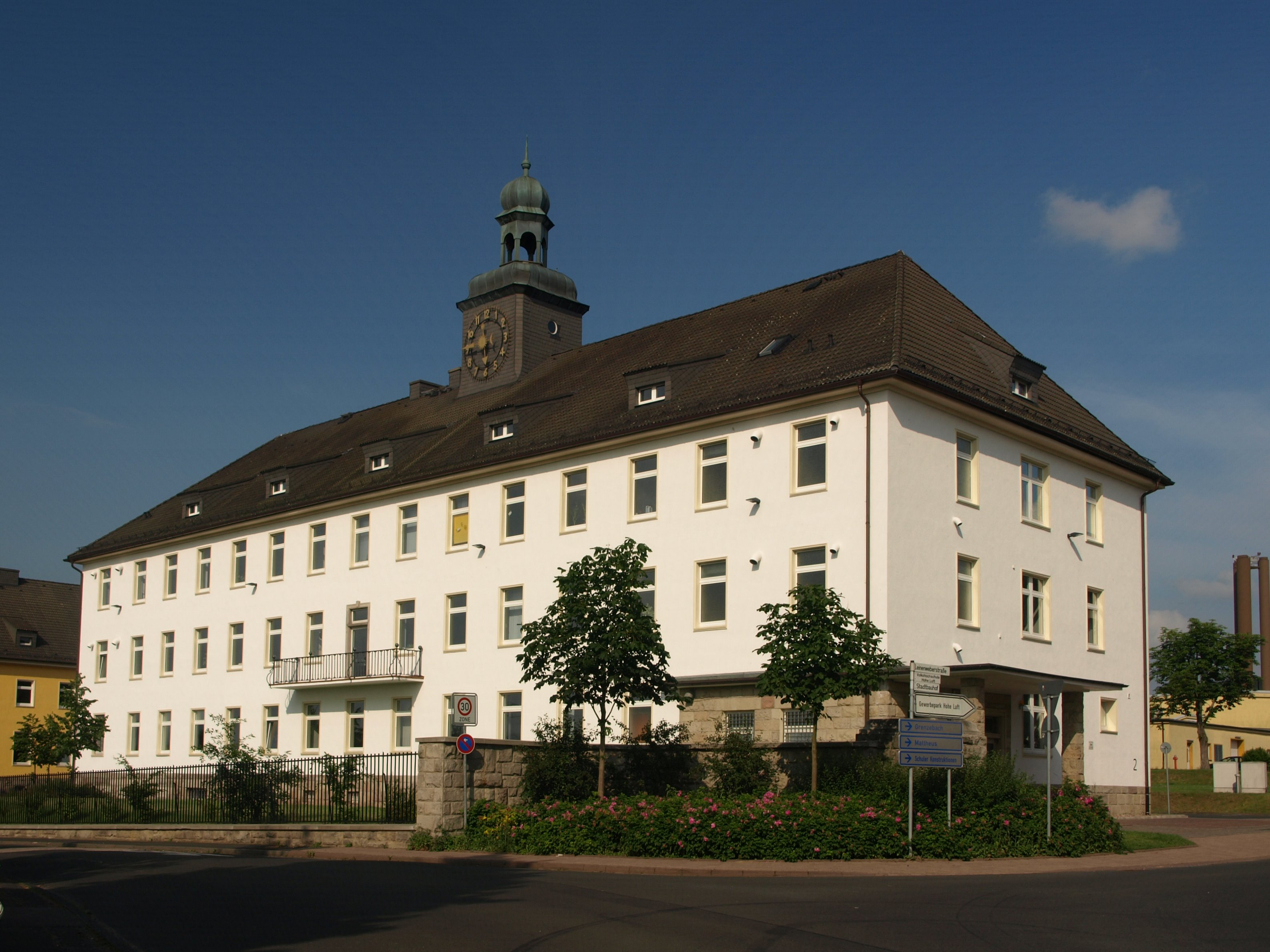
McPheeters Barracks, Bad Hersfeld, home of the 3rd Squadron from 1944 until 1992.

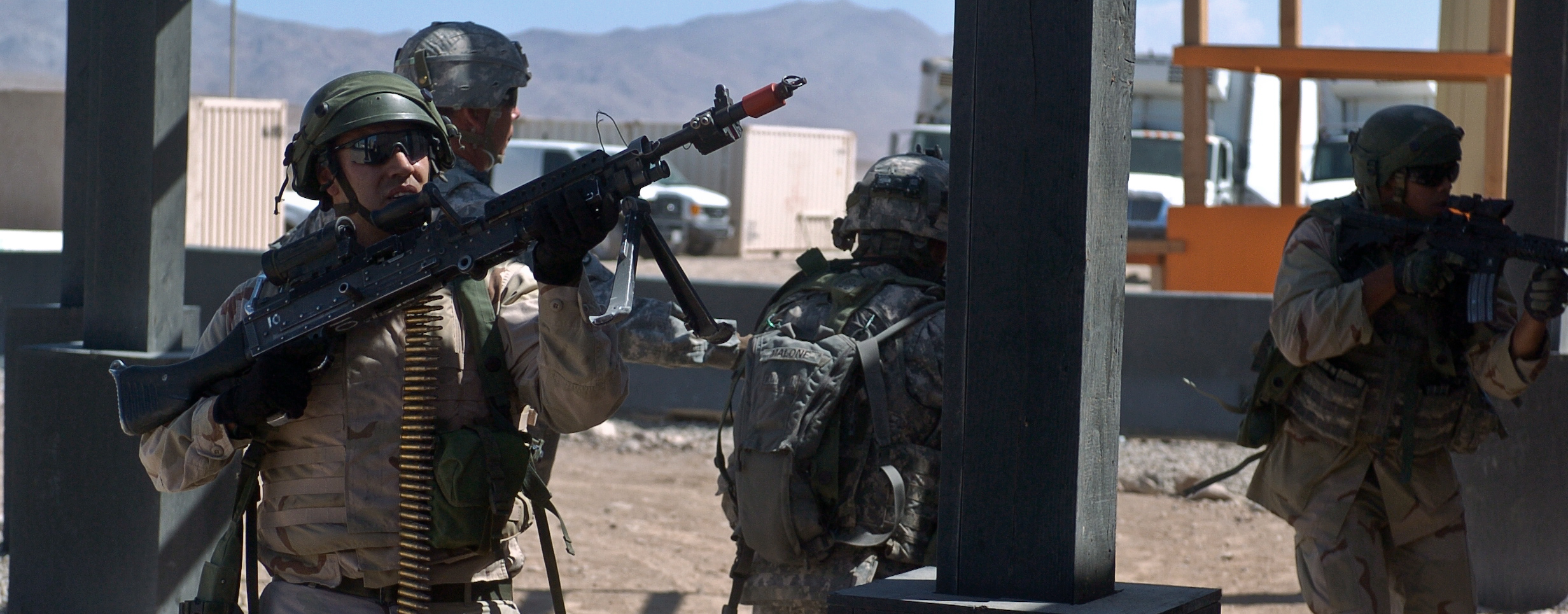
Acting as OPFOR at Fort Irwin.

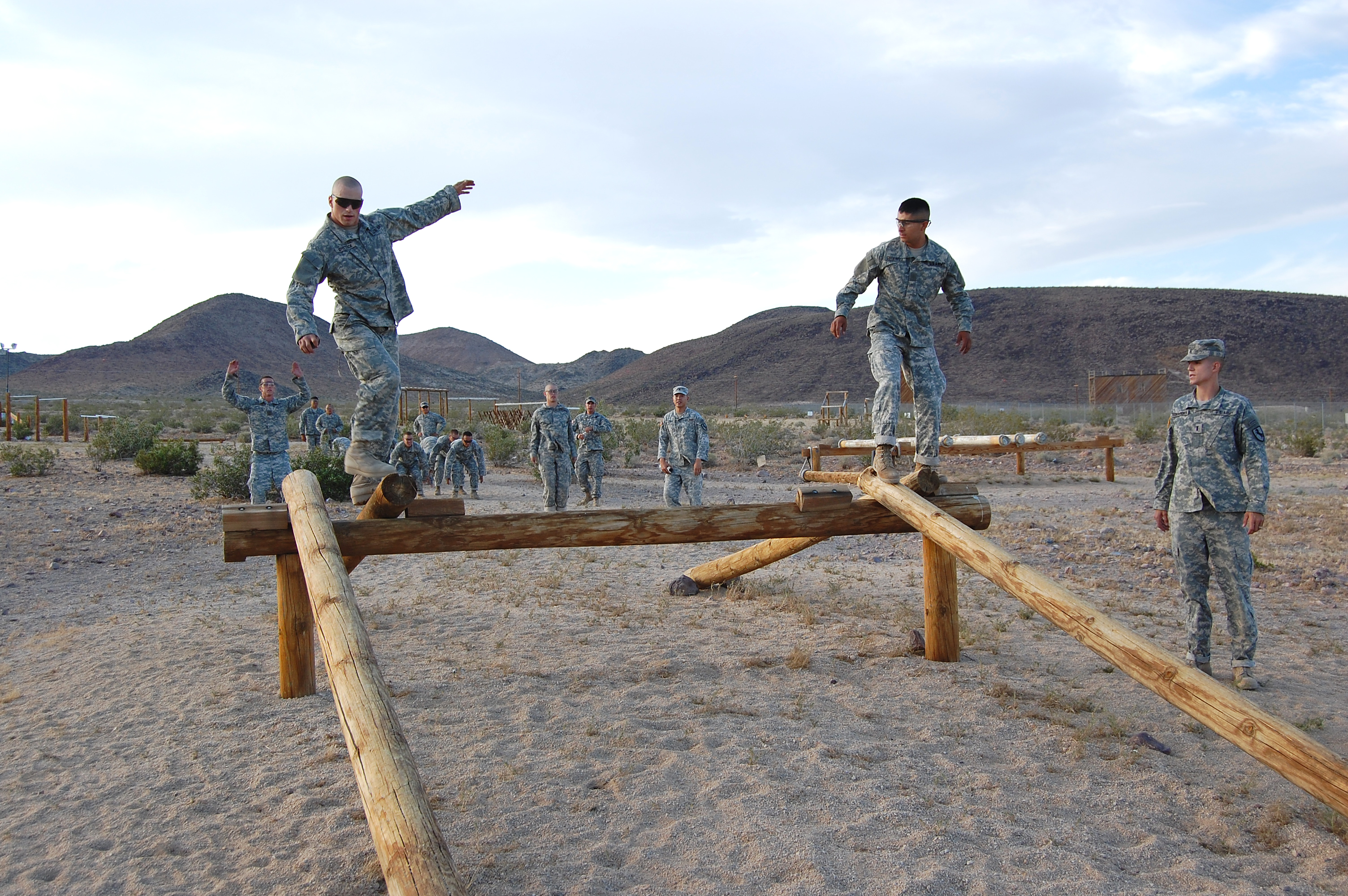
Soldiers of the 2nd Squadron training at Fort Irwin.

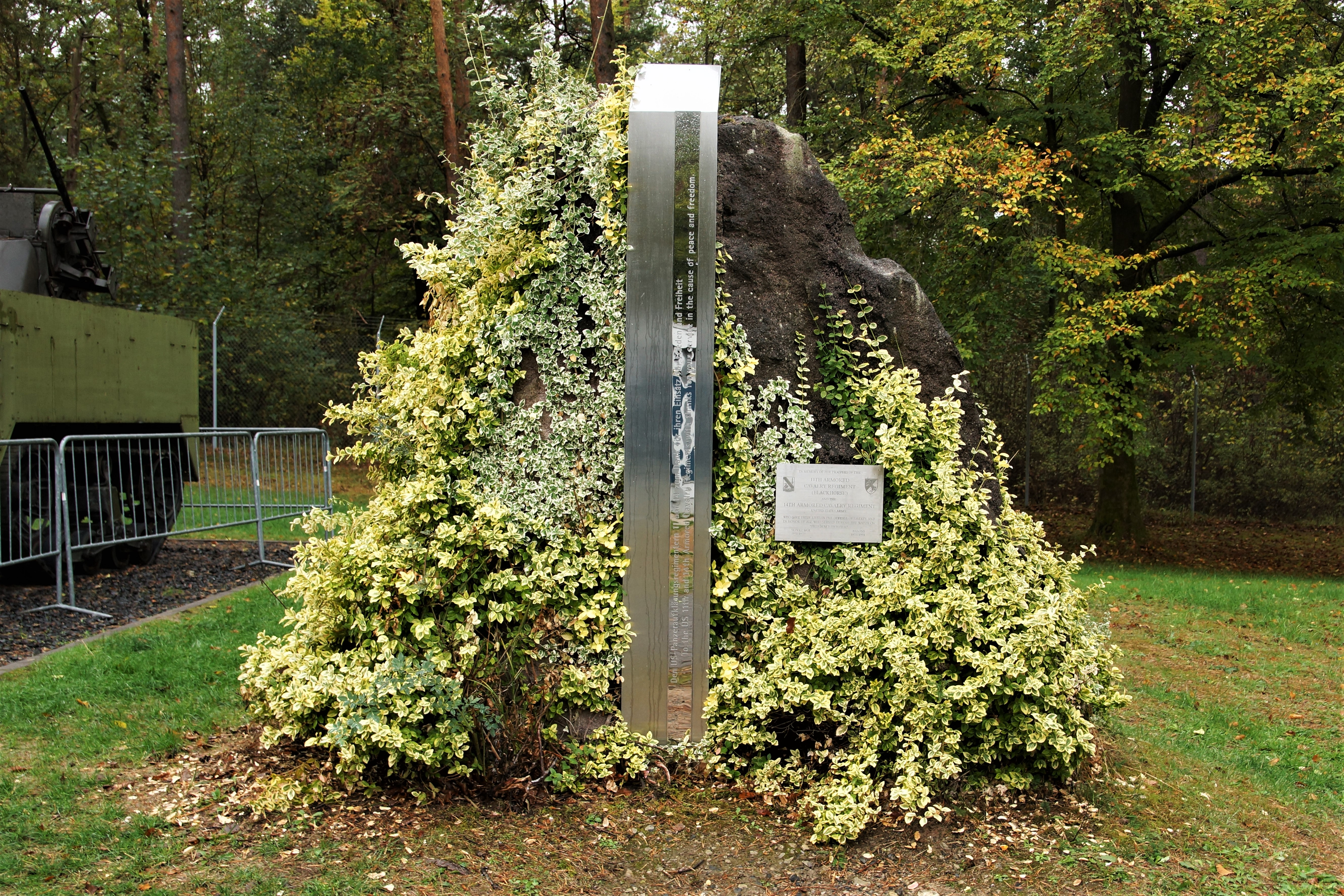
Memorial in Hesse

== See also ==
- Observation Post Alpha
