= Roland A. Chicoine =

American politician

Member of the South Dakota House of Representatives
- In office 1993–2000
- In office 1981–1986

Member of the South Dakota Senate for the 17th district
- In office 1987–1992
- Preceded by: Tim Johnson
- Succeeded by: Roberta Rasmussen

Personal details
- Born: December 10, 1922 Elk Point, South Dakota
- Died: May 19, 2016 (aged 93) Elk Point, South Dakota
- Party: Democratic
- Children: eight
- Profession: farmer

Roland A. Chicoine (December 10, 1922 – May 19, 2016) was an American politician in the state of South Dakota. He was a member of the South Dakota House of Representatives and South Dakota State Senate. A farmer, he was an alumnus of South Dakota State University. He died at the age of 93 in 2016.
