= Ben Nesselhuf =

American politician

Member of the South Dakota Senate from the 17th district
- In office 2005–2011
- Preceded by: John J. Reedy
- Succeeded by: Eldon Nygaard

Personal details
- Born: October 13, 1975 (age 50) Rapid City, South Dakota
- Party: Democratic
- Occupation: insurance agent

Benjamin J. 'BJ, Ben' Nesselhuf is a former Democratic member of the South Dakota Senate, BJ formerly represented the 17th district from 2004 to 2010. Previously he was a member of the South Dakota House of Representatives from 2001 through 2005. He unsuccessfully ran for South Dakota Secretary of State in 2010. He was succeeded in the Senate by Eldon Nygaard.

Party political offices
Vacant Title last held by Kate Looby	Democratic nominee for Secretary of State of South Dakota; 2010	Succeeded by Angelia Schultz
