= Refuel on the move =

In the United States Army, refuel on the move (ROM), is a logistical action, for sustaining an army while on maneuver to reach a destination. A ROM for military vehicles is akin to in-flight refueling for aircraft or UAVs. 'Refuel on the move' would be an essential part of invasion, with one time-honored alternative in Total war being levy of resources (Napoleon's strategy for his invasion of Russia), in this case the fuel of the invaded nation. For the Army, 'refuel on the move' is part of the sustainment planning of the commander, who is responsible for the unit, say a brigade combat team (BCT). In contrast to Napoleon, who led the disastrous invasion in 1812, brigade commanders, their staff, and personnel have a responsibility to ensure that the Sustainment warfighting function is ethically executed.

A forward arming and refueling point (FARP) is a location for a refuel on the move. The refuelling point has to support refueling within a time limit, such as 30 seconds per vehicle, which has tactical consequences for an 87 tank BCT, if it were to be under fire. The converse side, such as the ambush of the 507th Maintenance Company can make headlines for unpreparedness and defeat. (See Military logistics#20th century) A convoy of vehicles on the move will have a pre-planned refueling point at which each vehicle's fuel can be replenished to the 75% level within 30 seconds.

The sustainment personnel conduct a refuel on the move. Sustainment of an Army is an essential part of its forward motion, and the responsibility of its commander. Like a armored division in miniature, an ABCT is capable of independent action; but planning is required by the BCT commander. The senior logistician of the BCT is the brigade support battalion (BSB) commander, who must anticipate the refueling points in an operation. The refueling points can be provided at logistics release points (LRPs): by caches, or by pre-positioned stock, or by fueling convoys, or by aerial delivery. In this case the LRP must leapfrog the armed force in sufficient numbers to serve the invading armed force, and planning and training is required. An Armored brigade combat team ABCT on the move (OTM) is a related concept.

In the twenty-first century, 'contested logistics' is a developing part of the Joint Warfighting Concept.

== See also ==
- Battle of Baghdad (2003) § Thunder_Runs
- Strategy
