= John J. Reedy =

American politician (1927–2022)

Member of the South Dakota House of Representatives
- In office 1991–1996

Member of the South Dakota Senate from the 17th district
- In office 1997–2004
- Preceded by: Roberta Rasmussen
- Succeeded by: Ben Nesselhuf

Personal details
- Born: August 23, 1927 Midland, South Dakota, U.S.
- Died: March 22, 2022 (aged 94)
- Party: Democratic
- Profession: businessman

John J. Reedy (August 23, 1927 – March 22, 2022) was an American politician in the state of South Dakota. He was a member of the South Dakota House of Representatives and South Dakota State Senate. He graduated from Vermillion High School in 1945, and later served in the United States Navy. He also owned a hardware store. He died on March 22, 2022, at the age of 94.
