= List of members of the South Dakota Senate =

These tables are historical listings of state senators who served in the South Dakota Senate from statehood in 1889 until the present.

Key to party colors for the South Dakota Senate
| Democratic | Fusion | Independent | Non-Partisan | Populist | Republican |

== Members of the South Dakota State Senate (1889–1939) ==
45 senators elected from 41 districts. Senators were elected from single-member districts, with five counties each electing two at-large senators. The number of senators was reduced to 43 senators from 1893 to 1899. A 42nd District was added in 1909.

Multi-member at-large districts
| District | Seats | Years | County |
|---|---|---|---|
| 9th | 2 | 1889–1909 | Minnehaha |
| 10th | 2 | 1909–1939 | Minnehaha |
| 30th | 2 | 1889–1893 | Spink |
| 32nd | 2 | 1899–1909 | Day |
| 33rd | 2 | 1909–1939 | Brown |
| 35th | 2 | 1909–1939 | Brown |
| 38th | 2 | 1889–1893; 1899–1909 | Lawrence |
| 39th | 2 | 1909–1939 | Lawrence |

| Senate Session | District | | | | | | | | | | | | | | | | | | | | | | | | | | | | | | | | | | | | | | | | | | | | | | | | | | Senate Session |
| Senate Session | 1st | 2nd | 3rd | 4th | 5th | 6th | 7th | 8th | 9th | | 10th | | 11th | 12th | 13th | 14th | 15th | 16th | 17th | 18th | 19th | 20th | 21st | 22nd | 23rd | 24th | 25th | 26th | 27th | 28th | 29th | 30th | | 31st | 32nd | | 33rd | | 34th | 35th | | 36th | 37th | 38th | | 39th | | 40th | 41st | 42nd | Senate Session |
|---|---|---|---|---|---|---|---|---|---|---|---|---|---|---|---|---|---|---|---|---|---|---|---|---|---|---|---|---|---|---|---|---|---|---|---|---|---|---|---|---|---|---|---|---|---|---|---|---|---|---|---|
| 1st 1889–1890 | Edward Charles Ericson | John Lawlor Jolley | Levi B. French | George W. Snow | H. J. Frank | Vale P. Thielmanm | Casper B. M. Fergen | Frank E. Tomlinson | Alfred Beard Kittredge | J. A. Cooley | J. H. Brown | | Martin E. Conlan | George A. Johnston | W. M. Smith | Joseph M. Greene | Lauritz Hasvold | H. P. Smith | Stiles H. Bronson (Populist) | H. C. Warner | S. F. Huntley | Granville J. Coller | Irving R. Spooner | John Cain | George R. Mason | Coe Isaac Crawford | L. C. Leppelman | C. R. Wescott | Ole H. Ford | William R. Thomas | Carl G. Sherwood | Thomas Sterling | Harry F. Hunter | John S. Proctor | John Norton | | Leander C. Dennis | George W. Miller | Richard Williams | Frank M. Byrne | | Frank M. Hopkins | George Harrison Hoffman | Charles S. Parsons | Frank J. Washabaugh | Alfred Walstein Bangs | | Edward S. Galvin | Alexander S. Stewart | | 1st 1889–1890 |
| 2nd 1891 | Truman M. Stewart | John Lawlor Jolley | Levi B. French | Peter Byrne | W. F. Dunham | Albert L. Peterman | Jacob Schnaidt, Sr. | John Stewart Bean | Alfred Beard Kittredge | Lasse Bothun | Mathew White | | P. F. Wickhem | Harrison C. Preston | John L. Heintz | Lawrence H. Willrodt | Daniel K. Mathews (Populist) | Robert C. Zimmermann | I. L. Burch | H. C. Warner | J. N. Smith | Henry Ingram Stearns | J.C. Crawford | Americus B. Melville | William S. Major (Populist) | Frank Drew | William Austin | David S. Greene | Robert Dixon (Populist) | Mark Wentworth Sheafe, Sr. | J. I. Carrier | William Bird | Frank J. Cory | Z. D. Scott | Duncan McFarlane | | James Henderson Kyle | Burroughs Abbott | Daniel T. Hindman | R. W. Maxwell | | Edward G. Kennedy | Joseph H. Horton | William S. O'Brien | Frank J. Washabaugh | David H. Clark | | John T. Potter | Isaacher Scholfield | | 2nd 1891 |
| 3rd 1893 | Louis Napoleon Crill | Carl Gunderson | Walter Atwood Burleigh | Robert Dollard | Edgar Dean | Isom H. Newby | John Schamber | Benjamin Franklin Fulwider | Charles L. Brockway | James Hart | Charles E. Johnson | | Martin E. Conlan | Charles F. Raymond | A. M. Andrews | Lewis A. Foote | Thomas Fountain | John J. Fitzgerald | John P. Ryan | James Platt Willis | James R. Milliken | John C. Allison | J.C. Crawford | Albert W. Burtt | William S. Major (Populist) | Henry R. Horner | John E. Lawrence | Joseph Hebal | Knudt G. Springen | Joseph C. Miller | David Olney Bennett | William Bird | | Nicholas I. Lowthian | A. C. Roberts | | Francis D. Adams | Samuel A. Kennedy | Peter Berkman | Wesley F. Cattron | | William Edwards | Ellery Channing Chilcott | Sol Star | | Dwight B. Ingram | | James E. Newland | William J. Thornby | | 3rd 1893 |
| 4th 1895 | John E. Sinclair | Ole Oleson, Jr. (Populist) | George Washington Kingsbury | James H. Stephens | Bernard C. Jacobs | Thomas C. Elce | John Schamber | Edwin S. Johnson | Frank L. Boyce | Edley J. Elliott | Charles E. Johnson | | Andrew H. Betts | George A. Schlund (Fusion) | Ole Halverson Storla | Lewis A. Foote | Charles A. Chamberlin | John A. Johnson | L. W. Aldrich | A. P. Doran (Populist) | C. C. Wright (Populist) | John C. Allison | J.C. Crawford | Edward H. Aplin | John W. Schult | Cassius C. Bennett | John E. Lawrence | Joseph Hebal | Knudt G. Springen | Edwin D. Wheelock | David Olney Bennett | William D. Craig | | Nicholas I. Lowthian | John F. Kelley | | Frank G. Brooberg | Charles Allen Howard | Henry Roberts Pease | Darius S. Smith | | James R. Howell | Edward G. Kennedy | William G. Rice | | Levi McGee | | James Monroe Priest | Stephen Eugene Wilson | | 4th 1895 |
| 5th 1897 | Louis Napoleon Crill | Carl Gunderson | Frank D. Wyman | James H. Stephens | Walter H. Wilkinson | A. A. Powers | E. T. Sweet | Willis A. Prather | Cornelius S. Palmer (Fusion) | Lasse Bothun | David C. Morgan (Fusion) | | Elsworth E. King (Fusion) | George A. Schlund (Fusion) | Volkit S. Cook (Fusion) | John S. Stewart (Populist) | Rufus Whealy (Populist) | Michael E. Hart (Fusion) | D. W. Jackson | Seth T. Winslow | Jefferson Sickler (Fusion) | Dudley David | Irwin A. Keith (Fusion) | Henry C. Hinckley (Fusion) | William S. Major (Populist) | Henry R. Horner | Denton B. Thayer | Millard F. Greeley | Lyman Rufus Burlingame | George W. Case | James A. Grant (Fusion) | William D. Craig | | Thomas L. Bouck (Fusion) | Joseph T. Goodwin (Populist) | | Frank W. Webb (Populist) | John C. Kindschy (Populist) | James Ross | John F. Whitlock | | Edward James McGlenn (Fusion) | Ira A. Hatch | John B. Fairbank (Fusion) | | Joseph Peter Buck (Fusion) | | William Bradley | Andrew Jackson Kellar (Fusion) | | 5th 1897 |
| 6th 1899 | William John Bulow | Carl Gunderson | Edward G. Edgerton | George W. Snow | Peder Anthon Overseth | Lawton Willard Cooke | Julius William Ulmer | James Gurnal Jones (Populist) | Albert Harvey Stites | Levi Stone Tyler (Fusion) | William Hoese, Jr. | | Victor K. Stillwell | George A. Johnston | Solomon W. Pease (Fusion) | Jesse Hiatt (Fusion) | Edward Jordan (Populist) | John J. Fitzgerald | D. W. Jackson | Ellis M. Smith | Louis N. Loomis | Charles L. Wohlheter (Fusion) | Thomas Reed | Edwin H. Vance | John M. King (Populist) | Robert W. Stewart | James "Scotty" Philip | William Rohweder | Alef O. Arneson (Populist) | John Baptist Hanten | James A. Grant (Fusion) | Cornelius Wallis Gregory | | Thomas L. Bouck (Fusion) | Edward C. Toy (Populist) | Richard Williams | E. P. Ashford | James Marshall Lawson | Theodore A. Gunnarson | Joseph H. Bottum | | H. G. Boyland | Fred W. Schamber | William S. O'Brien | Henry T. Cooper | Edmund Smith | | Samuel S. Littlefield | Willis E. Benedict | | 6th 1899 |
| 7th 1901 | Frank M. Gilmore | Carl Gunderson | Edward G. Edgerton | Joseph Leach | Peder Anthon Overseth | William H. Stoddard | E. T. Sweet | Homer W. Johnson (Fusion) | Albert Harvey Stites | Carl John Johnson | Henry Van Woert | | Victor K. Stillwell | George A. Johnston | Joseph H. Close | John Wilkes (Fusion) | George H. Few | John H. Williamson | L. J. Martin (Populist) | Alfred B. Rowley | Louis N. Loomis | Philo Hall | Henry Mauch | Edwin H. Vance | Winfield Scott Bell | Robert W. Stewart | Fred S. Rowe | John T. Newby | Andrew Nels Johnson | Charles H. Englesby | Orator Henry LaCraft | Cornelius Wallis Gregory | | Pierce Cahill | Ross E. Parks | Richard Williams | James Marshall Lawson | Frank E. Campbell | John H. Lewis | John F. Whitlock | | A. F. LeClaire | Wilbur F. Varnum | Llewellyn P. Jenkins | Henry T. Cooper | George P. Bennett | | Peter Edwards | John L. Burke | | 7th 1901 |
| 8th 1903 | August Frieberg | Jason Elihu Payne | Charles Hall Dillon | James P. Cooley | Martin E. Rudolph | William H. Stoddard | Julius William Ulmer | Homer W. Johnson (Fusion) | Edgar Burr Northrup | Henry Robertons | Edward Lincoln Abel | | Henry J. Boehmer | O. L. Branson | Joseph H. Close | W. L. Montgomery | George H. Few | John H. Williamson | J. W. Seney | Alfred B. Rowley | Thomas W. Lane | Martin N. Trygstad | Adam Royhl | Fred M. Wilcox | Frank E. Saltmarsh | Cassius C. Bennett | Douglas F. Carlin | John T. Newby | Andrew Nels Johnson | C. A. Neill | Orator Henry LaCraft | R. H. McCaughey | | Pierce Cahill | Edwin R. Thompson | John Edmund McDougall | James Marshall Lawson | William Koepsel | Clement F. Porter | Joseph H. Bottum | | H. G. Boyland | John Stoller | Llewellyn P. Jenkins | James C. Moody | John F. Schrader | | Henry E. Perkins | John L. Burke | | 8th 1903 |
| 9th 1905 | August Frieberg | Jason Elihu Payne | Charles Hall Dillon | James H. Stephens | Charles H. Cassill | William H. Stoddard | John Doering | Edwin Morgan | Edgar Burr Northrup | Henry Robertons | Edward Lincoln Abel | | Edward E. Wagner | O. L. Branson | Willis C. Cook | Oliver P. Cordill (Populist) | George Rice | John Larkins | L. E. McQuillan | George H. Bonney | Robert S. Vessey | C. T. Doughty | Adam Royhl | George Smith Hutchinson | Frank E. Saltmarsh | Howard C. Shober | Warren Young | Andrew B. Anderson (Populist) | Andrew Nels Johnson | C. A. Neill | Clarence E. Hayward | R. H. McCaughey | | C. S. Amsden | Edward C. Toy (Populist) | Richard Williams | James Marshall Lawson | William Koepsel | Lewis S. Hougen | John F. Whitlock | | Mahlon T. Lightner | Charles D. Blanchard | Ernest May | Henry T. Cooper | Myron Willsie | | Samuel G. Mortimer | William F. Hanley | | 9th 1905 |
| 10th 1907 | James T. Scroggs | Orville W. Thompson | Charles Hall Dillon | James P. Cooley | John G. Laxson | James S. Thomson | John Doering | Irving T. Lothrop | John A. Egge | John Henry Mundt | James Smith | | Jacob Schiltz | J. M. Erion | Willis C. Cook | John Smith | James F. Goodsell | E. F. Krueger | H. H. Welch | Robert E. Dowdell | Robert S. Vessey | John C. Jenkins (Populist) | Jacob Johnson | Michael L. Tobin | J. T. McCullen | Ivan Wilbur Goodner | William E. Sweeney | F. H. Greene | Warren Green | Charles H. Englesby | Wallace M. Danforth | David Robertson | | George W. Merry | Samuel A. Bell | William Carpenter | Isaac Lincoln | John R. Weaver | Lewis S. Hougen | Frank M. Byrne | | Eugene Overholser | Fred Hepperle | Ernest May | Henry T. Cooper | Myron Willsie | | Henry E. Perkins | William B. Dudley | | 10th 1907 |
| 11th 1909 | James T. Scroggs | E. D. Hawkins | Charles Hall Dillon | John E. Holleman | John G. Laxson | Charles H. Andrews | William H. Shaw | Frank S. Strohbehn | Alvin M. Shaw | | Charles P. Bates | Gilbert Thoreson | William Hoese | Charles A. Laurson | Herbert Emery Hitchcock | Oliver D. Anderson | A. Williamson | C. H. Jordan | Adrian Nyquist | James F. Goodsell | John A. Johnson | R. H. Williams | Jacob Johnson | Michael L. Tobin | J. T. McCullen | Adolph W. Ewert | Adolph W. Ewert | Andrew J. Lockhart | Alef O. Arneson (Populist) | Charles X. Seward | Wallace M. Danforth | Peter Norbeck | | C. S. Amsden | Earl V. Bobb | | Samuel A. Bell | | Silas S. Yeager | John R. Weaver | Ira O. Curtiss | Frank M. Byrne | B. F. Puckett | Theo Wosnuk | | Donald A. McPherson | Ernest May | Joseph Hare | Oliver O. Stokes | L. E. Highley | 11th 1909 |
| 12th 1911 | John Morrissey | Andrew S. Anderson | Alfred Lee Wyman | James P. Cooley | W. C. Gemmill | Lewis L. Fleeger | John H. Mettler | B. F. Morgan | Bayard T. Boylan | | John E. Pearson | James W. Cone | William Hoese | Wellington J. Maytum | Herbert Emery Hitchcock | Oliver D. Anderson | George Duncan | Harry S. Hedrick | Adrian Nyquist | George Amasa Perley| | John A. Johnson | E. C. Miller| | William F. Brennan | George W. Wright | C. M. Carroll | John J. Dalton | John G. Bartine | Andrew J. Lockhart | Alef O. Arneson (Populist) | Henry Wiersbeck | James D. McKenney | Peter Norbeck | | C. S. Amsden | Anton H. Dahl | | John H. Brooks | | Ross E. Parks | John R. Weaver | Ira O. Curtiss | I. W. A. Collins | George W. Ryan | Andrew Williams | | Donald A. McPherson | Ernest May | Harry Gandy | Henry E. Perkins | Dennis Henault | 12th 1911 |
| 13th 1913 | John Morrissey | Andrew S. Anderson | William H. McMaster | James P. Cooley | Jesse David Hicks | Eric H. Odland | Andreas A. Wipf | B. F. Morgan | Frank J. Fenzl | | Henry Howe | James W. Cone | William Hoese | Ellis M. Smith | Gustav H. Helgerson | Ray J. Murphy | John G. Bartine | Thomas L. White | Ernest O. Patterson | Robert E. Dailey | Basil B. Bowell | E. C. Miller| | David Paterson | George W. Wright | C. M. Carroll | John J. Dalton | E. A. Morrison | J. L. Brown | Thomas James Law | Hans Martin Finnerud | Thomas H. Bickel | Peter Norbeck | | C. S. Amsden | Andrew Marvick | | John H. Brooks | | Donald C. McLean | C. A. Russell | Edwin Jones Mather | John F. Whitlock | John W. Harris | J. H. Fischer | | Alex Arthur Moodie | Ernest May | Moritz Adelbert Lange | John D. Hale | John F. Parks | 13th 1913 |
| 14th 1915 | E. W. Ericson | Andrew S. Anderson | William H. McMaster | Theodore Berndt | Albert Joseph Kuhns | Eric H. Odland | John Wallace Peckham | Weldon F. Brooks | John E. Morris | | John E. Pearson | Thomas McKinnon | Walter E. Van Demark | Charles A. Laurson | Clyde S. Bobb | John C. Stoner | Alfred Zoske | Jacob E. Ziebach | O. J. Lundly | Robert E. Dailey | Hans Urdahl | E. C. Miller| | David Paterson | O. S. Hagen | Glen M. Waters | Louis L. Stephens | William H. Frost | William H. McClintock | Winfred E. Whittemore | Mark Wentworth Sheafe, Jr. | Thomas H. Bickel | Charles Edward Stutenroth | | C. S. Amsden | Andrew Marvick | | David L. Printup | | Donald C. McLean | Isaac Lincoln | John L. Browne | John F. Whitlock | M. Plin Beebe | George Brooke Howell | | Robert C. Hayes | Ernest May | Frederick Bailey Stiles | John D. Hale | Frederick E. Walker | 14th 1915 |
| 15th 1917 | E. W. Ericson | Carl Gunderson | Thomas J. Frick | James H. Stephens | Albert Joseph Kuhns | Eric H. Odland | John Wallace Peckham | Weldon F. Brooks | Edwin Peck Wanzer | | Andrew L. Berg | John E. Pearson | Frank D. Peckham | Robert E. Dowdell | Charles Boreson | Gideon G. Glendinning | John M. Johnson | Henry P. Will | Sigel D. Sharp | Robert E. Dailey | Hans Urdahl | Martin G. Carlisle | Charles A. Alseth | William Washington Howes | Glen M. Waters | Grailey H. Jaynes | William H. Frost | William H. McClintock | Winfred E. Whittemore | John Carlyle Southwick | George Lindland | R. W. Labrie | | C. S. Amsden | Andrew Marvick | | Carl J. Mohn | | Donald C. McLean | Isaac Lincoln | Jay Edward Reeves | A. M. Moore | F. J. Milliman | John Rossow | | Theorus R. Stoner | David R. Evans | W. F. Haafke | John D. Hale | David Anderson | 15th 1917 |
| 16th 1919 | E. W. Ericson | William Oscar Knight | Carl G. Kjeldseth | James H. Stephens | Robert Otto Schaber | Eric H. Odland | P. P. Kleinsasser | Weldon F. Brooks | John B. Tripp | | George Jonathan Danforth | John E. Pearson | B. F. Myers | M. D. Eide | Charles Boreson | Frank A. Finch | Henry P. Will | Harold Gunvordahl | Allen L. Horsfall | Hans Urdahl | Martin G. Carlisle | Charles A. Alseth | Edgar James Miller | Charles W. Gardner | Grailey H. Jaynes | Edgar Watwood | John M. Johnson | Hyatt E. Covey | Arthur W. Bartels | John Carlyle Southwick | James Montgomery Johnston | R. W. Labrie | | C. S. Amsden | Ole Peter John Engstrom | | Carl J. Mohn | | William Garner Waddel | Isaac Lincoln | William M. Scott | A. M. Moore | John F. Comstock | John Joseph Hepperle | | Theorus R. Stoner | J. C. Milne | George P. Bennett | Charles Ham | Percy H. Helm | 16th 1919 |
| 17th 1921 | E. W. Ericson | William Oscar Knight | Carl G. Kjeldseth | James A. Wagner | Robert Otto Schaber | Joseph Swenson | P. P. Kleinsasser | Jacob W. Eggers | F. E. Van Zee | | George Jonathan Danforth | Andrew L. Berg | B. F. Myers | M. D. Eide | Charles Boreson | George O. Sletten | Henry P. Will | Harold Gunvordahl | Allen L. Horsfall | F. W. Schultz | John A. Lunden | Charles A. Alseth | Irving R. Crawford | Charles W. Gardner | Harry Thomas Kenney | J. D. Morrison | Arthur L. Freelove | Hyatt E. Covey | Arthur W. Bartels | Arthur L. Sherin | James Montgomery Johnston | A. Loomis | | C. S. Amsden | Ole Peter John Engstrom | | George F. Anderson | | William Garner Waddel | Isaac Lincoln | William M. Scott | John J Mertens | John A. Koch | F. W. Schirber | | Theorus R. Stoner | Frank R. Cock | George P. Bennett | Carroll D. Erskine | William A. Guilfoyle | 17th 1921 |
| 18th 1923 | John B. Johnson | John Frieberg | Charles B. Freney | James A. Wagner | Carl F. Tank | Alan Bogue, Jr. | William Bartling | Jacob W. Eggers | Lewis John Larson | | Harry Franklin Brownell | Eric J. Ellefson | Wellington J. Maytum | Frank Hoy | Lauritz Miller | George O. Sletten | Ellsworth E. Dye | Edward Henry Everson | Lewis Benson | L. G. Atherton | John A. Lunden | Charles A. Alseth | Irving R. Crawford | Frank R. Fisher | Glenn W. Martens | Charles W. Robertson | Edgar C. Hall | Hyatt E. Covey | Warren Green | Henry Adam Wagner | Elmer William Anderson | A. Loomis | | C. S. Amsden | Stephen Henderson | | Otto L. Kaas | | Jacob O. Wickre | George Brooke Howell | Dwight Campbell | John J Mertens | John A. Koch | W. K. Bishop | | Alex Arthur Moodie | Frank R. Cock | George P. Bennett | Carroll D. Erskine | William Robert Woods | 18th 1923 |
| 19th 1925 | John B. Johnson | Charles J. Gunderson | Charles B. Freney | John R. Kirk | Verne C. Kennedy | Alan Bogue, Jr. | Warren Dimock | Frank Joseph Rubertus | Lewis John Larson | | Theodore Mead Bailey | Jacob B. Severson | Fred Litz | Robert E. Dowdell | Lauritz Miller | Daniel Reese Perkins | John Quinn Anderson | Edward Henry Everson | Lewis Benson | L. G. Atherton | John A. Lunden | Peter H. Schultz | Dick Haney | David A. Erwin | Clinton J. Crandall, Jr. | Odell K. Whitney | Chauncey T. Bates | Hyatt E. Covey | Warren Green | Henry Adam Wagner | Elmer William Anderson | William F. Bruell | | C. S. Amsden | Stephen Henderson | | F. Emmett Sayer | | A. T. H. Bosland | George Brooke Howell | Hugh Agor | Frank Cundill | S. J. Hagg | Edward C. Slocum | | Alex Arthur Moodie | Leonard M. Simons | Isaac H. Chase | Carroll D. Erskine | Leonard W. March | 19th 1925 |
| 20th 1927 | Ole Lawrence | Andrew B. Gunderson | Charles B. Freney | Henry Brown | Jesse David Hicks | Robert "Verne" Rayburn | Warren Dimock | Frank Joseph Rubertus | Lewis John Larson | | Charles S. McDonald | A. N. Brudvig | Wellington J. Maytum | Robert E. Dowdell | Herbert S. Barnard | Daniel Reese Perkins | Joe Atkins | Edward Prchal | Gregory F. Meyers | Ira F. Blewitt | Carl O. Trygstad | Emil Loriks | James McNamara | David A. Erwin | Clinton J. Crandall, Jr. | Odell K. Whitney | Jorgen J. Boe | Frank T. Fetzner | Peter Sorenson | George H. Taecker | George C. Berry | Fred A. Reinecke | | C. S. Amsden | O. K. Sather | | F. Emmett Sayer | | A. T. H. Bosland | George Brooke Howell | William L. Buttz | Frank Cundill | S. J. Hagg | Theodore J. P. Giedt | | Alex Arthur Moodie | Leonard M. Simons | Joseph L. Robbins | Carroll D. Erskine | Stephen E. Ainslie | 20th 1927 |
| 21st 1929 | Ole Lawrence | Andrew B. Gunderson | Charles B. Freney | C. N. McCollum | Jesse David Hicks | Andrew Stenson Bogue | John Chris Graber | Francis W. Jones | Lewis John Larson | | Ralph Winfield Parliman, Sr. | William Cornwall Nisbet | William Wallace Moyes | W. A. Anderson | Henry Emery Hitchcock | George O. Sletten | Joe Atkins | William Sinkular | Hugh H. Stokes | W. H. Farmer | Carl O. Trygstad | J. L. Barber | S. D. Disrud | William C. Hermann | Charles Lee Hyde | Odell K. Whitney | Jorgen J. Boe | Frank T. Fetzner | Peter Sorenson | George H. Taecker | George C. Berry | Carl Otto Johnson | | Robert Hunter | O. K. Sather | | Harold W. King | | Mancel W. Peterson | George Brooke Howell | William L. Buttz | I. J. McGinity | A. F. Miles | Martin Ingval Larsen | | Alex Arthur Moodie | Leonard M. Simons | John A. Boland | George McFarland | L. E. Highley | 21st 1929 |
| 22nd 1931 | James Fedderson | Wilfred L. Chaussee | Henry K. Warren | James Kirk, Jr. | Charles Herbert Fitch | Andrew Stenson Bogue | John J. Wipf | Walter H. Frei | Lewis John Larson | | Richard A. Bielski | Claus F. Eggers | Lawrence G. France | Robert E. Dowdell | J. S. Harkness | William R. Gardner | Joe Atkins | William Sinkular | Hugh H. Stokes | W. H. Farmer | Herman C. Halvorson | Carl Emil Loriks | Earl P. Flowers | William C. Hermann | Charles Lee Hyde | E. G. Wilkinson | J. B. Hartz | Frank T. Fetzner | Benjamin U. Hestad | Warren Welch | L. J. Odland | Carl Otto Johnson | | Robert Hunter | O. K. Sather | | Harold W. King | | Mancel W. Peterson | Maurice Carpenter | George C. Ernst | J. P. Shirk | A. F. Miles | Theodore J. P. Giedt | | Alex Arthur Moodie | Leonard M. Simons | John A. Boland | George McFarland | L. E. Highley | 22nd 1931 |
| 23rd 1933 | James Fedderson | Wilfred L. Chaussee | Samuel G. Gilliland | James Kirk, Jr. | Albert O. Helvig | Roy B. Nelson | Franklin Issenhuth | Gus F. Buche | Lewis John Larson | | Amund P. Amundson | Roy D. Burns | Louverne Joseph Ballou | Earl Milham Mumford | James Edwin Williams | William R. Gardner | Earl R. Slifer | William Sinkular | Herman D. Eilers | Hans Urdahl | Herman C. Halvorson | Carl Emil Loriks | Earl P. Flowers | James M. Magness | Edwin DeLos Sutton | Ralph V. Milstead | Erwin Blum | C. M. Barton | Benjamin U. Hestad | Warren Welch | Edward H. Baldwin | F. G. Haven | | Christ Christian | Fred Evander | | Otto L. Kaas | | Mancel W. Peterson | Maurice Carpenter | George C. Ernst | J. P. Shirk | Nathaniel Nickisch | Edward C. Slocum | | John A. Bertolero | Leonard M. Simons | John A. Boland | Cabell Hale | William A. Nevin | 23rd 1933 |
| 24th 1935 | James Fedderson | Wilfred L. Chaussee | Edward Schneider (politician) | Joseph G. Vaith | Albert O. Helvig | Roy B. Nelson | William F. D. Ackerman | Gus F. Buche | Frank R. Schroder | | Amund P. Amundson | Hans Hanson | Louverne Joseph Ballou | Earl Milham Mumford | John H. Hammer | William R. Gardner | George Abild | William Sinkular | Herman D. Eilers | E. W. Goldman | Carl O. Trygstad | L. A. Johnson | Carl H. Weir | Elmer A. Beck | Edwin DeLos Sutton | Mike Feeney | Erwin Blum | C. M. Barton | Ole T. Olson | Warren Welch | Edward H. Baldwin | F. G. Haven | | Christ Christian | Stephen Henderson | | W. E. Bush | | Mancel W. Peterson | Maurice Carpenter | George C. Ernst | Charles A. McMurray | Nathaniel Nickisch | Edward C. Slocum | | Dwight Casner | Leonard M. Simons | John A. Boland | Cabell Hale | William A. Nevin | 24th 1935 |
| 25th 1937 | James Fedderson | Frank M. Olds | Edward Schneider (politician) | Joseph G. Vaith | Clarence H. Johnson | M. V. Olsen | David J. Tiede | Ralph N. James | John S. Conover | | Albert R. Risty | Blaine Simons | Archie Willis Odell | Fred L. Ferguson | John H. Hammer | Marion Barrett | Jacob E. Ziebach | George M. Bradshaw | O. H. Hove | Carl A. Stensland | Carl O. Trygstad | L. A. Johnson | Carl H. Weir | Elmer A. Beck | John Thomas Holst | Mike Feeney | C. J. Wilson | James B. Painter | Ole T. Olson | Warren Welch | Alfred Olson | F. G. Haven | | Henry W. Seide | Stephen Henderson | | W. E. Bush | | Mancel W. Peterson | August Dahme | Frank J. McHugh | K. J. Morgan | Nathaniel Nickisch | Paul O. Kretschmar | | Kenneth C. Kellar | Leonard M. Simons | Jessie E. Sanders | Harry Blair | R. A. Hummel | 25th 1937 |
| Senate Session | 1st | 2nd | 3rd | 4th | 5th | 6th | 7th | 8th | 9th | | 10th | | 11th | 12th | 13th | 14th | 15th | 16th | 17th | 18th | 19th | 20th | 21st | 22nd | 23rd | 24th | 25th | 26th | 27th | 28th | 29th | 30th | | 31st | 32nd | | 33rd | | 34th | 35th | | 36th | 37th | 38th | | 39th | | 40th | 41st | 42nd | Senate Session |
| Senate Session | District | | | | | | | | | | | | | | | | | | | | | | | | | | | | | | | | | | | | | | | | | | | | | | | | | | Senate Session |

== Members of the South Dakota State Senate (1939–1967) ==
35 senators elected from 33 districts. Three counties each elected two at-large senators.

Multi-member at-large districts
| District | Seats | Years | County |
|---|---|---|---|
| 7th | 2 | 1939–1967 | Minnehaha |
| 22nd | 2 | 1939–1961 | Brown |
| 28th | 2 | 1963–1967 | Pennington |

| Senate Session | District | | | | | | | | | | | | | | | | | | | | | | | | | | | | | | | | | | | | Senate Session |
| Senate Session | 1st | 2nd | 3rd | 4th | 5th | 6th | 7th | | 8th | 9th | 10th | 11th | 12th | 13th | 14th | 15th | 16th | 17th | 18th | 19th | 20th | 21st | 22nd | | 23rd | 24th | 25th | 26th | 27th | 28th | | 29th | 30th | 31st | 32nd | 33rd | Senate Session |
|---|---|---|---|---|---|---|---|---|---|---|---|---|---|---|---|---|---|---|---|---|---|---|---|---|---|---|---|---|---|---|---|---|---|---|---|---|---|
| 26th 1939 | Frank M. Olds | M. P. Ohlman | Frank Nash | David J. Tiede | John J. Gering | Clarence H. Johnson | Albert R. Risty | Sioux K. Grigsby | Archie Willis Odell | Andrew Ellwein | Leo D. Heck | Fred L. Ferguson | Carl A. Stensland | Arthur S. Mitchell | L. A. Johnson | Carl H. Weir | Elmer A. Beck | Elmer C. Graves | Ed T. Elkins | Henry W. Seide | E. L. Stavig | M. H. Monson | Frank J. McHugh | August Dahme | Chester E. Solomonson | K. J. Morgan | George M. Bradshaw | E. E. Morford | John E. Mueller, Jr. | Charles S. Reed | | C. J. Wilson | Ellis Yarnal Berry | Leonard M. Simons | Marion Barrett | Kenneth C. Kellar | 26th 1939 |
| 27th 1941 | Irwin R. Erickson | M. P. Ohlman | Frank Nash | David J. Tiede | Martin V. Olsen | Adolph Nelson | Albert R. Risty | Sioux K. Grigsby | John Buehler | Henry J. Oster | Leo D. Heck | Arthur N. Hanson | O. J. Tommeraason | Arthur S. Mitchell | Harold Orrin Lovre | Carl H. Weir | Elmer A. Beck | Elmer C. Graves | Ed T. Elkins | Elmer G. Knight | E. L. Stavig | Oral Burwain Light | George C. Ernst | August Dahme | Paul O. Kretschmar | William J. Jacobs | R. D. Albaugh | E. E. Morford | William A. Nevin | Charles S. Reed | | Rex Terry | Ellis Yarnal Berry | W. F. Thomas | Marion Barrett | Alfred D. Roesler | 27th 1941 |
| 28th 1943 | Donald W. Beaty | M. P. Ohlman | Merton E. Neubauer | David J. Tiede | Martin V. Olsen | Adolph Nelson | Albert R. Risty | Sioux K. Grigsby | John Buehler | Henry J. Oster | Leo D. Heck | Peter Gudahl | O. J. Tommeraason | Frank L. Messner | Harold Orrin Lovre | Carl H. Weir | Elmer A. Beck | Elmer C. Graves | Ed T. Elkins | Elmer G. Knight | E. L. Stavig | Harry W. Nelson | George C. Ernst | August Dahme | Emil Sonnenfeld | William J. Jacobs | R. D. Albaugh | Chris Dam | William A. Nevin | Charles S. Reed | | Rex Terry | Matt Stephenson | W. F. Thomas | V. D. Tidball | Alfred D. Roesler | 28th 1943 |
| 29th 1945 | Donald W. Beaty | M. P. Ohlman | Merton E. Neubauer | David J. Tiede | Martin V. Olsen | Robert Otto Schaber | Albert R. Risty | W.T. Knudtson | Rexord M. Sheild | M. E. Helgerson | Ernest H. Wood | Peter Gudahl | Jerry Henry Lammers | Frank L. Messner | Harold Golseth | John Longstaff | Otto B. Linstad | Arthur L. Coleman | Ed T. Elkins | Bernard E. Berg | E. L. Stavig | Harry W. Nelson | Melvin A. Nelson | Elmer R. Judy | Chester E. Solomonson | Ernest H. Noteboom | R. D. Albaugh | Chris Dam | George W. Tubbs | Charles S. Reed | | Rex Terry | Matt Stephenson | W. F. Thomas | V. D. Tidball | Alfred D. Roesler | 29th 1945 |
| 30th 1947 | Donald W. Beaty | W. H. Baggs | William A. Poelstra | William Schenk | Martin V. Olsen | Lafe A. Lunder | Albert R. Risty | Art B. Anderson | Rexord M. Sheild | L. C. Helgerson | Charles R. Hatch | D.H. Brewster | Jerry Henry Lammers | Irwin J. Bibby | Harold Golseth | H. R. Costain | Otto B. Linstad | Arthur L. Coleman | Ed T. Elkins | Bernard E. Berg | E. L. Stavig | Oral Burwain Light | J. G. Barger | Elmer R. Judy | O. B. Just | Ernest H. Noteboom | Julius Thoene | C. F. Manson | George W. Tubbs | Charles S. Reed | | Rex Terry | O. J. Fett | W. F. Thomas | L. M. Larson | Alfred D. Roesler | 30th 1947 |
| 31st 1949 | C. O. Peterson | W. H. Baggs | Joe E. Lehmann | William Schenk | Joseph Conrad Jensen | Lafe A. Lunder | Albert R. Risty | Arthur feeney | Charles Bruett | Henry J. Oster | Donald J. Stransky | D.H. Brewster | Jerry Henry Lammers | Irwin J. Bibby | Edwin Severine Johnson | Harold C. Ristow | Fred R. Winans | Arthur L. Coleman | Ed T. Elkins | Elmer G. Knight | Peter J. Weckman | Oral Burwain Light | George C. Ernst | Abraham Pred | Raymond Hieb | L. R. "Roy" Houck | Thomas A. Laprath | Alex Olson | Francis E. Manning | Boyd Stewart Leedom | | Edwin G. Roller | Emory A. Booth | W. F. Thomas | L. M. Larson | Alfred D. Roesler | 31st 1949 |
| 32nd 1951 | C. O. Peterson | W. H. Baggs | Joe E. Lehmann | William Schenk | Joseph Conrad Jensen | Lafe A. Lunder | Albert R. Risty | Art B. Anderson | Charles Bruett | Henry J. Oster | Donald J. Stransky | Frank A. Ferguson | Jerry Henry Lammers | Ray E. Barnett | Edwin Severine Johnson | Richard M. Pease | Fred R. Winans | Arthur L. Coleman | Ed T. Elkins | Elmer G. Knight | Jewett J. Johnson | Arthur W. Jones | Ralph Herseth | Abraham Pred | Chester E. Solomonson | L. R. "Roy" Houck | L.E. Goodwin | Alex Olson | Francis E. Manning | John T. Vucurevich | | Carman H. Sutley | Scott C. Hatch | W. F. Thomas | Earl V. Morrill | Alfred D. Roesler | 32nd 1951 |
| 33rd 1953 | C. O. Peterson | Chester W. Stewart | David L. Wickens | William Schenk | Joseph Conrad Jensen | Lafe A. Lunder | Albert R. Risty | Art B. Anderson | Rexford M. Sheild | Damon Clark | L. W. Barns | Frank A. Ferguson | LeRoy F. Ericsson | Ray E. Barnett | Harold Golseth | Richard M. Pease | Lee Warne | Arthur L. Coleman | Ed T. Elkins | Bernard E. Berg | Jewett J. Johnson | Oral Burwain Light | Archie A. Bolduan | Carl Wolter | Foster C. Shankland | L. R. "Roy" Houck | L.E. Goodwin | Alex Olson | John E. Mueller, Jr. | John T. Vucurevich | | Carman H. Sutley | Scott C. Hatch | W. F. Thomas | Earl V. Morrill | Alfred D. Roesler | 33rd 1953 |
| 34th 1955 | C. O. Peterson | Chester W. Stewart | Joe E. Lehmann | Marvin T. Gilbertson | Joseph Conrad Jensen | Hilbert David Bogue | Albert R. Risty | Art B. Anderson | Rexford M. Sheild | Henry J. Oster | Donald J. Stransky | Frank A. Ferguson | LeRoy F. Ericsson | Ray E. Barnett | Harold Golseth | Millard G. Scott | Lee Warne | Roy O. Hurlbert | Vince E. Halverson | Bernard E. Berg | Henry I. Knudsen | Arthur W. Jones | Archie A. Bolduan | Ralph Herseth | Raymond Hieb | L. A. Melby | Louell Louis Lillibridge | James Ramey | John E. Mueller, Jr. | John T. Vucurevich | | Carman H. Sutley | Fred J. Hunter | L. A. Johnson | L. M. Larson | Alfred D. Roesler | 34th 1955 |
| 35th 1957 | C. O. Peterson | Chester W. Stewart | Joe E. Lehmann | Robert William Hirsch | C. T. 'Corney' DeNeui | Hilbert David Bogue | Hugh M. Robinson | Art B. Anderson | A.G. Sievers | Henry J. Oster | Donald J. Stransky | Hagen Kelsey | O.J. Tommeraason | C. E. Anderson | Walter K. Johnson | Carroll Fullerton | Herbert A. Heidepriem | Lloyd M. Riddle | C. L. Chase | Harry Christians | Henry I. Knudsen | Arthur W. Jones | Robert A. Johnson | Edward H. Downs | John Riedlinger, Jr. | Fred E. Bartels | Thomas A. Laprath | James Ramey | Francis E. Manning | E. C. "Ping" Murray | | James Abdnor | Fred J. Hunter | F.B. "Bob" Roberts | J. F. "Fritz" Kammerer | Alfred D. Roesler | 35th 1957 |
| 36th 1959 | Herman Jacobs | James M. Lloyd | Joe E. Lehmann | Robert William Hirsch | Lloyd Schrag | Hilbert David Bogue | Walter Vincent Nordstrom | Art B. Anderson | A.G. Sievers | Henry J. Oster | Donald J. Stransky | Hagen Kelsey | Ernie M. Fredrickson | Burdette Shelden | Walter K. Johnson | Carroll Fullerton | Herbert A. Heidepriem | Morgan Tollefson | C. L. Chase | Harry Christians | Henry I. Knudsen | Arthur W. Jones | Robert A. Johnson | Edward H. Downs | John Riedlinger, Jr. | Fred E. Bartels | Thomas A. Laprath | James Ramey | Francis E. Manning | E. C. "Ping" Murray | | James Abdnor | Archie R. Moore | F.B. "Bob" Roberts | Olin Marion Matkins | Alfred D. Roesler | 36th 1959 |
| 37th 1961 | Herman Jacobs | James M. Lloyd | Wilbur Foss | Robert William Hirsch | Lloyd Schrag | Hilbert David Bogue | Walter Vincent Nordstrom | Art B. Anderson | Charles Bruett | Henry J. Oster | Lars Gjesdal | Hagen Kelsey | William R. Arneson | Ray E. Barnett | Fred H. Haufschild | Frank L. Hafner | Louis A. Pottratz | Lawrence E. Kayl | C. L. Chase | Arthur E. Engelbrecht | Henry I. Knudsen | Arthur W. Jones | Robert A. Johnson | Edward H. Downs | Andrew Stoebner | Fred E. Bartels | Lloyd E. Blomstrom | James Ramey | John E. Mueller, Jr. | E. C. "Ping" Murray | | James Abdnor | Archie R. Moore | F.B. "Bob" Roberts | George B. McFarland | Alfred D. Roesler | 37th 1961 |
| 38th-39th 1963–64 | John T. Sanger | James M. Lloyd | Rayburn R. Rueb | Robert William Hirsch | Lloyd Schrag | Neal A. Strand | Walter Vincent Nordstrom | Art B. Anderson | Charles Bruett | Henry J. Oster | Ed C. Sorensen | Herbert A. Willoughby | William R. Arneson | Gordon Mydland | Fred H. Haufschild | George Blue | Louis A. Pottratz | Lawrence E. Kayl | Joel "Joe" Leathers | Arthur E. Engelbrecht | Henry I. Knudsen | Arthur W. Jones | Edward H. Downs | | Andrew Stoebner | Herbert A. Heidepriem | Lloyd E. Blomstrom | James Ramey | John E. Mueller, Jr. | Hoadley Dean | E. C. "Ping" Murray | James Abdnor | Clarence E. "Swede" Boehrs | Lem Overpeck | Dale A. Davis | Alfred D. Roesler | 38th-39th 1963–64 |
| 40th-41st 1965–66 | John F. Murphy | Dan Stuelpnagel | Frank Novotny | Robert William Hirsch | Lloyd Schrag | Neal A. Strand | Walter Vincent Nordstrom | Art B. Anderson | Richard F. Kneip | Ed Herbst | Ed C. Sorensen | Merwyn H. Walter | Robert Dailey, Jr. | Gordon Mydland | Oscar L. Anderson | George Blue | Fawn Pashby | Wilmont M. "Bill" Uecker | G. Robert Bartron | Louis L. "Roy" Johnson | Henry I. Knudsen | Arthur W. Jones | Allen R. Sperry | | Ervin E. Dupper | Herbert A. Heidepriem | H. Ivan Nelson | Richard W. Hodson | Carl E. Boe | Frank E. Henderson | Harold D. Buckingham | James Abdnor | Clarence E. "Swede" Boehrs | Alfred J. Burke | N. F. "Red Lyon" | Alfred D. Roesler | 40th-41st 1965–66 |
| Senate Session | 1st | 2nd | 3rd | 4th | 5th | 6th | 7th | | 8th | 9th | 10th | 11th | 12th | 13th | 14th | 15th | 16th | 17th | 18th | 19th | 20th | 21st | 22nd | | 23rd | 24th | 25th | 26th | 27th | 28th | | 29th | 30th | 31st | 32nd | 33rd | Senate Session |
| Senate Session | District | | | | | | | | | | | | | | | | | | | | | | | | | | | | | | | | | | | | Senate Session |

== Members of the South Dakota State Senate (1967-Present) ==
35 senators elected from 35 single-member districts. From 1967 to 1973, there were only 29 districts, with three counties each electing more than one at-large member. District 29 was eliminated from 1973 to 1985, when it became District 11's fifth at-large seat. In 1985, all remaining multi-member districts were eliminated, establishing the current 35 single-member districts.

Multi-member at-large districts
| District | Seats | Years | County |
|---|---|---|---|
| 2nd | 2 | 1967–1985 | Brown |
| 11th | 4 | 1967–1973 | Minnehaha |
| 11th | 5 | 1973–1985 | Minnehaha |
| 28th | 3 | 1967–1973 | Pennington |
| 27th | 3 | 1973–1985 | Pennington |

| Senate Session | District | | | | | | | | | | | | | | | | | | | | | | | | | | | | | | | | | | | | | | | | | | | | Senate Session |
| Senate Session | 1st | 2nd | | 3rd | 4th | 5th | 6th | 7th | 8th | 9th | 10th | 11th | | | | | 12th | 13th | 14th | 15th | 16th | 17th | 18th | 19th | 20th | 21st | 22nd | 23rd | 24th | 25th | 26th | 27th | | | 28th | | | 29th | 30th | 31st | 32nd | 33rd | 34th | 35th | Senate Session |
|---|---|---|---|---|---|---|---|---|---|---|---|---|---|---|---|---|---|---|---|---|---|---|---|---|---|---|---|---|---|---|---|---|---|---|---|---|---|---|---|---|---|---|---|---|---|
| 42nd-43rd 1967–68 | Arthur W. Jones | E. C. Pieplow | Harland C. Clark | Louis L. "Roy" Johnson | G. Robert Bartron | John B. Foster | Gordon J. Mydland | Henry A. Poppen | Leland L. Steele | Richard Francis Kneip | Norval Gullickson | Art B. Anderson | Walter Vincent Nordstrom | Frank Gibbs | Holger Anderson | | Neal A Strand | Lloyd Schrag | Robert William Hirsch | Alvin J. "Hap" Rhian | Frank Novotny | F. Wayne Unzicker | Harold B. Willrodt | Herbert A. Heidepriem | George W. Fillbach | Ervin E. Dupper | William Lane Grams | Carl Theodore Fischer | James Abdnor | R. C. "Randy" Stenson | Clell D. Elwood | Alfred D. Roesler | | | Carl T. Burgess | Arthur L. Jones | Bill Hustead | Alfred J. Burke | Districts 30-35 re-established in 1985 | | | | | | 42nd-43rd 1967–68 |
| 44th-45th 1969–70 | Arthur W. Jones | E. C. Pieplow | Allen Sperry | Louis L. "Roy" Johnson | G. Robert Bartron | Wilmont M. "Bill" Uecker | Paul E. Brown | Henry A. Poppen | Leland L. Steele | Richard Francis Kneip | Norval Gullickson | Art B. Anderson | Henry T. Quinn | Frank Gibbs | Holger Anderson | | Wendell Eugene Leafstedt | Lloyd Schrag | William R. Ripp | Alvin J. "Hap" Rhian | Frank Novotny | A. A. "Joe" Quintal | Harold B. Willrodt | Harvey L. Wollman | George W. Fillbach | A. W. Spiry | William Lane Grams | Carl Theodore Fischer | Robert H. Burns | R. C. "Randy" Stenson | Kenneth A. Trask | Joe R. Dunmire | | | Frank E. Henderson | Arthur L. Jones | Kenneth L. Roberts | Alfred J. Burke | Districts 30-35 re-established in 1985 | | | | | | 44th-45th 1969–70 |
| 46th-47th 1971–72 | Curtis Jones | E. C. Pieplow | Allen Sperry | Louis L. "Roy" Johnson | Thomas J. Green | Wilmont M. "Bill" Uecker | Paul E. Brown | Henry A. Poppen | Leland L. Steele | Rodney M. Hall | Harold D. Schreier | Oscar Austad | Henry T. Quinn | Thomas P. Mills | Holger Anderson | | Robert T. Collingwood | Lloyd Schrag | William R. Ripp | Don A. Bierle | Frank Novotny | A. A. "Joe" Quintal | Robert "Bob" Miller | Harvey L. Wollman | Eldon L. Smith | A. W. Spiry | William Lane Grams | G. Homer Harding | Robert H. Burns | John P. "Pat" Flynn | Kenneth A. Trask | Joe R. Dunmire | | | Franklin Jay Wallahan | Charles E. Donnelly, Jr. | Homer Kandaras | Alfred J. Burke | Districts 30-35 re-established in 1985 | | | | | | 46th-47th 1971–72 |
| 46th-47th 1971–72 | Curtis Jones | E. C. Pieplow | Allen Sperry | Louis L. "Roy" Johnson | Thomas J. Green | Wilmont M. "Bill" Uecker | Paul E. Brown | Henry A. Poppen | Leland L. Steele | Rodney M. Hall | Harold D. Schreier | Oscar Austad | Henry T. Quinn | Thomas P. Mills | Holger Anderson | | Robert T. Collingwood | Lloyd Schrag | William R. Ripp | Don A. Bierle | Frank Novotny | A. A. "Joe" Quintal | Robert "Bob" Miller | Harvey L. Wollman | Jacob Kunstle | A. W. Spiry | William Lane Grams | G. Homer Harding | Robert H. Burns | John P. "Pat" Flynn | Kenneth A. Trask | Joe R. Dunmire | | | Grace Mickelson | Charles E. Donnelly, Jr. | Homer Kandaras | Alfred J. Burke | Districts 30-35 re-established in 1985 | | | | | | 46th-47th 1971–72 |
| 48th-49th 1973–74 | Curtis Jones | E. C. Pieplow | Allen Sperry | Arlo Leddy | Jacob J. Krull, Jr. | Harvey L. Wollman | Paul E. Brown | Henry A. Poppen | Jack Jackson | Rodney M. Hall | Harold D. Schreier | Oscar Austad | Jerome Mayer | Thomas P. Mills | Holger Anderson | Michael J. O'Connor | Harold Anderson | Eugene R. Mahan | William R. Ripp | Don A. Bierle | Frank Novotny | A. A. "Joe" Quintal | Robert "Bob" Miller | Theodore Lerew | A. W. Spiry | William Lane Grams | G. Homer Harding | Clint Roberts | Billie H. Sutton | Kenneth A. Trask | James B. Dunn | Grace Mickelson | Charles E. Donnelly, Jr. | Homer Kandaras | John R. Riedy | | | District 29 eliminated from 1973 to 1985 | Districts 30-35 re-established in 1985 | | | | | | 48th-49th 1973–74 |
| 50th-51st 1975–76 | Curtis Jones | E. C. Pieplow | Frances S. Lamont | Arlo Leddy | Jacob J. Krull, Jr. | Mary A. McClure | John E. Bibby | Henry A. Poppen | Jack Jackson | Rodney M. Hall | Harold D. Schreier | Sheldon R. Sonstad | Jerome Mayer | Marilynn Kelm | David H. Billion | Michael J. O'Connor | Harold Anderson | Eugene R. Mahan | William R. Ripp | Kenneth B. Jones | Jess Tjeerdsma | George H. Shanard | Philip Testerman | Theodore Lerew | LeRoy G. Hoffman | William Lane Grams | G. Homer Harding | Clint Roberts | Billie H. Sutton | Charles E. Flyte | James B. Dunn | Grace Mickelson | Robert W. Kelly | Homer Kandaras | John R. Riedy | | | District 29 eliminated from 1973 to 1985 | Districts 30-35 re-established in 1985 | | | | | | 50th-51st 1975–76 |
| 50th-51st 1975–76 | Curtis Jones | E. C. Pieplow | Frances S. Lamont | Arlo Leddy | Jacob J. Krull, Jr. | Mary A. McClure | John E. Bibby | Henry A. Poppen | Jack Jackson | Rodney M. Hall | Harold D. Schreier | Sheldon R. Sonstad | Jerome Mayer | Elaine L. McCart | David H. Billion | Michael J. O'Connor | Harold Anderson | Eugene R. Mahan | William R. Ripp | Kenneth B. Jones | Jess Tjeerdsma | George H. Shanard | Philip Testerman | Theodore Lerew | LeRoy G. Hoffman | William Lane Grams | G. Homer Harding | Clint Roberts | Billie H. Sutton | Charles E. Flyte | James B. Dunn | Grace Mickelson | Robert W. Kelly | Homer Kandaras | John R. Riedy | | | District 29 eliminated from 1973 to 1985 | Districts 30-35 re-established in 1985 | | | | | | 50th-51st 1975–76 |
| 52nd-53rd 1977–78 | Curtis Jones | Robert K. Williams | Frances S. Lamont | Harold W. Halverson | Jacob J. Krull, Jr. | Mary A. McClure | John E. Bibby | Henry A. Poppen | Theodore I. Spaulding | Milton E. Nelson | Harold D. Schreier | Sheldon R. Sonstad | Henry Carlson, Jr. | Wendell H. Hanson | David H. Billion | Michael J. O'Connor | Roger D. McKellips | Eugene R. Mahan | William R. Ripp | Kenneth B. Jones | Jess Tjeerdsma | George H. Shanard | Philip Testerman | Robert Hoffman | LeRoy G. Hoffman | William Lane Grams | G. Homer Harding | Clint Roberts | Billie H. Sutton | Charles E. Flyte | James B. Dunn | Lyndell Hans Petersen | Donald Frankenfeld | Franklin Owen Simpson | Eldon S. Jensen | | | District 29 eliminated from 1973 to 1985 | Districts 30-35 re-established in 1985 | | | | | | 52nd-53rd 1977–78 |
| 52nd-53rd 1977–78 | Curtis Jones | Robert K. Williams | Frances S. Lamont | Harold W. Halverson | Jacob J. Krull, Jr. | Mary A. McClure | John E. Bibby | Henry A. Poppen | Theodore I. Spaulding | Milton E. Nelson | Harold D. Schreier | Sheldon R. Sonstad | Henry Carlson, Jr. | Wendell H. Hanson | David H. Billion | Jerome Mayer | Roger D. McKellips | Eugene R. Mahan | William R. Ripp | Kenneth B. Jones | Robert "Bob" Lyons | George H. Shanard | Philip Testerman | Robert Hoffman | LeRoy G. Hoffman | William Lane Grams | G. Homer Harding | Clint Roberts | Billie H. Sutton | Charles E. Flyte | James B. Dunn | Lyndell Hans Petersen | Donald Frankenfeld | Franklin Owen Simpson | Eldon S. Jensen | | | District 29 eliminated from 1973 to 1985 | Districts 30-35 re-established in 1985 | | | | | | 52nd-53rd 1977–78 |
| 54th-55th 1979–80 | Curtis Jones | Robert K. Williams | Frances S. Lamont | Harold W. Halverson | Jacob J. Krull, Jr. | Mary A. McClure | John E. Bibby | Henry A. Poppen | Paul S. Tschetter | Milton E. Nelson | Harold D. Schreier | Arnold E. Amundson | Alva W. Scarbrough | Richard D. Flynn | Richard O. Gregerson | Jerome Mayer | Harold Anderson | Eugene R. Mahan | William R. Ripp | Donald C. Peterson | Carrol V. "Red" Allen | George H. Shanard | Philip Testerman | Robert Hoffman | James L. Stoick | William Lane Grams | G. Homer Harding | Mavis T. Hogen | Doris P. Miner | Marshall J. Truax | James B. Dunn | Lyndell Hans Petersen | Donald Frankenfeld | Carl Ham | Eldon S. Jensen | | | District 29 eliminated from 1973 to 1985 | Districts 30-35 re-established in 1985 | | | | | | 54th-55th 1979–80 |
| 56th-57th 1981–82 | Curtis Jones | Robert K. Williams | Frances S. Lamont | Harold W. Halverson | Jacob J. Krull, Jr. | Mary A. McClure | John E. Bibby | Henry A. Poppen | Leland Kleinsasser | Clyde E. Streff | Wallace B. Hanson | Walter I. Bones | Alva W. Scarbrough | Wendell H. Hanson | Richard O. Gregerson | Michael J. O'Connor | Roger D. McKellips | Eugene R. Mahan | William R. Ripp | Donald C. Peterson | Carrol V. "Red" Allen | George H. Shanard | Robert N. Duxbury | Robert Hoffman | James L. Stoick | Robert Lloyd Samuelson | G. Homer Harding | Mavis T. Hogen | Doris P. Miner | Jack Manke | James B. Dunn | Lyndell Hans Petersen | Donald Frankenfeld | Carl Ham | John L. Browne | | | District 29 eliminated from 1973 to 1985 | Districts 30-35 re-established in 1985 | | | | | | 56th-57th 1981–82 |
| 58th-59th 1983–84 | Curtis Jones | Robert K. Williams | Frances S. Lamont | Harold W. Halverson | Thomas E. Roby | Mary A. McClure | Walter C. "Walt" Conahan | Henry A. Poppen | Leland Kleinsasser | Walter I. Bones | Wallace B. Hanson | Gary W. Hanson | Alva W. Scarbrough | Henry Carlson, Jr. | Tom Krueger | Robert R. Giebink | Roger D. McKellips | Tim Johnson | Elmer A. Bietz | Donald C. Peterson | Carrol V. "Red" Allen | George H. Shanard | Clyde E. Streff | G. Homer Harding | James L. Stoick | Robert Lloyd Samuelson | Richard W. Waddell | Thomas E. Shortbull | Doris P. Miner | Jack Manke | James B. Dunn | Lyndell Hans Petersen | Donald Frankenfeld | Carl Ham | John L. Browne | | | District 29 eliminated from 1973 to 1985 | Districts 30-35 re-established in 1985 | | | | | | 58th-59th 1983–84 |
| 60th-61st 1985–86 | Curtis Jones | Frances S. Lamont | | David S. Laustsen | Thomas E. Roby | Mary A. McClure | Harold W. Halverson | Walter C. "Walt" Conahan | Henry A. Poppen | Walter I. Bones | Wallace B. Hanson | Sheldon R. Sonstad | | | | | Keith Paisley | Gary W. Hanson | Tom Krueger | Karen Muenster | Roger D. McKellips | Tim Johnson | Elmer A. Bietz | Donald C. Peterson | Leonard E. Andera | George H. Shanard | James A. Burg | Leland Paul Kleinsasser | G. Homer Harding | James L. Stoick | Bruce L. Walker | Richard W. Waddell | | | Thomas E. Shortbull | | | Doris P. Miner | Jack Manke | James B. Dunn | Lyndell Petersen | Ed Glassgow | Carl Ham | John L. Browne | 60th-61st 1985–86 |
| 62nd-63rd 1987–88 | Paul N. Symens | Frances S. Lamont | | William R. Taylor | Dorothy M. Kellogg | Mary A. McClure | Harold W. Halverson | Walter C. "Walt" Conahan | Henry A. Poppen | Walter I. Bones | Wallace B. Hanson | Sheldon R. Sonstad | | | | | Keith Paisley | Gary W. Hanson | Randall J. Austad | Karen Muenster | Roger D. McKellips | Roland A. Chicoine | Elmer A. Bietz | Carrol V. "Red" Allen | Leonard E. Andera | George H. Shanard | Clyde E. Streff | Leland Paul Kleinsasser | G. Homer Harding | James L. Stoick | Bruce L. Walker | Richard W. Waddell | | | Thomas E. Shortbull | | | Doris P. Miner | James W. Emery | James B. Dunn | Lyndell Petersen | Ed Glassgow | Michael G. Diedrich | John L. Browne | 62nd-63rd 1987–88 |
| 64th-65th 1989–90 | Paul N. Symens | Lars Herseth | | William R. Taylor | Dorothy M. Kellogg | Scott N. Heidepriem | Harold W. Halverson | Mary Kathryn Wagner | Henry A. Poppen | Walter I. Bones | Wallace B. Hanson | Pam Nelson | | | | | Keith Paisley | Richard Belatti | Randall J. Austad | Karen Muenster | Roger D. McKellips | Roland A. Chicoine | Elmer A. Bietz | Carrol V. "Red" Allen | Leonard E. Andera | George H. Shanard | Clyde E. Streff | Charlie Flowers | Jacqueline A. Kelley | James L. Stoick | Bruce L. Walker | Richard W. Waddell | | | Gary D. Nelson | | | Doris P. Miner | James W. Emery | James B. Dunn | Lyndell Petersen | Judy Olson | Michael G. Diedrich | William J. Johnson | 64th-65th 1989–90 |
| 66th-67th 1991–92 | Paul N. Symens | Lars Herseth | | William R. Taylor | Dorothy M. Kellogg | Scott N. Heidepriem | Harold W. Halverson | Mary Kathryn Wagner | Henry A. Poppen | Roberta A. Rasmussen | Gerald F. Lange | Pam Nelson | | | | | Keith Paisley | Richard Belatti | Linda L. Stensland | Karen Muenster | Roger D. McKellips | Roland A. Chicoine | Elmer A. Bietz | Carrol V. "Red" Allen | Eleanor Saukerson | George H. Shanard | JoAnn Morford | Charlie Flowers | Mike Rounds | James L. Stoick | Carol Maicki | Roger A. Porch | | | Paul Valandra | | | Doris P. Miner | James W. Emery | James B. Dunn | Lyndell Petersen | Judy Olson | Bob Haskell | William J. Johnson | 66th-67th 1991–92 |
| 68th-69th 1993–94 | Paul N. Symens | Lars Herseth | | James F. "Jim" Lawler | Harold Halverson | Dale L. Howlett | Randy Frederick | Richard B. Negstad | Gerald F. Lange | Mark E. Rogen | Chet Jones | Pam Nelson | | | | | Keith Paisley | Dennis Pierson | Linda L. Stensland | Rebecca Dunn | Roger D. McKellips | Roberta A. Rasmussen | Bernie Hunhoff | Frank Kloucek | Mel Olson | Charlie Flowers | JoAnn Morford | Darrell Bender | Mike Rounds | Eleanor Saukerson | Roger A. Porch | Paul Valandra | | | William J. Johnson | | | Leslie J. Kleven | James W. Emery | James B. Dunn | Michael Gordon Diedrich | Lyndell Petersen | Jerry J. Shoener | Sharon V. Green | 68th-69th 1993–94 |
| 70th-71st 1995–96 | Lee Schoenbeck | Lars Herseth | | James F. "Jim" Lawler | Harold Halverson | Jim D. Thompson | Randy Frederick | Richard B. Negstad | Gerald F. Lange | Mark E. Rogen | Chet Jones | Pam Nelson | | | | | Keith Paisley | Kermit Staggers | Barbara Everist | Rebecca Dunn | Donn C. Larson | Roberta A. Rasmussen | Bernie Hunhoff | Frank Kloucek | Mel Olson | Charlie Flowers | JoAnn Morford | Darrell Bender | Mike Rounds | Jim Hutmacher | Roger A. Porch | Paul Valandra | | | William J. Johnson | | | Leslie J. Kleven | James W. Emery | James B. Dunn | Mitchell C. LaFleur | Fred Whiting | Jerry J. Shoener | Alan Aker | 70th-71st 1995–96 |
| 72nd-73rd 1997–98 | Paul N. Symens | H. Paul Dennert | | James F. "Jim" Lawler | Harold Halverson | Jim D. Thompson | Randy Frederick | Arnold M. Brown | Gerald F. Lange | Dennis Daugaard | Dave Munson | Dick Hainje | | | | | Keith Paisley | Kermit Staggers | Barbara Everist | Rebecca Dunn | Kenneth D. Albers | John J. Reedy | Bernie Hunhoff | Frank Kloucek | Mel Olson | Charlie Flowers | JoAnn Morford | Robert Drake | Mike Rounds | Jim Hutmacher | Robert Benson | Paul Valandra | | | William J. Johnson | | | Marguerite Kleven | Drue J. Vitter | James B. Dunn | Arlene H. Ham | Fred Whiting | Jerry J. Shoener | Alan Aker | 72nd-73rd 1997–98 |
| 74th-75th 1999–2000 | Paul N. Symens | H. Paul Dennert | | James F. "Jim" Lawler | Harold Halverson | Donald "Don" Brosz | Randy Frederick | Arnold M. Brown | Gerald F. Lange | Dennis Daugaard | Dave Munson | Dick Hainje | | | | | Keith Paisley | Kermit Staggers | Barbara Everist | Rebecca Dunn | Kenneth D. Albers | John J. Reedy | Gary A. Moore | Frank Kloucek | Mel Olson | Charlie Flowers | Robert M. Duxbury | Robert Drake | Mike Rounds | Jim Hutmacher | Robert Benson | Paul Valandra | | | Eric H. Bogue | | | Marguerite Kleven | Drue J. Vitter | James B. Dunn | Arlene H. Ham | Fred Whiting | Jerry J. Shoener | Cheryl Madden | 74th-75th 1999–2000 |
| 76th-77th 2001–02 | Paul N. Symens | H. Paul Dennert | | Elmer Diedtrich | Larry Diedrich | Donald "Don" Brosz | Brock Greenfield | Arnold M. Brown | Dan Sutton | Dennis Daugaard | Dave Munson | Rebekah A. Cradduck | | | | | John R. McIntyre | Dick M. Kelly | Barbara Everist | Gil Koetzle | Kenneth D. Albers | John J. Reedy | Gary A. Moore | J.E. "Jim" Putnam | Ed Olson | Ron J. Volesky | Robert M. Duxbury | Robert Drake | Patricia de Hueck | Jim Hutmacher | John Koskan | Richard "Dick" Hagen | | | Eric H. Bogue | | | Marguerite Kleven | Drue J. Vitter | Jerry Apa | Arlene H. Ham | Fred Whiting | Royal "Mac" McCracken | Cheryl Madden | 76th-77th 2001–02 |
| 78th-79th 2003–04 | Paul N. Symens | H. Paul Dennert | | Duane O. Sutton | Larry Diedrich | Lee Schoenbeck | Brock Greenfield | Arnold M. Brown | Dan Sutton | Tom Dempster | Gene G. Abdallah | Mike Jaspers | | | | | William F. Earley | Dick M. Kelly | Dave Knudson | Gil Koetzle | Kenneth D. Albers | John J. Reedy | Gary A. Moore | Frank Kloucek | Ed Olson | Sam Nachtigal | Robert M. Duxbury | Jay Duenwald | Patricia de Hueck | Clarence L. Kooistra | John Koskan | Michael LaPointe | | | Eric H. Bogue | | | Marguerite Kleven | Drue J. Vitter | Jerry Apa | Arlene H. Ham | J. P. Duniphan | Royal "Mac" McCracken | William Napoli | 78th-79th 2003–04 |
| 80th-81st 2005–06 | Gary D. Hanson | Jim Hundstad | | Duane O. Sutton | Jim Peterson | Lee Schoenbeck | Brock Greenfield | Orville B. Smidt | Dan Sutton | Tom Dempster | Gene G. Abdallah | Jason M. Gant | | | | | William F. Earley | Dick M. Kelly | Dave Knudson | Gil Koetzle | Mike Broderick | Ben Nesselhuf | Gary A. Moore | Frank Kloucek | Ed Olson | Julie Bartling | Tom Hansen | Jay Duenwald | Bob Gray | Clarence L. Kooistra | John Koskan | Theresa Two Bulls | | | Eric H. Bogue | | | Kenneth McNenny | Jim Lintz | Jerry Apa | Stan Adelstein | J. P. Duniphan | Royal "Mac" McCracken | William Napoli | 80th-81st 2005–06 |
| 82nd-83rd 2007–08 | Gary D. Hanson | Jim Hundstad | | Alan C. Hoerth | Jim Peterson | Nancy Turbak Berry | Brock Greenfield | Orville B. Smidt | Dan Sutton | Tom Dempster | Gene G. Abdallah | Jason M. Gant | | | | | Sandy Jerstad | Scott N. Heidepriem | Dave Knudson | Gil Koetzle | Kenneth D. Albers | Ben Nesselhuf | Jean Hunhoff | Frank Kloucek | Ed Olson | Cooper Garnos | Tom Hansen | Jay Duenwald | Bob Gray | Arlen "Arnie" Hauge | Julie Bartling | Theresa Two Bulls | | | Ryan Maher | | | Kenneth McNenny | Jim Lintz | Jerry Apa | Tom Katus | Dennis Schmidt | Royal "Mac" McCracken | William Napoli | 82nd-83rd 2007–08 |
| 84th-85th 2009-2010 | Gary D. Hanson | Jim Hundstad | | Al Novstrup | Jim Peterson | Nancy Turbak Berry | Art Fryslie | Pamela Merchant | Russ Olson | Tom Dempster | Gene G. Abdallah | Jason M. Gant | | | | | Sandy Jerstad | Scott N. Heidepriem | Dave Knudson | Kathy Miles | Margaret Gillespie | Ben Nesselhuf | Jean Hunhoff | Frank Kloucek | Mike Vehle | Cooper Garnos | Tom Hansen | Corey Brown | Bob Gray | Dan Ahlers | Julie Bartling | Jim Bradford | | | Ryan Maher | | | Larry Rhoden | Gordon Howie | Tom Nelson | Stan Adelstein | Dennis Schmidt | Craig Tieszen | Jeff Haverly | 84th-85th 2009-2010 |
| 86th-87th 2011-2012 | Jason Frerichs | Jim Hundstad | | Al Novstrup | Tim Begalka | Ried Holien | Art Fryslie | Larry Tidemann | Russ Olson | Deb Peters | Shantel Krebs | Todd Schlekeway | | | | | J. Mark Johnston | Phyllis Heineman | Joni Cutler | Angie Buhl-O'Donnell | Dan Lederman | Eldon Nygaard | Jean Hunhoff | J.E. "Jim" Putnam | Mike Vehle | Kent Juhnke | Tom Hansen | Corey Brown | Bob Gray | Timothy Rave | Billie Sutton | Jim Bradford | | | Ryan Maher | | | Larry Rhoden | Bruce Rampelberg | Tom Nelson | Stan Adelstein | Elizabeth Kraus | Craig Tieszen | Jeff Haverly | 86th-87th 2011-2012 |
| 88th-89th 2013-2014 | Jason Frerichs | Chuck Welke | | Al Novstrup | Tim Begalka | Ried Holien | Ernie Otten | Larry Tidemann | Chuck Jones | Deb Peters | Shantel Krebs | David Omdahl | | | | | Blake Curd | Phyllis Heineman | Deb Soholt | Angie Buhl-O'Donnell | Dan Lederman | Tom Jones | Jean Hunhoff | Bill Van Gerpen | Mike Vehle | Billie Sutton | Jim White | Corey Brown | Jeff Monroe | Timothy Rave | Larry Lucas | Jim Bradford | | | Ryan Maher | | | Larry Rhoden | Bruce Rampelberg | Bob Ewing | Alan Solano | Phil Jensen | Craig Tieszen | Mark Kirkeby | 88th-89th 2013-2014 |
| 90th-91st 2015-2016 | Jason Frerichs | Brock Greenfield | | David Novstrup | Jim Peterson | Ried Holien | Ernie Otten | Larry Tidemann | Scott Parsley | Deb Peters | Jenna Haggar | David Omdahl | | | | | Blake Curd | Phyllis Heineman | Deb Soholt | Angie Buhl-O'Donnell | Dan Lederman | Arthur Rusch | Bernie Hunhoff | Bill Van Gerpen | Mike Vehle | Billie Sutton | Jim White | Corey Brown | Jeff Monroe | Timothy Rave | Troy Heinert | Jim Bradford | | | Betty Olson | | | Gary Cammack | Bruce Rampelberg | Bob Ewing | Alan Solano | Phil Jensen | Craig Tieszen | Terri Haverly | 90th-91st 2015-2016 |
| 92nd-93rd 2017-2018 | Jason Frerichs | Brock Greenfield | | Al Novstrup | John Wiik | Neal Tapio | Ernie Otten | Larry Tidemann | Jordan Youngberg | Deb Peters | Jenna Haggar | Jim Stalzer | | | | | Blake Curd | Jack Kolbeck | Deb Soholt | Reynold Nesiba | James "Jim" Bolin | Arthur Rusch | Craig Kennedy | Stace Nelson | Joshua Klumb | Billie Sutton | Jim White | Justin Cronin | Jeff Monroe | Kris Langer | Troy Heinert | Kevin Killer | | | Ryan Maher | | | Gary Cammack | Lance Russell | Bob Ewing | Alan Solano | Phil Jensen | Jeff Partridge | Terri Haverly | 92nd-93rd 2017-2018 |
| 94th-95th 2019-2020 | Susan Wismer | Brock Greenfield | | Al Novstrup | John Wiik | Lee Schoenbeck | Ernie Otten | V. J. Smith | Jordan Youngberg | Wayne Steinhauer | Margaret Sutton | Jim Stalzer | | | | | Blake Curd | Jack Kolbeck | Deb Soholt | Reynold Nesiba | James "Jim" Bolin | Arthur Rusch | Craig Kennedy | Stace Nelson | Joshua Klumb | Rocky Blare | Jim White | Justin Cronin | Jeff Monroe | Kris Langer | Troy Heinert | Red Dawn Foster | | | Ryan Maher | | | Gary Cammack | Lance Russell | Bob Ewing | Alan Solano | Phil Jensen | Jeff Partridge | Lynne DiSanto | 94th-95th 2019-2020 |
| 96th-97th 2021-2022 | Michael Rohl | Brock Greenfield | | Al Novstrup | John Wiik | Lee Schoenbeck | Herman Otten | V. J. Smith | Casey Crabtree | Wayne Steinhauer | Margaret Sutton | Jim Stalzer | | | | | Blake Curd | Jack Kolbeck | Larry Zikmund | Reynold Nesiba | James "Jim" Bolin | Arthur Rusch | Jean Hunhoff | Kyle Schoenfish | Joshua Klumb | Erin Tobin | David Wheeler | Bryan Breitling | Mary Duvall | Marsha Symens | Troy Heinert | Red Dawn Foster | | | Ryan Maher | | | Gary Cammack | Julie Frye-Mueller | Timothy Johns | Helene Duhamel | David Johnson | Michael Diedrich | Jessica Castleberry | 96th-97th 2021-2022 |
| 98th-99th 2023-2024 | Michael Rohl | Steve Kolbeck | | Al Novstrup | John Wiik | Lee Schoenbeck | Herman Otten | Tim Reed | Casey Crabtree | Brent Hoffman | Liz Larson | Jim Stalzer | | | | | Arch Beal | Jack Kolbeck | Larry Zikmund | Reynold Nesiba | James "Jim" Bolin | Sydney Davis | Jean Hunhoff | Kyle Schoenfish | Joshua Klumb | Erin Tobin | David Wheeler | Bryan Breitling | Jim Mehlhaff | Tom Pischke | Shawn Bordeaux | Red Dawn Foster | | | Ryan Maher | | | Dean Wink | Julie Frye-Mueller | Randy Deibert | Helene Duhamel | David Johnson | Michael Diedrich | Jessica Castleberry | 98th-99th 2023-2024 |
| 100th-101st 2025-2026 | Michael Rohl | Steve Kolbeck | | Carl Perry | Stephanie Sauder | Glen Vilhauer | Ernie Otten | Tim Reed | Casey Crabtree | Joy Hohn | Liz Larson | Chris Karr | | | | | Arch Beal | Sue Peterson | Larry Zikmund | Jamie Smith | Kevin Jensen | Sydney Davis | Lauren Nelson | Kyle Schoenfish | Paul Miskimins | Mykala Voita | David Wheeler | Mark Lapka | Jim Mehlhaff | Tom Pischke | Tamara Grove | Red Dawn Foster | | | J. Sam Marty | | | John Carley | Amber Hulse | Randy Deibert | Helene Duhamel | Curt Voight | Taffy Howard | Greg Blanc | 100th-101st 2025-2026 |
| Senate Session | 1st | 2nd | | 3rd | 4th | 5th | 6th | 7th | 8th | 9th | 10th | 11th | | | | | 12th | 13th | 14th | 15th | 16th | 17th | 18th | 19th | 20th | 21st | 22nd | 23rd | 24th | 25th | 26th | 27th | | | 28th | | | 29th | 30th | 31st | 32nd | 33rd | 34th | 35th | Senate Session |
| Senate Session | District | | | | | | | | | | | | | | | | | | | | | | | | | | | | | | | | | | | | | | | | | | | | Senate Session |

== See also ==
- List of South Dakota state legislatures

== Sources ==
- South Dakota Secretary of State – 2005 South Dakota Legislative Manual
- South Dakota Secretary of State – Past Elections
- South Dakota Legislature – Legislator Historical Listing
