= Senator Waddell =

Senator Waddell may refer to:

- Charles L. Waddell (1932–2022), Virginia State Senate
- Joseph A. Waddell (1823–1914), Virginia State Senate
- Joyce Waddell (born 1944), North Carolina State Senate
- Richard W. Waddell (1922–2016), South Dakota State Senate
- William Bell Waddell (1828–1927), Pennsylvania State Senate

== See also ==
- William Garner Waddel (1870–1937), South Dakota State Senate
