= Senator Flowers =

Senator Flowers may refer to:

- Charlie Flowers (politician) (born 1939), South Dakota State Senate
- Merle Flowers (born 1968), Mississippi State Senate
- Pat Flowers (politician) (born 1956), Montana State Senate
- Richmond Flowers Sr. (1918–2007), Alabama State Senate
- Stephanie Flowers (born 1953), Arkansas State Senate
