= Richard Waddell =

Richard Waddell may refer to:

- Ricky Waddell (born 1981), Scottish footballer
- Richard W. Waddell (1922–2016), American politician in the state of South Dakota
