= Senator Conlan =

Senator Conlan may refer to:

- John Bertrand Conlan (1930–2021), Arizona State Senate
- Martin E. Conlan (1849–1923), South Dakota State Senate
