= Senator Albers =

Senator Albers may refer to:

- John Albers (born 1972), Georgia State Senate
- Kenneth D. Albers (born 1941), South Dakota State Senate
- W. W. Albers (1860–1951), Wisconsin State Senate
