= Senator Amsden =

Senator Amsden may refer to:

- C. S. Amsden (1856–1943), South Dakota State Senate
- Rollin Amsden (1829–1899), Vermont State Senate
