= Senator Whiting =

Senator Whiting may refer to:

- E. I. Whiting (1883–1963), Arizona State Senate
- Fred Whiting (born 1938), South Dakota State Senate
- Justin R. Whiting (1847–1903), Michigan State Senate
- Lorenzo D. Whiting (1819–1889), Illinois State Senate
- William Whiting II (1841–1911), Massachusetts State Senate
- Zach Whiting (born 1987), Iowa State Senate
