= Senator Newland =

Senator Newland may refer to:

- James E. Newland (1830–1907), South Dakota State Senate
- William C. Newland (1860–1938), North Carolina State Senate

== See also ==
- Francis G. Newlands (1846–1917), U.S. Senator from Nevada from 1903 to 1917
