= Cheryl Madden =

American politician

Member of the South Dakota Senate from the 35th district
- In office January 12, 1999 – January 14, 2003
- Preceded by: Alan Aker
- Succeeded by: William Napoli

Member of the South Dakota House of Representatives from the 35th district
- In office January 12, 1993 – January 12, 1999
- Succeeded by: Alice McCoy

Personal details
- Born: November 15, 1948 (age 77) Burke, South Dakota
- Party: Republican

Cheryl Madden (born November 15, 1948) is an American politician who served in the South Dakota House of Representatives from the 35th district from 1993 to 1999 and in the South Dakota Senate from the 35th district from 1999 to 2003.
