= Arnold E. Amundson =

American politician (1911–1993)

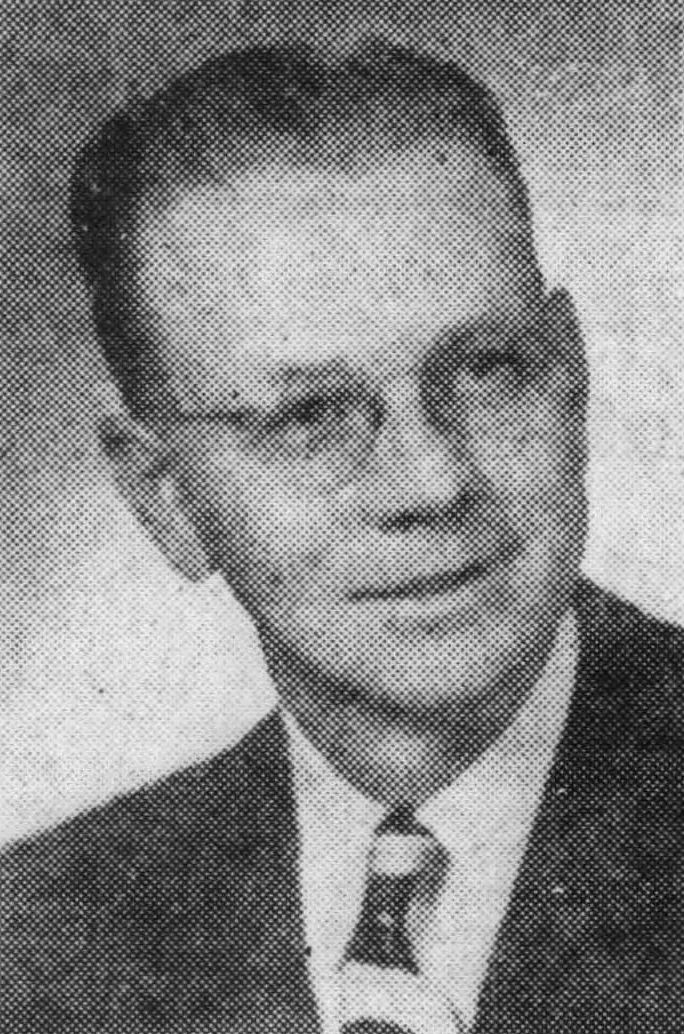

Member of the South Dakota Senate from the 11th district
- In office 1979 – 1980

Member of the South Dakota House of Representatives from the 11th district
- In office 1977 – 1978

Personal details
- Born: Arnold Ernest Amundson; August 25, 1911; Colton, South Dakota, U.S.
- Died: March 25, 1993 (aged 81); Sioux Falls, South Dakota, U.S.
- Political party: Republican
- Spouse: Marguerite McCormick (m. 1933)
- Children: 3

Arnold Ernest Amundson (August 25, 1911 – March 25, 1993) was an American politician and businessman. He served in the South Dakota Senate from 1979 to 1980, representing the 11th district. Amundson also represented the district in the South Dakota House of Representatives from 1977 to 1978.

== Life and career ==
Amundson was born in Colton, South Dakota, on August 25, 1911. Amundson graduated from high school in 1929, and attended Augustana College in Rock Island, Illinois. He married Marguerite McCormick on September 1, 1933, and they would settle in Sioux Falls, South Dakota. They had three children together. Shortly after moving to Sioux Falls in 1943, Amundson worked for International Harverster in several cities. He soon formed the Dakota Farm Business in 1945 and was its owner until selling it in 1964. In 1951, he was elected as the president of the Sioux Lions club. Amundson was also a member of the Sioux Falls Chamber of Commerce, president of the South Dakota Retail Farm Equipment Association, and director of the Minnesota-South Dakota Farm Equipment Association. In 1964, Amundson accepted a position at the Northwestern National Bank of Sioux Falls to manage its farm machinery. He served as the vice president and manager of the Stockyards Branch. He retired from the company in August 1976.

Amundson announced his campaign to represent the 11th district in the South Dakota House of Representatives in April 1976, seeking the Republican Party nomination. During his campaign, he supported increased gasoline taxes and state funding for school districts, and was also against income and sales tax increases. He was elected with 22 thousand votes, alongside nine other candidates. Amundson was assigned to the Local Government Study Commission. During the first few months of his term, several measures sponsored by Amundson were approved in the House, including one that called for an increase in the salaries of sheriffs, and another that endorsed the concept of the Center for Earth Resources Observation and Science. Amundson introduced legislation that created minimum mandatory sentences for armed crimes.

In March 1978 Amundson announced a bid for the South Dakota Senate after being encouraged by friends to do so and believing that there needed to be more experienced legislators in the chamber. During his campaign, he supported a proposed constitutional amendment that would prohibit abortion nationwide. He was elected alongside five other people, coming in second place and receiving over 17 thousand votes. Amundson was assigned to the Local Government Study Commission. Amundson announced his campaign for re-election in March 1980. He lost the primaries and garnered just shy of five thousand votes. After losing, he and Sheldon Songstad, who also lost, claimed that the county auditor was told by members of the Republican Party to alter the layout of the ballot, which lowered their chances for election.

In December 1980 Amundson stated that he would run for chairman of the Minnehaha County Republican Party. He was elected unopposed, succeeding Helen Boyer. On November 5, 1981, Amundson resigned from the position due to arising health problems. Amundson died on March 25, 1993, at the McKennan Hospital in Sioux Falls, South Dakota. He was buried at the Woodlawn Cemetery on March 29.

== Electoral history ==
1976 South Dakota House of Representatives 11th district election
Party	Candidate	Votes	%
Republican	Lowell C. Hansen II	26,164	6.57%
Republican	Walt Bones Jr.	24,884	6.25%
Republican	Richard Flynn	23,224	5.83%
Republican	Henry Knochenmus	22,636	5.69%
Republican	Arnold Amundson	22,326	5.61%
Republican	Hal Wick	21,831	5.48%
Republican	Bernice Johnson	21,094	5.30%
Republican	Gregory Peterson	20,972	5.27%
Republican	Roger Reid	20,939	5.26%
Republican	Debra R. Anderson	20,264	5.09%
Democratic	Dennis McFarland	19,171	4.81%
Democratic	Gale Fisher	18,730	4.70%
Democratic	Linda Lea Miller	17,750	4.46%
Democratic	Wally Myers	17,747	4.46%
Democratic	George Kirk	17,357	4.36%
Democratic	Mary Vanderlinde	17,137	4.30%
Democratic	Richard Barnes	16,599	4.17%
Democratic	Loila Hunking	16,587	4.17%
Democratic	Gordon Lovell	16,456	4.13%
Democratic	Robert Sivertson	16,289	4.09%
Total votes		398,157	100.00%

1978 South Dakota Senate 11th district election
Party	Candidate	Votes	%
Republican	Richard "Dick" Flynn	18,550	11.29%
Republican	Arnold E. Amundson	17,584	10.70%
Republican	Alva Scarbrough	17,504	10.66%
Republican	Richard Gregerson	17,096	10.41%
Democratic	Jerry Mayer	16,927	10.30%
Republican	Henry Carlson Jr.	16,701	10.17%
Republican	George Kirk	15,700	9.56%
Democratic	Robert O'Connor	15,590	9.49%
Democratic	Parnell Donohue	14,807	9.01%
Democratic	Earl McCart	13,816	8.41%
Total votes		164,275	100.00%

1980 South Dakota Senate 11th district election, Republican primary
Party	Candidate	Votes	%
Republican	Wendell H. Hanson (incumbent)	7,373	17.45%
Republican	Richard I. Bones (incumbent)	7,370	17.44%
Republican	Richard O. Gregerson (incumbent)	7,102	16.81%
Republican	Alva W. Scarbrough (incumbent)	6,551	15.50%
Republican	Henry Carlson Jr. (incumbent)	5,293	12.52%
Republican	Arnold E. Amundson (incumbent)	4,952	11.72%
Republican	Gilbert Paulton	3,620	8.57%
Total votes		42,261	100.00%
