= 1978 South Dakota gubernatorial election =

- November 7, 1978
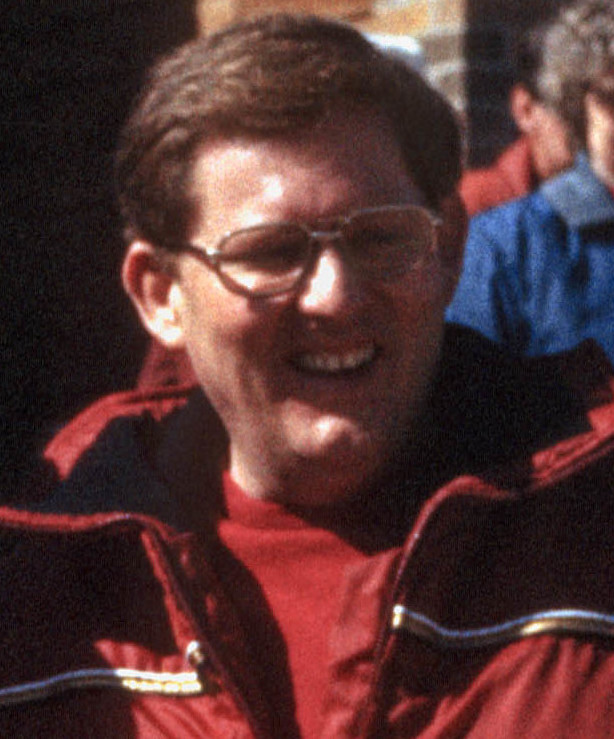

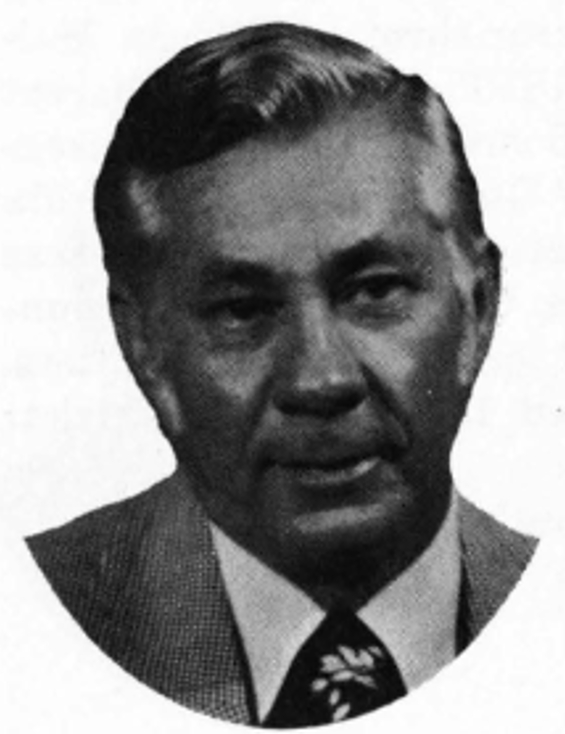
Nominee	Bill Janklow	Roger D. McKellips
Party	Republican	Democratic
Running mate	Lowell Hansen	Billie Sutton
Popular vote	147,116	112,679
Percentage	56.63%	43.37%
- County results Janklow: 50–60% 60–70% 70–80% McKellips: 50–60% 60–70% 70–80% 80–90%
Governor before election
Harvey Wollman
Democratic
Elected Governor
Bill Janklow
Republican

The 1978 South Dakota gubernatorial election was held on November 7, 1978, to elect a governor of South Dakota. Republican nominee Bill Janklow was elected, defeating Democratic nominee Roger D. McKellips. Janklow's victory in this election started the longest unbroken streak of either party winning gubernatorial elections in any state.

== Democratic primary ==
=== Candidates ===
- John Bohr
- Roger D. McKellips, member of South Dakota Senate
- Harvey L. Wollman, incumbent governor of South Dakota

=== Results ===
Democratic primary results
Party	Candidate	Votes	%
Democratic	Roger McKellips	34,160	49.09
Democratic	Harvey L. Wollman (incumbent)	32,690	46.97
Democratic	John Bohr	2,743	3.94
Total votes		69,593	100.00

== Republican primary ==
=== Candidates ===
- LeRoy G. Hoffman, member of the South Dakota Senate
- Bill Janklow, attorney general of South Dakota
- Clint Roberts, member of the South Dakota Senate

=== Results ===
Republican primary results
Party	Candidate	Votes	%
Republican	Bill Janklow	46,423	50.89
Republican	LeRoy G. Hoffman	30,026	32.92
Republican	Clint Roberts	14,774	16.20
Total votes		91,223	100.00

== General election ==
=== Results ===
South Dakota gubernatorial election, 1978
Party	Candidate	Votes	%
Republican	Bill Janklow	147,116	56.63
Democratic	Roger D. McKellips	112,679	43.37
Total votes		259,795	100.00
Republican gain from Democratic			
