= Roger D. McKellips =

American politician

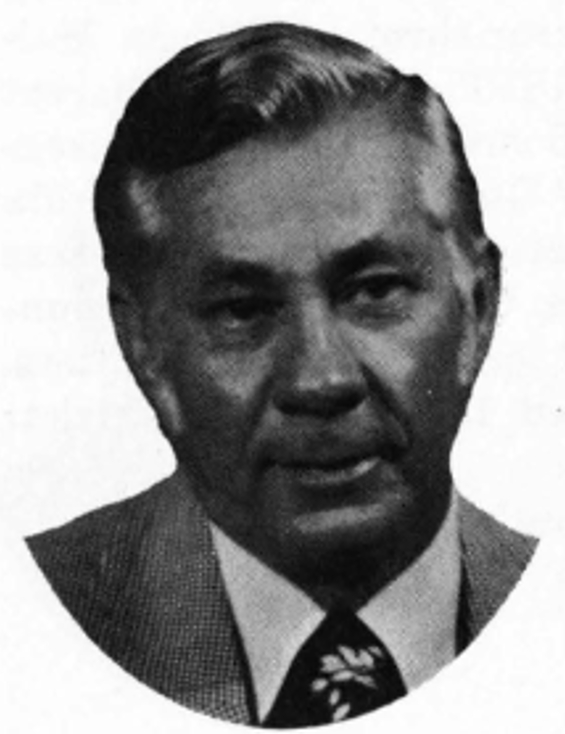

Member of the South Dakota Senate from the 12th district
- In office 1977–1978
- Preceded by: Harold Anderson
- Succeeded by: Harold Anderson

Member of the South Dakota Senate from the 12th district
- In office 1981–1984
- Preceded by: Harold Anderson
- Succeeded by: Keith Paisley

Member of the South Dakota Senate from the 16th district
- In office 1985–1994
- Preceded by: Carrol V. "Red" Allen
- Succeeded by: Donn C. Larson

Personal details
- Born: January 26, 1923 Alcester, South Dakota, U.S.
- Died: August 18, 2017 (aged 94) Sioux Falls, South Dakota, U.S.
- Party: Democratic
- Children: 4
- Profession: banker

Roger D. McKellips (January 26, 1923 – August 18, 2017) was an American politician and banker. He was a member of the South Dakota Senate from 1977 to 1978 and then from 1981 to 1994; he was the minority leader of the senate from 1983 to 1992 and the majority leader from 1993 to 1994.

== Background ==
McKellips was born in Alcester, South Dakota. He went to Morningside College. McKellips served in the United States Army Air Forces during World War II. He was stationed in China and India. McKellips moved with his wife and family to Lawrence, Kansas. He received his bachelor's degree in business from University of Kansas. He moved back to Alcester and worked in the banking business. In 2008, McKellips and his wife moved to Dow Rummel Village in Sioux Falls, South Dakota. McKellips passed away there in 2017.

Party political offices
Preceded by Richard F. Kneip	Democratic nominee for Governor of South Dakota; 1978	Succeeded by Michael J. O'Connor
