= Z. D. Scott =

American politician

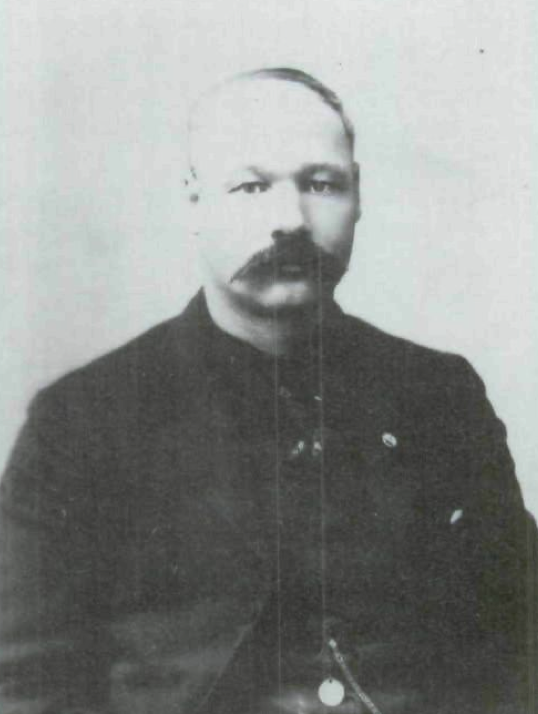
Portrait of Z. D. Scott, undated

Ziba Dexter Scott (1846–1922) was a socialist politician and activist in the Dakota Territory and later the United States state of South Dakota.

In 1887, Scott was serving as the treasurer of Grant County, South Dakota. He served in the South Dakota State Senate from 1891 to 1892. Representing the 31st district, encompassing Grant County and Roberts County in the second legislative session since statehood, Scott sat in the state senate as an independent and during his term resided in Wilmot, in Roberts County. Scott, along with another independent, played a role in an effort to get fellow state senator of the 33rd district, James H. Kyle, of the Populist Party, elected to the United States Senate in 1891.

He attempted to return to the state senate in 1894, a candidate under the populist banner for Beadle County. He was endorsed by the Beadle County Independents' Central Committee. A newspaper column at the time, entitled "Great Scott!" commented:

Z. D. Scott, candidate for state senator on the pop ticket represented Grant county in the legislature of 1890. His record was one continual round of failures, his chief stock in trade during that session was windy crankisms. At the close of the session he went home to his Grant county constituents and they gave him the coldest kind of a cold shoulder. Two years thereafter he again was a candidate and his own party people sat down on him and he was defeated. Then he sought pastures new and located in Beadle county, and is today tho pop candidate for state senator. He will be defeated here and then he will go to other pastures and Beadle county will, like Grant county, know him no more.

— The Daily Huronite, November 3, 1894,

Scott's candidacy was eventually unsuccessful. At the time, Scott was residing in Huron, South Dakota. He also maintained a farm in Grant County. In 1895, Scott was living in Mississippi, on land he had purchased near the Gulf of Mexico (near Biloxi). Another newspaper column, again titled "Great Scott!", also in The Daily Huronite at the time noted that Scott has "established a co-operative colony" there with "a few others of socialistic proclivities" would "live on fish and oysters and dream dreams".

Z. D. Scott was one of the original founders, an active member, lecturer and treasurer of the Dakota Farmers' Alliance. He resided in Milbank, Dakota Territory during the late 1880s. By 1892, Scott was also the president of the Alliance Hail Association, an association providing hail damage insurance to farmers. He was also a member and organizer of the Milbank Knights of Labor. Scott, also a notable writer, also wrote articles for The Watertown Public Opinion in Watertown, South Dakota.

Scott is remembered presently mainly on the basis of his socialist political beliefs at the time. An 1897 article in The Aberdeen Daily News lauded Scott as an "erstwhile tireless exponent" of socialism "who had the courage to put his convictions to the test". The same article also gave recognition to Scott's service to the Dakota Farmers' Alliance, describing him as a "tireless worker for it's success, directing much of his time to increasing its membership and spreading its usefulness." A 1993 publication described that Scott was "held in high esteem" across the Dakota Territory at the time, and had become one of the leading figures for the co-operative commonwealth movement of the time.

== See also ==
- David Handley

Political offices
Preceded by unknown	Treasurer of Grant County, South Dakota c. late 1880s	Succeeded by unknown
Preceded by John S. Proctor	Member of the South Dakota Senate from the 31st District; Second Session of the Senate; 1891–1892	Succeeded by Nicholas I. Lowthian
