= John Koskan =

American politician

Member of the South Dakota Senate from the 26th district
- In office January 9, 2001 – January 9, 2007
- Preceded by: Robert M. Benson
- Succeeded by: Julie Bartling

Member of the South Dakota House of Representatives from the 26th district
- In office January 12, 1993 – January 9, 2001
- Succeeded by: Barry M. Jensen

Personal details
- Born: September 27, 1955 (age 70)
- Party: Republican

John Koskan (born September 27, 1955) is an American politician who served in the South Dakota House of Representatives from the 26th district from 1993 to 2001 and in the South Dakota Senate from the 26th district from 2001 to 2007.
