= Rebecca Dunn =

American politician

Member of the South Dakota Senate from the 15th district
- In office January 12, 1993 – January 9, 2001
- Succeeded by: Gil Koetzle

Personal details
- Born: August 10, 1945 (age 81) Hammond, Indiana
- Party: Democratic

Rebecca Dunn (born August 10, 1945) is an American politician who served in the South Dakota Senate from the 15th district from 1993 to 2001.
