= Willis C. Cook =

American diplomat and politician (1874–1942)

Willis Clifford Cook (October 5, 1874 – January 4, 1942) was a United States diplomat and a politician from South Dakota.

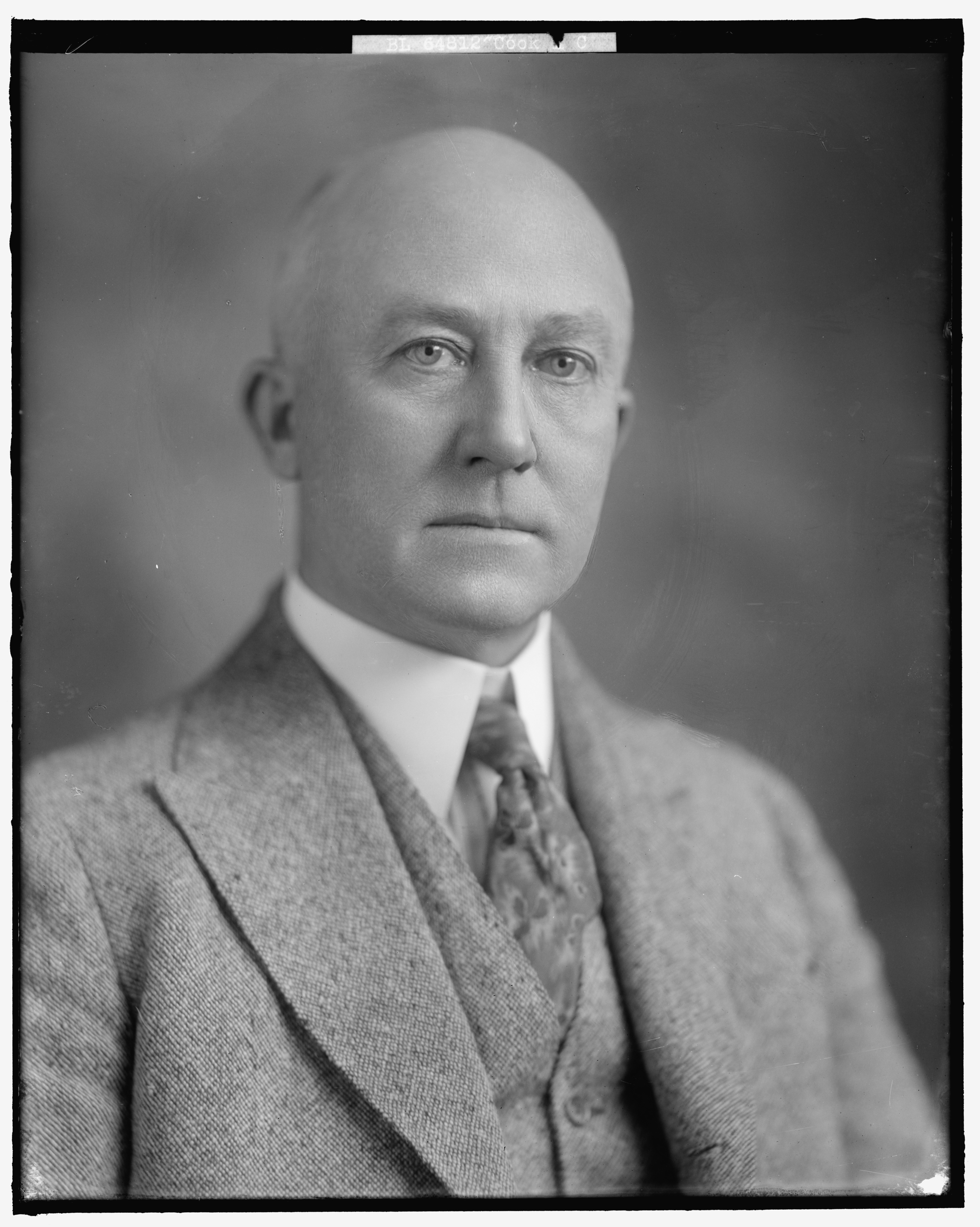

== Biography ==
Cook was born to Alfred and Sarah Cook in Gratiot, Wisconsin. In 1899 he married Mary Butler Miller.

== Career ==
Cook was County Judge of Aurora County, South Dakota from 1900 to 1902. Later he was a member of the South Dakota State Senate from 1905 to 1909. He was Chairman of the Republican Party of South Dakota from 1906 to 1912 and a Republican National Committeeman from 1916 to 1920. From 1921 to 1929 he was U.S. Minister to Venezuela.

== See also ==
- United States Ambassador to Venezuela
- Members of the South Dakota State Senate
