= Henry Poppen =

American politician (1922–2005)

Member of the South Dakota Senate from Kingsbury County
- In office 1967–1992

Personal details
- Born: Henry A. Poppen; February 12, 1922; De Smet, South Dakota, U.S.
- Died: April 13, 2005 (aged 83); De Smet, South Dakota, U.S.
- Spouses: Lorna Meyer (m. 1952; died 1980) Grace Hill (m. 1981; died 1995) Dee Lentsch (m. 1996)
- Relatives: Tony Venhuizen (grandson)

Henry A. Poppen (February 12, 1922 – April 13, 2005) was an American politician and farmer who served as a member of the South Dakota Senate from 1967 to 1992.

== Early life and career (1922–1959) ==
Henry A. Poppen was born on February 12, 1922, at the home of his parents, Otto and Sena (née Fransen) Poppen, located northwest of De Smet, South Dakota. He received a preliminary education at rural schools and, in 1939, graduated from Willow Lake High School. He was an alumnus of Huron University, graduating in 1949. On October 26, 1952, Poppen married Lorna Meyer, and they had two children together: Elizabeth and Nanette. she died in 1980. A year later, he remarried to Grace Hill on January 3. After her death in 1995, Poppen married Dee Lentsch on February 12, 1996. Poppen was crew leader of the 1959 United States Census of Agriculture and the 1960 United States census for Kingsbury County and parts of Beadle County. From 1960 to 1965, Poppen served as chairman of the Kingsbury County Republican Party.

== South Dakota Senate (1967–1992) ==
Poppen announced his campaign for the South Dakota Senate in February 1966, seeking the Republican Party nomination to represent the newly-created 7th district. The district covered the counties of Hamlin, Kingsbury, and Miner. He ran against the incumbent, Oscar L. Anderson, in the primary. Poppen ended up defeating Anderson in the primary by over 12%. In the general election, his Democratic opponent was Merwyn H. Walter, a farmer and state senator from Roswell, whom he defeated by around 16%.

After being sworn in as a legislator, Poppen hired his brother and another man to manage his farm. In February 1967 Poppen introduced SJR 7, a joint resolution to exempt all farm structures, with the exception of personal residences and industrial structures, on agricultural land from property taxes. Later that month Poppen, alongside fellow Senator John Foster, introduced a bill that would exempt the Homestake Mining Company. In December 1967, Poppen sponsored a joint resolution which promoted a proposed a constitutional amendment that would allow governments of counties to adopt a council–manager form. The resolution was proposed amid a time where legislators were in favor of modifying county governments; according to a survey by the Associated Press, 70% of legislators supported a constitutional amendment that would reorganize counties. Despite this, the bill failed to garner enough support and died in the Senate County and Municipal Affairs Committee.

Also in December 1967, Poppen filed a bill to abolish the justice of the peace and constable positions for townships. If passed, those who hold those offices would continue until either their terms expired or January 1, 1969. As well, he introduced a measure that would make it harder for city officials to be recalled, applying to mayors, aldermen, and commissioners. Poppen claimed that most recall elections are centered around "personality clashes" rather than political issues. The measure passed in a 31–2 vote the following month.

In January 1968, Poppen, alongside Art Jones, introduced a resolution that urged the United States Congress to give farmers and ranchers the ability to collectively negotiate in order to raise agricultural income. The resolution was considered by the South Dakota Senate on January 22, 1968.

== Later life and death (1992–2005) ==
On April 13, 2005, Poppen died in De Smet at the Good Samritan Center.

== Electoral history ==
1966 South Dakota's 7th senatorial district Republican primary
Party	Candidate	Votes	%
Republican	Henry A. Poppen	1,712	55.64%
Republican	Oscar L. Anderson (incumbent)	1,365	44.36%
Total votes		3,077	100.00%

1966 South Dakota's 7th senatorial district general election
Party	Candidate	Votes	%
Republican	Henry A. Poppen	4,653	58.02%
Democratic	Merwyn H. Walter	3,367	41.98%
Total votes		8,020	100.00%
