= S. C. Leppelman =

American politician

Member of the South Dakota Senate from the 25th district
- In office 1889–1890
- Preceded by: none
- Succeeded by: William Austin

Personal details
- Born: December 24, 1863 Ohio, United States
- Died: March 24, 1943 (aged 79) Los Angeles, California
- Party: Republican
- Spouse: Margaret S. Leppelman
- Children: Two
- Profession: Banker

Sprague Carroll Leppelman’ (December 24, 1863 – March 24, 1943) was an American politician. He served in the South Dakota State Senate from 1889 to 1890. He also sat in the Dakota Territory Legislature from 1881 to 1882.
