= Paul N. Symens =

American politician

Member of the South Dakota Senate from the 1st district
- In office 1997–2004

Member of the South Dakota House of Representatives from the 1st district
- In office 1987–1994

Personal details
- Born: July 15, 1943 (age 83) Marshall County, South Dakota
- Party: Democratic
- Spouse: Faye Bovendam
- Children: five
- Profession: Farmer

Paul N. Symens (born July 15, 1943) is an American former politician. He served in the South Dakota Senate from 1987 to 1994 and from 1997 to 2004.
