= Philip Testerman =

American politician (born 1927)

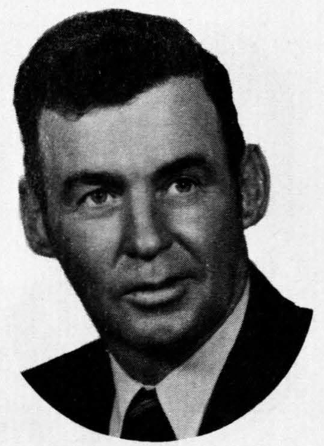

Member of the South Dakota House of Representatives
- In office 1971–1974

Member of the South Dakota Senate from the 18th district
- In office 1975–1980

Personal details
- Born: January 12, 1927 (age 99) South Dakota, U.S.
- Party: Democratic
- Children: three

Philip Testerman (born January 12, 1927) is an American politician in the state of South Dakota. He was a member of the South Dakota House of Representatives from 1971 to 1974 and the South Dakota Senate from 1975 to 1980. He was Assistant Minority Leader of the Senate from 1979 to 1980. Holding a high school education, he was a farmer and insurance agent. In the early 2000s, Testerman served as a commissioner for Hand County, and in 2018, he filed to run for the state house, but withdrew before the general election.
