= George Shanard =

American politician (1926–2012)

Member of the South Dakota Senate
- In office 1975–1992

Personal details
- Born: George Harris Shanard; July 30, 1926 Bridgewater, South Dakota
- Died: August 3, 2012 (aged 86)
- Resting place: American Legion Cemetery, Mitchell, South Dakota
- Party: Republican
- Spouse: Neva Jean Bartlett (m. 1988; died 2007)
- Children: 4
- Education: University of South Dakota
- Awards: South Dakota Hall of Fame (1999)

George Harris Shanard (July 30, 1926 – August 3, 2012) was an American politician and agribusinessman who served as a member of the South Dakota Senate from 1975 to 1992 and served as majority leader for the Republican Party from 1989 to 1992. He was inducted into the South Dakota Hall of Fame in 1999.

== Early life ==
George Harris Shanard was born on July 30, 1926, in Bridgewater, South Dakota. He graduated from the University of South Dakota with a B.S. in business administration. He served in the United States Navy during World War II.

== Agricultural career ==
In 1950, Shanard began working at his family's grain elevator business, Shanard Inc. Shanard moved the company to Mitchell, South Dakota, and opened a new branch, Big Green Fertilizer, in 1972. Shanard served as director of the National Grain Association between 1966 and 1972.

== Political career ==
Shanard was first elected to the South Dakota Senate in 1975, as a Republican. He served as assistant majority leader from 1977 to 1988 and as majority leader from 1989 to 1992.

He also served on the board for the South Dakota Legislative Research Council from 1985 to 1990, as vice chairman between 1987 and 1988, and as chairman between 1989 and 1990.

Shanard focused on state agriculture and transportation during his time in office. He oversaw the development of the South Dakota Rail Corporation and supported the development of rail infrastructure across the state.

During the 1992 election cycle, the incumbent Shanard was defeated by Democrat Mel Olson and announced he would not be seeking re-election.

== Personal life ==
Shanard had four children. He was married to Neva Jean Bartlett on March 10, 1988, in Mitchell; she died on March 14, 2007.

== Death ==
Shanard died on August 3, 2012, at the age of 86. Following the announcement of his death, then-Governor Dennis Daugaard ordered all flags in South Dakota to be flown at half-mast, calling Shanard "a warm-hearted, dedicated and respected legislative leader". He was buried on August 7, 2012, at the American Legion Cemetery in Mitchell.

== Awards and honors ==
The National Grain Association named Shanard its Grain Dealer of the Year. For his work in developing the economy of Mitchell, he was awarded a lifetime achievement award by the Mitchell Area Development Corp.

Shanard was inducted into the South Dakota Hall of Fame in 1999.
