= Walter Conahan =

American politician

Walter Charles Conahan (April 20, 1927 – April 18, 2015) was an American politician.

Born in Leola, South Dakota, Conahan received his bachelor's degree in journalism from South Dakota State University. He served as press secretary for United States Senator Karl Mundt and chief of staff to United States Representative James Abdnor. Conahan worked in Washington, D. C. for the United States Senate, the United States House of Representatives, the United States Department of Commerce, and the National Transportation Safety Board. Conahan returned to South Dakota and was the first full-time director of the South Dakota State University Foundation. Conahan served in the South Dakota State Senate from Brookings County, South Dakota, from 1983 to 1989, and was a Republican. Conahan died of cancer at his home in Sioux Falls, South Dakota.
