= C. N. McCollum =

American politician (1852-1937)

Member of the South Dakota Senate from the 25th district
- In office 1889–1890
- Preceded by: Henry Brown
- Succeeded by: James Kirk, Jr.

Personal details
- Born: February 8, 1852 New Vienna, Missouri
- Died: September 21, 1937 (aged 85) Springfield, South Dakota
- Party: Democratic
- Spouse: Jennie Lee
- Children: two
- Profession: farmer

Charles Ninian McCollum (February 8, 1852 – September 21, 1937) was an American politician. He served in the South Dakota State Senate from 1889 to 1890. He also sat in the Dakota Territory Legislature from 1881 to 1882.
