= Rodney Hall (South Dakota politician) =

American politician (born 1928)

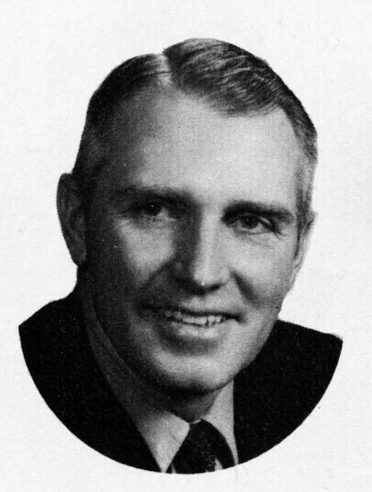

Member of the South Dakota Senate from the 9th district
- In office 1971–1976

Personal details
- Born: July 25, 1928 (age 98) Turner County, South Dakota, U.S.
- Party: Democratic
- Relations: Remarried
- Children: Four
- Education: Dakota Wesleyan & University of South Dakota
- Profession: Retired Farmer, Educator, Principal

Rodney Maple Hall (born July 25, 1928) is an American former politician in the state of South Dakota. He was a member of the South Dakota Senate from 1971 to 1976. He attended Dakota Wesleyan University and the University of South Dakota where he earned a master's degree in education. He is a veteran of the Korean War and later worked as an educator in Iowa, California, Minnesota, along with South Dakota, as a teacher, supervisor, and principal.
