= J. P. Duniphan =

American politician (born 1946)

Member of the South Dakota Senate from the 33rd district
- In office 2003–2005

Member of the South Dakota House of Representatives from the 33rd district
- In office 1995–2002

Personal details
- Born: August 31, 1946 (age 79) Rapid City, South Dakota
- Party: Republican
- Profession: Businesswoman

Jeanie P. Duniphan (born August 31, 1946) is an American former politician. She served in the South Dakota Senate from 2003 to 2005 and in the House of Representatives from 1995 to 2002.
