= Alfred J. Burke =

American politician

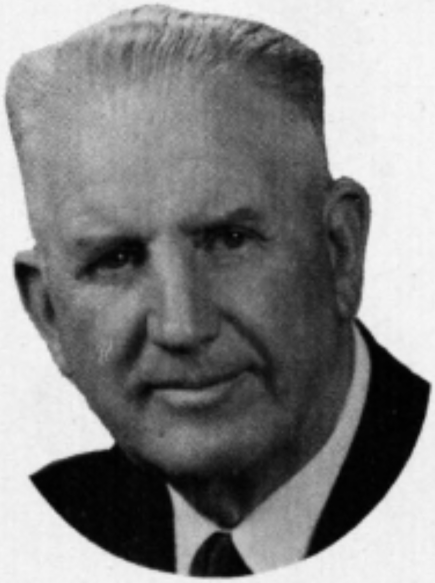
- Burke in 1971

Member of the South Dakota Senate
- In office 1965–1972

Personal details
- Born: October 5, 1897 Lead, South Dakota, U.S.
- Died: October 6, 1988 (aged 91) Sun Prairie, Wisconsin, U.S.
- Party: Independent; Republican

Alfred J. Burke (October 5, 1897 – October 6, 1988) was an American politician. He served as an Independent member of the South Dakota Senate.

== Life and career ==
Burke was born in Lead, South Dakota. He was a rancher.

Burke served in the South Dakota Senate from 1965 to 1972.

Burke died on October 6, 1988 in Sun Prairie, Wisconsin, at the age of 91.
