= Homer Kandaras =

American politician

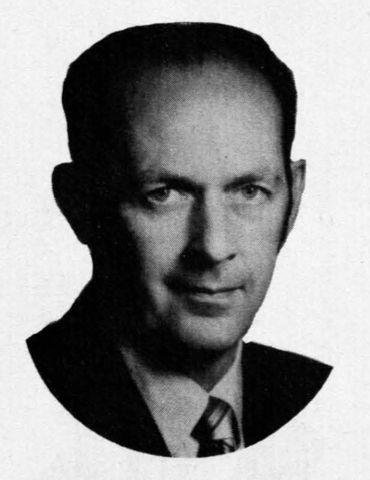

Member of the South Dakota Senate
- In office 1971–1976

Personal details
- Born: August 23, 1929 Aberdeen, South Dakota
- Died: September 25, 2017 (aged 88) Rapid City, South Dakota
- Party: Democratic
- Education: University of South Dakota

Homer M. Kandaras (August 23, 1929 – September 25, 2017) was an American politician in the state of South Dakota. He was a member of the South Dakota State Senate from 1971 to 1976. Throughout his state senate term, he represented the 27th and 28th districts. He is an alumnus of University of South Dakota where he earned his law degree.
