= Gerald F. Lange =

American politician (born 1928)

Member of the South Dakota House of Representatives from the 8th district
- In office 2001–2006
- In office 2009–2010

Member of the South Dakota Senate from the 8th, 10th district
- In office 1991–2000

Personal details
- Born: February 19, 1928 (age 98) Devils Lake, North Dakota, U.S.
- Party: Democratic
- Spouse: Alice
- Children: 4
- Profession: Educator, Organic Farmer, Politician

Gerald Francis Lange (born February 19, 1928) is an American retired politician in the state of South Dakota. He was a member of the South Dakota House of Representatives and South Dakota State Senate. Lange attended the University of North Dakota, Georgetown University, and the University of Navarra. He was a farmer and college teacher at Dakota State University.
