= Frank R. Cock =

American politician (1867–1937)

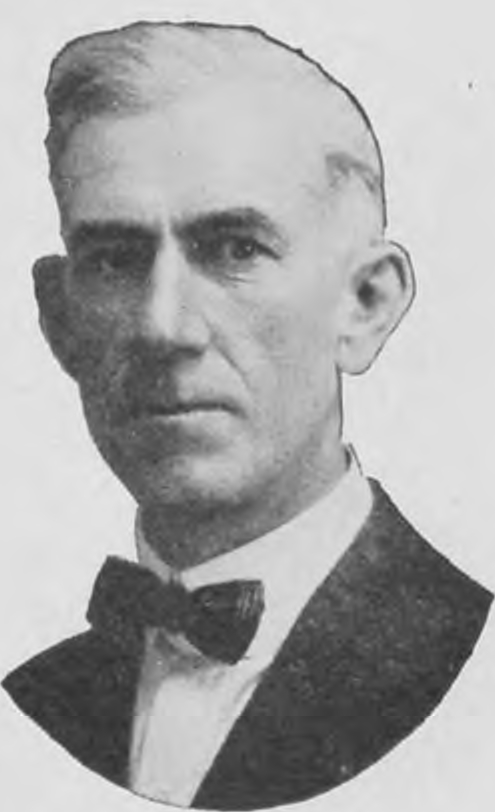
- Official portrait, c. 1921

Member of the South Dakota Senate from the 39th district
- In office 1921 – 1924
- Preceded by: J. C. Milne
- Succeeded by: Leonard M. Simons

Member of the South Dakota House of Representatives from the 48th district
- In office 1919 – 1920

Personal details
- Born: April 30, 1867 Davenport, Iowa, U.S.
- Died: May 2, 1937 (aged 70)
- Party: Republican
- Spouse: Louise C. Teall (m. 1895)
- Children: 2

Frank R. Cock (April 30, 1867 – May 2, 1937) was an American politician and rancher. Born in Davenport, Iowa, he immigrated to Nebraska to work at his uncle's ranch in Central City, later moving to Lincoln County to begin ranching on his own. Cock moved to South Dakota in 1889, settling in Belle Fourche. He was elected to the state's House of Representatives in 1919, serving one term before running for the Senate in 1920. He won, and secured a second term in office in 1922; however, he was unable to achieve a third term in 1924. Cock died on May 2, 1937.

== Life and career ==
Frank R. Cock was born on April 30, 1867, in Davenport, Iowa, to Charles C. Cock and Rebecca Raff. Charles moved from Ohio to Iowa in 1862, and was a member of Davenport's city council. Frank received his preliminary education through the public schools in Davenport, and later went to the Davenport Business College. In 1884, he was employed at his uncle's ranch in Central City, Nebraska; a year later, he moved to Lincoln County, Nebraska, where Frank began ranching on his own. Frank later relocated to Belle Fourche, South Dakota, in 1889, where he opened a grocery store. During this time, he also traveled throughout North and South Dakota, giving provisions to ranchers. He married Louise C. Teall on April 17, 1895. Together, they had two children: Charles C. and Dorothy G. In 1909, he became a board member of the newly created South Dakota state livestock sanitation department. He was the board's secretary from April 1909 to January 1916. According to the 1915 book History of Dakota Territory, at the time of its publication, Cock was the owner of a ranch in Butte County, South Dakota, sized at 1,200 acres (490 ha).

Cock was first elected to the South Dakota Legislature in 1919, serving in the branch's lower chamber, the House of Representatives, representing the 48th district. He won the Republican primary against T. G. Wall and A. L. Gurwell. As representative, he introduced a bill in February 1919 that proposed erecting county hospitals in western South Dakota. The measure was introduced following the Spanish flu epidemic that occurred the previous year, during which larger towns in rural areas were carrying more people than they could handle. The bill was passed by both the House and Senate in March 1915. In 1920, Cock was elected to the Senate, the branch's upper chamber, representing its 39th district, and won re-election in 1922. During his senatorial career, he was chairman of the Senate's highway committee.

In January 1921, he was able to postpone a bill that would have modified laws surrounding animal trespass laws. When the Senate convened again in February, the bill failed to secure a constitutional majority and did not pass. Later in February, Cock proposed a bill that would have prohibited the killing of female deer by hunters, which was supported by the state game and fish protective association. He was also appointed to a special committee to investigate the board of the state livestock sanitation department, which was created in order to analyze the board's affairs beginning in 1913. In January 1923, Cock proposed a bill that would have drawn circuit court juries on the same plan as federal jurors, from either the whole state or larger districts. That same month, he introduced another bill which required that fabric products, such as clothing and blankets, have labels on them that display the percentage of virgin and reworked wool the product contains. Nicknamed the "truth in fabric bill", it was brought down by the House in March.

In February 1923, Cock introduced S. B. 68, a bill that would have provided resources "for the destruction of predatory animals", such as wolves and coyotes, due to the damages they caused to stock raisers. The bill initially received objection from fellow legislators due to the appropriations that would have been required for an increase in the state game warden's salary, but that section was cut from the bill soon after. After several discussions lasting multiple weeks, the bill was eventually passed by the Senate in February, and then the House the following month. In its final rendition, the measure employed hunters and trappers across western South Dakota to exterminate the predatory animals. However, when the bill was passed, there was a defect with the bill: the name of the act referred to sections 1040 to 1047 of the South Dakota Compiled Laws, which covers usury laws, while the body discusses sections 10340 to 10347, which covers wolf bounties. Because of this defect, according to a Sioux Falls lawyer, the bill was void and did not go into effect. In early January 1924, Cock filed for a third term in office, although as an independent Republican after losing the Butte County Republican endorsement to Leonard M. Simons. He was endorsed by the Capital Journal of Pierre. Simons ended up defeating Cock in the primary, receiving 1,214 votes to Cock's 1,180.

In 1934, upon the organization of the Belle Fourche-Lemmon production credit association, Cock served as acting chairman. He later became an inspector for the association. Cock died on May 2, 1937, and his funeral was held two days later on May 4 at the Masonic Temple in Belle Fourche.
