= James B. Dunn =

American politician

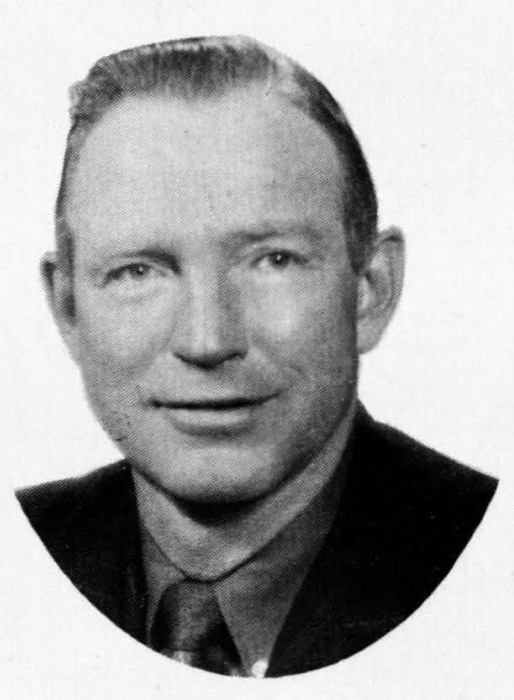

Member of the South Dakota Senate
- In office 1973–2000

Personal details
- Born: James Bernard Dunn; June 27, 1927 Lead, South Dakota
- Died: August 11, 2016 (aged 89) Sturgis, South Dakota
- Party: Republican
- Education: Black Hills State University

James Bernard Dunn (June 27, 1927 – August 11, 2016) was an American politician in the state of South Dakota. He was a member of the South Dakota Senate from 1973 to 2000. Throughout his state senate term, he represented the 26th and 31st districts. He was an alumnus of Black Hills State University and a veteran in the United States Army. He also sat briefly in the South Dakota House of Representatives from 1971 to 1972. Dunn died on August 11, 2016, at the age of 89.
