= Randy Frederick =

American politician

Member of the South Dakota Senate from the 6th district
- In office January 12, 1993 – January 9, 2001
- Succeeded by: Brock Greenfield

Member of the South Dakota House of Representatives from the 8th district
- In office September 23, 1989 – January 12, 1993

Personal details
- Born: April 23, 1956 (age 70) Watertown, South Dakota
- Party: Republican

Randy Frederick (born April 23, 1956) is an American politician who served in the South Dakota House of Representatives from the 8th district from 1989 to 1993 and in the South Dakota Senate from the 6th district from 1993 to 2001.
