= B. F. Morgan =

American politician

Bernard Francis Morgan (August 12, 1858 – January 26, 1922) was a member of the South Dakota Senate.

== Biography ==
B.F. Morgan was born on August 12, 1858, in Seymour, Wisconsin. He was married to Margaret McComish. Morgan died on January 26, 1922, in Wagner, Wisconsin.

== Career ==
Morgan was elected mayor of Shullsburg, Wisconsin, in 1894. He was a member of the South Dakota Senate from 1911 to 1914. Additionally, he was a delegate to the 1916 Democratic National Convention.
