= G. Homer Harding =

American politician (born 1925)

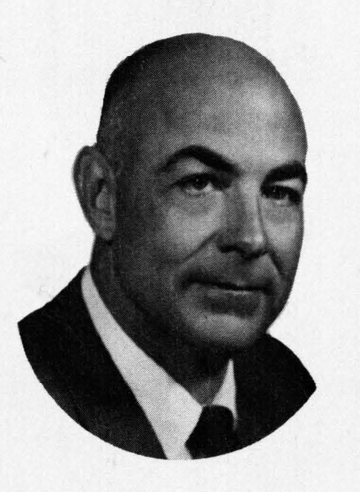

Member of the South Dakota Senate
- In office 1971–1992

Personal details
- Born: December 7, 1925 (age 100) Pierre, South Dakota, U.S.
- Party: Republican
- Spouse: Patricia Binkley (m. 1947; died. 2025)
- Children: 4
- Education: University of South Dakota

Guy Homer Harding (born December 7, 1925) is an American former politician in the state of South Dakota. He was a member of the South Dakota State Senate from 1971 to 1988. Throughout his state senate term, he represented the 19th, 22nd, 23rd, and 24th districts. He was also Treasurer of South Dakota from 1991 to 1995. Harding, a Republican, is a veteran of World War II and Korean War, serving in the US Army. He reached the rank of brigadier general and was later Assistant Adjutant General of South Dakota. He is an alumnus of the University of South Dakota and was a car dealer. Harding is also a past president of the Pierre Chamber of Commerce and former member of the Pierre School Board.
