= Wallace B. Hanson =

American politician

Member of the South Dakota Senate
- In office 1981–1990

Personal details
- Born: March 23, 1924 Oldham, South Dakota, U.S.
- Died: February 1, 2008 (aged 83)
- Party: Republican
- Education: South Dakota State University

Wallace B. Hanson (March 23, 1924 – February 1, 2008) was an American politician. He served as a Republican member of the South Dakota Senate.

== Life and career ==
Hanson was born in Oldham, South Dakota. He attended Oldham High School, South Dakota State University and Wisconsin School of Banking.

Hanson was a banker.

Hanson served in the South Dakota Senate from 1981 to 1990.

Hanson died on February 1, 2008, at the age of 83.
