= Vale P. Thielman =

American politician

Member of the South Dakota Senate from the 6th district
- In office 1889–1890
- Preceded by: none
- Succeeded by: Albert L. Peterman

Personal details
- Born: October 10, 1843 Germany
- Died: February 21, 1925 (aged 81) Los Angeles, California
- Party: Republican
- Spouse: Sarah J. Black
- Children: one

Valentine "Vale" P. Thielman (October 10, 1843 – February 21, 1925) was an American politician. He served in the South Dakota State Senate from 1889 to 1890. He also sat in the Dakota Territory Legislature from 1881 to 1882.
