= A. Williamson =

American politician

Member of the South Dakota Senate
- In office 1909–1910

Personal details
- Party: Republican

A. Williamson was an American politician. A member of the Republican Party, he served in the South Dakota Senate from 1909 to 1910.
