= James E. Newland =

American politician

James E. Newland (March 1830 – 12 May 1907) was a United States Republican politician. He served as a member of the South Dakota State Senate in 1893.
