= Grace Mickelson =

American politician (1926–2018)

Member of the South Dakota Senate
- In office 1972–1976

Personal details
- Born: Grace Maxine Erdahl; May 22, 1926 Lincoln Twp., Winnebago, Iowa
- Died: November 30, 2018 (aged 92) Rapid City, South Dakota
- Party: Democratic
- Spouse: John C. Mickelson
- Education: University of Iowa
- Profession: Teacher

Grace Maxine Mickelson (/ˈmaɪkəlsən/ MY-kəl-sən; née Erdahl; May 22, 1926 – November 20, 2018) was an American politician. She served in the South Dakota Senate from 1972 to 1976.

Mickelson died in Rapid City in 2018.
