= R. H. McCaughey =

American politician

Robert H. McCaughey (November 4, 1861 – October 22, 1924) was a South Dakota politician.

McCaughey was born in Dane County, Wisconsin. He was a member of the South Dakota House of Representatives from 1895 to 1898 and of the South Dakota Senate from 1903 to 1906. In addition, he was treasurer of Spink County, South Dakota from 1891 to 1894. He was a Republican. He died in Kasson, Minnesota.
