= Lyndell Petersen =

American politician (1931–2025)

Member of the South Dakota Senate
- In office 1977–1994

Personal details
- Born: July 4, 1931 Hay Springs, Nebraska
- Died: June 10, 2025 (aged 93)
- Party: Republican
- Spouse: Jill Louise Wendling
- Children: Two
- Education: South Dakota State University
- Occupation: Rancher

Lyndell Hans Petersen (July 4, 1931 – June 10, 2025) was an American politician. He served in the South Dakota Senate from 1977 to 1994. He was a Pennington County Commissioner from 2011 to 2016. In 2019, he was inducted into the South Dakota Hall of Fame.
