= Dick Hainje =

American politician

Member of the South Dakota Senate from the 11th district
- In office January 14, 1997 – November 12, 2001
- Succeeded by: Rebekah Cradduck

Personal details
- Born: August 11, 1956 (age 70) Sioux Falls, South Dakota
- Party: Republican

Dick Hainje (born August 11, 1956) is an American politician who served in the South Dakota Senate from the 11th district from 1997 to 2001.
