= Paul Valandra =

American politician

Member of the South Dakota Senate from the 27th district
- In office 1991–2000

Member of the South Dakota House of Representatives from the 27th district
- In office 2001–2006

Personal details
- Born: June 6, 1953 (age 73) Cumberland, North Carolina
- Party: Democratic
- Spouse: Cheryl Three Stars
- Profession: Tribal administrator

Clement Paul Valandra (born June 6, 1953) is an American former politician. He served in the South Dakota House of Representatives from 2001 to 2006 and in the South Dakota Senate from 1991 to 2000.
