= Jerome Mayer =

American politician (1931–2024)

Member of the South Dakota Senate
- In office 1973–1976
- In office 1977–1980

Personal details
- Born: February 22, 1931
- Died: April 28, 2024 (aged 93)
- Party: Democratic
- Education: Augustana College; University of Nebraska; University of Northern Iowa; University of South Dakota

Jerome Mayer (February 22, 1931 – April 28, 2024) was an American politician. He served as a Democratic member of the South Dakota Senate.

== Life and career ==
Mayer attended Augustana College, the University of Nebraska, the University of Northern Iowa and the University of South Dakota.

Mayer served in the South Dakota Senate from 1973 to 1976 and again from 1977 to 1980.

Mayer died on April 28, 2024, at the age of 93.
