= Harold Halverson =

American politician

Member of the South Dakota Senate from the 4th district
- In office January 11, 1977 – January 9, 2001
- Succeeded by: Larry Diedrich

Member of the South Dakota House of Representatives from the 6th district
- In office January 12, 1971 – January 9, 1973

Personal details
- Born: November 24, 1926 Burke, South Dakota
- Died: February 20, 2002 (aged 75) Sioux Falls, South Dakota
- Party: Republican

Harold Halverson (November 24, 1926 – February 20, 2002) was an American politician who served in the South Dakota House of Representatives from the 6th district from 1971 to 1973 and in the South Dakota Senate from the 4th district from 1977 to 2001.

He died of leukemia on February 20, 2002, in Sioux Falls, South Dakota at age 75.
