= Ervin E. Dupper =

American politician

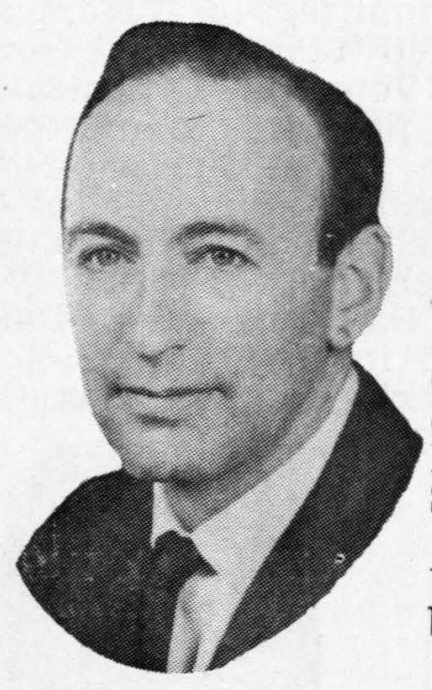

Member of the South Dakota Senate
- In office 1965–1968

Personal details
- Born: Ervin Emil Dupper; January 8, 1923 Campbell County, South Dakota
- Died: May 28, 2017 (aged 94) Rapid City, South Dakota
- Party: Republican
- Education: University of Oregon; University of South Dakota (JD)

Ervin Emil Dupper (January 8, 1923 – May 28, 2017) was an American politician in the state of South Dakota.

== Career ==
He was a member of the South Dakota Senate from 1965 to 1968. Throughout his state senate term, he represented the 21st and 23rd districts. He attended the University of Oregon where he earned a bachelor's degree in political science, and then attended the University of South Dakota School of Law for a law degree. He served a brief stint as State Attorney of Walworth County in 1955 to 1956 prior to his election to the state senate.
