= Wendell H. Hanson =

American politician

Member of the South Dakota Senate
- In office 1977–1978
- In office 1981–1982

Personal details
- Born: August 4, 1919 Sioux Falls, South Dakota, U.S.
- Died: June 15, 2021 (aged 101)
- Party: Republican
- Education: Augustana College; University of Texas; University of Michigan

Wendell H. Hanson (August 4, 1919 – June 15, 2021) was an American politician. He served as a Republican member of the South Dakota Senate.

== Life and career ==
Hanson was born in Sioux Falls, South Dakota. He attended Washington High School, Augustana College, the University of Texas and the University of Michigan.

Hanson served in the South Dakota Senate from 1977 to 1978 and again from 1981 to 1982.

Hanson died on June 15, 2021, at the age of 101.
