= Adolph W. Ewert =

American politician

Adolph W. Ewert (June 18, 1865 in Burr Oak, Wisconsin – June 17, 1935 in Pierre, South Dakota) was a politician in the state of South Dakota.

== Biography ==
Ewert was born on June 18, 1865, to Edward and Mina Ewert in La Crosse County, Wisconsin. On September 30, 1890, he married Carrie E. Dutcher. He was Baptist.

== Career ==
Ewert was a delegate to the 1908 Republican National Convention. Later he served as a member of the South Dakota State Senate. From 1913 to 1917, Ewert was the Treasurer of South Dakota.
