= Doris Miner =

American politician from South Dakota (born 1936)

Doris P. Miner

Member of the South Dakota Senate
- In office 1979–1992

Member of the South Dakota House of Representatives
- In office 1977–1978

Personal details
- Born: March 13, 1936 (age 90) Dallas, South Dakota
- Party: Democratic
- Spouse: Kenneth Miner
- Children: four
- Profession: Rancher/Insurance Agent

Doris P. Miner (born March 13, 1936) is an American former politician. She served in the South Dakota House of Representatives from 1977 to 1978 and in the Senate from 1979 to 1992.
