= Alan Aker =

American politician

Member of the South Dakota Senate from the 35th district
- In office January 10, 1995 – January 12, 1999
- Succeeded by: Cheryl Madden

Personal details
- Born: October 10, 1963 (age 62) Rapid City, South Dakota
- Party: Republican

Alan Aker (born October 10, 1963) is an American politician who served in the South Dakota Senate from the 35th district from 1995 to 1999.
