= Fred Whiting =

American politician from South Dakota (born 1938)

Member of the South Dakota Senate
- In office 1995–2002

Member of the South Dakota House of Representatives
- In office 1993–1994

Personal details
- Born: December 14, 1938 (age 87) Chicago, Illinois
- Party: Republican
- Children: one
- Profession: Advertising and Public Relations

Fred C. Whiting (born December 14, 1938) is an American former politician. He served in the South Dakota House of Representatives from 1993 to 1994 and in the Senate from 1995 to 2002.
