= Keith Paisley =

American politician

Member of the South Dakota Senate from the 12th district
- In office January 8, 1985 – January 9, 2001
- Succeeded by: John R. McIntyre

Member of the South Dakota House of Representatives from the 11th district
- In office January 13, 1981 – January 8, 1985

Personal details
- Born: December 29, 1928 Minneapolis, Minnesota
- Died: May 31, 2011 (aged 82) Sioux Falls, South Dakota
- Party: Republican

Keith Paisley (December 29, 1928 – May 31, 2011) was an American politician who served in the South Dakota House of Representatives from the 11th district from 1981 to 1985 and in the South Dakota Senate from the 12th district from 1985 to 2001.

He died on May 31, 2011, in Sioux Falls, South Dakota at age 82.
