= Kenneth D. Albers =

American politician

Member of the South Dakota Senate from the 31st district
- In office 2007–2008
- In office 1997–2004

Personal details
- Born: March 17, 1941 (age 85) Lennox, South Dakota
- Party: Republican
- Spouse: Louise
- Relations: (Sister) Harriet Martin
- Children: one
- Profession: businessman, sheriff

Kenneth D. Albers (born March 17, 1941) is an American former politician. He served in the South Dakota Senate from 1997 to 2004 and from 2007 to 2008.
