= Julie Bartling =

American politician

Member of the South Dakota Senate from the 26th district
- In office 2004–present

Personal details
- Born: July 1, 1958 (age 68) Burke, South Dakota
- Party: Democratic
- Spouse: Bart
- Occupation: auditor, business owner

Julie A. Bartling (born July 1, 1958) is a Democratic member of the South Dakota Senate, representing the 26th district since 2004. Previously she was a member of the South Dakota House of Representatives from 2000 through 2004.

== Education ==
Julie Bartling received her education from the following institution:

- Diploma, Burke High School, 1976

== Political experience ==
Julie Bartling has had the following political experience:

- Candidate, South Dakota House of Representatives, District 21, 2012
- Candidate, South Dakota State Auditor, 2010
- Senator, South Dakota State Senate, 2004-2010
- Representative, South Dakota State House, 2000-2004

== Caucuses/Non-Legislative Committees ==
Julie Bartling has been a member of the following committees:

- Director, Farmer Agricultural Mortgage Corporation, 2003–present

== Professional Experience ==
Julie Bartling has had the following professional experience:

- Auditor, Gregory County, South Dakota, 1983-2001
- Appointed Deputy Auditor, Gregory County, South Dakota, 1981-1983
- Business Owner

== Organizations ==
Julie Bartling has been a member of the following organizations:

- Director, RITE Team Association, 2002–present
- Member, Herrick American Legion Auxiliary, Post #220, 1976–present
- President, South Dakota Association of County Officials, 1999-2000
- 1st Vice President, South Dakota Association of County Officials, 1998-1999
- 2nd Vice President, South Dakota Association of County Officials, 1997-1998
- Board Member, South Dakota Association of County Officials, 1994-1997

Party political offices
| Vacant Title last held by Dick Butler | Democratic nominee for State Auditor of South Dakota; 2010 | Vacant Title next held by Tom Cool |
