= William Garner Waddel =

American politician

Member of the South Dakota Senate
- In office 1919–1923

Personal details
- Born: June 29, 1870 Grant County, Wisconsin
- Died: January 27, 1937 (aged 67) Webster, South Dakota
- Party: Republican
- Children: 5
- Education: University of South Dakota (LLB)

William Garner Waddel (June 29, 1870 – January 27, 1937) was an American attorney, politician, and inventor who served as a member of the South Dakota Senate.

== Early life and education ==
Waddel was born on June 29, 1870, in Grant County, Wisconsin. He later moved to Plymouth County, Iowa. Waddel attended Westmar University before joining the faculty of the University of South Dakota. Later, he graduated from the University of South Dakota School of Law in 1904.

== Career ==
Waddel practiced law in a partnership with Frank Anderson from 1906 to 1919. Waddel patented a golf bag stand in 1933.

Waddel served as a member of the South Dakota Senate from 1919 to 1923. Additionally, he was State's Attorney of Day County, South Dakota, and Mayor of Webster, South Dakota. In 1936, Waddel became a county judge and remained so until his death. He was a Republican.

== Personal life ==
On July 3, 1900, Waddel married Eliza Matilda Otis. They had five children. Waddel died on January 27, 1937, in Webster, South Dakota. He was a Methodist.
