= Gil Koetzle =

American politician

Member of the South Dakota Senate from the 15th district
- In office 1993–2008

Personal details
- Born: May 22, 1952 Sioux Falls, South Dakota
- Died: January 10, 2013 (aged 60) Sioux Falls, South Dakota
- Party: Democratic
- Spouse: Deb Phelps
- Education: O'Gorman High School
- Occupation: Expert union contract negotiator, retired firefighter, Sioux Falls Fire Department

Gilbert "Gil" Koetzle was a Democratic member of the South Dakota Senate, representing the 15th district between 2001 and 2008. He also represented a House District between 1993 and 2000. He committed suicide on January 10, 2013, one day after a search of his house turned up images of child pornography in his email as well as six bags of marijuana and also associated paraphernalia.
