= Martin E. Conlan =

American politician

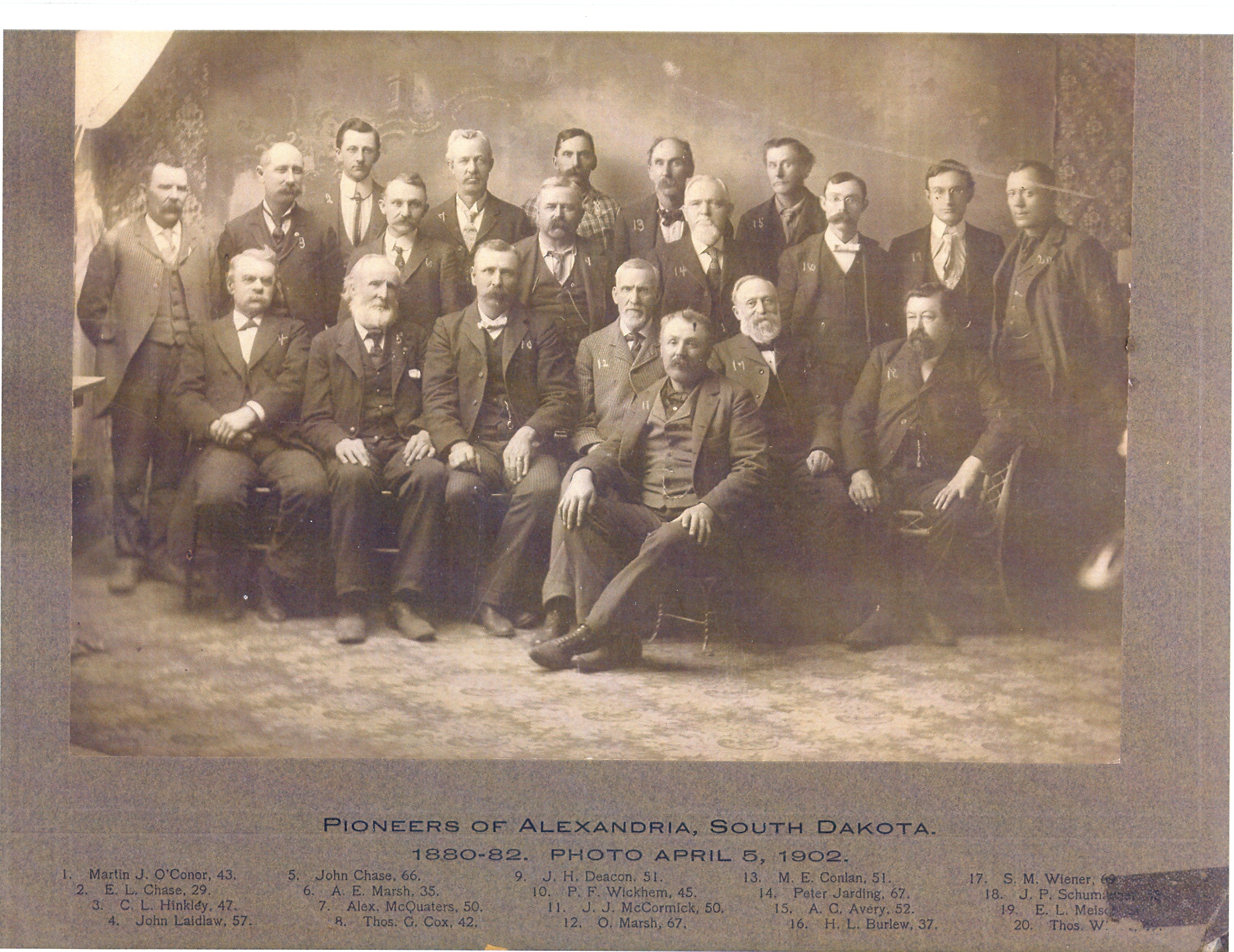
Pioneers of Alexandria, South Dakota 1880–82, Photo April 5, 1902, (Martin E. Conlan with #13, last row)

Martin E. Conlan (c. 1849 – September 20, 1923) was a Democratic state legislator in South Dakota. He lived in Alexandria, South Dakota, Hanson County, South Dakota, for most of his life, but he was born in Raymond, Wisconsin, and was of Irish ancestry. He was educated in the public schools, and made his way to Dakota Territory in 1880 where he went into the flour and feed business. Martin was also a real estate dealer and the owner of a gravel pit and several farms. He served as postmaster, a member of the Alexandria city council and board of education. In 1888, Conlan was elected to serve in the first South Dakota State Senate for the term from 1889 to 1890 and was elected to serve again from 1893 to 1894. He and his wife Johanna had seven children, only the following names were known: Mary, Fred, Nellie, Eileen and Bessie. Conlan died in Sioux Falls, South Dakota on September 20, 1923.
