= Charlie Flowers (politician) =

American politician

Member of the South Dakota Senate from the 21st district
- In office 1989–2000

Member of the South Dakota House of Representatives from the 21st district
- In office 2001–2002

Personal details
- Born: August 28, 1939 (age 86) Dougherty, Iowa
- Party: Democratic
- Spouse: Aleta
- Children: three
- Profession: Real Estate, Trucking

Charles E. Flowers (born February 28, 1939) is an American former politician. He served in the South Dakota House of Representatives from 2001 to 2002 and in the Senate from 1989 to 2000.
