= Sheldon Songstad =

American politician

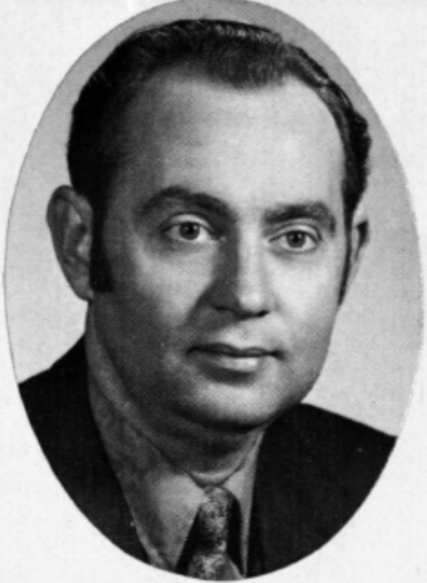
- Songstad in 1971

Member of the South Dakota Senate
- In office 1975–1978; 1985–1988

Member of the South Dakota House of Representatives
- In office 1971–1974

Personal details
- Born: June 19, 1938 Sioux Falls, South Dakota, U.S.
- Died: December 13, 2019 (aged 81)
- Party: Republican
- Spouse: Barbara L. Fitzgerald
- Children: four
- Profession: Advertising and Public Relations

Sheldon R. Songstad (June 19, 1938 – December 13, 2019) was an American politician. He served in the South Dakota House of Representatives from 1971 to 1974 and in the Senate from 1975 to 1978 and 1985 to 1988.

Songstad died in December 2019, at the age of 81.
