= C. S. Amsden =

American politician

C. S. Amsden (March 26, 1856 – August 6, 1943) was president pro tempore of the South Dakota Senate and speaker pro tempore of the South Dakota House of Representatives.

== Biography ==
Amsden was born on March 26, 1856, in Janesville, Wisconsin. He attended Carleton College.

On January 5, 1881, Amsden married Lois L. Morton. They had two children before her death from tuberculosis on June 22, 1882. On July 3, 1884, he married Julia Smith. They had four children before her death on May 12, 1926. Amsden died on August 6, 1943, in Milbank, South Dakota.

== Career ==
From 1885 to 1888, Amsden was Superintendent of Schools of Grant County, Dakota Territory. He was then twice a member of the Senate. First, from 1905 to 1906 and second from 1909 to 1928, serving as President pro tempore from 1915 to 1928. Later, Amsden was a member of the House of Representatives three times. First, from 1931 to 1932, serving as Speaker pro tempore in 1931. He was later a member again from 1935 to 1938 and from 1941 to 1942. Amsden was a Republican.
