= Richard W. Waddell =

American politician

Member of the South Dakota Senate from the 22nd, 27th district
- In office 1983–1990

Personal details
- Born: May 16, 1922 Merriman, Nebraska
- Died: October 27, 2016 (aged 94) Isabel, South Dakota
- Party: Democratic
- Spouse: Martha Furher
- Children: three
- Profession: Real Estate Broker/Rancher

Richard William Waddell (May 16, 1922 – October 27, 2016) was an American politician in the state of South Dakota. He was a member of the South Dakota State Senate, representing the 22nd district (1983–84) and the 27th district (1984–90). He was a real estate broker and rancher.
