= 2026 Sioux Falls mayoral election =

Local election in South Dakota, US

- June 2, 2026 (first round); June 23, 2026 (runoff)

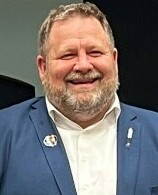
Candidate	Christine Erickson	Jamie Smith
First round	14,407; 37.20%	10,959; 28.29%
Runoff	18,281; 49.92%	18,277; 49.91%
Candidate	Greg Jamison	Joe Batcheller
First round	7,081; 18.28%	5,663; 14.62%
Runoff	Eliminated	Eliminated
Mayor before election
Paul TenHaken
Nonpartisan
Elected mayor
Christine Erickson
Nonpartisan

The 2026 Sioux Falls mayoral election took place on June 2, 2026, to elect the mayor of Sioux Falls, South Dakota. As no candidate received a majority of the vote, a runoff election took place on June 23. Incumbent mayor Paul TenHaken was term-limited and unable to run for a third consecutive term.

This election was the first to take place following the passage of House Bill 1130 in 2025, which required that municipal elections be consolidated with the statewide primary or general election. Former city councilmember and state representative Christine Erickson placed first in the primary, winning 37 percent of the vote. State senator and former governor candidate Jamie Smith placed second with 28 percent, and both advanced to the general election. An initial count of the runoff round saw Republican Erickson lead Smith by two votes, and the counting of provisional ballots also maintained a gap of two votes. The close result made the election eligible for a recount. The recount resulted in a slight increase in Ericksen's margin to four votes, after which she was declared the winner.

== Candidates ==
=== Advanced to runoff ===
- Christine Erickson, former city councilmember and state representative
- Jamie Smith, state senator and 2022 Democratic gubernatorial nominee

=== Eliminated ===
- Joe Batcheller, businessman (endorsed Smith)
- Greg Jamison, state representative from the 12th district (2017–2019, 2021–present) and mayoral candidate in 2014 and 2018 (endorsed Smith)
- David Zokaites, data analyst and 2022 mayoral candidate

=== Withdrawn ===
- Marshall Selberg, former city councilmember (endorsed Erickson)

== Endorsements ==
Christine Erickson

Statewide officials

- Marty Jackley, attorney general of South Dakota (2009–2019, 2023–present)

State legislators

- Doug Barthel, former state representative from the 10th district (2017–2023)

Local officials

- Marshall Selberg, former city councilmember (2016–2024) and former mayoral candidate

Individuals

- Toby Doeden, businessman and 2026 Republican gubernatorial candidate

Political parties

- South Dakota Republican Party
Jamie Smith

State legislators

- Greg Jamison, state representative from the 12th district (2017–2019, 2021–present) and former mayoral candidate

Individuals

- Joe Batcheller, businessman and former mayoral candidate

== Campaign ==
=== Announcements and ballot access ===
Christine Erickson, a former city councilmember and state representative, announced her campaign on July 23, 2025, at Cherapa Place in Sioux Falls. At her launch event, Erickson emphasized practical leadership, public safety, collaboration, and economic growth. She also cited her record on the city council, including support for police overtime funding, workforce development investments at Southeast Technical College and the University of South Dakota Discovery District, and a property tax refund program for low-income and disabled residents.

Joe Batcheller, the former president of Downtown Sioux Falls, announced his candidacy on August 26, 2025, at Cherapa Place plaza. Batcheller presented his background as an urban planner and Downtown Sioux Falls president as central to his campaign and advocated improved public transit, additional housing, affordability, and neighborhood development. Although the election was nonpartisan, he described himself as an independent candidate in a field that included candidates with Republican and Democratic political backgrounds. In February 2026, Batcheller became the first candidate to qualify for the municipal ballot after submitting nearly 300 petition signatures, more than the 200 required.

Marshall Selberg, a former city councilmember from the Southwest District, launched his campaign on October 15, 2025, at the South Dakota Military Heritage Alliance. Selberg emphasized his experience in local government and described housing, public safety, and economic development as campaign priorities. He also referred to the Operation Hope Fund, a program he had supported as a councilmember to use COVID-19 relief funds for patients at The Link, and said he wanted to expand the program if elected mayor. At the time of his announcement, Selberg was the fifth person to officially file for the election, joining Erickson, Batcheller, Jamie Smith, and David Zokaites.

=== Public safety forum ===
On May 5, 2026, Batcheller, Erickson, Greg Jamison, Smith, and Zokaites participated in a public safety forum at the Military Heritage Alliance Museum. The event was hosted by The Dakota Scout and SiouxFallsLive.com and focused on labor negotiations, addiction recovery funding, expanded surveillance, cooperation with surrounding communities, and parole reform following the shooting of a Sioux Falls police officer by a parolee in April 2026.

During the forum, the candidates discussed state and local responses to parole violations and recidivism. Smith cited his work on a state prison reset task force, Jamison said the legislature had been slow to address parole issues, Batcheller argued that parole boards needed greater ability to consider recidivism, and Erickson referred to her work on legislation related to bail and habitual offenders. The candidates also addressed funding for The Link, a community triage and sobering center, and the use of surveillance technology in Sioux Falls. Erickson supported additional fixed license plate reader cameras, while Batcheller expressed concern about misuse of public safety investments. Smith and Jamison supported cameras as tools to improve police efficiency and neighborhood safety, and Zokaites said security camera data should remain under local control. All candidates said they accepted the existing labor negotiation agreement with police, firefighters, and municipal employees.

== Results ==
=== General election ===
2026 Sioux Falls mayoral election
Candidate	Votes	%
Christine Erickson	14,407	37.20%
Jamie Smith	10,959	28.29%
Greg Jamison	7,081	18.28%
Joe Batcheller	5,663	14.62%
David Zokaites	623	1.61%
Total votes	38,733	100.00%

=== Runoff election ===
2026 Sioux Falls mayoral runoff election
Candidate	Votes	%
Christine Erickson	18,281	49.92%
Jamie Smith	18,277	49.91%
Total votes	36,558	100.00%
