= 2010 Sioux Falls mayoral election =

- April 13, 2010; April 27, 2010
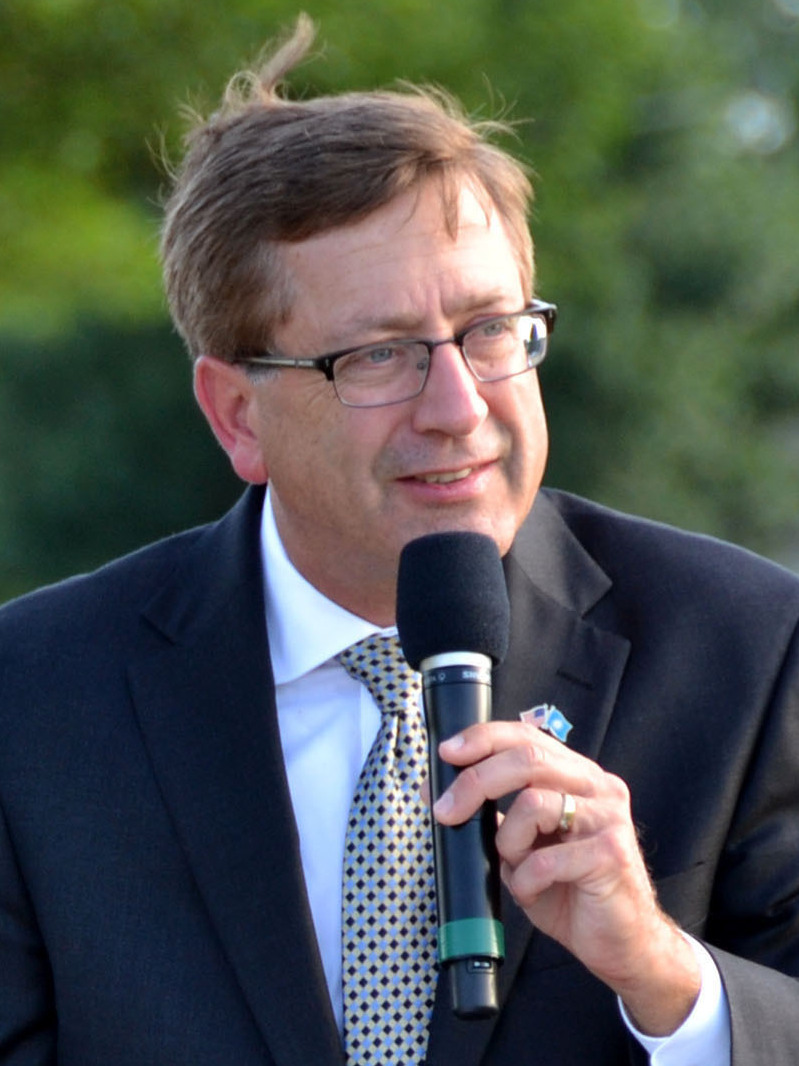

Candidate	Mike Huether	Kermit Staggers
First round	7,315; 24.71%	7,364; 24.87%
Runoff	18,264; 56.66%	13,969; 43.34%
Candidate	Vernon Brown	J. Pat Costello
First round	5,926; 20.02%	4,829; 16.31%
Runoff	Eliminated	Eliminated
Mayor before election
Dave Munson
Nonpartisan
Elected mayor
Mike Huether
Nonpartisan

The 2010 Sioux Falls mayoral election took place on April 27, 2010, following a primary election on April 13, 2010. Incumbent Mayor Dave Munson was term-limited and could not run for a third consecutive term. Six candidates ran to succeed him, with City Councilmember Kermit Staggers narrowly placing first in the primary with 24.9 percent of the vote, followed by former bank executive Mike Huether, who won 24.7 percent. In the ensuing general election, Huether defeated Staggers by a wide margin, winning his first term, 57–43 percent.

== Primary election ==
=== Candidates ===
- Kermit Staggers, City Councilmember, former State Senator
- Mike Huether, former bank executive
- Vernon Brown, City Councilmember, 2006 candidate for Mayor
- J. Pat Costello, City Councilmember
- Bill Peterson, former State House Majority Leader
- Janoct Ajda, pipeline worker, businessman

=== Results ===
2010 Sioux Falls mayoral primary election
Party	Candidate	Votes	%
Nonpartisan	Kermit Staggers	7,364	24.87%
Nonpartisan	Mike Huether	7,315	24.71%
Nonpartisan	Vernon Brown	5,926	20.02%
Nonpartisan	J. Pat Costello	4,829	16.31%
Nonpartisan	Bill Peterson	4,015	13.56%
Nonpartisan	Janoct Ajda	156	0.53%
Total votes		29,605	100.00%

== General election ==
=== Results ===
2010 Sioux Falls mayoral runoff election
Party	Candidate	Votes	%
Nonpartisan	Mike Huether	18,264	56.66%
Nonpartisan	Kermit Staggers	13,969	43.34%
Total votes		32,233	100.00%
