= Flag of Sioux Falls, South Dakota =

American city flag

City of Sioux Falls
- Use: Civil and state flag
- Proportion: 3:5
- Adopted: July 10, 2018; 8 years ago
- Design: A zigzag pattern of thin white and blue lines, which divides an upper blue portion and a lower pinkish-red portion, and a yellow sun in the upper left corner
- Designed by: Max Rabkin

The flag of Sioux Falls consists of a zigzag pattern of thin white and blue lines, which divides an upper blue portion and a lower pinkish-red portion, and a yellow sun in the upper left corner. The zigzag represents the namesake falls of the Big Sioux River. The blue color and the sun allude to the flag of South Dakota. The pinkish-red portion represents the Sioux Quartzite nearby. The upward direction of the design represents the growth of Sioux Falls. The red, white and blue colors included in the flag are also a reference to the flag of the United States while maintaining city and state pride.

In 2004, the North American Vexillological Association (NAVA) rated the design of flags from the 100 largest cities in the U.S., all 50 state capitals and at least two cities per state. Sioux Falls did not have an entry in the rating because it did not have a flag.

The flag of Sioux Falls was designed in 2014 by Max Rabkin. It was chosen as the winner of a design competition for both the "Best in Show" by a panel of experts and the "People's Choice" award. The city officially adopted the flag in 2018. In a 2022 NAVA survey, the flag received an A grade and was rated in the top 25 of over 300 flags introduced since 2015.

== Design ==
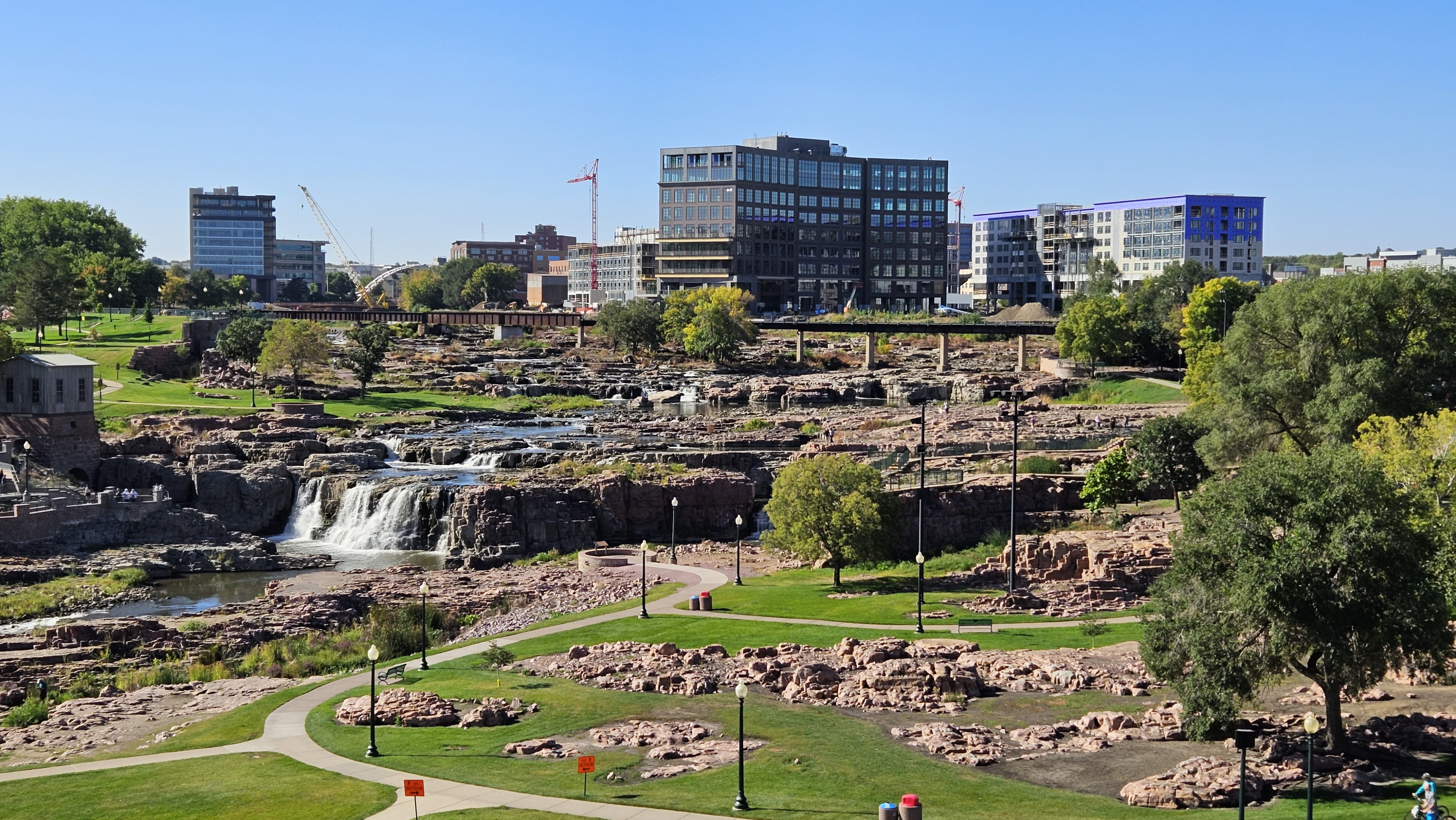
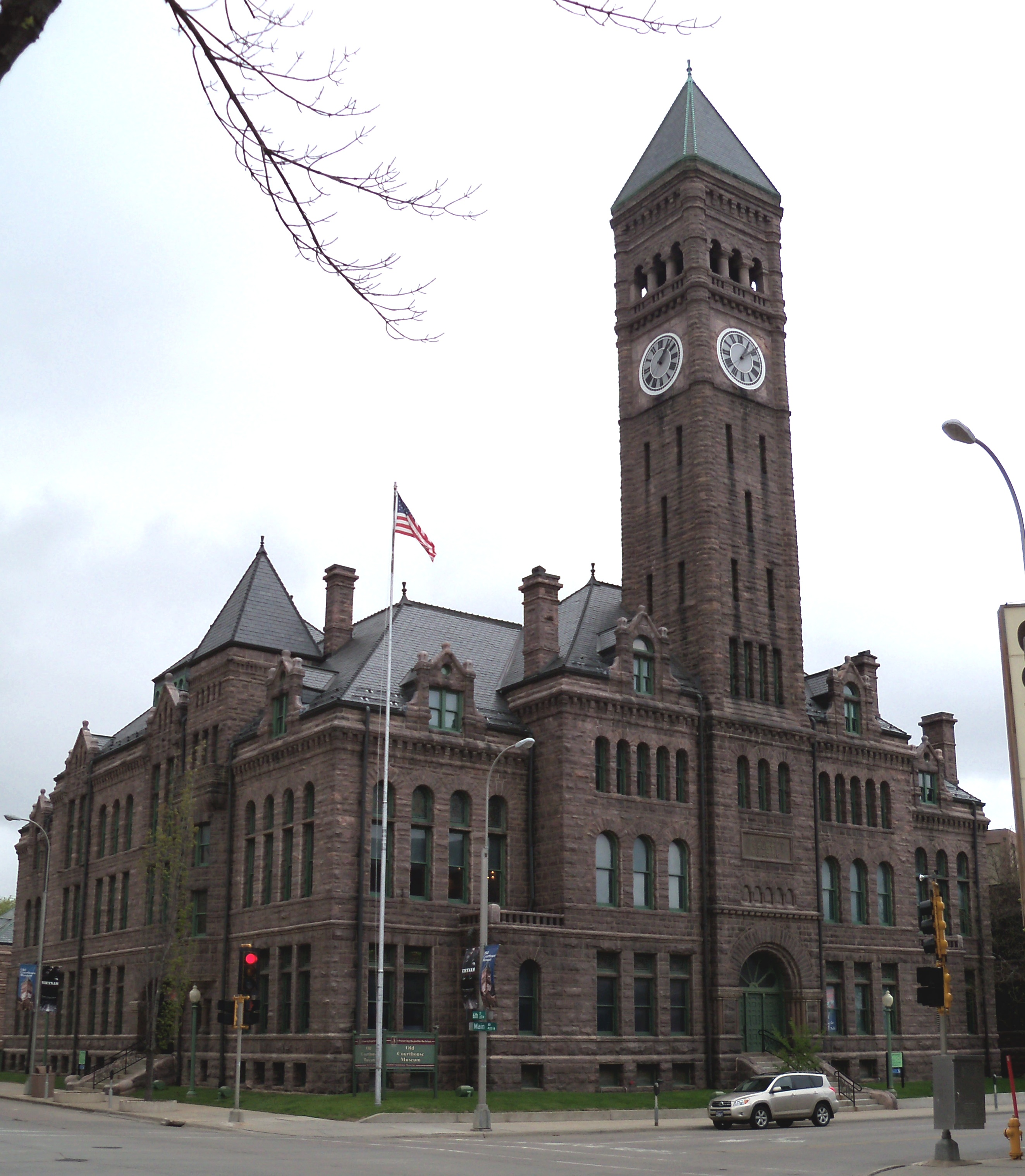
The flag of Sioux Falls alludes to the namesake falls of the Big Sioux River (left), the flag of South Dakota (center) and Sioux Quartzite like that used in the Old Minnehaha County Courthouse (right).

The flag of Sioux Falls, South Dakota, has a 3:5 ratio and consists of:

- a zigzag pattern of thin white and blue lines. This pattern represents the namesake falls of the Big Sioux River. The falls run in an ascending direction which represents the growth of Sioux Falls.
- an upper blue portion that alludes to the blue field on the flag of South Dakota.
- a yellow sun in the upper left corner. This sun is a symbol from the flag of South Dakota because the state was formerly nicknamed "The Sunshine State".
- a lower pinkish-red portion over which the falls run. This represents the Sioux Quartzite quarried nearby and used to build early Sioux Falls buildings. This quartzite is recognized as part of the city's heritage and was used in the construction of almost all of the important early buildings including the Federal Building and U.S. Courthouse, Old Minnehaha County Courthouse and the Carnegie Free Public Library. The local quarries were used in the late 19th and early 20th centuries and the stone was not used for building after the quarries closed in the 1920s.

The red, white and blue colors included in the flag are also a reference to the flag of the United States while maintaining city and state pride.

== History ==
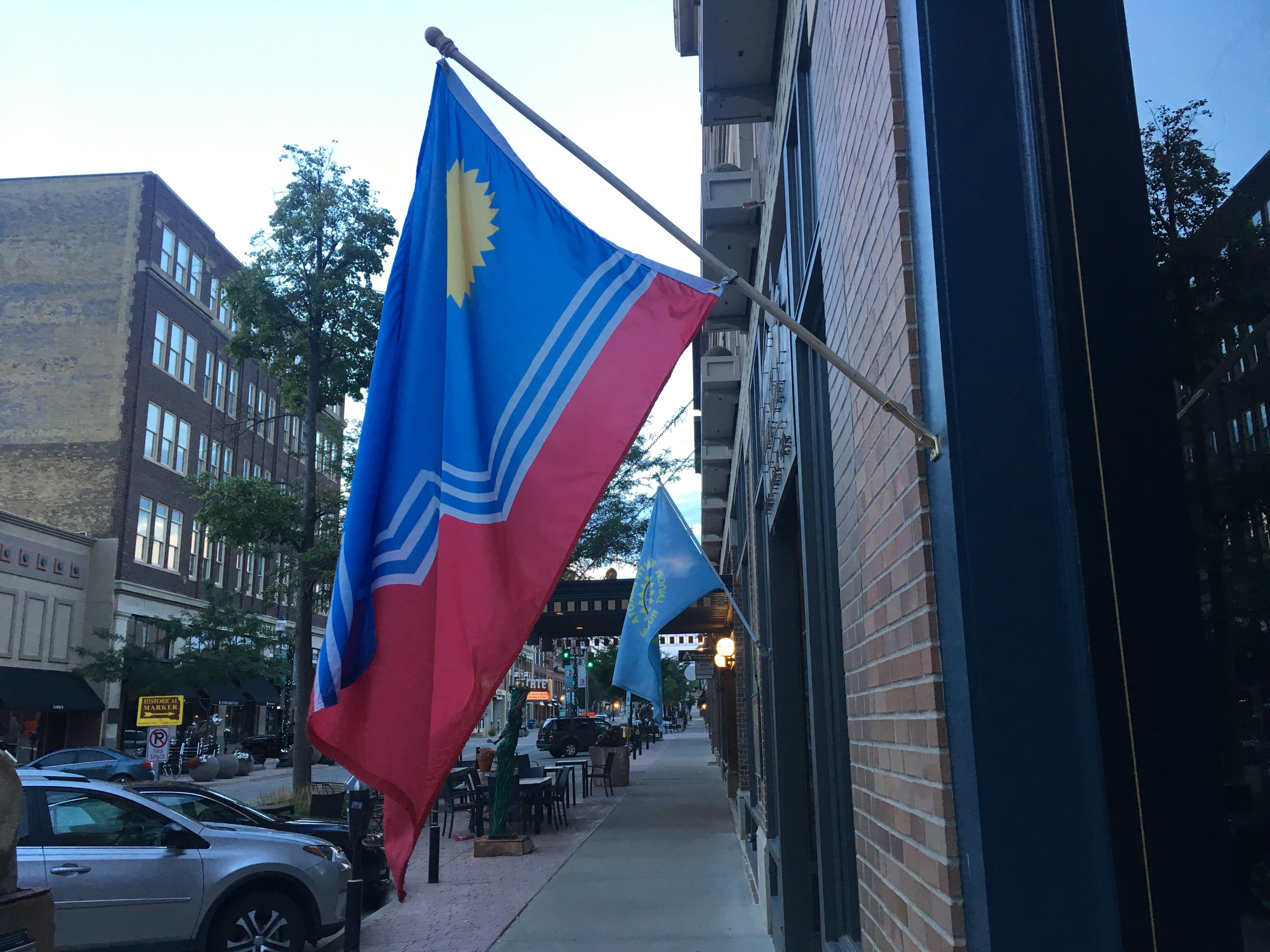
A flag of Sioux Falls in Downtown Sioux Falls, with a flag of South Dakota in the background

In 2004, the North American Vexillological Association (NAVA) rated the design of flags from the 100 largest cities in the U.S., all 50 state capitals and at least two cities per state. Sioux Falls was not included in the rating because it did not have a flag, but the mayor, Dave Munson, did not know why it did not.

In 2014, a design conference hosted by OTA, an organization that connects creative communities in the "-ota" states (South Dakota, North Dakota and Minnesota), was held at the Washington Pavilion in Sioux Falls. The invited speaker Roman Mars noted that Sioux Falls was one of only three major U.S. cities (along with Fargo, North Dakota, and Hilo, Hawaii) not to have an official flag. OTA combined with the Sioux Falls Design Center and the American Institute of Graphic Arts to form The Committee to Establish a Suitable Flying Banner for the City of Sioux Falls (CESFBCSF) to design a flag for the city.

The CESFBCSF held a public design contest and 91 entries were submitted. One flag won both the "Best in Show" by a panel of experts and the "People's Choice" award from over 3000 community votes. The designer, Max Rabkin, released the flag to the public domain. Ted Kaye, a vexillological expert and president of NAVA, stated that the design would be considered one of the best city flags in the U.S.

The CESFBCSF tried multiple times to go to the city council and wrote them a letter to adopt the flag, but the city council had little interest. In 2016 the flag was introduced to the city council and former mayor, Mike Huether, but the council was busy with other issues. The CESFBCSF thought that the cost would be a potential issue and offered to pay for flags, but there was still no interest.

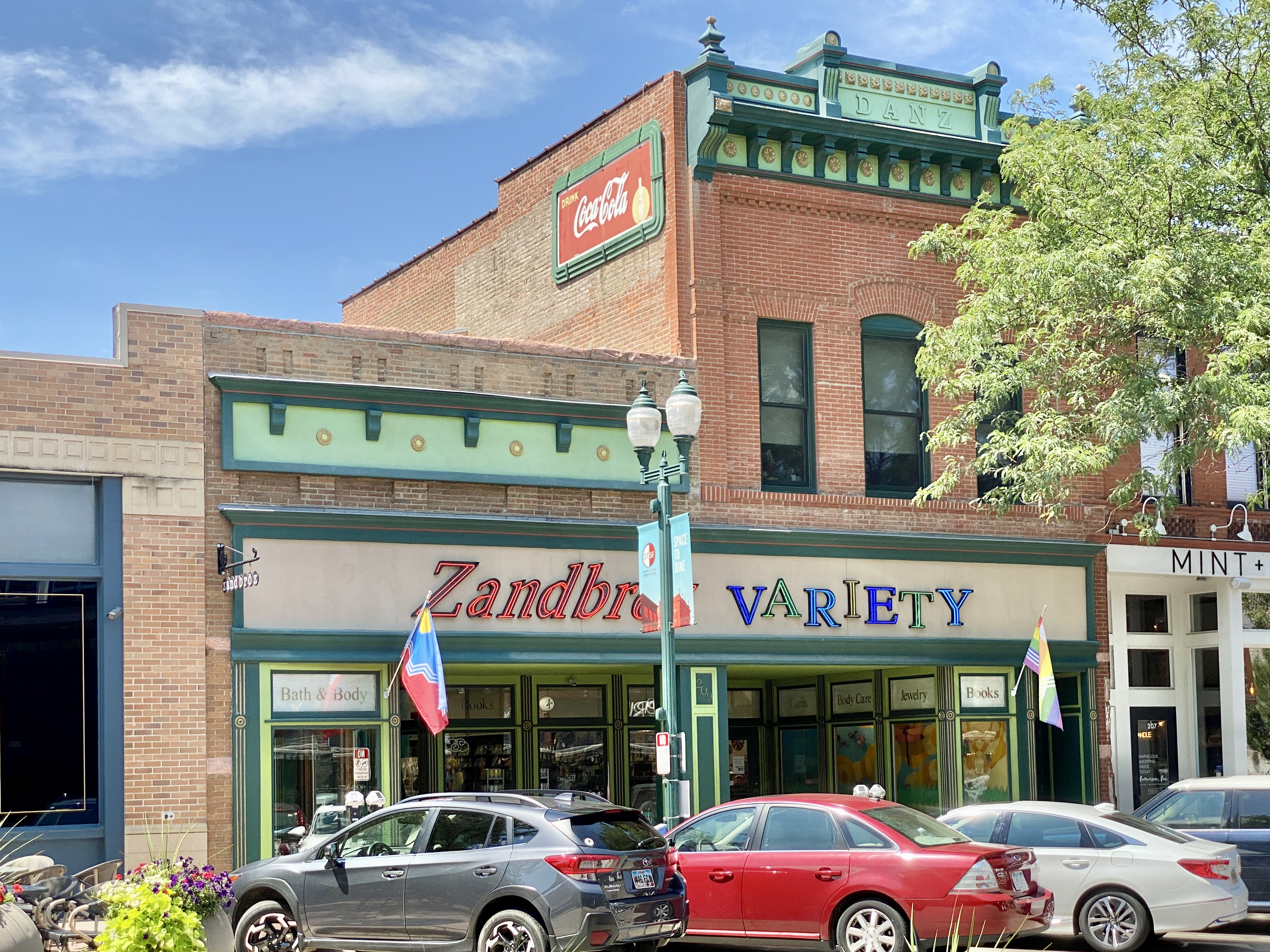
A flag of Sioux Falls in front of Zandbroz Variety in Downtown Sioux Falls

Despite a lack of interest from the city council and mayor, there was a grassroots support-building effort to build community interest, which led local media to call it "The People's Flag". Local media identified the flag as a symbol of the community and it was displayed at homes, businesses and even a local march. Downtown businesses contributed to the grassroots effort through flag-related sales.

There was a renewed push to get the flag approved in 2018 after the election of a new mayor, Paul Ten Haken. The council had concerns the flag would not have copyright protection, but it was argued that a flag in the public domain would be for all people. The city officially adopted the flag when it was approved unanimously by the Sioux Falls City Council on July 10, 2018. By November 2018, the flag was being flown in front of city buildings and inside the mayor's office.

Local businesses and organizations have embraced the flag by creating flag merchandise. The flag has appeared on t-shirts of local businesses, on the jersey of the Sioux Falls Skyforce professional basketball team, and even on a Metallica concert graphic.

In a 2022 NAVA survey, the flag received an A grade and was rated in the top 25 of over 300 flags introduced since 2015.
