= 2006 Sioux Falls mayoral election =

- April 11, 2006; April 25, 2006

Candidate	Dave Munson	Bruce R. Halverson
First round	8,423; 27.99%	6,374; 21.18%
Runoff	13,983; 51.65%	13,092; 48.35%
Candidate	Vernon Brown	Darrin Smith
First round	5,468; 18.17%	3,729; 12.39%
Runoff	Eliminated	Eliminated
Mayor before election
Dave Munson
Nonpartisan
Elected mayor
Dave Munson
Nonpartisan

The 2006 Sioux Falls mayoral election took place on April 25, 2006, following a primary election on April 11, 2006. Incumbent Mayor Dave Munson announced on February 2, 2006, that he would not seek re-election following a campaign finance controversy. Accordingly, a crowded race formed to succeed him. However, Munson changed his mind and announced he would seek a second term on March 16. Munson placed first in the primary, winning 28 percent of the vote. He advanced to the general election with Bruce Halverson, the President of Augustana College. Munson narrowly defeated Halverson, 52–48 percent, a margin of 891 votes, to win his second and final term as mayor.

== Primary election ==
=== Candidates ===
- Dave Munson, incumbent Mayor
- Bruce R. Halverson, President of Augustana College
- Vernon Brown, City Councilmember
- Darrin Smith, City Councilmember
- Casey Murschel, State Representative
- Mitch Richter, former State Representative
- Bob Jamison, City Councilmember, 2002 candidate for Mayor
- Lora L. Hubbel, alternative health care provider
- Dan Christopherson, voting activist, satirical candidate
- Janoct Ajda, businessman
- Darrel E. Viereck, commercial real estate broker

=== Results ===
2006 Sioux Falls mayoral primary election
Party	Candidate	Votes	%
Nonpartisan	Dave Munson (inc.)	8,423	27.99%
Nonpartisan	Bruce R. Halverson	6,374	21.18%
Nonpartisan	Vernon Brown	5,468	18.17%
Nonpartisan	Darrin Smith	3,729	12.39%
Nonpartisan	Casey Murschel	1,701	5.65%
Nonpartisan	Mitch Richter	1,690	5.62%
Nonpartisan	Bob Jamison	1,620	5.38%
Nonpartisan	Lora L. Hubbel	662	2.20%
Nonpartisan	Dan Christopherson	216	0.72%
Nonpartisan	Janoct Ajda	133	0.44%
Nonpartisan	Darrel E. Viereck	79	0.26%
Total votes		30,095	100.00%

== General election ==
=== Results ===
2006 Sioux Falls mayoral runoff election
Party	Candidate	Votes	%
Nonpartisan	Dave Munson (inc.)	13,983	51.65%
Nonpartisan	Bruce R. Halverson	13,092	48.35%
Total votes		27,075	100.00%
