= Jim Stalzer =

American politician

Member of the South Dakota Senate from the 11th district
- Incumbent
- Assumed office January 10, 2017
- Preceded by: David Omdahl

Member of the South Dakota House of Representatives from the 11th district
- In office January 11, 2013 – January 9, 2017 Serving with Christine Erickson (2013–2014); Mark Willadsen (2014–2017)
- Preceded by: Mark Willadsen
- Succeeded by: Chris Karr

Personal details
- Born: July 7, 1946 (age 80)
- Party: Republican
- Spouse: Carol Stalzer
- Children: 2

James Bruce Stalzer (born July 7, 1946) is an American politician. A member of the Republican Party, he has been a member of the South Dakota Senate, representing District 11 since 2017. He was previously a member of the South Dakota House of Representatives, representing District 11 from 2013 to 2017.

== Elections ==
=== South Dakota House of Representatives ===
In 2012, when incumbent Republican Representative Lora Hubbel ran for South Dakota Senate and left a District 11 seat open, Stalzer ran in the four-way June 5, 2012 Republican Primary and placed second with 447 votes ahead of incumbent Representative Mark Willadsen; in the four-way November 6, 2012 General election, fellow Republican nominee Christine Erickson took the first seat and Stalzer took the second seat with 5,124 votes (27.88%) ahead of Democratic former Representative Darrell Solberg and Jim Larson, who had run for the seat in 2010.

=== South Dakota state senate ===
In 2016, Stalzer ran for the South Dakota Senate District 11 seat, after incumbent David Omdahl decided not to run for a second term. Stalzer was unopposed in the Republican primary, as was his Democratic counterpart, Tom Cool. Stalzer defeated Cool with 6,944 votes (60.78%) to 4,481 votes (39.22%). In 2018, Stalzer defeated Kevin Elsing with 6,190 votes (60.4%) to 4,058 votes (39.6%).

== Criticism ==
In 2015, the police of Sioux Falls demanded Stalzer apologize after he made controversial remarks regarding concealed weapons. Stalzer's answer to the demand was that he made a comparison between honesty and integrity of concealed weapons and their holders, and therefore he has nothing to apologize about.
