= Erik Muckey =

American politician

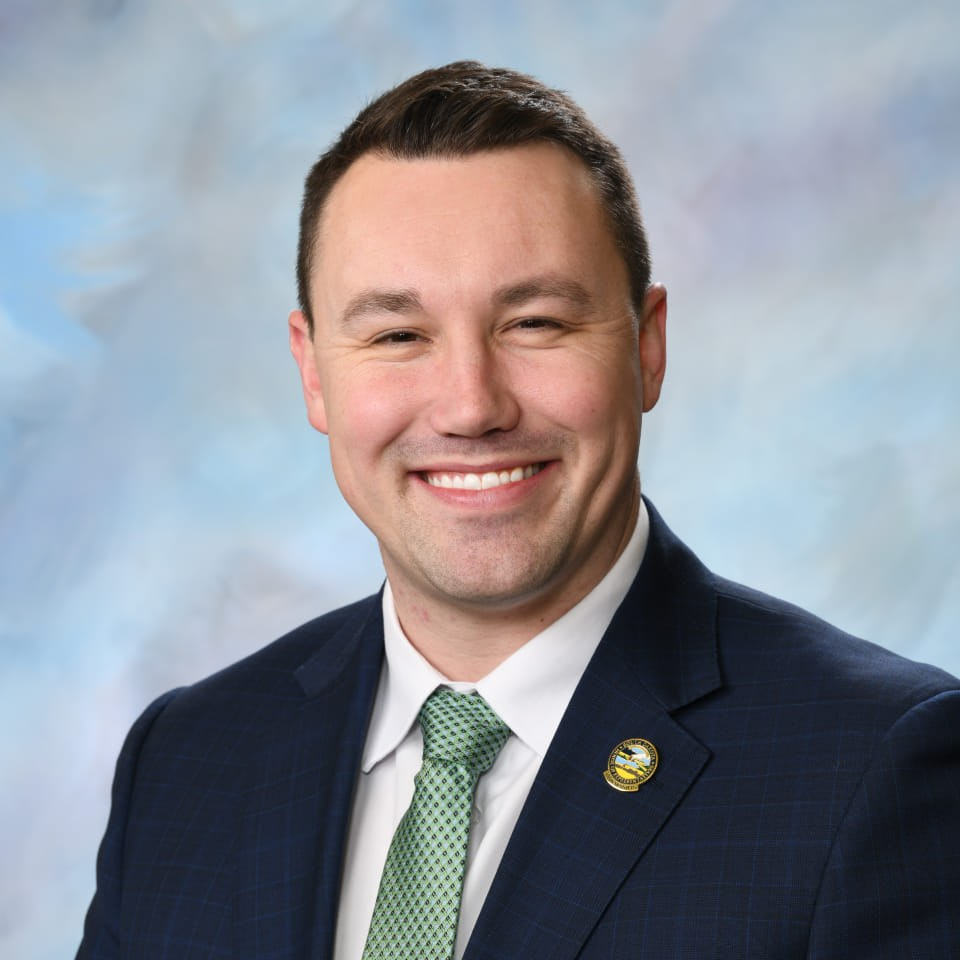

Member of the South Dakota House of Representatives from the 15th district
- Incumbent
- Assumed office January 14, 2025 Serving with Kadyn Wittman
- Preceded by: Linda Duba

Personal details
- Born: Platte, South Dakota
- Party: Democratic
- Education: University of South Dakota (BBA); University of Minnesota (MBA, MPP)
- Profession: Nonprofit executive and consultant
- Committees: Joint Committee on Appropriations, House Retirement Laws, Interim Rules Review Committee
- Website: www.erikmuckey.com

Erik Muckey is an American nonprofit leader and politician serving as a member of the South Dakota House of Representatives serving District 15 since January 2025. His district is located in downtown and north central Sioux Falls, South Dakota.

== Early life and education ==
Muckey was born in Platte, South Dakota to rural educators Scott and Sheryl (née Beukelman) Muckey and raised in Corsica, South Dakota. He is the seventh-generation of Dutch immigrants to live in Douglas County, South Dakota.

Muckey graduated from Corsica High School in 2010 before attending the University of South Dakota, earning a Bachelor of Business Administration in Economics in 2014. While at USD, Muckey got his start in politics serving as Student Government Association President and working for the United States Senate Committee on Banking, Housing, and Urban Affairs under then Chairman Senator Tim Johnson. After a stint of roles in government and financial services, Muckey attended the Carlson School of Management and Humphrey School of Public Affairs at the University of Minnesota, earning a Master of Business Administration degree, Master of Public Policy degree, and Certificate in Nonprofit Management in 2020. Muckey also holds a Project Management Professional certification.

== Career ==
After finishing high school, Muckey joined friend DJ Smith in co-founding what would become Lost&Found, a leading youth and young adult suicide prevention nonprofit serving South Dakota and surrounding states. The founding board attended the University of South Dakota together, building Lost&Found into a network of student suicide prevention groups in South Dakota.

Upon graduating from USD in 2014, Muckey experienced his own battle with depression and burnout and moved to Sioux Falls to regain his mental health while taking over the reins of Lost&Found as President. Muckey worked between 2014 and 2017 in the financial services sector, serving in consulting and project management roles at Citi and MetaBank.

Muckey decided to pursue graduate studies at the University of Minnesota in 2017, where he was able to refine the model of Lost&Found during his graduate school career with the intent to return to South Dakota. Under Muckey's leadership, Lost&Found became a strengths-based suicide prevention organization, focused on resilience, that secured $300,000 in funding in 2020 and grew to become a leading source of suicide prevention resources regionally.

While at the University of Minnesota, Muckey continued a brief stint in financial services at Sunrise Banks in Saint Paul, MN and founded PASQ, a rural economic development and nonprofit management consulting firm. Upon graduation from the University of Minnesota, Muckey served briefly as an Adjunct Instructor of Economics for the Beacom School of Business at the University of South Dakota.

Returning to South Dakota in the summer of 2021, Muckey opened Lost&Found's first office in Sioux Falls and built a team of more than a dozen staff as its CEO. In 2023, Muckey used his lobbying experience to form a coalition that successfully lobbied the South Dakota Legislature for $2 million in funding for mental health and suicide prevention programs and was recognized by the Sioux Falls Young Professional Network with the 4 Under 40 Award. Muckey announced in December 2024 his intent to step down as CEO at Lost&Found, and Carrie Jorgensen was named his successor in May 2025.

In December 2023, Muckey announced his candidacy to serve the 15th legislative district of the South Dakota House of Representatives. Muckey's campaign platform focused on investing in public education, improving community healthcare, and creating economic opportunity for all.

During the 2024 South Dakota House of Representatives election, Muckey narrowly won one of two seats for District 15, succeeding Linda Duba. Muckey secured 4,365 votes, defeating Joni Tschetter in a two-day recount after Tschetter earned 4,356 votes. Muckey serves with incumbent Democrat Kadyn Wittman, who earned 4,552 votes in the 2024 election, in the South Dakota House of Representatives.

== Personal life ==
Muckey lives in downtown Sioux Falls with his wife, Sadie Swier. He enjoys hiking, cycling, and snowmobiling and is an active member of Sioux Falls Downtown Rotary and the Sioux Falls Young Professionals Network.
