= Rebekah Cradduck =

American politician

Member of the South Dakota House of Representatives from the 11th district
- In office January 14, 2003 – January 11, 2005
- Preceded by: Mike Jaspers; Mitch Richter
- Succeeded by: Mark Willadsen

Member of the South Dakota Senate from the 11th district
- In office December 4, 2001 – January 14, 2003
- Preceded by: Dick Hainje
- Succeeded by: Mike Jaspers

Personal details
- Born: August 31, 1953 (age 72) Fort Pierre, South Dakota
- Party: Republican

Rebekah Cradduck (born August 31, 1953) is an American politician who served in the South Dakota Senate from the 11th district from 2001 to 2003 and in the South Dakota House of Representatives from the 11th district from 2003 to 2005.
