= Christine Erickson =

American politician

- Erickson in 2026

Mayor of Sioux Falls
- Incumbent
- Assumed office July 17, 2026
- Preceded by: Paul TenHaken

Member of the South Dakota House of Representatives from the 11th district
- In office January 11, 2013 – May 20, 2014 Serving with Jim Stalzer
- Preceded by: Lora Hubbel
- Succeeded by: Mark Willadsen

Personal details
- Born: Christine Marie Vinatieri; January 29, 1978 (age 48) Rapid City, South Dakota, U.S.
- Party: Republican
- Spouse: Tony Erickson (m. 2005; div. 2023)
- Children: 3
- Relatives: Adam Vinatieri (brother)
- Education: National American University (AA); University of Sioux Falls (BA)

Christine Marie Erickson (née Vinatieri; born January 29, 1978) is an American politician who is the mayor of Sioux Falls, South Dakota following her victory in the 2026 election. A member of the Republican Party, she has been an at-large member of the Sioux Falls City Council since 2014. She was previously a member of the South Dakota House of Representatives, representing District 11 from 2013 to 2014.

== Education ==
Erickson earned her associate degree in business administration from National American University and her bachelor's degree in business management from the University of Sioux Falls.

== Elections ==
In 2012, when incumbent Republican Representative Lora Hubbel ran for South Dakota Senate and left a District 11 seat open, Erickson ran in the four-way June 5, 2012 Republican Primary and placed first with 539 votes (31.2%) ahead of incumbent Representative Mark Willadsen; in the four-way November 6, 2012 General election, Erickson took the first seat with 5,685 votes (30.93%) and fellow Republican nominee Jim Stalzer took the second seat ahead of Democratic former Representative Darrell Solberg and Jim Larson, who had run for the seat in 2010.

In 2014, Erickson ran for the at-large B seat of the Sioux Falls City Council, when Jim Entenman chose not to seek re-election. She defeated her Democratic challenger Denny Pierson by 17,489 votes (65%) to 9,470 (35%). She resigned her District 11 seat after the election, and her vacancy was filled by Willadsen, who was appointed by Governor of South Dakota, Dennis Daugaard, to finish her term. In 2018, she defeated Nick Weiland 67% to 33%.

In 2026, Erickson ran for Mayor of Sioux Falls. She placed first in the June 2 primary election, winning 37% of the vote. Since none of the five candidates got 50% of the vote, she and state senator Jamie Smith advanced to a runoff election on June 23, where she defeated Smith by just two votes. After a recount, Erickson's lead increased to four votes, and Smith conceded the race. Erickson was sworn in as mayor on July 17, 2026; she is the first woman to hold that position.

== Personal life ==
Erickson's brother is former National Football League placekicker Adam Vinatieri, who currently holds the record for most points scored in the NFL.

== See also ==
- List of mayors of Sioux Falls, South Dakota

Political offices
Preceded by Paul TenHaken	Mayor of Sioux Falls; 2026–present	Incumbent
