= Darrell Solberg =

American politician

Member of the South Dakota House of Representatives from the 11th district
- In office January 13, 2009 – January 11, 2011
- Preceded by: Mark Willadsen; Keri Weems
- Succeeded by: Mark Willadsen; Lora Hubbel

Personal details
- Born: February 14, 1942 (age 84) Lily, South Dakota
- Party: Democratic

Darrell Solberg (born February 14, 1942) is an American politician who served in the South Dakota House of Representatives from the 11th district from 2009 to 2011.
