= Crystal Johnson =

Crystal Johnson may refer to:

- Crystal Johnson (attorney) (born 1977), States Attorney for Minnehaha County, South Dakota
- Crystal Johnson (singer), singer and songwriter from Brooklyn, New York
