= 2018 South Dakota Public Utilities Commission election =

- November 6, 2018
Candidate	Kristie Fiegen	Wayne Frederick
Party	Republican	Democratic
Popular vote	206,436	108,925
Percentage	65.46%	34.54%
- County results Fiegen: 50–60% 60–70% 70–80% 80–90% Frederick: 50–60% 60–70% 80–90% 90–100%
Public Utilities Commissioner before election
Kristie Fiegen
Republican
Elected Public Utilities Commissioner
Kristie Fiegen
Republican

The 2018 South Dakota Public Utilities Commission election was held on November 6, 2018, to elect one of three members of the South Dakota Public Utilities Commission. Incumbent Republican Kristie Fiegen was re-elected to a second full term in office, defeating Democratic challenger Wayne Frederick in a landslide.

== Republican primary ==
=== Candidates ===
==== Nominee ====
- Kristie Fiegen, incumbent public utilities commissioner (2011–present)

== Democratic primary ==
=== Candidates ===
==== Nominee ====
- Wayne Frederick

== General election ==
=== Results ===
2018 South Dakota Public Utilities Commission election
Party	Candidate	Votes	%
Republican	Kristie Fiegen (incumbent)	206,436	65.46%
Democratic	Wayne Frederick	108,925	34.54%
Total votes		315,361	100.00%
Republican hold			

==== By county ====
County	Kristie Fiegen Republican		Wayne Frederick Democratic		Margin		Total
County	#	%	#	%	#	%	Total
Aurora	807	68.56%	370	31.44%	437	37.13%	1,177
Beadle	3,858	67.59%	1,850	32.41%	2,008	35.18%	5,708
Bennett	551	53.55%	478	46.45%	73	7.09%	1,029
Bon Homme	1,683	67.81%	799	32.19%	884	35.62%	2,482
Brookings	6,852	62.45%	4,120	37.55%	2,732	24.90%	10,972
Brown	8,302	61.81%	5,129	38.19%	3,173	23.62%	13,431
Brule	1,387	70.77%	573	29.23%	814	41.53%	1,960
Buffalo	167	32.43%	348	67.57%	-181	-35.15%	515
Butte	2,764	77.40%	807	22.60%	1,957	54.80%	3,571
Campbell	603	87.01%	90	12.99%	513	74.03%	693
Charles Mix	2,095	63.47%	1,206	36.53%	889	26.93%	3,301
Clark	1,029	67.48%	496	32.52%	533	34.95%	1,525
Clay	2,037	47.55%	2,247	52.45%	-210	-4.90%	4,284
Codington	6,685	68.66%	3,051	31.34%	3,634	37.33%	9,736
Corson	464	43.57%	601	56.43%	-137	-12.86%	1,065
Custer	2,994	72.13%	1,157	27.87%	1,837	44.25%	4,151
Davison	4,720	70.18%	2,006	29.82%	2,714	40.35%	6,726
Day	1,385	56.42%	1,070	43.58%	315	12.83%	2,455
Deuel	1,252	67.79%	595	32.21%	657	35.57%	1,847
Dewey	580	33.64%	1,144	66.36%	-564	-32.71%	1,724
Douglas	1,210	86.49%	189	13.51%	1,021	72.98%	1,399
Edmunds	1,135	73.18%	416	26.82%	719	46.36%	1,551
Fall River	2,143	71.10%	871	28.90%	1,272	42.20%	3,014
Faulk	775	78.84%	208	21.16%	567	57.68%	983
Grant	2,037	68.91%	919	31.09%	1,118	37.82%	2,956
Gregory	1,382	71.42%	553	28.58%	829	42.84%	1,935
Haakon	788	88.24%	105	11.76%	683	76.48%	893
Hamlin	1,918	76.20%	599	23.80%	1,319	52.40%	2,517
Hand	1,163	75.37%	380	24.63%	783	50.75%	1,543
Hanson	1,078	73.18%	395	26.82%	683	46.37%	1,473
Harding	584	89.02%	72	10.98%	512	78.05%	656
Hughes	5,433	72.22%	2,090	27.78%	3,343	44.44%	7,523
Hutchinson	2,434	79.70%	620	20.30%	1,814	59.40%	3,054
Hyde	477	76.20%	149	23.80%	328	52.40%	626
Jackson	574	61.72%	356	38.28%	218	23.44%	930
Jerauld	570	67.30%	277	32.70%	293	34.59%	847
Jones	424	83.30%	85	16.70%	339	66.60%	509
Kingsbury	1,540	67.81%	731	32.19%	809	35.62%	2,271
Lake	3,467	70.94%	1,420	29.06%	2,047	41.89%	4,887
Lawrence	6,827	66.54%	3,433	33.46%	3,394	33.08%	10,260
Lincoln	15,846	70.21%	6,724	29.79%	9,122	40.42%	22,570
Lyman	865	66.85%	429	33.15%	436	33.69%	1,294
Marshall	938	52.55%	847	47.45%	91	5.10%	1,785
McCook	1,670	72.74%	626	27.26%	1,044	45.47%	2,296
McPherson	816	82.18%	177	17.82%	639	64.35%	993
Meade	7,120	74.31%	2,461	25.69%	4,659	48.63%	9,581
Mellette	343	50.52%	336	49.48%	7	1.03%	679
Miner	691	69.31%	306	30.69%	385	38.62%	997
Minnehaha	40,484	61.83%	24,988	38.17%	15,496	23.67%	65,472
Moody	1,671	62.58%	999	37.42%	672	25.17%	2,670
Oglala Lakota	266	9.06%	2,669	90.94%	-2,403	-81.87%	2,935
Pennington	25,374	65.15%	13,575	34.85%	11,799	30.29%	38,949
Perkins	1,003	81.15%	233	18.85%	770	62.30%	1,236
Potter	909	82.56%	192	17.44%	717	65.12%	1,101
Roberts	1,727	50.67%	1,681	49.33%	46	1.35%	3,408
Sanborn	716	75.93%	227	24.07%	489	51.86%	943
Spink	1,705	64.71%	930	35.29%	775	29.41%	2,635
Stanley	1,027	73.51%	370	26.49%	657	47.03%	1,397
Sully	639	85.54%	108	14.46%	531	71.08%	747
Todd	433	19.83%	1,751	80.17%	-1,318	-60.35%	2,184
Tripp	1,760	75.15%	582	24.85%	1,178	50.30%	2,342
Turner	2,792	76.75%	846	23.25%	1,946	53.49%	3,638
Union	4,408	69.53%	1,932	30.47%	2,476	39.05%	6,340
Walworth	1,646	77.57%	476	22.43%	1,170	55.14%	2,122
Yankton	5,082	62.76%	3,015	37.24%	2,067	25.53%	8,097
Ziebach	331	42.93%	440	57.07%	-109	-14.14%	771
Totals	206,436	65.46%	108,925	34.54%	97,511	30.92%	315,361
