= Lora Hubbel =

American politician

Member of the South Dakota House of Representatives from the 11th district
- In office January 11, 2011 – January 8, 2013 Serving with Mark Willadsen
- Preceded by: Todd Schlekeway; Darrell Solberg
- Succeeded by: Christine Erickson; Jim Stalzer

Personal details
- Party: Independent (2014-2015; 2021-present); Republican (before 2014; 2016–2018); Constitution (2018)
- Education: University of South Dakota

Lora Lyn Hubbel is an American politician; a former member of the South Dakota House of Representatives and a former chair of the Minnehaha County Republican Party and the former state chair of the Constitution Party of South Dakota.

== Elections ==
- Hubbel first ran for office in 2006, coming 8th out of 11 candidates in the nonpartisan election for Mayor of Sioux Falls with 662 votes (2.2%).
- In 2010 she was elected to the South Dakota House of Representatives as a Republican, representing District 11.
- In 2012, after state redistricting, Hubbel challenged State Senator Deb Peters in the June 5, 2012, Republican primary and lost by 42 votes out of 405 votes cast (52.73%). Peters was unopposed for the November 6, 2012, general election, winning with 5,939 votes.
- In 2014, Hubbel ran for the Republican nomination for Governor of South Dakota in the 2014 election, challenging incumbent Republican Dennis Daugaard. She lost to Daugaard in the primary, polling 14,196 votes (19.13%) to his 60,017 (80.87%). She was subsequently announced as the new running mate of Independent candidate Mike Myers, replacing his initial running mate, who dropped out due to a family illness. Secretary of State of South Dakota Jason Gant refused to remove Collier's name, citing that state law had no provision for replacing an independent candidate on the ballot. In July, Myers sued the secretary of state to allow him to change his running mate and on August 18, federal judge Lawrence L. Piersol of the United States District Court for the District of South Dakota ruled in Myers' favour.
- In 2016 Hubbel again challenged State Senator Deb Peters in the Republican primary, who defeated Hubbel on a vote of 569 to 441 (56.3% to 43.4%).
- In July 2017, Hubbel announced she would be a candidate for the 2018 Republican nomination for South Dakota Governor.
- In March 2018, Hubbel fell short of signature requirements needed to make the primary ballot for the Gubernatorial race, and filed to run for state senate against incumbent Wayne Steinhauer. Steinhauer won the June primary 61.5% to 38.5%.

== Controversy ==
On October 11, 2017, Republican gubernatorial candidate Lora Hubbel sent out a press release noting that South Dakota Republican Party Chairman Dan Lederman had been registered as a Democrat during the 2000 election cycle. In reporting the story, the media noted that Hubbel had changed parties, having been chair of the South Dakota Constitution Party up until February 2017.

After losing the 2018 Republican primary for state senate, Hubbel attempted to be named as a candidate for Governor on the Constitution Party ticket as did former Republican Party candidate Terry LaFleur. The Constitution Party convention ended up nominating no candidates for statewide office.. Terry LaFleur accused Lora Hubbel and her supporters of trying to stage a coup. Both factions reconvened separately, each nominating candidates for office. In response, the South Dakota Republican Party sought and was granted a Writ of Prohibition against placing either Constitution Party candidates on the ballot.

On August 11, 2026, Lora Hubbel posted on a public Facebook group racist rhetoric in regards to rights when describing why she believed she should have access to her grandchildren.
