= 2024 South Dakota Public Utilities Commission election =

- November 5, 2024
| Candidate | Kristie Fiegen | Forrest Wilson | Gideon Oakes |
| Party | Republican | Democratic | Libertarian |
| Popular vote | 272,099 | 108,029 | 21,176 |
| Percentage | 67.80% | 26.92% | 5.28% |
- County results Fiegen: 40–50% 50–60% 60–70% 70–80% 80–90% >90% Wilson: 50–60% 70–80% 80–90%
Public Utilities Commissioner before election
Kristie Fiegen
Republican
Elected Public Utilities Commissioner
Kristie Fiegen
Republican

The 2024 South Dakota Public Utilities Commission election was held on November 5, 2024, to elect one of three members of the South Dakota Public Utilities Commission. Incumbent Republican Kristie Fiegen was re-elected to a third full term in office, defeating Democratic challenger Forrest Wilson in a landslide. Fiegen was sworn in on January 13, 2025.

== Republican primary ==
=== Candidates ===
==== Nominee ====
- Kristie Fiegen, incumbent public utilities commissioner (2011–present)

== Democratic primary ==
=== Candidates ===
==== Nominee ====
- Forrest Wilson, director of the Lead-Deadwood Boys & Girls Club

== Libertarian primary ==
=== Candidates ===
==== Nominee ====
- Gideon Oakes, businessman and volunteer emergency medical technician

== General election ==
=== Results ===
2024 South Dakota Public Utilities Commission election
| Party | Candidate | Votes | % | ±% |
|---|---|---|---|---|
| Republican | Kristie Fiegen (incumbent) | 272,099 | 67.80% | +2.34% |
| Democratic | Forrest Wilson | 108,029 | 26.92% | −7.62% |
| Libertarian | Gideon Oakes | 21,176 | 5.28% | N/A |
| Total votes | | 401,304 | 100.00% | N/A |
| Republican hold | | | | |

==== By county ====
| County | Kristie Fiegen Republican | | Forrest Wilson Democratic | | Gideon Oakes Libertarian | | Margin | | Total |
| County | # | % | # | % | # | % | # | % | Total |
|---|---|---|---|---|---|---|---|---|---|
| Aurora | 1,034 | 78.87% | 239 | 18.23% | 38 | 2.90% | 795 | 60.64% | 1,311 |
| Beadle | 4,955 | 74.49% | 1,448 | 21.77% | 249 | 3.74% | 3,507 | 52.72% | 6,652 |
| Bennett | 588 | 59.82% | 347 | 35.30% | 48 | 4.88% | 241 | 24.52% | 983 |
| Bon Homme | 2,147 | 76.38% | 546 | 19.42% | 118 | 4.20% | 1,601 | 56.95% | 2,811 |
| Brookings | 9,191 | 65.76% | 4,126 | 29.52% | 659 | 4.72% | 5,065 | 36.24% | 13,976 |
| Brown | 10,628 | 66.87% | 4,567 | 28.74% | 698 | 4.39% | 6,061 | 38.14% | 15,893 |
| Brule | 1,719 | 75.13% | 481 | 21.02% | 88 | 3.85% | 1,238 | 54.11% | 2,288 |
| Buffalo | 166 | 37.22% | 261 | 58.52% | 19 | 4.26% | -95 | -21.30% | 446 |
| Butte | 3,719 | 77.80% | 735 | 15.38% | 326 | 6.82% | 2,984 | 62.43% | 4,780 |
| Campbell | 666 | 86.27% | 80 | 10.36% | 26 | 3.37% | 586 | 75.91% | 772 |
| Charles Mix | 2,511 | 72.45% | 846 | 24.41% | 109 | 3.14% | 1,665 | 48.04% | 3,466 |
| Clark | 1,324 | 78.02% | 313 | 18.44% | 60 | 3.54% | 1,011 | 59.58% | 1,697 |
| Clay | 2,743 | 52.19% | 2,272 | 43.23% | 241 | 4.59% | 471 | 8.96% | 5,256 |
| Codington | 9,220 | 74.34% | 2,672 | 21.54% | 511 | 4.12% | 6,548 | 52.79% | 12,403 |
| Corson | 595 | 54.69% | 437 | 40.17% | 56 | 5.15% | 158 | 14.52% | 1,088 |
| Custer | 3,971 | 69.52% | 1,163 | 20.36% | 578 | 10.12% | 2,808 | 49.16% | 5,712 |
| Davison | 6,283 | 74.13% | 1,850 | 21.83% | 343 | 4.05% | 4,433 | 52.30% | 8,476 |
| Day | 1,813 | 68.00% | 750 | 28.13% | 103 | 3.86% | 1,063 | 39.87% | 2,666 |
| Deuel | 1,645 | 76.30% | 389 | 18.04% | 122 | 5.66% | 1,256 | 58.26% | 2,156 |
| Dewey | 721 | 41.44% | 929 | 53.39% | 90 | 5.17% | -208 | -11.95% | 1,740 |
| Douglas | 1,417 | 89.46% | 143 | 9.03% | 24 | 1.52% | 1,274 | 80.43% | 1,584 |
| Edmunds | 1,544 | 81.09% | 304 | 15.97% | 56 | 2.94% | 1,240 | 65.13% | 1,904 |
| Fall River | 2,898 | 71.38% | 837 | 20.62% | 325 | 8.00% | 2,061 | 50.76% | 4,060 |
| Faulk | 869 | 82.76% | 149 | 14.19% | 32 | 3.05% | 720 | 68.57% | 1,050 |
| Grant | 2,537 | 75.84% | 667 | 19.94% | 141 | 4.22% | 1,870 | 55.90% | 3,345 |
| Gregory | 1,698 | 80.28% | 347 | 16.41% | 70 | 3.31% | 1,351 | 63.88% | 2,115 |
| Haakon | 963 | 90.08% | 73 | 6.83% | 33 | 3.09% | 890 | 83.26% | 1,069 |
| Hamlin | 2,511 | 82.25% | 431 | 14.12% | 111 | 3.64% | 2,080 | 68.13% | 3,053 |
| Hand | 1,347 | 81.00% | 264 | 15.87% | 52 | 3.13% | 1,083 | 65.12% | 1,663 |
| Hanson | 1,536 | 80.25% | 328 | 17.14% | 50 | 2.61% | 1,208 | 63.11% | 1,914 |
| Harding | 714 | 91.54% | 36 | 4.62% | 30 | 3.85% | 678 | 86.92% | 780 |
| Hughes | 5,803 | 72.10% | 1,837 | 22.83% | 408 | 5.07% | 3,966 | 49.28% | 8,048 |
| Hutchinson | 3,013 | 84.30% | 444 | 12.42% | 117 | 3.27% | 2,569 | 71.88% | 3,574 |
| Hyde | 541 | 81.60% | 99 | 14.93% | 23 | 3.47% | 442 | 66.67% | 663 |
| Jackson | 703 | 65.82% | 322 | 30.15% | 43 | 4.03% | 381 | 35.67% | 1,068 |
| Jerauld | 716 | 76.82% | 201 | 21.57% | 15 | 1.61% | 515 | 55.26% | 932 |
| Jones | 465 | 88.24% | 41 | 7.78% | 21 | 3.98% | 424 | 80.46% | 527 |
| Kingsbury | 2,031 | 76.84% | 510 | 19.30% | 102 | 3.86% | 1,521 | 57.55% | 2,643 |
| Lake | 4,151 | 74.30% | 1,205 | 21.57% | 231 | 4.13% | 2,946 | 52.73% | 5,587 |
| Lawrence | 9,460 | 65.74% | 3,927 | 27.29% | 1,003 | 6.97% | 5,533 | 38.45% | 14,390 |
| Lincoln | 23,931 | 69.91% | 8,796 | 25.70% | 1,505 | 4.40% | 15,135 | 44.21% | 34,232 |
| Lyman | 968 | 70.20% | 342 | 24.80% | 69 | 5.00% | 626 | 45.40% | 1,379 |
| Marshall | 1,259 | 64.83% | 612 | 31.51% | 71 | 3.66% | 647 | 33.32% | 1,942 |
| McCook | 2,258 | 78.62% | 506 | 17.62% | 108 | 3.76% | 1,752 | 61.00% | 2,872 |
| McPherson | 1,053 | 85.40% | 131 | 10.62% | 49 | 3.97% | 922 | 74.78% | 1,233 |
| Meade | 9,928 | 73.20% | 2,554 | 18.83% | 1,080 | 7.96% | 7,374 | 54.37% | 13,562 |
| Mellette | 402 | 58.26% | 244 | 35.36% | 44 | 6.38% | 158 | 22.90% | 690 |
| Miner | 844 | 78.95% | 192 | 17.96% | 33 | 3.09% | 652 | 60.99% | 1,069 |
| Minnehaha | 54,700 | 62.42% | 28,587 | 32.62% | 4,346 | 4.96% | 26,113 | 29.80% | 87,633 |
| Moody | 2,142 | 69.59% | 821 | 26.67% | 115 | 3.74% | 1,321 | 42.92% | 3,078 |
| Oglala Lakota | 357 | 12.34% | 2,379 | 82.26% | 156 | 5.39% | -2,022 | -69.92% | 2,892 |
| Pennington | 33,056 | 62.65% | 15,384 | 29.16% | 4,324 | 8.19% | 17,672 | 33.49% | 52,764 |
| Perkins | 1,234 | 82.87% | 184 | 12.36% | 71 | 4.77% | 1,050 | 70.52% | 1,489 |
| Potter | 1,038 | 84.53% | 153 | 12.46% | 37 | 3.01% | 885 | 72.07% | 1,228 |
| Roberts | 2,348 | 61.31% | 1,327 | 34.65% | 155 | 4.05% | 1,021 | 26.66% | 3,830 |
| Sanborn | 928 | 80.77% | 182 | 15.84% | 39 | 3.39% | 746 | 64.93% | 1,149 |
| Spink | 2,208 | 73.95% | 665 | 22.27% | 113 | 3.78% | 1,543 | 51.67% | 2,986 |
| Stanley | 1,258 | 76.71% | 298 | 18.17% | 84 | 5.12% | 960 | 58.54% | 1,640 |
| Sully | 699 | 82.43% | 110 | 12.97% | 39 | 4.60% | 589 | 69.46% | 848 |
| Todd | 475 | 23.22% | 1,458 | 71.26% | 113 | 5.52% | -983 | -48.04% | 2,046 |
| Tripp | 2,119 | 83.00% | 357 | 13.98% | 77 | 3.02% | 1,762 | 69.02% | 2,553 |
| Turner | 3,473 | 79.58% | 691 | 15.83% | 200 | 4.58% | 2,782 | 63.75% | 4,364 |
| Union | 6,021 | 72.38% | 1,918 | 23.06% | 380 | 4.57% | 4,103 | 49.32% | 8,319 |
| Walworth | 1,888 | 80.79% | 366 | 15.66% | 83 | 3.55% | 1,522 | 65.13% | 2,337 |
| Yankton | 6,593 | 66.67% | 2,828 | 28.60% | 468 | 4.73% | 3,765 | 38.07% | 9,889 |
| Ziebach | 363 | 49.12% | 328 | 44.38% | 48 | 6.50% | 35 | 4.74% | 739 |
| Totals | 272,099 | 67.80% | 108,029 | 26.92% | 21,176 | 5.28% | 164,070 | 40.88% | 401,304 |

Counties that flipped from Democratic to Republican

- Clay (largest city: Vermillion)
- Corson (largest city: McLaughlin)
- Ziebach (largest city: Dupree)
