= Erin Healy =

American politician from South Dakota

Minority Leader of the South Dakota House of Representatives
- Incumbent
- Assumed office January 14, 2025
- Preceded by: Oren Lesmeister

Member of the South Dakota House of Representatives from the 10th district
- Incumbent
- Assumed office January 8, 2019 Serving with Kameron Nelson
- Preceded by: Tom Holmes

Personal details
- Born: April 22, 1987 (age 39)
- Party: Democratic
- Education: University of Nebraska–Lincoln (BA); University of South Dakota (MA)

Erin Healy (born April 22, 1987) is an American politician. She has served as a South Dakota Democratic Party member in the South Dakota House of Representatives since 2019, from district 10 in Minnehaha County. Healy serves as one of five Democratic members of the South Dakota Legislature.

== Career ==
=== 2018 election season ===
In 2018, Healy ran for one of two South Dakota House of Representatives seats in District 14. She ran against incumbents, Larry Zikmund and Tom Holmes On November 6, 2018, Healy won the election along with Larry Zikmund.

=== 2019–2020 legislative session ===
On January 5, 2019, Healy was sworn in at the South Dakota Capitol Building. She was chosen as the House Minority Whip along with Oren Lesmeister. For the 2019 legislative session, she served as a member of the House Education and House Health and Human Services Committees. In that session, Healy prime sponsored four bills and co-sponsored forty-one. For the 2020 legislative session, she again served as a member of the House Education and House Health and Human Services Committees. In that session, Healy prime sponsored seven bills and co-sponsored thirty-three.

=== 2020 election season ===
In 2020, Healy ran for re-election against fellow Democrat, Mike Huber, and Republicans Taylor Rehfeldt and Tom Holmes in District 14. One day after the general election on November 4, 2020, Healy officially won re-election along with new member Taylor Rehfeldt.

=== 2021 and 2022 legislative session ===
Healy's second term as a member of the South Dakota House of Representatives began on January 12, 2021. For the 2021 legislative session, she served as a member of the House Education and House Health and Human Services Committees. Healy also served as a member of the House Legislative Procedure and Joint Legislative Procedure Committees. In this session, she prime-sponsored six bills and co-sponsored seventeen bills. For the 2022 legislative session, Healy again served as a member of the House Education, House Health and Human Services, House Legislative Procedure, and Joint Legislative Procedure Committees. In this session, she prime-sponsored four bills and co-sponsored seventeen bills.

=== 2022 election season ===
In 2022, Healy ran for the South Dakota House of Representatives in District 10. In the election, she ran against fellow Democrat Kameron Nelson, and Republicans John Mogen and Tom Sutton. On November 8, 2022, Healy won re-election to the South Dakota House of Representatives along with new member Kameron Nelson.

=== 2023 legislative session ===
Healy's third term as a member of the South Dakota House of Representatives began on January 10, 2023. She was chosen as the House Assistant Minority Leader. For the 2023 legislative session, Healy served as a member of the House Health and Human Services and House State Affairs Committees. She also served as a member of the House Legislative Procedure and Joint Legislative Procedure Committees. As of February 5, 2023, Healy has prime-sponsored five bills and co-sponsored thirty-two bills.

South Dakota House of Representatives
Preceded by Oren Lesmeister	Minority Leader of the South Dakota House of Representatives; 2025–present	Incumbent
