= Senator Cutler =

Senator Cutler may refer to:

- Augustus W. Cutler (1827–1897), New Jersey State Senate
- Ephraim Cutler (1767–1853), Ohio State Senate
- Joni Cutler (born 1956), South Dakota State Senate
- Leslie Bradley Cutler (1890–1971), Massachusetts State Senate
- Lysander Cutler (1807–1866), Maine State Senate
- Nathan Cutler (1775–1861), Maine State Senate
