= Omdahl =

Omdahl is a Norwegian surname, given to people from several farms in Agder and Rogaland.

== Notable people ==
Notable people with this surname include:

- David Omdahl (born 1956), American politician
- Harmon T. Ogdahl (1917–2009), American politician and businessman
- Jan Omdahl (born 1961), Norwegian journalist
- Lloyd Omdahl (1931–2024), American politician
- Vicki Jo Omdahl, later known as Brynn Hartman (1958–1998), wife and murderer of Phil Hartman
