= Senator Staggers =

Senator Staggers may refer to:

- Harley O. Staggers Jr. (born 1951), West Virginia State Senate
- Kermit Staggers (1947–2019), South Dakota State Senate
