= South Dakota's 15th legislative district =

American legislative district

South Dakota's 15th State Senate district

South Dakota's 15th legislative district is one of 35 districts in the South Dakota Legislature. Each district is represented by 1 senator and 2 representatives. In the Senate, it has been represented by Democrat Jamie Smith since 2025. In the House, it has been represented by Democrats Linda Duba since 2019 and Kadyn Wittman since 2023.

== Geography ==
The district is located in Sioux Falls entirely within Minnehaha County, the state's most populous county, in southeastern South Dakota.
