= Kadyn Wittman =

American politician serving District 15 in the South Dakota State Legislature

Member of the South Dakota House of Representatives from the 15th district
- Incumbent
- Assumed office January 10, 2023 Serving with Eric Muckey
- Preceded by: Jamie Smith

Personal details
- Born: May 7, 1991 (age 35)
- Party: Democratic
- Education: Augustana University
- Occupation: Development Director
- Website: kadynforhouse.com

Kadyn Wittman (born May 7, 1991) is an American politician serving as a Democratic member of the South Dakota House of Representatives from District 15 since 2023. Wittman is one of nine Democratic members currently serving in the South Dakota Legislature.

== Background ==
Before entering elected office, Wittman worked at the Bishop Dudley Hospitality House and currently serves as the Director of Development for the Sioux Falls Family YMCA.

== Education ==
Wittman graduated from Augustana University in 2013 with a dual Bachelor of Arts degree in sociology and women's studies. She was a member of the Civitas Honors Program, an interdisciplinary initiative emphasizing the study and practice of citizenship in local, national, and global contexts.

During her studies, Wittman participated in multiple study abroad programs, spending time in Greece, London, India, and Ireland. Her senior thesis focused on the political and social dimensions of The Troubles (Irish: Na Trioblóidí), the ethno‑nationalist conflict in Northern Ireland that lasted from the late 1960s to 1998.

== Political career ==
In 2022, Wittman ran for one of two available seats in South Dakota House District 15. She faced incumbent Democrat Linda Duba and Republican candidates Joni Tschetter and Matt Rosburg. Wittman and Duba won the general election on November 8, 2022. In 2024, Wittman was re-elected alongside Democrat Eric Muckey.

In 2023, Wittman was selected to participate in the NCSL's Youth Homelessness Fellows Program, a national initiative supporting policymakers addressing youth and young adult homelessness. The program focuses on solutions at the intersection of child welfare, juvenile justice, and education systems, and provides technical assistance and collaboration opportunities with experts and peers from across the country.

== Legislative priorities ==
Wittman's legislative priorities include advocating for the expansion of free school lunch programs for public school students, increasing support systems and resources for individuals experiencing homelessness, and championing policies that benefit farmers and the agricultural economy in South Dakota.

== Committee assignments ==
Since her first legislative session in 2023, Wittman has served on the House Agriculture and Natural Resources Committee and the House Local Government Committee.

== Leadership and appointments ==
Wittman currently serves as the Minority Whip for the South Dakota House of Representatives. She also chairs the South Dakota Corrections Commission.

In 2025, she was appointed to the Legislature’s interim study committee titled Initial Incarceration, Reentry Analysis, and Comparison of Relevant States. The committee’s work includes:

- Analyzing the demographics, offense characteristics, and geographic distribution of the current prison population;
- Comparing incarceration rates, sentencing laws, and non-violent offender policies with other states;
- Identifying barriers to successful reentry, such as housing, job training, and substance use treatment.

Wittman is one of ten legislators serving on the committee, which is co-chaired by Representative Greg Jamison and Senator Kevin Jensen.

== Electoral history ==
2024 South Dakota's 15th House of Representatives district election
Party	Candidate	Votes	%
Democratic	'Kadyn Wittman' (incumbent)	4,551	26.5%
Democratic	Erik Muckey	4,364	25.4%
Republican	Joni Tschetter	4,357	25.3%
Republican	Brad Lindwurm	3,918	22.8%
Total votes		17,190	100.00%
Democratic hold			
Democratic hold			

2022 South Dakota's 15th House of Representatives district election
Party	Candidate	Votes	%
Democratic	Linda Duba (incumbent)	3,545	28.14%
Democratic	Kadyn Wittman	3,194	25.36%
Republican	Joni Tschetter	3,097	24.59%
Republican	Matt Rosburg	2,761	21.92%
Total votes		12,597	100.00%
Democratic hold			
Democratic hold			
