= Deb Soholt =

American politician

Member of the South Dakota Senate from the 14th district
- Incumbent
- Assumed office January 8, 2013
- Preceded by: Joni Cutler
- Succeeded by: Larry Zikmund (elect)

Personal details
- Born: January 29, 1956 (age 70)
- Party: Republican
- Education: University of North Dakota; South Dakota State University
- Website: soholtforsenate.com

Deborah Ann Soholt (born January 29, 1956) is an American politician and a Republican member of the South Dakota Senate representing District 14 since January 8, 2013.

== Education ==
Soholt earned her BSN from University of North Dakota and her MSN from South Dakota State University.

== Elections ==
- 2012 When incumbent Senate District 14 Republican Senator Joni Cutler left the Legislature and left the seat open, Soholt won the June 5, 2012 Republican Primary with 896 votes (54.2%) and won the November 6, 2012 General election with 6,251 votes (55.5%) against Democratic nominee Brian Kaatz.
