= Mike Jaspers =

American politician

Member of the South Dakota Senate from the 11th district
- In office January 14, 2003 – January 11, 2005
- Preceded by: Rebekah Cradduck
- Succeeded by: Jason Gant

Member of the South Dakota House of Representatives from the 11th district
- In office January 9, 2001 – January 14, 2003
- Preceded by: Kristie Fiegen
- Succeeded by: Keri Weems

Member of the South Dakota House of Representatives from the 1st district
- In office January 14, 1997 – January 9, 2001
- Preceded by: Maurice Olson
- Succeeded by: David Sigdestad

Personal details
- Born: March 22, 1970 (age 56) Webster, South Dakota
- Party: Republican

Mike Jaspers (born March 22, 1970) is an American politician who served in the South Dakota House of Representatives from 1997 to 2003 and in the South Dakota Senate from the 11th district from 2003 to 2005.
