= Crystal Johnson (attorney) =

American politician

States Attorney of Minnehaha County
- In office December 6, 2019 – present
- Preceded by: Aaron McGowan

Magistrate Judge of Second Circuit Court of South Dakota
- In office 2015–2018
- Preceded by: Joni Cutler

Personal details
- Born: Viborg, South Dakota, U.S.
- Party: Republican
- Education: University of Sioux Falls (BA); University of Kansas (JD)
- Occupation: Attorney

Crystal Johnson is an attorney from South Dakota serving as state's attorney for Minnehaha County, the state's most populous county, of which the county seat is Sioux Falls.

== Early life and education ==
Johnson was born in Viborg, South Dakota. She received a B.A. from the University of Sioux Falls in 1999 and a J.D. from the University of Kansas School of Law in 2002.

== Career ==
In 2005, Johnson joined the Minnehaha State's Attorney's Office. In 2014, she was named South Dakota Prosecutor of the Year. In 2015, the South Dakota Supreme Court appointed Johnson to the Second Judicial Circuit to replace Judge Joni Cutler. During her time on the bench, Johnson was a member of the Minnehaha County Veteran's Treatment Court and served on pre-trial detention and release committees. In May 2018, she left the judiciary and returned to the Minnehaha State's Attorney's Office.

In 2019, the presiding judge of the Second Circuit Court, Robin Houwman, appointed Johnson the interim Minnehaha County state's attorney after Aaron McGowan resigned. In January 2020, the Minnehaha County Commission approved Johnson's appointment.

Johnson is also a part-time adjunct professor of political science at the University of South Dakota.
