= Oren Lesmeister =

American politician

Minority Leader of the South Dakota House of Representatives
- In office January 10, 2023 – January 14, 2025
- Preceded by: Jamie Smith
- Succeeded by: Erin Healy

Member of the South Dakota House of Representatives from the 28A district
- In office January 10, 2017 – January 14, 2025
- Preceded by: Dean Schrempp
- Succeeded by: Jana Hunt

Personal details
- Born: July 7, 1966 (age 60) Eagle Butte, South Dakota, U.S.
- Party: Democratic
- Education: Western Dakota Technical Institute

Oren Lesmeister (born July 7, 1966) is an American politician who served in the South Dakota House of Representatives from district 28A from 2017 to 2025. this sub-district contains the Standing Rock and Cheyenne River reservations.

== Electoral history ==
2022

2022 South Dakota's 28A House of Representatives district election
| Party | Candidate | Votes | % |
|---|---|---|---|
| Democratic | Oren Lesmeister (incumbent) | 1,890 | 50.58% |
| Republican | Ralph Lyon | 1,847 | 49.42% |
| Total votes | | 3,737 | 100.00% |
| Democratic hold | | | |

South Dakota House of Representatives
| Preceded by Jamie Smith | Minority Leader of the South Dakota House of Representatives; 2023–2025 | Succeeded by Erin Healy |
