= Jamie Smith (politician) =

American politician (born 1971)

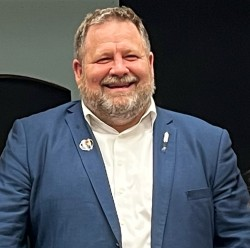
- Smith in 2022

Member of the South Dakota Senate from the 15th district
- Incumbent
- Assumed office January 14, 2025
- Preceded by: Reynold Nesiba

Minority Leader of the South Dakota House of Representatives
- In office January 10, 2019 – January 10, 2023
- Preceded by: Spencer Hawley
- Succeeded by: Oren Lesmeister

Member of the South Dakota House of Representatives from the 15th district
- In office January 10, 2017 – January 10, 2023 Serving with Linda Duba
- Preceded by: Patrick Kirschman
- Succeeded by: Kadyn Wittman

Personal details
- Born: Jamie Robert Smith; January 31, 1971 (age 55) Sioux Falls, South Dakota, U.S.
- Party: Democratic
- Education: Augustana University (BA)

Jamie Robert Smith (born January 31, 1971) is an American politician and educator. He is currently a member of the South Dakota Senate. A member of the Democratic Party, Smith represents District 15, which covers downtown Sioux Falls neighborhoods, including areas around Terrace Park and the Great Plains Zoo. He served as House Minority Leader of the South Dakota House of Representatives from 2019 to 2023.

Smith was the Democratic nominee in the 2022 South Dakota gubernatorial election, losing to incumbent Republican governor Kristi Noem.

== Career ==
Smith is a real estate agent with Hegg Realtors, and a former science teacher and wrestling coach. He currently resides in Sioux Falls.

Smith has earned plaudits from both Republicans and Democrats. In 2025, Greg Jamison, a Republican member of the South Dakota House of Representatives characterized Smith as a "good guy, likable, [and] easy to work with." The previous year, Democratic State Senator Reynold Nesiba stated that he was "thrilled" Smith was running to replace him in the South Dakota Senate.

In 2024, Smith filed to run for the South Dakota State Senate from the 15th District. He faced Republican Brenda Lawrence in the general election and won with 52.4% of the vote.

As a State Senator, Smith supported women's health care and criminal justice reform. During the 2025 legislative session, he encouraged his legislative colleagues to consider drug addiction as "an illness, rather than a moral failing." Smith also opposed school voucher programs. As a candidate, he has pledged to focus on reducing housing costs, expanding access to arts and parks, easing congestion, and funding childcare programs.

On May 28th, 2025, Smith announced that he would run in the 2026 Sioux Falls mayoral race. His ballot petitions were certified on March 19th, 2026. In the first round, none of the five candidates received 50% of the vote, and Smith was narrowly defeated by Christine Erickson with a margin of two votes in the runoff. After a recount, the margin increased to four votes, and Smith decided to concede the race. Erickson was sworn in as mayor on July 17, 2026.

South Dakota House of Representatives
Preceded by Spencer Hawley	Minority Leader of the South Dakota House of Representatives; 2019–2023	Succeeded by Oren Lesmeister
Party political offices
Preceded by Billie Sutton	Democratic nominee for Governor of South Dakota; 2022	Succeeded by Dan Ahlers
