= Dick M. Kelly =

American politician

Member of the South Dakota Senate from the 13th district
- In office 2002–2006
- Preceded by: Kermit Staggers
- Succeeded by: Scott N. Heidepriem

Personal details
- Born: March 14, 1941 Saint Paul, Minnesota
- Died: January 13, 2023 (aged 81)
- Party: Republican
- Spouse: Mary
- Children: eight
- Profession: real estate broker, businessman

Dick M. Kelly (March 14, 1941 – January 13, 2023) was an American politician. He served in the South Dakota Senate from 2002 to 2006.

Kelly died on January 13, 2023, at the age of 81.
