= 2018 Sioux Falls mayoral election =

- April 10, 2018; May 1, 2018
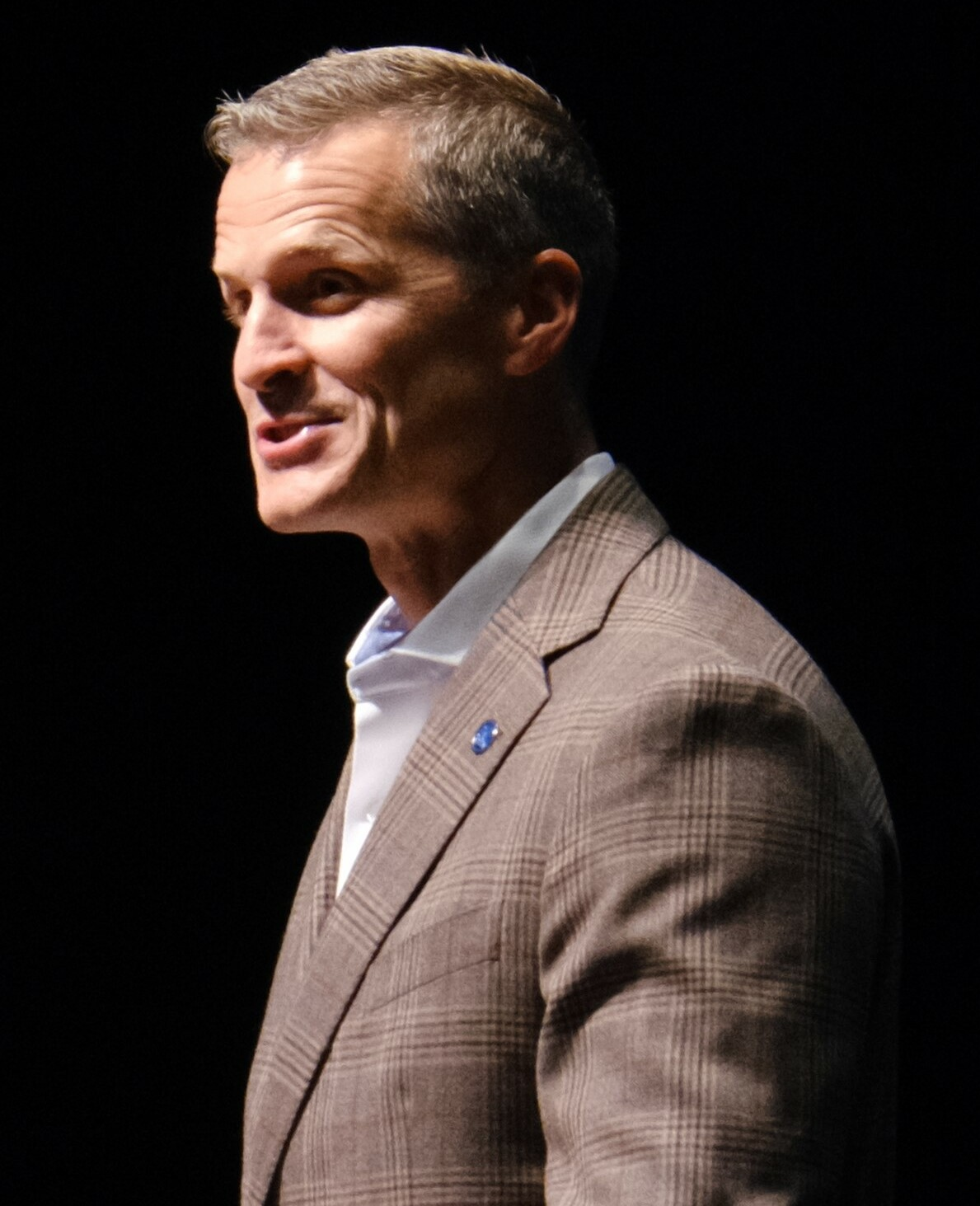

Candidate	Paul TenHaken	Jolene Loetscher
First round	10,925; 34.11%	7,973; 24.89%
Runoff	20,869; 62.70%	12,413; 37.30%
Candidate	Jim Entenman	Greg Jamison
First round	6,111; 19.08%	4,543; 14.18%
Runoff	Eliminated	Eliminated
Mayor before election
Mike Huether
Nonpartisan
Elected mayor
Paul TenHaken
Nonpartisan

The 2018 Sioux Falls mayoral election took place on May 1, 2018, following a primary election on April 10, 2018. Incumbent Mayor Mike Huether was term-limited and could not run for a third consecutive term. Businessman Paul TenHaken, the founder of a local digital marketing firm, placed first in the primary, winning 34 percent of the vote. Former television reporter Jolene Loetscher placed second with 25 percent, and both advanced to the general election. TenHaken defeated Loetscher by a wide margin, winning 63 percent of the vote.

== Primary election ==
=== Candidates ===
- Paul TenHaken, businessman, founder of digital marketing firm
- Jolene Loetscher, former television reporter, public policy advocate
- Jim Entenman, former City Councilmember
- Greg Jamison, State Representative, 2014 candidate for Mayor
- Kenny N. Anderson, Jr., former City Councilmember
- Mike Gunn, retired boat mechanic

=== Results ===
2018 Sioux Falls mayoral primary election
Party	Candidate	Votes	%
Nonpartisan	Paul TenHaken	10,925	34.11%
Nonpartisan	Jolene Loetscher	7,973	24.89%
Nonpartisan	Jim Entenman	6,111	19.08%
Nonpartisan	Greg Jamison	4,543	14.18%
Nonpartisan	Kenny N. Anderson, Jr.	2,136	6.67%
Nonpartisan	Mike Gunn	343	1.07%
Total votes		32,031	100.00%

== General election ==
=== Results ===
2018 Sioux Falls mayoral runoff election
Party	Candidate	Votes	%
Nonpartisan	Paul TenHaken	20,869	62.70%
Nonpartisan	Jolene Loetscher	12,413	37.30%
Total votes		33,282	100.00%
