= 2022 Sioux Falls mayoral election =

- April 12, 2022
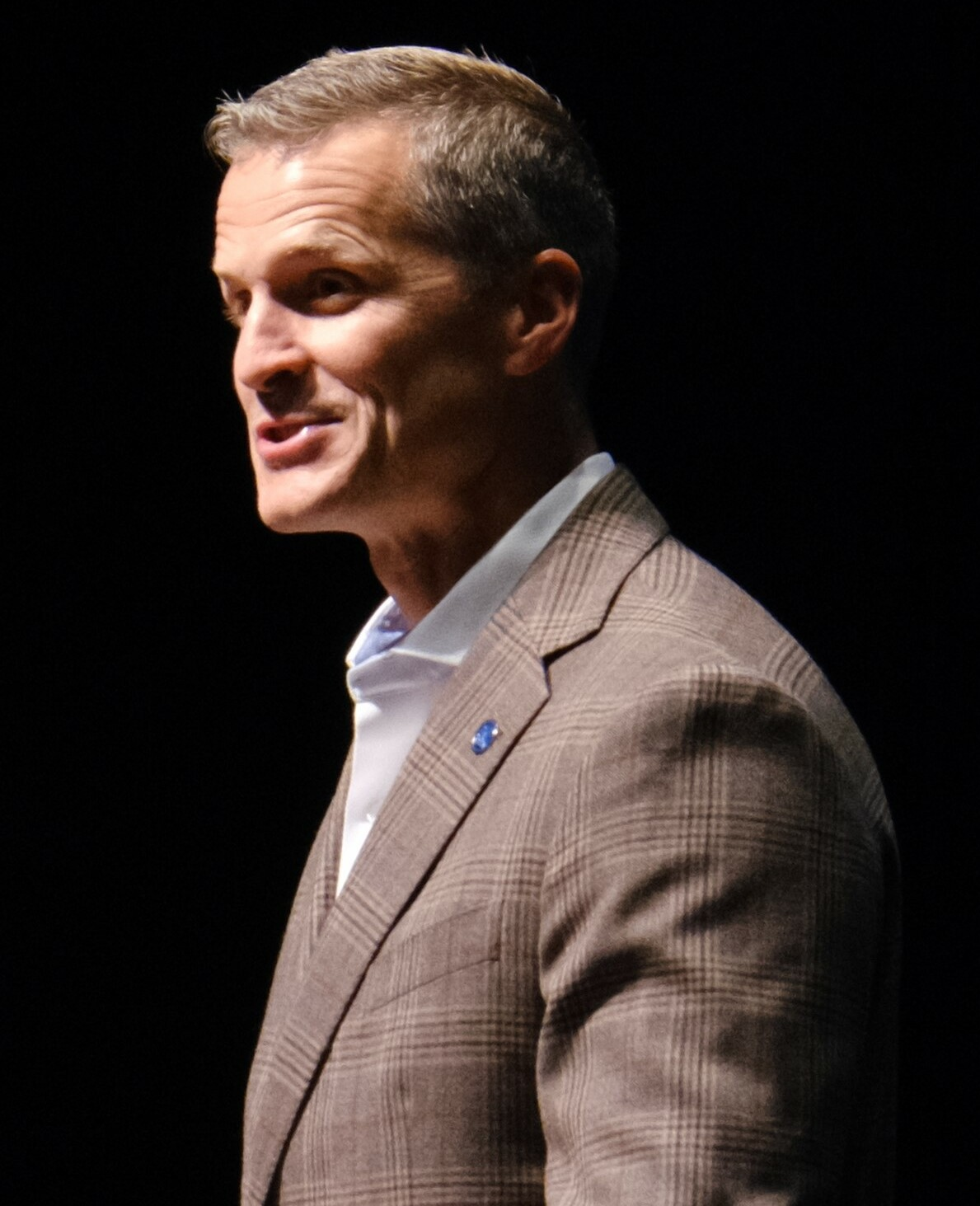

Candidate	Paul TenHaken	Taneeza Islam
Party	Nonpartisan	Nonpartisan
Popular vote	21,843	7,346
Percentage	73.39%	24.68%
Mayor before election
Paul TenHaken
Nonpartisan
Elected mayor
Paul TenHaken
Nonpartisan

The 2022 Sioux Falls mayoral election took place on April 12, 2022. Incumbent Mayor Paul TenHaken, first elected in 2018, ran for re-election to a second term. He faced two challengers: immigration attorney Taneeza Islam, who was one of the first Muslim candidates in the state history, and local activist David Zokaites. TenHaken defeated both in a landslide, winning 73 percent of the vote to Islam's 25 percent and Zokaites's 2 percent.

== Candidates ==
- Paul TenHaken, incumbent Mayor
- Taneeza Islam, immigration attorney, founder of South Dakota Voices for Peace
- David Zokaites, data analyst, local activist

== Results ==
2022 Sioux Falls mayoral primary election
Party	Candidate	Votes	%
Nonpartisan	Paul TenHaken (inc.)	21,843	73.39%
Nonpartisan	Taneeza Islam	7,346	24.68%
Nonpartisan	David Zokaites	574	1.93%
Total votes		29,763	100.00%
