= List of mayors of Sioux Falls, South Dakota =

The following is a list of mayors of the city of Sioux Falls, South Dakota, United States.

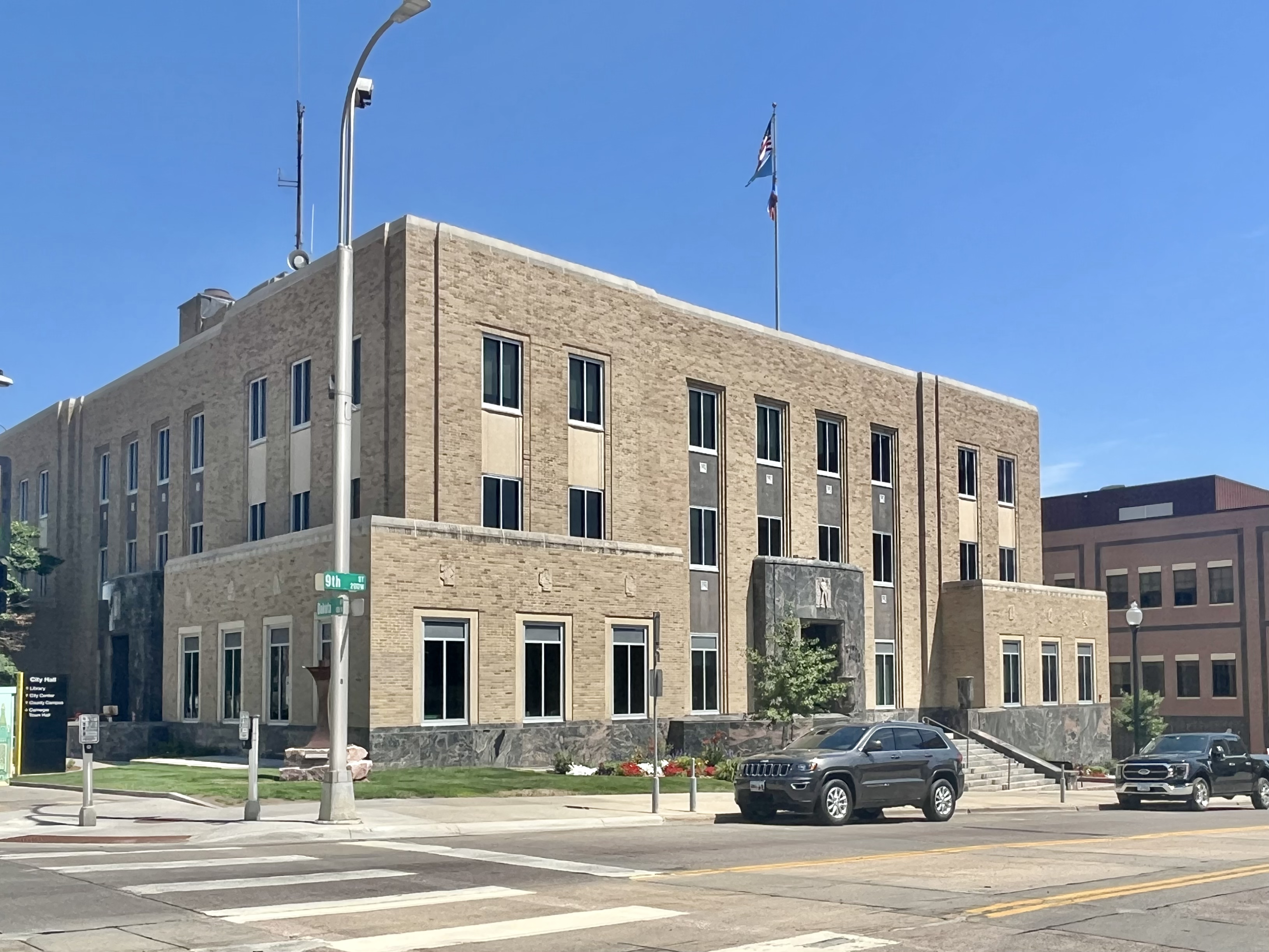
City hall building in Sioux Falls, South Dakota (photo 2023)

- Jacob Schaetzel, 1883–1884
- H.W. Ross, 1885–1886
- John F. Norton, 1887–1888
- Warner E. Willey, 1889
- Porter P. Peck, 1890–1893
- Roy Williams, 1894–1895
- A. H. Stites, 1896–1897
- Burre H. Lien, 1898–1899
- George W. Burnside, c.1900–1906, 1909–1924, 1929–1934
- Frank W. Pillsbury, 1906–1908
- W. T. Doolittle, 1908–1909
- Thomas M. McKinnon, 1924–1929
- Adolph Nelson Graff, 1934–1939
- John T. McKee, 1939–1942
- Joseph S. Nelson, 1942
- C. M. Whitfield, 1942–1949
- Henry B. Saure, 1949–1954
- Fay Wheeldon, 1954–1961
- V. L. Cruisenberry, 1961–1967
- Earl McCart, 1967–1968
- M. E. 'Mike' Schirme, 1968–1974
- Rick W. Knobe, 1974–1984
- Joe Cooper, 1984–1986
- Jack White, 1986–1994
- Gary W. Hanson, 1994–2002
- Dave Munson, 2002–2010
- Mike Huether, 2010–2018
- Paul TenHaken, 2018–2026
- Christine Erickson, 2026–present

== See also ==
- History of Sioux Falls, South Dakota
