= Mark Willadsen =

American politician

Member of the South Dakota House of Representatives from the 11th district
- In office January 13, 2015 – January 10, 2023
- Preceded by: Christine Erickson; Jim Stalzer
- Succeeded by: Brian Mulder
- In office January 11, 2011 – January 8, 2013
- Preceded by: Todd Schlekeway; Darrell Solberg
- Succeeded by: Christine Erickson; Jim Stalzer
- In office January 11, 2005 – January 13, 2009
- Preceded by: Keri Weems; Rebekah Cradduck
- Succeeded by: Todd Schlekeway; Darrell Solberg

Personal details
- Born: February 17, 1955 (age 71) Sioux Falls, South Dakota, U.S.
- Party: Republican

Mark Willadsen (born February 17, 1955) is an American politician who served in the South Dakota House of Representatives from the 11th district from 2015 to 2023. He previously served in the South Dakota House of Representatives from 2005 to 2009 and from 2011 to 2013.
