= Paul TenHaken =

American businessman and website developer

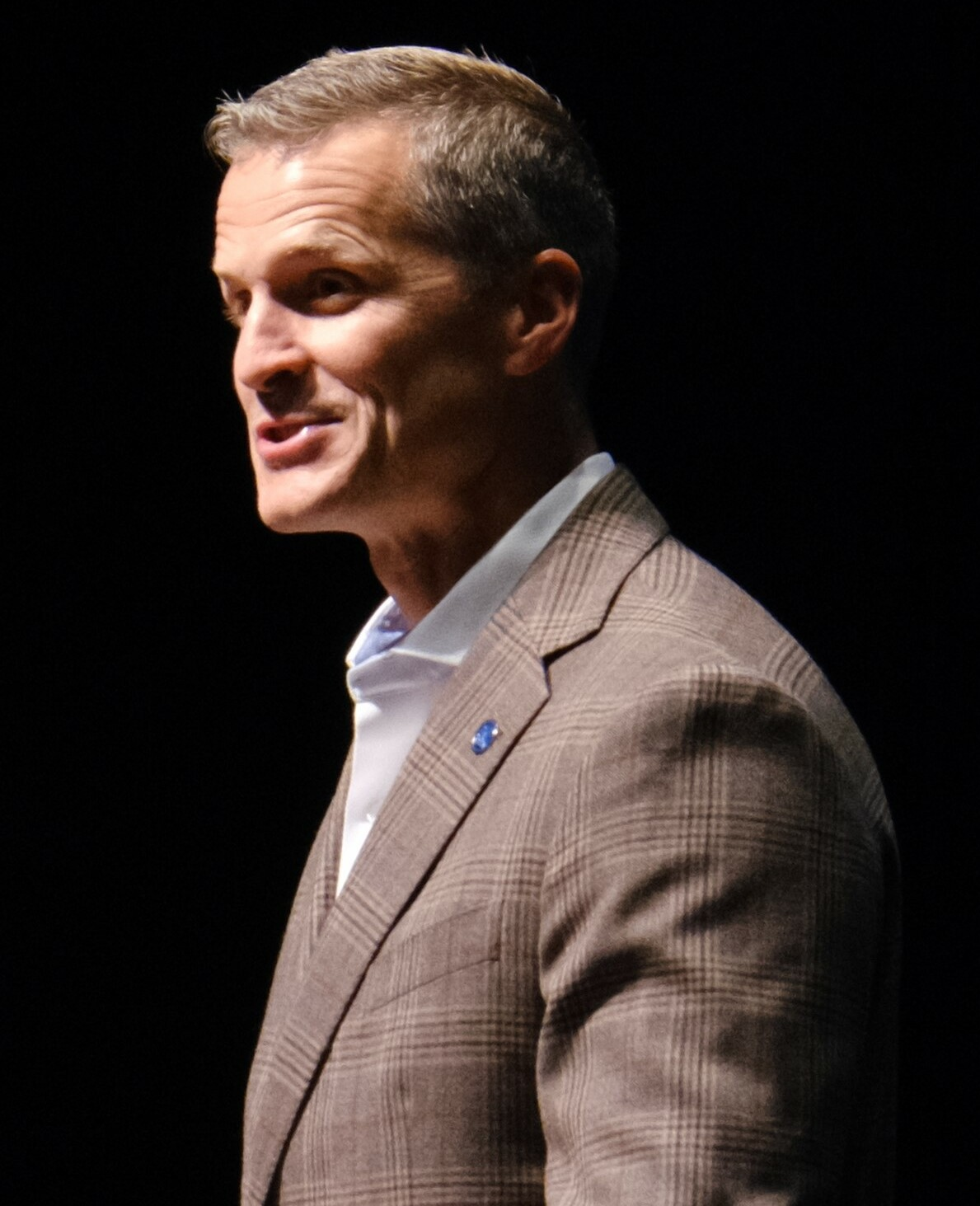

Mayor of Sioux Falls
- In office May 15, 2018 – July 17, 2026
- Preceded by: Mike Huether
- Succeeded by: Christine Erickson

Personal details
- Born: Paul Joseph TenHaken; November 13, 1977 (age 48) Sioux Center, Iowa, U.S.
- Party: Republican
- Spouse: Jill TenHaken
- Education: Dordt College (BA); University of Sioux Falls (MBA)
- Website: Official website

Paul Joseph TenHaken (born November 13, 1977) is an American businessman and website developer who served as the mayor of Sioux Falls, South Dakota from 2018 to 2026.

== Early life and education ==
TenHaken was born in Sioux Center, Iowa, to parents Lyle and Beth TenHaken. He was raised in Worthington, Minnesota. TenHaken attended Dordt College and received his degree in graphic design in 2000. Upon graduation, TenHaken moved to Sioux Falls, South Dakota, and worked as the mascot of the Sioux Falls Skyforce. He attended the University of Sioux Falls and received an MBA in 2004.

== Business career ==
TenHaken founded Click Rain, a marketing technology agency in Sioux Falls, in 2008. TenHaken was named one of Entrepreneur magazine's Top 10 Emerging Entrepreneurs as well as South Dakota Young Entrepreneur of the Year. TenHaken is also the co-founder of the Dispatch Project, a non-profit that organizes overseas mission opportunities for business leaders. His efforts have received accolades from Entrepreneur Magazine, When Work Works, Inc. Magazine, and Sioux Falls Business Journal.

== Mayor of Sioux Falls ==
In 2018, TenHaken ran for Mayor of Sioux Falls. He placed first in the April 10 primary election, winning 34 percent of the vote, and defeated former television reporter Jolene Loetscher in the runoff election on May 1 with 63 percent of the vote.

Ten Haken pushed to get a new city flag approved in 2018 after the election. The city officially adopted the flag on July 10, 2018, and by November 2018, the flag was being flown in front of city buildings and inside the mayor's office.

On April 9, 2020, over 80 employees at a Smithfield Foods pork processing plant in Sioux Falls were confirmed to have tested positive for COVID-19. The plant announced it would suspend operations beginning April 11. On April 14, 2020, TenHaken stated he would be proposing a stay at home order to the city council. After three days and tremendous backlash, he decided not to pursue the stay at home order. Mayor TenHaken is credited as saying it is difficult to lead locally in a non-partisan way. He has also said a mask mandate could 'destroy a city' due to how politicized the issue had become.

In 2022, TenHaken ran for re-election, and defeated attorney Taneeza Islam with 73 percent of the vote.

One of Mayor TenHaken's goals in office was to make Sioux Falls the fittest city in the country. He has implemented several programs to improve the city's health including a citywide running program, outdoor fitness courts and soccer pitches.

== See also ==
- List of mayors of Sioux Falls, South Dakota

Political offices
Preceded by Mike Huether	Mayor of Sioux Falls; 2018–2026	Succeeded by Christine Erickson
