= Thomas Holmes (politician) =

State politician from South Dakota

Member of the South Dakota House of Representatives from the 14th district
- Incumbent
- Assumed office 2015 Serving with Larry Zikmund

Personal details
- Born: September 19, 1949 (age 76)
- Party: Republican
- Profession: Educator

Thomas R. Holmes (born September 19, 1949) is an American former politician. He has served as a Republican member for the 14th district in the South Dakota House of Representatives since 2015. Before that, he was a social studies teacher at Roosevelt High School in Sioux Falls.
