= 2014 Sioux Falls mayoral election =

- April 8, 2014
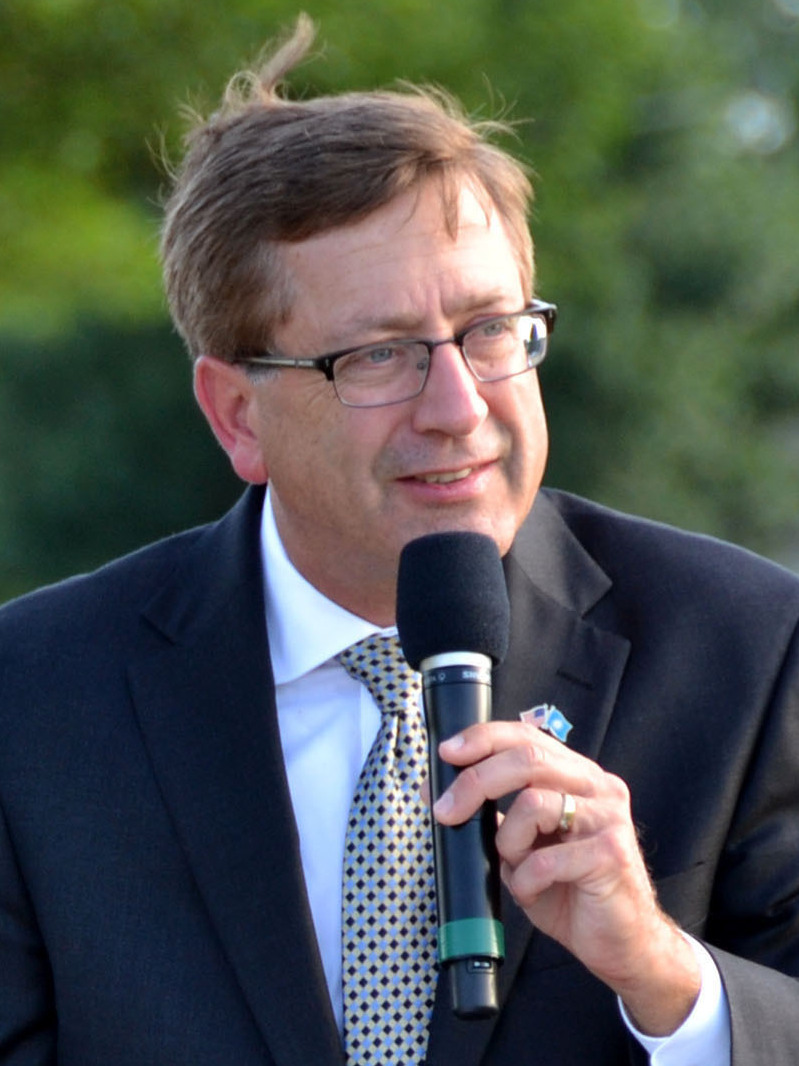

| Candidate | Mike Huether | Greg Jamison |
| Party | Nonpartisan | Nonpartisan |
| Popular vote | 17,612 | 13,939 |
| Percentage | 55.82% | 44.18% |
Mayor before election
Mike Huether
Nonpartisan
Elected mayor
Mike Huether
Nonpartisan

The 2014 Sioux Falls mayoral election took place on April 8, 2014. Incumbent Mayor Mike Huether, first elected in 2010, ran for re-election to a second term. He was challenged by City Councilmember Greg Jamison. Huether defeated Jamison by a wide margin, though slightly reduced from his margin four years earlier, winning 56–44 percent.

== Candidates ==
- Mike Huether, incumbent Mayor
- Greg Jamison, City Councilmember

== Campaign ==
Huether announced that he would seek a second term as mayor, arguing that he had "a pattern for getting stuff done for the city." Greg Jamison, a member of the City Council, announced that he would challenge Huether for re-election, and "sharply criticiz[ed] Huether in his announcement, saying, "If we don't change the culture at City Hall, the Sioux Falls I've grown [in] and the quality of life . . . is going to be ruined." Throughout the campaign, Jamison attacked Huether for his leadership style and unwillingness to compromise with others.

Though the race was formally nonpartisan, the county Republican Party sent a postcard attacking Huether, a Democrat, shortly before the election. The postcard compared Huether to then-President Barack Obama, said that he supported "higher taxes" and acted "like a dictator." Both Huether and Jamison, a Republican, condemned the postcard.

The Argus Leader endorsed Huether for another term, praising him for "presid[ing] over one of the more productive, transformative times in Sioux Falls history." Though the Argus Leader criticized him for "[h]is forceful approach to governing" and his "investment in a local development project," it noted that he was "a hard worker, a dedicated public servant and a driving, focused leader." It praised Jamison as "an earnest public servant, well-intentioned and dedicated," but not "the best fit for the mayor's position" when matched against Huether.

Ultimately, Huether defeated Jamison by a wide margin, winning 56 percent of the vote to Jamison's 43 percent.

== Results ==
2014 Sioux Falls mayoral primary election
| Party | Candidate | Votes | % |
|---|---|---|---|
| Nonpartisan | Mike Huether (inc.) | 17,612 | 56.66% |
| Nonpartisan | Greg Jamison | 13,939 | 44.18% |
| Total votes | | 31,551 | 100.00% |
