= Mike Huether =

American politician

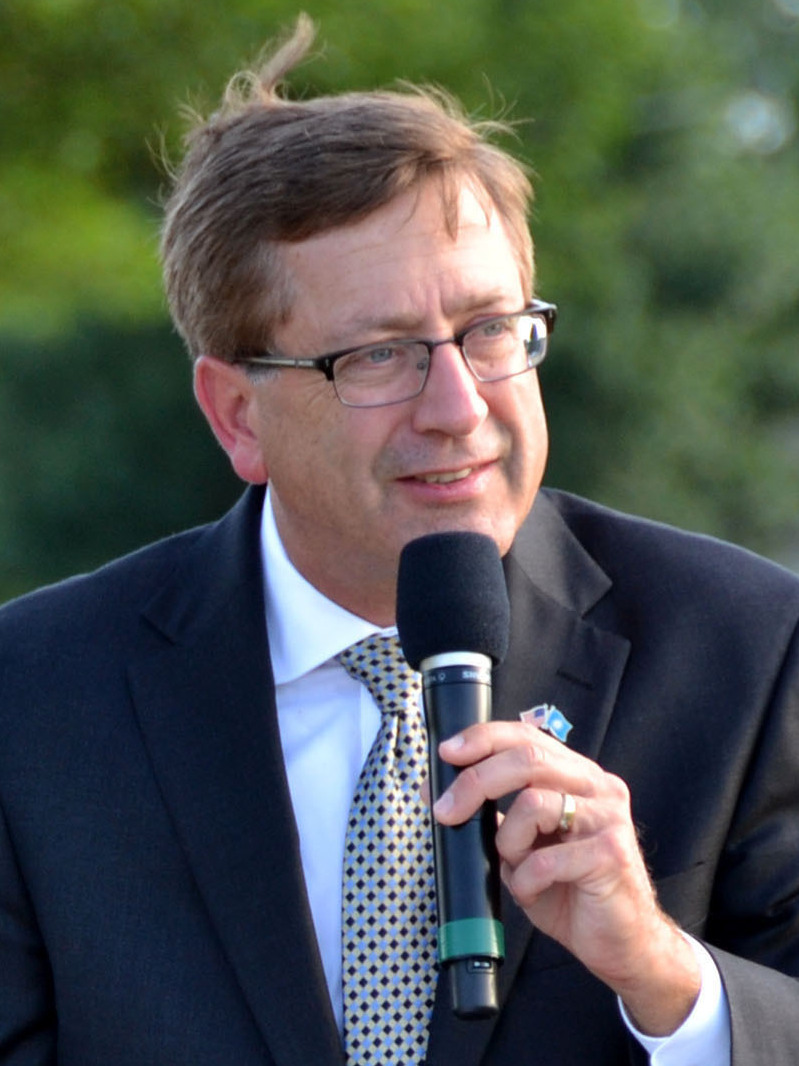

Mayor of Sioux Falls
- In office May 17, 2010 – May 15, 2018
- Preceded by: Dave Munson
- Succeeded by: Paul TenHaken

Personal details
- Born: July 24, 1962 (age 63) Yankton, South Dakota, U.S.
- Party: Democratic (before 2016); Independent (2016–present)
- Spouse: Cindy Huether
- Education: South Dakota State University (BA)

Mike Huether is an American businessman, real estate investor, philanthropist, and former politician from South Dakota. He served as mayor of Sioux Falls from 2010 to 2018.

== Personal life and education ==
Huether was born in Yankton, South Dakota, in 1962. In 1984, he attended South Dakota State University and acquired a commercial economics degree. He is married to his wife, Cindy, and has 1 daughter.

== Charity work ==
The Huether family runs a charity called "The Mike Cindy and Kylie Huether Family Foundation."

== Political career ==
Huether successfully ran for mayor in 2010. He placed second in the April 13, 2010, primary election, winning 25 percent of the vote. In the April 27 runoff election, he defeated City Councilmember and former State Senator Kermit Staggers by a wide margin, winning 57 percent of the vote to Staggers's 43 percent. In 2014, he defeated City Councilmember Greg Jamison, winning 56 percent of the vote to Jamison's 44 percent.

== See also ==
- List of mayors of Sioux Falls, South Dakota

Political offices
Preceded by Dave Munson	Mayor of Sioux Falls; 2010–2018	Succeeded by Paul TenHaken
