= 2002 Sioux Falls mayoral election =

- April 9, 2002; April 23, 2002

Candidate	Dave Munson	Dick Brown
First round	6,852; 27.53%	8,653; 34.76%
Runoff	12,890; 57.20%	9,643; 42.80%
Candidate	Bob Jamison	Tam Baker
First round	3,538; 14.21%	2,835; 11.39%
Runoff	Eliminated	Eliminated
Mayor before election
Gary W. Hanson
Nonpartisan
Elected mayor
Dave Munson
Nonpartisan

The 2002 Sioux Falls mayoral election took place on April 23, 2002, following a primary election on April 9, 2002. Incumbent Mayor Gary W. Hanson was term-limited and could not seek a third consecutive term. Seven candidates ran to succeed Nelson, and because no candidate won a majority in the first round, a runoff election was held. State Representative Dick Brown placed first in the primary with 35 percent of the vote, and he was opposed by State Senator Dave Munson, who won 28 percent, in the general election. Munson ended up defeating Brown by a wide margin, winning 57–43 percent.

== Primary election ==
=== Candidates ===
- Dick Brown, State Representative
- Dave Munson, State Senator
- Bob Jamison, City Councilmember
- Tam Baker, City Councilmember
- Tim Kant, businessman
- Curtis Rust, City Councilmember
- Robert Kolbe, Minnehaha County Commissioner

=== Results ===
2002 Sioux Falls mayoral primary election
Party	Candidate	Votes	%
Nonpartisan	Dick Brown	8,653	34.76%
Nonpartisan	Dave Munson	6,852	27.53%
Nonpartisan	Bob Jamison	3,538	14.21%
Nonpartisan	Tam Baker	2,835	11.39%
Nonpartisan	Tim Kant	1,740	6.99%
Nonpartisan	Curtis Rust	773	3.11%
Nonpartisan	Robert Kolbe	499	2.00%
Total votes		24,890	100.00%

== General election ==
2002 Sioux Falls mayoral runoff election
Party	Candidate	Votes	%
Nonpartisan	Dave Munson	12,890	57.20%
Nonpartisan	Dick Brown	9,643	42.80%
Total votes		22,533	100.00%
