= Keri Weems =

American politician (born 1965)

Member of the South Dakota House of Representatives from the 11th district
- Incumbent
- Assumed office January 14, 2025
- Preceded by: Chris Karr
- In office January 14, 2003 – January 13, 2009
- Preceded by: Mike Jaspers
- Succeeded by: Todd Schlekeway; Darrell Solberg

Personal details
- Born: November 8, 1965 (age 59); Minneapolis, Minnesota
- Political party: Republican

Keri Weems (born November 8, 1965) is an American politician who has served in the South Dakota House of Representatives from the 11th district since 2025. She previously served in the South Dakota House of Representatives from 2003 to 2009. She was reelected to the South Dakota House of Representatives from district 11 in 2024.
