= David Omdahl =

American politician

Member of the South Dakota Senate from the 11th district
- In office 2013–2017
- Preceded by: Todd Schlekeway
- Succeeded by: Jim Stalzer

Personal details
- Born: September 11, 1956 (age 69)
- Party: Republican
- Spouse: Bonnie

David M. Omdahl (born September 11, 1956) is an American politician and a former Republican member of the South Dakota Senate representing District 11 from 2013 to 2017.

== Elections ==
=== South Dakota state senate ===
- 2012 When incumbent Senate District 11 Republican senator Todd Schlekeway left the Legislature and left the seat open, Omdahl was unopposed for the June 5, 2012, Republican primary and won the November 6, 2012, general election with 5,888 votes (56.7%) against Democratic nominee Tom Cool, who had been the Democratic nominee for the seat in 2010.
