= Mitch Richter =

American politician

Member of the South Dakota House of Representatives from the 11th district
- In office January 10, 1995 – January 14, 2003
- Preceded by: William Sandness
- Succeeded by: Rebekah Cradduck

Personal details
- Born: September 5, 1960 (age 65) Suffern, New York
- Party: Republican

Mitch Richter (born September 5, 1960) is an American politician and lobbyist who served in the South Dakota House of Representatives from the 11th district from 1995 to 2003.

In 2024, Richter was a lobbyist for the South Dakota United Schools Association. As of 2026, Richter is a lobbyist for the South Dakota Farmers Union.
