= Kermit Staggers =

American politician (1947–2019)

Member of the South Dakota Senate from the 13th district
- In office 1995–2002
- Preceded by: Dennis Pierson
- Succeeded by: Dick M. Kelly

Personal details
- Born: Kermit LeMoyne Staggers II; November 2, 1947 Washington, Pennsylvania, U.S.
- Died: November 28, 2019 (aged 72) Sioux Falls, South Dakota, U.S.
- Party: Republican
- Spouse: June Ann
- Children: 2
- Education: University of Idaho; Claremont Graduate University
- Profession: Academic

Kermit LeMoyne Staggers II (November 2, 1947 – November 28, 2019) was an American politician. He served in the South Dakota Senate from 1995 to 2002. He unsuccessfully ran for Mayor of Sioux Falls, South Dakota in 2010.

== Biography ==
Staggers was born in Washington, Pennsylvania. He received his bachelor's and master's degrees from the University of Idaho. He then received his doctorate degree from Claremont Graduate University. Staggers served in the United States Air Force from 1970 to 1978 and was commissioned captain. In 1982 he moved with his wife and family and taught at the University of Sioux Falls from 1982 to 2016. He served on the Sioux Falls City Council from 2002 to 2012.

Staggers died while in hospice care in Sioux Falls on November 28, 2019, at the age of 72.
