= Dave Munson =

American politician

Mayor of Sioux Falls
- In office 2002–2010
- Preceded by: Gary Hanson
- Succeeded by: Mike Huether

Member of the South Dakota Senate from the 10th district
- In office 1996–2002
- Preceded by: Chet Jones
- Succeeded by: Gene G. Abdallah

Member of the South Dakota House of Representatives from the 10th district
- In office 1978–1996

Personal details
- Born: David R. Munson; April 16, 1942 (age 84) Sioux Falls, South Dakota, U.S.
- Party: Republican
- Education: Sioux Falls College (B.A.); Augustana College (M.A.)

David R. Munson (born 1942) is an American politician from South Dakota who served as a member of the state legislature and as the Mayor of Sioux Falls from 2002 to 2010.

Munson obtained his B.A. degree from Sioux Falls College and M.A. degree from Augustana College. For eight and a half years, he taught school. From 1977 to 1983, Munson worked as an independent insurance agent. He retired from CitiBank in December 2001 after 20 years with the bank as its government affairs officer.

In 1978, he was elected to represent Minnehaha County in the South Dakota State House of Representatives. In 1981, Munson became Republican precinct committee-man. From 1983–84, he was House majority whip. His tenure in the state house ended in 1996, as he won a seat on the South Dakota Senate, representing the 10th district until his resignation on May 17, 2002.

In 2002, Munson ran for Mayor of Sioux Falls. He defeated State Representative Dick Brown with 57 percent of the vote. In 2006, as Munson faced a campaign finance controversy, he initially announced that he would not seek re-election. However, he changed his mind and opted to seek re-election, and ultimately defeated Augustana College President Bruce Halverson by a narrow margin, winning 52 percent of the vote.

Munson was the subject of a number of skits on The Caribou Show. He is a former member of the Mayors Against Illegal Guns Coalition. His split from the group was well-publicized.

== See also ==
- List of mayors of Sioux Falls, South Dakota
