= Joni Cutler =

American politician

Member of the South Dakota House of Representatives from the 14th district
- In office 2003–2010

Member of the South Dakota Senate from the 14th district
- In office 2011–2012
- Preceded by: Dave Knudson
- Succeeded by: Deb Soholt

Personal details
- Born: March 28, 1956 (age 70)
- Party: Republican
- Education: University of South Dakota (JD)
- Profession: Attorney

Joni M. Clark Cutler (born March 28, 1956) is an American former politician. She served in the South Dakota Senate from 2011 to 2013.
