= University of Sioux Falls =

Baptist college in Sioux Falls, South Dakota, US

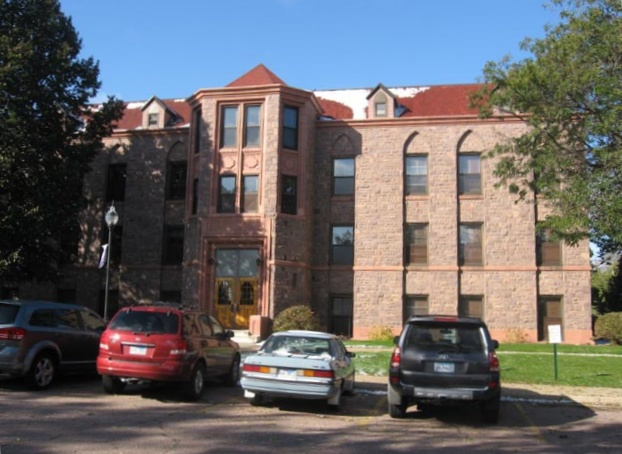
- Glidden-Martin Hall in 2009
- Former names: Dakota Collegiate Institute (1883–1885); Sioux Falls University (1885–1931); Sioux Falls College (1931–1995)
- Motto: Culture for Service
- Type: Private university
- Established: 1883; 143 years ago
- Religious affiliation: American Baptist Churches USA
- Endowment: $30.3 million (2019)
- President: Brett Bradfield
- Academic staff: 103
- Students: 1,453
- Location: Sioux Falls, South Dakota, U.S. 43°31′50.8″N 96°44′19.3″W
- Colors: Purple & White
- Nickname: Cougars
- Sporting affiliations: Division II – NSIC
- Website: usiouxfalls.edu
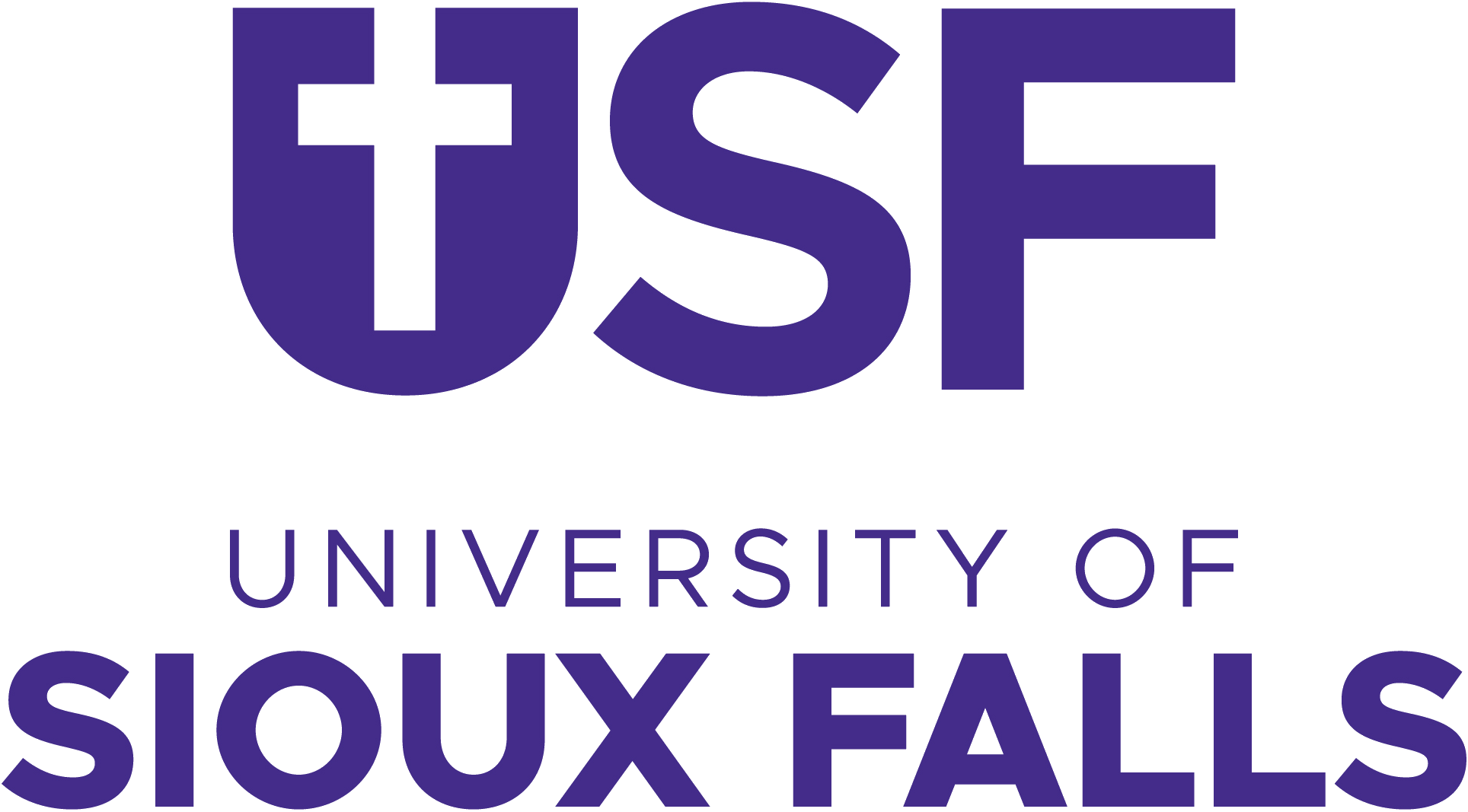

The University of Sioux Falls (USF) is a private university in Sioux Falls, South Dakota, United States, affiliated with the American Baptist Churches USA. In fall 2014, the university enrolled a total of 1,142 undergraduate students and 311 graduate students.

== History ==
=== Founding and early history ===
On June 5, 1872, pastors and delegates of nine Baptist churches in the Dakota Territory gathered in Vermillion, South Dakota, at the first meeting of the Baptist Association. They adopted the following resolution:

Be it resolved that we take immediate steps for the establishment of an institution among us and that we devote a suitable portion of time at each annual meeting of the consideration of this important subject and give our individual associated influence to encourage a more general and complete education of our youth under distinctly Christian influence.

Under the name of Dakota Collegiate Institute, secondary and collegiate programs began on September 8, 1883. The institution's name changed to Sioux Falls University in 1885, with the secondary program called the academy and the collegiate department branded Sioux Falls College. Although the college grew, the academy's enrollment declined, forcing it to close in 1925.

Between 1929 and 1931, Sioux Falls College acquired four Baptist schools that had ceased to operate: Des Moines University, Des Moines, Iowa; Grand Island College, Grand Island, Nebraska; Cedar Valley Seminary, Osage, Iowa; and Parker College, Winnebago, Minnesota. With the 1931 merger of Grand Island College with what was still legally Sioux Falls University, the institution's official name became Sioux Falls College.

During the Second World War, the college lost its accreditation and offered 200 students, mainly women, two-year degrees. Enrollment surged when the veterans returned home, only to lapse to meager numbers two years later. Financially, the school was in dire straits.

=== Expansion ===
Reuben P. Jeschke helped regain full, regional accreditation in 1958, and under his leadership enrollment grew from 378 in 1958 to 1,006 in 1968 – a 166 percent increase. The institution's endowment, although modest, also grew, and what Jeschke described as a "near miracle" happened – a history of balanced budgets.

The most-visible change during this time was the campus. Jeschke oversaw the building of Mears Library, Salsbury Student Union, Salsbury Science Center, Jeschke Fine Arts Center and three residence halls. Time magazine featured the college's growth in 1967 with the caption "Seven Buildings in Seven Years" and the subtitle "But our stature comes from people". By the end of Jeschke's tenure, Sioux Falls College was well-positioned for the steady success of the 1970s and 1980s.

The 1980s saw the addition of a Degree Completion Program and graduate studies. Today, USF offers four graduate programs: Master of Education (M.Ed.), Master of Business Administration (M.B.A.), Education Specialist (Ed.S.), and a joint doctoral degree in leadership with the University of St. Thomas in Saint Paul, Minn. USF also offers adult education programs: accelerated nursing and RN-to-BSN.

Sioux Falls College became the University of Sioux Falls in 1995.

Mark Benedetto became the 22nd president in 1997. He was succeeded by Brett Bradfield who became the 23rd president in 2017 after working at the University for 16 years.

In 2008, USF received a $2 million Title III grant from the Department of Education to start a nursing program. This grant provided funds for two simulation labs and the renovation of existing science lab facilities. The nursing program offers a 15-month accelerated program, an RN-to-BSN program and a traditional undergraduate program.

In 2011, the university added the USF Sculpture Walk to its campus and publicly kicked off its fundraising campaign titled the Uncampaign that ran through 2020.

In 2012, USF built a new Media Studies Center, created a new Music Technology lab for Music majors and added an IdeaLab for Entrepreneurial Studies majors.

== Accreditation ==
It is affiliated with the American Baptist Churches USA.

== Academics ==
The University of Sioux Falls is accredited by the Higher Learning Commission. The undergraduate and graduate teacher education programs in the Fredrikson School of Education are accredited by the Council for Accreditation of Educator Preparation and approved by the South Dakota Division of Education. The university's social work program is accredited by the Council on Social Work Education and the university's nursing programs are accredited by the Commission for Collegiate Nursing Education. The undergraduate and graduate programs in the Vucurevich School of Business are accredited by the International Assembly for Collegiate Business Education.

The university also maintains membership in the South Dakota Association of Independent Colleges, the Council of Independent Colleges, the Association of South Dakota Colleges and Universities, and the American Association of Colleges for Teacher Education.

=== Academic offerings ===
USF offers undergraduate programs, pre-professional programs, and graduate and adult-learning programs.

USF's study-abroad partner institutions include: Nelson Mandela Metropolitan University in Port Elizabeth, South Africa; The American University of Greece, DEREE in Athens, Greece; Handong Global University in Pohang, Korea; and Universidad del Este in San Juan, Puerto Rico. Students may also apply for international study in one of USF's 10 CCCU semester-abroad programs.

== Student life ==
USF offers more than 100 clubs, organizations and activities to join, 16 NCAA Division II varsity sports and a wide variety of service opportunities. In addition, USF has weekly activities on campus such as Winter and Summer Olympics, monster golf, Pac Man competitions, speed dating and more. Campus growth has been paramount since 1997, with the addition of new programs, the increase in enrollment and the expansion of USF's physical footprint.

=== Student media ===
- KCFS FM is the campus student radio station.
- KCSD is the campus public broadcasting station in partnership with South Dakota Public Broadcasting (SDPB).
- The Vessel is the newspaper of the University of Sioux Falls Student Association.
- USF College Week is the student run weekly news broadcast.

== Athletics ==
The Sioux Falls (USF) athletic teams are called the Cougars. The university is a member of the NCAA Division II ranks, primarily competing in the Northern Sun Intercollegiate Conference (NSIC) since the 2012–13 academic year. Prior to joining the National Collegiate Athletic Association (NCAA), the Cougars previously competed in the Great Plains Athletic Conference (GPAC) of the National Association of Intercollegiate Athletics (NAIA) from 2000–01 to 2010–11; and in the defunct South Dakota Intercollegiate Conference (SDIC) from 1977–78 to 1999–2000.

USF competes in 19 intercollegiate varsity sports: Men's sports include baseball, basketball, cross country, football, golf, indoor & outdoor track & field, and wrestling; while women's sports include basketball, cheerleading, cross country, golf, soccer, softball, swimming & diving, tennis, indoor & outdoor track & field, volleyball & wrestling. Former sports included wrestling and men's tennis, as both were dropped once USF moved to NCAA Division II in 2011. In the spring of 2013, USF dropped Men's Soccer after one year in DII. The tennis team had made five trips to the NAIA Championships in 2003, 2004, 2007, 2008, and 2010. Wrestling eventually made a return to the school in 2022, when USF became the first school in South Dakota to add both Men's and Women's intercollegiate wrestling programs.

On April 28, 2009, the university board of trustees voted to leave the NAIA and apply to join the NCAA Division II ranks. After successful completion of two candidacy years and a provisional year in 2011–12, USF gained full membership into the NCAA.

== Alumni ==
- Kalen DeBoer, college football coach
- Brian Hansen, professional football player
- Paul TenHaken, mayor of Sioux Falls, South Dakota
- Crystal Johnson, attorney
- Trey Pipkins, professional football player
