= Linda Duba =

American politician

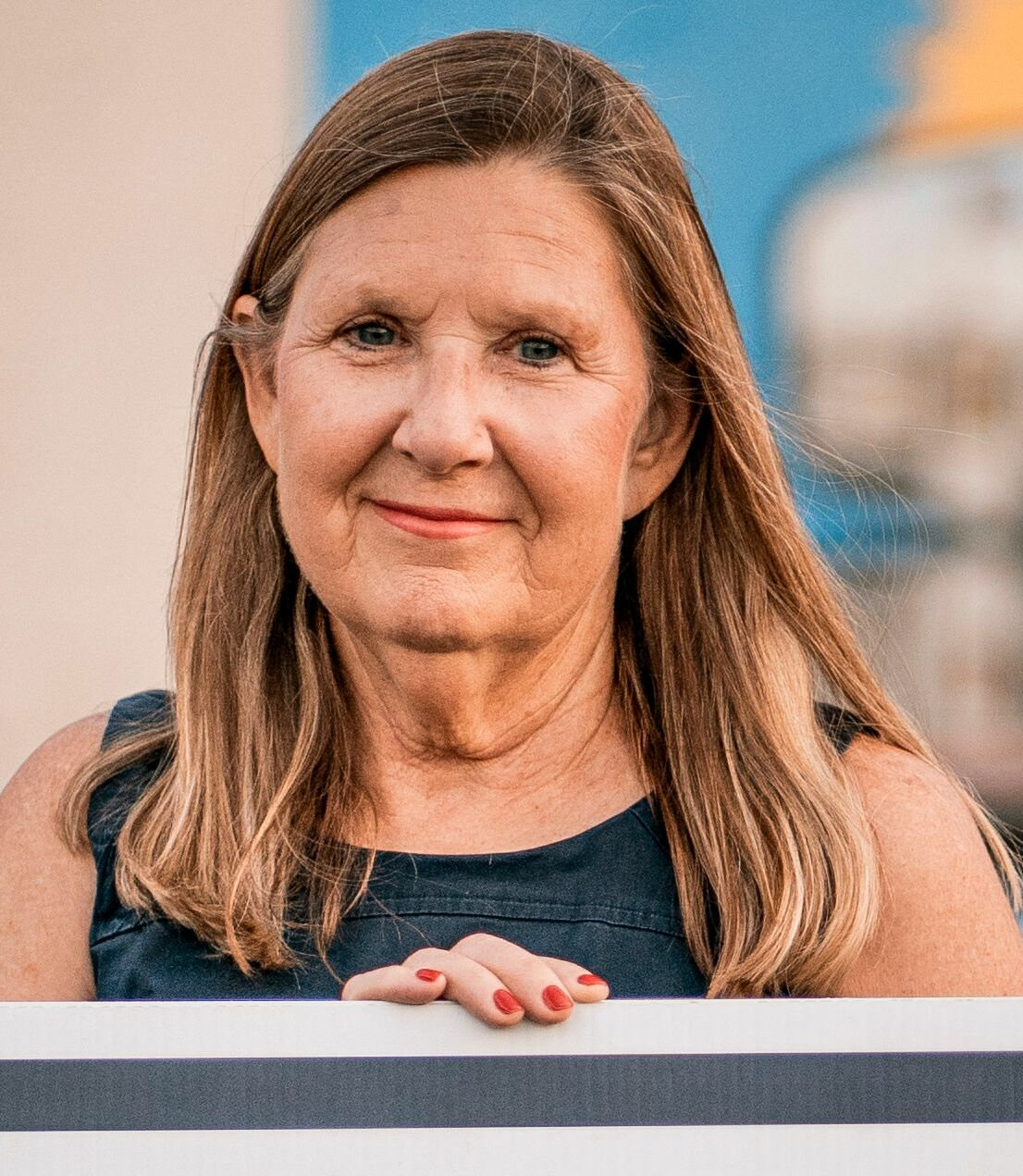

Member of the South Dakota House of Representatives from the 15th district
- In office January 2019 – January 14, 2025 Serving with Jamie Smith

Personal details
- Born: Sioux Falls, South Dakota, U.S.
- Party: Democratic
- Education: South Dakota State University (BS)
- Website: https://dubaforsdhouse.com

Linda Duba (born August 24, 1956) is an American politician and educator based in Sioux Falls, South Dakota. She serves in the South Dakota lower house as one of the Democratic representatives of the 15th District along with Jamie Smith. Her district covers the northern part of Sioux Falls including the Downtown, Whittier, Cathedral, Terrace park, West 10th Street, and Garfield neighborhoods. The 15th District lies completely within Minnehaha county. Duba succeeded Representative Karen Soli in 2019.

Duba was an outwardly supportive of the 2022 Democratic Nominee for Governor, Jamie Smith. She has also been outspoken about the abortion ban in South Dakota and Governor Kristi Noem's lack of action to make exceptions to the ban. Duba supports the investigative committee into Governor Noem's use of state finances.

Duba ran again in 2022 as a Lower House Representative for District 15.

== Early life and education ==
Duba was born and raised in Sioux Falls, South Dakota. She earned a Bachelor of Science degree in Physical Education and Recreation/Athletic Training from South Dakota State University in 1978.

== Career ==
Duba began her professional career as a teacher and coach for the Sioux Falls school district from 1978 to 1979. She then worked for Sioux Falls Catholic schools as a Physical Education teacher and Coach from 1979 to 1982. In 1982 she became the vice president of Branding Advertisement Quality and Privacy/Operations Management at Citigroup. During the same time, Duba was also the Vice President of Customer Experience at Citicorp. In 2008, she ended both executive positions. She worked for NICE Systems from 2009-2016 as a business consultant. From 2016 to 2018, she was the coordinator for Girls on the Run and Heart and Sole. Duba started her current Educational Assistant job in 2018. She became a Representative in 2019.

=== Political career ===
Duba ran as a Democrat in 2018 against Jamie Smith(D) and won with a 52.8% majority. In 2020, she ran again, against Jamie Smith(D), Cole Heisey(R), and Matt Rosburg(R) and won with a 28.9% majority. Her main focuses include improving the mental and physical health of South Dakotas and protecting and enhancing education at all levels from Pre-K to College.

==== South Dakota State Legislature ====
Duba has served in the South Dakota Lower house for 3 years. Duba was previously on the House Retirement Laws and House Taxation Committee. She is now a member of the House Government Operations and Audit, House Retirement Laws, House Appropriations, and Joint Appropriations Committee. Duba has sponsored 135 bills since being elected. She is an avid ally of the LGBTQI+ community and advocates for women's body autonomy after sharing her own abortion experience.

=== Political positions and sponsored bills ===
==== Legislative oversight ====
Duba is a firm believer in the Check and Balances of the government branches. She sponsored HB 1041 during the 2022 session to ensure legislative oversight of the other branches of state government.

==== Education ====
Duba supports an increase in educator pay and sponsored a bill to prolong the requirements for increasing teacher compensation that was passed in 2022. She supports anti-discrimination practices in sports such as discrimination of hair and sex.

==== Abortion ====
Duba believes in body autonomy and the right for a woman to have an abortion, especially in cases of rape and incest. She also supports minors' rights when pregnant and their ability to make decisions about their health. A bill to clarify the agreements and arrangements between gestational surrogacy actors was sponsored by Duba during the 2022 session.

==== Native Americans and reservations ====
Duba is an ally to the Native Americans on reservations in South Dakota. She sponsored numerous bills to improve the relationship between the Bureau of Indian Affairs and South Dakota's state government. She also supports changing the names of places and monuments that use offensive language and/or phrases. Duba also sponsored a bill to incorporate the Oceti Sakowin Essential Understandings into the state social studies curriculum. It failed in committee in 2022. She sponsored a bill during the 2022 session to also investigate soldiers awarded the Medal of Honor for the Wounded Knee Massacre of 1890.

==== Marijuana ====
Duba works to enact the laws of voters by supporting the legalization of medicinal and recreational marijuana after voters passed Initiative Measure 26 and Constitutional Amendment A in 2020.

==== Health and human resources ====
Duba supports lessening the burden of medical laws on those who are disabled, mentally and physically. She supports disabled veterans and their entitlement to mental health care. Duba has sponsored legislation to increase transparency in medication practices and decrease the price of necessary drugs.

==== LGBTQIA+ ====
Duba sponsored legislation to celebrate and recognize the LGBTQ+ and Two-Spirit communities. She also opposed legislation against transgender minors playing sports.

== Personal life ==
Duba has three children and lives in Sioux Falls, South Dakota. She is Catholic.
