= Kristie Fiegen =

American politician

Member of the South Dakota Public Utilities Commission
- Incumbent
- Assumed office August 9, 2011
- Appointed by: Dennis Daugaard
- Preceded by: Steve Kolbeck

Personal details
- Born: September 17, 1962 (age 63) Sioux Falls, South Dakota, U.S.
- Party: Republican
- Education: South Dakota State University (BS); University of South Dakota (MBA)

Kristie Fiegen is a Republican politician from South Dakota and Vice Chairman of the South Dakota Public Utilities Commission. From 1994 to 2001, she served in the South Dakota House of Representatives.

== Biography ==
Fiegen was born on September 17, 1962. She grew up on a farm in Chancellor, South Dakota. She graduated in Commercial Economics and Agricultural Business from South Dakota State University, and received a Master's degree in Business Administration from the University of South Dakota.

She served as a South Dakota area representative for the National Multiple Sclerosis Society for nine years and as a sales representative for Monsanto Company. Since 1994, she has served as President of the South Dakota chapter of Junior Achievement. From 1999 to 2001, she served on the Xcel Energy South Dakota Advisory Board.

From 1994 to 2001, she served in the South Dakota House of Representatives. On August 9, 2011, in the wake of Steve Kolbeck's resignation, she was appointed Vice Chairman of the South Dakota Public Utilities Commission by Governor Dennis Daugaard.

== Personal life ==
She has been involved with the Rotary Club, the United Way and Toastmasters. She is a Baptist. She is married with two children, Alex and Jackson Fiegen. She lives in Sioux Falls, South Dakota. Her husband, Dr Tim Fiegen, is a Professor of Education at Dakota State University.

Political offices
Preceded by Steve Kolbeck	Member of the South Dakota Public Utilities Commission; 2011–present	Incumbent
