= Todd Schlekeway =

American politician

Todd Schlekeway (born April 12, 1977) is a former state senator who represented District 11 in the South Dakota legislature from 2009 to 2013, from Minnehaha County, South Dakota Schlekeway is a member of the Republican Party. Prior to becoming a state senator Schlekeway served as a representative in district 11.

On Sept. 11, 2023, the Radio Club of America named Schlekeway to receive its Jay Kitchen Leadership Award, to be given during the club's awards banquet in Denver on Nov. 18, 2023. "Established in 2019, this award recognizes an individual who embodies the following characteristics: energetic advocacy, cooperation, avid interest and respect for all, and humor, and for someone who has achieved a high level of success leading a wireless association, government agency, or commercial enterprise," a statement from the club reads.
