= Elections in South Dakota =

Elections are held in the U.S. state of South Dakota regularly.

In a 2020 study, South Dakota was ranked as the 22nd hardest state for citizens to vote in.

== Lists of elections since 2000 ==
2000 South Dakota elections
2002 South Dakota elections
2004 South Dakota elections
2006 South Dakota elections
2008 South Dakota elections
2010 South Dakota elections
2012 South Dakota elections
2014 South Dakota elections
2016 South Dakota elections
2018 South Dakota elections
2020 South Dakota elections
2022 South Dakota elections
2024 South Dakota elections
2026 South Dakota elections

== Federal elections ==
=== Presidential elections ===
List of presidential elections in South Dakota since 2000:

2000 United States presidential election in South Dakota
2004 United States presidential election in South Dakota
2008 United States presidential election in South Dakota
2012 United States presidential election in South Dakota
2016 United States presidential election in South Dakota
2020 United States presidential election in South Dakota
2024 United States presidential election in South Dakota

=== US House elections ===
List of United States House of Representatives elections in South Dakota since 2000:

2000 United States House of Representatives election in South Dakota
2002 United States House of Representatives election in South Dakota
2004 South Dakota's at-large congressional district special election
2004 United States House of Representatives election in South Dakota
2006 United States House of Representatives election in South Dakota
2008 United States House of Representatives election in South Dakota
2010 United States House of Representatives election in South Dakota
2012 United States House of Representatives election in South Dakota
2014 United States House of Representatives election in South Dakota
2016 United States House of Representatives election in South Dakota
2018 United States House of Representatives election in South Dakota
2020 United States House of Representatives election in South Dakota
2022 United States House of Representatives election in South Dakota
2024 United States House of Representatives election in South Dakota

=== US Senate elections ===
List of United States Senate elections in South Dakota since 2000:

2002 United States Senate election in South Dakota (Class 2)
2004 United States Senate election in South Dakota (Class 3)
2010 United States Senate election in South Dakota (Class 3)
2014 United States Senate election in South Dakota (Class 2)
2016 United States Senate election in South Dakota (Class 3)
2020 United States Senate election in South Dakota (Class 2)
2022 United States Senate election in South Dakota (Class 3)
2026 United States Senate election in South Dakota (Class 2)
2028 United States Senate election in South Dakota (Class 3)

== Ballot measures ==
2006 South Dakota Amendment C
2008 South Dakota Initiated Measure 9
2008 South Dakota Initiated Measure 10
2010 South Dakota ballot measures
2020 South Dakota Amendment A
2020 South Dakota Amendment B
2020 South Dakota Measure 26
2022 South Dakota Amendment C
2022 South Dakota Amendment D
2022 South Dakota Initiated Measure 27

== Statewide elections ==
=== Gubernatorial elections ===
The Governor of South Dakota is elected every 4 years. Kristi Noem, the incumbent Governor, was elected in 2018 with 51.0% of the vote, and re-elected in 2022 with 61.9% of the vote. She is the first female governor of the state. Republicans have controlled the governorship since 1979.

List of gubernatorial elections since 2000:

2002 South Dakota gubernatorial election
2006 South Dakota gubernatorial election
2010 South Dakota gubernatorial election
2014 South Dakota gubernatorial election
2018 South Dakota gubernatorial election
2022 South Dakota gubernatorial election
2026 South Dakota gubernatorial election

== State legislative elections ==
Elections for seats in the South Dakota Legislature are held every even-numbered year. Every seat is contested on every election. The Republican Party holds supermajorities in both chambers, holding a 30–to–4 advantage over Democrats in the state senate, and a 62–to–7 advantage in the state house. Republicans have held both chambers of the legislature since 1995.

List of state legislative elections since 2000:

2000 – Senate, House
2002 – Senate, House
2004 – Senate, House
2006 – Senate, House
2008 – Senate, House
2010 – Senate, House
2012 – Senate, House
2014 – Senate, House
2016 – Senate, House
2018 – Senate, House
2020 – Senate, House
2022 – Senate, House
2024 – Senate, House

== See also ==
- United States presidential elections in South Dakota
- Women's suffrage in South Dakota
- Elections in the United States
