= List of United States representatives from South Dakota =

The following is an alphabetical list of United States representatives from the state of South Dakota. For chronological tables of members of both houses of the United States Congress from the state (through the present day), see South Dakota's congressional delegations. The list of names should be complete (as of January 3, 2019), but other data may be incomplete. It includes members who have represented only the state both past and present, as the Dakota Territory encompassed in addition North Dakota, and parts of present-day Wyoming, Montana, and Idaho.

== Current member ==
As of January 3, 2025

- South Dakota's at-large district: Dusty Johnson (R) (since 2019)

== List of members ==
Member	Party	Years	District	Notes
James Abdnor	Republican	January 3, 1973 – January 3, 1981	2nd	Elected in 1972. Re-elected in 1974. Re-elected in 1976. Re-elected in 1978. Retired to run for U.S. senator.
James Abourezk	Democratic	January 3, 1971 – January 3, 1973	2nd	Elected in 1970. Retired to run for U.S. senator.
E. Y. Berry	Republican	January 3, 1951 – January 3, 1971	2nd	Elected in 1950. Re-elected in 1952. Re-elected in 1954. Re-elected in 1956. Re-elected in 1958. Re-elected in 1960. Re-elected in 1962. Re-elected in 1964. Re-elected in 1966. Re-elected in 1968. Retired.
Charles H. Burke	Republican	March 4, 1899 – March 3, 1907	At-large	Elected in 1898. Re-elected in 1900. Re-elected in 1902. Re-elected in 1904. Lost renomination to Hall.
Charles H. Burke	Republican	March 4, 1909 – March 3, 1913	At-large	Elected in 1908. Re-elected in 1910; Redistricted to the 1st district.
Charles H. Burke	Republican	March 4, 1913 – March 3, 1915	2nd	Redistricted from the at-large district and re-elected in 1912; Retired to run for U.S. senator.
Francis Case	Republican	January 3, 1937 – January 3, 1951	2nd	Elected in 1936. Re-elected in 1938. Re-elected in 1940. Re-elected in 1942. Re-elected in 1944. Re-elected in 1946. Re-elected in 1948. Retired to run for U.S. senator.
Charles A. Christopherson	Republican	March 4, 1919 – March 3, 1933	1st	Elected in 1918. Re-elected in 1920. Re-elected in 1922. Re-elected in 1924. Re-elected in 1926. Re-elected in 1928. Re-elected in 1930. Lost re-election to Hildebrandt.
Tom Daschle	Democratic	January 3, 1979 – January 3, 1983	1st	Elected in 1978. Re-elected in 1980. Redistricted to the at-large district.
Tom Daschle	Democratic	January 3, 1983 – January 3, 1987	At-large	Redistricted from the 1st district and re-elected in 1982. Re-elected in 1984. Retired to run for U.S. Senator.
Frank E. Denholm	Democratic	January 3, 1971 – January 3, 1975	1st	Elected in 1970. Re-elected in 1972. Lost re-election to Pressler.
Charles H. Dillon	Republican	March 4, 1913 – March 3, 1919	1st	Elected in 1912. Re-elected in 1914. Re-elected in 1916. Lost renomination to Christopherson.
John Rankin Gamble	Republican	March 4, 1891 - August 14, 1891	At-large	Elected in 1890. Died.
Robert J. Gamble	Republican	March 4, 1895 – March 3, 1897	At-large	Elected in 1894. Lost re-election to Knowles.
Robert J. Gamble	Republican	March 4, 1899 – March 3, 1901	At-large	Elected in 1898. Retired to run for U.S. senator.
Harry L. Gandy	Democratic	March 4, 1915 – March 3, 1921	3rd	Elected in 1914. Re-elected in 1916. Re-elected in 1918. Lost re-election to Williamson.
Oscar S. Gifford	Republican	November 2, 1889 – March 3, 1891	At-large	Elected in 1889. Lost renomination to J.R. Gamble.
Philo Hall	Republican	March 4, 1907 – March 3, 1909	At-large	Elected in 1906. Lost renomination to Burke.
Stephanie Herseth Sandlin	Democratic	June 3, 2004 – January 3, 2011	At-large	Elected to finish Janklow's term. Re-elected in 2004. Re-elected in 2006. Re-elected in 2008. Lost re-election to Noem.
Fred H. Hildebrandt	Democratic	March 4, 1933 – January 3, 1939	1st	Elected in 1932. Re-elected in 1934. Re-elected in 1936. Retired to run for U.S. senator.
Bill Janklow	Republican	January 3, 2003 – January 20, 2004	At-large	Elected in 2002. Resigned when convicted of vehicular manslaughter.
Dusty Johnson	Republican	January 3, 2019 – present	At-large	Elected in 2018. Re-elected in 2020. Re-elected in 2022. Re-elected in 2024.
Royal C. Johnson	Republican	March 4, 1915 – March 3, 1933	2nd	Elected in 1914. Re-elected in 1916. Re-elected in 1918. Re-elected in 1920. Re-elected in 1922. Re-elected in 1924. Re-elected in 1926. Re-elected in 1928. Re-elected in 1930. Lost re-election to Werner.
Tim Johnson	Democratic	January 3, 1987 – January 3, 1997	At-large	Elected in 1986. Re-elected in 1988. Re-elected in 1990. Re-elected in 1992. Re-elected in 1994. Retired to run for U.S. Senator.
John L. Jolley	Republican	December 7, 1891 – March 3, 1893	At-large	Elected to finish John Rankin Gamble's term. Retired.
John Edward Kelley	Populist	March 4, 1897 – March 3, 1899	At-large	Elected in 1896. Lost re-election to Burke.
Freeman T. Knowles	Populist	March 4, 1897 – March 3, 1899	At-large	Elected in 1896. Lost re-election to R.J. Gamble.
Harold O. Lovre	Republican	January 3, 1949 – January 3, 1957	1st	Elected in 1948. Re-elected in 1950. Re-elected in 1952. Re-elected in 1954. Lost re-election to McGovern.
William V. Lucas	Republican	March 4, 1893 – March 3, 1895	At-large	Elected in 1892. Lost renomination to R.J. Gamble.
Eben Martin	Republican	March 4, 1901 – March 3, 1907	At-large	Elected in 1900. Re-elected in 1902. Re-elected in 1904. Retired to run for U.S. Senator.
Eben Martin	Republican	June 26, 1908 – March 3, 1913	At-large	Elected to finish Parker's term. Re-elected in 1908. Re-elected in 1910. Redistricted to the 3rd district.
Eben Martin	Republican	March 4, 1913 – March 3, 1915	3rd	Redistricted from the at-large district and re-elected in 1912. Retired.
George McGovern	Democratic	January 3, 1957 – January 3, 1961	1st	Elected in 1956. Re-elected in 1958. Retired to run for U.S. senator.
Karl E. Mundt	Republican	January 3, 1939 – December 30, 1948	1st	Elected in 1938. Re-elected in 1940. Re-elected in 1942. Re-elected in 1944. Re-elected in 1946. Retired to run for U.S. senator and then resigned when appointed to the seat.
Kristi Noem	Republican	January 3, 2011 – January 3, 2019	At-large	Elected in 2010. Re-elected in 2012. Re-elected in 2014. Re-elected in 2016. Retired to run for Governor of South Dakota.
William H. Parker	Republican	March 4, 1907 – June 26, 1908	At-large	Elected in 1906. Died.
John Pickler	Republican	November 2, 1889 – March 3, 1897	At-large	Elected in 1889. Re-elected in 1890. Re-elected in 1892. Re-elected in 1894. Retired.
Larry Pressler	Republican	January 3, 1975 – January 3, 1979	1st	Elected in 1974. Re-elected in 1976. Retired to run for U.S. senator.
Ben Reifel	Republican	January 3, 1961 – January 3, 1971	1st	Elected in 1960. Re-elected in 1962. Re-elected in 1964. Re-elected in 1966. Re-elected in 1968. Retired.
Clint Roberts	Republican	January 3, 1981 – January 3, 1983	2nd	Elected in 1980. Redistricted to the at-large district and lost re-election to Daschle.
John Thune	Republican	January 3, 1997 – January 3, 2003	At-large	Elected in 1996. Re-elected in 1998. Re-elected in 2000. Retired to run for U.S. Senator.
Theodore B. Werner	Democratic	March 4, 1933 – January 3, 1937	2nd	Elected in 1932. Re-elected in 1934. Lost re-election to Case.
William Williamson	Republican	March 4, 1921 – March 3, 1933	3rd	Elected in 1920. Re-elected in 1922. Re-elected in 1924. Re-elected in 1926. Re-elected in 1928. Re-elected in 1930. Redistricted to the 2nd district and lost renomination to Johnson.

== See also ==
- List of United States senators from South Dakota
- South Dakota's congressional delegations
- South Dakota's congressional districts
