= 2024 South Dakota elections =

- November 5, 2024

The U.S. state of South Dakota held elections on November 5, 2024. Primary elections were held on June 4, 2024.

== Federal offices ==
=== President of the United States ===
Results of the 2024 United States presidential election in South Dakota by county: Trump 40–50% 50–60% 60–70% 70–80% 80–90% 90–100% / Harris 50–60% 60–70% 70–80% 80–90%

An election to determine the president of the United States was held in South Dakota. In the Democratic Party primary, Joe Biden won the state, receiving 74.6% of the vote and sending 16 delegates to the 2024 Democratic National Convention. On July 21, 2024, Biden withdrew from the election amid fallout from a widely-panned debate performance, and Kamala Harris replaced Biden as the Democratic nominee. In the Republican Party primary, Donald Trump ran without opposition. In the general election, Trump won South Dakota with 63.4% of the vote and received 3 electoral votes.

2024 South Dakota Democratic presidential primary
Candidate	Votes	%
Joe Biden	13,372	74.57%
Marianne Williamson	2,073	11.56%
Dean Phillips	1,723	9.61%
Armando Perez-Serrato	763	4.26%

2024 United States presidential election in South Dakota
Candidate	Running mate	Party	Popular vote		Electoral vote	
Candidate	Running mate	Party	Votes	%	Votes	%
Donald Trump	JD Vance	Republican	272,081	63.43	3	100.00
Kamala Harris	Tim Walz	Democratic	146,859	34.24	0	0.00
Robert F. Kennedy Jr.	Nicole Shanahan	Independent	7,204	1.68	0	0.00
Chase Oliver	Mike ter Maat	Libertarian	2,778	0.65	0	0.00
Total			428,922	100.00	3	100.00

=== United States House of Representatives ===
An election to determine the member of the United States House of Representatives for South Dakota's at-large congressional district was held. Both the Republican and Democratic nominees—incumbent Dusty Johnson and Sheryl Johnson, respectively—won their primaries uncontested. Dusty won the general election with 72% of the vote.

2024 South Dakota's at-large congressional district election
Party	Candidate	Votes	%
Republican	Dusty Johnson	303,630	72.04%
Democratic	Sheryl Johnson	117,818	27.96%
Total votes		421,448	100.00%

== Public Utilities Commission ==
An election to determine one of three members of the South Dakota Public Utilities Commission was held. The Republican Party nominated incumbent commissioner Kristie Fiegen. She was appointed in 2011 by Dennis Daugaard, the governor of South Dakota. In June 2024, the Democratic Party, at their state convention in Oacoma, nominated Forrest Wilson as their candidate. In July 2024, the Libertarian Party nominated businessman and volunteer emergency medical technician Gideon Oakes as their candidate. At the general election, Fiegen won re-election with 67.8% of the vote. Fiegen was sworn in on January 13, 2025.

2024 South Dakota Public Utilities Commission election
Party	Candidate	Votes	%
Republican	Kristie Fiegen	272,099	67.80%
Democratic	Forrest Wilson	108,029	26.92%
Libertarian	Gideon Oakes	21,176	5.28%
Total votes		401,304	100.00%

== State Senate ==
An election for all 35 seats of the South Dakota Senate was held. The Republican Party retained control of the Senate, taking 32 seats compared to the three seats won by the Democratic Party.

== State House ==
An election for all 70 seats of the South Dakota House of Representatives was held. The Republican Party retained control of the House, taking 64 seats compared to the six seats won by the Democratic Party.

== Supreme Court ==
A retention election for the South Dakota Supreme Court was held. Scott P. Myren, who was appointed by Governor Kristi Noem in 2021, retained his seat with 82% of the vote.

== Ballot measures ==
=== Amendment E ===
Amendment E was a proposed constitutional amendment which would have replaced masculine pronouns in the Constitution of South Dakota with gender-neutral pronouns. The amendment failed to pass, with 57.4% of votes being against it.

=== Amendment F ===
Amendment F was a proposed constitutional amendment which would have enforced worker requirements for specific individuals on Medicaid in the state. The amendment passed, with 56.1% of votes being in favor of it.

=== Amendment G ===
Amendment G was a proposed constitutional amendment which would have established a right to abortion in the Constitution of South Dakota. The amendment failed to pass, with 58.6% of votes being against it.

=== Amendment H ===
Amendment H was a proposed constitutional amendment instituted a nonpartisan primary for federal and state offices. The amendment failed to pass, with 65.6% of votes being against it.

=== Initiated Measure 28 ===
Measure 28 was a proposed law that would have eliminated taxes on any product sold for consumption, except for alcoholic beverages and prepared food. The measure failed to pass, with 69.2% of votes being against it.

==== Polling ====
Poll source	Date(s) administered	Sample size (Note: Key: A – all adults RV – registered voters LV – likely voters V – unclear)	Margin of error	Yes	No	Undecided
Emerson College/Nexstar Media	October 19–22, 2024	825 (LV)	± 3.3%	36%	48%	16%

=== Initiated Measure 29 ===
Measure 29 was a proposed law that would have legalized recreational marijuana. The measure failed to pass, with 55.5% of votes being against it.

==== Polling ====
Poll source	Date(s) administered	Sample size	Margin of error	Yes	No	Undecided
Emerson College/Nexstar Media	October 19–22, 2024	825 (LV)	± 3.3%	45%	50%	5%

=== Referred Law 21 ===
Referred Law 21 was a proposed act that would have allowed counties to impose a $1 per foot surcharge on carbon dioxide pipelines, for any fiscal year where its operator receives a tax credit, as well as establishing certain requirements for pipelines, including for minimum depth and leak or failure responsibility. The act failed to pass, with 59.4% of votes being against it.

== Notes and references ==
Notes
