= Neal Tapio =

American politician

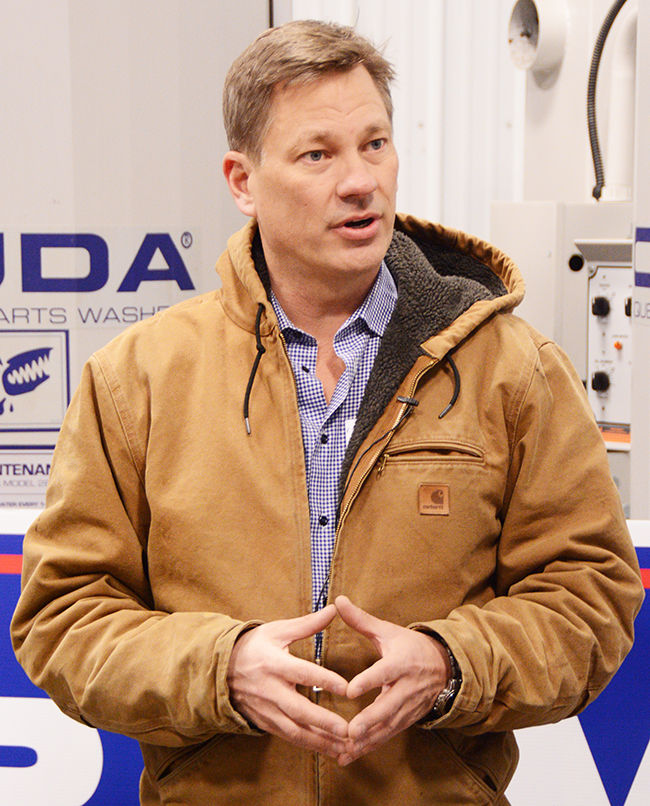
- Tapio in Watertown, South Dakota in 2018.

Member of the South Dakota Senate from the 5th district
- In office 2017–2019
- Preceded by: Ried Holien
- Succeeded by: Lee Schoenbeck

Personal details
- Born: September 19, 1970 (age 56) Watertown, South Dakota, U.S.
- Party: Republican
- Education: Moorhead State University
- Profession: Businessman; Entrepreneur
- Website: www.nealtapio.com

Neal Tapio (born September 19, 1970) is an American businessman, South Dakota state senator, and a former candidate for U.S. Representative for South Dakota's at-large congressional district. Tapio gained attention as an early supporter of Donald Trump and served as the Trump presidential campaign director for South Dakota.

== Early life and education ==
Neal Tapio was born in Watertown, South Dakota. Tapio graduated from Watertown High School in Watertown, South Dakota in 1988. Tapio attended Moorhead State University in Moorhead, Minnesota where he graduated in 1992 with a Bachelors in Business Administration. Tapio, directly out of college, worked as a staff assistant to then-U.S. Senator Larry Pressler in Washington, D.C. for two years.

== Business career ==
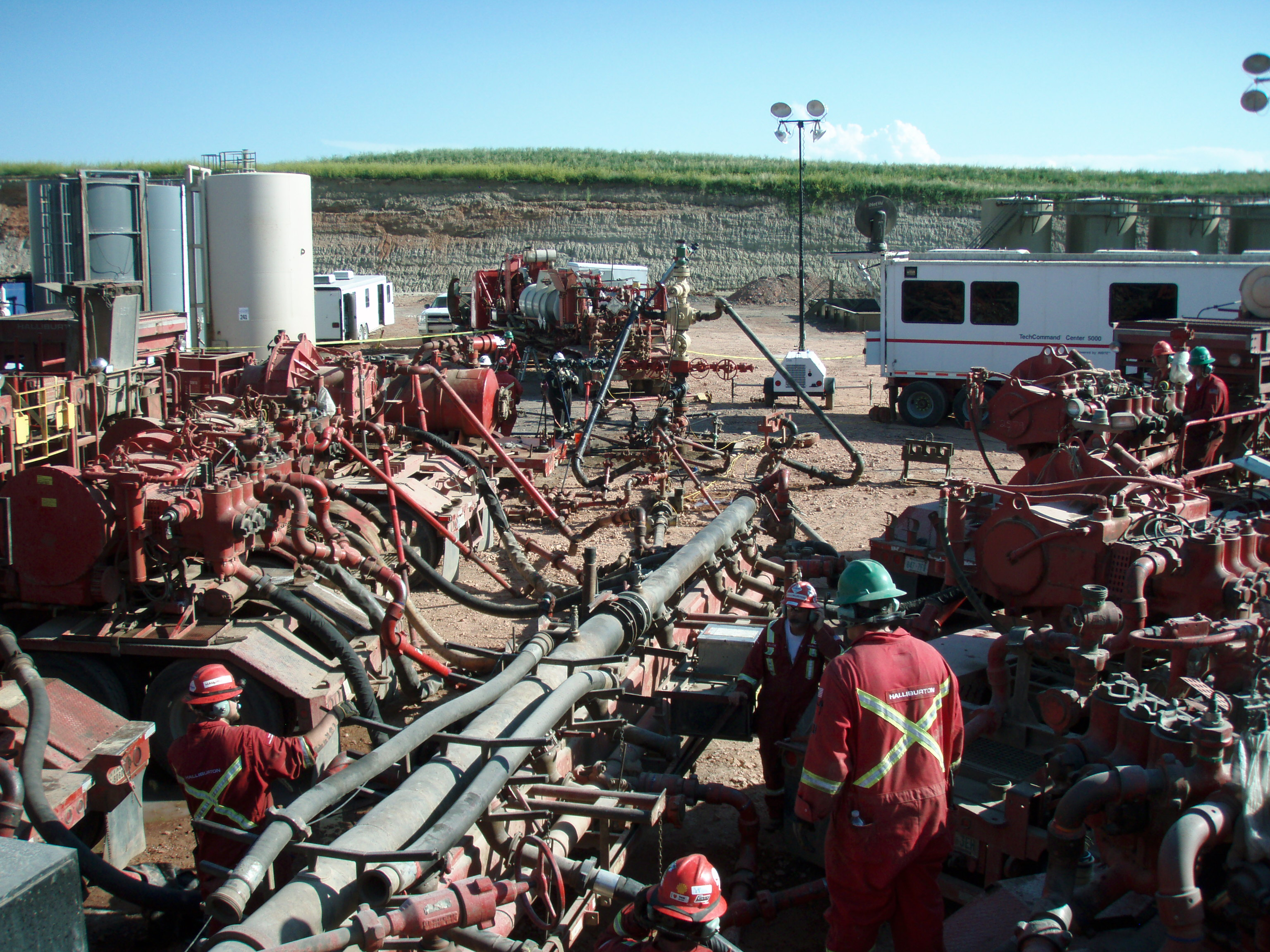
Drilling and fraccing equipment, which Tapio's machines were used on in the Bakken formation.

He worked in the finance industry for Wells Fargo in Rapid City, South Dakota. Tapio later founded New Horizon Homes in Sioux Falls, South Dakota. Before entering the petroleum industry, Tapio worked in the ethanol industry. He worked as a director of Growth Energy, an ethanol trade association. Tapio is the current CEO of NT Sales and Leasing in Watertown, South Dakota. Tapio's business has been heavily involved in the oil industry in the Bakken formation. During his time working in the oil fields, Tapio stated he worked 80 hours per week for 7 years having to resort to living in a tent due to housing shortages. Tapio also sells his machines to Fortune 50 companies.

== Political career ==
In 2002, Tapio was the campaign director for Larry Diedrich's congressional bid in the 2002 U.S. House of Representatives election. Tapio was an early supporter of then-presidential candidate Donald Trump in 2015. He served as Donald Trump's South Dakota campaign director for the 2016 U.S. presidential race.

In 2016, Tapio upset state representative Roger Solum in the South Dakota State Senate District 5 Republican primary. Tapio ran unopposed in the November 2016 general election. Tapio was sworn into the South Dakota Senate on January 10, 2017.

=== 2016 U.S. presidential election ===
Tapio successfully managed the South Dakota Trump campaign in the South Dakota primary and general elections. After securing the South Dakota primary, Tapio assisted the Trump Campaign in Northern Colorado for the general election. Tapio ultimately organized five rallies with Trump and two rallies with then-vice presidential nominee Mike Pence.

== 2018 U.S. House of Representatives election ==
=== Campaign ===
On January 28, 2018, Tapio announced his bid to become the Republican nominee for U.S. Representative for South Dakota's at-large congressional district. He faced former PUC commissioner Dusty Johnson and secretary of state Shantel Krebs in the June 5, 2018 GOP primary. Following the election, Tapio returned to the oil fields of the Bakken formation.

=== Issues ===
Tapio has stated he would declare a "state of emergency" over the Indian Reservations within South Dakota and would shift funding towards them in order to help alleviate various issues. As a state senator, Tapio received an “A” rating from the NRA Political Victory Fund and the National Association for Gun Rights.

== Electoral history ==
2018 Republican primary election – At Large Congressional District of South Dakota
| Party | Candidate | Votes | % |
|---|---|---|---|
| Republican | Dusty Johnson | 47,032 | 46.8 |
| Republican | Shantel Krebs | 29,442 | 29.2 |
| Republican | Neal Tapio | 23,980 | 24.0 |
| Total votes | | 100,454 | 100 |

== See also ==
- United States House of Representatives election in South Dakota, 2018
