= Ted Turner Campus =

Television studio complex and corporate office located in Atlanta, Georgia

- Former names: Turner Broadcasting Techwood Campus (1980–2019)

General information
- Type: Film and television production studio Corporate offices
- Location: 1050 Techwood Drive; Atlanta, Georgia, U.S. 30318
- Coordinates: 33°46′59.8728″N 84°23′38.5008″W
- Opening: 1980
- Owner: Turner Broadcasting System (1980–2019); WarnerMedia (2019–2022); Warner Bros. Discovery (2022–2026); Skydance (2026–present)

The Ted Turner Campus, formerly known as the Turner Broadcasting Techwood Campus and also referred to as the Techwood Campus, is a television production complex located in Atlanta, Georgia, next to the campus of the Georgia Institute of Technology. The complex houses production and broadcasting facilities, and serves as the corporate headquarters of TNT, TBS, CNN, TruTV, Turner Classic Movies, and The Cartoon Network, Inc. (Cartoon Network and Boomerang). It was also the headquarters for the Turner Broadcasting System along with serving as the headquarters for the sports division of TNT.

== History ==
=== Early history ===
The campus first started out as a club house for the Progressive Club, a Jewish social organization established in 1913. The organization would become one of the first Jewish organizations to openly express its heritage. The property sat idle after the organization left the building until it was bought by Ted Turner in 1979 for $4.2 million.

=== 1980s ===
On June 1, 1980, the complex became the headquarters for the newly launched 24-hour cable news network CNN which would go on the air at 6:00 p.m. Eastern Time with an introduction by Turner Broadcasting owner Ted Turner.

Around this time, the complex also became the home of television tapings for Georgia Championship Wrestling's (GCW), Jim Crockett Promotions, and World Championship Wrestling (WCW) from 1980 to 1989 which included Power Hour, World Championship Wrestling, Main Event, and Mid-Atlantic Championship Wrestling.

On July 14, 1984, Vince McMahon, owner of the World Wrestling Federation (WWF) took over the World Championship Wrestling program on Superstation WTBS. Unlike World Championship Wrestling, which had been taping its weekly show at the time from the complex, the WWF instead replaced the format with highlights from its syndicated shows as well as clips and matches from Madison Square Garden, Boston Garden, and other various arenas where the promotion promoted shows in. However, this was a direct violation of a promise that McMahon had made to provide original programming and tape programs at the Techwood studios. On March 2, 1985, the WWF began airing matches from the studio and changed the name of the program to WWF Georgia Championship Wrestling which was co-hosted by ring announcer Freddie Miller and Gorilla Monsoon. The program also featured interviews with various wrestlers who would be on the inaugural WrestleMania. The WWF would end up selling the timeslot to Jim Crockett Promotions for $1 million a few weeks after the first taping at the complex with the final WWF Georgia Championship Wrestling episode airing on March 30, 1985. The first episode of JCP's World Championship Wrestling aired on April 6, 1985, with matches that were taped on March 30, 1985, under the branding of NWA World Championship Wrestling. Tapings continued to be held at the WTBS studios until March 16, 1989, when WCW relocated their tapings to Center Stage Theater on March 29, 1989.

In 1987, CNN relocated from the campus to the CNN Center following a two-year renovation after Ted Turner had purchased the building in 1985.

The complex was also where Inside the NBA on TNT would be broadcast from 1989 to 2025. The program is still broadcast from the complex under a sublicensing agreement with ESPN.

=== 2010s ===
On December 2, 2019, the Techwood campus was renamed to the Ted Turner Campus and was dedicated to Ted Turner. Several WarnerMedia executives along with Ted Turner, CNN anchor Wolf Blitzer, CNN president Jeff Zucker, former Turner Broadcasting CEO Phil Kent, Headline News host Lynne Russell, CNN correspondent Chuck de Caro, and former People Now host Bill Tush were on hand for the dedication ceremony. In addition to the renaming, a mural featuring Ted Turner was also presented.

=== 2020s ===
On June 29, 2020, WarnerMedia (later Warner Bros. Discovery) announced their plans to sell the CNN Center and continue to lease space in the building until expansion of the Techwood campus to accommodate CNN's operations were complete. On October 30, 2023, CNN gradually began move operations to the Ted Turner Campus including control room facilities and various shows. Several weekend shows continued to be based at the CNN Center until February 25, 2024, when the remainder of CNN's operations were relocated to the Ted Turner Campus.

On June 27, 2024, the Ted Turner Campus hosted Georgia's first United States presidential debate. The debate featured no audience and was the first debate of the 2024 United States presidential election between former President of the United States, Donald Trump and sitting-at-the-time President of the United States Joe Biden and was moderated by CNN anchors Jake Tapper and Dana Bash.
