= James A. Burg =

American politician (1941–2024)

Member of the South Dakota House of Representatives
- In office January 1975 – January 1985

Member of the South Dakota Senate
- In office January 1985 – January 1987

Commissioner of the South Dakota Public Utilities Commission
- In office January 1987 – January 2005
- Preceded by: Jeff Solem
- Succeeded by: Dusty Johnson

Personal details
- Born: April 22, 1941
- Died: April 16, 2024 (aged 82)
- Party: Democratic

James A. Burg (April 22, 1941 – April 16, 2024) was an American politician. He served as a Democratic member of the South Dakota House of Representatives, South Dakota Senate, and the South Dakota Public Utilities Commission.

Burg died on April 16, 2024, at the age of 82.
