= 2022 South Dakota elections =

Election

- November 8, 2022

South Dakota state elections in 2022 were held on Tuesday, November 8, 2022. Primary elections were held on June 7, 2022 (with runoffs on August 16, 2022).

All of South Dakota's executive officers were up for election, as well as South Dakota's at-large seat in the United States House of Representatives.

== Federal ==
=== United States Senate ===
Incumbent three-term Republican U.S. Senator John Thune, who is the Senate Minority Whip, won the Republican primary against Bruce Whalen and Mark Mowry. Thune was reelected to a fourth term, defeating Democrat Brian Bengs.

=== United States House of Representatives ===
Incumbent Republican U.S. Representative Dusty Johnson won the Republican primary against Taffy Howard. No Democrats filed to run, and Johnson defeated his only challenger, a Libertarian.

== Statewide ==
=== Governor and lieutenant governor ===
Incumbent Republican governor Kristi Noem defeated Democratic nominee Representative Jamie Smith to win reelection.

=== Attorney general ===
Incumbent Republican attorney general Jason Ravnsborg did not seek reelection.

=== Secretary of state ===
Incumbent Republican secretary of state Steve Barnett lost re-nomination at the Republican convention to Monae Johnson, who also won the general election.

=== State treasurer ===
Incumbent Republican state treasurer Josh Haeder won re-election.

=== State auditor ===
Incumbent Republican state auditor Rich Sattgast won re-election.

=== Commissioner of school and public lands ===
Incumbent Republican Commissioner of School and Public Lands Jarrod Johnson, who was appointed to the position following the resignation of Ryan Brunner, did not seek election to a full term in office. Republican state Senator Brock Greenfield defeated Democrat Timothy Azure to succeed Johnson.

=== Public Utilities Commission ===
Incumbent Republican Public Utilities Commissioner Chris Nelson won re-election.

== Ballot measures ==
=== Constitutional Amendment C ===
Constitutional Amendment C
- 60% Vote Requirement for Ballot Measures Increasing Taxes or Appropriating $10 Million Amendment

Results
Choice	Votes	%
Yes	59,111	32.57%
No	122,387	67.43%
Total votes	181,498	100.00%
County results
Yes
50–60%
No
70–80%
60–70%
50–60%

2022 South Dakota Amendment C was on the June 7 primary ballot. The amendment intended to require future ballot measures that would cost more than ten million dollars to receive 60% of the vote to be approved, instead of a simple majority. It was rejected by a significant margin.

==== Results ====
Amendment C
Choice	Votes	%
For	59,111	32.57
Against	122,387	67.43
Total	181,498	100.00

=== Constitutional Amendment D ===
Constitutional Amendment D
- An initiated amendment to the South Dakota Constitution expanding Medicaid eligibility

Results
Choice	Votes	%
Yes	192,057	56.21%
No	149,616	43.79%
Total votes	341,673	100.00%
County results
Yes
80–90%
70–80%
60–70%
50–60%
No
60–70%
50–60%

2022 South Dakota Amendment D was a citizen-initiated state constitutional amendment on the November 8 general election ballot. The amendment intended to expand Medicaid eligibility. The amendment passed with around 56% of the vote.

==== Results ====
Amendment D
Choice	Votes	%
For	192,057	56.21
Against	149,616	43.79
Total	341,673	100.00
