= 2024 United States House of Representatives election in South Dakota =

2024 United States House of Representatives election in South Dakota's at-large district
- November 5, 2024
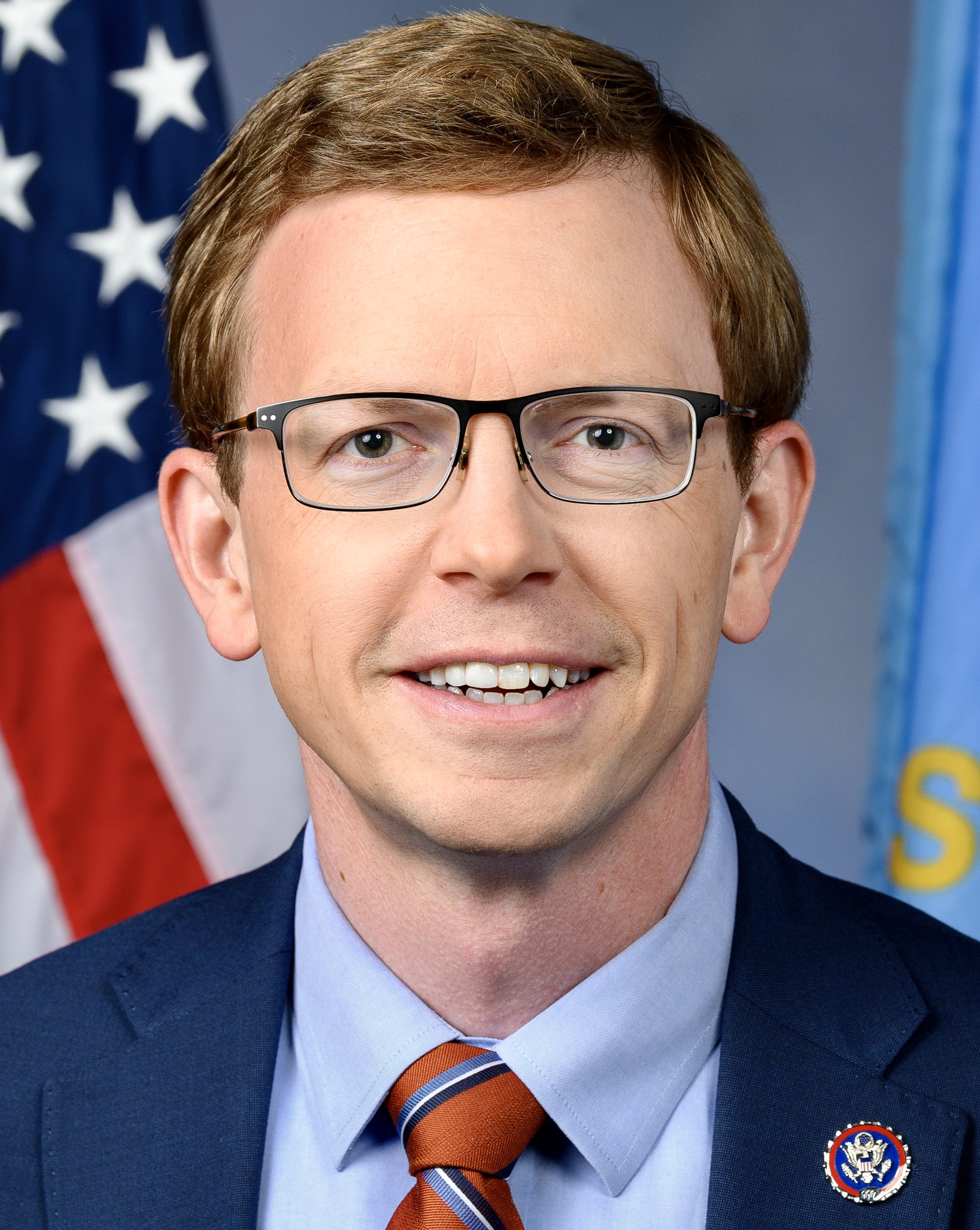

Nominee	Dusty Johnson	Sheryl Johnson
Party	Republican	Democratic
Popular vote	303,630	117,818
Percentage	72.04%	27.96%
- County results D. Johnson: 50–60% 60–70% 70–80% 80–90% >90% S. Johnson: 50–60% 60–70% 70–80%
U.S. Representative before election
Dusty Johnson
Republican
Elected U.S. Representative
Dusty Johnson
Republican

The 2024 United States House of Representatives election in South Dakota were held on November 5, 2024, to elect a member of the United States House of Representatives to represent the state of South Dakota from its at-large congressional district. The election coincided with the 2024 U.S. presidential election, as well as other elections to the U.S. House, elections to the United States Senate, and various other state and local elections. The primary elections were held on June 4, 2024.

Incumbent Republican representative Dusty Johnson was re-elected with 77.4% of the vote in 2022 against Collin Duprel, a Libertarian Party candidate.

This congressional house race was the first in the state since 2018 to have a Democrat on the ballot, as 2020 and 2022 only had a Libertarian candidate opposing Dusty Johnson.

== Republican primary ==
=== Candidates ===
==== Nominee ====
- Dusty Johnson, incumbent U.S. representative

==== Endorsements ====
Dusty Johnson

Organizations

- AIPAC
- National Right to Life Committee

==== Fundraising ====
Campaign finance reports as of May 15, 2024
Candidate	Raised	Spent	Cash on hand
Dusty Johnson (R)	$2,969,253	$776,781	$4,514,686
Source: Federal Election Commission

== Democratic primary ==
=== Candidates ===
==== Nominee ====
- Sheryl Johnson, retired education assistant

==== Fundraising ====
Campaign finance reports as of May 15, 2024
Candidate	Raised	Spent	Cash on hand
Sheryl Johnson (D)	$52,830	$22,213	$30,617
Source: Federal Election Commission

== General election ==
=== Predictions ===
Source	Ranking	As of
The Cook Political Report	Solid R	December 12, 2023
Inside Elections	Solid R	December 15, 2023
Sabato's Crystal Ball	Safe R	June 8, 2023
Elections Daily	Safe R	June 8, 2023
CNalysis	Solid R	November 16, 2023
Decision Desk HQ	Solid R	June 1, 2024

=== Polling ===
Poll source	Date(s) administered	Sample size (Note: Key: A – all adults RV – registered voters LV – likely voters V – unclear)	Margin of error	Dusty Johnson (R)	Sheryl Johnson (D)	Undecided
Emerson College (Note: Poll sponsored by The Hill and KELO-TV)	October 19–22, 2024	825 (LV)	± 3.3%	64%	28%	9%
Mason-Dixon Polling & Strategy (Note: Poll sponsored by South Dakota News Watch and University of South Dakota)	October 12–16, 2024	500 (RV)	± 4.5%	61%	24%	15%

=== Results ===
2024 South Dakota's at-large congressional district election
Party	Candidate	Votes	%
Republican	Dusty Johnson (incumbent)	303,630	72.04%
Democratic	Sheryl Johnson	117,818	27.96%
Total votes		421,448	100.00%
Republican hold			

==== By county ====
County	Dusty Johnson Republican		Sheryl Johnson Democratic		Margin		Total
County	#	%	#	%	#	%	Total
Aurora	1,146	83.77%	222	16.23%	924	67.54%	1,368
Beadle	5,505	78.98%	1,465	21.02%	4,040	57.96%	6,970
Bennett	730	68.61%	334	31.39%	396	37.22%	1,064
Bon Homme	2,373	80.80%	564	19.20%	1,809	61.59%	2,937
Brookings	10,133	68.57%	4,644	31.43%	5,489	37.15%	14,777
Brown	11,974	71.58%	4,753	28.42%	7,221	43.17%	16,727
Brule	1,881	78.15%	526	21.85%	1,355	56.29%	2,407
Buffalo	217	47.48%	240	52.52%	-23	-5.03%	457
Butte	4,066	82.91%	838	17.09%	3,228	65.82%	4,904
Campbell	704	87.02%	105	12.98%	599	74.04%	809
Charles Mix	2,738	75.97%	866	24.03%	1,872	51.94%	3,604
Clark	1,513	83.27%	304	16.73%	1,209	66.54%	1,817
Clay	3,209	57.51%	2,371	42.49%	838	15.02%	5,580
Codington	10,406	78.32%	2,880	21.68%	7,526	56.65%	13,286
Corson	665	59.27%	457	40.73%	208	18.54%	1,122
Custer	4,536	77.27%	1,334	22.73%	3,202	54.55%	5,870
Davison	7,131	78.67%	1,934	21.33%	5,197	57.33%	9,065
Day	2,118	72.91%	787	27.09%	1,331	45.82%	2,905
Deuel	1,856	82.12%	404	17.88%	1,452	64.25%	2,260
Dewey	944	51.36%	894	48.64%	50	2.72%	1,838
Douglas	1,462	90.30%	157	9.70%	1,305	80.61%	1,619
Edmunds	1,701	84.92%	302	15.08%	1,399	69.85%	2,003
Fall River	3,272	78.63%	889	21.37%	2,383	57.27%	4,161
Faulk	928	84.67%	168	15.33%	760	69.34%	1,096
Grant	2,876	80.31%	705	19.69%	2,171	60.63%	3,581
Gregory	1,880	84.68%	340	15.32%	1,540	69.37%	2,220
Haakon	991	89.85%	112	10.15%	879	79.69%	1,103
Hamlin	2,730	86.28%	434	13.72%	2,296	72.57%	3,164
Hand	1,470	84.53%	269	15.47%	1,201	69.06%	1,739
Hanson	1,665	82.51%	353	17.49%	1,312	65.01%	2,018
Harding	752	94.35%	45	5.65%	707	88.71%	797
Hughes	6,342	75.85%	2,019	24.15%	4,323	51.70%	8,361
Hutchinson	3,166	85.57%	534	14.43%	2,632	71.14%	3,700
Hyde	580	84.92%	103	15.08%	477	69.84%	683
Jackson	783	70.41%	329	29.59%	454	40.83%	1,112
Jerauld	816	81.60%	184	18.40%	632	63.20%	1,000
Jones	477	88.50%	62	11.50%	415	76.99%	539
Kingsbury	2,209	79.46%	571	20.54%	1,638	58.92%	2,780
Lake	4,406	75.16%	1,456	24.84%	2,950	50.32%	5,862
Lawrence	10,757	71.50%	4,288	28.50%	6,469	43.00%	15,045
Lincoln	25,901	72.24%	9,954	27.76%	15,947	44.48%	35,855
Lyman	1,099	77.56%	318	22.44%	781	55.12%	1,417
Marshall	1,489	70.97%	609	29.03%	880	41.94%	2,098
McCook	2,460	81.62%	554	18.38%	1,906	63.24%	3,014
McPherson	1,077	87.07%	160	12.93%	917	74.13%	1,237
Meade	11,439	80.03%	2,855	19.97%	8,584	60.05%	14,294
Mellette	370	59.39%	253	40.61%	117	18.78%	623
Miner	934	81.71%	209	18.29%	725	63.43%	1,143
Minnehaha	60,016	65.01%	32,303	34.99%	27,713	30.02%	92,319
Moody	2,268	71.84%	889	28.16%	1,379	43.68%	3,157
Oglala Lakota	720	23.74%	2,313	76.26%	-1,593	-52.52%	3,033
Pennington	38,628	69.78%	16,727	30.22%	21,901	39.56%	55,355
Perkins	1,395	88.46%	182	11.54%	1,213	76.92%	1,577
Potter	1,109	86.51%	173	13.49%	936	73.01%	1,282
Roberts	2,827	68.97%	1,272	31.03%	1,555	37.94%	4,099
Sanborn	1,023	84.48%	188	15.52%	835	68.95%	1,211
Spink	2,430	78.01%	685	21.99%	1,745	56.02%	3,115
Stanley	1,355	80.18%	335	19.82%	1,020	60.36%	1,690
Sully	719	83.03%	147	16.97%	572	66.05%	866
Todd	690	32.90%	1,407	67.10%	-717	-34.19%	2,097
Tripp	2,232	85.48%	379	14.52%	1,853	70.97%	2,611
Turner	3,688	81.94%	813	18.06%	2,875	63.87%	4,501
Union	6,650	76.38%	2,057	23.62%	4,593	52.75%	8,707
Walworth	2,005	83.33%	401	16.67%	1,604	66.67%	2,406
Yankton	7,564	71.29%	3,046	28.71%	4,518	42.58%	10,610
Ziebach	434	55.57%	347	44.43%	87	11.14%	781
Totals	303,630	72.04%	117,818	27.96%	185,812	44.09%	421,448

==== Counties that flipped from Libertarian to Democratic ====
- Oglala Lakota (largest city: Pine Ridge)
- Todd (largest city: Mission)

==== Counties that flipped from Republican to Democratic ====
- Buffalo (largest city: Fort Thompson)

County Flips: Democratic Flip / Republican Hold
