= 2010 South Dakota elections =

- November 2, 2010

Elections were held in South Dakota on November 2, 2010. Primary elections took place on June 8, 2010, for the Democratic Party, Republican Party, and Constitution Party.

== Federal ==
=== United States Senate ===
Republican incumbent John Thune ran for re-election.

=== United States House ===
Democratic incumbent Stephanie Herseth Sandlin ran for re-election.

== State ==
=== Governor ===
Mike Rounds, the Republican Governor, was term-limited and did not seek re-election in 2010. Five candidates ran for the Republican nomination. The winner of the Republican primary faced Democratic State Senator Scott Heidepriem in the general election.

=== Other Statewide Officers ===
The offices of Lieutenant Governor, Secretary of State, 2010 South Dakota Attorney General election, Treasurer, Auditor, Commissioner of School and Public Lands, and Public Utility Commissioner were all up for election in 2010. Candidates for each party were nominated at the 2010 state conventions of each political party.

Secretary of state results by county Gant: 40–50%; 50–60%; 60–70%; 70–80%; Nesselhuf: 40–50%; 50–60%; 60–70%; 70–80%; 80–90%

Attorney general results by county Jackley: 50–60%; 60–70%; 70–80%; 80–90%; Volesky: 50–60%; 60–70%; 70–80%; 80–90%

State treasurer results by county Sattgast: 50–60%; 60–70%; 70–80%; 80–90%; Katus: 50–60%; 60–70%; 70–80%; 80–90%

State auditor results by county Brunner: 40–50%; 50–60%; 60–70%; 70–80%; 80–90%; 90–100%; English: 40–50%; 50–60%; 60–70%; 70–80%; 80–90%

Commissioner of School and Public Lands results by county Johnson: 50–60%; 60–70%; 70–80%; 80–90%; Pille: 50–60%; 60–70%; 70–80%; 80–90%

Public Utility Commissioner results by county Johnson: 50–60%; 60–70%; 70–80%; 80–90%; Karpen: 50–60%; 60–70%; 80–90%

=== State Senate ===
All thirty-five seats of the South Dakota Senate were up for election in 2010.

=== State House of Representatives ===
All seventy seats in the South Dakota House of Representatives were up for election in 2010.

=== Judicial positions ===
Multiple judicial positions were up for election in 2010.

- South Dakota judicial elections, 2010 at Judgepedia

=== Ballot measures ===
Four measures were certified for the November 2 ballot:
1. Protects the right to secret ballots in federal, state, and union representation elections
2. Repeals the automatic annual transfer of $12 million from the trust fund to the state general fund
3. Extends smoking ban to apply statewide
4. Proposes legalization of medical marijuana

- South Dakota 2010 ballot measures at Ballotpedia

Amendment K Results by county Yes: 80–90%; 70–80%

Amendment L Results by county No: 70–80%; 60–70%; 50–60%; Yes: 50–60%

Referred Law 12 Results by county Yes: 70–80%; 60–70%; 50–60%; No: 50–60%

Initiated Measure 13 Results by county No: 80–90%; 70–80%; 60–70%; 50–60%; Yes: 60–70%; 50–60%

== Local ==
=== County officers ===
County offices including County Commissioners, County Auditors, County Registers of Deeds, and County Sheriffs were up for election in 2010.

=== Party representatives ===
In its closed primary election on June 8, party members elected delegates to the Republican Party State Convention and the Democratic Party State Convention.
