= 2020 United States House of Representatives election in South Dakota =

2020 United States House of Representatives election in South Dakota's at-large district
- November 3, 2020
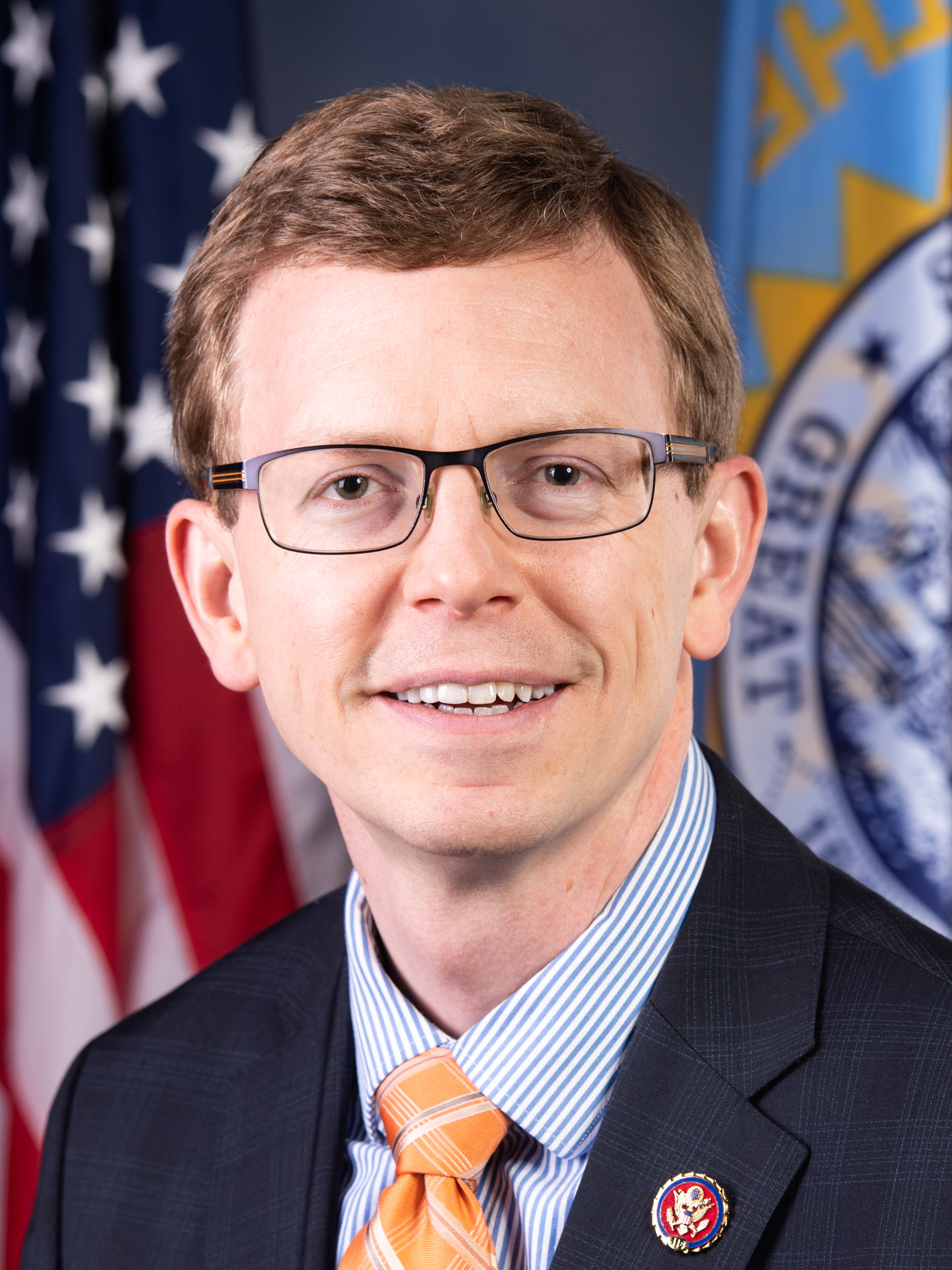

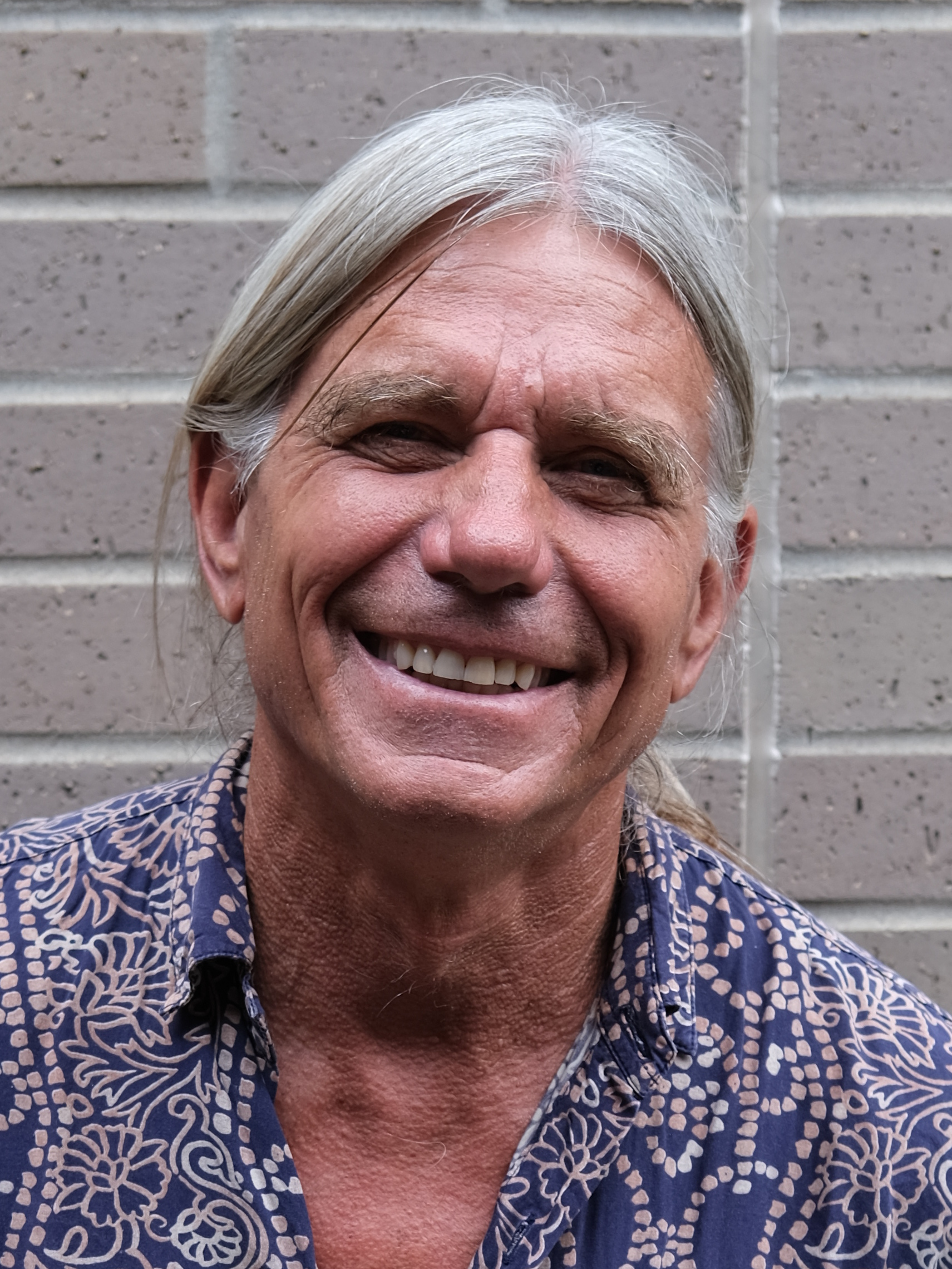
Nominee	Dusty Johnson	Randy Luallin
Party	Republican	Libertarian
Popular vote	321,984	75,748
Percentage	80.96%	19.04%
- Johnson: 50–60% 60–70% 70–80% 80–90% >90% Luallin: 50–60% 60–70% 70–80%
U.S. Representative before election
Dusty Johnson
Republican
Elected U.S. Representative
Dusty Johnson
Republican

The 2020 United States House of Representatives election in South Dakota was held on November 3, 2020, to elect the U.S. representative from South Dakota's at-large congressional district. The election coincided with the 2020 U.S. presidential election, as well as other elections to the House of Representatives, elections to the United States Senate and various state and local elections.

Incumbent Republican Dusty Johnson was elected with 60.3% of the vote in 2018.

== Republican primary ==
=== Candidates ===
==== Declared ====
- Dusty Johnson, incumbent U.S. representative
- Liz Marty May, state representative

=== Primary results ===
Results by county Johnson: 50–60%; 60–70%; 70–80%; 80–90%; May: 50–60%; 60–70%; 70–80%

Republican primary results
Party	Candidate	Votes	%
Republican	Dusty Johnson (incumbent)	71,496	76.65%
Republican	Liz Marty May	21,779	23.35%
Total votes		93,275	100.0%

== Democratic primary ==
No candidate was able to gather enough signatures to qualify for the Democratic primary. According to state party chairman Randy Seiler, Democratic canvassing efforts were hampered by the coronavirus outbreak.

=== Candidates ===
==== Failed to qualify ====
- Whitney Raver, small business owner
- Brian Worth, financial crime specialist

==== Withdrawn ====
- Ellee Spawn, resource coordinator

=== Endorsements ===
Whitney Raver

Organizations

- National Women's Political Caucus

== Libertarian convention ==
=== Candidates ===
==== Declared ====
- Randy Luallin, nominee for Colorado's 2nd congressional district in 2012

== General election ==
=== Predictions ===
Source	Ranking	As of
The Cook Political Report	Safe R	November 2, 2020
Inside Elections	Safe R	October 28, 2020
Sabato's Crystal Ball	Safe R	November 2, 2020
Politico	Safe R	November 2, 2020
Daily Kos	Safe R	November 2, 2020
RCP	Safe R	November 2, 2020

=== Results ===
2020 South Dakota's at-large congressional district election
Party	Candidate	Votes	%
Republican	Dusty Johnson (incumbent)	321,984	80.96%
Libertarian	Randy Luallin	75,748	19.04%
Total votes		397,732	100.00%
Republican hold			

==== By county ====
County	Dusty Johnson Republican		Randy Luallin Libertarian		Margin		Total
County	#	%	#	%	#	%	Total
Aurora	1,224	89.47%	144	10.53%	1,080	78.95%	1,368
Beadle	5,857	86.22%	936	13.78%	4,921	72.44%	6,793
Bennett	807	73.70%	288	26.30%	519	47.40%	1,095
Bon Homme	2,519	86.62%	389	13.38%	2,130	73.25%	2,908
Brookings	10,741	79.37%	2,791	20.63%	7,950	58.75%	13,532
Brown	13,706	82.83%	2,841	17.17%	10,865	65.66%	16,547
Brule	2,073	85.98%	338	14.02%	1,735	71.96%	2,411
Buffalo	306	60.96%	196	39.04%	110	21.91%	502
Butte	3,977	85.55%	672	14.45%	3,305	71.09%	4,649
Campbell	790	92.51%	64	7.49%	726	85.01%	854
Charles Mix	2,921	80.60%	703	19.40%	2,218	61.20%	3,624
Clark	1,571	87.62%	222	12.38%	1,349	75.24%	1,793
Clay	3,750	73.13%	1,378	26.87%	2,372	46.26%	5,128
Codington	10,685	85.03%	1,881	14.97%	8,804	70.06%	12,566
Corson	755	67.41%	365	32.59%	390	34.82%	1,120
Custer	4,336	82.78%	902	17.22%	3,434	65.56%	5,238
Davison	7,101	86.92%	1,069	13.08%	6,032	73.83%	8,170
Day	2,336	82.81%	485	17.19%	1,851	65.62%	2,821
Deuel	2,005	87.21%	294	12.79%	1,711	74.42%	2,299
Dewey	1,065	60.58%	693	39.42%	372	21.16%	1,758
Douglas	1,568	93.67%	106	6.33%	1,462	87.34%	1,674
Edmunds	1,741	90.44%	184	9.56%	1,557	80.88%	1,925
Fall River	3,142	81.04%	735	18.96%	2,407	62.08%	3,877
Faulk	1,065	92.21%	90	7.79%	975	84.42%	1,155
Grant	3,164	87.26%	462	12.74%	2,702	74.52%	3,626
Gregory	2,009	91.82%	179	8.18%	1,830	83.64%	2,188
Haakon	1,061	94.73%	59	5.27%	1,002	89.46%	1,120
Hamlin	2,644	88.05%	359	11.95%	2,285	76.09%	3,003
Hand	1,647	91.20%	159	8.80%	1,488	82.39%	1,806
Hanson	1,938	87.57%	275	12.43%	1,663	75.15%	2,213
Harding	747	93.96%	48	6.04%	699	87.92%	795
Hughes	7,148	84.85%	1,276	15.15%	5,872	69.71%	8,424
Hutchinson	3,301	90.39%	351	9.61%	2,950	80.78%	3,652
Hyde	628	90.23%	68	9.77%	560	80.46%	696
Jackson	809	76.18%	253	23.82%	556	52.35%	1,062
Jerauld	847	88.05%	115	11.95%	732	76.09%	962
Jones	528	89.04%	65	10.96%	463	78.08%	593
Kingsbury	2,314	86.50%	361	13.50%	1,953	73.01%	2,675
Lake	4,717	84.98%	834	15.02%	3,883	69.95%	5,551
Lawrence	10,481	80.61%	2,521	19.39%	7,960	61.22%	13,002
Lincoln	25,298	82.71%	5,290	17.29%	20,008	65.41%	30,588
Lyman	1,228	79.74%	312	20.26%	916	59.48%	1,540
Marshall	1,670	82.10%	364	17.90%	1,306	64.21%	2,034
McCook	2,479	87.04%	369	12.96%	2,110	74.09%	2,848
McPherson	1,181	91.20%	114	8.80%	1,067	82.39%	1,295
Meade	10,983	83.45%	2,178	16.55%	8,805	66.90%	13,161
Mellette	548	73.46%	198	26.54%	350	46.92%	746
Miner	964	87.88%	133	12.12%	831	75.75%	1,097
Minnehaha	65,473	76.96%	19,600	23.04%	45,873	53.92%	85,073
Moody	2,425	79.35%	631	20.65%	1,794	58.70%	3,056
Oglala Lakota	855	31.43%	1,865	68.57%	-1,010	-37.13%	2,720
Pennington	41,982	78.24%	11,679	21.76%	30,303	56.47%	53,661
Perkins	1,427	89.02%	176	10.98%	1,251	78.04%	1,603
Potter	1,255	92.48%	102	7.52%	1,153	84.97%	1,357
Roberts	3,100	76.85%	934	23.15%	2,166	53.69%	4,034
Sanborn	1,016	88.73%	129	11.27%	887	77.47%	1,145
Spink	2,645	86.86%	400	13.14%	2,245	73.73%	3,045
Stanley	1,399	88.60%	180	11.40%	1,219	77.20%	1,579
Sully	807	89.77%	92	10.23%	715	79.53%	899
Todd	961	43.52%	1,247	56.48%	-286	-12.95%	2,208
Tripp	2,360	89.84%	267	10.16%	2,093	79.67%	2,627
Turner	3,885	87.78%	541	12.22%	3,344	75.55%	4,426
Union	6,862	83.61%	1,345	16.39%	5,517	67.22%	8,207
Walworth	2,222	89.27%	267	10.73%	1,955	78.55%	2,489
Yankton	8,404	81.66%	1,887	18.34%	6,517	63.33%	10,291
Ziebach	531	64.13%	297	35.87%	234	28.26%	828
Totals	321,984	80.96%	75,748	19.04%	246,236	61.91%	397,732

==== Counties that flipped from Democratic to Libertarian ====
- Oglala Lakota (largest city: Pine Ridge)
- Todd (largest city: Mission)

==== Counties that flipped from Democratic to Republican ====
- Ziebach (largest city: Dupree)
- Corson (largest city: McLaughlin)
- Clay (largest city: Vermillion)
- Dewey (largest city: North Eagle Butte)
- Buffalo (largest city: Fort Thompson)

County flips: Libertarian Flip / Republican Hold Flip
