= 2018 United States House of Representatives election in South Dakota =

2018 United States House of Representatives election in South Dakota's at-large district
- November 6, 2018
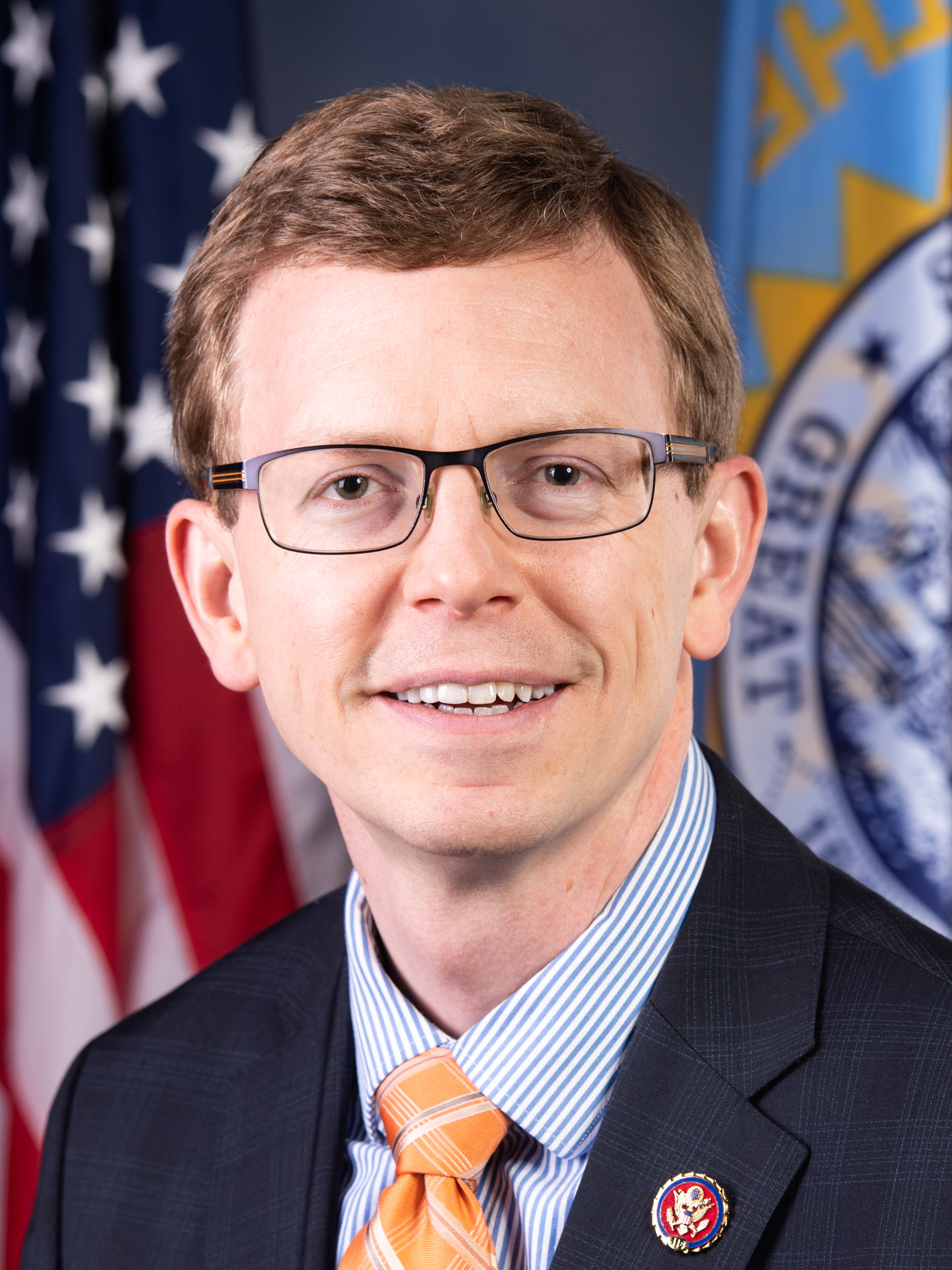

Nominee	Dusty Johnson	Tim Bjorkman
Party	Republican	Democratic
Popular vote	202,695	121,033
Percentage	60.33%	36.03%
- Johnson: 40–50% 50–60% 60–70% 70–80% 80–90% >90% Bjorkman: 40–50% 50–60% 60–70% 70–80% 80–90% Tie: 40–50%
U.S. Representative before election
Kristi Noem
Republican
Elected U.S. Representative
Dusty Johnson
Republican

The 2018 United States House of Representatives election in South Dakota was held on November 6, to elect the U.S. representative for South Dakota's at-large congressional district. The election coincided with other statewide, legislative, and local elections.

Incumbent Republican U.S. Representative Kristi Noem did not run for a fifth term and instead ran successfully for governor of South Dakota. This was the first open seat election since 2004, and the first time a male candidate was elected since 2002. This was the last U.S. House election in South Dakota until 2024 that a Democrat appeared on the November ballot.

== Republican primary ==
=== Candidates ===
==== Declared ====
- Dusty Johnson, former chairman of the South Dakota Public Utilities Commission and former chief of staff to Governor Dennis Daugaard
- Shantel Krebs, Secretary of State of South Dakota
- Neal Tapio, state senator, businessman and former Trump campaign director for South Dakota

==== Declined ====
- Kristi Noem, incumbent U.S. representative (running for governor)
- Eric Terrell

=== Polling ===
Poll source	Date(s) administered	Sample size	Margin of error	Dusty Johnson	Shantel Krebs	Neal Tapio	Undecided
Mason-Dixon	May 21–23, 2018	625	± 4.5%	41%	23%	13%	23%

=== Primary results ===
Results by county: Johnson: 30–40%; 40–50%; 50–60%; 60–70%; Krebs: 30–40%; 40–50%; Tapio: 30–40%; 40–50%

Republican primary results
Party	Candidate	Votes	%
Republican	Dusty Johnson	47,032	46.8
Republican	Shantel Krebs	29,442	29.3
Republican	Neal Tapio	23,980	24.0
Total votes		100,454	100

== Democratic primary ==
=== Candidates ===
==== Declared ====
- Tim Bjorkman, former circuit court judge

==== Failed to file ====
- Chris Martian, former IT professional

==== Declined ====
- Shawn Bordeaux, state representative
- Troy Heinert, state senator
- Mike Huether, mayor of Sioux Falls (switched to Independent)
- Brendan Johnson, former United States Attorney for the District of South Dakota
- J.R. LaPlante, former South Dakota Secretary of Tribal Relations and State House candidate in 2016
- Stephanie Herseth Sandlin, former U.S. representative
- Billie Sutton, Minority Leader of the South Dakota Senate (running for governor)

== Libertarian nomination ==
=== Candidates ===
==== Declared ====
- George Hendrickson, former police officer

== Independents ==
=== Candidates ===
==== Declined ====
- Mike Huether, mayor of Sioux Falls

== General election ==
=== Predictions ===
Source	Ranking	As of
The Cook Political Report	Solid R	June 1, 2018
The Rothenberg Political Report	Solid R	June 1, 2018
Sabato's Crystal Ball	Safe R	June 6, 2018

=== Polling ===
Poll source	Date(s) administered	Sample size	Margin of error	Dusty Johnson (R)	Tim Bjorkman (D)	Other	Undecided
Change Research (D)	November 2–4, 2018	851	–	51%	41%	5%	–
Emerson College	November 1–4, 2018	514	± 4.5%	54%	38%	–	5%
Mason-Dixon	October 18–22, 2018	500	± 4.5%	54%	31%	3%	12%
Public Opinion Strategies (R-Johnson)	August 1–3 & 5, 2018	400	± 4.9%	54%	33%	–	10%
Public Policy Polling (D-Bjorkman)	July 19–20, 2018	641	± 3.9%	43%	33%	–	14%

=== Results ===
2018 South Dakota's at-large congressional district election
Party	Candidate	Votes	%	±%
Republican	Dusty Johnson	202,695	60.33%	−3.77%
Democratic	Tim Bjorkman	121,033	36.03%	+0.13%
Independent	Ron Wieczorek	7,323	2.18%	N/A
Libertarian	George D. Hendrickson	4,914	1.46%	N/A
Total votes		335,965	100.00%	N/A
Republican hold				

==== By county ====
County	Dusty Johnson Republican		Tim Bjorkman Democratic		Various candidates Other parties		Margin		Total
County	#	%	#	%	#	%	#	%	Total
Aurora	728	57.78%	443	35.16%	89	7.06%	285	22.62%	1,260
Beadle	3,825	63.40%	1,983	32.87%	225	3.73%	1,842	30.53%	6,033
Bennett	604	56.08%	438	40.67%	35	3.25%	166	15.41%	1,077
Bon Homme	1,674	61.75%	940	34.67%	97	3.58%	734	27.07%	2,711
Brookings	6,418	55.08%	4,717	40.48%	518	4.45%	1,701	14.60%	11,653
Brown	8,346	58.61%	5,482	38.50%	411	2.89%	2,864	20.11%	14,239
Brule	1,231	57.98%	814	38.34%	78	3.67%	417	19.64%	2,123
Buffalo	172	32.45%	330	62.26%	28	5.28%	-158	-29.81%	530
Butte	2,799	73.97%	836	22.09%	149	3.94%	1,963	51.88%	3,784
Campbell	601	82.90%	108	14.90%	16	2.21%	493	68.00%	725
Charles Mix	2,085	59.07%	1,319	37.37%	126	3.57%	766	21.70%	3,530
Clark	1,150	69.74%	452	27.41%	47	2.85%	698	42.33%	1,649
Clay	1,906	41.37%	2,567	55.72%	134	2.91%	-661	-14.35%	4,607
Codington	7,129	67.52%	3,144	29.78%	285	2.70%	3,985	37.74%	10,558
Corson	484	44.61%	557	51.34%	44	4.06%	-73	-6.73%	1,085
Custer	2,944	67.25%	1,273	29.08%	161	3.68%	1,671	38.17%	4,378
Davison	4,807	66.30%	2,160	29.79%	283	3.90%	2,647	36.51%	7,250
Day	1,541	56.72%	1,072	39.46%	104	3.83%	469	17.26%	2,717
Deuel	1,272	64.60%	624	31.69%	73	3.71%	648	32.91%	1,969
Dewey	623	34.75%	1,084	60.46%	86	4.80%	-461	-25.71%	1,793
Douglas	1,162	77.78%	265	17.74%	67	4.48%	897	60.04%	1,494
Edmunds	1,147	68.07%	488	28.96%	50	2.97%	659	39.11%	1,685
Fall River	2,149	67.51%	882	27.71%	152	4.78%	1,267	39.81%	3,183
Faulk	780	73.24%	255	23.94%	30	2.82%	525	49.30%	1,065
Grant	2,121	66.51%	945	29.63%	123	3.86%	1,176	36.88%	3,189
Gregory	1,484	69.93%	586	27.62%	52	2.45%	898	42.32%	2,122
Haakon	796	84.68%	117	12.45%	27	2.87%	679	72.23%	940
Hamlin	1,939	71.60%	695	25.66%	74	2.73%	1,244	45.94%	2,708
Hand	1,171	71.01%	429	26.02%	49	2.97%	742	45.00%	1,649
Hanson	1,022	64.04%	536	33.58%	38	2.38%	486	30.45%	1,596
Harding	568	83.28%	94	13.78%	20	2.93%	474	69.50%	682
Hughes	5,366	67.43%	2,332	29.30%	260	3.27%	3,034	38.13%	7,958
Hutchinson	2,281	69.76%	883	27.00%	106	3.24%	1,398	42.75%	3,270
Hyde	462	70.75%	164	25.11%	27	4.13%	298	45.64%	653
Jackson	575	59.16%	370	38.07%	27	2.78%	205	21.09%	972
Jerauld	567	62.51%	312	34.40%	28	3.09%	255	28.11%	907
Jones	420	77.49%	94	17.34%	28	5.17%	326	60.15%	542
Kingsbury	1,507	61.97%	855	35.16%	70	2.88%	652	26.81%	2,432
Lake	3,110	60.15%	1,925	37.23%	135	2.61%	1,185	22.92%	5,170
Lawrence	6,868	63.33%	3,489	32.17%	487	4.49%	3,379	31.16%	10,844
Lincoln	15,049	62.69%	8,266	34.43%	690	2.87%	6,783	28.26%	24,005
Lyman	830	60.01%	500	36.15%	53	3.83%	330	23.86%	1,383
Marshall	1,024	52.65%	860	44.22%	61	3.14%	164	8.43%	1,945
McCook	1,373	55.27%	1,047	42.15%	64	2.58%	326	13.12%	2,484
McPherson	798	76.22%	216	20.63%	33	3.15%	582	55.59%	1,047
Meade	7,160	70.60%	2,508	24.73%	474	4.67%	4,652	45.87%	10,142
Mellette	358	51.22%	303	43.35%	38	5.44%	55	7.87%	699
Miner	642	58.42%	413	37.58%	44	4.00%	229	20.84%	1,099
Minnehaha	38,017	54.33%	29,365	41.97%	2,592	3.70%	8,652	12.36%	69,974
Moody	1,622	57.42%	1,090	38.58%	113	4.00%	532	18.83%	2,825
Oglala Lakota	336	11.35%	2,473	83.52%	152	5.13%	-2,137	-72.17%	2,961
Pennington	25,433	61.51%	14,092	34.08%	1,821	4.40%	11,341	27.43%	41,346
Perkins	1,064	79.82%	224	16.80%	45	3.38%	840	63.02%	1,333
Potter	923	77.17%	248	20.74%	25	2.09%	675	56.44%	1,196
Roberts	1,915	51.98%	1,664	45.17%	105	2.85%	251	6.81%	3,684
Sanborn	678	66.67%	292	28.71%	47	4.62%	386	37.95%	1,017
Spink	1,736	62.45%	958	34.46%	86	3.09%	778	27.99%	2,780
Stanley	1,042	70.45%	377	25.49%	60	4.06%	665	44.96%	1,479
Sully	613	75.77%	182	22.50%	14	1.73%	431	53.28%	809
Todd	506	23.05%	1,598	72.80%	91	4.15%	-1,092	-49.75%	2,195
Tripp	1,814	74.28%	556	22.77%	72	2.95%	1,258	51.52%	2,442
Turner	2,467	64.14%	1,262	32.81%	117	3.04%	1,205	31.33%	3,846
Union	4,282	64.69%	2,152	32.51%	185	2.79%	2,130	32.18%	6,619
Walworth	1,648	73.44%	528	23.53%	68	3.03%	1,120	49.91%	2,244
Yankton	5,191	58.44%	3,383	38.09%	308	3.47%	1,808	20.36%	8,882
Ziebach	340	42.66%	417	52.32%	40	5.02%	-77	-9.66%	797
Totals	202,695	60.33%	121,033	36.03%	12,237	3.64%	81,662	24.31%	335,965

==== Counties that flipped from Republican to Democratic ====
- Corson (largest city: McLaughlin)

== See also ==
- 2018 United States House of Representatives elections
- 2018 United States elections
