= 2000 United States House of Representatives election in South Dakota =

- November 7, 2000
- Turnout: 68.4%
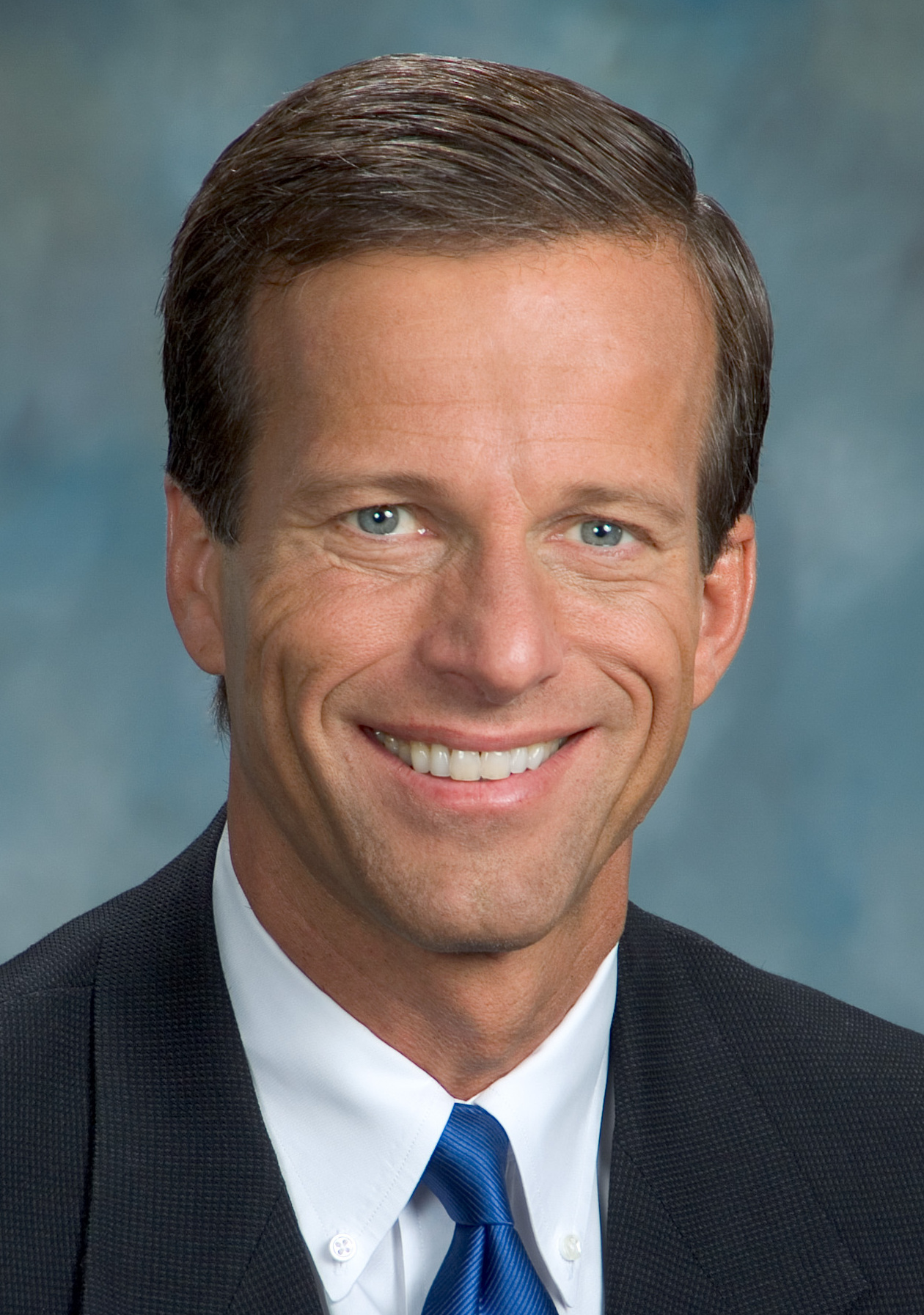

Nominee	John Thune	Curt Hohn
Party	Republican	Democratic
Popular vote	231,083	78,321
Percentage	73.42%	24.88%
- County results Thune: 60–70% 70–80% 80–90% 90–100% Hohn: 40–50% 60–70%
U.S. Representative before election
John Thune
Republican
Elected U.S. Representative
John Thune
Republican

The 2000 United States House of Representatives election in South Dakota took place on Tuesday, November 7, 2000, with a primary election on June 6. Voters selected a representative for their single at-large district, who ran on a statewide ballot. Incumbent Republican representative John Thune won the race by a wide margin, outrunning the Republican candidate for president George W. Bush by 13 points in the state.

== Republican primary ==
No Republican primary was held.

=== Nominee ===
- John Thune, incumbent U.S. representative

== Democratic primary ==
Curt Hohn won the three-way Democratic primary with 56.07% of the vote. Only 13.09% of the Democratic electorate turned out to vote in the primary.

=== Nominee ===
- Curt Hohn, manager of WEB Water

=== Eliminated in primary ===
- Raymond Earl Osloond Sr.
- Steve Sandven, tribal lawyer

=== Results ===
Democratic primary results
Party	Candidate	Votes	%
Democratic	Curt Hohn	12,827	56.07%
Democratic	Steve Sandven	8,333	36.43%
Democratic	Raymond Earl Osloond Sr.	1,715	7.50%
Total votes		22,875	100.00%

== Libertarian primary ==
No Libertarian primary was held.

=== Nominee ===
- Brian Lerohl

== General election ==
=== Results ===
2000 United States House of Representatives election in South Dakota
Party	Candidate	Votes	%
Republican	John Thune (incumbent)	231,083	73.42%
Democratic	Curt Hohn	78,321	24.88%
Libertarian	Brian Lerohl	5,357	1.70%
Total votes		314,761	100.00%

== See also ==
- 2000 United States presidential election in South Dakota
