= 2020 South Dakota elections =

- 3 November 2020

South Dakota state elections in 2020 were held on Tuesday, November 3, 2020. Its primary elections were held on June 2, 2020 (with runoffs on August 11, 2020).

In addition to the U.S. presidential race, South Dakota voters elected the Class II U.S. Senator from South Dakota, one of three seats on the state's Public Utilities Commission, its at-large seat to the House of Representatives, one of five seats on the South Dakota Supreme Court, all of the seats of the South Dakota House of Representatives, and all of the seats in the South Dakota State Senate. Three ballot measures were also voted on.

== Federal offices ==
=== President of the United States ===
South Dakota has three electoral votes in the Electoral College.

=== United States House of Representatives ===
Incumbent Dusty Johnson ran for re-election.

== Public Utilities Commission ==
Incumbent Gary Hanson ran for another term.

== State Judiciary ==
Incumbent Steven Jensen was up for re-election to an eight-year term in the state Supreme Court. He was appointed by Governor Mike Rounds.

== State legislature ==
All 70 seats of the South Dakota House of Representatives and all 35 seats of the South Dakota State Senate were up for election. Before the election the composition of the South Dakota State Legislature was:

=== State senate ===
Party	# of seats
Republican	30 (Note: Including one Democrat caucusing with Republicans)
Democratic	5
Total	35

=== House of Representatives ===
Party	# of seats
Republican	59
Democratic	11
Total	70

After the election the composition of the South Dakota State Legislature was:

=== State senate ===
Party	# of seats
Republican	32
Democratic	3
Total	35

=== House of Representatives ===
Party	# of seats
Republican	62
Democratic	8
Total	70

== Ballot measures ==
South Dakota Initiated Measure 26, Medical Marijuana Initiative would mandate a program for access to medicinal cannabis for adults with certain pre-existing conditions.

South Dakota Constitutional Amendment A, Marijuana Legalization Initiative would allow adults at least 21 years old to recreationally consume marijuana by requiring the state legislature to pass laws providing for the sale of hemp in addition to the use of medical marijuana by April 1, 2022.

=== Polling ===
A poll by Public Opinion Strategies taken from June 27–30, 2020 and sponsored by the No Way On A Committee (which opposes both measures) showed that support for Amendment A was around 60% and support for Initiated Measure 26 was at 70%.

Initiated Measure 26

Poll source	Date(s) administered	Sample size (Note: Key: A – all adults RV – registered voters LV – likely voters V – unclear)	Margin of error	For Initiated Measure 26	Against Initiated Measure 26	Undecided
Nielson Brothers Polling	October 24–28, 2020	462 (LV)	± 4.61%	57%	33%	9%
Mason-Dixon	October 19–21, 2020	625 (LV)	± 4%	74%	23%	3%

Amendment A

Poll source	Date(s) administered	Sample size	Margin of error	For Amendment A	Against Amendment A	Undecided
Nielson Brothers Polling	October 24–28, 2020	455 (LV)	± 4.59%	48%	45%	8%
Mason-Dixon	October 19–21, 2020	625 (LV)	± 4%	51%	44%	5%

=== Results ===
==== Constitutional Amendment A ====
Legalize Marijuana
Choice	Votes	%
For	225,260	54.18
Against	190,477	45.82
Total	415,737	100.00
Registered voters/turnout	578,655	71.84

==== Constitutional Amendment B ====
Constitutional Amendment B
- Deadwood Sports Wagering

Results
Choice	Votes	%
Yes	239,620	58.47%
No	170,191	41.53%
Valid votes	409,811	100.00%
Invalid or blank votes	0	0.00%
Total votes	409,811	100.00%
Registered voters/turnout	578,655	70.82%
Yes
50–60%
60–70%
No
50–60%
60–70%

Constitutional Amendment B allowed the legislature to legalize sports betting in Deadwood. It passed with 58.5% of the vote.

Deadwood Sports Wagering
Choice	Votes	%
For	239,620	58.47
Against	170,191	41.53
Total	409,811	100.00
Registered voters/turnout	578,655	70.82

==== Initiated Measure 26 ====
Legalize Medical Marijuana
Choice	Votes	%
For	291,754	69.92
Against	125,488	30.08
Total	417,242	100.00
Registered voters/turnout	578,655	72.11
