= Joe Biden–Donald Trump presidential debate =

Former President Joe Biden has faced off against current President Donald Trump in three separate presidential debates:

- First 2020 United States presidential debate
- Second 2020 United States presidential debate
- 2024 Joe Biden–Donald Trump presidential debate
