= 2016 United States House of Representatives election in South Dakota =

2016 United States House of Representatives election in South Dakota's at-large district
- November 8, 2016
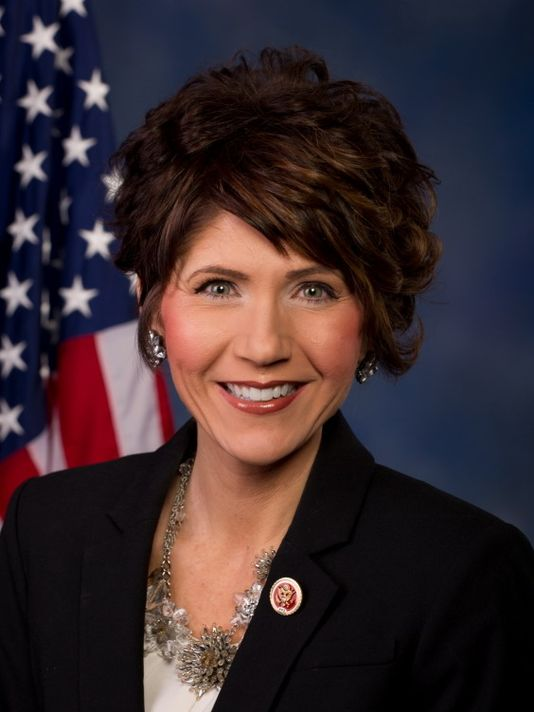

Nominee	Kristi Noem	Paula Hawks
Party	Republican	Democratic
Popular vote	237,163	132,810
Percentage	64.10%	35.90%
- Noem: 50–60% 60–70% 70–80% 80–90% >90% Hawks: 50–60% 60–70% 70–80% 80–90%
U.S. Representative before election
Kristi Noem
Republican
Elected U.S. Representative
Kristi Noem
Republican

The 2016 United States House of Representatives election in South Dakota was held on November 8, 2016, to elect the U.S. representative from South Dakota's at-large congressional district, who would represent the state of South Dakota in the 115th United States Congress. The election coincided with the 2016 U.S. presidential election, as well as other elections to the House of Representatives, elections to the United States Senate and various state and local elections. The primaries were held on June 7.

Incumbent Republican Kristi Noem won re-election.

== Republican primary ==
=== Candidates ===
==== Declared ====
- Kristi Noem, incumbent U.S. Representative

== Democratic primary ==
=== Candidates ===
==== Declared ====
- Paula Hawks, South Dakota State Representative

== General election ==
=== Predictions ===
Source	Ranking	As of
The Cook Political Report	Safe R	November 7, 2016
Daily Kos Elections	Safe R	November 7, 2016
Rothenberg	Safe R	November 3, 2016
Sabato's Crystal Ball	Safe R	November 7, 2016
RCP	Safe R	October 31, 2016

=== Polling ===
Poll source	Date(s) administered	Sample size	Margin of error	Kristi Noem (R)	Paula Hawks (D)	Other	Undecided
Nielson Brothers Polling	October 24–26, 2016	600	± 4%	51%	41%	—	8%
Mason-Dixon	October 18–20, 2016	400	± 5.0%	59%	35%	—	6%

=== Results ===
2016 South Dakota's at-large congressional district election
Party	Candidate	Votes	%	±%
Republican	Kristi Noem (incumbent)	237,163	64.10%	−2.43%
Democratic	Paula Hawks	132,810	35.90%	+2.43%
Total votes		369,973	100.00%	N/A
Republican hold				

==== By county ====
County	Kristi Noem Republican		Paula Hawks Democratic		Margin		Total
County	#	%	#	%	#	%	Total
Aurora	929	65.38%	492	34.62%	437	30.75%	1,421
Beadle	4,491	65.74%	2,340	34.26%	2,151	31.49%	6,831
Bennett	721	63.25%	419	36.75%	302	26.49%	1,140
Bon Homme	1,942	64.99%	1,046	35.01%	896	29.99%	2,988
Brookings	7,418	58.09%	5,352	41.91%	2,066	16.18%	12,770
Brown	9,676	59.85%	6,492	40.15%	3,184	19.69%	16,168
Brule	1,585	68.97%	713	31.03%	872	37.95%	2,298
Buffalo	200	40.82%	290	59.18%	-90	-18.37%	490
Butte	3,407	79.20%	895	20.80%	2,512	58.39%	4,302
Campbell	699	84.62%	127	15.38%	572	69.25%	826
Charles Mix	2,288	66.47%	1,154	33.53%	1,134	32.95%	3,442
Clark	1,099	65.30%	584	34.70%	515	30.60%	1,683
Clay	2,427	47.86%	2,644	52.14%	-217	-4.28%	5,071
Codington	7,866	66.69%	3,928	33.31%	3,938	33.39%	11,794
Corson	631	55.21%	512	44.79%	119	10.41%	1,143
Custer	3,445	72.79%	1,288	27.21%	2,157	45.57%	4,733
Davison	5,253	65.56%	2,759	34.44%	2,494	31.13%	8,012
Day	1,580	57.00%	1,192	43.00%	388	14.00%	2,772
Deuel	1,401	66.71%	699	33.29%	702	33.43%	2,100
Dewey	734	43.35%	959	56.65%	-225	-13.29%	1,693
Douglas	1,334	82.81%	277	17.19%	1,057	65.61%	1,611
Edmunds	1,394	72.83%	520	27.17%	874	45.66%	1,914
Fall River	2,595	73.51%	935	26.49%	1,660	47.03%	3,530
Faulk	838	73.57%	301	26.43%	537	47.15%	1,139
Grant	2,467	68.53%	1,133	31.47%	1,334	37.06%	3,600
Gregory	1,519	72.64%	572	27.36%	947	45.29%	2,091
Haakon	926	89.47%	109	10.53%	817	78.94%	1,035
Hamlin	2,062	73.85%	730	26.15%	1,332	47.71%	2,792
Hand	1,381	75.10%	458	24.90%	923	50.19%	1,839
Hanson	1,444	73.34%	525	26.66%	919	46.67%	1,969
Harding	679	89.81%	77	10.19%	602	79.63%	756
Hughes	5,596	67.70%	2,670	32.30%	2,926	35.40%	8,266
Hutchinson	2,551	75.47%	829	24.53%	1,722	50.95%	3,380
Hyde	518	74.64%	176	25.36%	342	49.28%	694
Jackson	745	68.54%	342	31.46%	403	37.07%	1,087
Jerauld	638	64.90%	345	35.10%	293	29.81%	983
Jones	460	82.00%	101	18.00%	359	63.99%	561
Kingsbury	1,673	65.30%	889	34.70%	784	30.60%	2,562
Lake	4,095	60.68%	2,654	39.32%	1,441	21.35%	6,749
Lawrence	8,041	68.06%	3,774	31.94%	4,267	36.12%	11,815
Lincoln	16,739	66.11%	8,581	33.89%	8,158	32.22%	25,320
Lyman	948	66.06%	487	33.94%	461	32.13%	1,435
Marshall	1,120	56.82%	851	43.18%	269	13.65%	1,971
McCook	1,786	67.91%	844	32.09%	942	35.82%	2,630
McPherson	940	79.59%	241	20.41%	699	59.19%	1,181
Meade	8,756	75.78%	2,799	24.22%	5,957	51.55%	11,555
Mellette	419	60.46%	274	39.54%	145	20.92%	693
Miner	694	63.55%	398	36.45%	296	27.11%	1,092
Minnehaha	44,809	57.45%	33,184	42.55%	11,625	14.91%	77,993
Moody	1,545	52.30%	1,409	47.70%	136	4.60%	2,954
Oglala Lakota	514	17.87%	2,362	82.13%	-1,848	-64.26%	2,876
Pennington	31,746	67.19%	15,502	32.81%	16,244	34.38%	47,248
Perkins	1,353	83.99%	258	16.01%	1,095	67.97%	1,611
Potter	1,076	80.06%	268	19.94%	808	60.12%	1,344
Roberts	2,200	56.02%	1,727	43.98%	473	12.04%	3,927
Sanborn	804	71.21%	325	28.79%	479	42.43%	1,129
Spink	1,875	62.98%	1,102	37.02%	773	25.97%	2,977
Stanley	1,132	72.33%	433	27.67%	699	44.66%	1,565
Sully	668	77.76%	191	22.24%	477	55.53%	859
Todd	580	27.51%	1,528	72.49%	-948	-44.97%	2,108
Tripp	1,976	75.33%	647	24.67%	1,329	50.67%	2,623
Turner	2,959	70.82%	1,219	29.18%	1,740	41.65%	4,178
Union	5,758	73.49%	2,077	26.51%	3,681	46.98%	7,835
Walworth	1,891	76.93%	567	23.07%	1,324	53.86%	2,458
Yankton	5,763	60.08%	3,830	39.92%	1,933	20.15%	9,593
Ziebach	364	47.40%	404	52.60%	-40	-5.21%	768
Totals	237,163	64.10%	132,810	35.90%	104,353	28.21%	369,973

==== Counties that flipped from Republican to Democratic ====
- Ziebach (largest city: Dupree)

== See also ==
- United States House of Representatives elections, 2016
- United States elections, 2016
