= South Dakota's at-large congressional district =

At-large U.S. House district for South Dakota

Coordinates: 44.5°N 100°W

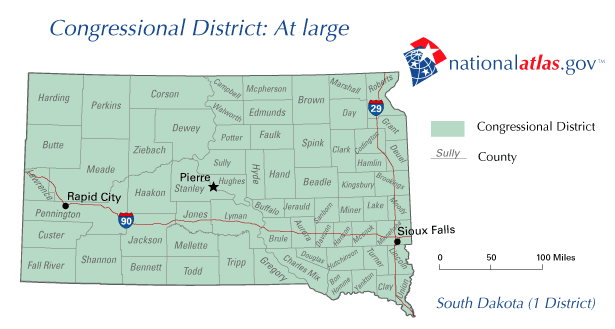
- Representative: Dusty Johnson; R–Mitchell
- Area: 75,885 mi^{2} (196,540 km^{2})
- Distribution: 55.8% urban; 44.2% rural
- Population (2025): 935,094
- Median household income: $80,506
- Ethnicity: 79.6% White; 8.4% Native American; 4.4% Hispanic; 3.9% Two or more races; 2.0% Black; 1.5% Asian; 0.3% other
- Cook PVI: R+15

South Dakota's at-large congressional district is the sole congressional district for the state of South Dakota. Based on area, it is the fourth largest congressional district in the nation.

The district is currently represented by Dusty Johnson, with member-elect Marty Jackley set to take office in January 2027.

== History ==
The district was created when South Dakota achieved statehood on November 2, 1889, as one of two for the new state. Following the 1910 United States census South Dakota gained a third seat. The third district was eliminated after the 1930 census. During the redistricting cycle after the 1980 census, the second seat was eliminated, leaving the single at-large district that the state has had since.

=== Voter registration ===
Voter registration and party enrollment as of 2024
Party	Total voters	Percentage
Democratic	146,090	23.37%
Republican	317,117	50.71%
Libertarian	2,981	0.48%
Independent/NPA	158,991	25.43%
Total	597,069	100%

== Statewide election results ==
Year	Office	Results
2000	President	Bush 60% - Gore 38%
2004	President	Bush 60% - Kerry 38%
2008	President	McCain 53% - Obama 45%
2012	President	Romney 58% - Obama 40%
2016	President	Trump 62% - Clinton 32%
2020	President	Trump 62% - Biden 36%
2024	President	Trump 63% - Harris 34%

== Election history ==
=== 2004 special ===
Incumbent U.S. Representative Bill Janklow resigned the seat on January 20, 2004, after he was convicted of second-degree manslaughter, triggering a special election. Democrat Stephanie Herseth was selected as the Democratic nominee for this special election and she defeated Republican Larry Diedrich with 51 percent of the vote in a close-fought election on June 1, 2004. Herseth's victory briefly gave the state its first all-Democratic congressional delegation since 1937.

=== 2004 general ===
In the November general election, Herseth was elected to a full term with 53.4 percent of the vote, an increase of a few percentage points compared with the even closer June special elections. Herseth's vote margin in June was about 3,000 votes, but by November it had grown to over 29,000.

Herseth thereby became the first woman in state history to win a full term in the U.S. Congress.

Both elections were hard-fought and close compared to many House races in the rest of the United States, and the special election was watched closely by a national audience. The general election was also viewed as one of the most competitive in the country, but was overshadowed in the state by the highly competitive U.S. Senate race between Democrat Tom Daschle and Republican John Thune, which Thune narrowly won.

=== 2006 ===
South Dakota's at-large congressional district election, 2006
Party	Candidate	Votes	%	±%
Democratic	Stephanie Herseth Sandlin (Incumbent)	230,468	69.09	+15.73
Republican	Bruce Whalen	97,864	29.34	−16.57
Libertarian	Larry Rudebusch	5,230	1.57	+0.85
Democratic hold		Swing		
Turnout		333,562		

=== 2008 ===
South Dakota's at-large congressional district election, 2008
Party	Candidate	Votes	%	±%
Democratic	Stephanie Herseth Sandlin (Incumbent)	256,041	67.56	−1.53
Republican	Chris Lien	122,966	32.44	+3.10
Democratic hold		Swing		
Turnout		379,007		

=== 2010 ===
South Dakota's at-large congressional district election, 2010
Party	Candidate	Votes	%	±%
Republican	Kristi Noem	153,703	48.12	+15.68
Democratic	Stephanie Herseth Sandlin (Incumbent)	146,589	45.89	−21.67
Independent	B. Thomas Marking	19,134	5.99	+5.99
Republican gain from Democratic		Swing		
Turnout		319,426		

=== 2012 ===
South Dakota's at-large congressional district election, 2012
Party	Candidate	Votes	%	±%
Republican	Kristi Noem (Incumbent)	207,640	57.45	+9.33
Democratic	Matt Varilek	153,789	42.55	−3.34
Republican hold		Swing		
Turnout		361,429		

=== 2014 ===
South Dakota's at-large congressional district election, 2014
Party	Candidate	Votes	%	±%
Republican	Kristi Noem (Incumbent)	183,834	66.50	+9.05
Democratic	Corinna Robinson	92,485	33.50	−9.05
Republican hold		Swing		
Turnout		276,319		

=== 2016 ===
South Dakota's at-large congressional district election, 2016
Party	Candidate	Votes	%	±%
Republican	Kristi Noem (Incumbent)	237,163	64.10	−2.4
Democratic	Paula Hawks	132,810	35.90	+2.4
Republican hold		Swing		
Turnout		369,973		

=== 2018 ===
South Dakota's at-large congressional district election, 2018
Party	Candidate	Votes	%	±%
Republican	Dusty Johnson	202,446	60.30	−3.8
Democratic	Tim Bjorkman	120,816	36.00	+0.1
Republican hold		Swing		
Turnout		323,262		

=== 2020 ===
South Dakota's at-large congressional district election, 2020
Party	Candidate	Votes	%	±%
Republican	Dusty Johnson (incumbent)	321,984	80.96%	+20.61
Libertarian	Randy Luallin	75,748	19.04%	+17.58
Total votes		397,732	100.0%	
Republican hold				

=== 2022 ===
South Dakota's at-large congressional district election, 2022
Party	Candidate	Votes	%	±%
Republican	Dusty Johnson (incumbent)	253,821	77.42%	–3.54
Libertarian	Collin Duprel	74,020	22.58%	+3.54
Total votes		327,841	100.00%	
Republican hold				

=== 2024 ===
South Dakota's at-large congressional district election, 2024
Party	Candidate	Votes	%	±%
Republican	Dusty Johnson (incumbent)	303,630	72.04%	−5.38%
Democratic	Sheryl Johnson	117,818	27.96%	N/A
Total votes		421,448	100.00%	N/A
Republican hold				

== List of members representing the district ==
=== 1889–1913: two seats ===
Two seats were created in 1889.

Years	Cong ress	Seat A			Seat B		
Years	Cong ress	Representative	Party	Electoral history	Representative	Party	Electoral history
November 2, 1889 – March 3, 1891	51st	John Pickler (Faulkton)	Republican	Elected in 1889. Re-elected in 1890. Re-elected in 1892. Re-elected in 1894. Retired.	Oscar S. Gifford (Canton)	Republican	Elected in 1889. Lost renomination.
March 4, 1891 – August 14, 1891	52nd	John Pickler (Faulkton)	Republican	Elected in 1889. Re-elected in 1890. Re-elected in 1892. Re-elected in 1894. Retired.	John Rankin Gamble (Yankton)	Republican	Elected in 1890. Died.
August 14, 1891 – December 7, 1891	52nd	John Pickler (Faulkton)	Republican	Elected in 1889. Re-elected in 1890. Re-elected in 1892. Re-elected in 1894. Retired.	Vacant		
December 7, 1891 – March 3, 1893	52nd	John Pickler (Faulkton)	Republican	Elected in 1889. Re-elected in 1890. Re-elected in 1892. Re-elected in 1894. Retired.	John L. Jolley (Vermillion)	Republican	Elected to finish Gamble's term. Retired.
March 4, 1893 – March 3, 1895	53rd	John Pickler (Faulkton)	Republican	Elected in 1889. Re-elected in 1890. Re-elected in 1892. Re-elected in 1894. Retired.	William V. Lucas (Hot Springs)	Republican	Elected in 1892. Lost renomination.
March 4, 1895 – March 3, 1897	54th	John Pickler (Faulkton)	Republican	Elected in 1889. Re-elected in 1890. Re-elected in 1892. Re-elected in 1894. Retired.	Robert J. Gamble (Yankton)	Republican	Elected in 1894. Lost re-election.
March 4, 1897 – March 3, 1899	55th	John Edward Kelley (Flandreau)	Populist	Elected in 1896. Lost re-election.	Freeman Knowles (Deadwood)	Populist	Elected in 1896. Lost re-election.
March 4, 1899 – March 3, 1901	56th	Charles H. Burke (Pierre)	Republican	Elected in 1898. Re-elected in 1900. Re-elected in 1902. Re-elected in 1904. Lost renomination.	Robert J. Gamble (Yankton)	Republican	Elected in 1898. Retired to run for U.S. Senator.
March 4, 1901 – March 3, 1907	57th 58th 59th	Charles H. Burke (Pierre)	Republican	Elected in 1898. Re-elected in 1900. Re-elected in 1902. Re-elected in 1904. Lost renomination.	Eben Martin (Deadwood)	Republican	Elected in 1900. Re-elected in 1902. Re-elected in 1904. Retired to run for U.S. Senator.
March 4, 1907 – June 26, 1908	60th	Philo Hall (Brookings)	Republican	Elected in 1906. Lost renomination.	William H. Parker (Deadwood)	Republican	Elected in 1906. Died.
June 26, 1908 – November 3, 1908	60th	Philo Hall (Brookings)	Republican	Elected in 1906. Lost renomination.	Vacant		
November 3, 1908 – March 3, 1909	60th	Philo Hall (Brookings)	Republican	Elected in 1906. Lost renomination.	Eben Martin (Deadwood)	Republican	Elected to finish Parker's term. Also elected to next full term. Re-elected in 1910. Redistricted to the 3rd district.
March 4, 1909 – March 3, 1913	61st 62nd	Charles H. Burke (Pierre)	Republican	Elected in 1908. Re-elected in 1910. Redistricted to the 2nd district.	Eben Martin (Deadwood)	Republican	Elected to finish Parker's term. Also elected to next full term. Re-elected in 1910. Redistricted to the 3rd district.

In 1913, the two at-large seats were replaced by three districts. There were no at-large seats, therefore, until 1983.

=== 1983–present: one seat ===
By 1983, the remaining two district seats were reduced to one at-large seat.

Member	Party	Years	Cong ress	Electoral history
Tom Daschle (Aberdeen)	Democratic	January 3, 1983 – January 3, 1987	98th 99th	Redistricted from the 1st district. and re-elected in 1982. Re-elected in 1984. Retired to run for U.S. Senator.
Tim Johnson (Vermillion)	Democratic	January 3, 1987 – January 3, 1997	100th 101st 102nd 103rd 104th	Elected in 1986. Re-elected in 1988. Re-elected in 1990. Re-elected in 1992. Re-elected in 1994. Retired to run for U.S. Senator.
John Thune (Pierre)	Republican	January 3, 1997 – January 3, 2003	105th 106th 107th	Elected in 1996. Re-elected in 1998. Re-elected in 2000. Retired to run for U.S. Senator.
Bill Janklow (Brandon)	Republican	January 3, 2003 – January 20, 2004	108th	Elected in 2002. Resigned when convicted of vehicular manslaughter.
Vacant		January 20, 2004 – June 3, 2004	108th	
Stephanie Herseth Sandlin (Brookings)	Democratic	June 3, 2004 – January 3, 2011	108th 109th 110th 111th	Elected to finish Janklow's term. Re-elected in 2004. Re-elected in 2006. Re-elected in 2008. Lost re-election.
Kristi Noem (Castlewood)	Republican	January 3, 2011 – January 3, 2019	112th 113th 114th 115th	Elected in 2010. Re-elected in 2012. Re-elected in 2014. Re-elected in 2016. Retired to run for governor of South Dakota.
Dusty Johnson (Mitchell)	Republican	January 3, 2019 – present	116th 117th 118th 119th	Elected in 2018. Re-elected in 2020. Re-elected in 2022. Re-elected in 2024. Retired to run for governor of South Dakota.
Marty Jackley (Pierre)	Republican	Assuming office on January 3, 2027		Elected in 2026.
