= 2012 United States House of Representatives election in South Dakota =

- November 6, 2012
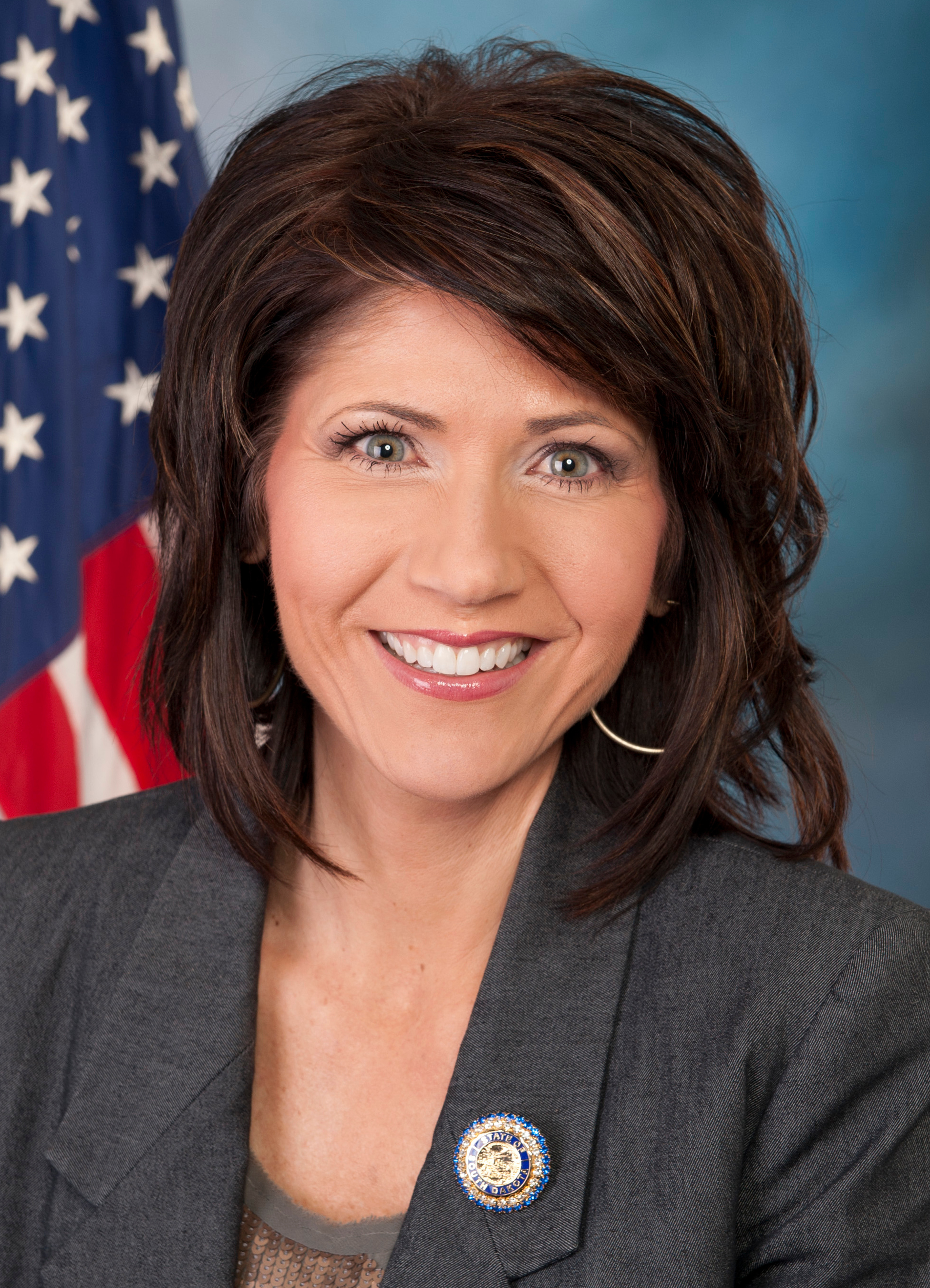

Nominee	Kristi Noem	Matt Varilek
Party	Republican	Democratic
Popular vote	207,640	153,789
Percentage	57.45%	42.55%
- County results Noem: 50–60% 60–70% 70–80% 80–90% Varilek: 50–60% 60–70% 70–80% 80–90%
U.S. Representative before election
Kristi Noem
Republican
Elected U.S. Representative
Kristi Noem
Republican

The 2012 United States House of Representatives election in South Dakota was held on Tuesday, November 6, 2012, to elect the single U.S. representative from South Dakota's At-large congressional district, comprising the entire state of South Dakota. The election coincided with the elections of other federal and state offices, including a quadrennial presidential election.

== Republican primary ==
=== Candidates ===
==== Nominee ====
- Kristi Noem, incumbent U.S. representative

== Democratic primary ==
=== Candidates ===
==== Nominee ====
- Matt Varilek, staffer for Senator Tim Johnson

==== Eliminated in primary ====
- Jeff Barth, Minnehaha County commissioner

==== Declined ====
- Stephanie Herseth Sandlin, former U.S. representative

=== Primary results ===
Democratic primary results
Party	Candidate	Votes	%
Democratic	Matt Varilek	21,759	71.9
Democratic	Jeff Barth	8,494	28.1
Total votes		30,253	100.0

== General election ==
=== Polling ===
Poll source	Date(s) administered	Sample size	Margin of error	Kristi Noem (R)	Matt Varilek (D)	Undecided
Nielson Brothers Polling	October 31 – November 4, 2012	633	± 3.90%	54%	41%	5%
Nielson Brothers Polling	October 28–31, 2012	671	± 3.78%	50%	44%	5%
Nielson Brothers Polling	August 29 – September 6, 2012	509	± 4.34%	51%	42%	7%
Nielson Brothers Polling	July 19–23, 2012	541	± 4.21%	47%	46%	7%

Hypothetical polling

Poll source	Date(s) administered	Sample size	Margin of error	Kristi Noem (R)	Stephanie H. Sandlin (D)	Undecided
Public Policy Polling	January 28–30, 2011	1,045	± 3.0%	45%	46%	8%

=== Endorsements ===
Matt Varilek (D)

Organizations

- Democratic Congressional Campaign Committee "Emerging Races" Program

=== Predictions ===
Source	Ranking	As of
The Cook Political Report	Likely R	November 5, 2012
Rothenberg	Safe R	November 2, 2012
Roll Call	Safe R	November 4, 2012
Sabato's Crystal Ball	Likely R	November 5, 2012
NY Times	Safe R	November 4, 2012
RCP	Safe R	November 4, 2012
The Hill	Safe R	November 4, 2012

=== Results ===
2012 South Dakota's at-large congressional district election
Party	Candidate	Votes	%	±%
Republican	Kristi Noem (incumbent)	207,640	57.45%	+9.33%
Democratic	Matt Varilek	153,789	42.55%	−3.34%
Total votes		361,429	100.00%	N/A
Republican hold				

==== By county ====
County	Kristi Noem Republican		Matt Varilek Democratic		Margin		Total
County	#	%	#	%	#	%	Total
Aurora	793	56.68%	606	43.32%	187	13.37%	1,399
Beadle	4,069	56.16%	3,177	43.84%	892	12.31%	7,246
Bennett	682	56.46%	526	43.54%	156	12.91%	1,208
Bon Homme	1,687	54.70%	1,397	45.30%	290	9.40%	3,084
Brookings	6,160	49.85%	6,197	50.15%	-37	-0.30%	12,357
Brown	7,673	47.93%	8,335	52.07%	-662	-4.14%	16,008
Brule	1,440	60.30%	948	39.70%	492	20.60%	2,388
Buffalo	181	28.41%	456	71.59%	-275	-43.17%	637
Butte	3,100	74.00%	1,089	26.00%	2,011	48.01%	4,189
Campbell	597	76.54%	183	23.46%	414	53.08%	780
Charles Mix	2,219	58.83%	1,553	41.17%	666	17.66%	3,772
Clark	1,102	59.92%	737	40.08%	365	19.85%	1,839
Clay	2,163	41.69%	3,025	58.31%	-862	-16.62%	5,188
Codington	6,754	58.57%	4,778	41.43%	1,976	17.13%	11,532
Corson	616	52.38%	560	47.62%	56	4.76%	1,176
Custer	3,068	68.41%	1,417	31.59%	1,651	36.81%	4,485
Davison	4,698	58.89%	3,279	41.11%	1,419	17.79%	7,977
Day	1,278	44.36%	1,603	55.64%	-325	-11.28%	2,881
Deuel	1,254	57.87%	913	42.13%	341	15.74%	2,167
Dewey	719	38.43%	1,152	61.57%	-433	-23.14%	1,871
Douglas	1,327	78.20%	370	21.80%	957	56.39%	1,697
Edmunds	1,167	60.56%	760	39.44%	407	21.12%	1,927
Fall River	2,370	67.77%	1,127	32.23%	1,243	35.54%	3,497
Faulk	728	65.06%	391	34.94%	337	30.12%	1,119
Grant	2,137	59.02%	1,484	40.98%	653	18.03%	3,621
Gregory	1,431	66.31%	727	33.69%	704	32.62%	2,158
Haakon	910	83.33%	182	16.67%	728	66.67%	1,092
Hamlin	1,871	67.11%	917	32.89%	954	34.22%	2,788
Hand	1,207	64.93%	652	35.07%	555	29.85%	1,859
Hanson	1,573	66.99%	775	33.01%	798	33.99%	2,348
Harding	642	87.70%	90	12.30%	552	75.41%	732
Hughes	5,040	61.99%	3,090	38.01%	1,950	23.99%	8,130
Hutchinson	2,391	69.40%	1,054	30.60%	1,337	38.81%	3,445
Hyde	502	69.05%	225	30.95%	277	38.10%	727
Jackson	674	61.89%	415	38.11%	259	23.78%	1,089
Jerauld	564	55.90%	445	44.10%	119	11.79%	1,009
Jones	479	77.89%	136	22.11%	343	55.77%	615
Kingsbury	1,458	56.29%	1,132	43.71%	326	12.59%	2,590
Lake	3,269	52.85%	2,916	47.15%	353	5.71%	6,185
Lawrence	7,075	62.73%	4,204	37.27%	2,871	25.45%	11,279
Lincoln	13,107	60.12%	8,696	39.88%	4,411	20.23%	21,803
Lyman	916	58.46%	651	41.54%	265	16.91%	1,567
Marshall	902	45.44%	1,083	54.56%	-181	-9.12%	1,985
McCook	1,614	61.67%	1,003	38.33%	611	23.35%	2,617
McPherson	884	72.64%	333	27.36%	551	45.28%	1,217
Meade	7,692	71.75%	3,028	28.25%	4,664	43.51%	10,720
Mellette	411	53.45%	358	46.55%	53	6.89%	769
Miner	623	54.03%	530	45.97%	93	8.07%	1,153
Minnehaha	38,860	51.34%	36,827	48.66%	2,033	2.69%	75,687
Moody	1,549	50.97%	1,490	49.03%	59	1.94%	3,039
Pennington	28,418	64.68%	15,516	35.32%	12,902	29.37%	43,934
Perkins	1,197	76.44%	369	23.56%	828	52.87%	1,566
Potter	952	69.54%	417	30.46%	535	39.08%	1,369
Roberts	2,017	47.47%	2,232	52.53%	-215	-5.06%	4,249
Sanborn	693	61.99%	425	38.01%	268	23.97%	1,118
Shannon	504	16.24%	2,599	83.76%	-2,095	-67.52%	3,103
Spink	1,625	53.17%	1,431	46.83%	194	6.35%	3,056
Stanley	1,013	65.86%	525	34.14%	488	31.73%	1,538
Sully	596	73.22%	218	26.78%	378	46.44%	814
Todd	687	27.77%	1,787	72.23%	-1,100	-44.46%	2,474
Tripp	1,887	69.45%	830	30.55%	1,057	38.90%	2,717
Turner	2,605	61.92%	1,602	38.08%	1,003	23.84%	4,207
Union	4,885	65.17%	2,611	34.83%	2,274	30.34%	7,496
Walworth	1,714	69.79%	742	30.21%	972	39.58%	2,456
Yankton	4,868	49.03%	5,060	50.97%	-192	-1.93%	9,928
Ziebach	353	46.69%	403	53.31%	-50	-6.61%	756
Totals	207,640	57.45%	153,789	42.55%	53,851	14.90%	361,429

==== Counties that flipped from Democratic to Republican ====
- Aurora (largest city: Plankinton)
- Beadle (largest city: Huron)
- Bennett (largest city: Martin)
- Bon Homme (largest city: Springfield)
- Brule (largest city: Chamberlain)
- Clark (largest city: Clark)
- Corson (largest city: McLaughlin)
- Deuel (largest city: Clear Lake)
- Grant (largest city: Milbank)
- Jerauld (largest city: Wessington Springs)
- Kingsbury (largest city: De Smet)
- Lake (largest city: Madison)
- Mellette (largest city: White River)
- Miner (largest city: Howard)
- Minnehaha (largest city: Sioux Falls)
- Moody (largest city: Flandreau)
- Sanborn (largest city: Woonsocket)
- Spink (largest city: Redfield)
