= 2006 United States House of Representatives election in South Dakota =

- November 7, 2006
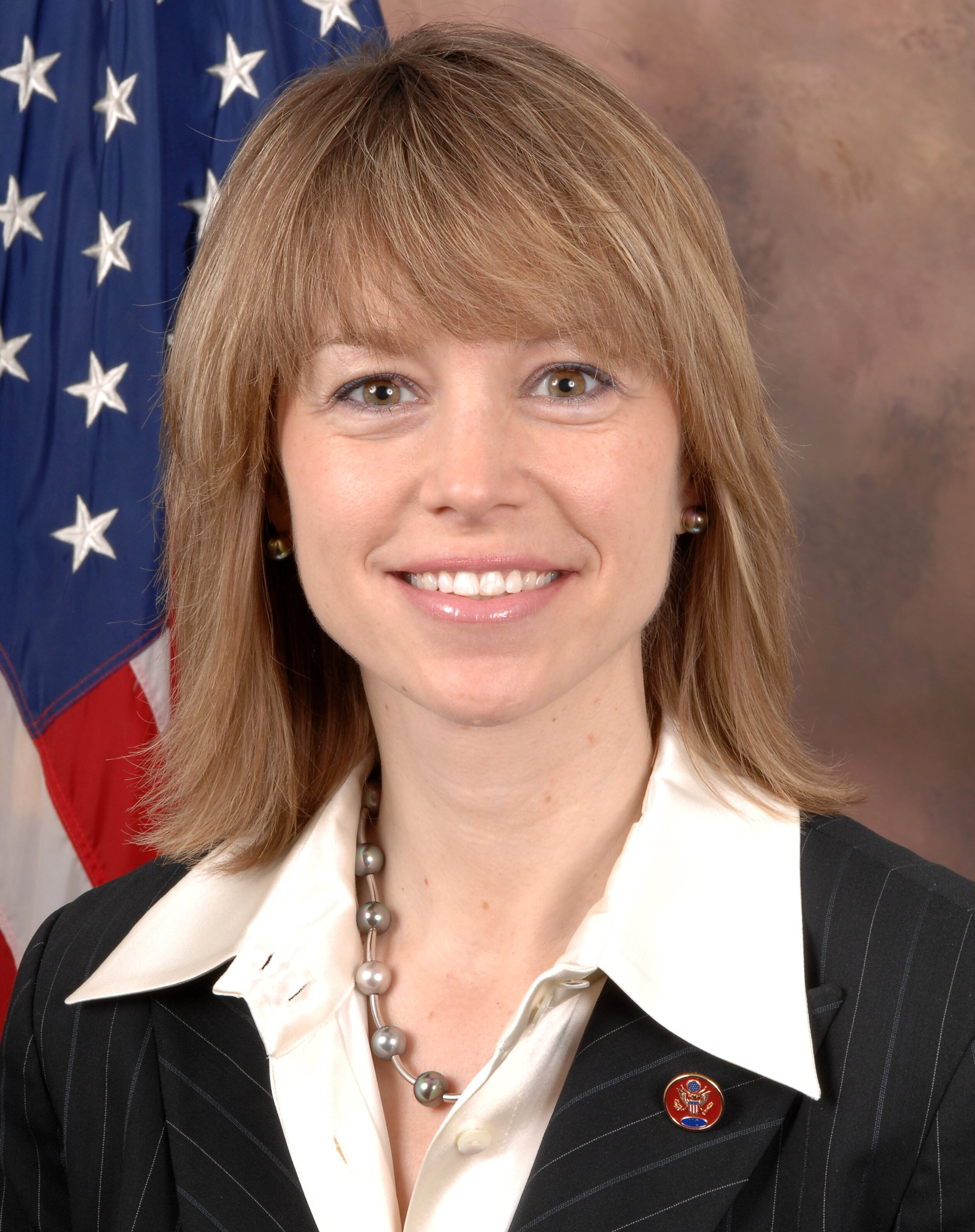

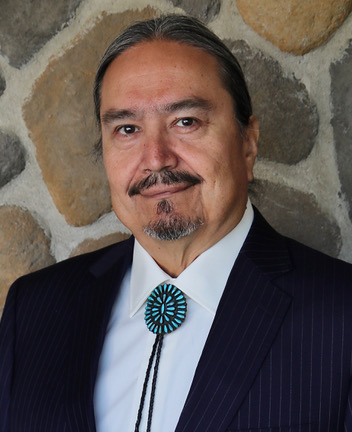
Nominee	Stephanie Herseth	Bruce Whalen
Party	Democratic	Republican
Popular vote	230,468	97,864
Percentage	69.09%	29.34%
- County results Herseth: 50–60% 60–70% 70–80% 80–90% Whalen: 50–60%
U.S. Representative before election
Stephanie Herseth
Democratic
Elected U.S. Representative
Stephanie Herseth
Democratic

The 2006 United States House of Representatives election in South Dakota took place on Tuesday, November 7, 2006. Voters selected a representative for their single At-Large district, who ran on a statewide ballot.

Democratic incumbent Stephanie Herseth was challenged by Republican nominee Chairman of the Shannon County (now known as Oglala Lakota County) Republican Party Bruce Whalen. Neither candidate was opposed in the June 6, 2006 primary. George W. Bush won in this district 60% to 38% over John Kerry in 2004.

Herseth won all but one county in the state, that being Douglas County.

== General election ==
=== Predictions ===
Source	Ranking	As of
The Cook Political Report	Safe D	November 6, 2006
Rothenberg	Safe D	November 6, 2006
Sabato's Crystal Ball	Safe D	November 6, 2006
Real Clear Politics	Safe D	November 7, 2006
CQ Politics	Safe D	November 7, 2006

=== Results ===
Despite the strong performance of Republicans in many of the state elections held that year, including Incumbent Republican Governor Mike Rounds's 62%-36% victory over former state Representative Jack Billion, Herseth was nevertheless reelected by a landslide margin.

South Dakota's at-large congressional district election, 2006
Party	Candidate	Votes	%
Democratic	Stephanie Herseth (incumbent)	230,468	69.09%
Republican	Bruce W. Whalen	97,864	29.34%
Libertarian	Larry Rudebusch	5,230	1.57%
Total votes		333,562	100.00%
Democratic hold			

=== Counties that flipped from Republican to Democratic ===
- Faulk (largest city: Faulkton)
- McPherson (largest city: Eureka)
- Potter (largest city: Gettysburg)
- Walworth (largest city: Mobridge)
- Campbell (largest city: Herreid)
- Haakon (largest city: Philip)
- Harding (largest city: Buffalo)
- Jones (largest city: Murdo)
- Butte (largest city: Belle Fourche)
- Perkins (largest city: Belle Fourche)
- Meade (largest city: Sturgis)
- Fall River (largest city: Hot Springs)
- Lawrence (largest city: Spearfish)
- Pennington (largest city: Rapid City)
- Custer (largest city: Custer)
- Tripp (largest city: Winner)
- Gregory (largest city: Gregory)
- Hanson (largest city: Alexandria)
- Hutchinson (largest city: Parkston)
- Lincoln (largest city: Sioux Falls)
- Sully (largest city: Onida)
- Hughes (largest city: Pierre)
- Hyde (largest city: Highmore)
- Hamlin (largest city: Estelline)
