= 2008 United States House of Representatives election in South Dakota =

- November 4, 2008
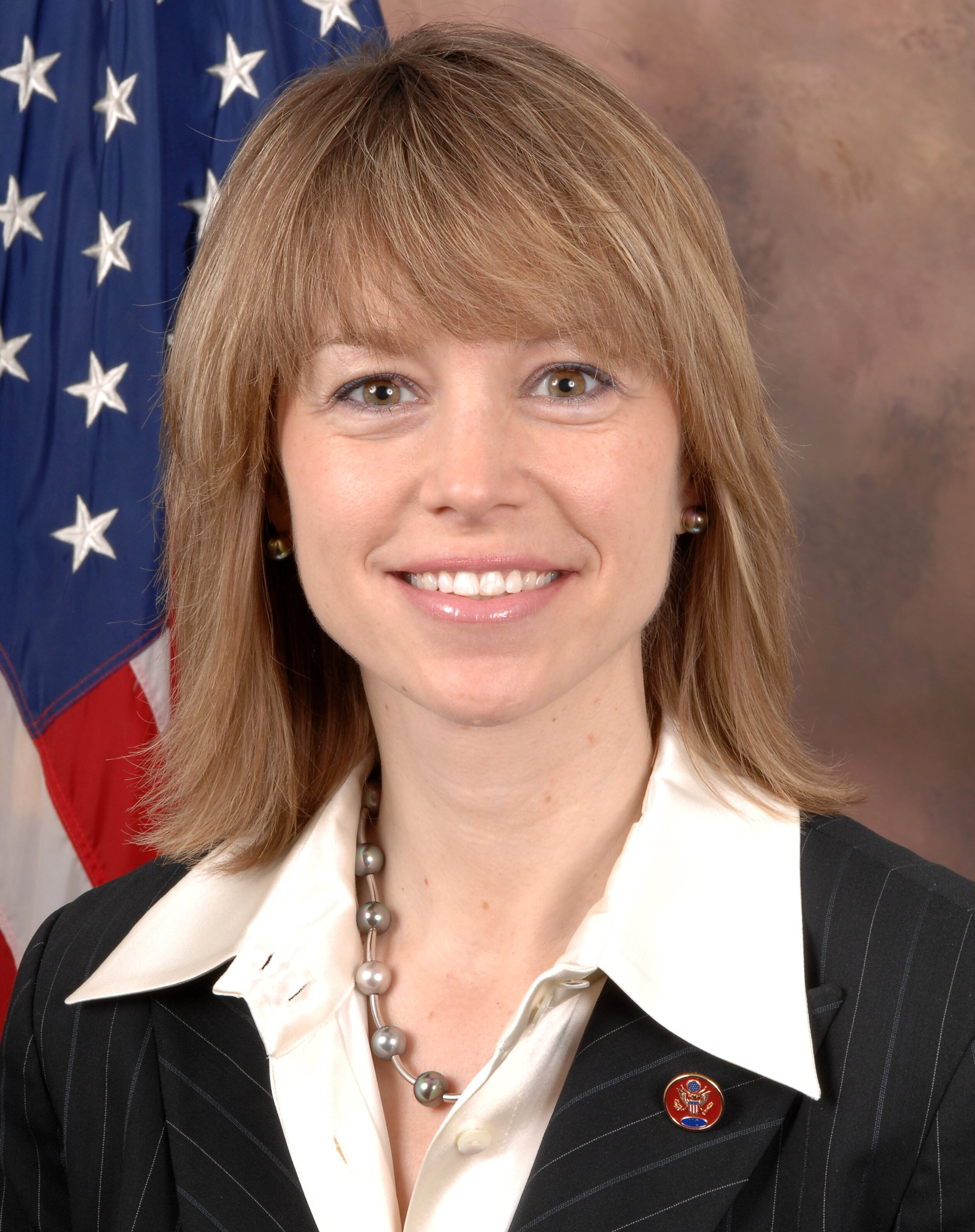

Nominee	Stephanie Herseth Sandlin	Chris Lein
Party	Democratic	Republican
Popular vote	256,041	122,966
Percentage	67.56%	32.44%
- Herseth Sandlin: 50–60% 60–70% 70–80% 80–90% >90% Lein: 50–60% 60–70% 70–80% Tie: 50%
U.S. Representative before election
Stephanie Herseth Sandlin
Democratic
Elected U.S. Representative
Stephanie Herseth Sandlin
Democratic

The 2008 United States House of Representatives election in South Dakota took place on Tuesday, November 4, 2008. Voters selected a representative for their single at-large district, who ran on a statewide ballot.

Democratic incumbent Stephanie Herseth Sandlin was challenged by the Republican nominee, businessman and attorney Chris Lien. Neither candidate was opposed in the June 3, 2008 primary. CQ Politics forecasted this race as 'Safe Democrat'. George W. Bush won in this district 60% to 38% for John Kerry in 2004.

As of 2026, this election, along with the simultaneous Senate race, is the last time a Democrat won a statewide election in South Dakota. This also the last time either party won every county in the state in a contested race.

== General election ==
=== Predictions ===
Source	Ranking	As of
The Cook Political Report	Safe D	November 6, 2008
Rothenberg	Safe D	November 2, 2008
Sabato's Crystal Ball	Safe D	November 6, 2008
Real Clear Politics	Safe D	November 7, 2008
CQ Politics	Safe D	November 6, 2008

=== Results ===
South Dakota's at-large congressional district election, 2008
Party	Candidate	Votes	%
Democratic	Stephanie Herseth Sandlin (incumbent)	256,041	67.56%
Republican	Chris Lien	122,966	32.44%
Total votes		379,007	100.00%
Democratic hold			

==== Counties that flipped from Republican to Democratic ====
- Douglas (largest city: Armour)

== See also ==
- South Dakota's at-large congressional district
