= Dusty Johnson =

American politician (born 1976)

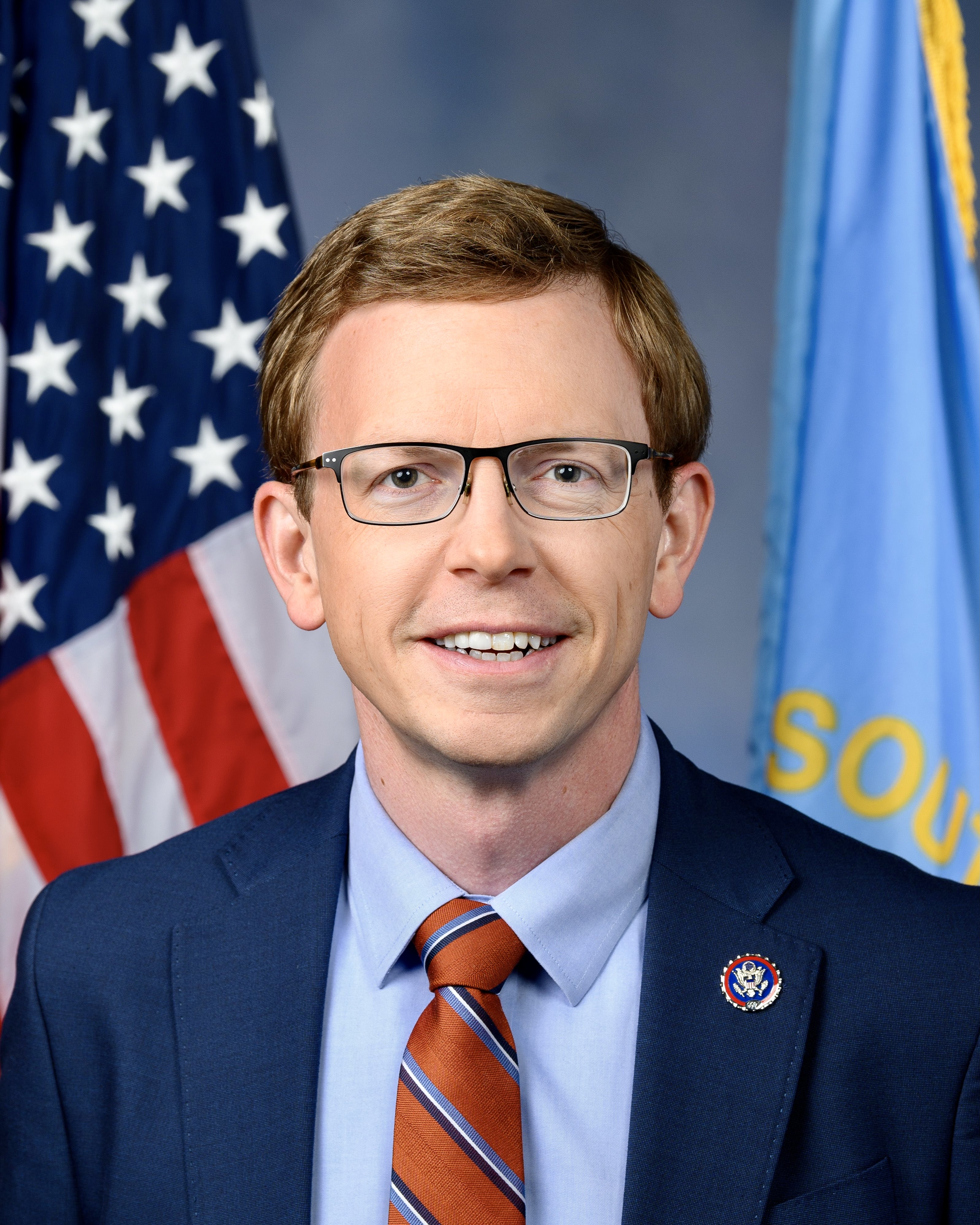
- Official portrait, 2021

Member of the U.S. House of Representatives from South Dakota's at-large district
- Incumbent
- Assumed office January 3, 2019
- Preceded by: Kristi Noem

Chief of Staff to the Governor of South Dakota
- In office January 8, 2011 – November 7, 2014
- Governor: Dennis Daugaard
- Preceded by: Neil Fulton
- Succeeded by: Tony Venhuizen

Member of the South Dakota Public Utilities Commission
- In office January 2005 – January 8, 2011
- Preceded by: James A. Burg
- Succeeded by: Chris Nelson

Personal details
- Born: Dustin Michael Johnson; September 30, 1976 (age 50) Pierre, South Dakota, U.S.
- Party: Republican
- Spouse: Jacquelyn Dice (m. 1999)
- Children: 3
- Education: University of South Dakota (BA); University of Kansas (MPA)
- Website: House website

Dustin Michael Johnson (born September 30, 1976) is an American politician serving as the U.S. representative for South Dakota's at-large congressional district since 2019. A member of the Republican Party, he served as South Dakota Public Utilities Commissioner from 2005 to 2011, when he was appointed chief of staff to Governor Dennis Daugaard, a position he held until 2014. Between his state political career and congressional service, Johnson was the vice-president of Vantage Point Solutions in Mitchell, South Dakota.

A moderate Republican, Johnson is a member of the centrist Problem Solvers Caucus. During his tenure he has voted to revoke Donald Trump's declaration of a national emergency at the southern border, keep Liz Cheney as the Republican Conference Chair, and joined all Democrats in voting to approve legislation to establish the January 6 commission meant to investigate the storming of the U.S. Capitol.

Johnson ran for Governor of South Dakota in 2026, placing third in the Republican primary and failing to advance to a runoff.

== Early life and education ==
Johnson was born in Pierre, South Dakota. He graduated from T.F. Riggs High School in 1995. He graduated from the University of South Dakota with Omicron Delta Kappa honors with a BA in political science in 1999, and was a member of fraternity Phi Delta Theta. He earned his MPA from the University of Kansas in 2002. In 1998, Johnson was named a Truman Scholar. As a Truman Scholar, he worked for the U.S. Department of Agriculture in Washington, D.C. In 2003, Johnson worked as a senior policy advisor for then-South Dakota governor Mike Rounds.

== State government career ==
=== Public Utilities Commission (2004–2011) ===
In 2004, Johnson was elected to the South Dakota Public Utilities Commission. He was the youngest utilities commissioner in the nation. In 2010, he won reelection. Johnson also served on the National Association of Regulatory Utility Commissioners' executive board. He was appointed chair of the South Dakota Public Utilities Commission in 2007, and he served in that capacity until his resignation in 2011. In 2010, he led a South Dakota delegation that included then-Governor Rounds and state regulators that met with FCC Commissioners about concerns over the FCC's National Broadband Plan and its impact on small and rural providers in South Dakota.

=== Daugaard administration (2011–2014) ===
In 2011, he resigned his PUC position to become Governor Dennis Daugaard's chief of staff, a position he held for four years. As chief operating officer for much of state government, he supervised cabinet secretaries, policy advisors and many of Daugaard's projects and initiatives.

== Private sector career (2014–2018) ==
In 2014, Johnson resigned as chief of staff, leaving the public sector to work for Vantage Point Solutions in Mitchell, South Dakota. Johnson was succeeded as chief of staff by Daugaard's son-in-law, fellow Truman Scholar Tony Venhuizen. Johnson resigned his position with Vantage Point Solutions in 2018 upon his accession to Congress.

== U.S. House of Representatives ==
=== Elections ===
==== 2018 ====
On November 15, 2016, Johnson announced his candidacy for U.S. Representative for South Dakota's at-large congressional district. The announcement came shortly after Kristi Noem announced she would not seek reelection to Congress in order to run in the 2018 South Dakota gubernatorial election. Johnson defeated Secretary of State of South Dakota Shantel Krebs and state senator Neal Tapio in the June 5 Republican primary. He defeated Democratic nominee Tim Bjorkman, a retired circuit court judge, and two minor candidates in the November general election.

==== 2020 ====
2020 GOP Primary results by county Johnson: 50–60%; 60–70%; 70–80%; 80–90%; May: 50–60%; 60–70%; 70–80%

On February 19, 2020, Johnson announced his bid for reelection to the House. On February 4, 2020, former state representative Liz Marty May announced she would challenge Johnson in the Republican primary. On June 2, 2020, President Donald Trump endorsed Johnson, writing on Twitter that Johnson is a "phenomenal advocate for the people of South Dakota."

Two Democrats, Brian Wirth of Dell Rapids and Whitney Raver of Custer, announced their candidacy for the House seat, but neither received the required number of signatures to make the ballot. According to state party chairman Randy Seiler, Wirth and Raver's canvassing efforts were hampered by the COVID-19 pandemic. On June 2, Johnson won the Republican primary, 77%–23%. He won the general election with 81% of the vote.

==== 2022 ====
2022 GOP primary results by county Johnson: 50–60%; 60–70%; 70–80%; Howard: 50–60%; 60–70%

On October 12, 2021, State Representative Taffy Howard announced that she would challenge Johnson in the Republican primary. On June 7, 2022, Johnson defeated Howard, 59%–41%.

Johnson went on to defeat Libertarian nominee Collin Duprel 77.4%–22.6%.

==== 2024 ====
Johnson won the Republican primary unopposed. He went on to face Democrat Sheryl Johnson, who he defeated 72%–28%.

== 2026 gubernatorial campaign ==
2026 GOP primary results by county Johnson: 20–30%; 30–40%; Doeden: 20–30%; 30–40%; 40–50%; Rhoden: 20–30%; 30–40%; 40–50%; Hansen: 20–30%; 30–40%; 40–50%

On June 30, 2025, Johnson announced that he would run for governor of South Dakota in 2026. He placing third in the Republican primary with 23% of the vote, failing to advance to a runoff.

== Political positions ==
Johnson was sworn into the U.S. House of Representatives on January 3, 2019, and joined the Problem Solvers Caucus soon after.

=== Antitrust ===
In 2022, Johnson was one of 39 Republicans to vote for the Merger Filing Fee Modernization Act of 2022, an antitrust package that would crack down on corporations for anti-competitive behavior.

=== Border wall ===
On March 26, 2019, Johnson was one of 14 Republicans to vote with all House Democrats to override President Trump's veto of a measure revoking Trump's declaration of a national emergency at the southern border.

=== 2020 Presidential election ===
Johnson did not join the majority of Republican members of Congress who signed an amicus brief in support of Texas v. Pennsylvania, a lawsuit filed at the United States Supreme Court contesting the results of the 2020 presidential election.

Johnson voted to certify both Arizona's and Pennsylvania's results in the 2021 United States Electoral College vote count.

On May 19, 2021, Johnson was one of 35 Republicans who joined all Democrats in voting to approve legislation to establish the January 6, 2021 commission meant to investigate the storming of the U.S. Capitol.

=== LGBT Rights ===
In 2022, Johnson voted against the Respect for Marriage Act, a landmark bipartisan bill which codified same-sex marriage and interracial marriage into law, alongside South Dakota's two senators, John Thune and Mike Rounds. Johnson said the bill did not provide sufficient protections for "individuals or institutions that have sincerely-held 'religious beliefs and moral convictions' about marriage", stating that “If Congress is going to codify the Supreme Court’s gay marriage decision, the religious protections need to be air tight, and they weren’t.” The bill explicitly exempted private businesses and religious institutions. Speaking during his 2022 reelection campaign, Johnson said the bill was a "political-show [bill]" and that "These things are the business of the states. In fact, the full faith and credit provision of the constitution says that if any state has those gay marriages that other states need to recognize them."

=== Liz Cheney ===
During the second vote to oust Liz Cheney, Johnson was among the few House Republicans who voted to keep her as conference chair.

=== Committee assignments ===
- Committee on Agriculture
  - Subcommittee on Nutrition, Oversight, and Department Operations
  - Subcommittee on Commodity Exchanges, Energy, and Credit
- Committee on Transportation and Infrastructure
  - Subcommittee on Aviation
  - Subcommittee on Highways and Transit
  - Subcommittee on Railroads, Pipelines, and Hazardous Materials
- Select Committee on the Strategic Competition Between the United States and the Chinese Communist Party

=== Caucus memberships ===
- Republican Main Street Partnership (past chair)
- Problem Solvers Caucus
- Climate Solutions Caucus
- Congressional Coalition on Adoption
- Congressional Motorcycle Caucus
- Rare Disease Caucus
- Congressional Western Caucus

== Electoral history ==
2018 Republican primary results
Party	Candidate	Votes	%
Republican	Dusty Johnson	47,032	46.8
Republican	Shantel Krebs	29,442	29.3
Republican	Neal Tapio	23,980	24.0
Total votes		100,454	100

South Dakota's at-large congressional district, 2018
Party	Candidate	Votes	%	±%
Republican	Dusty Johnson	202,446	60.35%	−3.75%
Democratic	Tim Bjorkman	120,816	36.01%	+0.11%
Independent	Ron Wieczorek	7,313	2.18%	N/A
Libertarian	George D. Hendrickson	4,896	1.46%	N/A
Total votes		335,471	100.0%	N/A
Republican hold				

2020 Republican primary results
Party	Candidate	Votes	%
Republican	Dusty Johnson (incumbent)	71,496	76.7
Republican	Liz Marty May	21,779	23.3
Total votes		93,275	100

South Dakota's at-large congressional district, 2020
Party	Candidate	Votes	%	±%
Republican	Dusty Johnson (incumbent)	321,984	80.96%	+20.61%
Libertarian	Randy Luallin	75,748	19.04%	+17.58%
Total votes		397,732	100.0%	
Republican hold				

2022 Republican primary results
Party	Candidate	Votes	%
Republican	Dusty Johnson (incumbent)	70,728	59.2
Republican	Taffy Howard	48,645	40.8
Total votes		119,373	100

South Dakota's at-large congressional district, 2022
Party	Candidate	Votes	%	±%
Republican	Dusty Johnson (incumbent)	253,821	77.42%	–3.54%
Libertarian	Collin Duprel	74,020	22.58%	+3.54%
Total votes		327,841	100.0%	
Republican hold				

South Dakota's at-large congressional district, 2024
Party	Candidate	Votes	%	±%
Republican	Dusty Johnson (incumbent)	303,630	72.04%	–5.38%
Democratic	Sheryl Johnson	117,818	27.96%	N/A
Total votes		421,448	100.0%	
Republican hold				

Republican primary results
Party	Candidate	Votes	%
Republican	Toby Doeden	41,712	30.6
Republican	Larry Rhoden (incumbent)	34,321	25.2
Republican	Dusty Johnson	31,856	23.4
Republican	Jon Hansen	28,341	20.8
Total votes		136,230	100.0

== Personal life ==
Johnson has been actively involved as a state advisor for South Dakota Teen Age Republicans (TARs) and its Black Hills camp leader. He has served on the board of directors for the W.O. Farber Fund, Abbott House, and on the South Dakota Attorney General's Open Government Task Force. Johnson has served as an adjunct professor at Dakota Wesleyan University.

U.S. House of Representatives
Preceded by Kristi Noem	Member of the U.S. House of Representatives from South Dakota's at-large congressional district 2019–present	Incumbent
Party political offices
Preceded by Don Bacon; Mike Bost; Pete Stauber	Chair of the Republican Main Street Caucus; 2023–2025	Succeeded by Mike Flood
U.S. order of precedence (ceremonial)
Preceded by Chrissy Houlahan	United States representatives by seniority 209th	Succeeded by John Joyce
