= Taffy Howard =

American politician (born 1968)

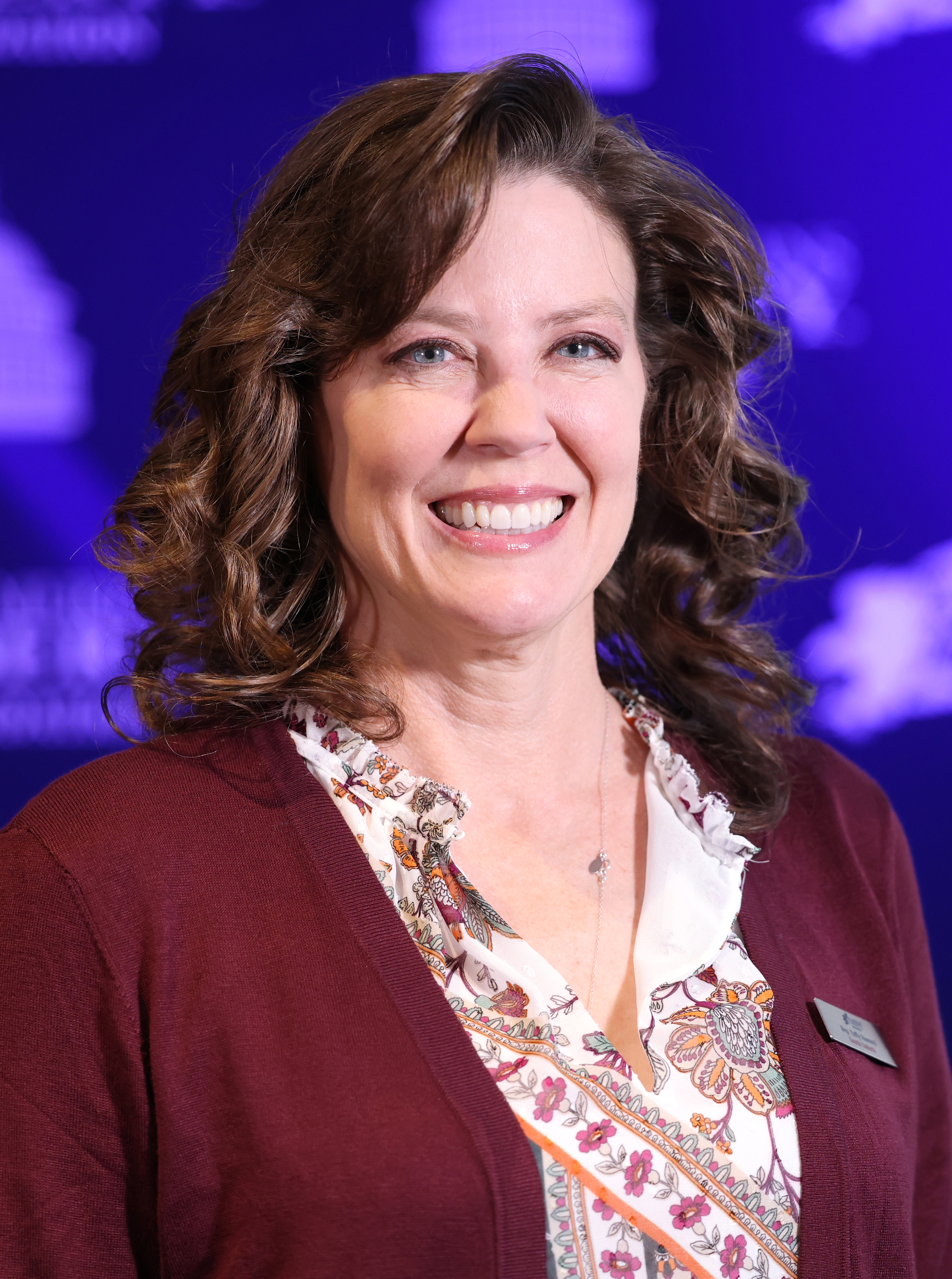
- Howard in 2024

Member of the South Dakota Senate from the 34th district
- Incumbent
- Assumed office January 14, 2025
- Preceded by: Michael Diedrich

Member of the South Dakota House of Representatives from the 33rd district
- In office January 10, 2017 – January 10, 2023 Serving with David Johnson, Phil Jensen
- Preceded by: Scott Craig; Jacqueline Sly
- Succeeded by: Curt Massie

Personal details
- Born: Taffy Chewning; October 3, 1968 (age 57) Decatur, Georgia, U.S.
- Party: Republican
- Spouse: Mark Howard
- Children: 2
- Education: South Dakota State University (BS)
- Website: Campaign website

Military service
- Allegiance: United States
- Branch/service: United States Air Force
- Years of service: 1989–1993

Taffy D. Howard (née Chewning) is an American politician who has served in the South Dakota Senate representing the 34th district as a Republican since 2025. She previously served in the South Dakota House of Representatives, representing the 33rd district from 2017 to 2023. She unsuccessfully ran for the U.S. House to represent South Dakota's at-large congressional district in 2022.

== Early life and education ==
Howard was born in Decatur, Georgia. Raised in a military family, she moved to South Dakota as a teenager and graduated from Lincoln High School in Sioux Falls. She earned a Bachelor of Science degree in mathematics from the South Dakota State University.

== Career ==
Howard served as an officer in the United States Air Force from 1990 to 1994. She was elected to the South Dakota House of Representatives in November 2016 and assumed office on January 10, 2017. Howard also serves as vice chair of the House Committee on Appropriations.

Amid the COVID-19 pandemic in South Dakota, Howard announced her intention to introduce legislation that would prevent private businesses from making vaccination mandatory for employees. In 2022, Howard supported legislation that would make it legal for doctors to prescribe ivermectin to treat COVID-19. There was no evidence to indicate that the drug was effective in treating COVID and there was nothing that prohibited doctors from prescribing it.

=== 2022 congressional election ===
On August 2, 2021, Howard filed a statement of organization with the Federal Elections Commission to form an exploratory committee for the 2022 United States House of Representatives election in South Dakota. On October 12, 2021, Howard officially announced that she would challenge U.S. Representative Dusty Johnson in the Republican primary. On June 7, 2021, Johnson defeated Howard, 59%–41%.

== Electoral history ==
- In November 2020, Howard was re-elected with 7,902 votes along with Phil Jensen, who received 10,251 votes. In June 2020, Howard received 2,831 votes and Phil Jensen received 2,297 votes to win the primary election defeating Melanie Torno who received 1,620 votes.
- In November 2018, Howard was re-elected with 5,662 votes along with David Johnson who received 6,094 votes, they defeated Lills Jarding who received 3,537 votes and Nick Reid who received 2,316 votes. In June 2018, Howard received 2,183 votes along with Johnson who received 2,215 votes and they advanced to the general election after defeating Melanie Torno who received 1,212 votes.
- In November 2016, Howard was elected to the South Dakota House of Representatives with 7,018 votes along with Johnson, who received 8,245 votes and they defeated Jim Hadd who received 3,226 votes and Ethan Marsland who received 2,777 votes. In June 2016, Howard received 1,792 votes and advanced from the primary along with Johnson, who received 2,235 votes and they defeated Mike Buckingham who received 1,099 votes.
