= Phil Jensen =

American politician (born 1952)

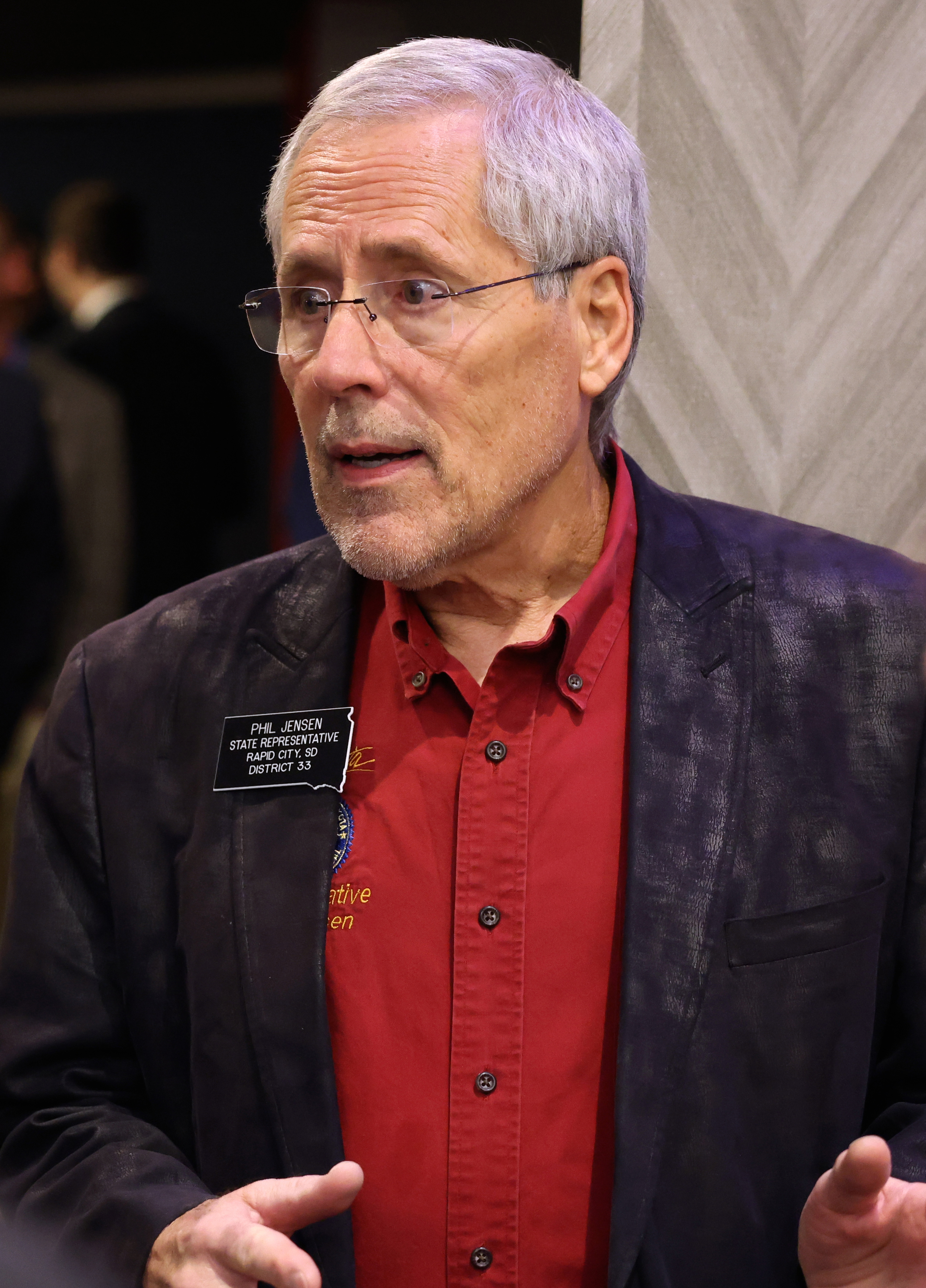
- Jensen at the 2024 Hazlitt Summit hosted by Young Americans for Liberty Foundation

Member of the South Dakota House of Representatives from the 33rd district
- Incumbent
- Assumed office January 12, 2021 Serving with Curt Massie

Member of the South Dakota Senate from the 33rd district
- In office January 8, 2013 – January 12, 2021
- Preceded by: Elizabeth Kraus
- Succeeded by: David Johnson

Member of the South Dakota House of Representatives from the 33rd district
- In office January 2009 – January 8, 2013 Serving with Jacqueline Sly (2009–2013)
- Succeeded by: Scott Craig

Personal details
- Born: July 24, 1952 (age 73) Wichita, Kansas
- Party: Republican
- Spouse: Janet Jensen
- Website: philjensen.org

Phil Jensen (born July 24, 1952), is an American politician from Pennington County, South Dakota who is a current member of the South Dakota House of Representatives and has served as a Republican member of the South Dakota Senate representing District 33 from 2013 to 2021. Jensen served consecutively in the South Dakota Legislature from January 2009 until January 8, 2013 in the South Dakota House of Representatives District 33 seat. He currently serves as the Chairman of the South Dakota Freedom Caucus. He supplements his legislative income as a cookware dealer.

== Political controversies and disputes ==
Jensen attracted attention nationally for his assertion in an interview with the Rapid City Journal that the free market, not government, should be allowed to decide whether or not racial discrimination is acceptable, and that his SB 128 introduced in 2013, which would allow discrimination by business owners, would serve to protect "the constitutional right to free association, the right to free speech and private property rights." (The bill failed, having drawn such reactions as fellow Republican State Senator Mark Kirkeby terming it "a mean, nasty, hateful, vindictive bill.") Jensen's stance was repudiated by Republican Governor Dennis Daugaard, who issued a press release stating, "I found his comments to be completely out of line with South Dakota values. I don't agree with him and I haven't talked to anyone who does. Jensen is uncertain about the assertion that he is South Dakota's most conservative politician, describing himself as simply a true Reagan conservative; but asserts that "too many" members of his own party are Republicans In Name Only.

In 2022, it emerged that Jensen had been a member of the far-right militia group, the Oath Keepers.

In 2025, Jensen purposed a bill which would have directed the South Dakota Department of Education to withhold money from the Huron School District. Jensen explained to the Argus Leader that the bill was intended to get district leaders to testify in Pierre to explain why "it is allowing boys to go into girls' bathrooms." The bill received statewide condemnation including from fellow Republican lawmakers, leading to Jensen being demoted as Vice Chair of the House Education Committee and withdrawing the bill less than 24 hours.

== Elections ==
=== South Dakota House of Representatives ===
- 2008 When House District 33 incumbent Republican Representative Michael Buckingham ran for South Dakota Senate and incumbent Republican Representative Don Van Etten was term limited and left the Legislature, Jensen ran in the four-way June 3, 2008 Republican Primary and placed second with 830 votes (28.2%), in the four-way November 4, 2008 General election fellow Republican nominee Jacqueline Sly took the first seat and Jensen took the second seat with 4,926 votes (31.4%) ahead of Democratic nominees Jeff Nelson (who had run for the seat in 2006) and Kimberly Henderson.
- 2010 Jensen and incumbent Representative Sly were unopposed for both the June 8, 2010 Republican Primary and the November 2, 2010 General election, where Jensen took the first seat with 4,920 votes (56.62%) and Representative Sly took the second seat.

=== South Dakota Senate ===
- 2012 When incumbent Senate District 33 Republican Senator Elizabeth Kraus left the Legislature and left the District 33 seat open, Jensen ran in the June 5, 2012 Republican Primary and placed first with 1,128 votes (57.6%) against former Representative Michael Buckingham who had run for the seat in 2008; Jensen won the November 6, 2012 General election with 5,722 votes (57.4%) against Democratic nominee Matt McGrath.

=== South Dakota House of Representatives ===
- In November 2020, Jensen was elected to the South Dakota House of Representatives with 10,251 votes along with Taffy Howard who received 7,902 votes, they were uncontested. In June 2020, Johnson received 2,297 and Taffy Howard received 2,831 votes to win the primary election defeating Melanie Torno who received 1,620 votes.
