= South Dakota House Bill 1008 =

South Dakota House Bill 1008, also known as House Bill 1008, HB 1008, and the Bathroom Bill, was a bill passed by the South Dakota Legislature in 2016 and vetoed by Governor of South Dakota Dennis Daugaard. The purpose of the bill was to restrict bathroom and locker room use by transgender students to facilities that matched their sex assigned at birth, not their gender identity. It was the first such bathroom bill to be passed in a state legislature in the U.S. and sparked a chain of similar bills across the nation. HB 1008 was opposed by several LGBT rights organizations, such as the HRC, GLSEN, and ACLU.

== Content ==
The bill's purpose was to require transgender students in public schools to use bathroom, shower, and locker facilities that matched their "chromosomes and anatomy at birth". It would have also restricted their access to facilities that matched their gender identity, while requiring school districts to provide adequate accommodations for transgender students if requested by that student.

== Legislative process ==
HB 1008 was sponsored by Representative Fred Deutsch, who was backed by Representatives Scott Craig, Al Novstrup, Jeff Partridge, Lance Russell, Lee Schoenbeck, Mike Verchio, and Larry Zikmund; and Senators Brock Greenfield, Terri Haverly, Ried Holien, Betty Olson, and Ernie Otten.

The bill was first proposed to the South Dakota House of Representatives on January 12, 2016. It was then referred to the House State Affairs Committee on January 13, and on January 25, it was amended and passed 10–3, at which point it was sent back to the House. The House amended the bill to include the language "anatomy as identified at birth" and passed it 58–10 on January 27. HB 1008 was passed in the South Dakota Senate 20–15 on February 16 and was sent to the South Dakota Governor Dennis Daugaard's office on February 23.

Prior to his decision, Daugaard initially said that he had never knowingly met a transgender person and felt he did not need to before making a decision on whether or not to sign the bill into law. He later agreed to meet with transgender people on February 23, which he said "put a human face" to the bill. Daugaard vetoed the bill on March 2, stating that the bill did not solve any pressing issues in the state, and that decisions should be made on a local level. A veto override in the House failed 36-29 the next day, which Deutsch did not support, in favor of letting the bill die for passage at another time. Deutsch has said that he would like to revive the bill for the 2017 legislative session.

== Reaction ==
=== Support ===
HB 1008 was supported by several lawmakers and organizations, including The Heritage Foundation, Family Heritage Alliance Action, and the Roman Catholic bishops of South Dakota, saying that the bill protected the privacy of children. Senator David Omdahl pledged support for the bill, saying he believed it would protect child innocence, and calling transgender people "twisted".

=== Criticism ===
The bill was opposed by several LGBT rights and children's organizations and celebrities, who said the bill violated transgender students' right to conform to their gender identity. Among these organizations were the American Academy of Pediatrics, Human Rights Campaign, Gay, Lesbian and Straight Education Network, and American Civil Liberties Union. Laverne Cox and Caitlyn Jenner, two transgender activists, were among the celebrities who opposed the measure. Several tourists threatened to boycott the state over social media — South Dakota brings in approximately $3.8 billion in tourism revenue annually. Critics of the bill also said that it violated Title IX of the Education Amendments of 1972, which protects transgender students from public school discrimination, and that passing the bill would have meant South Dakota losing federal funding.

== See also ==
- LGBT rights in South Dakota
- Public Facilities Privacy & Security Act
- Sex reassignment surgery (male-to-female)
