= Pap Madison Cabin =

Historic site in South Dakota, USA

- Madison, Pap, Cabin
- Formerly listed on the U.S. National Register of Historic Places
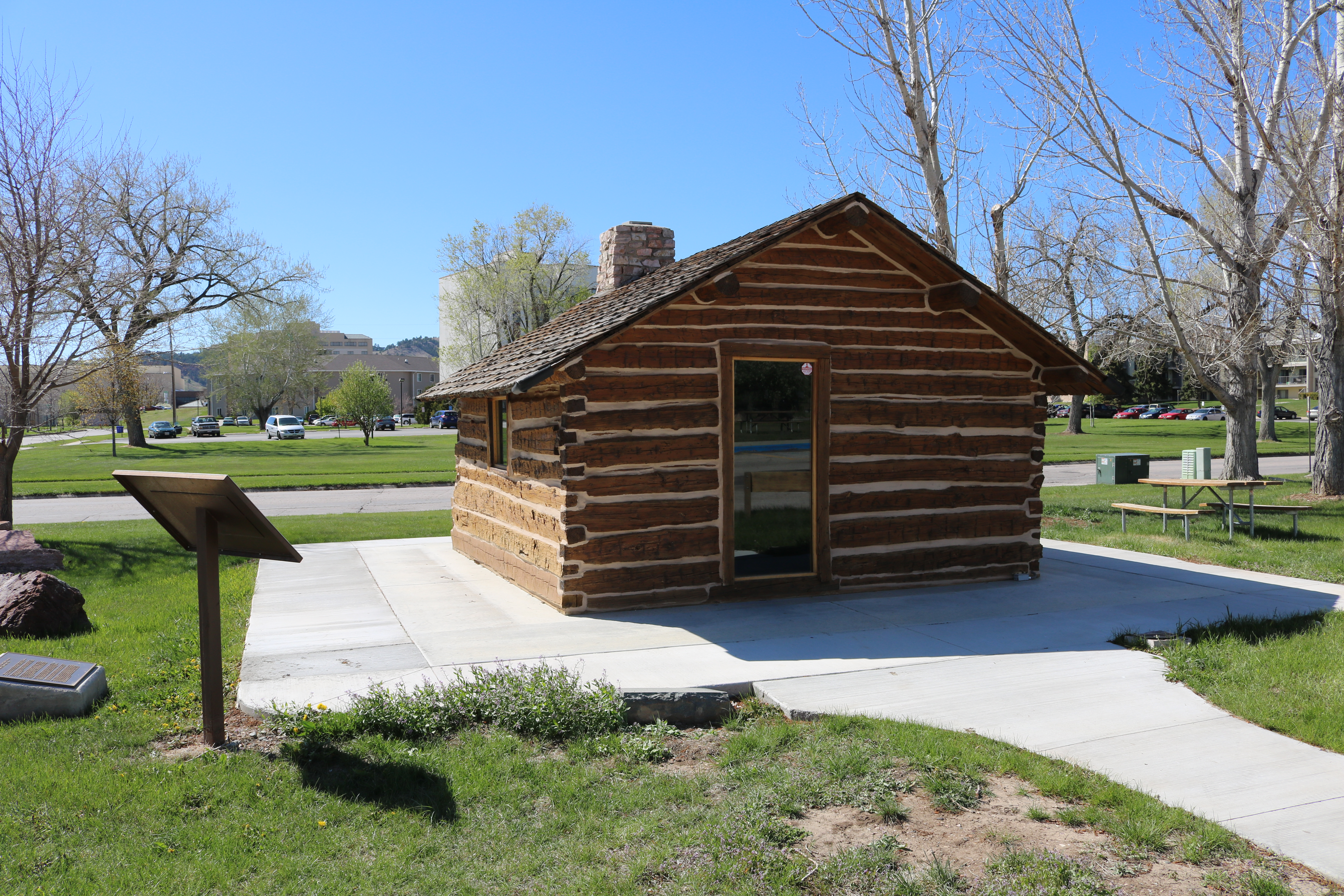

- Location within South Dakota Location within the United States
- Interactive map showing the location of Pap Madison Cabin
- Location: Bounded by W. Main St., St. Joseph St. & West Blvd., Rapid City, South Dakota
- Coordinates: 44°05′02″N 103°14′17″W
- Area: less than one acre
- Built: 1876
- Architect: Pap Madison
- NRHP reference No.: 08000054

Significant dates
- Added to NRHP: February 19, 2008
- Removed from NRHP: December 12, 2017

The Pap Madison Cabin is a historic log cabin located in Rapid City, South Dakota, near The Journey Museum and Learning Center. It is the oldest Euro-American building in the Black Hills area. The cabin was built in 1876 by pioneer Rufus 'Pap' Madison using cottonwood found alongside the banks of the nearby Rapid Creek. Madison stayed in the house from its completion until 1889, when he sold the land to Rapid City's founder, John Brennan. Brennan gave the cottage to the city in 1926.

== Description ==
The cabin is a hand-hewn squared cabin featuring a gable roof covered in wooden shingles and an exterior stone chimney which was added in 1926 by the Fortnightly club. The cabin offers 225 square feet of living space. It originally had a dirt floor and was heated with a wood-burning cook stove, but the wood-burning stove has since been replaced with a fireplace. For waterproofing and heat preservation, gaps between the logs were stuffed with sticks, moss, grass, and wood chips and then sealed with mud.

== Restorations ==
In 1926 Alice Gossage, the owner of the Rapid City Journal, spearheaded an effort to repair and move the cabin to Halley Park, just west of downtown Rapid City.

The Minnilusa Pioneer's Association donated local artifacts for display in the cabin, thus creating the first history museum in the Black Hills. The United States Department of the Interior's Sioux Indian Museum shared the site with the Minnilusa Pioneers.

In 2012, the cabin was lifted from its foundation and moved to a location in front of The Journey Museum.

== Status on the National Register ==
In 2017, the cabin was removed from the National Register of Historic Places and added to the South Dakota State Register of Historic Places. The cabin, which was moved from its location at Halley Park to the Journey Museum, had alterations done to its foundation to make the interior of the building more visible. These alterations were found to not meet the criteria of the National Register.
