= Dan Dryden =

American politician

Member of the South Dakota House of Representatives from the 34th district
- In office January 11, 2011 – August 30, 2016
- Preceded by: Ed McLaughlin
- Succeeded by: Craig Tieszen

Personal details
- Born: July 12, 1944 Hot Springs, South Dakota, U.S.
- Died: August 30, 2016 (aged 72) Rapid City, South Dakota
- Party: Republican
- Education: Black Hills State University; South Dakota State University
- Profession: School district finance officer

Robert Danny "Dan" Dryden (July 12, 1944 – August 30, 2016) was an American politician. He was a Republican member of the South Dakota House of Representatives, and represented District 34 from January 11, 2011, until his death.

== Early life and education ==
Born in Hot Springs, South Dakota, Dryden grew up on a ranch in Oelrichs, South Dakota. Dryden went to school in Olerichs, South Dakota. Dryden graduated from Black Hills State University with a bachelor's degree and then graduated from South Dakota State University with a master's degree. Dryden worked for the Rapid City Area School district as the financial officer. Dryden also taught courses in public administration and instruction law at the South Dakota State University.

== Elections ==
- 2012 Dryden and incumbent Republican Representative David Lust were unopposed for the June 5, 2012 Republican Primary; in the four-way November 6, 2012 General election incumbent Republican Representative David Lust took the first seat and Dryden took the second seat with 6,145 votes (34.18%) ahead of returning 2010 Democratic nominee John Willman and Independent candidate Mike Reardon.
- 2010 When incumbent Republican Representative Ed McLaughlin was term limited and left the Legislature leaving a District 34 seat open, Dryden ran in the three-way June 8, 2010 Republican Primary and placed second with 1,432 votes (31.43%); in the four-way November 2, 2010 General election incumbent Republican Representative David Lust took the first seat and Dryden took the second seat with 5,638 votes (34.56%) ahead of Democratic nominees Devin Oliver and John Willman.

== Death ==
Dryden died of cancer on August 30, 2016, while still in office.
