= Senator Ham =

Senator Ham may refer to:

- Arlene Ham (born 1936), South Dakota State Senate
- Levi J. Ham (1805–1887), Maine State Senate

== See also ==
- John E. Hamm (1776–1864), Ohio State Senate
