= Julie Frye-Mueller =

American politician

Member of the South Dakota Senate from the 30th district
- In office 2021–2025
- Preceded by: Lance Russell
- Succeeded by: Amber Hulse

Member of the South Dakota House of Representatives from the 30th district
- In office 2017–2021
- Preceded by: Lance Russell; Mike Verchio
- Succeeded by: Trish Ladner

Personal details
- Born: April 20, 1963 (age 63)
- Party: Republican

Julie Frye-Mueller (born April 20, 1963) is an American politician from South Dakota. A member of the Republican Party, she has been a member of the South Dakota Senate, serving since 2021. She was censured by the Senate in 2023 for harassment of a legislative staffer; she denied harassment.

Mueller was a member of the South Dakota House of Representatives from 2017 to 2021.

== Political career ==
=== State House ===
A Republican, Frye-Mueller was a member of the South Dakota House of Representatives before being elected to the state Senate.

=== State Senate ===
Frye-Mueller was elected to the state Senate as a Republican in 2020, defeating Libertarian challenger Gideon Oakes (no Democrat ran in the race). She represents Senate District 30, which covers the southern Black Hills region, specifically all of Custer and Fall River counties and a rural portion of Pennington County. She replaced the previous state Senator for the district, Lance Russell, who withdrew his name from the ballot. She took office in 2021.

In the state Senate, Frye-Mueller aligned herself with a group of far-right Republicans. The group has occasionally clashed with the chamber's Republican leadership. In 2020, Frye-Mueller sponsored legislation to allow county courthouse employees to carry guns in courthouses.

In June 2022, Frye-Mueller won the Republican primary by fewer than 40 votes, defeating State Representative Tim Goodwin, a challenger who was supported by Lee Schoenbeck, the president pro tempore of the Senate. Schoenbeck also opposed Frye-Mueller's political ally and seatmate, Tom Pischke of Dell Rapids. Frye-Mueller won the general election unopposed, as no Democrat ran.

Frye-Mueller supports abolishing childhood vaccination requirements. In January 2023, Frye-Mueller introduced a bill to bar schools from requiring vaccines except for the measles, mumps and rubella vaccine.

In the 2023 legislative session, her second term in the Senate, Frye-Mueller sponsored a resolution in support of the January 6 attackers. That resolution was defeated in a unanimous committee vote. She was initially a member of the local government committee and health and human services committee. She was the lead Senate sponsor of a bill to create a severance tax for lithium mining operations in the Black Hills.

==== 2023 censure ====
On January 6, 2023, the Senate voted to form a Select Committee on Discipline and Expulsion to investigate Frye-Mueller's conduct, and to suspend her as a member of the Senate during the investigation. The suspension was prompted by an incident two days earlier in which Frye-Mueller allegedly accosted a Legislative Research Council staffer inside the state Capitol. According to the LRC staffer's account of the exchange, after Frye-Mueller and her husband entered the LRC office, Frye-Mueller aggressively confronted the LRC staffer, pointing her finger and criticizing the staffer for having her baby son vaccinated; said that vaccines made children "guinea pigs for Big Pharma"; told the staffer was she was "taking away God's gift of immunity from your son"; and falsely claimed that vaccines would cause the boy to get autism or Down syndrome, or die. In a later part of the exchange, Frye-Mueller criticized the staffer for formula-feeding her son and offered unsolicited advice on breastfeeding.

Senate leadership said that Frye-Mueller's behavior was "inappropriate" and "unprofessional" and constituted workplace harassment "related to private maternal matters." The motion to create the special committee passed on a 27–6–2 vote, and the motion to suspend Frye-Mueller passed on a 27–7 vote. Republican Senator Michael Rohl, who sponsored the motion to suspend Frye-Mueller from legislative duties, described the measure as necessary to maintain a safe working environment. The suspension stripped Frye-Mueller of all legislative power, removing her right to vote on legislation and her two committee assignments. Frye-Mueller mostly denied the allegations, and said that she was being persecuted from "advancing freedom."

After her suspension, Frye-Mueller sued legislative leadership, in federal district court in Pierre, seeking a court order to reinstate her voting rights; she named Schoenbeck as the defendant in the lawsuit. In the suit, Frye-Mueller's counsel is Steve Haugaard, a former speaker of the state House who unsuccessfully challenged Governor Kristi Noem in the June 2022 primary. A federal judge denied Frye-Mueller's request for a temporary restraining order to block the legislative disciplinary process.

Nine senators (seven Republicans and two Democrats) were appointed to the Select Committee on Discipline and Expulsion. On January 31, 2023, after a hearing in which both Frye-Mueller and the LRC staffer testified, the select committee determined that Frye-Mueller engaged in harassment, and recommended, by voice vote, that Frye-Mueller be censured by the Senate, and limited her interactions with LRC staffers. The next day, the Senate censured Frye-Mueller, and lifted her suspension, on a 33–1 vote; the sole state senator to vote "no" was Tom Pischke. After she was censured, Frye-Mueller dropped her lawsuit.

== Electoral history ==
- 2016 Republican primary election - State Representative District 30 - June 7, 2016
  - Julie Frye-Mueller (R) - 1,460
  - Tim R. Goodwin (R) - 1,508
  - Richard Mounce (R) - 1,445
  - Marilyn J. Oakes (R) - 1,207
  - Travis Lasseter (R) - 1,230
- 2016 general election - State Representative District 30 - November 8, 2016
  - Julie Frye-Mueller (R) - 8,062
  - Tim R. Goodwin (R) - 8,234
  - Kristine Ina Winter (D) - 2,915
  - Sandy Arseneault (D) - 3,397
- 2018 general election - State Representative District 30 -November 6, 2018
  - Timothy Ray Goodwin (R) - 7,433
  - Julie Frye-Mueller (R) - 7,166
  - Karen McGregor (D) - 3,152
  - Whitney Raver (D) - 2,684
- 2020
- 2022
