= Stan Adelstein =

American politician (1931–2026)

Member of the South Dakota Senate from the 32nd district
- In office January 2009 – December 2013
- Preceded by: Tom Katus
- Succeeded by: Alan Solano

Member of the South Dakota Senate from the 32nd district
- In office January 2005 – January 2007
- Preceded by: Arlene Ham
- Succeeded by: Tom Katus

Member of the South Dakota House of Representatives from the 32nd district
- In office January 2001 – January 2005 Serving with Tom Hennies
- Preceded by: Mike Wilson
- Succeeded by: Alan Hanks

Personal details
- Born: August 19, 1931 Sioux City, Iowa, U.S.
- Died: August 10, 2026 (aged 94) Rapid City, South Dakota, U.S.
- Party: Republican
- Children: 3, including Jonathan
- Education: University of Colorado, Boulder
- Website: www.stanadelstein.com

Stanford Mark Adelstein (August 19, 1931 – August 10, 2026) was an American politician from the state of South Dakota. He was a member of the Republican Party. He served in the South Dakota House of Representatives from 2001 to 2005, and in the South Dakota Senate from 2005 to 2007 and again from 2008 to 2013.

== Early life and education ==
Adelstein was born in Sioux City, Iowa on August 19, 1931. He grew up in Rapid City, South Dakota, but graduated from high school in Denver, Colorado, where there were more opportunities for him to connect with his Jewish heritage. He graduated from the University of Colorado Boulder, where he majored in civil engineering and business. He served in the United States Army, and then returned to Rapid City in 1957. His family founded the Northwestern Engineering Company, where he worked and eventually took over. He also earned a Graduate of Business Administration degree with honors from South Dakota of School Mines & Technology.

== Political career ==
Adelstein was elected to the South Dakota House of Representatives in 2000, and served four years in the House before he was elected to the South Dakota Senate in 2005. In 2006, Adelstein was defeated in the Republican primary by Elli Schwiesow. He endorsed the Democratic Party nominee, Tom Katus. In 2008, Adelstein regained the seat, defeating Katus and Schwiesow in a three-way race with Schwiesow running as an independent. Adelstein ran unopposed for the South Dakota Senate in 2010 and 2012. In December 2013, Adelstein resigned from the South Dakota Senate for health reasons.

== Personal life and death ==
Adelstein was the father of three sons, including Jonathan Adelstein.

He offered to put up $1.2 million in an attempt to keep the fossils of Sue, the largest tyrannosaurus rex ever discovered, in South Dakota. Ultimately, he was out-bid at the Sotheby's auction in New York City. Adelstein was featured in the documentary film Dinosaur 13 for these efforts.

Adelstein died on August 10, 2026, at the age of 94.

== Publications ==
In August 2019, a biography about Adelstein entitled The Question is "Why?" by Eric Steven Zimmer was published by Vantage Point Press.
