= Sioux Falls Pride =

- Abbreviation: SFP
- Founded: 2000
- Type: Non-profit
- Purpose: Fostering Growth and Furthered Visibility for the LGBTQA+ Community in South Dakota
- Headquarters: Sioux Falls, South Dakota, U.S.
- Region served: South Dakota
- Method: Community Engagement, Fundraising and Sponsorships
- President: Quinn Kathner
- Website: siouxfallspride.org
- Formerly called: The Center for Equality

Sioux Falls Pride, formerly The Center for Equality (CFE), is a non-profit organization in Sioux Falls, South Dakota, that supports and celebrates the LGBT community in South Dakota and provides resources for LGBT people and their allies. Completely volunteer-based, the Sioux Falls Pride Board of Directors and Committee work together to hosts the annual Pride event each June along with other events supporting the local LGBT community.

== Mission ==
Sioux Falls Pride's mission is "To protect and support the rights, visibility and well being of the LGBTQA+ community in South Dakota and their families." Sioux Falls Pride first took place in mid-2000 and was then hosted by the Center for Equality in Sioux Falls. The Center for Equality, now just known as Sioux Falls Pride, was the leading LGBT focused non-profit organization that provided services, support and advocated for the LGBT community of Sioux Falls and surrounding areas. Ongoing efforts continue for further visibility and community involvement through partnerships with various non-profit organizations and businesses.

== Events ==
On June 15, 2019, the Sioux Falls Pride organization held the first Pride Parade in the state of South Dakota. The parade began at 10:00am and lasted approximately 45 minutes. The parade traveled down Phillips Avenue in downtown Sioux Falls. Thousands attended this first-ever event in celebration of the LGBTQA+ community. Many downtown business owners proudly flew the rainbow flag in acknowledgement and support of this milestone event.

Also in 2019, the Sioux Falls Pride logo changed to the rainbow buffalo.

== Activism ==
SFP expressed concern regarding the passage of South Dakota House Bill 1008 in February 2016. After the bill was passed in the state legislature, representatives for SFP traveled to the State Capitol Building to rally against the bill. SFP also sent South Dakota Governor Dennis Daugaard a letter requesting a meeting in Pierre. Daugaard accepted and met with three transgender representatives from The Center, two of whom were students. Daugaard later said the meeting "helped (him) see things through their eyes".

In May 2016, SFP also backed the U.S. Department of Education and U.S. Department of Justice's decision to request Sioux Falls schools allow transgender students to use facilities that corresponded to their gender identity. A proposed Sioux Falls anti-discrimination ordinance also received support from The Center.

== See also ==
- Angie Buhl
- Gay, Lesbian & Straight Education Network
- LGBT history in South Dakota
