= Phyllis Heineman =

American politician

Member of the South Dakota Senate from the 13th district
- Incumbent
- Assumed office January 11, 2011
- Preceded by: Scott Heidepriem

Member of the South Dakota House of Representatives from the 13th district
- In office Appointed November 2, 1999 – January 2009 Serving with Mary Patterson (1999–2001); Don Hennies (2001–2003); Bill Thompson (2003–2009)
- Preceded by: Dana John Windhorst
- Succeeded by: Susy Blake

Personal details
- Born: June 28, 1948 (age 78) Mitchell, South Dakota, U.S.
- Party: Republican
- Education: South Dakota State University
- Website: whyphyllis.com

Phyllis M. Heineman (born June 28, 1948) is an American politician who was a Republican member of the South Dakota Senate representing District 13 since January 11, 2011. Heineman served non-consecutively in the South Dakota Legislature from her appointment by Governor of South Dakota Bill Janklow November 2, 1999 to fill the vacancy caused by the resignation of Dana John Windhorst until January 2009 in the South Dakota House of Representatives District 13 seat.

== Education ==
Heineman earned her BA in mathematics from South Dakota State University.

== Elections ==
- 2012 Heineman was unopposed for the June 5, 2012 Republican Primary and won the November 6, 2012 General election with 6,623 votes (60.11%) against Democratic nominee Sam Khoroosi.
- 2000 Heineman and Don Hennies were unopposed for the 2000 Republican Primary; in the three-way November 7, 2000 General election Heineman took the first seat with 5,506 votes (39.14%) and fellow Republican nominee Hennies took the second seat ahead of incumbent Democratic Representative Mary Patterson.
- 2002 Heineman and incumbent Representative Hennies were unopposed for the June 4, 2002 Republican Primary; in the four-way November 5, 2002 General election Heineman took the first seat with 6,183 votes (33.03%) and Democratic nominee Bill Thompson took the second seat ahead of incumbent Republican Representative Hennies and Democratic nominee James Jacobson.
- 2004 Heineman and former Representative Hennies won the three-way June 1, 2004 Republican Primary where Heineman placed first with 2,994 votes (61.18%); in the four-way November 2, 2004 General election Heineman took the first seat with 6,040 votes (29.19%) and incumbent Democratic Representative Thompson took the second seat ahead of former Representative Hennies and former Representative Patterson.
- 2006 Heineman ran in the June 6, 2006 Republican Primary and won the five-way November 7, 2006 General election where incumbent Democratic Representative Thompson took the first seat and Heineman took the second seat with 4,717 votes (25.88%) ahead of Democratic nominee Susan Blake, Republican nominee Richard Gourley, and Independent candidate Brian Liss.
- 2008 Term limited from remaining in the House, Heineman was unopposed to challenge incumbent District 13 Democratic Senator Scott Heidepriem in the June 3, 2008 Republican Primary, but lost the November 4, 2008 General election to Senator Heidepriem.
- 2010 When Senate District 13 incumbent Democratic Senator Heidepriem ran for Governor of South Dakota, Heineman was unopposed for the June 8, 2010 Republican Primary and won the November 2, 2010 General election with 4,856 votes (56.23%) against Democratic nominee Matt Parker.
