= Elizabeth Kraus =

American politician

Member of the South Dakota Senate from the 33rd district
- In office January 11, 2011 – January 8, 2013
- Preceded by: Dennis Schmidt
- Succeeded by: Phil Jensen

Member of the South Dakota House of Representatives from the 34th district
- In office January 14, 2003 – January 9, 2007
- Preceded by: Mike Derby; Scott G. Eccarius
- Succeeded by: David Lust

Personal details
- Born: September 30, 1943 (age 82) Nashville, Tennessee
- Party: Republican

Elizabeth Kraus (born September 30, 1943) is an American politician who served in the South Dakota House of Representatives from the 34th district from 2003 to 2007 and in the South Dakota Senate from the 33rd district from 2011 to 2013.
