= Bruce Rampelberg =

American politician

Member of the South Dakota Senate from the 30th district
- In office January 11, 2011 – 2017
- Preceded by: Gordon Howie
- Succeeded by: Lance Russell

Personal details
- Born: July 21, 1942 (age 84) Iowa, United States
- Party: Republican
- Education: University of Montana
- Website: rampelbergforsenate.com

Bruce Emerson Rampelberg (born July 21, 1942) is an American politician. He served as a Republican member of the South Dakota Senate, representing District 30, from January 11, 2011, to 2017.

Rampelberg was defeated by Lance Russell in the 2016 Republican primary.

== Education ==
Rampelberg earned his BS in business education from the University of Montana.

== Elections ==
- 2012 Rampelberg's 2010 opponent challenged him again in the June 5, 2012 Republican Primary, setting up a rematch; Rampelberg won with 1,830 votes (57.78%) Rampelberg was unopposed for the November 6, 2012 General election, winning with 8,686 votes.
- 2010 When Senate District 30 incumbent Republican Senator Gordon Howie ran for Governor of South Dakota, Rampelberg ran in the June 8, 2010 Republican Primary and won with 2,011 votes (50.2%) including an election recount which did not change the result; he was unopposed for the November 2, 2010 General election, winning with 7,925 votes. His campaign site says to elect Rampelberg, "...to uphold conservative Republican values...."
