= Tim Goodwin =

Tim Goodwin may refer to:

- Tim Goodwin (South Dakota politician), member of the South Dakota House of Representatives
- Tim Goodwin (Iowa politician), member of the Iowa Senate

== See also ==
- Timothy Goodwin, archbishop of Cashel
