= Senator Kraus =

Senator Kraus may refer to:

- Dick Kraus (1937–2019), Massachusetts State Senate
- Elizabeth Kraus (born 1943), South Dakota State Senate
- Will Kraus (born 1973), Missouri State Senate
