= Senator McCracken =

Senator McCracken may refer to:

- Royal McCracken (1941–2025), South Dakota State Senate
- Thomas McCracken Jr. (born 1952), Illinois State Senate
