= Trish Ladner =

Women state legislators in South Dakota

Member of the South Dakota House of Representatives from the 30th district
- Incumbent
- Assumed office January 12, 2021 Serving with Tim Goodwin
- Preceded by: Julie Frye-Mueller

Personal details
- Born: September 5, 1953 (age 72)
- Party: Republican

Trish Ladner (born September 5, 1953) is an American politician serving as a member of the South Dakota House of Representatives from the 30th district. Elected in November 2020, she assumed office on January 12, 2021.

== Career ==
Ladner was elected to House with 8,668 votes along with Tim Goodwin, who received 8,435 votes.

Ladner is also a member of the South Dakota Executive Board. In June 2021, Ladner authored an op-ed in the Rapid City Journal in which she criticized critical race theory and pledged to support legislation to ban it from being taught in South Dakota.

== Election history ==
2020 South Dakota House of Representatives District 30 General election
| Party | Candidate | Votes | % |
|---|---|---|---|
| Republican | Trish Ladner | 8,668 | 50.68% |
| Republican | Tim Goodwin (incumbent) | 8,435 | 49.32% |
| Total votes | | 17,103 | 100.0% |
| Republican hold | | | |
| Republican hold | | | |
