= Craig Tieszen =

American politician

Member of the South Dakota House of Representatives from the 34th district
- In office January 10 – November 23, 2017
- Preceded by: David Lust
- Succeeded by: Michael Diedrich

Member of the South Dakota Senate from the 34th district
- In office January 2009 – January 10, 2017
- Preceded by: Royal McCracken
- Succeeded by: Jeffrey Partridge

Personal details
- Born: October 24, 1949
- Died: November 23, 2017 (aged 68) Rarotonga, Cook Islands
- Party: Republican
- Profession: Chief of police

Craig Tieszen (October 24, 1949 − November 23, 2017) was an American politician who was a Republican member of the South Dakota Senate, representing District 34 from January 2009 to January 2017, and represented District 34 in the South Dakota House of Representatives from January 2017 to his death 10 months later. Tieszen was a volunteer for the Peace Corps and served as the chief of police for the Rapid City Police Department.

== Elections ==
- 2012 Tieszen was challenged in the June 5, 2012 Republican Primary but won with 2,115 votes (79.33%) and was unopposed for the November 6, 2012 General election, winning with 8,283 votes.
- 2008 When District 34 incumbent Republican Senator Royal McCracken was term limited and left the seat open, Tieszen won the June 3, 2008 Republican Primary with 1,640 votes (60.67%) and won the November 4, 2008 General election with 7,914 votes (70.29%) against Democratic nominee Gary Hargens.
- 2010 Tieszen was unopposed for both the June 8, 2010 Republican Primary and the November 2, 2010 General election, winning with 7,136 votes.

== Death ==
On November 22, 2017, Tieszen and his brother-in-law, Brent Moline, were found dead in open water in the Cook Islands. It was concluded that Tieszen drowned while attempting to save his brother-in-law from drowning while kayaking.
