= Jim Shaw (South Dakota politician) =

American journalist and politician (1946–2024)

Mayor of Rapid City, South Dakota
- In office 1997–2001
- Preceded by: Edward Ralph McLaughlin
- Succeeded by: Jerry Munson
- In office 2003–2007
- Preceded by: Jerry Munson
- Succeeded by: Alan Hanks

Personal details
- Born: James E. Shaw; October 30, 1946 Elmira, New York, U.S.
- Died: July 5, 2024 (aged 77)

James E. Shaw (October 30, 1946 – July 5, 2024) was an American politician. He served four terms as mayor of Rapid City, South Dakota, from 1997 to 1999, from 1999 to 2001 and again from 2003 to 2005 and from 2005 to 2007. Economic development of Rapid City was a main focus of his administration.

== Biography ==
Shaw was born October 30, 1946, in Elmira, New York. He grew up in Dundee, New York, and attended the State University of New York at Fredonia and the South Dakota School of Mines and Technology.

Prior to being elected mayor, Shaw was a radio personality and television news anchor on KOTA-TV in Rapid City.

Shaw was part of a statewide, non-partisan effort to persuade the BRAC (Base Realignment Commission) to remove Ellsworth Air Force Base near Rapid City from the list of recommended closures in 2005, according to Pat McElgunn, Military Affairs Chairman of the RC Chamber of Commerce. Shaw, along with U.S. Senators Tim Johnson, John Thune, Representative Stephanie Herseth Sandlin and Governor Mike Rounds, testified before the BRAC committee public hearing in Rapid City in favor of keeping Ellsworth open. Later that summer, the BRAC voted to remove Ellsworth from the list of recommended closures, and Shaw called it "a grand and glorious day for our community."

Shaw was arrested on August 11, 2006, and charged with disorderly conduct and resisting arrest. He claimed that police officers overreacted, and was banned for life from the Iowa State Fair, where the incident occurred. He initially pleaded not guilty, but later pleaded guilty and was fined.

In 2009 Shaw was part of a group that purchased the Black Hills Speedway and planned to renovate it in order to attract more visitors. In early January 2010 the Rapid City Journal named him as one of the "Ten in 2010"—ten local residents to watch in the year to follow because they were expected to make news.

Shaw was arrested again in 2012, this time in Rapid City, for speeding. He was also charged with obstruction and failure to yield. Then in 2014, Shaw was fined for disturbing an election. Shaw stated later that year that he was struggling to manage diabetes, on which he blamed his legal troubles.

Shaw died on July 5, 2024, at the age of 77.
