= Scott Heidepriem =

American politician

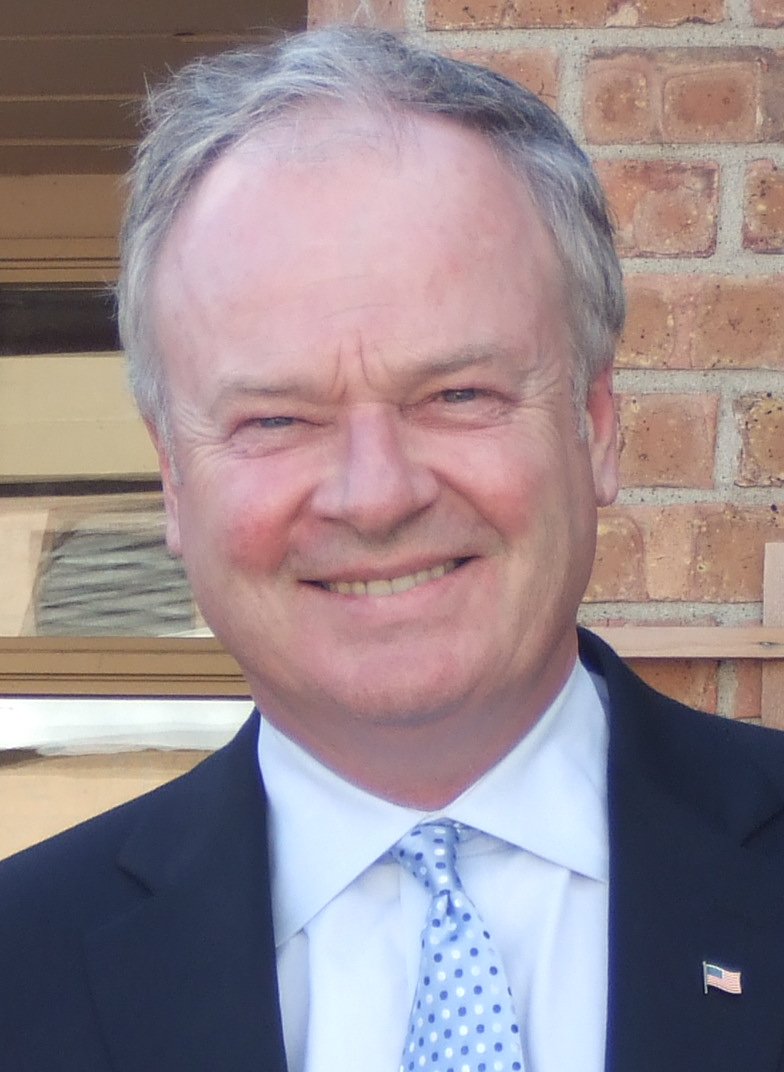

Member of the South Dakota Senate from the 13th district
- In office January 2007 – January 2011
- Preceded by: Mary McClure
- Succeeded by: Phyllis Heineman

Personal details
- Born: June 25, 1956 (age 70) Miller, South Dakota, U.S.
- Party: Republican (before 2000); Democratic (2000–present)
- Spouse: Susan
- Children: 2
- Education: University of South Dakota (BA, MA, PhD); Harvard University (MPA)

Scott N. Heidepriem (born June 25, 1956) is an American attorney and former South Dakota state legislator.

== Early life, education, and career ==
Heidepriem graduated with his bachelors, masters, and juris doctor from the University of South Dakota. He later graduated from John F. Kennedy School of Government with a masters in public administration.

Heidepriem is a past president of the South Dakota Trial Lawyers.

== Political career ==
In 1986, Heidepriem ran for the Republican nomination for the United States House of Representatives from South Dakota's At-large congressional district, but he lost to Dale Bell.

In 2000, Heidepriem switched from the Republican party to the Democratic Party.

In 2006, Heidepriem successfully ran as a Democrat for the South Dakota State Senate and was re-elected in 2008 against State Representative Phyllis Heineman. While in state legislature, he was the Speaker of the House, Pro Tempore, chairman of the Senate Judiciary Committee, and Senate Minority Leader for four years.

in 2010, Heidepriem was the Democratic nominee for Governor of South Dakota and attempted to run on an bi-partisan ticket. However, Secretary of State Chris Nelson would not certify the nomination, due to a state law requiring all candidates of a particular political party to belong to that party. Polls indicated that Heidepriem would have a difficult time winning in such a conservative state; this was validated when he lost the election with only 38.49% of the vote.

== Selected works ==
=== Books ===
- Bring on the Pioneers!, The State Publishing Co. (1978), a history of Hand County
- A Fair Chance for a Free People, Leader Printing Company (1988), a biography of Karl E. Mundt.

=== Publications ===
"Tort Reform in South Dakota - The Plaintiff's Perspective," co-authored with Nancy Turbak Berry, Vol. 42, Issue 2, 1999

Party political offices
Preceded by Jack Billion	Democratic nominee for Governor of South Dakota; 2010	Succeeded by Susan Wismer
