= Jessie Sanders =

American politician (1893–1985)

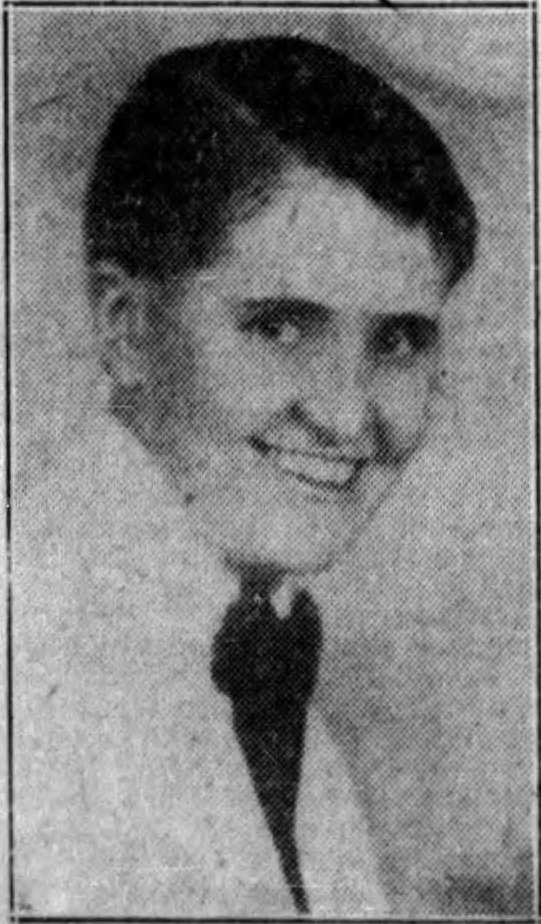
- Sanders, circa 1932

Member of the South Dakota House of Representatives from Pennington County
- In office 1932–1936

Member of the South Dakota Senate from the 40th district
- In office 1936–1938
- Preceded by: John Boland
- Succeeded by: Constituency abolished (Note: In 1938, Sanders ran for reelection in the redrawn 28th district, but lost to Charles S. Reed.)

Personal details
- Born: March 24, 1893 Rapid City, South Dakota
- Died: January 15, 1985 (aged 91) Hisega, South Dakota
- Party: Democratic
- Children: 1 (Charles)
- Education: University of Arizona (Note: The Biographical Directory of the South Dakota Legislature, published by the South Dakota Legislative Research Council, incorrectly lists her as attending Arizona State University. However, sources from during her lifetime state she attended the University of Arizona.)

Jessie E. Sanders (March 24, 1893 – January 15, 1985) was an American politician. A Democrat, she served two terms in the South Dakota House of Representatives and one term in the South Dakota Senate. She was the first woman to be elected to the state Senate.

== Early life and education ==
Sanders was born on March 24, 1893 in Rapid City, South Dakota, alongside her twin sister Bessie Little. Sanders' mother died when she was an infant, and her and her sister were adopted into different families. Following her adoption, she grew up on a ranch in nearby Hisega, graduating from Lead High School in 1911. She attended the University of Arizona, where she first met her twin sister at the age of 18.

Sanders married her husband, Carl, on May 19, 1915.

== Political career ==
Prior to entering politics, Sanders worked as a teacher in Pennington County, and had been teaching since 1912. In 1932, Sanders was asked to run by the local Democratic Party as school superintendent for the county. She turned down the nomination, but agreed to run for the South Dakota House of Representatives. She was elected that year alongside fellow Democrat C. J. Horgan.

As a member of the House, Sanders served as chairman of the House Education Committee, as well as a member of the Taxation and Assessment Committee and the Roads and Highways Committee. In 1933, while Sanders was chairman, the state of South Dakota granted $1 million ($24.9 million in 2025) in funding to local schools, the first time the state had given such a grant. She was reelected to the House in 1934.

In 1936, Sanders won election to the South Dakota Senate as a Senator from the 40th district, becoming the first woman elected to the Senate. She was offered the position of chairman of the Senate Education Committee, but turned it down. Following redistricting, the 40th district was abolished, and Sanders became a resident of the 28th district. She ran for reelection there in 1938, but lost to Republican challenger Charles S. Reed.

Sanders was nominated as the Democratic candidate for South Dakota's 2nd congressional district in the 1948 United States House of Representatives elections. She received 34.1% of the vote, losing to incumbent Francis Case. She ran for a seat in the South Dakota House of Representatives in 1958, but ultimately lost the election.

== Personal life ==
Sanders and her husband Carl operated the Triangle I Lodge, a dude ranch in Hisega which offered summer vacation packages to visitors. The two took over the lodge from its previous owners in 1929, and operated the lodge until 1969, when it was sold to Hoadley Dean.

Sanders also worked as a dining room manager at the Hotel Alex Johnson, and as a disbursement officer at the Works Progress Administration in 1937.

== Death ==
Sanders died at her home in Hisega on January 15, 1985. She was 91.
