= Tom Hennies =

American politician

Member of the South Dakota House of Representatives from the 32nd district
- In office 1999–2006 Serving with Mike Wilson (1999–2001); Stan Adelstein (2001–2005); Alan Hanks (2005–2006)

Personal details
- Born: August 11, 1939 Wagner, South Dakota, U.S.
- Died: August 11, 2009 (aged 70) Rochester, Minnesota, U.S.
- Resting place: Black Hills National Cemetery
- Party: Republican
- Education: Black Hills Teachers College; University of South Dakota

Thomas L. Hennies (August 11, 1939 – August 11, 2009) was an American police officer and politician.

Tom Hennies was the third son born to Lewis and Mariellen Hennies in Wagner, South Dakota on August 11, 1939. The family moved to Chamberlain, then Rapid City, where Hennies was raised alongside older brothers Ron and Don Hennies. Tom Hennies graduated from Rapid City High School in 1957 and became a firefighter for the Chicago Northwestern Railroad. Later that year, he enlisted in the United States Army. He was assigned to the United States Army Security Agency and sent to Japan. After a year in Japan, Hennies was reassigned to South Korea, where he remained until discharge from active service.

Hennies attended the Black Hills Teachers College and University of South Dakota. He married Ann Luedemann in 1963 and joined the Rapid City Police Department two years later. He was on duty during the 1972 Black Hills flood, and eventually found himself floating in his patrol car. Shortly after radioing for help, he was rescued by the Rapid City Fire Department. In 1984, Hennies was named police chief of Rapid City, and established a partnership with the Pennington County Sheriff's Office. Hennies stepped down as police chief in 2000 to focus on his duties as a member of the South Dakota House of Representatives, to which he had first been elected in 1998. When Hennies won reelection in 2000, his brother Don began his first term in same legislative body. In his final reelection campaign in 2004, Hennies finished first in District 32, ahead of fellow Republican Alan Hanks, Democrats Mike Wilson and Anita Paige. Near the end of his fourth and final term as a state representative, Hennies was diagnosed with Legionnaires' disease. He was seeking treatment for the disease at Mayo Clinic when he died on his birthday at the age of 70, on August 11, 2009. His funeral was held on August 18, 2009, with the entire Rapid City Police Department in attendance. Hennies was interred at the Black Hills National Cemetery.
