= Don Hennies =

American politician

Member of the South Dakota House of Representatives from the 13th district
- In office January 2, 2001 – January 2003 Serving with Phyllis Heineman
- Preceded by: Mary Patterson
- Succeeded by: Bill Thompson

Personal details
- Born: 1937 (age 88–89)
- Party: Republican
- Website: www.hennieshomeinspection.com

Donald D. Hennies (born c. 1937) is an American politician from South Dakota who represented the 13th district in the South Dakota House of Representatives from 2001 to 2003, alongside Phyllis Heineman.

== Political career ==
Don Hennies won election to the South Dakota House of Representatives in November 2000, and was sworn in on January 2, 2001. He was appointed to the taxation and transportation committees shortly before taking office. In February 2001, Hennies spoke out against increased taxation on tobacco products.

== Personal ==
Outside of politics, Heenies worked as an engineer and construction manager. His older brother Ron was an Episcopalian priest. A younger brother, Tom, was a member of the South Dakota House of Representatives from 1999 to 2006.
