= John Boland (South Dakota politician) =

American politician (1884–1958)

Mayor of Rapid City, South Dakota
- In office 1924–1925
- Preceded by: Harry Wentzy
- Succeeded by: Charles Tittle

Member of the South Dakota Senate from the 40th district
- In office 1929–1936
- Preceded by: Joseph L. Robbins
- Succeeded by: Jessie E. Sanders

Personal details
- Born: May 2, 1884 Rapid City, South Dakota
- Died: October 9, 1958 (aged 74) Rapid City, South Dakota
- Resting place: Mountain View Cemetery, Rapid City, South Dakota
- Party: Republican
- Spouse: Nona Etthel Winne (m. 1915)
- Children: 2
- Education: South Dakota School of Mines; Lincoln Business College

John Abram Boland Sr. (May 2, 1884 – October 9, 1958) was an American politician and businessman from South Dakota. He was an early supporter of Mount Rushmore and served as treasurer for its construction costs between 1929 and 1938. He served as mayor of Rapid City, South Dakota, between 1924 and 1925, and as a member of the South Dakota Senate between 1929 and 1936. Boland also owned a number of stores and businesses in the area and helped oversee South Dakota's financial support for World War I. He was inducted into the South Dakota Hall of Fame in 1978.

== Early life ==
John Boland was born on May 2, 1884, in Rapid City, South Dakota. (Note: Some sources state his place of birth as Keystone, South Dakota.) His family was of Scotch-Irish descent. His father, Abram Boland, had travelled to the Black Hills during the gold rush and established a feed store in Rapid City. He had an elder brother, William. John Boland attended the South Dakota School of Mines and Technology between 1899 and 1901. His first business venture was a flour and feed store, which he purchased from his father in 1903 only for it to go bankrupt a few months later. He worked as a miner and logger in the Keystone area to pay off his debts before attending Lincoln Business College in Lincoln, Nebraska, in 1904. The following year, Boland graduated and returned to South Dakota and worked various jobs. He was elected president of the Keystone school board in 1908, which he held until 1917. He later purchased a second store, which was destroyed in a fire in 1917. His next store, the Rapid City Implement Company, was more successful. Boland sold farm equipment and vehicles to local residents and lent money to local farmers impacted by the Dust Bowl and Great Depression.

Boland ran a number of other stores and business ventures, including the Spearfish, Newell, and Belle Fourche Implement Companies; the Black Hills-Albright Grocery; and served as director of the First National Bank of the Black Hills. He was also head of the Alex Johnson Hotel Company and president of the Black Hills and Western Railroad.

== Political career ==
In 1921, Boland became a Rapid City Commissioner and remained in that role until 1923. He then served two years as Mayor of Rapid City between 1923 and 1925. He was elected to the South Dakota Senate in 1929 and served until 1936. While senator, Boland was chairman of the state parks committee. During this time, he helped secure funding for the establishment of Badlands National Monument. Boland served as a delegate to the 1944 Republican National Convention.

Besides his political offices, Boland held a number of other community and civic posts. He served as secretary of the Liberty Loan Committee for Pennington County during World War I, president of the Rapid City Chamber of Commerce in 1927, and a member of the Public Works Advisory Committee of South Dakota between 1933 and 1934. During World War II, Boland worked in a variety of roles to help finance the war, including coordinator of the Tenth District of the War Bond Campaign, a chairman of the Victory Fund Committee, and director and coordinator of the South Dakota War Finance Commission.

== Mount Rushmore ==
Mount Rushmore

In 1925, while Boland was mayor, Gutzon Borglum arrived in Rapid City with a proposal to build Mount Rushmore. As well as personally contributing, Boland led the local fundraising drive for the project. After the passage of the Norbeck-Williamson Act of 1929, Boland was appointed president of the executive committee for the Mount Rushmore National Memorial Commission, making him the project manager and treasurer. Boland became responsible for handling creditors and loans, imposing budget constraints, managing debt, and ensuring all federal funding was spent as required.

This often resulted in clashes between Boland and Borglum, who was unhappy with having to clear plans with Boland first. However, Boland personally contributed financially not just to Mount Rushmore but also to Borglum himself; when Borglum's house was threatened with repossession, Boland ensured loans were available, once providing Borglum with a personal loan.

In 1938, Borglum sought to pass an appropriation bill for additional federal funding on the project. Borglum's ability to continue the project and Boland's effectiveness as a manager were called into question. Boland stated, "Mr. Borglum is an artist and I am a businessman. Therefore it is only natural that we should at times disagree regarding the business functions of the Commission. Such differences, however, have never been serious and an amicable understanding has always been reached." Boland refused to testify against Borglum's character, and due to mounting pressure, Boland opted to resign from the committee in order for the bill to pass. However, after budget adjustments in the wake of the outbreak of World War II in 1939, Boland was again installed as supervisor to the project. He and Borglum subsequently reconciled, and Boland became president of the Mount Rushmore National Memorial Society of the Black Hills in 1941.

== Personal life ==
Boland married Nona Etthel Winne on October 2, 1915, in Buffalo Gap, South Dakota. The couple had two children together: their daughter, Ethel, died in infancy; their son, John A. Boland Jr., succeeded his father as president of the Rapid City Implement Company.

== Death ==
Boland died in Rapid City on October 9, 1958, (Note: The South Dakota Hall of Fame erroneously lists his date of death as October 7.) of a heart attack. He was buried in Rapid City's Mountain View Cemetery.

== Legacy ==
In 1954, the National Park Service (NPS) named Boland Ridge inside Wind Cave National Park after Boland and his family, who had a long history of supporting the NPS. Three of Boland's relatives had served as superintendents to the park.

Boland was inducted into the South Dakota Hall of Fame in 1978.
