= Tom Katus =

American politician

Member of the South Dakota Senate from the 32nd district
- In office 2006–2008
- Preceded by: Stan Adelstein
- Succeeded by: Stan Adelstein

Personal details
- Born: February 13, 1940 (age 86)
- Party: Democratic
- Occupation: Business Development Executive

Thomas M. Katus (born February 13, 1940) is a former Democratic member of the South Dakota Senate, representing the 32nd district during the 2006 and 2007 legislative sessions.

Katus was defeated for re-election in 2008. He was nominated unopposed to run for state treasurer as the June 2010 Democratic convention, but lost to Rich Sattgast.

Party political offices
Vacant Title last held by Scott McGregor	Democratic nominee for South Dakota State Treasurer; 2010	Succeeded by Denny Pierson
