= Hisega, South Dakota =

Unincorporated community in South Dakota, U.S.

Coordinates: 44°03′12″N 103°24′07″W

Hisega is an unincorporated community in Pennington County, in the U.S. state of South Dakota.

== History ==
A post office called Hisega was established in 1913, and remained in operation until 1945. The post office may have operated during the summer season only. Hisega is an acronym formed from the names of these local women: Helen, Ida, Sadie, Ethel, Grace, and Ada.

== Notable person ==
- Jessie Sanders, state legislator and ranch operator
