= 2022 United States House of Representatives election in South Dakota =

2022 United States House of Representatives election in South Dakota's at-large district
- November 8, 2022
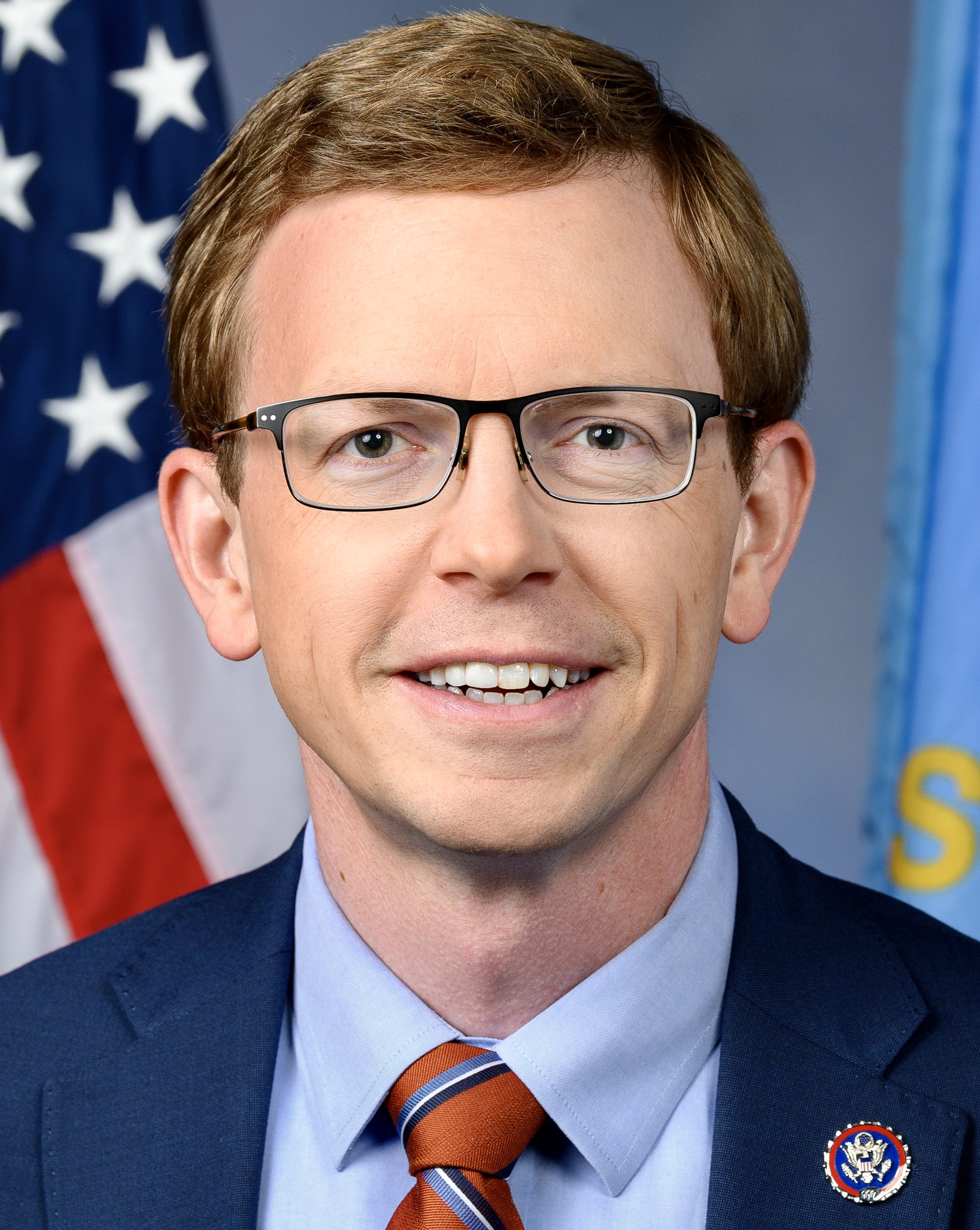

Nominee	Dusty Johnson	Collin Duprel
Party	Republican	Libertarian
Popular vote	253,821	74,020
Percentage	77.42%	22.58%
- County results Johnson: 60–70% 70–80% 80–90% >90% Duprel: 50–60% 60–70%
U.S. Representative before election
Dusty Johnson
Republican
Elected U.S. Representative
Dusty Johnson
Republican

The 2022 United States House of Representatives election in South Dakota was held on November 8, 2022, to elect the U.S. representative from South Dakota's at-large congressional district. The election coincided with other elections to the House of Representatives, elections to the United States Senate and various state and local elections.

Incumbent Republican Dusty Johnson was re-elected with 81.0% of the vote in 2020. Johnson defeated state representative Taffy Howard in the Republican primary. No Democratic candidate appeared on the ballot, Johnson's only general election opponent was Libertarian Collin Duprel.

Though Johnson won comfortably in a 55-point win, mainly due to competing against a candidate of a minor party, Duprel made a bit of a stronger performance than some had expected, with over 22% of the vote. Johnson himself received over 77% of the vote.

== Republican primary ==
=== Candidates ===
==== Nominee ====
- Dusty Johnson, incumbent U.S. Representative

==== Eliminated in primary ====
- Taffy Howard, state representative from the 33rd district

=== Polling ===
Poll source	Date(s) administered	Sample size (Note: Key: A – all adults RV – registered voters LV – likely voters V – unclear)	Margin of error	Dusty Johnson	Taffy Howard	Undecided
South Dakota State University	May 2–15, 2022	– (LV)	± 3.0%	53%	17%	30%

=== Primary results ===
Results by county: Johnson: 50–60%; 60–70%; 70–80%; Howard: 50–60%; 60–70%

Republican primary results
Party	Candidate	Votes	%
Republican	Dusty Johnson (incumbent)	70,728	59.25%
Republican	Taffy Howard	48,645	40.75%
Total votes		119,373	100.0%

== Libertarian convention ==
=== Candidates ===
==== Nominee ====
- Collin Duprel, cattle rancher

== Democratic primary ==
Ryan Ryder dropped out of the race after past tweets of his were exposed, with subject matter including Ryder fantasizing about killing Johnson's family, and that he had masturbated to a photo of Governor Kristi Noem.

=== Candidates ===
==== Withdrew ====
- Ryan Ryder, lawyer

==== Declined ====
- Troy Heinert, Minority Leader of the South Dakota Senate

== General election ==
=== Predictions ===
Source	Ranking	As of
The Cook Political Report	Solid R	October 5, 2021
Inside Elections	Solid R	October 11, 2021
Sabato's Crystal Ball	Safe R	October 5, 2021
Politico	Solid R	April 5, 2022
RCP	Safe R	June 9, 2022
Fox News	Solid R	July 11, 2022
DDHQ	Solid R	July 20, 2022
538	Solid R	June 30, 2022

=== Polling ===
Poll source	Date(s) administered	Sample size	Margin of error	Dusty Johnson (R)	Collin Duprel (L)	Undecided
Emerson College	October 19–21, 2022	1,500 (LV)	± 2.4%	59%	16%	25%

=== Results ===
2022 South Dakota's at-large congressional district election
Party	Candidate	Votes	%	±%
Republican	Dusty Johnson (incumbent)	253,821	77.42%	−3.54%
Libertarian	Collin Duprel	74,020	22.58%	+3.54%
Total votes		327,841	100.00%	N/A
Republican hold				

==== By county ====
County	Dusty Johnson Republican		Collin Duprel Libertarian		Margin		Total
County	#	%	#	%	#	%	Total
Aurora	989	84.67%	179	15.33%	810	69.35%	1,168
Beadle	4,712	84.41%	870	15.59%	3,842	68.83%	5,582
Bennett	699	73.04%	258	26.96%	441	46.08%	957
Bon Homme	2,057	84.13%	388	15.87%	1,669	68.26%	2,445
Brookings	8,783	76.11%	2,757	23.89%	6,026	52.22%	11,540
Brown	10,425	79.53%	2,684	20.47%	7,741	59.05%	13,109
Brule	1,652	81.82%	367	18.18%	1,285	63.65%	2,019
Buffalo	211	60.29%	139	39.71%	72	20.57%	350
Butte	3,021	74.72%	1,022	25.28%	1,999	49.44%	4,043
Campbell	583	90.11%	64	9.89%	519	80.22%	647
Charles Mix	2,391	80.70%	572	19.30%	1,819	61.39%	2,963
Clark	1,320	86.11%	213	13.89%	1,107	72.21%	1,533
Clay	2,971	71.87%	1,163	28.13%	1,808	43.73%	4,134
Codington	8,729	82.98%	1,790	17.02%	6,939	65.97%	10,519
Corson	550	67.16%	269	32.84%	281	34.31%	819
Custer	3,753	78.58%	1,023	21.42%	2,730	57.16%	4,776
Davison	5,769	83.46%	1,143	16.54%	4,626	66.93%	6,912
Day	1,898	79.81%	480	20.19%	1,418	59.63%	2,378
Deuel	1,643	85.48%	279	14.52%	1,364	70.97%	1,922
Dewey	870	62.63%	519	37.37%	351	25.27%	1,389
Douglas	1,279	89.75%	146	10.25%	1,133	79.51%	1,425
Edmunds	1,440	87.80%	200	12.20%	1,240	75.61%	1,640
Fall River	2,700	78.06%	759	21.94%	1,941	56.11%	3,459
Faulk	779	84.77%	140	15.23%	639	69.53%	919
Grant	2,587	84.68%	468	15.32%	2,119	69.36%	3,055
Gregory	1,690	85.79%	280	14.21%	1,410	71.57%	1,970
Haakon	791	82.74%	165	17.26%	626	65.48%	956
Hamlin	2,255	86.04%	366	13.96%	1,889	72.07%	2,621
Hand	1,259	86.47%	197	13.53%	1,062	72.94%	1,456
Hanson	1,336	85.15%	233	14.85%	1,103	70.30%	1,569
Harding	518	78.37%	143	21.63%	375	56.73%	661
Hughes	5,706	80.19%	1,410	19.81%	4,296	60.37%	7,116
Hutchinson	2,690	88.25%	358	11.75%	2,332	76.51%	3,048
Hyde	479	85.54%	81	14.46%	398	71.07%	560
Jackson	598	70.77%	247	29.23%	351	41.54%	845
Jerauld	720	87.27%	105	12.73%	615	74.55%	825
Jones	391	84.45%	72	15.55%	319	68.90%	463
Kingsbury	2,055	84.05%	390	15.95%	1,665	68.10%	2,445
Lake	3,810	81.85%	845	18.15%	2,965	63.69%	4,655
Lawrence	8,479	73.87%	2,999	26.13%	5,480	47.74%	11,478
Lincoln	21,002	79.67%	5,360	20.33%	15,642	59.34%	26,362
Lyman	982	78.62%	267	21.38%	715	57.25%	1,249
Marshall	1,378	77.90%	391	22.10%	987	55.79%	1,769
McCook	2,054	84.08%	389	15.92%	1,665	68.15%	2,443
McPherson	953	88.57%	123	11.43%	830	77.14%	1,076
Meade	8,152	71.22%	3,294	28.78%	4,858	42.44%	11,446
Mellette	429	72.96%	159	27.04%	270	45.92%	588
Miner	828	86.16%	133	13.84%	695	72.32%	961
Minnehaha	50,693	74.05%	17,765	25.95%	32,928	48.10%	68,458
Moody	1,976	77.49%	574	22.51%	1,402	54.98%	2,550
Oglala Lakota	647	32.63%	1,336	67.37%	-689	-34.75%	1,983
Pennington	31,305	73.86%	11,080	26.14%	20,225	47.72%	42,385
Perkins	1,060	78.99%	282	21.01%	778	57.97%	1,342
Potter	944	87.41%	136	12.59%	808	74.81%	1,080
Roberts	2,590	77.82%	738	22.18%	1,852	55.65%	3,328
Sanborn	845	87.20%	124	12.80%	721	74.41%	969
Spink	2,166	84.08%	410	15.92%	1,756	68.17%	2,576
Stanley	1,129	80.59%	272	19.41%	857	61.17%	1,401
Sully	625	82.89%	129	17.11%	496	65.78%	754
Todd	677	41.69%	947	58.31%	-270	-16.63%	1,624
Tripp	1,865	85.16%	325	14.84%	1,540	70.32%	2,190
Turner	3,174	84.98%	561	15.02%	2,613	69.96%	3,735
Union	5,180	81.97%	1,139	18.03%	4,041	63.95%	6,319
Walworth	1,691	86.19%	271	13.81%	1,420	72.38%	1,962
Yankton	6,499	78.27%	1,804	21.73%	4,695	56.55%	8,303
Ziebach	389	63.05%	228	36.95%	161	26.09%	617
Totals	253,821	77.42%	74,020	22.58%	179,801	54.84%	327,841
