= Edward R. McLaughlin =

American politician (born 1928)

Mayor of Rapid City
- In office 1991–1997
- Preceded by: Keith Carlyle
- Succeeded by: Jim Shaw

Member of the South Dakota House of Representatives
- In office 2000–2010
- Succeeded by: Dan Dryden

Personal details
- Born: April 13, 1928 (age 98) Spearfish, South Dakota, U.S.
- Party: Republican
- Spouse(s): Gail Heinbaugh; Doris Marie Strom
- Children: five
- Profession: insurance agent, educator

Edward Ralph McLaughlin (born June 16, 1928) is an American retired politician in the state of South Dakota. He was a member of the South Dakota House of Representatives from 2000 to 2010. He worked as an insurance agent, academic administrator, and educator. He was also a member of the Rapid City Common Council and, between 1991 and 1997, mayor of Rapid City. In 2013, he was appointed to the Rapid City school board.
