= Alan Hanks =

American politician

Mayor of Rapid City, South Dakota
- In office July 2, 2007 – July 5, 2011
- Preceded by: Jim Shaw
- Succeeded by: Sam Kooiker

Member of the South Dakota House of Representatives from the 32nd district
- In office 2004 – July 2, 2007 Serving with Tom Hennies
- Succeeded by: Brian Gosch

Personal details
- Born: April 4, 1960 (age 66)

Alan Hanks (born April 4, 1960) is an American politician. He served on the Rapid City Council from 1996 to 2004, in the South Dakota House of Representatives from 2004 to 2007, and as mayor of Rapid City from 2007 to 2011.

== Background ==
Hanks was born in 1960 to parents Ethan and Fae Hanks. The three, along with Hanks' two siblings, moved to Rapid City, South Dakota when Hanks was 9 years old. There, Hanks' parents taught in the city school system. Hanks attended Stevens High School, where he was involved in football, basketball, and track. He graduated in 1979. In 1983, he received a degree in business administration from the University of South Dakota.

Following college, Hanks returned to Rapid City to manage a large furniture store, and in 1987, he opened four of his own stores in both Rapid City and Sioux Falls. In 2001, after owning his stores for almost 20 years, Hanks built the Heartland RV Park and Cabins on Highway 79 (which he continues to operate). In 2005, Hanks began work as a licensed real estate appraiser and owns and manages Hanks Appraisal Services.

It was not until 1996 that Hanks ventured into politics. He began as an appointed member of the Rapid City planning commission, and in 1998 was elected to the City Council as Ward 1 Alderman. He served on several subcommittees and was elected as President of the City Council. In 2004, Hanks was elected to the South Dakota State Legislature as a state representative from District 32. After three years in this position, Hanks defeated Jim Shaw for the office of Mayor of Rapid City, SD serving two terms. In 2008, he received the Rapid City Elks Club's Distinguished Citizenship Award.

== Personal ==
Hanks has one daughter, Breanna.
