= Mary Patterson (politician) =

American singer and politician

Member of the South Dakota House of Representatives from the 13th district
- In office January 1999 – January 2001 Serving with Phyllis Heineman
- Succeeded by: Don Hennies

Personal details
- Born: February 8, 1927 Council Bluffs, Iowa, U.S.
- Died: November 11, 2016 (aged 89)
- Party: Democratic
- Education: University of Sioux Falls; University of Nebraska; University of Colorado Boulder

Mary Alice Crabill Patterson (February 8, 1927 – November 11, 2016) was an American singer and politician.

== Biography ==
Born in Council Bluffs, Iowa on February 8, 1927, to Jacob and Mary Emmaline Crabill, Mary Alice Crabill earned her bachelor's degree from the University of Sioux Falls. She obtained a Master of Arts degree from University of Nebraska and received a doctorate from the University of Colorado Boulder. Crabill met Perry Patterson in 1949, and married him in 1954. The couple returned to South Dakota, and both taught at the University of Sioux Falls. Mary Patterson later joined the faculty of the University of South Dakota, and Augustana University. She served on the South Dakota House of Representatives from 1999 to 2000. Patterson contested the 2000 and 2004 state house elections, losing both times.
