= Jacqueline Sly =

American politician (born 1948)

Member of the South Dakota House of Representatives from the 33rd district
- Incumbent
- Assumed office January 2009 Serving with Phil Jensen (2009–2013); Scott Craig (2013–present)

Personal details
- Born: May 17, 1948 (age 78)
- Party: Republican
- Education: Northern State University; Black Hills State University
- Profession: Teacher

Jacqueline Sly (born May 17, 1948) is an American politician and a Republican member of the South Dakota House of Representatives representing District 33 since January 2009.

== Education ==
Sly earned her Bachelor of Arts degrees in elementary and special education from Northern State University and her Master of Arts degrees in curriculum and instruction from Black Hills State University.

== Elections ==
- 2012 When incumbent Republican Representative Phil Jensen ran for South Dakota Senate and left a District 33 seat open, Sly and Scott Craig were unopposed for the June 5, 2012 Republican Primary; in the three-way November 6, 2012 General election, Sly took the first seat with 6,308 votes (43.2%) and Craig took the second seat ahead of Democratic nominee Robin Page.
- 2008 When District 33 incumbent Republican Representatives Michael Buckingham ran for South Dakota Senate and Don Van Etten was term limited and left the Legislature leaving both District 33 seats open, Sly ran in the four-way June 3, 2008 Republican Primary and placed first with 850 votes (28.8%); in the four-way November 4, 2008 General election Sly took the first seat with 5,043 votes (32.1%) and fellow Republican nominee Phil Jensen took the second seat ahead of Democratic nominees Jeff Nelson and Kimberly Henderson.
- 2010 Sly and incumbent Representative Jensen were unopposed for both the June 8, 2010 Republican Primary and the November 2, 2010 General election, where Representative Jensen took the first seat and Sly took the second seat with 3,769 votes (43.38%).
