= List of mayors of Rapid City, South Dakota =

Rapid City, South Dakota was founded in 1876 and was run by a village board of trustees until 1882, when John Richard Brennan, a member of the board and cofounder of the city, was chosen as mayor. Two months after the city was incorporated, Fred E. Stearns was elected mayor. The first form of elected government was mayor–council with an elected strong mayor. From 1910 to 1922, a city commission government was used. Later that year, the system of government was changed to council–manager. Rapid City returned to a mayor–council government in 1957. The Rapid City Council chose to extend the mayoral term to four years in 2015, and the change took effect in 2019. Former mayors Edward R. McLaughlin and Jim Shaw agreed with the change. There is no term limit.

== List ==
Name (term)	Term Began	Term End	Notes
John Richard Brennan	1882	1883	(1848–1919) One of four founders of the city in 1876
Fred E. Stearns	1883	1884	Known as the "cattle king of the foothills"
James Halley II	1884	1886	(1854–1920)
Andrew Jackson Simmons	1886	1887	(1834–1920) Born in New York, Simmons joined the California gold fields in 1853. He was speaker of territorial legislature of Nevada and mined at Alder Gulch in Montana in 1860's. He was colleague of Mark Twain. He was appointed Special Agent and titled Major by President Grant to obtain a right of way for railroad on a reservation, negotiating with Sitting Bull and other chiefs. In 1872, he took a part of the tribe members to Washington; Grant gave each an 1871 peace medal. Major Simmons was appointed Indian Agent at Milk River Agency Montana Territory. He arrived in Deadwood in 1878 engaging in mining activities including the Echo near Maitland. In 1882 he purchased 160 acres near the town site of Rapid City and built the Park Hotel. He donated land for the Missouri Valley Railroad.
John F. Schrader	1887	1888	(1855–1934)
David H. Clark	1888	1890	(1855–1891)
James Moses Woods	1890	1894	
Chauncey Lynch Wood (1)	1894	1896	First mayor to serve separate terms (1851–1911) Born in Jones County, Iowa; graduated from law school in 1875 and moved to Rapid City in 1878. Later moved to Seattle, where he died. Admitted to practice law before the United States Department of the Interior in 1901, also served as state's attorney in Pennington County. Was affiliated with the Socialist Party of America during the 1902 United States elections, represented the Democratic Party in the 1910 South Dakota gubernatorial election.
Valentine McGillycuddy	1896	1898	(1849–1939)
George B. Mansfield	1898	1899	
Chauncey Lynch Wood (2)	1899	1900	
Charles Wellington Brown	1900	1902	(1859–1912)
Ferdinand N. Emrick	1902	1908	Dentist (d. 1930)
Chauncey Lynch Wood (3)	1908	1910	
Robert J. Jackson	1910	1912	
Fred H. Rugg	1912	1914	Progressive Party presidential elector in 1912
William E. Robinson	1914	1918	
John L. Burke	1919	1920	
Claude E. Gray	1920	1922	
Harry Wentzy	1922	1924	Died in office
John Abram Boland	1924	1925	(1884–1958)
Charles Tittle	1925	1926	
Arthur Lampert	1926	1927	
Victor Jepson	1927	1928	
Eugene Bangs	1928	1929	
Theodore B. Werner	1929	1930	(1892–1989)
Winfield Morrill	1930	1931	
Melville Babington	1931	1932	
Fred Merritt	1933	1934	
Charles Leroy Doherty	1934	1936	(1889–1979)
Norbert De Kerchove	1937	1938	
Robert S. Hill	1938	1943	(1883–1970)
Therlo Burrington	1943	1944	
Stanton Neil	1944	1946	
Fred Dusek (1)	1946	1948	(1900–1984) Member of the Rapid City Common Council (1936–1947)
Earl Brockelsby	1948	1949	Founded the Black Hills Reptile Gardens
Isaac Chase	1949	1951	
Augustus Haines	1951	1953	(1900–1991)
Montford Wasser	1953	1954	
Harry R. Johnson	1954	1955	
Don L'Esperance	1955	1956	(1919–2008)
Henry Jay Baker (1)	1956	1957	
Fred Dusek (2)	1957	1961	Second and third terms. After serving his third term, also ran for the office in 1965 and 1975.
Willis Raff	1961	1963	
Phil Schroeder	1963	1965	introduced poverty reduction initiatives
Henry Jay Baker (2)	1965	1969	
Jack Allmon	1969	1970	
John Barnes	1970	1971	
Donald V. Barnett	1971	1975	Mayor at time of the Black Hills Flood of 1972, also known as the Rapid City Flood, with a death toll of more than 200
Arthur Lacroix	1975	1987	First and only Native American mayor of Rapid City.
Keith Carlyle	1987	1991	
Edward R. McLaughlin	1991	1997	(born 1928)
Jim Shaw (1)	1997	2001	(1946–2024)
Jerry Munson	2001	2003	(1955–2023) member and president of the Rapid City Common Council (1999–2001) owned a fishing boat dealership and outdoor advertising agency
Jim Shaw (2)	2003	2007	
Alan Hanks	2007	2011	(born 1960)
Sam Kooiker	2011	2015	(born 1974)
Steve Allender	2015	2023	
Jason Salamun	2023		
