= Curt Massie =

American politician

Member of the South Dakota House of Representatives from the 33rd district
- Incumbent
- Assumed office January 10, 2023 Serving with Phil Jensen
- Preceded by: Taffy Howard

Personal details
- Born: September 20, 1962 (age 64)
- Party: Republican
- Education: Black Hills State University

Curt Massie (born September 20, 1962) is an American politician. He serves as a Republican member for the 33rd district of the South Dakota House of Representatives.
