= Chas Fox =

American football player (born 1963)

No. 86
- Position: Wide receiver

Personal information
- Born: October 3, 1963 (age 63); Lafayette, Indiana, U.S.
- Listed height: 5 ft 11 in (1.80 m)
- Listed weight: 180 lb (82 kg)

Career information
- High school: Stevens (Rapid City, South Dakota)
- College: Furman
- NFL draft: 1986: 4th round, 90th overall pick

Career history
- Kansas City Chiefs (1986)*; St. Louis Cardinals (1986); Kansas City Chiefs (1987)*; Buffalo Bills (1987); Kansas City Chiefs (1988)*
- * Offseason or practice squad member only

Career NFL statistics
- Receptions: 5
- Receiving yards: 59
- Touchdowns: 1
- Stats at Pro Football Reference

Charles Eldon Fox III (born October 3, 1963) is an American former professional football player who was a wide receiver for one season with the St. Louis Cardinals of the National Football League (NFL) in 1986, though he also spent time with the Kansas City Chiefs. He played college football for the Furman Paladins.

== Early life ==
Fox was born on October 3, 1963, in Lafayette, Indiana. His father was in the United States Air Force and was stationed at Ellsworth Air Force Base in Rapid City, South Dakota, where Fox attended Stevens High School. He played football and ran track while at Stevens.

== College career ==
Fox attended Furman University, where he played for the Paladins from 1981 to 1985. He set a Southern Conference record for career touchdowns with 28, and numerous Furman records including touchdown receptions, receptions, receiving yards, and yards per game.

In 1983, during a game against East Tennessee State, Fox set the record for the longest pass in Furman history, a 92-yard touchdown pass he caught from quarterback David Charpia. The record still stands as of 2020. In 1984, Fox led the Southern Conference in punt returns. He earned all-South Carolina honors and all-Southern Conference honors in 1984 and 1985.

Fox suffered a knee injury after starting nine games of the Paladins' 1985 season and was sidelined for the remainder of his college football career.

In addition to playing football, Fox also participated on the Furman track team, setting a school record in the sprint medley relay. In 1985, he was selected the most valuable player of the track team. Fox was inducted into the Furman Athletics Hall of Fame in 1994.

=== College football statistics ===
Year	Games		Receiving				
Year	GP	GS	Rec	Yds	Avg	TD	Long
1981	3	0	–	–	–	–	–
1982	11	0	10	195	19.5	2	43
1983	11	11	24	478	19.9	5	92
1984	11	11	38	723	19.0	8	90
1985	9	9	34	649	19.1	11	70
Career	45	31	106	2,045	19.3	26	92

== Professional football career ==
=== New Jersey Generals ===
Fox was selected in the sixth round of the 1985 USFL draft by the New Jersey Generals. However, he did not sign with the team and continued playing at Furman that year.

=== Kansas City Chiefs ===
Fox was selected by the Kansas City Chiefs in the fourth round of the 1986 NFL draft with the 90th pick overall. On June 3, 1986, Fox signed a one-year contract with the Chiefs. However, the Chiefs released him before he played any regular season games with the team.

=== St. Louis Cardinals ===
On September 23, 1986, Fox was signed by the Chiefs' cross-state rival, the St. Louis Cardinals, with which he played one season. In his season with the Cardinals, Fox played in four games, starting three. He recorded five receptions for 59 yards in total, and scored his only NFL touchdown early in the fourth quarter of an October 12 game against the Tampa Bay Buccaneers. He was also used on kick returns, returning the ball for 161 yards in total. The Cardinals waived his contract on October 20.

== After football ==
Fox is the CEO of Micro-Mark, a New Jersey–based company that sells power tools, hand tools, and supplies. He also wrote a book titled You Can't Be Too Fast, about improving speed as an athlete. He also works for Seton Hall University's Stillman School of Business in their Department of Management.

== Personal life ==
Fox is married to former Miss South Carolina Anna Graham Fox, with whom he has two children.
