= James Halley II =

American politician (1854–1920)

James Halley II (January 7, 1854 – February 28, 1920) was a Scottish-born American politician. He was affiliated with the Republican Party and served as mayor of Rapid City from 1884 to 1886. He served as a member of the final Dakota Territorial Legislature convened in 1889, before Dakota Territory was split and admitted to the Union as two states.

== Early life and telegraphy career ==
Halley was born on January 7, 1854, in Stirling. The Halley family moved to Washington, D.C. when James was two years old. Halley's education there included training in telegraphy, and he moved throughout the southern United States at the age of sixteen, returning to Washington at the end of the year. For the following three years, Halley worked as a chief telegraph operator in Cheyenne, Wyoming Territory. Halley subsequently moved to the West Coast, then to Omaha, Nebraska, before returning to Cheyenne in a matter of months. Halley was then hired by a private company. In 1876, he established a private telegraph line for this company between Cheyenne and the Black Hills, including Custer and Deadwood, Dakota Territory.

== Settling in southern Dakota Territory ==
Halley left the private telegraph company in 1879 to work as a teller for the First National Bank of Deadwood through 1880, after which he cofounded a bank in Rapid City. Halley's bank was merged into the First National Bank of Rapid City in 1884. He remained on the bank staff as a cashier until 1898, when he was named the bank's president. Halley also served as president of banks in Hot Springs and Keystone. Outside of the financial sector, Halley was president of the Rapid City Electric Light Company and treasurer of the Rapid River Milling Company.

== Political career ==
Politically, Halley was affiliated with the Republican Party, serving as a central committee member of the South Dakota Republican Party and chaired its Pennington County Central Committee. He attended the Republican National Convention in 1892 and 1900. Between 1884 and 1886, he was mayor of Rapid City, and, in 1889, served in the upper house of the Dakota Territory's legislature, the Dakota Territorial Council.

== Death and legacy ==
Halley died on February 28, 1920 in Battle Creek, Michigan.

Halley Park, named for James Halley II, was established west of Rapid City in 1915. Eleven years later, Alice Gossage supported an effort to repair and move the Pap Madison Cabin to Halley Park. The city government acquired new land for the park in 1939.
