= Gordon Howie =

American politician

Member of the South Dakota Senate from the 30th district
- In office January 2009 – January 11, 2011
- Preceded by: Jim Lintz
- Succeeded by: Bruce Rampelberg

Member of the South Dakota House of Representatives from the 30th district
- In office January 2005 – January 2009 Serving with Gordon Pederson
- Succeeded by: Mike Verchio, Lance Russell

Personal details
- Born: July 23, 1949 (age 77) Rapid City, South Dakota
- Party: Republican
- Spouse: Connie
- Children: 6

Gordon K. Howie (born July 23, 1949) is an American politician from the state of South Dakota. As a member of the Republican Party, he served in the South Dakota House of Representatives and the South Dakota Senate. Howie ran for the Republican nomination for Governor of South Dakota in 2010. He also ran for the U.S. Senate as an Independent in the 2014 elections.

== Political career ==
Howie was elected to the South Dakota House of Representatives in the 2004 elections, serving in that body from 2005 to 2009. He was then elected to the South Dakota Senate in the 2008 elections, serving in that body from 2009 to 2011. In the spring of 2009, he founded and became president of Citizens for Liberty, a conservative group affiliated with the Tea Party movement.

Howie ran for Governor of South Dakota in the 2010 elections, with former State Senator Kermit Staggers as his running mate. Howie finished fourth out of five candidates in the Republican primary, with 10,430 votes (12.4%).

Howie ran unsuccessfully for the United States Senate as an independent in the 2014 elections, losing to former governor Mike Rounds. Howie had indicated that he wanted to ensure there was a "true conservative choice" since the Republican nominee, Governor Rounds, was too moderate. His top priorities included repealing Obamacare and reducing the size of the government. He stated at the time that if elected he would caucus with the Republican Party in the Senate.

== Personal ==
Howie and his wife, Connie, are lifelong residents of South Dakota. They have six children.

In March 2014, Howie pleaded guilty to a misdemeanor big-game hunting violation, for killing a mountain lion found caught in a trap, resulting in a one-year suspension of his hunting and trapping privileges and $284 in fines and court costs.
