= Alice Gossage =

American journalist (1861–1929)

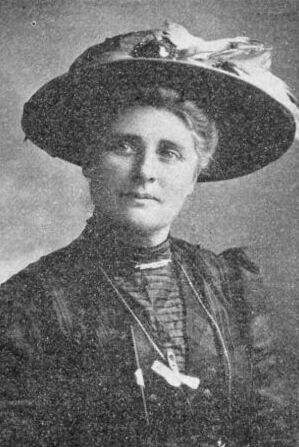
- Gossage in 1910
- Born: Rhoda Alice Bower; November 4, 1861; Dane County, Wisconsin, U.S.
- Died: June 9, 1929 (aged 67); Rapid City, South Dakota, U.S.
- Burial place: Mountain View Cemetery, Rapid City, South Dakota, U.S.
- Occupations: Newspaper editor and journalist
- Years active: 1887–1929
- Known for: Publisher of the Rapid City Journal
- Spouse: Joseph Gossage (m. 1882; died 1927)
- Awards: South Dakota Newspaper Hall of Fame (1934); South Dakota Hall of Fame (1978)

Rhoda Alice Gossage (née Bower; November 4, 1861 – June 9, 1929) was an American newspaper editor, journalist, and activist. Often referred to as the "Mother of Rapid City", she was inducted into the South Dakota Newspaper Hall of Fame in 1934 and the South Dakota Hall of Fame in 1978. She was one of, if not the, first newspaperwomen in South Dakota.

Although born in Wisconsin, Alice spent most of her life in the part of Dakota Territory that would later become South Dakota. Her husband, Joseph Gossage, founded the Rapid City Journal in 1878, and the Gossages ran the newspaper together until 1925. Alice worked as a columnist, editor, publisher, and typesetter for the Journal and other South Dakota publications for over 40 years. Gossage was also involved in several political and activist causes, including women's suffrage and the temperance movement.

== Early life and career ==
Rhoda Alice Bower was born on a farm in Dane County, Wisconsin, on November 4, 1861, the daughter of John Calvin Bower and his wife. She had seven siblings, including Rose Bower, who later became a suffragist. As her mother was often sick, much of the homemaking fell to Alice; and her father reportedly struggled to support his family. When she was five years old, the Bower family first moved to nearby Lodi. They relocated to Vermillion, then part of Dakota Territory, in 1869 or 1870. Alice received a first grade teaching certificate at age 14, and within a year she had begun teaching.

Her first newspaper jobs were as a typesetter for the Vermillion Standard and Dakota Republican in Vermillion; as either paper alone did not have enough work for her, she worked at the Standard three days a week and at the Republican two days a week. Alice began working at the Standard at the age of 15, and her employment—as well as that of another 15-year-old girl—"caused a fervor". She also began working for the Parker New Era in Parker in 1880.

In 1879, she began corresponding with Joseph Gossage, who had founded the Black Hills Journal—which would later become the Rapid City Journal—on the other side of the state. Joseph initially contacted Alice to offer her a job at the new paper. While he ended up not hiring her, they began writing to each other regularly, exchanging hundreds of letters over the course of their courtship. They were married on June 6, 1882, in Vermillion. After a wedding trip, the Gossages arrived in Rapid City together on July 2.

== Rapid City Journal ==
Five years into the Gossages' marriage, Joseph became chronically ill. His deteriorating health propelled Alice into larger and varied roles at the newspaper. Joseph had expanded the paper from a once-weekly to a daily publication in 1886, and Alice oversaw much of this process. She variably worked as a typesetter, columnist, publisher, bookkeeper, and manager, taking on any role that needed to be filled. This early work as a chief operator of a widely distributed publication made her one of the first newspaperwomen in South Dakota. Alice signed her columns with her initials "A.G."

During her career, Alice took on additional work for various other South Dakotan publications. She worked as a typesetter for the Mitchell Daily Republic and was an early contributor to the formation of the South Dakota Press Association.

The Gossages were the sole owners of the Rapid City Journal until 1922, when they sold a one-fourth share to Journal Publishing Company. They decided to sell the newspaper to the Lusk-Mitchell Corporation in 1925, but the Gossages retained their positions at the paper. Alice continued to work as the chief editorial standby. Joseph Gossage died on February 2, 1927.

== Personal life ==
Prior to her marriage to Joseph Gossage, Alice was engaged twice. She was first engaged to Major Henry McNamara, a writer and lawyer from nearby Yankton. Upon discovering he had lied about his temperance, Alice broke off the engagement. She was then engaged to John Parson, a physician, but sometime after his sentencing to state prison for a drunken crime, their betrothal ended.

Alice married Joseph Gossage on June 6, 1882. They had no children, by their own choice. As Alice had played an active role in the rearing of her siblings and had made sacrifices to her own education and career to do so, and having observed her mother's declining health after repeated childbirth, Alice did not desire children of her own, a view Joseph shared.

Gossage was a Congregationalist and took on a prominent role in church life. In Vermillion, she played the church organ and taught Sunday school. After her arrival in Rapid City, she resumed her post as a Sunday school teacher, a role she filled for over 40 years; and contributed in several other ways to her church.

=== Activism ===
Besides her journalism career, Gossage was involved with several charitable organizations and activism efforts, including the women's suffrage and temperance movements. By 1892, Gossage was second vice president of the State Equal Suffrage Association.

Gossage was a lifelong supporter of temperance, a stance passed down to her by her parents. In 1895, Gossage was elected president of the Black Hills district of the Woman's Christian Temperance Union. She also edited the organization's South Dakota newspaper, The White Ribbon, for two years.

Gossage founded the local Sunshine Society, which collected and distributed necessities for the poor and distributed them from inside the offices of the Rapid City Journal. She was also a public school teacher, as well as provided music lessons. She also provided lodging at her residence for rural girls coming to Rapid City to attend school, and trained them in housekeeping until they could find a more long-term boarding solution.

=== Historic preservation ===
Gossage was very interested in preserving South Dakotan history. In 1926, she financially and politically backed an effort to relocate the Pap Madison Cabin to Halley Park, closer to downtown Rapid City than its original location; this cabin became the first history museum in the Black Hills. The cabin is now part of the Minnilusa Pioneer Museum, located at The Journey Museum and Learning Center. The Journey Museum itself has several artifacts from the Gossages' lives in its collection, including Alice's wedding dress, a printing press and writing desk from the Rapid City Journal, and a fireplace from the Gossages' residence.

== Death and legacy ==
Alice Gossage died on June 9, 1929, in Rapid City, (Note: The South Dakota Hall of Fame claims a death date of March 4, and the 125th anniversary edition of the Rapid City Journal claims June 8, but Gossage's obituary and most other sources state June 9.) of stomach cancer. Her funeral on June 11 was well-attended, and staff members from the Rapid City Journal and students of her Sunday school classes served as pallbearers. Rapid City Mayor T. B. Werner decreed that businesses—including the Journal—be shut during the funeral. Gossage was buried in Mountain View Cemetery in Rapid City.

Gossage has received several posthumous honors and awards. In 1934, she became the first woman inducted into the South Dakota Newspaper Hall of Fame; as part of this honor, a commemorative plaque was installed at the hall of fame's physical location at South Dakota State University. She was inducted into the South Dakota Hall of Fame in 1978.

A granite memorial topped with a sundial was placed along Skyline Drive to commemorate Gossage's lifetime of service to the city. In tandem with their works on the nearby Dinosaur Park, the Works Progress Administration built the memorial for a total cost of $3,318. The dedication ceremony took place on June 5, 1938. This memorial was largely neglected, overshadowed by a communications tower installed in the 1950s, and eventually collapsed. It was rediscovered, rebuilt, and rededicated in 2019.

In 2006, the South Dakota State Historical Society published a collection of letters exchanged between Joseph and Alice Gossage, as well as Alice's personal diary, in a book titled Sunshine Always: The Courtship Letters of Alice Bower and Joseph Gossage of Dakota Territory. The correspondence is dated between 1879 and 1882, during their courtship and the early years of their marriage. Alice's diary contains entries from 1878 to 1883 and details her personal life. These letters and Alice's diary are kept at the South Dakota State Archives.
