= Brian Gosch =

American politician

Member of the South Dakota House of Representatives from the 32nd district
- In office September 2007 – January 2016
- Preceded by: Alan Hanks
- Succeeded by: Sean McPherson

Speaker of the South Dakota House of Representatives
- In office 2013–2015
- Preceded by: Valentine Rausch
- Succeeded by: Dean Wink

Personal details
- Born: May 26, 1971 (age 55) Aberdeen, South Dakota
- Party: Republican
- Education: University of South Dakota School of Law (JD)
- Profession: Attorney

Brian Gregory Gosch (born May 26, 1971) is an American politician and attorney from the state of South Dakota. He was a member of the South Dakota House of Representatives, and served as the Speaker of the House from 2013 to 2015. In November 2014, he was elected as Majority Leader of the South Dakota House of Representatives beginning in the 2015 session. He was replaced as Speaker of the House by Dean Wink.

== Early life, education, and career ==
Gosch was born in Aberdeen, South Dakota. He attended high school at Martin Luther Prep School in Prairie du Chien, Wisconsin. He graduated from the University of South Dakota in 1993 and then attended the University of South Dakota School of Law, graduating in 1996.

== Career ==
He became an attorney for South Dakota Advocacy Services for people with disabilities in Rapid City, South Dakota. He was appointed to the South Dakota House by Governor Mike Rounds in 2007, succeeding Alan Hanks, who resigned his seat after winning the mayoralty of Rapid City. In 2013, Gosch was elected Speaker of the House of Representatives for the 87th Legislative Assembly, a post he held until 2015. The previous year, Gosch proposed classifying texting while driving as a statewide secondary offense.

As of 2025, Gosch serves as a governmental affairs representative and the Minnesota state director for the National Rifle Association of America (NRA).

== Personal life ==
Gosch and his wife, Heather, have six children.
