= Mike Derby =

American businessman and politician

Member of the South Dakota House of Representatives from the 34th district
- Incumbent
- Assumed office January 12, 2021
- Preceded by: Michael Diedrich
- In office 1997–2002

Personal details
- Born: c. 1957 (age 68–69)
- Party: Republican
- Education: University of South Dakota (BS)

Mike Derby (born c. 1957) is an American businessman and politician serving as a member of the South Dakota House of Representatives from the 34th district. Elected in 2020, he assumed office on January 12, 2021.

== Early life and education ==
Derby was raised in Rapid City, South Dakota and graduated from Stevens High School. He earned a Bachelor of Science degree in business administration from the University of South Dakota in 1979.

== Career ==
Derby is the owner of the Canyon Lake Resort in Rapid City. He was also the chair of the Rapid City Area Chamber of Commerce and a board member of Visit Rapid City. Derby served as a member of the South Dakota House of Representatives from 1997 to 2002. During his first tenure, he chaired the Military Affairs Committee and Ellsworth Task Force. He was also the vice chair of the South Dakota Legislative Executive Committee. Derby was re-elected to the South Dakota House of Representatives in 2020. He assumed office on January 12, 2021, succeeding Michael Diedrich.
