= Michael Diedrich =

American politician (1954–2025)

Member of the South Dakota House of Representatives from the 34th district
- In office December 29, 2017 – 2024
- Preceded by: Craig Tieszen
- Succeeded by: Mike Derby

Member of the South Dakota Senate
- In office 1993–1995; 1987–1991

Personal details
- Born: Michael Gordon Diedrich; August 10, 1954 Rapid City, South Dakota, U.S.
- Died: July 13, 2025 (aged 70)
- Party: Republican
- Education: University of South Dakota (BA, JD); Harvard University (MPA); Loyola University Chicago (LLM)

Michael Gordon Diedrich (August 10, 1954 – July 13, 2025) was an American politician and attorney who served as a member of the South Dakota House of Representatives from the 34th district. Diedrich was appointed to the position in 2017 by Governor Dennis Daugaard, succeeding Craig Tieszen, who died in a boating accident on November 23, 2017. He assumed office on December 29, 2017.

== Early life and education ==
Diedrich was born on August 10, 1954. A native of Rapid City, South Dakota, he attended Rapid City Central High School. Diedrich earned a bachelor's degree from University of South Dakota, Juris Doctor from the University of South Dakota School of Law, Master of Public Administration from the John F. Kennedy School of Government, and Master of Laws in healthcare law from the Loyola University Chicago School of Law.

== Career ==
Diedrich served as a member of the South Dakota Senate from 1987 to 1991 and again from 1993 to 1995. Diedrich also worked in the Rapid City attorney's office and as the vice-president of government relations for Regional Health (now Monument Health).

== Death ==
Diedrich died on July 13, 2025, at the age of 70.
