= Stevens High School (South Dakota) =

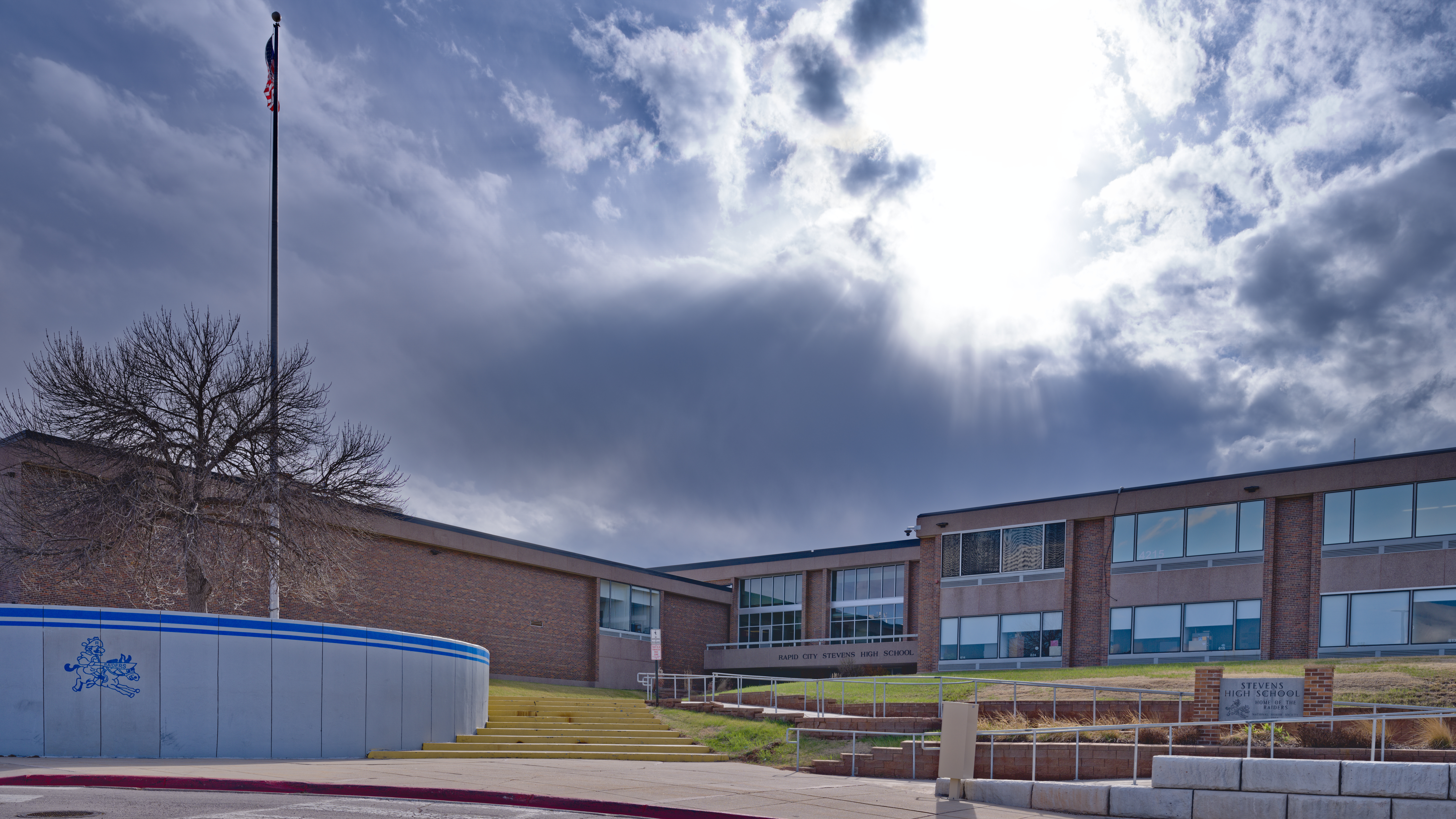

Location
- 1200 44th Street; Rapid City, South Dakota 57702; United States; 44°04′30″N 103°17′23″W

Information
- Type: Public high school
- Established: 1969; 57 years ago
- School district: Rapid City Area Schools
- Principal: Jocelyn Haffner
- Teaching staff: 94.47 (FTE)
- Grades: 9-12
- Enrollment: 1,763 (2023–2024)
- Student to teacher ratio: 18.66
- Colors: Royal blue, white and silver
- Athletics conference: Greater Dakota Conference (GDC)
- Nickname: Raiders
- Website: stevens.rcas.org

Stevens High School is one of three public high schools in Rapid City, South Dakota, United States. The school opened in November 1969, and has an enrollment of approximately 1600 students. The school is situated in the foothills of South Dakota's Black Hills on the city's western outskirts. The school colors are blue and silver, and the school teams and organizations are known as the "Raiders".

== History ==
Stevens High School opened in 1969, the second public high school in Rapid City. Located on the west side of town, it was constructed to accommodate the growing student population. The new school was occupied following Thanksgiving in 1969. Stevens High Schools was named for Paul C. Stevens, a Superintendent of the Rapid City Public Schools for fourteen years. Mr. Stevens helped greatly in making the public aware of the need for another high school in Rapid City and is credited with getting the bond issue for the school passed by an overwhelming majority on the first vote. The school has hosted dignitaries such as Pat Nixon in 1972, and President Bill Clinton in 2008.

=== Hostage and shooting incident ===
On September 11, 1991, Ryan R. Harris walked into a math class at Stevens High School in Rapid City, South Dakota, pulled out a sawed-off shotgun, and ordered the teacher to leave. The teacher complied and Harris held the rest of the class hostage for the next four hours. Harris had been inspired by Stephen King's novel Rage. Harris demanded pizza and cigarettes, which were delivered, and $1 million and a helicopter, which were not. He fired a total of 10 shots in the room, at objects such as the overhead projector and intercom. No students or faculty were injured or killed. Upon receiving the cigarettes he had demanded, Harris set down his shotgun to pull out a lighter and light his cigarette. In this moment, 17-year-old senior Chris Ericks picked up the shotgun and police swarmed in bringing the stand off to an end. Harris was sentenced to probation with strict conditions to participate in psychiatric care. However 7 years later, Harris who was living in North Carolina and involved with a woman who was found shot and killed, engaged police in a 15 hour armed standoff in a convenience store after a traffic stop, ultimately turning his handgun on himself and committing suicide.

== Music program ==
The bands received the John Philip Sousa Foundation's Sudler Flag of Honor, an international award recognizing high school concert bands, in 1985. The marching band performed at the Rose Parade in 1987.

In May 2007, the Jay Sharp Memorial Concert Organ of 103 digital ranks was dedicated in a performance of Saint-Saëns' Organ Symphony #3. Stevens is among a handful of high schools anywhere possessing a large concert organ; a three-manual, 84-stop instrument in the Milo Winter Fine Arts Auditorium. The orchestra regularly fills All State more than any other school. Its success stems from longtime director Bill Evans who started with a group of five players building it over 40 years to a full orchestra with 120 members.

In 2018, the music department received the merit award from the National Association of Music Merchants.

== Notable alumni ==
- Catherine Bach, actress
- Simeon Birnbaum, long-distance runner
- Brett Clark, sociologist
- Dave Collins, professional baseball player
- Jessi Combs, professional racer, television personality, and metal fabricator
- Mike Derby, businessman and member of the South Dakota House of Representatives
- Mark Ellis, professional baseball player
- Chas Fox, professional football player
- Becky Hammon, professional basketball player and coach
- Randy Lewis, Olympic gold medalist-wrestling 1984
- Eric Piatkowski, professional basketball player
- Kelvin Torve, professional baseball player
- Matt Vidal, sociologist
