= Bill Thompson (South Dakota politician) =

American politician

Member of the South Dakota House of Representatives from the 13th district
- In office 2003–2010
- Preceded by: Don Hennies

Personal details
- Born: May 14, 1949 (age 77) Aberdeen, South Dakota
- Party: Democratic
- Spouse: Anne
- Children: Sarah
- Education: Northern State University, University of Kansas
- Profession: educator

William R. Thompson (born May 14, 1949) is an American politician from South Dakota. A member of the Democratic Party, he served in the South Dakota House of Representatives from 2003 to 2010.
