= Arlene Ham =

American politician (born 1936)

Member of the South Dakota Senate from the 32nd district
- In office 1997–2004
- Succeeded by: Stan Adelstein

Personal details
- Born: August 1, 1936 (age 89) Belle Fourche, South Dakota
- Party: Republican
- Children: two
- Profession: Broker, Real Estate

Arlene H. Ham-Burr (born August 1, 1936) is an American former politician. She served in the South Dakota Senate from 1997 to 2004.
