= Mike Verchio =

American politician (born 1944)

Member of the South Dakota House of Representatives from the 30th district
- In office January 2009 – January 2017
- Succeeded by: Tim Goodwin; Julie Frye-Mueller

Personal details
- Born: October 23, 1944 (age 81) Boone, Iowa, U.S.
- Party: Republican
- Website: verchioforhouse.com

Mike Jon Verchio (born October 23, 1944, in Boone, Iowa) is an American politician and a Republican member of the South Dakota House of Representatives representing District 30 since January 2009.

== Elections ==
- 2012 Verchio and fellow incumbent Republican Representative Lance Russell were challenged in the five-way June 5, 2012, Republican Primary where Verchio placed first with 1,716 votes (30.1%); Verchio and Representative Russell were unopposed for the November 6, 2012, General election, where Verchio took the first seat with 7,737 votes (54.4%) and Representative Russell took the second seat.
- 2008 When District 30 incumbent Republican Representatives Gordon Howie and Gordon Pederson both ran for South Dakota Senate and left both District 30 seats open, Verchio ran in the five-way June 3, 2008, Republican Primary and placed second with 1,240 votes (20.2%) ahead of former state Representative Dick Brown, who placed third; in the four-way November 4, 2008, General election Verchio took the first seat with 7,551 votes (35.3%) and fellow Republican nominee Lance Russell took the second seat ahead of Democratic nominees Kathleen Ann and Jacqueline Gerenz.
- 2010 Verchio and incumbent Representative Russell were unopposed for the June 8, 2010, Republican Primary and won the three-way November 2, 2010, General election, where Verchio took the first seat with 7,439 votes (44.1%) and Representative Russell took the second seat ahead of returning 2008 Democratic nominee Kathleen Ann.

== Legislative Activity ==
- 2016 Verchio proposed House Bill 1073, which in some circumstances would require cyclists to pull over and allow cars to pass. Specifically, "If a person is operating a bicycle within a no passing zone on a roadway that has no shoulder or a shoulder of less than three feet in width, the person shall stop the bicycle, move the bicycle off the roadway, and allow a faster vehicle to pass." The website MomentumMag.com called this bill "...probably the most blatant attempt one could make at getting cyclists off of the roads short of straight-up making bicycles illegal."
