= Scott Craig =

American politician (born 1964)

Member of the South Dakota House of Representatives from the 33rd district
- In office January 11, 2013 – 2017 Serving with Jacqueline Sly
- Preceded by: Phil Jensen
- Succeeded by: Taffy Howard; David Johnson

Personal details
- Born: July 19, 1964 (age 62) Hollywood, California, U.S.
- Party: Republican
- Profession: Pastor
- Website: http://landmarkcommunity.church/

Scott W. Craig is an American politician, Taekwondo Grand Master and was a Republican member of the South Dakota House of Representatives representing District 33 from January 11, 2013 to 2017. He is the pastor of Landmark Community Church.

== Elections ==
- 2012 When incumbent Republican Representative Phil Jensen ran for South Dakota Senate and left a District 33 seat open, Craig ran in the June 5, 2012 Republican Primary; in the three-way November 6, 2012 General election, incumbent Republican Representative Jacqueline Sly took the first seat and Craig took the second seat with 4,905 votes (33.62%) ahead of Democratic nominee Robin Page.
