= Lance Russell (politician) =

American politician

Member of the South Dakota Senate from the 30th district
- In office January 2017 – January 2021
- Preceded by: Bruce Rampelberg
- Succeeded by: Julie Frye-Mueller

Member of the South Dakota House of Representatives from the 30th district
- In office January 2009 – January 2017 Serving with Mike Verchio
- Succeeded by: Julie Frye-Mueller; Tim Goodwin

Personal details
- Born: November 8, 1969 (age 56)
- Party: Republican
- Spouse: Starla
- Education: University of South Dakota (JD); University of Denver (LLM)

Lance S. Russell (born November 8, 1969) is an American politician and a Republican member of the South Dakota Senate. He is a former member of the South Dakota House of Representatives representing District 30.

== Early life and education ==
Russell graduated from the University of South Dakota School of Law in 2001.

== Elections ==
=== State House of Representatives (2009–2017) ===
- 2008 When District 30 incumbent Republican Representatives Gordon Howie and Gordon Pederson both ran for South Dakota Senate and left both District 30 seats open, Russell ran in the five-way June 3, 2008 Republican Primary and placed first with 1,651 votes (26.9%) ahead of former state Representative Dick Brown, who placed third. In the four-way November 4, 2008 General election fellow Republican nominee Mike Verchio took the first seat and Russell took the second seat with 6,554 votes (30.68%) ahead of Democratic nominees Kathleen Ann and Jacqueline Gerenz.
- 2010 Russell and incumbent Representative Verchio were unopposed for the June 8, 2010 Republican Primary and won the three-way November 2, 2010 General election, where Representative Verchio took the first seat, and Russell took the second seat with 5,829 votes (34.55%) ahead of returning 2008 Democratic nominee Kathleen Ann.
- 2012 Russell and fellow incumbent Republican Representative Mike Verchio were challenged in the five-way June 5, 2012 Republican Primary where Verchio placed first and Russell placed second with 1,433 votes (25.2%); Verchio and Representative Russell were unopposed for the November 6, 2012 General election, where Representative Verchio took the first seat and Russell took the second seat with 6,481 votes (45.6%).
- 2014 A primary election took place on June 3, 2014. The general election took place on November 4, 2014. The signature filing deadline for candidates wishing to run in this election was March 25, 2014. Incumbents Mike Verchio and Lance Russell defeated Julie Frye-Mueller in the Republican primary. Gardner Gray ran as an independent candidate. Russell and Verchio defeated Gray in the general election.

=== State Senate Elections of 2016 and 2018 ===
- 2016 Russell was elected to the State Senate by defeating incumbent state Senator Bruce Rampelberg in the Republican primary, with Russell receiving 2,396 (59.20%) votes, and Bruce received 1,651 (40.80%) votes. Russell then went on to win the general election with 9,176 (71.53%) votes to 3,653 (28.47%) votes for Democrat Karla R. LaRive.
- 2018 Russell was challenged by Rampelberg in a rematch of the Republican primary, and Republican Patricia Shiery also participated in the primary. Russell won the primary with 2,547 (58.1%) votes; Rampelberg received 1,283 (29.3%) votes, and Shiery received 556 (12.7%) votes. Russell would resign his nomination in seeking the Republican nomination for Attorney General of South Dakota. He lost the Republican convention for Attorney General, but he would be re-nominated by the central committees of District 30. Russell would then go on to win the general election with 6,652 (56.7%) votes, Democrat Kristine Winter received 2,943 (25.1%) votes, and Libertarian Gideon Oakes received 2,134 (18.2%) votes.

=== Attorney General Election of 2018 ===
In 2018, Russell ran for Attorney General of South Dakota. He was one of four Republicans running at the Republican Convention. He survived the first round of voting, securing 27% of the vote, but he was defeated in the second round by the eventual nominee and later Attorney General Jason Ravnsborg by a margin of 63% to 37%.

South Dakota Attorney General, Republican Convention Election 2018, Final Round
Party	Candidate	%
Republican	Jason Ravnsborg	63%
Republican	Lance Russell	37%

South Dakota Attorney General, Republican Convention Election 2018, First Round
Party	Candidate	%
Republican	Jason Ravnsborg	47%
Republican	Lance Russell	27%
Republican	John Fitzgerald	26%

=== Fall River State's Attorney ===
In 2020, after initially filing for a third term in the state senate, Russell withdrew and then filed to be the Fall River state's attorney.

== Legal Controversy ==
=== Public Legal Censure ===
In 2011, Russell was sanctioned by the Supreme Court of South Dakota, In re: the Discipline of Lance Russell, in connection with his handling of two cases while he was State's Attorney in 2008. One was in connection with a grand jury investigation regarding the scope and quality of the contractor's work on a local golf course. The other regarded a press release that criticized a sitting judge and implied the judge was improperly delaying setting a trial date. He received a public censure.

== Political Controversy ==
=== Banned from the Caucus ===
In 2012, as a member of the State House of Representatives, Russell was banned from the Republican Caucus along with Rep. Stace Nelson.

=== Running for two offices at the same time ===
In 2018, a controversy arose as Russell was running for both the state senate and the office of Attorney General at the same time, in contrast to South Dakota law. The Secretary of State Shantel Krebs determined that Russell could not run for two offices at once and would have to choose which office he would run for before the convention vote for Attorney General. On June 22, 2018, Russell resigned his nomination for State Senate at the Secretary of State's office. On June 23, 2018, Russell would go on to place second in the race for Attorney General. Some parties argued that SDCL 12-6-55 forbade Russell from putting his name back on the ballot as it stated: "No name so withdrawn shall be printed on the ballots to be used at such election." A court proceeding determined that Russell could be re-nominated for his state senate position, and eventually, he was re-nominated and won the general election to reclaim a seat in the state senate.
