= 2010 South Dakota gubernatorial election =

- November 2, 2010
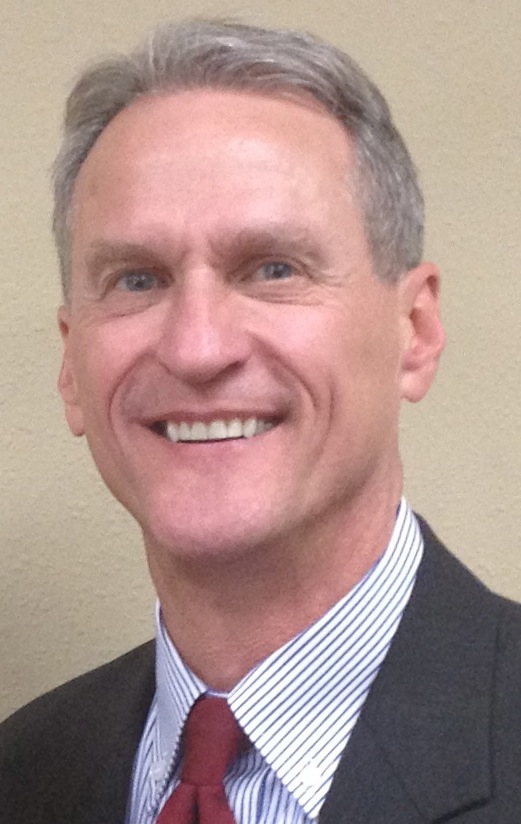

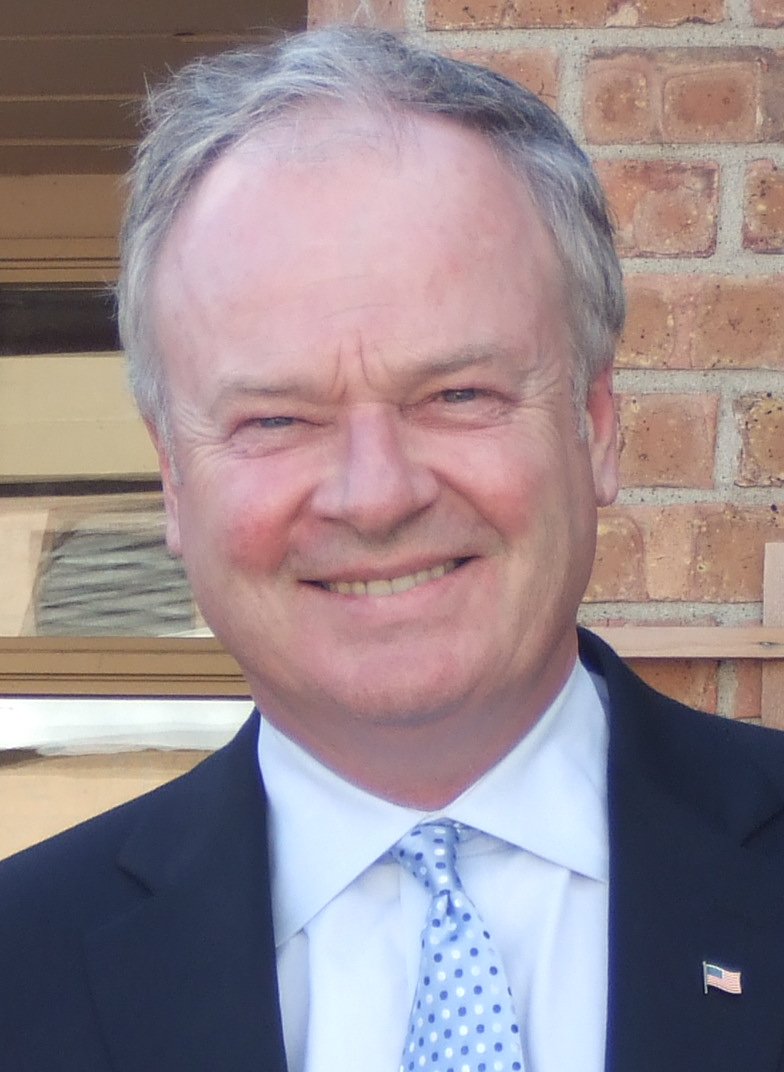
Nominee	Dennis Daugaard	Scott Heidepriem
Party	Republican	Democratic
Running mate	Matt Michels	Ben Arndt
Popular vote	195,024	122,010
Percentage	61.51%	38.49%
- County results Daugaard: 50–60% 60–70% 70–80% Heidepreim: 50–60% 60–70% 70–80% 80–90%
Governor before election
Mike Rounds
Republican
Elected Governor
Dennis Daugaard
Republican

The 2010 South Dakota gubernatorial election was held on November 2, 2010, to elect the governor of South Dakota to a four-year term. Incumbent Republican Governor Mike Rounds was ineligible to run for re-election due to term limits.

Republican candidate Dennis Daugaard was elected, defeating Democratic candidate Scott Heidepriem.

== Republican primary ==
=== Candidates ===
- Dennis Daugaard, lieutenant governor
- Gordon Howie, state senator
- Dave Knudson, State Senate majority leader
- Ken Knuppe, rancher
- Scott Munsterman, former mayor of Brookings

=== Results ===
Primary results by county Daugaard: 60–70%; 50–60%; 40–50%; <40%; Munsterman: <40%; 40–50%; 50–60%; Howie: 30–40%; Knuppe: <30%

Republican primary results
Party	Candidate	Votes	%
Republican	Dennis Daugaard	42,266	50.4
Republican	Scott Munsterman	14,733	17.6
Republican	Dave Knudson	13,217	15.8
Republican	Gordon Howie	10,430	12.4
Republican	Ken Knuppe	3,186	3.8
Total votes		83,832	100

== Democratic primary ==
=== Candidate ===
- Scott Heidepriem, State Senate minority leader

=== Results ===
Heidepriem faced no opposition in the Democratic primary.

== General election ==
=== Predictions ===
Source	Ranking	As of
Cook Political Report	Likely R	October 14, 2010
Rothenberg	Safe R	October 28, 2010
RealClearPolitics	Safe R	November 1, 2010
Sabato's Crystal Ball	Likely R	October 28, 2010
CQ Politics	Likely R	October 28, 2010

=== Polling ===
Poll source	Dates administered	Dennis Daugaard (R)	Scott Heidepriem (D)
Nielson Brothers Polling	October 20–22, 2010	43%	40%
Rasmussen Reports	October 20, 2010	55%	36%
Rasmussen Reports	October 9, 2010	57%	37%
Rasmussen Reports	September 8, 2010	57%	28%
Rasmussen Reports	August 3, 2010	59%	27%
Rasmussen Reports	July 6, 2010	52%	35%
Rasmussen Reports	June 10, 2010	52%	36%
Rasmussen Reports	May 26, 2010	51%	36%
Rasmussen Reports	April 21, 2010	53%	33%
Rasmussen Reports	March 25, 2010	49%	32%
Rasmussen Reports	February 23, 2010	41%	32%
Public Policy Polling	December 10–13, 2009	42%	29%

=== Results ===
2010 South Dakota gubernatorial election
Party	Candidate	Votes	%	±%
Republican	Dennis Daugaard	195,046	61.51%	−0.18%
Democratic	Scott Heidepriem	122,037	38.49%	+2.36%
Total votes		317,083	100.00%	N/A
Republican hold				

==== By county ====
County	Dennis Daugaard Republican		Scott Heidepriem Democratic		Margin		Total
County	#	%	#	%	#	%	Total
Aurora	788	57.10%	592	42.90%	196	14.20%	1,380
Beadle	3,931	57.11%	2,952	42.89%	979	14.22%	6,883
Bennett	619	59.86%	415	40.14%	204	19.73%	1,034
Bon Homme	1,553	55.27%	1,257	44.73%	296	10.53%	2,810
Brookings	6,555	59.45%	4,471	40.55%	2,084	18.90%	11,026
Brown	8,541	59.49%	5,816	40.51%	2,725	18.98%	14,357
Brule	1,301	61.14%	827	38.86%	474	22.27%	2,128
Buffalo	124	27.74%	323	72.26%	-199	-44.52%	447
Butte	2,575	70.16%	1,095	29.84%	1,480	40.33%	3,670
Campbell	616	78.77%	166	21.23%	450	57.54%	782
Charles Mix	2,107	60.23%	1,391	39.77%	716	20.47%	3,498
Clark	979	58.24%	702	41.76%	277	16.48%	1,681
Clay	2,302	49.60%	2,339	50.40%	-37	-0.80%	4,641
Codington	6,352	61.91%	3,908	38.09%	2,444	23.82%	10,260
Corson	425	49.94%	426	50.06%	-1	-0.12%	851
Custer	2,598	65.94%	1,342	34.06%	1,256	31.88%	3,940
Davison	4,575	63.16%	2,668	36.84%	1,907	26.33%	7,243
Day	1,321	48.32%	1,413	51.68%	-92	-3.37%	2,734
Deuel	1,184	58.12%	853	41.88%	331	16.25%	2,037
Dewey	655	42.62%	882	57.38%	-227	-14.77%	1,537
Douglas	1,255	76.01%	396	23.99%	859	52.03%	1,651
Edmunds	1,131	63.50%	650	36.50%	481	27.01%	1,781
Fall River	2,025	66.03%	1,042	33.97%	983	32.05%	3,067
Faulk	693	63.75%	394	36.25%	299	27.51%	1,087
Grant	2,087	60.37%	1,370	39.63%	717	20.74%	3,457
Gregory	1,307	63.94%	737	36.06%	570	27.89%	2,044
Haakon	783	76.09%	246	23.91%	537	52.19%	1,029
Hamlin	1,692	64.24%	942	35.76%	750	28.47%	2,634
Hand	967	52.58%	872	47.42%	95	5.17%	1,839
Hanson	1,170	67.79%	556	32.21%	614	35.57%	1,726
Harding	465	69.30%	206	30.70%	259	38.60%	671
Hughes	5,626	72.94%	2,087	27.06%	3,539	45.88%	7,713
Hutchinson	2,091	65.94%	1,080	34.06%	1,011	31.88%	3,171
Hyde	483	67.36%	234	32.64%	249	34.73%	717
Jackson	614	64.70%	335	35.30%	279	29.40%	949
Jerauld	611	54.21%	516	45.79%	95	8.43%	1,127
Jones	427	73.75%	152	26.25%	275	47.50%	579
Kingsbury	1,426	57.92%	1,036	42.08%	390	15.84%	2,462
Lake	3,225	62.62%	1,925	37.38%	1,300	25.24%	5,150
Lawrence	6,397	63.19%	3,726	36.81%	2,671	26.39%	10,123
Lincoln	11,831	66.03%	6,087	33.97%	5,744	32.06%	17,918
Lyman	840	60.78%	542	39.22%	298	21.56%	1,382
Marshall	965	52.47%	874	47.53%	91	4.95%	1,839
McCook	1,517	60.58%	987	39.42%	530	21.17%	2,504
McPherson	901	75.40%	294	24.60%	607	50.79%	1,195
Meade	6,447	69.40%	2,843	30.60%	3,604	38.79%	9,290
Mellette	402	54.03%	342	45.97%	60	8.06%	744
Miner	595	53.27%	522	46.73%	73	6.54%	1,117
Minnehaha	38,314	59.09%	26,528	40.91%	11,786	18.18%	64,842
Moody	1,534	56.19%	1,196	43.81%	338	12.38%	2,730
Pennington	24,443	66.49%	12,319	33.51%	12,124	32.98%	36,762
Perkins	843	62.35%	509	37.65%	334	24.70%	1,352
Potter	936	71.45%	374	28.55%	562	42.90%	1,310
Roberts	1,852	48.63%	1,956	51.37%	-104	-2.73%	3,808
Sanborn	673	58.17%	484	41.83%	189	16.34%	1,157
Shannon	423	17.76%	1,959	82.24%	-1,536	-64.48%	2,382
Spink	1,644	56.28%	1,277	43.72%	367	12.56%	2,921
Stanley	950	66.85%	471	33.15%	479	33.71%	1,421
Sully	529	71.49%	211	28.51%	318	42.97%	740
Todd	630	32.24%	1,324	67.76%	-694	-35.52%	1,954
Tripp	1,745	69.52%	765	30.48%	980	39.04%	2,510
Turner	2,290	60.34%	1,505	39.66%	785	20.69%	3,795
Union	3,874	64.83%	2,102	35.17%	1,772	29.65%	5,976
Walworth	1,595	71.69%	630	28.31%	965	43.37%	2,225
Yankton	5,406	62.67%	3,220	37.33%	2,186	25.34%	8,626
Ziebach	291	43.63%	376	56.37%	-85	-12.74%	667
Totals	195,046	61.51%	122,037	38.49%	73,009	23.03%	317,083

==== Counties that flipped from Republican to Democratic ====
- Corson (Largest city: McLaughlin)
- Day (largest city: Webster)
- Dewey (largest city: North Eagle Butte)
- Roberts (largest city: Sisseton)
- Ziebach (largest city: Dupree)
