= Don Van Etten =

American politician (1934–2024)

Member of the South Dakota House of Representatives from the 33rd district
- In office 2001–2008

Personal details
- Born: March 10, 1934 Orange City, Iowa, U.S.
- Died: September 23, 2024 (aged 90)
- Party: Republican
- Spouse: Verla
- Children: 4
- Profession: Surgeon

Donald D. Van Etten (March 10, 1934 – September 23, 2024) was an American politician. He served in the South Dakota House of Representatives from 2001 to 2008.

Etten died on September 23, 2024, at the age of 90.
