= David Lust =

American politician (1968–2021)

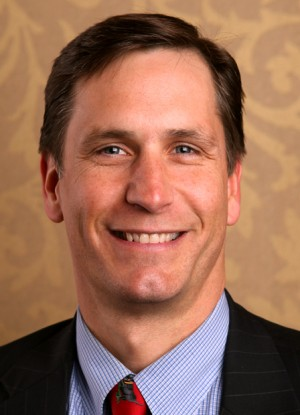
- Lust in 2011

Member of the South Dakota House of Representatives from the 34th district
- In office September 26, 2016 – January 2019
- Preceded by: Dan Dryden
- Succeeded by: Jess Olson
- In office January 9, 2007 – January 13, 2015
- Preceded by: Elizabeth Kraus
- Succeeded by: Jeff Partridge

Personal details
- Born: March 22, 1968 Aberdeen, South Dakota, U.S.
- Died: July 23, 2021 (aged 53) Rapid City, South Dakota
- Party: Republican
- Spouse: Rebecca (m. 1989)
- Children: 4
- Education: Dartmouth College (BA); University of South Dakota (JD)

David Ellwood Lust (March 22, 1968 – July 23, 2021) was an American politician who served as a member of the South Dakota House of Representatives representing District 34 from January 2007 until January 2015 and again from September 2016 until January 2019.

== Early life and education ==
Lust was born in Aberdeen, South Dakota. He earned a Bachelor of Arts degree in government from Dartmouth College. He worked at an international development consulting firm in Chicago, Illinois for three years before returning to South Dakota to attend the University of South Dakota School of Law, graduating with a Juris Doctor in 1997.

== Career ==
Lust graduated from the University of South Dakota School of Law in 1997. He served as a judicial law clerk for Judge Richard Battey of the United States District Court for the District of South Dakota. He also worked as a partner at Gunderson, Palmer, Nelson & Ashmore, LLP.

When incumbent Republican Representative Elizabeth Kraus resigned from the South Dakota House of Representatives, Lust and incumbent Representative Ed McLaughlin were unopposed for the June 6, 2006 Republican primary, and won the November 7, 2006 general election, where Lust took the first seat with 5,576 votes (33.9%) and Representative McLaughlin took the second seat ahead of Democratic nominees Suzy Dennis and Justin Lena. Lust was re-elected in 2008, 2010, and 2012. He left office in January 2015.

Lust served as House Majority Whip in the 2009 and 2010 legislative sessions, and as House Majority Leader from 2011 to 2014.

On September 26, 2016, Lust was appointed by Governor Dennis Daugaard to replace Rep. Dan Dryden in the South Dakota House of Representatives. He served until January 2019.

== Death ==
He died of a cardiac event on July 23, 2021, in Rapid City, South Dakota, at age 53.
