= Royal McCracken =

American politician

Mac McCracken

Member of the South Dakota Senate from the 34th district
- In office 2001–2008

Personal details
- Born: November 16, 1941 Madison, South Dakota
- Died: June 6, 2025 Rapid City, South Dakota
- Party: Republican
- Spouse: Beverly
- Children: two
- Profession: executive

Royal G. "Mac" McCracken (November 16, 1941 – June 6, 2025) was an American former politician. He served in the South Dakota Senate from 2001 to 2008.
