= Tim Goodwin (South Dakota politician) =

American politician and businessman

Member of the South Dakota House of Representatives from the 30th district
- Incumbent
- Assumed office January 10, 2017 Serving with Trish Ladner
- Preceded by: Lance Russell; Mike Verchio

Personal details
- Born: Timothy R. Goodwin; May 6, 1955 (age 71) Minneapolis, Minnesota
- Party: Republican
- Spouse: Marcia
- Children: 8

Military service
- Branch/service: United States Army
- Rank: Lieutenant Colonel
- Unit: 82nd Airborne Division

Timothy R. Goodwin (born May 6, 1955) is an American politician and businessman serving as a member of the South Dakota House of Representatives from the 30th district. A Republican, Goodwin assumed office on January 10, 2017.

== Background ==
Goodwin was born in Minneapolis, Minnesota. At the age of 18, enlisted in the United States Army as a member of the 82nd Airborne Division. After serving in the Army for 24 years, Goodwin retired with the rank of Lieutenant colonel. Prior to serving in the South Dakota House, Goodwin worked as a salesman. Since 2019, Goodwin has served as one of four Majority Whips in the South Dakota House of Representatives.

Goodwin and his wife, Marcia, have eight children.

== Election history ==
2020 South Dakota House of Representatives District 30 General election
Party	Candidate	Votes	%
Republican	Trish Ladner	8,668	50.68%
Republican	Tim Goodwin (incumbent)	8,435	49.32%
Total votes		17,103	100.0%
Republican hold			
Republican hold			
