= Rapid City Journal =

Newspaper in Rapid City, South Dakota

- Type: Daily newspaper
- Format: Broadsheet
- Owner: Lee Enterprises
- Founder(s): George G. Darrow; Joseph B. Gossage
- Publisher: Ben Rogers
- Editor: Michael Brownlee
- Founded: 5 January 1878 (as the Black Hills Journal)
- Language: English
- Headquarters: 507 Main Street; Rapid City, South Dakota 57701; USA
- Circulation: 15,557 Daily (as of 2023)
- Sister newspapers: Chadron (Neb.) Record
- ISSN: 1079-3410
- OCLC number: 2250546
- Website: rapidcityjournal.com

The Rapid City Journal (formerly the Black Hills Journal and the Rapid City Daily Journal) is the daily newspaper of Rapid City, South Dakota. It covers Mount Rushmore, the Black Hills, the Sturgis Motorcycle Rally, and the Pine Ridge Indian Reservation.

The newspaper also publishes two special supplements: the Sturgis Rally Daily, which is published during the annual Sturgis Motorcycle Rally; and Compass, which is the weekly shoppers tab.

The Rapid City Journal Media Group also publishes one weekly newspaper, The Chadron Record in Chadron, Nebraska. Michael Brownlee is the executive editor.

== History ==
On January 5, 1878, George G. Darrow and Joseph B. Gossage published the first edition of the weekly Black Hills Journal. The two co-owned the Sydney Telegraph. That April, the two founders dissolved their partnership. Darrow took possession of the Telegraph and Gossage kept the Journal.

On Feb. 2, 1886, Gossage launched a daily edition of the paper called The Rapid City Daily Journal. He continued to publish the paper with his wife Alice Gossage until 1925, when the couple sold the business to a company operated by Charles H.J. Mitchell and W.C. Lusk, owners of the Yankton Daily Press & Dakotan. Mr. Gossage died in 1927, and Mrs. Gossage died in 1929. The weekly Journal edition ceased in 1930.

E.F. Lusk eventually took over as publisher and held that position for 14 years. In 1939, Rufus W. Hitchcock, owner of the Hibbing Daily Tribune, along with James Early and E.H. Lighter, acquired the Journal. In 1961, Hitchcock died. In December 1964, the Journal was sold by Mrs. Jean Morrell and Mrs. E.H. Lighter to the Cowles Media Company. On February 26, 1990, Lee Enterprises acquired the Journal for $45 million.

Starting June 13, 2023, the print edition of the newspaper will be reduced to three days a week: Tuesday, Thursday and Saturday. Also, the newspaper will switched from carrier to postal delivery.

== Publishers ==
1. Joseph B. Gossage - January 1878 to April 1925
2. Alice Gossage - April 1925 to June 1925
3. Charles Mitchell - June 1925 to April 1926
4. E.F. "Ted" Lusk - June 1925 to April 1939
5. R.W. Hitchcock - April 1939 to February 1961
6. Jean Hitchcock Mitchell - February 1961 to December 1964
7. Willis Brown - December 1964 to September 1968
8. Joyce A. Swan September 1968 to May 1971
9. James W. "Rusty" Swan - May 1971 to November 1985
10. David C. Sharp - November 1985 to April 1993
11. Loretta Lynde - May 1993 to September 1994
12. John Van Strydonck - October 1994 to September 2000
13. Bill Masterson, Jr. - September 2000 to September 2006
14. Rosanne Cheeseman - November 2006 to October 2007
15. Brad Slater - October 2007 to June 2011
16. Shannon Brinker - November 2011 to May 2017
17. Eugene Jackson - May 2017 to March 2018
18. Matthew Tranquill - January 2019 to January 2021
19. Bill Masterson, Jr. - January 2021 to January 2022
20. Ben Rogers - January 2022 to present

== See also ==
- List of newspapers in South Dakota
