= 2016 United States Senate election in South Dakota =

- November 8, 2016
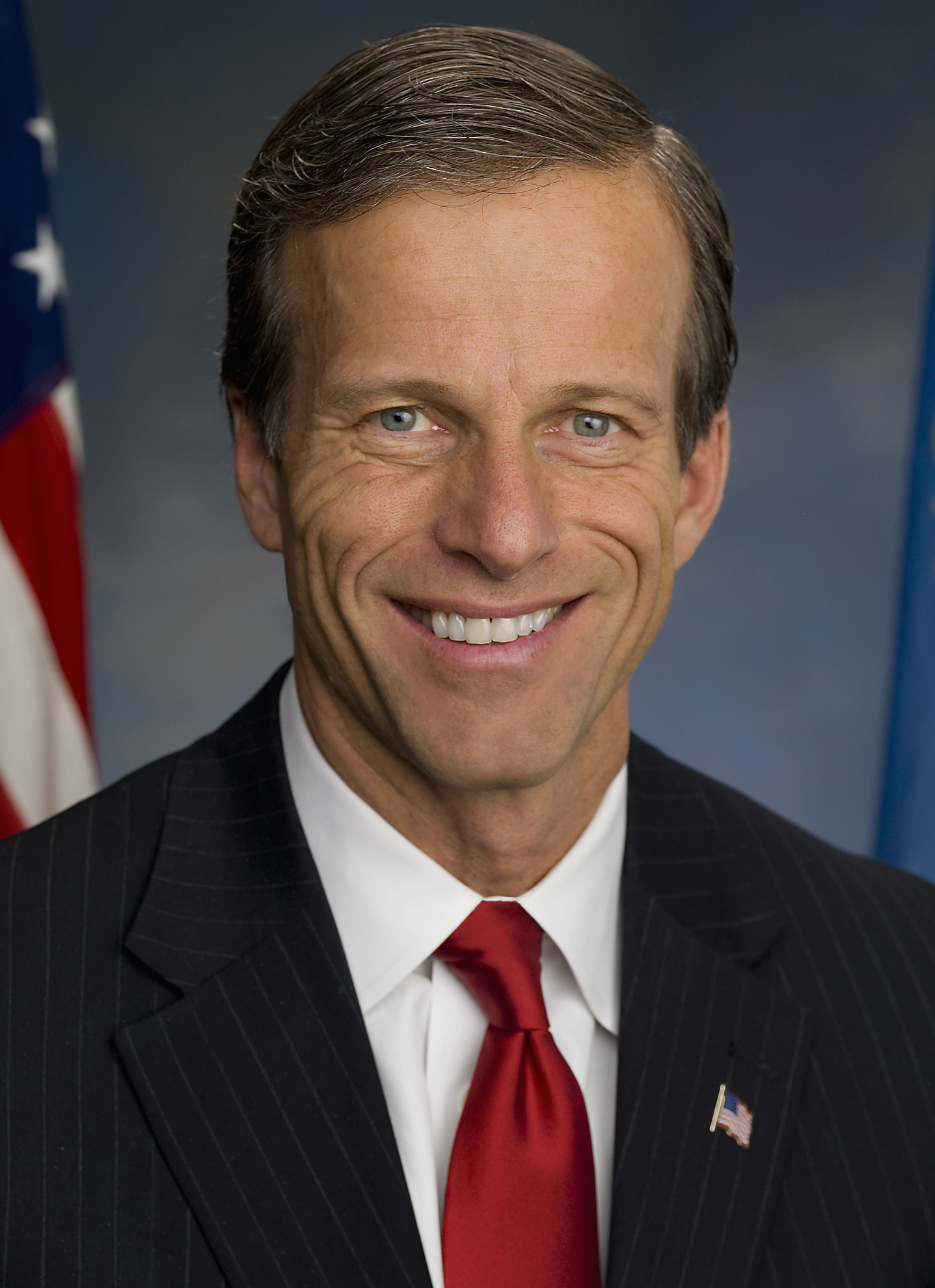

Nominee	John Thune	Jay Williams
Party	Republican	Democratic
Popular vote	265,516	104,140
Percentage	71.83%	28.17%
- Thune: 50–60% 60–70% 70–80% 80–90% >90% Williams: 50–60% 60–70% 70–80% 80–90%
U.S. senator before election
John Thune
Republican
Elected U.S. Senator
John Thune
Republican

The 2016 United States Senate election in South Dakota was held November 8, 2016, to elect a member of the United States Senate to represent the State of South Dakota, concurrently with the 2016 U.S. presidential election, as well as other elections to the United States Senate in other states and elections to the United States House of Representatives and various state and local elections. The primaries were held June 7.

Incumbent Republican Senator John Thune was considered a potential 2016 presidential candidate, but decided instead to run for a third term in office.

== Republican primary ==
=== Candidates ===
==== Declared ====
- John Thune, incumbent U.S. Senator

==== Declined ====
- Gordon Howie, former state senator, candidate for governor in 2010 and Independent candidate for the U.S. Senate in 2014
- Stace Nelson, former state representative and candidate for the U.S. Senate in 2014

== Democratic primary ==
=== Candidates ===
==== Declared ====
- Jay Williams, Chair of the Yankton County Democratic Party, former Yankton School Board member and candidate for the State House in 2010 and 2014

==== Declined ====
- Tom Daschle, former U.S. Senator
- Cory Heidelberger, teacher and political activist (running for State Senate)
- Stephanie Herseth Sandlin, former U.S. Representative
- Mike Huether, Mayor of Sioux Falls
- Bernie Hunhoff, state senator and candidate for governor in 1998
- Sam Hurst, filmmaker and television news producer
- Brendan Johnson, former United States Attorney for the District of South Dakota
- Frank Kloucek, former state senator
- Phil Schreck, KSFY-TV senior meteorologist
- Billie Sutton, Minority Leader of the South Dakota Senate
- Rick Weiland, businessman, nominee for SD-AL in 1996 and candidate in 2002 and nominee for U.S. Senate in 2014

== Constitution Party ==
The Constitution Party nominated Kurt Evans for Senate depending on the resolution of a ballot-access legal action, however, the party's request to place a candidate on the ballot was not granted.

== General election ==
=== Debates ===
- Complete video of debate, October 13, 2016
- Complete video of debate, October 23, 2016

=== Polling ===
Poll source	Date(s) administered	Sample size	Margin of error	John Thune (R)	Jay Williams (D)	Undecided
SurveyMonkey	November 1–7, 2016	459	± 4.6%	65%	31%	4%
SurveyMonkey	October 31–November 6, 2016	435	± 4.6%	64%	31%	5%
SurveyMonkey	October 28–November 3, 2016	393	± 4.6%	66%	29%	5%
SurveyMonkey	October 27–November 2, 2016	345	± 4.6%	67%	30%	3%
SurveyMonkey	October 26–November 1, 2016	281	± 4.6%	65%	32%	3%
SurveyMonkey	October 25–31, 2016	298	± 4.6%	67%	31%	2%
Nielson Brothers Polling	October 24–26, 2016	600	± 4.0%	54%	35%	11%
Remington Research Group	October 19–21, 2016	1,115	± 3.0%	57%	36%	7%
Mason-Dixon	October 18–20, 2016	400	± 5.0%	65%	27%	8%

=== Predictions ===
Source	Ranking	As of
The Cook Political Report	Safe R	November 2, 2016
Sabato's Crystal Ball	Safe R	November 7, 2016
Rothenberg Political Report	Safe R	November 3, 2016
Daily Kos	Safe R	November 8, 2016
Real Clear Politics	Safe R	November 7, 2016

=== Results ===
County Flips: Democratic Flip / Republican Hold

2016 United States Senate election in South Dakota
Party	Candidate	Votes	%
Republican	John Thune (incumbent)	265,516	71.83%
Democratic	Jay Williams	104,140	28.17%
Total votes		369,656	100.00%
Republican hold			

==== By county ====
County	John Thune Republican		Jay Williams Democratic		Margin		Total
County	#	%	#	%	#	%	Total
Aurora	1,073	75.78%	343	24.22%	730	51.55%	1,416
Beadle	5,049	73.62%	1,809	26.38%	3,240	47.24%	6,858
Bennett	758	66.49%	382	33.51%	376	32.98%	1,140
Bon Homme	2,253	74.53%	770	25.47%	1,483	49.06%	3,023
Brookings	8,817	69.08%	3,947	30.92%	4,870	38.15%	12,764
Brown	11,371	70.35%	4,793	29.65%	6,578	40.70%	16,164
Brule	1,746	75.91%	554	24.09%	1,192	51.83%	2,300
Buffalo	232	47.44%	257	52.56%	-25	-5.11%	489
Butte	3,546	82.39%	758	17.61%	2,788	64.78%	4,304
Campbell	740	89.48%	87	10.52%	653	78.96%	827
Charles Mix	2,484	72.53%	941	27.47%	1,543	45.05%	3,425
Clark	1,269	75.67%	408	24.33%	861	51.34%	1,677
Clay	2,923	57.49%	2,161	42.51%	762	14.99%	5,084
Codington	8,740	74.43%	3,003	25.57%	5,737	48.85%	11,743
Corson	680	58.93%	474	41.07%	206	17.85%	1,154
Custer	3,530	74.99%	1,177	25.01%	2,353	49.99%	4,707
Davison	6,017	75.15%	1,990	24.85%	4,027	50.29%	8,007
Day	1,815	65.36%	962	34.64%	853	30.72%	2,777
Deuel	1,563	74.54%	534	25.46%	1,029	49.07%	2,097
Dewey	862	50.86%	833	49.14%	29	1.71%	1,695
Douglas	1,377	85.79%	228	14.21%	1,149	71.59%	1,605
Edmunds	1,517	79.30%	396	20.70%	1,121	58.60%	1,913
Fall River	2,671	75.47%	868	24.53%	1,803	50.95%	3,539
Faulk	925	81.79%	206	18.21%	719	63.57%	1,131
Grant	2,705	75.24%	890	24.76%	1,815	50.49%	3,595
Gregory	1,671	79.69%	426	20.31%	1,245	59.37%	2,097
Haakon	956	91.92%	84	8.08%	872	83.85%	1,040
Hamlin	2,253	80.78%	536	19.22%	1,717	61.56%	2,789
Hand	1,517	81.91%	335	18.09%	1,182	63.82%	1,852
Hanson	1,512	77.02%	451	22.98%	1,061	54.05%	1,963
Harding	684	90.24%	74	9.76%	610	80.47%	758
Hughes	6,339	77.02%	1,891	22.98%	4,448	54.05%	8,230
Hutchinson	2,779	82.02%	609	17.98%	2,170	64.05%	3,388
Hyde	567	82.05%	124	17.95%	443	64.11%	691
Jackson	771	71.39%	309	28.61%	462	42.78%	1,080
Jerauld	720	73.39%	261	26.61%	459	46.79%	981
Jones	494	88.06%	67	11.94%	427	76.11%	561
Kingsbury	1,899	73.80%	674	26.20%	1,225	47.61%	2,573
Lake	4,677	69.72%	2,031	30.28%	2,646	39.45%	6,708
Lawrence	8,566	72.39%	3,267	27.61%	5,299	44.78%	11,833
Lincoln	19,264	76.12%	6,043	23.88%	13,221	52.24%	25,307
Lyman	1,051	73.55%	378	26.45%	673	47.10%	1,429
Marshall	1,341	68.07%	629	31.93%	712	36.14%	1,970
McCook	2,021	77.14%	599	22.86%	1,422	54.27%	2,620
McPherson	1,009	85.95%	165	14.05%	844	71.89%	1,174
Meade	9,198	79.66%	2,348	20.34%	6,850	59.33%	11,546
Mellette	464	67.44%	224	32.56%	240	34.88%	688
Miner	807	73.97%	284	26.03%	523	47.94%	1,091
Minnehaha	52,494	67.43%	25,359	32.57%	27,135	34.85%	77,853
Moody	1,983	67.15%	970	32.85%	1,013	34.30%	2,953
Oglala Lakota	655	22.81%	2,217	77.19%	-1,562	-54.39%	2,872
Pennington	33,967	72.00%	13,207	28.00%	20,760	44.01%	47,174
Perkins	1,374	85.61%	231	14.39%	1,143	71.21%	1,605
Potter	1,087	81.12%	253	18.88%	834	62.24%	1,340
Roberts	2,550	64.95%	1,376	35.05%	1,174	29.90%	3,926
Sanborn	889	78.46%	244	21.54%	645	56.93%	1,133
Spink	2,177	72.74%	816	27.26%	1,361	45.47%	2,993
Stanley	1,254	80.54%	303	19.46%	951	61.08%	1,557
Sully	718	84.07%	136	15.93%	582	68.15%	854
Todd	724	34.48%	1,376	65.52%	-652	-31.05%	2,100
Tripp	2,134	81.26%	492	18.74%	1,642	62.53%	2,626
Turner	3,289	79.06%	871	20.94%	2,418	58.13%	4,160
Union	6,060	77.17%	1,793	22.83%	4,267	54.34%	7,853
Walworth	1,975	80.38%	482	19.62%	1,493	60.77%	2,457
Yankton	6,542	67.93%	3,089	32.07%	3,453	35.85%	9,631
Ziebach	421	54.96%	345	45.04%	76	9.92%	766
Totals	265,516	71.83%	104,140	28.17%	161,376	43.66%	369,656

==== Counties that flipped from Republican to Democratic ====
- Oglala Lakota (largest city: Pine Ridge)
- Todd (largest city: Mission)
- Buffalo (largest city: Fort Thompson)
