= 2014 United States Senate election in South Dakota =

- November 4, 2014
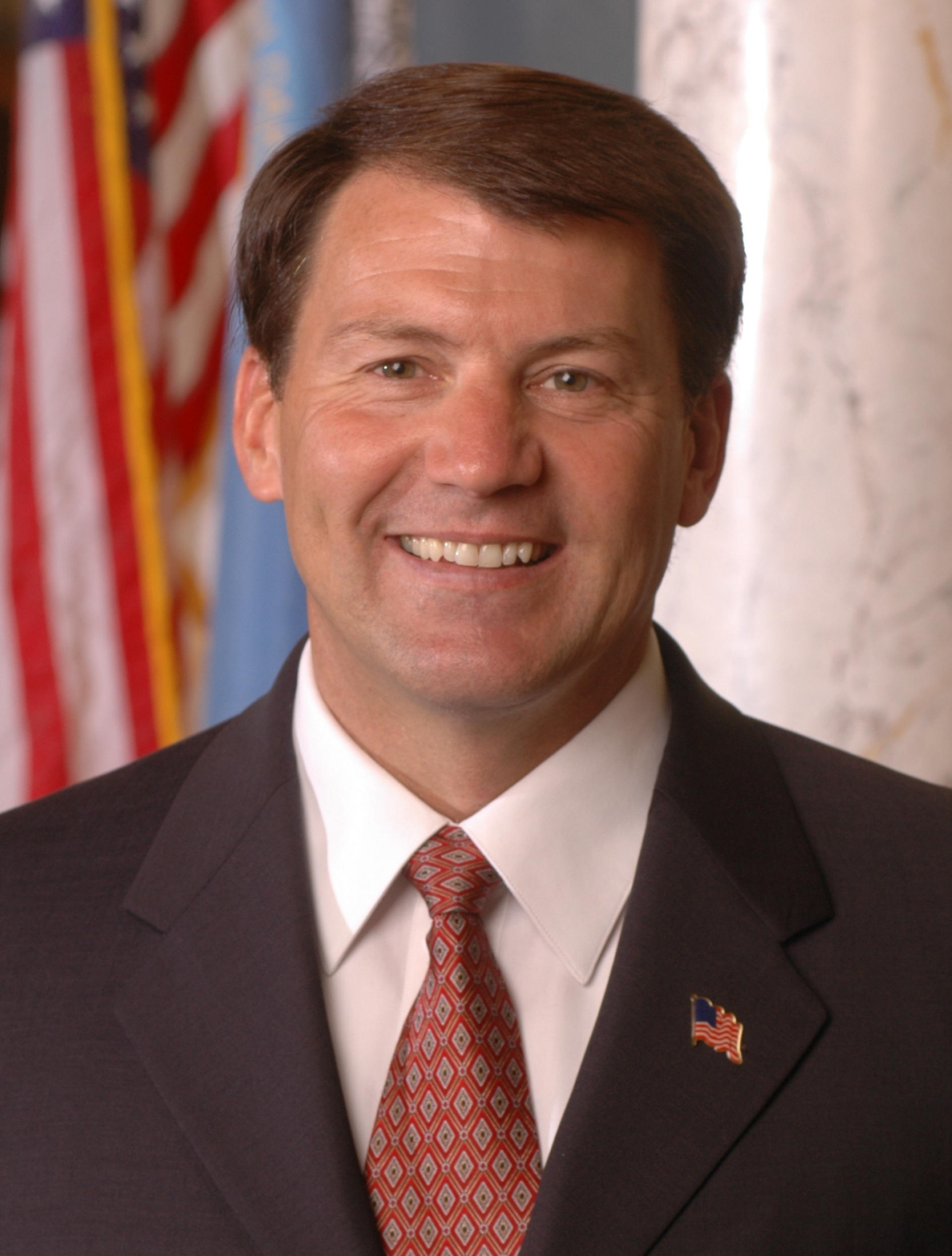

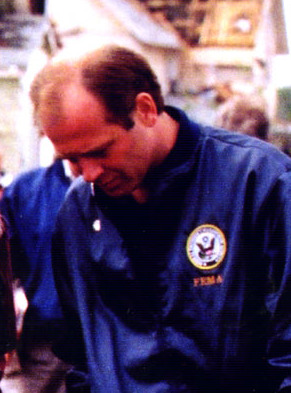

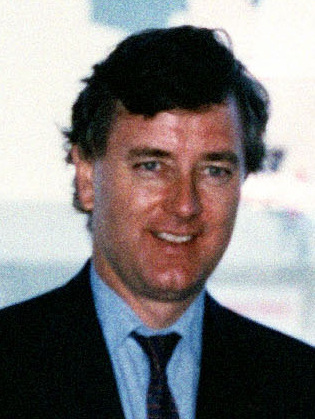
| Nominee | Mike Rounds | Rick Weiland | Larry Pressler |
| Party | Republican | Democratic | Independent |
| Popular vote | 140,741 | 82,456 | 47,741 |
| Percentage | 50.37% | 29.51% | 17.09% |
- Rounds: 30–40% 40–50% 50–60% 60–70% 70–80% 80–90% Weiland: 30–40% 40–50% 50–60% 60–70% 70–80% 80–90% Pressler: 30–40% Tie: 30–40% 40–50%
U.S. senator before election
Tim Johnson
Democratic
Elected U.S. Senator
Mike Rounds
Republican

The 2014 United States Senate election in South Dakota took place on November 4, 2014, to elect a member of the United States Senate to represent the state of South Dakota, concurrently with the election of the governor of South Dakota, other elections to the United States Senate in other states, elections to the United States House of Representatives, and various state and local elections. This was one of the seven Democratic-held Senate seats up for election in a state that Mitt Romney won in the 2012 presidential election.

Incumbent Democratic Senator Tim Johnson decided to retire instead of running for re-election to a fourth term in office. As a result, this was the first open seat election since 1978. Former South Dakota Governor Mike Rounds won the open seat, giving South Dakota an all-GOP congressional delegation for the first time since 1963 and giving Republicans control of both of South Dakota's Senate seats for the first time since 1987.

Businessman Rick Weiland ran unopposed for the Democratic nomination. Also running were two independent candidates: former Republican U.S. Senator Larry Pressler, who held this seat from 1979 to 1997, and former Republican state senator Gordon Howie.

== Democratic primary ==
=== Candidates ===
==== Declared ====
- Rick Weiland, businessman, former staffer for Tom Daschle, nominee for South Dakota's at-large congressional district (SD-AL) in 1996 and candidate for SD-AL in 2002

==== Withdrew ====
- Kevin Artz, businessman
- Henry Jo Sinkie, rancher and resort owner

==== Declined ====
- Jason Frerichs, minority leader of the South Dakota Senate (running for re-election)
- Stephanie Herseth Sandlin, former U.S. representative
- Brendan Johnson, United States attorney for the District of South Dakota and son of incumbent Senator Tim Johnson
- Tim Johnson, incumbent U.S. senator
- Pat O'Brien, author, television anchor and radio host
- Ron J. Volesky, attorney and former state senator

=== Endorsements ===
Rick Weiland

Politicians

- Kent Conrad, former U.S. senator (D-ND)
- Tom Daschle, former U.S. senator (D-SD)
- Byron Dorgan, former U.S. senator (D-ND)
- Tim Johnson, incumbent U.S. senator (D-SD)
- Amy Klobuchar, U.S. senator (D-MN)
- Elizabeth Warren, U.S. senator (D-MA)

Organizations

- Council for a Livable World
- Democracy for America
- Great Plains Tribal Chairman's Association
- United Steelworkers

=== Polling ===
Hypothetical polling

| Poll source | Date(s) administered | Sample size | Margin of error | Brendan Johnson | Stephanie Herseth Sandlin | Undecided |
|---|---|---|---|---|---|---|
| Public Policy Polling | March 18–19, 2013 | 390 | ± 5% | 16% | 68% | 16% |

| Poll source | Date(s) administered | Sample size | Margin of error | Steve Jarding | Brendan Johnson | Rick Weiland | Undecided |
|---|---|---|---|---|---|---|---|
| Nielson Brothers Polling | October 2–6, 2013 | 282 | ± 5.84% | 6.6% | 30.7% | 10.1% | 52.7% |

=== Results ===
Weiland faced no opposition in the Democratic primary.

== Republican primary ==
=== Candidates ===
==== Declared ====
- Annette Bosworth, physician
- Stace Nelson, state representative
- Jason Ravnsborg, attorney
- Larry Rhoden, majority whip of the South Dakota Senate
- Mike Rounds, former governor of South Dakota

==== Declined ====
- Steve T. Kirby, former lieutenant governor of South Dakota and candidate for governor in 2002
- William Napoli, former state senator
- Kristi Noem, U.S. representative
- Mark Venner, former state representative

=== Endorsements ===
Stace Nelson
- Blaine "Chip" Campbell, state representative
- Gordon Howie, radio host, former state senator and candidate for governor in 2010
- Dan Kaiser, state representative
- Elizabeth May, state representative
- Lance Russell, state representative
Larry Rhoden

Individuals

- Erick Erickson, conservative political commentator and editor-in-chief of RedState

Publications

- RedState
Mike Rounds
- Mike Huckabee, former governor of Arkansas and candidate for president in 2008
- John Thune, U.S. senator (R-SD)

=== Polling ===
| Poll source | Date(s) administered | Sample size | Margin of error | Annette Bosworth | Stace Nelson | Larry Rhoden | Mike Rounds | Undecided |
|---|---|---|---|---|---|---|---|---|
| Harper Polling | September 4–5, 2013 | 252 | ±6.17% | 6% | 8% | 7% | 58% | 22% |
| Nielson Brothers Polling | October 2–6, 2013 | 410 | ± 4.84% | 2.7% | 10.4% | 3.9% | 46.1% | 37% |
| Public Opinion Strategies | April 8–10, 2014 | 500 | ± 4.38% | 8% | 14% | 7% | 61% | 9% |

Hypothetical polling

| Poll source | Date(s) administered | Sample size | Margin of error | Kristi Noem | Mike Rounds | Undecided |
|---|---|---|---|---|---|---|
| Public Policy Polling | March 18–19, 2013 | 501 | ± 4.4% | 39% | 43% | 17% |

=== Results ===
Results by county Rounds: 30–40%; 40–50%; 50–60%; 60–70%; 70–80%; Rhoden: 40–50%; 50–60%; Nelson: 40–50%; 70–80%

Republican primary results
| Party | Candidate | Votes | % |
|---|---|---|---|
| Republican | Mike Rounds | 41,377 | 55.54% |
| Republican | Larry Rhoden | 13,593 | 18.25% |
| Republican | Stace Nelson | 13,179 | 17.69% |
| Republican | Annette Bosworth | 4,283 | 5.75% |
| Republican | Jason Ravnsborg | 2,066 | 2.77% |
| Total votes | | 74,490 | 100.00% |

== Independents and third parties ==
=== Candidates ===
==== Declared ====
- Gordon Howie (Independent), former Republican state senator and Republican candidate for governor in 2010
- Larry Pressler (Independent), former Republican U.S. senator

==== Disqualified ====
- Clayton Walker (Independent), small business consultant and Democratic candidate for state representative in 2010

==== Withdrew ====
- Kurt Evans (Libertarian), teacher and nominee for the U.S. Senate in 2002

== General election ==
=== Campaign ===
Rounds was widely seen as the front runner throughout the campaign. However, he faced ongoing criticism on the election trail for his possible involvement with the state's ongoing EB-5 visa investigation, concerning the conflict of interest that Rounds' administration had when administering the EB-5 program. State officials misused funds to pay for their salaries, did not disclose that they owned companies which they gave contracts to, directed money towards companies that went bankrupt and arranged for loans from unknown sources from shell companies located in tax havens. In October 2014, Rounds admitted that he had approved a $1 million state loan to meat-packing company Northern Beef shortly after learning that Secretary of Tourism and State Development Richard Benda had agreed to join the company, with Benda then getting another $600,000 in loans that was ultimately used to pay his own salary. Benda committed suicide in October 2013, days before a possible indictment over embezzlement and grand theft charges.

Columnist Jonathan Ellis of the Argus Leader called Rounds' fundraising "anemic" compared to the amount of outside money coming into the state on Weiland's side, and criticized the entire Rounds campaign as "more suited for sheriff of Mayberry County than U.S. Senate."

=== Debates ===
- Complete video of debate, October 29, 2014

=== Predictions ===
| Source | Ranking | As of |
|---|---|---|
| The Cook Political Report | Lean R (flip) | November 3, 2014 |
| Sabato's Crystal Ball | Likely R (flip) | November 3, 2014 |
| Rothenberg Political Report | Likely R (flip) | November 3, 2014 |
| Real Clear Politics | Likely R (flip) | November 3, 2014 |

=== Polling ===
| Poll source | Date(s) administered | Sample size | Margin of error | Rick Weiland (D) | Mike Rounds (R) | Larry Pressler (I) | Gordon Howie (I) | Other | Undecided |
|---|---|---|---|---|---|---|---|---|---|
| Nielson Brothers Polling | June 10–14, 2013 | 500 | ± 4.4% | 27% | 54% | — | — | — | 19% |
| Harper Polling | September 4–5, 2013 | 517 | ± 4.31% | 38% | 52% | — | — | — | 10% |
| Nielson Brothers Polling | October 2–6, 2013 | 818 | ± 3.43% | 35% | 50% | — | — | — | 15% |
| Public Policy Polling | October 10–13, 2013 | 882 | ± 3.3% | 34% | 40% | — | — | 11% | 15% |
| Rasmussen Reports | February 25–26, 2014 | 500 | ± 4.5% | 31% | 51% | — | — | 6% | 11% |
| Public Policy Polling^ | April 30 – May 1, 2014 | 745 | ± 3.6% | 28% | 38% | 15% | 4% | — | 15% |
| SurveyUSA | May 6–10, 2014 | 504 | ± 4.5% | 30% | 44% | 17% | 3% | 2% | 5% |
| Rasmussen Reports | June 4–5, 2014 | 750 | ± 4% | 29% | 44% | 18% | — | 2% | 7% |
| CBS News/NYT/YouGov | July 5–24, 2014 | 631 | ± 4.5% | 34% | 59% | — | — | 3% | 5% |
| Clarity Campaign Labs^ | July 16–23, 2014 | 3,837 | ± 1.44% | 24% | 34% | 10% | 3% | — | 29% |
| Nielson Brothers Polling | July 23–28, 2014 | 578 | ± 4.04% | 30% | 43% | 14% | 4% | — | 9% |
| Public Opinion Strategies* | August 11–13, 2014 | 500 | ± 4.38% | 24% | 49% | 15% | 4% | — | 7% |
| Public Policy Polling^ | August 12–13, 2014 | 726 | ± 3.6% | 31% | 39% | 16% | 5% | — | 9% |
| Public Policy Polling^ | August 27–28, 2014 | 709 | ± 3.7% | 33% | 39% | 17% | 4% | — | 7% |
| Public Policy Polling^ | August 27–28, 2014 | 709 | ± 3.7% | 42% | 45% | — | — | — | 13% |
| CBS News/NYT/YouGov | August 18 – September 2, 2014 | 526 | ± 6% | 29% | 43% | 6% | — | 1% | 21% |
| SurveyUSA | September 3–7, 2014 | 510 | ± 4.4% | 28% | 39% | 25% | 3% | — | 5% |
| SurveyUSA | September 3–7, 2014 | 510 | ± 4.4% | 42% | 44% | — | 3% | — | 11% |
| ccAdvertising | September 22–23, 2014 | 1,769 | ± ? | 17% | 39% | 17% | — | — | 27% |
| Public Opinion Strategies* | September 22–23, 2014 | 500 | ± 4.38% | 23% | 41% | 19% | 4% | — | 12% |
| Nielson Brothers Polling | September 21–25, 2014 | 647 | ± 3.24% | 26% | 39% | 24% | 4% | — | 7% |
| Nielson Brothers Polling | September 21–25, 2014 | 636 | ± 3.27% | 37.1% | 45% | — | 7% | — | 10% |
| Nielson Brothers Polling | September 21–25, 2014 | 623 | ± 3.3% | — | 40% | 39% | 8% | — | 13% |
| Public Policy Polling^ | September 29–30, 2014 | 703 | ± 3.7% | 28% | 35% | 24% | 8% | — | 5% |
| CBS News/NYT/YouGov | September 20 – October 1, 2014 | 382 | ± 7% | 27% | 42% | 12% | — | 1% | 17% |
| SurveyUSA | October 1–5, 2014 | 616 | ± 4% | 28% | 35% | 32% | 3% | — | 2% |
| SurveyUSA | October 1–5, 2014 | 616 | ± 4% | 47% | 47% | — | 3% | — | 3% |
| SurveyUSA | October 1–5, 2014 | 616 | ± 4% | — | 39% | 54% | 3% | — | 4% |
| Harper Polling | October 9–11, 2014 | 630 | ± 3.9% | 33% | 37% | 23% | 5% | — | 2% |
| Public Opinion Strategies* | October 18–20, 2014 | 500 | ± 4.38% | 24% | 48% | 16% | 3% | — | 9% |
| CBS News/NYT/YouGov | October 16–23, 2014 | 527 | ± 8% | 25% | 38% | 17% | — | 0% | 21% |
| NBC News/Marist | October 19–23, 2014 | 730 LV | ± 3.6% | 29% | 43% | 16% | 3% | <1% | 7% |
| NBC News/Marist | October 19–23, 2014 | 990 RV | ± 3.1% | 28% | 43% | 16% | 4% | <1% | 9% |
| Mason-Dixon | October 20–23, 2014 | 800 | ± 3.5% | 33% | 42% | 13% | 2% | — | 10% |
| SurveyUSA | October 21–26, 2014 | 611 | ± 4% | 32% | 43% | 19% | 2% | — | 4% |
| Rasmussen Reports | October 22–26, 2014 | 908 | ± 3.5% | 31% | 45% | 21% | — | — | 3% |
| Monmouth University | October 24–27, 2014 | 429 | ± 4.7% | 31% | 45% | 19% | 1% | — | 4% |
| Monmouth University | October 24–27, 2014 | 429 | ± 4.7% | 40% | 48% | — | 1% | — | 11% |

Hypothetical polling

With Herseth Sandlin

| Poll source | Date(s) administered | Sample size | Margin of error | Stephanie Herseth Sandlin (D) | Kristi Noem (R) | Other | Undecided |
|---|---|---|---|---|---|---|---|
| Public Policy Polling | March 18–19, 2013 | 1,069 | ± 3% | 48% | 47% | — | 5% |

| Poll source | Date(s) administered | Sample size | Margin of error | Stephanie Herseth Sandlin (D) | Mike Rounds (R) | Other | Undecided |
|---|---|---|---|---|---|---|---|
| Public Policy Polling | March 18–19, 2013 | 1,069 | ± 3% | 44% | 49% | — | 7% |

With B. Johnson

| Poll source | Date(s) administered | Sample size | Margin of error | Brendan Johnson (D) | Kristi Noem (R) | Other | Undecided |
|---|---|---|---|---|---|---|---|
| Public Policy Polling | March 18–19, 2013 | 1,069 | ± 3% | 37% | 49% | — | 14% |

| Poll source | Date(s) administered | Sample size | Margin of error | Brendan Johnson (D) | Mike Rounds (R) | Other | Undecided |
|---|---|---|---|---|---|---|---|
| Public Policy Polling | March 18–19, 2013 | 1,069 | ± 3% | 32% | 53% | — | 15% |

With T. Johnson

| Poll source | Date(s) administered | Sample size | Margin of error | Tim Johnson (D) | Kristi Noem (R) | Other | Undecided |
|---|---|---|---|---|---|---|---|
| Public Policy Polling | March 18–19, 2013 | 1,069 | ± 3% | 45% | 49% | — | 7% |

| Poll source | Date(s) administered | Sample size | Margin of error | Tim Johnson (D) | Mike Rounds (R) | Other | Undecided |
|---|---|---|---|---|---|---|---|
| Public Policy Polling | March 18–19, 2013 | 1,069 | ± 3% | 41% | 52% | — | 7% |

With Weiland

| Poll source | Date(s) administered | Sample size | Margin of error | Rick Weiland (D) | Annette Bosworth (R) | Other | Undecided |
|---|---|---|---|---|---|---|---|
| Harper Polling | September 4–5, 2013 | 517 | ± 4.31% | 38% | 36% | — | 26% |
| Nielson Brothers Polling | October 2–6, 2013 | 815 | ± 3.43% | 38% | 33% | — | 30% |

| Poll source | Date(s) administered | Sample size | Margin of error | Rick Weiland (D) | Stace Nelson (R) | Other | Undecided |
|---|---|---|---|---|---|---|---|
| Harper Polling | September 4–5, 2013 | 517 | ± 4.31% | 38% | 40% | — | 22% |
| Nielson Brothers Polling | October 2–6, 2013 | 815 | ± 3.43% | 36% | 35% | — | 30% |

| Poll source | Date(s) administered | Sample size | Margin of error | Rick Weiland (D) | Larry Rhoden (R) | Other | Undecided |
|---|---|---|---|---|---|---|---|
| Harper Polling | September 4–5, 2013 | 517 | ± 4.31% | 35% | 41% | — | 23% |
| Nielson Brothers Polling | October 2–6, 2013 | 815 | ± 3.43% | 37% | 32% | — | 31% |

- * Internal polling for the Mike Rounds campaign
- ^ Internal polling for the Rick Weiland campaign

=== Results ===
2014 United States Senate election in South Dakota
| Party | Candidate | Votes | % | ±% |
|---|---|---|---|---|
| Republican | Mike Rounds | 140,741 | 50.37% | +12.86% |
| Democratic | Rick Weiland | 82,456 | 29.51% | −32.98% |
| Independent | Larry Pressler | 47,741 | 17.09% | N/A |
| Independent | Gordon Howie | 8,474 | 3.03% | N/A |
| Total votes | | 279,412 | 100.00% | N/A |
| Republican gain from Democratic | | | | |

==== By county ====
| County | Rick Weiland Democratic | | Mike Rounds Republican | | Larry Pressler Independent | | Gordon Howie Independent | | Margin | | Total |
| County | # | % | # | % | # | % | # | % | # | % | Total |
|---|---|---|---|---|---|---|---|---|---|---|---|
| Aurora | 355 | 30.76% | 480 | 41.59% | 259 | 22.44% | 60 | 5.20% | 125 | 10.83% | 1,154 |
| Beadle | 1,622 | 28.69% | 3,018 | 53.39% | 810 | 14.33% | 203 | 3.59% | 1,396 | 24.69% | 5,653 |
| Bennett | 341 | 36.67% | 445 | 47.85% | 110 | 11.83% | 34 | 3.66% | 104 | 11.18% | 930 |
| Bon Homme | 785 | 32.28% | 1,157 | 47.57% | 408 | 16.78% | 82 | 3.37% | 372 | 15.30% | 2,432 |
| Brookings | 3,195 | 34.37% | 4,226 | 45.46% | 1,662 | 17.88% | 213 | 2.29% | 1,031 | 11.09% | 9,296 |
| Brown | 4,023 | 33.35% | 5,382 | 44.62% | 2,417 | 20.04% | 240 | 1.99% | 1,359 | 11.27% | 12,062 |
| Brule | 451 | 25.52% | 889 | 50.31% | 346 | 19.58% | 81 | 4.58% | 438 | 24.79% | 1,767 |
| Buffalo | 292 | 62.80% | 105 | 22.58% | 56 | 12.04% | 12 | 2.58% | -187 | -40.22% | 465 |
| Butte | 539 | 16.78% | 1,910 | 59.45% | 572 | 17.80% | 192 | 5.98% | 1,338 | 41.64% (Note: Compares margin over Pressler.) | 3,213 |
| Campbell | 115 | 18.23% | 414 | 65.61% | 79 | 12.52% | 23 | 3.65% | 299 | 47.39% | 631 |
| Charles Mix | 1,111 | 34.68% | 1,511 | 47.16% | 498 | 15.54% | 84 | 2.62% | 400 | 12.48% | 3,204 |
| Clark | 394 | 25.42% | 737 | 47.55% | 361 | 23.29% | 58 | 3.74% | 343 | 22.13% | 1,550 |
| Clay | 1,689 | 44.51% | 1,433 | 37.76% | 615 | 16.21% | 58 | 1.53% | -256 | -6.75% | 3,795 |
| Codington | 2,572 | 28.06% | 4,605 | 50.23% | 1,771 | 19.32% | 219 | 2.39% | 2,033 | 22.18% | 9,167 |
| Corson | 368 | 39.74% | 399 | 43.09% | 109 | 11.77% | 50 | 5.40% | 31 | 3.35% | 926 |
| Custer | 859 | 23.01% | 2,107 | 56.44% | 616 | 16.50% | 151 | 4.05% | 1,248 | 33.43% | 3,733 |
| Davison | 1,582 | 26.02% | 3,097 | 50.94% | 1,227 | 20.18% | 174 | 2.86% | 1,515 | 24.92% | 6,080 |
| Day | 989 | 40.97% | 868 | 35.96% | 493 | 20.42% | 64 | 2.65% | -121 | -5.01% | 2,414 |
| Deuel | 530 | 29.64% | 847 | 47.37% | 341 | 19.07% | 70 | 3.91% | 317 | 17.73% | 1,788 |
| Dewey | 788 | 53.03% | 457 | 30.75% | 208 | 14.00% | 33 | 2.22% | -331 | -22.27% | 1,486 |
| Douglas | 205 | 15.43% | 877 | 65.99% | 187 | 14.07% | 60 | 4.51% | 672 | 50.56% | 1,329 |
| Edmunds | 422 | 24.28% | 947 | 54.49% | 326 | 18.76% | 43 | 2.47% | 525 | 30.21% | 1,738 |
| Fall River | 674 | 22.94% | 1,587 | 54.02% | 510 | 17.36% | 167 | 5.68% | 913 | 31.08% | 2,938 |
| Faulk | 180 | 20.18% | 508 | 56.95% | 175 | 19.62% | 29 | 3.25% | 328 | 36.77% | 892 |
| Grant | 887 | 30.45% | 1,405 | 48.23% | 534 | 18.33% | 87 | 2.99% | 518 | 17.78% | 2,913 |
| Gregory | 483 | 26.42% | 996 | 54.49% | 284 | 15.54% | 65 | 3.56% | 513 | 28.06% | 1,828 |
| Haakon | 96 | 11.10% | 563 | 65.09% | 153 | 17.69% | 53 | 6.13% | 410 | 47.40% | 865 |
| Hamlin | 551 | 24.55% | 1,191 | 53.07% | 391 | 17.42% | 111 | 4.95% | 640 | 28.52% | 2,244 |
| Hand | 341 | 22.75% | 864 | 57.64% | 240 | 16.01% | 54 | 3.60% | 523 | 34.89% | 1,499 |
| Hanson | 365 | 27.06% | 752 | 55.74% | 165 | 12.23% | 67 | 4.97% | 387 | 28.69% | 1,349 |
| Harding | 46 | 7.69% | 371 | 62.04% | 121 | 20.23% | 60 | 10.03% | 250 | 41.81% | 598 |
| Hughes | 1,573 | 22.63% | 4,197 | 60.39% | 1,058 | 15.22% | 122 | 1.76% | 2,624 | 37.76% | 6,950 |
| Hutchinson | 575 | 20.65% | 1,640 | 58.91% | 494 | 17.74% | 75 | 2.69% | 1,065 | 38.25% | 2,784 |
| Hyde | 128 | 21.16% | 384 | 63.47% | 72 | 11.90% | 21 | 3.47% | 256 | 42.31% | 605 |
| Jackson | 269 | 29.27% | 472 | 51.36% | 133 | 14.47% | 45 | 4.90% | 203 | 22.09% | 919 |
| Jerauld | 292 | 34.52% | 361 | 42.67% | 167 | 19.74% | 26 | 3.07% | 69 | 8.16% | 846 |
| Jones | 66 | 14.25% | 292 | 63.07% | 72 | 15.55% | 33 | 7.13% | 220 | 47.52% | 463 |
| Kingsbury | 669 | 31.38% | 1,026 | 48.12% | 376 | 17.64% | 61 | 2.86% | 357 | 16.74% | 2,132 |
| Lake | 1,862 | 38.01% | 2,283 | 46.60% | 637 | 13.00% | 117 | 2.39% | 421 | 8.59% | 4,899 |
| Lawrence | 2,262 | 25.25% | 4,793 | 53.50% | 1,582 | 17.66% | 322 | 3.59% | 2,531 | 28.25% | 8,959 |
| Lincoln | 4,218 | 24.83% | 9,353 | 55.07% | 3,005 | 17.69% | 409 | 2.41% | 5,135 | 30.23% | 16,985 |
| Lyman | 361 | 29.09% | 630 | 50.77% | 194 | 15.63% | 56 | 4.51% | 269 | 21.68% | 1,241 |
| Marshall | 693 | 39.51% | 684 | 39.00% | 360 | 20.52% | 17 | 0.97% | -9 | -0.51% | 1,754 |
| McCook | 561 | 27.19% | 998 | 48.38% | 418 | 20.26% | 86 | 4.17% | 437 | 21.18% | 2,063 |
| McPherson | 173 | 16.78% | 677 | 65.66% | 154 | 14.94% | 27 | 2.62% | 504 | 48.88% | 1,031 |
| Meade | 1,565 | 18.68% | 4,910 | 58.62% | 1,456 | 17.38% | 445 | 5.31% | 3,345 | 39.94% | 8,376 |
| Mellette | 305 | 44.46% | 252 | 36.73% | 98 | 14.29% | 31 | 4.52% | -53 | -7.73% | 686 |
| Miner | 296 | 33.48% | 405 | 45.81% | 151 | 17.08% | 32 | 3.62% | 109 | 12.33% | 884 |
| Minnehaha | 17,739 | 32.45% | 25,771 | 47.15% | 9,886 | 18.09% | 1,266 | 2.32% | 8,032 | 14.69% | 54,662 |
| Moody | 833 | 34.46% | 1,062 | 43.94% | 447 | 18.49% | 75 | 3.10% | 229 | 9.47% | 2,417 |
| Pennington | 8,244 | 24.45% | 18,812 | 55.79% | 5,439 | 16.13% | 1,223 | 3.63% | 10,568 | 31.34% | 33,718 |
| Perkins | 242 | 18.02% | 792 | 58.97% | 208 | 15.49% | 101 | 7.52% | 550 | 40.95% | 1,343 |
| Potter | 211 | 18.11% | 758 | 65.06% | 174 | 14.94% | 22 | 1.89% | 547 | 46.95% | 1,165 |
| Roberts | 1,377 | 42.49% | 1,326 | 40.91% | 464 | 14.32% | 74 | 2.28% | -51 | -1.57% | 3,241 |
| Sanborn | 211 | 24.20% | 407 | 46.67% | 213 | 24.43% | 41 | 4.70% | 194 | 22.25% | 872 |
| Shannon | 2,277 | 81.47% | 226 | 8.09% | 252 | 9.02% | 40 | 1.43% | -2,025 | -72.45% | 2,795 |
| Spink | 833 | 32.76% | 1,151 | 45.26% | 491 | 19.31% | 68 | 2.67% | 318 | 12.50% | 2,543 |
| Stanley | 289 | 22.32% | 803 | 62.01% | 177 | 13.67% | 26 | 2.01% | 514 | 39.69% | 1,295 |
| Sully | 115 | 16.79% | 446 | 65.11% | 102 | 14.89% | 22 | 3.21% | 331 | 48.32% | 685 |
| Todd | 1,529 | 69.00% | 407 | 18.37% | 238 | 10.74% | 42 | 1.90% | -1,122 | -50.63% | 2,216 |
| Tripp | 506 | 22.99% | 1,328 | 60.34% | 300 | 13.63% | 67 | 3.04% | 822 | 37.35% | 2,201 |
| Turner | 854 | 25.82% | 1,701 | 51.44% | 617 | 18.66% | 135 | 4.08% | 847 | 25.61% | 3,307 |
| Union | 1,268 | 24.69% | 3,150 | 61.34% | 584 | 11.37% | 133 | 2.59% | 1,882 | 36.65% | 5,135 |
| Walworth | 420 | 21.73% | 1,213 | 62.75% | 251 | 12.98% | 49 | 2.53% | 793 | 41.02% | 1,933 |
| Yankton | 2,497 | 32.27% | 3,663 | 47.34% | 1,339 | 17.30% | 239 | 3.09% | 1,166 | 15.07% | 7,738 |
| Ziebach | 293 | 46.36% | 220 | 34.81% | 90 | 14.24% | 29 | 4.59% | -73 | -11.55% | 632 |
| Totals | 82,456 | 29.51% | 140,741 | 50.37% | 47,741 | 17.09% | 8,474 | 3.03% | 58,285 | 20.86% | 279,412 |

==== Counties that flipped from Democratic to Republican ====
- Beadle (largest city: Huron)
- Bon Homme (largest city: Springfield)
- Brown (largest city: Aberdeen)
- Brule (largest city: Chamberlain)
- Charles Mix (largest city: Wagner)
- Corson (largest city: McLaughlin)
- Deuel (largest city: Clear Lake)
- Grant (largest city: Milbank)
- Jerauld (largest city: Wessington Springs)
- Kingsbury (largest city: De Smet)
- Lake (largest city: Madison)
- Miner (largest city: Howard)
- Minnehaha (largest city: Sioux Falls)
- Moody (largest city: Flandreau)
- Sanborn (largest city: Woonsocket)
- Union (largest city: Dakota Dunes)
- Brookings (largest city: Brookings)
- Aurora (largest city: Plankinton)
- Bennett (largest city: Martin)
- Butte (largest city: Belle Fourche)
- Campbell (largest city: Herreid)
- Clark (largest city: Clark)
- Codington (largest city: Watertown)
- Custer (largest city: Custer)
- Davison (largest city: Mitchell)
- Douglas (largest city: Armour)
- Edmunds (largest city: Ipswich)
- Fall River (largest city: Hot Springs)
- Faulk (largest city: Faulkton)
- Gregory (largest city: Gregory)
- Hamlin (largest city: Estelline)
- Hand (largest city: Miller)
- Hanson (largest city: Alexandria)
- Hughes (largest city: Pierre)
- Hutchinson (largest city: Parkston)
- Hyde (largest city: Highmore)
- Jackson (largest city: Kadoka)
- Lawrence (largest city: Spearfish)
- Lincoln (largest city: Sioux Falls)
- Lyman (largest city: Lower Brule)
- McCook (largest city: Salem)
- McPherson (largest city: Eureka)
- Meade (largest city: Sturgis)
- Pennington (largest city: Rapid City)
- Potter (largest city: Gettysburg)
- Spink (largest city: Redfield)
- Stanley (largest city: Fort Pierre)
- Sully (largest city: Onida)
- Tripp (largest city: Winner)
- Turner (largest city: Parker)
- Walworth (largest city: Mobridge)
- Yankton (largest city: Yankton)

=== Maps ===
Support for Howie by county:
>10%
7–8%
6–7%
5–6%
4–5%
3–4%
2–3%
1–2%
<1%

== See also ==
- 2014 South Dakota gubernatorial election
- 2014 United States House of Representatives election in South Dakota
- 2014 United States Senate elections
- 2014 United States elections
