= Rick Weiland =

American politician

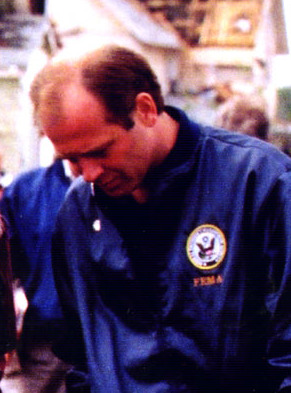

Personal details
- Born: Richard Paul Weiland; July 26, 1958 (age 68) Madison, South Dakota, U.S.
- Party: Democratic
- Spouse: Stacy Newcomb
- Children: 5
- Education: University of South Dakota, Vermillion (BA)
- Website: Official website

Richard Paul Weiland (born July 26, 1958) is an American businessman, politician and member of the Democratic Party from the state of South Dakota. Weiland was the chief executive officer of the International Code Council, was appointed by Bill Clinton to the Federal Emergency Management Agency, and served as senior advisor to former U.S. Senator Tom Daschle.

He was the Democratic nominee for South Dakota's at-large congressional district in 1996 and a candidate for the Democratic nomination for the district in 2002. He was the Democratic nominee the U.S. Senate seat vacated by Democrat Tim Johnson in the 2014 Senate election.

== Personal life ==
Weiland was born in Madison, South Dakota, to Thoreen and Donald Weiland. Weiland's father and mother owned and operated a local ambulance service and funeral home, serving Madison and the surrounding communities. Weiland graduated from Madison High School in 1976, where he first met his wife, Stacy Newcomb. He graduated from the University of South Dakota in 1980 with a degree in communications and political science.

Weiland and his wife have been married since 1981. They have five children and live in Sioux Falls, South Dakota, where they are small-business owners.

== Early career ==
After college, Weiland moved to Sioux Falls, where he started working for then-Congressman Tom Daschle. Weiland married Stacy Newcomb in 1981, and in 1983 they moved to Rapid City, South Dakota where Weiland opened the first west-river field office for Daschle. Weiland and his family then moved to Washington, D.C. in 1985 to serve as Tom Daschle's national finance director and senior advisor.

In 1989, Weiland returned to Sioux Falls to serve as then-Senator Daschle's state director. Weiland stayed in that position until 1995, when he resigned to run for Congress.

== Congressional campaigns ==
1996

In 1996, Weiland ran for South Dakota's at-large congressional district. The seat was being vacated by Democrat Tim Johnson, who was elected to the U.S. Senate. Weiland won the Democratic primary with 42%, defeating James Abbott (28%), Dennis Jones (17%) and Linda Stensland (13%). In the general election, he lost to Republican John Thune by 58% to 37%.

2002

In 2002, with Thune giving up his seat in Congress to unsuccessfully run for the U.S. Senate against incumbent Tim Johnson, Weiland ran again. This time, he lost in the Democratic primary to Stephanie Herseth by 58% to 32%.

Herseth went on to lose in the general election to former Republican governor Bill Janklow, but won a special election for the seat in 2004 after Janklow resigned.

== Regional Director of FEMA ==
After the 1996 election, Weiland was appointed by President Bill Clinton to serve as the Region VIII Director of FEMA, and the family, by then including daughters Taylor and Alexandra, moved to Evergreen, Colorado. As Region VIII Director, Weiland oversaw several states, including South Dakota, Colorado, Utah, North Dakota, Wyoming, and Montana.

In 1997, as Weiland was being installed as regional director of FEMA, the Red River swamped its banks, causing unprecedented flooding to North Dakota and Minnesota, inundating all of downtown Fargo and causing the evacuation of Grand Forks, North Dakota in an event known as the 1997 Red River flood. He supervised the Federal recovery response, which served over 29,000 applicants in Grand Forks, alone.

In 1998, Weiland spearheaded the disaster relief response when Spencer, South Dakota was struck by a major tornado, wiping out the town in the event known as the Late-May 1998 tornado outbreak and derecho. Weiland coordinated with then-Governor Bill Janklow to ensure that the residents of Spencer received food, shelter, and other necessities.

In 1998, Weiland assisted local officials in response to the Columbine tragedy. Weiland and his staff helped to coordinate work among disparate agencies to provide public affairs support to local law enforcement.

In 1999, an F2 tornado devastated the Pine Ridge Indian Reservation. Weiland utilized federal aid freed up by President Clinton to assist the communities impacted by the tornado. In 2000, Weiland again worked with then-Governor Bill Janklow to coordinate the Federal response to the Jasper fire in Black Hills, South Dakota.

Later in 2000, Weiland led a "historic" conference from 28 tribal nations within FEMA Region VIII. At the conference, Weiland and FEMA worked to establish more effective emergency management and coordination to improve services to underprivileged communities on tribal reservations throughout FEMA Region VIII. The conference established a Tribal Emergency Management Coordination Council with representatives from 21 of the 28 tribes present.

== State Director of AARP ==
In 2001, Weiland returned to South Dakota, where he ran again for Congress in 2002, losing in the Democratic primary. Following the campaign, Weiland took over as the state director for the AARP in 2002.

Weiland took responsibility for AARP's 85,000 South Dakota members, developed and implemented numerous successful statewide campaigns to increase membership, participation, value to members, awareness and advocacy, including the establishment of a Senior Bill of Rights protecting Social Security and Medicare.

== Work with International Code Council ==
Weiland left his position with the AARP to join the International Code Council, serving first as its chief operating officer and later as its chief executive officer. As COO, Weiland successfully consolidated several regional legacy organizations into the larger umbrella group.

As CEO, Weiland spearheaded efforts to create the nation's first Green Construction Code and Standards for commercial and residential structures.

This Code was published in 2012 and has already been adopted in several states and communities. Weiland traveled extensively to promote responsible and sustainable Building Codes and practices. Weiland spoke to numerous municipalities and other governmental agencies all over the United States and the world, including China where he was invited by the Chinese government to speak to its officials about implementing safer and sustainable Building Codes.

Weiland stepped down from his position on September 17, 2012, to pursue other opportunities.

== 2014 Senatorial campaign ==
On May 8, 2013, Weiland announced that he would seek the Democratic nomination for South Dakota's open U.S. Senate seat.

The seat was being vacated by Democrat Tim Johnson, who announced he would not be seeking reelection in 2014. Both Johnson and former Senate Majority Leader Tom Daschle endorsed Weiland.

Weiland's campaign emphasized the need to fight the corrupting influence of "big money."

Weiland won the Democratic nomination and faced two independent candidates (former Republican state senator Gordon Howie and former three-term Republican U.S. Senator Larry Pressler), and Republican former governor Mike Rounds in the general election.

Weiland called for opening up Medicare for all Americans, sometimes referred to as a public option; expanding Social Security; fighting the Keystone Pipeline; and adopting a Constitutional amendment overturning Citizens United.

He went on to lose the four-way Senatorial bid to Mike Rounds. While Rounds got 50.37% of the votes cast, Weiland garnered just 29.51%, and Pressler and Howie combined for slightly over 20% of the vote.

Party political offices
| Preceded by Tim Johnson | Democratic nominee for U.S. Senator from South Dakota (Class 2); 2014 | Succeeded by Daniel Ahlers |
