= 2010 United States Senate election in South Dakota =

- November 2, 2010
- Turnout: 323,410 (62.27%)
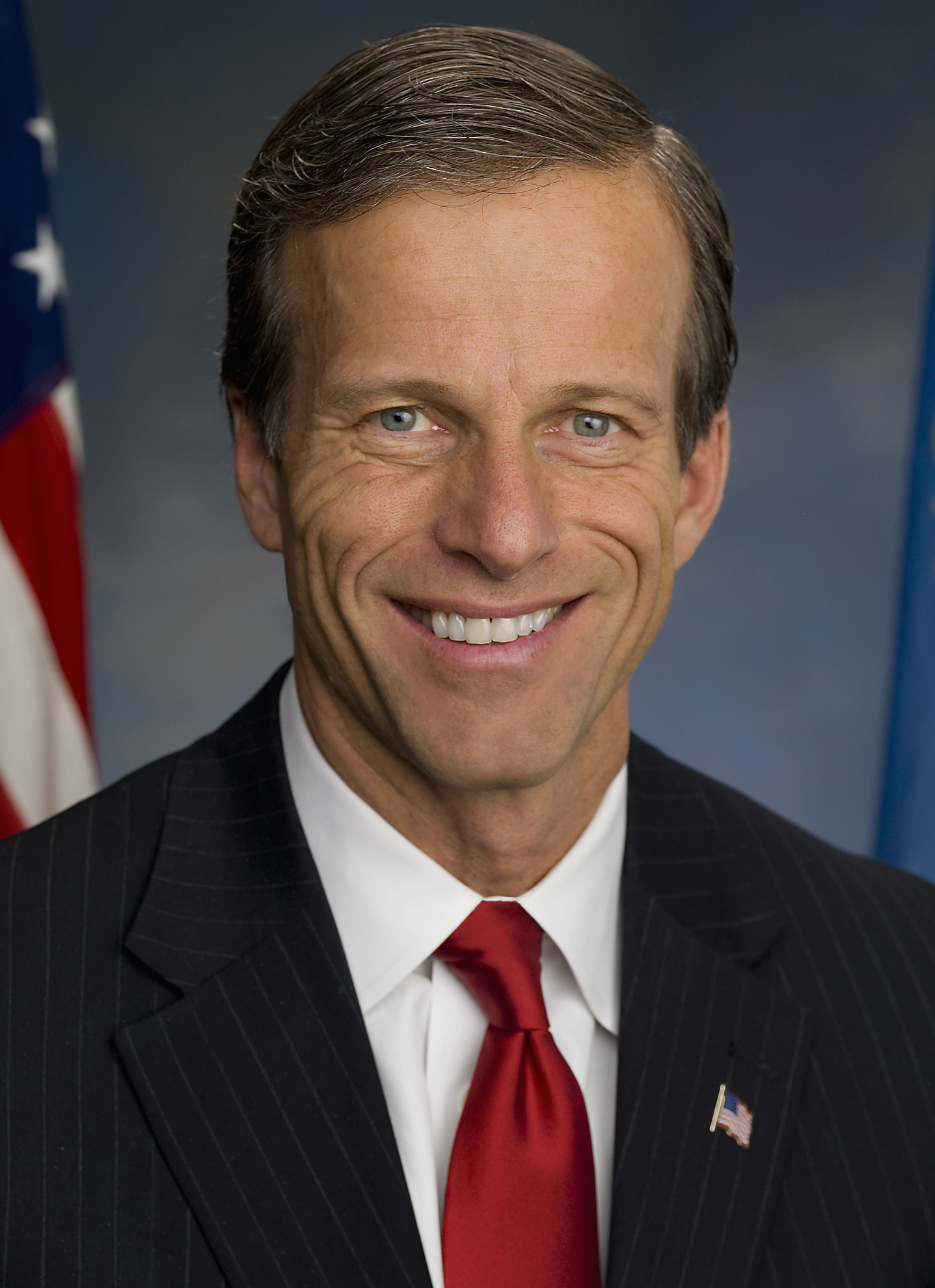
| Nominee | John Thune (uncontested) |
| Party | Republican |
| Popular vote | 227,947 |
| Percentage | 100.00% |
- County results Thune: 100%
U.S. senator before election
John Thune
Republican
Elected U.S. Senator
John Thune
Republican

The 2010 United States Senate election in South Dakota was held on November 2, 2010, to elect a member of the United States Senate to represent the state of South Dakota. Republican incumbent John Thune won re-election to a second term unopposed. Out of a total turnout of 323,410 voters, 227,947 cast votes for Thune, while 95,463 left their ballots blank.

== Background ==
Thune was narrowly elected to his first term over Democratic Senate Minority Leader Tom Daschle with 51% of the vote in 2004. Despite his lack of seniority, Thune became chairman of the U.S. Republican Policy Committee in 2009.

Thune did not face any opposition whatsoever in his 2010 re-election. He won 100% of the votes cast in this senate race, just like John C. Stennis in the 1958 Mississippi senate race. South Dakota State Senate Minority Leader Scott Heidepriem said, "We just concluded that John Thune is an extremely popular senator who is going to win another term in the Senate." There were 89,136 undervotes compared to the concurrent gubernatorial election.

== General election ==
=== Candidates ===
- John Thune, incumbent U.S. senator (2005–present)

=== Predictions ===
| Source | Ranking | As of |
|---|---|---|
| Cook Political Report | Solid R | October 26, 2010 |
| Rothenberg | Safe R | October 22, 2010 |
| RealClearPolitics | Safe R | October 26, 2010 |
| Sabato's Crystal Ball | Safe R | October 21, 2010 |
| CQ Politics | Safe R | October 26, 2010 |

=== Polling ===
Hypothetical polling

| Poll source | Date (s) administered | Sample size (Note: Key: A – all adults RV – registered voters LV – likely voters V – unclear) | Margin of error | John Thune (R) | Generic Democrat | Other | Undecided |
|---|---|---|---|---|---|---|---|
| Public Policy Polling | December 10–13, 2009 | 702 (LV) | ± 3.7% | 56% | 33% | – | 11% |
| Public Policy Polling | January 5, 2010 | 702 (LV) | ± 3.7% | 56% | 43% | – | 5% |
| Public Policy Polling | April 5, 2010 | 702 (LV) | ± 3.7% | 58% | 34% | – | 5% |
| Public Policy Polling | June 5–8, 2010 | 702 (LV) | ± 3.7% | 54% | 44% | – | 5% |

=== Fundraising ===
| Candidate (Party) | Receipts | Disbursements | Cash on hand | Debt |
|---|---|---|---|---|
| John Thune (R) | $6,282,750 | $2,988,648 | $7,194,549 | $0 |
Source: Federal Election Commission

=== Results ===
Votes cast for John Thune in proportion to turnout by county. Counties in gray had more undervotes than votes cast for Thune. 80–90% 70–80% 60–70% 50–60% 40–50% 30–40%

2010 United States Senate election in South Dakota
| Party | Candidate | Votes | % |
|---|---|---|---|
| Republican | John Thune (incumbent) | 227,947 | 100.00% |
| Total votes | | 227,947 | 100.00% |
| Republican hold | | | |

County flips: Republican Hold Flip

==== By county ====
For this table, Thune's vote percent will be his vote total in proportion to the total voter turnout in each county.

| County | John Thune Republican | | Undervotes | | Total ballots cast |
| County | Votes | % | No. | % | Total ballots cast |
|---|---|---|---|---|---|
| Aurora | 926 | 65.81% | 481 | 34.19% | 1,407 |
| Beadle | 4,897 | 70.28% | 2,071 | 29.72% | 6,968 |
| Bennett | 728 | 67.97% | 343 | 32.03% | 1,071 |
| Bon Homme | 1,965 | 68.71% | 895 | 31.29% | 2,860 |
| Brookings | 7,721 | 68.38% | 3,571 | 31.62% | 11,292 |
| Brown | 9,862 | 67.45% | 4,760 | 32.55% | 14,622 |
| Brule | 1,525 | 70.41% | 641 | 29.59% | 2,166 |
| Buffalo | 208 | 45.61% | 248 | 54.39% | 456 |
| Butte | 2,975 | 79.44% | 770 | 20.56% | 3,745 |
| Campbell | 642 | 80.05% | 160 | 19.95% | 802 |
| Charles Mix | 2,518 | 70.85% | 1,036 | 29.15% | 3,554 |
| Clark | 1,190 | 69.75% | 516 | 30.25% | 1,706 |
| Clay | 2,756 | 57.85% | 2,008 | 42.15% | 4,764 |
| Codington | 7,504 | 71.79% | 2,949 | 28.21% | 10,453 |
| Corson | 577 | 64.90% | 312 | 35.10% | 889 |
| Custer | 3,018 | 75.26% | 992 | 24.74% | 4,010 |
| Davison | 5,480 | 74.47% | 1,879 | 25.53% | 7,359 |
| Day | 1,673 | 59.99% | 1,116 | 40.01% | 2,789 |
| Deuel | 1,427 | 69.00% | 641 | 31.00% | 2,068 |
| Dewey | 943 | 58.86% | 659 | 41.14% | 1,602 |
| Douglas | 1,360 | 81.29% | 313 | 18.71% | 1,673 |
| Edmunds | 1,275 | 70.09% | 544 | 29.91% | 1,819 |
| Fall River | 2,336 | 73.83% | 828 | 26.17% | 3,164 |
| Faulk | 798 | 72.48% | 303 | 27.52% | 1,101 |
| Grant | 2,538 | 71.65% | 1,004 | 28.35% | 3,542 |
| Gregory | 1,549 | 74.54% | 529 | 25.46% | 2,078 |
| Haakon | 890 | 85.25% | 154 | 14.75% | 1,044 |
| Hamlin | 1,969 | 73.61% | 706 | 26.39% | 2,675 |
| Hand | 1,393 | 74.65% | 473 | 25.35% | 1,866 |
| Hanson | 1,323 | 74.83% | 445 | 25.17% | 1,768 |
| Harding | 583 | 85.48% | 99 | 14.52% | 682 |
| Hughes | 5,893 | 75.40% | 1,923 | 24.60% | 7,816 |
| Hutchinson | 2,486 | 77.09% | 739 | 22.91% | 3,225 |
| Hyde | 558 | 76.97% | 167 | 23.03% | 725 |
| Jackson | 734 | 75.67% | 236 | 24.33% | 970 |
| Jerauld | 759 | 66.46% | 383 | 33.54% | 1,142 |
| Jones | 507 | 84.78% | 91 | 15.22% | 598 |
| Kingsbury | 1,707 | 68.36% | 790 | 31.64% | 2,497 |
| Lake | 3,700 | 69.34% | 1,636 | 30.66% | 5,336 |
| Lawrence | 7,491 | 72.38% | 2,858 | 27.62% | 10,349 |
| Lincoln | 13,642 | 75.00% | 4,548 | 25.00% | 18,190 |
| Lyman | 1,012 | 71.72% | 399 | 28.28% | 1,411 |
| Marshall | 1,186 | 63.19% | 691 | 36.81% | 1,877 |
| McCook | 1,759 | 69.14% | 785 | 30.86% | 2,544 |
| McPherson | 990 | 81.01% | 232 | 18.99% | 1,222 |
| Meade | 7,360 | 77.53% | 2,133 | 22.47% | 9,493 |
| Mellette | 543 | 70.89% | 223 | 29.11% | 766 |
| Miner | 725 | 63.76% | 412 | 36.24% | 1,137 |
| Minnehaha | 44,085 | 66.82% | 21,888 | 33.18% | 65,973 |
| Moody | 1,822 | 65.68% | 952 | 34.32% | 2,774 |
| Pennington | 27,928 | 74.52% | 9,547 | 25.48% | 37,475 |
| Perkins | 1,088 | 77.55% | 315 | 22.45% | 1,403 |
| Potter | 1,035 | 77.41% | 302 | 22.59% | 1,337 |
| Roberts | 2,498 | 64.27% | 1,389 | 35.73% | 3,887 |
| Sanborn | 854 | 72.31% | 327 | 27.69% | 1,181 |
| Shannon | 854 | 32.50% | 1,774 | 67.50% | 2,628 |
| Spink | 2,055 | 69.40% | 906 | 30.60% | 2,961 |
| Stanley | 1,062 | 73.60% | 381 | 26.40% | 1,443 |
| Sully | 600 | 79.79% | 152 | 20.21% | 752 |
| Todd | 1,009 | 50.05% | 1,007 | 49.95% | 2,016 |
| Tripp | 1,925 | 75.91% | 611 | 24.09% | 2,536 |
| Turner | 2,778 | 72.19% | 1,070 | 27.81% | 3,848 |
| Union | 4,522 | 73.66% | 1,617 | 26.34% | 6,139 |
| Walworth | 1,745 | 76.77% | 528 | 23.23% | 2,273 |
| Yankton | 6,063 | 69.00% | 2,724 | 31.00% | 8,787 |
| Ziebach | 423 | 60.09% | 281 | 39.91% | 704 |
| Statewide | 227,947 | 70.48% | 95,463 | 29.52% | 323,410 |

Counties that flipped from Democratic to Republican

- Beadle (largest city: Huron)
- Bon Homme (largest city: Springfield)
- Brown (largest city: Aberdeen)
- Brule (largest city: Chamberlain)
- Charles Mix (largest city: Wagner)
- Corson (largest city: McLaughlin)
- Deuel (largest city: Clear Lake)
- Grant (largest city: Milbank)
- Jerauld (largest city: Wessington Springs)
- Kingsbury (largest city: De Smet)
- Lake (largest city: Madison)
- Miner (largest city: Howard)
- Minnehaha (largest city: Sioux Falls)
- Moody (largest city: Flandreau)
- Sanborn (largest city: Woonsocket)
- Brookings (largest city: Brookings)
- Aurora (largest city: Plankinton)
- Bennett (largest city: Martin)
- Clark (largest city: Clark)
- Edmunds (largest city: Ipswich)
- Faulk (largest city: Faulkton)
- Hand (largest city: Miller)
- Jackson (largest city: Kadoka)
- Lyman (largest city: Lower Brule)
- Spink (largest city: Redfield)
- Yankton (largest city: Yankton)
- Day (largest city: Webster)
- Roberts (largest city: Sisseton)
- Ziebach (largest city: Dupree)
- Marshall (largest city: Britton)
- Shannon (largest city: Pine Ridge)
- Todd (largest city: Mission)
- Buffalo (largest city: Fort Thompson)
- Mellette (largest city: White River)
- Clay (largest city: Vermillion)
- Dewey (largest city: North Eagle Butte)
