= 2002 United States House of Representatives election in South Dakota =

- November 5, 2002

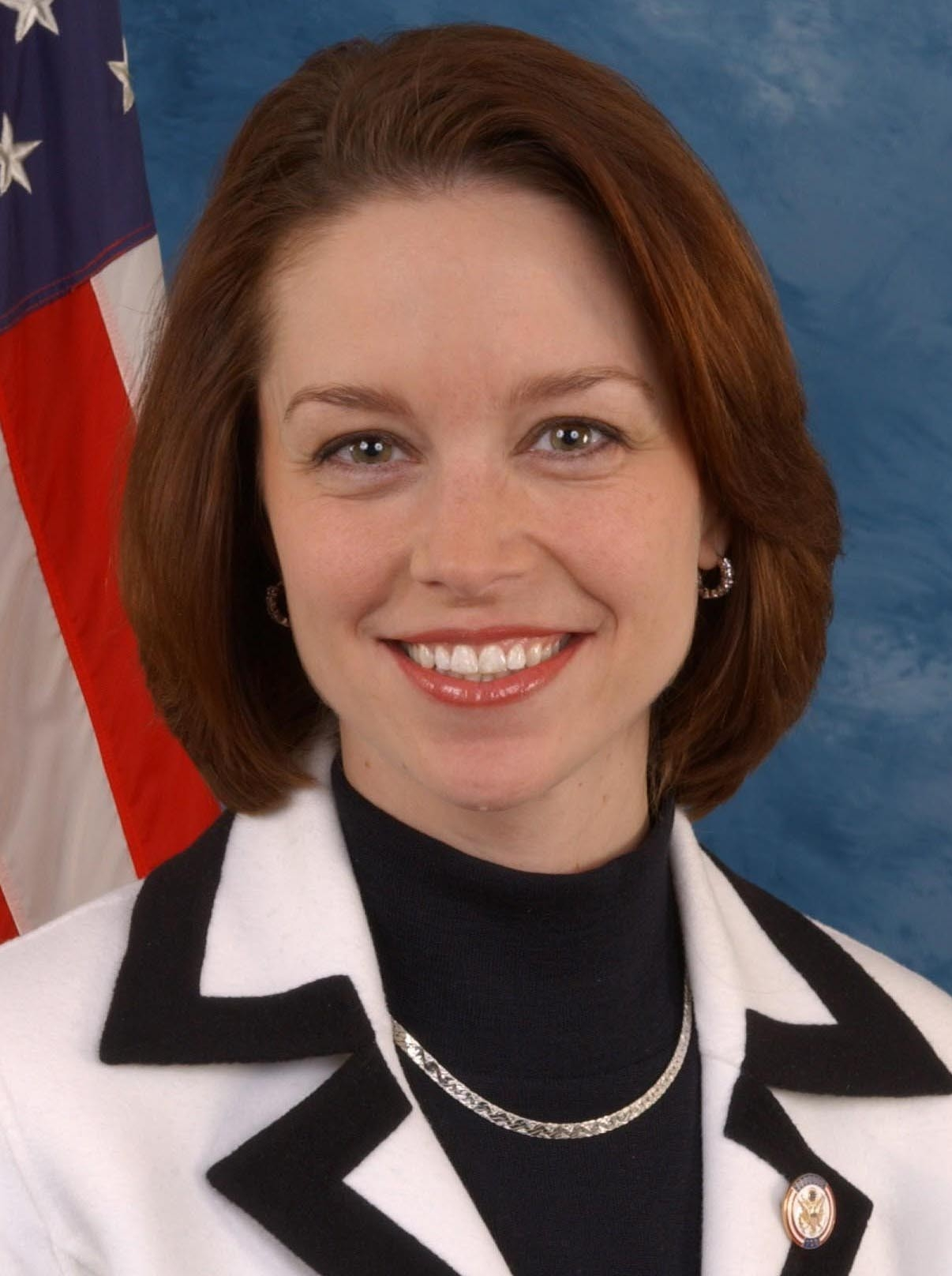
Nominee	Bill Janklow	Stephanie Herseth
Party	Republican	Democratic
Popular vote	180,023	153,551
Percentage	53.47%	45.61%
- County results Janklow: 40–50% 50–60% 60–70% 70–80% Herseth: 50–60% 60–70% 70–80% >90% Tie: 40–50%
U.S. Representative before election
John Thune
Republican
Elected U.S. Representative
Bill Janklow
Republican

The 2002 United States House of Representatives election in South Dakota took place on Tuesday, November 5, 2002. Voters selected a representative for their single at-large district, who ran on a statewide ballot.

== Republican primary ==
=== Candidates ===
- Timothy Amdahl, South Dakota Superintendent of Public Instruction; former S.D. School and Public Lands Commissioner
- Roger Hunt, South Dakota state representative
- Bill Janklow, incumbent governor of South Dakota
- Larry Pressler, former U.S. senator
- Bert Tollefson

=== Campaign ===
With Thune opting to run for the Senate, a competitive race for the Republican nomination occurred. Among the five candidates pursuing the nomination, the most notable included former Senator Larry Pressler and Governor Bill Janklow, the latter of whom was personally recruited to run by President George W. Bush and his advisers.

=== Results ===
Republican primary results
Party	Candidate	Votes	%
Republican	Bill Janklow	60,575	54.93%
Republican	Larry Pressler	29,992	27.20%
Republican	Tim Amdahl	10,593	9.61%
Republican	Roger Hunt	7,799	7.07%
Republican	Bert Tollefson	1,311	1.19%
Total votes		110,270	100.00%

== Democratic primary ==
=== Candidates ===
- Dick Casey
- Stephanie Herseth, attorney
- Denny Pierson
- Rick Weiland, former aide to Senator Tom Daschle and nominee for this seat in 1996

=== Campaign ===
Democrats made a stronger effort to win the seat than in the previous election cycles, with the popular Thune choosing to challenge incumbent Senator Tim Johnson rather than seek re-election. Democrats touted Stephanie Herseth, a law clerk and member of the prominent Herseth family (which includes several individuals who have been active in South Dakota politics, such as her grandfather Ralph Herseth, a former governor of South Dakota).

=== Results ===
Democratic primary results
Party	Candidate	Votes	%
Democratic	Stephanie Herseth	39,576	58.15
Democratic	Rick Weiland	22,083	32.45
Democratic	Dick Casey	4,732	6.95
Democratic	Denny Pierson	1,671	2.46
Total votes		68,062	100.00

== General election ==
=== Predictions ===
Source	Ranking	As of
Sabato's Crystal Ball	Lean R	November 4, 2002
New York Times	Tossup	October 14, 2002

=== Campaign ===
Despite Janklow's high popularity as governor, the race was unexpectedly close. Herseth proved to be a skillful fundraiser and, as a result, was able to stay close to her opponent in campaign funds. The polls confirmed the closeness of the race, showing both of them consistently within single digits of each other throughout the election.

Throughout the campaign, Janklow emphasized his experience and commitment to seeing that the United States was protected from terrorism, while Herseth emphasized the economic issues of South Dakota. A controversy occurred in regard to an attack ad created by the National Republican Congressional Committee which questioned Herseth's roots in South Dakota. It pointed to the fact that she had not registered to vote in her home state until the year before, and, prior to that, had voted in Maryland in 2000. Herseth accused the ad of being "both inaccurate and offensive." Though Russ Levsen, her spokesman, acknowledged that she had voted in Maryland and reregistered to vote in South Dakota in 2001, he countered that she had previously been registered in her home state at the age of eighteen and had voted in five elections between 1989 and 1998. The NRCC pulled the ad within forty-eight hours in response to the bipartisan criticisms of both candidates. The ad was subsequently replaced with one that promoted Janklow's credentials.

Though Republicans were unsuccessful in defeating Tim Johnson during the concurrent Senate election, they did succeed in defending South Dakota's U.S. House seat.

=== Results ===
South Dakota's at-large congressional district election, 2002
Party	Candidate	Votes	%
Republican	Bill Janklow	180,023	53.47%
Democratic	Stephanie Herseth	153,551	45.61%
Libertarian	Terry Begay	3,117	0.93%
Total votes		336,691	100.00%
Republican hold			

==== Counties that flipped from Republican to Democratic ====
- Deuel (largest city: Clear Lake)
- Brookings (largest city: Brookings)
- Spink (largest city: Redfield) (became tied)
- Aurora (largest city: Plankinton)
- Brown (largest city: Aberdeen)
- Day (largest city: Webster)
- Roberts (largest city: Sisseton)
- Beadle (largest city: Huron)
- Bon Homme (largest city: Springfield)
- Clay (largest city: Vermillion)
- Jerauld (largest city: Wessington Springs)
- Buffalo (largest city: Fort Thompson)
- Mellette (largest city: White River)
- Bennett (largest city: Martin)
- Lyman (largest city: Lower Brule)
- Corson (largest city: McLaughlin)
- Dewey (largest city: North Eagle Butte)
- Sanborn (largest city: Woonsocket) (became tied)
- Ziebach (largest city: Dupree)

=== Aftermath ===
Herseth won the seat in a special election less than eighteen months later, after Janklow resigned in January 2004 following a conviction of vehicular manslaughter.
