= John Thune =

American politician (born 1961)

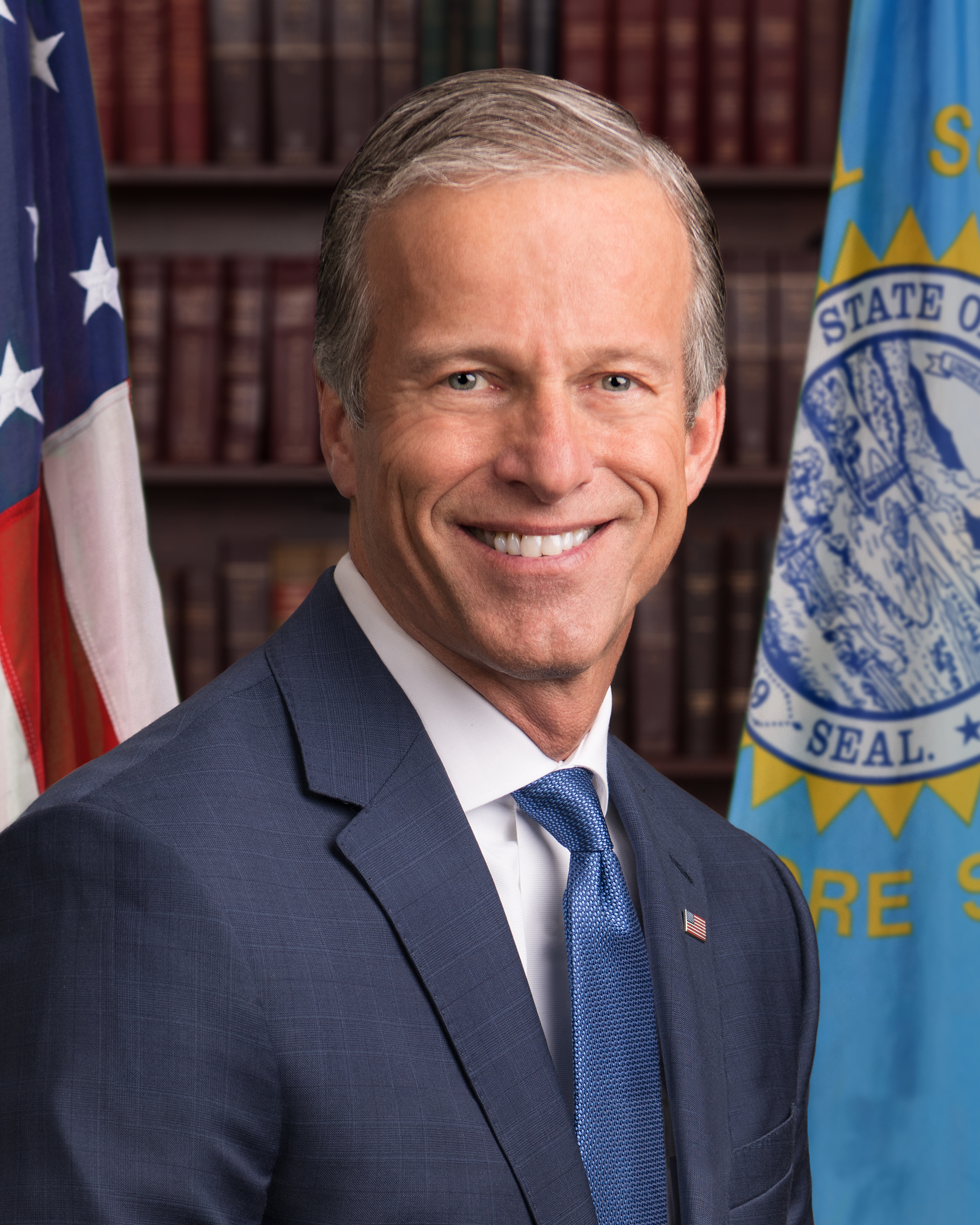
- Official portrait, 2021

Senate Minority Leader-designate
- Assuming office January 3, 2027
- Whip: John Barrasso (designate)
- Succeeding: Chuck Schumer

Senate Majority Leader
- Incumbent
- Assumed office January 3, 2025
- Whip: John Barrasso
- Preceded by: Chuck Schumer

United States Senator from South Dakota
- Incumbent
- Assumed office January 3, 2005 Serving with Mike Rounds
- Preceded by: Tom Daschle
Senate positions
Leader of the Senate Republican Conference
Incumbent
Assumed office January 3, 2025
Preceded by	Mitch McConnell
Senate Minority Whip
In office January 20, 2021 – January 3, 2025
Leader	Mitch McConnell
Preceded by	Dick Durbin
Succeeded by	Dick Durbin
Senate Majority Whip
In office January 3, 2019 – January 20, 2021
Leader	Mitch McConnell
Preceded by	John Cornyn
Succeeded by	Dick Durbin
Chair of the Senate Commerce Committee
In office January 3, 2015 – January 3, 2019
Preceded by	Jay Rockefeller
Succeeded by	Roger Wicker
Chair of the Senate Republican Conference
In office January 26, 2012 – January 3, 2019
Leader	Mitch McConnell
Vice Chair	Roy Blunt
Preceded by	Lamar Alexander
Succeeded by	John Barrasso
Chair of the Senate Republican Policy Committee
In office June 17, 2009 – January 26, 2012
Leader	Mitch McConnell
Preceded by	John Ensign
Succeeded by	John Barrasso

Member of the U.S. House of Representatives from South Dakota's at-large district
- In office January 3, 1997 – January 3, 2003
- Preceded by: Tim Johnson
- Succeeded by: Bill Janklow

Personal details
- Born: John Randolph Thune; January 7, 1961 (age 65) Pierre, South Dakota, U.S.
- Party: Republican
- Spouse: Kimberley Weems (m. 1984)
- Children: 2
- Relatives: Luke J. Lindberg (son-in-law)
- Education: Biola University (BA); University of South Dakota (MBA)
- Website: Senate website Campaign website
- Thune's voice Thune on the assassination of conservative activist Charlie Kirk; Recorded September 10, 2025

John Randolph Thune (/θuːn/ THOON; born January 7, 1961) is an American politician serving as the senior United States senator from South Dakota, a seat he has held since 2005. A member of the Republican Party, Thune has served since 2025 as Senate majority leader and Senate Republican leader. From 1997 to 2003, Thune served as the U.S. representative for South Dakota's at-large congressional district.

Born in Pierre, South Dakota, Thune is a graduate of Biola University and the University of South Dakota. First elected to Congress in 1996, he was reelected in 1998 and 2000 before running for U.S. Senate in 2002, narrowly losing to incumbent senator Tim Johnson. In 2004, Thune ran for Senate again and defeated Senate Democratic leader Tom Daschle. He was reelected in 2010, 2016, and 2022.

During his Senate tenure, Thune has served as the Republican chief deputy whip (2007–2009); chair of the Senate Republican Policy Committee (2009–2012); Senate Republican Conference chair (2012–2019); majority whip (2019–2021); and minority whip (2021–2025).

== Early life and education ==
Thune was born in Pierre, South Dakota, on January 7, 1961. He is the son of Yvonne Patricia (née Bodine) and Harold Richard Thune. Harold Thune was a fighter pilot in the Pacific theater during World War II who flew the Grumman F6F Hellcat; he was awarded the Distinguished Flying Cross after shooting down four enemy planes. Thune's paternal grandfather, Nicholas Thune, immigrated to the United States from Norway in 1906; he partnered with his brother to run a chain of hardware stores in South Dakota. Nicholas Thune changed his last name to Thune from Gjelsvik because he was told by immigration officers that the name Gjelsvik was too hard to pronounce. Thune's maternal grandfather was from Ontario, Canada, and his mother was born in Saskatchewan.

Thune was a star athlete in high school, active in basketball, track, and football. He graduated from Jones County High School in 1979. Thune played college basketball at Biola University in California; he graduated from Biola in 1983 with a Bachelor of Arts degree in business. He received a Master of Business Administration degree from the University of South Dakota in 1984.

== Early political career ==
After completing his MBA, Thune became involved in politics. He worked as a legislative aide for U.S. senator James Abdnor from 1985 to 1987. In 1989, Thune moved to Pierre, where he served as executive director of the state Republican Party for two years. Thune was appointed Railroad Director of South Dakota by Governor George S. Mickelson and served from 1991 to 1993. From 1993 to 1996, he was executive director of the South Dakota Municipal League.

== U.S. House of Representatives (1997–2003) ==
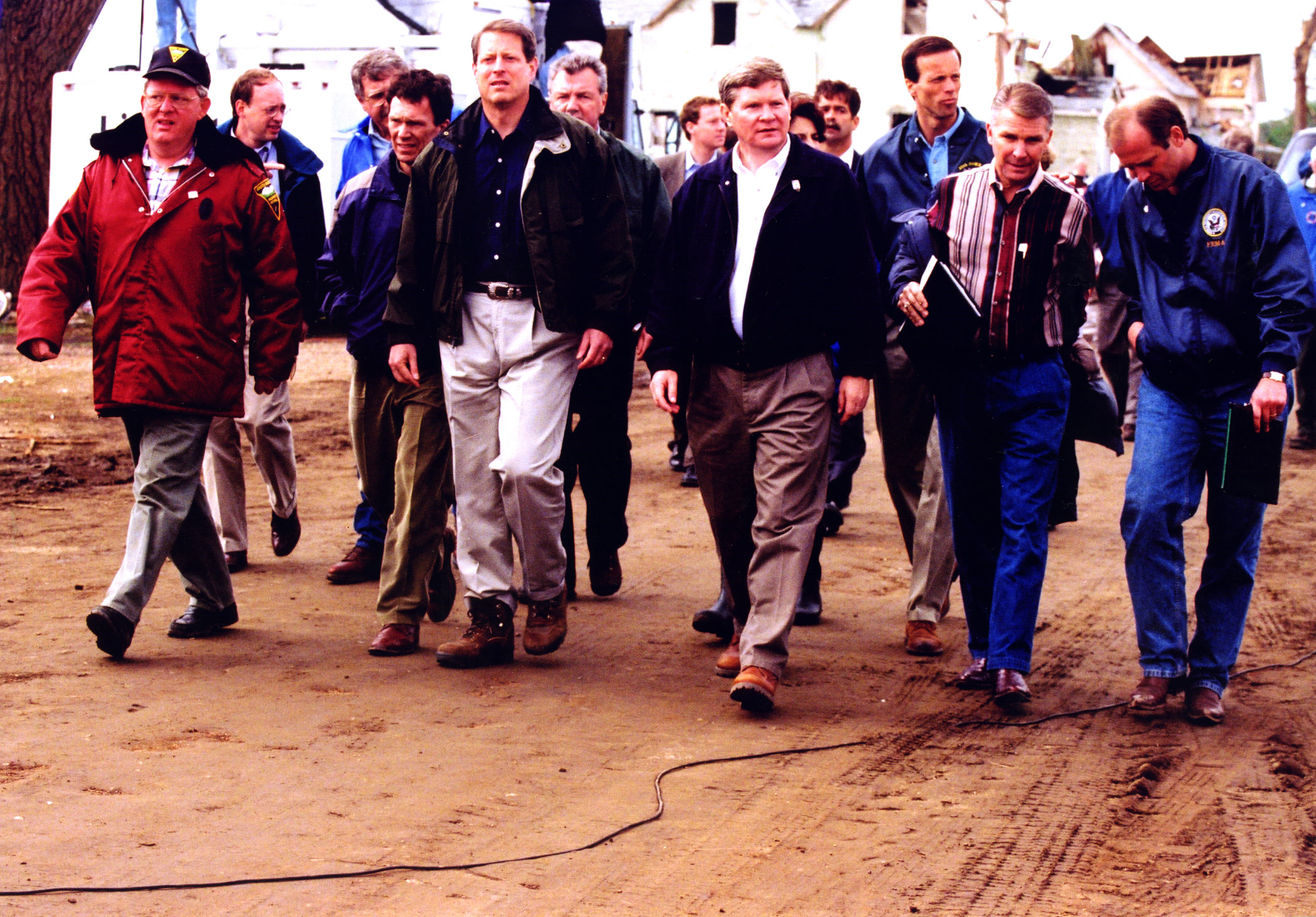
Thune surveys tornado damage in Spencer, South Dakota, in 1998, alongside Bill Janklow, Tom Daschle, Al Gore, Tim Johnson, James Lee Witt, and Rick Weiland.

=== Elections ===
Thune began his political career in 1996 by entering the race for South Dakota's lone seat in the U.S. House of Representatives. The Almanac of American Politics said that Thune "entered the 1996 race as very much an underdog." His opponent in the Republican primary was sitting Lieutenant Governor Carole Hillard of Rapid City, who benefited from the support of longtime South Dakota Governor Bill Janklow. A May 1996 poll showed Hillard leading Thune by a margin of 69%–15%. By relying on strong interpersonal skills and the help of his old network of Abdnor friends, Thune won the primary, defeating Hillard 59%–41%. In the general election, Thune defeated Democrat Rick Weiland, a long-serving aide to U.S. Senator Tom Daschle, 58%–37%.

Thune won his subsequent U.S. House races by wide margins. He was reelected in 1998 with 75% of the vote and in 2000 with 73% of the vote.

== U.S. Senate (2005–present) ==
=== Elections ===
==== 2002 ====
In 2002, after briefly considering a run for governor, Thune set his sights on the U.S. Senate. He ran against incumbent Democratic U.S. senator Tim Johnson and lost by only 524 votes (0.15%). One study concluded: "While the margin of victory [for Johnson] was a mere 524 votes, getting into that winning position required a number of important factors, including Native American turnout, the ability of Johnson and his allies to more effectively use the ground war to get their message out, Thune's ineffectiveness on the air and lack of experience in winning competitive elections, low voter turnout in key Republican counties, the drought, and finally the presence of Kurt Evans. Evans, a Libertarian candidate who withdrew from the race, endorsed Thune, but remained on the ballot and siphoned away more votes from Thune than Johnson. Evans received only 3,070 votes, but that ended up being six times greater than the margin of victory." Despite the close results, Thune did not contest the election.

==== 2004 ====
In 2004, Thune challenged Tom Daschle, the United States Senate minority leader and leader of the Senate Democratic Caucus. In early 2003, despite speculation, Daschle decided not to run for president the following year. CNN reported that the "announcement surprised even some of his closest aides, one of whom told CNN plans were being made for Daschle to announce his candidacy Saturday in his hometown of Aberdeen, South Dakota."

The 2004 U.S. Senate race in South Dakota was the most expensive Senate race that year, with a total of $30 million spent, and the most expensive race in South Dakota history. It was widely followed in the national media. Thune, along with Senate majority leader Bill Frist, President George W. Bush, and Vice President Dick Cheney, described Daschle as the "chief obstructionist" of Bush's agenda. "Thune was able to criticize 'Daschle for serving incompatible masters' and portray him, as Frist did when he came to South Dakota to campaign for Thune, as a partisan obstructionist and political heir to liberal icon and former Senator George McGovern of South Dakota."

Daschle's critics charged the Democrat with using filibusters to block confirmation of several of Bush's nominees to the federal judiciary and of being out of step with South Dakota voters on other political and social issues: "The GOP had targeted Daschle, the Senate minority leader, claiming he had been the chief obstruction to President Bush on such issues as tax cuts, judicial nominees and the war in Iraq."

On November 2, 2004, Thune defeated Daschle by 4,508 votes, winning 51% of the vote. Daschle's loss was the first ousting of an incumbent floor leader since 1952, when Arizona Senator Ernest McFarland lost to Barry Goldwater. The loss made Daschle "the first Senate party leader in more than five decades to be voted out of office".

South Dakota native Tom Brokaw commented that Thune "ran a very strong campaign" to win the 2004 race. University of South Dakota political scientist Bill Richardson said, "motivated John Thune supporters went to the polls in large numbers, part of a massive South Dakota turnout. Unofficial results show nearly 80 percent of registered voters cast ballots." After Thune defeated Daschle, many Republicans regarded him as a "rising star with unlimited political potential".

==== 2010 ====
Thune was reelected without any opposition in either the primary or general election. Scott Heidepriem, the South Dakota Senate minority leader and a Democratic candidate for Governor of South Dakota, said, "We just concluded that John Thune is an extremely popular senator who is going to win another term in the Senate." The conservative publication Townhall commented that the absence of a Democratic candidate in the election marked "the first time in the state's modern history in which a major party has failed to field a Senate candidate".

==== 2016 ====
Thune faced Democratic nominee Jay Williams, chair of the Yankton County Democratic Party. On November 8, he defeated Williams with 71.8% of the vote.

==== 2022 ====
Thune "drew the wrath of Donald Trump for pushing back on the former president's false claims" that he won the 2020 presidential election. Trump called upon South Dakota governor Kristi Noem to launch a primary challenge to Thune in the 2022 U.S. Senate election in South Dakota; Noem declined. Thune also received negative feedback from Trump supporters for his position on the 2020 election. While Thune seriously considered retiring from the Senate, he announced in January 2022 that he would seek reelection to a fourth term. He was reelected with 69.6% of the vote, defeating Democratic nominee Brian Bengs.

=== Tenure ===
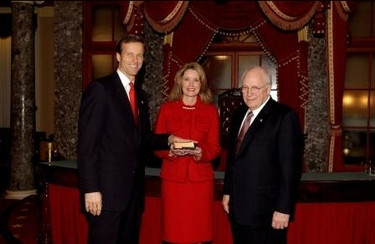
Thune and his wife Kimberley with Vice President Dick Cheney in 2005

On December 6, 2006, Thune was chosen by Senate Republican whip Trent Lott to be the GOP's chief deputy whip. After briefly serving as Republican Conference vice-chairman, Thune became chairman of the Republican Policy Committee in June 2009. The post was the fourth-ranking position in the Senate.

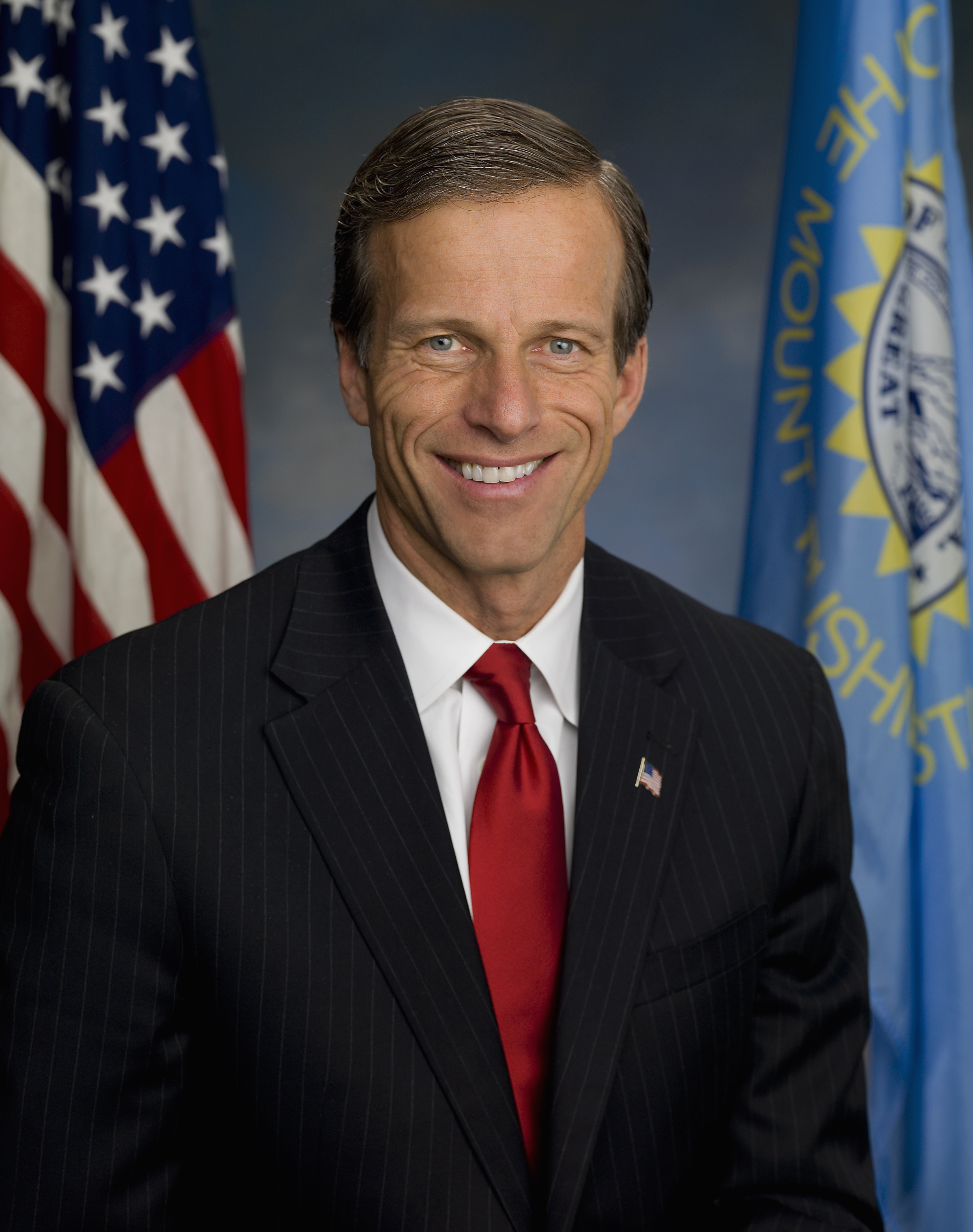
Thune in 2010 during the 111th Congress

In March 2009, Thune was one of 14 senators to vote against a procedural move that essentially guaranteed a major expansion of a national service corps. The Congressional Budget Office estimated that the bill would cost at least $418 million in the fiscal year 2010 and $5.7 billion from 2010 to 2014. He was elected Republican Conference chairman in 2011, taking office in January 2012. The conference chairman is the third-ranking position in the Senate. In late 2011, the Mitchell Daily Republic wrote: "Thune's elevation to the No. 3 spot makes him the highest-ranking Republican senator in South Dakota history. Thune has served as chairman of the Republican Policy Committee from 2009 until the present time and was vice chairman of the Republican Conference from 2008 to 2009 and the Republican chief deputy whip from 2006 to 2008."

Thune's emergence as a conservative voice in the Senate gained him a profile in the conservative magazine The Weekly Standard that called him an exceptional politician who, unlike many of his colleagues, could communicate traditional conservatism, making him a popular alternative to the Tea Party.

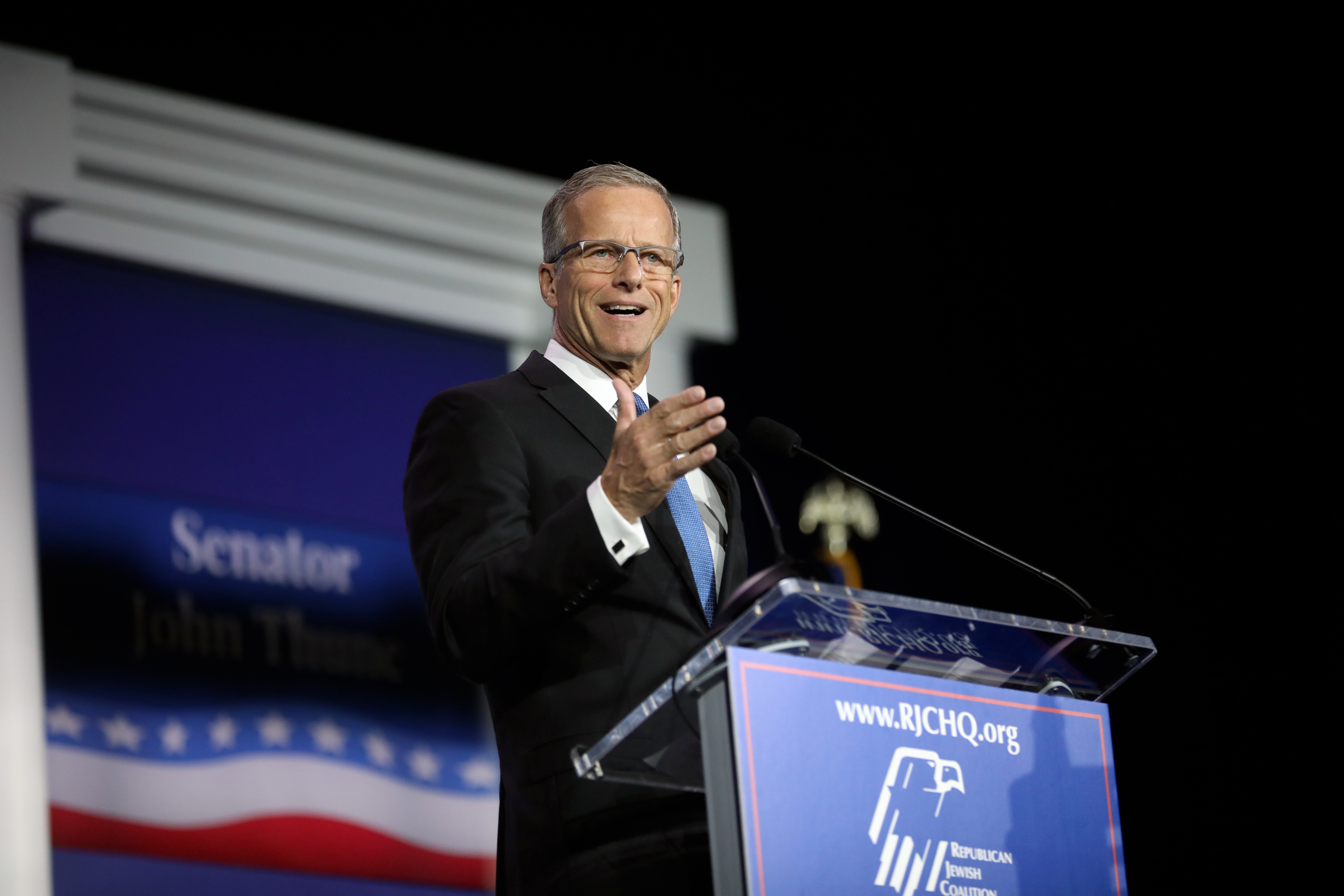
Thune speaking at the Republican Jewish Coalition 2023 Annual Leadership Summit in Las Vegas, Nevada

In June 2018, Thune called on Special Counsel Robert Mueller to "start winding" down his investigation into Russian interference in the 2016 presidential election. Thune is South Dakota's senior U.S. senator. The Senate Republican Conference selected him as majority whip for the 116th Congress, succeeding John Cornyn, who was term-limited in the position. He served as minority whip in the 117th Congress and continued to serve as minority whip in the 118th Congress. After becoming Senate majority leader in January 2025, Thune worked with President Donald Trump to move his agenda forward while maintaining the Senate's independence. They disagreed over the SAVE America Act, which Thune said did not have enough votes to pass. Thune also defended the legislative filibuster, saying it was important to preserving the Senate's role in government.

In 2019, Thune and Senator Ed Markey co-authored the Telephone Robocall Abuse Criminal Enforcement and Deterrence (TRACED) Act, which became law in December 2019. The legislation, which passed the Senate 97-1, gives federal regulators more authority to combat illegal robocalls by extending the enforcement window from one to three years, increasing civil penalties up to $10,000 per call, requiring call authentication technology, and creating a federal task force to pursue criminal prosecution of robocallers. The bill was supported by all 50 state attorneys general and received overwhelming bipartisan support in both chambers.

=== 119th United States Congress committee assignments ===
- Committee on Agriculture, Nutrition, and Forestry
  - Subcommittee on Commodities, Derivatives, Risk Management, and Trade
  - Subcommittee on Conservation, Forestry, Natural Resources, and Biotechnology
  - Subcommittee on Livestock, Dairy, Poultry, and Food Safety
- Committee on Commerce, Science, and Transportation
  - Subcommittee on Aviation, Space, and Innovation
  - Subcommittee on Consumer Protection, Technology, and Data Privacy
  - Subcommittee on Surface Transportation, Freight, Pipelines, and Safety
  - Subcommittee on Telecommunications and Media
- Committee on Finance
  - Subcommittee on Health Care
  - Subcommittee on International Trade, Customs, and Global Competitiveness
  - Subcommittee on Taxation and IRS Oversight
- Select Committee on Intelligence (ex officio, as Majority Leader)

=== Caucus membership ===
- Afterschool Caucuses
- Congressional Motorcycle Caucus

=== Senate Republican Leader ===
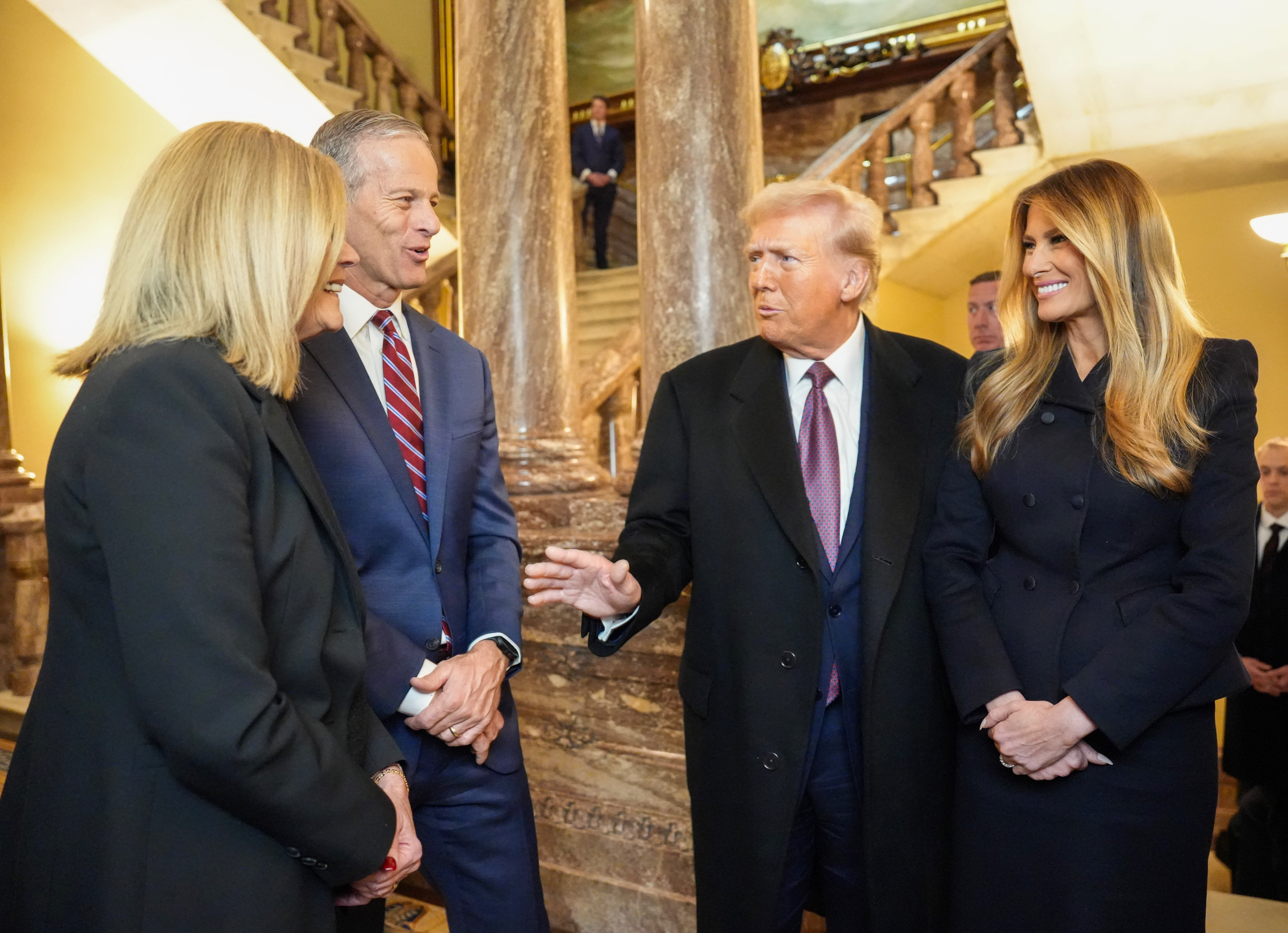
Kimberley and John Thune with President Donald Trump and First Lady Melania Trump, 2025

On November 13, 2024, Thune won the Senate Republican Conference leadership election on the second ballot to become the next Senate majority leader. Thune was chosen to replace the retiring Mitch McConnell following the November 2024 U.S. elections, in which Republicans won control of the Senate. The other candidates were Rick Scott and John Cornyn. The election occurred in a closed-door Republican caucus setting. Thune reportedly defeated Cornyn by a vote of 29-24.

On January 7, 2025, Thune spoke at Jimmy Carter's memorial service at the United States Capitol alongside Vice President Kamala Harris and House Speaker Mike Johnson.

Thune is the first Senate party leader to have first taken office as a senator in the 21st century.

== Political positions ==
Politico has called Thune "unambiguously conservative but temperamentally moderate", a "collaborator instead of a combatant", and an institutionalist.

=== 5G and rural broadband ===
Thune has been a leading advocate for 5G deployment and rural broadband expansion. He introduced the STREAMLINE Small Cell Deployment Act and the Telecommunications Skilled Workforce Act to address infrastructure and workforce challenges for next-generation wireless technology. As chairman of the Communications, Technology, Innovation, and the Internet Subcommittee from 2019 to 2021, he focused on ensuring rural communities' access to 5G technology and precision agriculture applications.

=== Agriculture ===
In March 2019, Thune was among 38 senators to sign a letter to Secretary of Agriculture Sonny Perdue warning that dairy farmers "have continued to face market instability and are struggling to survive the fourth year of sustained low prices" and urging his department to "strongly encourage these farmers to consider the Dairy Margin Coverage program."

=== COVID-19 ===
In May 2020, a group of Senate Republicans planned to introduce a privacy bill that would regulate the data COVID-19 contact-tracing apps collect. Senator Roger Wicker said the legislation would "hold businesses accountable to consumers if they use personal data to fight the COVID-19 pandemic". Thune said the act would permit the creation of "platforms that could trace the virus and help flatten the curve and stop the spread—and maintaining privacy protections for U.S. citizens".

=== Drug policy ===
In December 2017, Thune was among six senators to sign a letter to Senate Majority Leader Mitch McConnell and Minority Leader Chuck Schumer requesting their "help in ensuring the long-term sustainability of the 340B program", a rule mandating that drug companies give discounts to health-care organizations presently serving large numbers of low-income patients.

=== Economy ===
In January 2019, Thune introduced legislation to repeal the estate tax, which applies to couples with estates above $22.4 million.

=== Education ===
In February 2019, Thune was among 20 senators to sponsor the Employer Participation in Repayment Act, enabling employers to contribute up to $5,250 to their employees' student loans.

=== Energy ===
On March 6, 2014, Thune introduced the Reliable Home Heating Act (S. 2086; 113th Congress). The bill would require the Federal Motor Carrier Safety Administration (FMCSA) to exempt motor carriers that transport home heating oil from numerous federal safety regulations if the governor of a state declares a state of emergency caused by a shortage of residential heating fuel. The bill also would require the Energy Information Administration (EIA) to notify states if certain petroleum reserves fall below historical averages.

=== Environment ===
In March 2019, Thune joined all Senate Republicans, three Democrats, and independent Angus King in voting against the Green New Deal resolution. Arguing against its implementation, Thune said the resolution would "absolutely be devastating and disastrous" for the agriculture economy both in South Dakota and across the US.

=== Facebook ===
In May 2016, Thune sent Facebook a letter requesting details on how it operates its Trending Topics feature, after a Gizmodo article cited anonymous sources (claiming to be former Facebook employees) who alleged systemic anti-conservative political bias in how material is selected for display in the list. Some commentators criticized Thune's letter as an example of government overreach against a private company. Facebook denied the bias allegations. Thune thanked Facebook in a public statement.

=== Foreign policy ===
In November 2006, Thune said he believed the U.S. could win the Iraq War through stability. He elaborated, "It's making sure that Iraq can't be a staging ground for terrorist attacks against its neighbors in the region or, worse yet, against the United States." Thune also espoused the position that the Bush administration and a majority of members of Congress would grant military commanders the final decision on when to reduce U.S. military forces there. In July 2008, Thune said that the Bush administration's moves in Iraq had been a "remarkable success", noting civilian casualties had been reduced by 80 percent, and charged Democratic presidential candidate and Senator Barack Obama with failing "to acknowledge the basic fact of the success and result and progress and gains that have been made as a result of the surge."

In December 2010, Thune was among 26 senators who voted against the ratification of New START, a nuclear arms reduction treaty between the United States and the Russian Federation obliging both countries to have no more than 1,550 strategic warheads and 700 launchers deployed during the next seven years, and providing for a continuation of on-site inspections that halted when START I expired the previous year. It was the first arms treaty with Russia in eight years.

In November 2012, Thune and Chuck Grassley requested that Secretary of the Treasury Timothy Geithner provide a review of the Chinese company Wanxiang Group's plan to acquire bankrupt battery maker A123, arguing that the transaction should be reviewed to ensure that U.S. military and taxpayer interests in A123 were protected. In October 2018, Thune requested staff briefings about a Bloomberg report that the Chinese government had implanted malicious hardware into server motherboards, writing charges that "the U.S. hardware supply chain has been purposely tampered with by a foreign power [and] must be taken seriously."

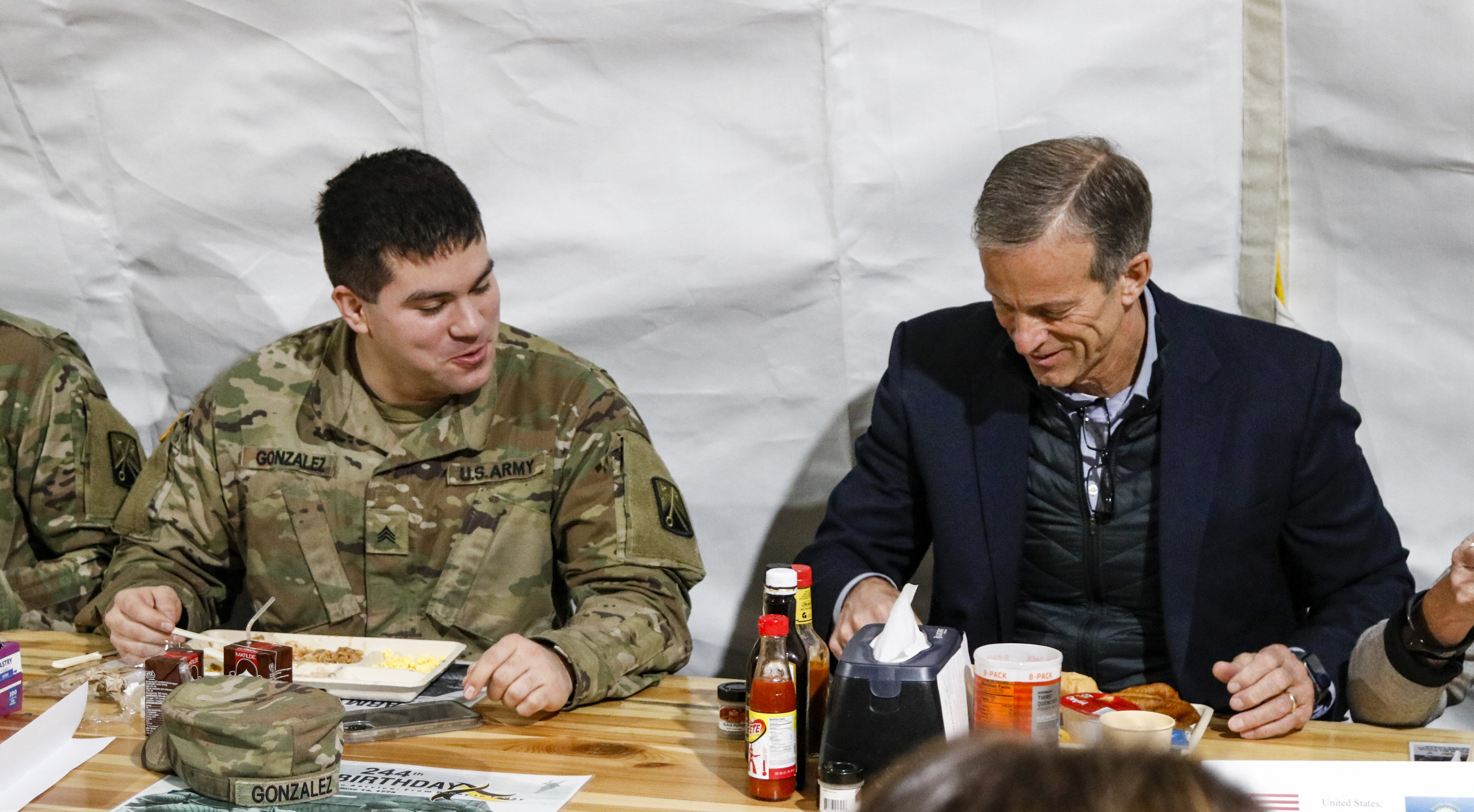
Thune at Powidz Air Base in Poland in 2020

In September 2016, Thune was among 34 senators to sign a letter to Secretary of State John Kerry advocating that the United States use "all available tools to dissuade Russia from continuing its airstrikes in Syria" from an Iranian airbase near Hamadan and stating that the airstrikes violated "a legally binding Security Council Resolution" on Iran. In June 2017, Thune co-sponsored the Israel Anti-Boycott Act (s. 720), which would have made it a federal crime, punishable by a maximum sentence of 20 years' imprisonment, to encourage or participate in boycotts against Israel. In March 2018, Thune voted to table a resolution spearheaded by Bernie Sanders, Chris Murphy, and Mike Lee that would have required President Trump to withdraw American troops either in or influencing Yemen within the next 30 days unless they were combating Al-Qaeda.

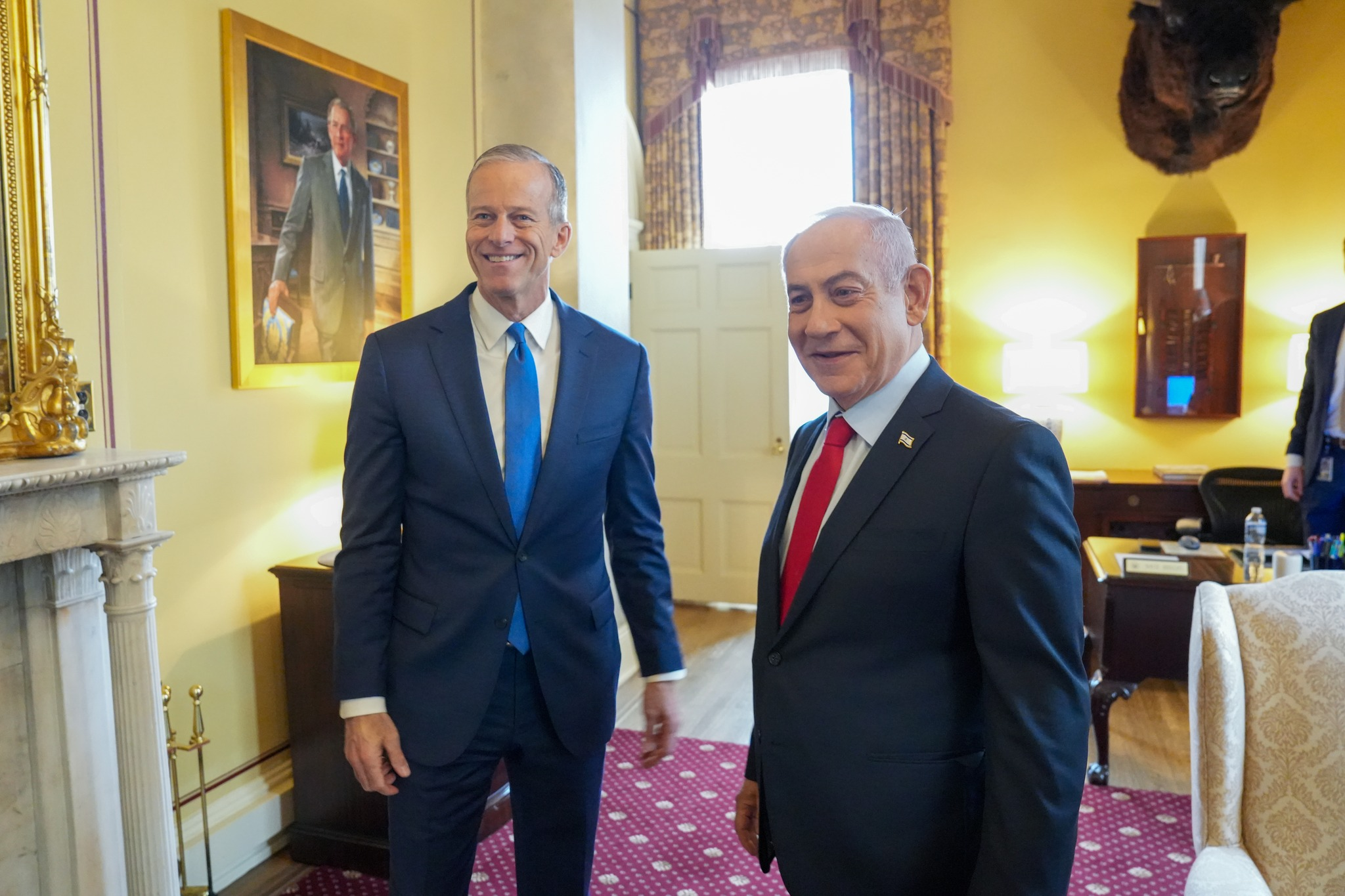
Thune with Israeli Prime Minister Benjamin Netanyahu on February 6, 2025

After the 2022 Russian invasion of Ukraine, Thune said that the Ukrainian people could not sustain the war without military support from the U.S. and other countries. He called on European partners to make robust contributions to help Ukraine. In 2025, Thune supported secondary sanctions against Russia that would impose 500% tariffs on countries that buy Russian oil, natural gas, uranium and other exports.

=== Gun issues ===
Thune advocates gun rights, having sponsored legislation that would allow people with concealed carry permits to use such permits as a valid permit in other states. He also voted against banning standard-capacity magazines of over 10 rounds. On October 3, 2017, Thune became the center of media attention for saying in response to the mass shooting in Las Vegas: "It sounds like [the shooter] used conversion kits and other things, you know, to make the weapons more lethal. We'll look at the facts when we get them all in here. I think a lot of us want to do everything we can to prevent tragedies like that from happening again. You know, it's an open society. And when somebody does what he wants to do it's going to be hard to prevent anything. But I think people are going to have to take steps in their own lives to take precautions. To protect themselves. And in situations like that, you know, try to stay safe. As somebody said, get small."

=== Health care ===
Thune was among 13 senators who drafted the Senate version of the American Health Care Act of 2017. Released on June 22, 2017, the bill was known as the Better Care Reconciliation Act of 2017. In July, Thune said that Republicans would continue trying to repeal the Affordable Care Act regardless of whether that month's effort collapsed: "We are going to vote to repeal and replace Obamacare. It's not a question of if, it's a question of when." On July 25, the Senate voted down The Better Care Reconciliation Act, 43-57.

=== Judiciary ===
In March 2016, about seven months before the next presidential election, Thune declared his opposition to considering President Obama's nominee to the Supreme Court, saying that "the next president should make this lifetime appointment to the Supreme Court" because the "American people deserve to have their voices heard on the nomination of the next Supreme Court justice". In September 2020, less than two months before the next presidential election, Thune supported an immediate vote on Trump's nominee to fill the Supreme Court vacancy caused by Justice Ruth Bader Ginsburg's death.

=== Social Security ===
Thune was among 20 senators to vote against the Social Security Fairness Act in December 2024.

=== Trade ===
In January 2018, Thune was among 36 Republican senators to sign a letter to President Trump requesting he preserve the North American Free Trade Agreement by modernizing it for the economy of the 21st century. In July 2018, as the Trump administration pushed for aid for agricultural producers affected by retaliatory tariffs, Thune said the plan offered a "false and short-term" sense of security and cited the importance of fair and free trade for South Dakota's farmers.

=== 2020 presidential election results ===
In December 2020, Thune said he opposed any further efforts to challenge the 2020 presidential election results. He argued that such efforts would "go down like a shot dog" in the Senate. Then-President Donald Trump, who contended that the election results were illegitimate and that he had defeated Democratic nominee Joe Biden, responded by attacking Thune on Twitter and publicly calling on South Dakota governor Kristi Noem to challenge him in a 2022 U.S. Senate primary (she declined). Thune directly denounced Trump for attempting to overturn the results of the 2020 election and his role in the January 6, 2021, riot at the Capitol. He called his involvement and that of the rioters "inexcusable". Thune voted to certify the 2020 presidential election results.

== Presidential and vice-presidential speculation ==
Before the selection of Sarah Palin, Thune was mentioned as a possible vice-presidential pick for Republican nominee John McCain in the 2008 presidential election. Thune publicly played down the speculation.

Significant speculation arose regarding a potential 2012 presidential bid by Thune. He was encouraged to run by Senate minority leader Mitch McConnell and South Carolina Senator Lindsey Graham, who called him "a consensus builder". The Wall Street Journal wrote that Thune had "name ID in the parts of the first caucus state of Iowa that get neighboring South Dakota media, a $6.9 million bank account he could use for a presidential run, and a national fundraising list of 100,000 names from his race against [former Senator Tom] Daschle." DNC executive director Jennifer O'Malley Dillon publicly said that in a field of generally flawed Republican potential presidential candidates, Thune was the one she feared. Multiple commentators asserted that a Thune presidential candidacy would be helped by his personal appearance. On February 22, 2011, Thune announced he would not run for president in 2012.

During the summer of 2012, the USA Today reported that Thune was on Mitt Romney's short list as a potential running mate. Wisconsin Congressman Paul Ryan was selected instead.

Despite some speculation, Thune declined to seek the presidency in 2016, saying that his "window ... might have closed in 2012".

== Electoral history ==
South Dakota's at-large Congressional district Republican primary election, 1996
Party	Candidate	Votes	%
Republican	John R. Thune	41,322	59.49
Republican	Carole Hillard	28,139	40.51

South Dakota's at-large congressional district: Results 1996–2000
Year	Democratic	Votes	Pct	Republican	Votes	Pct	3rd Party	Party	Votes	Pct	3rd Party	Party	Votes	Pct
1996	Rick Weiland	119,547	37%	John R. Thune	186,393	58%	Stacey L. Nelson	Independent	10,397	3%	Kurt Evans	Independent	6,866	2%
1998	Jeff Moser	64,433	25%	John R. Thune (incumbent)	194,157	75%								
2000	Curt Hohn	78,321	25%	John R. Thune (incumbent)	231,083	73%	Brian Lerohl	Libertarian	5,357	2%				

Senate elections in South Dakota: Results 2002–2022
Year	Democratic	Votes	Pct	Republican	Votes	Pct	3rd Party	Party	Votes	Pct
2002	Tim Johnson (incumbent)	167,481	50%	John R. Thune	166,949	49%	Kurt Evans	Libertarian	3,071	1%
2004	Tom Daschle (incumbent)	193,340	49%	John R. Thune	197,848	51%				
2010				John R. Thune (incumbent)	227,947	100%				
2016	Jay Williams	104,140	28%	John R. Thune (incumbent)	265,516	72%				
2022	Brian Bengs	91,007	26.15%	John R. Thune (incumbent)	242,316	69.63%	Tamara Lesnar	Libertarian	14,697	4.22%

== Personal life ==
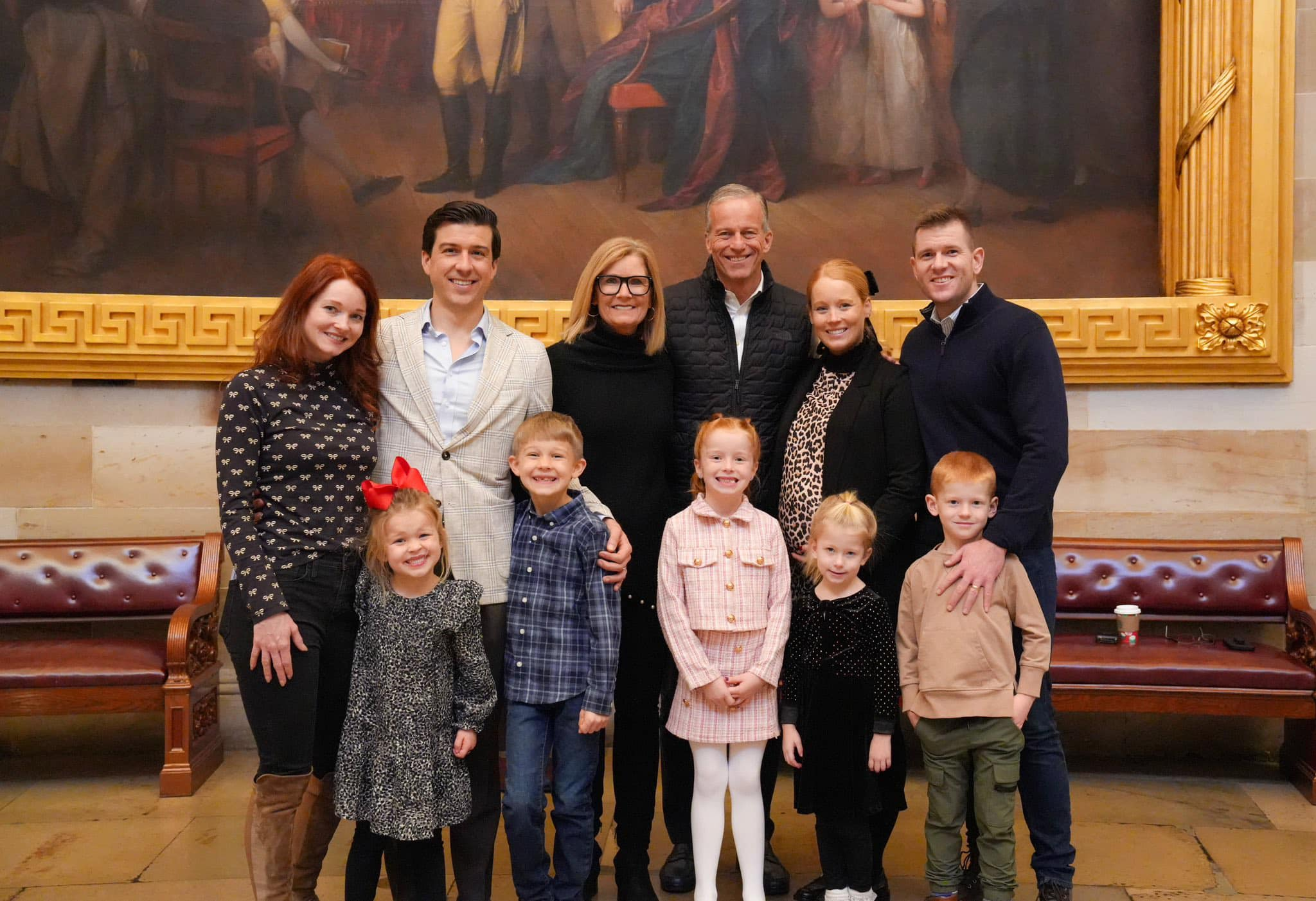
Thune with his family in 2025

Thune is an evangelical, and has been to married Kimberley Weems of Doland, South Dakota, since 1984. They have two daughters and, as of 2025, six grandchildren.

Thune is physically active and has frequently competed in running events. A 2012 Runner's World Magazine feature called Thune "the fastest man in Congress since 2009."

Thune is a fan of the bands Styx, Journey, Boston, and the Doobie Brothers.

U.S. House of Representatives
Preceded by Tim Johnson	Member of the U.S. House of Representatives from South Dakota's at-large congressional district 1997–2003	Succeeded by Bill Janklow
Party political offices
Preceded by Larry Pressler	Republican nominee for U.S. Senator from South Dakota (Class 2); 2002	Succeeded by Joel Dykstra
Preceded by Ron Schmidt	Republican nominee for U.S. Senator from South Dakota (Class 3); 2004, 2010, 2016, 2022	Most recent
Preceded by Bob Bennett	Senate Republican Chief Deputy Whip; 2007–2009	Succeeded by Richard Burr
Preceded by John Cornyn	Vice Chair of the Senate Republican Conference; 2009	Succeeded by Lisa Murkowski
Preceded by John Ensign	Chair of the Senate Republican Policy Committee; 2009–2012	Succeeded by John Barrasso
Preceded by Lamar Alexander	Chair of the Senate Republican Conference; 2012–2019	Succeeded by John Barrasso
Preceded by John Cornyn	Senate Republican Whip; 2019–2025	Succeeded by John Barrasso
Preceded by Mitch McConnell	Senate Republican Leader; 2025–present	Incumbent
U.S. Senate
Preceded by Tom Daschle	U.S. Senator (Class 3) from South Dakota; 2005–present Served alongside: Tim Johnson, Mike Rounds	Incumbent
Preceded by Kay Bailey Hutchison	Ranking Member of the Senate Commerce Committee; 2013–2015	Succeeded by Bill Nelson
Preceded by Jay Rockefeller	Chair of the Senate Commerce Committee; 2015–2019	Succeeded by Roger Wicker
Preceded by John Cornyn	Senate Majority Whip; 2019–2021	Succeeded by Dick Durbin
Preceded by Dick Durbin	Senate Minority Whip; 2021–2025	Succeeded by Dick Durbin
Preceded by Chuck Schumer	Senate Majority Leader; 2025–present	Incumbent
Preceded by Chuck Schumer	Senate Minority Leader; Taking office 2027	Designate
U.S. order of precedence (ceremonial)
Preceded by Chuck Grassley as President pro tempore of the US Senate	Order of precedence of the United States as Senate Majority Leader	Succeeded by Chuck Schumer as Senate Minority Leader
Preceded by Lisa Murkowski	United States senators by seniority 13th	Succeeded by Bernie Sanders
