= 2002 United States Senate election in South Dakota =

- November 5, 2002
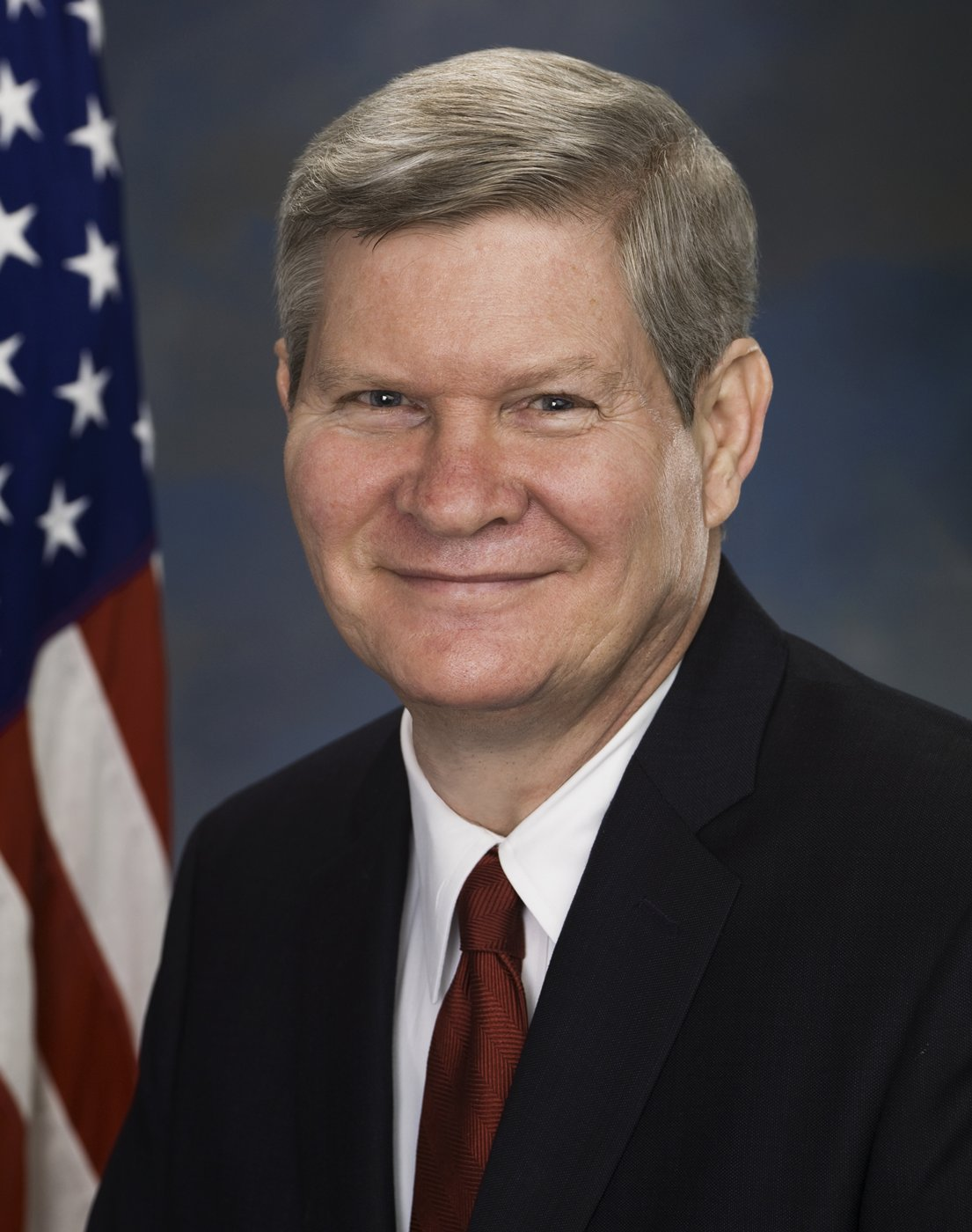

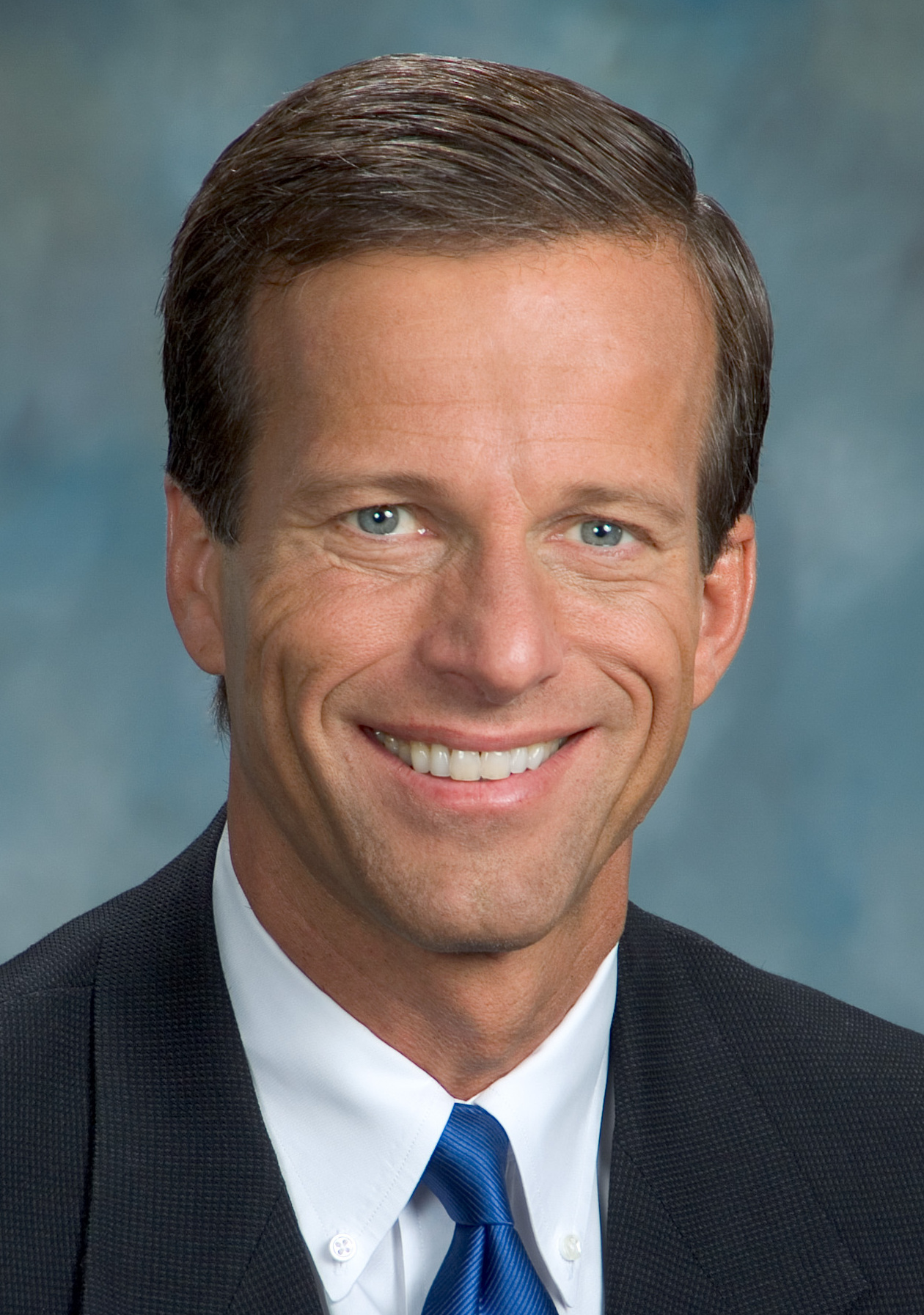
Nominee	Tim Johnson	John Thune
Party	Democratic	Republican
Popular vote	167,481	166,957
Percentage	49.62%	49.47%
- County results Johnson: 50–60% 60–70% 70–80% 80–90% >90% Thune: 40–50% 50–60% 60–70% 70–80%
U.S. senator before election
Tim Johnson
Democratic
Elected U.S. Senator
Tim Johnson
Democratic

The 2002 United States Senate election in South Dakota was held on November 5, 2002. Incumbent Democratic U.S. Senator Tim Johnson narrowly won re-election to a second term over future senator and Senate Majority Leader John Thune by a margin of 524 votes, or 0.15%. This made the election the closest race of the 2002 Senate election cycle.

This was one of the four Democratic-held Senate seats up for election in a state that George W. Bush won in the 2000 presidential election. Thune has held South Dakota's other Senate seat since 2005, and became the Senate Majority Leader after the 2024 elections.

== Democratic primary ==
=== Candidates ===
- Tim Johnson, incumbent U.S. Senator
- Herman Eilers

=== Results ===
Democratic primary results
Party	Candidate	Votes	%
Democratic	Tim Johnson (incumbent)	65,438	94.84%
Democratic	Herman Eilers	3,558	5.16%
Total votes		68,996	100.00%

== General election ==
=== Candidates ===
- Kurt Evans (L), teacher
- Tim Johnson (D), incumbent U.S. Senator
- John Thune (R), U.S. Representative

=== Campaign ===
Thune ran against Tim Johnson, who narrowly won his first senate election in 1996. Thune launched a television advertising campaign mentioning al Qaeda and Saddam Hussein, contending that both are seeking nuclear weapons and that this country needs a missile defense system, something Johnson voted against 29 times and that Thune supports. The incumbent attacked Thune for politicizing national security. President George W. Bush campaigned for Thune in late October. More than $20 million was spent in the election. Both candidates had raised over $5 million each.

=== Debates ===
- Complete video of debate, August 27, 2002
- Complete video of debate, October 7, 2002
- Complete video of debate, October 21, 2002
- Complete video of debate, October 24, 2002

=== Predictions ===
Source	Ranking	As of
Sabato's Crystal Ball	Lean D	November 4, 2002

=== Results ===
Johnson narrowly prevailed over Thune by a mere 524 votes. Despite the extremely close results, Thune did not contest the results and conceded defeat on the late afternoon of November 9. Johnson's narrow victory may be attributed to his strong support in Oglala Lakota County, and to Thune also underperforming in typically Republican areas. Johnson was sworn in for a second term on January 3, 2003. Thune was elected to South Dakota's other Senate seat in 2004, defeating incumbent minority leader Tom Daschle. He served alongside Johnson until the latter retired in 2015.

General election results
Party	Candidate	Votes	%	±%
Democratic	Tim Johnson (incumbent)	167,481	49.62%	−1.70%
Republican	John Thune	166,957	49.47%	+0.79%
Libertarian	Kurt Evans	3,070	0.91%	
Total votes		334,438	100.00%	N/A
Democratic hold				

==== Counties that flipped from Democratic to Republican ====
- Union (largest city: Dakota Dunes)
- Davison (largest city: Mitchell)
- Gregory (largest city: Gregory)
- Hamlin (largest city: Estelline)
- Lincoln (largest city: Sioux Falls)
- Turner (largest city: Parker)

==== Counties that flipped from Republican to Democratic ====
- Bennett (largest city: Martin)
- Corson (largest city: McLaughlin)
- Mellette (largest city: White River)

== See also ==
- 2002 United States Senate elections
