= South Dakota's 5th legislative district =

American legislative district

South Dakota's 5th State Senate district

South Dakota's 5th legislative district is one of 35 districts in the South Dakota Legislature. Each district is represented by 1 senator and 2 representatives. In the Senate, it has been represented by Republican Glen Vilhauer since 2025. In the House, it has been represented by Republicans Matt Roby and Josephine Garcia since 2025.

== Geography ==
The district is located within the city of Watertown in Codington County, located in northeastern South Dakota. The district is completely surrounded by the 4th district.

== Recent election results ==
South Dakota legislators are elected to two-year terms, with each permitted to serve a maximum of four consecutive two-year terms. Elections are held every even-numbered year.

=== State senate elections ===
Year	Incumbent	Party	First elected	Result	General election	Primary elections
2024	Glen Vilhauer	Republican	2024	Incumbent retired. Republican hold.	▌ ✓ Glen Vilhauer (Republican) 71.1%; ▌ Dennis Solberg (Democratic) 28.9%	
2022	Lee Schoenbeck	Republican	2018	Incumbent re-elected.	▌ ✓ Lee Schoenbeck (Republican) 100%	Republican: ▌ ✓ Lee Schoenbeck (inc.) 58.7%; ▌ Colin Paulsen 41.3%
2020	Lee Schoenbeck	Republican	2018	Incumbent re-elected.	▌ ✓ Lee Schoenbeck (Republican) 79.0%; ▌ Adam Jewell (Libertarian) 21.0%	
2018	Neal Tapio	Republican	2016	Incumbent retired. Republican hold.	▌ ✓ Lee Schoenbeck (Republican) 100%	Republican: ▌ ✓ Lee Schoenbeck (inc.) 59.0%; ▌ Byron Callies 41.0%
2016	Ried Holien	Republican	2010	Incumbent retired. Republican hold.	▌ ✓ Neal Tapio (Republican) 82.6%	Republican: ▌ ✓ Neal Tapio (inc.) 54.3%; ▌ Roger Solum 45.7%
2014	Ried Holien	Republican	2010	Incumbent re-elected.	▌ ✓ Ried Holien (Republican) 100%	
2012	Ried Holien	Republican	2010	Incumbent re-elected.	▌ ✓ Ried Holien (Republican) 60.5%; ▌ Nybe Bratch (Democratic) 39.5%	

=== State House of Representatives elections ===
Year	Incumbent	Party	Result	General election	Primary elections
2024	Matt Roby (Seat 1); Josephine Garcia (Seat 2)	Republican	Republican hold.	▌ ✓ Matt Roby (Republican) 45%; ▌ ✓ Josephine Garcia (Republican) 31.9%; ▌ Diane Drake (Democratic) 12.5%; ▌ Amy Rambow (Democratic) 10.6%	Republican: ▌ ✓ Matt Roby 45.8%; ▌ ✓ Josephine Garcia 27.4%; ▌ Byron Callies - 26.8%
2022	Hugh Bartels (Seat 1); Byron Callies (Seat 2)	Republican	Republican hold.	▌ ✓ Hugh Bartels (Republican) 45.5%; ▌ ✓ Byron Callies (Republican) 32.7%; ▌ Kahden Mooney (Democratic) 21.9%	
2020	Hugh Bartels (Seat 1); Nancy York (Seat 2)	Republican	Republican hold.	▌ ✓ Hugh Bartels (Republican) 54.2%; ▌ ✓ Nancy York (Republican) 45.8%	Republican: ▌ ✓ Hugh Bartels (Republican) 42.3%; ▌ ✓ Nancy York (Republican) 39.6%; ▌ Jacob Sigurdson (Republican) 18.1%
2018	Nancy York (Seat 1); Hugh Bartels (Seat 2)	Republican	Republican hold.	▌ ✓ Nancy York (Republican) 33.7%; ▌ ✓ Hugh Bartels (Republican) 33.7%; ▌ Brett Ries (Democratic) 22.1%; ▌Diana Hane (Democratic) 10.5%	
2016	Hugh Bartels (Seat 1); Nancy York (Seat 2)	Republican	Republican hold.	▌ ✓ Hugh Bartels (Republican) 35.7%; ▌ ✓ Nancy York (Republican) 33.1%; ▌ Michelle Alvine (Democratic) 19.5%; ▌ Chuck Haan (Independent) 11.7%	
2014	Lee Schoenbeck (Seat 1); Roger Solum (Seat 2)	Republican	Republican hold.	▌ ✓ Lee Schoenbeck (Republican) 50.3%; ▌ ✓ Roger Solum (Republican) 49.7%	
2012	Melissa Magstadt (Seat 1); Roger Solum (Seat 2)	Republican	Republican hold.	▌ ✓ Melissa Magstadt (Republican) 40.1%; ▌ ✓ Roger Solum (Republican) 39.4%; ▌ Dorothy Kellogg (Democratic) 20.5%	
