= South Dakota's 4th legislative district =

American legislative district

[[South Dakota House|]]
Kent Roe
Dylan C. Jordan

South Dakota's 4th legislative district is one of 35 districts in the South Dakota Legislature. Each district is represented by 1 senator and 2 representatives. In the Senate, it has been represented by Republican John Wiik since 2017. In the House, it has been represented by Republicans Kent Roe and Dylan C. Jordan since 2025. It was previously represented by Republicans Stephanie Sauder since 2023 and Fred Deutsch since 2019.

== Geography ==
The district is located in northeastern South Dakota, containing Clark, Codington, Deuel, Grant, Hamlin, and Roberts county. The district completely surrounds the 5th district in Watertown.

== Recent election results ==
South Dakota legislators are elected to two-year terms, with each permitted to serve a maximum of four consecutive two-year terms. Elections are held every even-numbered year.

=== State senate elections ===
Year	Incumbent	Party	First elected	Result	Candidates
2024	John Wiik	Republican	2004	Incumbent term-limited. Republican hold.	▌ ✓ Stephanie Sauder (Republican) 100%
2022	John Wiik	Republican	2016	Incumbent re-elected.	▌ ✓ John Wiik (Republican) 100%
2020	John Wiik	Republican	2016	Incumbent re-elected.	▌ ✓ John Wiik (Republican) 82.6%; ▌ Daryl Root (Libertarian) 17.4%
2018	John Wiik	Republican	2016	Incumbent re-elected.	▌ ✓ John Wiik (Republican) 64.8%; ▌ Dennis Evenson (Democratic) 35.2%
2016	Jim Peterson	Democratic	2004	Incumbent retired. Republican gain.	▌ ✓ John Wiik (Republican) 60.4%; ▌ Kathy Tyler (Democratic) 39.6%
2014	Jim Peterson	Democratic	2004	Incumbent re-elected.	▌ ✓ Jim Peterson 100%
