= Solum (disambiguation) =

Solum is a term in soils science.

Solum may also refer to:

== Places ==
- Solum Municipality, a former municipality in Telemark county, Norway
- Solum Lake, a lake in Minnesota

== People ==
- Burdette Solum, a South Dakota politician
- Gunnar Solum, a Norwegian politician
- John Solum, a musician
- Roger Solum, a South Dakota politician
