= Margaret Gillespie =

Margaret Gillespie may refer to:

- Margaret V. Gillespie, American politician
- Margaret Gillespie (singer), Scottish singer
- Margaret Cousins, née Gillespie, Irish-Indian educationist, suffragist and Theosophist
