= Byron Callies =

American politician

Member of the South Dakota House of Representatives from the 5th district
- In office January 10, 2023 – January 14, 2025 Serving with Hugh Bartels
- Preceded by: Nancy York
- Succeeded by: Josephine Garcia; Matt Roby

Personal details
- Party: Republican

Byron Callies is an American politician currently serving in the South Dakota House of Representatives. First elected in 2022, he has represented South Dakota's 5th legislative district as a Republican since 2023. Before serving as representative, he was a luitenient colonel in the U.S. military and worked with the South Dakota Department of Energy. In 2018, Callies ran for state senate from District 5, but was defeated in the primaries.

== Committees ==
House Commerce and Energy - Member
House Education - Member
House Military and Veterans Affairs Committee - Member

== Electoral history ==
Year	Incumbents	Party	First elected	Result	General election	Primary elections
2022	Hugh Bartels	Republican	2017	Incumbent re-elected.	▌ ✓ Hugh Bartels (Republican) 45.5%; ▌ ✓ Byron Callies (Republican) 32.7%; ▌Kahden Mooney (Democratic) 21.9%	Uncontested
2022	Nancy York	Republican	2017	Incumbent retired. Republican hold.	▌ ✓ Hugh Bartels (Republican) 45.5%; ▌ ✓ Byron Callies (Republican) 32.7%; ▌Kahden Mooney (Democratic) 21.9%	Uncontested
