= List of people from Sioux Falls =

This is a list of notable residents from Sioux Falls, South Dakota.

== Politics ==
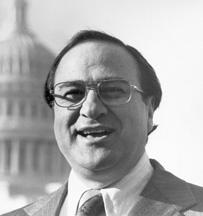
James Abourezk

- James Abourezk, first Arab-American U.S. senator, practiced law in Sioux Falls
- George Jonathan Danforth, South Dakota politician
- Karl Dean, former mayor of Nashville, Tennessee
- William Dougherty, South Dakota politician
- James D. Ford, former Chaplain of the United States House of Representatives
- George Barnes Grigsby, delegate to Congress from Alaska Territory
- John T. Grigsby, Lieutenant Governor of South Dakota
- Sioux K. Grigsby, Lieutenant Governor of South Dakota
- Donald A. Haggar, lawyer and legislator
- Stephanie Herseth Sandlin, U.S. representative from South Dakota's at-large congressional district, current President of Augustana University
- Crystal Johnson, state's attorney for Minnehaha County
- David Lillehaug, associate justice of the Minnesota Supreme Court and Attorney General of Minnesota
- MK Pritzker, First Lady of Illinois
- A. J. Rosier, Wyoming state senator
- John Thune, South Dakota senator; U.S. Senate Majority Leader

== Business ==
- Christine Olson, businesswoman and state legislator

== Artists and entertainment ==
=== Acting, motion pictures, and television ===
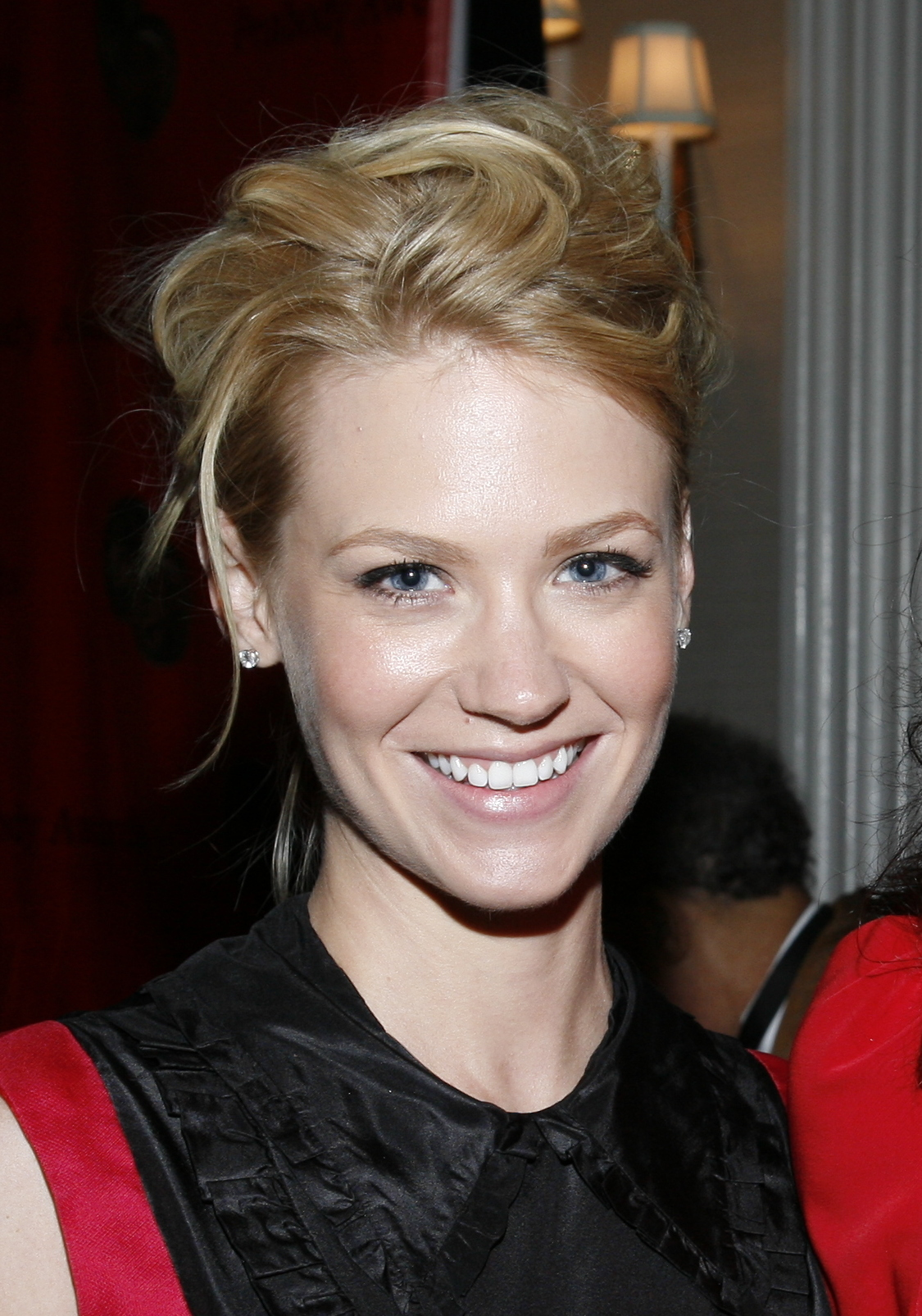
January Jones

- Brian Cummings, voice actor
- Mary Hart, television personality, Entertainment Tonight
- January Jones, actress, best known for playing Betty Draper on Mad Men
- Gail Matthius, actress, cast member on Saturday Night Live
- Pat O'Brien, television personality, Access Hollywood
- David Soul, actor, co-star of Starsky & Hutch
- Joan Tabor, actress
- Jerry verDorn, actor, Guiding Light and One Life to Live

=== Music ===
- Erika M. Anderson, aka EMA, musician and digital media artist
- George Botsford, composer and pianist, noted for the "Black and White Rag"
- Chris Darrow, multi-instrumentalist and singer-songwriter
- David Stenshoel, musician (Boiled in Lead)
- Mato Wayuhi, composer, rapper, producer, musician, actor

=== Authors ===
- Jacob M. Appel, author, wrote Coulrophobia & Fata Morgana while living in Sioux Falls
- Allison Hedge Coke, writer and educator
- Herbert Krause, author (1905–1976)
- Milton J. Nieuwsma, author, screenwriter, producer

=== Visual artists ===
- Chris Browne, comic strip artist and cartoonist, Hägar the Horrible

== Sports ==
=== Baseball ===
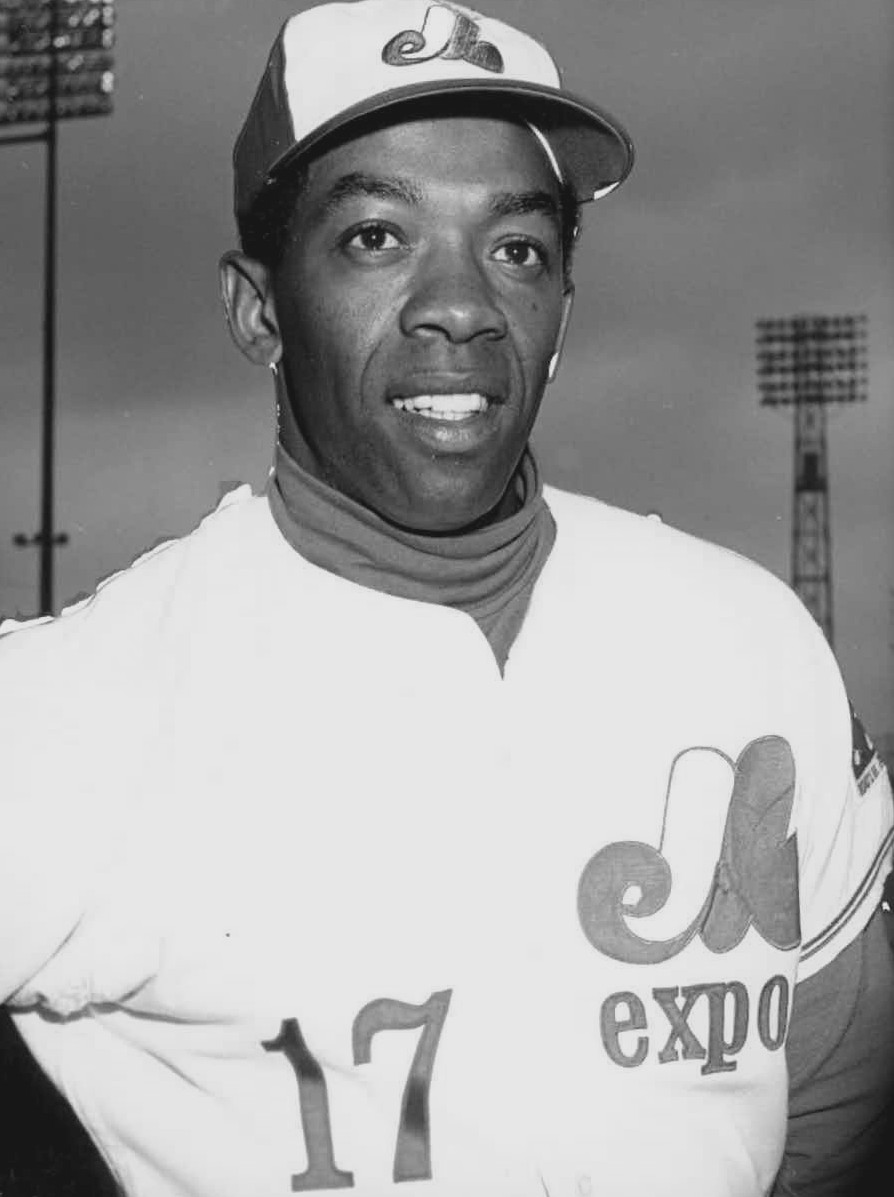
Donn Clendenon

- Benny Castillo, 11-year minor league baseball player and manager
- Donn Clendenon, MLB first baseman
- Dusty Coleman, MLB infielder
- Terry Forster, pitcher for five MLB teams

=== Boxing and martial arts ===
- Shayna Baszler, former MMA fighter and professional wrestler
- Devin Clark, UFC mixed martial artist
- Nick Dinsmore, WWE wrestler 1999–2009 and WWE coach 2012–2015

=== Football ===
- Dallas Clark, professional football player
- Cooper DeJean, NFL player for the Philadelphia Eagles
- Neil Graff, quarterback for several NFL teams
- Mike Martz, former head coach of NFL's St. Louis Rams, born in Sioux Falls

=== Hockey ===
- Walker Duehr, professional ice hockey player, played in the National Hockey League

== Military ==
- Oscar Randolph Fladmark, World War II and Korean War fighter pilot, recipient of the Distinguished Flying Cross (United States)
- Joe Foss, World War II "ace of aces" fighter pilot, first commissioner of the American Football League; 20th governor of South Dakota
- Melvin Grigsby, American Civil War and Spanish–American War veteran who served as Attorney General of South Dakota

== Other notable residents ==
- Wallace Dow, architect
- Michael E. Fossum, astronaut
- Shane Van Boening, professional pool player
