= George Danforth =

George Danforth may refer to:

- George Jonathan Danforth (1875–1952), member of the South Dakota Senate
- George F. Danforth (1819–1899), American lawyer and politician from New York
