= Joel Dykstra =

American businessman and politician

Member of the South Dakota House of Representatives from the 16th district
- In office January 14, 2003 – January 13, 2009 Serving with Margaret V. Gillespie
- Preceded by: Mike Broderick
- Succeeded by: Jim Bolin; Dan Lederman

Personal details
- Born: February 13, 1958 (age 68) Canton, South Dakota, U.S.
- Party: Republican
- Spouse: Vicki
- Children: 3
- Education: Oral Roberts University (BS)
- Profession: CEO of Global Services Group, Inc.

Joel D. Dykstra (born February 13, 1958) is an American businessman and politician who served as a Republican member of the South Dakota House of Representatives, who represented the 16th District from 2003 to 2009. His district included Lincoln and Union counties.

In 1980 Dykstra graduated from Oral Roberts University in Tulsa, Oklahoma with a degree in Business Management. Dykstra has three daughters and one granddaughter. He and his family lived in Europe for nine years while Dykstra worked for Lasmo Energy.

In 2007, Dykstra announced his candidacy for United States Senate, vying for the seat then held by incumbent Senator Tim Johnson (D). Dykstra was defeated on November 4, 2008, when Senator Johnson held onto his Senate seat by a margin of approximately 62.5% to 37.5%.

== See also ==
- 2008 United States Senate election in South Dakota

== Notes ==
Party political offices
Preceded by John Thune	Republican nominee for United States Senator from South Dakota (Class 2); 2008	Succeeded by Mike Rounds
