= Matt Roby =

American politician (born 1984)

Member of the South Dakota House of Representatives from the 5th district
- Incumbent
- Assumed office January 2025
- Preceded by: Hugh Bartels and Byron Callies

Personal details
- Born: Matthew Thomas Roby; May 14, 1984 (age 42) Watertown, South Dakota, U.S.
- Party: Republican
- Spouse: Stefanie Roby
- Children: 4
- Education: University of Nebraska–Lincoln (BS); University of St. Thomas (JD)

Matthew Thomas Roby (born May 14, 1984) is an American politician and attorney serving as a member of the South Dakota House of Representatives from the 5th district. He is a member of the Republican Party.

== Early life and education ==
Roby was born in Watertown, South Dakota in 1984. He earned a Bachelor of Science degree from the University of Nebraska–Lincoln and a Juris Doctor from the University of St. Thomas.

== Career ==
Roby initially worked as a state prosecutor for the office of the Attorney General of South Dakota. From 2017 to the point of his election, Roby served as the City Attorney of Watertown
