= John Wiik =

American politician

Chair of the South Dakota Republican Party
- In office January 14, 2023 – February 22, 2025
- Preceded by: Dan Lederman
- Succeeded by: Jim Eschenbaum

Member of the South Dakota Senate from the 4th district
- Incumbent
- Assumed office January 10, 2017
- Preceded by: Jim Peterson

Member of the South Dakota House of Representatives from the 4th district
- In office January 13, 2015 – January 10, 2017
- Preceded by: Kathy Tyler; Jim Peterson
- Succeeded by: Jason Kettwig; John Mills

Personal details
- Born: March 28, 1972 (age 54) Ortonville, Minnesota, U.S.
- Party: Republican
- Education: Interstate Business College

John Wiik (born March 28, 1972) is an American politician who has served in the South Dakota Senate from the 4th district since 2017. He previously served in the South Dakota House of Representatives from the 4th district from 2015 to 2017.

Party political offices
Preceded by Dan Lederman	Chair of the South Dakota Republican Party; 2023–2025	Succeeded by Jim Eschenbaum
