= Jim Bolin =

American politician

Member of the South Dakota House of Representatives from the 16th district
- Incumbent
- Assumed office January 2009 Serving with Dan Lederman (2009–2011); Patty Miller (2011 – March 27, 2013); David Anderson (May 13, 2013 – present)

Personal details
- Born: December 31, 1950 (age 75) Portland, Oregon, U.S.
- Party: Republican
- Education: Seattle Pacific University (BA); University of South Dakota (MA)
- Website: votebolin.com

James 'Jim' W. Bolin (born December 31, 1950, in Portland, Oregon) is an American politician and a Republican member of the South Dakota House of Representatives representing District 16 since January 2009. Bolin was the mayor of Canton, South Dakota, from 2007 until 2008.

== Education ==
Bolin earned his BA from Seattle Pacific University and his MA from the University of South Dakota. He is a former teacher.

== Elections ==
=== South Dakota state Senate ===
- 2016 After serving his fourth term in the South Dakota House of Representatives, Bolin was term-limited from running again in the House. Bolin ran unopposed in the District 16 Republican Primary for the South Dakota Senate. In the general election, Bolin is running against Chad Skiles, a Democrat from Canton.

=== South Dakota House of Representatives ===
- 2014 Bolin ran in the District 16 Republican Primary for the South Dakota House of Representatives. In the Republican Primary, out of a total of 3156 votes cast, Bolin received 1329, Anderson received 1049, and Kevin D. Jensen, who did not advance, received 778. Bolin and Anderson advanced to the general election, where they were unopposed.
- 2012 Bolin and Representative Patty Miller were challenged in the four-way June 5, 2012, Republican Primary, where Bolin placed first with 864 votes (40.9%); in the four-way November 6, 2012, General election Bolin took the first seat with 6,760 votes (35.7%) and Representative Miller took the second seat ahead of returning 2010 Democratic challenger Ann Tornberg and Stanley Jacobson.
- 2010 With incumbent Republican Representative Lederman running for South Dakota Senate and leaving a District 16 seat open, Bolin and Patty Miller were unopposed for both the June 8, 2010, Republican Primary; in the three-way November 2, 2010, General election, Miller took the first seat and Bolin took the second seat with 4,821 votes (34.76%) ahead of Democratic nominee Ann Tornberg.
- 2008 When District 16 incumbent Democratic Representative Margaret V. Gillespie ran for South Dakota Senate and Republican Representative Joel Dykstra left the Legislature leaving both District 16 seats open, Bolin ran in the three-way June 3, 2008, Republican Primary and placed second with 1,224 votes (25.8%); in the four-way November 4, 2008, General election fellow Republican nominee Dan Lederman took the first seat and Bolin took the second seat with 5,377 votes (27.61%) ahead of Democratic nominees Janelle O'Connor and Brian Wells.
