= Dan Lederman =

American politician

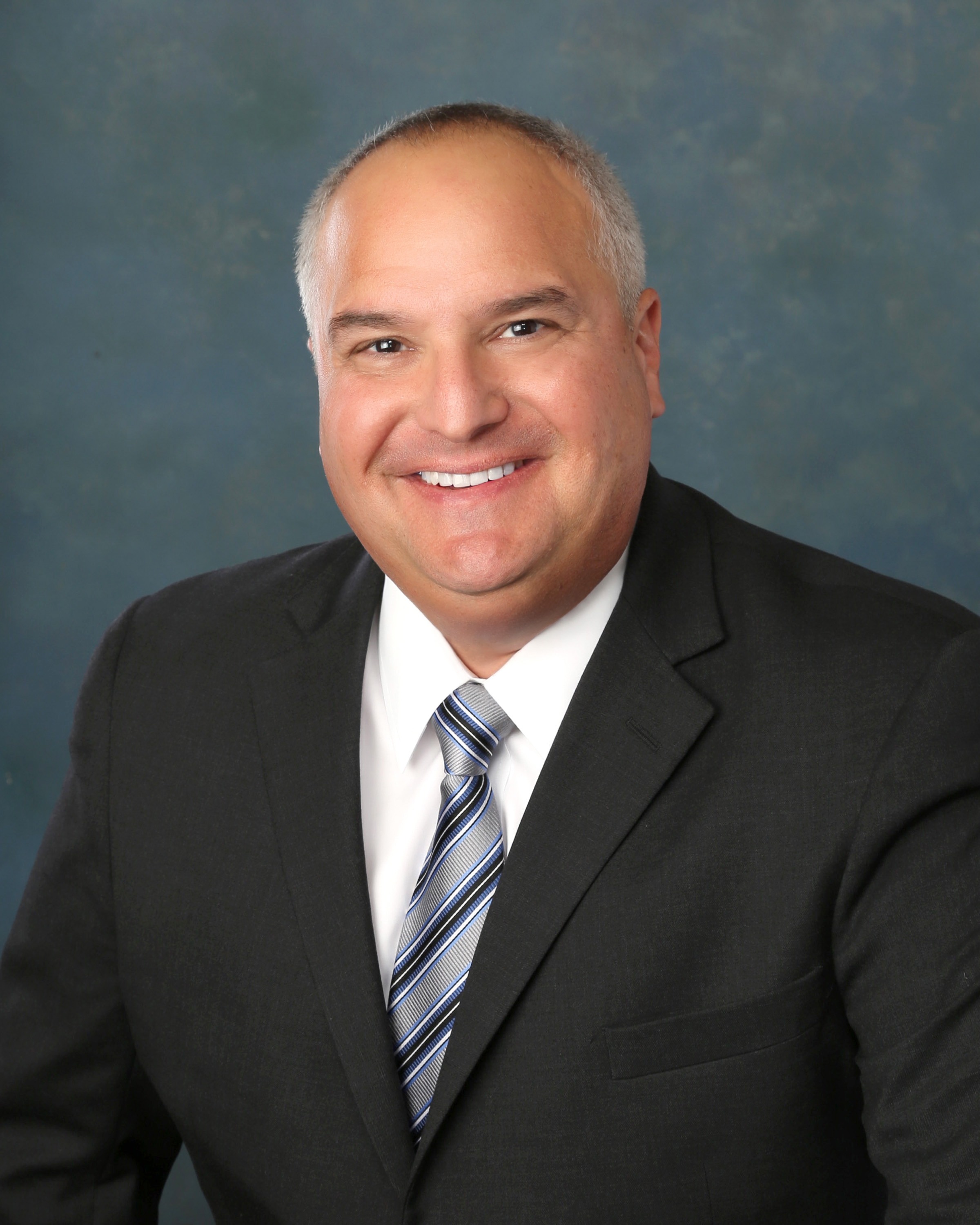

Chair of the South Dakota Republican Party
- In office February 11, 2017 – January 14, 2023
- Preceded by: Pam Roberts
- Succeeded by: John Wiik

Member of the South Dakota Senate from the 16th district
- In office January 11, 2011 – March 30, 2015
- Preceded by: Margaret V. Gillespie
- Succeeded by: Jim Bolin

Member of the South Dakota House of Representatives from the 16th district
- In office January 9, 2009 – January 11, 2011
- Preceded by: Joel Dykstra; Margaret V. Gillespie
- Succeeded by: David Anderson; Jim Bolin

Personal details
- Born: November 25, 1972 (age 53) Waterloo, Iowa, U.S.
- Party: Republican
- Education: University of Iowa (BA)

Dan Lederman (born November 25, 1972) is an American politician who served as a Republican member of the South Dakota Senate representing District 16 from January 11, 2011, until he resigned on March 30, 2015. Lederman served consecutively in the South Dakota Legislature from January 2009 until January 11, 2011, in the South Dakota House of Representatives District 16 seat.

In February 2017, Lederman was elected State Chairman of the South Dakota Republican Party in the first contested party chair election in decades. In February 2019, Lederman was re-elected on an uncontested basis to another term of office as chair of the South Dakota Republican Party. In January 2023, Lederman did not seek re-election and was succeeded by John Wiik.

== Education ==
Lederman received his combat medic training at United States Army Medical Department Center and studied fine arts and religion at the University of Iowa.

== Employment ==
Since the late 1990s, Lederman has been a partner in the family owned Lederman Bail Bonds business, founded by his father.

Lederman serves as a Senior Advisor to Des Moines, IA based LS2 Group, working in grassroots organizing, media relations, political event planning, and social media for the organization. On October 12, 2016, Lederman registered with the Department of Justice's Foreign Agents Registration Act (FARA) office as an agent of the Kingdom of Saudi Arabia for purposes of lobbying for changes to the Justice Against Sponsors of Terrorism Act (JASTA). Projecting a fee of $8,500 for his services, Lederman registered in his capacity as a senior advisor at LS2 Group. LS2group received $76,500 in compensation for its work on the Saudi campaign against JASTA.

== Elections ==
=== South Dakota House of Representatives ===
- 2006 To challenge House District 16 incumbent Democratic Representative Margaret V. Gillespie, Lederman and incumbent Republican Representative Joel Dykstra were unopposed for the June 6, 2006, Republican Primary, but in the four-way November 7, 2006, General election Republican Representative Dykstra took the first seat and Democratic Representative Gillespie took the second seat ahead of Lederman and Democratic nominee Ron Jenkins.
- 2008 When District 16 incumbent Democratic Representative Gillespie ran for South Dakota Senate and Republican Representative Dykstra left the Legislature leaving both District 16 seats open, Lederman ran in the three-way June 3, 2008, Republican Primary and placed first with 2,546 votes (53.69%); in the four-way November 4, 2008, General election Lederman took the first seat with 6,594 votes (33.86%) and fellow Republican nominee Jim Bolin took the second seat ahead of Democratic nominees Janelle O'Connor and Brian Wells.
- 2010 When Senate District 16 incumbent Democratic Senator Gillespie left the Legislature and left the seat open, Lederman was unopposed for the June 8, 2010, Republican Primary and won the November 2, 2010, General election with 6,082 votes (62.71%) against Democratic nominee Kathy Hill.
- 2012 Lederman was unopposed for the June 5, 2012, Republican Primary and won the November 6, 2012, General election with 6,604 votes (60.04%) against Democratic nominee Michael O'Connor.

=== South Dakota State Senate ===
- 2014 In the race for District 16 State Senate, Lederman defeated Democrat Ann Tornberg on a vote of 56% to 44%. With Lederman's election to State Chair of the South Dakota Republican Party, he again found himself at opposite political positions with Tornberg, who herself had been elected to be chairwoman of the South Dakota Democratic Party. Lederman resigned on March 30, 2015.

=== South Dakota Presidential Elector ===
- 2020 Lederman served as an elector for the 2020 presidential election, replacing Kristi Noem. Lederman voted for President Donald Trump for president and Vice-President Mike Pence for vice president.

== Electoral history ==
South Dakota State Senate, District 16, General Election, 2014
| Party | Candidate | Votes | % |
|---|---|---|---|
| Republican | Dan Lederman | 4,442.0 | 55.6 |
| Democratic | Ann Tornberg | 3,543.0 | 44.4 |
| Total votes | | 7,985.0 | 100 |

South Dakota State Senate, District 16, General Election, 2012
| Party | Candidate | Votes | % |
|---|---|---|---|
| Republican | Dan Lederman | 6,604.0 | 60.0 |
| Democratic | Michael O'Connor | 4,395.0 | 40.0 |
| Total votes | | 10,999.0 | 100 |

South Dakota State Senate, District 16, General Election, 2010
| Party | Candidate | Votes | % |
|---|---|---|---|
| Republican | Dan Lederman | 6,082.0 | 62.71 |
| Democratic | Kathy Hill | 3,616.0 | 37.29 |
| Total votes | | 9,698.0 | 100 |

South Dakota House of Representatives, District 16, General Election, 2008
| Party | Candidate | Votes | % |
|---|---|---|---|
| Republican | Dan Lederman | 6,594.0 | 33.86 |
| Republican | Jim Bolin | 5,377.0 | 27.61 |
| Democratic | Janelle M. O'Connor | 4,296.0 | 22.06 |
| Democratic | Brian L. Wells | 3,210.0 | 16.48 |
| Total votes | | 19,477.0 | 100 |

== Voter registration controversy ==
On October 11, 2017, Republican Gubernatorial Candidate Lora Hubbel sent out a press release claiming Lederman's Iowa voter registration was still in force. In reporting the story, the media noted that Hubbel had changed parties herself a few months earlier. In an interview with KELO radio, South Dakota Secretary of State Shantel Krebs indicated that since Lederman used "Dan Lederman" when he originally registered in Iowa and "Daniel Isaac Lederman" when registering in South Dakota, the name was not removed from the Iowa voter roll at the time, because it " would not be an exact match and wouldn't have been caught in the de-duplicating process that Secretary of States use." Lederman responded to the candidate's criticism in an op-ed released to the media the following day titled "OK to change parties in America.

Party political offices
| Preceded by Pam Roberts | Chair of the South Dakota Republican Party; 2017–2023 | Succeeded by John Wiik |
