= 2008 United States Senate election in South Dakota =

- November 4, 2008
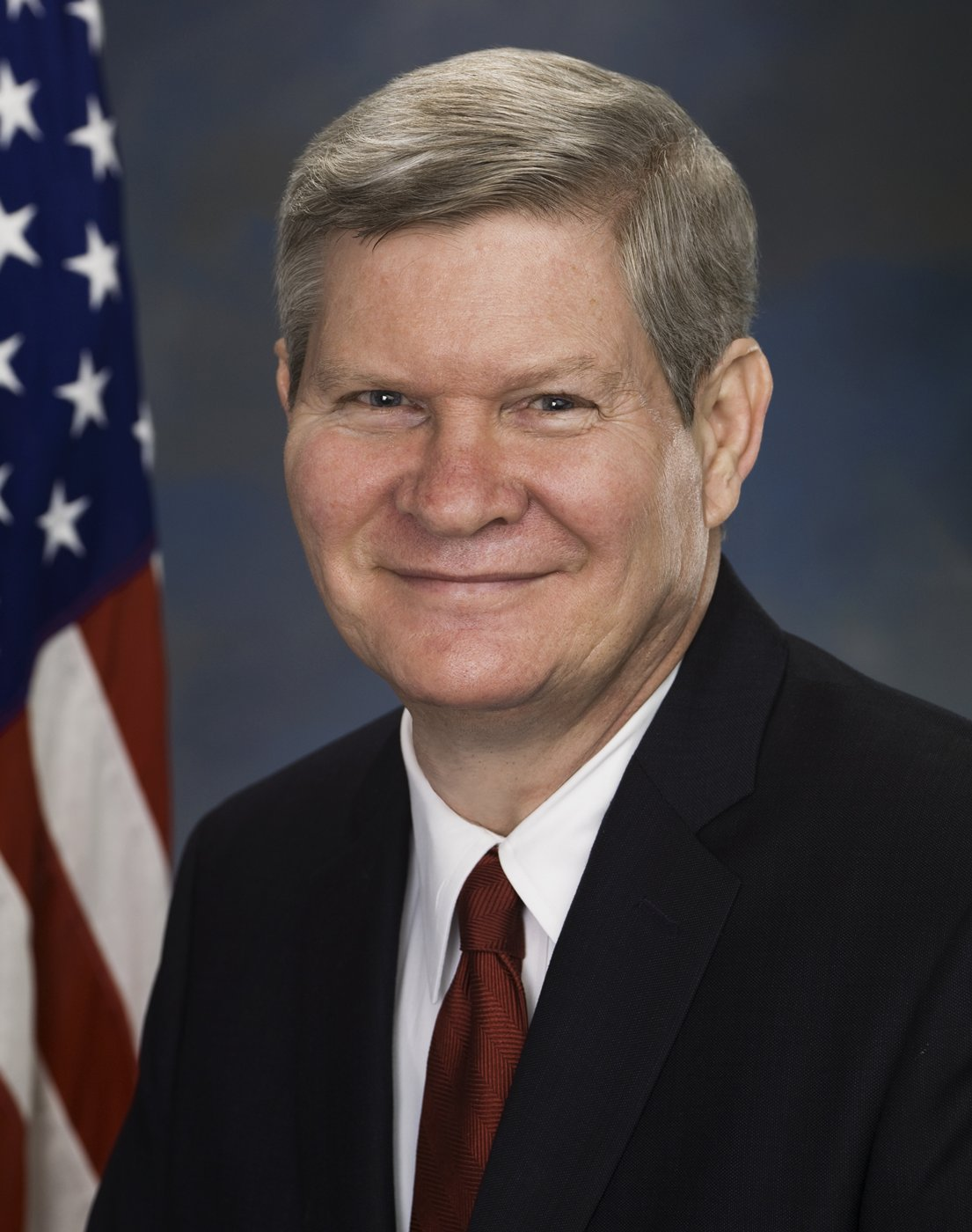

Nominee	Tim Johnson	Joel Dykstra
Party	Democratic	Republican
Popular vote	237,835	142,766
Percentage	62.49%	37.51%
- Johnson: 50–60% 60–70% 70–80% 80–90% >90% Dykstra: 50–60% 60–70% 70–80% 80–90% Tie: 50%
U.S. senator before election
Tim Johnson
Democratic
Elected U.S. Senator
Tim Johnson
Democratic

The 2008 United States Senate election in South Dakota was held on November 4, 2008. Primary elections were held on June 3, 2008. Incumbent Senator Tim Johnson won re-election to a third term. As of 2024, this election alongside the simultaneous House race is the last time a Democrat won a statewide election in South Dakota.

== Background ==
In 2002, Tim Johnson was re-elected by a narrow margin of 527 votes, the closest senate contest in the country that cycle. Two years later, Republicans flipped the state's other senate seat, ousting Senate Minority Leader Tom Daschle. Heading into 2008, the seat was poised to be a heavily contested one, and Republicans saw as a strong potential flip.

The race was upended on December 13, 2006, when Senator Johnson was hospitalized with what was later revealed to be a brain hemorrhage. This immediately shook up the state of the race, and dashed much of the discourse surrounding it for a time. On the Democratic side, there was uncertainty if Johnson would be able to return to the Senate, and speculation on whether Stephanie Herseth-Sandlin, the state's at-large congresswoman, would run in his place.

However, by all accounts, Johnson still intended to run for re-election as long as his health kept improving, and prominent Democrats such as Harry Reid and Ted Kennedy held fundraisers for Johnson. After a nine-month absence, Johnson returned to the Senate in August 2007, and was back to his duties as senator in September 2007. One month later, Johnson ended all speculation by announcing his bid for re-election.

== Republican primary ==
=== Candidates ===
- Joel Dykstra, South Dakota state representative
- Charles Gonyo
- Sam Kephart

=== Declined ===
- Dennis Daugaard, incumbent lieutenant governor since 2003
- Dusty Johnson, member of the South Dakota Public Utilities Commission
- Mike Rounds, incumbent governor since 2003

=== Campaign ===
Republican efforts for recruitment were frustrated by Johnson's situation and the sympathy boost that came with it. Significant hope was given to the possibility of recruiting second-term governor Mike Rounds to run against Johnson, but Rounds showed little interest. Lt. Governor Dennis Daugaard, who was wealthy and could self-fund, was also sought, but he was planning a gubernatorial bid for 2010. On July 5, 2007, Joel Dykstra, a state representative, entered, but he was seen as having long odds and as not a top-tier candidate.

=== Results ===
Republican primary results
Party	Candidate	Votes	%
Republican	Joel Dykstra	34,598	65.74%
Republican	Sam Kephart	13,047	24.79%
Republican	Charles Gonyo	4,983	9.47%
Total votes		52,628	100.00%

== General election ==
=== Candidates ===
- Joel Dykstra (R), South Dakota state representative
- Tim Johnson (D), incumbent U.S. senator

=== Campaign ===
Already a well-regarded figure, following health problems, Johnson became more popular. "South Dakota is a very kind state," Steve Jarding, a Harvard political scientist who ran Johnson's campaign, said. "People were rooting for Tim—Democrats, Republicans, independents—they wanted him to be O.K." He was also seen a pragmatic moderate. He received endorsements from the Republican Mayor of Sioux Falls, Dave Munson, and the NRA Political Victory Fund. Johnson also received the endorsement of former Senator Larry Pressler, whom Johnson beat in 1996.

Dykstra argued that Johnson voted 80% of the time with U.S. Senator Barack Obama and 90% with U.S. Senate Majority Leader Harry Reid. In response, Johnson pointed out his votes on the confirmation of U.S. Supreme Court justices John Roberts/Samuel Alito, against flag burning, in favor for the Iraq War, Patriot Act, and a ban on partial birth abortion.

Dykstra tried to turn the race around by comparing Johnson to Larry Pressler in 1996, and said that Dykstra would work better with the state's other senator. Dykstra also focused on high gas prices, highlighting his experience in the energy industry, and a focus on alternate energy sources. Johnson's popularity and sympathy proved to be the main factor, giving him a large amount of sympathy vote.

=== Predictions ===
Source	Ranking	As of
The Cook Political Report	Likely D	October 23, 2008
CQ Politics	Safe D	October 31, 2008
Rothenberg Political Report	Safe D	November 2, 2008
Real Clear Politics	Safe D	November 4, 2008

=== Polling ===
Poll source	Dates administered	Tim Johnson (D)	Joel Dykstra (R)
Rasmussen Reports	March 4, 2008	63%	28%
Rasmussen Reports	July 15, 2008	60%	38%

=== Results ===
While John McCain won the state comfortably, Johnson easily won re-election to a third term, losing in only four counties. His friend and fellow Democrat, Stephanie Herseth Sandlin, easily won re-election to South Dakota's at-large congressional district.

General election results
Party	Candidate	Votes	%	±%
Democratic	Tim Johnson (incumbent)	237,889	62.49%	+12.87%
Republican	Joel Dykstra	142,784	37.51%	−11.96%
Total votes		380,673	100.00%	N/A
Democratic hold				

==== Counties that flipped from Republican to Democratic ====
- Union (largest city: Dakota Dunes)
- Hutchinson (largest city: Parkston)
- Lincoln (largest city: Sioux Falls)
- Turner (largest city: Parker)
- Butte (largest city: Belle Fourche)
- Meade (largest city: Sturgis)
- Custer (largest city: Custer)
- Pennington (largest city: Rapid City)
- Lawrence (largest city: Spearfish)
- Fall River (largest city: Hot Springs)
- Stanley (largest city: Fort Pierre)
- Jackson (largest city: Kadoka)
- Potter (largest city: Gettysburg)
- Sully (largest city: Onida)
- Hughes (largest city: Pierre)
- Hyde (largest city: Highmore)
- Walworth (largest city: Mobridge)
- Campbell (largest city: Herreid)
- McPherson (largest city: Eureka)
- Tripp (largest city: Winner)
- Gregory (largest city: Gregory)
- Hamlin (largest city: Estelline)
- Davison (largest city: Mitchell)
- Douglas (largest city: Armour)
- Hanson (largest city: Alexandria)

== See also ==
- 2008 United States Senate elections
