= Kathy Tyler =

American politician

Member of the South Dakota House of Representatives from the 4th district
- Incumbent
- Assumed office January 11, 2013 Serving with Jim Peterson

Personal details
- Party: Democratic

Kathy Tyler is an American politician and a Democratic member of the South Dakota House of Representatives representing District 4 since January 11, 2013.

== Elections ==
- 2012 When District 4 incumbent Representative Republican Valentine Rausch was term limited and ran for South Dakota Senate and Democrat Steve Street was term limited and retired, leaving both District 4 seats open, James R. Peterson and Tyler were unopposed for the June 5, 2012 Democratic primary; in the four-way November 6, 2012 general election, Tyler took the first seat with 5,131 votes (26.71%) and fellow Democratic nominee Peterson took the second seat ahead of Republican nominees Fred Deutsch and James Gilkerson, who had run for the seat in 2008 and 2010.
