= Dylan C. Jordan =

American politician

Member of the South Dakota House of Representatives from the 4th district
- Incumbent
- Assumed office January 14, 2025 Serving with Kent Roe

Personal details
- Party: Republican
- Website: jordanforsd.com

Dylan C. Jordan is an American politician. He serves as a Republican member for the 4th district in the South Dakota House of Representatives since 2025. His district is located in the north-eastern part of the state and includes the cities of Milbank and Clark. His career has included manufacturing, delivery driver, and having a side DJ business.
