= Jason Kettwig =

American politician

Member of the South Dakota House of Representatives from the 4th district
- In office January 10, 2017 – January 8, 2019
- Preceded by: Fred Deutsch; John Wiik
- Succeeded by: Fred Deutsch

Personal details
- Born: Hazel, South Dakota
- Party: Republican

Jason Kettwig is an American politician who served in the South Dakota House of Representatives from the 4th district from 2017 to 2019.
