= Bob Faehn =

American politician (1958–2021)

Member of the South Dakota House of Representatives from the 5th district
- In office January 11, 2005 – January 11, 2011
- Preceded by: Burdette Solum; Claire Konold
- Succeeded by: Melissa Magstadt

Personal details
- Born: April 2, 1958 Minneapolis, Minnesota, U.S.
- Died: September 13, 2021 (aged 63) Watertown, South Dakota, U.S.
- Party: Republican

Bob Faehn (April 2, 1958 – September 13, 2021) was an American politician who served in the South Dakota House of Representatives from the 5th district from 2005 to 2011.

He died of cancer on September 13, 2021, in Watertown, South Dakota, at age 63.
