= Kent Roe =

American politician

Member of the South Dakota House of Representatives from the 4th district
- Incumbent
- Assumed office January 14, 2025 Serving with Dylan C. Jordan

Personal details
- Born: June 30, 1966 (age 60)
- Party: Republican
- Education: South Dakota State University
- Website: www.kentroeforhouse.com

Kent Roe (born June 30, 1966) is an American politician. He serves as a Republican member for the 4th district in the South Dakota House of Representatives since 2025. His district is located in the north-eastern part of the state and includes the cities of Milbank and Clark.
