= Roger Solum =

American politician

Member of the South Dakota House of Representatives from the 5th district
- In office January 2009 – January 2017 Serving with Bob Faehn (2009–2011); Melissa Magstadt (2011–present)
- Preceded by: Al Koistinen

Personal details
- Born: July 1, 1953 (age 73)
- Party: Republican

Roger D. Solum (born July 1, 1953) is an American politician and a former Republican member of the South Dakota House of Representatives representing District 5 since January 2009.

== Elections ==
- 2012 Solum and incumbent Representative Melissa Magstadt were unopposed for the June 5, 2012 Republican Primary and won the three-way November 6, 2012 General election where Representative Madstadt took the first seat and Solum took the second seat with 5,844 votes (39.4%) ahead of Democratic nominee Dorothy Kellogg.
- 2008 When District 5 incumbent Republican Representatives Al Koistinen ran for South Dakota Senate and left a District 5 seat open, Solum and incumbent Representative Bob Faehn were unopposed for the June 3, 2008 Republican Primary and won the four-way November 4, 2008 General election where Representative Faehn took the first seat and Solum took the second seat with 5,617 votes (31.2%) ahead of Democratic nominees Curt Johnson and Juanita Lentz.
- 2010 When incumbent Representative Faehn left the Legislature and left a District 5 seat open, Solum ran in the three-way June 8, 2010 Republican Primary and placed second with 1,062 votes (34.8%); in the three-way November 2, 2010 General election fellow Republican nominee Melissa Madstadt took the first seat and Solum took the second seat with 4,514 votes (34.23%) ahead of Democratic nominee Jeff Dunn.
