= Woodlawn Cemetery (Sioux Falls, South Dakota) =

Public cemetery in Sioux Falls, South Dakota

- Interactive map of Woodlawn Cemetery

Details
- Established: 1905; 121 years ago
- Location: 2001 South Cliff Avenue; Sioux Falls, South Dakota
- Country: United States
- Coordinates: 43°31′32.8757″N 96°42′47.8894″W
- No. of interments: 16,600 (2015)
- Website: Official website
- Find a Grave: Woodlawn Cemetery

Woodlawn Cemetery is a public cemetery in Sioux Falls, South Dakota. It was established in 1905 by Richard F. Pettigrew. Several notable people are buried in the cemetery, including Pettigrew and two former governors of South Dakota.

== History ==
U.S. Representative for South Dakota Richard F. Pettigrew first announced plans for the cemetery in 1903. He paid $8,750 for 70 acres (28 ha) near an area known as Hunter's Grove, now located at the corners of 26th Street and Cliff Avenue. The cemetery was officially established in 1905. In March 1906, Mary Frantz became the first person to be buried in the cemetery.

By 2015, Woodlawn Cemetery had a recorded 16,600 burials and estimated it had space for 14,000–15,000 additional interments.

== Notable burials ==
- Nils Boe (1913–1992), 23rd Governor of South Dakota
- Charles A. Christopherson (1871–1951), U.S. Representative for South Dakota
- George Jonathan Danforth (1875–1951), South Dakota Senator
- Tim Johnson (1946–2024), U.S. Senator and Congressman
- George T. Mickelson (1903–1965), 16th Attorney General and 18th Governor of South Dakota
- Belle L. Pettigrew (1839–1912), educator and missionary
- Richard F. Pettigrew (1848–1926), U.S. Representative and Senator for Dakota Territory and South Dakota
- Joan Tabor (1932–1968), actress
