= Tim Johnson (South Dakota politician) =

American politician (1946–2024)

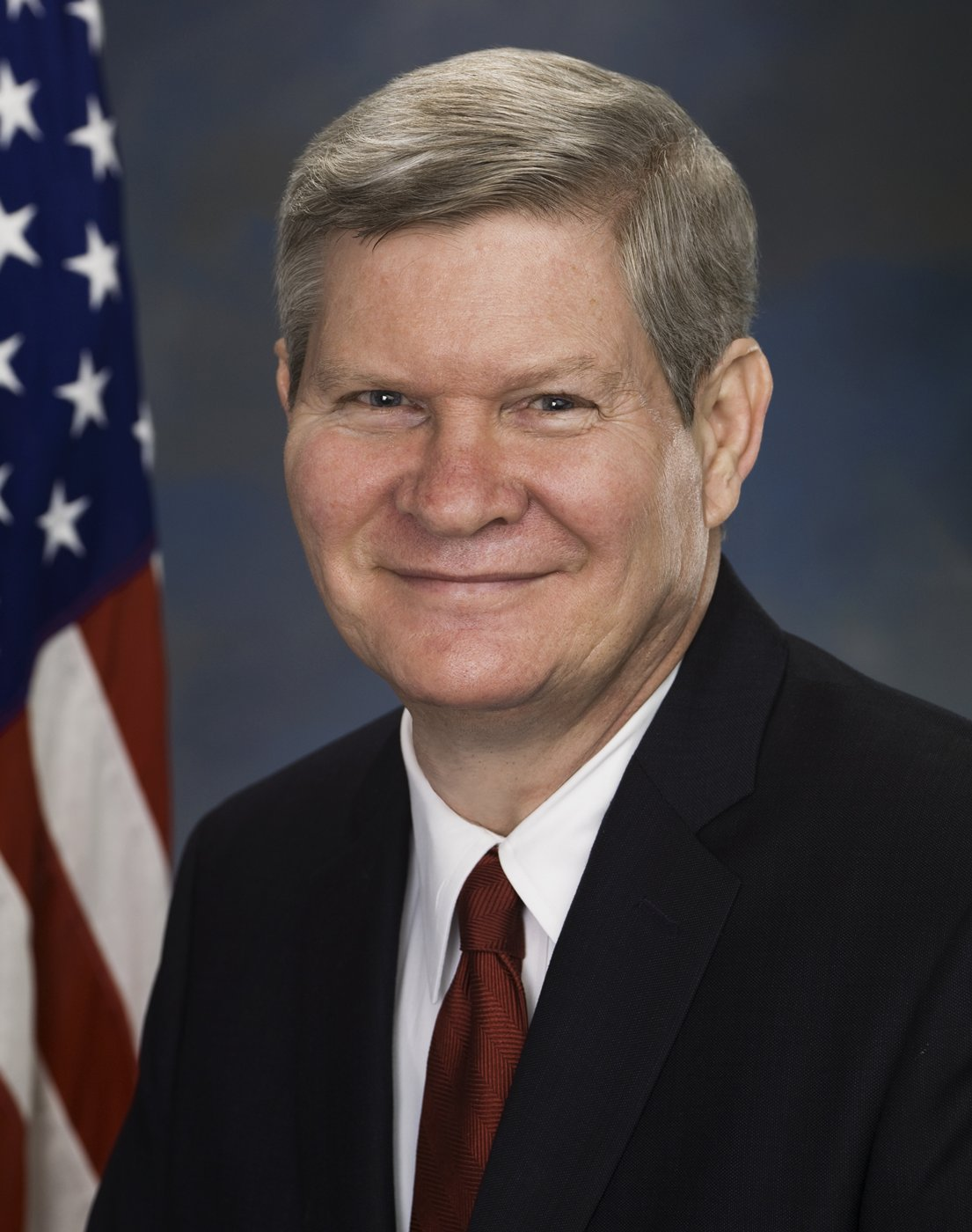
- Official portrait, 2009

United States Senator from South Dakota
- In office January 3, 1997 – January 3, 2015
- Preceded by: Larry Pressler
- Succeeded by: Mike Rounds

Chair of the Senate Banking Committee
- In office January 3, 2011 – January 3, 2015
- Preceded by: Chris Dodd
- Succeeded by: Richard Shelby

Member of the U.S. House of Representatives from South Dakota's at-large district
- In office January 3, 1987 – January 3, 1997
- Preceded by: Tom Daschle
- Succeeded by: John Thune

Member of the South Dakota Senate
- In office January 1983 – January 1987
- Preceded by: George H. Shanard
- Succeeded by: Roland A. Chicoine

Member of the South Dakota House of Representatives
- In office January 1979 – January 1983

Personal details
- Born: Timothy Peter Johnson; December 28, 1946 Canton, South Dakota, U.S.
- Died: October 8, 2024 (aged 77) Sioux Falls, South Dakota, U.S.
- Resting place: Woodlawn Cemetery; Sioux Falls, South Dakota
- Party: Democratic
- Spouse: Barbara Brooks (m. 1969)
- Children: 3, including Brendan
- Education: University of South Dakota (BA, MA, JD)
- Johnson's voice Johnson speaks on data security at a Senate Banking Committee hearing Recorded March 10, 2005

Timothy Peter Johnson (December 28, 1946 – October 8, 2024) was an American lawyer and politician who served as a United States senator from South Dakota from 1997 to 2015. A member of the Democratic Party, he served as the United States representative for South Dakota's at-large congressional district from 1987 to 1997 and in the South Dakota Legislature from 1979 to 1987. Johnson is the last Democrat to hold statewide and/or congressional office in South Dakota. He and Stephanie Herseth Sandlin are also the last Democrats to win a statewide election in South Dakota.

== Early life, education, and legal career ==
Johnson was born in Canton, South Dakota, the son of Ruth Jorinda (née Ljostveit), a homemaker, and Vandel Charles Johnson, an educator. He had Norwegian, Swedish, and Danish ancestry. Raised in Vermillion, Johnson earned a Bachelor of Arts in 1969 and a Master of Arts in 1970, both in political science, from the University of South Dakota, where he was a member of the Delta Tau Delta fraternity.

After doing post-graduate studies at Michigan State University from 1970 to 1971, a period during which he worked for the Michigan Senate, Johnson returned to Vermillion to attend the University of South Dakota School of Law and earned his Juris Doctor in 1975; he went into private practice immediately thereafter. He did not take the bar exam, as he was admitted to the South Dakota bar under the state's diploma privilege.

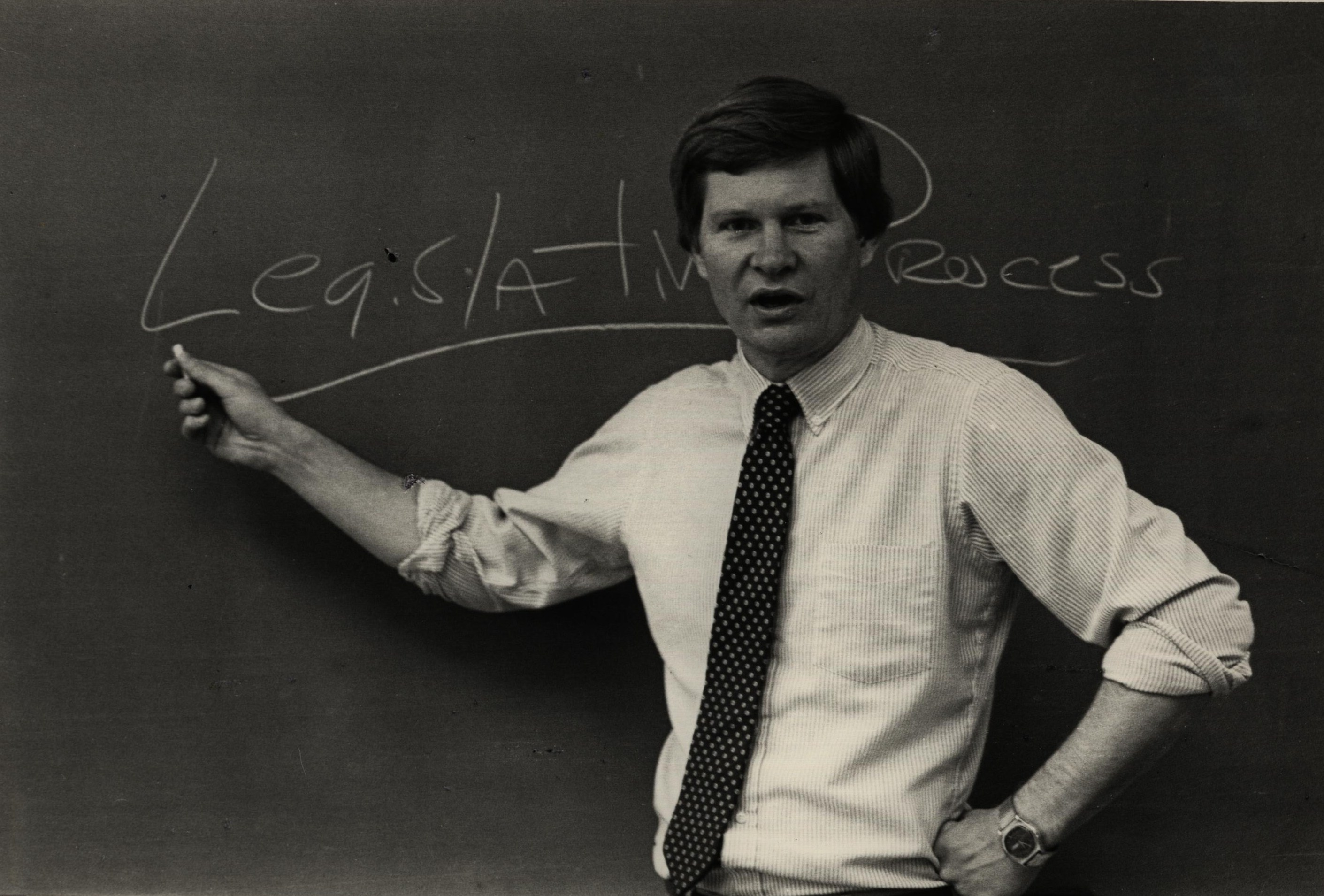
Johnson teaching a college class on the legislative process

== Early political career ==
Johnson served in the South Dakota House of Representatives from 1979 to 1982 and in the South Dakota Senate from 1983 to 1986. He served as Clay County deputy state's attorney in 1985 during his tenure in the South Dakota Senate. He was elected to the United States House of Representatives in 1986. During his first term, he introduced more legislation than any other freshman member of the House. Between 1991 and 1994, he served as a regional whip for the Democratic Party. He left the House in 1997, when his Senate tenure began.

== United States Senate ==
Johnson's Senate career began in 1997.

In December 2006, Johnson suffered a brain hemorrhage. His condition was viewed with much suspense; Democrats held a one-seat Senate majority, and had Johnson died or resigned, Governor Mike Rounds would likely have appointed a Republican to Johnson's seat, giving Republicans control of the Senate. Johnson returned to his full Senate schedule on September 5, 2007, to both tributes and standing ovations.

Johnson did not seek reelection in 2014.

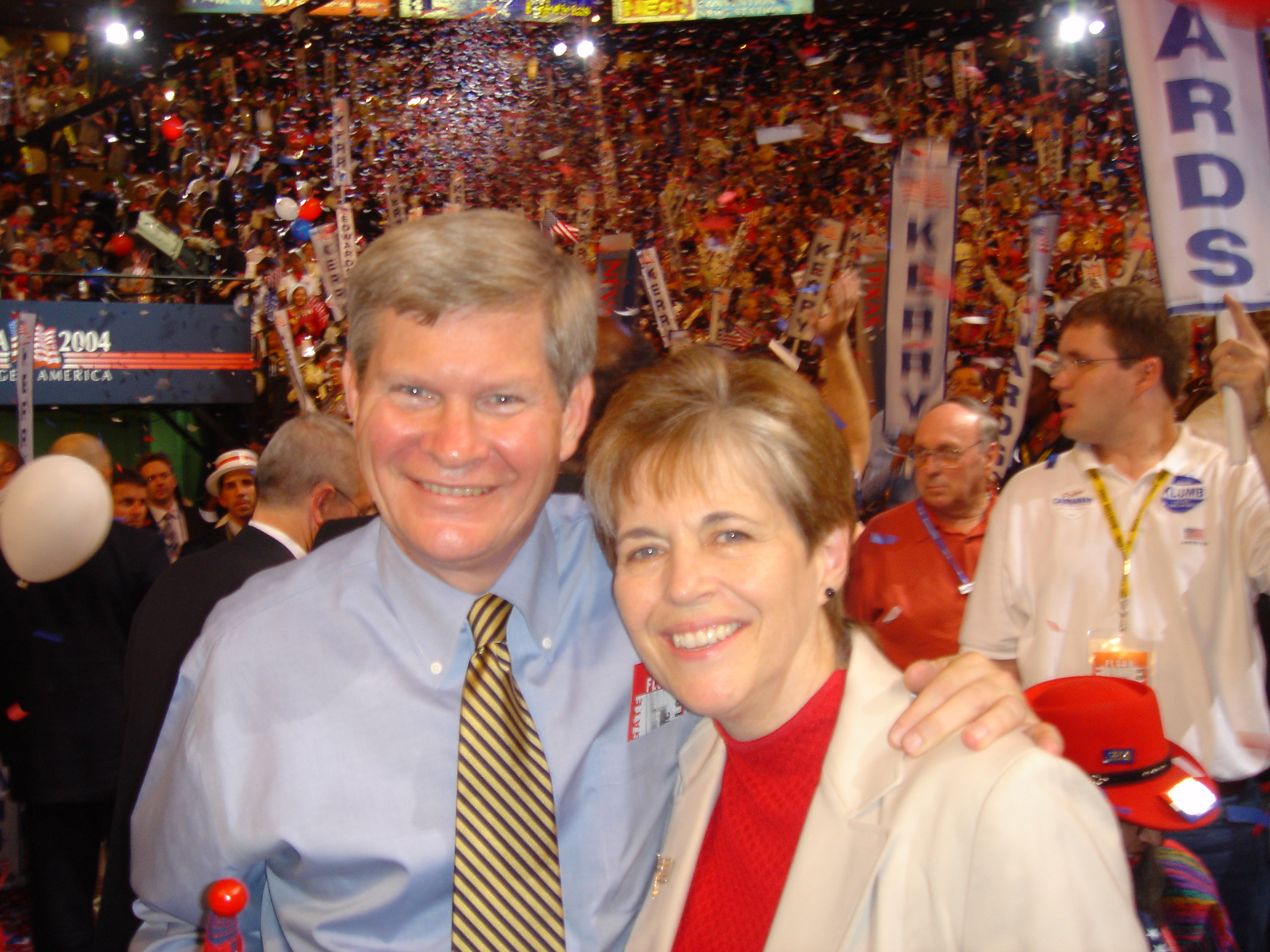
Johnson and Barbara at the 2004 Democratic National Convention

=== Committee assignments ===
- Committee on Appropriations
  - Subcommittee on Agriculture, Rural Development, Food and Drug Administration, and Related Agencies
  - Subcommittee on Energy and Water Development
  - Subcommittee on Interior, Environment, and Related Agencies
  - Subcommittee on Military Construction and Veterans' Affairs, and Related Agencies (Chairman)
  - Subcommittee on State, Foreign Operations, and Related Programs
  - Subcommittee on Transportation, Housing and Urban Development, and Related Agencies
- Committee on Banking, Housing, and Urban Affairs (chairman)
  - Subcommittee on Housing, Transportation, and Community Development
  - Subcommittee on Financial Institutions
  - Subcommittee on Securities, Insurance and Investment
- Committee on Energy and Natural Resources
  - Subcommittee on Public Lands and Forests
  - Subcommittee on Water and Power
- Committee on Indian Affairs

== Political positions ==
Johnson was considered a moderate Democrat.

=== Infrastructure ===
During his tenure in Congress, Johnson supported infrastructure projects that delivered clean drinking water to communities throughout South Dakota and into surrounding states. He authored several water project bills, resulting in clean drinking water being delivered to hundreds of thousands of South Dakota families.

During his first term in the House of Representatives, Johnson authored the Mni Wiconi Project Act of 1988. The measure authorized construction of a water project serving an area of southwestern South Dakota that included the Pine Ridge Indian Reservation, an area that had long suffered low water supplies and poor water quality. In subsequent years, Johnson authored and enacted legislation to expand the Mni Wiconi Rural Water Project service area.

Johnson's Mid Dakota Rural Water System Act of 1991 was enacted, and the project was completed in 2006 and serves more than 30,000 residents of east-central South Dakota.

The Fall River Rural Water Users District Rural Water System Act of 1998 authorized the Bureau of Reclamation to construct a rural water system in Fall River County. After years of drought, residents in the southeastern area of that county had been left without a suitable water supply, and many of them were forced to either haul water or use bottled water because of poor water quality.

The Lewis and Clark Rural Water System Act of 1999 authorized construction of a water delivery system spanning a broad area of southeastern South Dakota, northwestern Iowa, and southwestern Minnesota. The system joined 22 rural water systems and communities. The project was intended to bring clean, safe drinking water to 180,000 people in the Lewis and Clark service region. The Perkins County Rural Water System Act authorized the Bureau of Reclamation to construct a rural water system in Perkins County.

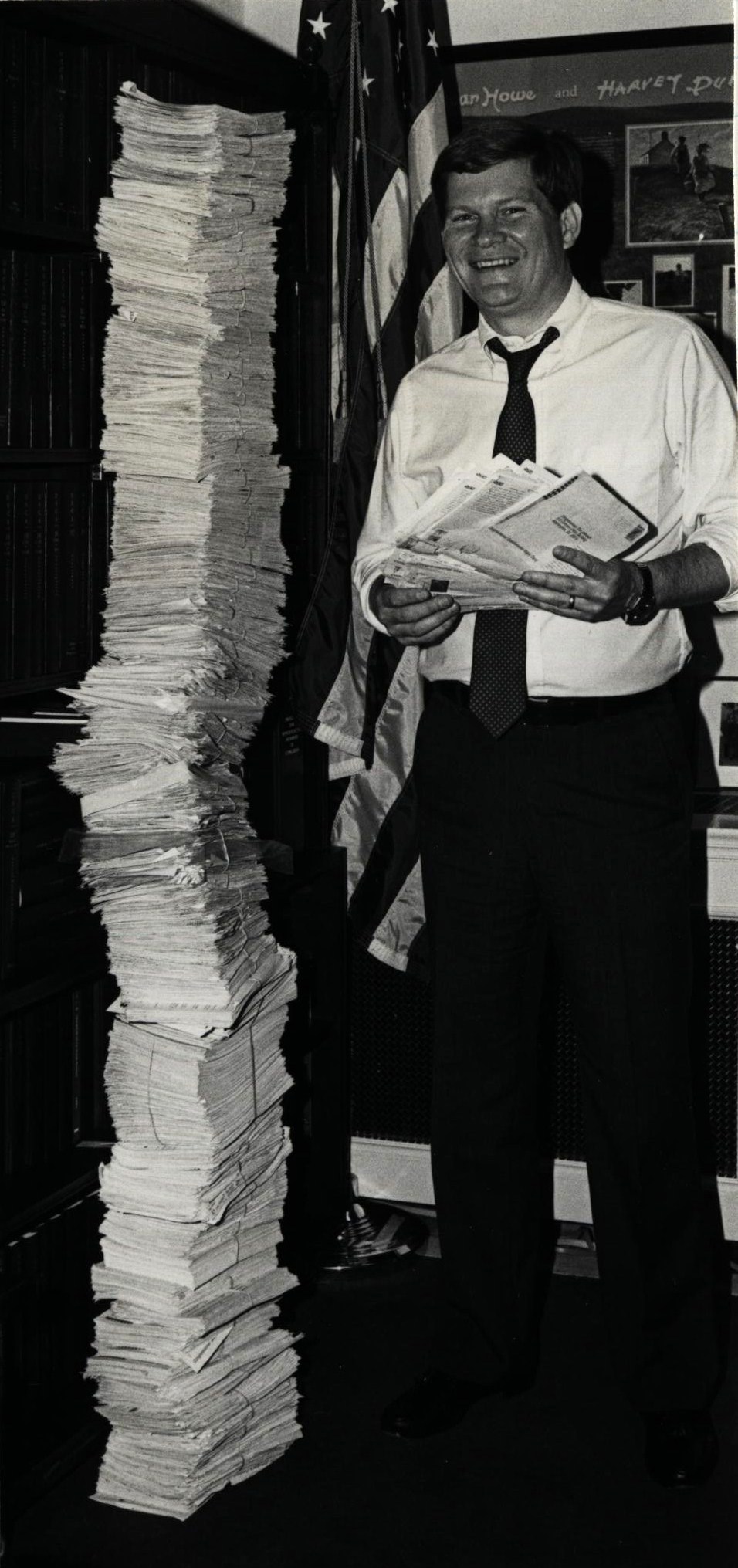
Johnson next to a stack of constituent mail

=== Agriculture ===
Johnson worked to enact a requirement that meat and other agricultural products be labeled for country of origin. Having first authored legislation addressing the issue in 1992, Johnson continued the fight until a meat labeling law was enacted in 2002 as part of the Farm Bill reauthorization. The enacted law contained language Johnson had introduced earlier that session.

For more than a decade, executive branch opposition and legal challenges delayed implementation of the labeling law.

In May 2007, Johnson received an Honored Cooperator award from the National Cooperative Business Association for his support of cooperative businesses.

In 2013, the National Farmers Union presented Johnson with its Friend of the Family Farmer award, an honor intended to recognize his commitment to helping small scale family farms remain viable.

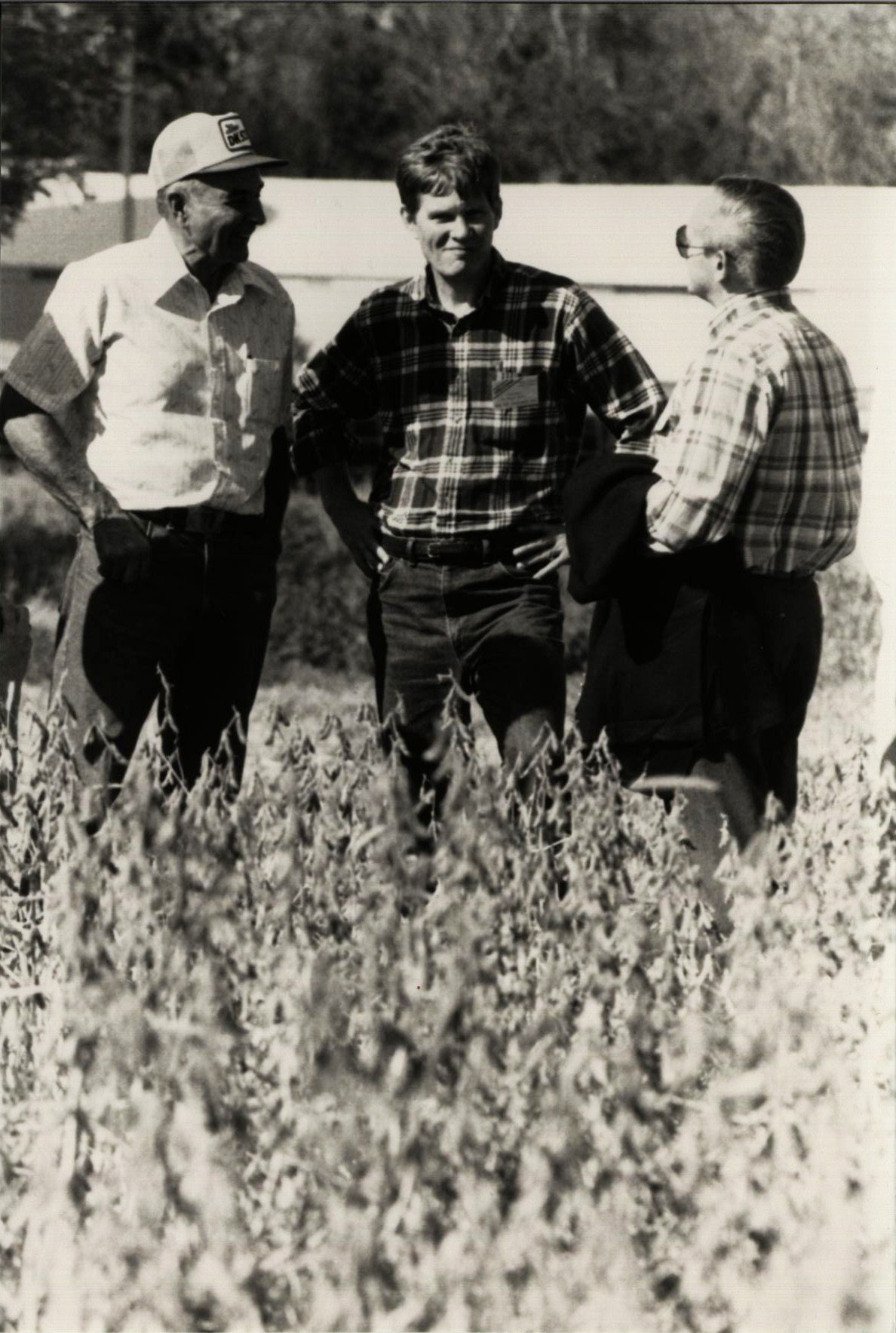
Johnson with farmers

=== Tourism ===
Johnson introduced a bill establishing the Minuteman Missile National Historic Site in western South Dakota. At the Minuteman Missile National Historic Site, visitors can learn about the Cold War and the nuclear missiles that threatened massive destruction while also serving as a deterrent to war.

=== Defense ===
Johnson was the only seated member of Congress to have a son or daughter serving in the active duty military when the Senate voted to approve the use of force in Iraq. His oldest son, Brooks, served in the Army's 101st Airborne Division, which would surely be mobilized to fight in Iraq. Johnson ultimately voted to permit the use of force, and his son served in Iraq, having already served in other conflicts in Bosnia and Kosovo. Brooks also served in the conflict in Afghanistan.

As chairman of the Senate Appropriations Subcommittee on Military Construction and Veterans Affairs, Johnson secured full and timely funding for veterans' health care for the first time in 21 years. He was among a group of legislators that successfully pressed for enactment of legislation providing advance funding for veterans' health care.

When the Base Realignment and Closure Commission recommended closure of Ellsworth Air Force Base, Johnson assisted in making the South Dakota delegation's case to keep the base open. The base was preserved by an 8–1 vote.

=== Banking ===
As chairman of the Senate Banking Committee, Johnson pressed for confirmation and brought Obama's nominee for Consumer Financial Protection Bureau chairman, Richard Cordray, to a committee vote despite Republican opposition.

The committee approved Cordray's nomination on a party-line 12–10 vote, and was confirmed by the Senate by a 66–34 vote.

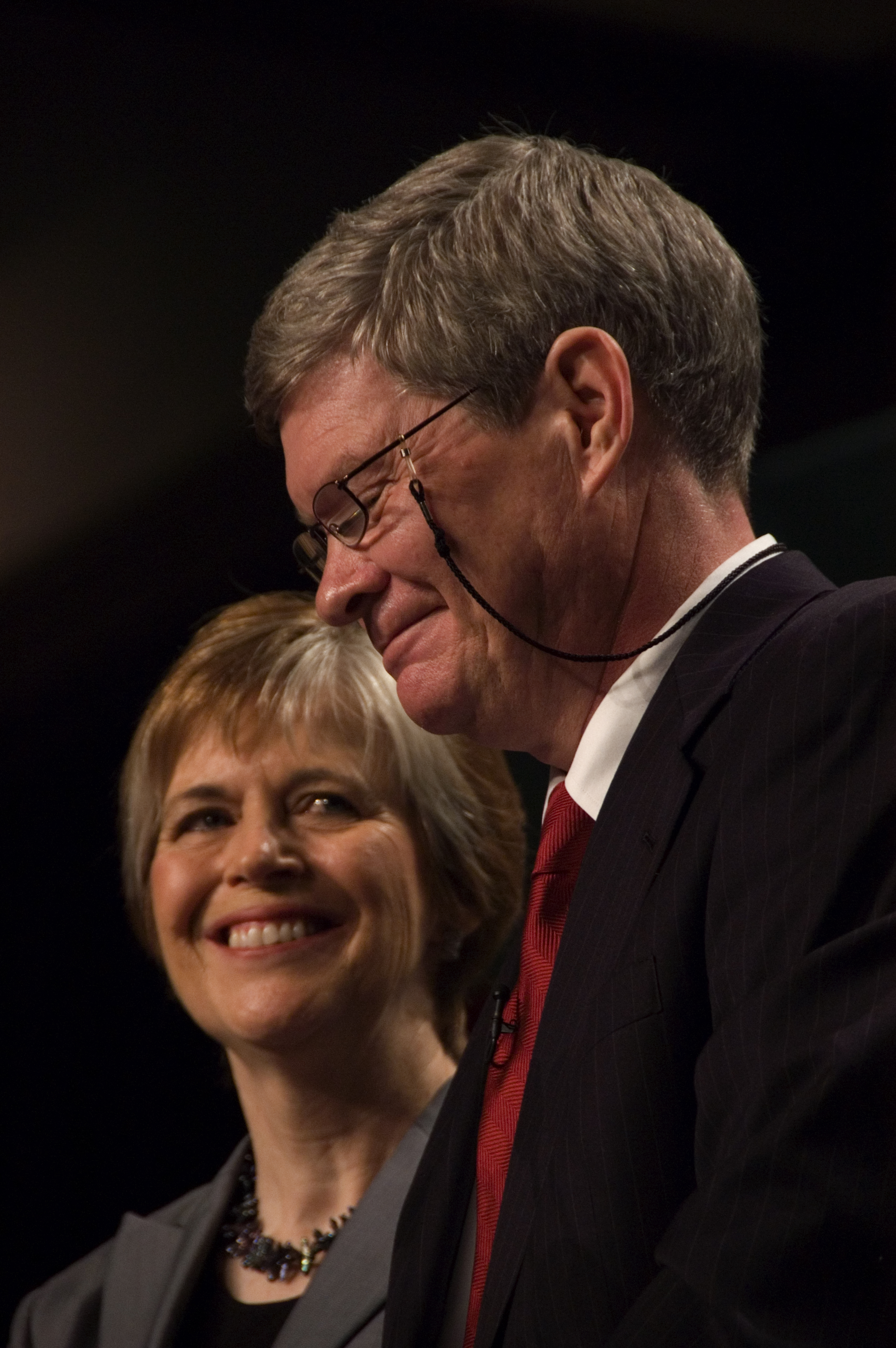
Johnson at the Sioux Falls Convention Center in 2007

=== Other ===
In the House, Johnson was among the minority of his party to vote in favor of the Personal Responsibility and Work Opportunity Reconciliation Act, a welfare reform bill and a bill to repeal the Federal Assault Weapons Ban. He was among the minority of Democrats to vote for President George W. Bush's 2001 tax cut. On January 31, 2006, Johnson was one of only four Democrats to vote to confirm Samuel Alito to the United States Supreme Court. He also called for "broadened use" of the death penalty.

Johnson was among the minority of senators to vote against the Unborn Victims of Violence Act, which anti-abortion groups strongly supported. While a member of the House, he was one of only 16 members of Congress to vote against the Telecom Act of 1996, which provided for deregulation and competition in the communication sector and was supported by Republicans, business groups, and most Democrats.

Johnson supported Obama's health reform legislation. He voted for the Patient Protection and Affordable Care Act in December 2009 and for the Health Care and Education Reconciliation Act of 2010.

In May 2010, Johnson introduced the Tony Dean Cheyenne River Valley Conservation Act, a bill that would designate over 48,000 acres (190 km^{2}) of the Buffalo Gap National Grassland as protected wilderness. The act would allow the continuation of grazing and hunting on the land and would create the first national grassland wilderness in the country.

On December 18, 2010, Johnson voted in favor of the Don't Ask, Don't Tell Repeal Act of 2010.

== Political campaigns ==
=== South Dakota legislature ===
Johnson launched his political career in 1978, winning a seat in the South Dakota House of Representatives. He served in the House from 1979 until 1982. Johnson continued his legislative career by serving in the South Dakota Senate from 1983 to 1986. During this time, he also worked as Clay County deputy state's attorney in 1985.

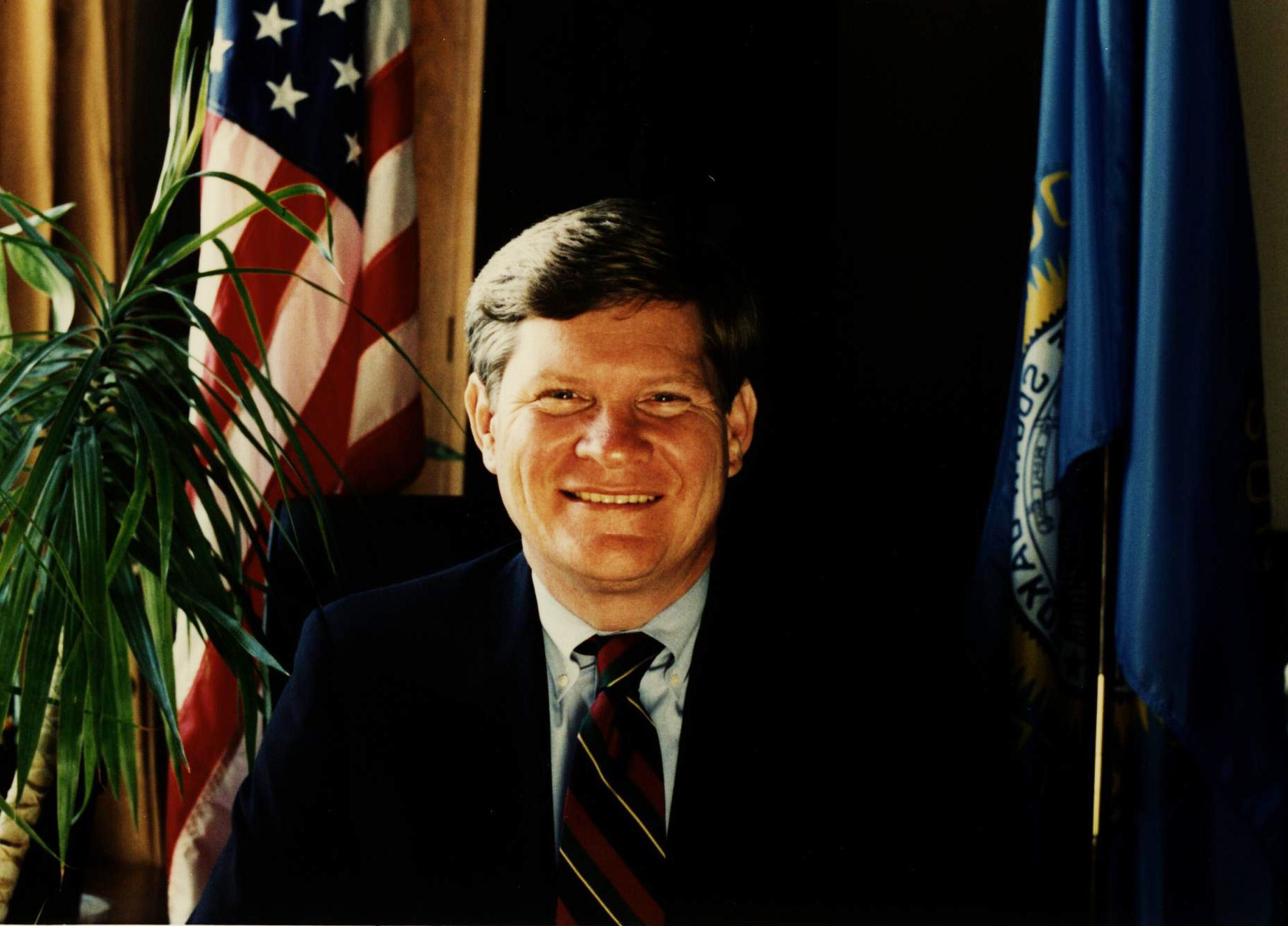
Official Congressional portrait, 1995

=== U.S. House of Representatives ===
Johnson was elected five times to represent South Dakota as the at-large member of the United States House of Representatives. He served from 1987 to 1997. During his tenure, Johnson worked on issues including agriculture, rural development, protecting Medicare and Social Security, and expanding access to healthcare.

=== 1996 U.S. Senate campaign ===
Johnson narrowly defeated three-term Senator Larry Pressler in the 1996 U.S. Senate election. This made him the only Senate candidate that year to defeat an incumbent in a general election, during a year that saw 13 open seats.

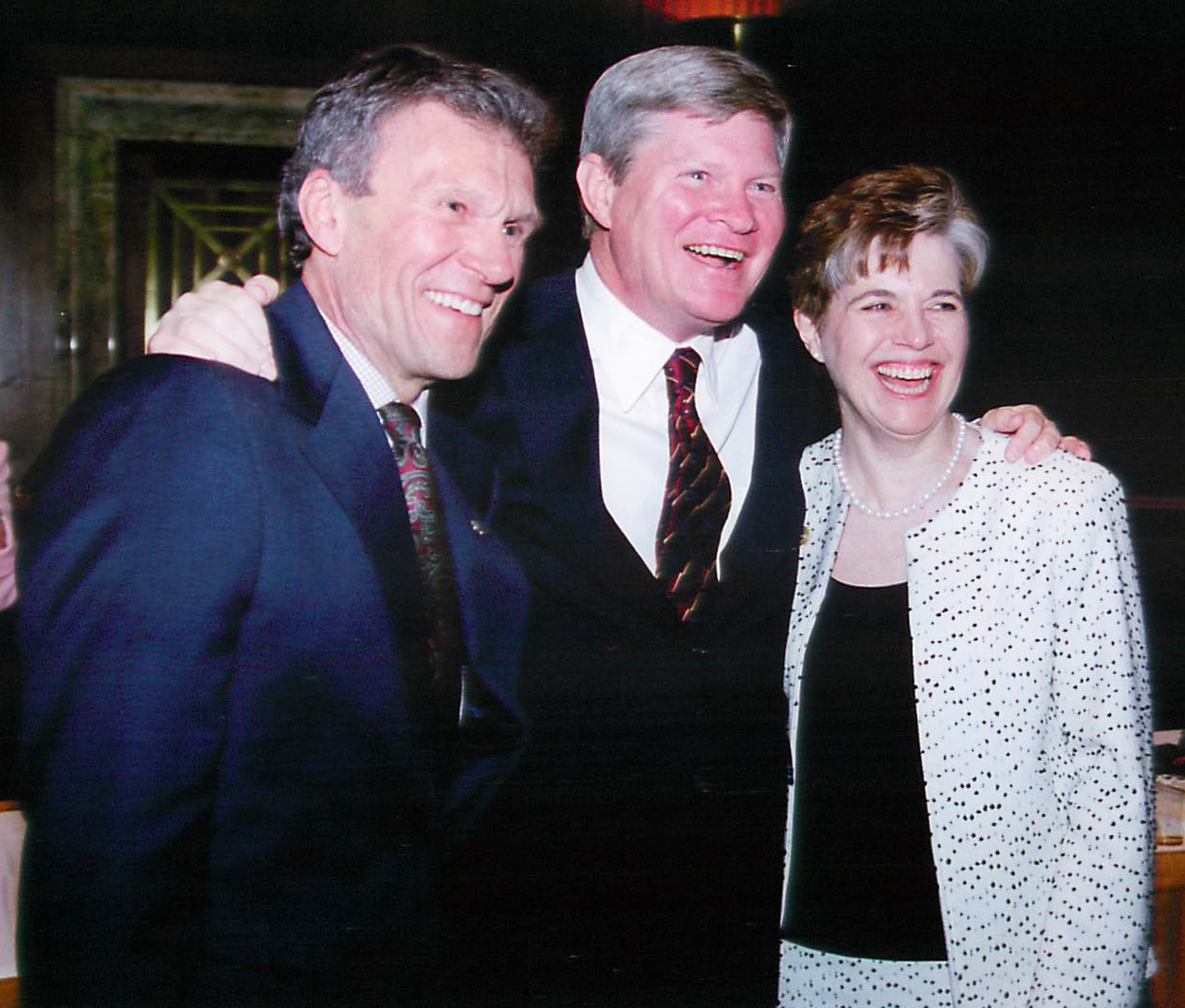
Johnson, Barbara, and Tom Daschle in the U.S. Capitol, 1997

=== 2002 U.S. Senate reelection campaign ===
In 2002, Johnson was reelected by 524 votes over John Thune, who had succeeded him in South Dakota's at-large congressional district. The race was widely seen as a proxy battle between George W. Bush, who won South Dakota comfortably in 2000, and Senate Majority Leader Tom Daschle. Johnson won 94% of the vote among the Oglala.

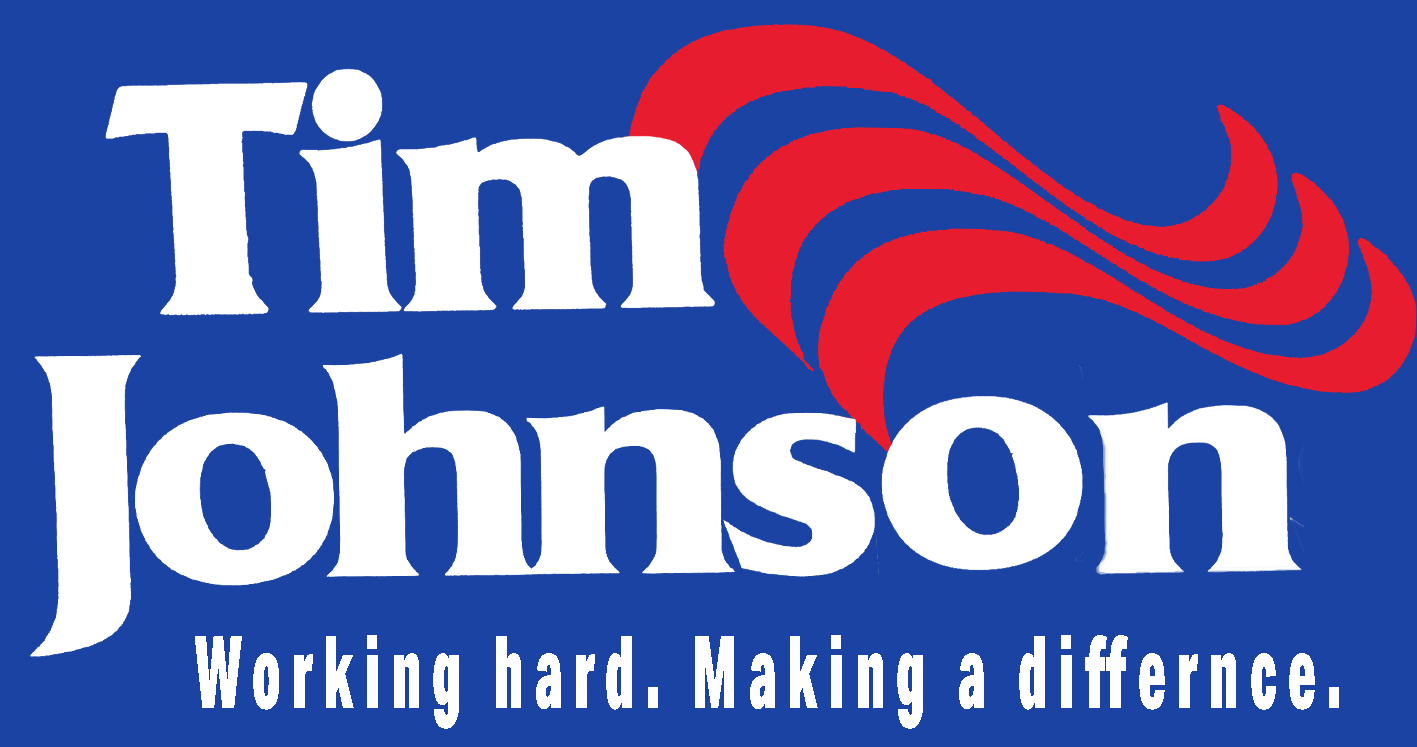
2002 Senate campaign logo

=== 2008 U.S. Senate reelection campaign ===
Johnson sought reelection in 2008 after recovering from a serious health condition. Early polls showed him likely to defeat Republican challenger Joel Dykstra, and he did, with 62.5% of the vote. In January 2008, Johnson endorsed Barack Obama for president in the Democratic primary.

== Electoral history ==
South Dakota's at-large congressional district: Results 1986–1994
Year	Democratic	Votes	Pct	Republican	Votes	Pct	3rd party	Party	Votes	Pct	3rd party	Party	Votes	Pct
1986	Tim Johnson	171,462	59.2%	Dale Bell	118,261	40.8%								
1988	Tim Johnson (incumbent)	223,759	71.7%	David Volk	88,157	28.3%								
1990	Tim Johnson (incumbent)	173,814	67.6%	Don Frankenfeld	83,484	32.4%								
1992	Tim Johnson (incumbent)	230,070	69.1%	John Timmer	89,375	26.9%	Ronald Wieczorek	Independent	6,746	2.0%	Robert J. Newland	Libertarian	3,931	1.2%
1994	Tim Johnson (incumbent)	183,036	59.8%	Jan Berkhout	112,054	36.6%	Ronald Wieczorek	Independent	10,832	3.5%				

*Write-in and minor candidate notes: In 1992, Ann Balakier received 2,780 votes.

South Dakota Senator (Class II): Results 1996–2008
Year	Democratic	Votes	Pct	Republican	Votes	Pct	3rd party	Party	Votes	Pct
1996	Tim Johnson	166,533	51.32%	Larry Pressler (incumbent)	157,954	48.68%				
2002	Tim Johnson (incumbent)	167,481	49.62%	John Thune	166,949	49.47%	Kurt Evans	Libertarian	3,071	0.91%
2008	Tim Johnson (incumbent)	237,866	62.49%	Joel Dykstra	142,778	37.51%				

== Personal life ==
Johnson married the former Barbara Brooks in 1969. The couple had three children: Brooks, Brendan, and Kelsey.

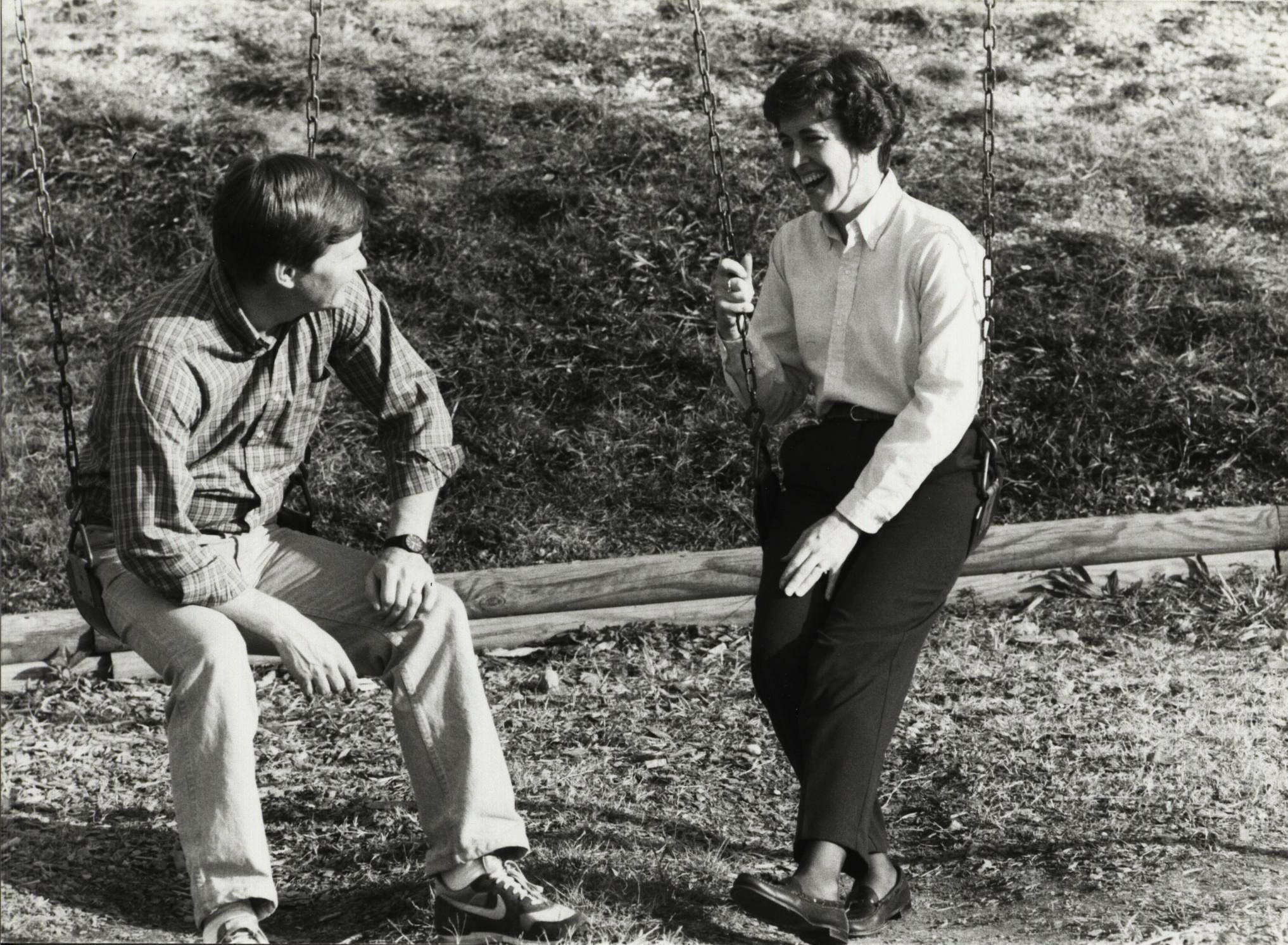
Johnson and Barbara, 1986 campaign photo

=== Illness and death ===
Johnson was treated for prostate cancer in 2004 and further tests showed he was clear of the disease.

On December 13, 2006, during the broadcast of a live radio interview, Johnson suffered bleeding in the brain caused by a cerebral arteriovenous malformation, a congenital defect that causes enlarged and tangled blood vessels. In critical condition, he underwent surgery at George Washington University Hospital to drain the blood and stop further bleeding.

Johnson then underwent a lengthy regimen of physical, occupational, and speech therapy to regain strength and mobility and restore his severely affected speech. He was left partially paralyzed on his right side, and had to use a scooter. In his 2007 State of the Union Address, President George W. Bush sent Johnson his best wishes. Johnson resumed his full schedule in the Senate on September 5, 2007.

Johnson died on October 8, 2024, at age 77, in Sioux Falls after having another stroke. His funeral service on October 18 at Our Savior's Lutheran Church in Sioux Falls was attended by hundreds of people, including several politicians who had served with Johnson. He was buried at Woodlawn Cemetery.

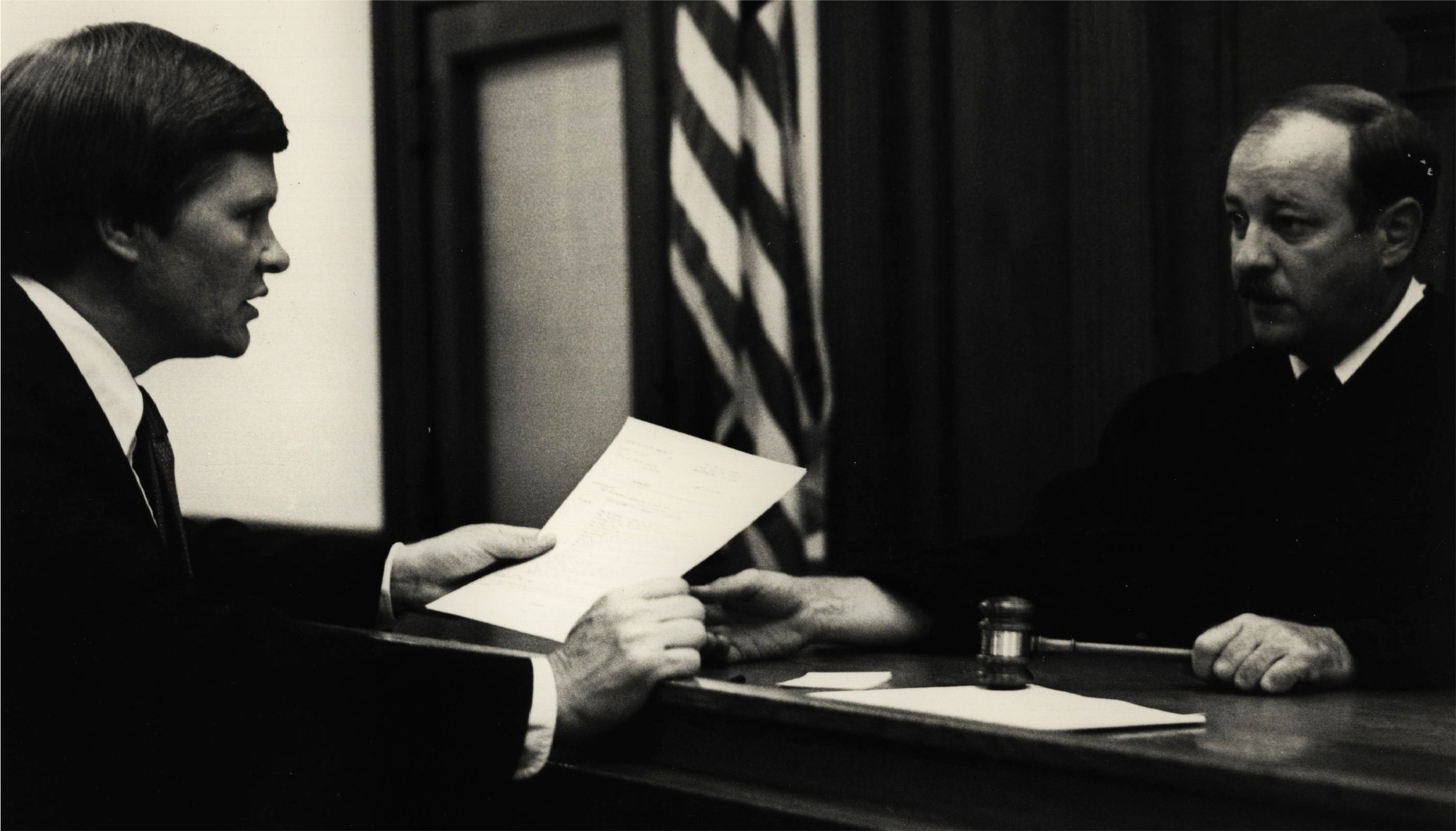
Johnson when he was Clay County assistant state's attorney in Vermillion

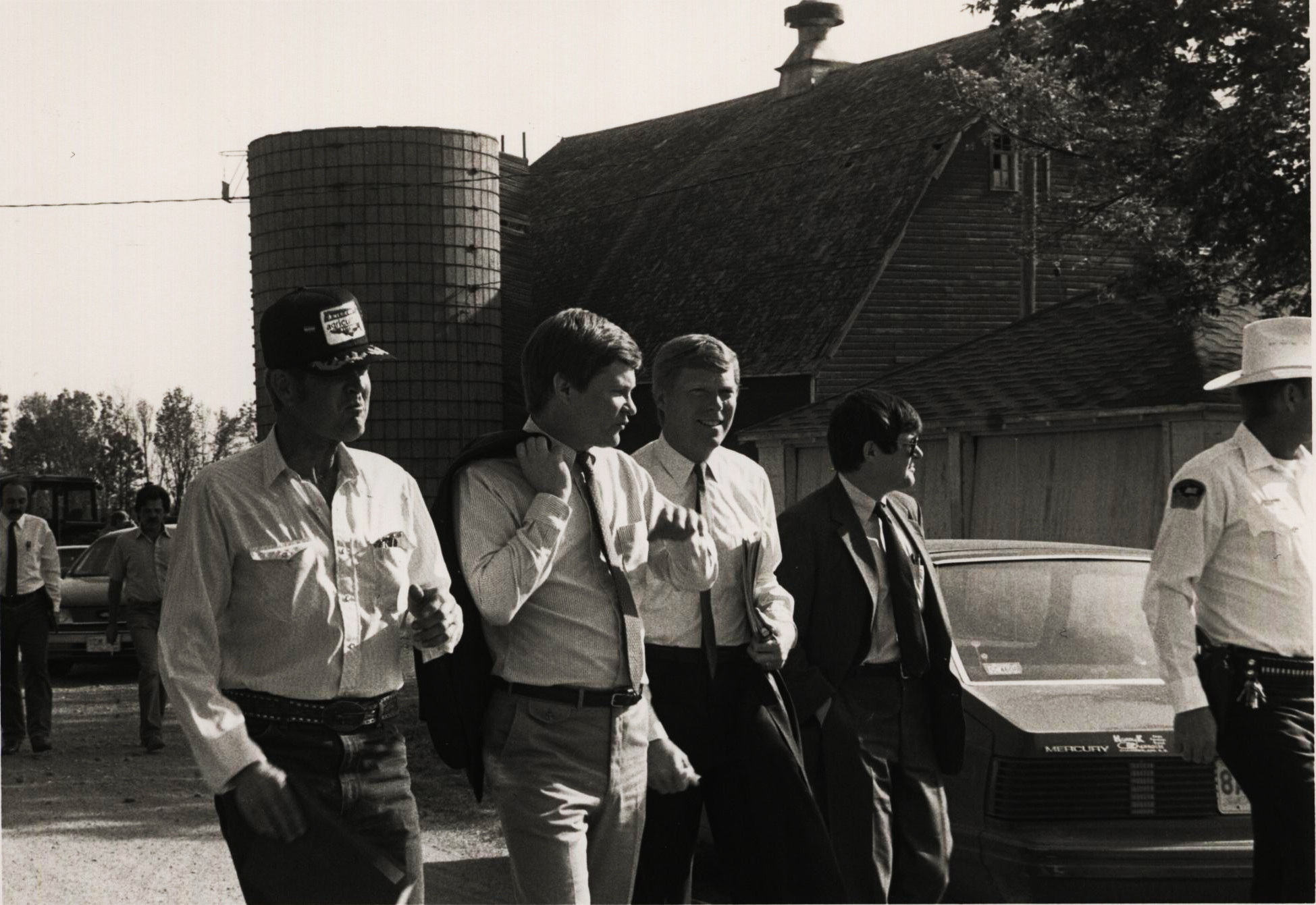
Johnson with South Dakota farmers and Dick Gephardt

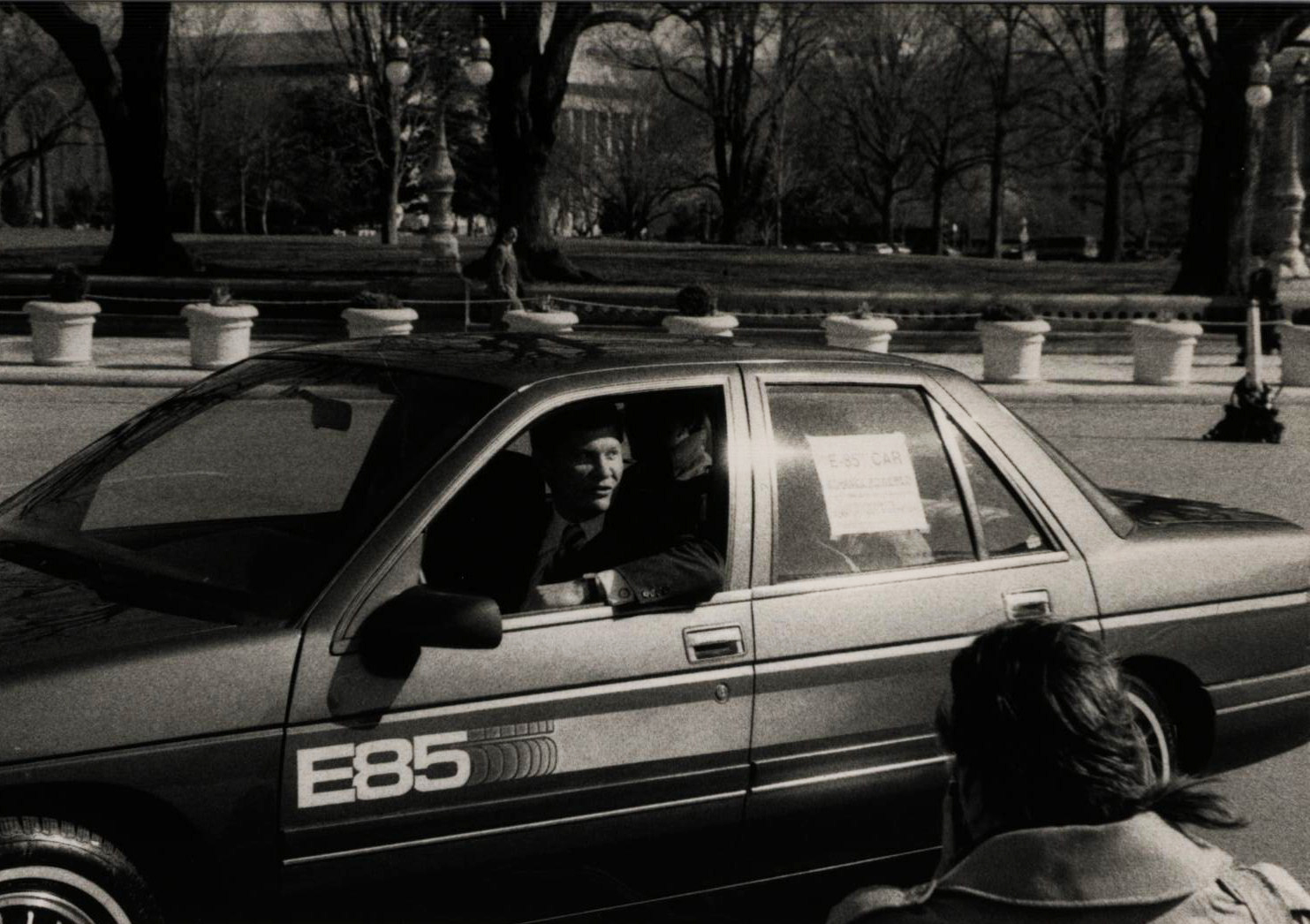
Johnson driving an ethanol-powered vehicle at the U.S. Capitol

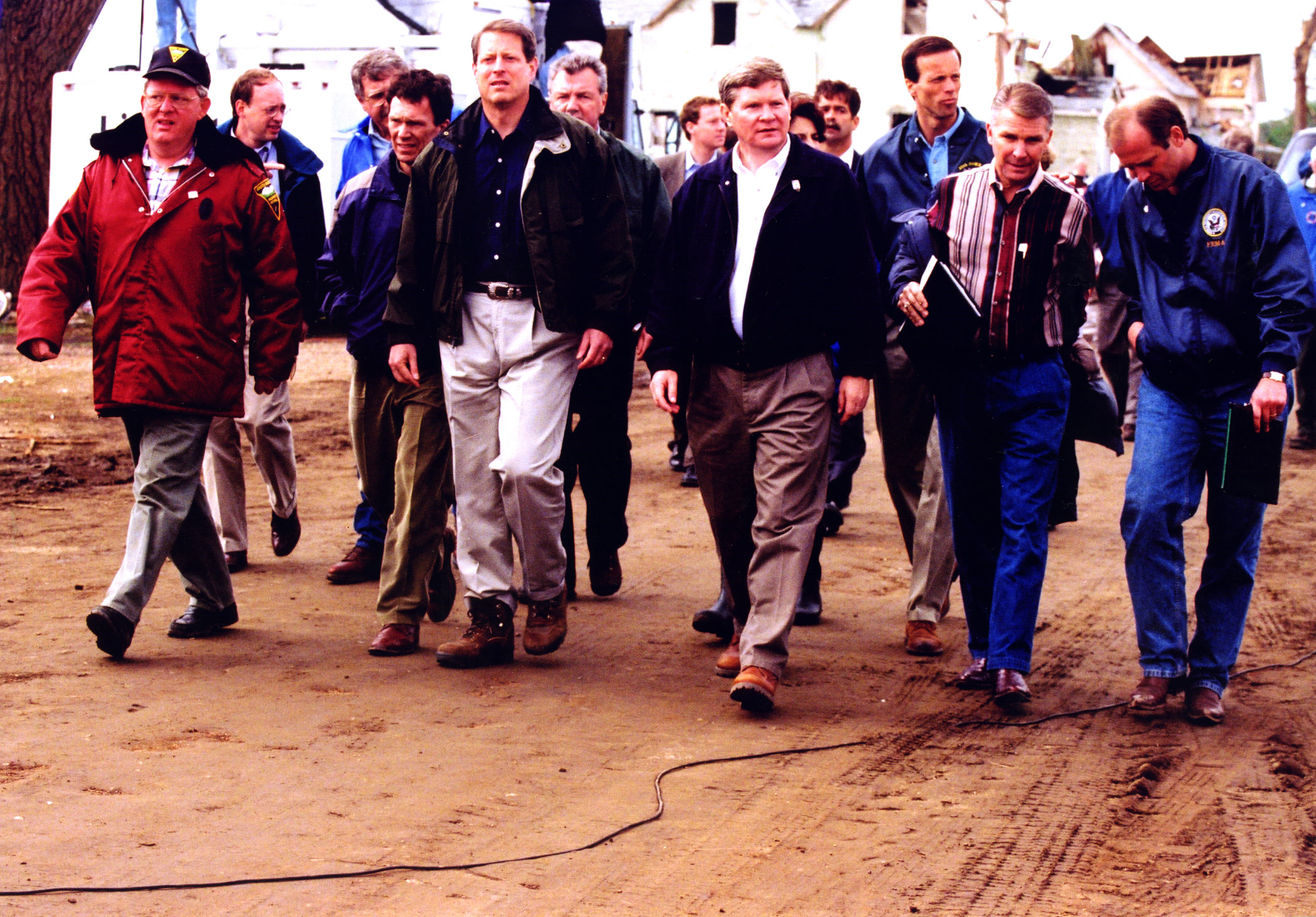
Johnson surveying tornado damage in Spencer in 1998, with John Thune, Bill Janklow, Tom Daschle, Al Gore, James Lee Witt, and Rick Weiland

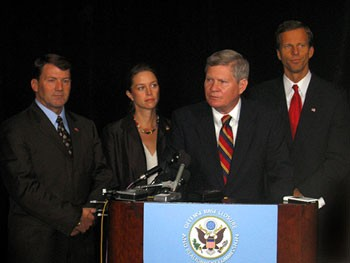
Johnson answering questions after helping prevent the closure of Ellsworth Air Force Base

U.S. House of Representatives
Preceded by Tom Daschle	Member of the U.S. House of Representatives from South Dakota's at-large congressional district 1987–1997	Succeeded by John Thune
Party political offices
Preceded by Ted Muenster	Democratic nominee for U.S. Senator from South Dakota (Class 2); 1996, 2002, 2008	Succeeded by Rick Weiland
U.S. Senate
Preceded by Larry Pressler	U.S. senator (Class 2) from South Dakota; 1997–2015; Served alongside: Tom Daschle, John Thune	Succeeded by Mike Rounds
Preceded by Chris Dodd	Chair of the Senate Banking Committee; 2011–2015	Succeeded by Richard Shelby
