= Joan Tabor =

American actress (1932–1968)

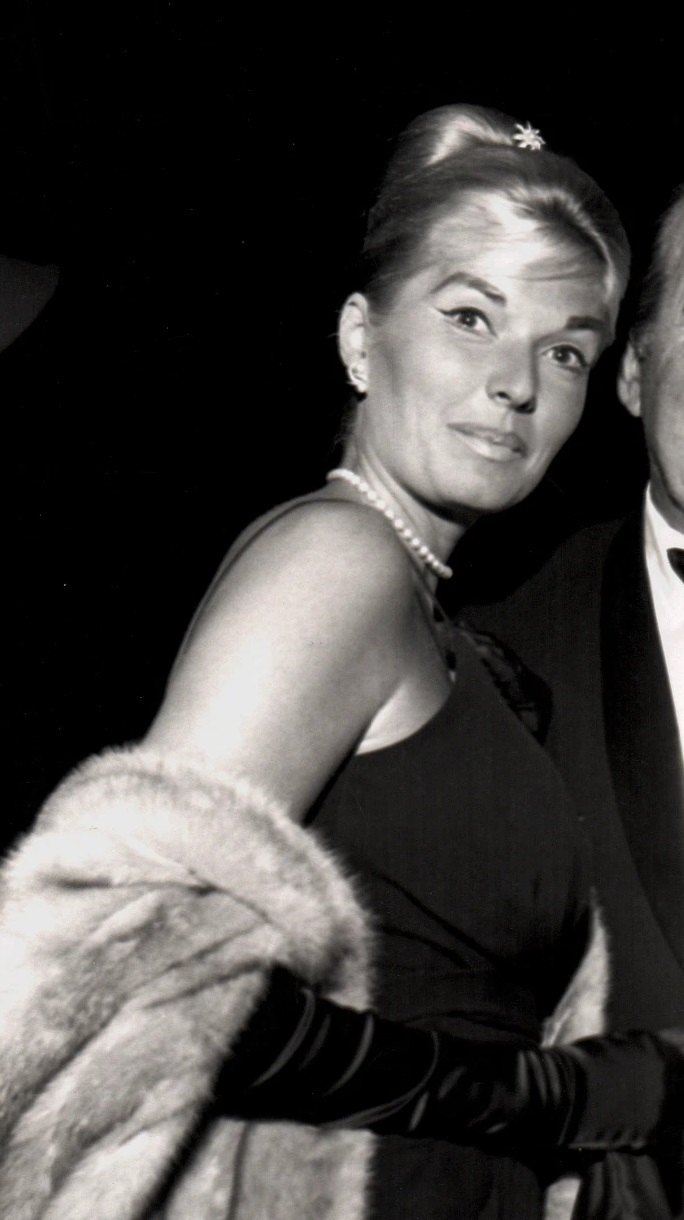
- Tabor in 1963
- Born: September 16, 1932; Sioux Falls, South Dakota, U.S.
- Died: December 18, 1968 (aged 36); Beverly Hills, California, U.S.
- Resting place: Woodlawn Cemetery (Sioux Falls, South Dakota)
- Years active: 1957-1964
- Spouses: David Gold (m. 1953; div. 1954) Broderick Crawford (m. 1962; div. 1967)
- Children: 1

Joan Tabor (also credited as Jean Tabor; September 16, 1932 – December 18, 1968) was an American film and television actress during the late 1950s and early 1960s.

== Early life ==
Tabor was born in Sioux Falls, South Dakota, the daughter of Mr. and Mrs. L. G. Tabor. She graduated from Washington High School in Sioux Falls in 1950 and continued her education at Augustana College and Goodman Theatre in Chicago.

== Career ==
Her acting credits include the film The Teenage Millionaire in 1961, and numerous appearances in such television series as The Red Skelton Show, playing Daisy June in the "Clem The Painter" sketch aired on April 22, 1958, Mister Ed (1961–1966), Arrest and Trial (1963–1964), Have Gun – Will Travel (1957–1963), Bat Masterson (1958–1961) including starring in its final episode, and Laramie (1959–1963). She guest-starred in the ABC adventure drama series Straightaway in the role of Patrice Hartley in the 1961 episode "The Racer and the Lady".

She appeared in CBS's Perry Mason in "The Case of the Substitute Face" in 1958 and "The Case of the Dubious Bridegroom" (billed as Jean Tabor) in 1959.

She had a role in series "Miami Undercover" as Lee Bowman in episode S1E16 "Miss Venus" (Feb.27.1961)

== Personal life ==
Tabor married actor Broderick Crawford on January 4, 1962, in Las Vegas, Nevada; the couple separated in 1965 and divorced in 1967.

== Death ==
She died in Beverly Hills, California, on December 18, 1968, after accidentally overdosing on influenza medication.

== Partial filmography ==
- Espionage: Far East (1961)
- Teenage Millionaire (1961) - Adrienne
- Laramie: Men in Shadows First Aired 5/30/61
