= Melissa Magstadt =

American politician

Member of the South Dakota House of Representatives from the 5th district
- Incumbent
- Assumed office January 11, 2011 Serving with Roger Solum (2011–present)
- Preceded by: Bob Faehn

Personal details
- Party: Republican

Melissa Magstadt is an American politician and a Republican member of the South Dakota House of Representatives representing District 5 since January 11, 2011.

== Elections ==
- 2012 Magstadt and incumbent Representative Roger Solum were unopposed for the June 5, 2012 Republican Primary and won the three-way November 6, 2012 General election where Madstadt took the first seat with 5,950 votes (40.11%) and incumbent Republican Representative Solum took the second seat ahead of Democratic nominee Dorothy Kellogg.
- 2010 When incumbent Republican Representative Bob Faehn left the Legislature and left a District 5 seat open, Magstadt ran in the three-way June 8, 2010 Republican Primary where Madstadt placed first with 1,126 votes (36.92%); in the three-way November 2, 2010 General election Madstadt took the first seat with 4,681 votes (35.50%) and incumbent Republican Representative Solum took the second seat ahead of Democratic nominee Jeff Dunn.
