= Steve Street =

American politician

Member of the South Dakota House of Representatives from the 4th district
- Incumbent
- Assumed office 2005

Personal details
- Born: September 4, 1950 (age 76) Ortonville, Minnesota
- Party: Democratic
- Spouse: Gail
- Education: South Dakota State University
- Occupation: Farmer

Steven T. Street is a Democratic member of the South Dakota House of Representatives, representing District 4 since 2005.
