= Margaret Gillespie (singer) =

Scottish singer

- Born: Margaret Duncan; 12 December 1841; New Deer, Aberdeenshire
- Died: 1913 (aged 71–72); South Africa
- Known for: Singer of traditional Scottish songs

Margaret Gillespie (née Duncan; 12 December 1841 - 1913) was a Scottish singer of traditional songs. She was a major informant for The Greig-Duncan Folk Song Collection, contributing 466 songs.

== Biography ==
Margaret Gillespie was born on 12 December 1831 in New Deer, Aberdeenshire, daughter of Elizabeth Birnie and William Duncan.

Gillespie is listed as the "most prolific informant" of The Grieg-Duncan Folk Song Collection. The collection includes 3,500 texts and 3,300 melodies from North-East Scotland.

Gillespie died in South Africa in 1913.
