= Lee Schoenbeck =

American politician

President pro tempore of the South Dakota Senate
- In office January 8, 2021 – January 14, 2025
- Preceded by: Brock Greenfield
- Succeeded by: Chris Karr

Member of the South Dakota Senate from the 5th district
- Incumbent
- Assumed office January 8, 2019
- In office January 2003 – January 2007
- In office January 1995 – January 1997

Member of the South Dakota House of Representatives from the 5th district
- In office January 2015 – January 2017

Personal details
- Born: Lee Anton Schoenbeck; May 14, 1958 (age 68) Webster, South Dakota, U.S.
- Party: Republican
- Spouse: Donna
- Children: 4
- Education: Augustana University (BA); University of South Dakota (JD)

Lee Anton Schoenbeck (born May 14, 1958) is an American politician and attorney serving as a member of the South Dakota Senate from the 5th district. He is the President Pro Tempore of the South Dakota Senate. He is a member of the Republican Party.

== Early life and education ==
Schoenbeck was born in Webster, South Dakota in 1958. He earned a Bachelor of Arts degree from Augustana University and a Juris Doctor from the University of South Dakota School of Law.

== Career ==
Schoenbeck is the owner of Schoenbeck Law, P.C., where he specializes in civil litigation.

== Political career ==
Schoenbeck served as a member of the Senate from 1995 to 1997 and again from 2003 to 2007. From 2015 to 2017, he represented the 5th district in the South Dakota House of Representatives.

In 2021, Schoenbeck opposed a proposal, pushed by Governor Kristi Noem and Senate Leader Gary Cammack (both fellow Republicans) to limit the activities of South Dakota Department of Game, Fish and Parks conservation officers. The same year, Schoenbeck also opposed a proposal to ban transgender girls from girls' sports; the bill was initially supported by Noem and opposed by Democrats, LGBT rights groups, and the South Dakota High School Activities Association. Ultimately, Noem vetoed the bill.

In 2021, Schoenbeck proposed an amendment to the South Dakota Constitution which would increase the threshold required to pass voter referendums from a majority to 60%. Schoenbeck said that he proposed the increase to block Medicaid expansion. The increase would limit a traditional instrument of grassroots direct democracy in the state.

In 2016, Schoenbeck was embroiled in an intra-party disagreement over a half-penny sales tax to boost the salaries of South Dakota public schoolteachers; Schoenbeck supported the sales tax, The teacher salary boost proposal passed, but some fellow Republicans opposed it and barred Schoenbeck from a Republican Party caucus meeting, prompting Schoenbeck to consider resigning.

== Personal life ==
Schoenbeck and his wife, Donna, have four children. He lives in Watertown, South Dakota.

South Dakota Senate
Preceded by Brock Greenfield	President pro tempore of the South Dakota Senate; 2021–2025	Succeeded by Chris Karr
