= Al Koistinen =

American politician

Member of the South Dakota House of Representatives from the 6th district
- In office 2001–2008

Personal details
- Born: March 21, 1948 (age 78)
- Party: Republican
- Profession: Businessman

Alton B. Koistinen (born March 21, 1948) is an American former politician. He was served in the South Dakota House of Representatives from 2001 to 2008.
