= 1996 United States Senate election in South Dakota =

- November 5, 1996
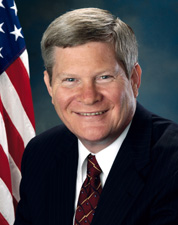

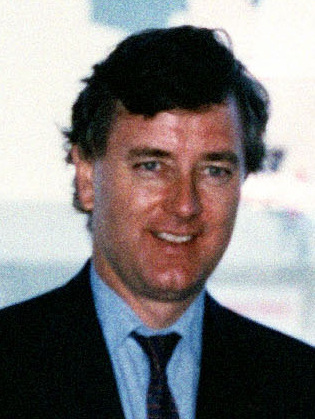
Nominee	Tim Johnson	Larry Pressler
Party	Democratic	Republican
Popular vote	166,533	157,954
Percentage	51.32%	48.68%
- County results Johnson: 50–60% 60–70% 70–80% 80–90% Pressler: 50–60% 60–70% 70–80%
U.S. senator before election
Larry Pressler
Republican
Elected U.S. Senator
Tim Johnson
Democratic

The 1996 United States Senate election in South Dakota was held on November 5, 1996. Incumbent Republican Senator Larry Pressler lost his bid for a fourth term to Democratic nominee Tim Johnson by 8,579 votes and a 2.64% margin. Pressler was the only incumbent U.S. Senator to lose a general election in the 1996 election cycle, of which this was the only Democratic flip. He later ran again unsuccessfully for this seat as an Independent in 2014, when Johnson did not seek re-election.

== General election ==
=== Candidates ===
- Tim Johnson, U.S. Representative at-large (Democratic)
- Larry Pressler, incumbent U.S. Senator (Republican)

=== Campaign ===
The race between Larry Pressler and Tim Johnson was one of the most competitive Senate races that year. From the onset, Johnson was seen as a potential candidate, and it was thought Pressler would face a tough race were Johnson, the state's sole congressman since 1987, to enter. Initially Johnson was quiet on his 1996 plans but after a delay due to his wife's breast cancer surgery, Johnson formally entered the race on April 2, 1996. Neither candidate faced any primary opposition.

One of the biggest issues of this campaign had to do with Pressler, the chair of the Senate Commerce Committee, and his increased stature. For example, Pressler received criticism for his suggestions to privatize public television. He also faced criticism for enquiring the ethnic background and gender identity of PBS employees. The backlash from the situation also led to bumper stickers saying "Keep public TV, privatize Pressler" popping up around the state. Another issue which would arise was related to the Telecommunications Act of 1996 a bill which Pressler authored. Johnson used the bill to attack Pressler for rising phone prices in South Dakota. This especially became a problem when Pressler had to pull an ad claiming phone rates went down, even though they had not. More challenging for Pressler, however, were the attacks relating to PAC donations Pressler received.

Pressler received significant donations from telecommunication entities and their Political Action Committees. In the first nine months of 1995, Pressler received more PAC donations than any other politician. In a small state such as South Dakota, this meant the money could be spent on numerous ads. That said, this proved a double edged sword for Pressler. Johnson criticized Pressler for the donations he took from these companies and tied the donations to the Telecom bill. Similarly, on tobacco donations, Pressler faced criticism for accepting over $50,000 in money from the tobacco industry, whereas Johnson had stopped accepting donations in 1995. This, coupled with allegations of Pressler using campaign funds for lavish travel, fed into Johnson's attacks that Pressler lost touch with the state's voters.

Johnson had faced the advantage of being the states lone U.S. House member, which some believe put him on an even keel with Pressler, and created the dynamic of an incumbent against another incumbent. Johnson also had a better record of winning, never getting less than 59% of the vote in his five campaigns and over performing Pressler on the same ballot in 1990. Pressler tried to attack Johnson's record charging that he was too liberal for voters of South Dakota. Pressler ran numerous ads, starting in July 1995, attacking Johnson as a liberal, though Johnson's campaign's polling showed these attacks did not land.

In terms of polling, it was seen as a close race throughout, albeit mostly through internal polls. In the end, Johnson was the victor of a close race, 166,533 votes (51%) to 157,954 votes (49%) in spite, of being outspent 8 to 5.

=== Results ===
General election results
Party	Candidate	Votes	%	±%
Democratic	Tim Johnson	166,533	51.32%	+6.25%
Republican	Larry Pressler (incumbent)	157,954	48.68%	−3.71%
Total votes		324,487	100.00%	N/A
Democratic gain from Republican				

== See also ==
- 1996 United States Senate elections
