= Ried Holien =

American politician (born 1969)

Member of the South Dakota Senate from the 5th district
- In office January 11, 2011 – January 10, 2017
- Preceded by: Nancy Turbak Berry
- Succeeded by: Neal Tapio

Personal details
- Born: August 18, 1969 (age 57) Watertown, South Dakota
- Party: Republican
- Spouse: Tonya Holien
- Children: Rachel, Tessa, Cate, and Gabriel Holien
- Education: Augustana College
- Website: riedholien.com

Ried Scot Holien (born August 18, 1969) is an American politician who serves as the mayor of Watertown, South Dakota, and as a member of the Republican Party, he is a former member of the South Dakota Senate representing District 5 from 2011 to 2017.

== Elections ==
- 2021 Holien defeated Mayor Sarah Caron to become the mayor of Watertown, South Dakota with 3,010 votes for Holien and 1,237 votes for Caron.
- 2012 Holien was unopposed for the June 5, 2012 Republican Primary and won the November 6, 2012 General election with 5,900 votes (60.54%) against Democratic nominee Jeff Dunn, who had run for the South Dakota House of Representatives in 2010.
- 2010 To challenge Senate District 5 incumbent Democratic Senator Nancy Turbak Berry, Holien was unopposed for the June 8, 2010 Republican Primary and won the November 2, 2010 General election with 4,642 votes (53.04%) against Senator Turbak Berry.
