= Solum Lake =

Lake in the state of Minnesota, United States

- Location within Minnesota
- Location: Clay County, Minnesota
- Coordinates: 46°51′59″N 96°11′44″W
- Type: lake

Solum Lake is a lake in Clay County, Minnesota, in the United States.

Solum Lake was named for H. H. Solum, a farmer who settled there.

== See also ==
- List of lakes in Minnesota
