= Burdette Solum =

American politician

Burdette C. Solum (August 16, 1927 – December 28, 2012) was an American politician from Watertown, South Dakota and served in the South Dakota House of Representatives from 1991 to 1992 and again as a vacancy from 1998 until 2004.

Solum was a 21-year veteran of the South Dakota National Guard including the Korean War and also served in the Army during World War II.
