= George Jonathan Danforth =

American politician (1875–1952)

George Jonathan Danforth (November 21, 1875 – March 30, 1952) was a member of the South Dakota Senate.

== Early life ==
George Jonathan Danforth was born on November 21, 1875, in Meeme, Wisconsin, to Quincy A. and Gertrude (née Silbernagel) Danforth. He attended the University of Wisconsin-Oshkosh and the University of Wisconsin-Madison. In 1903, he moved to Sioux Falls, South Dakota.

== Career ==
Danforth was a member of the Senate from 1919 to 1922. Previously, he had been State's Attorney of Minnehaha County, South Dakota. In 1930 and 1938, Danforth was a candidate in the Republican primary for the United States Senate. He lost to incumbent William H. McMaster in 1930 and to John Chandler Gurney in 1938.

== Death ==
Danforth died on March 30, 1952. He was buried in Woodlawn Cemetery.

== Personal life ==
On August 21, 1907, Danforth married Nora I. Tollefson. He was a Congregationalist.
