= Nancy York =

American politician

Member of the South Dakota House of Representatives from the 5th district
- Incumbent
- Assumed office January 10, 2017

Personal details
- Party: Republican

Nancy York is an American politician serving as a member of the South Dakota House of Representatives from the 5th district. First elected in 2016, she assumed office on January 10, 2017 and serves on the health and local government committees.

Prior to her election to the South Dakota legislature she served on the Watertown city council.
