= Hugh Bartels =

American politician

Speaker of the South Dakota House of Representatives
- In office January 10, 2023 – January 14, 2025
- Preceded by: Spencer Gosch
- Succeeded by: Jon Hansen

Member of the South Dakota House of Representatives from the 5th district
- In office January 2017 – January 14, 2025

Personal details
- Born: February 22, 1953 (age 73)
- Party: Republican
- Education: University of South Dakota

Hugh M. Bartels (born February 22, 1953) is an American politician and a former Republican member of the South Dakota House of Representatives representing District 5 from 2017 to 2025. Bartels served on the Committee on Appropriations, the Government Operations and Audit committee, and the Joint Committee on Appropriations. Bartel served as the chair of the Retirement Laws committee.

Political offices
Preceded by Spencer Gosch	Speaker of the South Dakota House of Representatives; 2023–2025	Succeeded by Jon Hansen
