= Jim Peterson (South Dakota politician) =

American politician

James R. Peterson

Member of the South Dakota Senate from the 4th district
- In office 2005–present

Personal details
- Born: March 16, 1943 (age 83) Revillo, South Dakota
- Party: Democratic
- Spouse: Jane
- Education: Augustana College
- Profession: Educator, farmer

James R. Peterson is a former Democratic member of the South Dakota Senate. He represented the 4th district from 2015 to 2017, and again from 2005 to 2011. He served as minority whip during the 2015 legislative session. Earlier he was a member of the South Dakota House of Representatives from 2001 to 2004, and again from 2013 and 2015.
