= Margaret V. Gillespie =

American politician (born 1969)

Member of the South Dakota Senate
- In office 2009–2010

Member of the South Dakota House of Representatives
- In office 2001–2008

Personal details
- Born: February 15, 1969 (age 57) Hawarden, Iowa, U.S.
- Party: Democratic
- Profession: Attorney

Margaret Vandemore Gillespie (born February 15, 1969) is an American politician. She was a Democratic member of the South Dakota House of Representatives from 2001 to 2008, and a Democratic member of the South Dakota Senate from 2009 to 2010, representing South Dakota's 16th district. Her district included Lincoln and Union counties.

Gillespie received a B.A. from Augustana College in 1991 and a J.D. from the University of South Dakota School of Law in 1996. Gillespie is an attorney living in Hudson, South Dakota.
