= 2026 South Dakota House of Representatives election =

American state election

- November 3, 2026

All 70 seats in the South Dakota House of Representatives 36 seats needed for a majority
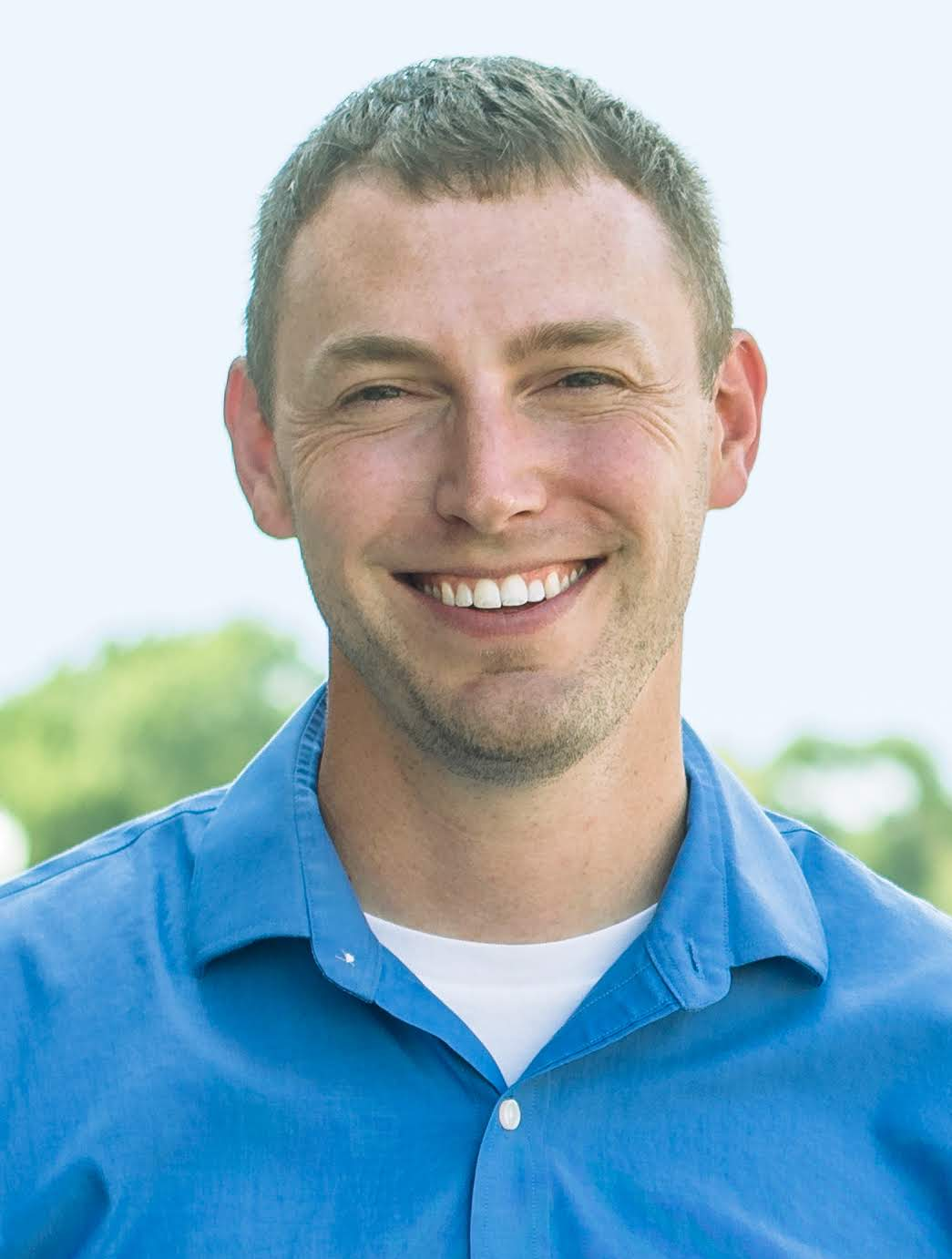

| | Majority party | Minority party |
|---|---|---|
| Leader | Jon Hansen | Erin Healy |
| Party | Republican | Democratic |
| Leader's seat | 25th | 10th |
| Last election | 64 | 6 |
| Seats before | 65 | 5 |
| Seats after | 59 | 10 |
| Seat change | ▼6 | ▲5 |
| | Third party |
| Party | Independent |
| Last election | 0 |
| Seats before | 0 |
| Seats after | 1 |
| Seat change | ▲1 |
- Map of the incumbents: Republican incumbent Democratic incumbent
Speaker before election
Jon Hansen
Republican
Elected Speaker
TBD

The 2026 South Dakota House of Representatives election is an election that was held on November 3, 2026, to elect all 70 members of the state's House of Representatives, alongside other state and federal elections.

== Background ==
At the previous election in 2024, the Republican Party retained control of the House, taking 64 seats and flipping one seat from the Democratic Party. The Democratic Party took 6 seats in the House.

=== Retiring incumbents ===
Representatives who have served eight years in the chamber are not eligible for re-election.

==== Republicans ====
1. District 2: David Kull and John Sjaarda are retiring to run for state senate.
2. District 3: Brandei Schaefbauer is retiring.
3. District 5: Josephine Garcia is retiring to run for state senate.
4. District 6: Aaron Aylward is retiring.
5. District 8: Tim Reisch and Tim Walburg are retiring.
6. District 9: Bethany Soye is retiring.
7. District 12: Greg Jamison is retiring to run for mayor of Sioux Falls.
8. District 16: Karla Lems is retiring to run for lieutenant governor.
9. District 17: William Shorma is retiring.
10. District 18: Julie Auch is retiring.
11. District 20: Kaley Nolz is retiring.
12. District 23: Scott Moore is retiring.
13. District 24: Will Mortenson is retiring.
14. District 25: Jon Hansen is term-limited and Leslie Heinemann is retiring.
15. District 26B: Rebecca Reimer is term-limited.
16. District 27: Peri Pourier is term-limited.
17. District 35: Tina Mulally and Tony Randolph are term-limited.

==== Democrats ====
1. District 10: Erin Healy is term-limited.
2. District 15: Eric Muckey is retiring to run for state senate.

== Incumbents defeated ==
=== In primary elections ===
==== Republicans ====
1. District 1: Logan Manhart lost renomination to Daniel Kjos.
2. District 3: Al Novstrup lost renomination to Tim Hanigan and Spencer Sommers.
3. District 4: Dylan Jordan and Kent Roe lost renomination to Fred Deutsch and Ryan Kohl.
4. District 6: Tim Czmowski lost renomination to Jerry Jongeling and Elliott Neff.
5. District 10: Bobbi Andera lost renomination to Kim Petterson and John Pohlman.
6. District 16: Tony Kayser lost renomination to Tyler Tordsen.
7. District 29: Terri Jorgenson and Kathy Rice lost renomination to Gary Cammack and Gary Deering.
8. District 34: Heather Baxter lost renomination to Becky Drury.

== Predictions ==
| Source | Ranking | As of |
|---|---|---|
| Sabato's Crystal Ball | Safe R | January 22, 2026 |
| State Navigate | Safe R | October 24, 2026 |

== Results by district ==
=== District 1 ===
District 1 Republican primary
| Party | Candidate | Votes | % |
|---|---|---|---|
| Republican | Nick Fosness (incumbent) | 1,855 | 29.58% |
| Republican | Daniel Kjos | 1,664 | 26.53% |
| Republican | Logan Manhart (incumbent) | 1,398 | 22.29% |
| Republican | Keith Miller | 1,355 | 21.60% |
| Total votes | | 6,272 | 100.00% |

District 1 general election
| Party | Candidate | Votes | % |
|---|---|---|---|
| Republican | Daniel Kjos | 5,446 | 39.06% |
| Republican | Nick Fosness (incumbent) | 5,144 | 36.89% |
| Democratic | Courtney Gale Enfield | 3,353 | 24.05% |
| Total votes | | 13,943 | 100.00% |

=== District 2 ===
District 2 Republican primary
| Party | Candidate | Votes | % |
|---|---|---|---|
| Republican | Adam Long | 2,004 | 32.57% |
| Republican | Manuel Luschas | 1,634 | 26.56% |
| Republican | Brandon Lane | 1,394 | 22.66% |
| Republican | Dawn Hill | 1,120 | 18.21% |
| Total votes | | 6,152 | 100.00% |

District 2 general election
| Party | Candidate | Votes | % |
|---|---|---|---|
| Republican | Adam Long | 6,594 | 40.98% |
| Republican | Manuel Luschas | 5,309 | 33.00% |
| Democratic | Blake Rife | 4,187 | 26.02% |
| Total votes | | 16,090 | 100.00% |

=== District 3 ===
District 3 Republican primary
| Party | Candidate | Votes | % |
|---|---|---|---|
| Republican | Spencer Sommers | 2,217 | 32.17% |
| Republican | Timothy Hanigan | 1,980 | 28.73% |
| Republican | Al Novstrup (incumbent) | 1,598 | 23.19% |
| Republican | Kaleb Weis | 1,096 | 15.90% |
| Total votes | | 6,891 | 100.00% |

District 3 general election
| Party | Candidate | Votes | % |
|---|---|---|---|
| Republican | Spencer Sommers | 4,354 | 37.04% |
| Republican | Timothy Hanigan | 3,772 | 32.09% |
| Democratic | Erin Ronayne Rudner | 3,629 | 30.87% |
| Total votes | | 11,755 | 100.00% |

=== District 4 ===
District 4 Republican primary
| Party | Candidate | Votes | % |
|---|---|---|---|
| Republican | Ryan Kohl | 2,385 | 26.40% |
| Republican | Fred Deutsch | 2,326 | 25.74% |
| Republican | Kent Roe (incumbent) | 2,254 | 24.95% |
| Republican | Dylan C. Jordan (incumbent) | 1,837 | 20.33% |
| Republican | Gary William Hudiburgh III | 233 | 2.58% |
| Total votes | | 9,035 | 100.00% |

District 4 general election
| Party | Candidate | Votes | % |
|---|---|---|---|
| Republican | Ryan Kohl | 6,856 | 39.50% |
| Republican | Fred Deutsch | 6,131 | 35.32% |
| Democratic | Emelia Enquist | 2,725 | 15.70% |
| Independent | Samuel Froehlke | 1,646 | 9.48% |
| Total votes | | 17,358 | 100.00% |

=== District 5 ===
District 5 general election
| Party | Candidate | Votes | % |
|---|---|---|---|
| Republican | Matt Roby (incumbent) | 5,825 | 46.04% |
| Republican | Byron Callies | 4,137 | 32.70% |
| Independent | Neal Tapio | 2,691 | 21.27% |
| Total votes | | 12,653 | 100.00% |

=== District 6 ===
District 6 Republican primary
| Party | Candidate | Votes | % |
|---|---|---|---|
| Republican | Jerry Jongeling | 1,413 | 33.27% |
| Republican | Elliott Neff | 1,390 | 32.73% |
| Republican | Ned Horsted | 737 | 17.35% |
| Republican | Tim Czmowski (incumbent) | 707 | 16.65% |
| Total votes | | 4,247 | 100.00% |

District 6 general election
| Party | Candidate | Votes | % |
|---|---|---|---|
| Republican | Jerry Jongeling | 4,925 | 32.72% |
| Republican | Elliott Neff | 4,365 | 29.00% |
| Democratic | Austin Wolf | 3,066 | 20.37% |
| Democratic | Garret M. Campbell | 2,694 | 17.90% |
| Total votes | | 15,050 | 100.00% |

=== District 7 ===
District 7 Republican primary
| Party | Candidate | Votes | % |
|---|---|---|---|
| Republican | Mellissa Heermann (incumbent) | 1,683 | 38.58% |
| Republican | Roger DeGroot (incumbent) | 1,678 | 38.47% |
| Republican | Dennis Willert | 1,001 | 22.95% |
| Total votes | | 4,362 | 100.00% |

District 7 general election
| Party | Candidate | Votes | % |
|---|---|---|---|
| Republican | Mellissa Heermann (incumbent) | 4,699 | 37.10% |
| Republican | Roger DeGroot (incumbent) | 4,457 | 35.19% |
| Democratic | Blake Stevens | 3,509 | 27.71% |
| Total votes | | 12,665 | 100.00% |

=== District 8 ===
District 8 Republican primary
| Party | Candidate | Votes | % |
|---|---|---|---|
| Republican | Todd Wilkinson | 2,657 | 37.43% |
| Republican | Jon Nelson | 1,606 | 22.62% |
| Republican | Danny Brown | 1,293 | 18.21% |
| Republican | Samuel Krueger | 778 | 10.96% |
| Republican | James Sapp | 765 | 10.78% |
| Total votes | | 7,099 | 100.00% |

District 8 general election
| Party | Candidate | Votes | % |
|---|---|---|---|
| Republican | Jon Nelson | 6,188 | 52.06% |
| Republican | Todd Wilkinson | 5,699 | 47.94% |
| Total votes | | 11,887 | 100.00% |

=== District 9 ===
District 9 Republican primary
| Party | Candidate | Votes | % |
|---|---|---|---|
| Republican | Tesa Schwans (incumbent) | 1,541 | 33.20% |
| Republican | Megan Tschetter | 1,247 | 26.87% |
| Republican | Randy Bury | 1,017 | 21.91% |
| Republican | Zach Mulder | 836 | 18.01% |
| Total votes | | 4,641 | 100.00% |

District 9 general election
| Party | Candidate | Votes | % |
|---|---|---|---|
| Republican | Tesa Schwans (incumbent) | 4,575 | 35.39% |
| Republican | Megan Tschetter | 4,254 | 32.91% |
| Democratic | Amanda Potter | 4,097 | 31.70% |
| Total votes | | 12,926 | 100.00% |

=== District 10 ===
District 10 Republican primary
| Party | Candidate | Votes | % |
|---|---|---|---|
| Republican | John Pohlman | 948 | 34.88% |
| Republican | Kimberly Petterson | 908 | 33.41% |
| Republican | Bobbi Andera (incumbent) | 862 | 31.71% |
| Total votes | | 2,718 | 100.00% |

District 10 general election
| Party | Candidate | Votes | % |
|---|---|---|---|
| Democratic | Kathleen Brudvig | 4,182 | 31.36% |
| Democratic | Adam Bair | 3,763 | 28.22% |
| Republican | John Pohlman | 2,851 | 21.38% |
| Republican | Kimberly Petterson | 2,539 | 19.04% |
| Total votes | | 13,335 | 100.00% |

=== District 11 ===
District 11 Republican primary
| Party | Candidate | Votes | % |
|---|---|---|---|
| Republican | Keri Weems (incumbent) | 1,589 | 38.44% |
| Republican | Brian Mulder (incumbent) | 1,582 | 38.27% |
| Republican | John C. Kunnari | 963 | 23.29% |
| Total votes | | 4,134 | 100.00% |

District 11 general election
| Party | Candidate | Votes | % |
|---|---|---|---|
| Democratic | Sonja Mentzer | 4,234 | 30.16% |
| Republican | Brian Mulder (incumbent) | 4,190 | 29.85% |
| Republican | Keri Weems (incumbent) | 4,061 | 28.93% |
| Libertarian | Tracey Quint | 1,554 | 11.07% |
| Total votes | | 14,039 | 100.00% |

=== District 12 ===
District 12 general election
| Party | Candidate | Votes | % |
|---|---|---|---|
| Democratic | Stephanie Arne | 4,270 | 36.36% |
| Republican | Amber Arlint (incumbent) | 4,125 | 35.12% |
| Republican | Kerry Loudenslager | 3,349 | 28.52% |
| Total votes | | 11,744 | 100.00% |

=== District 13 ===
District 13 Republican primary
| Party | Candidate | Votes | % |
|---|---|---|---|
| Republican | Jack Kolbeck (incumbent) | 2,237 | 35.25% |
| Republican | John Hughes (incumbent) | 2,118 | 33.38% |
| Republican | Nick Kotzea | 1,991 | 31.37% |
| Total votes | | 6,346 | 100.00% |

District 13 general election
| Party | Candidate | Votes | % |
|---|---|---|---|
| Republican | Jack Kolbeck (incumbent) | 5,873 | 35.10% |
| Democratic | Ali Rae Horsted | 5,584 | 33.38% |
| Republican | John Hughes (incumbent) | 5,274 | 31.52% |
| Total votes | | 16,731 | 100.00% |

=== District 14 ===
District 14 Republican primary
| Party | Candidate | Votes | % |
|---|---|---|---|
| Republican | Taylor Rehfeldt (incumbent) | 2,457 | 42.64% |
| Republican | Tyler Tordsen | 1,678 | 29.12% |
| Republican | Tony Kayser (incumbent) | 1,627 | 28.24% |
| Total votes | | 5,762 | 100.00% |

District 14 general election
| Party | Candidate | Votes | % |
|---|---|---|---|
| Republican | Taylor Rehfeldt (incumbent) | 5,501 | 35.70% |
| Democratic | Erinn Williams | 5,258 | 34.13% |
| Republican | Tyler Tordsen | 4,649 | 30.17% |
| Total votes | | 15,408 | 100.00% |

=== District 15 ===
District 15 general election
| Party | Candidate | Votes | % |
|---|---|---|---|
| Democratic | Kadyn Wittman (incumbent) | 3,202 | 32.76% |
| Democratic | June Copperstad | 2,906 | 29.73% |
| Republican | Joni Tschetter | 1,886 | 19.30% |
| Republican | Andre Zachariahs | 1,780 | 18.21% |
| Total votes | | 9,774 | 100.00% |

=== District 16 ===
District 16 Republican primary
| Party | Candidate | Votes | % |
|---|---|---|---|
| Republican | Lisa Bogue | 2,192 | 42.64% |
| Republican | John Shubeck (incumbent) | 1,947 | 29.12% |
| Republican | Jason D. VanDenTop | 1,879 | 28.24% |
| Total votes | | 5,762 | 100.00% |

District 16 general election
| Party | Candidate | Votes | % |
|---|---|---|---|
| Republican | Lisa Bogue | 5,355 | 39.42% |
| Republican | John Shubeck (incumbent) | 4,837 | 35.60% |
| Democratic | Tim Rhead | 3,394 | 24.98% |
| Total votes | | 13,586 | 100.00% |

=== District 17 ===
District 17 Republican primary
| Party | Candidate | Votes | % |
|---|---|---|---|
| Republican | Chris Kassin (incumbent) | 2,133 | 60.15% |
| Republican | Troy Redler | 1,106 | 31.19% |
| Republican | Robin Schiro | 307 | 8.66% |
| Total votes | | 3,546 | 100.00% |

District 17 general election
| Party | Candidate | Votes | % |
|---|---|---|---|
| Republican | Chris Kassin (incumbent) | 4,588 | 31.60% |
| Republican | Troy Redler | 3,797 | 26.15% |
| Democratic | Leslie Gerrish | 3,440 | 23.69% |
| Democratic | Austin Brunick | 2,695 | 18.56% |
| Total votes | | 14,520 | 100.00% |

=== District 18 ===
District 18 Republican primary
| Party | Candidate | Votes | % |
|---|---|---|---|
| Republican | Mike Stevens (incumbent) | 2,256 | 41.31% |
| Republican | John Marquardt | 1,719 | 31.48% |
| Republican | Michael Nutley | 1,486 | 27.21% |
| Total votes | | 5,461 | 100.00% |

District 18 general election
| Party | Candidate | Votes | % |
|---|---|---|---|
| Republican | Mike Stevens | 5,105 | 35.61% |
| Republican | John Marquardt | 3,852 | 26.87% |
| Democratic | Karen Springer | 3,021 | 21.07% |
| Democratic | Jarod Holcomb | 2,357 | 16.44% |
| Total votes | | 14,335 | 100.00% |

=== District 19 ===
District 19 Republican primary
| Party | Candidate | Votes | % |
|---|---|---|---|
| Republican | Jessica Bahmuller (incumbent) | 3,385 | 44.55% |
| Republican | Drew Peterson (incumbent) | 2,767 | 36.41% |
| Republican | Tanner Michael Hento | 1,447 | 19.04% |
| Total votes | | 7,599 | 100.00% |

District 19 general election
| Party | Candidate | Votes | % |
|---|---|---|---|
| Republican | Jessica Bahmuller (incumbent) | 5,580 | 42.28% |
| Republican | Drew Peterson | 5,506 | 41.72% |
| Democratic | Heidi Hora | 2,112 | 16.00% |
| Total votes | | 13,198 | 100.00% |

=== District 20 ===
District 20 general election
| Party | Candidate | Votes | % |
|---|---|---|---|
| Republican | Jeff Bathke | 4,559 | 52.25% |
| Republican | Terry Sabers | 4,167 | 47.75% |
| Total votes | | 8,726 | 100.00% |

=== District 21 ===
District 21 Republican primary
| Party | Candidate | Votes | % |
|---|---|---|---|
| Republican | Marty Overweg (incumbent) | 3,222 | 35.09% |
| Republican | Jim Halverson (incumbent) | 2,761 | 30.07% |
| Republican | John H. Harter | 2,053 | 22.36% |
| Republican | Wyatt DeJong | 1,147 | 12.49% |
| Total votes | | 9,183 | 100.00% |

District 21 general election
| Party | Candidate | Votes | % |
|---|---|---|---|
| Republican | Jim Halverson (incumbent) | 5,529 | 52.74% |
| Republican | Marty Overweg | 4,954 | 47.26% |
| Total votes | | 10,483 | 100.00% |

=== District 22 ===
District 22 general election
| Party | Candidate | Votes | % |
|---|---|---|---|
| Republican | Lana Greenfield (incumbent) | 4,376 | 39.17% |
| Republican | Kevin Van Diepen (incumbent) | 4,318 | 38.65% |
| Democratic | Cully Williams | 2,478 | 22.18% |
| Total votes | | 11,172 | 100.00% |

=== District 23 ===
District 23 Republican primary
| Party | Candidate | Votes | % |
|---|---|---|---|
| Republican | Spencer Gosch (incumbent) | 3,871 | 44.17% |
| Republican | Dick Werner | 2,504 | 28.57% |
| Republican | Amber Werdel | 2,388 | 27.25% |
| Total votes | | 8,763 | 100.00% |

District 23 general election
| Party | Candidate | Votes | % |
|---|---|---|---|
| Republican | Spencer Gosch (incumbent) | 5,579 | 42.72% |
| Republican | Dick Werner | 5,190 | 39.74% |
| Independent | Garett Heinz | 2,290 | 17.54% |
| Total votes | | 13,059 | 100.00% |

=== District 24 ===
District 24 Republican primary
| Party | Candidate | Votes | % |
|---|---|---|---|
| Republican | Mike Weisgram (incumbent) | 3,707 | 32.57% |
| Republican | Laurie Gill | 2,627 | 23.08% |
| Republican | Regan Bollweg | 2,330 | 20.47% |
| Republican | Tim Rounds | 1,824 | 16.02% |
| Republican | Brian Burge | 895 | 7.86% |
| Total votes | | 11,383 | 100.00% |

District 24 general election
| Party | Candidate | Votes | % |
|---|---|---|---|
| Republican | Mike Weisgram (incumbent) | 6,308 | 50.74% |
| Republican | Laurie Gill | 6,123 | 49.26% |
| Total votes | | 12,431 | 100.00% |

=== District 25 ===
District 25 Republican primary
| Party | Candidate | Votes | % |
|---|---|---|---|
| Republican | Nick Buchholz | 1,986 | 34.68% |
| Republican | Carrie Sanderson | 1,922 | 33.56% |
| Republican | Bart L. Sample | 1,819 | 31.76% |
| Total votes | | 5,727 | 100.00% |

District 25 general election
| Party | Candidate | Votes | % |
|---|---|---|---|
| Republican | Carrie Sanderson | 6,324 | 57.88% |
| Republican | Nick Buchholz | 4,602 | 42.12% |
| Total votes | | 10,926 | 100.00% |

=== District 26A ===
District 26A general election
| Party | Candidate | Votes | % |
|---|---|---|---|
| Democratic | Eric Emery (incumbent) | 1,523 | 64.48% |
| Republican | Ron Frederick | 839 | 35.52% |
| Total votes | | 2,362 | 100.00% |

=== District 26B ===
District 26B Republican primary
| Party | Candidate | Votes | % |
|---|---|---|---|
| Republican | Angi Hanzlik | 882 | 53.71% |
| Republican | Will Mahnke | 760 | 46.29% |
| Total votes | | 1,642 | 100.00% |

District 26B general election
| Party | Candidate | Votes | % |
|---|---|---|---|
| Republican | Angi Hanzlik | 2,419 | 68.29% |
| Democratic | Lewis J. Grassrope | 1,123 | 31.71% |
| Total votes | | 3,542 | 100.00% |

=== District 27 ===
Incumbent Republican Liz Marty May is running for re-election, while Peri Pourier, who switched to the Republican Party in 2025, is running for state Senate as an independent. Democrat Elizabeth Lone Eagle's petition for the primary ballot was rejected, and no other candidates besides May filed for the primary. Lone Eagle later filed as an independent and was joined on the ballot for the general election by three other independents. No independent has been elected to the South Dakota Legislature since 2010, but at least one is guaranteed to win in this election.

District 27 general election
| Party | Candidate | Votes | % |
|---|---|---|---|
| Republican | Liz Marty May (incumbent) | 2,453 | 33.66% |
| Independent | Evangeline Poor Bear | 1,600 | 21.95% |
| Independent | Joe Flood | 1,471 | 20.18% |
| Independent | Elizabeth Lone Eagle | 1,009 | 13.84% |
| Independent | Jay Yohner | 755 | 10.36% |
| Total votes | | 7,288 | 100.00% |

=== District 28A ===
District 28A general election
| Party | Candidate | Votes | % |
|---|---|---|---|
| Republican | Jana Hunt (incumbent) | 1,832 | 58.55% |
| Democratic | Chas Jewett | 1,297 | 41.45% |
| Total votes | | 3,129 | 100.00% |

=== District 28B ===
District 28B Republican primary
| Party | Candidate | Votes | % |
|---|---|---|---|
| Republican | Travis Ismay (incumbent) | 1,597 | 54.88% |
| Republican | Larry Schmaltz | 1,313 | 45.12% |
| Total votes | | 2,910 | 100.00% |

District 28B general election
| Party | Candidate | Votes | % |
|---|---|---|---|
| Republican | Travis Ismay (incumbent) | 3,384 | 100.00% |
| Total votes | | 3,384 | 100.00% |

=== District 29 ===
District 29 Republican primary
| Party | Candidate | Votes | % |
|---|---|---|---|
| Republican | Gary Deering | 2,199 | 27.97% |
| Republican | Gary Cammack | 2,135 | 27.15% |
| Republican | Kathy Rice (incumbent) | 1,957 | 24.89% |
| Republican | Terri Jorgenson (incumbent) | 1,572 | 19.99% |
| Total votes | | 7,863 | 100.00% |

District 29 general election
| Party | Candidate | Votes | % |
|---|---|---|---|
| Republican | Gary Cammack | 5,160 | 52.71% |
| Republican | Gary Deering | 4,630 | 47.29% |
| Total votes | | 9,790 | 100.00% |

=== District 30 ===
District 30 Republican primary
| Party | Candidate | Votes | % |
|---|---|---|---|
| Republican | Tim Goodwin (incumbent) | 3,709 | 39.16% |
| Republican | Trish Ladner (incumbent) | 3,450 | 36.42% |
| Republican | Stephen Saint | 2,313 | 24.42% |
| Total votes | | 9,472 | 100.00% |

District 30 general election
| Party | Candidate | Votes | % |
|---|---|---|---|
| Republican | Trish Ladner (incumbent) | 7,725 | 41.44% |
| Republican | Tim Goodwin (incumbent) | 7,388 | 39.63% |
| Democratic | Bret Swanson | 3,530 | 18.93% |
| Total votes | | 18,643 | 100.00% |

=== District 31 ===
District 31 general election
| Party | Candidate | Votes | % |
|---|---|---|---|
| Republican | Scott Odenbach (incumbent) | 6,253 | 38.81% |
| Republican | Mary Fitzgerald (incumbent) | 5,991 | 37.19% |
| Democratic | Morgan Plucker | 3,867 | 24.00% |
| Total votes | | 16,111 | 100.00% |

=== District 32 ===
District 32 general election
| Party | Candidate | Votes | % |
|---|---|---|---|
| Democratic | Nicole Uhre-Balk (incumbent) | 3,283 | 32.76% |
| Republican | Steve Duffy (incumbent) | 2,666 | 26.60% |
| Republican | Zachary Martin | 2,317 | 23.12% |
| Independent | Samuel Hare Sr. | 1,756 | 17.52% |
| Total votes | | 10,022 | 100.00% |

=== District 33 ===
District 33 Republican primary
| Party | Candidate | Votes | % |
|---|---|---|---|
| Republican | Phil Jensen (incumbent) | 2,286 | 30.63% |
| Republican | Curt Massie (incumbent) | 1,988 | 26.64% |
| Republican | Jeff Marlette | 1,983 | 26.57% |
| Republican | Sandra Comer | 1,206 | 16.16% |
| Total votes | | 7,463 | 100.00% |

District 33 general election
| Party | Candidate | Votes | % |
|---|---|---|---|
| Republican | Curt Massie (incumbent) | 5,824 | 38.75% |
| Republican | Phil Jensen (incumbent) | 5,403 | 35.95% |
| Democratic | Kari Hall | 3,803 | 25.30% |
| Total votes | | 15,030 | 100.00% |

=== District 34 ===
District 34 Republican primary
| Party | Candidate | Votes | % |
|---|---|---|---|
| Republican | Mike Derby (incumbent) | 2,710 | 42.44% |
| Republican | Becky Drury | 1,861 | 29.14% |
| Republican | Heather Baxter (incumbent) | 1,815 | 28.42% |
| Total votes | | 6,386 | 100.00% |

District 34 general election
| Party | Candidate | Votes | % |
|---|---|---|---|
| Republican | Mike Derby (incumbent) | 5,453 | 38.26% |
| Republican | Becky Drury | 4,941 | 34.67% |
| Democratic | Victor Diego Dominquez | 3,858 | 27.07% |
| Total votes | | 14,252 | 100.00% |

=== District 35 ===
District 35 Republican primary
| Party | Candidate | Votes | % |
|---|---|---|---|
| Republican | Dale Bartscher | 1,241 | 33.78% |
| Republican | Jason Fleming | 1,205 | 32.80% |
| Republican | Jace West | 744 | 20.25% |
| Republican | Emmett Reistroffer | 484 | 13.17% |
| Total votes | | 3,674 | 100.00% |

District 35 general election
| Party | Candidate | Votes | % |
|---|---|---|---|
| Republican | Jason Fleming | 3,751 | 39.50% |
| Republican | Dale Bartscher | 3,262 | 34.35% |
| Democratic | Ken Jeakins | 2,483 | 26.15% |
| Total votes | | 9,496 | 100.00% |
