= 2024 South Dakota House of Representatives election =

- November 5, 2024

All 70 seats in the South Dakota House of Representatives 36 seats needed for a majority

	Majority party	Minority party
Leader	Hugh Bartels (term-limited)	Oren Lesmeister (term-limited)
Party	Republican	Democratic
Leader's seat	District 5	District 28A
Seats before	63	7
Seats after	64	6
Seat change	▲1	▼1
Popular vote	452,994	114,668
Percentage	78.03%	19.75%
Swing	▲2.53%	▼4.08%
- Results: Republican gain Democratic gain Republican hold Democratic hold
Speaker before election
Hugh Bartels
Republican
Elected Speaker
Jon Hansen
Republican

The 2024 South Dakota House of Representatives elections were held on November 5, 2024, to elect all 70 seats in the South Dakota House of Representatives. The elections coincided with the presidential, U.S. House, and State Senate elections. The primary elections were held on June 4, 2024.

== Partisan background ==
In the 2020 presidential election, Republican Donald Trump won 33 of South Dakota's state House of Representatives districts and Democrat Joe Biden won 4 districts. Going into the 2024 South Dakota House of Representatives election, Republicans held one House of Representatives seat in a district that voted for Biden in 2020: District 27, a rural district with a majority Native American population (Biden +8%). Conversely, Democrats held one House seat in a district that voted for Trump in 2020: District 28A, another rural district also with a majority Native American population (Trump +3%).

Biden 50–60% 60–70% / Trump 40–50% 50–60% 60–70% 70–80% 80–90%

== Retirements ==
=== Democrats ===
1. District 15: Linda Duba retired.
2. District 28A: Oren Lesmeister was term-limited.

=== Republicans ===
1. District 1: Joe Donnell retired.
2. District 3: Carl E. Perry retired to run for State Senate.
3. District 4: Fred Deutsch retired to run for State Senate.
4. District 4: Stephanie Sauder retired to run for State Senate.
5. District 5: Hugh Bartels was term-limited.
6. District 6: Ernie Otten retired to run for State Senate.
7. District 8: John Mills was term-limited.
8. District 9: Kenneth Teunissen retired.
9. District 11: Chris Karr was term-limited (running for State Senate).
10. District 13: Sue Peterson was term-limited (running for State Senate).
11. District 16: Kevin D. Jensen was term-limited (running for State Senate).
12. District 20: Lance Koth retired.
13. District 20: Ben Krohmer retired.
14. District 21: Rocky Blare retired.
15. District 22: Roger D. Chase was term-limited.
16. District 22: Lynn Schneider retired.
17. District 25: Randy Gross retired.
18. District 28B: Neil Pinnow retired.
19. District 29: Kirk Chaffee retired to run for State Senate.
20. District 30: Dennis Krull retired.
21. District 32: Kristin Conzet retired.

== Incumbents defeated ==
=== In primary elections ===
Six incumbent representatives, all Republicans, were defeated in the June 4 primary elections.

==== Republicans ====
1. District 1: Tamara St. John lost renomination to Logan Manhart and Christopher Reder.
2. District 5: Byron Callies lost renomination to Josephine Garcia and Matt Roby.
3. District 14: Tyler Tordsen lost renomination to Tony Kayser and Taylor Rehfeldt.
4. District 23: James Wangsness lost renomination to Spencer Gosch and Scott Moore.
5. District 29: Gary Cammack lost renomination to Terri Jorgenson and Kathy Rice.
6. District 34: Becky Drury lost renomination to Heather Baxter and Mike Derby.

=== In general election ===
One incumbent representative, a Democrat, was defeated in the November 5 general election.

==== Democrat ====
1. District 10: Kameron Nelson lost reelection to Bobbi Andera.

== Predictions ==
Source	Ranking	As of
Sabato's Crystal Ball	Safe R	October 23, 2024

== Results by district ==
=== District 1 ===
South Dakota's 1st House of Representatives District general election, 2024
Party	Candidate	Votes	%
Republican	Logan Manhart	5,946	28%
Republican	Christopher Reder	5,546	26%
Democratic	Mark Sumption	4,230	20%
Democratic	Steven D. McCleerey	4,174	19%
Libertarian	Josh Dennert	950	4%
Libertarian	Tamara Lesnar	578	3%
Total votes		21,424	100%
Republican hold			
Republican hold			

=== District 2 ===
South Dakota's 2nd House of Representatives District general election, 2024
Party	Candidate	Votes	%
Republican	David Kull (incumbent)	8,239	50%
Republican	John Sjaarda (incumbent)	8,392	50%
Total votes		16,631	100%
Republican hold			
Republican hold			

=== District 3 ===
South Dakota's 3rd House of Representatives District general election, 2024
Party	Candidate	Votes	%
Republican	Brandei Schaefbauer (incumbent)	6,049	37%
Republican	Al Novstrup	5,738	35%
Democratic	Erin R. Rudner	4,515	28%
Total votes		16,302	100%
Republican hold			
Republican hold			

=== District 4 ===
South Dakota's 4th House of Representatives District general election, 2024
Party	Candidate	Votes	%
Republican	Kent Roe	7,959	52%
Republican	Dylan C. Jordan	7,308	48%
Total votes		15,267	100%
Republican hold			
Republican hold			

=== District 5 ===
South Dakota's 5th House of Representatives District general election, 2024
Party	Candidate	Votes	%
Republican	Matt Roby	8,314	45%
Republican	Josephine Garcia	5,892	32%
Democratic	Diane M Drake	2,308	12%
Democratic	Amy D. Rambow	1,953	11%
Total votes		18,467	100%
Republican hold			
Republican hold			

=== District 6 ===
South Dakota's 6th House of Representatives District general election, 2024
Party	Candidate	Votes	%
Republican	Herman Otten	7,216	42%
Republican	Aaron Aylward (incumbent)	6,534	38%
Democratic	Garret M. Campbell	3,546	21%
Total votes			100%
Republican hold			
Republican hold			

=== District 7 ===
South Dakota's 7th House of Representatives District general election, 2024
Party	Candidate	Votes	%
Republican	Roger DeGroot (incumbent)	6,045	33%
Republican	Mellissa Heermann (incumbent)	5,666	31%
Democratic	Fedora Sutton-Butler	3,533	19%
Democratic	Blake Stevens	3,189	17%
Total votes		18,433	100%
Republican hold			
Republican hold			

=== District 8 ===
South Dakota's 8th House of Representatives District general election, 2024
Party	Candidate	Votes	%
Republican	Tim Walburg	9,282	46%
Republican	Tim Reisch (incumbent)	8,953	44%
Libertarian	Greg Zimmerman	1,958	10%
Total votes			100%
Republican hold			
Republican hold			

=== District 9 ===
South Dakota's 9th House of Representatives District general election, 2024
Party	Candidate	Votes	%
Republican	Tesa Schwans	6,560	39%
Republican	Bethany Soye (incumbent)	6,473	38%
Democratic	Beverly Froslie Johnson	4,003	23%
Total votes		17,036	100%
Republican hold			
Republican hold			

=== District 10 ===
South Dakota's 10th House of Representatives District general election, 2024
Party	Candidate	Votes	%
Democratic	Erin Healy (incumbent)	5,138	38%
Republican	Bobbi Andera	4,234	32%
Democratic	Kameron Nelson (incumbent)	4,045	30%
Total votes		13,417	100%
Democratic hold			
Republican gain from Democratic			

=== District 11 ===
South Dakota's 11th House of Representatives District general election, 2024
Party	Candidate	Votes	%
Republican	Brian Mulder (incumbent)	6,235	30%
Republican	Keri Weems	5,926	28%
Democratic	Aaron Matson	4,261	20%
Democratic	Sonja Mentzer	4,599	22%
Total votes		21,021	100%
Republican hold			
Republican hold			

=== District 12 ===
South Dakota's 12th House of Representatives District general election, 2024
Party	Candidate	Votes	%
Republican	Amber Arlint (incumbent)	6,257	31%
Republican	Greg Jamison (incumbent)	5,961	30%
Democratic	Erin Royer	4,414	22%
Democratic	JR Anderson	3,535	18%
Total votes		20,167	100%
Republican hold			
Republican hold			

=== District 13 ===
South Dakota's 13th House of Representatives District general election, 2024
Party	Candidate	Votes	%
Republican	John Hughes	7,735	52%
Republican	Tony Venhuizen	7,270	48%
Total votes		15,005	100%
Republican hold			
Republican hold			

=== District 14 ===
South Dakota's 14th House of Representatives District general election, 2024
Party	Candidate	Votes	%
Republican	Taylor Rehfeldt (incumbent)	7,833	33%
Republican	Tony Kayser	6,389	27%
Democratic	Keith Block	4,991	21%
Democratic	B.J. Motley	4,253	18%
Total votes		23,466	100%
Republican hold			
Republican hold			

=== District 15 ===
Republican Joni Tschetter requested a recount which confirmed the narrow win of Erik Muckey by 9 votes.

South Dakota's 15th House of Representatives District general election, 2024
Party	Candidate	Votes	%
Democratic	Kadyn Wittman (incumbent)	4,552	26%
Democratic	Eric Muckey	4,365	25%
Republican	Joni Tschetter	4,356	25%
Republican	Brad Lindwurm	3,917	23%
Total votes		17,190	100%
Democratic hold			
Democratic hold			

=== District 16 ===
South Dakota's 16th House of Representatives District general election, 2024
Party	Candidate	Votes	%
Republican	Karla Lems (incumbent)	7,960	44%
Republican	Richard Vasgaard	7,407	41%
Democratic	Matthew Carl Ness	2,918	16%
Total votes		18,285	100%
Republican hold			
Republican hold			

=== District 17 ===
South Dakota's 17th House of Representatives District general election, 2024
Party	Candidate	Votes	%
Republican	Chris Kassin (incumbent)	6,699	41%
Republican	William Shorma (incumbent)	5,497	33%
Democratic	Ray Ring	4,245	26%
Total votes		16,441	100%
Republican hold			
Republican hold			

=== District 18 ===
South Dakota's 18th House of Representatives District general election, 2024
Party	Candidate	Votes	%
Republican	Mike Stevens (incumbent)	6,872	36%
Republican	Julie Auch (incumbent)	6,116	32%
Democratic	Paul Harens	4,094	21%
Democratic	Sarah Mechtenberg	2,233	12%
Total votes		19,315	100%
Republican hold			
Republican hold			

=== District 19 ===
South Dakota's 19th House of Representatives District general election, 2024
Party	Candidate	Votes	%
Republican	Jessica Bahmuller (incumbent)	7,718	53%
Republican	Drew Peterson (incumbent)	6,972	47%
Total votes		14,690	100%
Republican hold			
Republican hold			

=== District 20 ===
South Dakota's 20th House of Representatives District general election, 2024
Party	Candidate	Votes	%
Republican	Jeff Bathke	6,953	54%
Republican	Kaley Nolz	6,013	46%
Total votes		12,966	100%
Republican hold			
Republican hold			

=== District 21 ===
South Dakota's 21st House of Representatives District general election, 2024
Party	Candidate	Votes	%
Republican	Marty Overweg (incumbent)	7,201	52%
Republican	Jim Halverson	6,686	48%
Total votes		13,887	100%
Republican hold			
Republican hold			

=== District 22 ===
South Dakota's 22nd House of Representatives District general election, 2024
Party	Candidate	Votes	%
Republican	Kevin Van Diepen	6,021	51%
Republican	Lana Greenfield	5,897	49%
Total votes		11,918	100%
Republican hold			
Republican hold			

=== District 23 ===
South Dakota's 23rd House of Representatives District general election, 2024
Party	Candidate	Votes	%
Republican	Spencer Gosch	7,973	52%
Republican	Scott Moore (incumbent)	7,420	48%
Total votes		15,393	100%
Republican hold			
Republican hold			

=== District 24 ===
South Dakota's 24th House of Representatives District general election, 2024
Party	Candidate	Votes	%
Republican	Will Mortenson (incumbent)	8,895	52%
Republican	Mike Weisgram (incumbent)	8,296	48%
Total votes		17,191	100%
Republican hold			
Republican hold			

=== District 25 ===
South Dakota's 25th House of Representatives District general election, 2024
Party	Candidate	Votes	%
Republican	Jon Hansen (incumbent)	8,281	53%
Republican	Les Heinemann	7,479	47%
Total votes		15,760	100%
Republican hold			
Republican hold			

=== District 26A ===
South Dakota House of Representatives District 26A general election, 2024
Party	Candidate	Votes	%
Democratic	Eric Emery (incumbent)	1,531	51%
Republican	Ron Frederick	904	30%
Independent	William Craig Lafferty	559	19%
Total votes		2,994	100%
Democratic hold			

=== District 26B ===
South Dakota House of Representatives District 26B general election, 2024
Party	Candidate	Votes	%
Republican	Rebecca Reimer (incumbent)	2,746	60%
Independent	David Reis	1,831	40%
Total votes		4,577	100%
Republican hold			

=== District 27 ===
South Dakota's 27th House of Representatives District general election, 2024
Party	Candidate	Votes	%
Republican	Liz Marty May (incumbent)	3,717	37%
Democratic	Peri Pourier (incumbent)	3,451	34%
Democratic	Elsie Meeks	2,919	29%
Total votes			100%
Republican hold			
Democratic hold			

=== District 28A ===
South Dakota House of Representatives District 28A general election, 2024
Party	Candidate	Votes	%
Republican	Jana Hunt	2,563	58%
Democratic	Carl J. Petersen	1,892	42%
Total votes		4,455	100%
Republican gain from Democratic			

=== District 28B ===
South Dakota House of Representatives District 28B general election, 2024
Party	Candidate	Votes	%
Republican	Travis Ismay	5,040	100%
Total votes		5,040	100%
Republican hold			

=== District 29 ===
South Dakota's 29th House of Representatives District general election, 2024
Party	Candidate	Votes	%
Republican	Terri Jorgenson	6,966	51%
Republican	Kathy Rice	6,615	49%
Total votes		13,581	100%
Republican hold			
Republican hold			

=== District 30 ===
South Dakota's 30th House of Representatives District general election, 2024
Party	Candidate	Votes	%
Republican	Tim Goodwin	10,094	43%
Republican	Trish Ladner (incumbent)	9,708	41%
Democratic	Susan Scheirbeck	3,872	16%
Total votes		23,674	100%
Republican hold			
Republican hold			

=== District 31 ===
South Dakota's 31st House of Representatives District general election, 2024
Party	Candidate	Votes	%
Republican	Scott Odenbach (incumbent)	9,100	38%
Republican	Mary Fitzgerald (incumbent)	7,768	32%
Independent	Victoria Greenlee	3,986	17%
Independent	Shana McVickers	3,049	13%
Total votes		23,903	100%
Republican hold			
Republican hold			

=== District 32 ===
South Dakota's 32nd House of Representatives District general election, 2024
Party	Candidate	Votes	%
Democratic	Nicole Uhre-Balk	4,133	35%
Republican	Steve Duffy (incumbent)	4,111	35%
Republican	Brook Kaufman	3,548	30%
Total votes		11,792	100%
Republican hold			
Democratic gain from Republican			

=== District 33 ===
South Dakota's 33rd House of Representatives District general election, 2024
Party	Candidate	Votes	%
Republican	Curt Massie (incumbent)	7,355	50%
Republican	Phil Jensen (incumbent)	7,325	50%
Total votes		14,680	100%
Republican hold			
Republican hold			

=== District 34 ===
South Dakota's 34th House of Representatives District general election, 2024
Party	Candidate	Votes	%
Republican	Mike Derby (incumbent)	7,108	53%
Republican	Heather Baxter	6,381	47%
Total votes		13,489	100%
Republican hold			
Republican hold			

=== District 35 ===
South Dakota's 35th House of Representatives District general election, 2024
Party	Candidate	Votes	%
Republican	Tony Randolph (incumbent)	8,778	35%
Republican	Tina Mulally (incumbent)	8,586	34%
Democratic	Pat Cromwell	4,004	16%
Democratic	Jason Lind	3,772	15%
Total votes		25,140	100%
Republican hold			
Republican hold			

== See also ==
- List of South Dakota state legislatures
