= 2018 South Dakota Senate election =

- November 6, 2018

All 35 seats in the South Dakota Senate 18 seats needed for a majority
- Turnout: 64.89%

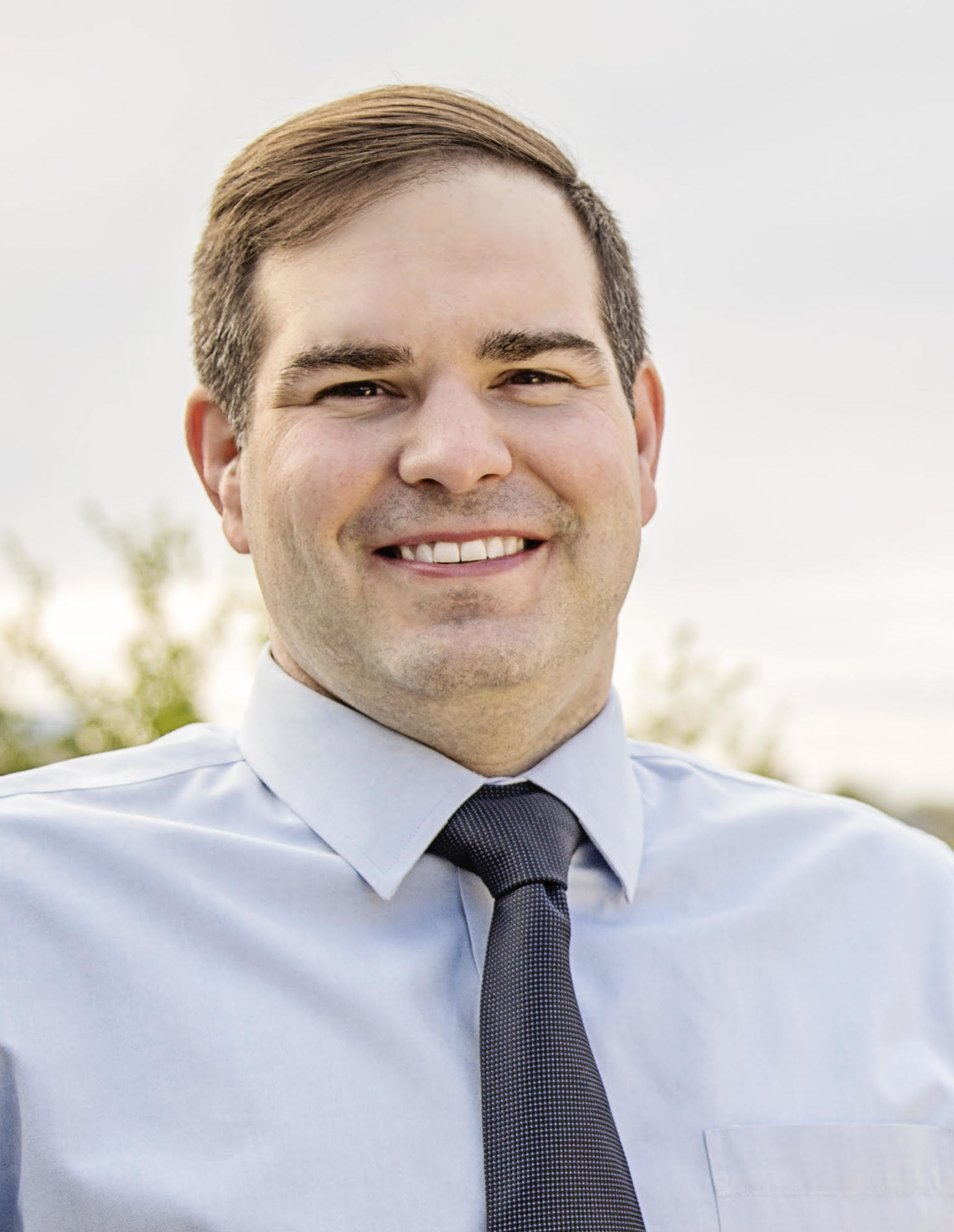
	Majority party	Minority party
Leader	Blake Curd	Billie Sutton (term-limited)
Party	Republican	Democratic
Leader since	January 10, 2017	January 5, 2015
Leader's seat	District 12	District 21
Last election	29	6
Seats after	30	5
Seat change	▲1	▼1
Majority Leader before election
Blake Curd
Republican
Elected Majority Leader
Kris Langer
Republican

The 2018 South Dakota Senate election was held on November 6, 2018, to determine which party would control the South Dakota Senate for the following two years in the 94th South Dakota Legislature. All 35 seats in the South Dakota Senate were up for election and the primary was held on June 5, 2018. Prior to the election, 29 seats were held by Republicans and 6 seats were held by Democrats. The general election saw Republicans expanding their majority in the State Senate by a single seat.

== Predictions ==
Source	Ranking	As of
Governing	Safe R	October 8, 2018

== Retirements ==
=== Democrats ===
1. District 1: Jason Frerichs was term-limited.
2. District 21: Billie Sutton was term-limited and went on to unsuccessfully run for governor of South Dakota.
3. District 27: Kevin Killer retired.

=== Republicans ===
1. District 5: Neal Tapio retired to unsuccessfully run for South Dakota's at-large congressional district.
2. District 7: Larry Tidemann was term-limited.
3. District 9: Deb Peters was term-limited.
4. District 10: Jenna Netherton resigned on April 10, 2018.
5. District 35: Terri Haverly retired.

== Closest races ==
Seats where the margin of victory was under 10%:

1. District 12, 0.28%
2. District 18, 5.32%
3. District 26, 6.08%
4. District 13, 8.34%
5. District 21, 9.26% (gain)

== Results ==
=== District 1 ===
District 1 election, 2018
Party	Candidate	Votes	%
Democratic	Susan Wismer	5,886	100.0%
Total votes		5,886	100.0%
Democratic hold			

=== District 2 ===
District 2 election, 2018
Party	Candidate	Votes	%
Republican	Brock Greenfield (incumbent)	6,574	67.21%
Democratic	Paul Register	3,207	32.79%
Total votes		9,781	100.0%
Republican hold			

=== District 3 ===
District 3 election, 2018
Party	Candidate	Votes	%
Republican	Al Novstrup (incumbent)	5,338	58.50%
Democratic	Cory Heidelberger	3,787	41.50%
Total votes		9,125	100.0%
Republican hold			

=== District 4 ===
District 4 election, 2018
Party	Candidate	Votes	%
Republican	John Wiik (incumbent)	6,500	64.84%
Democratic	Dennis Evenson	3,525	35.16%
Total votes		10,025	100.0%
Republican hold			

=== District 5 ===
District 5 election, 2018
Party	Candidate	Votes	%
Republican	Lee Schoenbeck	6,358	100.0%
Total votes		6,358	100.0%
Republican hold			

=== District 6 ===
District 6 election, 2018
Party	Candidate	Votes	%
Republican	Ernie Otten (incumbent)	6,945	65.09%
Democratic	Teresa Ann Robbins	3,725	34.91%
Total votes		10,670	100.0%
Republican hold			

=== District 7 ===
District 7 election, 2018
Party	Candidate	Votes	%
Republican	V. J. Smith	4,628	61.15%
Independent	Mary Perpich	2,940	38.85%
Total votes		7,568	100.0%
Republican hold			

=== District 8 ===
District 8 election, 2018
Party	Candidate	Votes	%
Republican	Jordan Youngberg (incumbent)	5,517	55.18%
Democratic	Scott Parsley	4,481	44.82%
Total votes		9,998	100.0%
Republican hold			

=== District 9 ===
District 9 election, 2018
Party	Candidate	Votes	%
Republican	Wayne Steinhauer	4,759	56.66%
Democratic	Laura Swier Kotelman	3,640	43.34%
Total votes		8,399	100.0%
Republican hold			

=== District 10 ===
District 10 election, 2018
Party	Candidate	Votes	%
Republican	Margaret Sutton	5,240	59.56%
Democratic	Rachel Willson	3,558	40.44%
Total votes		8,798	100.0%
Republican hold			

=== District 11 ===
District 11 election, 2018
Party	Candidate	Votes	%
Republican	Jim Stalzer (incumbent)	6,190	60.40%
Democratic	Kevin Elsing	4,058	39.60%
Total votes		10,248	100.0%
Republican hold			

=== District 12 ===
District 12 election, 2018
Party	Candidate	Votes	%
Republican	Blake Curd (incumbent)	4,872	50.14%
Democratic	Kasey Olivier	4,845	49.86%
Total votes		9,717	100.0%
Republican hold			

=== District 13 ===
District 13 election, 2018
Party	Candidate	Votes	%
Republican	Jack Kolbeck (incumbent)	6,165	54.17%
Democratic	Melissa Hiatt	5,215	45.83%
Total votes		11,380	100.0%
Republican hold			

=== District 14 ===
District 14 election, 2018
Party	Candidate	Votes	%
Republican	Deb Soholt (incumbent)	6,531	60.48%
Democratic	Justyn Hauck	4,268	39.52%
Total votes		10,799	100.0%
Republican hold			

=== District 15 ===
District 15 election, 2018
Party	Candidate	Votes	%
Democratic	Reynold Nesiba (incumbent)	3,258	100.0%
Total votes		3,258	100.0%
Democratic hold			

=== District 16 ===
District 16 election, 2018
Party	Candidate	Votes	%
Republican	Jim Bolin (incumbent)	6,815	68.52%
Democratic	Elizabeth Merrigan	3,131	31.48%
Total votes		9,946	100.0%
Republican hold			

=== District 17 ===
District 17 election, 2018
Party	Candidate	Votes	%
Republican	Arthur Rusch (incumbent)	4,953	61.16%
Democratic	Howard Grinager	3,145	38.84%
Total votes		8,098	100.0%
Republican hold			

=== District 18 ===
District 18 election, 2018
Party	Candidate	Votes	%
Democratic	Craig Kennedy (incumbent)	4,518	52.66%
Republican	Roger Meyer	4,061	47.34%
Total votes		8,579	100.0%
Democratic hold			

=== District 19 ===
District 19 election, 2018
Party	Candidate	Votes	%
Republican	Stace Nelson (incumbent)	7,531	74.03%
Democratic	Ardon Wek	2,642	25.97%
Total votes		10,173	100.0%
Republican hold			

=== District 20 ===
District 20 election, 2018
Party	Candidate	Votes	%
Republican	Joshua Klumb (incumbent)	6,606	72.49%
Democratic	Dan Miller	2,507	27.51%
Total votes		9,113	100.0%
Republican hold			

=== District 21 ===
District 21 election, 2018
Party	Candidate	Votes	%
Republican	Rocky Blare	4,918	54.63%
Democratic	Julie Bartling	4,084	45.37%
Total votes		9,002	100.0%
Republican gain from Democratic			

=== District 22 ===
District 22 election, 2018
Party	Candidate	Votes	%
Republican	Jim White (incumbent)	5,933	72.65%
Democratic	Eric Bliss	2,234	27.35%
Total votes		8,167	100.0%
Republican hold			

=== District 23 ===
District 23 election, 2018
Party	Candidate	Votes	%
Republican	Justin Cronin (incumbent)	7,869	82.57%
Democratic	Joe Yracheta	1,661	17.43%
Total votes		9,530	100.0%
Republican hold			

=== District 24 ===
District 24 election, 2018
Party	Candidate	Votes	%
Republican	Jeff Monroe (incumbent)	6,989	66.51%
Democratic	Amanda Bachmann	3,519	33.49%
Total votes		10,508	100.0%
Republican hold			

=== District 25 ===
District 25 election, 2018
Party	Candidate	Votes	%
Republican	Kris Langer (incumbent)	6,583	68.30%
Independent	Brian Wirth	1,931	20.03%
Independent	Peter Klebanoff	1,125	11.67%
Total votes		9,639	100.0%
Republican hold			

=== District 26 ===
District 26 election, 2018
Party	Candidate	Votes	%
Democratic	Troy Heinert (incumbent)	3,896	53.04%
Republican	Joel Koskan	3,450	46.96%
Total votes		7,346	100.0%
Democratic hold			

=== District 27 ===
District 27 election, 2018
Party	Candidate	Votes	%
Democratic	Red Dawn Foster	3,673	57.90%
Republican	Bill Hines	2,598	42.10%
Total votes		6,171	100.0%
Democratic hold			

=== District 28 ===
District 28 election, 2018
Party	Candidate	Votes	%
Republican	Ryan Maher (incumbent)	5,818	67.79%
Democratic	Alli Moran	2,764	32.21%
Total votes		8,582	100.0%
Republican hold			

=== District 29 ===
District 29 election, 2018
Party	Candidate	Votes	%
Republican	Gary Cammack (incumbent)	6,422	71.51%
Democratic	Matt Kammerer	2,558	28.49%
Total votes		8,980	100.0%
Republican hold			

=== District 30 ===
District 30 election, 2018
Party	Candidate	Votes	%
Republican	Lance Russell (incumbent)	6,652	56.72%
Democratic	Kristine Winter	2,943	25.09%
Libertarian	Gideon Oakes	2,134	18.19%
Total votes		11,729	100.0%
Republican hold			

=== District 31 ===
District 31 election, 2018
Party	Candidate	Votes	%
Republican	Bob Ewing (incumbent)	6,962	65.24%
Democratic	Sherry Bea Smith	3,710	34.76%
Total votes		10,672	100.0%
Republican hold			

=== District 32 ===
District 32 election, 2018
Party	Candidate	Votes	%
Republican	Alan Solano (incumbent)	5,602	62.20%
Democratic	Ayla Rodriguez	3,404	37.80%
Total votes		9,006	100.0%
Republican hold			

=== District 33 ===
District 33 election, 2018
Party	Candidate	Votes	%
Republican	Phil Jensen (incumbent)	6,655	62.35%
Democratic	Ryan Ryder	4,018	37.65%
Total votes		10,673	100.0%
Republican hold			

=== District 34 ===
District 34 election, 2018
Party	Candidate	Votes	%
Republican	Jeff Partridge (incumbent)	6,332	62.69%
Democratic	Zach VanWyk	3,769	37.31%
Total votes		10,101	100.0%
Republican hold			

=== District 35 ===
District 35 election, 2018
Party	Candidate	Votes	%
Republican	Lynne DiSanto	4,323	62.00%
Democratic	Pat Cromwell	2,650	38.00%
Total votes		6,973	100.0%
Republican hold			
