= 2026 South Dakota Amendment L =

- November 3, 2026
- 60% Vote Requirement for Constitutional Amendments Measure

Results
Choice	Votes	%
Yes	126,175	42.41%
No	171,362	57.59%
Valid votes	297,537	100.00%
Invalid or blank votes	0	0.00%
Total votes	297,537	100.00%
County results
Yes
50–60%
No
70–80%
60–70%
50–60%
Tie
50%

South Dakota Amendment L, also known as the 60% Vote Requirement for Constitutional Amendments Measure, is an legislatively referred constitutional amendment that will appear on the ballot in the U.S. state of South Dakota on November 3, 2026, concurrent with the 2026 United States elections.

== Background ==
House vote on HJR 5003
Jan 22, 2025	Party		Total votes
Jan 22, 2025	Republican	Democratic	Total votes
Yea	60	1	61
Nay	0	5	5
No vote	3	0	3
Result: Passed
Roll call vote: Representative / Party / District / Vote; Eric Emery / D / 26th–A / Nay; Jim Halverson / R / 21st / Excused; Erin Healy / D / 10th / Nay; Mellissa Heermann / R / 7th / Excused; Liz Marty May / R / 27th / Excused; Erik Muckey / D / 15th / Nay; Peri Pourier / D / 27th / Yea; Nicole Uhre-Balk / D / 32nd / Nay; Kadyn Wittman / D / 15th / Nay; All other votes are Republican yeas.

Senate vote on HJR 5003
Mar 10, 2025	Party		Total votes
Mar 10, 2025	Republican	Democratic	Total votes
Yea	29	0	29
Nay	2	2	4
No vote	1	1	2
Result: Passed
Roll call vote: Senator / Party / District / Vote; Red Dawn Foster / D / 27th / Excused; Liz Larson / D / 10th / Nay; Michael Rohl / R / 1st / Excused; Kyle Schoenfish / R / 19th / Nay; Jamie Smith / D / 10th / Nay; David Wheeler / R / 22nd / Nay; All other votes are Republican yeas.

Currently in South Dakota, constitutional amendments can be placed on the ballot by the South Dakota Legislature. Voters can approve or reject amendments if the amendment reaches 50% of votes cast. Amendment L was first placed on the ballot after it was approved by the legislature in early 2025.

== Impact ==
If approved by voters, the threshold that amendments must reach to be approved would be raised from 50% to 60%.

== Campaign ==
The Voter Defense Association of South Dakota launched a campaign against the amendment in May 2025. The president of the organization argued that raising the threshold would weaken the ballot initiative process.

On June 8, 2026 a coalition of organizations launched a new ballot committee—L NO—to defeat Amendment L, the third such attempt by the SD Legislature to raise the amendment passage threshold since 2018. Both prior attempts to do so—in 2018 and 2022—failed, the latter by a 2-to-1 margin. The coalition ballot committee's website and reasoning can be reviewed at https://www.l-no.org.

== Endorsements ==
Yes

State legislators

- John Hughes, state representative from the 13th district (2025–present) (Republican)
- 11 other state representatives
- John Carley, state senator from the 29th district (Republican)
- 7 other state senators

Organizations

- National Rifle Association of America
- Protecting South Dakota Kids
- South Dakota Family Voice Action
- South Dakota Retailers Association
- South Dakota Right to Life
