= 2020 South Dakota Senate election =

- November 3, 2020

All 35 seats in the South Dakota Senate 18 seats needed for a majority
- Turnout: 64.31%
	Majority party	Minority party
Leader	Kris Langer (retiring)	Troy Heinert
Party	Republican	Democratic
Leader's seat	25th district	26th district
Seats before	30	5
Seats won	32	3
Seat change	▲2	▼2
Popular vote	271,017	78,110
Percentage	72.83%	20.99%
- Republican gain Democratic hold Republican hold 50–60% 60–70% 70–80% 80–90% >90% 50–60%
Majority Leader before election
Kris Langer
Republican
Majority Leader
after election
Gary Cammack
Republican

Elections to the South Dakota Senate were held on November 3, 2020 as a part of the biennial elections in the U.S. state of South Dakota. Voters in 35 single-member constituencies elected members to the 93rd Senate. Elections were also held in the state for U.S. president, the U.S. Senate, the U.S. House, and the South Dakota House of Representatives.

Primary elections were held on June 2, 2020.

== Background ==
The Republican Party had been in majority control of the Senate since 1995, and had not come close to losing it since then. Although the Democratic Party held some support from urban areas and districts with a large Native American population, they had been losing seats over time; the last time Democrats held a number of seats in the double digits was 2010.

== Predictions ==
Source	Ranking	As of
The Cook Political Report	Safe R	October 21, 2020

== Results ==
=== Overview ===
Summary of the November 3, 2020 South Dakota Senate election
Party	Candidates	Votes	%	Seats		
Party	Candidates	Votes	%	Before	After	+/–
Republican	35	271,017	72.83	30	32	▲2
Democratic	17	78,110	20.99	5	3	▼2
Libertarian	7	13,938	3.75	0	0	Steady
Independent	2	9,045	2.43	0	0	Steady
Total		372,110	100.00	35	35	Steady
Registered/Turnout		578,655	64.31			
Source: South Dakota Secretary of State

Popular vote
Republican	72.83%
Democratic	20.99%
Libertarian	3.75%
Others	2.43%

Senate seats
Republican	91.43%
Democratic	8.57%

=== By district ===
District	Incumbent	Party	Elected	Party
1st	Susan Wismer	Dem	Michael H. Rohl	Rep
2nd	Brock Greenfield	Rep	Brock Greenfield	Rep
3rd	Al Novstrup	Rep	Al Novstrup	Rep
4th	John Wiik	Rep	John Wiik	Rep
5th	Lee Schoenbeck	Rep	Lee Schoenbeck	Rep
6th	Ernie Otten	Rep	Herman Otten	Rep
7th	V. J. Smith	Rep	V. J. Smith	Rep
8th	Casey Crabtree	Rep	Casey Crabtree	Rep
9th	Wayne Steinhauer	Rep	Wayne Steinhauer	Rep
10th	Margaret Sutton	Rep	Margaret Sutton	Rep
11th	Jim Stalzer	Rep	Jim Stalzer	Rep
12th	Blake Curd	Rep	Blake Curd	Rep
13th	Jack Kolbeck	Rep	Jack Kolbeck	Rep
14th	Deb Soholt	Rep	Larry Zikmund	Rep
15th	Reynold Nesiba	Dem	Reynold Nesiba	Dem
16th	Jim Bolin	Rep	Jim Bolin	Rep
17th	Arthur Rusch	Rep	Arthur Rusch	Rep
18th	Craig Kennedy	Dem	Jean Hunhoff	Rep
19th	Kyle Schoenfish	Rep	Kyle Schoenfish	Rep
20th	Joshua Klumb	Rep	Joshua Klumb	Rep
21st	Rocky Blare	Rep	Erin Tobin	Rep
22nd	Jim White	Rep	David Wheeler	Rep
23rd	John A. Lake	Rep	Bryan J. Breitling	Rep
24th	Jeff Monroe	Rep	Mary Duvall	Rep
25th	Kris Langer	Rep	Marsha Symens	Rep
26th	Troy Heinert	Dem	Troy Heinert	Dem
27th	Red Dawn Foster	Dem	Red Dawn Foster	Dem
28th	Ryan Maher	Rep	Ryan Maher	Rep
29th	Gary Cammack	Rep	Gary Cammack	Rep
30th	Lance Russell	Rep	Julie Frye-Mueller	Rep
31st	Bob Ewing	Rep	Timothy Johns	Rep
32nd	Helene Duhamel	Rep	Helene Duhamel	Rep
33rd	Phil Jensen	Rep	David Johnson	Rep
34th	Jeffrey Partridge	Rep	Michael Diedrich	Rep
35th	Jessica Castleberry	Rep	Jessica Castleberry	Rep

=== Close races ===
Districts where the margin of victory was under 10%:

1. District 26, 5.68%
2. District 12, 8.14%
3. District 15, 9.50%

Red denotes races won by Republicans. Blue denotes races won by Democrats.

== Election results ==
=== District 1 ===
South Dakota Senate District 1 general election
Party	Candidate	Votes	%
Republican	Michael H. Rohl	6,051	55.19%
Democratic	Susan Wismer (Incumbent)	4,913	44.81%
Total votes		10,964	100%
Republican gain from Democratic			

=== District 2 ===
South Dakota Senate District 2 general election
Party	Candidate	Votes	%
Republican	Brock L. Greenfield (Incumbent)	8,154	100%
Total votes		8,154	100%
Republican hold			

=== District 3 ===
South Dakota Senate District 3 general election
Party	Candidate	Votes	%
Republican	Al Novstrup (Incumbent)	7,496	100%
Total votes		7,496	100%
Republican hold			

=== District 4 ===
South Dakota Senate District 4 general election
Party	Candidate	Votes	%
Republican	John Wiik (Incumbent)	9,538	82.62%
Libertarian	Daryl Root	2,007	17.38%
Total votes		11,545	100%
Republican hold			

=== District 5 ===
South Dakota Senate District 5 general election
Party	Candidate	Votes	%
Republican	Lee Schoenbeck (Incumbent)	8,272	79.04%
Libertarian	Adam Jewell	2,193	20.96%
Total votes		10,465	100%
Republican hold			

=== District 6 ===
South Dakota Senate District 6 general election
Party	Candidate	Votes	%
Republican	Herman Otten	10,194	66.74%
Democratic	Nancy Kirstein	5,081	33.26%
Total votes		15,275	100
Republican hold			

=== District 7 ===
South Dakota Senate District 7 general election
Party	Candidate	Votes	%
Republican	V.J. Smith (Incumbent)	6,650	100%
Total votes		6,650	100%
Republican hold			

=== District 8 ===
South Dakota Senate District 8 general election
Party	Candidate	Votes	%
Republican	Casey Crabtree (Incumbent)	7,829	100%
Total votes		7,829	100%
Republican hold			

=== District 9 ===
South Dakota Senate District 9 general election
Party	Candidate	Votes	%
Republican	Wayne H. Steinhauer (Incumbent)	7,654	57.96%
Democratic	Suzanne "Suzie" Jones Pranger	5,552	42.04%
Total votes		13,206	100%
Republican hold			

=== District 10 ===
South Dakota Senate District 10 general election
Party	Candidate	Votes	%
Republican	Maggie Sutton (Incumbent)	7,205	100%
Total votes		7,205	100%
Republican hold			

=== District 11 ===
South Dakota Senate District 11 general election
Party	Candidate	Votes	%
Republican	Jim Stalzer (Incumbent)	8,244	60.47%
Democratic	Tom Cool	5,389	39.53%
Total votes		13,633	100%
Republican hold			

=== District 12 ===
South Dakota Senate District 12 general election
Party	Candidate	Votes	%
Republican	R Blake Curd (Incumbent)	6,599	54.07%
Democratic	Jessica Meyers	5,606	45.93%
Total votes		12,205	100%
Republican hold			

=== District 13 ===
South Dakota Senate District 13 general election
Party	Candidate	Votes	%
Republican	Jack Kolbeck (Incumbent)	7,490	56.28%
Democratic	Elizabeth "Liz" Larson	5,819	43.72%
Total votes		13,309	100%
Republican hold			

=== District 14 ===
South Dakota Senate District 14 general election
Party	Candidate	Votes	%
Republican	Larry P. Zikmund	7,391	56.00%
Democratic	Timothy Reed	5,808	44.00%
Total votes		13,199	100%
Republican hold			

=== District 15 ===
South Dakota Senate District 15 general election
Party	Candidate	Votes	%
Democratic	Reynold F. Nesiba (Incumbent)	4,127	54.75%
Republican	Thor Bardon	3,411	45.25%
Total votes		7,538	100%
Democratic hold			

=== District 16 ===
South Dakota Senate District 16 general election
Party	Candidate	Votes	%
Republican	David L. Anderson (Incumbent)	8,383	100%
Total votes		8,383	100%
Republican hold			

=== District 17 ===
South Dakota Senate District 17 general election
Party	Candidate	Votes	%
Republican	Arthur Rusch (Incumbent)	6,285	63.87%
Democratic	Ailee Johns	3,122	31.72%
Libertarian	Gregory Baldwin	434	4.41%
Total votes		9,841	100%
Republican hold			

=== District 18 ===
South Dakota Senate District 18 general election
Party	Candidate	Votes	%
Republican	Jean Hunhoff	6,341	59.85%
Democratic	Jordan Foos	4,255	40.15%
Total votes		10,597	100%
Republican gain from Democratic			

=== District 19 ===
South Dakota Senate District 19 general election
Party	Candidate	Votes	%
Republican	Kyle Schoenfish (Incumbent)	9,766	100%
Total votes		9,766	100%
Republican hold			

=== District 20 ===
South Dakota Senate District 20 general election
Party	Candidate	Votes	%
Republican	Joshua Klumb (Incumbent)	8,516	85.09%
Libertarian	Alexander Martin	1,492	14.91%
Total votes		10,008	100%
Republican hold			

=== District 21 ===
South Dakota Senate District 21 general election
Party	Candidate	Votes	%
Republican	Erin Tobin	7,629	79.21%
Democratic	Dan Kerner Andersson	2,002	20.79%
Total votes		9,631	100%
Republican hold			

=== District 22 ===
South Dakota Senate District 22 general election
Party	Candidate	Votes	%
Republican	David Wheeler	7,397	100%
Total votes		7,397	100%
Republican hold			

=== District 23 ===
South Dakota Senate District 23 general election
Party	Candidate	Votes	%
Republican	Bryan J. Breitling	9,519	89.56%
Libertarian	CJ Abernathey	1,110	10.44%
Total votes		10,629	100%
Republican hold			

=== District 24 ===
South Dakota Senate District 24 general election
Party	Candidate	Votes	%
Republican	Mary Duvall	9,254	100%
Total votes		9,254	100%
Republican hold			

=== District 25 ===
South Dakota Senate District 25 general election
Party	Candidate	Votes	%
Republican	Marsha Symens	7,580	58.86%
Independent	Rick W Knobe	4,205	32.65%
Independent	Seth William Van't Hof	1,093	8.49%
Total votes		12,878	100%
Republican hold			

=== District 26 ===
South Dakota Senate District 26 general election
Party	Candidate	Votes	%
Democratic	Troy Heinert (Incumbent)	4,416	52.84%
Republican	Joel Koskan	3,941	47.16%
Total votes		8,357	100%
Democratic hold			

=== District 27 ===
South Dakota Senate District 27 general election
Party	Candidate	Votes	%
Democratic	Red Dawn Foster (Incumbent)	3,829	56.25%
Republican	Judd W Schomp	2,978	43.75%
Total votes		6,807	100%
Democratic hold			

=== District 28 ===
South Dakota Senate District 28 general election
Party	Candidate	Votes	%
Republican	Ryan M. Maher (Incumbent)	7,506	100%
Total votes		7,506	100%
Republican hold			

=== District 29 ===
South Dakota Senate District 29 general election
Party	Candidate	Votes	%
Republican	Gary L. Cammack (Incumbent)	9,350	77.88%
Libertarian	Kent Wilsey	2,656	22.12%
Total votes		12,006	100%
Republican hold			

=== District 30 ===
South Dakota Senate District 30 general election
Party	Candidate	Votes	%
Republican	Julie Frye-Mueller	10,043	71.28%
Libertarian	A. Gideon Oakes	4,046	28.72%
Total votes		14,089	100%
Republican hold			

=== District 31 ===
South Dakota Senate District 31 general election
Party	Candidate	Votes	%
Republican	Timothy R. Johns	9,911	100%
Total votes		9,911	100%
Republican hold			

=== District 32 ===
South Dakota Senate District 32 general election
Party	Candidate	Votes	%
Republican	Helene Duhamel (Incumbent)	7,397	64.10%
Democratic	Michael Calabrese	4,143	35.90%
Total votes		11,540	100%
Republican hold			

=== District 33 ===
South Dakota Senate District 33 general election
Party	Candidate	Votes	%
Republican	David Johnson	11,369	68.13%
Democratic	Ryan A. Ryder	5,317	31.87%
Total votes		16,686	100%
Republican hold			

=== District 34 ===
South Dakota Senate District 34 general election
Party	Candidate	Votes	%
Republican	Michael G Diedrich	8,079	64.38%
Democratic	George Nelson	4,470	35.62%
Total votes		12,549	100%
Republican hold			

=== District 35 ===
South Dakota Senate District 35 general election
Party	Candidate	Votes	%
Republican	Jessica Castleberry (Incumbent)	6,012	61.60%
Democratic	Brian Gentry	3,747	38.40%
Total votes		9,759	100%
Republican hold			

== See also ==
- 2020 South Dakota elections
- 2020 United States state legislative elections
