= Shawn Bordeaux =

American politician

Member of the South Dakota Senate from the 26th district
- In office January 10, 2023 – January 14, 2025
- Preceded by: Troy Heinert
- Succeeded by: Tamara Grove

Member of the South Dakota House of Representatives from the 26A district
- In office 2015 – January 10, 2023 Serving with: James Schaffer (January 2015 – May 2018); Rebecca Reimer (August 2018 – January 2023)
- Preceded by: Troy Heinert
- Succeeded by: Eric Emery

Personal details
- Born: June 9, 1967 (age 59) Mission, South Dakota, U.S.
- Party: Democratic
- Children: 1
- Education: University of Nebraska–Lincoln
- Profession: Economic and community development

Shawn L. Bordeaux (born June 9, 1967) is an American politician. He served as a Democratic member for the 26th district in the South Dakota Senate from 2023 to 2025. From 2015 to 2023, Bordeaux served in the South Dakota House of Representatives.

Bordeaux is a Sicangu Lakota from Rosebud.
