= Ali Rae Horsted =

American politician

Member-elect of the South Dakota House of Representatives from the 13th district
- Assuming office January 12, 2027
- Succeeding: John Hughes

Personal details
- Party: Democratic

Ali Rae Horsted is an American politician who is the representative-elect for the 13th district in the South Dakota House of Representatives. She is a member of the Democratic Party.
