= Evangeline Poor Bear =

Oglala politician

Member-elect of the South Dakota House of Representatives from the 27th district
- Assuming office January 12, 2027
- Succeeding: Peri Pourier

Personal details
- Party: Independent (Note: Although elected as an independent, Poor Bear aligns with the Republican Party.)

Evangeline Poor Bear is an Oglala politician who is the representative-elect for the 27th district in the South Dakota House of Representatives. Although she aligns with the Republican Party, she was elected to the Legislature as an independent, the first since 2010. Poor Bear resides in Pine Ridge.

== See also ==
- List of Native American politicians
- Native American women in politics

== Notes and references ==
Notes
