= Angi Hanzlik =

American politician

Member-elect of the South Dakota House of Representatives from the 26B district
- Assuming office January 2027
- Succeeding: Rebecca Reimer

Personal details
- Party: Republican

Angi Hanzlik is an American politician. A member of the Republican Party, she is the member-elect for the 26B district of the South Dakota House of Representatives.
