= Tyler Tordsen =

American politician

Member of the South Dakota House of Representatives from the 14th district
- In office January 10, 2023 – January 14, 2025 Serving with Taylor Rehfeldt
- Succeeded by: Tony Kayser

Personal details
- Party: Republican

Tyler Tordsen is an American politician. He served as a member of the South Dakota House of Representatives from the 14th district from 2023 to 2025, alongside Taylor Rehfeldt. He is a member of the Republican Party.
