= Dale Bartscher =

American politician

Member of the South Dakota House of Representatives from the 35th district
- Incumbent
- Assumed office January 2027

Personal details
- Party: Republican

Dale Bartscher is an American politician. A member of the Republican Party, he is the member-elect for the 35th district of the South Dakota House of Representatives.
