= Larry Lucas =

American politician

Member of the South Dakota House of Representatives from the 26A district
- In office 2007–2014

Personal details
- Born: January 10, 1951 (age 75) Platte, South Dakota
- Party: Democratic
- Spouse: Debera
- Education: South Dakota State University
- Profession: Educator, sales technician

Larry James Lucas was a Democratic former member of the South Dakota House of Representatives, representing the 26A district since 2007. He previously served from 1991 through 2000.
