= Chris Reder =

American politician

Member of the South Dakota House of Representatives from the 1st district
- In office January 14, 2025 – May 1, 2025
- Succeeded by: Nick Fosness

Personal details
- Party: Republican

Christopher Reder is an American politician. He represented the 1st district in the South Dakota House of Representatives from January to May 2025. A member of the Republican Party, he resigned on May 1, 2025, after questions regarding his residency were raised.
