= Daniel Kjos =

American politician

Member-elect of the South Dakota House of Representatives from the 1st district
- Assuming office January 12, 2027
- Succeeding: Logan Manhart

Personal details
- Party: Republican

Daniel Kjos is an American politician who is the representative-elect for the 1st district in the South Dakota House of Representatives. A member of the Republican Party, he previously served as a commissioner for Day County.
