= Elliott Neff =

American politician

Member of the South Dakota House of Representatives from the 6th district
- Incumbent
- Assumed office January 2027

Personal details
- Party: Republican

Elliott Neff is an American politician. A member of the Republican Party, he is the member-elect for the 6th district of the South Dakota House of Representatives. Neff is also an avid chess player, having achieved the USCF title of National Master.
