= John Shubeck =

American politician

Member of the South Dakota House of Representatives from the 16th district
- Incumbent
- Assumed office September 17, 2025 Serving with Karla Lems
- Preceded by: Richard Vasgaard

Personal details
- Party: Republican

John Shubeck is an American politician. He has served as a member of the South Dakota House of Representatives from the 16th district, since September 2025. He was appointed by Larry Rhoden, the governor of South Dakota, following the death of Richard Vasgaard in August. Shubeck is a member of the Republican Party.

Shubeck is a farmer and veteran.
