= Ben Krohmer =

American politician

Member of the South Dakota House of Representatives from the 20th district
- Incumbent
- Assumed office January 10, 2023 Serving with Lance Koth

Personal details
- Party: Republican

Ben Krohmer is an American politician. He has served as a member of the South Dakota House of Representatives from the 20th district since 2023, alongside Lance Koth. He is a member of the Republican Party.
