= Tony Venhuizen =

American politician (born 1982)

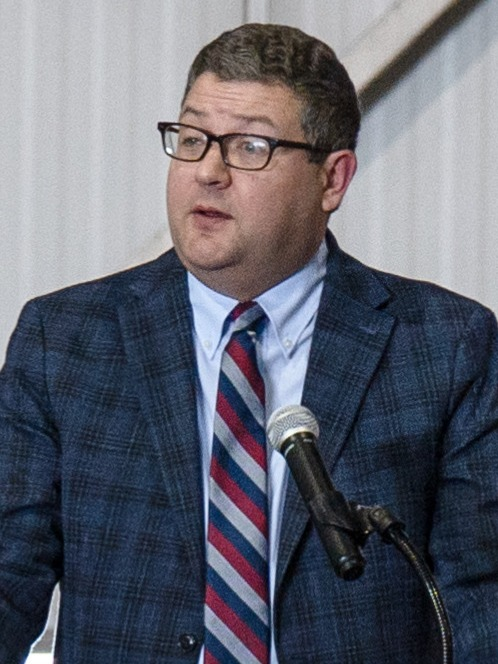
- Venhuizen in 2025

40th Lieutenant Governor of South Dakota
- Incumbent
- Assumed office January 30, 2025
- Governor: Larry Rhoden
- Preceded by: Larry Rhoden

Member of the South Dakota House of Representatives from the 13th district
- In office January 10, 2023 – January 29, 2025
- Preceded by: Richard Thomason
- Succeeded by: Jack Kolbeck

Personal details
- Born: Tonnis Henry Venhuizen; October 8, 1982 (age 44) Armour, South Dakota, U.S.
- Party: Republican
- Spouse: Sara Daugaard (m. 2004)
- Children: 3
- Relatives: Dennis Daugaard (father-in-law)
- Education: South Dakota State University (BS); University of South Dakota (JD)

Tonnis Henry Venhuizen (born October 8, 1982) is an American politician and attorney who has served as the 40th lieutenant governor of South Dakota since 2025. A member of the Republican Party, he previously served as a member of the South Dakota House of Representatives from the 13th district, alongside Sue Peterson, from 2023 to 2025. He was also the chief of staff to two governors of South Dakota: Dennis Daugaard, his father-in-law, and Kristi Noem.

In January 2025, he was selected by Governor Larry Rhoden to serve as the lieutenant governor of South Dakota. He was unanimously confirmed by the Senate and House two days after his appointment and was sworn in on January 30.

== Early life and education (1982–2008) ==
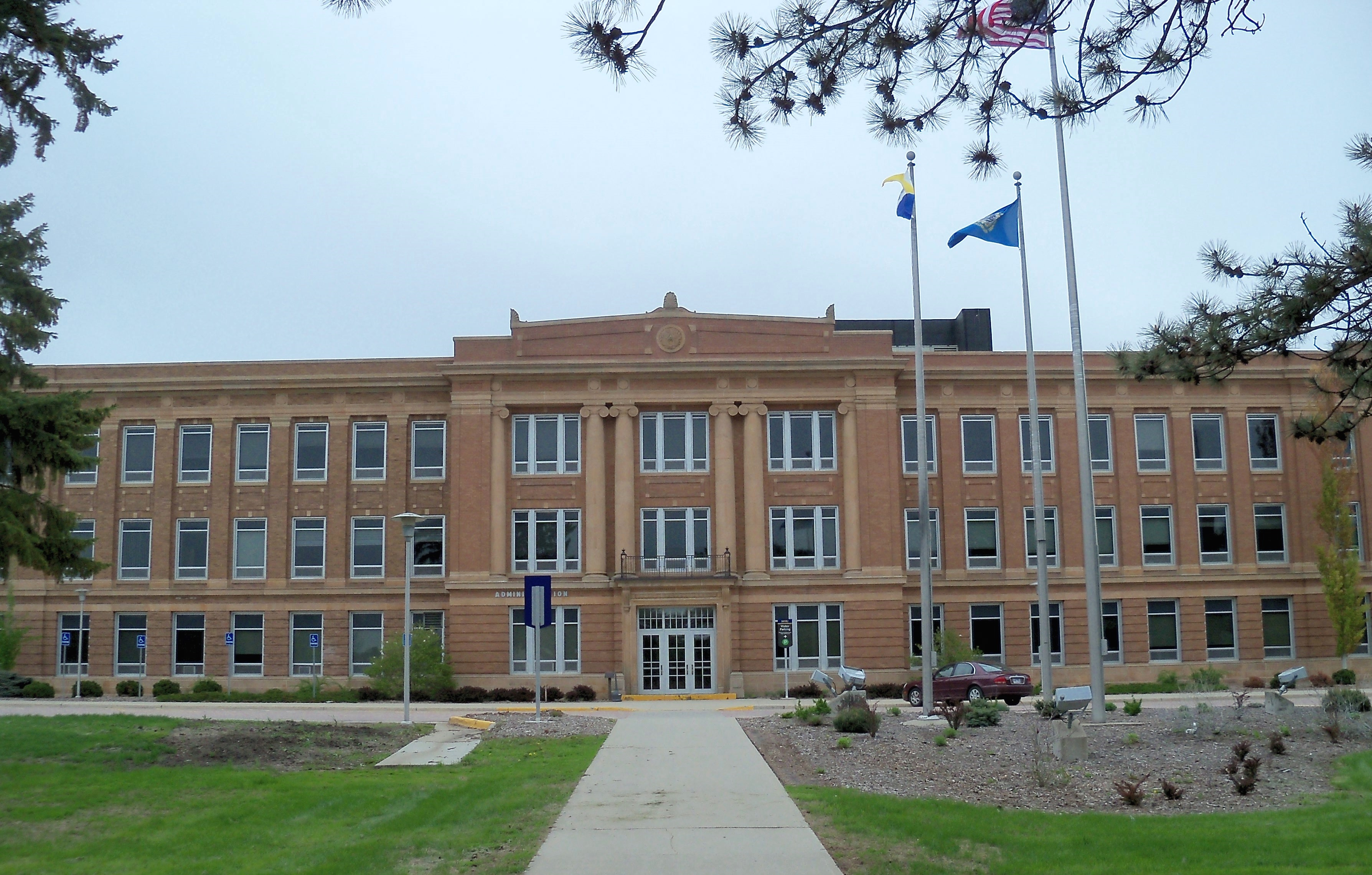
South Dakota State University, where Venhuizen studied (pictured in 2013)

Tonnis Henry Venhuizen was born on October 8, 1982, at the Douglas County Memorial Hospital in Armour, South Dakota. His father, Keith, is a dentist and was a school board member for a decade. Venhuizen's maternal grandfather, Henry Poppen, served as a Republican member of the South Dakota Senate from 1967 to 1992. Venhuizen graduated from Armour High School in 2001, where he was included in the National Merit Scholar. In eleventh grade, Venhuizen served as a page at the Senate, where he met Dennis Daugaard, then a state legislator, and his daughter, Sara. Later, at the 2002 convention for the South Dakota Republican Party, Venhuizen met Sara again and the two began dating, marrying in 2004. Together, they have three children.

In 2002, Venhuizen was an employee for the gubernatorial campaign of Mike Rounds. Initially seen as a long-shot candidate, Rounds emerged as the winner in an upset victory and served as governor of South Dakota. Venhuizen helped establish Rounds's office in Rapid City and, at the request of Rounds, remained an employee through the transition. In June 2003, Rounds appointed Venhuizen to the South Dakota Board of Regents. He was reappointed the following year. In 2005, he received a Bachelor of Science degree from South Dakota State University, double majoring in political science and history. There, he was a recipient of the Harry S. Truman Scholarship. In 2008, he earned a Juris Doctor from the University of South Dakota School of Law.

== Career ==
=== Clerkship and chief of staff (2008–2021) ===
After graduating from law school, Venhuizen passed the bar exam in August 2008. He was employed as a law clerk for a year for the First Judicial Circuit of South Dakota. The employment expired in August 2009; he was later chosen as the gubernatorial campaign manager of Daugaard. Following Daugaard's victory in the 2010 election, he selected Venhuizen as director of policy and communications on November 22 of that year. The nomination received criticism from the executive director of the South Dakota Democratic Party, who accused Daugaard of nepotism. Throughout Daugaard's governorship, Venhuizen served as a senior advisor. In November 2014, Venhuizen was selected to be Daugaard's chief of staff, succeeding Dusty Johnson. Venhuizen served in that position for four years. Governor Kristi Noem appointed Venhuizen as her chief of staff in March 2020. He had previously worked as a senior advisor for Noem before resigning in June 2019 to work at a law firm in Sioux Falls. He left his post as chief of staff on April 23, 2021, after Noem appointed him to the South Dakota Board of Regents.

=== South Dakota House of Representatives (2023–2025) ===
On February 8, 2022, Venhuizen announced his candidacy for the South Dakota House of Representatives, aiming to represent the 13th district. He won the primary alongside incumbent Sue Peterson; the two faced no opposition in the general election. Venhuizen resigned from his position on the Board of Regents and was inaugurated as a state representative on January 10, 2023. In early 2023, Venhuizen proposed House Bill 1055, which would increase the amount of money awarded from the South Dakota Opportunity Scholarship from $6,500 to $7,500. HB 1055 passed the House on February 16, 2023, in a 62–8 vote. It was then passed by the Senate on March 1, 2023, in a 30–4 vote and signed by Noem on March 23, 2023.

In December 2023, Venhuizen introduced a resolution alongside Casey Crabtree that would allow voters to decide if work requirements should be considered for those enrolled in the Medicaid government program. The resolution was adopted by the South Dakota State Legislature and, as Amendment F, was passed by South Dakota voters in the 2024 general election. A similar resolution, also introduced by Venhuizen, earlier in the year was struck down by a South Dakota Senate committee due to its broad language. In December 2024, Venhuizen proposed a bill that would increase the state's sales tax rate to 5% and provide property tax relief to homeowners. Its primary sponsor in the Senate was Randy Deibert. Rhoden stated in February 2025 that, while changes to state property taxes was a top priority, the bill proposed by Venhuizen was not the dominant solution; however, he said that it "was a good discussion piece" and "made things real for people to realize just how significant the problem is and to look for more appropriate solutions."

=== Lieutenant Governor of South Dakota (2025–present) ===
On January 25, 2025, Noem resigned from her post as governor after being confirmed by the United States Senate to serve as the secretary of homeland security. The lieutenant governor, Larry Rhoden, succeeded her. Four days after taking office, Rhoden nominated Venhuizen to serve as lieutenant governor. Shortly before the announcement, Venhuizen had resigned from his seat in the House. That same day, Venhuizen's nomination was approved in a 5–0 vote by the Senate Select Committee on the Nomination for Lieutenant Governor. On January 30, both the Senate and House unanimously confirmed his appointment and Venhuizen was sworn in as the 40th lieutenant governor of South Dakota.

Political offices
Preceded by Larry Rhoden	Lieutenant Governor of South Dakota; 2025–present	Incumbent
