= Kathleen Brudvig =

American politician

Member of the South Dakota House of Representatives from the 10th district
- Incumbent
- Assumed office January 2027

Personal details
- Party: Democratic

Kathleen Brudvig is an American politician. A member of the Democratic Party, she is the member-elect for the 10th district of the South Dakota House of Representatives.
