= Tamara Grove =

American politician

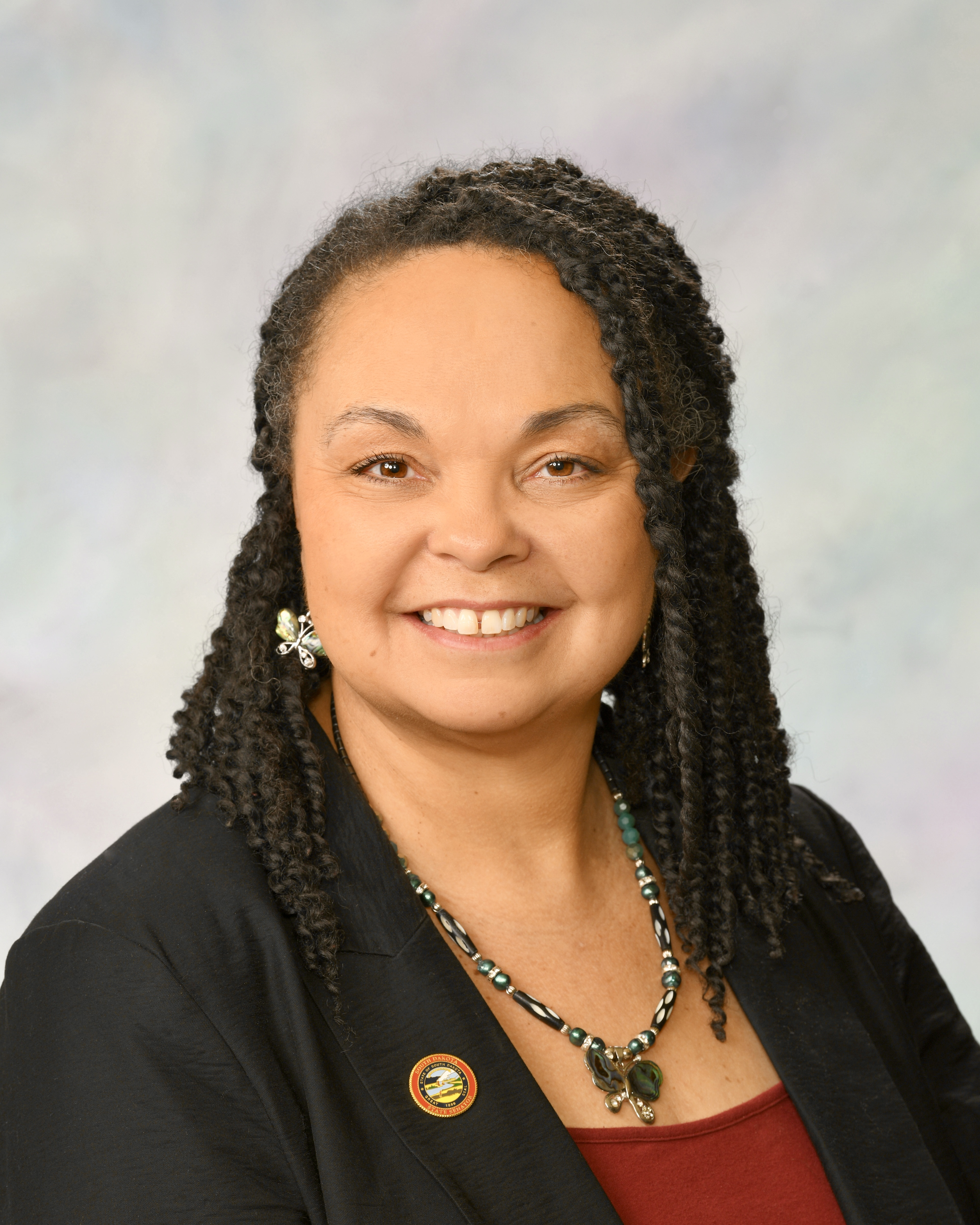

Member of the South Dakota Senate from the 26th district
- Incumbent
- Assumed office January 14, 2025
- Preceded by: Shawn Bordeaux

Personal details
- Born: June 1, 1970 (age 56) Yankton, South Dakota, U.S.
- Party: Republican
- Education: Huron University (BS, MBA); Colorado Technical University (DM)
- Website: Campaign website

Tamara R. Grove (born June 1, 1970) is an American politician. She serves as a Republican member for the 26th district in the South Dakota State Senate since 2025. The district is based in south central South Dakota and includes Brule, Buffalo, Hughes, Hyde, Jones, Lyman, Mellette, and Todd Counties.

== Biography ==
Grove was adopted as a baby in August 1970, during the Indian Adoption Project. She was raised in Miller, South Dakota.

Grove lived with her husband for 30 years in Sioux Falls, before moving to Lower Brule. Grove and her husband have collaborated with community members on issues like drug and alcohol recovery, children's educational programs, and food sovereignty. They also serve on the Lower Brule Health and Wellness Board, which works to improve the health of Native people in Lower Brule and across the state.

Grove is an advocate of drug reform and rehabilitation for those most impacted by substance use disorders. In her first session, she worked to end the state's archaic ingestion law, which penalized first-time offenses as felonies.

Prior to her time in office, she was a researcher for the First Step Act after the 2016 United States presidential election. Grove worked directly with President Donald Trump’s Urban Revitalization Coalition and was the lead co-author for his 13-Point Urban Revitalization Plan. Locally she worked for the anti-cannabis group Protecting South Dakota Kids in 2024 legislative session.

Senator Tamara Grove is South Dakota's first African American female elected to the South Dakota Senate in legislative history. She ran for South Dakota's 26th legislative district in 2024, beating incumbent Democratic Senator Shawn Bordeaux on Election Night 2024. She defeated him with a tally of 57%-43%. She is the first Republican elected to represent the 26th district in nearly two decades.

In 2025, Senator Grove passed a resolution calling for the rescission of the Dakota Removal Act, a law that currently banishes Dakota/Lakota from Minnesota. She also brought a bill that would require Native history be taught in SD schools. When introducing this bill, Grove said, "This is a step towards a reset that tribal leaders have called for in the wake of strained relations with former Gov. Kristi Noem."
