= Troy Heinert =

American politician

Minority Leader of the South Dakota Senate
- In office January 8, 2019 – January 10, 2023
- Preceded by: Billie Sutton
- Succeeded by: Reynold Nesiba

Member of the South Dakota Senate from the 26th district
- In office January 2015 – January 2023
- Preceded by: Larry Lucas
- Succeeded by: Shawn Bordeaux

Member of the South Dakota House of Representatives from the 26th district
- In office January 2013 – January 2015
- Preceded by: Larry Lucas
- Succeeded by: Shawn Bordeaux

Personal details
- Born: Troy Everett Heinert; July 29, 1972 (age 53) Spearfish, South Dakota, U.S.
- Party: Democratic
- Spouse: Gena Heinert
- Education: Sinte Gleska University (BA)

Troy Heinert (born July 29, 1972) is an American politician who served in the South Dakota Senate.

Elected to the Senate in 2014, he was elected in 2015 as Senate assistant minority leader. He was elected minority leader in 2018. He was first elected to the state house in 2012 and served for one term.

== Early life and education ==
Heinert was born in Spearfish, South Dakota. He grew up on a ranch. His father died when he was 12, but he was taken under the wing of a close family friend. He attended local schools, where he graduated with a BS degree in education. He is a member of the Rosebud Sioux Tribe.

== Career ==
Heinert started work as an elementary school teacher, working also as a wrestling coach.

He first ran for electoral office on the Todd County High School Board, winning a seat and serving for 3 years.

Heinert and his wife in 2007 became owners of Chute 2, a bar and restaurant attached to the Prairie View country club in Mission. He became close to Jim Korkow, who was friends with his father, especially after his father's death. Korkow has acted as a father to him.

In 2012, Heinert was elected as a Democrat to the South Dakota House of Representatives from District 26A, comprising Todd and Mellette counties.

In 2014, Heinert was elected to the state senate.

He was succeeded in the house from District 26A by Shawn Bordeaux also of Mission.

== Personal life ==
He married Gena and they have two sons and a daughter. They lived in Mission, South Dakota.

South Dakota Senate
Preceded by Billie Sutton	Minority Leader of the South Dakota Senate; 2019–2023	Succeeded by Reynold Nesiba
