= Kaley Nolz =

American politician

Member of the South Dakota House of Representatives from the 20th district
- Incumbent
- Assumed office January 14, 2025 Serving with Jeff Bathke

Personal details
- Born: September 24, 1996 (age 29)
- Party: Republican

Kaley Nolz (born September 24, 1996) is an American politician. She serves as a Republican member for the 20th district in the South Dakota House of Representatives since 2025. Her district contains the city of Mitchell, South Dakota. Nolz was South Dakota Beef Ambassador. She retired at the 2026 election after one term.
