= South Dakota's 27th legislative district =

American legislative district

South Dakota's 27th State Senate district

South Dakota's 27th legislative district is one of 35 districts in the South Dakota Legislature. Each district elects one senator and two representatives. In the state senate, it has been represented by Democrat Red Dawn Foster since 2019. In the state house, it has been represented by Republican Liz May since 2021 and Democrat turned Republican Peri Pourier since 2019.

== Geography ==
Located in southwestern South Dakota, the district contains Bennett, Jackson, Pennington, and Oglala Lakota counties. Within it is the Pine Ridge Indian Reservation.
