= Nick Fosness =

American politician

Member of the South Dakota House of Representatives from the 1st district
- Incumbent
- Assumed office August 5, 2025 Serving with Logan Manhart
- Preceded by: Chris Reder

Personal details
- Party: Republican

Nick Fosness is an American politician. He has served as a member of the South Dakota House of Representatives from the 1st district, alongside Logan Manhart, since August 2025. He was appointed by Larry Rhoden, the governor of South Dakota, following the resignation of Chris Reder in May. Fosness is a member of the Republican Party.
