= Tesa Schwans =

American politician

Member of the South Dakota House of Representatives from the 9th district
- Incumbent
- Assumed office January 14, 2025 Serving with Bethany Soye

Personal details
- Born: August 2, 1970 (age 55) McLaughlin, South Dakota
- Party: Republican

Tesa Schwans (born August 2, 1970) is an American politician. She serves as a Republican member for the 9th district in the South Dakota House of Representatives since 2025. The district includes the city of Hartford and the north-western part of Sioux Falls. Schwans works is a hairstylist by profession.
