= South Dakota's 26th legislative district =

American legislative district

South Dakota's 26th State Senate district

South Dakota's 26th legislative district is one of 35 districts in the South Dakota Legislature. Each district elects one senator and two representatives. The 26th and 28th districts are unusual, as they are the only ones do not elect both House members at-large. The 26th is subdivided into 2 sub-districts, 26A and 26B, which each elect their own representative to the House.

In the state senate, it has been represented by Republican Tamara Grove since 2025.

== 26A ==
State house district 26A

In the House, 26A has been represented by Democrat Eric Emery since 2023.

Located in southern South Dakota, the sub-district contains Jones, Mellette, and Todd counties. Within it is the Rosebud Indian Reservation, home of the Rosebux Sioux tribe.

== 26B ==
State house district 26B

In the House, 26B has been represented by Republican Rebecca Reimer since 2018.

Located in central South Dakota, the sub-district contains Brule, Buffalo, Hughes, Hyde, Jones, and Lyman counties. Within it are the Lower Brule and Crow Creek reservations.
