= Tony Kayser =

American politician

Member of the South Dakota House of Representatives from the 14th district
- Incumbent
- Assumed office January 14, 2025 Serving with Taylor Rehfeldt

Personal details
- Born: May 5, 1960 (age 66) Alexandria, South Dakota
- Party: Republican
- Website: tonykayserforsd.com

Tony Kayser (born May 5, 1960) is an American politician. He serves as a Republican member for the 14th district in the South Dakota House of Representatives since 2025. His district is located in the eastern part of Sioux Falls, South Dakota.
