= Jeff Bathke =

American politician

Member of the South Dakota House of Representatives from the 20th district
- Incumbent
- Assumed office January 14, 2025 Serving with Kaley Nolz

Personal details
- Born: Mitchell, South Dakota
- Party: Republican
- Education: University of South Dakota

Jeff Bathke is an American politician. He serves as a Republican member for the 20th district in the South Dakota House of Representatives since 2025. His district contains the city of Mitchell, South Dakota. Bathke had a previous career at the South Dakota Department of Corrections.
