= Kathy Rice =

American politician

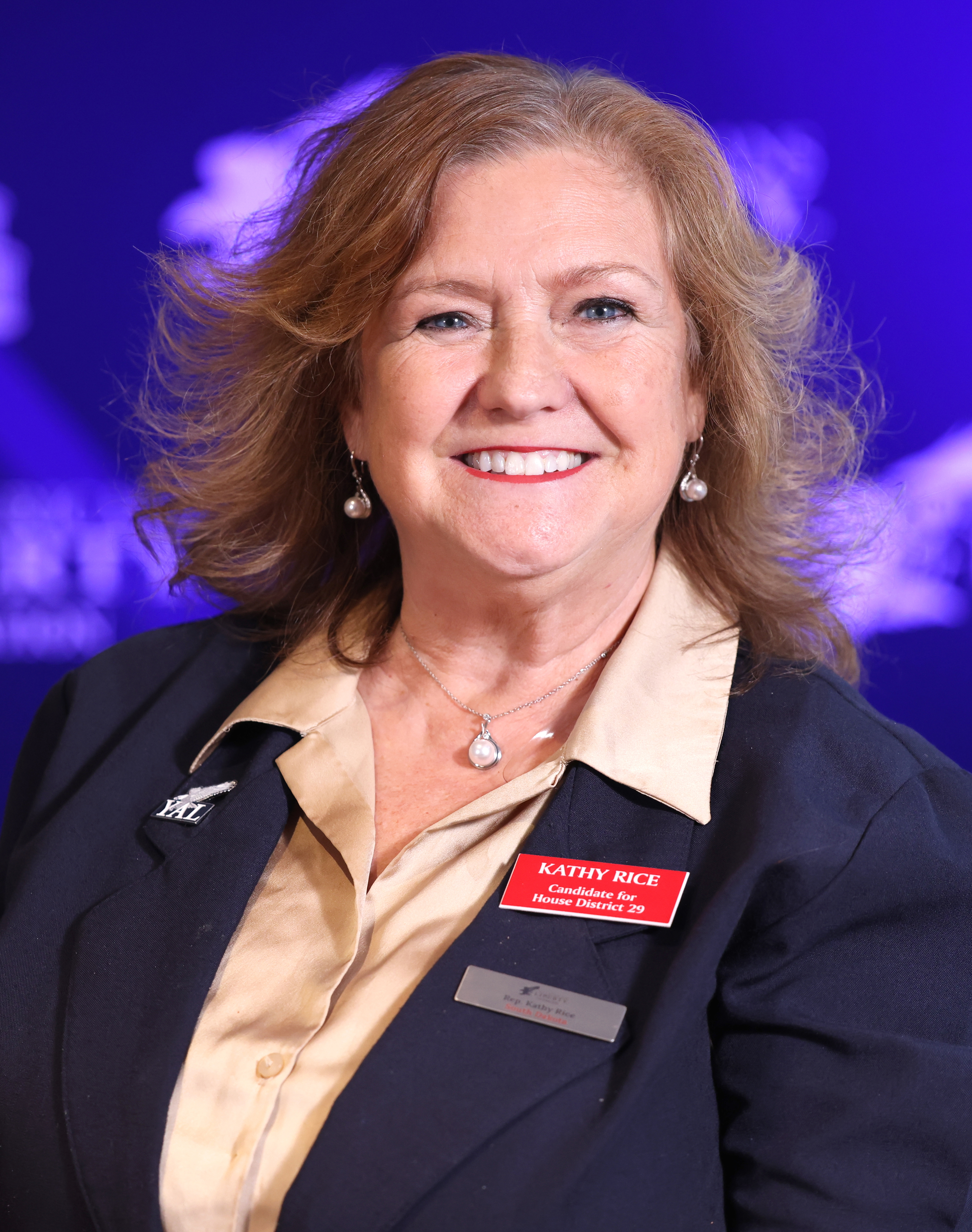
- Rice in 2024

Member of the South Dakota House of Representatives from the 29th district
- Incumbent
- Assumed office January 14, 2025 Serving with Terri Jorgenson

Personal details
- Born: October 16, 1961 (age 64)
- Party: Republican
- Website: kricefor29.com

Kathy Rice (born October 16, 1961) is an American politician. She serves as a Republican member for the 29th district in the South Dakota House of Representatives since 2025. The district includes the cities of Faith, Union Center and Sturgis.
