= Terri Jorgenson =

American politician

Member of the South Dakota House of Representatives from the 29th district
- Incumbent
- Assumed office January 14, 2025 Serving with Kathy Rice

Personal details
- Born: February 5, 1957 (age 69)
- Party: Republican
- Website: www.terrijorgenson.com

Terri Jorgenson (born February 5, 1957) is an American politician. She serves as a Republican member for the 29th district in the South Dakota House of Representatives since 2025. The district includes the cities of Faith, Union Center and Sturgis.
