= Tim Czmowski =

American politician

Member of the South Dakota House of Representatives from the 6th district
- Incumbent
- Assumed office February 18, 2025 Serving with Aaron Aylward
- Preceded by: Herman Otten

Personal details
- Party: Republican
- Education: South Dakota State University

Tim Czmowski is an American politician. He serves as a Republican member for the 6th district in the South Dakota House of Representatives since 2025. Governor Larry Rhoden appointed him to the seat vacated by Herman Otten. His district contains portions of Lincoln County.
