= Brian Mulder =

American politician

Member of the South Dakota House of Representatives from the 11th district
- Incumbent
- Assumed office January 10, 2023 Serving with Chris Karr

Personal details
- Born: July 11, 1976 (age 50)
- Party: Republican
- Education: Crown College

Brian Mulder (born July 11, 1976) is an American politician. He has served as a member of the South Dakota House of Representatives from the 11th district since 2023, alongside Chris Karr. He is a member of the Republican Party.
