= Chris Kassin =

American politician

Member of the South Dakota House of Representatives from the 17th district
- Incumbent
- Assumed office January 10, 2023 Serving with William Shorma

Personal details
- Born: February 7, 1980 (age 46)
- Party: Republican
- Education: University of South Dakota

Chris Kassin (born February 7, 1980) is an American politician. He has served as a member of the South Dakota House of Representatives from the 17th district since 2023, alongside William Shorma. He is a member of the Republican Party.
