= Jim Halverson =

American politician

Member of the South Dakota House of Representatives from the 21st district
- Incumbent
- Assumed office January 14, 2025 Serving with Marty Overweg

Personal details
- Party: Republican
- Website: halversonforhouse.com

Jim Halverson is an American politician. He serves as a Republican member for the 21st district in the South Dakota House of Representatives since 2025. His district is located in the south-eastern part of the state and includes the cities of Platte and Gregory.
