= Reynold Nesiba =

Member of the South Dakota Senate

Minority Leader of the South Dakota Senate
- In office January 10, 2023 – January 14, 2025
- Preceded by: Troy Heinert
- Succeeded by: Liz Larson

Member of the South Dakota Senate from the 15th district
- In office January 10, 2017 – January 14, 2025
- Preceded by: Angie Buhl
- Succeeded by: Jamie Smith

Personal details
- Born: May 7, 1966 (age 60) St. Paul, Nebraska, U.S.
- Party: Democratic
- Spouse: Erika Nesiba
- Education: University of Denver (BA); University of Notre Dame (MA, PhD)
- Website: Campaign website

Reynold F. Nesiba (born May 7, 1966) is an American politician and a former Democratic member of the South Dakota Senate representing District 15 from 2017 to 2025. He served as Minority Leader from 2023 to 2025. Nesiba is a professor of economics at Augustana University in Sioux Falls, South Dakota.

== Early life and education ==
Nesiba was born in St. Paul, Nebraska, to Leonard Nesiba, a World War II veteran and small business owner, and Irene (Schmale) Nesiba. Together, Nesiba's parents owned and operated Nesiba's Cafe in St. Paul.

In 1989, Nesiba earned his Bachelor of Arts in economics at the University of Denver. Six years later, he completed his PhD in economics from the University of Notre Dame, where he also procured his master's degree.

== Career ==
In 1995, Nesiba was hired by Augustana University in Sioux Falls as an assistant professor. After six years in this capacity, he was promoted to associate professor of economics, a post he would occupy until 2013. He is now a professor of economics at the same university, simultaneously serving as a member of the board of directors for Higher Education Consortium for Urban Affairs (HECUA). He was also welcomed as a visiting scholar at his alma mater, Notre Dame University, in 2002. The next year, he worked as a senior visiting scholar at Curtin University in Perth.

Nesiba is a member of the Association for Institutional Thought and the Association for Evolutionary Economics. He has co-authored textbooks in his area of expertise: "An Introduction to Financial Markets and Institutions" and "Economics: An Introduction to Traditional and Progressive Views" along with a handful of other publications in journals such as Social Problems, the Journal of Economic Issues, On the Horizon, and Cityscape.

== Publications and research ==
Burton, Maureen, Bruce Brown, and Reynold F. Nesiba. An Introduction to Financial Markets and Institutions, 2nd ed. Armonk, New York: M. E. Sharpe, Inc., 2010

Sherman, Howard, E. K. Hunt, Reynold F. Nesiba, Philip A. O'Hara, and Barbara A. Wiens-Tuers. Economics: An Introduction to Traditional and Progressive Views, 7th ed. Armonk, New York: M.E. Sharpe, Inc., 2008

Nesiba, Reynold. “Do Institutionalists and Post-Keynesians Share a Common Approach to Modern Monetary Theory (MMT)? European Journal of Economics and Economic Policies: Intervention, (May 2013), Vol. 10 No. 1, 2013, pp. 44–60.

Williams, Richard, Reynold F. Nesiba, and Eileen Diaz McConnell. “The Changing Face of Inequality in Home Mortgage Lending.” Social Problems 52:2 (May 2005): 181–208.

Williams, Richard, and Reynold F. Nesiba. “Racial, Economic and Institutional Differences in Home Mortgage Loans in St. Joseph County, Indiana.” Journal of Urban Affairs 19:1 (1997): 73–103.

== Policy positions ==
Nesiba's stated "legislative priorities are to protect the use of ballot measures, to continue to rein in predatory lenders, to properly fund education, and to advocate for economic development policies that prioritize workers and local entrepreneurs over out of state corporations." He also voiced his intention to push for Medicaid expansion, citing overwhelming support on the issue from citizens and Governor Dennis Daugaard.

=== Social issues ===
Nesiba is pro-choice and pro-gay marriage. He opposes any kind of "bathroom bill".

=== Taxes ===
While he supports an increase in taxes on cigarettes, alcohol and gas/oil, Nesiba opposes increases on property and sales tax. He is also an outspoken critic of South Dakota's tax on food for home consumption.

=== Voting and elections ===
Nesiba is an advocate for automatic registration and campaign finance reform.

=== Immigration ===
The senator hopes the government provides a pathway to citizenship for undocumented workers, who he says "should be eligible for in-state tuition and financial assistance".

== Tenure (South Dakota Senate) ==
As a Senator, his authored bills have focused on issues ranging from paid leave (sick and maternity), marijuana decriminalization and the protection of whistleblowers.

Nesiba is a member of the Committee on Appropriations.

Nesiba is the ranking member on the Appropriations Committee. He also serves on the Legislative Procedure and Retirement Laws Committees.

== Controversy ==
On Monday, November 14, 2016, six days after his election to the South Dakota Senate, Nesiba was arrested and charged with sexual contact without consent. The 51-year-old victim accused him of making "unwanted sexual advances" and refusing to leave her home. Six weeks earlier, Nesiba had spoken to police about the incident, at which time he denied using force. He was under the impression that the woman was simply "playing hard to get," an account and paraphrase provided by law enforcement officials and not the words that Nesiba himself had used during his interview.

At the time, the South Dakota Democratic Party released a statement, temporarily cutting ties with Nesiba citing "the serious allegations pending against him" which could "greatly impede his ability to be an effective legislator and distract from the important work of the caucus."

On January 3, 2017, the Minnehaha County State's Attorney's Office dropped the charge against Nesiba, citing inconsistencies in the evidence. Three days later, he was reinstated by his party and its senate caucus.

== Recognition and awards ==
- Augustana Student Association Faculty Recognition Award, 2006
- Vernon and Mildred Niebuhr Faculty Excellence Award, 2006

South Dakota Senate
| Preceded by Troy Heinert | Minority Leader of the South Dakota Senate; 2023–2025 | Succeeded by Liz Larson |
