= Arthur Rusch =

American politician

Member of the South Dakota Senate from the 17th district
- Incumbent
- Assumed office 2015

Personal details
- Born: March 16, 1946 (age 80)
- Party: Republican
- Spouse: Lana
- Children: four
- Profession: lawyer, professor

Arthur L. Rusch (born March 16, 1946) is an American politician. He serves as a Republican member of the South Dakota Senate, where he represents District 17 (encompassing parts of Clay County and Turner County).
