= Bobbi Andera =

American politician

Member of the South Dakota House of Representatives from the 10th district
- Incumbent
- Assumed office January 14, 2025 Serving with Erin Healy

Personal details
- Born: March 14, 1972 (age 54)
- Party: Republican
- Website: bobbilanderaforhouse.com

Bobbi L. Andera (born March 14, 1972) is an American politician. She serves as a Republican member for the 10th district in the South Dakota House of Representatives since 2025. The district includes northeast Sioux Falls. She is a laboratory business manager.
