= Nicole Uhre-Balk =

American educator and politician

Member of the South Dakota House of Representatives from the 32nd district
- Incumbent
- Assumed office January 14, 2025 Serving with Steve Duffy
- Preceded by: Kristin Conzet

Personal details
- Born: August 16, 1982 (age 44)
- Party: Democratic
- Relations: Carole Hillard (aunt)
- Education: Bethel University; Black Hills State University

Nicole Uhre-Balk (born August 16, 1982) is an American educator and politician serving as a member of the South Dakota House of Representatives for legislative district 32. She is a member of the Democratic Party.

== Early life and education ==
Uhre-Balk spent most of her childhood in the Black Hills of South Dakota. Her early years were marked by experiences on her family's ranch, where she was exposed to agriculture and small business operations. Her mother was involved in community activities, including Toastmasters and local boards. Uhre-Balk's aunt, Carole Hillard, was the lieutenant governor of South Dakota from 1995 to 2003.

Uhre-Balk attended Pinedale Elementary School in Rapid City, South Dakota. During her high school years, she worked at what is now Black Hills Works. She attended Bethel University, where she completed a double major in biology and environmental studies. After working briefly with the U.S. Forest Service, she earned a M.S. in curriculum and instruction from Black Hills State University.

== Career ==
Uhre-Balk's was a high school and middle school biology and computer science teacher. For over ten years, she worked in educational settings, including Muckleshoot Tribal Schools near Mount Rainier, Central High School, and a STEM lab in Boston, Massachusetts. As an education consultant at Compass (formerly known as Technology & Innovation in Education), Uhre-Balk provided professional development for teachers across South Dakota. Her work included curriculum mapping, computational thinking, and the integration of artificial intelligence into educational programs.

In March 2024, Uhre-Balk declared her candidacy to represent the 32nd legislative district of the South Dakota House of Representatives, a district encompassing parts of downtown Rapid City, north Rapid City, and the West Boulevard Avenue and Robbinsdale areas. Her campaign platform focused on addressing educational issues, such as revising the state's school funding formula, increasing teacher salaries, and supporting programs that develop career-ready skills in students.

During the 2024 South Dakota House of Representatives election, Uhre-Balk won one of the two seats for District 32, succeeding Kristin Conzet. She received 3,326 votes, narrowly besting Republican incumbent Steve Duffy, who received 3,304 votes, and Republican Brook Kaufman, who received 2,762 votes. Uhre-Balk will serve alongside Duffy, the other elected representative for District 32. She is the first Democrat to represent her district in 18 years.

== Personal life ==
Uhre-Balk lives in Rapid City with her spouse, Forest Balk. She participates in community organizations, including the Rapid City Sustainability Committee and Friends of Rapid City Parks, where she serves on the board. She is a South Dakota Volunteer Naturalist and has been involved in conservation efforts across the Black Hills.
