= John Hughes (South Dakota politician) =

American politician

Member of the South Dakota House of Representatives from the 13th district
- Incumbent
- Assumed office January 14, 2025 Serving with Jack Kolbeck

Personal details
- Party: Republican
- Education: South Dakota State University; University of Nebraska–Lincoln
- Website: www.johnhughesdistrict13.com

John Hughes is an American politician. He serves as a Republican member for the 13th district in the South Dakota House of Representatives since 2025. His district is located in the south-eastern part of Sioux Falls, South Dakota. Hughes works as an attorney and small business owner. Hughes intends to work on drug legislation.
