= Kevin Van Diepen =

American politician

Member of the South Dakota House of Representatives from the 22nd district
- Incumbent
- Assumed office January 14, 2025 Serving with Lana Greenfield

Personal details
- Party: Republican

Kevin Van Diepen is an American politician. She serves as a Republican member for the 22nd district in the South Dakota House of Representatives since 2025. The district contains the cities of Huron and Redfield.
