= South Dakota's 21st legislative district =

American legislative district

South Dakota's 21st State Senate district

South Dakota's 21st legislative district is one of 35 districts in the South Dakota Legislature. Each district is represented by 1 senator and 2 representatives. In the Senate, it has been represented by Republican MyKala Voita since 2025. In the House, it has been represented by Republicans Jim Halverson since 2025 and Marty Overweg since 2020.

== Representatives ==
- Rocky Blare (2021-2025)

== Geography ==
The district is located within Aurora, Charles Mix, Douglas, Gregory, and Tripp counties in southern South Dakota. Its largest city is Platte. The district contains the entirety of the Yankton Indian Reservation.
