= South Dakota's 17th legislative district =

American legislative district

South Dakota's 17th State Senate district

South Dakota's 17th legislative district is one of 35 districts in the South Dakota Legislature. Each district is represented by 1 senator and 2 representatives. In the Senate, it has been represented by Republican Sydney Davis since 2023. In the House, it has been represented by Republicans Chris Kassin and William Shorma since 2023.

== Geography ==
The district is located within Clay and Union County in southeastern South Dakota.
