= Rebecca Reimer =

American politician

Member of the South Dakota House of Representatives from the 26B district
- Incumbent
- Assumed office August 8, 2018 Serving with Shawn Bordeaux
- Preceded by: James Schaefer
- Succeeded by: Angi Hanzlik (elect)

Personal details
- Born: November 8, 1964 (age 62)
- Party: Republican

Rebecca Reimer (born November 8, 1964) is an American politician and a Republican member of the South Dakota House of Representatives representing District 26B. Reimer was appointed to her position in August 2018 by South Dakota governor Dennis Daugaard to fill the seat left by James Schaefer after he died in May 2018.
