= Red Dawn Foster =

American politician

Member of the South Dakota Senate from the 27th district
- Incumbent
- Assumed office January 8, 2019

Personal details
- Party: Democratic
- Children: 1
- Education: University of Colorado Denver (BA); University of Notre Dame (MBA)

Red Dawn Foster is an American politician serving as a member of the South Dakota Senate from the 27th district, which encompasses the Pine Ridge Reservation as well as Bennett, Haakon, Jackson, Pennington and Oglala Lakota counties. Elected in November 2018, she assumed office on January 8, 2019, and is the current incumbent.

== Early life and education ==
Red Dawn Foster graduated with a Bachelor of Arts in political science from the University of Colorado Denver and a Master of Business Administration from the University of Notre Dame. She is a member of the Oglala Sioux and Navajo tribes.

== Political career ==
=== South Dakota State Legislature ===
==== Elections ====
In 2016, Foster ran alongside state Senator Jim Bradford for a seat in the South Dakota House of Representatives from the 27th district. However, in the general election she and Bradford lost to Republican nominees Liz May and Steve Livermont.

In the 2018 Democratic Primary, Red Dawn Foster ran against James Bradford and won 55.6% of the vote. In the general election, Foster ran against Republican Bill Hines and won 58.6% of the votes.

In 2020, she ran against Republican Judd Schomp in the general election, winning 56.3% of the votes.

In 2022, Foster ran as incumbent and beat Republican David Jones in the general election with 51.45% of votes.

According to South Dakota state legislative term limits, Foster can serve one more term in the Senate and is eligible to run for re-election in 2024.

==== Tenure ====
From 2019 to 2020, Foster served on the Agriculture and Natural Resources, Health and Human Services, Military and Veterans Affairs, and Transportation committees. In the 2021-2022 legislative session, Foster served on the Commerce and Energy, Health and Human Services, and Local Government committees. In 2022, Foster also served on the Ag. Land Assessment Task Force, Rules Review, State-Tribal Relations and Study on Juvenile Justice interim committees.

==== Sponsored Bills and Political Positions (2022 Session) ====
===== Native American Rights =====
Foster has spent her career advocating for the rights of Native American people in South Dakota and has sponsored a number of bills aimed at recognizing the achievements of Indigenous people as well as bills aimed at providing Native Americans the right to hunt, fish, and visit state parks free of licenses and fees. A controversial topic in South Dakota, Foster advocates for the inclusion of Native American History in South Dakota curriculum.

Bill	Title
SD HB 1195	direct the Indian Education Advisory Council to make an annual report to the Governor and the State-Tribal Relations Committee.
SD HCR 6001	Opining that the star quilt should be recognized as the official quilt of this state.
SD SB 161	make an appropriation for matching funds to enhance research in manufacturing processes having lunar application and planetary use in tribal housing development and to declare an emergency.
SD SC 814	Recognizing Norma Rendon, Waciampi Win, for her life of honor, service, and leadership.
SD SC 817	Commending the Social Distance Powwow for promoting traditional songs, dance, and a sense of community in the virtual world amidst a global pandemic.
SD SC 824	Honoring and Commending the Lakota Nation Invitational for its 45 years of success and its unique ability to showcase Native youth and their exceptional talents.
SD SC 825	Honoring and Commending Stevi Fallis for earning her 1,000th point and the Red Cloud High School girls basketball team for their exceptional athleticism throughout the 2021-2022 basketball season.
SD HB 1141	exempt members of Indian tribes in South Dakota from hunting and fishing license fees.
SD HB 1142	exempt members of Indian tribes from admission fees, camping permit fees, and park service fees of state parks.
SD HB 1170	incorporate the Oceti Sakowin Essential Understandings in the social studies curriculum.
SD HB 1185	permit the wearing of a beaded graduation cap at a school honoring or graduation ceremony.
SD HB 1148	make an appropriation for the erection of the South Dakota Sioux Code Talker Memorial and to declare an emergency.
SD HC 8014	Honoring the life and service of Dr. Arthur W. Zimiga.
SD HC 8015	Honoring the work of Ethleen Iron Cloud Two Dogs.
SD HC 8016	Honoring the work of Beverly Warne.
SD HCR 6014	Urging the federal government to fulfill treaty obligations by fully funding the Oglala and Rosebud Sioux Tribe Departments of Public Safety for the public safety crisis on the Pine Ridge and Rosebud Sioux Reservations.

===== Missing or Murdered Indigenous Persons =====
Senator Foster has introduced and sponsored a number of bills dedicated to drawing attention to the Missing or Murdered Indigenous Persons movement, which focuses on the high rates of unsolved murders and disappearances of Native Americans, specifically Indigenous women and girls, who are far more likely than other demographics to be victims of violence in their lifetimes.

Bill	Title
SD HB 1171	revise provisions related to missing children
SD HB 1194	make an appropriation to the Office of Attorney General to temporarily fund a position within the Office of Liaison for Missing and Murdered Indigenous Persons, and to declare an emergency.
SD HB1264	make an appropriation for the Liaison for Missing and Murdered Indigenous Persons Office, and to declare an emergency.

===== Medicaid Expansion =====
The expansion of Medicaid and Medicare programs are a heavily discussed topic in many states, and Foster is a strong advocate for the expansion of these programs in South Dakota.

Bill	Title
SD HB 1103	provide a reimbursement schedule for chiropractic, dental, and optometric services under the Medicaid program.
SD SB 102	create the Medicaid expansion fund and to provide for the receipt of monies received as a result of expanding Medicaid eligibility.
SD SB 186	expand Medicaid eligibility by the Legislature.

=== Covid-19 Controversy ===
When the COVID-19 virus spread to South Dakota in 2020, the Cheyenne River Sioux and Oglala Sioux tribes instituted checkpoints on highways leading through reservation land in an attempt to limit the spread of the virus. During this time, the Navajo nation had been suffering high rates of infection and death due to the virus after reaching out to the United States Government and receiving little help. South Dakota's Governor Kristi Noem, who refused to implement any measures to combat COVID-19 and prioritized keeping the state open to benefit the economy, threatened to take legal action against the tribes, accusing them of breaking the law. The tribes combatted the threats with arguments that the checkpoints were legally instituted because the tribes are sovereign nations. Senator Red Dawn Foster stood with the tribes in criticizing the governor's lack of action and threats against tribes, stating that the Coronavirus was "a matter of life and death on a reservation.".

== See also ==
- List of Native American politicians
- Native American women in politics
