= South Dakota's 34th legislative district =

American legislative district

South Dakota's 34th State Senate district

South Dakota's 34th legislative district is one of 35 districts in the South Dakota Legislature. Each district elects one senator and two representatives. In the state senate, it has been represented by Republican Michael Diedrich since 2021. In the state house, it has been represented by Republican Mike Derby since 2021. Its other seat is currently vacant, and was last held by Jess Olson, who resigned in 2023.

== Geography ==
Located in western South Dakota, the district resides within Pennington County in Rapid City.
