= South Dakota's 11th legislative district =

American legislative district

South Dakota's 11th State Senate district

South Dakota's 11th legislative district is one of 35 districts in the South Dakota Legislature. Each district is represented by 1 senator and 2 representatives. In the Senate, it has been represented by Republican Jim Stalzer since 2017. In the House, it has been represented by Republicans Chris Karr since 2023 and Brian Mulder since 2017.

== Geography ==
The district is located in the western suburbs of Sioux Falls entirely within Minnehaha County, the state's most populous county, in southeastern South Dakota.
