= Bethany Soye =

American politician (born 1991)

Member of the South Dakota House of Representatives from the 9th district
- Incumbent
- Assumed office January 12, 2021

Personal details
- Born: July 5, 1991 (age 35) Chadron, Nebraska, U.S.
- Party: Republican
- Education: North Central University (BS); College of William & Mary (MPP, JD)

Bethany Soye (born July 5, 1991) is an American attorney and politician serving as a member of the South Dakota House of Representatives from the 9th district. Elected in November 2020, she assumed office on January 12, 2021.

== Early life and education ==
Soye was born in Chadron, Nebraska. She earned a Bachelor of Science degree in business administration from North Central University, followed by a joint Master of Public Policy and Juris Doctor from the College of William & Mary.

== Career ==
Soye works as a financial compliance attorney at MetaBank. She was previously a legal intern in the United States Department of Justice and served as a law clerk in the office of Senator Ted Cruz. She was also a judicial extern for the Supreme Court of Virginia. For two years, she was also a research assistant at the National Center for State Courts. Soye was elected to the South Dakota House of Representatives in November 2021 and assumed office on January 12, 2021.
