= Marty Overweg =

American politician

Member of the South Dakota House of Representatives from the 19th district
- Incumbent
- Assumed office January 6, 2020
- Preceded by: Kyle Schoenfish

Personal details
- Party: Republican
- Children: 5

Marty Overweg is an American politician and businessman serving as a member of the South Dakota House of Representatives from the 19th district. A member of the Republican Party, Overweg assumed office on January 6, 2020 after being nominated by Governor Kristi Noem to succeed Kyle Schoenfish, who was appointed to the State Senate.

A resident of New Holland, South Dakota, Overweg owns an agricultural sales company. He and his wife have five children.
