= Peri Pourier =

American politician

Member of the South Dakota House of Representatives from the 27th district
- Incumbent
- Assumed office January 8, 2019
- Preceded by: Liz May

Personal details
- Born: March 7, 1983 (age 43)
- Citizenship: American; Oglala-Lakota
- Party: Democratic (before 2025); Republican (2025–present)

Peri Pourier (born March 7, 1983) is an American attorney and politician serving as a Republican member of the South Dakota House of Representatives from the 27th district. Elected in November 2018, she assumed office on January 8, 2019.

== Career ==
Pourier has served as a member of the South Dakota House of Representatives from the 27th district since 2019. She was elected as a Democrat but switched to become a Republican in September 2025, citing the Democratic Party's perceived soft-on-crime stances as well as the Indian Reorganization Act signed into law by Franklin D. Roosevelt in 1934.

Prior to entering politics, she worked as a background investigator. As of 2022 her official profile listed her occupation as “small business owner”. Pourier is a member of the Oglala tribal group and lives in Pine Ridge, South Dakota.

== See also ==
- List of American politicians who switched parties in office
- List of Native American politicians
- Native American women in politics
