= Jack Kolbeck =

American politician

Member of the South Dakota House of Representatives from the 13th district
- Incumbent
- Assumed office February 5, 2025 Serving with John Hughes
- Preceded by: Tony Venhuizen

Member of the South Dakota Senate from the 13th district
- In office January 10, 2017 – December 31, 2024
- Succeeded by: Sue Peterson

Personal details
- Born: January 26, 1952 (age 74) McCook County, South Dakota, U.S.
- Party: Republican
- Spouse: Muriel
- Children: 3
- Education: South Dakota State University (BBA)

Jack Kolbeck (born January 26, 1952) is an American politician serving as a member of the South Dakota House of Representatives from the 13th district since 2025. He previously represented the same district in the South Dakota Senate from 2017 to 2024.

== Background ==
Kolbeck was born in McCook County, South Dakota. He earned a bachelor's degree in business from South Dakota State University. He and his wife, Muriel, have three children. Since 1972, Kolbeck has also worked as a beer distributor in Sioux Falls, South Dakota. He is a member of the Republican Party.

In February 2025, Kolbeck was appointed to the South Dakota House of Representatives to succeed Tony Venhuizen, who was appointed as Lieutenant Governor.
