= Taylor Rehfeldt =

American politician (born 1988)

Member of the South Dakota House of Representatives from the 14th district
- Incumbent
- Assumed office January 11, 2021 Serving with Erin Healy
- Preceded by: Larry Zikmund

Personal details
- Born: Taylor Rae Rehfeldt; December 19, 1988 (age 37)
- Party: Republican
- Education: South Dakota State University (BSN); South Dakota School of Mines and Technology (BS); Mount Marty University (MS, DNP)

Taylor Rae Rehfeldt (born December 19, 1988) is an American politician and registered nurse anesthetist serving as a member of the South Dakota House of Representatives from the 14th district. Elected in November 2020, she assumed office on January 12, 2021.

== Education ==
Rehfeldt earned a Bachelor of Science in Nursing from South Dakota State University, a Bachelor of Science in interdisciplinary science from the South Dakota School of Mines and Technology, and a Master of Science and Doctor of Nursing Practice in nurse anesthesia from Mount Marty University.

== Career ==
Prior to entering politics, Rehfeldt worked as a nurse anesthetist. She was elected to the South Dakota House of Representatives in November 2020 and assumed office on January 11, 2021.
