= Eric Emery =

American politician and emergency medical services professional

Eric E. Emery

Member of the South Dakota House of Representatives from the 26A district
- Incumbent
- Assumed office January 10, 2023
- Preceded by: Shawn Bordeaux

Assistant Minority Leader of the South Dakota House of Representatives
- Incumbent
- Assumed office 2025

Personal details
- Party: Democratic
- Profession: Emergency medical services professional
- Committees: House State Affairs; Health and Human Services; State–Tribal Relations; Government Operations and Audit

Eric E. Emery is an American Democratic politician and emergency medical services (EMS) professional who is a member of the South Dakota House of Representatives for District 26A. He is the program director of the Rosebud Sioux Tribe Ambulance Service in Rosebud, South Dakota. From 2015 to 2021, he was on the National Emergency Medical Services Advisory Council (NEMSAC), providing policy guidance to the United States Department of Transportation. In the South Dakota Legislature, Emery has concentrated on rural health initiatives, EMS system sustainability, tribal public health policy, and legislation to establish EMS as an essential service in the state.

== Career ==
Emery is the Program Director of the Rosebud Sioux Tribe Ambulance Service, overseeing staffing, fleet modernization, and integration of EMS with rural and tribal health systems.

He also appeared on the American Medical Association’s Ethics Talk podcast to discuss rural EMS challenges and the role of policy in supporting services.

From 2015 to 2021, Emery served on the National Emergency Medical Services Advisory Council (NEMSAC), where he advised the U.S. Department of Transportation on national EMS policy.

== Political career ==
Emery was elected to the South Dakota House of Representatives for District 26A in 2022 and took office on January 10, 2023, succeeding Shawn Bordeaux.

Emery was re-elected in 2024, defeating Republican Ron Frederick and independent William Lafferty, and was re-elected again in the November 3, 2026 general election.

In the Legislature, he has focused on EMS sustainability, rural health care, and recognition of EMS as an essential public service.

He is the Assistant Minority Leader of the South Dakota House of Representatives, a leadership position he assumed in 2025. He is on the House committees for House State Affairs, Health and Human Services, State–Tribal Relations and Government Operations and Audit.

In November 2026, House Democrats selected Emery as minority leader for the 2027–2028 legislative term.

In January 2025, he introduced House Bill 1043, aiming to establish a state EMS fund and require local governments to provide services; the bill did not pass committee.

== Personal life ==
Emery resides in Rosebud, South Dakota. Outside of his legislative duties, he continues to work in emergency medical services administration, focusing on improving rural health access and supporting tribal EMS systems.

== See also ==
- South Dakota House of Representatives
- Emergency medical services in the United States
