= South Dakota's 16th legislative district =

American legislative district

South Dakota's 16th State Senate district

South Dakota's 16th legislative district is one of 35 districts in the South Dakota Legislature. Each district is represented by 1 senator and 2 representatives. In the Senate, it has been represented by Republican Jim Bolin since 2017. In the House, it has been represented by Republicans Kevin Jensen since 2017 and Karla Lems since 2023.

== Geography ==
The district is located south of Sioux Falls within Lincoln, Turner, and Union County in rural southeastern South Dakota.
