= South Dakota's 20th legislative district =

American legislative district

South Dakota's 20th State Senate district

South Dakota's 20th legislative district is one of 35 districts in the South Dakota Legislature. Each district is represented by 1 senator and 2 representatives. In the Senate, it has been represented by Republican Joshua Klumb since 2017. In the House, it has been represented by Republicans Lance Koth since 2019 and Ben Krohmer since 2023.

== Geography ==
The district is located within Davison, Jerauld, Miner, and Sanborn County in southeastern South Dakota. Its largest city is Mitchell.
