= South Dakota's 29th legislative district =

American legislative district

South Dakota's 29th State Senate district

South Dakota's 29th legislative district is one of 35 districts in the South Dakota Legislature. Each district elects one senator and two representatives. In the state senate, it has been represented by Republican Dean Wink since 2023. In the state house, it has been represented by Republicans Gary Cammack since 2023 and Kirk Chaffee since 2019.

== Geography ==
Located in western South Dakota, the district contains nearly all of Meade County, north of Rapid City. Its largest city is Sturgis.
