= South Dakota's 13th legislative district =

American legislative district

South Dakota's 13th State Senate district

South Dakota's 13th legislative district is one of 35 districts in the South Dakota Legislature. Each district is represented by 1 senator and 2 representatives. In the Senate, it has been represented by Republican Sue Peterson since 2025. In the House, it has been represented by Republicans John Hughes and Jack Kolbeck since 2025.

== Geography ==
The district is located in southern Sioux Falls within Minnehaha County, the state's most populous county, and Lincoln County, in southeastern South Dakota.
