= South Dakota House of Representatives =

Lower house of U.S. state legislature

- South Dakota Legislature

Type
- Type: Lower house
- Term limits: 4 terms (8 years)

History
- New session started: January 14, 2025

Leadership
- Speaker: Jon Hansen (R) since January 14, 2025
- Speaker pro tempore: Karla Lems (R) since January 14, 2025
- Majority Leader: Scott Odenbach (R) since January 14, 2025
- Minority Leader: Erin Healy (D) since January 14, 2025

Structure
- Seats: 70
- Political groups: Outgoing legislature Majority: Republican (65); Minority: Democratic (5)
- Length of term: 2 years
- Authority: Article III, South Dakota Constitution
- Salary: $12,850.80/session + $151 per legislative day (Note: Legislative pay must be one-fifth of median household income of South Dakota)

Elections
- Last election: November 3, 2026
- Next election: November 7, 2028
- Redistricting: Legislative control

Meeting place
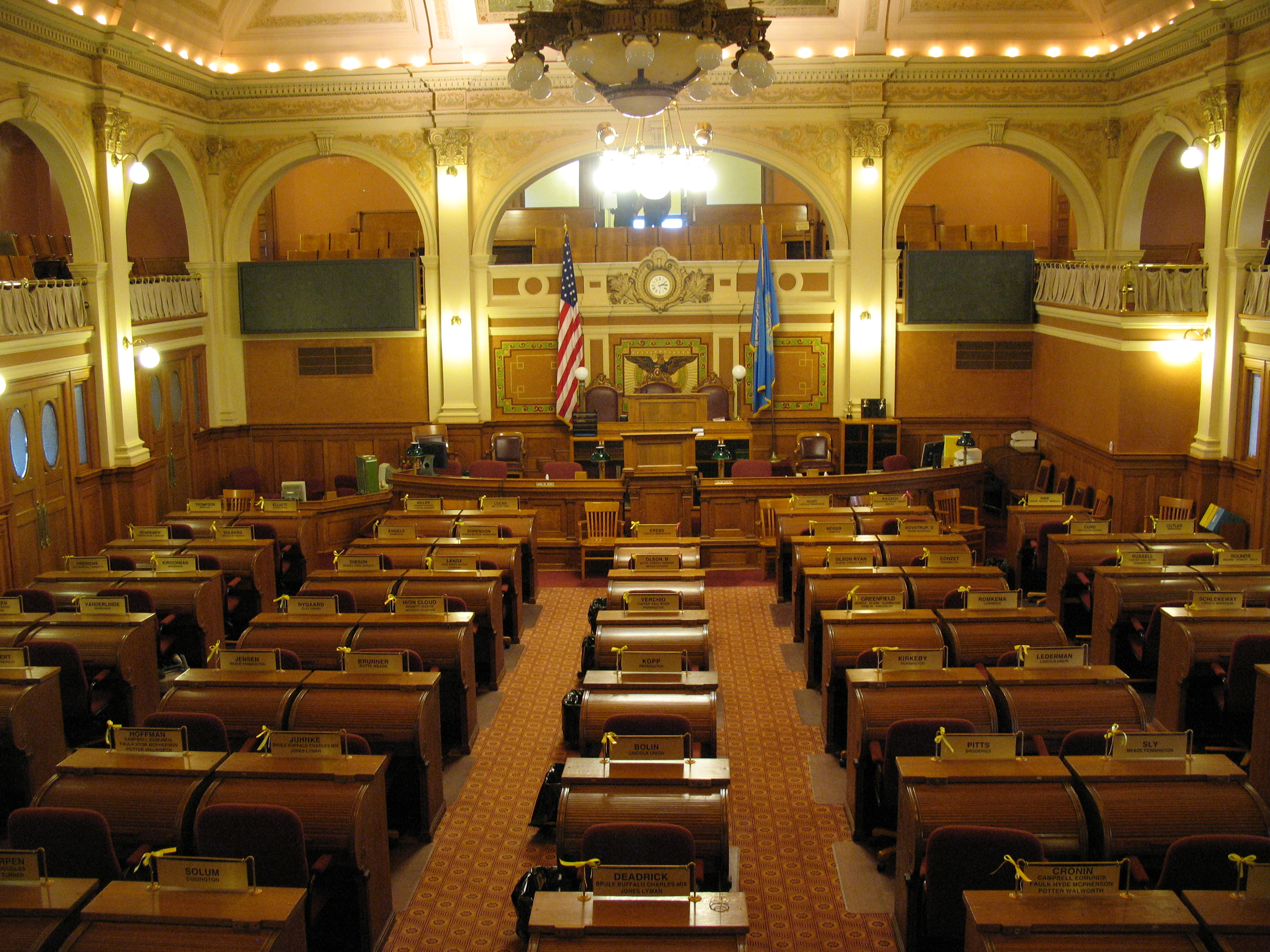
- House of Representatives Chamber; South Dakota State Capitol; Pierre, South Dakota

Website
- South Dakota State Legislature

The South Dakota House of Representatives is the lower house of the South Dakota Legislature. It consists of 70 members, two from each legislative district. Two of the state's 35 legislative districts, Districts 26 and 28, are each subdivided into two single-member districts (26A/26B and 28A/28B). The South Dakota House of Representatives meets at the South Dakota State Capitol in Pierre.

== Composition ==

Affiliation	Party (Shading indicates majority caucus)		Total	Vacant
Affiliation	Republican	Democratic	Total	Vacant
98th Legislature (2023–2024)	63	7	70	0
Start of 99th Legislature (2025) (Note: Herman Otten (R) declined to take office after being elected in district 6. Tim Czmowski (R) was appointed to the vacant seat in February 2024.)	63	6	69	1
January 29, 2025 (Note: Tony Venhuizen (R–13) resigned after being nominated as lieutenant governor. Former state senator Jack Kolbeck (R) was appointed to succeed Venhuizen in February 2025.)	62	6	68	2
February 5, 2025	63	6	69	1
February 12, 2025	64	6	70	0
May 1, 2025 (Note: Chris Reder (R–1) resigned after questions were raised about his residency. Nick Fosness (R) was appointed to succeed Reder in August 2025.)	63	6	69	1
August 5, 2025	64	6	70	0
August 27, 2025 (Note: Richard Vasgaard (R–16) died in a farming accident. John Shubeck (R) was appointed to succeed Vasgaard in September 2025.)	63	6	69	1
September 17, 2025	64	6	70	0
September 22, 2025 (Note: Peri Pourier (District 27) switched from the Democratic Party to the Republican Party.)	65	5	70	0
Latest voting share	93%	7%		

=== Leadership ===
Position	Name	Party	District
Speaker of the House	Jon Hansen	Republican	25
Speaker pro tempore	Karla Lems	Republican	16
Majority Leader	Scott Odenbach	Republican	31
Assistant Majority Leader	Marty Overweg	Republican	21
Majority Whips	Jessica Bahmuller	Republican	21
Majority Whips	Les Heinemann	Republican	25
Majority Whips	Greg Jamison	Republican	12
Majority Whips	Brandei Schaefbauer	Republican	3
Majority Whips	Bethany Soye	Republican	9
Minority Leader	Erin Healy	Democratic	10
Assistant Minority Leader	Eric Emery	Democratic	26A
Minority Whip	Kadyn Wittman	Democratic	15
Minority Whip	Nicole Uhre-Balk	Democratic	32

=== Members of the House for the 2025 legislative session ===
District	Name	Party	Residence	Start	Term Limited
1st	Logan Manhart	Republican	Sisseston	2025	No
1st	Nick Fosness	Republican	Britton	2025	No
2nd	David Kull	Republican	Aberdeen	2023	No
2nd	John Sjaarda	Republican	Valley Springs	2023	No
3rd	Brandei Schaefbauer	Republican	Aberdeen	2023	No
3rd	Al Novstrup	Republican	Aberdeen	2025	No
4th	Kent Roe	Republican	Hayti	2025	No
4th	Dylan C. Jordan	Republican	Clear Lake	2025	No
5th	Matt Roby	Republican	Watertown	2025	No
5th	Josephine Garcia	Republican	Watertown	2025	No
6th	Aaron Aylward	Republican	Harrisburg	2021	No
6th	Tim Czmowski	Republican	Sioux Falls	2025	No
7th	Mellissa Heermann	Republican	Brookings	2023	No
7th	Roger DeGroot	Republican	Brookings	2023	No
8th	Tim Walburg	Republican	Madison	2025	No
8th	Tim Reisch	Republican	Howard	2023	No
9th	Bethany Soye	Republican	Sioux Falls	2021	No
9th	Tesa Schwans	Republican	Hartford	2025	No
10th	Erin Healy	Democratic	Sioux Falls	2019	Yes
10th	Bobbi Andera	Republican	Sioux Falls	2025	No
11th	Brian Mulder	Republican	Sioux Falls	2023	No
11th	Keri Weems	Republican	Sioux Falls	2025	No
12th	Amber Arlint	Republican	Sioux Falls	2023	No
12th	Greg Jamison	Republican	Sioux Falls	2021	No
13th	John Hughes	Republican	Sioux Falls	2025	No
13th	Jack Kolbeck	Republican	Sioux Falls	2025	No
14th	Taylor Rehfeldt	Republican	Sioux Falls	2021	No
14th	Tony Kayser	Republican	Sioux Falls	2025	No
15th	Kadyn Wittman	Democratic	Sioux Falls	2023	No
15th	Eric Muckey	Democratic	Sioux Falls	2025	No
16th	Karla Lems	Republican	Hudson	2023	No
16th	John Shubeck	Republican	Beresford	2025	No
17th	William Shorma	Republican	Dakota Dunes	2023	No
17th	Chris Kassin	Republican	Vermillion	2023	No
18th	Mike Stevens	Republican	Yankton	2021	No
18th	Julie Auch	Republican	Yankton	2023	No
19th	Drew Peterson	Republican	Salem	2023	No
19th	Jessica Bahmuller	Republican	Alexandria	2023	No
20th	Jeff Bathke	Republican	Mitchell	2025	No
20th	Kaley Nolz	Republican	Mitchell	2025	No
21st	Jim Halverson	Republican	Winner	2025	No
21st	Marty Overweg	Republican	New Holland	2020	No
22nd	Lana Greenfield	Republican	Doland	2025	No
22nd	Kevin Van Diepen	Republican	Huron	2025	No
23rd	Spencer Gosch	Republican	Glenham	2025	No
23rd	Scott Moore	Republican	Ipswich	2023	No
24th	Will Mortenson	Republican	Pierre	2021	No
24th	Mike Weisgram	Republican	Fort Pierre	2021	No
25th	Les Heinemann	Republican	Flandreau	2025	No
25th	Jon Hansen	Republican	Dell Rapids	2019	Yes
26A	Eric Emery	Democratic	Rosebud	2023	No
26B	Rebecca Reimer	Republican	Chamberlain	2018	Yes
27th	Liz May	Republican	Kyle	2021	No
27th	Peri Pourier	Republican	Pine Ridge	2019	Yes
28A	Jana Hunt	Republican	Dupree	2025	No
28B	Travis Ismay	Republican	Newell	2025	No
29th	Terri Jorgenson	Republican	Rapid City	2025	No
29th	Kathy Rice	Republican	Blackhawk	2025	No
30th	Trish Ladner	Republican	Hot Springs	2021	No
30th	Tim Goodwin	Republican	Rapid City	2025	No
31st	Mary Fitzgerald	Republican	Spearfish	2021	No
31st	Scott Odenbach	Republican	Spearfish	2021	No
32nd	Nicole Uhre-Balk	Democratic	Rapid City	2025	No
32nd	Steve Duffy	Republican	Rapid City	2023	No
33rd	Curt Massie	Republican	Rapid City	2023	No
33rd	Phil Jensen	Republican	Rapid City	2021	No
34th	Mike Derby	Republican	Rapid City	2021	No
34th	Heather Baxter	Republican	Rapid City	2025	No
35th	Tina Mulally	Republican	Rapid City	2019	Yes
35th	Tony Randolph	Republican	Rapid City	2019	Yes

== See also ==
- South Dakota Senate
- List of South Dakota state legislatures
