= 2022 South Dakota House of Representatives election =

- November 8, 2022

All 70 seats in the South Dakota House of Representatives 36 seats needed for a majority

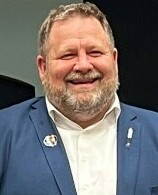
	Majority party	Minority party
Leader	Spencer Gosch (retired)	Jamie Smith (retired)
Party	Republican	Democratic
Leader's seat	23rd	15th
Seats before	62	8
Seats after	63	7
Seat change	▲1	▼1
Popular vote	361,683	114,138
Percentage	75.50%	23.83%
Swing	▲3.75%	▼3.89%
- Results: Republican gain Democratic gain Republican hold Democratic hold
Speaker before election
Spencer Gosch
Republican
Elected Speaker
Hugh Bartels
Republican

The 2022 South Dakota House of Representatives elections were held on November 8, 2022, as part of the biennial 2022 United States elections. All 70 seats in the South Dakota House of Representatives were up for election. Primary elections were held on June 7, 2022. The elections coincided with elections for other offices in South Dakota, including the US Senate, U.S. House, South Dakota governor, South Dakota secretary of state, South Dakota attorney general, and the South Dakota Senate.

Following the 2022 elections, Republicans expanded their supermajority by one seat, giving them a 63-to-7 member advantage over Democrats.

== Retirements ==
=== Democrats ===
1. District 1: Jennifer Healy Keintz retired to run for lieutenant governor of South Dakota.
2. District 15: Jamie Smith retired to run for governor of South Dakota.
3. District 26A: Shawn Bordeaux retired due to term limits.

=== Republicans ===
1. District 2: Lana Greenfield retired due to term limits.
2. District 3: Drew Dennert retired.
3. District 5: Nancy York retired.
4. District 7: Tim Reed retired to run for state senate from District 7.
5. District 7: Larry Tidemann retired.
6. District 8: Marli Wiese retired.
7. District 9: Rhonda Milstead retired.
8. District 10: Doug Barthel retired.
9. District 10: Steve Haugaard retired due to term limits.
10. District 11: Mark Willadsen retired due to term limits.
11. District 12: Arch Beal retired due to term limits.
12. District 16: David Anderson retired due to term limits.
13. District 17: Sydney Davis retired to run for state senate from District 17.
14. District 19: Kent Peterson retired due to term limits.
15. District 20: Paul Miskimins retired.
16. District 23: Spencer Gosch retired to run for state senate from District 23.
17. District 23: Charles Hoffman retired.
18. District 25: Tom Pischke retired to run for state senate from District 25.
19. District 28B: J. Sam Marty retired due to term limits.
20. District 29: Dean Wink retired to run for state senate from District 29.
21. District 30: Tim Goodwin retired to run for state senate from District 30.
22. District 32: Chris P. Johnson retired.
23. District 33: Taffy Howard retired to run for U.S. representative from South Dakota's at-large congressional district.

== Predictions ==
Source	Ranking	As of
Sabato's Crystal Ball	Safe R	May 19, 2022

== Defeated incumbents ==
=== Primary election ===
1. District 3: Republican Kaleb Weis lost renomination to Brandei Schaefbauer.
2. District 13: Republican Richard Thomason lost renomination to Tony Vanhuizen.
3. District 16: Republican Richard Vasgaard lost renomination to Karla Lems.
4. District 19: Republican Caleb Finck lost renomination to Jessica Bahmuller and Drew Peterson.

=== General election ===
1. District 18: Democrat Ryan Cwach was defeated in the general election by Republican Julie Auch.

== Summary of results by state house district ==
District	Incumbent	Party	Elected representative	Party
1	Jennifer Healy Keintz	Dem	Joe Donnell	Rep
1	Tamara St. John	Rep	Tamara St. John	Rep
2	Lana Greenfield	Rep	David Kull	Rep
2	Kaleb Weis (Note: Redistricted from district 2 to 3.)	Rep	John Sjaarda	Rep
3	Drew Dennert	Rep	Brandei Schaefbauer	Rep
3	Carl E. Perry	Rep	Carl E. Perry	Rep
4	Fred Deutsch	Rep	Fred Deutsch	Rep
4	John Mills (Note: Redistricted from district 4 to 8.)	Rep	Stephanie Sauder	Rep
5	Hugh Bartels	Rep	Hugh Bartels	Rep
5	Nancy York	Rep	Byron Callies	Rep
6	Aaron Aylward	Rep	Aaron Aylward	Rep
6	Ernie Otten Jr.	Rep	Ernie Otten Jr.	Rep
7	Tim Reed	Rep	Roger DeGroot	Rep
7	Larry Tidemann	Rep	Mellissa Heermann	Rep
8	Randy Gross (Note: Redistricted from district 8 to 25.)	Rep	John Mills	Rep
8	Marli Wiese	Rep	Tim Reisch	Rep
9	Rhonda Milstead	Rep	Kenneth Teunissen	Rep
9	Bethany Soye	Rep	Bethany Soye	Rep
10	Doug Barthel	Rep	Erin Healy (Note: Redistricted from district 14 to 10.)	Dem
10	Steven Haugaard	Rep	Kameron Nelson	Dem
11	Chris Karr	Rep	Chris Karr	Rep
11	Mark Willadsen	Rep	Brian Mulder	Rep
12	Arch Beal	Rep	Amber Arlint	Rep
12	Greg Jamison	Rep	Greg Jamison	Rep
13	Sue Peterson	Rep	Sue Peterson	Rep
13	Richard Thomason	Rep	Tony Venhuizen	Rep
14	Erin Healy	Dem	Tyler Tordsen	Rep
14	Taylor Rae Rehfeldt	Rep	Taylor Rae Rehfeldt	Rep
15	Linda Duba	Dem	Linda Duba	Dem
15	Jamie Smith	Dem	Kadyn Wittman	Dem
16	David Anderson	Rep	Karla Lems	Rep
16	Kevin Jensen	Rep	Kevin Jensen	Rep
17	Sydney Davis	Rep	Chris Kassin	Rep
17	Richard Vasgaard (Note: Redistricted from district 17 to 16.)	Rep	William Shorma	Rep
18	Ryan Cwach	Dem	Julie Auch	Rep
18	Mike Stevens	Rep	Mike Stevens	Rep
19	Marty Overweg (Note: Redistricted from district 19 to 21.)	Rep	Jessica Bahmuller	Rep
19	Kent Peterson	Rep	Drew Peterson	Rep
20	Lance Koth	Rep	Lance Koth	Rep
20	Paul Miskimins	Rep	Ben Krohmer	Rep
21	Rocky Blare	Rep	Rocky Blare	Rep
21	Caleb Finck (Note: Redistricted from district 21 to 19.)	Rep	Marty Overweg	Rep
22	Roger D. Chase	Rep	Roger D. Chase	Rep
22	Lynn Schneider	Rep	Lynn Schneider	Rep
23	Spencer Gosch	Rep	Scott Moore	Rep
23	Charles Hoffman	Rep	James Wangsness	Rep
24	Will Mortenson	Rep	Will Mortenson	Rep
24	Mike Weisgram	Rep	Mike Weisgram	Rep
25	Jon Hansen	Rep	Jon Hansen	Rep
25	Tom Pischke	Rep	Randy Gross	Rep
26A	Shawn Bordeaux	Dem	Eric Emery	Dem
26B	Rebecca Reimer	Rep	Rebecca Reimer	Rep
27	Liz May	Rep	Liz May	Rep
27	Peri Pourier	Dem	Peri Pourier	Dem
28A	Oren Lesmeister	Dem	Oren Lesmeister	Dem
28B	Sam Marty	Rep	Neal Pinnow	Rep
29	Kirk Chaffee	Rep	Kirk Chaffee	Rep
29	Dean Wink	Rep	Gary L. Cammack	Rep
30	Tim Goodwin	Rep	Dennis Krull	Rep
30	Trish Ladner	Rep	Trish Ladner	Rep
31	Mary Fitzgerald	Rep	Mary Fitzgerald	Rep
31	Scott Odenbach	Rep	Scott Odenbach	Rep
32	Becky Drury	Rep	Becky Drury	Rep
32	Chris P. Johnson	Rep	Steve Duffy	Rep
33	Taffy Howard	Rep	Curt Massie	Rep
33	Phil Jensen	Rep	Phil Jensen	Rep
34	Mike Derby	Rep	Mike Derby	Rep
34	Jess Olson	Rep	Jess Olson	Rep
35	Tina Mulally	Rep	Tina Mulally	Rep
35	Tony Randolph	Rep	Tony Randolph	Rep

Primary election results source:

General election results source:

== Detailed results ==
Primary election results source:

General election results source:

- Note: If a primary election is not listed, then there was not a competitive primary in that district (i.e., every candidate who ran in the primary advanced to the general election).

=== District 1 ===
General election

South Dakota's 1st House of Representatives District general election, 2022
Party	Candidate	Votes	%
Republican	Tamara St. John (incumbent)	5,726	31.76%
Republican	Joe Donnell	5,138	28.50%
Democratic	Steven D. McCleerey	3,974	22.04%
Democratic	Kay F. Nikolas	3,191	17.70%
Total votes		18,029	100.00%
Republican hold			
Republican gain from Democratic			

=== District 2 ===
Republican primary

South Dakota's 2nd House of Representatives District Republican primary election, 2022
Party	Candidate	Votes	%
Republican	John Sjaarda	1,571	34.29%
Republican	David Kull	1,180	25.76%
Republican	Jake Schoenbeck	1,100	24.01%
Republican	Jeffrey Lloyd Shawd	730	15.94%
Total votes		4,581	100.00%

General election

South Dakota's 2nd House of Representatives District general election, 2022
Party	Candidate	Votes	%
Republican	David Kull	6,121	40.44%
Republican	John Sjaarda	5,693	37.61%
Democratic	Gary Leighton	3,323	21.95%
Total votes		15,137	100.00%
Republican hold			
Republican hold			

=== District 3 ===
Republican primary

South Dakota's 3rd House of Representatives District Republican primary election, 2022
Party	Candidate	Votes	%
Republican	Carl E. Perry (incumbent)	1,606	30.22%
Republican	Brandei Schaefbauer	1,327	24.97%
Republican	Richard Rylance	1,264	23.78%
Republican	Kaleb W. Weis (incumbent)	1,118	21.03%
Total votes		5,315	100.00%

General election

South Dakota's 3rd House of Representatives District general election, 2022
Party	Candidate	Votes	%
Republican	Carl E. Perry (incumbent)	5,050	52.20%
Republican	Brandei Schaefbauer	4,625	47.80%
Total votes		9,675	100.00%
Republican hold			
Republican hold			

=== District 4 ===
Republican primary

South Dakota's 4th House of Representatives District Republican primary election, 2022
Party	Candidate	Votes	%
Republican	Stephanie Sauder	2,229	31.25%
Republican	Fred Deutsch (incumbent)	2,170	30.43%
Republican	Val Rausch	1,677	23.51%
Republican	Adam Grimm	1,056	14.81%
Total votes		7,132	100.00%

General election

South Dakota's 4th House of Representatives District general election, 2022
Party	Candidate	Votes	%
Republican	Fred Deutsch (incumbent)	6,977	52.55%
Republican	Stephanie Sauder	6,300	47.45%
Total votes		13,277	100.00%
Republican hold			
Republican hold			

=== District 5 ===
General election

South Dakota's 5th House of Representatives District general election, 2022
Party	Candidate	Votes	%
Republican	Hugh M. Bartels (incumbent)	6,058	45.46%
Republican	Byron I. Callies	4,351	32.65%
Democratic	Kahden Mooney	2,917	21.89%
Total votes		13,326	100.00%
Republican hold			
Republican hold			

=== District 6 ===
General election

South Dakota's 6th House of Representatives District general election, 2022
Party	Candidate	Votes	%
Republican	Ernie Otten (incumbent)	5,559	59.94%
Republican	Aaron Aylward (incumbent)	3,715	40.06%
Total votes		9,274	100.00%
Republican hold			
Republican hold			

=== District 7 ===
Republican primary

South Dakota's 7th House of Representatives District Republican primary election, 2022
Party	Candidate	Votes	%
Republican	Mellissa Heermann	1,280	31.43%
Republican	Roger DeGroot	1,245	30.57%
Republican	Doug Post	1,184	29.08%
Republican	Matt Doyle	363	8.91%
Total votes		4,072	100.00%

General election

South Dakota's 7th House of Representatives District general election, 2022
Party	Candidate	Votes	%
Republican	Roger DeGroot	4,980	38.69%
Republican	Mellissa Heermann	4,461	34.66%
Democratic	Cole Sartell	3,431	26.65%
Total votes		12,872	100.00%
Republican hold			
Republican hold			

=== District 8 ===
Republican primary

South Dakota's 8th House of Representatives District Republican primary election, 2022
Party	Candidate	Votes	%
Republican	Tim Reisch	3,188	52.39%
Republican	John Mills (incumbent)	1,878	30.86%
Republican	Lecia Summerer	1,019	16.75%
Total votes		6,085	100.00%

General election

South Dakota's 8th House of Representatives District general election, 2022
Party	Candidate	Votes	%
Republican	Tim Reisch	7,002	52.07%
Republican	John Mills (incumbent)	6,445	47.93%
Total votes		13,447	100.00%
Republican hold			
Republican hold			

=== District 9 ===
Republican primary

South Dakota's 9th House of Representatives District Republican primary election, 2022
Party	Candidate	Votes	%
Republican	Bethany Soye (incumbent)	1,268	38.69%
Republican	Kenneth Teunissen	1,039	31.71%
Republican	Jesse Fonkert	970	29.60%
Total votes		3,277	100.00%

General election

South Dakota's 9th House of Representatives District general election, 2022
Party	Candidate	Votes	%
Republican	Bethany Soye (incumbent)	5,034	40.73%
Republican	Kenneth Teunissen	4,142	33.51%
Democratic	Nick Winkler	3,183	25.75%
Total votes		12,359	100.00%
Republican hold			
Republican hold			

=== District 10 ===
General election

South Dakota's 10th House of Representatives District general election, 2022
Party	Candidate	Votes	%
Democratic	Erin Healy (incumbent)	4,613	32.45%
Democratic	Kameron Nelson	3,510	24.69%
Republican	John G. Mogen	3,114	21.90%
Republican	Tom E. Sutton	2,980	20.96%
Total votes		14,217	100.00%
Democratic gain from Republican			
Democratic gain from Republican			

=== District 11 ===
Republican primary

South Dakota's 11th House of Representatives District Republican primary election, 2022
Party	Candidate	Votes	%
Republican	Chris Karr (incumbent)	1,334	35.56%
Republican	Brian K. Mulder	1,230	32.79%
Republican	Roger Russell	1,006	26.82%
Republican	Tyler Bonynge	181	4.83%
Total votes		3,751	100.00%

Democratic primary

South Dakota's 11th House of Representatives District Democratic primary election, 2022
Party	Candidate	Votes	%
Democratic	Margaret Kuipers	766	35.19%
Democratic	Kim Parke	741	34.04%
Democratic	Stephanie Lynn Marty	670	30.78%
Total votes		2,177	100.00%

General election

South Dakota's 11th House of Representatives District general election, 2022
Party	Candidate	Votes	%
Republican	Brian K. Mulder	4,988	29.01%
Republican	Chris Karr (incumbent)	4,879	28.37%
Democratic	Margaret Kuipers	3,775	21.95%
Democratic	Kim Parke	3,553	20.66%
Total votes		17,195	100.00%
Republican hold			
Republican hold			

=== District 12 ===
Republican primary

South Dakota's 12th House of Representatives District Republican primary election, 2022
Party	Candidate	Votes	%
Republican	Greg Jamison (incumbent)	1,197	27.99%
Republican	Amber Arlint	939	21.95%
Republican	Kerry Loudenslager	928	21.70%
Republican	Cole Heisey	721	16.86%
Republican	Gary Schuster	492	11.50%
Total votes		4,277	100.00%

General election

South Dakota's 12th House of Representatives District general election, 2022
Party	Candidate	Votes	%
Republican	Greg Jamison (incumbent)	4,674	28.45%
Republican	Amber Arlint	4,651	28.31%
Democratic	Erin Royer	3,626	22.07%
Democratic	Kristin Hayward	3,479	21.17%
Total votes		16,430	100.00%
Republican hold			
Republican hold			

=== District 13 ===
Republican primary

South Dakota's 13th House of Representatives District Republican primary election, 2022
Party	Candidate	Votes	%
Republican	Tony Venhuizen	2,226	37.17%
Republican	Sue Peterson (incumbent)	1,911	31.91%
Republican	Richard L. Thomason (incumbent)	1,276	21.31%
Republican	Penny BayBridge	576	9.62%
Total votes		5,989	100.00%

General election

South Dakota's 13th House of Representatives District general election, 2022
Party	Candidate	Votes	%
Republican	Sue Peterson (incumbent)	5,879	50.00%
Republican	Tony Venhuizen	5,879	50.00%
Total votes		11,758	100.00%
Republican hold			
Republican hold			

=== District 14 ===
Republican primary

South Dakota's 14th House of Representatives District Republican primary election, 2022
Party	Candidate	Votes	%
Republican	Taylor Rae Rehfeldt (incumbent)	2,125	46.96%
Republican	Tyler Tordsen	1,469	32.46%
Republican	Gina M. Schiferl	931	20.57%
Total votes		4,525	100.00%

General election

South Dakota's 14th House of Representatives District general election, 2022
Party	Candidate	Votes	%
Republican	Taylor Rae Rehfeldt (incumbent)	6,127	30.68%
Republican	Tyler Tordsen	5,111	25.59%
Democratic	Mike Huber	4,570	22.89%
Democratic	Wendy Mamer	4,161	20.84%
Total votes		19,969	100.00%
Republican hold			
Republican gain from Democratic			

=== District 15 ===
General election

South Dakota's 15th House of Representatives District general election, 2022
Party	Candidate	Votes	%
Democratic	Linda Duba (incumbent)	3,545	28.14%
Democratic	Kadyn Wittman	3,194	25.36%
Republican	Joni Tschetter	3,097	24.59%
Republican	Matt Rosburg	2,761	21.92%
Total votes		12,597	100.00%
Democratic hold			
Democratic hold			

=== District 16 ===
Republican primary

South Dakota's 16th House of Representatives District Republican primary election, 2022
Party	Candidate	Votes	%
Republican	Karla J. Lems	1,848	35.56%
Republican	Kevin D. Jensen (incumbent)	1,733	33.35%
Republican	Richard Vasgaard (incumbent)	1,616	31.09%
Total votes		5,197	100.00%

General election

South Dakota's 16th House of Representatives District general election, 2022
Party	Candidate	Votes	%
Republican	Karla J. Lems	5,951	40.98%
Republican	Kevin D. Jensen (incumbent)	5,825	40.12%
Democratic	Matt Ness	2,744	18.90%
Total votes		14,520	100.00%
Republican hold			
Republican hold			

=== District 17 ===
General election

South Dakota's 17th House of Representatives District general election, 2022
Party	Candidate	Votes	%
Republican	Chris Kassin	4,938	39.26%
Republican	William "Bill" Shorma	4,055	32.24%
Democratic	Rebecca "Bekki" Engquist-Schroeder	3,586	28.51%
Total votes		12,579	100.00%
Republican hold			
Republican hold			

=== District 18 ===
General election

South Dakota's 18th House of Representatives District general election, 2022
Party	Candidate	Votes	%
Republican	Mike Stevens (incumbent)	5,228	32.08%
Republican	Julie Auch	4,664	28.62%
Democratic	Ryan D. Cwach (incumbent)	4,509	27.67%
Democratic	Jay Williams	1,895	11.63%
Total votes		16,296	100.00%
Republican hold			
Republican gain from Democratic			

=== District 19 ===
Republican primary

South Dakota's 19th House of Representatives District Republican primary election, 2022
Party	Candidate	Votes	%
Republican	Jessica Bahmuller	2,229	30.21%
Republican	Drew Peterson	1,660	22.50%
Republican	Caleb Finck (incumbent)	1,512	20.49%
Republican	Michael Boyle	1,465	19.85%
Republican	Roger Hofer	513	6.95%
Total votes		7,379	100.00%

General election

South Dakota's 19th House of Representatives District general election, 2022
Party	Candidate	Votes	%
Republican	Drew Peterson	6,323	53.05%
Republican	Jessica Bahmuller	5,596	46.95%
Total votes		11,919	100.00%
Republican hold			
Republican hold			

=== District 20 ===
Republican primary

South Dakota's 20th House of Representatives District Republican primary election, 2022
Party	Candidate	Votes	%
Republican	Ben Krohmer	1,882	34.85%
Republican	Lance Koth (incumbent)	1,819	33.69%
Republican	Jeff Bathke	1,699	31.46%
Total votes		5,400	100.00%

General election

South Dakota's 20th House of Representatives District general election, 2022
Party	Candidate	Votes	%
Republican	Lance Koth (incumbent)	5,721	53.50%
Republican	Ben Krohmer	4,972	46.50%
Total votes		10,693	100.00%
Republican hold			
Republican hold			

=== District 21 ===
General election

South Dakota's 21st House of Representatives District general election, 2022
Party	Candidate	Votes	%
Republican	Marty Overweg (incumbent)	6,154	52.80%
Republican	Rocky Blare (incumbent)	5,501	47.20%
Total votes		11,655	100.00%
Republican hold			
Republican hold			

=== District 22 ===
General election

South Dakota's 22nd House of Representatives District general election, 2022
Party	Candidate	Votes	%
Republican	Lynn Schneider (incumbent)	5,642	43.72%
Republican	Roger Chase (incumbent)	4,934	38.24%
Democratic	Shane Milne	2,328	18.04%
Total votes		12,904	100.00%
Republican hold			
Republican hold			

=== District 23 ===
Republican primary

South Dakota's 23rd House of Representatives District Republican primary election, 2022
Party	Candidate	Votes	%
Republican	Scott Moore	3,421	41.74%
Republican	James D. Wangsness	2,867	34.98%
Republican	Gregory Brooks	1,248	15.23%
Republican	Brandon Black	660	8.05%
Total votes		8,196	100.00%

General election

South Dakota's 23rd House of Representatives District general election, 2022
Party	Candidate	Votes	%
Republican	Scott Moore	6,965	58.74%
Republican	James D. Wangsness	4,893	41.26%
Total votes		11,858	100.00%
Republican hold			
Republican hold			

=== District 24 ===
Republican primary

South Dakota's 24th House of Representatives District Republican primary election, 2022
Party	Candidate	Votes	%
Republican	Will D. Mortenson (incumbent)	3,880	34.48%
Republican	Mike Weisgram (incumbent)	3,420	30.39%
Republican	Mary Weinheimer	2,787	24.76%
Republican	Jim Sheehan	1,167	10.37%
Total votes		11,254	100.00%

General election

South Dakota's 24th House of Representatives District general election, 2022
Party	Candidate	Votes	%
Republican	Will D. Mortenson (incumbent)	7,873	53.49%
Republican	Mike Weisgram (incumbent)	6,847	46.51%
Total votes		14,720	100.00%
Republican hold			
Republican hold			

=== District 25 ===
General election

South Dakota's 25th House of Representatives District general election, 2022
Party	Candidate	Votes	%
Republican	Jon Hansen (incumbent)	6,733	33.85%
Republican	Randy Gross (incumbent)	6,364	31.99%
Democratic	Dan Ahlers	4,535	22.80%
Democratic	David Kills A Hundred	2,260	11.36%
Total votes		19,892	100.00%
Republican hold			
Republican hold			

=== District 26A ===
Republican primary

South Dakota's 26A House of Representatives District Republican primary election, 2022
Party	Candidate	Votes	%
Republican	Joyce Glynn	277	55.40%
Republican	Ron Frederick	223	44.60%
Total votes		500	100.00%

Democratic primary

South Dakota's 26A House of Representatives District Democratic primary election, 2022
Party	Candidate	Votes	%
Democratic	Eric Emery	343	55.86%
Democratic	Alexandra Frederick	271	44.14%
Total votes		614	100.00%

General election

South Dakota's 26A House of Representatives District general election, 2022
Party	Candidate	Votes	%
Democratic	Eric Emery	1,761	66.88%
Republican	Joyce Glynn	872	33.12%
Total votes		2,633	100.00%
Democratic hold			

=== District 26B ===
General election

South Dakota's 26B House of Representatives District general election, 2022
Party	Candidate	Votes	%
Republican	Rebecca Reimer (incumbent)	2,955	100.00%
Total votes		2,955	100.00%
Republican hold			

=== District 27 ===
General election

South Dakota's 27th House of Representatives District general election, 2022
Party	Candidate	Votes	%
Democratic	Peri Pourier (incumbent)	3,069	28.96%
Republican	Liz May (incumbent)	2,831	26.71%
Democratic	Norma Rendon	2,350	22.17%
Republican	Bud May	2,349	22.16%
Total votes		10,599	100.00%
Democratic hold			
Republican hold			

=== District 28A ===
General election

South Dakota's 28A House of Representatives District general election, 2022
Party	Candidate	Votes	%
Democratic	Oren L. Lesmeister (incumbent)	1,890	50.58%
Republican	Ralph Lyon	1,847	49.42%
Total votes		3,737	100.00%
Democratic hold			

=== District 28B ===
Republican primary

South Dakota's 28B House of Representatives District Republican primary election, 2022
Party	Candidate	Votes	%
Republican	Neal Pinnow	1,452	56.45%
Republican	Thomas J. Brunner	1,120	43.55%
Total votes		2,572	100.00%

General election

South Dakota's 28B House of Representatives District general election, 2022
Party	Candidate	Votes	%
Republican	Neal Pinnow	4,234	80.74%
Independent	Calvin Reilly	1,010	19.26%
Total votes		5,244	100.00%
Republican hold			

=== District 29 ===
Republican primary

South Dakota's 29th House of Representatives District Republican primary election, 2022
Party	Candidate	Votes	%
Republican	Kirk Chaffee (incumbent)	2,354	36.03%
Republican	Gary L. Cammack	2,104	32.21%
Republican	Kathy Rice	2,075	31.76%
Total votes		6,533	100.00%

General election

South Dakota's 29th House of Representatives District general election, 2022
Party	Candidate	Votes	%
Republican	Kirk Chaffee (incumbent)	5,996	44.90%
Republican	Gary L. Cammack	5,132	38.43%
Libertarian	Sean Natchke	2,227	16.68%
Total votes		14,720	100.00%
Republican hold			
Republican hold			

=== District 30 ===
Republican primary

South Dakota's 30th House of Representatives District Republican primary election, 2022
Party	Candidate	Votes	%
Republican	Dennis Krull	2,536	29.22%
Republican	Trish Ladner (incumbent)	2,133	24.58%
Republican	Patrick J. Baumann	2,040	23.51%
Republican	Lisa Gennaro	1,309	15.08%
Republican	Gerold F. Herrick	660	7.61%
Total votes		8,678	100.00%

General election

South Dakota's 30th House of Representatives District general election, 2022
Party	Candidate	Votes	%
Republican	Trish Ladner (incumbent)	8,309	43.36%
Republican	Dennis Krull	7,638	39.86%
Democratic	Bret Swanson	3,217	16.79%
Total votes		19,164	100.00%
Republican hold			
Republican hold			

=== District 31 ===
Republican primary

South Dakota's 31st House of Representatives District Republican primary election, 2022
Party	Candidate	Votes	%
Republican	Scott Odenbach (incumbent)	2,822	40.02%
Republican	Mary J. Fitzgerald (incumbent)	2,544	36.08%
Republican	Mistie Caldwell	1,685	23.90%
Total votes		7,051	100.00%

General election

South Dakota's 31st House of Representatives District general election, 2022
Party	Candidate	Votes	%
Republican	Scott Odenbach (incumbent)	7,230	54.17%
Republican	Mary J. Fitzgerald (incumbent)	6,116	45.83%
Total votes		13,346	100.00%
Republican hold			
Republican hold			

=== District 32 ===
Republican primary

South Dakota's 32nd House of Representatives District Republican primary election, 2022
Party	Candidate	Votes	%
Republican	Becky J. Drury (incumbent)	1,235	40.67%
Republican	Steve Duffy	1,167	38.43%
Republican	Jamie M. Giedd	635	20.91%
Total votes		3,037	100.00%

General election

South Dakota's 32nd House of Representatives District general election, 2022
Party	Candidate	Votes	%
Republican	Steve Duffy	3,374	26.89%
Republican	Becky J. Drury (incumbent)	3,230	25.74%
Democratic	Christine Stephenson	3,095	24.67%
Democratic	Jonathan M. Old Horse	2,848	22.70%
Total votes		12,547	100.00%
Republican hold			
Republican hold			

=== District 33 ===
Republican primary

South Dakota's 33rd House of Representatives District Republican primary election, 2022
Party	Candidate	Votes	%
Republican	Phil Jensen (incumbent)	2,300	30.39%
Republican	Curt Massie	1,885	24.90%
Republican	Dean Aurand	1,794	23.70%
Republican	Janette McIntyre	1,590	21.01%
Total votes		7,569	100.00%

General election

South Dakota's 33rd House of Representatives District general election, 2022
Party	Candidate	Votes	%
Republican	Phil Jensen (incumbent)	6,396	40.13%
Republican	Curt Massie	5,733	35.97%
Democratic	Vince Vidal	3,808	23.89%
Total votes		15,937	100.00%
Republican hold			
Republican hold			

=== District 34 ===
Republican primary

South Dakota's 34th House of Representatives District Republican primary election, 2022
Party	Candidate	Votes	%
Republican	Mike Derby (incumbent)	2,833	40.95%
Republican	Jess Olson (incumbent)	2,298	33.21%
Republican	Jodie Frye	1,788	25.84%
Total votes		6,919	100.00%

General election

South Dakota's 34th House of Representatives District general election, 2022
Party	Candidate	Votes	%
Republican	Mike Derby (incumbent)	6,350	32.79%
Republican	Jess Olson (incumbent)	5,869	30.30%
Democratic	Darla Drew	4,149	21.42%
Democratic	Jay Shultz	3,000	15.49%
Total votes		19,368	100.00%
Republican hold			
Republican hold			

=== District 35 ===
Republican primary

South Dakota's 35th House of Representatives District Republican primary election, 2022
Party	Candidate	Votes	%
Republican	Tony Randolph (incumbent)	1,320	31.10%
Republican	Tina L. Mulally (incumbent)	1,281	30.18%
Republican	Larry G. Larson	859	20.24%
Republican	Elizabeth Regalado	785	18.49%
Total votes		4,245	100.00%

General election

South Dakota's 35th House of Representatives District general election, 2022
Party	Candidate	Votes	%
Republican	Tina L. Mulally (incumbent)	5,908	35.74%
Republican	Tony Randolph (incumbent)	5,573	33.71%
Democratic	Pat Cromwell	2,647	16.01%
Democratic	David A. Hubbard	2,402	14.53%
Total votes		16,530	100.00%
Republican hold			
Republican hold			
