= List of South Dakota legislative districts =

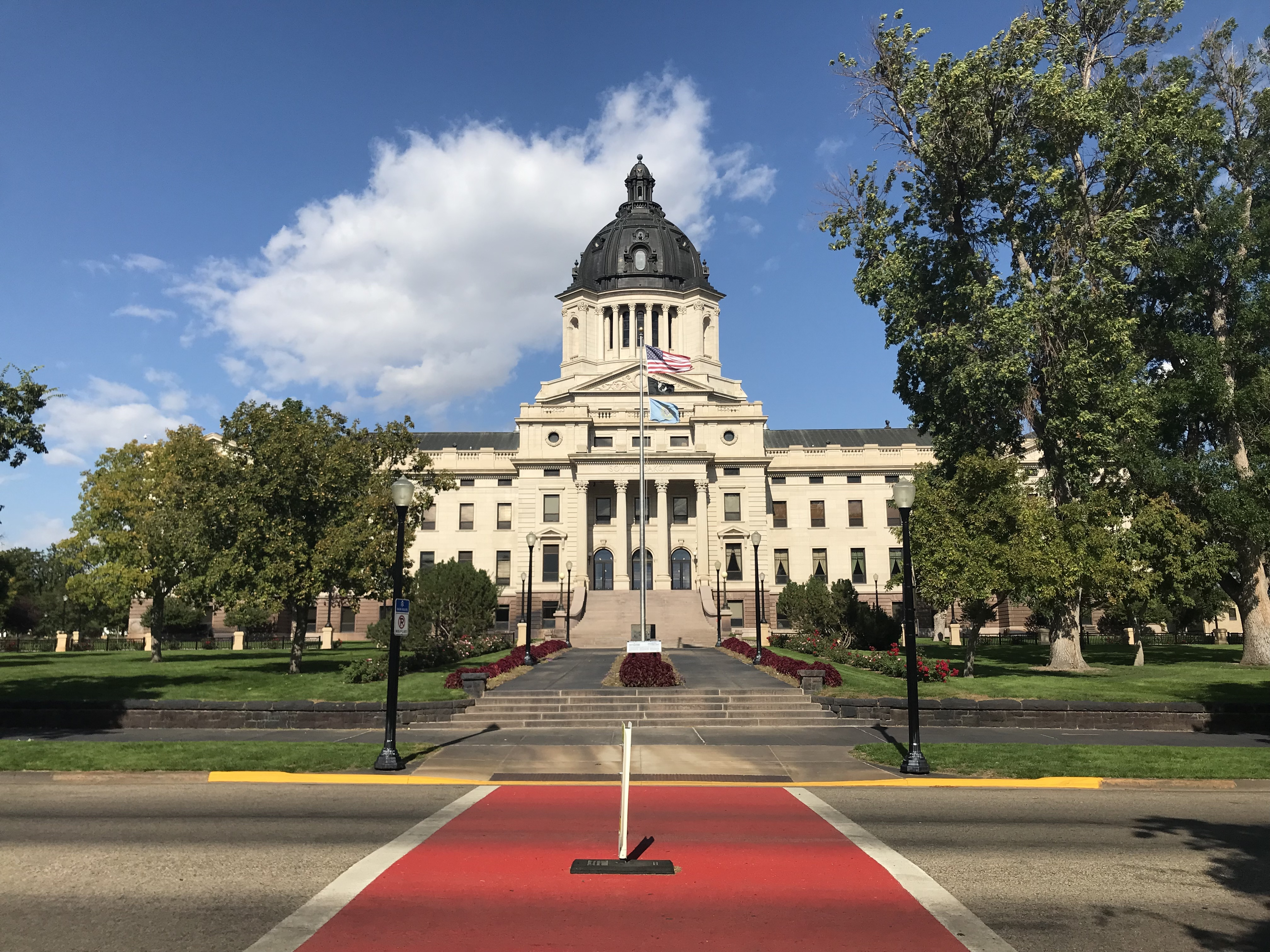
The South Dakota State Capitol in Pierre

Members of the South Dakota Legislature are elected from 35 districts, each of which elect one senator and two representatives. Members of both chambers serve two-year terms. All legislators are term limited to eight consecutive years in office, but can run again after two years or run for the opposite house than the one in which they serve.

== List of districts ==
The 35 legislative districts in South Dakota following redistricting after the 2020 United States census:

No.	Map	Counties	Senator	Representatives
1st		Brown; Day; Marshall; Roberts	Michael Rohl; Republican	Joe Donnell; Republican
1st		Brown; Day; Marshall; Roberts	Michael Rohl; Republican	Tamara St. John; Republican
2nd		Minnehaha	Steve Kolbeck; Republican	David Kull; Republican
2nd		Minnehaha	Steve Kolbeck; Republican	John Sjaarda; Republican
3rd		Brown	Al Novstrup; Republican	Brandei Schaefbauer; Republican
3rd		Brown	Al Novstrup; Republican	Carl E. Perry; Republican
4th		Clark; Codington; Deuel; Grant; Hamlin; Roberts	John Wiik; Republican	Stephanie Sauder; Republican
4th		Clark; Codington; Deuel; Grant; Hamlin; Roberts	John Wiik; Republican	Fred Deutsch; Republican
5th		Codington	Lee Schoenbeck; Republican	Hugh Bartels; Republican
5th		Codington	Lee Schoenbeck; Republican	Byron Callies; Republican
6th		Lincoln	Herman Otten; Republican	Aaron Aylward; Republican
6th		Lincoln	Herman Otten; Republican	Ernie Otten; Republican
7th		Brookings	Tim Reed; Republican	Mellissa Heermann; Republican
7th		Brookings	Tim Reed; Republican	Roger DeGroot; Republican
8th		Brookings; Kingsbury; Lake; Miner	Casey Crabtree; Republican	John Mills; Republican
8th		Brookings; Kingsbury; Lake; Miner	Casey Crabtree; Republican	Tim Reisch; Republican
9th		Minnehaha	Brent "B.R." Hoffman; Republican	Bethany Soye; Republican
9th		Minnehaha	Brent "B.R." Hoffman; Republican	Kenneth Teunissen; Republican
10th		Minnehaha	Liz Larson; Democratic	Erin Healy; Democratic
10th		Minnehaha	Liz Larson; Democratic	Kameron Nelson; Democratic
11th		Minnehaha	Jim Stalzer; Republican	Brian Mulder; Republican
11th		Minnehaha	Jim Stalzer; Republican	Chris Karr; Republican
12th		Lincoln; Minnehaha	Arch Beal; Republican	Amber Arlint; Republican
12th		Lincoln; Minnehaha	Arch Beal; Republican	Greg Jamison; Republican
13th		Lincoln; Minnehaha	Jack Kolbeck; Republican	Sue Peterson; Republican
13th		Lincoln; Minnehaha	Jack Kolbeck; Republican	Tony Venhuizen; Republican
14th		Minnehaha	Larry Zikmund; Republican	Taylor Rehfeldt; Republican
14th		Minnehaha	Larry Zikmund; Republican	Tyler Tordsen; Republican
15th		Minnehaha	Reynold Nesiba; Democratic	Kadyn Wittman; Democratic
15th		Minnehaha	Reynold Nesiba; Democratic	Linda Duba; Democratic
16th		Lincoln; Turner; Union	Jim Bolin; Republican	Karla Lems; Republican
16th		Lincoln; Turner; Union	Jim Bolin; Republican	Kevin Jensen; Republican
17th		Clay; Union	Sydney Davis; Republican	William Shorma; Republican
17th		Clay; Union	Sydney Davis; Republican	Chris Kassin; Republican
18th		Clay; Yankton	Jean Hunhoff; Republican	Mike Stevens; Republican
18th		Clay; Yankton	Jean Hunhoff; Republican	Julie Auch; Republican
19th		Bon Homme; Hanson; Hutchinson; McCook; Turner	Kyle Schoenfish; Republican	Drew Peterson; Republican
19th		Bon Homme; Hanson; Hutchinson; McCook; Turner	Kyle Schoenfish; Republican	Jessica Bahmuller; Republican
20th		Davison; Jerauld; Miner; Sanborn	Joshua Klumb; Republican	Lance Koth; Republican
20th		Davison; Jerauld; Miner; Sanborn	Joshua Klumb; Republican	Ben Krohmer; Republican
21st		Aurora; Charles Mix; Douglas; Gregory; Tripp	Erin Tobin; Republican	Rocky Blare; Republican
21st		Aurora; Charles Mix; Douglas; Gregory; Tripp	Erin Tobin; Republican	Marty Overweg; Republican
22nd		Beadle; Clark; Spink	David Wheeler; Republican	Roger D. Chase; Republican
22nd		Beadle; Clark; Spink	David Wheeler; Republican	Lynn Schneider; Republican
23rd		Brown; Campbell; Edmunds; Faulk; Hand; McPherson; Potter; Walworth	Bryan Breitling; Republican	James D. Wangsness; Republican
23rd		Brown; Campbell; Edmunds; Faulk; Hand; McPherson; Potter; Walworth	Bryan Breitling; Republican	Scott Moore; Republican
24th		Haakon; Hughes; Hyde; Stanley; Sully	Jim Mehlhaff; Republican	Will Mortenson; Republican
24th		Haakon; Hughes; Hyde; Stanley; Sully	Jim Mehlhaff; Republican	Mike Weisgram; Republican
25th		Minnehaha; Moody	Tom Pischke; Republican	Randy Gross; Republican
25th		Minnehaha; Moody	Tom Pischke; Republican	Jon Hansen; Republican
26A		Jones; Mellette; Todd	Shawn Bordeaux; Democratic	Eric Emery; Democratic
26B		Brule; Buffalo; Hughes; Hyde; Jones; Lyman	Shawn Bordeaux; Democratic	Rebecca Reimer; Republican
27th		Bennett; Jackson; Pennington; Oglala Lakota	Red Dawn Foster; Democratic	Liz May; Republican
27th		Bennett; Jackson; Pennington; Oglala Lakota	Red Dawn Foster; Democratic	Peri Pourier; Republican
28A		Corson; Dewey; Perkins; Ziebach	Ryan Maher; Republican	Oren Lesmeister; Democratic
28B		Butte; Harding; Perkins	Ryan Maher; Republican	Neil Pinnow; Republican
29th		Meade	Dean Wink; Republican	Gary Cammack; Republican
29th		Meade	Dean Wink; Republican	Kirk Chaffee; Republican
30th		Custer; Fall River; Pennington	Julie Frye-Mueller; Republican	Trish Ladner; Republican
30th		Custer; Fall River; Pennington	Julie Frye-Mueller; Republican	Dennis Krull; Republican
31st		Lawrence	Randy Deibert; Republican	Mary Fitzgerald; Republican
31st		Lawrence	Randy Deibert; Republican	Scott Odenbach; Republican
32nd		Pennington	Helene Duhamel; Republican	Becky Drury; Republican
32nd		Pennington	Helene Duhamel; Republican	Steve Duffy; Republican
33rd		Meade; Pennington	David Johnson; Republican	Curt Massie; Republican
33rd		Meade; Pennington	David Johnson; Republican	Phil Jensen; Republican
34th		Pennington	Michael Diedrich; Republican	Mike Derby; Republican
34th		Pennington	Michael Diedrich; Republican	Vacant
35th		Pennington	Vacant	Tina Mulally; Republican
35th		Pennington	Vacant	Tony Randolph; Republican
