= 2020 South Dakota House of Representatives election =

- November 3, 2020

All 70 Seats in the South Dakota House of Representatives 36 seats needed for a majority
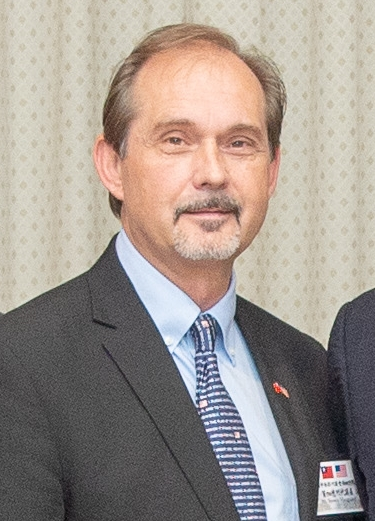

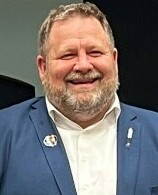
| | Majority party | Minority party |
|---|---|---|
| Leader | Steven Haugaard | Jamie Smith |
| Party | Republican | Democratic |
| Leader's seat | 10th District | 15th District |
| Seats before | 59 | 11 |
| Seats after | 62 | 8 |
| Seat change | ▲3 | ▼3 |
| Popular vote | 430,885 | 166,484 |
| Percentage | 71.75% | 27.72% |
- Results: Republican gain Republican hold Democratic hold
Speaker before election
Steve Haugaard
Republican
Elected Speaker
Spencer Gosch
Republican

Elections to the South Dakota House of Representatives were held on November 3, 2020, as a part of the biennial elections in the U.S. state of South Dakota. All 70 seats were up for re-election. Each of the 70 seats are subdivided in two single-member districts.

Primary elections were held on June 2, 2020.

== Predictions ==
| Source | Ranking | As of |
|---|---|---|
| The Cook Political Report | Safe R | October 21, 2020 |

== Results ==
=== District 1 ===
South Dakota House of Representatives District 1 general election
| Party | Candidate | Votes | % |
|---|---|---|---|
| Republican | Tamara St. John (incumbent) | 6,150 | 41.27% |
| Democratic | Jennifer Healy Keintz | 4,502 | 30.21% |
| Democratic | Steven McCleerey (incumbent) | 4,248 | 28.51% |
| Total votes | | 14,901 | 100.0% |
| Republican hold | | | |
| Democratic hold | | | |

=== District 2 ===
South Dakota House of Representatives District 2 general election
| Party | Candidate | Votes | % |
|---|---|---|---|
| Republican | Lana Greenfield (incumbent) | 6,428 | 50.18% |
| Republican | Kaleb Weis (incumbent) | 6,381 | 49.82% |
| Total votes | | 12,809 | 100.0% |
| Republican hold | | | |
| Republican hold | | | |

=== District 3 ===
South Dakota House of Representatives District 3 general election
| Party | Candidate | Votes | % |
|---|---|---|---|
| Republican | Drew Dennert (incumbent) | 7,108 | 34.24% |
| Republican | Carl E. Perry (incumbent) | 6,087 | 29.32% |
| Democratic | Leslie McLaughlin | 3,843 | 18.51% |
| Democratic | Justin Roemmick | 3,720 | 17.92% |
| Total votes | | 20,758 | 100.0% |

=== District 4 ===
South Dakota House of Representatives District 4 general election
| Party | Candidate | Votes | % |
|---|---|---|---|
| Republican | Fred Deutsch (incumbent) | 8,012 | 42.95% |
| Republican | John Mills | 7,001 | 37.53% |
| Democratic | Becky Holtquist | 3,642 | 19.52% |
| Total votes | | 18,655 | 100.0% |
| Republican hold | | | |
| Republican hold | | | |

=== District 5 ===
South Dakota House of Representatives District 5 general election
| Party | Candidate | Votes | % |
|---|---|---|---|
| Republican | Hugh Bartels (incumbent) | 7,311 | 54.18% |
| Republican | Nancy York (incumbent) | 6,182 | 45.82% |
| Total votes | | 13,493 | 100.0% |
| Republican hold | | | |
| Republican hold | | | |

=== District 6 ===
South Dakota House of Representatives District 6 general election
| Party | Candidate | Votes | % |
|---|---|---|---|
| Republican | Ernie Otten | 9,504 | 45.06% |
| Republican | Aaron Aylward | 6,504 | 30.84% |
| Democratic | Cody Ingle | 5,084 | 24.10% |
| Total votes | | 21,092 | 100.0% |
| Republican hold | | | |
| Republican hold | | | |

=== District 7 ===
South Dakota House of Representatives District 7 general election
| Party | Candidate | Votes | % |
|---|---|---|---|
| Republican | Tim Reed (incumbent) | 5,821 | 33.31% |
| Republican | Larry Tidemann | 5,235 | 29.95% |
| Democratic | Louise Snodgrass | 3,635 | 20.80% |
| Democratic | Bill Adamson | 2,786 | 15.94% |
| Total votes | | 17,477 | 100.0% |
| Republican hold | | | |
| Republican hold | | | |

=== District 8 ===
South Dakota House of Representatives District 8 general election
| Party | Candidate | Votes | % |
|---|---|---|---|
| Republican | Marli Wiese (incumbent) | 7,029 | 35.54% |
| Republican | Randy Gross (incumbent) | 6,327 | 31.99% |
| Democratic | Val Parsley | 4,260 | 21.54% |
| Democratic | John P. Kessinger | 2,162 | 10.93% |
| Total votes | | 19,778 | 100.0% |
| Republican hold | | | |
| Republican hold | | | |

=== District 9 ===
South Dakota House of Representatives District 9 general election
| Party | Candidate | Votes | % |
|---|---|---|---|
| Republican | Rhonda Milstead (incumbent) | 7,656 | 32.69% |
| Republican | Bethany Soye | 6,720 | 28.69% |
| Democratic | Michael Saba (incumbent) | 4,679 | 19.98% |
| Democratic | Toni Miller | 4,368 | 18.65% |
| Total votes | | 23,423 | 100.0% |
| Republican hold | | | |
| Republican gain from Democratic | | | |

=== District 10 ===
South Dakota House of Representatives District 10 general election
| Party | Candidate | Votes | % |
|---|---|---|---|
| Republican | Steven Haugaard (incumbent) | 6,527 | 37.40% |
| Republican | Doug Barthel (incumbent) | 6,188 | 35.46% |
| Democratic | Michelle L. Hentschel | 4,736 | 27.14% |
| Total votes | | 17,451 | 100.0% |
| Republican hold | | | |
| Republican hold | | | |

=== District 11 ===
South Dakota House of Representatives District 11 general election
| Party | Candidate | Votes | % |
|---|---|---|---|
| Republican | Chris Karr (incumbent) | 7,253 | 29.30% |
| Republican | Mark Willadsen (incumbent) | 7,172 | 28.97% |
| Democratic | Sheryl Johnson | 5,900 | 23.83% |
| Democratic | Margaret M Kuipers | 4,429 | 17.89% |
| Total votes | | 24,754 | 100.0% |
| Republican hold | | | |
| Republican hold | | | |

=== District 12 ===
South Dakota House of Representatives District 12 general election
| Party | Candidate | Votes | % |
|---|---|---|---|
| Republican | Greg Jamison | 6,799 | 37.82% |
| Republican | Arch Beal (incumbent) | 5,621 | 31.27% |
| Democratic | Erin Royer | 5,555 | 30.90% |
| Total votes | | 17,975 | 100.0% |
| Republican hold | | | |
| Republican hold | | | |

=== District 13 ===
South Dakota House of Representatives District 13 general election
| Party | Candidate | Votes | % |
|---|---|---|---|
| Republican | Sue Peterson (incumbent) | 6,746 | 28.22% |
| Republican | Richard Thomason | 6,215 | 26.00% |
| Democratic | Kelly Sullivan (incumbent) | 5,846 | 24.46% |
| Democratic | Norman B. Bliss | 5,094 | 21.31% |
| Total votes | | 23,901 | 100.0% |
| Republican hold | | | |
| Republican gain from Democratic | | | |

=== District 14 ===
South Dakota House of Representatives District 14 general election
| Party | Candidate | Votes | % |
|---|---|---|---|
| Republican | Taylor Rehfeldt | 6,933 | 28.49% |
| Democratic | Erin Healy (incumbent) | 6,388 | 26.25% |
| Republican | Tom Holmes | 5,782 | 23.76% |
| Democratic | Mike Huber | 5,228 | 21.49% |
| Total votes | | 24,331 | 100.0% |
| Republican hold | | | |
| Democratic hold | | | |

=== District 15 ===
South Dakota House of Representatives District 15 general election
| Party | Candidate | Votes | % |
|---|---|---|---|
| Democratic | Linda Duba (incumbent) | 3,918 | 28.86% |
| Democratic | Jamie Smith (incumbent) | 3,727 | 27.45% |
| Republican | Cole Heisey | 2,987 | 22.00% |
| Republican | Matt Rosburg | 2,943 | 21.68% |
| Total votes | | 13,575 | 100.0% |
| Democratic hold | | | |
| Democratic hold | | | |

=== District 16 ===
South Dakota House of Representatives District 16 general election
| Party | Candidate | Votes | % |
|---|---|---|---|
| Republican | David Anderson (incumbent) | 8,383 | 56.29% |
| Republican | Kevin Jensen (incumbent) | 6,510 | 43.71% |
| Total votes | | 14,893 | 100.0% |
| Republican hold | | | |
| Republican hold | | | |

=== District 17 ===
South Dakota House of Representatives District 17 general election
| Party | Candidate | Votes | % |
|---|---|---|---|
| Republican | Sydney Davis | 5,278 | 31.25% |
| Republican | Richard Vasgaard | 4,786 | 28.34% |
| Democratic | Al Leber | 3,645 | 21.58% |
| Democratic | Caitlin F. Collier | 3,181 | 18.83% |
| Total votes | | 16,890 | 100.0% |
| Republican hold | | | |
| Republican hold | | | |

=== District 18 ===
South Dakota House of Representatives District 18 general election
| Party | Candidate | Votes | % |
|---|---|---|---|
| Republican | Mike Stevens | 6,778 | 57.02% |
| Democratic | Ryan Cwach (incumbent) | 5,109 | 42.98% |
| Total votes | | 11,887 | 100.0% |
| Republican hold | | | |
| Democratic hold | | | |

=== District 19 ===
South Dakota House of Representatives District 19 general election
| Party | Candidate | Votes | % |
|---|---|---|---|
| Republican | Kent Peterson (incumbent) | 8,503 | 56.43.% |
| Republican | Marty Overweg (incumbent) | 6,564 | 43.57% |
| Total votes | | 15,057 | 100.0% |
| Republican hold | | | |
| Republican hold | | | |

=== District 20 ===
South Dakota House of Representatives District 20 general election
| Party | Candidate | Votes | % |
|---|---|---|---|
| Republican | Paul Miskimins (incumbent) | 7,403 | 54.97% |
| Republican | Lance Koth (incumbent) | 6,064 | 45.03% |
| Total votes | | 13,467 | 100.0% |
| Republican hold | | | |
| Republican hold | | | |

=== District 21 ===
South Dakota House of Representatives District 21 general election
| Party | Candidate | Votes | % |
|---|---|---|---|
| Republican | Rocky Blare | 6,330 | 44.33% |
| Republican | Caleb Finck (incumbent) | 5,038 | 35.28% |
| Democratic | Jessica Hegge | 2,911 | 20.39% |
| Total votes | | 14,279 | 100.0% |
| Republican hold | | | |
| Republican hold | | | |

=== District 22 ===
South Dakota House of Representatives District 22 general election
| Party | Candidate | Votes | % |
|---|---|---|---|
| Republican | Roger D. Chase (incumbent) | 6,165 | 36.25% |
| Republican | Lynn Schneider | 5,855 | 34.42% |
| Democratic | Mark S Smith | 2,640 | 15.52% |
| Democratic | C. John McEnelly | 2,348 | 13.81% |
| Total votes | | 17,008 | 100.0% |
| Republican hold | | | |
| Republican hold | | | |

=== District 23 ===
South Dakota House of Representatives District 23 general election
| Party | Candidate | Votes | % |
|---|---|---|---|
| Republican | Spencer Gosch (incumbent) | 8,325 | 55.07% |
| Republican | Charlie Hoffman | 6,791 | 44.93% |
| Total votes | | 15,116 | 100.0% |
| Republican hold | | | |
| Republican hold | | | |

=== District 24 ===
South Dakota House of Representatives District 24 general election
| Party | Candidate | Votes | % |
|---|---|---|---|
| Republican | Will Mortenson | 8,410 | 43.63% |
| Republican | Mike Weisgram | 7,786 | 40.39% |
| Democratic | Amanda Bachmann | 3,079 | 15.97% |
| Total votes | | 19,275 | 100.0% |
| Republican hold | | | |
| Republican hold | | | |

=== District 25 ===
South Dakota House of Representatives District 25 general election
| Party | Candidate | Votes | % |
|---|---|---|---|
| Republican | Jon Hansen (incumbent) | 7,826 | 32.90% |
| Republican | Tom Pischke (incumbent) | 7,784 | 32.72% |
| Democratic | Jeff Barth | 4,460 | 18.75% |
| Democratic | Jared Nieuwenhuis | 3,720 | 15.64% |
| Total votes | | 23,790 | 100.0% |
| Republican hold | | | |
| Republican hold | | | |

=== District 26A ===
South Dakota House of Representatives District 26A general election
| Party | Candidate | Votes | % |
|---|---|---|---|
| Democratic | Shawn Bordeaux (incumbent) | 2,254 | 100.0% |
| Total votes | | 2,254 | 100.0% |
| Democratic hold | | | |

=== District 26B ===
South Dakota House of Representatives District 26B general election
| Party | Candidate | Votes | % |
|---|---|---|---|
| Republican | Rebecca Reimer (incumbent) | 3,578 | 70.43% |
| Democratic | Tim Feliciano | 1,502 | 29.57% |
| Total votes | | 5,080 | 100.0% |
| Republican hold | | | |

=== District 27 ===
South Dakota House of Representatives District 27 general election
| Party | Candidate | Votes | % |
|---|---|---|---|
| Republican | Liz Marty May | 3,320 | 36.75% |
| Democratic | Peri Pourier (incumbent) | 3,234 | 35.80% |
| Democratic | Ernest Weston Jr. | 2,480 | 27.45% |
| Total votes | | 9,034 | 100.0% |
| Republican hold | | | |
| Democratic hold | | | |

=== District 28A ===
South Dakota House of Representatives District 28A general election
| Party | Candidate | Votes | % |
|---|---|---|---|
| Democratic | Oren Lesmeister (incumbent) | 2,585 | 100.0% |
| Total votes | | 2,585 | 100.0% |
| Democratic hold | | | |

=== District 28B ===
South Dakota House of Representatives District 28B general election
| Party | Candidate | Votes | % |
|---|---|---|---|
| Republican | J. Sam Marty (incumbent) | 4,847 | 100.0% |
| Total votes | | 4,847 | 100.0% |
| Republican hold | | | |

=== District 29 ===
South Dakota House of Representatives District 29 general election
| Party | Candidate | Votes | % |
|---|---|---|---|
| Republican | Dean Wink | 8,167 | 46.08% |
| Republican | Kirk Chaffee (incumbent) | 6,381 | 36.01% |
| Independent | Jade Addison | 3,174 | 17.91% |
| Total votes | | 17,722 | 100.0% |
| Republican hold | | | |
| Republican hold | | | |

=== District 30 ===
South Dakota House of Representatives District 30 general election
| Party | Candidate | Votes | % |
|---|---|---|---|
| Republican | Trish Ladner | 8,668 | 50.68% |
| Republican | Tim Goodwin (incumbent) | 8,435 | 49.32% |
| Total votes | | 17,103 | 100.0% |
| Republican hold | | | |
| Republican hold | | | |

=== District 31 ===
South Dakota House of Representatives District 31 general election
| Party | Candidate | Votes | % |
|---|---|---|---|
| Republican | Scott Odenbach | 8,104 | 41.32% |
| Republican | Mary Fitzgerald | 6,920 | 35.28% |
| Democratic | Brooke Abdallah | 4,590 | 23.40% |
| Total votes | | 19,614 | 100.0% |
| Republican hold | | | |
| Republican hold | | | |

=== District 32 ===
South Dakota House of Representatives District 32 general election
| Party | Candidate | Votes | % |
|---|---|---|---|
| Republican | Chris P. Johnson (incumbent) | 6,391 | 32.38% |
| Republican | Becky Drury | 5,587 | 28.31% |
| Democratic | James Preston | 3,932 | 19.92% |
| Democratic | Toni Diamond | 3,826 | 19.39% |
| Total votes | | 19,736 | 100.0% |
| Republican hold | | | |
| Republican hold | | | |

=== District 33 ===
South Dakota House of Representatives District 33 general election
| Party | Candidate | Votes | % |
|---|---|---|---|
| Republican | Phil Jensen | 10,251 | 56.47% |
| Republican | Taffy Howard (incumbent) | 7,902 | 43.53% |
| Total votes | | 18,153 | 100.0% |
| Republican hold | | | |
| Republican hold | | | |

=== District 34 ===
South Dakota House of Representatives District 34 general election
| Party | Candidate | Votes | % |
|---|---|---|---|
| Republican | Mike Derby | 7,225 | 33.51% |
| Republican | Jess Olson (incumbent) | 6,756 | 31.33% |
| Democratic | Rick Stracqualursi | 3,806 | 17.65% |
| Democratic | Nick Anderson | 3,776 | 17.51% |
| Total votes | | 21,563 | 100.0% |
| Republican hold | | | |
| Republican hold | | | |

=== District 35 ===
South Dakota House of Representatives District 35 general election
| Party | Candidate | Votes | % |
|---|---|---|---|
| Republican | Tina Mulally (incumbent) | 5,777 | 34.37% |
| Republican | Tony Randolph (incumbent) | 5,375 | 31.98% |
| Democratic | David A. Hubbard | 2,916 | 17.35% |
| Democratic | Pat Cromwell | 2,740 | 16.30% |
| Total votes | | 16,808 | 100.0% |
| Republican hold | | | |
| Republican hold | | | |
