= Kristin Conzet =

American politician (born 1970)

Member of the South Dakota House of Representatives from the 32nd district
- Incumbent
- Assumed office February 10, 2024 Serving with Steve Duffy
- Preceded by: Becky Drury
- In office December 3, 2009 – January 8, 2019
- Preceded by: Brian Dreyer
- Succeeded by: Chris P. Johnson

Personal details
- Born: November 18, 1970 (age 55)
- Party: Republican
- Education: University of South Dakota

Kristin A. Conzet (born November 18, 1970) is an American politician and a Republican member of the South Dakota House of Representatives representing District 32 since her appointment in February 2024. She previously represented the district from 2009 to 2019.

== Elections ==
2024 Conzet was appointed for South Dakota House of Representatives for District 32 by Governor Kristi Noem.

- 2012: Conzet ran in the three-way June 5, 2012 Republican Primary and placed second with 1,148 votes (37.4%); in the three-way November 6, 2012 General election, Conzet took the first seat with 5,004 votes (36.21%) and incumbent Representative Brian Gosch took the second seat ahead of Democratic nominee Jackie Swanson.
- 2010: Conzet was appointed to the South Dakota House in December 2009 when incumbent District 32 Republican Representative Brian Dreyer left the Legislature. Subsequently, Conzet and fellow incumbent Representative Brian Gosch were unopposed for the June 8, 2010 Republican Primary and won the four-way November 2, 2010 General election, where Representative Gosch took the first seat and Conzet took the second seat with 4,221 votes (31.05%) ahead of Independent candidates Mathew Murray and Jeanette Deurloo.
