= Milstead (disambiguation) =

Milstead is a village in Kent, England.

It may also refer to:

== People ==
- Adam Milstead (born 1987), American MMA fighter
- Century Milstead (1901–1963), American football player
- Charlie Milstead (1937–2022), American football player
- Divine (performer) (born Harris Glenn Milstead, 1945–1988), American actor, singer, and drag queen
- George Milstead (1903–1977), American baseball player
- Rhonda Milstead (born 1957), American politician and businesswoman
- Rod Milstead (born 1969), American football player and coach
- Violet Milstead (1919–2014), Canadian aviator

== Places ==
- Milstead, Alabama, United States
- Milstead, Georgia, United States
