= South Dakota's 28th legislative district =

American legislative district

South Dakota's 28th State Senate district

South Dakota's 28th legislative district is one of 35 districts in the South Dakota Legislature. Each district elects one senator and two representatives. The 26th and 28th districts are unusual, as they are the only ones do not elect both House members at-large. The 28th is subdivided into 2 sub-districts, 28A and 28B, which each elect their own representative to the House.

In the state senate, it has been represented by Republican Ryan Maher since 2017.

== 28A ==
State house district 28A

In the House, 28A has been represented by Democrat Oren Lesmeister since 2017. Republican Jana Hunt since 2025.

Located in northern South Dakota, the sub-district contains Corson, Dewey, Perkins, and Ziebach counties. Within it is the Standing Rock and Cheyenne River reservations.

== 28B ==
State house district 28B

In the House, 28B has been represented by Republican Neil Pinnow since 2023. Republican Travis Ismay since 2025.

Located in northwestern South Dakota, the sub-district contains Butte, Harding, and Perkins counties. Its largest city is Belle Fourche.
