= Wollmann =

Wollmann is a German surname. Notable people with the surname include:

- Cecilia Wollmann (born 1998), Bermudian competitive sailor
- Georg Wollmann (1861–after 1925), German trade union leader
- Helmut Wollmann (born 1947), German rower
- Herbert Wollmann (born 1951), German politician
- Mathew Wollmann, American politician
