= South Dakota Freedom Caucus =

US ultra-conservative political group

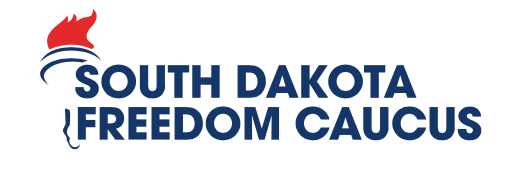
- Chair: Phil Jensen
- Vice Chair: John Carley; Aaron Aylward
- Founded: June 2022; 3 years ago
- Ideology: Limited government; Right-wing populism; Factions: Right-libertarianism
- Political position: Right-wing to far-right
- National affiliation: State Freedom Caucus Network
- Seats in the House Republican Conference: 9 / 65 (Note: Total representation may not be shown as some members are anonymous)
- Seats in the House: 9 / 70

Website
- South Dakota Freedom Caucus

The South Dakota Freedom Caucus is a legislative caucus of ultra-conservative Republican members in the South Dakota legislature that promotes steep spending and tax reductions, limited government power, and election reform. It is affiliated with the State Freedom Caucus Network, and modeled after the Freedom Caucus in the U.S. House of Representatives.

== History ==
The Caucus was created in June 2022 as part of the State Freedom Caucus Network's effort to establish caucuses in all state legislatures. The founding Chairman, Rep. Aaron Aylward, said he was inspired to run for office and form the Caucus by Sean Hannity and the urge to "do something" rather than be a "keyboard warrior."

== Political positions and involvement ==
=== Intra-party relationship ===
The Freedom Caucus is considered a more right-wing, populist group of Republicans compared to the members of the House and Senate Republican Caucuses. The leadership of the competing factions have sparred, with the former Republican Senate President Pro Tempore, Lee Schoenbeck, calling Freedom Caucus members "whack-a-doodles". Aylward accused traditional Republican legislators of failing to deliver on conservative campaign promises and adopting historically liberal ideals.

This dispute was reflected in the Republican primaries ahead of the 2024 elections, where moderate, traditional republicans characterized their challengers as far-right or "fringe", while Freedom Caucus members or supported candidates characterized their opponents as "fake republicans". The differences between these factions has been described as a "fight over the future of the party". Moderate Republicans have initiated reforms of party leadership and primary elections in an effort to stem the influence of those to their right, namely Freedom Caucus members.

The Freedom Caucus' current chairman, Rep. Phil Jensen, has had many public feuds with the House's Republican leadership and the House Republican Caucus. In the legislative sessions between 2024 and 2026, leadership has revoked his committee assignments for his comments related to school districts' bathroom policies for transgender students and the seating arrangements of a House education committee. In February 2026, he was suspended from the meetings of the House Republican Caucus after he claimed Democrats would oppose a non-binding Resolution encouraging people to "seek the Lord Most High for His healing presence and mercy.” Members of the House Republican Caucus said his comments were out of order for questioning the faith of other House members, while the Freedom Caucus accused the Republican leadership of "silenc[ing] people from speaking out on their beliefs and . . . matters of public importance."

=== Budget reform and spending ===
In 2026, the Caucus criticized the fiscal year 2027 budget for its expansion of the state government and increased spending, claiming it violates the values of the Republican Party.

=== Election reform ===
In the aftermath of the 2020 presidential election, Freedom Caucus members supported efforts to recount votes and overhaul the voting process. In August 2022, the Caucus requested that Governor Kristi Noem and Attorney General Mark Vargo "preserve" the 2020 election results for re-evaluation. Caucus member Rep. Julie Frye-Mueller introduced legislation to expand investigations into voter addresses and identities, but this was rejected by the House, including non-Freedom Caucus Republicans.

In 2024, the Caucus opposed a ballot initiative to create a “top-two” open primary system in the state.

In 2026, the legislature passed a law sponsored by the Freedom Caucus' Vice Chair, Sen. John Carley, that requires South Dakotans to provide documentary proof of their American citizenship in order to register to vote.

=== Abortion ===
Following the Supreme Court of the United States' decision in Dobbs v. Jackson (2022), the Freedom Caucus advocated for a special session to review and amend the state's abortion laws. The effort was rejected by the legislature's Republican leadership and Noem, who said the state's trigger law was sufficient to "save lives and help mothers impacted by the (Supreme Court’s) decision."

The Caucus opposes the use and availability of "abortion pills", and has criticized non-profits that advertise information on how to use and procure them as skirting around state law.

=== Criminal justice ===
During the 2025 special session, Caucus members opposed the creation of a $650 million men's prison, citing the adequacy of existing facilities and the need to address underlying mental health and rehabilitative issues. The Caucus also rejected a similar proposal during the prior regular session. Republican Caucus members, the Republicans not in the Freedom Caucus, argued in favor of the new facility due to the high cost of expanding and modernizing the existing prisons, and argued the Freedom Caucus was misleading voters on the cost of the proposal.

=== Environmental issues ===
In 2023, members of the Freedom Caucus rallied in favor of a law that would prohibit the use of eminent domain for climate capture pipeline projects. The Caucus' leader in the House called on Noem to convene a special session to resolve the issue.

=== Legislative process ===
In 2023, the Caucus accused Noem of acting beyond her office's constitutional authority by introducing bills in the legislature without the support of any member, undermining the state's separation of powers. Caucus member Rep. Tony Randolph introduced a bill that would require the Governor to have a legislative sponsor before introducing legislation.

In a scorecard published by the Voter Defense Association of South Dakota, Freedom Caucus members were ranked among the most against laws promoting ballot initiatives and other voter-led legislative efforts.

=== Transgender issues ===
In 2022, the Caucus celebrated Noem's cancellation of the state's contract with a transgender advocacy group, stating it planned on introducing a bill to ban transgender procedures and medications for minors.

== Controversy ==
=== Frye-Mueller suspension and censure ===
In January 2023, Frye-Mueller was accused of berating a Legislative Research Council employee about her decision to vaccinate her child. She was later suspended pending an investigation into the incident by a Senate Select Committee on Discipline and Expulsion. The Caucus criticized the suspension, citing the Committee's lack of a reasoned justification. She was officially censured for her behavior, which was labelled workplace harassment. Frye-Mueller claimed she was being punished for “advancing freedom”.

== Members ==
=== Current members ===
- Rep. Phil Jensen – Chairman
- Sen. John Carley – Vice Chairman
- Rep. Tina Mulally – Secretary and Treasurer
- Rep. Aaron Aylward – House Freedom Caucus leader; former Chairman
- Rep. Heather Baxter
- Rep. Josephine Garcia
- Rep. Julie Frye-Mueller
- Rep. Dylan Jordan
- Rep. Tony Kayser
- Rep. Logan Manhart
- Rep. Tony Randolph – former Vice Chairman
