= Elmer A. Bietz =

American politician (1934–2026)

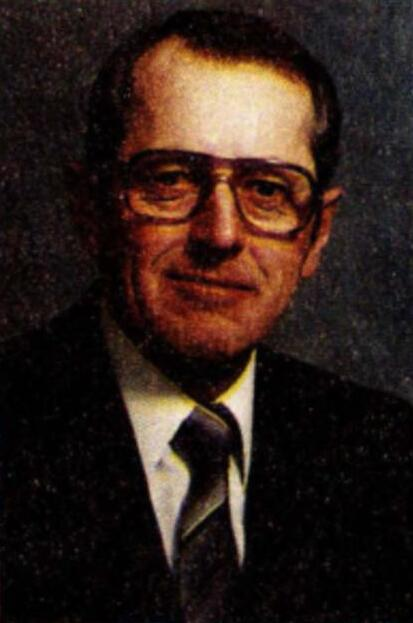

Member of the South Dakota Senate
- In office 1983–1992

Personal details
- Born: May 4, 1934 Tripp, South Dakota, U.S.
- Died: October 7, 2026 (aged 92)
- Party: Republican
- Relatives: G. C. Freitag (grandfather)

Elmer A. Bietz (May 4, 1934 – October 7, 2026) was an American politician. He served as a Republican member of the South Dakota Senate.

== Life and career ==
Bietz was born in Tripp, South Dakota, on May 4, 1934. He served in the United States Navy.

He served in the South Dakota Senate from 1983 to 1992.

Bietz died on October 7, 2026, at the age of 92.
