= South Dakota's 23rd legislative district =

American legislative district

South Dakota's 23rd State Senate district

South Dakota's 23rd legislative district is one of 35 districts in the South Dakota Legislature. Each district is represented by 1 senator and 2 representatives. In the Senate, it has been represented by Republican Bryan Breitling since 2021. In the House, it has been represented by Republicans James D. Wangsness and Scott Moore since 2023.

== Geography ==
The district contains Brown, Campbell, Edmunds, Faulk, Hand, McPherson, Potter, and Walworth counties in northern South Dakota. Its largest city is Miller.
