= G. C. Freitag =

Russian-American politician

Member of the South Dakota House of Representatives
- In office 1929–1932
- In office 1939–1940

Personal details
- Born: Gustave Carl Freitag; May 24, 1878 Tauragė, Russian Empire
- Died: May 26, 1946 (aged 68) Bon Homme County, South Dakota, USA
- Party: Republican
- Relatives: Elmer A. Bietz (grandson)

Gustave Carl Freitag (May 24, 1878 – May 26, 1946) was a German-American politician. He served as a Republican member of the South Dakota House of Representatives.

Freitag was born to German parents in Tauragė, Lithuania (then the Russian Empire).
