= Spencer Gosch =

American politician

Speaker of the South Dakota House of Representatives
- In office January 8, 2021 – January 10, 2023
- Preceded by: Steven Haugaard
- Succeeded by: Hugh Bartels

Speaker pro tempore of the South Dakota House of Representatives
- In office January 8, 2019 – January 8, 2021
- Preceded by: Steven Haugaard
- Succeeded by: Jon Hansen

Member of the South Dakota House of Representatives from the 23rd district
- In office January 10, 2017 – January 10, 2023 Serving with Charles Hoffman (2021–23); John Lake (2017–21)
- Preceded by: Justin Cronin; Michele Harrison
- Succeeded by: Scott Moore; James Wangsness

Personal details
- Born: January 22, 1984 (age 42) Mobridge, South Dakota, U.S.
- Party: Republican
- Education: University of South Dakota (BS)
- Profession: Farmer, insurance agent

Spencer Gosch (born January 22, 1984) is an American politician who served in the South Dakota House of Representatives. He served as the Speaker of the House during the 96th and 97th Legislative Sessions. Prior to that, he served as Speaker pro tempore during the 94th and 95th Legislative Sessions.

Gosch opted to run for a seat in the South Dakota Senate in 2022 rather than seeking re-election to the House. He lost the Republican primary election to incumbent Bryan Breitling. Spencer was reelected to his former house seat in 2024 after defeating incumbent James D. Wangness.

== Election history ==
=== 2022 ===
State Senator, District 23, Primary Election
Party	Candidate	Votes	%
Republican	Bryan J. Breitling	3,019	54.2
Republican	Spencer Gosch	2,552	45.8
Total votes		5,571	100

=== 2020 ===
State Representative, District 23, General Election
Party	Candidate	Votes	%
Republican	Spencer Gosch	8,325	55.1
Republican	Charles Hoffman	6,791	44.9
Total votes		15,116	100
Republican hold			

State Representative, District 23, Primary Election
Party	Candidate	Votes	%
Republican	Spencer Gosch	3,107	40.7
Republican	Charles Hoffman	2,709	35.4
Republican	James D. Wangsness	1,072	14.0
Republican	Kevin E. Watts	755	9.9
Total votes		7,643	100

=== 2018 ===
State Representative, District 23, General Election
Party	Candidate	Votes	%
Republican	Spencer Gosch	7,115	41.0
Republican	John Lake	6,435	37.0
Democratic	Eleanor Iverson	2,105	12.1
Democratic	Margaret Ann Walsh	1,717	9.9
Total votes		17,372	100
Republican hold			

=== 2016 ===
State Representative, District 23, General Election
Party	Candidate	Votes	%
Republican	Spencer Gosch	7,099	53.8
Republican	John Lake	6,094	46.2
Total votes		13,193	100
Republican hold			

State Representative, District 23, Primary Election
Party	Candidate	Votes	%
Republican	John Lake	2,466	31.2
Republican	Spencer Gosch	2,135	27.0
Republican	Charles Hoffman	1,706	21.6
Republican	Dick Werner	1,607	20.3
Total votes		7,914	100

South Dakota House of Representatives
Preceded by Steven Haugaard	Speaker pro tempore of the South Dakota House of Representatives; 2019–2021	Succeeded by Jon Hansen
Political offices
Preceded by Steven Haugaard	Speaker of the South Dakota House of Representatives; 2021–2023	Succeeded by Hugh Bartels
