= Jana Hunt =

American politician

Member of the South Dakota House of Representatives from the 28 A district
- Incumbent
- Assumed office January 14, 2025
- Preceded by: Oren Lesmeister

Personal details
- Born: July 30, 1997 (age 28) Dupree, South Dakota
- Party: Republican
- Website: www.terrijorgenson.com

Jana Hunt (born July 30, 1997) is an American politician. She serves as a Republican member for the 28 A in the South Dakota House of Representatives since 2025. The district includes the cities of Timber Lake and McIntosh, as well as portions of the Cheyenne River and Standing Rock reservations.
