= O. L. Anderson =

American politician (1930–2022)

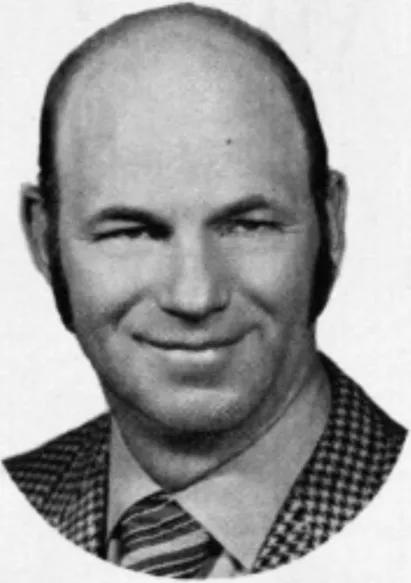
- Anderson in 1971

Member of the South Dakota House of Representatives
- In office 1971–1980

Personal details
- Born: September 28, 1930
- Died: October 25, 2022 (aged 92)
- Party: Republican
- Spouse(s): Jone Sager Marilyn Pruitt (m. 1993)
- Children: 3; including David Anderson
- Education: St. Olaf College

O. L. Anderson (September 28, 1930 – October 25, 2022) was an American politician. He served as a Republican member of the South Dakota House of Representatives.

== Life and career ==
Anderson attended Beresford High School and St. Olaf College. He served in the United States Army during the Korean War.

Anderson served in the South Dakota House of Representatives from 1971 to 1980.

Anderson died in October 2022, at the age of 92.
