= Kelly Sullivan (politician) =

American politician

Member of the South Dakota House of Representatives from the 13th district
- In office January 2019 – January 2021
- Preceded by: Mark Mickelson
- Succeeded by: Richard Thomason

Personal details
- Party: Democratic

Kelly Sullivan is an American politician. She was a Democrat representing the 13th district in the South Dakota House of Representatives.

== Political career ==
In 2018, Sullivan ran for election to one of two District 13 seats in the South Dakota House of Representatives. She faced two Republicans, incumbent Sue Peterson and Rex Rolfing, in the general election, and Peterson and Sullivan won. She is running for reelection in 2020.

As of July 2020, Sullivan sat on the following committees:

- Commerce and Energy
- Local Government

=== Electoral record ===
2018 general election: South Dakota House of Representatives, District 13
Party	Candidate	Votes	%
Republican	Sue Peterson	6,376	37.0%
Democratic	Kelly Sullivan	5,476	31.7%
Republican	Rex Rolfing	5,396	31.3%

South Dakota House of Representatives District 13 General election
Party	Candidate	Votes	%
Republican	Sue Peterson (incumbent)	6,746	28.22%
Republican	Richard Thomason	6,215	26.00%
Democratic	Kelly Sullivan (incumbent)	5,846	24.46%
Democratic	Norman B. Bliss	5,094	21.31%
Total votes		23,901	100.0%
Republican hold			
Republican gain from Democratic			
