= Brian Dreyer =

American politician

Member of the South Dakota House of Representatives from the 32nd district
- In office January 9, 2007 – November 2, 2009
- Preceded by: Tom Hennies
- Succeeded by: Kristin Conzet

Personal details
- Born: January 5, 1976 (age 50) Chadron, Nebraska
- Party: Republican

Brian Dreyer (born January 5, 1976) is an American politician who served in the South Dakota House of Representatives from the 32nd district from 2007 to 2009.
