= Chris P. Johnson =

American politician

Member of the South Dakota House of Representatives from the 32nd district
- In office January 8, 2019 – January 10, 2023
- Preceded by: Kristin Conzet
- Succeeded by: Steve Duffy

Personal details
- Party: Republican

Chris P. Johnson is a South Dakota politician who served in the South Dakota House of Representatives from 2019 to 2023. Johnson was elected as the South Dakota House of Representatives Assistant Majority Leader for the 2021-2022 session.

== Election history ==
2020 South Dakota House of Representatives District 32 General election
Party	Candidate	Votes	%
Republican	Chris P. Johnson (incumbent)	6,391	32.38%
Republican	Becky Drury	5,587	28.31%
Democratic	James Preston	3,932	19.92%
Democratic	Toni Diamond	3,826	19.39%
Total votes		19,736	100.0%
Republican hold			
Republican hold			
