= Travis Ismay =

American politician

Member of the South Dakota House of Representatives from the 28 B district
- Incumbent
- Assumed office January 14, 2025
- Preceded by: Neil Pinnow

Personal details
- Party: Republican
- Website: www.travisforsouthdakota.com

Travis Ismay is an American politician. He serves as a Republican member for the 28 B in the South Dakota House of Representatives since 2025. He is a welder and Republican activist in Butte County, South Dakota.
