= Josephine Garcia =

American politician

Member of the South Dakota House of Representatives from the 5th district
- Incumbent
- Assumed office January 14, 2025 Serving with Matt Roby

Personal details
- Born: May 29, 1967 (age 59)
- Party: Republican

Josephine Garcia (born May 29, 1967) is an American politician. She serves as a Republican member for the 5th district in the South Dakota House of Representatives since 2025. The district is located in Codington County and is made up of the city of Watertown. She is the owner of Garcia Family Clinic. In the state legislature, she is a member of the South Dakota Freedom Caucus.
