= Stephanie Sauder =

American politician

Member of the South Dakota Senate from the 4th district
- Incumbent
- Assumed office January 14, 2025
- Preceded by: John Wiik

Member of the South Dakota House of Representatives from the 4th district
- In office January 10, 2023 – January 14, 2025 Serving with Fred Deutsch
- Preceded by: John Mills

Personal details
- Born: November 17, 1958 (age 67)
- Party: Republican
- Education: Dakota State University; Northern State University

Stephanie Sauder (born November 17, 1958) is an American politician in the South Dakota Senate. She also served in the South Dakota House of Representatives. First elected in 2022, she has represented South Dakota's 4th legislative district as a Republican since 2023. Before serving as representative, she was elected mayor of Bryant, South Dakota. Sauder was a teacher at Hamlin School for over 30 years, during that time her family maintained an active agricultural operation. On November 5, 2024, she was elected as the state senator for District 4.

== Education ==
Sauder graduated from Dakota State University in 1990 with a bachelor's degree in education. She also graduated from Northern State University in 2012 with a master's degree in educational leadership and administration.

== Background ==
Sauder previously served for eight years as the mayor of Bryant, South Dakota. Sauder is a retired teacher, having worked in the Hamlin School District for over 30 years. After retiring from education, Sauder purchased the Bryant Dakotan Newspaper becoming editor. Sauder is the daughter of former state senator Milt Lakness and former Hamlin County commissioner Benita Lakness. Her husband Jerry maintains an active agricultural operation in South Dakota. Both of Sauder's sons serve in law enforcement in South Dakota. During her teenage years, Sauder worked as a babysitter for future South Dakota Governor Kristi Noem.

Sauder's community involvement includes serving on the ITC Board of Directors, Bryant Cinema Board of Director, New Hope Lutheran Church organist, Bryan American Legion Auxiliary member, Parkview Assisted Living Auxiliary member, Mothers of Peace Officers member, South Dakota Federation of Republican Women member, Codington County Republican women member, and National Rifle Association member.

Sauder is the State Committeewomen of the Hamlin County Republican Party.

== State Committee Memberships ==
=== 2023–2024 ===
- House Agriculture and Natural Resources Committee
- House Education Committee
- House Military and Veterans Affairs Committee
- One Hundredth Session Planning Committee
- House Military and Veterans' Affairs Committee

=== 2025–2026 ===
- Senate Education Committee
- Senate Transportation Committee

== Electoral history ==
South Dakota Senate District 4 General Election, 2024
| Party | Candidate | Votes | % |
|---|---|---|---|
| Republican | Stephanie Sauder | 10,375 | 100.0 |

South Dakota Senate District 4 Primary Election, 2024
| Party | Candidate | Votes | % |
|---|---|---|---|
| Republican | Stephanie Sauder | 1,868 | 50.9 |
| Republican | Fred Deutsch | 1,804 | 49.1 |

South Dakota House of Representatives District 4 General Election, 2022
| Party | Candidate | Votes | % |
|---|---|---|---|
| Republican | Fred Deutsch | 6,977 | 52.5 |
| Republican | Stephanie Sauder | 6,300 | 47.5 |

South Dakota House of Representatives District 4 Primary Election, 2022
| Party | Candidate | Votes | % |
|---|---|---|---|
| Republican | Stephanie Sauder | 2,229 | 31.3 |
| Republican | Fred Deutsch | 2,170 | 30.4 |
| Republican | Valentine Rausch | 1,677 | 23.5 |
| Republican | Adam Grimm | 1,056 | 14.8 |
