= Julie Auch =

American politician

Member of the South Dakota House of Representatives from the 18th district
- Incumbent
- Assumed office January 10, 2023 Serving with Mike Stevens

Personal details
- Born: January 8, 1968 (age 58)
- Party: Republican
- Education: Mount Marty University

Julie K. Auch (born January 8, 1969) is an American politician. She has served as a member of the South Dakota House of Representatives from the 18th district since 2023, alongside Mike Stevens. She is a member of the Republican Party.
