= Mathew Wollmann =

American politician

Member of the South Dakota House of Representatives from the 8th district
- In office January 13, 2015 – January 23, 2017
- Preceded by: Scott Parsley
- Succeeded by: Marli Wiese

Personal details
- Born: November 28, 1990 (age 35)
- Party: Republican

Mathew Wollmann (born November 28, 1990) is an American politician who served in the South Dakota House of Representatives from the 8th district from 2015 to 2017.

He resigned on January 23, 2017, after admitting to having sex with two House interns.
