= Southeast Technical College =

Community college in Sioux Falls, South Dakota, U.S.

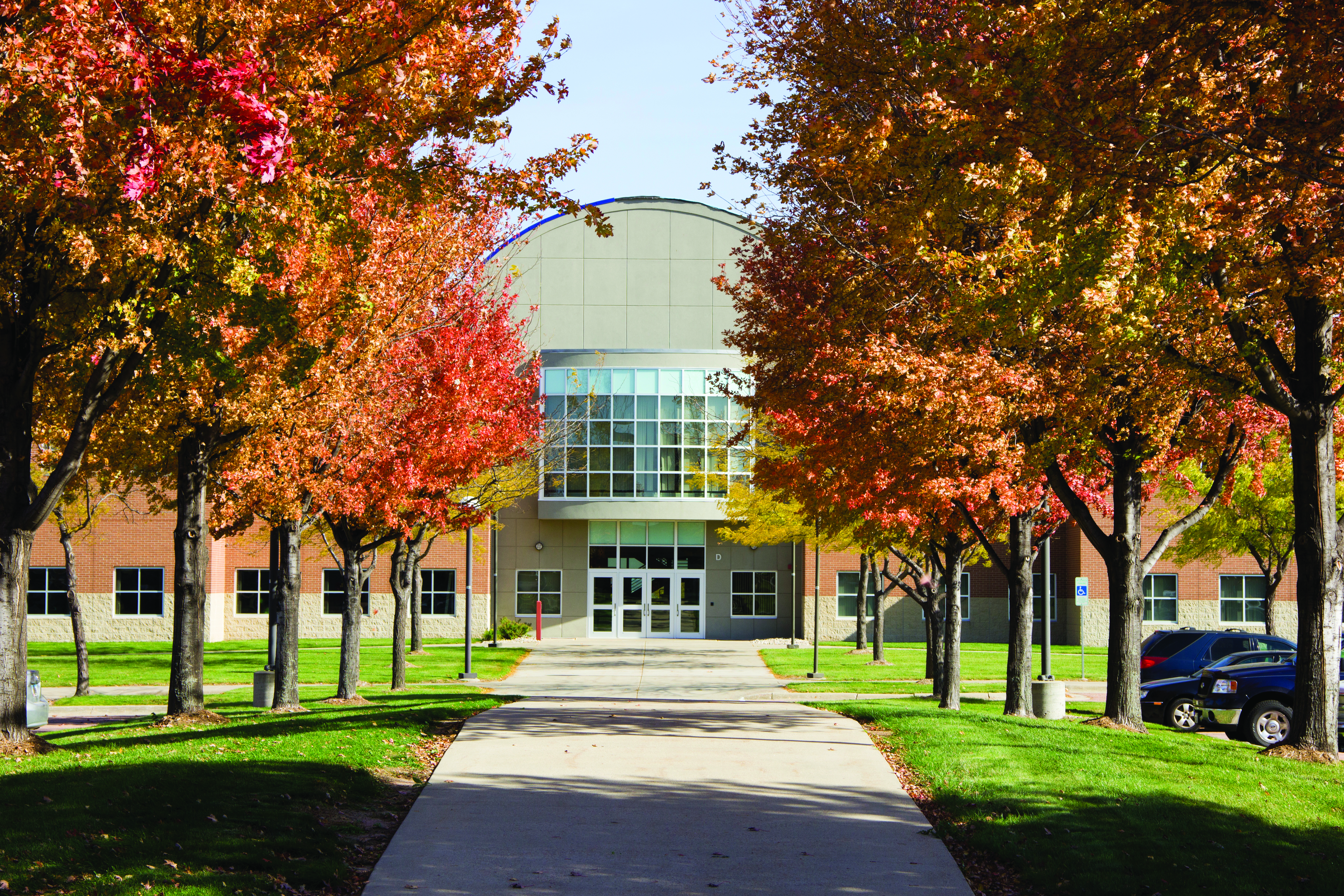
- Tech Center in 2017
- Type: Public community college
- Established: 1968
- Accreditation: HLC
- President: Cory Clasemann
- Location: 2320 North Career Avenue, Sioux Falls, South Dakota, 57107, United States; 43°34′06.0″N 96°46′52.7″W
- Campus: 168 acres (68 ha); Urban
- Website: www.southeasttech.edu

- Location within South Dakota Location within the United States

Southeast Technical College (STC), sometimes called Southeast Tech, is a two-year technical community college in Sioux Falls, South Dakota, United States. Southeast Area Vocational Technical School was founded in 1968 and first operated out of various buildings across Sioux Falls. In 1989, it moved onto its current campus and changed its name to Southeast Vocational Technical Institute. It shortened its name to Southeast Technical Institute in 1993, before adopting its current name following a statewide restructure of the technical college system in 2020. It offers associate degrees and certificates in programs related to business, technology, healthcare, trades, and other sectors. The institution is accredited by the Higher Learning Commission (HLC).

== History ==
Southeast Area Vocational Technical School was founded in 1968 with 118 students and programs in nursing, data processing, appliance repair, drafting, industrial electronics, and diesel and airplane mechanics. In 1970, the school moved into a building at the intersection of West 15th Street and Western Avenue named The Career Center; this building was renamed the West Campus in 1975. A second building, called the East Campus, at the corner of 9th Avenue and 14th Street was purchased in 1973 and hosted automobile, printing, horticulture, and advertising programs. In 1981, Beadle Elementary School began hosting additional programs.

By 1987, 500 students were enrolled. The following year, the Sioux Falls City Council approved 56 acres (23 ha) to be converted into a dedicated campus. Now renamed Southeast Vocational Technical Institute, the school moved onto its current campus in 1989. The first building constructed was the George S. Mickelson Center, completed at a cost of $3.5 million. Other buildings constructed include the Scarborough Childcare Center in 1991, the Terrence Sullivan Health Science Center in 1994, and the Southeast Technical Center in 2001. To accommodate the expansions, the campus purchased an additional 112 acres (45 ha) in 1998. Two residence halls, Hummel-Nicolay Hall and Andera Hall, were added in 2003 and 2005, respectively, and could house 100 students each. Several existing campus buildings were expanded between 2010 and 2020.

In 1993, the institute changed its name to Southeast Technical Institute. On July 1, 2020, all technical institutes in South Dakota, including Southeast Tech, were renamed to replace "institute" with "college".

A new building, the Healthcare Simulation Center, opened in April 2024 and simulates a hospital setting. The 33,000 square feet (3,100 m^{2}) building cost $10 million to construct; $5.5 million was accumulated from private donations and the remaining $4.5 million was appropriated by the South Dakota Legislature.

== Campus ==
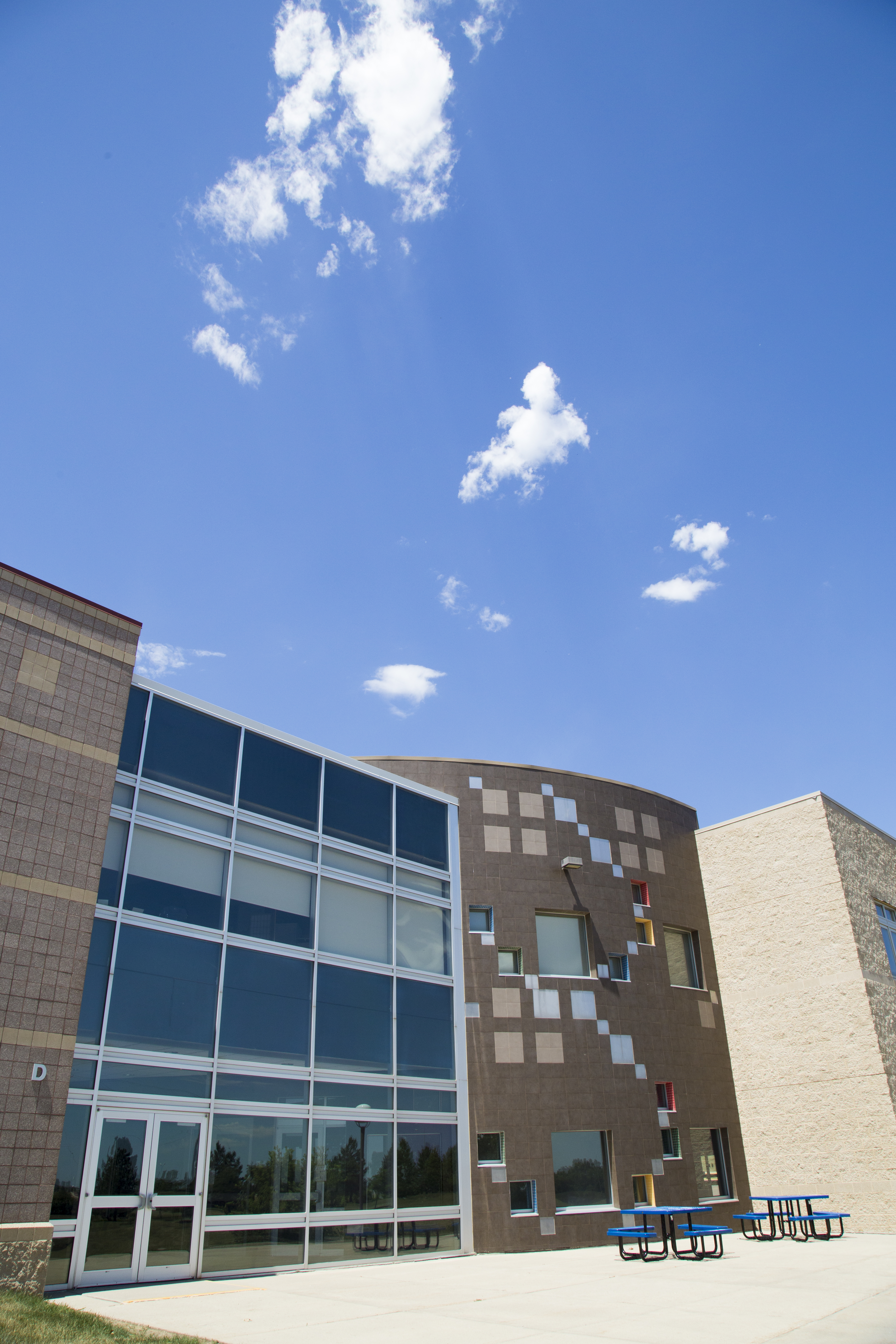
Terrence Sullivan Health-Science Center

Southeast Tech is situated on a 168-acre (68 ha) campus located at 2320 North Career Avenue in Sioux Falls, South Dakota. It includes several academic buildings, two residence halls, and a childcare building. Buildings include:

- George S. Mickelson Center, location of admissions and financial aid offices
- The HUB contains lounges, classrooms, two laboratories, student dining, an auditorium, and offices
- Ed Wood Trade & Industry Center, home of industrial technology and transportation departments
- Terrence Sullivan Health Science Center, home of healthcare and law enforcement departments
- Healthcare Simulation Center, a simulated hospital building for healthcare programs
- Southeast Technology Center, home of the information technology department
- Andera Hall and Hummel-Nicolay Hall, two residence buildings, each containing 54 units
- Scarborough Childcare Center, offering childcare services for students and staff

== Administration ==
Southeast Tech is managed by the Sioux Falls School Board.

In March 2024, President Robert Griggs resigned after eight years as the college's president, to be replaced by Cory Clasemann in mid-July 2024.

== Academics ==
Southeast Tech offers degree programs, certificates, and non-degree courses in a variety of sectors, including agriculture, business, technology, horticulture, information and computer technology, construction, engineering, healthcare (including veterinary medicine), industrial trades, law enforcement, childcare, media, and automotive sciences. It also offers GED, adult learning, and ESL programs through its Hovland Learning Center.

=== Partnerships ===
Southeast Tech has partnerships with Huron Regional Medical Center and Huron Community Campus and offers nursing programs in Huron, South Dakota. In April 2024, Southeast Tech signed two articulation agreements to allow its graduates to pursue bachelor's degrees at other South Dakota institutions: one with South Dakota School of Mines and Technology (SDSM&T) for civil engineering graduates, and another with Dakota Wesleyan University for licensed practical nursing graduates.

=== Accreditation ===
Southeast Tech has been accredited through the Higher Learning Commission (HLC) since 1981 and were part of its Academic Quality Improvement Program until that program was discontinued in 2018; Southeast Tech is now part of the HLC's Open Pathway program. Individual academic programs are also accredited by various organizations and boards.
