= South Dakota's 19th legislative district =

American legislative district

South Dakota's 19th State Senate district

South Dakota's 19th legislative district is one of 35 districts in the South Dakota Legislature. Each district is represented by 1 senator and 2 representatives. In the Senate, it has been represented by Republican Kyle Schoenfish since 2020. In the House, it has been represented by Republicans Jessica Bahmuller and Drew Peterson since 2023.

== Geography ==
The district is located within Bon Homme, Hanson, Hutchinson, McCook, and Turner County in rural southeastern South Dakota. Its largest city is Parkston.
