= Tripp, South Dakota =

- City
- Motto: "Easy to Find, Hard to Leave"
- Location in Hutchinson County and the state of South Dakota
- Coordinates: 43°13′31″N 97°57′57″W
- Country: United States
- State: South Dakota
- County: Hutchinson
- Incorporated: 1910

Area
  - Total: 0.59 sq mi (1.54 km^{2})
  - Land: 0.59 sq mi (1.54 km^{2})
  - Water: 0 sq mi (0.00 km^{2})
- Elevation: 1,562 ft (476 m)

Population (2020)
  - Total: 575
  - Density: 969.4/sq mi (374.29/km^{2})
- Time zone: UTC-6 (Central (CST))
  - Summer (DST): UTC-5 (CDT)
- ZIP code: 57376
- Area code: 605
- FIPS code: 46-64020
- GNIS feature ID: 1267604
- Website: Tripp, South Dakota

Tripp is a city in Hutchinson County, South Dakota, United States. The population was 575 in the 2020 census.

== History ==
Tripp was laid out in 1886, and named in honor of Bartlett Tripp, chief justice of the Dakota Territory Supreme Court. Tripp was incorporated in 1910.

In 2018 Tripp's nursing home closed.

== Geography ==
According to the United States Census Bureau, the city has a total area of 0.59 square miles (1.53 km^{2}), all land.

== Demographics ==
Historical population
Census	Pop.	Note	%±
1890	226		—
1900	366		61.9%
1910	675		84.4%
1920	970		43.7%
1930	939		−3.2%
1940	913		−2.8%
1950	913		0.0%
1960	837		−8.3%
1970	851		1.7%
1980	804		−5.5%
1990	664		−17.4%
2000	711		7.1%
2010	647		−9.0%
2020	575		−11.1%
U.S. Decennial Census

=== 2020 census ===
As of the 2020 census, Tripp had a population of 575. The median age was 48.2 years. 21.2% of residents were under the age of 18 and 26.1% of residents were 65 years of age or older. For every 100 females there were 109.1 males, and for every 100 females age 18 and over there were 107.8 males age 18 and over.

0.0% of residents lived in urban areas, while 100.0% lived in rural areas.

There were 272 households in Tripp, of which 21.0% had children under the age of 18 living in them. Of all households, 43.8% were married-couple households, 26.8% were households with a male householder and no spouse or partner present, and 23.9% were households with a female householder and no spouse or partner present. About 40.8% of all households were made up of individuals and 20.6% had someone living alone who was 65 years of age or older.

There were 332 housing units, of which 18.1% were vacant. The homeowner vacancy rate was 1.3% and the rental vacancy rate was 26.9%.

Racial composition as of the 2020 census
Race	Number	Percent
White	519	90.3%
Black or African American	1	0.2%
American Indian and Alaska Native	12	2.1%
Asian	4	0.7%
Native Hawaiian and Other Pacific Islander	0	0.0%
Some other race	4	0.7%
Two or more races	35	6.1%
Hispanic or Latino (of any race)	17	3.0%

=== 2010 census ===
As of the census of 2010, there were 647 people, 290 households, and 167 families residing in the city. The population density was 1,096.6 inhabitants per square mile (423.4/km^{2}). There were 360 housing units at an average density of 610.2 per square mile (235.6/km^{2}). The racial makeup of the city was 98.5% White, 0.6% Native American, 0.2% Asian, 0.2% from other races, and 0.6% from two or more races. Hispanic or Latino of any race were 1.7% of the population.

There were 290 households, of which 19.7% had children under the age of 18 living with them, 46.2% were married couples living together, 5.5% had a female householder with no husband present, 5.9% had a male householder with no wife present, and 42.4% were non-families. 38.6% of all households were made up of individuals, and 26.2% had someone living alone who was 65 years of age or older. The average household size was 2.06 and the average family size was 2.64.

The median age in the city was 55.2 years. 16.5% of residents were under the age of 18; 3.3% were between the ages of 18 and 24; 18.3% were from 25 to 44; 24.8% were from 45 to 64; and 37.2% were 65 years of age or older. The gender makeup of the city was 48.1% male and 51.9% female.

=== 2000 census ===
As of the census of 2000, 711 people, 321 households, and 183 families reside in the city. The population density was 1,225.8 inhabitants per square mile (473.3/km^{2}). There were 373 housing units at an average density of 643.1 per square mile (248.3/km^{2}). The racial makeup of the city was 98.73% White, 0.42% Native American, 0.28% Asian, and 0.56% from two or more races. Hispanic or Latino of any race were 1.41% of the population.

There were 321 households, out of which 21.2% had children under the age of 18 living with them, 48.9% were married couples living together, 6.2% had a female householder with no husband present, and 42.7% were non-families. 39.3% of all households were made up of individuals, and 24.3% had someone living alone who was 65 years of age or older. The average household size was 2.02 and the average family size was 2.68.

In the city, the population was spread out, with 17.4% under the age of 18, 3.9% from 18 to 24, 19.4% from 25 to 44, 20.1% from 45 to 64, and 39.1% who were 65 years of age or older. The median age was 54 years. For every 100 females, there were 78.6 males. For every 100 females age 18 and over, there were 76.8 males.

The median income for a household in the city was $24,609, and the median income for a family was $34,531. Males had a median income of $26,500 versus $16,397 for females. The per capita income for the city was $16,231. About 13.7% of families and 18.6% of the population were below the poverty line, including 28.6% of those under age 18 and 14.3% of those age 65 or over.

== Notable people ==
- Caleb Finck, member of the South Dakota House of Representatives
- Jared Reiner, retired NBA player
