= Scott Odenbach =

American politician

Majority Leader of the South Dakota House of Representatives
- Incumbent
- Assumed office January 14, 2025
- Preceded by: Will Mortenson

Member of the South Dakota House of Representatives from the 31st district
- Incumbent
- Assumed office January 12, 2021 Serving with Mary Fitzgerald
- Preceded by: Timothy Johns; Dayle Hammock

Personal details
- Born: August 16, 1972 (age 53)
- Party: Republican
- Education: South Dakota State University (BS); University of South Dakota (JD)

Scott Odenbach is an American politician and attorney serving as a member of the South Dakota House of Representatives from the 31st district.

== Career ==
Odenbach served as assistant general counsel for the Florida Department of Education. He is the owner and managing broker at Liberty Tree Properties realty and manages his own law firm. He served as a member of the Spearfish School Board from 2017 to 2020.

== Election history ==
- 2020: Odenbach was elected to the South Dakota House of Representatives with 8,104 votes along with Mary Fitzgerald, who received 6,920 votes and they defeated Brooke Abdallah who received 4,590 votes.

2020 South Dakota House of Representatives District 31 General election
Party	Candidate	Votes	%
Republican	Scott Odenbach	8,104	41.32%
Republican	Mary Fitzgerald	6,920	35.28%
Democratic	Brooke Abdallah	4,590	23.40%
Total votes		19,614	100.0%
Republican hold			
Republican hold			

South Dakota House of Representatives
Preceded by Will Mortenson	Majority Leader of the South Dakota House of Representatives; 2025–present	Incumbent
