= Lana Greenfield =

American politician

Member of the South Dakota House of Representatives from the 2nd district
- In office 2015–2023 Serving with Kaleb Weis (2019- present)
- Preceded by: Brock Greenfield

Personal details
- Born: January 30, 1951 (age 75) Watertown, South Dakota, U.S.
- Party: Republican
- Spouse: Don
- Children: 3, including Brock Greenfield
- Profession: Teacher, business owner

Lana Greenfield (born January 30, 1951) is an American politician. She served as a Republican member for the 2nd district in the South Dakota House of Representatives from 2015 to 2023.

Greenfield ran as a Republican in the 22nd district in the South Dakota House of Representatives in 2024 and was elected.

== Election history ==
- 2020 Greenfield was re-elected by receiving 6,428 votes along with Kaleb Weis who received 6,381 votes.
- 2018 Greenfield was re-elected by receiving 5,673 along with Kaleb Weis who received 4,821 votes, they defeated Democratic candidates Jenae Hansen who received 3,856 votes and Mike McHugh who received 3,060 votes.
- 2016 Greenfield was re-elected by receiving 6,225 votes along with Burt Tulson who received 6,220 votes, they defeated Democratic candidate John Graham who received 3,673 votes.
