= Kent Peterson (politician) =

American politician

Majority Leader of the South Dakota House of Representatives
- In office January 12, 2021 – January 10, 2023
- Preceded by: Lee Qualm
- Succeeded by: Will Mortenson

Member of the South Dakota House of Representatives from the 19th district
- In office January 13, 2015 – January 10, 2023 Serving with Marty Overweg
- Preceded by: Stace Nelson
- Succeeded by: Jessica Bahmuller; Drew Peterson

Personal details
- Party: Republican
- Education: University of South Dakota

Kent Peterson is an American politician and a Republican former member of the South Dakota House of Representatives representing District 19 since 2015. Peterson served as the majority leader from 2021 to 2023. He was a member of the joint legislative procedure, judiciary, legislative procedure, and state affairs committees.

South Dakota House of Representatives
Preceded by Lee Qualm	Majority Leader of the South Dakota House of Representatives; 2021–2023	Succeeded by Will Mortenson
