= Jessica Bahmuller =

American politician

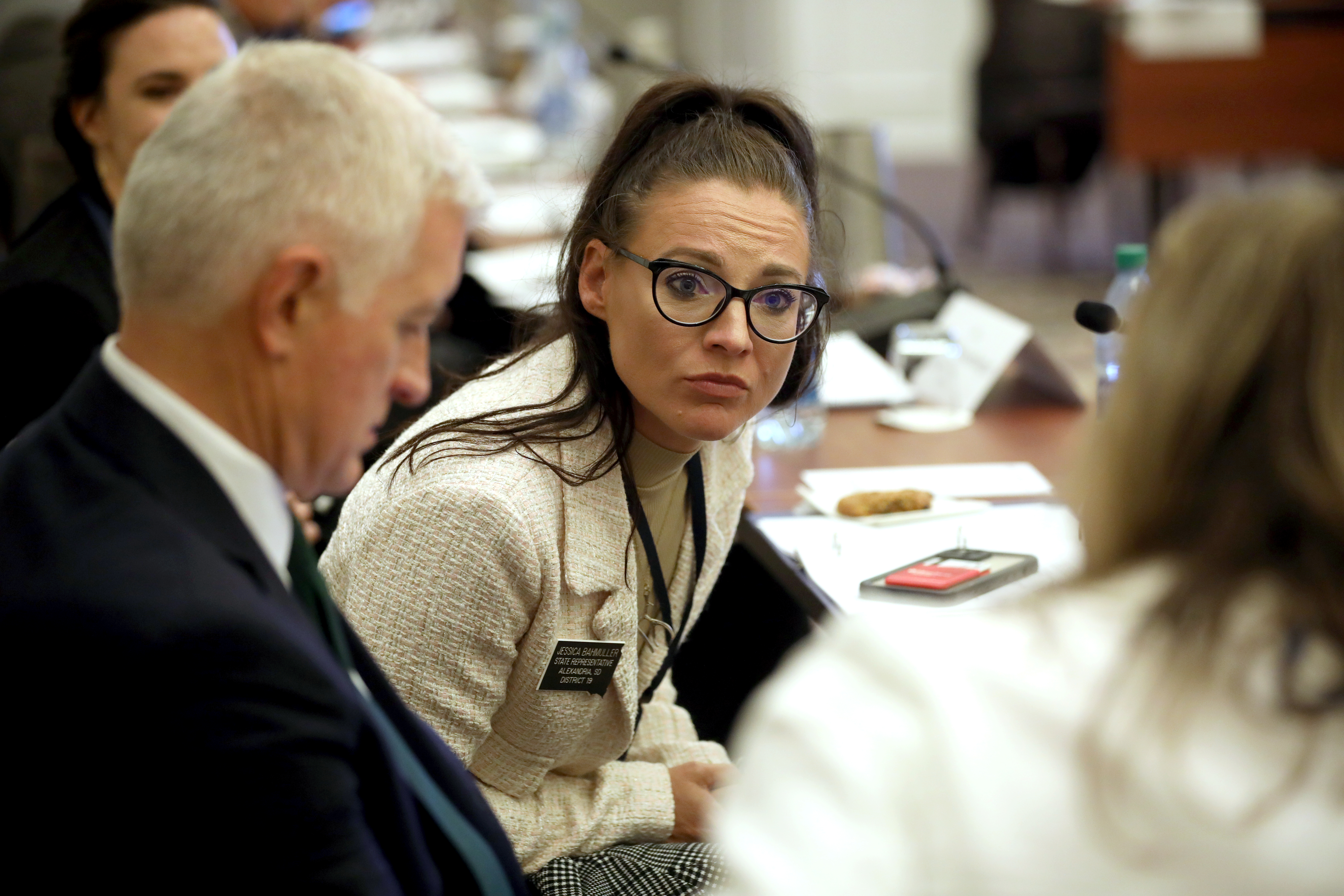

Member of the South Dakota House of Representatives from the 19th district
- Incumbent
- Assumed office January 10, 2023 Serving with Drew Peterson
- Preceded by: Marty Overweg; Kent Peterson

Personal details
- Born: February 10, 1983 (age 43)
- Party: Republican

Jessica Bahmuller (born February 10, 1983) is an American politician. She has served as a member of the South Dakota House of Representatives from the 19th district since 2023, alongside Drew Peterson. She is a member of the Republican Party.
