= Mike Weisgram =

American politician

Member of the South Dakota House of Representatives from the 24th district
- Incumbent
- Assumed office January 12, 2021 Serving with Will Mortenson
- Preceded by: Tim Rounds; Mary Duvall

Personal details
- Born: March 27, 1953 (age 73)
- Party: Republican

Mike Weisgram (born March 27, 1953) is a business owner and a Republican member of the South Dakota House of Representatives who has been representing District 24 since January 12, 2021.

== Election history ==
- 2020 Weisgram was elected with 7,786 votes; Will Mortenson was also elected with 8,410 votes and Amanda Bachmann received 3,079 votes.

2020 South Dakota House of Representatives District 24 General election
Party	Candidate	Votes	%
Republican	Will Mortenson	8,410	43.63%
Republican	Mike Weisgram	7,786	40.39%
Democratic	Amanda Bachmann	3,079	15.97%
Total votes		19,275	100.0%
Republican hold			
Republican hold			
