= Jon Hansen =

American attorney and legislator

Speaker of the South Dakota House of Representatives
- Incumbent
- Assumed office January 14, 2025
- Preceded by: Hugh Bartels

Speaker pro tempore of the South Dakota House of Representatives
- In office January 8, 2021 – January 10, 2023
- Preceded by: Spencer Gosch
- Succeeded by: Mike Stevens

Member of the South Dakota House of Representatives from the 25th district
- Incumbent
- Assumed office January 2019
- In office January 2011 – January 2013

Personal details
- Born: December 30, 1985 (age 40) Yankton, South Dakota, U.S.
- Party: Republican
- Spouse: Sheila
- Children: 6
- Education: Southeast Technical College (AA); University of Sioux Falls (BBA); University of South Dakota (JD)
- Website: Campaign website

Jon Hansen (born December 30, 1985) is an American politician currently serving as a representative for the 25th Legislative District in the South Dakota House of Representatives and as Speaker of the South Dakota House of Representatives. A member of the Republican Party, he formerly served as the Speaker pro tempore of the South Dakota House of Representatives.

Hansen previously served as a Representative for District 25 in 2011–2013. Hansen currently serves as Speaker of the House, and is the former chairman of the House Judiciary Committee from 2019-2024. He previously served as a House Majority Whip from 2019-2020.

Hansen ran for Governor of South Dakota with fellow state representative Karla Lems as his running mate in the 2026 South Dakota gubernatorial election. He finished fourth in the Republican primary.

== Early life and education ==
Hansen was born in Yankton, South Dakota. When Hansen was six years old, his father died. Six years later, Hansen's mom remarried and his family moved to Dell Rapids, South Dakota where he grew up along with his two sisters. Hansen attended Southeast Technical Institute, where he earned his associate degree in business administration. Hansen attended the University of Sioux Falls, where he earned his bachelor's degree in business management. Hansen graduated with Sterling Honors from the University of South Dakota School of Law.

== Career ==
Hansen is a lawyer at Dell Rapids Law Firm in Dell Rapids, South Dakota. Hansen represents families as their adoption attorney.

== Political career ==
=== Tenure ===
In 2010, Hansen defeated incumbent Democrat Oran Sorenson, winning a seat in the South Dakota House of Representatives. Hansen was reelected in 2012. In 2013, Hansen left public office to attend the University of South Dakota School of Law. Upon Hansen's departure, Governor Dennis Daugaard said, "in his second term, Jon has already stood out as a leader, and I hope to see him return to public service in the future."

In 2018, Hansen returned to the South Dakota House of Representatives by defeating incumbent Democrat Dan Ahlers. Hansen was also victorious in a Republican primary election earlier that same year.

Hansen Represents South Dakota's 25th Legislative District, which "includes the towns and rural areas surrounding Baltic, Colton, Dell Rapids, Garretson, Lyons, Flandreau, Sherman, Crooks, Humboldt, Colman, Trent and northern Sioux Falls."

=== Leadership Positions ===
Hansen currently serves as Speaker of the House of Representatives.

Hansen currently serves as Chairman of the House Legislative Procedure Committee. He also served as Chairman of the House Judiciary Committee from 2019-2024. Hansen also served as Vice Chairman of the House Judiciary Committee in 2013.

=== Committee assignments ===
==== 2025 - Present ====
- House State Affairs Committee
- House Legislative Procedure Committee

==== 2019 – 2024 ====
- House Judiciary Committee – Chairman
- House State Affairs Committee
- House Legislative Procedure Committee

==== 2013 ====
- House Judiciary Committee – Vice chairman
- House State Affairs Committee
- House Legislative Procedure Committee

==== 2011 – 2012 ====
- House Judiciary
- House Transportation

=== Awards ===
In 2019, Hansen received the Americans for Prosperity Torchbearer Award "for his tremendous record of voting to break down barriers for South Dakotans and for his sponsorship of legislation to expand education opportunities for our students."

In 2019, Hansen received the American Conservative Union's Award for Conservative Achievement.

== Political positions ==
=== Abortion ===
Hansen opposes abortion. He is a current board member and executive committee member of South Dakota Right to Life. Hansen received an "A" rating from South Dakota Right to Life for his anti-abortion legislative voting record.

==== House Resolution 1003 ====
In 2019, Hansen sponsored House Resolution 1003, denouncing the recent passage of New York's abortion law and requesting that the Governor declare a day of prayer and fasting to atone for the unspeakable crime of abortion.

==== House Bill 1193 ====
In 2019, Hansen sponsored House Bill 1193, which "provide[s] a criminal penalty for causing an abortion against a pregnant mother's will." Anyone found guilty under the bill faces mandatory life in prison.

House Bill 1193 passed on the floor of the House of Representatives with 68 yea votes and 0 nay votes. The bill passed on the floor of the Senate with 32 yay votes and 0 nay votes. Governor Kristi Noem signed House Bill 1193 on March 20, 2019.

==== Senate Bill 110 ====
In 2018, Hansen appeared before the Senate State Affairs Committee to testify in favor of Senate Bill 110. Senate Bill 110 specifically criticized the Planned Parenthood facility in Sioux Falls, South Dakota for allegedly failing to adequately provide the required pre-abortion counseling to pregnant mothers under South Dakota law. Senate Bill 110 also required pregnancy help centers in South Dakota to provide the disclosures that it claimed Planned Parenthood was failing to provide.

==== House Concurrent Resolution 1002 ====
In 2013, Hansen co-sponsored House Concurrent Resolution 1002, urging the United States Supreme Court to revisit the Roe v. Wade case and to overturn its decision. The Resolution passed the South Dakota House of Representative on a vote of 60 to 10 and passed the South Dakota Senate on a vote of 23 to 10.

==== House Bill 1237 ====
In 2013, Hansen sponsored House Bill 1237, which excludes weekends and holidays from the calculation of the 72-hour waiting period required between a pregnant mother's initial consultation with an abortion care provider and an abortion procedure. The 72-hour waiting period requirement was passed into South Dakota law in 2011 via House Bill 1217, which Hansen also co-sponsored. During the 72-hour waiting period, House Bill 1217 also required that the pregnant mother have a consultation at a pregnancy help center during which the pregnancy help center "inform[s] [the pregnant mother] about what education, counseling, and other assistance is available to help the pregnant mother," and also screens for "circumstances that may subject [the pregnant mother's] decision to coercion."

==== House Bill 1185 ====
In 2012, Hansen sponsored House Bill 1185 which prohibits all health care plans offered through the Affordable Care Act in South Dakota from including abortion coverage. House Bill 1185 was signed into law by Governor Dennis Daugaard on March 19, 2012.

==== House Bill 1217 ====
In 2011, Hansen co-sponsored House Bill 1217, which, among other provisions, requires a 72-hour waiting period between a pregnant mother's initial consultation with an abortion care provider and an abortion procedure. At the time, the 72-hour waiting period was reportedly the longest in the nation. Under the bill, during the 72-hour waiting period, the pregnant mother must have a consultation at a pregnancy help center at which the pregnancy help center "inform[s] her about what education, counseling, and other assistance is available to help the pregnant mother keep and care for her child." The pregnancy help center also conducts a private interview with the pregnant mother to help ensure that she is not being coerced into making her decision to abort her unborn child. House Bill 1217 was signed into law by Governor Dennis Daugaard on March 28, 2011.

=== Intellectual diversity on college campuses ===
On February 19, 2019, on the floor of the House of Representatives, Hansen spoke in favor of House Bill 1087, an act to "promote free speech and intellectual diversity at certain institutions of higher education." House Bill 1087 was signed into law by Governor Kristi Noem on March 29, 2019.

On June 26, 2019, the South Dakota Board of Regents convened to discuss House Bill 1087.

=== Second Amendment ===
Hansen "has been endorsed three times by the NRA and has received an 'A' rating from the Association because of his 'demonstrated record of support on Second Amendment issues.'"

In 2019, Hansen supported Senate Bill 47, which allows individuals in South Dakota to carry a concealed weapon without a permit. Governor Kristi Noem signed Senate Bill 47 into law on February 5, 2019.

=== Taxes and budget ===
Hansen has signed the Americans for Tax Reform Taxpayer Protection Pledge, "pledg[ing] to the taxpayers of the State of South Dakota, that [he] will oppose and vote against any and all efforts to increase taxes."

In 2012, Hansen voted in favor of House Joint Resolution 1007, which "[p]ropos[ed] and submitt[ed] to the electors at the next general election an amendment to Article XII of the Constitution of the State of South Dakota, relating to a balanced budget." The passage of House Joint Resolution 1007 resulted in "The South Dakota Budget Balance Amendment, also known as Constitutional Amendment P," being placed on the November 2012 general election ballot. The South Dakota Budget Balance Amendment was approved by the voters of South Dakota by a 64.6% to 35.4% vote.

In 2010, the State of South Dakota faced a $127 million budget deficit. In his 2010 campaign, Hansen pledged to vote to balance the state budget without raising taxes. During the 2011 legislative session, Hansen voted in favor of the general budget bill, which eliminated the state's $127 million budget deficit and balanced the state budget without raising taxes.

== Personal life ==
Hansen resides in Dell Rapids, South Dakota with his wife, Sheila, and their six children. Hansen is Catholic and a member of St. Mary Parish in Dell Rapids.

Hansen has served as President of the Dell Rapids Chamber of Commerce.

== Electoral history ==
South Dakota House of Representatives District 25 General Election, 2020
Party	Candidate	Votes	%
Republican	Jon Hansen	7826	32.9
Republican	Tom Pischke	7784	32.7
Democrat	Jeff Barth	4460	18.7
Democrat	Jared Nieuwenhuis	3720	15.6

South Dakota House of Representatives District 25 General Election, 2018
Party	Candidate	Votes	%
Republican	Jon Hansen	5982	32.00
Republican	Tom Pischke	5272	28.20
Democrat	Dan Ahlers	5174	27.68
Democrat	B.J. Motley	2266	12.12

South Dakota House of Representatives District 25 Primary Election, 2018
Party	Canididate	Votes	%
Republican	Jon Hansen	1450	41.69
Republican	Tom Pischke	1277	36.72
Republican	Tamera R. Enalls	751	21.59

South Dakota House of Representatives District 25 General Election, 2012
Party	Candidate	Votes	%
Republican	Jon Hansen	6217	33.60
Republican	Scott W. Ecklund	5718	30.90
Democrat	Bill Laird	3686	19.92
Democrat	Janelle Smedsrud	2332	15.58

South Dakota House of Representatives District 25 General Election, 2010
Party	Candidate	Votes	%
Republican	Stace Nelson	4814	27.34
Republican	Jon Hansen	4579	26.00
Democrat	Oran A. Sorenson	3859	21.91
Democrat	Dennis Van Overschelde	2918	16.57
Independent	Kevin R Crisp	1441	8.18

South Dakota House of Representatives
Preceded by Spencer Gosch	Speaker pro tempore of the South Dakota House of Representatives; 2021–2023	Succeeded by Mike Stevens
Political offices
Preceded by Hugh Bartels	Speaker of the South Dakota House of Representatives; 2025–present	Incumbent
