= David Anderson (South Dakota politician) =

American politician

Member of the South Dakota House of Representatives from the 16th district
- Incumbent
- Assumed office May 13, 2013 Serving with Jim Bolin
- Preceded by: Patty Miller

Personal details
- Born: May 14, 1956 (age 70)
- Party: Republican
- Parent: O. L. Anderson (father)
- Education: South Dakota State University

David L. Anderson (born May 14, 1956) is an American politician and a Republican member of the South Dakota House of Representatives representing District 16 since May 13, 2013. He was appointed by Governor Dennis Daugaard after Patty Miller resigned.
