= Jess Olson =

American politician (born 1985)

Member of the South Dakota House of Representatives from the 34th district
- In office January 2019 – November 13, 2023
- Preceded by: David Lust
- Succeeded by: Becky Drury

Personal details
- Born: January 29, 1985 (age 41) Rapid City, South Dakota, U.S.
- Party: Republican
- Spouse: Eric
- Education: Dartmouth College (BA); University of North Carolina-Chapel Hill (MHA)
- Profession: Business Owner
- Website: www.jessolsonsd.com

Jess Olson (born January 29, 1985) is an American politician and a former Republican Representative of the South Dakota House of Representatives, representing District 34 from 2019 to 2023.

== Early life and education ==
Jess Olson was born in Rapid City, South Dakota. She attended Dartmouth College where she received her B.A. in English Literature. She then completed her master's degree in Healthcare Administration at the University of North Carolina-Chapel Hill in 2011.

== Healthcare career ==
Olson graduated from the Gillings School of Global Public Health at the University of North Carolina-Chapel Hill in 2011. She served as executive director for Wellfully, a non-profit behavioral healthcare organization serving at-risk youth from 2012 to 2018. In 2019, she launched a home health company, Stay Graceful, Inc.

== Political career ==
In the four-way November 6, 2018 General election, Olson took the first seat with 5,853 votes (32%) and Representative Michael Diedrich took the second seat ahead of Democratic candidates George Nelson and Brian Davis.

In November 2023, Olson announced her resignation from the South Dakota House due to health issues.
