= Rocky Blare =

American politician and insurance agent

Member of the South Dakota House of Representatives from the 21st district
- Incumbent
- Assumed office January 12, 2021
- Preceded by: Caleb Finck

Member of the South Dakota Senate from the 21st district
- In office 2019–2021
- Succeeded by: Erin Tobin

Personal details
- Party: Republican

Rocky Blare is an American politician and insurance agent serving as a member of the South Dakota House of Representatives from the 21st district. He previously represented the same district in the South Dakota Senate from 2019 to 2021.

Blare lives outside Ideal, South Dakota with his wife, a public school teacher.

== Election history ==
- 2018: Blare was elected with 4,918 votes to the South Dakota Senate defeating Julie Bartling who received 4,084 votes.
- 2020: Blare was elected to the South Dakota House of Representatives with 6,330 votes; Caleb Finck was also re-elected with 5,038 votes and Jessica Hegge received 2,911 votes.
