= William Shorma =

American politician

Member of the South Dakota Senate from the 16th district
- Incumbent
- Assumed office April 30, 2015
- Preceded by: Dan Lederman

Personal details
- Born: July 7, 1955 (age 71)
- Party: Republican
- Profession: Businessman

William Shorma (born July 7, 1955) is an American politician. He serves as a Republican member of the South Dakota Senate, where he represents District 16 (encompassing parts of Lincoln County and Union County).
