= Will Mortenson =

American attorney and politician

Majority Leader of the South Dakota House of Representatives
- In office January 10, 2023 – January 14, 2025
- Preceded by: Kent Peterson
- Succeeded by: Scott Odenbach

Member of the South Dakota House of Representatives from the 24th district
- Incumbent
- Assumed office January 12, 2021 Serving with Mike Weisgram
- Preceded by: Tim Rounds; Mary Duvall

Personal details
- Born: January 1, 1988 (age 38) Pierre, South Dakota, U.S.
- Party: Republican
- Education: University of South Dakota (BA); University of Virginia (JD)

Will D. Mortenson is an American attorney and a member of the South Dakota House of Representatives representing the 24th district since January 2021.

== Early life and education ==
Mortenson was born in Pierre, South Dakota and graduated from T. F. Riggs High School. He is an enrolled member of the Cheyenne River Sioux Tribe.

Mortenson attended University of South Dakota where he received his B.A. He ran the 2010 reelection campaign of Public Utilities Commissioner Dusty Johnson, then worked in the Office of Governor Dennis Daugaard as a policy analyst, before attending the University of Virginia School of Law graduating with his J.D. in 2016.

== Political career ==
Mortenson first ran for the South Dakota House of Representatives from District 24 in 2020. He won the primary in June 2020 and the general election on November 3, 2020. In 2021, Mortenson filed articles of impeachment against Attorney General Jason Ravnsborg, and again in 2022, leading to Ravnsborg's removal from office.

In 2022, Mortenson was selected to serve as House Majority Leader by his Republican colleagues in the State House of Representatives. He is the youngest Republican to serve as House Majority Leader in state history, and the first tribal member to lead a majority caucus.

== Election history ==
2020 South Dakota House of Representatives District 24 General election
Party	Candidate	Votes	%
Republican	Will Mortenson	8,410	43.63%
Republican	Mike Weisgram	7,786	40.39%
Democratic	Amanda Bachmann	3,079	15.97%
Total votes		19,275	100.0%
Republican hold			
Republican hold			

South Dakota House of Representatives
Preceded by Kent Peterson	Majority Leader of the South Dakota House of Representatives; 2023–2025	Succeeded by Scott Odenbach
