= Lynn Schneider =

American politician

Member of the South Dakota House of Representatives from the 22nd district
- Incumbent
- Assumed office May 8, 2020 Serving with Roger D. Chase
- Preceded by: Bob Glanzer

Personal details
- Born: Beadle County, South Dakota, U.S.
- Party: Republican
- Children: 3
- Education: Huron University (BA)

Military service
- Branch/service: United States Army
- Years of service: 1970–1971
- Battles/wars: Vietnam War

Lynn Schneider is an American politician serving as a member of the South Dakota House of Representatives from the 22nd district. He was appointed to the House by Governor Kristi Noem on May 8, 2020, succeeding Bob Glanzer.

== Early life and education ==
Schneider was born and raised on a farm in rural Beadle County, South Dakota. After graduating from Huron High School, he earned a Bachelor of Arts degree in economics and business from Huron University.

== Career ==
Schneider served in the United States Army during the Vietnam War in 1970 and 1971. He then worked in the banking industry for 41 years, including as CEO of F&M Marquette Bank and American Bank & Trust. He was appointed to the South Dakota House of Representatives by Governor Kristi Noem on May 8, 2020, succeeding Bob Glanzer.
