= Neil Pinnow =

American politician

Member of the South Dakota House of Representatives from the 28B district
- In office January 10, 2023 – January 14, 2025
- Succeeded by: Travis Ismay

Personal details
- Party: Republican
- Education: Dickinson State University

Neil Pinnow is an American politician. He was a Republican member for the 28B district of the South Dakota House of Representatives.
