= Drew Peterson (politician) =

American politician in the South Dakota House of Representatives

Member of the South Dakota House of Representatives from the 19th district
- Incumbent
- Assumed office January 10, 2023 Serving with Jessica Bahmuller

Personal details
- Party: Republican
- Education: University of South Dakota

Drew Peterson is an American politician. He has served as a member of the South Dakota House of Representatives from the 19th district since 2023, alongside Jessica Bahmuller. He is a member of the Republican Party.
