= Marli Wiese =

American politician

Member of the South Dakota House of Representatives from the 8th district
- In office January 31, 2017 – January 10, 2023 Serving with Leslie Heinemann
- Preceded by: Mathew Wollmann

Personal details
- Born: February 20, 1953 (age 73)
- Party: Republican
- Spouse: Reggie
- Children: 3
- Education: Nettleton Commercial College
- Profession: Farmer

Marli Wiese (born February 20, 1953) is an American politician who served as a Republican member for District 8 of the South Dakota House of Representatives from 2017 to 2023, representing Lake, Miner, Moody, and Sanborn counties. Wiese served on the education and taxation committees.

Wiese was appointed by Governor Dennis Daugaard to fill a vacancy after Mathew Wollmann's resignation earlier that month.

Wiese attended Madison High School in Madison, South Dakota and Nettleton Commercial College. She lives in Madison and is a farmer. Wiese acted as the vice chair of the Lake County Republican Party prior to assuming office.
