= Tina Mulally =

American politician and businesswoman

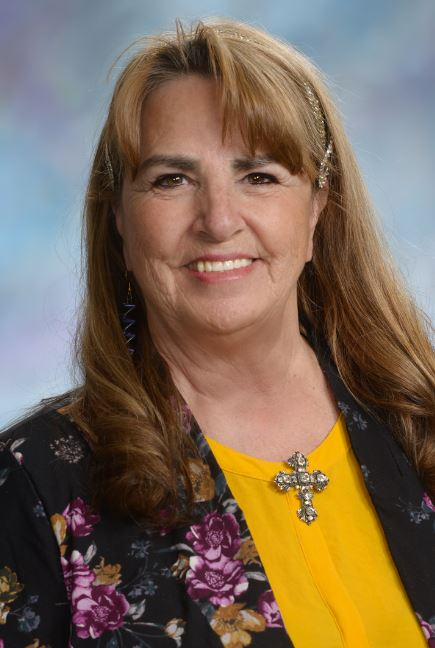

Member of the South Dakota House of Representatives from the 35th district
- Incumbent
- Assumed office January 8, 2019

Personal details
- Born: May 28, 1957 (age 69)
- Party: Republican

Tina Mulally (born May 28, 1957) is an American politician and businesswoman serving as a member of the South Dakota House of Representatives from the 35th district. Elected in 2018, Mulally assumed office in 2019.

== Background ==
Mulally is a resident of Rapid City, South Dakota, where she operates a small business. In 2020, Mulally was selected to serve on the Mental Health of First Responders Task Force. Mulally is a member of the Republican Party. Committees include: House Appropriations; House Local Governments; House Agriculture and Natural Resources; Commerce and Energy; and Transportation.

Tina Mulally was first elected to the South Dakota House of Representatives representing District 35 in 2018. Mulally has received the Award for Conservative Excellence in 2019 and the Award for Conservative Achievement in both 2020 and 2021 from the American Conservative Union Foundation. Mulally was endorsed by the NRA both in 2020 and 2022, and has received “A” ratings from the National Rifle Association, SD Right to Life, Family Heritage Alliance, and SD Citizens for Liberty. Mulally won her 2022 primary and general election, against a Democratic challenger. Mulally was a founder of the South Dakota Freedom Caucus in 2022, and currently serves as both the Secretary and Treasurer.
