= Rhonda Milstead =

American politician and businesswoman

Member of the South Dakota House of Representatives from the 9th district
- In office January 7, 2019 – January 10, 2023

Personal details
- Born: January 18, 1957 (age 69)
- Party: Republican

Rhonda Milstead (born January 18, 1957) is an American politician and businesswoman who served as a member of the South Dakota House of Representatives from the 9th district from 2019 to 2023. Milstead was appointed to the House by Governor Kristi Noem in December 2018 and assumed office on January 7, 2019.

Milstead lives in Hartford, South Dakota.
