= Randy Gross =

American politician

Member of the South Dakota House of Representatives from the 25th district
- In office January 10, 2023 – January 14, 2025

Member of the South Dakota House of Representatives from the 8th district
- In office January 8, 2019 – January 9, 2023

Personal details
- Born: February 27, 1949 (age 77)
- Party: Republican
- Spouse: Susan Gross
- Children: 4

Randy Gross is a politician who served in the South Dakota House of Representatives from 2019 to 2025. From 2019 to 2023, he represented District 8, which encompassed Lake, Miner, Moody, and Sanborn counties. In 2022, he won one of two seats in the District 25 House election, representing Minnehaha and Moody counties. Gross did not appear on the 2024 Republican primary ballot.

Gross was an executive board member of the South Dakota Legislative Research Council from 2019 to 2020 and from 2023 to 2024.
