= Lance Koth =

American politician

Member, South Dakota House of Representatives, 20th District
- Incumbent
- Assumed office 2019

Personal details
- Party: Republican

Lance R. Koth is an American politician. He is a Republican representing the 20th district in the South Dakota House of Representatives.

== Political career ==
In 2018, Koth ran for election to one of two seats representing District 20 in the South Dakota House of Representatives. He and fellow Republican Paul Miskimins won against Democrats Ione Klinger and James Schorzmann.

As of July 2020, Koth sits on the following committees:

- Committee on Appropriations
- Joint Committee on Appropriations
- Interim Appropriations Committee

=== Electoral record ===
2018 general election: South Dakota House of Representatives, District 20
Party	Candidate	Votes	%
Republican	Paul Miskimins	5,429	33.2%
Republican	Lance Koth	4,756	29.1%
Democratic	Ione Klinger	3,297	20.2%
Democratic	James Schorzmann	2,866	17.5%
