= Kirk Chaffee =

American politician and businessman

Member of the South Dakota House of Representatives from the 29th district
- Incumbent
- Assumed office 2019

Personal details
- Born: November 22, 1963 (age 62) South Dakota, U.S.
- Party: Republican

Kirk Chaffee (born November 22, 1963) is an American politician and businessman serving as a member of the South Dakota House of Representatives from the 29th district. Elected in 2018, Chaffee assumed office in 2019.

== Background ==
Chaffee was born in South Dakota and resides in Whitewood. He served as the director of equalization and planning for Meade County, South Dakota for 31 years. He also worked as a business consultant for the city of Sturgis, South Dakota.
