= Richard Thomason =

American politician

State Legislator
- Former
- In office January 12, 2021 – January 10, 2023

Personal details
- Born: Louisville, Kentucky
- Party: Republican

Richard L. Thomason is an American businessman and politician who served as a member of the South Dakota House of Representatives for the 13th district. Elected in November 2020, he assumed office on January 12, 2021, and left office January 10, 2023. He is currently running for an open At-Large city council seat in Sioux Falls, South Dakota.

== Early life and education ==
Thomason was born in Louisville, Kentucky and moved with his family to Sioux Falls, South Dakota in 1994. After graduating from Lincoln High School, he earned a Bachelor of Science degree in real estate from the University of St. Thomas in Minneapolis.

== Career ==
Outside of politics, Thomason works as a Relationship Manager at Central Bank in Sioux Falls. He was elected to the South Dakota House of Representatives in November 2020 and assumed office on January 12, 2021. In the 2021–2022 legislative session, Thomason was a member of the House Local Government Committee and House Taxation Committee.
