= Fred Deutsch =

American politician

Member of the South Dakota House of Representatives from the 4th district

Personal details
- Born: March 9, 1957 (age 69)
- Party: Republican
- Profession: Chiropractor

Fred Deutsch (born March 9, 1957) is an American politician and a Republican member of the South Dakota House of Representatives representing District 4. Deutsch lost a bid for the South Dakota Senate in the 2024 Republican Primary; his term as State Representative ended in January 2025. Deutsch lives in rural Florence, which is near Watertown, South Dakota and in Codington County in the northeast portion of the state.

== Background ==
Deutsch previously served nine years on the Watertown Board of Education, and was first elected to the state house in 2014. He was re-elected in 2018, coming in first in a five-way race. He first attempted to run for the District 4 seat in 2012 but lost, placing third after Democrats Kathy Tyler and Jim Peterson.

Deutsch is a chiropractor, as is his wife Kathleen. He practices at Deutsch Chiropractic in Watertown, SD. He graduated from Kalamazoo College in 1979 and obtained a chiropractic degree from Northwestern Health Sciences University in 1983.

== Transgender legislation ==
In February 2016, Deutsch drew national attention for introducing one of the earliest bathroom bills, which aimed to make it illegal for public school students to use a bathroom, shower room or locker room for a sex other than their sex at birth. The bill was vetoed by Republican Governor Dennis Daugaard.

In 2020, Deutsch introduced a bill that would make it a felony for pediatricians to provide sex change operations or opposite-sex hormones to youth ages 15 and under, punishing doctors with up to ten years in prison. The bill received strong opposition from physicians. It passed the State House of Representatives but was defeated in the State Senate. The bill was developed by Deutsch in coalition with a secretive network of anti-transgender activists involved with conservative groups such as Alliance Defending Freedom, the American College of Pediatricians, Eagle Forum, Liberty Counsel, and the Christian Medical and Dental Associations. One member was Elisa Rae Shupe, who at the time had detransitioned. Shupe later retransitioned and disavowed her involvement. Though the bill failed, it was influential in the development of more successful anti-trans bills in numerous other states. An updated version of Deutsch's bill led by Bethany Soye was passed and signed into law in February 2023.

== 2024 Republican Primary Election ==
The South Dakota Republican Primary Election was held on June 4, 2024. Fred Deutsch faced off against fellow District 4 State Representative Stephanie Sauder of Bryant, South Dakota. South Dakota News Watch listed the race as one of the top 5 primaries in the state to watch. Stu Whitney, writing for South Dakota News Watch, said, "Nowhere is the trend of establishment vs. far right more pronounced than in this district of rural counties surrounding Watertown, where longtime state Rep. Fred Deu[s]tch is running for Senate."

In the end, Sauder received 1,868 votes (51%) to Deutsch's 1,804 (49%). Sauder won Clark and Hamlin counties while Deutsch won Roberts, Codington, Deuel, and Grant. With results qualifying for a recount, Deutsch stated to Keloland News that he intended to seek a recount.

Without any statewide Republican races, statewide voter turnout stalled at 17.09% (101,028 votes) of all registered voters; 76,644 of 287,376 registered Republicans voted.

This was not the first contest between Deutsch and Sauder. Previously in 2022, Deutsch and Sauder were the successful candidates in a four-way primary where Sauder bested Deutsch by 59 votes out of 7,132 total votes.
