= Kaleb Weis =

American politician

Member of the South Dakota House of Representatives from the 2nd district
- Incumbent
- Assumed office 2019

Personal details
- Born: 1983/1984 (age 36–37)
- Party: Republican
- Spouse: Kayla
- Children: 3
- Education: Lake Area Technical College

Kaleb W. Weis (born 1983/1984) is an American politician serving as a member of the South Dakota House of Representatives from the 2nd district. An HVAC specialist by trade, Weis was elected to the House in 2018 and assumed office in 2019.

== Background ==
A resident of Aberdeen, South Dakota, Weis attended Tripp-Delmont High School and the Lake Area Technical College. Weis and his wife, Kayla, have three children.
