= Steve Duffy =

American politician

Member of the South Dakota House of Representatives from the 32nd district
- Incumbent
- Assumed office January 10, 2023

Personal details
- Party: Republican

Steve Duffy is an American politician. He serves as a Republican member for the 32nd district of the South Dakota House of Representatives.
