= Caleb Finck =

American farmer, businessman, and politician

Caleb Fink

Member of the South Dakota House of Representatives from the 21st district
- Incumbent
- Assumed office 2019

Personal details
- Born: Tripp, South Dakota, U.S.
- Party: Republican
- Education: South Dakota State University (BS)

Caleb Finck is an American farmer, businessman, and politician serving as a member of the South Dakota House of Representatives from the 21st district. He assumed office in 2019.

== Background ==
Finck was born in Tripp, South Dakota, and earned a Bachelor of Science degree from South Dakota State University, where he studied communication, education, and agricultural leadership.
