= Mary Fitzgerald (politician) =

American politician

Member of the South Dakota House of Representatives from the 31st district
- Incumbent
- Assumed office January 12, 2021

Personal details
- Born: Vermillion, South Dakota, U.S.
- Party: Republican
- Spouse(s): Honorable John H Fitzgerald, Circuit Judge
- Children: 3
- Education: Black Hills State University (BS)

Mary J. Fitzgerald is an American politician and accountant serving as a member of the South Dakota House of Representatives from the 31st district. Elected in November 2020, she assumed office on January 12, 2021. Fitzgerald was re-elected to the SD House of Representatives on November 8, 2022 and November 5, 2024.

== Early life and education ==
Fitzgerald was born in Vermillion, South Dakota. She attended the University of South Dakota and earned a Bachelor of Science degree in accounting and business administration from Black Hills State University.

== Political career ==
In 2023, she was elected vice chair of the South Dakota Republican Party. In 2026, she supported SB41, a bill that would criminalize deepfakes stating, "It’s only fun and games until it happens to you." She also opposed South Dakota's parental rights bill believing the bill did not go far enough to protect abused, neglected or homeless children.
