= John Mills (South Dakota politician) =

American politician

Member of the South Dakota House of Representatives from the 4th district
- In office 2017–2025

Personal details
- Party: Republican

John H. Mills was a South Dakota politician and served in the South Dakota House of Representatives for district 08.

== Tenure in State House of Representatives ==
On February 24, 2022, Mills introduced a House Resolution entitled "Addressing the Governor's unacceptable actions in matters related to the appraiser certification program" against fellow Republican Governor Kristi Noem.
