= James Wangsness =

American politician and farmer

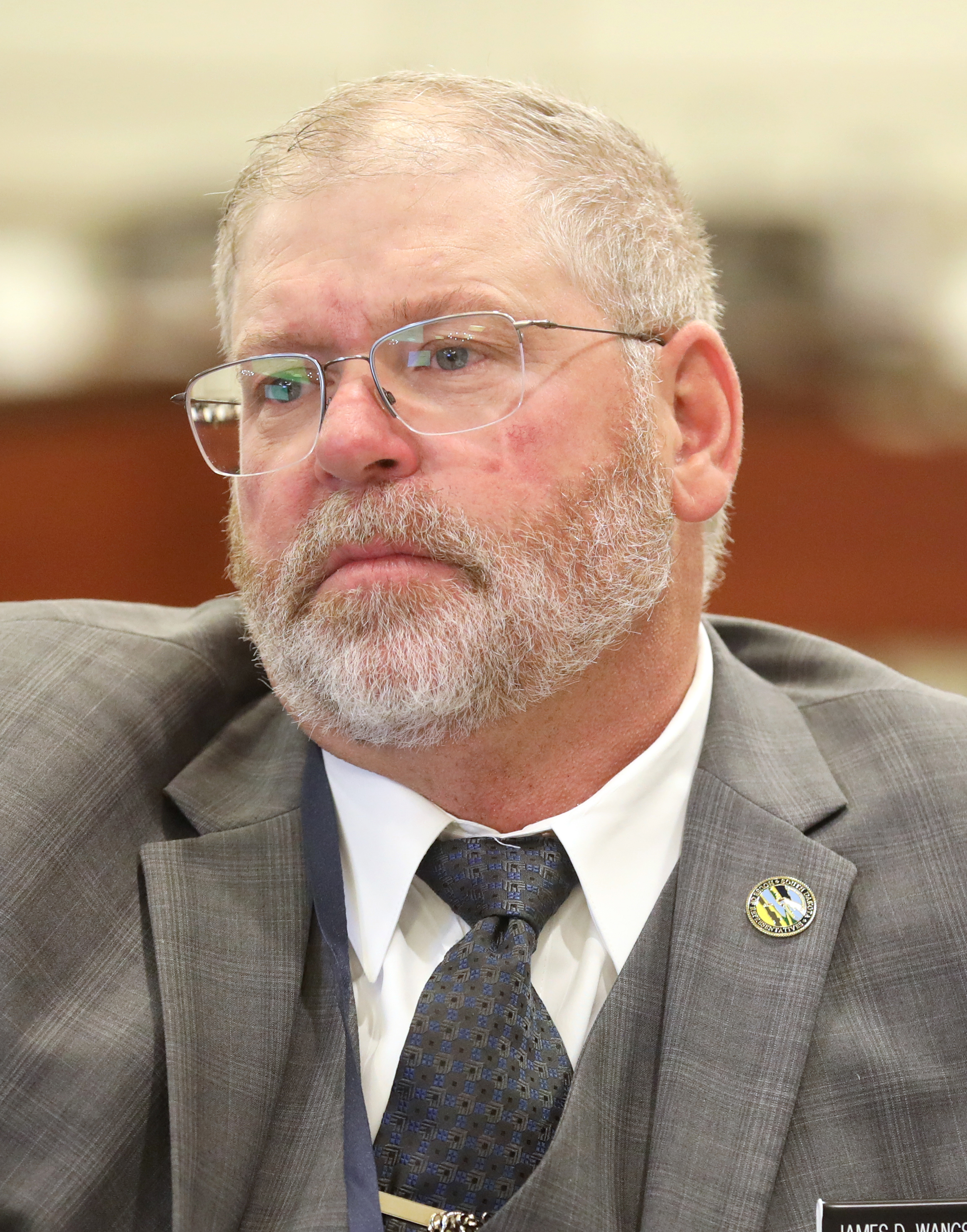

Member of the South Dakota House of Representatives from the 23rd district
- Incumbent
- Assumed office 2019
- Preceded by: Justin Cronin
- Succeeded by: Charles Hoffman (elect)

Member of the Hand County Commission
- In office 2013–2019

Personal details
- Party: Republican

James Wangsness is an American politician and farmer serving as a member of the South Dakota House of Representatives from the 23rd district. A former commissioner of Hand County, South Dakota, Wangsness was appointed to the House by Governor Kristi Noem in 2019 after the resignation of Justin Cronin.
