= Scott Moore (South Dakota politician) =

American politician

Member of the South Dakota House of Representatives from the 23rd district
- Incumbent
- Assumed office January 10, 2023

Personal details
- Party: Republican

Scott Moore is an American politician. He serves as a Republican member for the 23rd district of the South Dakota House of Representatives.
