= Tony Randolph =

American politician (born 1966)

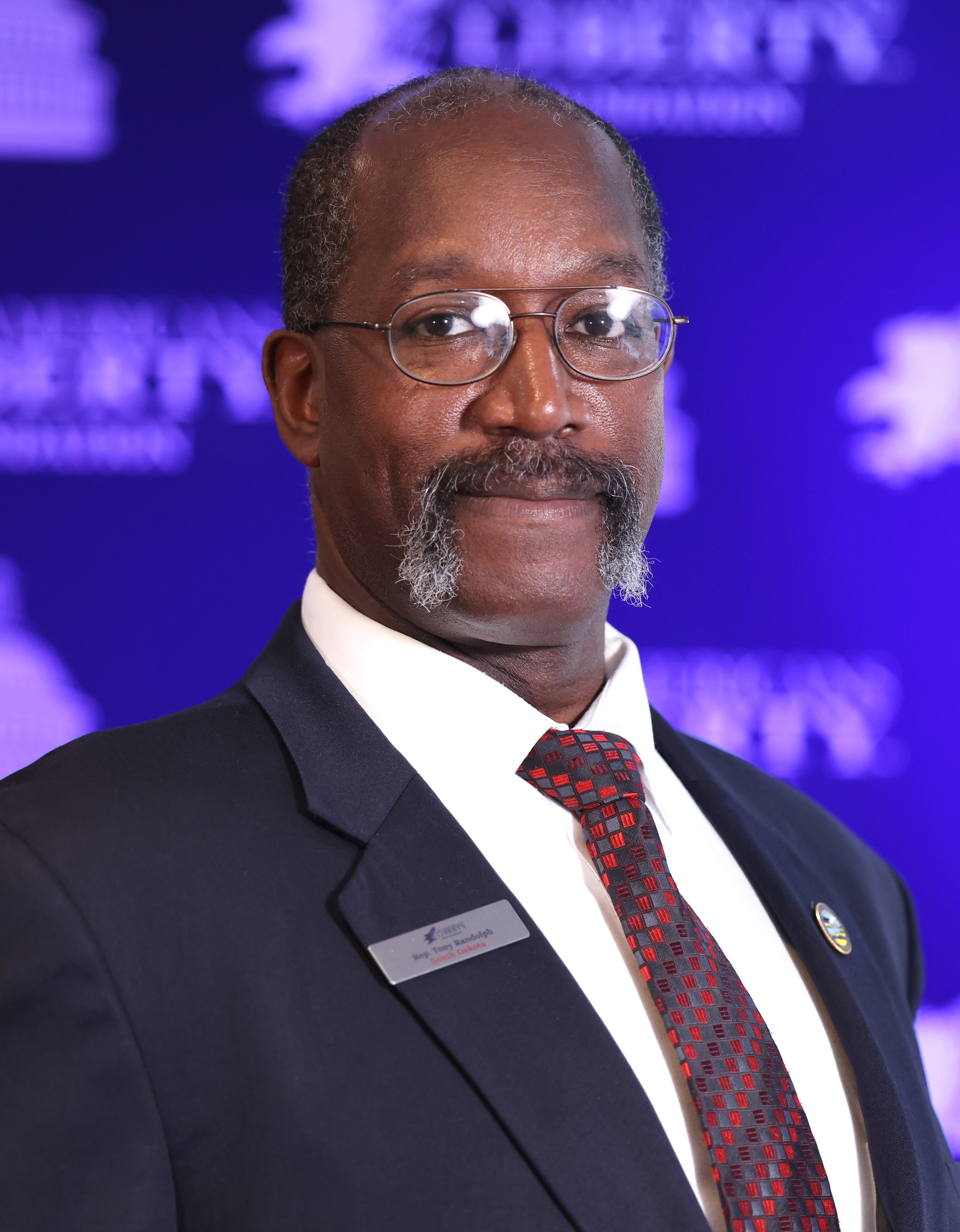
- Randolph at the 2024 Hazlitt Summit hosted by Young Americans for Liberty Foundation

Member of the South Dakota House of Representatives from the 35th district
- Incumbent
- Assumed office 2019

Personal details
- Born: April 1, 1966 (age 60) Franklin, Kentucky, U.S.
- Party: Republican
- Spouse: Audrey
- Children: 7

Tony Randolph (born April 1, 1966) is an American politician serving as a member of the South Dakota House of Representatives from the 35th district. He assumed office in 2019. Randolph is the only African American member of the South Dakota Legislature.

== Background ==
Randolph was born in Franklin, Kentucky. Prior to entering politics, he worked as an electrical contractor. Randolph and his wife, Audrey, have seven children. Randolph is a member of the Republican Party.
