= Roger D. Chase =

American politician

Member of the South Dakota House of Representatives from the 22 district
- In office January 10, 2017 – January 14, 2025

Personal details
- Born: July 18, 1966 (age 60)
- Party: Republican

Roger D. Chase is an American politician who served as a Republican member of the South Dakota House of Representatives from 2017 to 2024. He represented Beadle and Kingsbury counties.

Before assuming office, Chase was a farmer and real estate broker.

In May 2025, Chase was appointed by the Trump administration to be the state executive director of the Farm Service Agency in South Dakota.
