= 2022 South Dakota gubernatorial election =

- November 8, 2022
- Turnout: 59.40% ▼
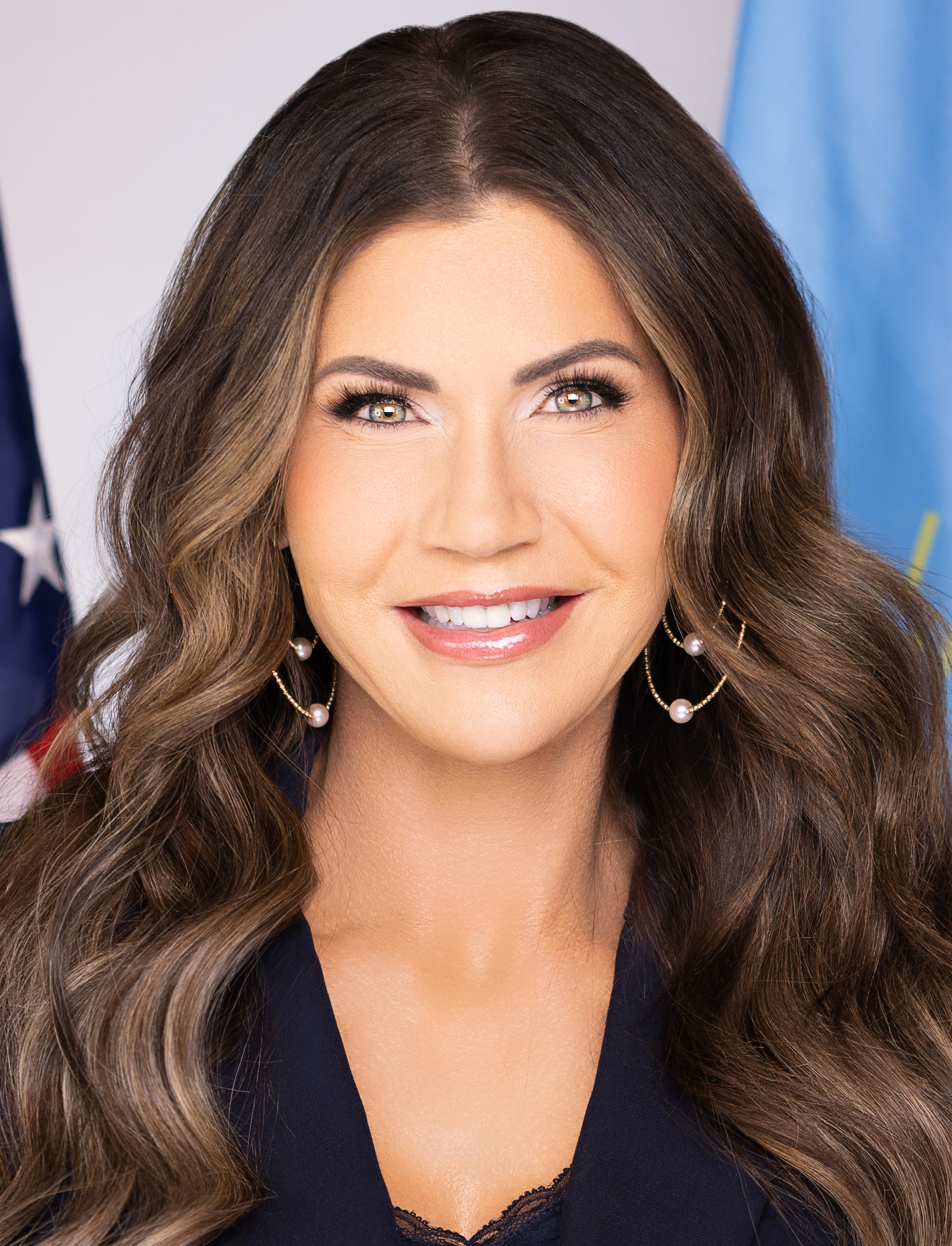

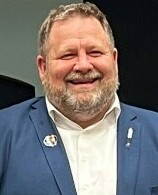
Nominee	Kristi Noem	Jamie Smith
Party	Republican	Democratic
Running mate	Larry Rhoden	Jennifer Healy Keintz
Popular vote	217,035	123,148
Percentage	61.98%	35.17%
- County results Noem: 50–60% 60–70% 70–80% 80–90% >90% Smith: 50–60% 70–80% 80–90%
Governor before election
Kristi Noem
Republican
Elected Governor
Kristi Noem
Republican

The 2022 South Dakota gubernatorial election took place on November 8, 2022, electing the governor of South Dakota. Incumbent Republican Governor Kristi Noem defeated Democratic nominee Jamie Smith to win a second term.

Despite speculation about this race potentially being competitive, Noem improved on her 2018 performance by 11 percentage points and won 17 counties that she lost in 2018. She also received over 44,000 more raw votes than she did in 2018, setting a record for the most votes received by a candidate for governor in South Dakota.

== Republican primary ==
=== Candidates ===
==== Nominee ====
- Kristi Noem, incumbent governor
  - Running mate: Larry Rhoden, incumbent lieutenant governor

==== Eliminated in primary ====
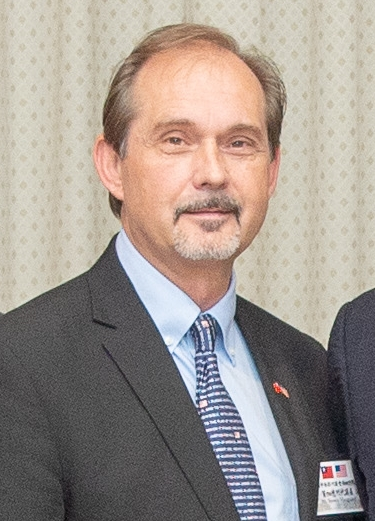
Former state house speaker Steven Haugaard challenged Noem in the primary but lost.

- Steven Haugaard, state representative and former Speaker of the South Dakota House of Representatives

==== Declined ====
- Lora Hubbel, former state representative, former chair of the Minnehaha County Republican Party and the South Dakota Constitution Party, and candidate for governor in 2014 and 2018 (running as an independent)
- Mark Mickelson, former Speaker of the South Dakota House of Representatives

=== Endorsements ===
Kristi Noem

U.S. executive branch officials

- Donald Trump, 45th president of the United States (2017–2021)

U.S. representatives

- Dusty Johnson, U.S. representative from South Dakota's at-large congressional district (2019–present)

State officials

- Marty Jackley, former attorney general of South Dakota (2009–2019) and candidate for Governor of South Dakota in 2018

=== Polling ===
Poll source	Date(s) administered	Sample size (Note: Key: A – all adults RV – registered voters LV – likely voters V – unclear)	Margin of error	Steven Haugaard	Kristi Noem	Undecided
South Dakota State University	May 2–15, 2022	– (LV)	± 3.0%	17%	61%	22%

=== Results ===
Results by county Noem: 50–60%; 60–70%; 70–80%; 80–90%

Republican primary results
Party	Candidate	Votes	%
Republican	Kristi Noem (incumbent)	91,661	76.4
Republican	Steven Haugaard	28,315	23.6
Total votes		119,976	100.0

== Democratic primary ==
=== Candidates ===
==== Nominee ====
- Jamie Smith, Minority Leader of the South Dakota House of Representatives
  - Running mate: Jennifer Healy Keintz, state representative

==== Declined ====
- Dan Ahlers, former state representative and nominee for U.S. Senate in 2020
- Remi Bald Eagle, former official for the Cheyenne River Sioux Tribe and nominee for the South Dakota Public Utilities Commission in 2020
- Kooper Caraway, president of the South Dakota Federation of Labor
- Troy Heinert, Minority Leader of the South Dakota Senate
- Steve Hildebrand, political strategist
- Mike Huether, former mayor of Sioux Falls
- Brendan Johnson, former U.S. Attorney for the District of South Dakota and son of former U.S. Senator Tim Johnson
- Peri Pourier, state representative
- Stephanie Herseth Sandlin, president of Augustana University and former U.S. representative for South Dakota's at-large congressional district
- Randy Seiler, chair of the South Dakota Democratic Party, former U.S. Attorney for the District of South Dakota, and nominee for attorney general in 2018
- Billie Sutton, former Minority Leader of the South Dakota Senate and nominee for governor in 2018
- Bob Sutton, businessman

== Libertarian convention ==
=== Candidates ===
==== Nominee ====
- Tracey Quint, coordinator
  - Running mate: Ashley Strand

== Independents ==
=== Candidates ===
==== Withdrew ====
- Lora Hubbel, former state representative, former chair of the Minnehaha County Republican Party and the South Dakota Constitution Party, and candidate for governor in 2014 and 2018 (running for State Senate)

== General election ==
=== Predictions ===
Source	Ranking	As of
The Cook Political Report	Solid R	March 4, 2022
Inside Elections	Solid R	March 4, 2022
Sabato's Crystal Ball	Safe R	January 26, 2022
Politico	Likely R	October 3, 2022
RCP	Likely R	September 25, 2022
Fox News	Solid R	May 12, 2022
538	Solid R	October 5, 2022
Elections Daily	Safe R	November 7, 2022

=== Polling ===
Poll source	Date(s) administered	Sample size	Margin of error	Kristi Noem (R)	Jamie Smith (D)	Other	Undecided
Emerson College	October 19–21, 2022	1,500 (LV)	± 2.4%	56%	37%	3% (Note: Quint (L) with 3%)	4%
Emerson College	October 19–21, 2022	1,500 (LV)	± 2.4%	57%	39%	4% (Note: Quint (L) with 4%)	–
South Dakota State University	September 28 – October 10, 2022	565 (RV)	± 4.0%	45%	41%	–	14%

=== Post-primary endorsements ===
Kristi Noem (R)

U.S. representatives

- Tulsi Gabbard, U.S. representative from Hawaii's 2nd congressional district (2013–2021) (Independent)

Statewide officials

- Glenn Youngkin, governor of Virginia (2022–2026)

Organizations

- NRA Political Victory Fund
- Susan B. Anthony List

=== Results ===
2022 South Dakota gubernatorial election
Party	Candidate	Votes	%	±%
Republican	Kristi Noem (incumbent); Larry Rhoden (incumbent)	217,035	61.98%	+11.01%
Democratic	Jamie Smith; Jennifer Healy Keintz	123,148	35.17%	−12.43%
Libertarian	Tracey Quint; Ashley Strand	9,983	2.85%	+1.42%
Total votes		350,166	100.00%	N/A
Republican hold				

==== By county ====
County	Kristi Noem Republican		Jamie Smith Democratic		Tracey Quint Libertarian		Margin		Total
County	#	%	#	%	#	%	#	%	Total
Aurora	894	73.64%	284	23.39%	36	2.97%	610	50.25%	1,214
Beadle	3,901	66.84%	1,716	29.40%	219	3.75%	2,185	37.44%	5,836
Bennett	619	60.39%	368	35.90%	38	3.71%	251	24.49%	1,025
Bon Homme	1,858	72.52%	650	25.37%	54	2.11%	1,208	47.15%	2,562
Brookings	6,974	56.12%	5,096	41.01%	357	2.87%	1,878	15.11%	12,427
Brown	8,456	60.56%	5,167	37.00%	341	2.44%	3,289	23.55%	13,964
Brule	1,463	69.37%	589	27.93%	57	2.70%	874	41.44%	2,109
Buffalo	144	36.27%	234	58.94%	19	4.79%	-90	-22.67%	397
Butte	3,211	76.71%	823	19.66%	152	3.63%	2,388	57.05%	4,186
Campbell	561	84.11%	93	13.94%	13	1.95%	468	70.16%	667
Charles Mix	2,187	70.75%	849	27.47%	55	1.78%	1,338	43.29%	3,091
Clark	1,223	76.44%	341	21.31%	36	2.25%	882	55.13%	1,600
Clay	2,054	43.29%	2,581	54.39%	110	2.32%	-527	-11.11%	4,745
Codington	7,520	67.87%	3,253	29.36%	307	2.77%	4,267	38.51%	11,080
Corson	522	56.25%	379	40.84%	27	2.91%	143	15.41%	928
Custer	3,633	71.56%	1,293	25.47%	151	2.97%	2,340	46.09%	5,077
Davison	4,887	67.51%	2,179	30.10%	173	2.39%	2,708	37.41%	7,239
Day	1,599	63.43%	876	34.75%	46	1.82%	723	28.68%	2,521
Deuel	1,479	74.28%	458	23.00%	54	2.71%	1,021	51.28%	1,991
Dewey	662	42.06%	862	54.76%	50	3.18%	-200	-12.71%	1,574
Douglas	1,272	85.71%	188	12.67%	24	1.62%	1,084	73.05%	1,484
Edmunds	1,321	77.66%	346	20.34%	34	2.00%	975	57.32%	1,701
Fall River	2,679	73.04%	859	23.42%	130	3.54%	1,820	49.62%	3,668
Faulk	771	80.73%	167	17.49%	17	1.78%	604	63.25%	955
Grant	2,328	72.41%	830	25.82%	57	1.77%	1,498	46.59%	3,215
Gregory	1,618	78.77%	393	19.13%	43	2.09%	1,225	59.64%	2,054
Haakon	892	90.37%	82	8.31%	13	1.32%	810	82.07%	987
Hamlin	2,118	77.58%	548	20.07%	64	2.34%	1,570	57.51%	2,730
Hand	1,177	78.36%	290	19.31%	35	2.33%	887	59.05%	1,502
Hanson	1,267	77.63%	336	20.59%	29	1.78%	931	57.05%	1,632
Harding	632	93.35%	33	4.87%	12	1.77%	599	88.48%	677
Hughes	4,571	61.38%	2,652	35.61%	224	3.01%	1,919	25.77%	7,447
Hutchinson	2,507	78.99%	604	19.03%	63	1.98%	1,903	59.96%	3,174
Hyde	460	80.00%	106	18.43%	9	1.57%	354	61.57%	575
Jackson	623	67.79%	280	30.47%	16	1.74%	343	37.32%	919
Jerauld	604	69.75%	238	27.48%	24	2.77%	366	42.26%	866
Jones	395	83.69%	64	13.56%	13	2.75%	331	70.13%	472
Kingsbury	1,792	70.25%	692	27.13%	67	2.63%	1,100	43.12%	2,551
Lake	3,131	63.05%	1,720	34.64%	115	2.32%	1,411	28.41%	4,966
Lawrence	7,749	63.28%	4,041	33.00%	456	3.72%	3,708	30.28%	12,246
Lincoln	16,828	59.76%	10,727	38.09%	606	2.15%	6,101	21.66%	28,161
Lyman	879	66.69%	405	30.73%	34	2.58%	474	35.96%	1,318
Marshall	1,123	59.42%	737	38.99%	30	1.59%	386	20.42%	1,890
McCook	1,851	72.67%	625	24.54%	71	2.79%	1,226	48.14%	2,547
McPherson	911	82.82%	167	15.18%	22	2.00%	744	67.64%	1,100
Meade	8,482	71.46%	2,887	24.32%	501	4.22%	5,595	47.14%	11,870
Mellette	386	61.27%	214	33.97%	30	4.76%	172	27.30%	630
Miner	732	72.69%	248	24.63%	27	2.68%	484	48.06%	1,007
Minnehaha	39,234	52.53%	33,376	44.69%	2,072	2.77%	5,858	7.84%	74,682
Moody	1,668	62.97%	910	34.35%	71	2.68%	758	28.61%	2,649
Oglala Lakota	221	8.91%	2,172	87.58%	87	3.51%	-1,951	-78.67%	2,480
Pennington	27,586	60.78%	16,215	35.73%	1,587	3.50%	11,371	25.05%	45,388
Perkins	1,142	83.24%	177	12.90%	53	3.86%	965	70.34%	1,372
Potter	892	81.16%	187	17.02%	20	1.82%	705	64.15%	1,099
Roberts	2,164	60.70%	1,315	36.89%	86	2.41%	849	23.81%	3,565
Sanborn	757	75.40%	226	22.51%	21	2.09%	531	52.89%	1,004
Spink	1,832	68.61%	765	28.65%	73	2.73%	1,067	39.96%	2,670
Stanley	999	69.04%	407	28.13%	41	2.83%	592	40.91%	1,447
Sully	597	75.76%	169	21.45%	22	2.79%	428	54.31%	788
Todd	402	20.87%	1,444	74.97%	80	4.15%	-1,042	-54.10%	1,926
Tripp	1,873	82.58%	364	16.05%	31	1.37%	1,509	66.53%	2,268
Turner	2,834	73.32%	919	23.78%	112	2.90%	1,915	49.55%	3,865
Union	4,723	70.07%	1,848	27.42%	169	2.51%	2,875	42.66%	6,740
Walworth	1,573	76.62%	430	20.94%	50	2.44%	1,143	55.67%	2,053
Yankton	5,247	58.89%	3,350	37.60%	313	3.51%	1,897	21.29%	8,910
Ziebach	345	50.51%	304	44.51%	34	4.98%	41	6.00%	683
Totals	217,035	61.98%	123,148	35.17%	9,983	2.85%	93,887	26.81%	350,166

Counties that flipped from Democratic to Republican

- Bon Homme (largest city: Springfield)
- Brookings (largest city: Brookings)
- Brown (largest city: Aberdeen)
- Charles Mix (largest city: Lake Andes)
- Corson (largest city: McLaughlin)
- Day (largest city: Webster)
- Hughes (largest city: Pierre)
- Lake (largest city: Madison)
- Marshall (largest city: Britton)
- Mellette (largest city: White River)
- Miner (largest city: Howard)
- Minnehaha (largest city: Sioux Falls)
- Moody (largest city: Flandreau)
- Roberts (largest city: Sisseton)
- Spink (largest city: Redfield)
- Yankton (largest city: Yankton)
- Ziebach (largest city: Dupree)

== See also ==
- 2022 South Dakota elections
