= 2018 South Dakota Attorney General election =

- November 6, 2018
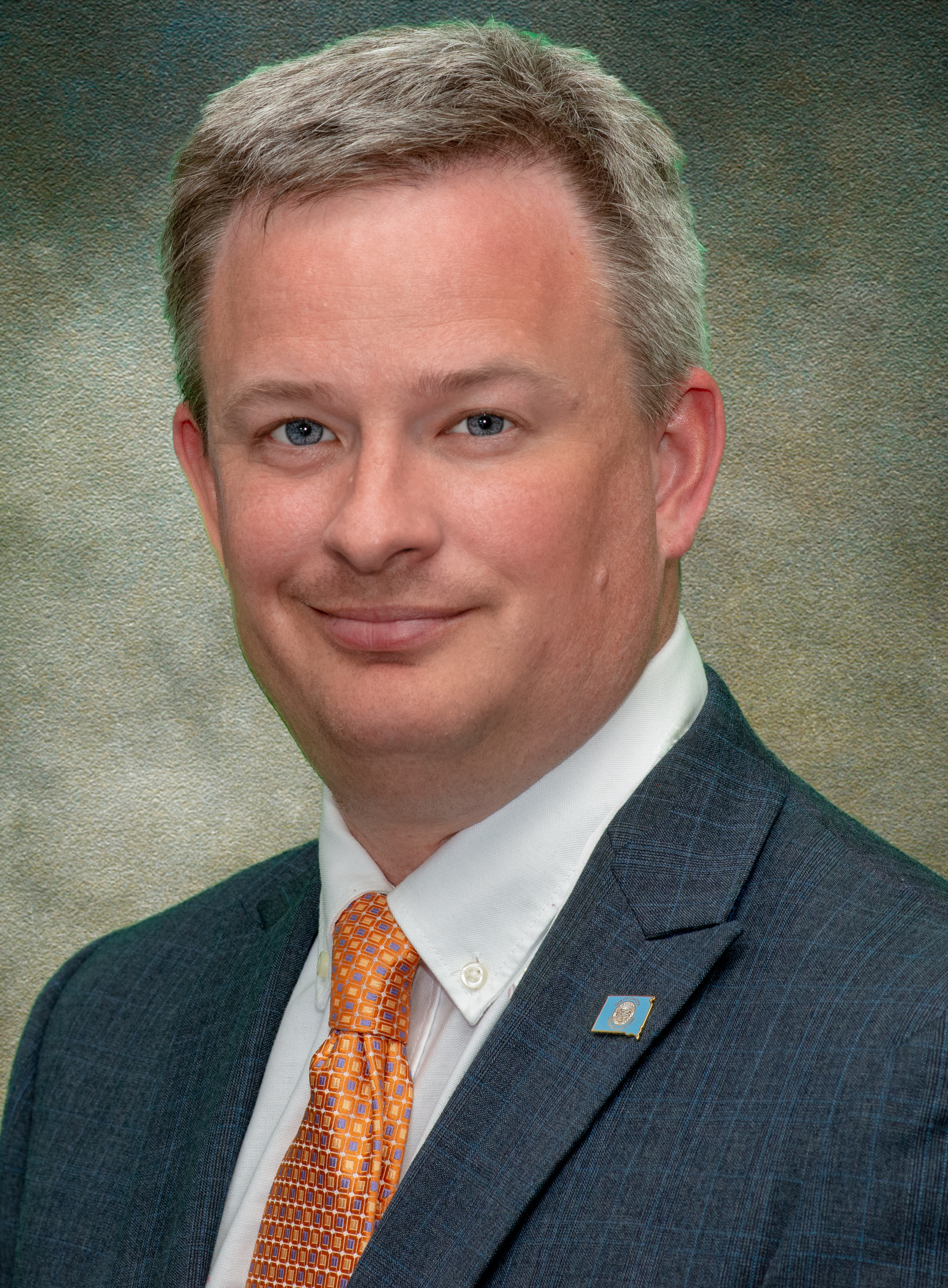

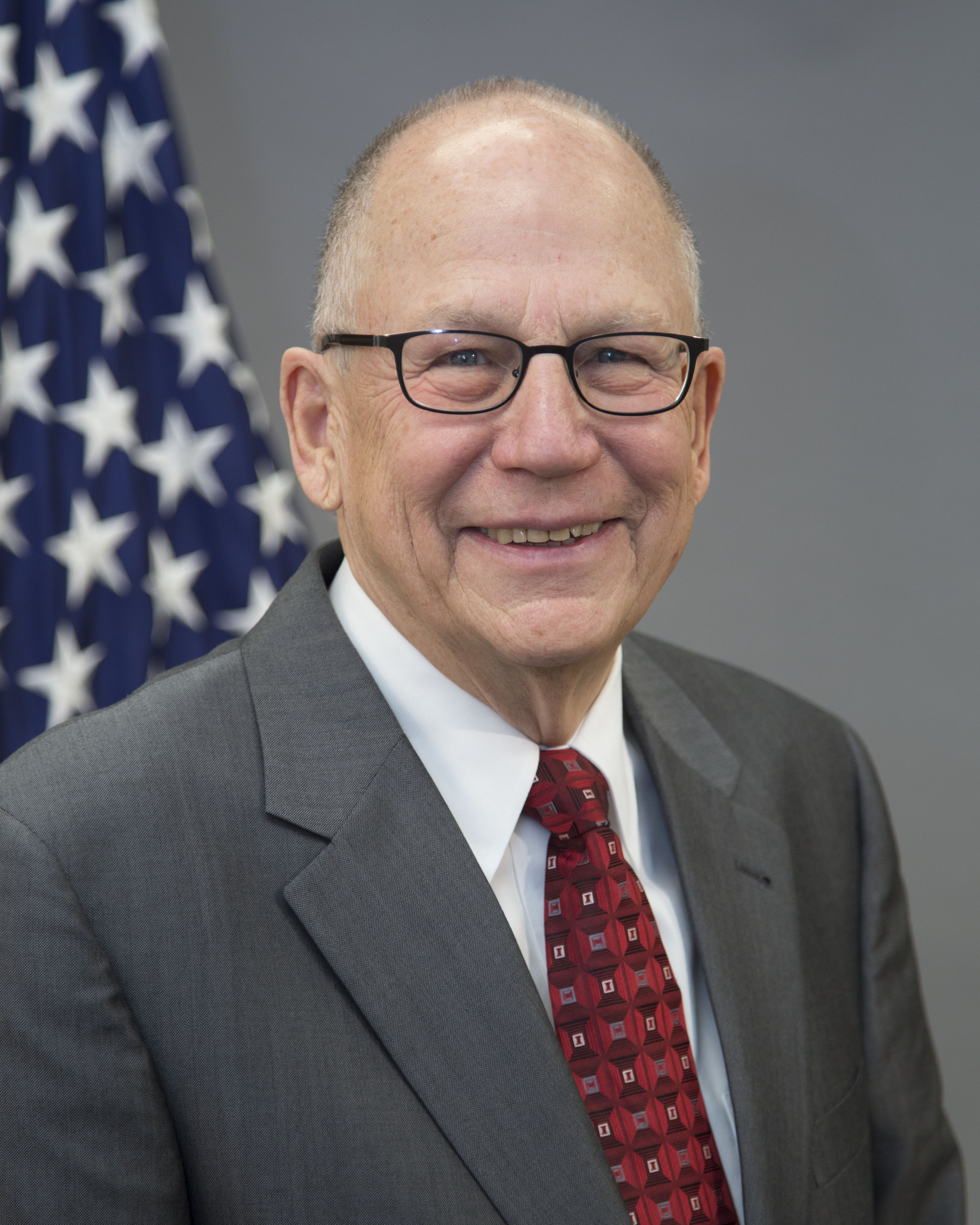
Nominee	Jason Ravnsborg	Randy Seiler
Party	Republican	Democratic
Popular vote	179,071	145,558
Percentage	55.16%	44.84%
- Ravnsborg: 50–60% 60–70% 70–80% 80–90% >90% Seiler: 50–60% 60–70% 70–80% 80–90% >90% Tie: 50%
Attorney General before election
Marty Jackley
Republican
Elected Attorney General
Jason Ravnsborg
Republican

The 2018 South Dakota Attorney General election was held on November 6, 2018. Incumbent attorney general Marty Jackley was term-limited and ran for governor of South Dakota. In June 2018, the South Dakota Republican party nominated Jason Ravnsborg for attorney general, and the Democratic party nominated Randy Seiler. Ravnsborg won the election to become the 31st attorney general of South Dakota.

== Background ==
In 2009, Republican incumbent Marty Jackley was first appointed attorney general by then-governor Mike Rounds. Jackley succeeded one-term Republican incumbent Larry Long, who opted to be appointed by Governor Mike Rounds to be a circuit court judge in Sioux Falls. Jackley was then elected in 2010 and re-elected in 2014.

== Democratic nomination ==
Former U.S. Attorney for the District of South Dakota, Randy Seiler won the nomination at the Democratic Convention.

On June 15, 2018, Seiler defeated former Oglala Lakota Attorney General Tatewin Means at the Democratic Convention held in Sioux Falls, South Dakota by an approximate 2-to-1 margin. Means made history by becoming the first indigenous woman to run for attorney general.

== Republican nomination ==
Yankton attorney Jason Ravnsborg won the South Dakota Republican nomination at its state convention.

On June 23, 2018, In the second round of voting, Ravnsborg defeated South Dakota State Senator Lance Russell of Hot Springs, South Dakota for the Republican nomination by a margin of 63% to 37% at the Republican Convention in Pierre, South Dakota.

In the first round of voting at the convention, Ravnsborg led with 47% of the vote; Russell had 27% and Lawrence County State's Attorney John Fitzgerald had 26%. Therefore, Fitzgerald was eliminated after the first round of voting and Ravnsborg and Russell would go head to head.

Chief Deputy Attorney General Charlie McGuigan withdrew from the race prior to the convention.

South Dakota Attorney General, Republican Convention election 2018, final round
Party	Candidate	%
Republican	Jason Ravnsborg	63%
Republican	Lance Russell	37%

South Dakota Attorney General, Republican Convention election 2018, first round
Party	Candidate	%
Republican	Jason Ravnsborg	47%
Republican	Lance Russell	27%
Republican	John Fitzgerald	26%

== General election ==
=== Campaign ===
Both Seiler and Ravnsborg were alumni of the University of South Dakota School of Law, ensuring that a graduate of the school would continue to hold the office, a streak that has continued since 1959.

Ravnsborg secured a number of endorsements during the election. He was endorsed by 40 county sheriffs, the Fraternal Order of Police, thirty state's attorneys, the National Rifle Association, South Dakota Right to Life, and the Family Heritage Alliance.

Ravnsborg went on to win the November general election.

=== Predictions ===
Source	Ranking	As of
Governing	Safe R	October 26, 2018

=== Results ===
2018 South Dakota Attorney General election
Party	Candidate	Votes	%
Republican	Jason Ravnsborg	179,071	55.16%
Democratic	Randy Seiler	145,558	44.84%
Total votes		324,629	100.00%
Republican hold			

==== By county ====
County	Jason Ravnsborg Republican		Randy Seiler Democratic		Margin		Total
County	#	%	#	%	#	%	Total
Aurora	702	57.40%	521	42.60%	181	14.80%	1,223
Beadle	3,042	52.85%	2,714	47.15%	328	5.70%	5,756
Bennett	552	52.47%	500	47.53%	52	4.94%	1,052
Bon Homme	1,504	57.51%	1,111	42.49%	393	15.03%	2,615
Brookings	5,698	50.79%	5,521	49.21%	177	1.58%	11,219
Brown	7,186	52.09%	6,609	47.91%	577	4.18%	13,795
Brule	1,238	61.26%	783	38.74%	455	22.51%	2,021
Buffalo	157	29.96%	367	70.04%	-210	-40.08%	524
Butte	2,665	72.24%	1,024	27.76%	1,641	44.48%	3,689
Campbell	475	65.34%	252	34.66%	223	30.67%	727
Charles Mix	1,839	53.18%	1,619	46.82%	220	6.36%	3,458
Clark	961	60.67%	623	39.33%	338	21.34%	1,584
Clay	1,675	37.63%	2,776	62.37%	-1,101	-24.74%	4,451
Codington	6,013	59.55%	4,085	40.45%	1,928	19.09%	10,098
Corson	419	38.23%	677	61.77%	-258	-23.54%	1,096
Custer	2,892	67.19%	1,412	32.81%	1,480	34.39%	4,304
Davison	3,925	56.65%	3,003	43.35%	922	13.31%	6,928
Day	1,258	48.38%	1,342	51.62%	-84	-3.23%	2,600
Deuel	1,102	58.34%	787	41.66%	315	16.68%	1,889
Dewey	490	27.50%	1,292	72.50%	-802	-45.01%	1,782
Douglas	1,116	77.34%	327	22.66%	789	54.68%	1,443
Edmunds	1,016	62.60%	607	37.40%	409	25.20%	1,623
Fall River	2,069	66.17%	1,058	33.83%	1,011	32.33%	3,127
Faulk	759	73.98%	267	26.02%	492	47.95%	1,026
Grant	1,890	62.05%	1,156	37.95%	734	24.10%	3,046
Gregory	1,239	61.46%	777	38.54%	462	22.92%	2,016
Haakon	742	80.83%	176	19.17%	566	61.66%	918
Hamlin	1,809	69.85%	781	30.15%	1,028	39.69%	2,590
Hand	1,024	64.44%	565	35.56%	459	28.89%	1,589
Hanson	979	63.74%	557	36.26%	422	27.47%	1,536
Harding	550	83.33%	110	16.67%	440	66.67%	660
Hughes	3,517	44.97%	4,304	55.03%	-787	-10.06%	7,821
Hutchinson	2,085	65.90%	1,079	34.10%	1,006	31.80%	3,164
Hyde	412	64.07%	231	35.93%	181	28.15%	643
Jackson	531	55.54%	425	44.46%	106	11.09%	956
Jerauld	475	54.79%	392	45.21%	83	9.57%	867
Jones	390	75.00%	130	25.00%	260	50.00%	520
Kingsbury	1,394	59.80%	937	40.20%	457	19.61%	2,331
Lake	2,733	54.93%	2,242	45.07%	491	9.87%	4,975
Lawrence	6,260	59.42%	4,275	40.58%	1,985	18.84%	10,535
Lincoln	13,025	56.40%	10,071	43.60%	2,954	12.79%	23,096
Lyman	780	58.65%	550	41.35%	230	17.29%	1,330
Marshall	862	46.15%	1,006	53.85%	-144	-7.71%	1,868
McCook	1,420	59.99%	947	40.01%	473	19.98%	2,367
McPherson	771	75.44%	251	24.56%	520	50.88%	1,022
Meade	6,656	67.75%	3,168	32.25%	3,488	35.50%	9,824
Mellette	346	50.96%	333	49.04%	13	1.91%	679
Miner	569	55.46%	457	44.54%	112	10.92%	1,026
Minnehaha	32,899	49.03%	34,203	50.97%	-1,304	-1.94%	67,102
Moody	1,398	51.32%	1,326	48.68%	72	2.64%	2,724
Oglala Lakota	239	8.06%	2,726	91.94%	-2,487	-83.88%	2,965
Pennington	23,559	58.61%	16,635	41.39%	6,924	17.23%	40,194
Perkins	945	73.66%	338	26.34%	607	47.31%	1,283
Potter	820	71.49%	327	28.51%	493	42.98%	1,147
Roberts	1,657	46.52%	1,905	53.48%	-248	-6.96%	3,562
Sanborn	606	61.90%	373	38.10%	233	23.80%	979
Spink	1,476	54.67%	1,224	45.33%	252	9.33%	2,700
Stanley	628	42.84%	838	57.16%	-210	-14.32%	1,466
Sully	504	62.92%	297	37.08%	207	25.84%	801
Todd	462	21.58%	1,679	78.42%	-1,217	-56.84%	2,141
Tripp	1,604	66.78%	798	33.22%	806	33.56%	2,402
Turner	2,348	63.93%	1,325	36.07%	1,023	27.85%	3,673
Union	4,144	64.05%	2,326	35.95%	1,818	28.10%	6,470
Walworth	1,380	62.76%	819	37.24%	561	25.51%	2,199
Yankton	4,921	57.12%	3,694	42.88%	1,227	14.24%	8,615
Ziebach	269	33.75%	528	66.25%	-259	-32.50%	797
Totals	179,071	55.16%	145,558	44.84%	33,513	10.32%	324,629

==== Counties that flipped from Republican to Democratic ====
- Buffalo (largest city: Fort Thompson)
- Corson (largest city: McLaughlin)
- Dewey (largest city: North Eagle Butte)
- Ziebach (largest city: Dupree)
- Roberts (largest city: Sisseton)
- Marshall (largest city: Britton)
- Day (largest city: Webster)
- Stanley (largest city: Fort Pierre)
- Hughes (largest city: Pierre)
- Minnehaha (largest city: Sioux Falls)
- Clay (largest city: Vermillion)

==== Counties that flipped from Libertarian to Democratic ====
- Oglala Lakota (largest city: Pine Ridge)
- Todd (largest city: Mission)

== See also ==
- South Dakota elections, 2018
