= Steve Hickey =

American politician (1967–2025)

Member of the South Dakota House of Representatives from the 9th district
- In office January 11, 2011 – September 1, 2015
- Preceded by: Tom Dempster
- Succeeded by: Wayne Steinhauer

Personal details
- Born: June 4, 1967 Chicago, Illinois, US
- Died: June 27, 2025 (aged 58) Soldatna, Alaska, US
- Party: Republican
- Education: Mid-America Nazarene College; North Park Theological Seminary
- Profession: Pastor
- Website: stevehickeyforstatehouse.com

Steven Andrew Hickey (June 4, 1967 – June 27, 2025) was an American pastor and politician who served three terms in the South Dakota House of Representatives representing District 9 (including part of Sioux Falls, with most of the territory to the west of that city), from 2011 to September 2015.

== Education ==
Hickey earned a BA from Mid-America Nazarene College (now MidAmerica Nazarene University), and a M.Div. from North Park Theological Seminary, and a Masters in Theological Ethics [M.ThE.] from the University of Aberdeen. He has a Ph.D. from the University of Aberdeen focusing on Leo Tolstoy's interpretation of the Sermon on the Mount.

== Career ==
Hickey was ordained by the Evangelical Covenant Church of America. He served as a youth pastor at Hillcrest Covenant Church in Prairie Village, Kansas from 1986 to 1991. He served as youth pastor and later as interim pastor at Edgebrook Covenant Church in Chicago from 1991 to 1994.

After moving to Sioux Falls, South Dakota, he became founding pastor (1994–2015) of Church at the Gate. Since 2002, he has served as chaplain for the Minnehaha County Sheriff's Office and the Sioux Falls Police Department.

Hickey became an activist statewide in supporting two ballot measures to ban abortion in South Dakota, 2008 and 2009.

Becoming increasingly active in politics, he joined the Republican Party and ran in 2010 for one of the two seats in District 9 in the state legislature He was elected to three successive terms in the state legislature from District 9, which includes part of Sioux Falls, and much more territory to the west of the city. During his tenure, he twice tried to gain repeal of use of the death penalty in South Dakota, saying that the state should be consistently pro-life. He expressed his position in an open letter to lawmakers in 2014. He also has opposed proposals to enable euthanasia, as some states have authorized.

In 2013 Hickey resisted attempts to legalize cage fighting in South Dakota by establishing a state athletic commission. He said that "cage fighting is perhaps the child porn of sports", resulting in strong opposition from the sport's enthusiasts nationwide and promoters and fighters in the industry.

In 2014–2016, Hickey joined with Steve Hildebrand, also of Sioux Falls and a former campaign manager for Barack Obama in 2008, to form 'South Dakotans for Responsible Lending.' Together they successfully led a statewide ballot initiative to cap the interest rate on payday and title loans at 36%; this change effectively has driven payday lenders out of the state.

== Elections ==
- 2010 When incumbent Republican Representative Deb Peters ran for South Dakota Senate and Democratic Representative Richard Engels left the Legislature, leaving both District 9 seats open, Hickey ran in the June 8, 2010 Republican Primary; in the five-way November 2, 2010 General election, Hickey took the first seat with 3,769 votes (26.82%) and fellow Republican nominee Bob Deelstra took the second seat, ahead of Democratic nominees Trudi Hatch and Mark Anderson, and Constitution candidate Charles Drews.
- 2012 Hickey and incumbent Republican Representative Bob Deelstra were unopposed for the June 5, 2012 Republican Primary; in the four-way November 6, 2012 General election Hickey took the first seat with 4,188 votes (27.51%) and Democratic nominee Paula Hawks took the second seat ahead of incumbent Republican Representative Deelstra and returning 2010 Democratic nominee Mark Anderson.

== Personal life ==
Hickey married Kristen Kay Olson on November 19, 1988. They had three children. In 2013 he was diagnosed with Idiopathic Pulmonary Fibrosis; he retired from active pastoral ministry and politics. Hickey moved with his wife and daughter to Old Aberdeen, Scotland. He died on June 27, 2025, in Soldatna, Alaska. https://covchurch.org/2025/08/05/steve-hickey/

== Books and publications ==
Hickey wrote several books, including Obtainable Expectations: Timely Exposition of the Sermon on the Mount (2012), and Obtainable Destiny: Timely Exposition of the Apostolic Letters (2004) and The Fall Away Factor (2013) and Momentum: God’s Ever-Increasing Kingdom (2009).
