= 2018 South Dakota elections =

- November 6, 2018

The 2018 South Dakota elections were held on November 6, 2018. All of South Dakota's executive officers were up for election as well as South Dakota's at-large seat in the United States House of Representatives.

== United States House of Representatives ==
Incumbent Republican U.S. Representative Kristi Noem did not run for re-election and instead ran for governor. Republican Dusty Johnson won the general election.

South Dakota's at-large congressional district, 2018
Party	Candidate	Votes	%	±%
Republican	Dusty Johnson	202,446	60.35%	−3.75%
Democratic	Tim Bjorkman	120,816	36.01%	+0.11%
Independent	Ron Wieczorek	7,313	2.18%	N/A
Libertarian	George D. Hendrickson	4,896	1.46%	N/A
Total votes		335,471	100.0%	N/A
Republican hold				

== Governor and Lieutenant Governor ==
Incumbent Republican governor Dennis Daugaard was term-limited and could not seek a third consecutive term. Republican Kristi Noem narrowly won the general election.

South Dakota gubernatorial election, 2018
Party	Candidate	Votes	%	±%
Republican	Kristi Noem	172,912	50.97%	−19.50%
Democratic	Billie Sutton	161,454	47.60%	+22.17%
Libertarian	Kurt Evans	4,848	1.43%	N/A
Total votes		339,214	100.00%	N/A
Republican hold				

== Attorney general ==
Incumbent Republican attorney general Marty Jackley was term-limited and could not run for a third term. Jackley unsuccessfully ran for governor. Republican Jason Ravnsborg won, becoming the next attorney general.

=== Results ===
2018 South Dakota Attorney General election
Party	Candidate	Votes	%
Republican	Jason Ravnsborg	179,071	55.16%
Democratic	Randy Seiler	145,558	44.84%
Total votes		324,629	100.0%
Republican hold			

=== Republican primary ===
Lawrence County State's Attorney John Fitzgerald, Chief Deputy Attorney General Charlie McGuigan, and attorney and 2014 U.S. Senate candidate Jason Ravnsborg ran for the Republican nomination and won.

=== Democratic primary ===
Former U.S. Attorney for the District of South Dakota, Randy Seiler won the nomination at the South Dakota Democratic Convention.

== Secretary of State ==
Incumbent Republican Secretary of State Shantel Krebs did not run for re-election and instead unsuccessfully ran for Congress. Steve Barnett ran for the Republican nomination and won. He easily won the general election.

South Dakota Secretary of State election, 2018
Party	Candidate	Votes	%	±%
Republican	Steve Barnett	211,064	65.17%	
Democratic	Alexandra Frederick	112,807	34.83%	
Total votes		323,871	100.00%	N/A
Republican hold				

== State Treasurer ==
Incumbent Republican State Treasurer Rich Sattgast was term-limited and could not run for a third term. Josh Haeder, Northeast Director for Senator Mike Rounds, ran for the Republican nomination and won. He easily won the general election.

South Dakota State Treasurer election, 2018
Party	Candidate	Votes	%	±%
Republican	Josh Haeder	195,019	62.35%	
Democratic	Aaron Matson	117,763	37.65%	
Total votes		312,782	100.00%	N/A
Republican hold				

== State Auditor ==
Incumbent Republican state auditor Steve Barnett was term-limited and could not run for a third term. Republican Rich Sattgast won the general election.

South Dakota State Auditor election, 2018
Party	Candidate	Votes	%	±%
Republican	Rich Sattgast	202,055	64.01%	
Democratic	Tom Cool	113,628	35.99%	
Total votes		315,683	100.00%	N/A
Republican hold				

== Commissioner of School and Public Lands ==
South Dakota Commissioner of School and Public Lands
Party	Candidate	Votes	%
Republican	Ryan Brunner (incumbent)	193,434	62.4
Democratic	Woody Houser	116,786	37.6
Total votes		310,220	100.0
Republican hold			

== Public Utilities Commission ==
South Dakota Public Utilities Commission
Party	Candidate	Votes	%
Republican	Kristie Fiegen (incumbent)	206,436	65.5
Democratic	Wayne Frederick	108,925	34.5
Total votes		315,361	100.0
Republican hold			
