= South Dakota's 9th legislative district =

American legislative district

South Dakota's 9th State Senate district

South Dakota's 9th legislative district is one of 35 districts in the South Dakota Legislature. Each district is represented by 1 senator and 2 representatives. In the Senate, it has been represented by Republican Brent Hoffman since 2023. In the House, it has been represented by Republicans Bethany Soye since 2021 and Kenneth Teunissen since 2023.

== Geography ==
The district is located in the eastern suburbs of Sioux Falls entirely within Minnehaha County, the state's most populous county, in southeastern South Dakota.

== Recent elections ==
South Dakota legislators are elected to two-year terms, with each permitted to serve a maximum of four consecutive terms. Elections are held every even-numbered year.

=== State senate elections ===
Year	Incumbent	Party	First elected	Result	General Election	Primary Elections
2022	Wayne Steinhauer	Republican	2018	Incumbent retired. Republican hold.	▌ ✓ Brent Hoffman (Republican) 100%	Republican: ▌ ✓ Brent Hoffman 66.8%; ▌ Mark Willadsen 33.2%
2020	Wayne Steinhauer	Republican	2018	Incumbent re-elected.	▌ ✓ Wayne Steinhauer (Republican) 58.0%; ▌ Suzanne Jones Pranger (Democratic) 42.0%	
2018	Deb Peters	Republican	2010	Incumbent retired. Republican hold.	▌ ✓ Wayne Steinhauer (Republican) 56.7%; ▌ Laura Swier Kotelman (Democratic) 43.3%	Republican: ▌ ✓ Wayne Steinhauer 66.8%; ▌ Lora Hubbel 38.5%
2016	Deb Peters	Republican	2010	Incumbent re-elected.	▌ ✓ Deb Peters (Republican) 65.4%; ▌ John Koch (Democratic) 34.6%	Republican: ▌ ✓ Deb Peters (inc.) 56.3%; ▌ Lora Hubbel 43.7%
2014	Deb Peters	Republican	2010	Incumbent re-elected.	▌ ✓ Deb Peters (Republican) 100%	
2012	Deb Peters	Republican	2010	Incumbent re-elected.	▌ ✓ Deb Peters (Republican) `00%	Republican: ▌ ✓ Deb Peters (inc.) 52.7%; ▌ Lora Hubbel 47.3%
