= Mark Vargo =

Mark Vargo may refer to:

- Mark Vargo (special effects artist)
- Mark Vargo (politician)
