= Bob Deelstra =

American politician

Member of the South Dakota House of Representatives from the 9th district
- In office January 11, 2011 – January 8, 2013
- Preceded by: Richard Engels; Deb Peters
- Succeeded by: Paula Hawks

Personal details
- Born: December 12, 1980 (age 45)
- Party: Republican

Bob Deelstra (born December 12, 1980) is an American politician who served in the South Dakota House of Representatives from the 9th district from 2011 to 2013.
