= 2014 South Dakota Attorney General election =

- November 4, 2014
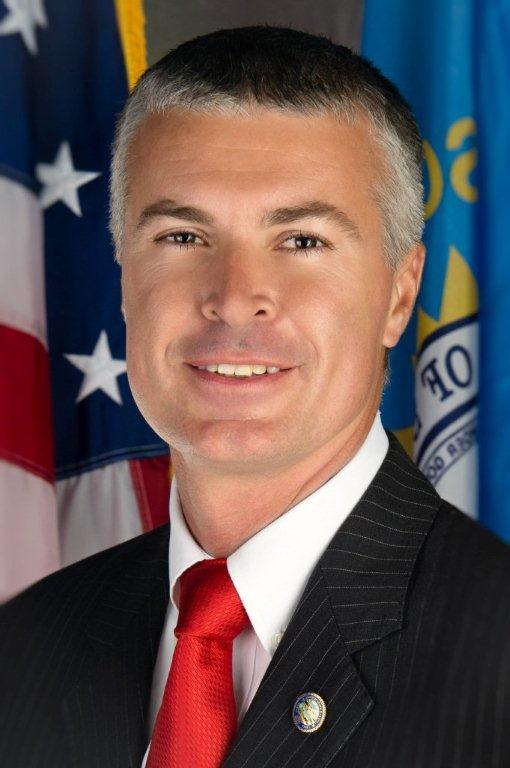

Nominee	Marty Jackley	Chad Haber
Party	Republican	Libertarian
Popular vote	179,071	45,856
Percentage	82.00%	18.00%
- County results Jackley: 50–60% 60–70% 70–80% 80–90% >90% Haber: 50–60% 60–70%
Attorney General before election
Marty Jackley
Republican
Elected Attorney General
Marty Jackley
Republican

The 2014 South Dakota Attorney General election was held on November 4, 2014, to elect the attorney general of South Dakota. Republican incumbent Marty Jackley won re-election to a second full term after first being appointed to the position in 2009. Jackley defeated Chad Haber of the Libertarian Party in a landslide. The Democratic Party did not run a candidate.

The Libertarian Party ran a negative campaign, accusing Jackley of large-scale corruption. Haber is the husband of former U.S. Senate candidate Annette Bosworth, who was, at the time, being investigated by the attorney general's office on 12 felony election law charges. A year after the election, Haber still owed over $6,000 for multiple violations of campaign finance law.

== Background ==
In 2009, Republican Marty Jackley was first appointed attorney general by then-governor Mike Rounds. Jackley succeeded one-term Republican incumbent Larry Long, who opted to be appointed by Governor Mike Rounds to be a circuit court judge in Sioux Falls. Jackley was then elected in 2010 for his first full term.

== Republican convention ==
Jackley ran unopposed for the Republican nomination at the August 2014 convention.

=== Candidates ===
==== Nominee ====
- Marty Jackley, incumbent attorney general

== Libertarian convention ==
=== Candidates ===
==== Nominee ====
- Chad Haber, healthcare worker

==== Eliminated at convention ====
- Kurt Evans, former U.S. Senate candidate (later ran for state auditor)
- Bob Newland, former Attorney General candidate

=== Results ===
2014 South Dakota Attorney General Libertarian Convention results
Candidate	Votes	Percentage
Chad Haber	15	50.00%
Kurt Evans	10	33.33%
Bob Newland	3	10.00%
None of the above	2	6.66%
Total	30	100.00%

== General election ==
=== Results ===
2014 South Dakota Attorney General election
Party	Candidate	Votes	%
Republican	Marty Jackley (incumbent)	208,848	82.00%
Libertarian	Chad Haber	45,856	18.00%
Total votes		254,704	100.00%
Republican hold			

==== By county ====
County	Marty Jackley Republican		Chad Haber Libertarian		Margin		Total
County	#	%	#	%	#	%	Total
Aurora	885	82.94%	182	17.06%	703	65.89%	1,067
Beadle	4,433	83.80%	857	16.20%	3,576	67.60%	5,290
Bennett	644	75.94%	204	24.06%	440	51.89%	848
Bon Homme	1,833	82.68%	384	17.32%	1,449	65.36%	2,217
Brookings	6,753	80.83%	1,602	19.17%	5,151	61.65%	8,355
Brown	8,561	78.06%	2,406	21.94%	6,155	56.12%	10,967
Brule	1,442	84.97%	255	15.03%	1,187	69.95%	1,697
Buffalo	243	58.70%	171	41.30%	72	17.39%	414
Butte	2,571	84.02%	489	15.98%	2,082	68.04%	3,060
Campbell	528	89.19%	64	10.81%	464	78.38%	592
Charles Mix	2,368	80.65%	568	19.35%	1,800	61.31%	2,936
Clark	1,150	85.00%	203	15.00%	947	69.99%	1,353
Clay	2,382	73.63%	853	26.37%	1,529	47.26%	3,235
Codington	7,021	83.52%	1,385	16.48%	5,636	67.05%	8,406
Corson	512	63.37%	296	36.63%	216	26.73%	808
Custer	2,848	83.45%	565	16.55%	2,283	66.89%	3,413
Davison	4,866	85.53%	823	14.47%	4,043	71.07%	5,689
Day	1,655	76.76%	501	23.24%	1,154	53.53%	2,156
Deuel	1,387	83.76%	269	16.24%	1,118	67.51%	1,656
Dewey	809	61.90%	498	38.10%	311	23.79%	1,307
Douglas	1,139	92.30%	95	7.70%	1,044	84.60%	1,234
Edmunds	1,334	85.29%	230	14.71%	1,104	70.59%	1,564
Fall River	2,169	80.57%	523	19.43%	1,646	61.14%	2,692
Faulk	714	87.29%	104	12.71%	610	74.57%	818
Grant	2,155	81.35%	494	18.65%	1,661	62.70%	2,649
Gregory	1,489	87.49%	213	12.51%	1,276	74.97%	1,702
Haakon	781	92.54%	63	7.46%	718	85.07%	844
Hamlin	1,814	86.26%	289	13.74%	1,525	72.52%	2,103
Hand	1,256	90.10%	138	9.90%	1,118	80.20%	1,394
Hanson	1,066	86.32%	169	13.68%	897	72.63%	1,235
Harding	520	89.81%	59	10.19%	461	79.62%	579
Hughes	5,952	89.13%	726	10.87%	5,226	78.26%	6,678
Hutchinson	2,356	90.48%	248	9.52%	2,108	80.95%	2,604
Hyde	510	89.63%	59	10.37%	451	79.26%	569
Jackson	659	77.44%	192	22.56%	467	54.88%	851
Jerauld	669	88.03%	91	11.97%	578	76.05%	760
Jones	420	92.11%	36	7.89%	384	84.21%	456
Kingsbury	1,628	83.49%	322	16.51%	1,306	66.97%	1,950
Lake	3,691	83.72%	718	16.28%	2,973	67.43%	4,409
Lawrence	6,694	81.79%	1,490	18.21%	5,204	63.59%	8,184
Lincoln	13,514	86.46%	2,116	13.54%	11,398	72.92%	15,630
Lyman	951	80.94%	224	19.06%	727	61.87%	1,175
Marshall	1,198	79.23%	314	20.77%	884	58.47%	1,512
McCook	1,643	86.84%	249	13.16%	1,394	73.68%	1,892
McPherson	856	88.61%	110	11.39%	746	77.23%	966
Meade	6,829	85.62%	1,147	14.38%	5,682	71.24%	7,976
Mellette	469	74.44%	161	25.56%	308	48.89%	630
Miner	681	85.88%	112	14.12%	569	71.75%	793
Minnehaha	39,817	81.51%	9,034	18.49%	30,783	63.01%	48,851
Moody	1,729	78.88%	463	21.12%	1,266	57.76%	2,192
Pennington	25,421	82.10%	5,544	17.90%	19,877	64.19%	30,965
Perkins	1,060	85.14%	185	14.86%	875	70.28%	1,245
Potter	1,009	90.74%	103	9.26%	906	81.47%	1,112
Roberts	2,179	74.67%	739	25.33%	1,440	49.35%	2,918
Sanborn	684	84.76%	123	15.24%	561	69.52%	807
Shannon	680	31.01%	1,513	68.99%	-833	-37.98%	2,193
Spink	1,928	83.18%	390	16.82%	1,538	66.35%	2,318
Stanley	1,091	88.70%	139	11.30%	952	77.40%	1,230
Sully	592	90.24%	64	9.76%	528	80.49%	656
Todd	823	45.29%	994	54.71%	-171	-9.41%	1,817
Tripp	1,845	87.48%	264	12.52%	1,581	74.96%	2,109
Turner	2,598	85.01%	458	14.99%	2,140	70.03%	3,056
Union	3,778	81.49%	858	18.51%	2,920	62.99%	4,636
Walworth	1,558	86.22%	249	13.78%	1,309	72.44%	1,807
Yankton	5,617	81.25%	1,296	18.75%	4,321	62.51%	6,913
Ziebach	391	69.33%	173	30.67%	218	38.65%	564
Totals	208,848	82.00%	45,856	18.00%	162,992	63.99%	254,704

==== Counties that flipped from Democratic to Republican ====
- Buffalo (largest city: Fort Thompson)
- Corson (largest city: McLaughlin)
- Dewey (largest city: North Eagle Butte)

==== Counties that flipped from Democratic to Libertarian ====
- Shannon (largest city: Pine Ridge)
- Todd (largest city: Mission)

== See also ==
- 2014 South Dakota elections
