= 2022 South Dakota Attorney General election =

- November 8, 2022
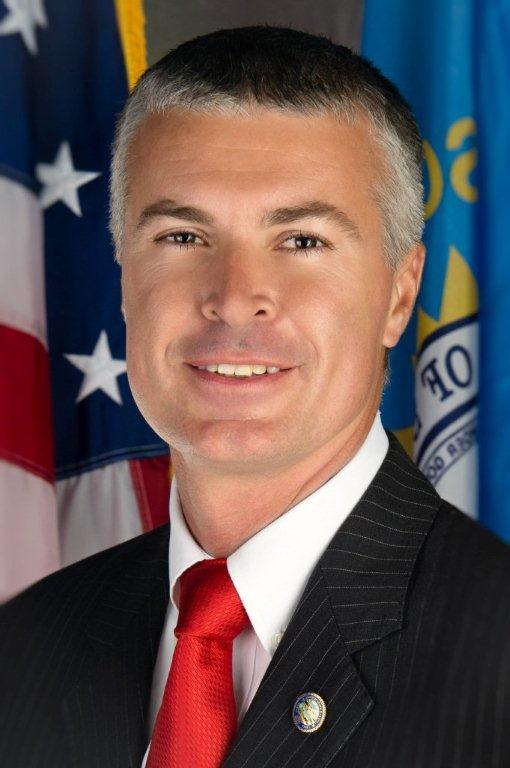
Nominee	Marty Jackley
Party	Republican
Popular vote	257,419
Percentage	100.00%
- County results Jackley: 100%
Attorney General before election
Mark Vargo
Republican
Elected Attorney General
Marty Jackley
Republican

The 2022 South Dakota Attorney General election took place on November 8, 2022, to elect the next attorney general of South Dakota. On June 21, 2022, former Republican Attorney General Jason Ravnsborg was convicted and removed from office for malfeasance of office. The State Senate further barred Ravnsborg from holding office in South Dakota. Republican Mark Vargo was appointed to fill the remainder of Ravnsborg's term and did not run for a full term.

Marty Jackley, who previously held this office from 2009 until 2019, won unopposed in the general election.

== Republican convention ==
=== Candidates ===
==== Nominated at convention ====
- Marty Jackley, former South Dakota Attorney General (2009–2019)

==== Eliminated at convention ====
- David Natvig, director of the South Dakota Division of Criminal Investigation and former Brule County State's Attorney

==== Barred from office ====
- Jason Ravnsborg, former attorney general (2019–2022)

=== Endorsements ===
Marty Jackley

Governors

- Kristi Noem, Governor of South Dakota (2019–2025) and former U.S. Representative from South Dakota's at-large congressional district (2011–2019)

=== Polling ===
Hypothetical polling

Poll source	Date(s) administered	Sample size (Note: Key: A – all adults RV – registered voters LV – likely voters V – unclear)	Margin of error	Marty Jackley	Jason Ravnsborg	Undecided
South Dakota State University	May 2–15, 2022	– (LV)	± 3.0%	61%	6%	33%

== General election ==
=== Predictions ===
Source	Ranking	As of
Sabato's Crystal Ball	Safe R	September 14, 2022
Elections Daily	Safe R	November 1, 2022

=== Results ===
2022 South Dakota Attorney General election
Party	Candidate	Votes	%
Republican	Marty Jackley	257,419	100.00%
Total votes		257,419	100.00%
Republican hold			

==== By county ====
	Marty Jackley Republican
County	Votes
Aurora	875
Beadle	4,710
Bennett	689
Bon Homme	1,963
Brookings	8,904
Brown	10,228
Brule	2,606
Buffalo	209
Butte	3,424
Campbell	576
Charles Mix	2,339
Clark	1,273
Clay	2,843
Codington	8,609
Corson	570
Custer	3,920
Davison	5,686
Day	1,907
Deuel	1,646
Dewey	893
Douglas	1,200
Edmunds	1,398
Fall River	2,864
Faulk	797
Grant	2,529
Gregory	1,635
Haakon	870
Hamlin	2,246
Hand	1,266
Hanson	1,300
Harding	609
Hughes	6,015
Hutchinson	2,364
Hyde	500
Jackson	688
Jerauld	697
Jones	405
Kingsbury	2,054
Lake	3,888
Lawrence	9,058
Lincoln	20,847
Lyman	984
Marshall	1,351
McCook	2,036
McPherson	968
Meade	9,633
Mellette	458
Miner	830
Minnehaha	50,574
Moody	1,908
Oglala Lakota	663
Pennington	32,984
Perkins	1,119
Potter	934
Roberts	2,556
Sanborn	810
Spink	2,151
Stanley	1,198
Sully	667
Todd	796
Tripp	1,876
Turner	3,121
Union	5,121
Walworth	1,691
Yankton	6,347
Ziebach	400

==== Counties that flipped from Democratic to Republican ====
- Buffalo (largest city: Fort Thompson)
- Corson (largest city: McLaughlin)
- Dewey (largest city: North Eagle Butte)
- Ziebach (largest city: Dupree)
- Roberts (largest city: Sisseton)
- Marshall (largest city: Britton)
- Day (largest city: Webster)
- Stanley (largest city: Fort Pierre)
- Hughes (largest city: Pierre)
- Minnehaha (largest city: Sioux Falls)
- Clay (largest city: Vermillion)
- Oglala Lakota (largest city: Pine Ridge)
- Todd (largest city: Mission)

County Flips: Republican Hold Flip

== See also ==
- South Dakota Attorney General
