= Brendan Johnson =

American lawyer (born 1975)

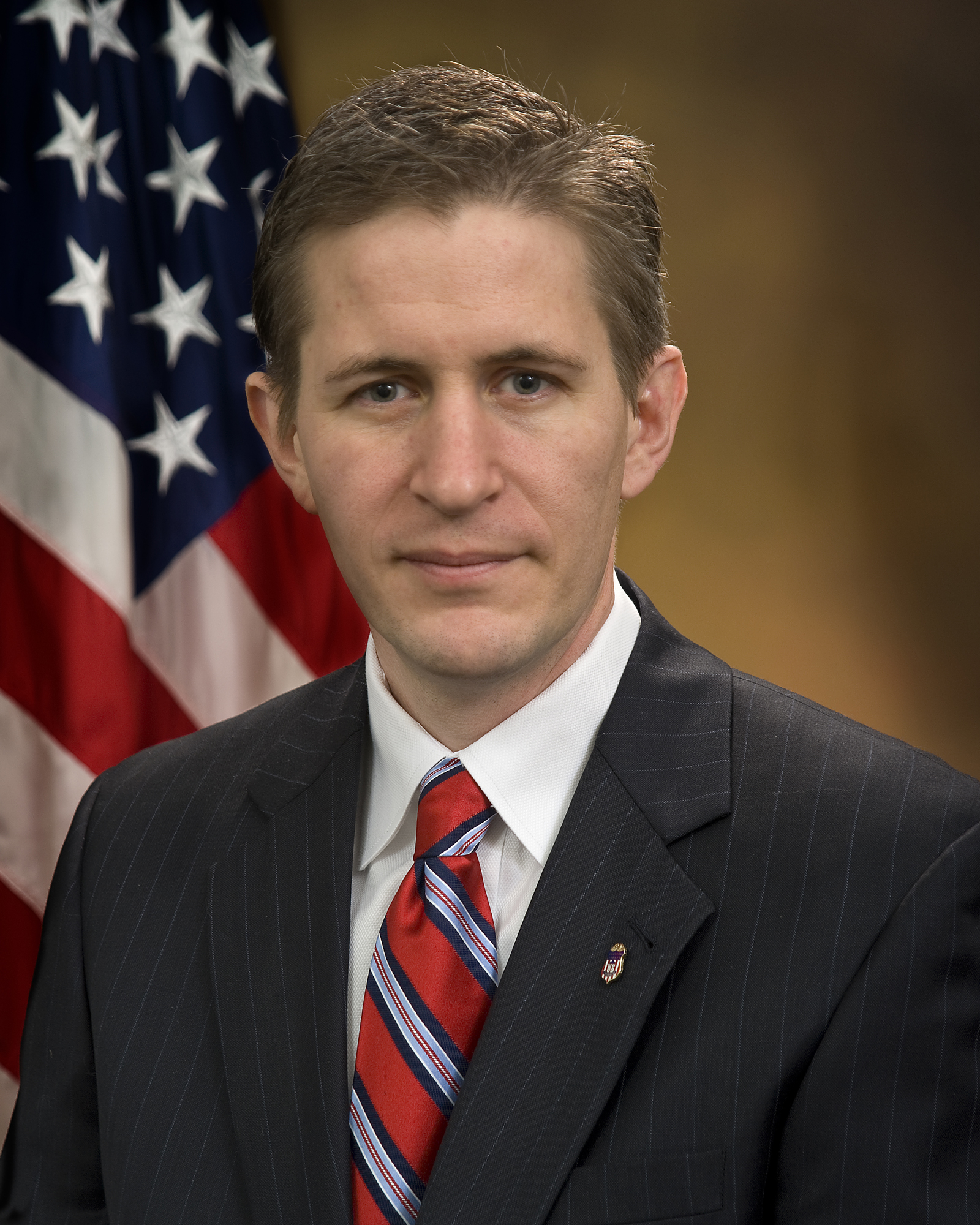

40th United States Attorney for the District of South Dakota
- In office October 15, 2009 – March 13, 2015
- President: Barack Obama
- Preceded by: Marty Jackley
- Succeeded by: Randy Seiler

Personal details
- Born: Brendan Van Johnson; June 24, 1975 (age 51) Vermillion, South Dakota, U.S.
- Party: Democratic
- Spouse: Jana Beddow
- Children: 4
- Parent: Tim Johnson (father)
- Education: University of South Dakota (BS); University of Virginia (JD)

Brendan Van Johnson (born June 24, 1975) is an American attorney who served as the 40th United States Attorney for the District of South Dakota. He is the son of former U.S. Senator Tim Johnson and currently is a partner at Robins Kaplan LLP, where he serves as the Chair of the Firm's National Business Litigation Group and Member of the Firm's executive board. In 2024, Johnson was recognized as one of America's Top 200 Lawyers for his litigation work and representation of Native American tribes.

== Early life and education ==
Johnson is the second son of United States Senator Tim Johnson, and his wife, Barbara (née Brooks) Johnson. He was born in Vermillion, South Dakota, and moved with his family to Washington, D.C. after his father was elected to Congress in 1986. In high school, he received all district honors in football and excelled as a wrestler. As a wrestler, he was known as "Magic Hips" and "Silver Lightning."

He later returned to Vermillion to attend the University of South Dakota where he was selected for the Harry S. Truman Scholarship.

== Early career ==
Johnson moved to Hill City, South Dakota, after graduating from law school to serve as a judicial law clerk to the Honorable Karen Schreier, Chief Judge of the United States District Court for the District of South Dakota. He later moved to Minnehaha County and became a prosecutor for that county. In this capacity he prosecuted a number of cases, including the case of an individual who received two life sentences without parole and 145 years in state prison for the attempted murders of two Sioux Falls Police Officers.

Johnson later became a partner in the law firm of Johnson, Heidepriem, Janklow, Abdallah and Johnson.

== U.S. Attorney for the District of South Dakota ==
Johnson was nominated by President Barack Obama as the 40th United States Attorney for the District of South Dakota and was unanimously confirmed by the United States Senate on October 15, 2009.

His nomination to be United States Attorney was supported by several prominent Republicans, including former Governor Bill Janklow, former State Attorney General Larry Long, former Sioux Falls Mayor Dave Munson, and a variety of state and local law enforcement leaders.

=== Native American issues ===
Johnson increased his office's focus on Native American issues. He worked the night shift with tribal police officers, conducted leadership training for Native American youth, and implemented a new statewide community based prosecution strategy. His focus resulted in an increase in prosecutions. Some of his office's high-profile prosecutions include a 17-person drug conspiracy in Pine Ridge known as Operation Prairie Thunder.

Johnson and his counterpart in North Dakota, former U.S. Attorney Tim Purdon, were known as the “Dakota Boys” within the Justice Department and together they focused on improving public safety in tribal communities across the country. Richard Hartunian, U.S. Attorney for the Northern District of New York, said "the efforts of the Dakota Boys were a turning point in U.S.-Tribal relations ... Brendan and Tim were the right leaders at the right time to carry out the vision of President Obama and Attorney General Holder to improve public safety in Indian Country". Purdon and Johnson joined the law firm of Robins Kaplan LLP together and now work together on behalf of tribes in private practice.

=== Human trafficking ===
As United States Attorney, Johnson oversaw the prosecution of more than 25 human trafficking cases in five years, including three life-sentences and the federal prosecution of numerous men who attempted to purchase sex from trafficking victims. He pursued the case of United States v. Jungers through the Eighth Circuit Court of Appeals, securing the critical decision that buyers of sex acts with minors are committing crimes of sex trafficking under the federal law, upping the risk of such activity by those who drive the sex trafficking markets.

In 2014, Johnson received Shared Hope International's Pathbreaker Award for determined leadership in combatting child sex trafficking: “Brendan Johnson is a force of determination, initiative and skill that should leave buyers terrified to purchase sex with a minor in South Dakota,” Shared Hope International President and Founder Linda Smith said. “By creating a threshold for buyer accountability, he sets a national precedent that, if applied, will make significant strides in reducing tolerance for purchasing sex with a minor.”

== Later legal career ==
After leaving the U.S. Attorney's office, Johnson went into private practice with Robins Kaplan LLP; he is the founding partner of the Sioux Falls branch. Robins Kaplan is the first national law firm to establish an office in South Dakota.

=== Riot Boosting Act lawsuit ===
In March, 2019, Johnson sued South Dakota Governor Kristi Noem; South Dakota Attorney General Jason Ravnsborg and Pennington County Sheriff Kevin Thom in Dakota Rural Action, Dallas Goldtooth, Indigenous Environmental Network, NDN Collective, Sierra Club and Nicholas Tilsen, in Federal District Court, Case # 5:19-cv-5046 regarding SB 189 "the Riot Boosting Act" and criminal statutes SDCL 22-10-6 & 22–10–6.1.

=== 2020 proposed constitutional amendment regarding marijuana ===
In June, 2019, Johnson submitted an initiated constitutional amendment which he entitled "An initiated amendment to the South Dakota Constitution legalizing, taxing and regulating marijuana". The proposed constitutional amendment seeks to decriminalize small amounts of marijuana, require the legislature to legalize hemp by 2022 and require the legislature to legalize medical marijuana by 2022. On September 11, 2019, the South Dakota Secretary of State approved Johnson's proposed Constitutional Amendment for circulation. On November 4, 2019, Johnson turned in over 50,000 signatures for review by the South Dakota Secretary of State with the desire to qualify for the 2020 ballot. "We are proud to have submitted petitions on behalf of over 80,000 South Dakotans who believe that voters should decide out state's marijuana and hemp laws," said Brendan Johnson, a former federal prosecutor and Democrat who is sponsor of the legalization ballot initiative. On January 6, 2019, Johnson's proposed amendment qualified for the November 2020 ballot. In the November 2020 election, Amendment A was approved with 225,260 (54.18%) voting to approve it and 190,477 (45.82%) voting against it.

On November 20, 2020, Pennington County Sheriff Kevin Thom and Colonel Rick Miller, Superintendent of the Highway Patrol sued to block Amendment A from being implemented. On February 8, 2021, Circuit Court Judge Christina Klinger ruled Amendment A unconstitutional as a violation of the single subject rule and found it to be a revision, not an amendment to the state constitution. Johnson appealed the decision to the South Dakota Supreme Court which heard oral arguments in the matter on April 28, 2021.

On November 24, 2021, the South Dakota Supreme Court struck down Amendment A by a vote of 4–1, ruling the amendment violated the single subject rule.

== Personal life ==
Brendan Johnson is married to Dr. Jana Beddow Johnson, who graduated from Mayo Medical School and was chief resident of the Harvard dermatology program. The Johnsons have four children.

== See also ==
- United States Attorney for the District of South Dakota

Legal offices
Preceded by Marty Jackley	United States Attorney for the District of South Dakota; 2009–2015	Succeeded by Randy Seiler
