= Kenneth Teunissen =

American politician

Member of the South Dakota House of Representatives from the 9th district
- Incumbent
- Assumed office January 10, 2023 Serving with Bethany Soye

Personal details
- Party: Republican

Kenneth Teunissen is an American politician. He has served as a member of the South Dakota House of Representatives from the 9th district since 2023, alongside Bethany Soye. He is a member of the Republican.
