= Wayne Steinhauer =

American businessman and politician

Member of the South Dakota Senate from the 9th district
- Incumbent
- Assumed office January 2019
- Preceded by: Deb Peters

Member of the South Dakota House of Representatives from the 9th district
- In office Appointed November 12, 2015 – January 2019
- Preceded by: Steve Hickey
- Succeeded by: Micheal Saba

Personal details
- Born: August 3, 1956 (age 69)
- Party: Republican
- Profession: Business Owner

Wayne Steinhauer (born August 3, 1956) is an American businessman and politician.

A Republican, he was appointed to the South Dakota House of Representatives in November 2015, representing District 9.
