= Ron A. Parsons Jr. =

American lawyer

Ronald A. Parsons Jr.
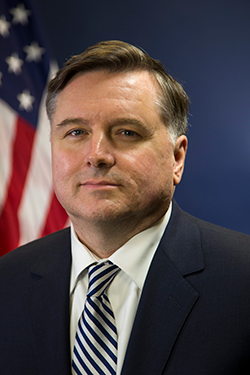

United States Attorney for the District of South Dakota
- Incumbent
- Assumed office October 14, 2025
- President: Donald Trump
- Succeeded by: Alison J. Ramsdell
- In office January 5, 2018 – February 26, 2021
- President: Donald Trump; Joe Biden
- Preceded by: Randy Seiler
- Succeeded by: Dennis R. Holmes (acting)

Personal details
- Born: Ronald Arthur Parsons; October 20, 1967 (age 58) Southfield, Michigan
- Children: 2
- Education: University of Minnesota (BA); University of South Dakota (JD)

Ronald A. Parsons Jr. is an American attorney serving as the United States attorney for the District of South Dakota since October 14, 2025. He previously served in the same position from 2018 to 2021.

== Early life and education ==
Parsons Jr. graduated with a Bachelor of Arts from the University of Minnesota in 1994 and then a Juris Doctor with Sterling honors from the University of South Dakota School of Law in 1997.

== Legal career ==
Following law school, Parsons worked as a law clerk for Judge Roger Leland Wollman of the United States Court of Appeals for the Eighth Circuit. He then went into private practice at Johnson, Janklow, Abdallah, Reiter and Parsons, LLP in Sioux Falls, South Dakota.

After serving his first term as U.S. attorney, Parsons went to work for Sioux Falls law firm Johnson Abdallah Janklow & Reiter LLP.

== United States attorney ==
=== First term ===
He was nominated by President Donald Trump on July 27, 2017, to be the United States Attorney for the District of South Dakota. He was confirmed by the United States Senate on December 20, 2017. He was sworn into office on January 5, 2018.

On February 8, 2021, he along with 55 other Trump-era attorneys were asked to resign. He submitted his resignation on February 22, effective February 26.

=== Second term ===
On April 1, 2025, Parsons was again nominated to serve as U.S. attorney for the District of South Dakota. He was confirmed by the U.S. Senate on October 7, 2025.

== See also ==
- United States Attorney for the District of South Dakota
- University of South Dakota School of Law

Legal offices
Preceded by Randy Seiler	42nd United States Attorney for the District of South Dakota; 2018–2021	Succeeded by Dennis R. Holmes; Acting
