= Tom Dempster =

American politician

Member of the South Dakota Senate from the 9th district
- In office 2003–2011
- Preceded by: Dennis Daugaard
- Succeeded by: Steve Hickey

Personal details
- Born: February 9, 1949 (age 77)
- Party: Republican; Independent
- Spouse: Patti
- Children: three
- Education: University of South Dakota
- Profession: Financial Advisor

Thomas A. Dempster (born February 9, 1949) is an American politician. He served in the South Dakota Senate from 2003 to 2011.
