= Terry L. Pechota =

American politician

Terry Pechota

32nd United States Attorney for the District of South Dakota
- In office 1979–1981
- President: Jimmy Carter
- Preceded by: Robert D. Hiaring

Personal details
- Born: February 26, 1947 (age 79) Colome, South Dakota
- Party: Democratic
- Spouse: Anita Ramerowski
- Education: University of Iowa College of Law, (J.D.)
- Profession: Attorney

Terry Pechota (born February 26, 1947) is an American attorney who was the 32nd United States Attorney for the District of South Dakota.

== United States Attorney ==
He was nominated by President Jimmy Carter to be the 32nd United States Attorney for the District of South Dakota. He was confirmed by the United States Senate. He was the first Sioux Indian to be named a U.S. Attorney. He handled several landmark cases, including the Black Hills of South Dakota case for the Rosebud Sioux in regards to the 1868 treaty. Pechota stated "The consensus is, the tribes want this land back." He stepped down from the position in 1981 and accepted a job as counsel for the Native American Rights Fund in Boulder, Colorado. He returned to South Dakota the following year.

== Personal life ==
Pechota was born and raised in Colome, South Dakota, and is of Rosebud Sioux and Czechoslovak descent.

His wife, Anita Ramerowski, was also a lawyer.

== See also ==
- United States Attorney for the District of South Dakota

Legal offices
Preceded by Robert D. Hiaring	42nd United States Attorney for the District of South Dakota; 1979-1981	Succeeded by Jeffrey L. Viken
