= Paula Hawks =

American politician (born 1975)

Chair of the South Dakota Democratic Party
- In office March 23, 2019 – October 23, 2019
- Preceded by: Ann Tornberg
- Succeeded by: Randy Seiler

Member of the South Dakota House of Representatives from the 9th district
- In office January 11, 2013 – January 10, 2017
- Preceded by: Bob Deelstra
- Succeeded by: Michael Clark

Personal details
- Born: September 11, 1975 (age 50) Sioux Falls, South Dakota, U.S.
- Party: Democratic
- Education: South Dakota State University (BS)

Paula Hawks (born September 11, 1975) is an American politician and a former Democratic member of the South Dakota House of Representatives representing District 9 from January 11, 2013 to January 10, 2017. Hawks grew up on a farm near Flandreau, South Dakota. Hawks is a bank training specialist and a former high school science teacher. She has three children with her husband, Steve.

== Elections ==
- 2012 To challenge District 9 incumbent Republican Representatives Bob Deelstra and Steve Hickey, Holly Boltjes-Johnson ran in the June 5, 2012 Democratic primary but withdrew prior to the November 6, 2012 general election; Hawks replaced Boltjes-Johnson for the four-way general election, where incumbent Republican Representative Hickey took the first seat and Hawks took the second seat with 3,965 votes (26.04%) ahead of incumbent Republican Representative Deelstra and fellow Democratic nominee Mark Anderson, who had run for the seat in 2010.
- 2016 To challenge incumbent U.S. Congresswoman Kristi Noem. In the 2016 election cycle, Hawks challenged sitting Republican Congresswoman Kristi Noem for South Dakota's lone seat in the United States House of Representatives. Noem criticized Hawks for her support of former Secretary of State Hillary Clinton, while Hawks criticized Noem for supporting Donald J. Trump. In a live televised debate, Hawks shared her experience of being a survivor of sexual assault and how she could not understand supporting Trump after all of his comments about women and allegations of assaulting women. Hawks also criticized Noem's decision to give up South Dakota's longtime seat on the House Agriculture Committee and instead to take a seat on the House Ways and Means Committee. In the November election Congresswoman Noem defeated Hawks.

== Chair of the South Dakota Democratic Party ==
On March 23, 2019, Hawks was elected party chair.

On October 23, 2019, Hawks (and Executive Director Stacey Burnette) resigned amid party financial struggles that showed approximately $47,000.00 in debt.

Party political offices
Preceded by Ann Tornberg	Chair of the South Dakota Democratic Party; 2019	Succeeded by Randy Seiler
