= Kooper Caraway =

Kooper Caraway is an American activist and labor leader. He was the youngest elected AFL-CIO central labor council president in the United States at the age of 27. He is currently the executive director of the Colorado Education Association.

== Life and career ==
Caraway was born in a small town in the US state of Alabama but he lived in various Southern states throughout his youth. Many of his older family members were active union members.

After high school, Caraway worked as a community organizer in Dallas, Texas where he fought against police brutality and joined the labor movement. He relocated to South Dakota in 2017 and served as a labor representative and organizer for AFSCME Council 65. In January 2018, he was elected the president of the Sioux Falls AFL-CIO central labor council, becoming the youngest person ever to do so at 27 years old. In 2020, he became the President of the South Dakota Federation of Labor and, at 29 years old, was the youngest AFL-CIO state president. Caraway left the organization in 2023. Since 2024, he has worked as the executive director of the Colorado Education Association.

Caraway lives in Denver, Colorado with his partner and two children.
