= Mark Vargo (politician) =

American lawyer and politician

32nd Attorney General of South Dakota
- In office June 28, 2022 – January 3, 2023
- Governor: Kristi Noem
- Preceded by: Jason Ravnsborg
- Succeeded by: Marty Jackley

Personal details
- Born: Mark Alexander Vargo; July 29, 1963 (age 62); Stuttgart, West Germany (now Germany)
- Political party: Republican
- Spouse: Barbara Melber (1988–present)
- Children: 3
- Education: Princeton University (BA); Georgetown University (JD)

Mark Alexander Vargo (born July 29, 1963) is an American lawyer and politician who served as the 32nd Attorney General of South Dakota. In June 2022, he was appointed by Governor Kristi Noem to fill the vacancy created by Jason Ravnsborg's impeachment and removal from office. He previously served as the State's Attorney of Pennington County, South Dakota, having left the position in April 2023.

== Early life ==
Vargo was born in Stuttgart, West Germany, while his father was serving in the United States Army. He is the son of college professor Albert James Vargo and nurse Geraldine Jean (Klekotka) Vargo and was raised in West Germany, Michigan, and Kansas. He is a 1981 graduate of Kapaun Mt. Carmel Catholic High School in Wichita.

In 1985, Vargo graduated from Princeton University with a Bachelor of Arts degree. While attending Princeton, he completed a 1983 summer internship in the Washington, D.C. office of U.S. Senator Bob Dole. In 1988, he graduated from Georgetown University Law Center with a Juris Doctor degree. Except for Charles McGuigan, who acted as attorney general for two months in 2022, Vargo is the first South Dakota Attorney General since 1959 who did not attend the University of South Dakota School of Law.

== Career ==
After graduating law school, Vargo was an assistant state's attorney for Miami-Dade County, Florida. After moving to South Dakota in 1992, he was an assistant state's attorney for Pennington County, and an assistant United States attorney for South Dakota. In addition, he taught courses as an adjunct professor at National American University and Western Dakota Technical Institute.

Vargo became the Pennington County State's Attorney in 2013. In 2015, he was named South Dakota Prosecutor of the Year.

Vargo was the lead prosecutor in the South Dakota Senate impeachment trial of former Attorney General Jason Ravnsborg, after Ravnsborg fatally struck a pedestrian while driving.

South Dakota Governor Kristi Noem appointed Vargo as the state's 32nd Attorney General on June 28, 2022, filling the vacancy left due to Ravnsborg's conviction. Vargo stated that he planned to serve only the remaining months of Ravnsborg's before returning to his position as the State's Attorney for Pennington County. The Republican Party had already nominated former Attorney General Marty Jackley for the 2022 South Dakota Attorney General election, and Vargo pledged to support Jackley's campaign.

== Family ==
In September 1988, Vargo married Barbara Melber of St. Lawrence, South Dakota. They are the parents of three sons.

Legal offices
Preceded by Charlie McGuigan; Acting	Attorney General of South Dakota; 2022–2023	Succeeded by Marty Jackley
