= 2014 South Dakota elections =

- November 4, 2014

A general election was held in the U.S. state of South Dakota on November 4, 2014. All of South Dakota's executive officers were up for election as well as a United States Senate seat and South Dakota's at-large seat in the United States House of Representatives. Primary elections were held on June 3, 2014.

== Governor ==
2014 South Dakota gubernatorial election
Party	Candidate	Votes	%	±%
Republican	Dennis Daugaard (incumbent)	195,477	70.47%	+8.96%
Democratic	Susan Wismer	70,549	25.43%	−13.06%
Independent	Michael J. Myers	11,377	4.10%	N/A
Total votes		277,403	100.0%	N/A
Republican hold				

== Attorney General ==
2014 South Dakota Attorney General election
Party	Candidate	Votes	%
Republican	Marty Jackley (incumbent)	208,848	82.00%
Libertarian	Chad Haber	45,856	18.00%
Total votes		254,704	100.00%

== Secretary of State ==
Incumbent Republican Secretary of State Jason Gant decided to retire rather than run for re-election to a second term in office.

2014 South Dakota Secretary of State election
Party	Candidate	Votes	%
Republican	Shantel Krebs	155,647	60.23
Democratic	Angelia Schultz	84,181	32.58
Constitution	Lori Stacey	10,258	3.97
Libertarian	Emmett Reistroffer	8,328	3.22
Total votes		258,414	100

== State Treasurer ==
Incumbent Republican State Treasurer Richard Sattgast ran for re-election to a second term in office.

2014 South Dakota State Treasurer election
Party	Candidate	Votes	%
Republican	Rich Sattgast (incumbent)	155,758	61.18
Democratic	Denny Pierson	85,202	33.47
Libertarian	Ken Santema	13,615	5.35
Total votes		254,575	100

== State Auditor ==
Incumbent Republican State Auditor Steve Barnett ran for re-election to a second term in office. The Democratic Party ran no candidate for this office, which left Kurt Evans of the Libertarian Party to be Barnett's only challenger.

2014 South Dakota State Auditor election
Party	Candidate	Votes	%
Republican	Steve Barnett (incumbent)	191,755	79.95
Libertarian	Kurt Evans	48,103	20.05
Total votes		239,858	100

== Commissioner of School and Public Lands ==
Incumbent Republican Commissioner of School and Public Lands Vern Larson, who was appointed to the office in August 2013 after Commissioner Jarrod Johnson resigned, did not run for election, as per the terms of his appointment.

2014 South Dakota Commissioner of School and Public Lands election
Party	Candidate	Votes	%
Republican	Ryan Brunner	174,810	76.45
Libertarian	John English	53,836	23.55
Total votes		228,646	100

== Public Utilities Commission ==
Incumbent Republican Public Utilities Commission Chairman Gary Hanson ran for re-election to a third six-year term in office.

2014 South Dakota Public Utilities Commissioner election
Party	Candidate	Votes	%
Republican	Gary Hanson (incumbent)	167,726	65.73
Democratic	David Allen	74,824	29.32
Constitution	Wayne Schmidt	12,642	4.95
Total votes		255,192	100
