= Randy Seiler =

American lawyer (1946–2023)

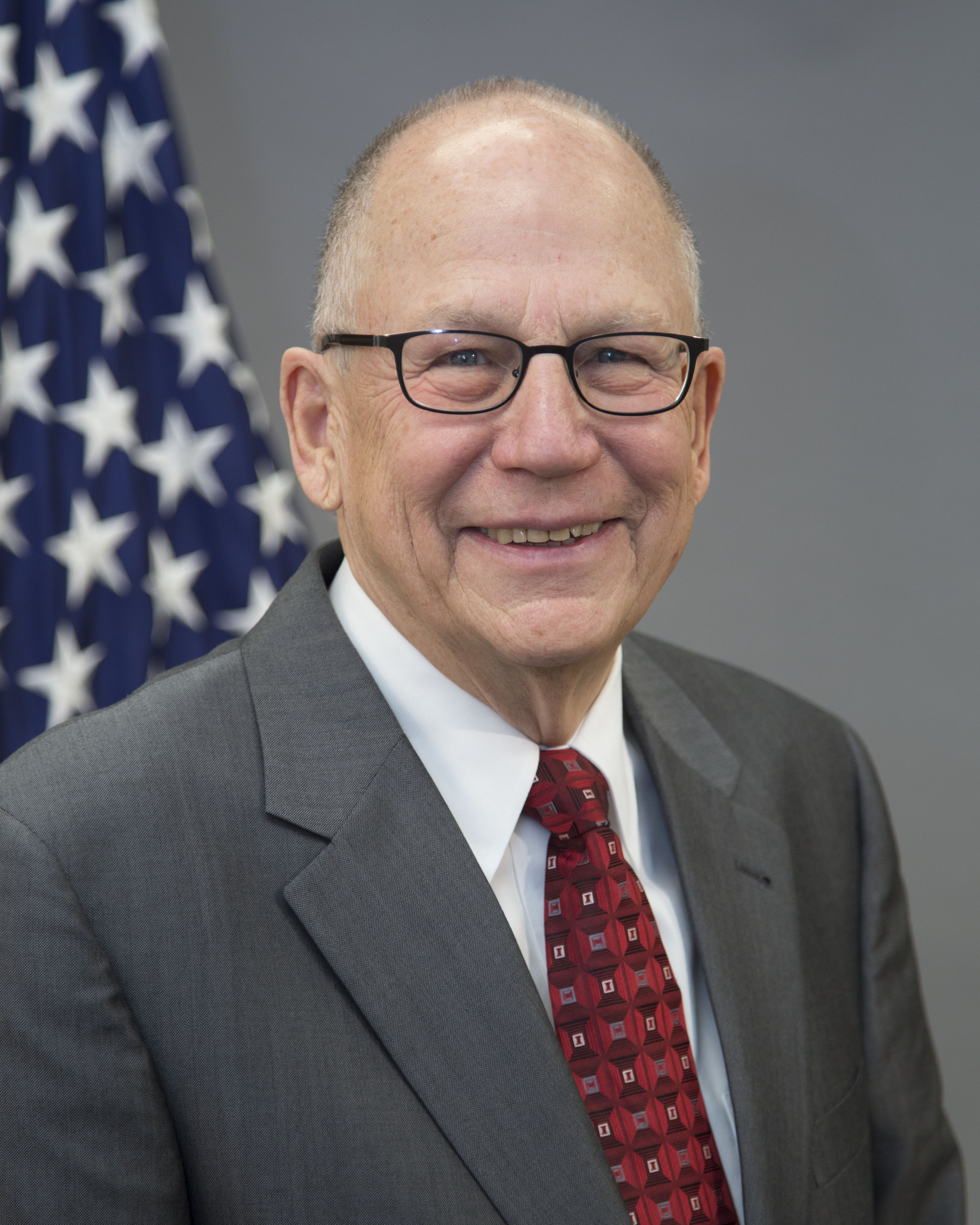

Chair of the South Dakota Democratic Party
- In office October 23, 2019 – April 17, 2023; Acting: October 23, 2019 – December 5, 2019
- Preceded by: Paula Hawks
- Succeeded by: Jennifer Slaight-Hansen

41st United States Attorney for the District of South Dakota
- In office March 13, 2015 – December 20, 2017; Acting: March 13, 2015 – October 8, 2015
- President: Barack Obama; Donald Trump
- Preceded by: Brendan Johnson
- Succeeded by: Ron A. Parsons Jr.

Personal details
- Born: Randolph John Seiler; July 1, 1946 Herreid, South Dakota, U.S.
- Died: April 17, 2023 (aged 76) Sioux Falls, South Dakota, U.S.
- Party: Democratic
- Spouse: Wanda Seiler
- Education: South Dakota State University; University of Nebraska, Omaha (BA); University of South Dakota (JD)

Randolph John Seiler (July 1, 1946 – April 17, 2023) was an American attorney and veteran who was the chair of the Democratic Party of South Dakota from 2019 until his death in 2023. He previously served as the 41st United States Attorney for the District of South Dakota from 2015 to 2017. Seiler had been the Deputy United States Attorney for the District of South Dakota.

== Early life, education, and military career ==
Seiler was raised in Herreid, South Dakota, a small town near the North Dakota border. Seiler attended South Dakota State University, but did not graduate. Seiler spent four years in the United States Air Force, serving a tour of duty in Vietnam and earning the Air Force Commendation Medal for meritorious service. He returned to the United States and graduated cum laude with a Bachelor of Science in Criminal Justice from the University of Nebraska Omaha.

Seiler was appointed by then-Governor Dick Kneip to serve as the director of the South Dakota Division of Law Enforcement Assistance. During the last two of his four years in that position, he pursued a Master of Arts degree with an emphasis in Public Administration before devoting himself full-time to the University of South Dakota School of Law graduating in 1980.

As a law student, he served a year as editor-in-chief of the South Dakota Law Review before graduating with Sterling Honors and a recipient of the Gavel Award. He then served as a judicial law clerk for United States District Court for the District of South Dakota in Sioux Falls, South Dakota. He did not sit for the bar exam as he was admitted to the South Dakota bar via diploma privilege.

== Legal career ==
Seiler went into private practice in Mobridge. Practicing law in a rural South Dakota community adjacent to two Indian reservations included work in state and federal court as well as the tribal courts of the Cheyenne River Sioux and the Standing Rock Sioux tribes. During that time, he also served as the Campbell County Deputy States Attorney and Special Judge for the Cheyenne River Sioux Tribe.

After 13 years in private practice, Seiler began his distinguished tenure as Assistant United States Attorney for the District of South Dakota, representing the United States in the prosecution of federal felony criminal law violations including murder, rape, child sexual abuse, robbery, domestic violence, aggravated assault, civil rights, public corruption, white collar crime, and other major offenses. Seiler was the lead counsel on more than 70 federal felony jury trials and more than 500 criminal cases.

== United States Attorney nomination ==
Before his U.S. Attorney nomination, Seiler became the First Assistant United States Attorney for the District of South Dakota in 2009. He was responsible for the day-to-day management and operations of the United States Attorney's Office. He was the supervisor of the United States Attorney's branch office in Pierre and directly involved in all prosecutorial matters and decision-making. He also served as Tribal Liaison during this time, consulting and coordinating with tribal communities, victim advocates, and Tribal Justice officials and leaders to address any issues in the prosecution of major crimes in Indian Country.

On March 12, 2015, Seiler was nominated by then President Barack Obama to serve as the United States Attorney for the District of South Dakota. However, because there were no U.S. Senate confirmation hearings held by the nomination deadline, by law the Chief Judge of the United States District Court for the District of South Dakota can appoint someone to fill the vacancy, which Jeffrey L. Viken did by appointing Seiler on October 8, 2015. After his appointment, Seiler received bi-partisan support with Attorney General of South Dakota Marty Jackley saying, "I believe South Dakota is very fortunate to have a United States attorney with Randy’s experience, his respect and his ability to lead the U.S. attorney’s office with its important work."

=== Native American issues ===
Seiler had a focus to strengthen law enforcement relations between Seiler's office and tribal governments. "The murder rate on Pine Ridge was among the worst in the nation in 2016, but today we are making progress." Seiler also took "a more proactive and aggressive stance" in 2017 by establishing “Walk-In Wednesday,” a program that opened an office in Pine Ridge staffed once a week with a federal prosecutor. Designed to allow citizens to more easily communicate with the office concerning crime on the reservation, inquiries about existing cases, or to obtain any information which might be sought by residents. Seiler was quoted in December 2017 as saying the program had led to half a dozen new referrals and investigations. He also believed it had made a serious improvement to relations between the U.S. Attorney's office and tribal governments. “I think it’s the best it’s ever been,” Seiler said. “I do believe there is a new sense and new generation of leadership on Pine Ridge.”

Seiler applied for and received federal funding from the U.S. Attorney General's office, allowing the creation of Civil Rights section of the South Dakota U.S. Attorney's office.

Despite being a Democrat, Seiler was not asked to resign by the incoming Trump administration when it requested 46 other U.S. attorneys to resign. Despite being one of the United States Attorneys to not be asked to step down, Seiler, aged 71 at the time, announced his retirement as the United States Attorney for the District of South Dakota in December 2017, and was succeeded by Ron A. Parsons Jr.

After his federal service ended, Seiler's served as interim state's attorney for Hughes County.

== 2018 Attorney General of South Dakota election ==
2018 Attorney General Election Map by County; Ravnsborg=Red; Seiler=Blue

Randy ran for South Dakota Attorney General and was the Democratic Party nominee. He said his main priority as Attorney General would be in fighting methamphetamine abuse in South Dakota. Seiler said there's "no better training ground" to become state attorney general than his experience in the U.S. attorney's office. Noted South Dakota politico and Argus Leader investigative reporter Jonathan Ellis called Seiler "arguably the most experienced candidate in the race for state attorney general" before Seiler had even officially declared his candidacy. Seiler lost the general election to Jason Ravnsborg.

2018 South Dakota Attorney General election
Party	Candidate	Votes	%	±%
Republican	Jason Ravnsborg	179,071	55.16%	−5.07%
Democratic	Randy Seiler	145,558	44.84%	+12.26%
Total votes		324,629	100.0%	N/A
Republican hold				

== Chair of the South Dakota Democratic Party ==
On March 23, 2019, Seiler was elected Vice Chair of the South Dakota Democratic Party after former State Rep. Paula Hawks was elected party chair.

On October 23, 2019, Seiler became the chair of the South Dakota Democratic party as Hawks (and Executive Director Stacey Burnette) resigned amid party financial struggles that showed approximately $47,000.00 in debt. He held the position until his death in 2023.

== Personal life and death ==
Seiler served three terms in the Mobridge school board and was a member of the Fort Pierre city council. He and his wife, Wanda, have four grown children and two grandchildren.

On April 14, 2023, Seiler suffered a heart attack while jogging in Pierre. He died at a Sioux Falls hospital on April 17, at the age of 76.

Legal offices
Preceded by Brendan Johnson	United States Attorney for the District of South Dakota; 2015–2017	Succeeded by Ron A. Parsons Jr.
Party political offices
Preceded by Paula Hawks	Chair of the South Dakota Democratic Party; 2019–2023	Succeeded by Jennifer Slaight-Hansen
