= United States Attorney for the District of South Dakota =

Department of Justice U.S. Attorney for the District of South Dakota
- Seal of the United States Department of Justice

Department overview
- Department executive: Ron A. Parsons Jr., United States Attorney
- Website: www.justice.gov/usao-sd

The United States Attorney for the District of South Dakota is responsible for representing the federal government in the United States District Court for the District of South Dakota. By statute, the U.S. attorney is responsible for prosecuting both federal crimes and all serious crimes committed by adults in the District of South Dakota. Therefore, the U.S. attorney for the South Dakota serves as both the federal prosecutor (as in the other 92 U.S. attorneys' offices) and as the local district attorney. As of October 14, 2025 the United States attorney is Ron A. Parsons Jr..

== List of U.S. attorneys for the District of South Dakota ==
No.	U.S. Attorney	Term of office	Law school	President
23	S. Wesley Clark	1921–1926	Read law under Thomas Sterling	Warren G. Harding
24	Olaf Eiden	1926–1934	University of Nebraska College of Law	Calvin Coolidge
25	George Philip Jr.	1934–1947	University of Michigan Law School	Franklin D. Roosevelt
26	Leo P. Flynn	1947–1953	University of South Dakota School of Law	Harry S. Truman
27	Clinton G. Richards	1953–1961	University of South Dakota School of Law	Dwight D. Eisenhower
28	Harold C. Doyle	1961–1969	University of South Dakota School of Law	John F. Kennedy
29	William F. Clayton	1969–1977	University of South Dakota School of Law	Richard Nixon
30	David V. Vrooman	1977–1978	University of South Dakota School of Law	Jimmy Carter
31	Robert D. Hiaring	1978–1979	University of South Dakota School of Law	Jimmy Carter
32	Terry L. Pechota	1979–1981	University of Iowa College of Law	Jimmy Carter
33	Jeffrey L. Viken	1981	University of South Dakota School of Law	Jimmy Carter
34	Philip N. Hogen	1981–1991	University of South Dakota School of Law	Ronald Reagan
35*	Kevin Schieffer (not confirmed by senate)	1991–1993	Georgetown Law Center	George H. W. Bush
35	Ted McBride	1993	University of South Dakota School of Law	Bill Clinton
36	Karen Schreier	1993–1999	St. Louis University School of Law	Bill Clinton
37	Ted McBride	1999–2001	University of South Dakota School of Law	Bill Clinton
38	James E. McMahon	2002–2005	University of South Dakota School of Law	George W. Bush
38*	Steven K. Mullins (recess appointment)	2006	University of Oklahoma School of Law	George W. Bush
39	Marty Jackley	2006–2009	University of South Dakota School of Law	George W. Bush
40	Brendan Johnson	2009–2015	University of Virginia School of Law	Barack Obama
41	Randy Seiler	2015–2017	University of South Dakota School of Law	Barack Obama
42	Ron A. Parsons Jr.	2018–2021; 2025-Present	University of South Dakota School of Law	Donald Trump

== See also ==
- University of South Dakota School of Law
- Attorney General of South Dakota
- South Dakota Supreme Court
