= Deb Peters =

American politician (born 1974)

Member of the South Dakota Senate from the 9th district
- In office January 11, 2011 – January 4, 2019
- Preceded by: Tom Dempster

President of the National Conference of State Legislatures
- In office 2017–2018
- Preceded by: Dan Blue
- Succeeded by: Toi Hutchinson

Member of the South Dakota House of Representatives from the 9th district
- In office January 2005 – January 11, 2011 Serving with Elaine Roberts (2005–2007); Richard Engels (2007–2011)
- Preceded by: Daryl Christensen

Personal details
- Born: October 11, 1974 (age 51) Sioux Falls, South Dakota
- Party: Republican
- Education: University of South Dakota
- Website: debpeters.com

Deb M. Peters (born October 11, 1974 in Sioux Falls, South Dakota) is an American politician who served as a Republican member of the South Dakota Senate from January 11, 2011 to January 2019. Peters served consecutively in the South Dakota Legislature from January 2005 until January 11, 2011 in the South Dakota House of Representatives District 9 seat.

In August 2017, Peters was elected to be the 45th president of the National Conference of State Legislatures. Peters resigned from the Senate on January 4, 2019 to serve in the South Dakota House of Representatives. She never took office, and was replaced by Rhonda Milstead.

== Education ==
Peters earned her BS degrees in accounting and business administration from the University of South Dakota.

== Elections ==
- 2004 To challenge House District 9 incumbent Democratic Representative Richard Engels, Peters and incumbent Republican Representative Daryl Christensen were unopposed for the June 1, 2004 Republican Primary; in the four-way November 2, 2004 General election Peters took the first seat by 16 votes with 4,329 votes (26.42%) and Democratic nominee Elaine Roberts took the second seat ahead of incumbent Democratic Representative Engels and Republican Representative Christensen.
- 2006 Peters ran in the June 6, 2006 Republican Primary and won the four-way November 7, 2006 General election she took the first seat with 3,699 votes (25.99%) and Democratic former Representative Engels took the second seat ahead of incumbent Democratic Representative Roberts and Republican nominee Katy Dressen.
- 2008 Peters ran in the June 3, 2008 Republican Primary, and won the four-way November 4, 2008 General election where she took the first seat with 5,115 votes (30.14%) and incumbent Democratic Representative Engels took the second seat ahead of Republican nominee Tom Sutton and Democratic nominee Marlyn Beebe.
- 2010 When Senate District 9 incumbent Independent Senator Tom Dempster was term limited and left the Legislature, Peters was unopposed for the June 8, 2010 Republican Primary and won the November 2, 2010 General election with 5,119 votes (63.39%) against Democratic nominee Rob Wilson.
- 2012 Peters was challenged in the June 5, 2012 Republican primary by State Representative Lora Hubbel and won by 42 votes out of 405 votes cast (52.73%). Peters was unopposed for the November 6, 2012 General election, winning with 5,939 votes.
- 2014 Peters was unopposed in the Republican primary. Democrat Sheryl Knutson withdrew from running after the primary, and Peters was unopposed in the general election.
- 2016 Deb Peters defeated Lora Hubbel in the South Dakota State Senate District 9 Republican primary on a vote of 569 to 441 (56.3% to 43.4%). In the general election, Peters defeated John Koch on a vote of 6,426 to 3,398 (65.4% to 35.6%). The 2016 election represents Peters' 4th consecutive election for State Senate, and she is barred by state law from seeking another consecutive term for this office due to term limits.
