= Richard Engels =

American politician

Member of the South Dakota House of Representatives from the 9th district
- In office 2007–2010

Personal details
- Party: Democratic
- Spouse: Lisa
- Education: South Dakota State University, University of South Dakota
- Occupation: Attorney

Richard Engels was a Democratic member of the South Dakota House of Representatives. He represented the 9th district from 2003 to 2004, and again from 2007 to 2010. Engels was a Legislative Research Council Executive Board member in 2007–2008.
