= Jason Ravnsborg =

American attorney and politician

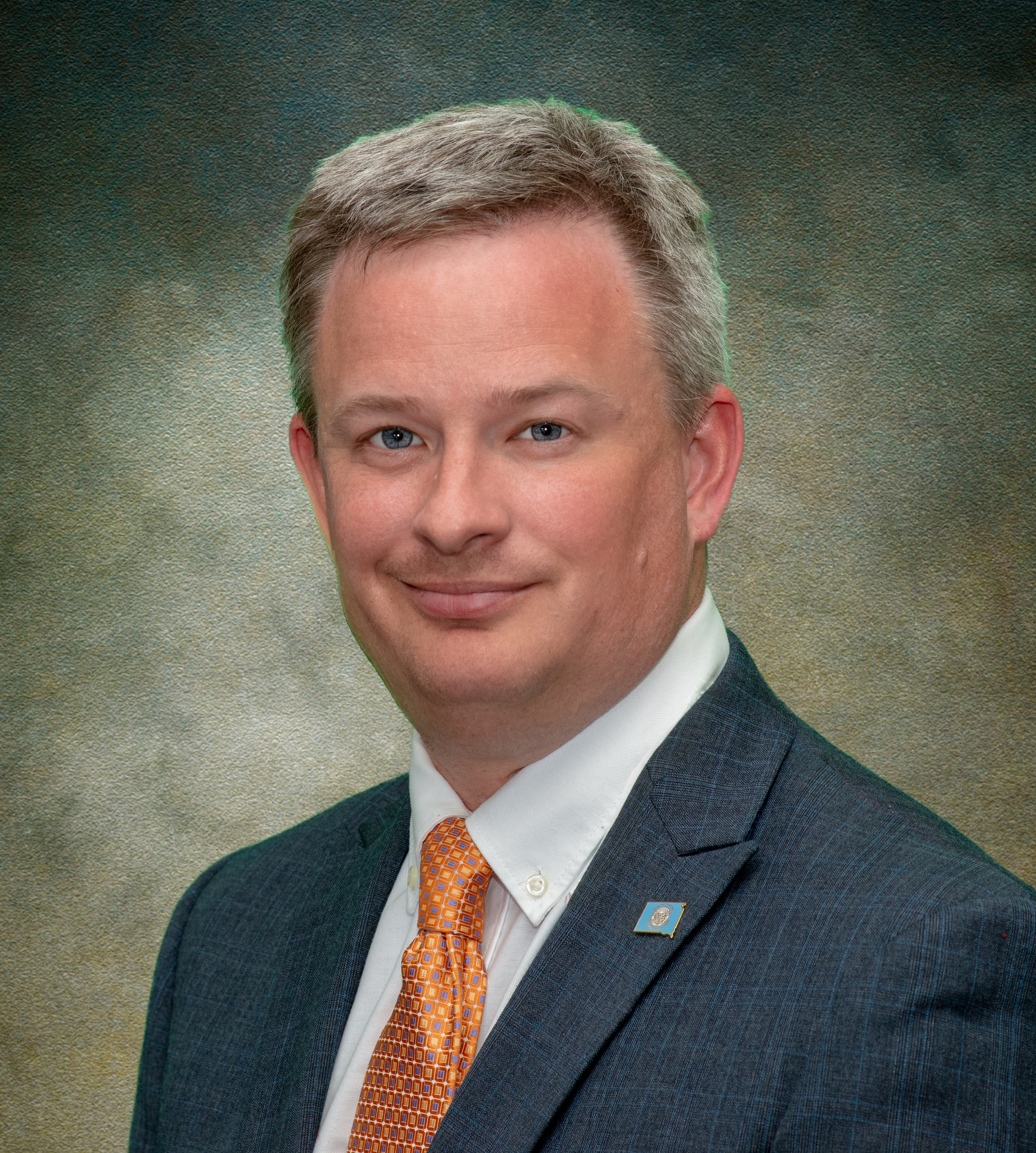

31st Attorney General of South Dakota
- In office January 5, 2019 – June 21, 2022; Suspended: April 12, 2022 – June 21, 2022
- Governor: Kristi Noem
- Preceded by: Marty Jackley
- Succeeded by: Mark Vargo

Personal details
- Born: Jason Richard Ravnsborg; April 12, 1976 (age 50) Cherokee, Iowa, U.S.
- Party: Republican
- Education: University of South Dakota (BS, MA, JD); Army War College (MSS)

Military service
- Allegiance: United States
- Branch/service: United States Army
- Years of service: 1996–present
- Rank: Lieutenant Colonel
- Commands: 394th Combat Service Support Battalion
- Battles/wars: War on terror • Iraq Campaign • Afghanistan Campaign
- Awards: Bronze Star; Meritorious Service Medal; Army Commendation Medal; Army Achievement Medal

Jason Richard Ravnsborg (born April 12, 1976) is an American attorney and politician. A Republican, he served as Attorney General of South Dakota from 2019 until his removal in 2022. Ravnsborg ran for the U.S. Senate in 2014, losing in the Republican primary to former Governor Mike Rounds, who won the general election.

Ravnsborg is a U.S. Army Reserve officer and combat veteran who has served tours in Afghanistan and Iraq. He was awarded the Bronze Star Medal for his service in Iraq. Before becoming attorney general, Ravnsborg was a lawyer in private practice and deputy state's attorney for Union County.

In 2020, following a political fundraiser, Ravnsborg struck and killed a pedestrian while driving. This led to him being charged and convicted with three misdemeanors and permanently barred from holding public office in the state.

== Early life and education ==
Jason Richard Ravnsborg (pronounced "Roundsberg") was born in Cherokee, Iowa, the son of Richard Ravnsborg and Jeanne (Gordon) Ravnsborg. He was raised on his family's farm and graduated from Cherokee Washington High School in 1994.

After high school, Ravnsborg attended the University of South Dakota, from which he graduated in 1998 with a Bachelor of Science in history and political science. He then attended the University of South Dakota School of Law, from which he graduated with a Juris Doctor in 2001. Also in 2001, Ravnsborg completed an M.A. in history from the University of South Dakota. Beginning in 1996, he participated in the Army Reserve Officers' Training Corps program and served in the Army Reserve. In 1998, he received a commission as a second lieutenant in the United States Army's Transportation Corps.

== Military career ==
As he advanced through the Army Reserve's ranks, Ravnsborg held company command four times. He also deployed on three different occasions: to Germany in support of Operation Enduring Freedom in 2003, to Iraq in support of Operation Iraqi Freedom in 2004, and to Afghanistan in support of Operation Enduring Freedom in 2009. He was awarded the Bronze Star Medal after coming under enemy fire in Iraq. From April 2017 to September 2019, he commanded the 394th Combat Service Support Battalion, in charge of over 600 soldiers in North Dakota, South Dakota, Nebraska, and Missouri. In April 2021, Ravnsborg announced that he would be promoted to colonel. In May, Army officials said that Ravnsborg's promotion would be delayed until his criminal charges were resolved.

== Legal career ==
Ravnsborg is licensed to practice law in South Dakota and Iowa, as well as the federal district courts for South Dakota, Iowa, Nebraska, the Eighth Circuit Court of Appeals, the District of Columbia Court of Appeals, the Federal Court of Claims, and the United States Supreme Court.

From 2001 to 2004, Ravnsborg was a law clerk for Timothy K. Connell, judge of the Fifth Judicial District in Rock County, Minnesota. In 2004, he joined the law firm of Harmelink and Fox in Yankton, South Dakota. In 2006, he became a partner at the firm. He also served as deputy state's attorney for Union County.

== Political career ==
=== 2014 United States Senate election ===
Ravnsborg ran for the United States Senate in the 2014 election. He came in fifth in the Republican primary. The nomination went to former governor Mike Rounds. From 2015 to 2018, Ravnsborg chaired the Yankton County Republican Committee.

Republican primary results
Party	Candidate	Votes	%
Republican	Mike Rounds	41,377	55.54%
Republican	Larry Rhoden	13,593	18.25%
Republican	Stace Nelson	13,179	17.69%
Republican	Annette Bosworth	4,283	5.75%
Republican	Jason Ravnsborg	2,066	2.77%
Total votes		74,490	100.00%

=== 2018 South Dakota attorney general election ===
On February 21, 2017, Ravnsborg announced his candidacy for attorney general in 2018. Opposing Ravnsborg for the Republican nomination were Chief Deputy Attorney General Charlie McGuigan, Lawrence County State's Attorney John Fitzgerald, and State Senator Lance Russell. McGuigan suspended his campaign before the nominating convention. In June 2018, Ravnsborg won the nomination at the Republican Convention in Pierre. In the first round of voting, Ravnsborg led with 47% of the vote; Russell had 27%. Fitzgerald had 26%, which eliminated Fitzgerald. Ravnsborg then defeated Russell 63% to 37% in the second vote.

2018 Attorney General Election Map by County; Ravnsborg=Red; Seiler=Blue

The Democratic nominee was former U.S. Attorney Randy Seiler.

Ravnsborg was endorsed in the general election by 40 county sheriffs, the Fraternal Order of Police, 30 state's attorneys, the National Rifle Association, South Dakota Right to Life, and the Family Heritage Alliance.

Ravnsborg defeated Seiler in the November 6 general election.

2018 South Dakota Attorney General election
Party	Candidate	Votes	%	±%
Republican	Jason Ravnsborg	179,071	55.16%	−5.07%
Democratic	Randy Seiler	145,558	44.84%	+12.26%
Total votes		324,629	100.0%	N/A
Republican hold				

=== Tenure as attorney general of South Dakota ===
==== Consumer and antitrust matters ====
The attorneys general of all 50 states, including Ravnsborg, supported the Telephone Robocall Abuse Criminal Enforcement and Deterrence (TRACE) Act, which passed Congress on overwhelming bipartisan majorities and became law in 2019. In 2019, Ravnsborg joined his fellow attorneys general by entering into an agreement with 12 phone companies to combat illegal robocalls. In 2020, he joined a bipartisan coalition of 52 state and territory attorneys general on USTelecom's Industry Traceback Group to bolster technological capabilities to improve enforcement against illegal robocallers.

In September 2019, Ravnsborg spoke in front of the U.S. Supreme Court about the opening of a bipartisan antitrust investigation into Google by 50 state attorneys general.

In May 2020, Ravnsborg was one of 11 state attorneys general from the Midwest and West who called for a federal antitrust investigation into the meatpacking industry; he argued that there is a disparity between the prices for liveweight cattle and the retail cost of beef, with four meatpacking companies that control about 80% of the cattle market.

In 2020, Honda entered into a $85 million multistate settlement to resolve allegations that it did not inform its consumers that it used airbags that posed a significant risk of rupture; Ravnsborg said that South Dakota's share would be slightly more than $2 million.

In 2021, Ravnsborg supported South Dakota opting into a $26 billion, multi-state settlement with the three major opioid distributors (Cardinal Health, McKesson Corp., and AmerisourceBergen) and Johnson & Johnson to resolve claims that the companies helped fuel the opioid epidemic. Under the settlement, South Dakota could receive approximately $50 million over 17 years. Ravnsborg said the settlement was the second-largest multi-state action by state attorneys general ever, after the Tobacco Master Settlement Agreement. South Dakota previously received about $1.2 million as part of a 47-state, $573 million settlement with McKinsey & Company, and $30,000 in a settlement with British pharmaceutical company Reckitt Benckiser Group. In September 2021, the three large U.S. drug distributors and Johnson & Johnson announced that 42 states, five territories and Washington, D.C., had signed onto the deal and it would proceed.

==== Guns ====
Ravnsborg said during his campaign he would fight to uphold District of Columbia v. Heller and McDonald v. City of Chicago. He is a National Rifle Association life member. Ravnsborg testified in support of SB 47, a bill to allow carrying of guns without a permit. Governor Kristi Noem signed the bill into law, making South Dakota the 14th state to enact such a law.

==== Organizational involvement ====
In 2019, Ravnsborg was named to several standing committees of the National Association of Attorneys General. The same year, he was appointed to the executive council for Special Olympics and Law Enforcement Torch Run. In 2020, Ravnsborg became co-chair of the NAAG Gaming Committee with Arizona Attorney General Mark Brnovich. Also in 2020, he was elected as second vice chair and a member of the executive board of the Conference of Western Attorneys General. In June 2021, Ravnsborg was elected vice chair of the Conference of Western Attorneys General.

==== Criminal law ====
===== Probation and drug policy =====
Ravnsborg has unsuccessfully sought to restrict presumptive probation in South Dakota. South Dakota's presumptive probation law mandates that persons convicted of certain nonviolent lower-level felonies (such as drug possession or use) be sentenced to probation unless a judge determines that a "significant risk" to the public exists. Ravnsborg made proposals to eliminate or restrict presumptive probation central to his campaign and tenure, but the proposals failed due to insufficient support from the state legislature for the proposal in 2019. State lawmakers and Governor Noem expressed concern about the proposal after a budget estimate projected that it would cost the state $54 million in additional jail and prison costs over a decade. Ravnsborg pushed the proposal again in 2020.

In 2019, Ravnsborg took the position that industrial hemp and all forms of cannabidiol (CBD oil) are illegal in South Dakota (see marijuana in South Dakota). In 2020, he opposed a state legislative proposal to reduce the crime of "ingesting a controlled substance" from a felony to a class-one misdemeanor, arguing that the proposal would insufficiently deter drug use; a state senate committee rejected the proposal, leaving South Dakota as the only U.S. state that makes ingestion a felony.

==== Death penalty ====
In 2019, Ravnsborg testified against a bill to prohibit capital punishment of any person with a severe mental illness. The bill was defeated in committee 4–3, but it was voted on out of committee and was defeated by the state senate 21−12.

In 2019, Ravnsborg appeared in the 7th Circuit Court in Rapid City to request a warrant of execution for Charles Russell Rhines for the 1992 murder of Donnivan Schaeffer. Judge Robert A. Mandel granted the warrant. The South Dakota Supreme Court subsequently denied Rhines's request for a stay of execution. After appeals and a clemency petition were denied, Rhines was executed.

==== Investigation of Minnehaha County state's attorney ====
In 2019, Noem requested that Ravnsborg investigate Minnehaha County State's Attorney Aaron McGowan after he was absent for two months. Ravnsborg's report determined that McGowan did not commit a crime, but outlined numerous alcohol-related incidents that Noem called "unsettling"; after the report was released, McGowan issued an apology. In December 2019, McGowan resigned, citing ill health and negative press attention.

==== Lawsuit to block ERA ratification ====
In December 2019, Alabama, Louisiana, and South Dakota sued to prevent the implementation of the Equal Rights Amendment to the U.S. Constitution. On January 6, 2020, Department of Justice Office of Legal Counsel official Steven Engel issued an opinion in response to the suit, writing, "We conclude that Congress had the constitutional authority to impose a deadline on the ratification of the ERA and, because that deadline has expired, the ERA Resolution is no longer pending before the States." The OLC argued in part that Congress had the authority to impose a deadline for the ERA and that it did not have the authority to retroactively extend the deadline once it had expired. On February 27, 2020, Alabama, Louisiana and South Dakota entered into a joint stipulation and voluntary dismissal with the Archivist of the United States. The joint stipulation incorporated the Department of Justice's Office of Legal Counsel's opinion; stated that the Archivist would not certify the adoption of the Equal Rights Amendment; and stated that if the Department of Justice ever concludes that the 1972 ERA Resolution is still pending and that the Archivist therefore has authority to certify the ERA's adoption, the Archivist will make no certification concerning ratification of the ERA until at least 45 days following the announcement of the Department of Justice's conclusion, absent a court order compelling him to do so sooner. On March 2, 2020, Federal District Court Judge L. Scott Coogler entered an order regarding the Joint Stipulation and Plaintiff's Voluntary Dismissal, granting the dismissal without prejudice.

==== Missing persons ====
In 2020, Ravnsborg introduced legislation in the state legislature to create a missing-person and runaway-child clearinghouse; the legislature unanimously approved the bill, and Noem signed it into law. Ravnsborg has held "Missing Persons Mondays SD" to highlight one missing-persons case each week.

==== Faithless electors cases ====
In 2020, Ravnsborg led a coalition of 44 states and the District of Columbia in filing an amicus brief with the U.S. Supreme Court supporting Colorado and Washington regarding the Electoral College and faithless electors in the cases of Chiafalo v. Washington and Colorado Department of State v. Baca; the brief supported the right of states to bind electors to their states' votes. The Supreme Court unanimously ruled that a state may penalize a "faithless elector" for breaking their pledge by voting for someone other than the presidential candidate who won the state's popular vote.

==== LGBT rights ====
In 2019, Ravnsborg signed onto an amicus brief in Bostock v. Clayton County urging the Supreme Court to find that Title VII of the Civil Rights Act of 1964 provides no protection against employment discrimination on the basis of sexual orientation or gender identity.

==== Presidential elector ====
At the 2020 Republican State Convention, Ravnsborg was elected one of South Dakota's three Republican presidential electors along with Noem and Lieutenant Governor Larry Rhoden. Incumbent Republicans Donald Trump and Mike Pence won the state in the November election. When South Dakota's electors met on December 14, Noem was visiting Trump in Washington and was replaced by state Republican chairman Dan Lederman. Ravnsborg, Rhoden, and Lederman then formally ratified South Dakota's results by casting their electoral votes for Trump and Pence.

==== Joining challenge to 2020 presidential election results ====
On December 8, 2020, Texas Attorney General Ken Paxton sued Georgia, Michigan, Wisconsin, and Pennsylvania, where certified results showed Joe Biden defeated Trump. Paxton, Ravnsborg, and 16 other states' attorneys general who supported Paxton's challenge of the election results alleged numerous instances of unconstitutional actions in the four states' presidential ballot tallies, arguments that had already been rejected in other state and federal courts. In Texas v. Pennsylvania, Paxton asked the U.S. Supreme Court to invalidate the states' 62 electoral votes, allowing Trump to win a second presidential term. Because the suit has been characterized as a dispute between states, the Supreme Court retained original jurisdiction, though it often declines to hear such suits. There was no evidence of consequential illegal voting in the election. Paxton's lawsuit included claims that had been tried unsuccessfully in other courts and shown to be false. Officials from each of the four states said Paxton's lawsuit recycled false and disproven claims of irregularity. The merits of the objections were sharply criticized by legal experts and politicians. Election law expert Rick Hasen called the lawsuit "the dumbest case I've ever seen filed on an emergency basis at the Supreme Court." U.S. Senator Ben Sasse said the situation of Paxton initiating the lawsuit "looks like a fella begging for a pardon filed a PR stunt", in reference to Paxton's own state and federal legal issues (securities fraud charges and abuse of office allegations). On December 11, the Supreme Court quickly rejected the suit in an unsigned opinion.

==== Other ====
In 2019, Ravnsborg filed an amicus brief in support of the Kimberly Rice Kaestner 1992 Trust in the U.S. Supreme Court in North Carolina Department of Revenue v. Kimberly Rice Kaestner 1992 Family Trust. Alaska, Nevada, and Texas joined South Dakota's amicus brief. In 2019, the Court unanimously ruled in favor of the trust.

In 2019, the Indigenous Environmental Network, Sierra Club and other groups sued Ravnsborg, Noem and Pennington County Sheriff Kevin Thom over legislation passed in response to protests against the Keystone Pipeline. The plaintiffs argued that two laws, one creating a fund to cover the costs of policing pipeline protests and one seeking to raise revenue for the fund by creating civil penalties for advising, directing, or encouraging participation in rioting, violate First Amendment rights by incentivizing the state to sue protesters.

In 2020, Ravnsborg announced that a second law-enforcement training academy would open in Minnehaha County.

In July 2021, Ravnsborg appointed Paul Swedlund as the state's first solicitor general. Traditionally, the state solicitor general handles all federal cases, amicus briefs and letters.

== Vehicular violation history ==
Ravnsborg pleaded guilty to six speeding infractions in South Dakota between 2014 and 2018, paying a fine for each, and two more in Iowa, one in 1996 and one in 2003. On August 22, 2021, four days before his scheduled trial on the charges arising from Joseph Boever's death, he received another speeding ticket, his seventh in South Dakota since 2014.

In early April 2022, the state Department of Public Safety released a report on Ravnsborg's driving history. The report, which the department provided to members of the legislature as part of their impeachment inquiry, revealed that Ravnsborg had been the subject of 27 traffic stop reports in three states since 1996. The stops resulted in 12 citations and 15 warnings. Nine of the citations were for speeding, including instances where he drove as much as 22 miles an hour over the posted speed limit. Of the 15 warnings, 10 were for speeding. DPS secretary Craig Price concluded in the report that Ravsnborg's driving record, coupled with the circumstances surrounding the fatal accident in which he was involved, indicated his unfitness for office.

== Fatal pedestrian strike ==
=== Death and investigation ===
On September 12, 2020, Ravnsborg struck and killed 55-year-old pedestrian Joseph Boever on U.S. Highway 14, west of Highmore. Ravnsborg had been driving home from a South Dakota Republican Party fundraiser at Rooster's Bar & Grill in Redfield, about 110 miles (180 km) from his home in Pierre. He later said that after the collision, while still in his car, he thought he had hit a large animal (perhaps a deer) and called 911 to report the collision. In addition, he said that after making the 911 call he exited his car to survey the damage. Sheriff Mike Volek inspected Ravnsborg's car, which was too damaged to drive. Volek then lent Ravnsborg his personal vehicle so Ravnsborg could drive himself home.

Boever had been walking along the side of the highway. According to two of Boever's cousins, Boever was walking back to his pickup truck, which he had crashed into a ditch along the highway earlier that day. Ravnsborg said he discovered Boever's body the next morning when he returned the sheriff's car and went to the scene of the collision to search for the carcass of the deer he thought he had struck. The South Dakota Department of Public Safety began an investigation of the collision. Investigators from North Dakota were sent to investigate the crash because of the conflict of interest created by the fact that South Dakota's public safety department reports to the attorney general. The investigators indicated that Boever had been stuck partially inside Ravnsborg's vehicle for an undetermined amount of time. Boever's broken reading glasses were discovered inside Ravnsborg's Ford Taurus, leading detectives to tell Ravnsborg that "his face was in your windshield"; Ravnsborg denied seeing Boever's body or the glasses. Investigators also indicated Boever had been carrying a flashlight when he was struck, and that it was still on and functioning when they arrived at the accident scene after Ravnsborg reported finding Boever's body. Volek said that on the night of the crash, he saw a light at the side of the road, but believed it to be a reflection off a part of Ravnsborg's car. Boever's wife said she was not notified of his death until 22 hours after the collision.

Later in September, investigators interviewed Ravnsborg, reviewing the events that occurred before he called 911 at 10:24 p.m. the night of the incident. Investigators said Ravnsborg unlocked one of his two phones at around 10:20, checked his email and visited the Dakota Free Press website. Around a minute later Ravnsborg visited the RealClearPolitics website. About a minute after that, he visited the Just The News website and reviewed an article about Joe Biden and China. Ravnsborg initially denied using his phones while driving on the night of the crash. After investigators confronted him with the evidence, he changed his version of events from not having used his phone to having used it, but setting it aside before the crash: "I remember looking at it [the Just the News article] and that's when I set my phone down, prior to" the collision, he said.

Investigators responded that they were focused on "a minute to two minutes before" the 911 call because they estimated that from the time of impact, Ravnsborg would require around that amount of time to "look at the damage, figure out what's going on" before calling police. The interview was made public in February 2021. After Ravnsborg called 911, Volek responded. Ravnsborg has said that he did not consume any alcohol at the event from which he was driving home, and Volek did not administer a breathalyzer test.

In November, investigators for the state Department of Public Safety (DPS) indicated that Ravnsborg had been driving while distracted at the time of the incident, but did not say what caused the distraction. The secretary of the DPS indicated that the department was making details and evidence from its investigation available to the state's attorney in Hyde County.

In early December, the deputy state's attorney for Hyde County indicated that she and a team of state's attorneys from throughout the state were reviewing the evidence and would decide by Christmas whether to recommend charges. The team was still reviewing evidence as of December 28, when the state's attorney for Minnehaha County confirmed that they were waiting results from testing on "debris that was in the middle of the accident scene" and that a decision on whether to charge Ravnsborg was still pending. Noem criticized the slowness of the investigation, suggesting in January 2021 that a grand jury be empaneled in order to bring a speedy resolution to the case.

=== Criminal charges and plea agreement ===
On February 17, 2021, Ravnsborg was charged with three misdemeanors: operating his vehicle while using his cell phone, driving outside his lane, and careless driving. Each charge carries a maximum penalty of 30 days in jail and a fine of $500. Prosecutors chose not to charge Ravnsborg with vehicular homicide or second-degree manslaughter, and South Dakota has no negligent homicide law. On March 12, 2021, court officials moved the trial proceedings from Hyde County to Hughes County and Ravnsborg pleaded not guilty to all charges. A trial date was set for August 2021.

In July 2021, Ravnsborg's legal team filed a motion seeking release of Boever's psychiatric and psychological records, intending to learn whether he was treated for "suicidal ideation" that might have led him to cause the collision. Boever's cousin disputed the idea that Boever would have committed suicide by allowing himself to be struck by a car. Judge John Brown granted the motion and allowed for in camera review of Boever's mental health records. The proceedings were subsequently moved to Stanley County for Brown's convenience.

On August 26, 2021, as part of a plea deal, Ravnsborg pleaded no contest to making an illegal lane change and using a phone while driving. Prosecutors dropped the careless driving charge. Ravnsborg avoided jail time but was fined $1,000 and ordered to pay court costs. The victim's family was angered by the sentence, considering it too lenient, and was also upset that Ravnsborg was not required to attend the plea and sentencing hearing.

=== Impeachment ===
On February 24, 2021, in response to the charges and the public release of almost six hours of detectives' interviews with Ravnsborg, Noem called on Ravnsborg to resign. Ravnsborg said he would not resign and believed he could still effectively perform the attorney general's duties. That same day, a group in the South Dakota House of Representatives led by Will Mortenson submitted two articles of impeachment, with Mortenson saying, "I do not believe Attorney General Ravnsborg belongs in prison, but I know he does not belong in the Office of the Attorney General anymore." Majority leader Kent Peterson and minority leader Jamie Smith co-sponsored the articles.

In March 2021, the state House voted 57–11 to pause impeachment proceedings against Ravnsborg while a judge considered the criminal case against him.

In September 2021, Department of Public Safety Secretary Craig Price provided the results of his department's investigation to leaders of the state legislature. In his transmittal letter, Price wrote that in his opinion and the opinions of the investigating officers, Ravnsborg should have been charged with second-degree manslaughter. In response, Beadle County State's Attorney Michael Moore, who assisted in the Ravnsborg prosecution, disputed the investigators' findings and insisted there was not enough evidence to charge Ravnsborg with manslaughter. After receiving Price's report, legislative leaders indicated that legislators would take time to review the evidence and consider whether to restart impeachment proceedings against Ravnsborg.

In November 2021, the State House voted 58–10 to establish a Special Investigative Committee to investigate Ravnsborg and report back to the House with a recommendation on impeachment. House Speaker Spencer Gosch appointed nine members (seven Republicans and two Democrats) to the committee, which had subpoena power. A timeline for the committee to make its report and recommendations was not set; Gosch said that the committee might not make its recommendation until the House convened for its regular January 2022 session.

On March 28, 2022, the special committee voted not to recommend Ravnsborg's impeachment. The committee's majority report argued that Ravnsborg's actions did not meet the state constitution's impeachable conduct requirements—"drunkenness, crimes, corrupt conduct, malfeasance or misdemeanors in office."

The full House of Representatives then planned a session for April 12 to determine how to proceed. After the March 28 committee vote, the Department of Public Safety officers who investigated the crash said they had been prevented from presenting members with the details of their investigation into Ravnsborg's crash, with the committee instead opting to question them based on documents previously provided to the committee. Despite the committee vote, on April 12 the full House voted 36–31 in favor of an impeachment resolution. As a result, Ravnsborg was suspended from his official duties while he awaited trial in the South Dakota Senate. Conviction required a two-thirds vote and would remove him from office.

==== Conviction ====
On June 21, 2022, the state Senate convicted Ravnsborg on two counts. By a vote of 24–9, he was convicted of crimes related to Boever's death. By a 31–2 vote, senators convicted Ravnsborg of malfeasance in office. In addition, the Senate voted to permanently bar him from ever again holding office in South Dakota. Noem appointed Mark Vargo, the Pennington County state's attorney and lead prosecutor in the impeachment trial, to complete Ravnsborg's unexpired term.

Party political offices
Preceded by Marty Jackley	Republican nominee for Attorney General of South Dakota; 2018	Succeeded by Marty Jackley
Legal offices
Preceded by Marty Jackley	Attorney General of South Dakota; 2019–2022	Succeeded by Charlie McGuigan; Acting
