= Marty Jackley =

American lawyer (born 1970)

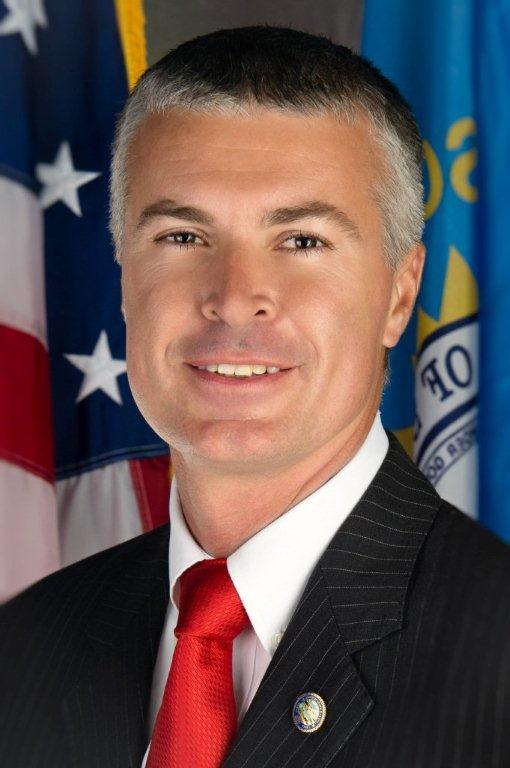
- Official portrait, 2006

Member-elect of the U.S. House of Representatives from South Dakota's at-large district
- Assuming office January 3, 2027
- Succeeding: Dusty Johnson

30th and 33rd Attorney General of South Dakota
- Incumbent
- Assumed office January 3, 2023
- Governor: Kristi Noem; Larry Rhoden
- Preceded by: Mark Vargo
- In office September 4, 2009 – January 5, 2019
- Governor: Mike Rounds; Dennis Daugaard
- Preceded by: Larry Long
- Succeeded by: Jason Ravnsborg

39th United States Attorney for the District of South Dakota
- In office July 2006 – September 4, 2009
- President: George W. Bush
- Preceded by: Steven Mullin
- Succeeded by: Brendan Johnson

Personal details
- Born: Martin Jacob Jackley; October 13, 1970 (age 56) Sturgis, South Dakota, U.S.
- Party: Republican
- Spouse: Angela Jackley
- Children: 2
- Education: South Dakota School of Mines and Technology (BS); University of South Dakota (JD)

Martin Jacob Jackley (born October 13, 1970) is an American attorney and politician who is serving as the Attorney General of South Dakota since 2023, having previously served from 2009 to 2019. He assumed office as Attorney General again in 2023 after winning the 2022 election unopposed. He previously served as the 39th United States Attorney for the District of South Dakota. He ran unsuccessfully for Governor of South Dakota in 2018, losing the Republican primary to Kristi Noem.

In 2026, Jackley declined to run for re-election to a fourth term as Attorney General, instead filing to run for Congress to represent South Dakota's at-large congressional district.

== Early life and education ==
Jackley was raised in Sturgis, South Dakota, and graduated from Sturgis Brown High School in 1988. He graduated cum laude from the South Dakota School of Mines and Technology in 1992 with a Bachelor of Science in electrical engineering. He earned a Juris Doctor from the University of South Dakota School of Law in 1995.

== Legal career ==
From 1995 through 1997, Jackley served as a law clerk for then-Chief Judge Richard Battey of the United States District Court for the District of South Dakota. Jackley joined the Rapid City law firm Gunderson, Palmer, Nelson, and Ashmore. As a partner at that firm, he focused his practice on construction & engineering law and real property disputes. At that time, he also served as a Special Assistant Attorney General for South Dakota, prosecuting controlled substance felonies.

== United States Attorney (2006–2009) ==
In 2006, Jackley was recommended by U.S. Senator John Thune to replace Steven K. Mullin as United States Attorney for the District of South Dakota and was nominated by President George W. Bush. Jackley was unanimously confirmed by the U.S. Senate. In 2008, he was named the South Dakota Prosecutor of the Year by the South Dakota State's Attorneys Association. Jackley was succeeded as U.S. Attorney by Brendan Johnson.

== Attorney General of South Dakota (2009–2019) ==
Governor Mike Rounds appointed Jackley to succeed Larry Long as Attorney General of South Dakota in 2009 after Long was appointed as a local judge. Jackley won reelection in 2010 and in 2014.

=== Tenure ===
==== EB-5 Scandal ====
EB-5 was a national investor-visa program that granted green cards to undocumented immigrants and their families who have invested $500,000 in approved but not guaranteed investments. South Dakota and Vermont were the only states that managed EB-5 funds through a state-controlled entity. On October 20, 2013, Richard Benda died from a gunshot wound. Approximately a month and a half later, Jackley stated that the death was a suicide. Initially it was questioned how a man could kill oneself with a shotgun. An updated attorney general's report said, without any explanation, that a stick was used. Benda had served as Governor Mike Rounds director of economic development. Nearly 3 years after Benda's death, Jackley charged Joop Bollen with five felony counts of unauthorized disposal of personal property to security interest. In February 2017, Bollen pleaded guilty to one count and was sentenced to a $2,000 fine and two years of probation.

==== GEAR UP scandal ====
On September 17, 2015, Scott Westerhuis shot and killed his four children, his wife, Nicole, and then set his house on fire, before killing himself. Westerhuis was the business manager of Mid Central Educational Cooperative, which was contracted out by the state to distribute grant money. Hours before the Westerhuis home was found burning, Mid-Central Educational Cooperative, where Scott Westerhuis was the business manager, had lost a multi-million dollar state contract. The decision by the state came after a series of financial problems turned up in audits of the business that administered a program that encourages Native American Students to go to college, called GEAR UP. Nearly, three years later in June 2018, Jackley lost the first of three possible GEAR UP cases as the jury acquitted Stephanie Hubers was found not guilty of grand theft, grand theft by deception and alternative receiving stolen property charges. In September 2018, Jackley made a plea deal with Dan Guericke the former educational cooperative director, wherein Guericke pled guilty to one felony count of falsifying evidence. Guericke had originally been charged with six felony counts alleging that he falsified evidence and conspired to offer forged or fraudulent evidence. In October 2018, Jackley lost his second Gear Up jury trial when the jury acquitted Stacy Phelps, the former CEO of the American Institute for Innovation, on all charges.

==== Supported SB70, Adult Criminal Justice Reform law (2013) ====
On January 18, 2013, Jackley testified before the Senate State Affairs Committee in support of SB 70. On February 6, 2013, Governor Dennis Daugaard signed SB 70 into law.

==== Supported SB 73 Juvenile Criminal Justice Reform law (2015) ====
On January 23, 2015, Jackley testified before the Senate State Affairs Committee in support of SB 73. On March 13, 2015, Governor Daugaard signed SB 73 into law.

==== Annette Bosworth case ====
On Wednesday, June 4, 2014, one day after losing the U.S. Senate primary, physician Annette Bosworth was arrested on charges of perjury and filing false documents, which charges were brought by Jackley. Bosworth called the charges a “political intimidation scheme” against her by Jackley, who was appointed by then Governor and now U.S. Senator Mike Rounds who just defeated Bosworth the day prior. Many questioned why a plea deal could not be struck. Bosworth stated “There’s no deal that will take away any of the felonies, so of course it’s going to trial”. “Paul Jacobs, a blogger who says he had experience with an overly aggressive prosecutor in Oklahoma over election issues several years ago. Jacobs says Jackley’s prosecution looks more like “persecution,” a line Bosworth repeats in her link to it.” Bosworth claimed that Jackley was prosecuting her for political and personal reasons. On May 27, 2015, Annette Bosworth was convicted via jury trial of six felonies for perjury and six felonies for filing false documents. On July 19, 2017, the South Dakota Supreme Court vacated the six convictions for perjury, but affirmed the remaining convictions. On November 3, 2017, Judge Jon Brown granted Bosworth a suspended imposition of sentence, which means she no longer has any felonies on her record.

==== Flandreau marijuana case ====
On August 3, 2016, Jackley filed 3 charges against Eric Hagen regarding conspiracy to possess, attempt to possess, and possession of more than 10 pounds of marijuana. On May 24, 2017, a jury acquitted Hagen of all charges. The verdict was seen as a setback for Jackley in his bid for Governor.

==== Gene Abdallah nomination ====
On October 23, 2017, Jackley appointed state Representative Gene Abdallah to the state Board of Pardons and Paroles. On November 28, 2017, a former lobbyist, Tiffany Campbell, accused Abdallah of sexual harassment when he was in the legislature. An appointment to the Board of Pardons and Parole must be confirmed by the state Senate As a result of the reports of sexual harassment, Abdallah withdrew from the Board of Pardons and Parole on January 16, 2018.

==== Laura Zylstra lawsuit ====
In 2011, Division of Criminal Investigation (DCI) agent, Laura Zylstra, filed a sexual harassment claim against a former Brown County deputy who made inappropriate comments towards her. Zylstra was then demoted and transferred from Aberdeen to Pierre. She then resigned in 2012. In September 2015, Zylstra sued DCI Director Bryan Gortmaker claiming she had been retaliated against with response to sexual harassment. In December 2017, the jury awarded Zylstra $1.2 million in damages finding that she had suffered retaliation and discrimination. Zylstra thanked the jury for “giving me justice.” She had alleged violations of the Civil Rights Act and the South Dakota Human Relations Act. In May 2018, Federal District Court Judge Charles B. Kornmann ordered DCI Director, Bryan Gortmaker, to appear in court as the state failed to pay the $1.5M settlement. Jackley claimed that the settlement was not being delayed and that Zylstra's lawyers and his gubernatorial opponent Kristi Noem were playing politics. Zylstra disputed in detail that there was a delay in the payments and personally appeared in campaign ads stating “I don’t think Marty Jackley should be Governor, I don’t think he should be the Attorney General”.

== 2018 gubernatorial election ==
=== Candidates ===
In November 2016, Jackley declared his intention to seek the Republican nomination for Governor of South Dakota. Congresswoman Kristi Noem also declared that she would seek the Republican nomination for governor. Terry LaFleur and Lora Hubel also declared their intention to seek the Republican nomination for governor, however, LaFleur & Hubel were unable to obtain the required number of signatures to make the primary ballot.

=== Debates ===
Jackley and Noem participated in three debates.

==== First debate ====
In the first debate both candidates tried to define the other. Jackley stated: “It’s Washington experience versus South Dakota experience.” “Marty’s background has been being a government lawyer,” Noem said.

==== Second debate ====
In the second debate, Noem discussed Marty's scandals. “In EB5, the state oversight program, nobody went to jail. On Gear-Up, still, nobody’s been punished. When we talk about what’s been going on in Brookings with the Global Aquaponics scam—a con artist, Tobias Ritesman, held a fundraiser for Marty Jackley. Marty attended his phony groundbreaking for his phony project,” Noem says. “People lost hundreds of thousands of dollars. Still, nobody’s been investigated and nobody’s been prosecuted. That needs to change in our state.”

Jackley was thrown on the defensive during the second debate. “Congresswoman, he didn’t hold a fundraiser for me. I was at an event that he was at, and I did go to a ground breaking because that’s what important in South Dakota,” Jackley says. “When we have businesses expanding I think it’s important that we attend those. You talk about Gear-Up, there hasn’t been a sentencing because these defendants are presumed innocent. But I as attorney general, unlike Washington, have done something about it. I actually formed a grand jury. Indictments have been issued. They’re schedule to begin jury trials in July—or, excuse me—June, June 26th and I plan on trying those personally, because that’s what a leader does.”

==== Final debate ====
In the final debate, Jackley and Noem took questions about workforce development, anti-discrimination laws, drugs, uniting democrats and republicans in the state to make critical decisions and much more. A subject of disagreement was the state's 134 boards and commissions. Noem said she wanted to streamline different processes for licensure, eliminating "red tape" but Jackley disagreed. "Every time that a proposal comes forward to create a new 'blue ribbon' task force, a board or a commission, what typically comes with that is another layer of bureaucracy," Noem said. Jackley defended the government bureaucracy. "We need a governor that understands that various different boards, isn't out there criticizing different boards and saying that type of service isn't important," Jackley said. Jackley spoke about putting together a task force to work on government transparency and open records laws. "I'm committed when I become governor to put forth a taskforce ...because we need to take a look at the open records law," he said. They both ended the debate with a jab at the other. "It really comes to down to Washington experience versus South Dakota experience," Jackley said. "The congresswoman has been spending considerable time and effort talking about Marty Jackley, but I'm talking about you, South Dakota." "Days ago he stood up and talked about protecting victims while behind the scenes he was actively working to silence one to further his political career," Noem said. "You deserve a governor who will be honest with you, who will tell you the truth and who is willing to be accountable."

==== Primary results ====
Jackley lost in the June primary to U.S. Representative Kristi Noem. Jackley only won 7 of South Dakota's 66 counties. Jackley received 45,069 (44%) votes and Noem received 57,437 (56%) votes.

== Private sector (2019–2022) ==
After the election, Jackley rejoined the firm of Gunderson, Palmer, Nelson and Ashmore and opened up a law office in Pierre, South Dakota. On August 27, 2019, Jackley was sworn in as the Jones County States Attorney after he was appointed to fill the vacancy left when Anita Fuoss resigned. He did not run for a full term and was succeeded by Kirby Krogman in January 2021.

=== Measure 24 ===
In 2017, an initiated measure was started to ban financial contributions from out of state residents, political committees and entities to ballot question committees. On June 14, 2017, the Legislative Research Counsel, proposed edits to the Initiated Measure. On July 31, 2017, Jackley, while serving as Attorney General, submitted his Attorney General's explanation regarding IM 24 to the Secretary of State pursuant to SDCL 12-13-25.1. IM 24 passed with 174,960 (55.52%) votes for the initiated measure and 140,172 (44.48%) votes against it. On March 4, 2019, South Dakota Voice, a grassroots ballot question committee, headed by Cory Heidelberger, filed a lawsuit to stop IM 24. On April 17, 2019, a complaint was filed against the state to invalidate IM 24 by Jackley approximately six weeks after initial lawsuit by Heidelberger and despite having written the Attorney General explanation for the state. On May 9, 2019, Federal Judge Charles Kornmann struck down IM 24. South Dakota Voice was awarded attorney fees from the state in the amount of $32,100; expenses in the amount of $1,083.90 and costs in the amount of $505.40. Jackley was awarded attorney fees for his clients nearly three times of South Dakota Voice in the amount of $79,640.00, despite starting six weeks after the South Dakota Voice complaint.

=== Representation of T. Denny Sanford ===
In 2020, it was reported that T. Denny Sanford, the richest man in South Dakota, was being investigated for possession of child pornography. Sanford was represented by Jackley. Investigators obtained a search warrant before referring the case to the United States Department of Justice. The investigation has led several institutions towards reconsideration of his philanthropy.

On October 27, 2021, the South Dakota Supreme Court unanimously ruled against the "Implicated Individual" that search warrants that were sought will be unsealed, pending any motion(s) for rehearing. On November 17, 2021, the South Dakota Supreme Court unsealed records confirming that T. Denny Sanford was the implicated individual and that five search warrants were issued during the investigation. The documents included the contents of the warrants, the return of the warrant and the inventory dating back to 2019.

== Attorney General of South Dakota (2023–present) ==
=== 2022 attorney general election ===
On March 1, 2021, Jackley announced that he would run for attorney general in the 2022 election. He won the general election unopposed.

== Personal life ==
Jackley lives in Pierre, South Dakota, with his two children, Michael and Isabella.

== Electoral history ==
2014 Election results by county

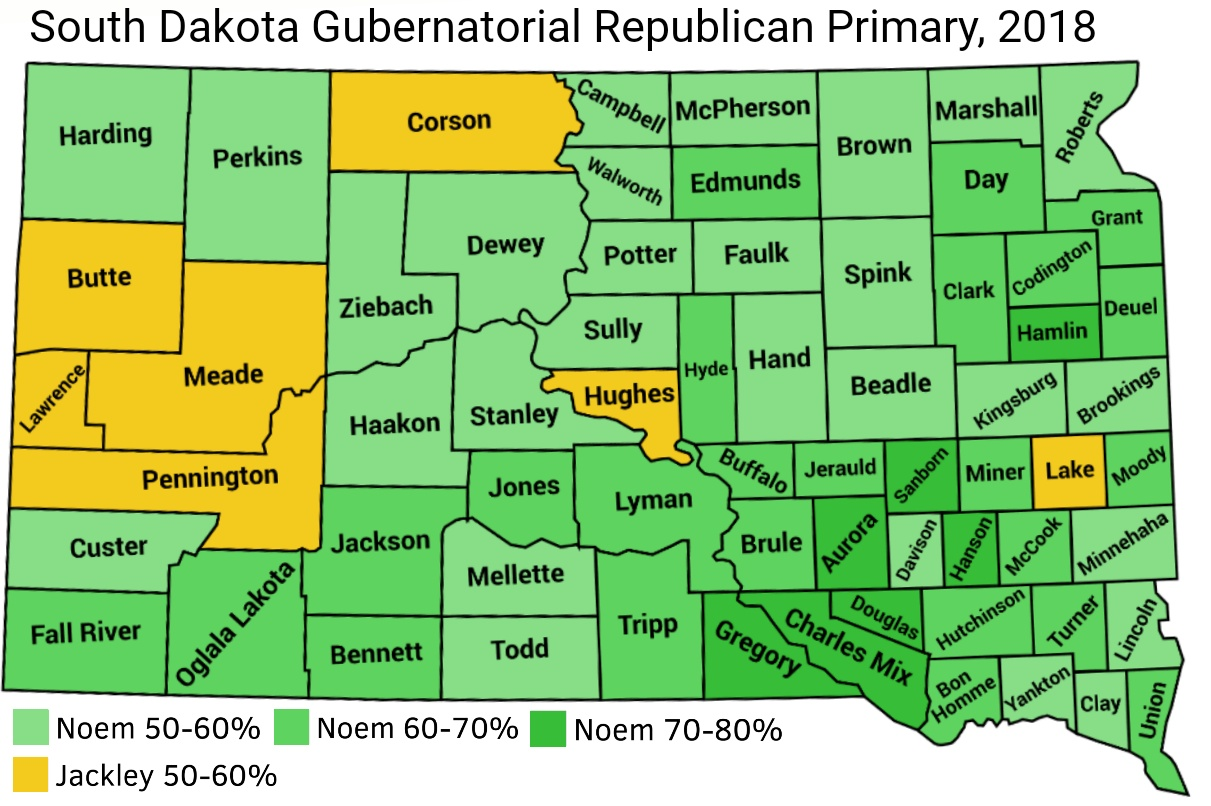
Map showing the results of the 2018 Republican Gubernatorial primary in South Dakota by County.

South Dakota Attorney General Election, 2010
Party	Candidate	Votes	%
Republican	Marty Jackley (inc.)	202,499	66.90
Democratic	Ron Volesky	100,182	33.10

South Dakota Attorney General Election, 2014
Party	Candidate	Votes	%
Republican	Marty Jackley (inc.)	208,848	82.00
Libertarian	Chad Haber	45,856	18.00

2018 Republican primary election – South Dakota Governor
Party	Candidate	Votes	%
Republican	Kristi Noem	57,437	56
Republican	Marty Jackley	45,069	44
Total votes		102,506	100

Legal offices
Preceded by Steven Mullin	United States Attorney for the District of South Dakota; 2006–2009	Succeeded by Brendan Johnson
Preceded by Larry Long	Attorney General of South Dakota; 2009–2019	Succeeded by Jason Ravnsborg
Preceded by Mark Vargo	Attorney General of South Dakota; 2023–present	Incumbent
Party political offices
Preceded by Larry Long	Republican nominee for Attorney General of South Dakota; 2010, 2014	Succeeded by Jason Ravnsborg
Preceded by Jason Ravnsborg	Republican nominee for Attorney General of South Dakota; 2022	Succeeded by Lance Russell
U.S. House of Representatives
Preceded by Dusty Johnson	Member of the U.S. House of Representatives from South Dakota's at-large congressional district Taking office 2027	Elect
