= Munson (surname) =

Munson is a surname. Notable people with the surname include:

- Aeneas Munson (1734–1826), American physician
- Alex R. Munson (born 1941), Chief Judge of the District Court for the Northern Mariana Islands
- Audrey Munson (1891–1996), American artist's model and film actress
- Ben Munson, American politician
- Benjamin Munson (1916–2003), American physician
- Benjamin Munson (professor), American professor
- Bill Munson (1941–2000), American football player
- Calvin Munson (born 1994), American football player
- Carlos Munson (1869–1940), Cuban-American businessman, philanthropist, and politician
- Charles Arthur Munson (1857–1922), Canadian politician
- Chuck Munson, anarchist, blogger
- Clara C. Munson (1861–1938), American politician
- Cyndi Munson (born 1985), American politician
- Dale Munson (1931–2012), American television and radio personality
- David Munson (disambiguation), multiple people
- Donald E. Munson (born 1936), American politician
- Donald F. Munson (born 1937), Maryland State Senator
- Douglas Anne Munson (1948–2003), American attorney, teacher, and author
- Edward Lyman Munson (1868–1947), brigadier general (US Army), Professor of Preventive Medicine
- Eric Munson (born 1977), American Major League Baseball catcher
- Gorham Munson (1896–1969), American literary critic
- Harry E. Munson (c. 1888–1946), Commissioner of the Los Angeles Police Department
- Henry G. Munson (1909–1975), United States Navy officer
- James Eugene Munson (1835–1906), American court stenographer and inventor
- Jim Munson (born 1946), Canadian Senator and journalist
- Joe Munson (1899–1991), American baseball player
- John Munson (born 1966), American musician
- John P. Munson (1860–1928), American zoologist
- Joyce Munson (1930–2010), American politician
- Kay Munson, American politician
- Kevin Munson (born 1989), American Major League Baseball pitcher
- Larry Munson (1922–2011), American sports announcer and talk-show host
- Letitia Munson (born c. 1820), African American herbalist and midwife
- Loveland Munson (1843–1921), Chief Justice of the Vermont Supreme Court
- Lyle Munson (1918–1973), American intelligence agent and book publisher
- Lyman E. Munson (1822–1908), Associate Justice of the Montana Supreme Court
- Nathan Munson (born 1974), English footballer
- Oliver Munson (1856–1933), American newspaper publisher, clerk, and politician
- Ona Munson (1903–1955), American film and stage actress
- Portia Munson (born 1961), American visual artist
- Red Munson (1883–1957), American baseball player
- Richard Munson, American author and clean energy advocate
- Ruth Munson (born 1958), American politician
- Samuel Munson (1804–1834), American Baptist missionary
- Scott Munson (born 1970), Canadian international soccer player
- Thomas Volney Munson (1843–1913), American horticulturalist and viticulturist
- Thurman Munson (1947–1979), American Major League Baseball catcher
- Warren Munson (born 1933), American film and television actor

Fictional characters:

- Eddie Munson, character in the Netflix Series Stranger Things
- Roy Munson, character in the film Kingpin
- Gwen Norbeck Munson, from the soap opera As the World Turns
- Hal Munson, from the soap opera As the World Turns
- Jennifer Munson Donovan, from the soap opera As the World Turns
- Old Lady Munson and Fiona Munson, female characters in the animated series Kid vs. Kat
- Munson, character in the film Flash Gordon

== See also ==
- Monson (surname)
