= Jean Hunhoff =

American politician (born 1953)

Member of the South Dakota Senate from the 18th district
- In office January 12, 2021 – January 14, 2025
- Preceded by: Craig Kennedy
- Succeeded by: Lauren Nelson

Member of the South Dakota House of Representatives from the 18th district
- In office January 13, 2015 – January 12, 2021 Serving with Mike Stevens (2015-2019), Ryan Cwach (2019-2021)
- Preceded by: Bernie Hunhoff
- Succeeded by: Mike Stevens

Member of the South Dakota Senate from the 18th district
- In office January 9, 2007 – January 13, 2015
- Preceded by: Garry Moore

Member of the South Dakota House of Representatives from the 18th district
- In office January 9, 2001 – January 9, 2007 Serving with Matt Michels (2001–2007)
- Preceded by: Donald E. Munson
- Succeeded by: Charlotte Gilson

Personal details
- Born: December 30, 1953 (age 72) Yankton, South Dakota
- Party: Republican
- Education: South Dakota State University; University of Nebraska Medical Center; University of Minnesota Medical School
- Profession: Registered nurse

Jean M. Hunhoff (born December 30, 1953) is an American politician who was a Republican member of the South Dakota Senate from 2021 to 2025. She also served in the South Dakota House of Representatives representing the 18th district from 2001 to 2007 and again from 2015 to 2021. She previously served in the South Dakota Senate from 2007 to 2015. Hunhoff was the mayor of Yankton from 1995 until 1997.

== Education ==
Hunhoff earned her BSN from South Dakota State University, her MSN from the University of Nebraska Medical Center, and her MHA from the University of Minnesota Medical School.

== Elections ==
=== South Dakota House of Representatives ===
- 2000 When House District 18 incumbent Republican Representative Donald E. Munson ran for South Dakota Senate, Hunhoff and incumbent Representative Matt Michels were unopposed for the 2000 Republican Primary and won the four-way November 7, 2000 General election where Representative Michels took the first seat and Hunhoff took the second seat with 4,279 votes (26.34%) ahead of Democratic nominees Adam Healy and Nick Braune.
- 2002 Hunhoff and incumbent Representative Matt Michels were unopposed for the June 4, 2002 Republican Primary and won the four-way November 5, 2002 General election where Representative Michels took the first seat and Hunhoff took the second seat with 4,699 votes (28.98%) ahead of Democratic nominees Scott Swier and Jay Blankenfeld.
- 2004 Hunhoff and incumbent Representative Matt Michels were unopposed for both the June 1, 2004 Republican Primary and the November 2, 2004 General election where Representative Michels took the first seat and Hunhoff took the second seat with 5,993 votes (46.61%).

=== South Dakota State Senate ===
- 2006 When District 18 incumbent Democratic Senator Garry Moore was term limited from remaining in the Senate and ran for a District 18 House seat, Hunhoff was unopposed for the June 6, 2006 Republican Primary and won the November 7, 2006 General election with 4,811 votes (54.61%) against Democratic nominee Curt Bernard.
- 2008 Hunhoff was unopposed for the June 3, 2008 Republican Primary and won the November 4, 2008 General election with 6,525 votes (66.94%) against Democratic nominee Bill Kerr.
- 2010 Hunhoff was unopposed for both the June 8, 2010 Republican Primary and the November 2, 2010 General election, winning with 5,915 votes.
- 2012 Hunhoff was unopposed for the June 5, 2012 Republican Primary and won the November 6, 2012 General election with 6,317 votes (65.13%) against Democratic nominee David Allen.

=== South Dakota House of Representatives ===
- 2014 Hunhoff was term limited from the South Dakota State Senate so she ran for the South Dakota House of Representatives again.
- 2016 Hunhoff secured another term by gaining the 2nd spot in the November 8, 2016, general election; Republican Mike Stevens received 6,296, Hunhoff received 5,393; Democrat David Allen received 3,047 and Democrat Peter Rossiter received 2,250 votes.
- 2018 Hunoff ran for reelection and secured the 2nd seat in the November 6, 2018, general election; Democrat Ryan Cwach received the most votes with 4,552 votes; Hunhoff received 4,444 votes; Republican Max Farver received 3,782 votes and Democrat Terry Crandall received 3,547 votes.

=== South Dakota State Senate ===
- 2020 Hunhoff ran for and was elected to the state Senate with 6,342 votes defeating Jordan Foos who received 4,255 votes.
