= Willard R. Espy =

American writer (1910–1999)

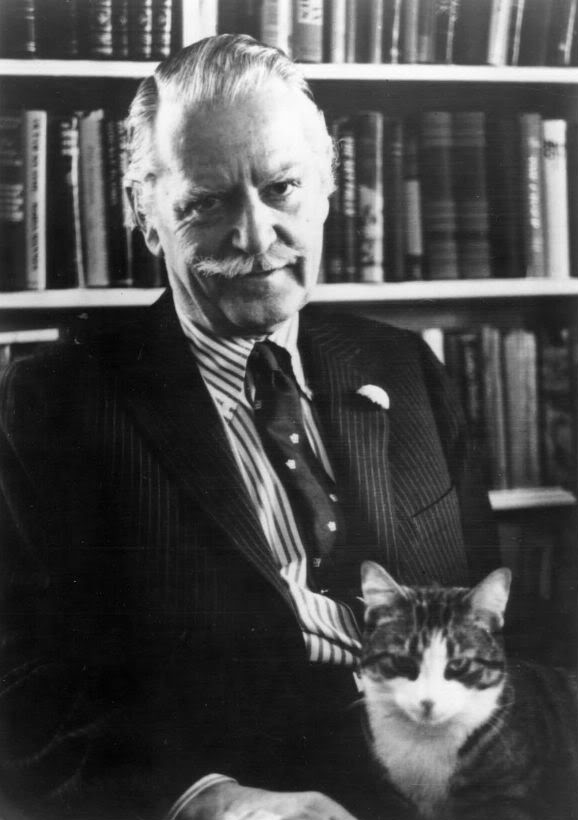
- Born: Willard Richardson Espy; December 11, 1910; Olympia, Washington, U.S.
- Died: February 20, 1999 (aged 88); New York City, New York, U.S.
- Resting place: Oysterville Cemetery, Washington, U.S.
- Education: University of Redlands
- Occupations: Writer; poet; philologist
- Spouses: Hilda Cole (m. 1940) Louise Manheim (m. 1962)
- Writing career
- Genres: Light verse; local history
- Notable works: An Almanac of Words at Play; Oysterville: Roads to Grandpa's Village

Willard Richardson Espy (December 11, 1910 – February 20, 1999) was an American editor, philologist, writer, poet, and local historian. Raised in the seaside village of Oysterville, Washington, Espy later studied at the University of Redlands in California before becoming an editor in New York City, as well as a contributor to Reader's Digest, The New Yorker, Punch, and other publications.

In the 1960s, he began publishing books on philology as well collections of poetry collections, and became the best-known collector of and commentator on word play of his time. In 1977, he published the national bestseller Oysterville: Roads to Grandpa's Village, a semi-autobiographical novel about his familial heritage in the Oysterville community. Espy died at New York Hospital in Manhattan in 1999, and was interred at Oysterville Cemetery.

== Early life ==
Espy was born in Olympia, Washington in 1910, the sixth of seven children, to Harry Albert Espy (1876–1959) and Helen Medora Espy (née Richardson; 1878–1954). His father, a one-time Washington state senator, was of Scots-Irish descent. His mother was from San Francisco, the daughter of a local preacher.

He and his siblings were raised in the coastal village of Oysterville, Washington, which had been founded in 1854 by his grandfather, R. H. Espy, a settler who arrived in Oregon Territory via The Oregon Trail. Espy later said, "there wasn’t much of anything to do but milk cows and read," and that he had "plodded through the Bible twice by the time I was eleven and "gobbled enough books to graduate from high school at fourteen." Espy graduated from the University of Redlands in 1930 with a B.A. after which he spent a year abroad, enrolling at the Sorbonne in Paris, planning to study philosophy.

== Career ==
Following his studies in Europe, Espy returned to the United States in 1932 and worked as a newspaper editor in California. In the 1930s, Espy became involved in anti-war and anti-fascist activism. He worked for the pacifist journal The World Tomorrow until in 1937 he became the representative of the American League Against War and Fascism in Washington DC, and the Washington correspondent for the US Marxist magazine the New Masses.

Espy moved to New York City, where he was hired by Reader's Digest in 1941. Espy spent the next sixteen years working for Reader's Digest in various positions, including as promotion director.

Espy's writing career took off in the late 1960s; he eventually authored fifteen books on language, and his poetry and articles regularly appeared in Punch, Reader's Digest, The Atlantic Monthly, The Nation, and Word Ways: The Journal of Recreational Linguistics. Espy earned praise from contemporary critics such as Louis Untermeyer and John Chancellor. Summarizing Espy's writing, critic Alistair Cooke wrote:

To Willard Espy the English language is what a football is to Joe Namath, a golf ball to Arnold Palmer, the male of the species to Zsa Zsa Gabor: a wonderful object to manipulate, to flog, to coax and have a barrel of fun with.

In 1963, Espy founded Charter Publishers to sell small, pocket-sized books condensed to about 17,000 words and priced at 25 cents, from vending machines across the city. The New Yorker reported that after the company's first year it was selling 13 titles from 350 vending machines, and averaging 1500 books sold daily.

=== Books and later career ===
Throughout the 1970s and 1980s Espy published books prolifically, and his works on wordplay include The Game of Words (1972) and the national bestseller An Almanac of Words at Play (1975), both of which were honored at the Governor's Writers Day Awards (now the Washington State Book Awards). His books include a lighthearted novel about a prolific but mysterious author, called The Life and Works of Mr. Anonymous (1977), an autobiography called Oysterville: Roads to Grandpa's Village (1977), the local Washington history texts Skulduggery on Shoalwater Bay (1998), and a pronunciation guide for local place names, Omak Me Yours Tonight (1973). He additionally contributed to publications such as The New Yorker. His contribution to The Book of Lists 2 (1980) named the "most beautiful words in the English Language" as gonorrhoea, gossamer, lullaby, meandering, mellifluous, murmuring, onomatopoeia, Shenandoah, summer afternoon, and wisteria. In his seventies, Espy sported a wing-tip mustache and white hair resembling Santa Claus, and was described in a 1982 Oregonian article as "a jolly old elf in spite of himself" who "'ho-hos' quietly before a typewriter in his apartment on New York City's Beekman Place".

== Personal life ==
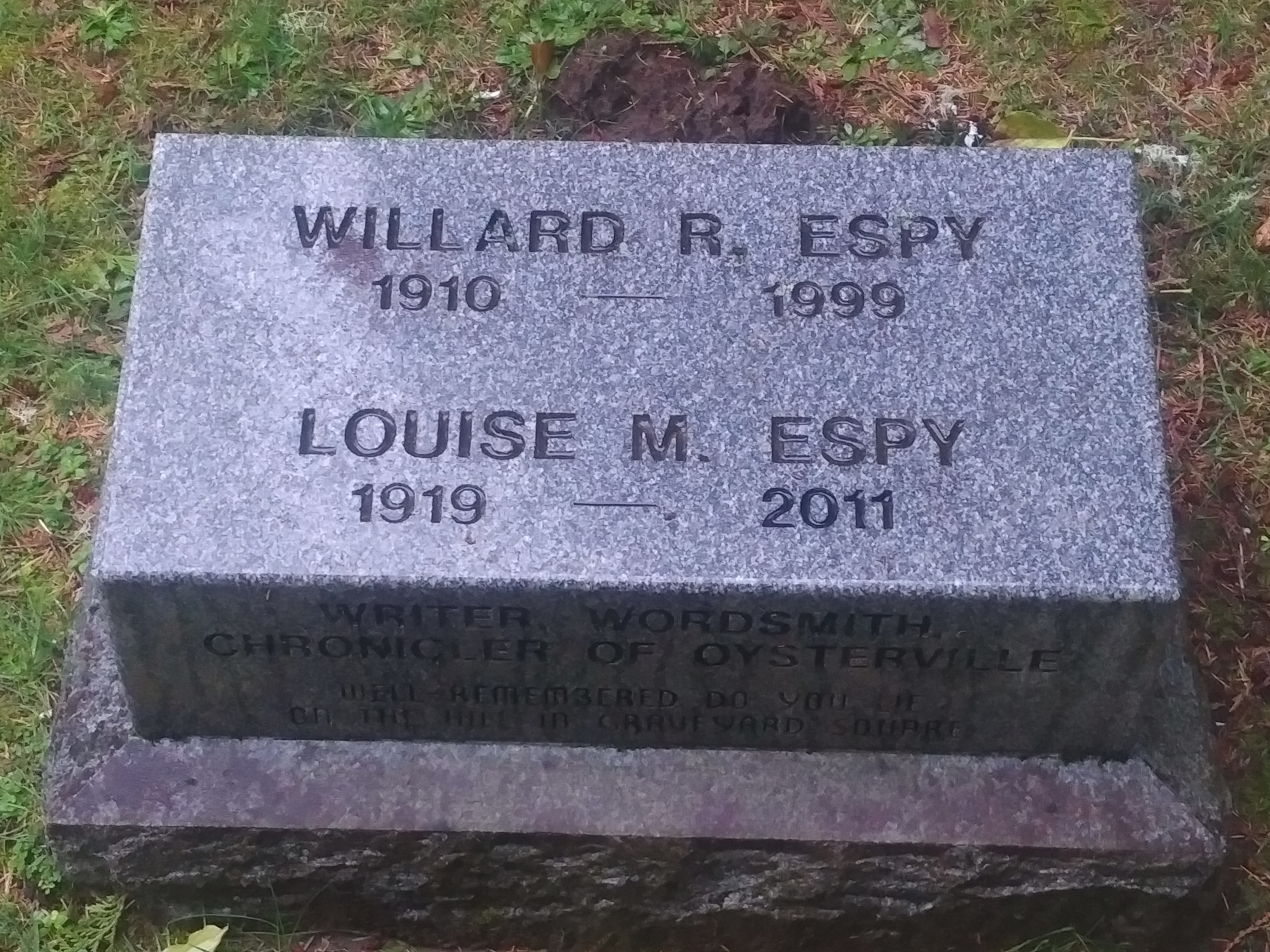
Espy's grave at Oysterville Cemetery

Espy married author Hilda S. Cole in 1940 and they divorced in 1961. They has a son and four daughters, including Freddy Plimpton (née Espy), who was married to the writer and The Paris Review editor George Plimpton from 1968 to 1988. His second wife was Louise Manheim Espy. He also had two stepchildren.

Espy died aged 88 at New York Hospital in Manhattan on February 20, 1999. He is buried in a family plot in Oysterville Cemetery. His wife Louise Espy, a native of New York, died in November 2011, and was buried beside him.

== Legacy ==
The Willard R. Espy Literary Foundation was established in 1997 as a non-profit organization based out of Espy's home in Oysterville, Washington, featuring a library of the author's personal collection of reference works and slang dictionaries. It served as a retreat space for artists and writers in the Pacific Northwest. The foundation, in partnership with the University of Redlands, awarded an annual prize to emerging memoir writers. In December 2010, the foundation officially closed.

Espy's light verse has been compared to that of Lewis Carroll, W. S. Gilbert, Ogden Nash and Cole Porter.

== Bibliography ==
- The Game of Words (1971) ISBN 0-7234-0173-X
- Oysterville: Roads to Grandpa's Village (1976) ISBN 0-517-52196-2
- The Game of Words (1972) ISBN 0-448-01196-4
- Omak Me Yours Tonight, or, Ilwaco million miles for one of your smiles: A Ballard of Washington State (1973) ISBN 0-9634294-1-8
- An Almanac of Words at Play (1975) ISBN 0-517-52463-5
- The Life and Works of Mr. Anonymous (1977) ISBN 0-380-45047-X
- O Thou Improper, Thou Uncommon Noun (1978) ISBN 0-517-53511-4
- Say it My Way: How to avoid certain pitfalls of spoken English together with a decidedly informal history of how our language rose (or fell) (1980) ISBN 0-14-005733-1
- Another Almanac of Words at Play (1981) ISBN 0-233-97288-9
- The Wars of the Words (1980)
- A Children's Almanac of Words at Play (1982) ISBN 0-340-34852-6
- Have A Word on Me: A Celebration of Language (1984) ISBN 0-671-25255-0
- Espygrams: Anagram Verse (1982) ISBN 0-517-54598-5
- Word Puzzles: Anagrams from America's Favorite Logophile (1983) ISBN 0-934878-31-5
- The Garden of Eloquence: A Rhetorical Bestiary (1983) ISBN 0-06-181256-0
- Espygrams II: 80 New Anagram Verses (1984) ISBN 0-517-54757-0
- Words to Rhyme With (1986) ISBN 0-8160-4313-2
- The Word's Gotten Out (1989) ISBN 0-517-07940-2
- Skullduggery on Shoalwater Bay (1998)
- The Best of An Almanac of Words at Play (1999) ISBN 0-87779-145-7

== Works cited ==
- Espy, Willard R. (1992) [1977]. Oysterville: Roads to Grandpa's Village. University of Washington Press. ISBN 978-0-517-52196-0.
