= Hunhoff =

Family name

Hunhoff is a surname. Notable people with the surname include:

- Bernie Hunhoff (born 1951), American politician
- Jean Hunhoff (born 1953), American politician
