= Craig Kennedy (politician) =

Member of the South Dakota Senate

Member of the South Dakota Senate from the 18th district
- In office January 10, 2017 – January 12, 2021
- Preceded by: Bernie Hunhoff
- Succeeded by: Jean Hunhoff

Personal details
- Born: September 28, 1951 (age 75) Huron, South Dakota, U.S.
- Party: Democratic
- Education: University of South Dakota; University of South Dakota School of Law
- Profession: Attorney
- Website: yanktonlawyers.com/craig-a-kennedy/

Craig A. Kennedy (born September 28, 1951) is an American politician who served as a Democratic member of the South Dakota Senate representing District 18 from January 10, 2017 through January 12, 2021.

== Early life and education ==
Kennedy was born in Huron, South Dakota. He earned his bachelor's degree at the University of South Dakota and his Juris Doctor at the University of South Dakota School of Law.

== Legal career ==
He started as a Judicial law clerk for the United States District Court for the District of South Dakota.

In 1977, he began his own law practice out of Yankton after a year as a U.S. District Court Law Clerk. Eight years later, he was elected as Yankton County's State Attorney, serving in that capacity for 7 years. From 2000 until his election in 2016 to the South Dakota Senate, he served as South Dakota's Special Assistant Attorney General.

Aside from his work as an attorney, he has filled the following positions: State Bar Commissioner, President of the USD Law School Foundation, South Dakota Defense Lawyers Association, South Dakota Chapter of the American Board of Trial Advocates, President of the Yankton Rotary Club, President of the Yankton Rotary Foundation and Board Member of the South Dakota Symphony as well as advisory committees for the City of Yankton and Yankton School District.

== Election history ==
2016: When incumbent Senator Democrat Bernie Hunhoff decided at the last minute against seeking reelection in order to spend more time with family, Kennedy submitted his petition for the office instead. Kennedy ran unopposed in the primary election on June 7, 2016. Republican Matt Stone had earlier entered the race as an Independent but after withdrawing, because South Dakota law does not allow the replacement of an Independent candidate, Kennedy was again unopposed in the November 8, 2016 general election. He earned 5,762 votes.

== Tenure ==
Kennedy is an advocate of universal pre-K education and was the cosponsor of a bill that would establish an early childhood education pilot program.

He was a member of the Senate Commerce and Energy Committee and the Senate Judiciary Committee.
