= Karla Lems =

American politician

Speaker pro tempore of the South Dakota House of Representatives
- Incumbent
- Assumed office January 14, 2025
- Preceded by: Mike Stevens

Member of the South Dakota House of Representatives from the 16th district
- Incumbent
- Assumed office January 10, 2023 Serving with Kevin Jensen
- Preceded by: David Anderson

Personal details
- Born: March 30, 1969 (age 57)
- Party: Republican

Karla J. Lems (born March 30, 1969) is an American politician. She has served as a member of the South Dakota House of Representatives from the 16th district since 2023, alongside Kevin Jensen. She is a member of the Republican Party.

South Dakota House of Representatives
Preceded by Mike Stevens	Speaker pro tempore of the South Dakota House of Representatives; 2025–present	Incumbent
