= Mike Stevens (South Dakota politician) =

American politician (born 1953)

Speaker pro tempore of the South Dakota House of Representatives
- In office January 10, 2023 – January 14, 2025
- Preceded by: Jon Hansen
- Succeeded by: Karla Lems

Member of the South Dakota House of Representatives from the 18th district
- Incumbent
- Assumed office January 12, 2021 Serving with Ryan Cwach
- Preceded by: Jean Hunhoff
- In office January 11, 2013 – January 8, 2019 Serving with Jean Hunhoff
- Preceded by: Nick Moser
- Succeeded by: Ryan Cwach

Personal details
- Born: January 24, 1953 (age 73)
- Party: Republican
- Education: Bethel University (BA); University of South Dakota (JD)

Mike Stevens (born January 24, 1953) is an American politician and a Republican member of the South Dakota House of Representatives representing District 18 since January 12, 2021. Stevens also served in the South Dakota House of Representatives from 2013 to 2019, where he was elected House Majority Whip on November 15, 2014. Stevens served as the chairman of the Judiciary Committee during his first tenure in the South Dakota House of Representatives. Stevens also served on the Yankton School Board for 21 years and was the former president of the South Dakota Trial Lawyers.

== Election history ==
- 2020 Stevens was elected with 6,778 votes; Ryan Cwach was also re-elected with 5,109 votes.
- 2016 Stevens was re-elected with 6,296; Jean Hunhoff was re-elected with 5,393 votes and David Allen received 3,047 votes and Peter Rossiter received 2,250 votes.
- 2014 Stevens was re-elected with 4,604 votes; Jean Hunhoff was also elected with 3,966 votes and Terry Winter received 2,672 votes and Jay Williams received 2,336 votes.
- 2012 When incumbent Republican representative Nick Moser left the Legislature and left a District 18 seat open, Stevens ran in the four-way June 5, 2012, Republican primary and placed second with 710 votes; in the four-way November 6, 2012, general election, incumbent Democratic representative Bernie Hunhoff took the first seat and Stevens took the second seat with 4,657 votes (26.21%) ahead of fellow Republican nominee Thomas Stotz and Democratic nominee Charlie Gross.

South Dakota House of Representatives
Preceded by Jon Hansen	Speaker pro tempore of the South Dakota House of Representatives; 2023–2025	Succeeded by Karla Lems
