= Oysterville, Washington =

Unincorporated community in Washington, United States

Oysterville
- Unincorporated community
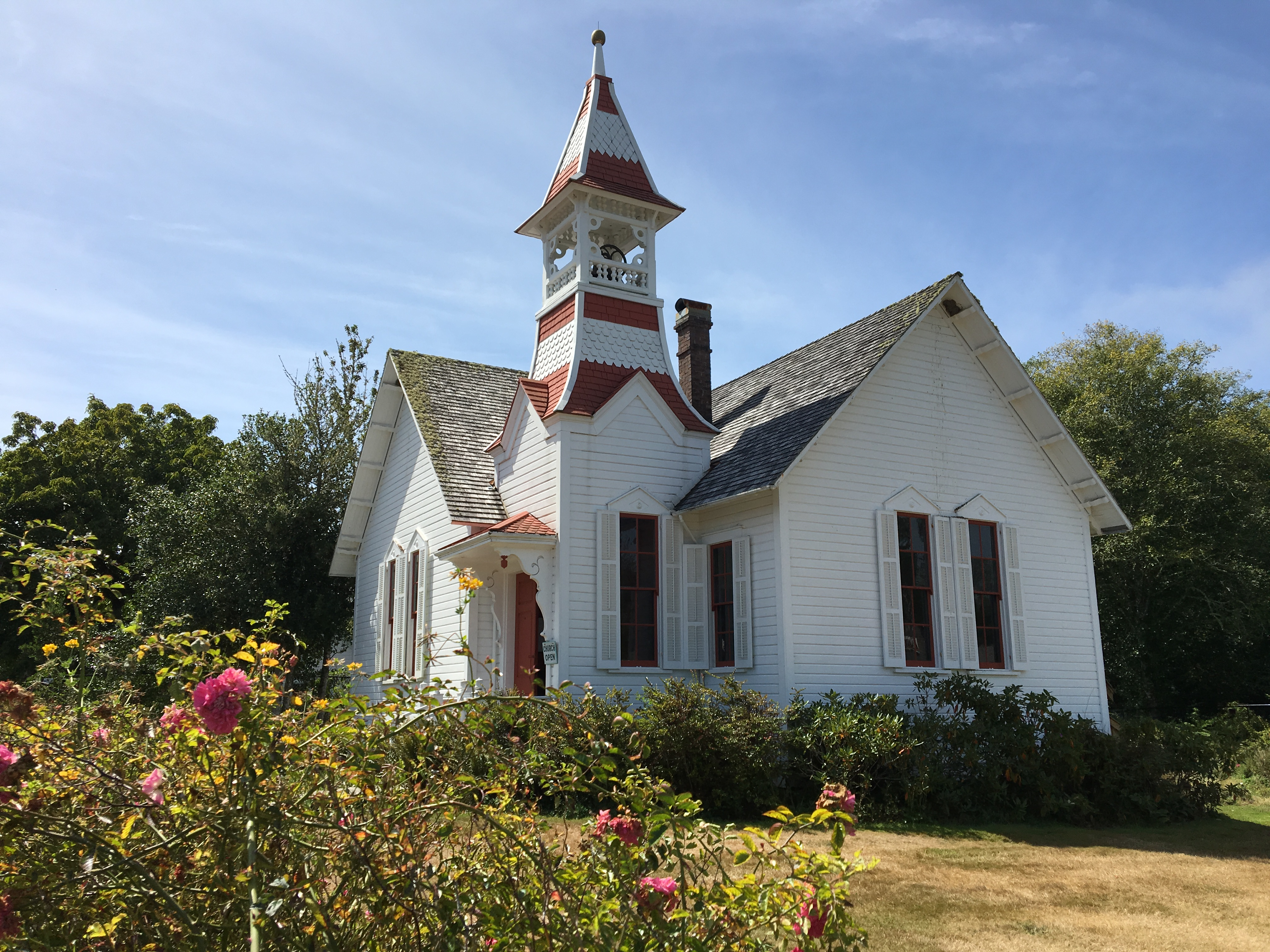
- Oysterville Church

- Location within the state of Washington Oysterville (the United States)
- Coordinates: 46°32′56″N 124°01′42″W
- Country: United States
- State: Washington
- County: Pacific
- Founded: 1854
- Elevation: 13 ft (4.0 m)

Population (2000)
  - Total: 20
- Time zone: UTC-8 (Pacific (PST))
  - Summer (DST): UTC-7 (PDT)
- ZIP Code: 98641
- Area code(s): 360, 564
- GNIS feature ID: 1512544

Oysterville is an unincorporated community located along Willapa Bay on the Long Beach Peninsula in Pacific County, Washington, United States. It is approximately 5 miles (8.0 km) from the city of Ocean Park, and 15 miles (24 km) from Long Beach. Founded in 1841 as an oyster fishing village, the community is registered on the National Register of Historic Places as the Oysterville Historic District. It currently has a population of about 20 residents.

== History ==
Before Oysterville was given its English name, it was the site of shellfish cultivation and harvesting by Indigenous people. John Douglas, who emigrated, was one of the first white men in the area. Oysterville was established and named in 1854 by J.A. Clark. It was a hub of oyster farming as the name suggests. It was the seat of Pacific County until the seat was relocated to South Bend in 1893.

In a county seat war, on February 3, 1893, all of the county records and books were stolen in order to move the county seat from Oysterville to South Bend, Washington. However, it had been agreed upon that the seat would be moved to South Bend. There is a sign telling the story of this incident across from the historic Oysterville school.

The town has several historic buildings, including a school house and historic homes, many built prior to 1880. Most of the buildings in this once prosperous town have been lost to the sea and the elements. Oysterville was placed on the National Register of Historic Districts in 1976 as Oysterville Historic District.

Just outside the town is the historic Oysterville Cemetery, which was begun in 1858 and contains plots for many of the area's founding families.

== Geography ==
Oysterville is located on the east side of the (north–south running) peninsula, on the shallow and sheltered Willapa Bay.

== Notable people ==
- Willard R. Espy, writer and philologist
- Clara C. Munson, first woman mayor of an Oregon city in the 20th century

== Gallery ==
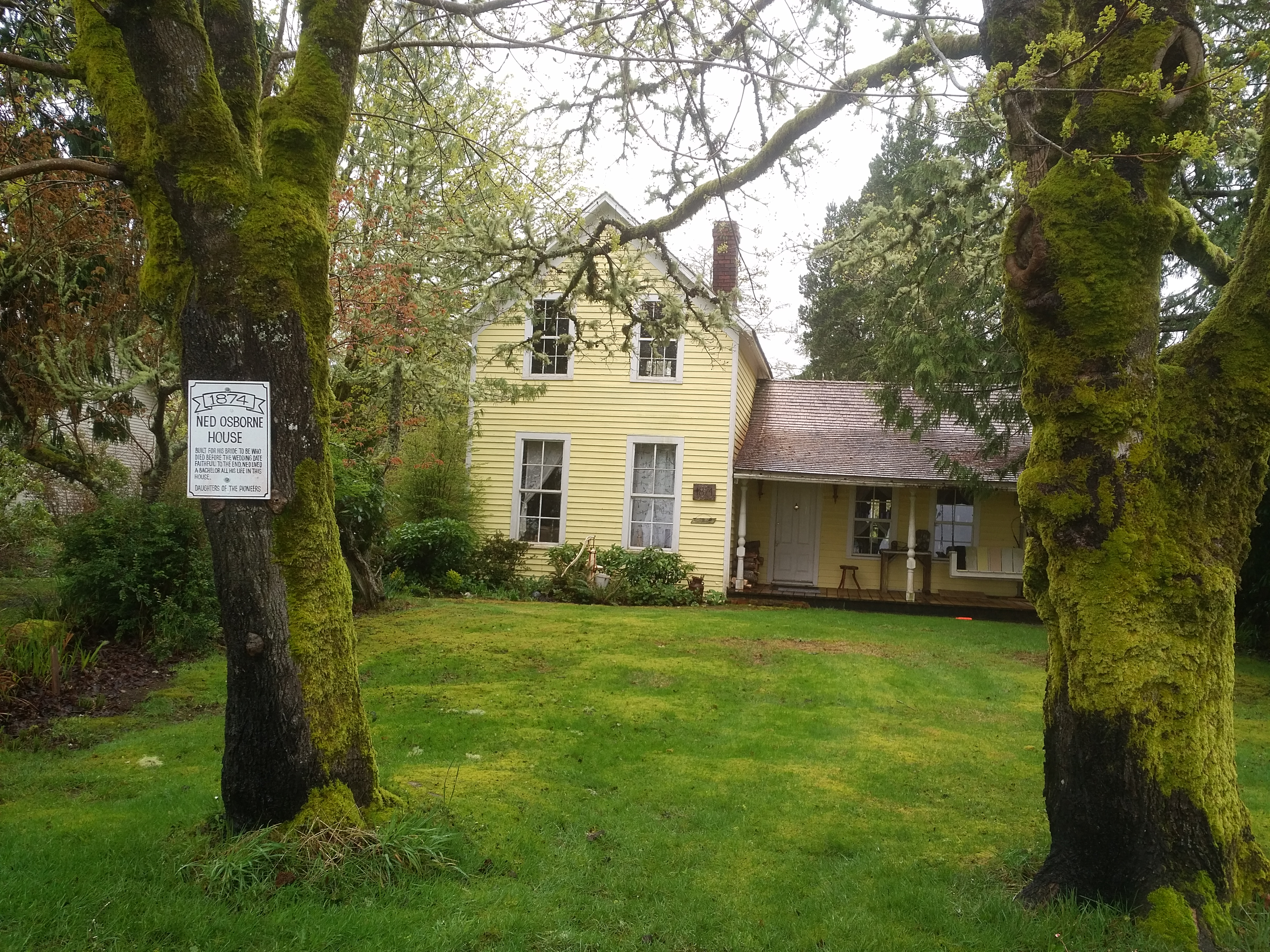
Ned Osborne House, built 1874

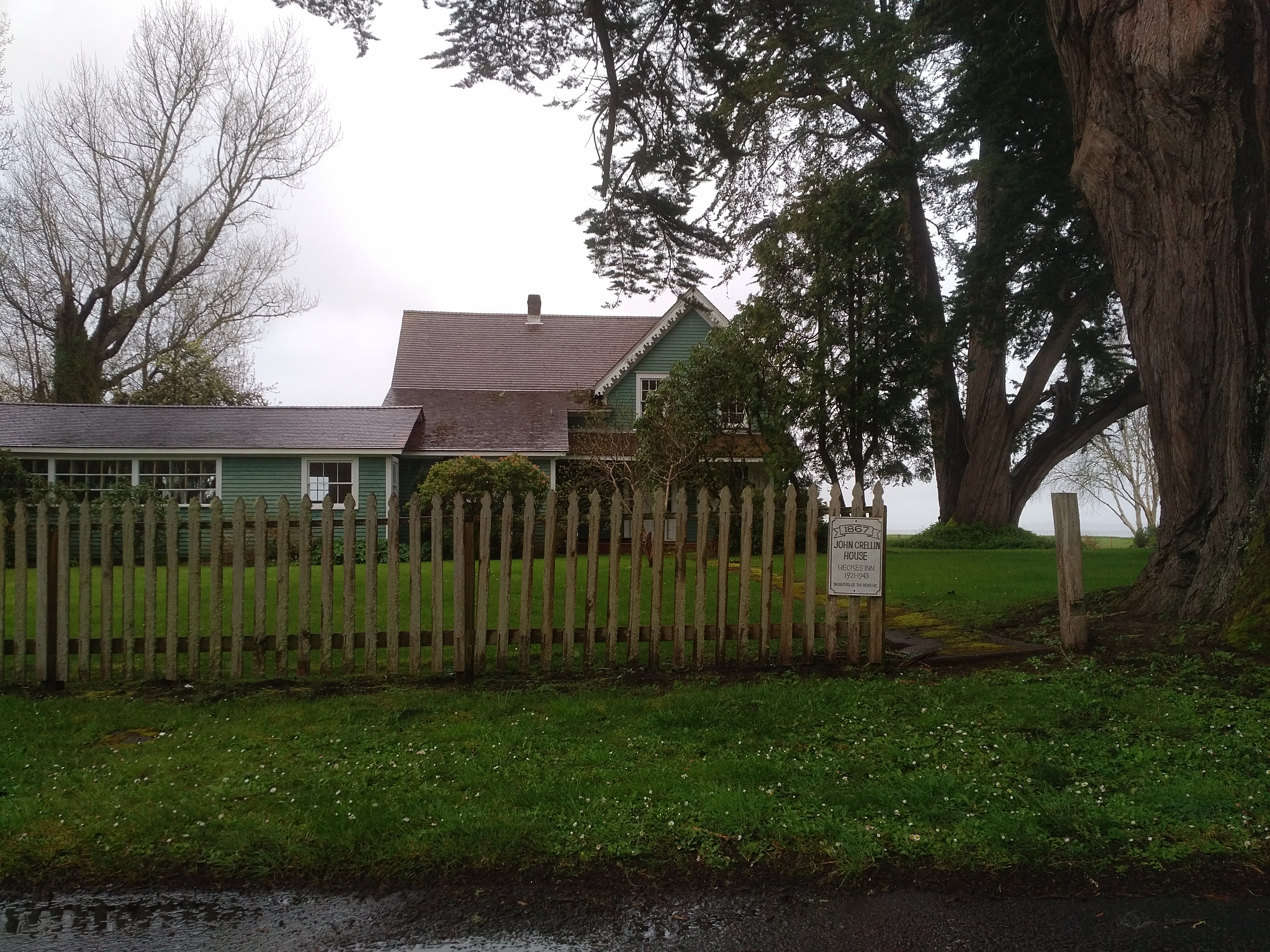
John Crellin House, built 1867

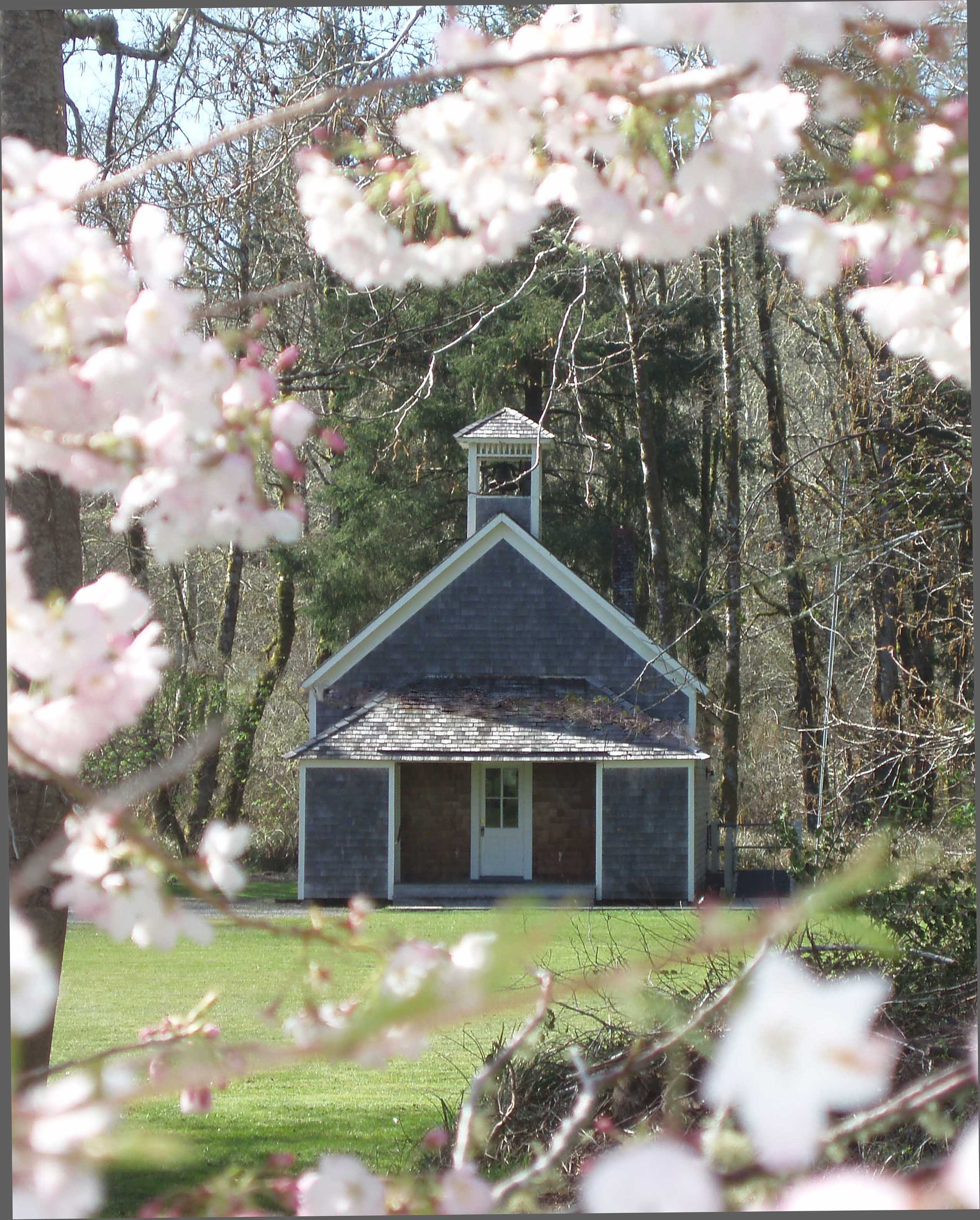
Schoolhouse

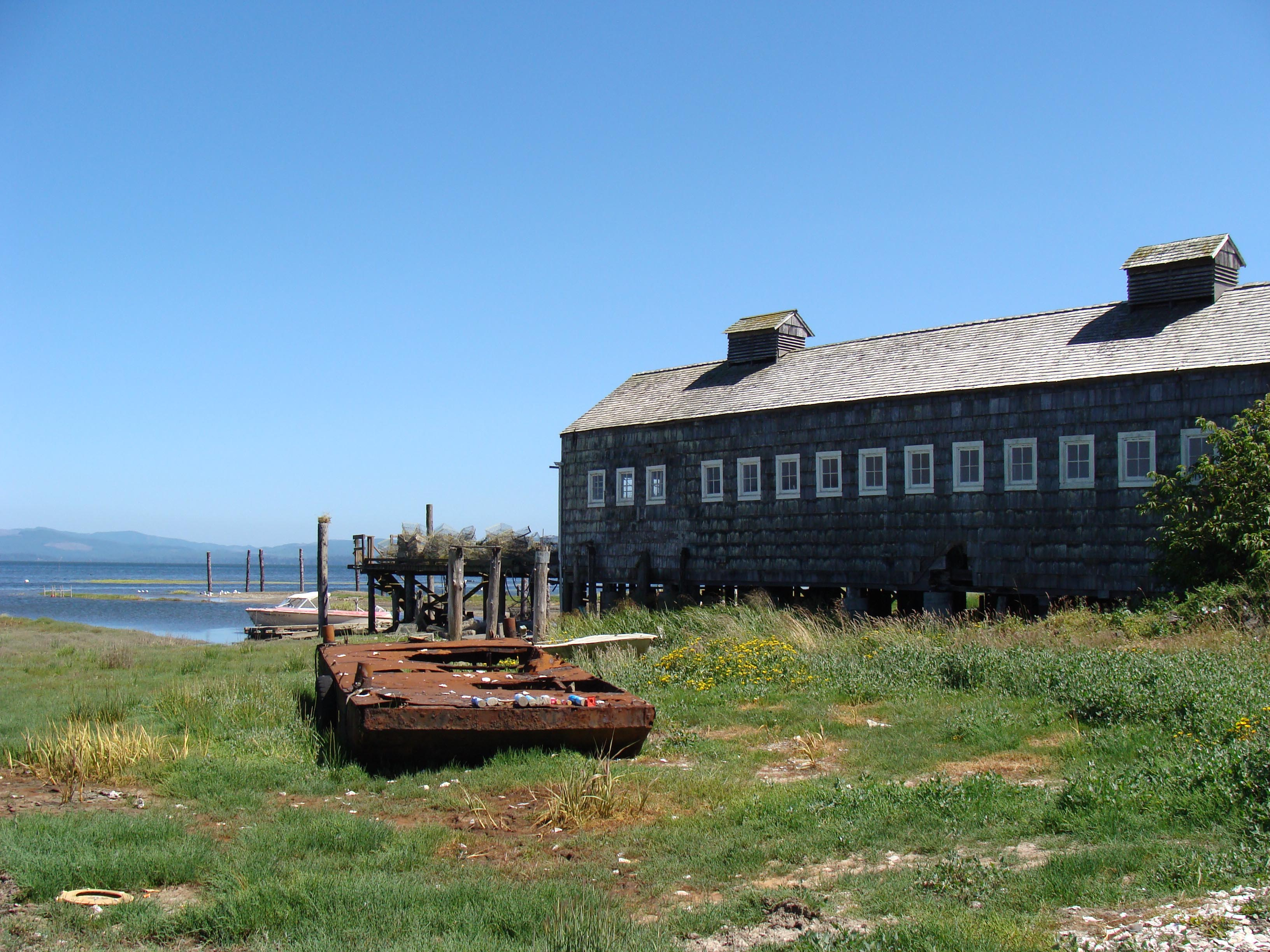
Willapa Bay from Oysterville
