= John P. Munson =

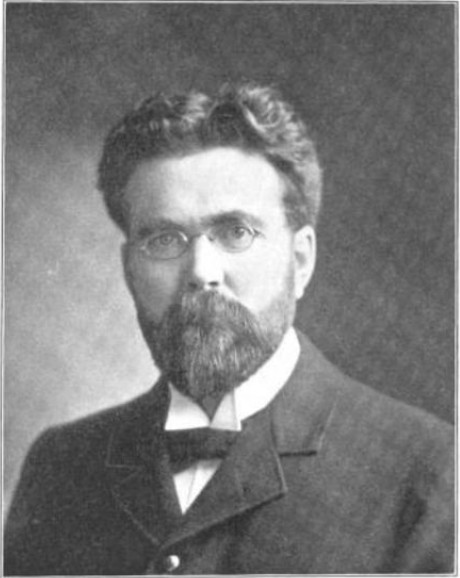
- Born: February 21, 1860; Jølster, Norway
- Died: February 27, 1928 (aged 68)
- Education: Yale, University of Chicago
- Scientific career
- Fields: Zoology
- Workplaces: Washington State Normal School, Ellensburg
- Thesis: The ovarian egg of Limulus; a contribution to the problem of the centrosome and yolk-nucleus (1897)

John P. Munson (February 21, 1860 – February 27, 1928) was a Norwegian-American zoologist and educator, known for his research in the development of animal egg and sperm cells, and his textbook Education Through Nature Study. He was professor at Washington State Normal School at Ellensburg (now Central Washington University) from 1899 to 1928, where he served as head of the department of biology.

== Early life and education ==
Munson was born in Jølster Municipality in Sunnfjord, Norway, the son of Peter and Elizabeth (Dvergsdal) Munson. At age four, his family emigrated to the United States, where Munson attended public schools in Shabbona, Illinois, before private preparatory schools. He attended Northwestern College (now North Central College) in Naperville and Milton College, Wisconsin before enrolling University of Wisconsin, from which he was graduated Bachelor of Philosophy, then did two years of graduate work in Yale University, chiefly in zoology, receiving a B.S. and M.S. degree. He was four years a fellow in zoology in the University Chicago, earning a PhD in 1897 with a study of the egg of the horseshoe crab (Limulus).

== Career ==
From 1889-91 Munson taught English at Lutheran Normal School in Sioux Falls, South Dakota, and from 91-93 taught Natural Science at the Wisconsin Academy 91-93.

He was made an honorary fellow in biology in Clark University, has been an investigator at the Marine Biological Laboratory, Woods Hole, Massachusetts and director of zoology at the University of Minnesota's Seaside Station on Vancouver Island, British Columbia, and was then a lecturer at the Puget Sound Marine Station. He joined the faculty of Washington State Normal School, Ellensburg in 1898. His research included gametogenesis (the formation of egg and sperm) in animals such as butterflies, turtles, and horseshoe crabs, as well as anatomy and behavior of marine organisms.

== Personal life ==
Munson married in Sioux Falls, South Dakota, December 30, 1897, Sophie Josephine, the daughter of Reverend Amund Mikkelsen, a fellow Norwegian immigrant and professor at Lutheran Normal School.

== Death and legacy ==
Munson died February 27, 1928, at the age of 68. A building at Washington State Normal School, Munson Hall, was named in his honor in 1932. After his wife died in 1944, nearly $74,000 from the Munson estate was donated to the Normal School to establish a scholarship fund.

== Works ==
- Education Through Nature Study: Foundations and Method. E. L. Kellogg & Co. 1903.

His monographs include:

- Munson, J. P. (1892). Anatomy and habits of Ophioglypha Sarsii with discussions of its relation to Stellerisea, and to other Ophiurans. University of Wisconsin, Madison.
- Munson, J. P. (1898). "The ovarian egg of Limulus: a contribution to the problem of the centrosome and yolk-nucleus". Journal of Morphology. 15 (2): 111–220. doi:10.1002/jmor.1050150202. hdl:2027/hvd.32044107166852. S2CID 85018588.
- Munson, J. P. (1904). "Researches on the oogenesis of the tortoise, Clemmys marmorata". American Journal of Anatomy. 3 (3): 311–348. doi:10.1002/aja.1000030307.
- Munson, J. P. (1906). "Spermatogenesis of the butterfly, Papilio rutulus". Proceedings of the Boston Society of Natural History. 33 (3).
- Munson, J. P. Observations on the generation and degeneration of sex-cells (Proceedings of the Seventh International Zoological Congress, Boston).
