= Kay Munson =

American politician

Kathryn M. Munson was a state legislator in Colorado. A Republican, she represented El Paso County, Colorado in the Colorado House of Representatives from 1969 to 1976. She is documented as having been Majority Caucus Chairman.
