= Ryan Cwach =

American politician

Member of the South Dakota House of Representatives from the 18th district
- Incumbent
- Assumed office January 5, 2018 Serving with Mike Stevens

Personal details
- Born: Yankton, South Dakota, U.S.
- Party: Democratic
- Spouse: Mallory Schulte
- Education: University of South Dakota (BA); University of Iowa (JD)
- Profession: Attorney

Ryan Cwach is an American politician and a Democratic member of the South Dakota House of Representatives representing District 18 since January 5, 2018.
