= Oysterville Cemetery =

Cemetery in Pacific County, Washington, US

Coordinates: 46.5476°N 124.0335°W

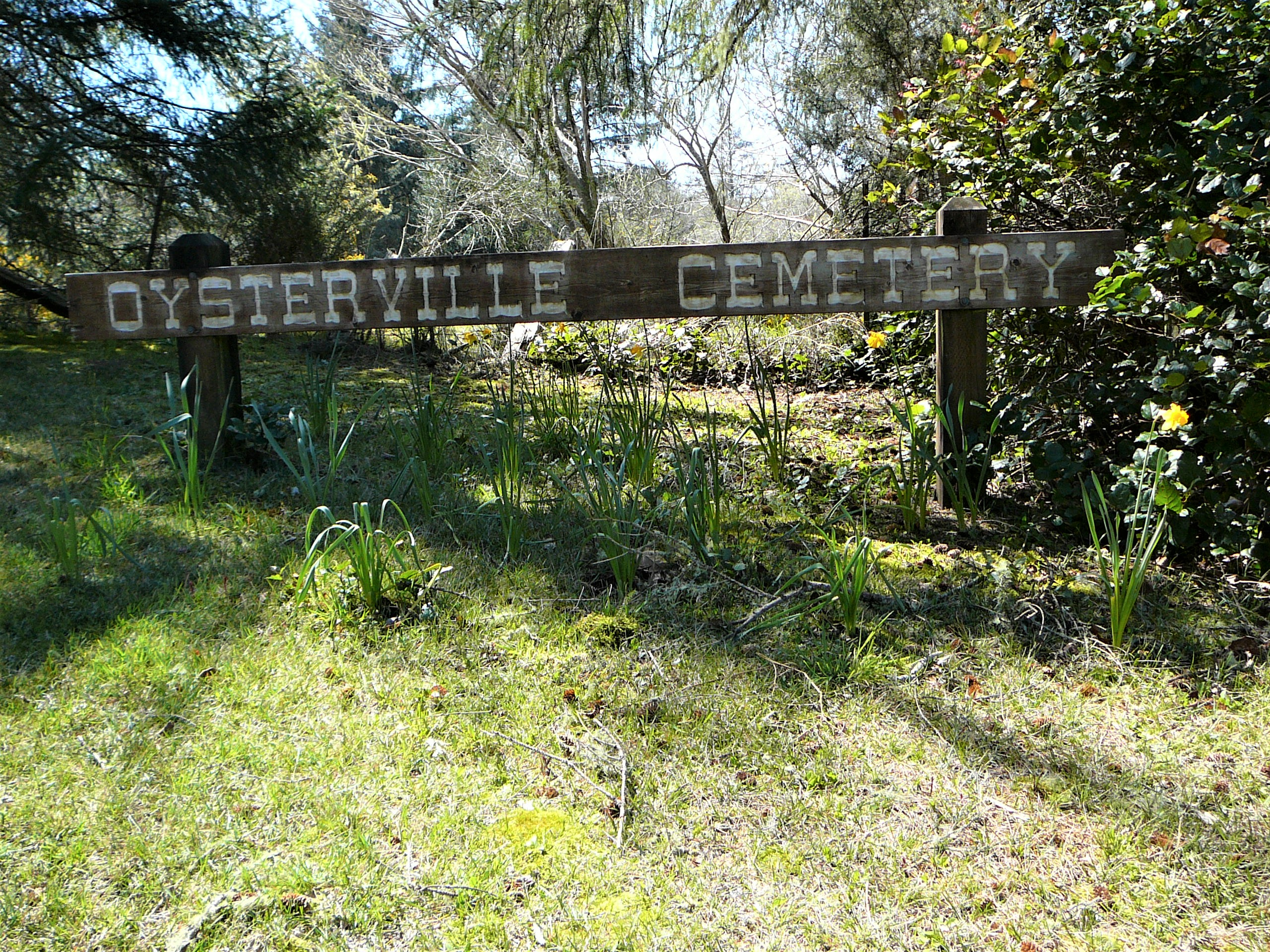
- Wooden sign for the Oysterville cemetery, on Cemetery Road
- Interactive map of Oysterville Cemetery

Details
- Established: 1858
- Size: 2 acres (0.81 ha)

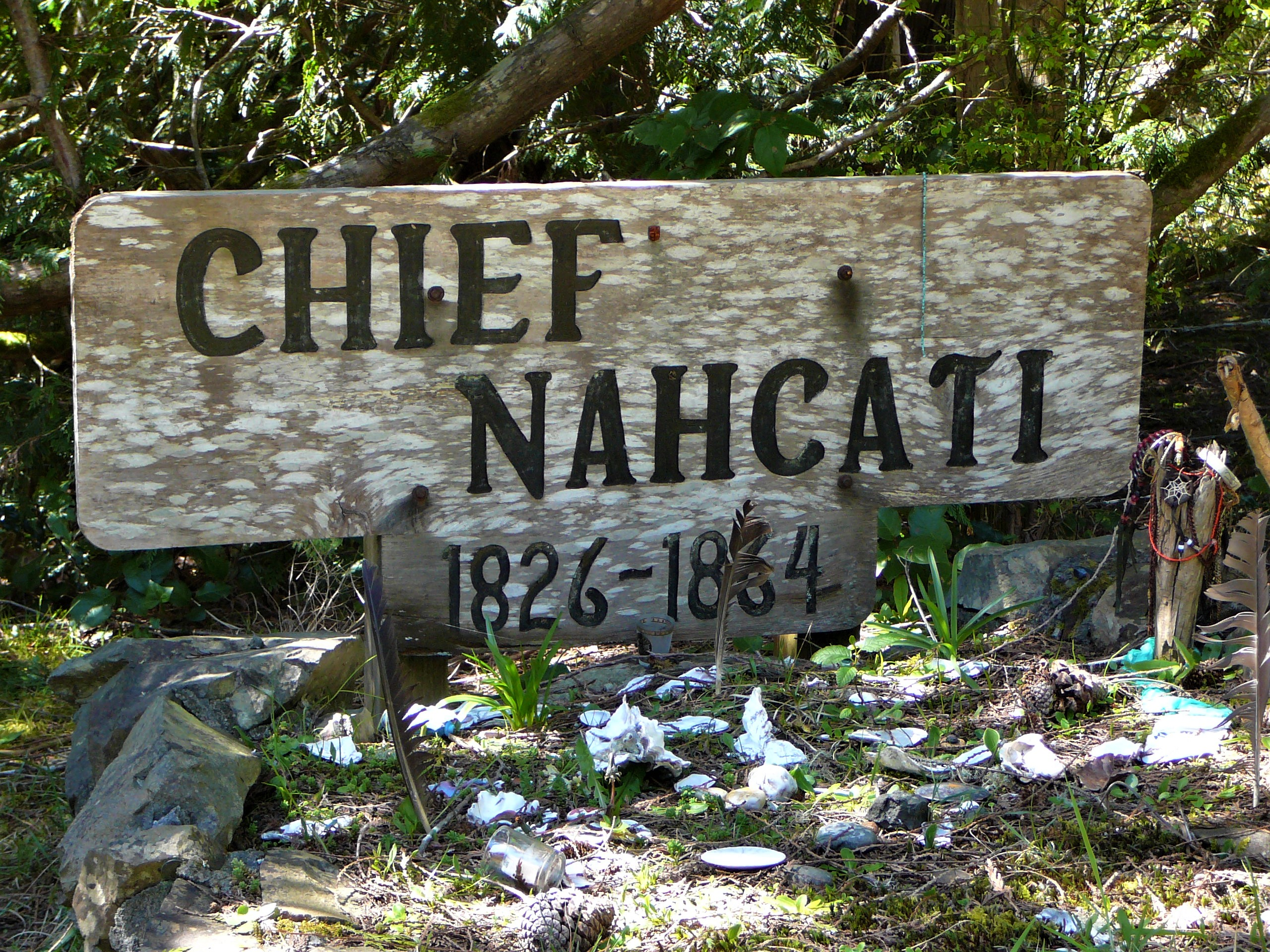
Chief Nahacati's grave in the Oysterville cemetery

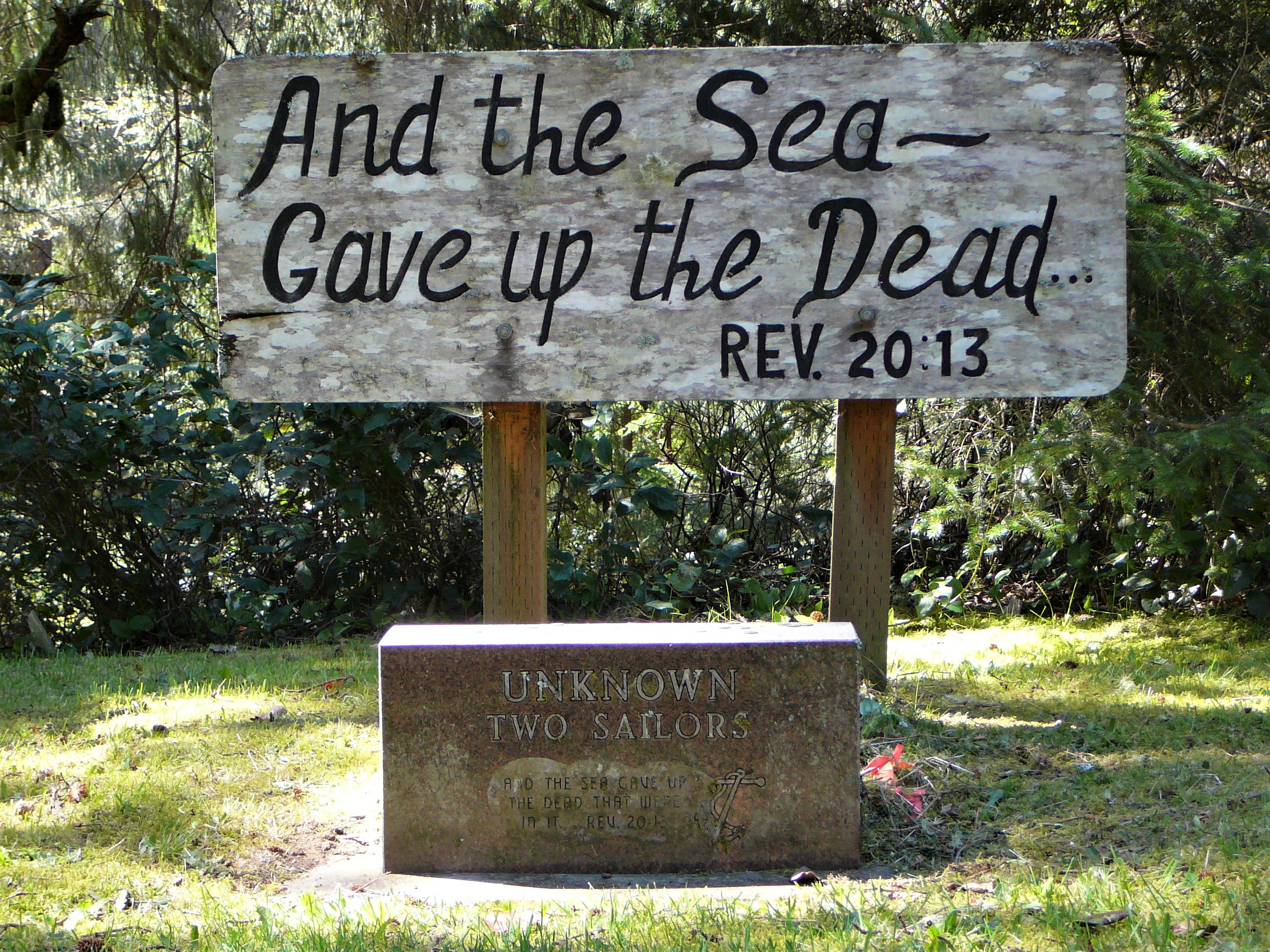
Grave marker for two unknown sailors buried in the Oysterville Cemetery

Oysterville cemetery, one of the oldest cemeteries in Washington State, began in 1858 on land owned by F.C. Davis. Located about a quarter of a mile outside the historic gold-rush boom town of Oysterville, this 2-acre cemetery holds plots for many of the founding families of the area. The history hidden in the headstones of this historic cemetery tells the tale of the Shoalwater Bay Tribe that lived in the Shoalwater Bay region; the first pioneers that came, drawn by the oyster industry; their descendants; and countless lives lost in the treacherous mouth of the Columbia, the Graveyard of the Pacific. A memorial to the last Native American chieftain of the Long Beach peninsula sits just to the right of the entrance, and a wooden sign with a marble headstone honors the unknown sailors lost at sea with the beginning of Revelation 20:13, "And the sea gave up the dead".

== History ==
The original acre territory of the Oysterville cemetery was originally purchased from F.C. Davis in 1890 for $100 by the Oysterville Cemetery Association. However, the land had been used as the town's burial ground for over 30 years at that point. This territory was later expanded in 1979 by a half-acre donation from the Espy family, and now houses the new section of the cemetery. The cemetery holds many descendants of the two founders of Oysterville, the Espy and Clark families, as well as members of many of the early settler families of the area. The earliest death date in the cemetery is 1851, three years before the town of Oysterville was founded. This grave belongs to John Carruthers, who was not originally buried in the cemetery, but transferred there by his brother Roberts so he could be buried with his father, mother, and brother. The cemetery is located near a Native American burial ground, and though there is a grave for Chief Nahcati of the Chinook, located in the northwest corner of the cemetery, it is thought that he is actually buried farther west on Bud Goulter's farm. There is also record of the last Native American princess of the area, Myrtle Jane Johnson Woodcock, being buried in plot 67. She was the great granddaughter of Chief Uhlahnee of the Chinook band at Celilo Falls, and great granddaughter of Chief Hoqueem of the Quinault tribe. There is also a grave for John Douglas, the first American settler on Shoalwater Bay, but it is uncertain if he is actually buried there. The current graves of both John Douglas and Chief Nahcati were built by Boy Scout Troop 44 under the direction of Herman Eberhardt, whose grave is built in a matching style.

== Management ==
The Oysterville Cemetery has been managed by the Oysterville Cemetery Association since 1890. The current Oysterville Cemetery Association Board of Trustees is composed of Chester (Tucker) Wachsmuth, president; Charles Wachsmuth, vice president; Charlie Talbott, secretary/treasurer; and Gordon Andrews, trustee. The transfer of power to the current management occurred on January 15, 2017. Past president Ron Biggs transferred responsibilities to the current president Tucker Wachsmuth, and secretary Sydney Stevens transferred responsibilities to Kitt Fleming. The cemetery association works to maintain the cemetery and keep records of burials, deeds, and plot information. General maintenance is often done on a volunteer basis, however, the volunteers are usually members of the board of trustees. Interments at the Oysterville Cemetery are handled by Penttila's Chapel by the Sea with payments directly to the Oysterville Cemetery. The funeral home handles burials and tombstone placement, and the Cemetery Association marks the placements. The Cemetery accepts both full body and cremated remains.

== Cemetery map ==
The original linen map of the Cemetery measures 2 feet wide by 8 feet long, but current president Tucker Wachsmuth "scanned the old map, cleaned it up, added the names in print form, cut it up into the nine sections and added the key."

== Gallery ==
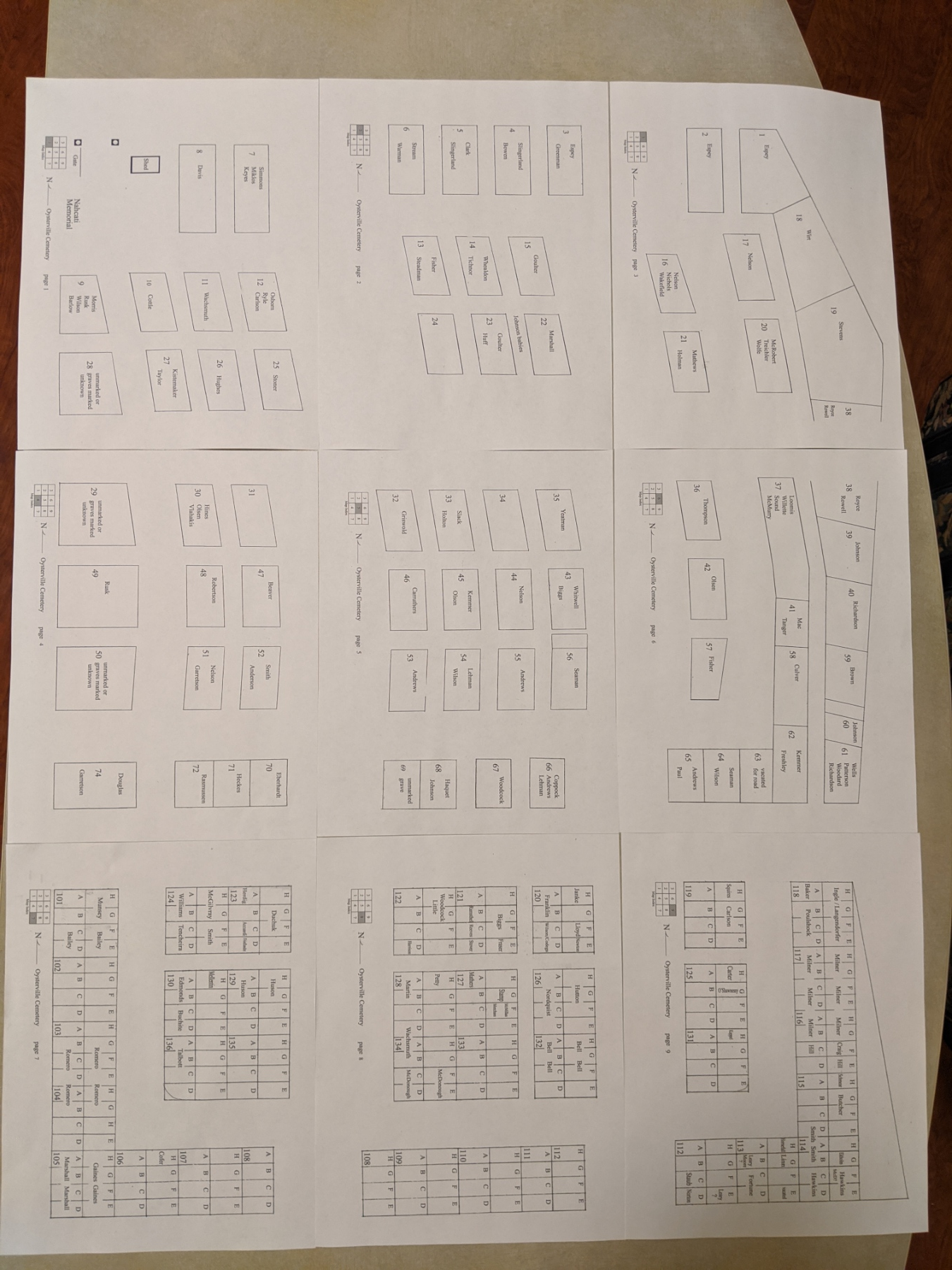
All nine sections of the cemetery map

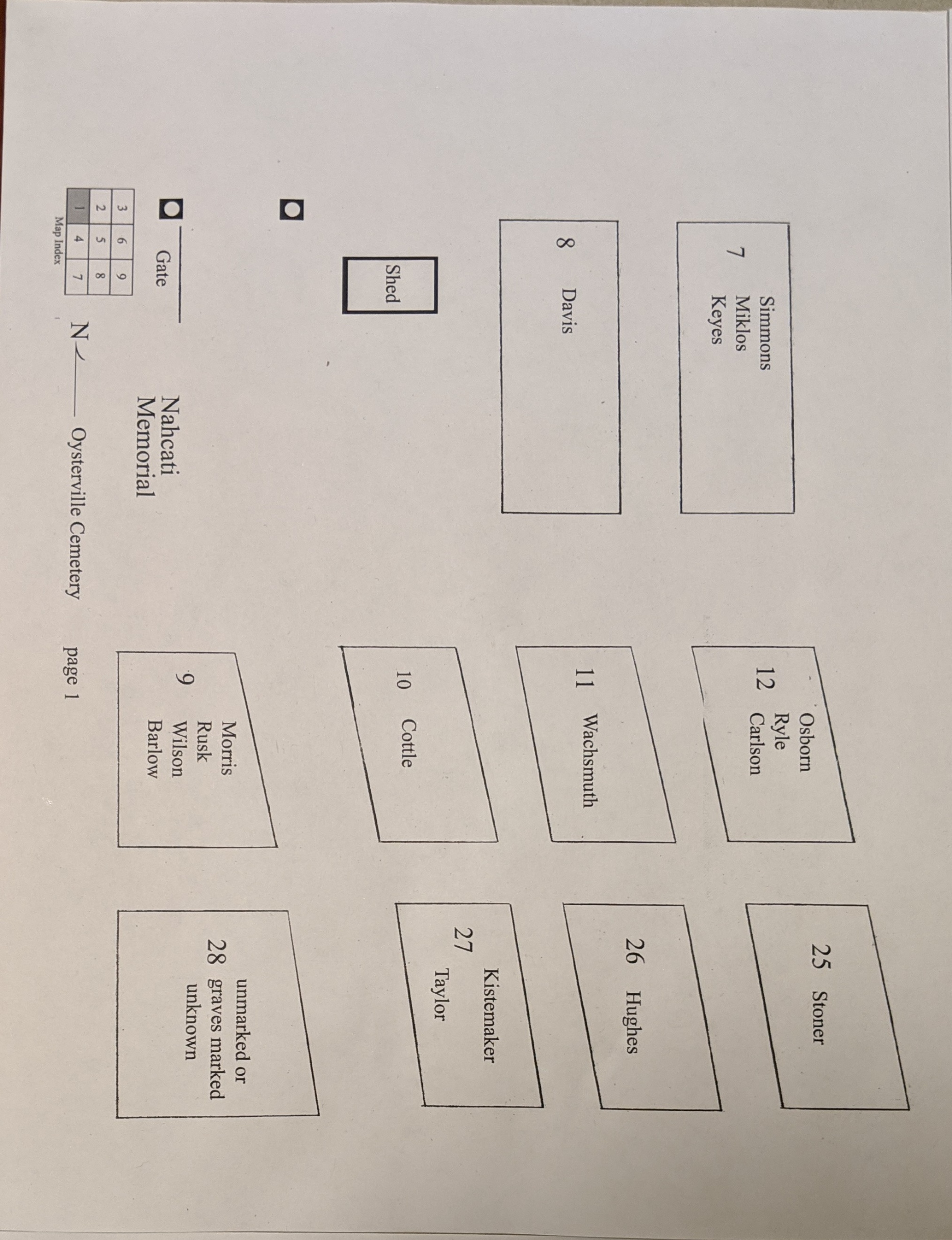
First section of the cemetery map

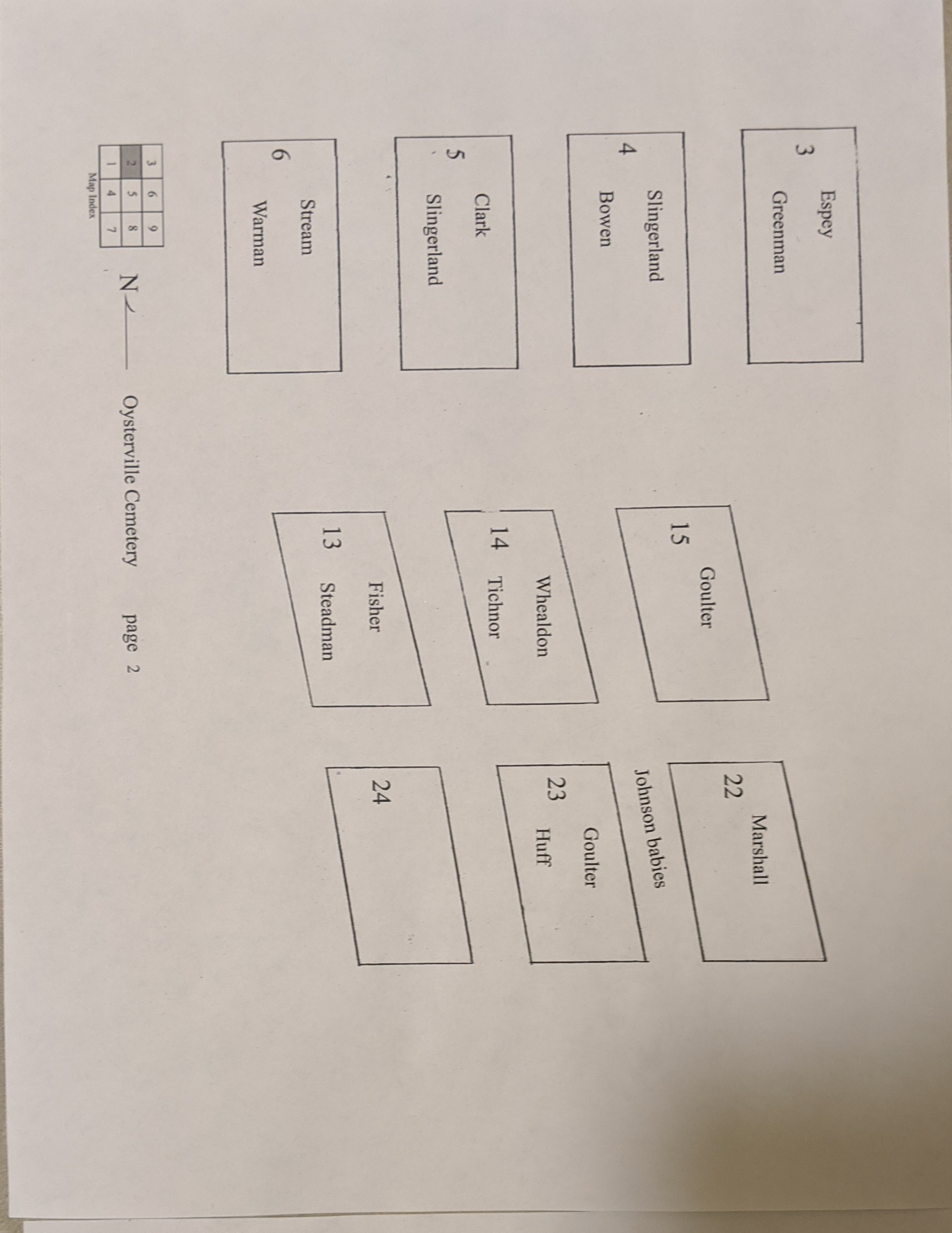
Second section of the cemetery map

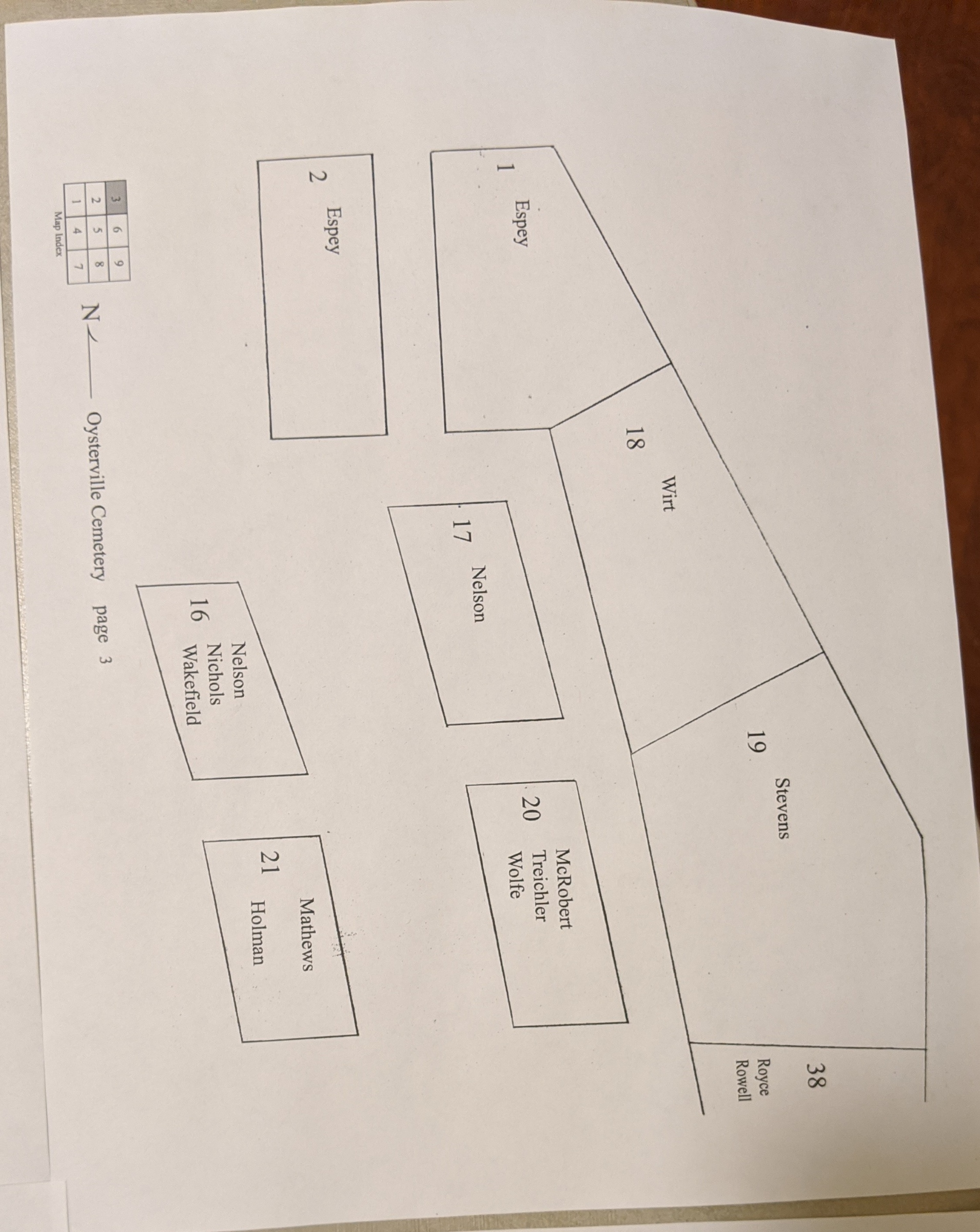
Third section of the cemetery map

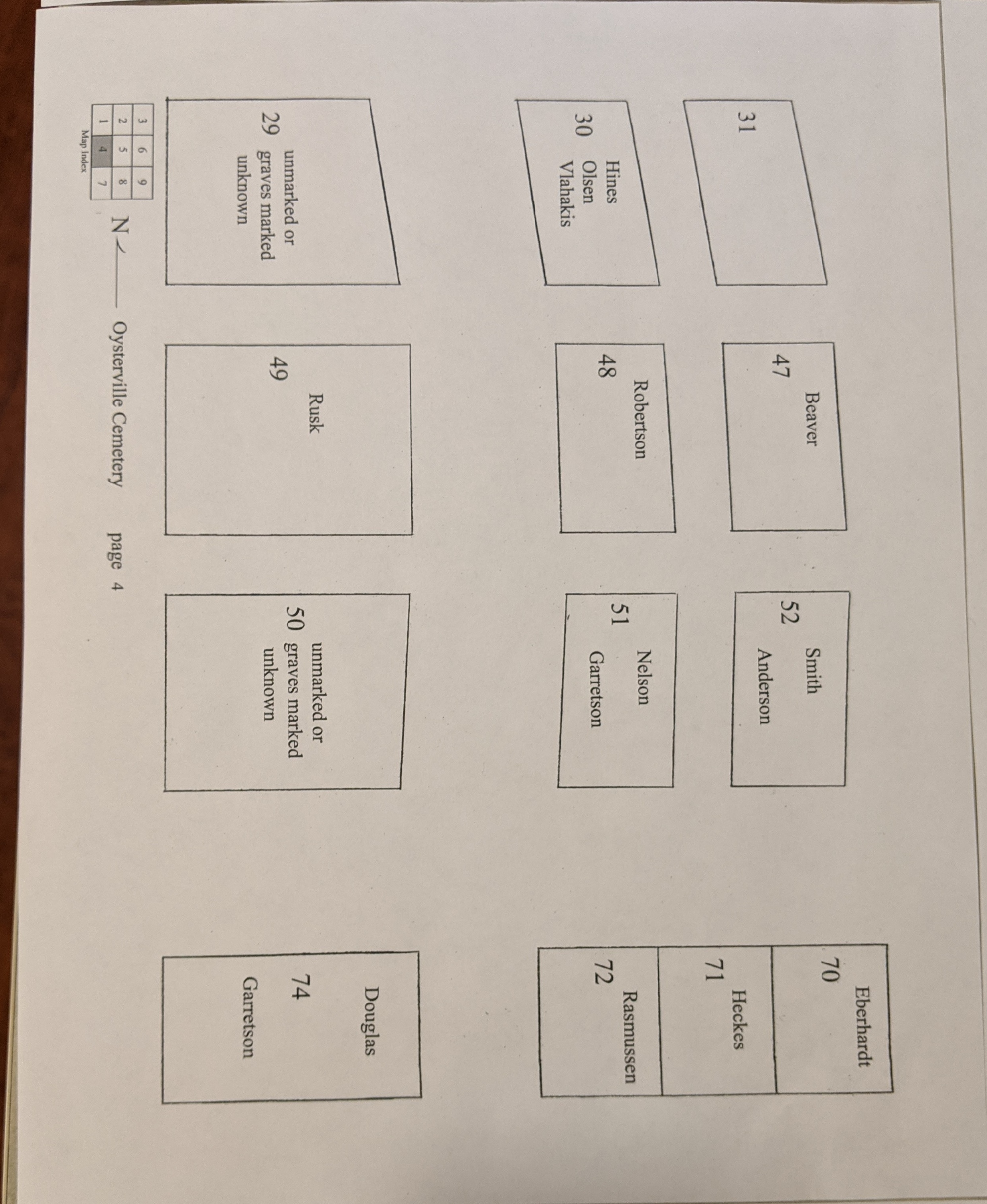
Fourth section of the cemetery map

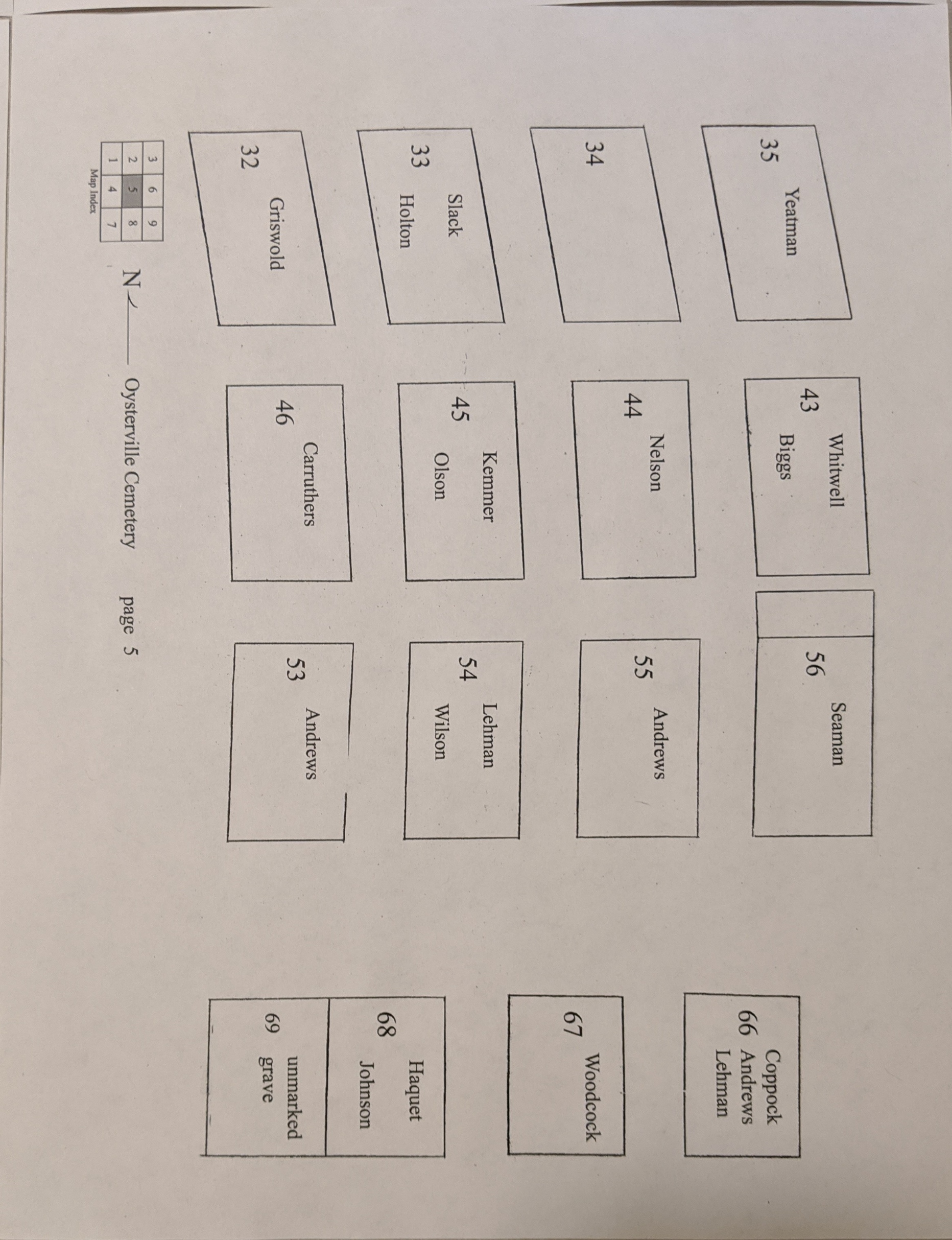
Fifth section of the cemetery map

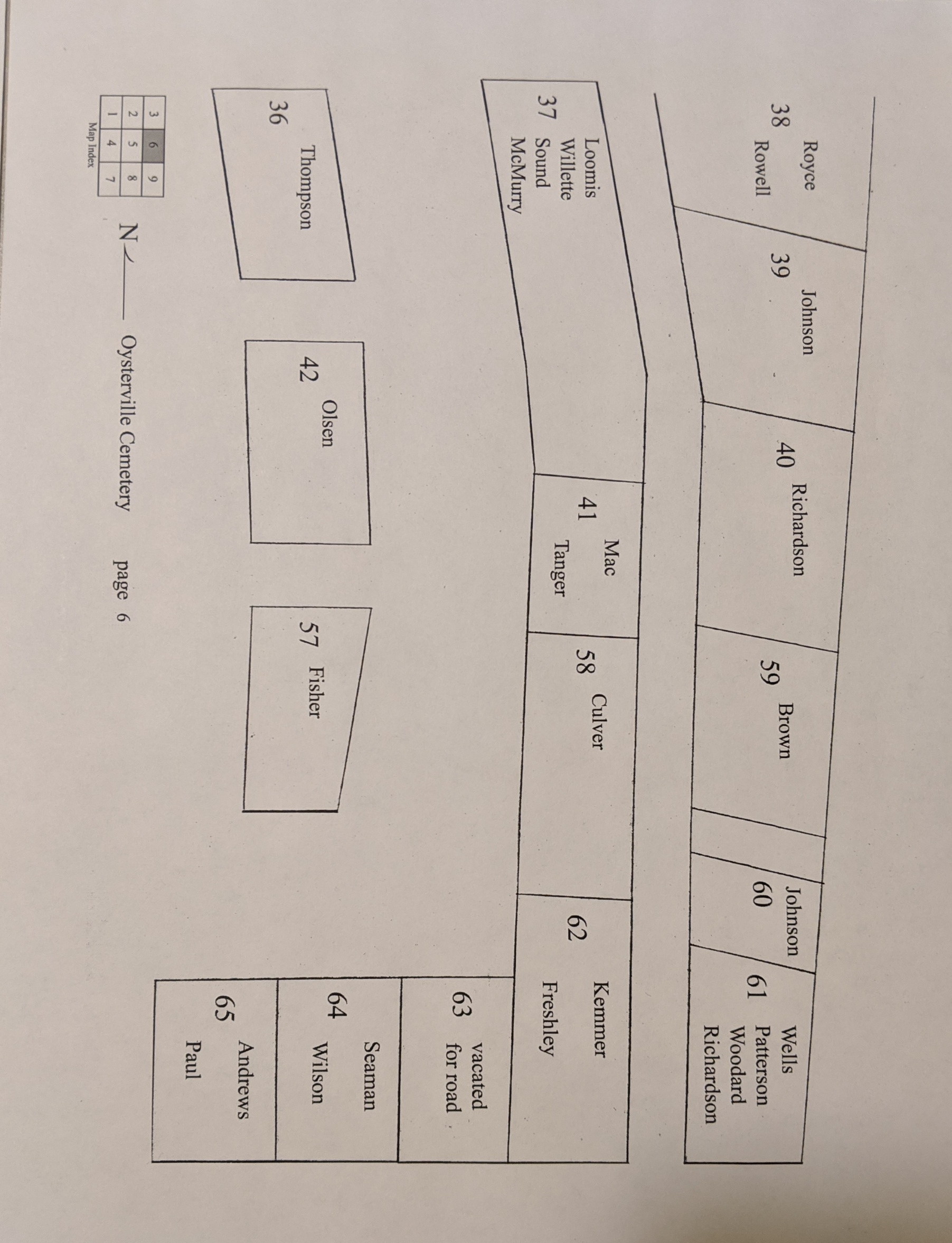
Sixth section of the cemetery map

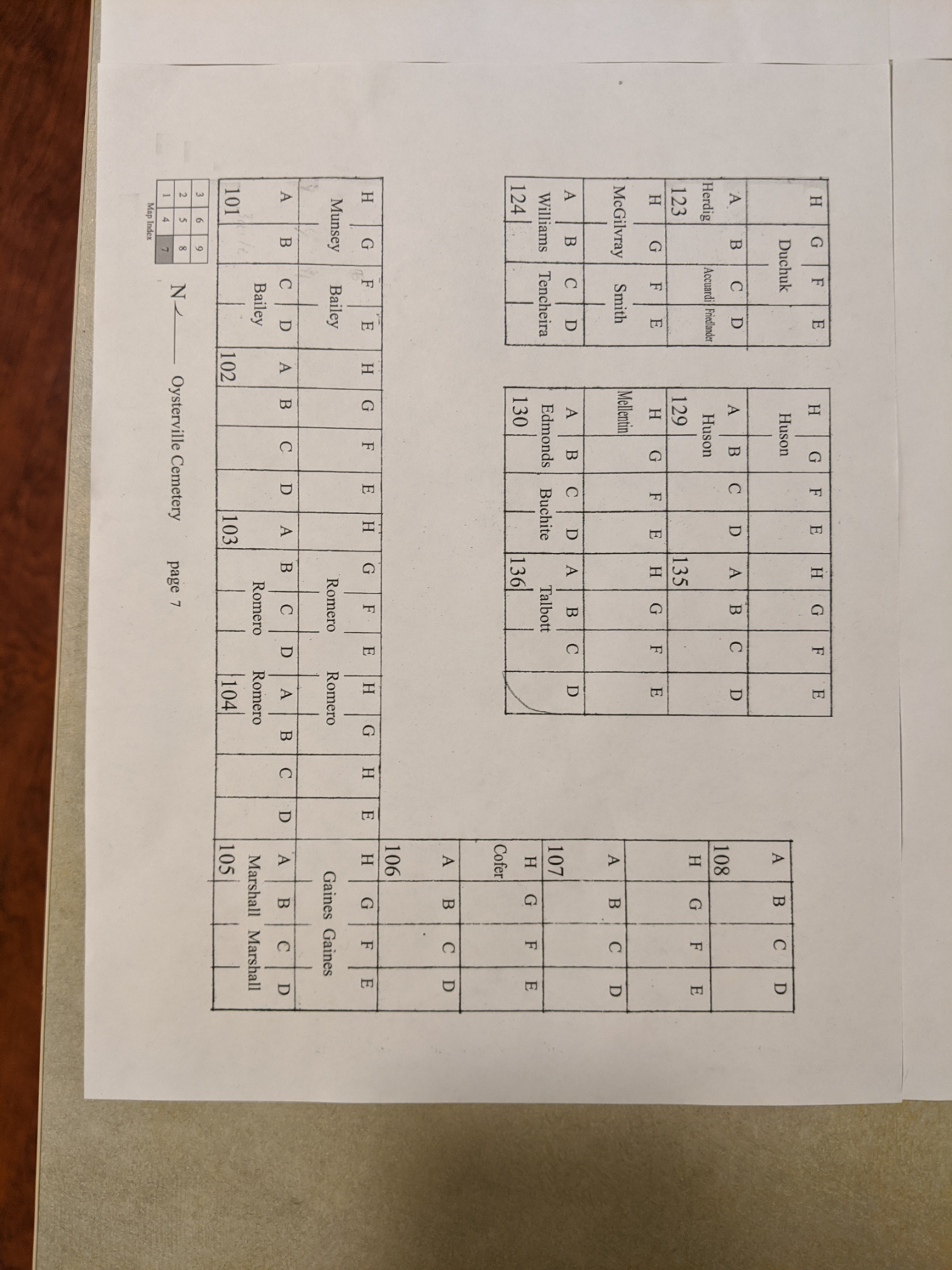
Seventh section of the cemetery map

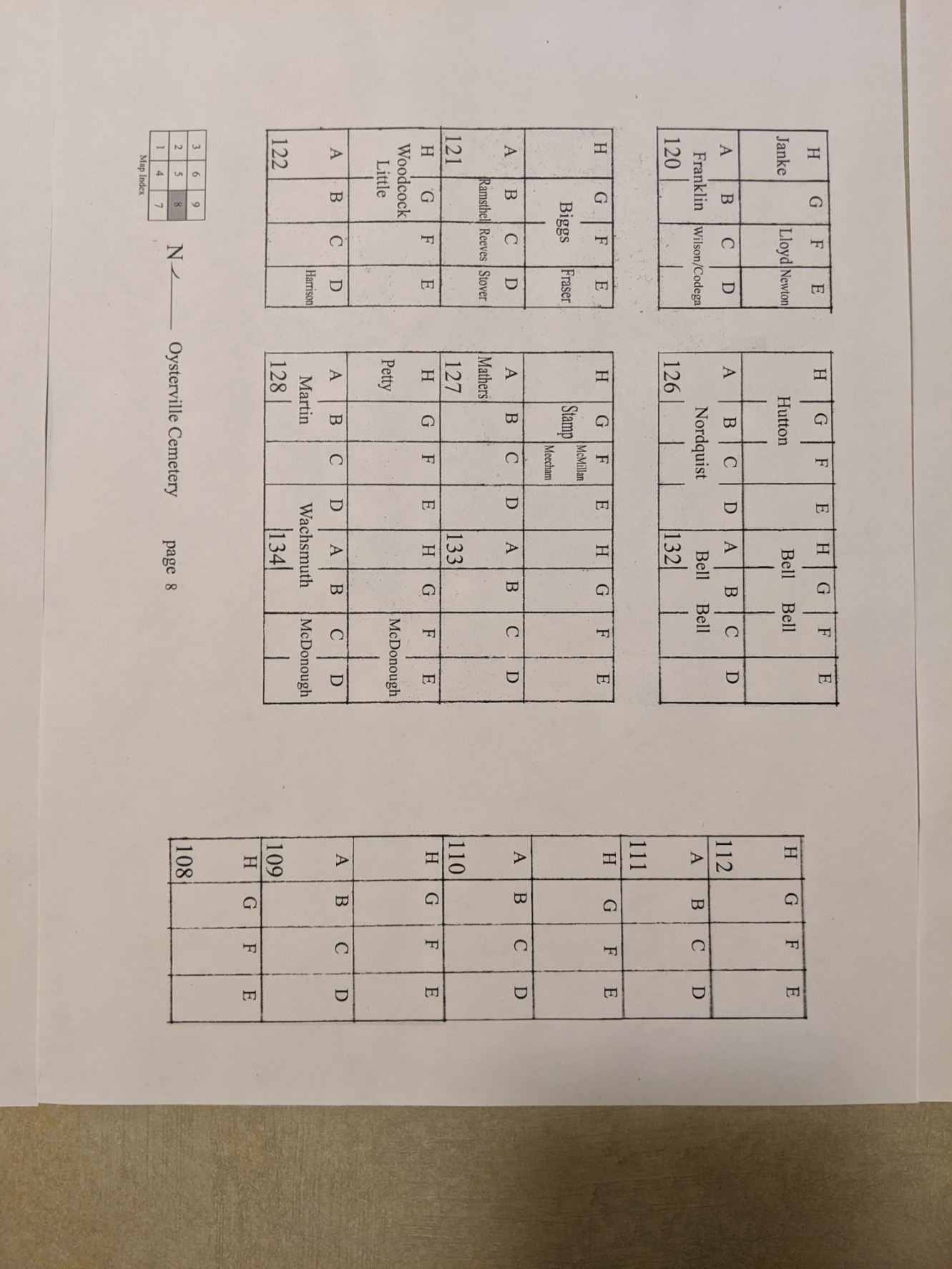
Eighth section of the cemetery map

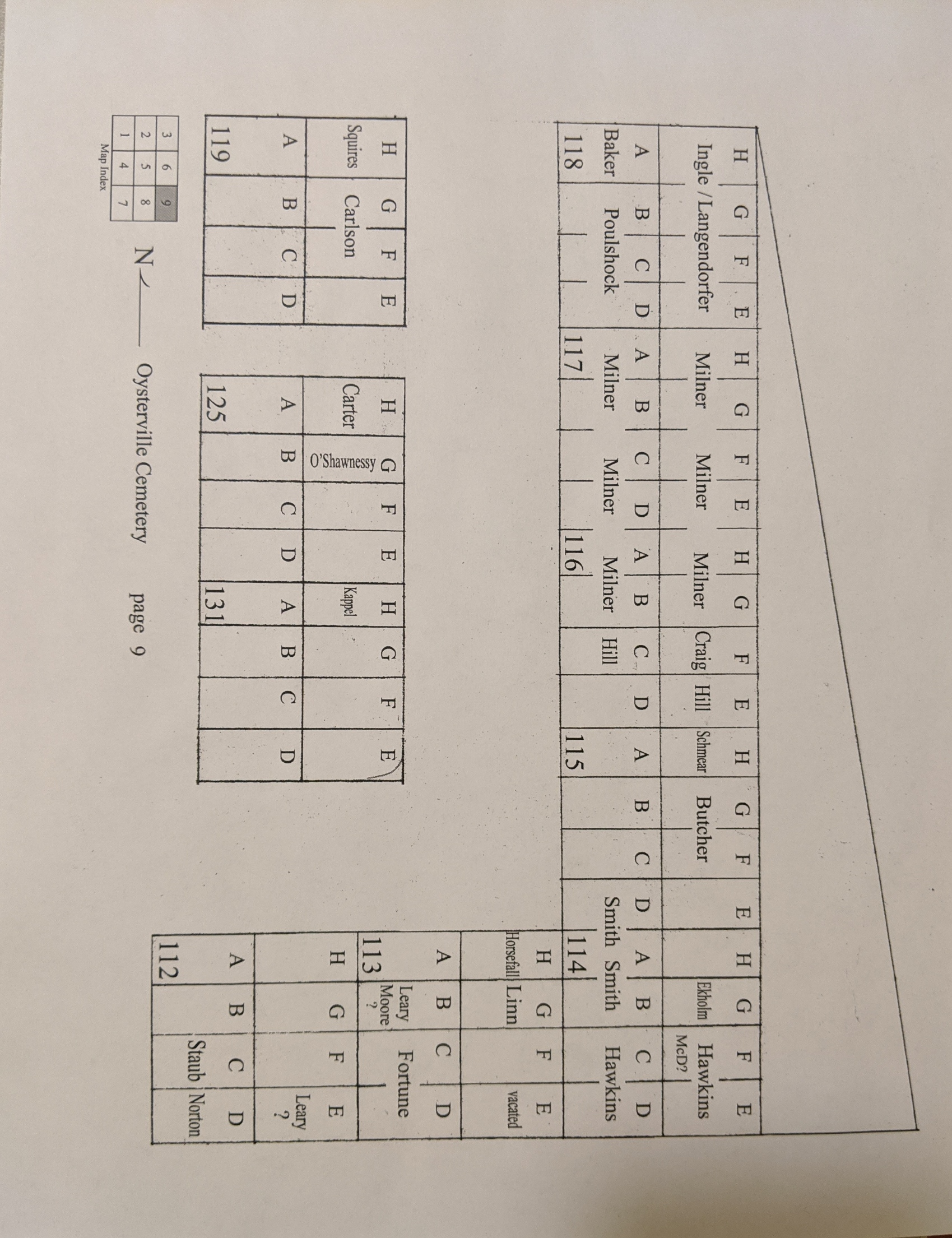
Ninth section of the cemetery map
