= Clara C. Munson =

American politician

Clara Cynthia Munson
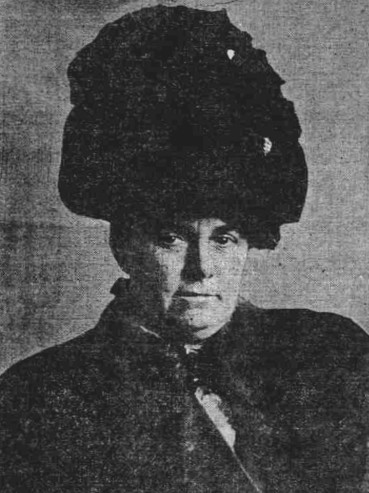
- Munson in 1913

Mayor of Warrenton, Oregon
- In office 1913–1914
- Succeeded by: George Schmitz

Personal details
- Born: June 16, 1861 Oysterville, Washington
- Died: October 19, 1938 (aged 77) Oregon
- Party: Republican
- Occupation: school clerk

Clara Cynthia Munson (June 16, 1861 – October 19, 1938) was an American politician who served as mayor of Warrenton, Oregon, and was the first woman elected mayor in Oregon during the 20th century. Her term lasted one year (1913–14) before she was succeeded by George Schmitz.

== Biography ==
Clara Cynthia Munson was born on June 16, 1861, in Oysterville, Washington. Her father, Joel W. Munson, serviced the lighthouse at Cape Disappointment on the Washington side of the Columbia River near present-day Ilwaco. Munson witnessed the Industry crash on the Columbia River bar which resulted in the deaths of 17 of the ship's crew. Munson was unable to rescue the doomed seamen because the lighthouse was not equipped with a lifesaving boat. Later Munson worked at Point Adams Light. Clara Munson attended St. Helens Hall in Portland, Oregon, and graduated in 1880. Munson was an active member of the Daughters of Rebekah.

In 1900, Munson was involved in two cases before the Clatsop County Circuit Court, one in which she was the plaintiff against bartender James M. Gillette and the other in which Munson was the defendant being sued by Susan B. Henderson. The Henderson case was over a debt allegedly owed to Henderson by Byron Kimball, whose estate was being administered by Munson. According to Henderson, she applied to Munson for wages owed, but the request was denied. The jury returned a sealed verdict in favor of the plaintiff awarding Henderson $1,200 of the $2,500 she had sought.

In the May 18, 1904, edition of The Daily Astorian, Munson was described as "The Astorian's west side correspondent". In April 1908, she began her career in public service, temporarily acting as Warrenton's postmaster while Mrs. Denver, the town's regular postmaster, was on vacation.

Munson was nominated by the Citizens Ticket for Mayor of Warrenton during the town's 1912 municipal elections. Her opponent was J. W. Detrich, who was nominated as an independent candidate. Munson was the first woman to win elected office in Oregon following the state's suffrage law taking effect. One-third of the electorate during the Warrenton municipal elections were women. Munson took office on January 2, 1913. After Munson's victory she began to be erroneously labeled as the first woman elected mayor in Oregon by sources including The Oregonian, the East Oregonian and The Daily Astorian. However, Alice E. Burns was elected mayor of Florence, Oregon, in 1895, part of an all-female ticket that won election to five local offices but all of whom were prevented from taking office because of state law preventing women from holding elected office. The Oregonian reported on December 20, 1912, that congratulatory telegrams were sent to Munson from as far as New York. In addition to serving as mayor, Munson served as the school clerk for her district and was Warrenton's deputy postmaster.

While visiting Portland in January 1913, Munson was interviewed by The Oregonian which quoted her as saying, "It's lots of fun to be mayor. There are surprises constantly and the duties of the office are not onerous. I fully appreciate the honor, as Warrenton is a city healthy morally and financially and there is no necessity to probe for graft or start a vice crusade. We are free from debt and it is mutually understood that we will incur no liabilities until the money is in sight to meet them. In my first message to the [Warrenton City] Council, I advocated the organization of a fire department, which will be carried out, and appointed an auditor, marshal and dyke inspector, but withheld the appointment of city attorney as it is a useless expense. [...] In politics I have been a Republican all my life, but if I had a vote at the last presidential election I would have done as many of my male friends did and voted for [Woodrow] Wilson, in certain to make the defeat of [Theodore] Roosevelt." Munson was not in favor of prohibition, telling the United Press, "I am not a believer of prohibition as it is handled today, and did not believe it incumbent on me to interfere with local saloons so long as they were conducted in accordance with laws of the city, county and state."

During the Warrenton municipal elections on December 18, 1913, George Schmitz was elected to succeed Munson, who declined to run for re-election. Munson continued to stay active in public life, serving as the secretary of the Warrenton Civic Club in 1916 and as secretary of the Warrenton branch of the American Red Cross throughout World War I. In 1921, she joined several coastal civic leaders, including her successor as Mayor of Warrenton, George Schmitz, in advocating for a paved highway from Portland to Warrenton.

Munson died on October 19, 1938.

== See also ==
- List of first female mayors
