= Ben Munson =

American politician

Member of the Texas House of Representatives from the 22nd district
- In office January 9, 1973 – January 11, 1977

Personal details
- Party: Democratic

William Benjamin "Ben" Munson IV is an American politician. He served as a Democratic member for the 22nd district of the Texas House of Representatives.

== Life and career ==
Munson was a Denison attorney.

Munson served in the Texas House of Representatives from 1973 to 1977.
