= Edward Lyman Munson =

US Army Medical Corps general (1868–1947)

Edward L. Munson
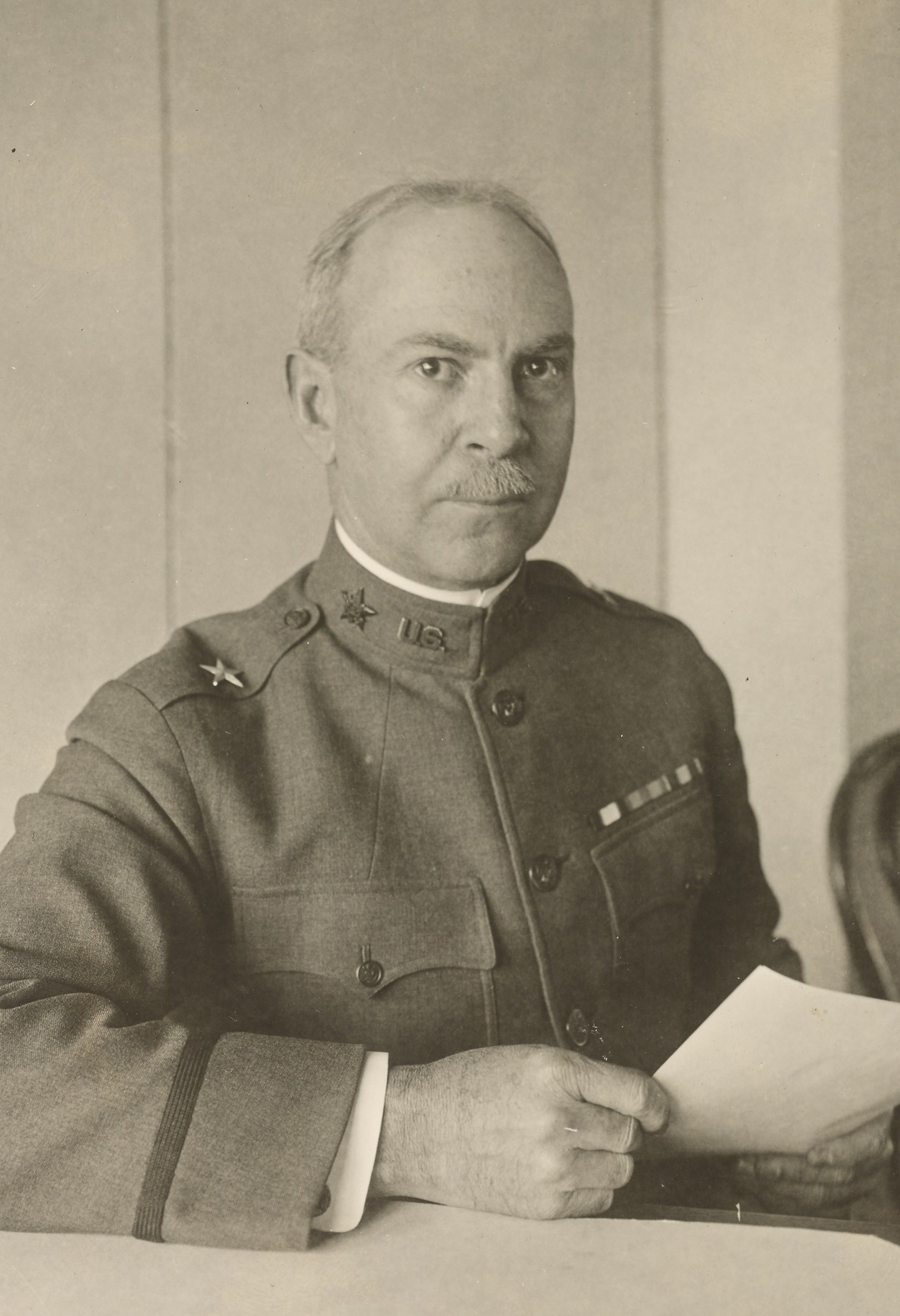
- General Edward L. Munson as Chief of the Morale Branch in 1919
- Born: December 27, 1868; New Haven, Connecticut, United States
- Died: July 7, 1947 (aged 78); New Haven, Connecticut, United States
- Burial place: Arlington National Cemetery
- Military career
- Allegiance: United States
- Branch: Medical Corps
- Service years: 1893–1932
- Rank: Brigadier general
- Service number: 0-235
- Unit: Office of the Surgeon General (OTSG)
- Awards: Distinguished Service Medal; Order of the Bath (CB)

Brigadier General Edward Lyman Munson (December 27, 1868 – July 7, 1947) was a senior officer of the United States Army Medical Corps. He served in several conflicts, was an instructor and teacher for matters of field hygiene and sanitation, and authored several publications.

== Military career ==
Born in New Haven, Connecticut, Munson was the son of attorney and judge Lyman E. Munson. Edward L. Munson graduated from the Yale School of Medicine in 1892. He accepted a commission with the US Navy but turned it down a few months later, to join the US Army. After joining the Army in 1893, Lieutenant Munson was assigned to Fort Assinniboine in Montana. In 1889 he received a new assignment to Fort Adams, Rhode Island, but was shortly afterwards deployed with the 5th Artillery, Fifth Army Corps in Chickamauga, Georgia. As part of the Spanish–American War, the unit was sent to Cuba. Many soldiers had already been infected with Typhoid fever while being mobilized in Chickamauga; in Cuba, Munson was in charged with preparing the ships that would carry back the casualties.

After educational programs of the Army Medical School had been put to a halt during the conflict, in 1900, Munson was put in charge of a newly formed training unit for hospital corpsmen in Fort Lesley J. McNair. With the Army Medical School reopened in 1901, he became an assistant instructor for Military Hygiene.

In 1903, he was assigned to the Philippines to serve as health officer for Manila under Governor William Howard Taft. Munson got infected with Tuberculosis and was sent back to the US for recovery in 1904. Now a major, he became an instructor at the United States Army Command and General Staff College in 1908. From 1913 to 1915 he served again in the Philippines. After his return he became editor of the journal Military Medicine and was with the US troops on the Mexican border during the Pancho Villa Expedition in 1916.

=== Munson last ===
Munson was the head of the Army Shoe Board, in charge of developing footwear for the Army, and authored The Soldier's Foot and the Military Shoe: A Handbook for Officers and Noncommissioned Officers of the Line. From 1908 to 1912, he studied the feet of 2,000 soldiers using physical examination and radiography. The chapters of his book discuss the anatomy and proper care of the foot, foot injuries, problems and solutions in the fitting of shoes and socks to different foot shapes, and the design, supply, and maintenance of military shoes. He developed a new last, or shoe form, known as the Munson last, that formed the basis of the design of U.S. military shoes and boots beginning in 1912, and also became a popular civilian shoe style. A Munson shoe is snug in the heel and arch for proper support, but has a roomy, slightly upturned toe area in order to allow "the foot to assume a shape and relation approximately like that of the same foot when unconfined."

=== World War I ===
During World War I, Munson was in the office of the Surgeon General as chief of the Training Division and was promoted to brigadier general in late 1918. Edward Munson was ordered to Japan to command an American medical relief unit after the Great Kantō earthquake in 1923. He took a third assignment to the Philippines, and finally commanded the Medical Field Service School at Carlisle Barracks in 1931 before his retirement in 1932.

== Later life ==
After his retirement from the Army, Munson taught Preventive Medicine at the University of California until 1939.

Edward L. Munson died on July 7, 1947, in New Haven, Connecticut. He is buried with his wife Martha Jane at Arlington National Cemetery.

== Publications ==
- Emergency diet for the sick in the military service. Prepared under the direction of the surgeon general of the Army, for use in the Company of instruction, Hospital corps, Washington barracks, D.C., 1899
- The theory and practice of military hygiene, 1902
- A study in troop leading and management of the sanitary service in war, Major John F. Morrison and Major Edward L. Munson, 1910
- The principles of sanitary tactics; a handbook on the use of medical department detachments and organisations in campaign, 1912
- The soldier's foot and the military shoe; a handbook for officers and non-commissioned officers of the line, Fort Leavenworth, 1912
- The management of men; a handbook on the systemic development of morale and the control of human behavior, 1921
