= Lyman E. Munson =

American judge (1822–1908)

Lyman Ezra Munson (January 21, 1822 – February 13, 1908) was a justice of the Territorial Montana Supreme Court, appointed by President Abraham Lincoln, and serving from 1865 to 1869.

== Biography ==
Born in Great Barrington, Massachusetts, Munson's ancestors fought in the American Revolutionary War, and his mother was a cousin of Edwin Stanton. Munson attended Lenox Academy, and received a Bachelor of Laws degree from Yale Law School in 1851. He entered private practice in the office of Henry Dutton. In March 1865, he was appointed Associate Justice of the Montana Territorial Supreme Court by President Abraham Lincoln. Munson arrived in Helena, on July 9, 1865. When the Territorial Supreme court declared the second territorial legislature in March 1866 to be void, he was assigned the most remote of judicial districts. He resigned from the bench in 1868.

Munson married Lucy A. Sanford on October 6, 1846, with whom he had two daughters and a son, Edward Lyman Munson. He died in New Haven, Connecticut, at the age of 86.

Political offices
Preceded by Ammi Giddings	Justice of the Montana Supreme Court; 1865–1869	Succeeded by George G. Symes
