= Letitia Munson =

Letitia Munson née Leeney (c. 1820 – after 1882) was an African American herbalist and midwife, and the defendant in an infamous 1882 abortion trial in Canada.

== Biography ==
Letitia Leeney was born into slavery around 1820, probably in North Carolina. She once told a reporter that, at the behest of her enslaver, she had studied medicine and healing with physicians for five years and with indigenous Americans for another two years. Around 1860, having gained her liberty, she moved north and settled in Woodstock, Canada West, where, in January 1862, she married Commedess Munson. The couple had as many as five children; some or all were likely adopted. Commedess died in 1881; Munson's age is uncertain as she reported inconsistent ages in censuses and claimed to be as old as 110 in 1882.

== Abortion trial ==
In Windsor, Munson established a reputation as an herbalist and owned two small houses. The family lived in one home and she apparently let the other to pregnant women seeking privacy. She counseled women regarding unwanted pregnancies and was rumoured to perform abortions.

In 1882, a white woman named Ellen Weingardner sought out Munson's help. Five years earlier Munson had helped Weingardner, a waitress, deliver her first child, and Weingardner was pregnant again. A man claiming to be her husband arranged for her to board with Munson, and promptly left town. On the morning of September 16 1882, Weingardner was found dead in a pool of blood; she had been about eight months pregnant. An autopsy concluded she had likely died from "instrumental violence" (i.e. a botched abortion), although natural causes couldn't be ruled out. A search of Munson's home found instruments that could have been used to carry out an abortion, and Munson was arrested and charged with "procuring a miscarriage". Munson claimed that she had left Weingardner alive at 10 p.m. the previous evening, and had discovered her body in the morning.

Although not the first abortion trial in the region, her case was sensationalized by the media due to the racial dynamics. Newspaper headlines called it a "murder", and reports leaned heavily on racial stereotypes and impugned Munson's character. At trial, Munson's attorney argued that Weingardner had died of natural causes, or that, if an abortion had been performed, Weingardner had done it herself, and begged the jury to disregard the many "untrue statements...made in the press." The all-white, all-male jury found Munson not guilty, although the Woodstock Sentinel-Review reported that the men were convinced of her "moral guilt".

== Aftermath ==
Little is known of Munson following the trial. Her son Frederick is known to have married in 1885, but Munson is otherwise absent from any further historical record. The stigma of the scandal likely made Munson a social outcast and she may have been forced to move elsewhere.
