= Donald E. Munson =

American state legislator and accountant

Member of the South Dakota House of Representatives
- In office 1993–2000

Personal details
- Born: June 13, 1936 (age 90)
- Party: Republican

Donald E. Munson (born June 13, 1936) is an American Republican politician who served in the South Dakota House of Representatives from 1993 until 2000.
