= 2026 South Dakota elections =

- November 3, 2026

The 2026 South Dakota elections was held in the U.S. state of South Dakota on November 3, 2026, alongside the nationwide midterm elections. Elections will be held for a United States Senate seat and the state's U.S. House of Representatives at-large seat as well as elections for governor, most other statewide executive offices, all seats in the South Dakota Senate and House of Representatives, and other elections. Primary elections were held on June 2, 2026, alongside several other local and municipal elections.

A red state, South Dakota has not elected a Democrat to federal office since 2008, when incumbent senator Tim Johnson and incumbent U.S. representative Stephanie Herseth Sandlin both won re-election. Despite not electing Democrats to statewide or federal office, Senate Minority Leader Billie Sutton came within 11,500 votes of winning the governorship in 2018, the closest gubernatorial race since the state moved to four-year gubernatorial terms, beginning in 1974. (Note: While the 2018 election was the closest in terms of margin of victory since the state moved to four-term gubernatorial terms in 1974, the elections of 1960, 1958, 1936, 1912, 1898, and 1896 were closer.) Republicans have held control of both chambers of the state legislature since 1995.

== Federal elections ==
=== United States Senate ===
Incumbent Republican senator Mike Rounds, who was re-elected in 2020 with 65.7% of the vote, is running for re-election to a third term in office. He defeated Navy veteran Justin McNeal in the Republican primary.

Former South Dakota state trooper Julian Beaudion ran uncontested for the Democratic nomination, but later withdrew from the race. Brian Bengs, who was the Democratic nominee in 2022 for South Dakota's Class III Senate seat held by John Thune, is running as an independent candidate.

=== United States House of Representatives ===
Incumbent Republican representative Dusty Johnson, who was re-elected in 2024 with 72.0% of the vote, announced in June 2025 that he would not seek re-election and would instead run for governor. Incumbent state attorney general Marty Jackley defeated businessman James Bialota for the Republican nomination.

Former South Dakota Democratic Party vice chairwoman and state USDA Rural Development director Nikki Gronli ran unopposed for the Democratic nomination.

== State executive ==
=== Governor ===
Term-limited Republican governor Kristi Noem, who was re-elected in 2022 with 62.0% of the vote, resigned on January 25, 2025, following her confirmation as Secretary of Homeland Security by the United States Senate. Lieutenant governor Larry Rhoden became the governor of South Dakota immediately following her resignation. He is running for a full term in office in 2026.

Rhoden defeated incumbent U.S. representative Dusty Johnson, South Dakota House speaker Jon Hansen, and businessman Toby Doeden in the Republican primary Dakota State University student Robert Arnold failed to reach number of valid signatures and will not appear on the primary ballot. Former member of the South Dakota State Senate Dan Ahlers is the democratic nominee for Governor.

=== Attorney General ===
Incumbent Republican attorney general Marty Jackley, who was elected in 2022 unopposed, declined to seek re-election and is instead running for the state's U.S. House seat.

Former state senator and state representative Lance Russell ran unopposed for the Republican nomination. He is expected to win the general election unopposed as no other candidate filed.

=== Secretary of State ===
Incumbent Republican secretary of state Monae Johnson, who was first elected in 2022 with 63.9% of the vote, ran for re-election to a second term in office, but was defeated by state representative Heather Baxter in the state convention.

Former state trooper Terrence Davis ran unopposed for the Democratic nomination.

=== Treasurer ===
Incumbent Republican state treasurer Josh Haeder was re-elected in 2022 with 67.0% of the vote. He is term-limited and cannot seek re-election to a third consecutive term in office.

State treasury manager Melissa Hull ran unopposed for the Republican nomination.

=== Auditor ===
Incumbent Republican state auditor Rich Sattgast was re-elected in 2022 with 62.7% of the vote. He is term-limited and cannot seek re-election to a third consecutive term in office.

Sioux Falls city councilman David Barranco announced his candidacy for the Republican nomination. Following his receiving a stage IV cancer diagnosis, he suspended his campaign. His wife, Catherine, is running in his place.

=== Commissioner of School and Public Lands ===
Incumbent Republican commissioner of school and public lands Brock Greenfield, who was first elected in 2022 with 66.7% of the vote, is running for re-election to a second term in office.

=== Public Utilities Commission ===
Incumbent Republican public utilities commissioner Gary Hanson was re-elected in 2020 with 68.0% of the vote. He decided not to run for re-election after diagnosis of a cancer.

== Ballot measures ==
=== Amendment L ===
Amendment L would raise the vote threshold for state constitutional amendments on the ballot from a simple majority of 50% to a supermajority of 60%. It requires a simple majority to pass.

== Local elections ==
=== Sioux Falls ===
Sioux Falls held a mayoral election on June 2, 2026, alongside the statewide primaries, due to the passage of House Bill 1130 in 2025. House Bill 1130 requires local and municipal elections to be held either alongside the statewide primaries or the general election.

Incumbent mayor Paul TenHaken was re-elected in 2022 with 73.4% of the vote. He was term-limited and could not seek re-election to a third consecutive term in office. City councilor and former Republican state representative Christine Erickson defeated state senator and 2022 Democratic gubernatorial nominee Jamie Smith in the runoff after both failed to receive 50% of the total votes in the primary election with Erickson getting 37% and Smith 25.

=== Other municipalities ===
Mitchell voted 72-28% to implement term limits for its mayor and city council.

Incumbent Pierre mayor Steven Harding lost re-election to Todd Johnson 54–46%.

== See also ==
- Political party strength in South Dakota
