= 2022 South Dakota Public Utilities Commission election =

- November 8, 2022
Candidate	Chris Nelson	Jeffrey Barth
Party	Republican	Democratic
Popular vote	227,167	103,384
Percentage	68.72%	31.28%
- County results Nelson: 50–60% 60–70% 70–80% 80–90% >90% Barth: 50–60% 70–80% 80–90%
Public Utilities Commissioner before election
Chris Nelson
Republican
Elected Public Utilities Commissioner
Chris Nelson
Republican

The 2022 South Dakota Public Utilities Commission election was held on November 8, 2022, to elect one of three members of the South Dakota Public Utilities Commission. Incumbent Republican Chris Nelson was re-elected to a second full term in office, defeating Democratic challenger Jeffrey Barth in a landslide.

== Republican primary ==
=== Candidates ===
==== Nominee ====
- Chris Nelson, incumbent public utilities commissioner (2011–present)

== Democratic primary ==
=== Candidates ===
==== Nominee ====
- Jeffrey Barth, Minnehaha County commissioner (2007–2023)

== General election ==
=== Results ===
2022 South Dakota Public Utilities Commission election
Party	Candidate	Votes	%	±%
Republican	Chris Nelson (incumbent)	227,167	68.72%	−6.66%
Democratic	Jeffrey Barth	103,384	31.28%	+6.66%
Total votes		330,551	100.00%	N/A
Republican hold				

==== By county ====
County	Chris Nelson Republican		Jeffrey Barth Democratic		Margin		Total
County	#	%	#	%	#	%	Total
Aurora	973	83.38%	194	16.62%	779	66.75%	1,167
Beadle	4,163	74.02%	1,461	25.98%	2,702	48.04%	5,624
Bennett	610	63.67%	348	36.33%	262	27.35%	958
Bon Homme	1,855	76.37%	574	23.63%	1,281	52.74%	2,429
Brookings	7,605	65.46%	4,013	34.54%	3,592	30.92%	11,618
Brown	8,946	67.64%	4,280	32.36%	4,666	35.28%	13,226
Brule	1,501	75.35%	491	24.65%	1,010	50.70%	1,992
Buffalo	153	40.80%	222	59.20%	-69	-18.40%	375
Butte	3,298	81.96%	726	18.04%	2,572	63.92%	4,024
Campbell	571	88.80%	72	11.20%	499	77.60%	643
Charles Mix	2,205	73.80%	783	26.20%	1,422	47.59%	2,988
Clark	1,210	80.29%	297	19.71%	913	60.58%	1,507
Clay	2,333	52.43%	2,117	47.57%	216	4.85%	4,450
Codington	7,729	74.95%	2,583	25.05%	5,146	49.90%	10,312
Corson	514	57.88%	374	42.12%	140	15.77%	888
Custer	3,733	76.86%	1,124	23.14%	2,609	53.72%	4,857
Davison	5,159	74.88%	1,731	25.12%	3,428	49.75%	6,890
Day	1,638	68.91%	739	31.09%	899	37.82%	2,377
Deuel	1,491	77.98%	421	22.02%	1,070	55.96%	1,912
Dewey	677	45.10%	824	54.90%	-147	-9.79%	1,501
Douglas	1,280	91.23%	123	8.77%	1,157	82.47%	1,403
Edmunds	1,316	81.94%	290	18.06%	1,026	63.89%	1,606
Fall River	2,719	77.51%	789	22.49%	1,930	55.02%	3,508
Faulk	780	85.62%	131	14.38%	649	71.24%	911
Grant	2,350	77.61%	678	22.39%	1,672	55.22%	3,028
Gregory	1,607	82.33%	345	17.67%	1,262	64.65%	1,952
Haakon	867	91.46%	81	8.54%	786	82.91%	948
Hamlin	2,141	82.76%	446	17.24%	1,695	65.52%	2,587
Hand	1,159	80.43%	282	19.57%	877	60.86%	1,441
Hanson	1,269	81.82%	282	18.18%	987	63.64%	1,551
Harding	611	94.73%	34	5.27%	577	89.46%	645
Hughes	5,508	75.93%	1,746	24.07%	3,762	51.86%	7,254
Hutchinson	2,531	83.78%	490	16.22%	2,041	67.56%	3,021
Hyde	436	78.56%	119	21.44%	317	57.12%	555
Jackson	638	71.13%	259	28.87%	379	42.25%	897
Jerauld	651	78.15%	182	21.85%	469	56.30%	833
Jones	402	87.77%	56	12.23%	346	75.55%	458
Kingsbury	1,848	76.94%	554	23.06%	1,294	53.87%	2,402
Lake	3,369	71.77%	1,325	28.23%	2,044	43.54%	4,694
Lawrence	8,121	70.16%	3,454	29.84%	4,667	40.32%	11,575
Lincoln	17,898	67.90%	8,462	32.10%	9,436	35.80%	26,360
Lyman	912	73.79%	324	26.21%	588	47.57%	1,236
Marshall	1,168	66.25%	595	33.75%	573	32.50%	1,763
McCook	1,898	78.40%	523	21.60%	1,375	56.79%	2,421
McPherson	882	82.58%	186	17.42%	696	65.17%	1,068
Meade	8,751	78.09%	2,456	21.91%	6,295	56.17%	11,207
Mellette	400	66.33%	203	33.67%	197	32.67%	603
Miner	738	78.43%	203	21.57%	535	56.85%	941
Minnehaha	41,364	59.15%	28,572	40.85%	12,792	18.29%	69,936
Moody	1,643	64.97%	886	35.03%	757	29.93%	2,529
Oglala Lakota	279	12.06%	2,035	87.94%	-1,756	-75.89%	2,314
Pennington	28,934	67.80%	13,742	32.20%	15,192	35.60%	42,676
Perkins	1,132	87.62%	160	12.38%	972	75.23%	1,292
Potter	914	86.39%	144	13.61%	770	72.78%	1,058
Roberts	2,122	63.42%	1,224	36.58%	898	26.84%	3,346
Sanborn	759	79.73%	193	20.27%	566	59.45%	952
Spink	1,893	73.57%	680	26.43%	1,213	47.14%	2,573
Stanley	1,114	79.46%	288	20.54%	826	58.92%	1,402
Sully	619	80.08%	154	19.92%	465	60.16%	773
Todd	476	25.66%	1,379	74.34%	-903	-48.68%	1,855
Tripp	1,857	84.87%	331	15.13%	1,526	69.74%	2,188
Turner	2,958	79.64%	756	20.36%	2,202	59.29%	3,714
Union	4,831	74.89%	1,620	25.11%	3,211	49.78%	6,451
Walworth	1,623	82.51%	344	17.49%	1,279	65.02%	1,967
Yankton	5,687	68.69%	2,592	31.31%	3,095	37.38%	8,279
Ziebach	348	54.38%	292	45.63%	56	8.75%	640
Totals	227,167	68.72%	103,384	31.28%	123,783	37.45%	330,551

Counties that flipped from Democratic to Republican

- Ziebach (largest city: Dupree)
