= 2016 South Dakota Public Utilities Commission election =

- November 8, 2016
| Candidate | Chris Nelson | Henry Red Cloud |
| Party | Republican | Democratic |
| Popular vote | 268,948 | 87,859 |
| Percentage | 75.38% | 24.62% |
- County results Nelson: 50–60% 60–70% 70–80% 80–90% >90% Red Cloud: 50–60% 60–70% 70–80% >90%
Public Utilities Commissioner before election
Chris Nelson
Republican
Elected Public Utilities Commissioner
Chris Nelson
Republican

The 2016 South Dakota Public Utilities Commission election was held on November 8, 2016, to elect one of three members of the South Dakota Public Utilities Commission. Incumbent Republican Chris Nelson, appointed to the position in 2011 and elected to an unexpired term in 2012, was re-elected to his first full term in office, defeating Democratic challenger Henry Red Cloud in a landslide.

== Republican primary ==
=== Candidates ===
==== Nominee ====
- Chris Nelson, incumbent public utilities commissioner (2011–present)

== Democratic primary ==
=== Candidates ===
==== Nominee ====
- Henry Red Cloud, entrepreneur

== General election ==
=== Results ===
2016 South Dakota Public Utilities Commission election
| Party | Candidate | Votes | % |
|---|---|---|---|
| Republican | Chris Nelson (incumbent) | 268,948 | 75.38% |
| Democratic | Henry Red Cloud | 87,859 | 24.62% |
| Total votes | | 356,807 | 100.00% |
| Republican hold | | | |

==== By county ====
| County | Chris Nelson Republican | | Henry Red Cloud Democratic | | Margin | | Total |
| County | # | % | # | % | # | % | Total |
|---|---|---|---|---|---|---|---|
| Aurora | 1,201 | 85.24% | 208 | 14.76% | 993 | 70.48% | 1,409 |
| Beadle | 5,376 | 80.16% | 1,331 | 19.84% | 4,045 | 60.31% | 6,707 |
| Bennett | 685 | 61.22% | 434 | 38.78% | 251 | 22.43% | 1,119 |
| Bon Homme | 2,415 | 83.51% | 477 | 16.49% | 1,938 | 67.01% | 2,892 |
| Brookings | 8,899 | 72.50% | 3,376 | 27.50% | 5,523 | 44.99% | 12,275 |
| Brown | 11,775 | 75.46% | 3,829 | 24.54% | 7,946 | 50.92% | 15,604 |
| Brule | 1,862 | 83.24% | 375 | 16.76% | 1,487 | 66.47% | 2,237 |
| Buffalo | 174 | 35.73% | 313 | 64.27% | -139 | -28.54% | 487 |
| Butte | 3,542 | 84.27% | 661 | 15.73% | 2,881 | 68.55% | 4,203 |
| Campbell | 763 | 92.94% | 58 | 7.06% | 705 | 85.87% | 821 |
| Charles Mix | 2,639 | 77.50% | 766 | 22.50% | 1,873 | 55.01% | 3,405 |
| Clark | 1,369 | 84.82% | 245 | 15.18% | 1,124 | 69.64% | 1,614 |
| Clay | 2,858 | 58.95% | 1,990 | 41.05% | 868 | 17.90% | 4,848 |
| Codington | 9,122 | 81.04% | 2,134 | 18.96% | 6,988 | 62.08% | 11,256 |
| Corson | 589 | 51.71% | 550 | 48.29% | 39 | 3.42% | 1,139 |
| Custer | 3,507 | 76.36% | 1,086 | 23.64% | 2,421 | 52.71% | 4,593 |
| Davison | 6,405 | 81.59% | 1,445 | 18.41% | 4,960 | 63.18% | 7,850 |
| Day | 1,964 | 74.73% | 664 | 25.27% | 1,300 | 49.47% | 2,628 |
| Deuel | 1,650 | 80.84% | 391 | 19.16% | 1,259 | 61.69% | 2,041 |
| Dewey | 702 | 42.21% | 961 | 57.79% | -259 | -15.57% | 1,663 |
| Douglas | 1,427 | 91.12% | 139 | 8.88% | 1,288 | 82.25% | 1,566 |
| Edmunds | 1,582 | 86.17% | 254 | 13.83% | 1,328 | 72.33% | 1,836 |
| Fall River | 2,541 | 74.10% | 888 | 25.90% | 1,653 | 48.21% | 3,429 |
| Faulk | 941 | 85.94% | 154 | 14.06% | 787 | 71.87% | 1,095 |
| Grant | 2,827 | 81.75% | 631 | 18.25% | 2,196 | 63.50% | 3,458 |
| Gregory | 1,654 | 82.33% | 355 | 17.67% | 1,299 | 64.66% | 2,009 |
| Haakon | 964 | 93.87% | 63 | 6.13% | 901 | 87.73% | 1,027 |
| Hamlin | 2,338 | 86.40% | 368 | 13.60% | 1,970 | 72.80% | 2,706 |
| Hand | 1,556 | 87.12% | 230 | 12.88% | 1,326 | 74.24% | 1,786 |
| Hanson | 1,529 | 81.16% | 355 | 18.84% | 1,174 | 62.31% | 1,884 |
| Harding | 699 | 92.83% | 54 | 7.17% | 645 | 85.66% | 753 |
| Hughes | 6,750 | 82.66% | 1,416 | 17.34% | 5,334 | 65.32% | 8,166 |
| Hutchinson | 2,885 | 87.29% | 420 | 12.71% | 2,465 | 74.58% | 3,305 |
| Hyde | 580 | 85.93% | 95 | 14.07% | 485 | 71.85% | 675 |
| Jackson | 725 | 68.46% | 334 | 31.54% | 391 | 36.92% | 1,059 |
| Jerauld | 749 | 78.51% | 205 | 21.49% | 544 | 57.02% | 954 |
| Jones | 489 | 88.27% | 65 | 11.73% | 424 | 76.53% | 554 |
| Kingsbury | 1,970 | 79.56% | 506 | 20.44% | 1,464 | 59.13% | 2,476 |
| Lake | 4,850 | 75.39% | 1,583 | 24.61% | 3,267 | 50.79% | 6,433 |
| Lawrence | 8,511 | 74.01% | 2,989 | 25.99% | 5,522 | 48.02% | 11,500 |
| Lincoln | 19,536 | 80.19% | 4,826 | 19.81% | 14,710 | 60.38% | 24,362 |
| Lyman | 1,049 | 75.63% | 338 | 24.37% | 711 | 51.26% | 1,387 |
| Marshall | 1,421 | 74.95% | 475 | 25.05% | 946 | 49.89% | 1,896 |
| McCook | 2,150 | 84.55% | 393 | 15.45% | 1,757 | 69.09% | 2,543 |
| McPherson | 1,021 | 89.80% | 116 | 10.20% | 905 | 79.60% | 1,137 |
| Meade | 9,036 | 80.94% | 2,128 | 19.06% | 6,908 | 61.88% | 11,164 |
| Mellette | 449 | 65.93% | 232 | 34.07% | 217 | 31.86% | 681 |
| Miner | 885 | 83.41% | 176 | 16.59% | 709 | 66.82% | 1,061 |
| Minnehaha | 53,394 | 71.95% | 20,815 | 28.05% | 32,579 | 43.90% | 74,209 |
| Moody | 2,083 | 72.15% | 804 | 27.85% | 1,279 | 44.30% | 2,887 |
| Oglala Lakota | 269 | 9.37% | 2,601 | 90.63% | -2,332 | -81.25% | 2,870 |
| Pennington | 32,892 | 72.48% | 12,490 | 27.52% | 20,402 | 44.96% | 45,382 |
| Perkins | 1,385 | 88.39% | 182 | 11.61% | 1,203 | 76.77% | 1,567 |
| Potter | 1,166 | 89.35% | 139 | 10.65% | 1,027 | 78.70% | 1,305 |
| Roberts | 2,531 | 66.66% | 1,266 | 33.34% | 1,265 | 33.32% | 3,797 |
| Sanborn | 924 | 84.31% | 172 | 15.69% | 752 | 68.61% | 1,096 |
| Spink | 2,361 | 80.72% | 564 | 19.28% | 1,797 | 61.44% | 2,925 |
| Stanley | 1,293 | 83.96% | 247 | 16.04% | 1,046 | 67.92% | 1,540 |
| Sully | 734 | 87.28% | 107 | 12.72% | 627 | 74.55% | 841 |
| Todd | 469 | 22.56% | 1,610 | 77.44% | -1,141 | -54.88% | 2,079 |
| Tripp | 2,214 | 85.61% | 372 | 14.39% | 1,842 | 71.23% | 2,586 |
| Turner | 3,382 | 83.30% | 678 | 16.70% | 2,704 | 66.60% | 4,060 |
| Union | 5,867 | 77.41% | 1,712 | 22.59% | 4,155 | 54.82% | 7,579 |
| Walworth | 2,045 | 85.17% | 356 | 14.83% | 1,689 | 70.35% | 2,401 |
| Yankton | 6,955 | 75.25% | 2,287 | 24.75% | 4,668 | 50.51% | 9,242 |
| Ziebach | 373 | 49.87% | 375 | 50.13% | -2 | -0.27% | 748 |
| Totals | 268,948 | 75.38% | 87,859 | 24.62% | 181,089 | 50.75% | 356,807 |
