= 2014 South Dakota Public Utilities Commission election =

- November 4, 2014
Candidate	Gary Hanson	David Allen
Party	Republican	Democratic
Popular vote	167,726	74,824
Percentage	65.73%	29.32%
- County results Hanson: 50–60% 60–70% 70–80% 80–90% Allen: 40–50% 50–60% 60–70% 70–80% 80–90%
Public Utilities Commissioner before election
Gary Hanson
Republican
Elected Public Utilities Commissioner
Gary Hanson
Republican

The 2014 South Dakota Public Utilities Commission election was held on November 4, 2014, to elect one of three members of the South Dakota Public Utilities Commission. Incumbent Republican Gary Hanson was re-elected to a third term in office, defeating Democratic challenger David Allen in a landslide.

== Republican primary ==
=== Candidates ===
==== Nominee ====
- Gary Hanson, incumbent public utilities commissioner (2003–present)

== Democratic primary ==
=== Candidates ===
==== Nominee ====
- David Allen, candidate for state Senate in 2012

==== Declined ====
- Jeffrey Barth, Minnehaha County commissioner (2007–2023)

== Constitution primary ==
=== Candidates ===
==== Nominee ====
- Wayne Schmidt

== General election ==
=== Results ===
2014 South Dakota Public Utilities Commission election
Party	Candidate	Votes	%
Republican	Gary Hanson (incumbent)	167,726	65.73%
Democratic	David Allen	74,824	29.32%
Constitution	Wayne Schmidt	12,642	4.95%
Total votes		255,192	100.00%
Republican hold			

==== By county ====
County	Gary Hanson Republican		David Allen Democratic		Wayne Schmidt Constitution		Margin		Total
County	#	%	#	%	#	%	#	%	Total
Aurora	680	64.39%	330	31.25%	46	4.36%	350	33.14%	1,056
Beadle	3,476	66.02%	1,577	29.95%	212	4.03%	1,899	36.07%	5,265
Bennett	438	51.96%	336	39.86%	69	8.19%	102	12.10%	843
Bon Homme	1,378	62.72%	702	31.95%	117	5.33%	676	30.77%	2,197
Brookings	5,253	62.69%	2,709	32.33%	417	4.98%	2,544	30.36%	8,379
Brown	6,543	59.41%	3,982	36.16%	488	4.43%	2,561	23.25%	11,013
Brule	1,099	67.22%	452	27.65%	84	5.14%	647	39.57%	1,635
Buffalo	129	30.00%	284	66.05%	17	3.95%	-155	-36.05%	430
Butte	2,109	71.27%	585	19.77%	265	8.96%	1,524	51.50%	2,959
Campbell	473	80.44%	81	13.78%	34	5.78%	392	66.67%	588
Charles Mix	1,763	59.76%	1,089	36.92%	98	3.32%	674	22.85%	2,950
Clark	946	68.85%	360	26.20%	68	4.95%	586	42.65%	1,374
Clay	1,753	51.73%	1,518	44.79%	118	3.48%	235	6.93%	3,389
Codington	5,516	66.64%	2,393	28.91%	368	4.45%	3,123	37.73%	8,277
Corson	385	44.00%	412	47.09%	78	8.91%	-27	-3.09%	875
Custer	2,247	66.26%	870	25.66%	274	8.08%	1,377	40.61%	3,391
Davison	3,677	65.32%	1,745	31.00%	207	3.68%	1,932	34.32%	5,629
Day	1,272	57.82%	832	37.82%	96	4.36%	440	20.00%	2,200
Deuel	1,014	62.59%	498	30.74%	108	6.67%	516	31.85%	1,620
Dewey	437	32.35%	819	60.62%	95	7.03%	-382	-28.28%	1,351
Douglas	1,004	83.39%	170	14.12%	30	2.49%	834	69.27%	1,204
Edmunds	1,042	67.93%	402	26.21%	90	5.87%	640	41.72%	1,534
Fall River	1,730	65.11%	713	26.83%	214	8.05%	1,017	38.28%	2,657
Faulk	568	70.56%	200	24.84%	37	4.60%	368	45.71%	805
Grant	1,679	64.50%	796	30.58%	128	4.92%	883	33.92%	2,603
Gregory	1,200	71.22%	425	25.22%	60	3.56%	775	45.99%	1,685
Haakon	656	82.41%	106	13.32%	34	4.27%	550	69.10%	796
Hamlin	1,506	73.54%	446	21.78%	96	4.69%	1,060	51.76%	2,048
Hand	992	70.11%	385	27.21%	38	2.69%	607	42.90%	1,415
Hanson	862	70.31%	325	26.51%	39	3.18%	537	43.80%	1,226
Harding	445	80.32%	65	11.73%	44	7.94%	380	68.59%	554
Hughes	4,995	75.85%	1,348	20.47%	242	3.68%	3,647	55.38%	6,585
Hutchinson	2,011	79.27%	438	17.26%	88	3.47%	1,573	62.00%	2,537
Hyde	414	73.40%	125	22.16%	25	4.43%	289	51.24%	564
Jackson	528	62.71%	268	31.83%	46	5.46%	260	30.88%	842
Jerauld	505	65.33%	239	30.92%	29	3.75%	266	34.41%	773
Jones	359	80.67%	64	14.38%	22	4.94%	295	66.29%	445
Kingsbury	1,338	69.04%	534	27.55%	66	3.41%	804	41.49%	1,938
Lake	2,885	65.99%	1,280	29.28%	207	4.73%	1,605	36.71%	4,372
Lawrence	5,203	64.06%	2,367	29.14%	552	6.80%	2,836	34.92%	8,122
Lincoln	11,817	75.27%	3,304	21.05%	578	3.68%	8,513	54.23%	15,699
Lyman	765	65.95%	330	28.45%	65	5.60%	435	37.50%	1,160
Marshall	909	57.03%	628	39.40%	57	3.58%	281	17.63%	1,594
McCook	1,333	69.97%	466	24.46%	106	5.56%	867	45.51%	1,905
McPherson	752	80.17%	142	15.14%	44	4.69%	610	65.03%	938
Meade	5,235	68.83%	1,783	23.44%	588	7.73%	3,452	45.39%	7,606
Mellette	325	51.83%	246	39.23%	56	8.93%	79	12.60%	627
Miner	503	64.57%	246	31.58%	30	3.85%	257	32.99%	779
Minnehaha	34,129	68.23%	13,852	27.69%	2,040	4.08%	20,277	40.54%	50,021
Moody	1,334	60.66%	755	34.33%	110	5.00%	579	26.33%	2,199
Pennington	19,852	65.30%	8,660	28.48%	1,891	6.22%	11,192	36.81%	30,403
Perkins	853	70.91%	239	19.87%	111	9.23%	614	51.04%	1,203
Potter	826	76.62%	183	16.98%	69	6.40%	643	59.65%	1,078
Roberts	1,699	56.22%	1,229	40.67%	94	3.11%	470	15.55%	3,022
Sanborn	519	65.04%	233	29.20%	46	5.76%	286	35.84%	798
Shannon	241	9.40%	2,185	85.19%	139	5.42%	-1,944	-75.79%	2,565
Spink	1,470	63.42%	782	33.74%	66	2.85%	688	29.68%	2,318
Stanley	884	72.40%	280	22.93%	57	4.67%	604	49.47%	1,221
Sully	510	77.98%	117	17.89%	27	4.13%	393	60.09%	654
Todd	433	21.20%	1,466	71.79%	143	7.00%	-1,033	-50.59%	2,042
Tripp	1,531	74.03%	448	21.66%	89	4.30%	1,083	52.37%	2,068
Turner	2,376	76.33%	607	19.50%	130	4.18%	1,769	56.83%	3,113
Union	3,311	69.57%	1,233	25.91%	215	4.52%	2,078	43.66%	4,759
Walworth	1,280	70.41%	314	17.27%	224	12.32%	966	53.14%	1,818
Yankton	4,080	59.08%	2,522	36.52%	304	4.40%	1,558	22.56%	6,906
Ziebach	249	42.93%	304	52.41%	27	4.66%	-55	-9.48%	580
Totals	167,726	65.73%	74,824	29.32%	12,642	4.95%	92,902	36.40%	255,192
