= 2014 South Dakota Secretary of State election =

- November 4, 2014
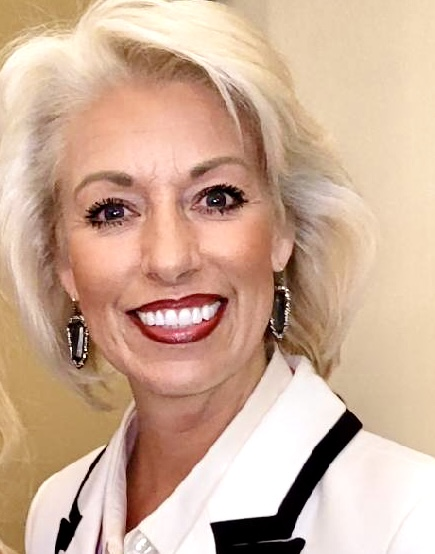

Nominee	Shantel Krebs	Angelia Schultz
Party	Republican	Democratic
Popular vote	155,647	84,181
Percentage	60.23%	32.58%
- County results Krebs: 40–50% 50–60% 60–70% 70–80% 80–90% Schultz: 40–50% 50–60% 60–70% 70–80% 80–90%
Secretary of State before election
Jason Gant
Republican
Elected Secretary of State
Shantel Krebs
Republican

The 2014 South Dakota Secretary of State election was held on November 4, 2014, to elect the next secretary of state of South Dakota. Incumbent Republican Jason Gant retired after serving one term in office. Republican state Senator Shantel Krebs defeated Democrat Angelia Schultz in a landslide to succeed Gant.

== Republican primary ==
=== Candidates ===
==== Nominee ====
- Shantel Krebs, state senator (2011–2015)

==== Eliminated at convention ====
- Pat Miller, deputy secretary of state

==== Declined ====
- Jason Gant, incumbent secretary of state (2011–2015)

== Democratic primary ==
=== Candidates ===
==== Nominee ====
- Angelia Schultz, writer and college professor

== Libertarian primary ==
=== Candidates ===
==== Nominee ====
- Emmett Reistroffer

== Constitution primary ==
=== Candidates ===
==== Nominee ====
- Lori Stacey

== General election ==
=== Polling ===
Poll source	Date(s) administered	Sample size	Margin of error	Shantel Krebs (R)	Angelia Schultz (D)	Lori Stacey (C)	Emmett Reistroffer (L)	Undecided
SurveyUSA	October 21–26, 2014	611	± 4%	46%	29%	4%	3%	17%
SurveyUSA	October 1–5, 2014	616	± 4%	43%	29%	6%	5%	18%
SurveyUSA	September 3–7, 2014	510	± 4.4%	41%	31%	7%	4%	17%

=== Results ===
2014 South Dakota Secretary of State election
Party	Candidate	Votes	%
Republican	Shantel Krebs	155,647	60.23%
Democratic	Angelia Schultz	84,181	32.58%
Constitution	Lori Stacey	10,258	3.97%
Libertarian	Emmett Reistroffer	8,328	3.22%
Total votes		258,414	100.00%
Republican hold			

==== By county ====
County	Shantel Krebs Republican		Angelia Schultz Democratic		Various candidates Other parties		Margin		Total
County	#	%	#	%	#	%	#	%	Total
Aurora	585	55.56%	397	37.70%	71	6.74%	188	17.85%	1,053
Beadle	3,130	59.80%	1,768	33.78%	336	6.42%	1,362	26.02%	5,234
Bennett	449	52.21%	325	37.79%	86	10.00%	124	14.42%	860
Bon Homme	1,238	56.40%	787	35.85%	170	7.74%	451	20.55%	2,195
Brookings	4,780	56.16%	3,115	36.60%	616	7.24%	1,665	19.56%	8,511
Brown	6,027	53.54%	4,542	40.34%	689	6.12%	1,485	13.19%	11,258
Brule	960	58.29%	568	34.49%	119	7.23%	392	23.80%	1,647
Buffalo	119	27.11%	296	67.43%	24	5.47%	-177	-40.32%	439
Butte	2,100	69.44%	591	19.54%	333	11.01%	1,509	49.90%	3,024
Campbell	449	78.50%	83	14.51%	40	6.99%	366	63.99%	572
Charles Mix	1,570	53.00%	1,227	41.42%	165	5.57%	343	11.58%	2,962
Clark	853	62.63%	424	31.13%	85	6.24%	429	31.50%	1,362
Clay	1,483	43.07%	1,691	49.11%	269	7.81%	-208	-6.04%	3,443
Codington	4,938	59.60%	2,799	33.78%	548	6.61%	2,139	25.82%	8,285
Corson	376	42.92%	408	46.58%	92	10.50%	-32	-3.65%	876
Custer	2,275	65.00%	854	24.40%	371	10.60%	1,421	40.60%	3,500
Davison	3,404	61.37%	1,772	31.95%	371	6.69%	1,632	29.42%	5,547
Day	991	45.69%	1,019	46.98%	159	7.33%	-28	-1.29%	2,169
Deuel	861	52.95%	614	37.76%	151	9.29%	247	15.19%	1,626
Dewey	420	30.52%	863	62.72%	93	6.76%	-443	-32.19%	1,376
Douglas	948	78.48%	204	16.89%	56	4.64%	744	61.59%	1,208
Edmunds	971	62.73%	497	32.11%	80	5.17%	474	30.62%	1,548
Fall River	1,792	65.96%	645	23.74%	280	10.31%	1,147	42.22%	2,717
Faulk	556	67.56%	225	27.34%	42	5.10%	331	40.22%	823
Grant	1,408	54.28%	1,012	39.01%	174	6.71%	396	15.27%	2,594
Gregory	1,031	62.11%	501	30.18%	128	7.71%	530	31.93%	1,660
Haakon	664	81.67%	107	13.16%	42	5.17%	557	68.51%	813
Hamlin	1,363	66.46%	561	27.35%	127	6.19%	802	39.10%	2,051
Hand	919	66.93%	388	28.26%	66	4.81%	531	38.67%	1,373
Hanson	803	64.86%	355	28.68%	80	6.46%	448	36.19%	1,238
Harding	454	78.68%	70	12.13%	53	9.19%	384	66.55%	577
Hughes	4,803	72.00%	1,552	23.26%	316	4.74%	3,251	48.73%	6,671
Hutchinson	1,817	71.88%	576	22.78%	135	5.34%	1,241	49.09%	2,528
Hyde	400	70.05%	151	26.44%	20	3.50%	249	43.61%	571
Jackson	525	60.90%	271	31.44%	66	7.66%	254	29.47%	862
Jerauld	427	56.71%	285	37.85%	41	5.44%	142	18.86%	753
Jones	332	75.97%	73	16.70%	32	7.32%	259	59.27%	437
Kingsbury	1,225	62.31%	625	31.79%	116	5.90%	600	30.52%	1,966
Lake	2,714	60.62%	1,424	31.81%	339	7.57%	1,290	28.81%	4,477
Lawrence	5,220	62.88%	2,346	28.26%	735	8.85%	2,874	34.62%	8,301
Lincoln	10,825	68.00%	4,143	26.03%	950	5.97%	6,682	41.98%	15,918
Lyman	656	57.44%	386	33.80%	100	8.76%	270	23.64%	1,142
Marshall	741	46.78%	761	48.04%	82	5.18%	-20	-1.26%	1,584
McCook	1,154	60.96%	583	30.80%	156	8.24%	571	30.16%	1,893
McPherson	725	75.60%	181	18.87%	53	5.53%	544	56.73%	959
Meade	5,260	67.87%	1,753	22.62%	737	9.51%	3,507	45.25%	7,750
Mellette	292	45.91%	275	43.24%	69	10.85%	17	2.67%	636
Miner	426	54.97%	295	38.06%	54	6.97%	131	16.90%	775
Minnehaha	30,219	59.42%	17,121	33.66%	3,519	6.92%	13,098	25.75%	50,859
Moody	1,185	53.38%	888	40.00%	147	6.62%	297	13.38%	2,220
Pennington	20,380	64.75%	8,541	27.13%	2,555	8.12%	11,839	37.61%	31,476
Perkins	864	69.51%	243	19.55%	136	10.94%	621	49.96%	1,243
Potter	769	71.74%	242	22.57%	61	5.69%	527	49.16%	1,072
Roberts	1,285	43.43%	1,514	51.17%	160	5.41%	-229	-7.74%	2,959
Sanborn	472	60.59%	251	32.22%	56	7.19%	221	28.37%	779
Shannon	216	8.17%	2,203	83.32%	225	8.51%	-1,987	-75.15%	2,644
Spink	1,276	54.74%	921	39.51%	134	5.75%	355	15.23%	2,331
Stanley	868	70.45%	291	23.62%	73	5.93%	577	46.83%	1,232
Sully	454	69.53%	152	23.28%	47	7.20%	302	46.25%	653
Todd	398	19.21%	1,492	72.01%	182	8.78%	-1,094	-52.80%	2,072
Tripp	1,383	67.33%	540	26.29%	131	6.38%	843	41.04%	2,054
Turner	1,949	64.09%	849	27.92%	243	7.99%	1,100	36.17%	3,041
Union	3,091	64.26%	1,402	29.15%	317	6.59%	1,689	35.11%	4,810
Walworth	1,217	69.03%	442	25.07%	104	5.90%	775	43.96%	1,763
Yankton	3,916	57.25%	2,400	35.09%	524	7.66%	1,516	22.16%	6,840
Ziebach	246	41.55%	301	50.84%	45	7.60%	-55	-9.29%	592
Totals	155,647	60.23%	84,181	32.58%	18,586	7.19%	71,466	27.66%	258,414

Counties that flipped from Democratic to Republican

- Brule (largest city: Chamberlain)
- Miner (largest city: Howard)
- Moody (largest city: Flandreau)
- Turner (largest city: Parker)
