= National Register of Historic Places listings in Buffalo County, South Dakota =

Location of Buffalo County in South Dakota

This is a list of the National Register of Historic Places listings in Buffalo County, South Dakota.

This is intended to be a complete list of the properties and districts on the National Register of Historic Places in Buffalo County, South Dakota, United States. The locations of National Register properties and districts for which the latitude and longitude coordinates are included below, may be seen in a map.

There are 7 properties and districts listed on the National Register in the county, including 2 National Historic Landmarks. Another property was once listed but has been removed.

This National Park Service list is complete through NPS recent listings posted March 14, 2025.

== Current listings ==
	Name on the Register	Image	Date listed	Location	City or town	Description
1	Bank of Buffalo County		February 12, 1999 (#99000206)	Main St. 44°01′59″N 98°59′11″W	Gann Valley	
2	Crow Creek Site	Crow Creek Site	October 15, 1966 (#66000710)	Address restricted	Chamberlain	
3	Duncan Church		February 12, 1999 (#99000207)	Southwest of Crow Creek, 2 miles south of the county line 44°10′50″N 99°04′09″W	Gann Valley	
4	Fort Thompson Archeological District		August 14, 1986 (#86002738)	Address restricted	Fort Thompson	
5	Fort Thompson Mounds	Fort Thompson Mounds	October 15, 1966 (#66000711)	Address restricted	Fort Thompson	a National Historic Landmark District
6	Long View Stock Farm		August 24, 2018 (#100002808)	22182 361st Ave. 44°01′31″N 98°58′00″W	Gann Valley vicinity	
7	Talking Crow Archeological Site	Talking Crow Archeological Site	June 2, 2003 (#03000505)	Address restricted	Fort Thompson	

== Former listing ==
	Name on the Register	Image	Date listed	Date removed	Location	City or town	Description
1	Old Buffalo County Courthouse and Jail House		June 27, 2002 (#02000707)	March 26, 2008	100 Main Street	Gann Valley	

== See also ==
- List of National Historic Landmarks in South Dakota
- National Register of Historic Places listings in South Dakota
