= 2020 South Dakota Public Utilities Commission election =

- November 3, 2020
Candidate	Gary Hanson	Remi W. B. Bald Eagle	Devin Saxon
Party	Republican	Democratic	Libertarian
Popular vote	272,378	107,494	20,622
Percentage	68.01%	26.84%	5.15%
- County results Hanson: 50–60% 60–70% 70–80% 80–90% 90–100% Bald Eagle: 50–60% 60–70% 70–80% 80–90% Tie: 40–50%
Public Utilities Commissioner before election
Gary Hanson
Republican
Elected Public Utilities Commissioner
Gary Hanson
Republican

The 2020 South Dakota Public Utilities Commission election was held on November 3, 2020, to elect one of three members of the South Dakota Public Utilities Commission. Incumbent Republican Gary Hanson was re-elected to a fourth term in office, defeating Democratic challenger Remi W. B. Bald Eagle in a landslide.

== Republican primary ==
=== Candidates ===
==== Nominee ====
- Gary Hanson, incumbent public utilities commissioner (2003–present)

== Democratic primary ==
=== Candidates ===
==== Nominee ====
- Remi W. B. Bald Eagle, Cheyenne River Sioux Tribe Intergovernmental Affairs Coordinator

== Libertarian primary ==
=== Candidates ===
==== Nominee ====
- Devin Saxon, graphic designer

== General election ==
=== Polling ===
Poll source	Date(s) administered	Sample size (Note: Key: A – all adults RV – registered voters LV – likely voters V – unclear)	Margin of error	Gary Hanson (R)	Remi Bald Eagle (D)	Devin Saxon (L)	Undecided
Nielson Brothers Polling	October 24–28, 2020	469 (LV)	± 4.52%	50%	30%	10%	10%

=== Results ===
2020 South Dakota Public Utilities Commission election
Party	Candidate	Votes	%	±%
Republican	Gary Hanson (incumbent)	272,378	68.01%	+2.28%
Democratic	Remi W. B. Bald Eagle	107,494	26.84%	−2.48%
Libertarian	Devin Saxon	20,622	5.15%	N/A
Total votes		400,494	100.00%	N/A
Republican hold				

==== By county ====
County	Gary Hanson Republican		Remi W. B. Bald Eagle Democratic		Devin Saxon Libertarian		Margin		Total
County	#	%	#	%	#	%	#	%	Total
Aurora	1,073	80.37%	207	15.51%	55	4.12%	866	64.87%	1,335
Beadle	5,131	75.41%	1,372	20.16%	301	4.42%	3,759	55.25%	6,804
Bennett	631	56.80%	429	38.61%	51	4.59%	202	18.18%	1,111
Bon Homme	2,193	77.74%	491	17.41%	137	4.86%	1,702	60.33%	2,821
Brookings	8,523	62.45%	4,389	32.16%	735	5.39%	4,134	30.29%	13,647
Brown	11,118	67.53%	4,531	27.52%	814	4.94%	6,587	40.01%	16,463
Brule	1,774	74.41%	486	20.39%	124	5.20%	1,288	54.03%	2,384
Buffalo	174	32.89%	340	64.27%	15	2.84%	-166	-31.38%	529
Butte	3,577	77.63%	737	15.99%	294	6.38%	2,840	61.63%	4,608
Campbell	734	87.90%	75	8.98%	26	3.11%	659	78.92%	835
Charles Mix	2,532	69.09%	1,036	28.27%	97	2.65%	1,496	40.82%	3,665
Clark	1,382	78.88%	275	15.70%	95	5.42%	1,107	63.18%	1,752
Clay	2,778	52.13%	2,299	43.14%	252	4.73%	479	8.99%	5,329
Codington	9,285	75.59%	2,352	19.15%	646	5.26%	6,933	56.44%	12,283
Corson	605	48.67%	605	48.67%	33	2.65%	0	0.00%	1,243
Custer	3,692	70.51%	1,243	23.74%	301	5.75%	2,449	46.77%	5,236
Davison	6,010	74.69%	1,631	20.27%	406	5.05%	4,379	54.42%	8,047
Day	1,999	71.60%	666	23.85%	127	4.55%	1,333	47.74%	2,792
Deuel	1,704	76.24%	416	18.61%	115	5.15%	1,288	57.63%	2,235
Dewey	694	36.41%	1,149	60.28%	63	3.31%	-455	-23.87%	1,906
Douglas	1,475	90.38%	121	7.41%	36	2.21%	1,354	82.97%	1,632
Edmunds	1,533	81.37%	280	14.86%	71	3.77%	1,253	66.51%	1,884
Fall River	2,789	71.90%	836	21.55%	254	6.55%	1,953	50.35%	3,879
Faulk	942	84.56%	133	11.94%	39	3.50%	809	72.62%	1,114
Grant	2,721	76.54%	671	18.87%	163	4.59%	2,050	57.67%	3,555
Gregory	1,732	80.56%	358	16.65%	60	2.79%	1,374	63.91%	2,150
Haakon	1,015	92.69%	62	5.66%	18	1.64%	953	87.03%	1,095
Hamlin	2,384	81.70%	421	14.43%	113	3.87%	1,963	67.27%	2,918
Hand	1,485	83.05%	245	13.70%	58	3.24%	1,240	69.35%	1,788
Hanson	1,758	78.55%	404	18.05%	76	3.40%	1,354	60.50%	2,238
Harding	690	89.38%	50	6.48%	32	4.15%	640	82.90%	772
Hughes	6,155	72.46%	2,002	23.57%	337	3.97%	4,153	48.89%	8,494
Hutchinson	3,002	84.37%	449	12.62%	107	3.01%	2,553	71.75%	3,558
Hyde	559	81.84%	105	15.37%	19	2.78%	454	66.47%	683
Jackson	708	65.80%	334	31.04%	34	3.16%	374	34.76%	1,076
Jerauld	752	78.17%	186	19.33%	24	2.49%	566	58.84%	962
Jones	481	83.65%	68	11.83%	26	4.52%	413	71.83%	575
Kingsbury	2,034	76.29%	541	20.29%	91	3.41%	1,493	56.00%	2,666
Lake	4,014	71.81%	1,342	24.01%	234	4.19%	2,672	47.80%	5,590
Lawrence	8,818	66.82%	3,433	26.01%	946	7.17%	5,385	40.80%	13,197
Lincoln	21,904	71.15%	7,421	24.11%	1,460	4.74%	14,483	47.05%	30,785
Lyman	1,043	67.73%	445	28.90%	52	3.38%	598	38.83%	1,540
Marshall	1,422	68.96%	555	26.92%	85	4.12%	867	42.05%	2,062
McCook	2,140	78.02%	486	17.72%	117	4.27%	1,654	60.30%	2,743
McPherson	1,074	85.92%	133	10.64%	43	3.44%	941	75.28%	1,250
Meade	9,489	73.42%	2,468	19.10%	967	7.48%	7,021	54.33%	12,924
Mellette	437	58.74%	275	36.96%	32	4.30%	162	21.77%	744
Miner	836	76.84%	200	18.38%	52	4.78%	636	58.46%	1,088
Minnehaha	55,106	63.16%	27,568	31.60%	4,569	5.24%	27,538	31.56%	87,243
Moody	2,041	66.44%	915	29.79%	116	3.78%	1,126	36.65%	3,072
Oglala Lakota	257	8.14%	2,824	89.40%	78	2.47%	-2,567	-81.26%	3,159
Pennington	34,684	63.96%	15,847	29.22%	3,697	6.82%	18,837	34.74%	54,228
Perkins	1,302	82.51%	191	12.10%	85	5.39%	1,111	70.41%	1,578
Potter	1,155	87.17%	133	10.04%	37	2.79%	1,022	77.13%	1,325
Roberts	2,593	62.53%	1,410	34.00%	144	3.47%	1,183	28.53%	4,147
Sanborn	874	78.53%	197	17.70%	42	3.77%	677	60.83%	1,113
Spink	2,229	74.42%	634	21.17%	132	4.41%	1,595	53.26%	2,995
Stanley	1,234	77.61%	308	19.37%	48	3.02%	926	58.24%	1,590
Sully	735	81.94%	133	14.83%	29	3.23%	602	67.11%	897
Todd	479	19.46%	1,915	77.78%	68	2.76%	-1,436	-58.33%	2,462
Tripp	2,125	82.33%	377	14.61%	79	3.06%	1,748	67.73%	2,581
Turner	3,474	79.59%	707	16.20%	184	4.22%	2,767	63.39%	4,365
Union	6,013	72.19%	1,941	23.30%	375	4.50%	4,072	48.89%	8,329
Walworth	1,978	79.79%	420	16.94%	81	3.27%	1,558	62.85%	2,479
Yankton	6,737	66.98%	2,748	27.32%	573	5.70%	3,989	39.66%	10,058
Ziebach	361	40.74%	473	53.39%	52	5.87%	-112	-12.64%	886
Totals	272,378	68.01%	107,494	26.84%	20,622	5.15%	164,884	41.17%	400,494

Counties that flipped from Democratic to Tied

- Corson (largest city: McLaughlin)
