= 2026 South Dakota Secretary of State election =

- November 3, 2026
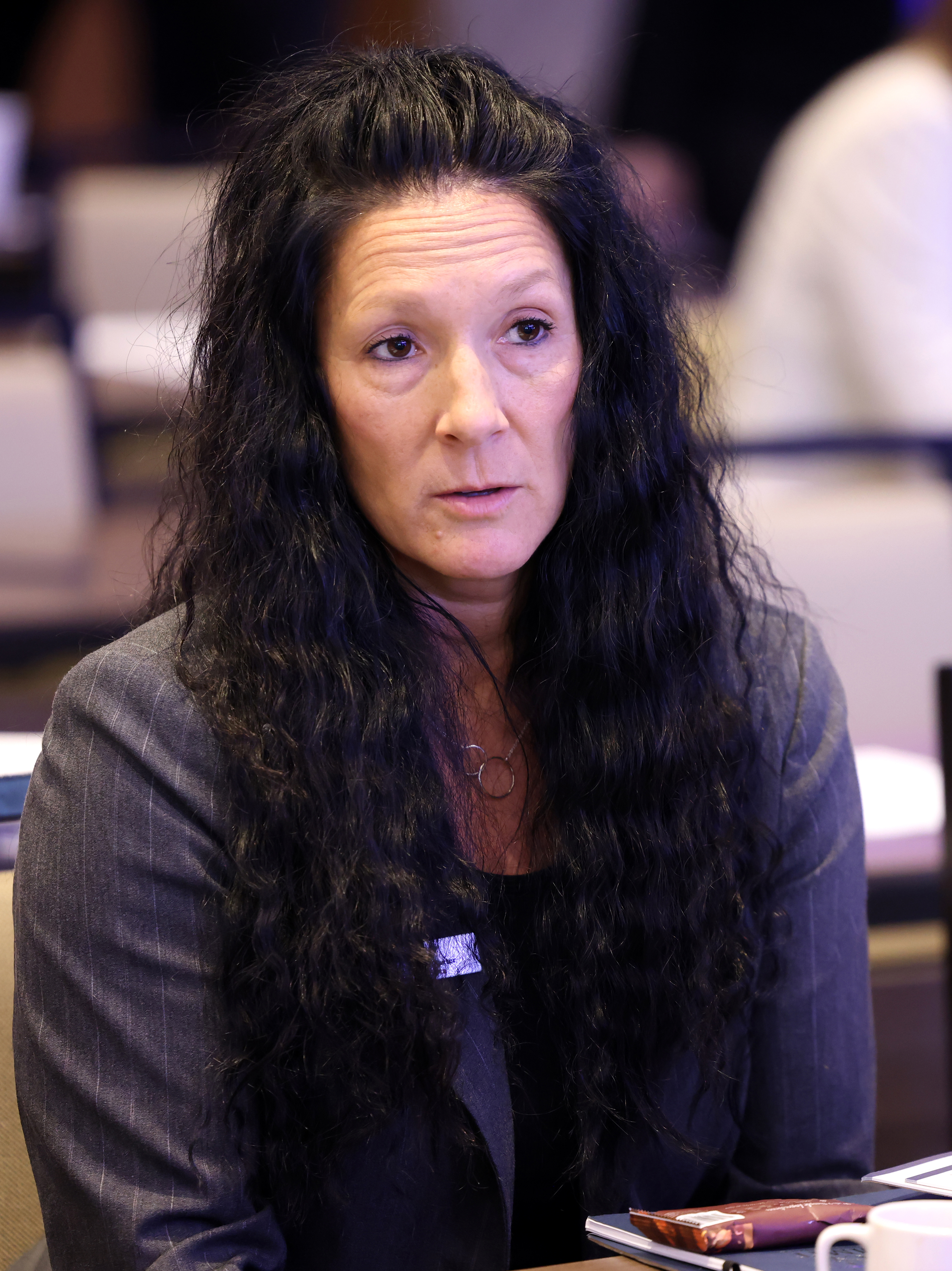

| Candidate | Heather Baxter | Terrence Davis | Tamara Lesnar |
| Party | Republican | Democratic | Libertarian |
| Popular vote | 172,366 | 106,561 | 16,261 |
| Percentage | 58.39% | 36.10% | 5.51% |
- Baxter: 40–50% 50–60% 60–70% 70–80% 80–90% Davis: 50–60% 60–70% 70–80% 80–90%
Secretary of State before election
Monae Johnson
Republican
Elected Secretary of State
Heather Baxter
Republican

The 2026 South Dakota Secretary of State election was held on November 3, 2026, to elect the Secretary of State of South Dakota. Incumbent Republican secretary of state Monae Johnson ran for re-election, but lost renomination to state representative Heather Baxter at the state Republican convention.

== Republican primary ==
=== Candidates ===
==== Nominee ====
- Heather Baxter, state representative from the 34th district (2025–present)

Eliminated at convention

- Monae Johnson, incumbent secretary of state

== Democratic primary ==
=== Candidates ===
==== Nominee ====
- Terrence Davis, former state trooper

== Third-party and independent candidates ==
=== Candidates ===
==== Declared ====
- Tamara Lesnar (Libertarian), nominee for U.S. Senate in 2022

== General election ==
=== Predictions ===
| Source | Ranking | As of |
|---|---|---|
| Sabato's Crystal Ball | Safe R | October 25, 2025 |

=== Post-convention endorsements ===
Heather Baxter (R)

Political parties

- South Dakota Republican Party
Terrence Davis (D)

Statewide officials

- Monae Johnson, secretary of state of South Dakota (2022–present) (Republican)

Labor unions

- AFSCME Council 65

=== Results ===
2026 South Dakota Secretary of State election
| Party | Candidate | Votes | % | ±% |
|---|---|---|---|---|
| Republican | Heather Baxter | 172,366 | 58.39 | –5.51 |
| Democratic | Terrence Davis | 106,561 | 36.10 | – |
| Libertarian | Tamara Lesnar | 16,261 | 5.51 | N/A |
| Total votes | | 295,188 | 100.00 | N/A |
| Republican hold | | | | |

==== By county ====
| County | Heather Baxter Republican | | Terrence Davis Democratic | | Tamara Lesnar Libertarian | | Margin | | Total |
| County | # | % | # | % | # | % | # | % | Total |
|---|---|---|---|---|---|---|---|---|---|
| Aurora | 610 | 65.24% | 277 | 29.63% | 48 | 5.13% | 333 | 35.61% | 935 |
| Beadle | 3,051 | 65.08% | 1,426 | 30.42% | 211 | 4.50% | 1,625 | 34.66% | 4,688 |
| Bennett | 459 | 56.32% | 325 | 39.88% | 31 | 3.80% | 134 | 16.44% | 815 |
| Bon Homme | 1,413 | 68.73% | 542 | 26.36% | 101 | 4.91% | 871 | 42.36% | 2,056 |
| Brookings | 5,907 | 53.86% | 4,326 | 39.45% | 734 | 6.69% | 1,581 | 14.42% | 10,967 |
| Brown | 6,676 | 57.35% | 4,323 | 37.14% | 641 | 5.51% | 2,353 | 20.21% | 11,640 |
| Brule | 1,102 | 65.09% | 509 | 30.06% | 82 | 4.84% | 593 | 35.03% | 1,693 |
| Buffalo | 112 | 30.35% | 231 | 62.60% | 26 | 7.05% | -119 | -32.25% | 369 |
| Butte | 2,547 | 75.02% | 636 | 18.73% | 212 | 6.24% | 1,911 | 56.29% | 3,395 |
| Campbell | 479 | 83.16% | 76 | 13.19% | 21 | 3.65% | 403 | 69.97% | 576 |
| Charles Mix | 1,682 | 64.84% | 809 | 31.19% | 103 | 3.97% | 873 | 33.65% | 2,594 |
| Clark | 1,066 | 73.72% | 301 | 20.82% | 79 | 5.46% | 765 | 52.90% | 1,446 |
| Clay | 1,547 | 39.00% | 2,210 | 55.71% | 210 | 5.29% | -663 | -16.71% | 3,967 |
| Codington | 6,052 | 63.44% | 2,922 | 30.63% | 566 | 5.93% | 3,130 | 32.81% | 9,540 |
| Corson | 369 | 50.83% | 310 | 42.70% | 47 | 6.47% | 59 | 8.13% | 726 |
| Custer | 3,158 | 68.65% | 1,177 | 25.59% | 265 | 5.76% | 1,981 | 43.07% | 4,600 |
| Davison | 3,667 | 62.44% | 1,953 | 33.25% | 253 | 4.31% | 1,714 | 29.18% | 5,873 |
| Day | 1,246 | 57.10% | 770 | 35.29% | 166 | 7.61% | 476 | 21.81% | 2,182 |
| Deuel | 1,135 | 69.29% | 416 | 25.40% | 87 | 5.31% | 719 | 43.89% | 1,638 |
| Dewey | 479 | 38.11% | 713 | 56.72% | 65 | 5.17% | -234 | -18.62% | 1,257 |
| Douglas | 1,043 | 86.77% | 136 | 11.31% | 23 | 1.91% | 907 | 75.46% | 1,202 |
| Edmunds | 1,014 | 73.58% | 306 | 22.21% | 58 | 4.21% | 708 | 51.38% | 1,378 |
| Fall River | 2,256 | 69.74% | 772 | 23.86% | 207 | 6.40% | 1,484 | 45.87% | 3,235 |
| Faulk | 622 | 78.44% | 132 | 16.65% | 39 | 4.92% | 490 | 61.79% | 793 |
| Grant | 1,898 | 68.37% | 739 | 26.62% | 139 | 5.01% | 1,159 | 41.75% | 2,776 |
| Gregory | 1,133 | 74.34% | 322 | 21.13% | 69 | 4.53% | 811 | 53.22% | 1,524 |
| Haakon | 674 | 83.42% | 104 | 12.87% | 30 | 3.71% | 570 | 70.54% | 808 |
| Hamlin | 1,622 | 74.23% | 464 | 21.24% | 99 | 4.53% | 1,158 | 53.00% | 2,185 |
| Hand | 951 | 76.88% | 246 | 19.89% | 40 | 3.23% | 705 | 56.99% | 1,237 |
| Hanson | 814 | 74.20% | 239 | 21.79% | 44 | 4.01% | 575 | 52.42% | 1,097 |
| Harding | 553 | 85.87% | 58 | 9.01% | 33 | 5.12% | 495 | 76.86% | 644 |
| Hughes | 3,651 | 58.39% | 2,292 | 36.65% | 310 | 4.96% | 1,359 | 21.73% | 6,253 |
| Hutchinson | 1,856 | 75.23% | 508 | 20.59% | 103 | 4.18% | 1,348 | 54.64% | 2,467 |
| Hyde | 372 | 74.70% | 107 | 21.49% | 19 | 3.82% | 265 | 53.21% | 498 |
| Jackson | 500 | 65.88% | 226 | 29.78% | 33 | 4.35% | 274 | 36.10% | 759 |
| Jerauld | 451 | 68.23% | 183 | 27.69% | 27 | 4.08% | 268 | 40.54% | 661 |
| Jones | 356 | 80.73% | 55 | 12.47% | 30 | 6.80% | 301 | 68.25% | 441 |
| Kingsbury | 1,324 | 66.87% | 554 | 27.98% | 102 | 5.15% | 770 | 38.89% | 1,980 |
| Lake | 2,594 | 61.31% | 1,406 | 33.23% | 231 | 5.46% | 1,188 | 28.08% | 4,231 |
| Lawrence | 6,276 | 60.54% | 3,410 | 32.90% | 680 | 6.56% | 2,866 | 27.65% | 10,366 |
| Lincoln | 14,410 | 56.55% | 9,788 | 38.41% | 1,282 | 5.03% | 4,622 | 18.14% | 25,480 |
| Lyman | 679 | 62.52% | 349 | 32.14% | 58 | 5.34% | 330 | 30.39% | 1,086 |
| Marshall | 895 | 56.25% | 589 | 37.02% | 107 | 6.73% | 306 | 19.23% | 1,591 |
| McCook | 1,435 | 68.46% | 563 | 26.86% | 98 | 4.68% | 872 | 41.60% | 2,096 |
| McPherson | 795 | 81.54% | 149 | 15.28% | 31 | 3.18% | 646 | 66.26% | 975 |
| Meade | 6,784 | 69.37% | 2,372 | 24.26% | 623 | 6.37% | 4,412 | 45.12% | 9,779 |
| Mellette | 349 | 58.95% | 205 | 34.63% | 38 | 6.42% | 144 | 24.32% | 592 |
| Miner | 553 | 67.11% | 226 | 27.43% | 45 | 5.46% | 327 | 39.68% | 824 |
| Minnehaha | 31,662 | 49.23% | 29,221 | 45.44% | 3,430 | 5.33% | 2,441 | 3.80% | 64,313 |
| Moody | 1,392 | 58.56% | 872 | 36.68% | 113 | 4.75% | 520 | 21.88% | 2,377 |
| Oglala Lakota | 217 | 9.85% | 1,830 | 83.11% | 155 | 7.04% | -1,613 | -73.25% | 2,202 |
| Pennington | 20,487 | 56.28% | 13,469 | 37.00% | 2,448 | 6.72% | 7,018 | 19.28% | 36,404 |
| Perkins | 992 | 81.31% | 170 | 13.93% | 58 | 4.75% | 822 | 67.38% | 1,220 |
| Potter | 711 | 78.74% | 168 | 18.60% | 24 | 2.66% | 543 | 60.13% | 903 |
| Roberts | 1,559 | 54.36% | 1,149 | 40.06% | 160 | 5.58% | 410 | 14.30% | 2,868 |
| Sanborn | 552 | 69.43% | 212 | 26.67% | 31 | 3.90% | 340 | 42.77% | 795 |
| Spink | 1,447 | 66.13% | 624 | 28.52% | 117 | 5.35% | 823 | 37.61% | 2,188 |
| Stanley | 855 | 65.92% | 381 | 29.38% | 61 | 4.70% | 474 | 36.55% | 1,297 |
| Sully | 517 | 74.28% | 144 | 20.69% | 35 | 5.03% | 373 | 53.59% | 696 |
| Todd | 333 | 20.45% | 1,193 | 73.28% | 102 | 6.27% | -860 | -52.83% | 1,628 |
| Tripp | 1,495 | 79.39% | 314 | 16.68% | 74 | 3.93% | 1,181 | 62.72% | 1,883 |
| Turner | 2,197 | 69.57% | 790 | 25.02% | 171 | 5.41% | 1,407 | 44.55% | 3,158 |
| Union | 3,687 | 64.51% | 1,762 | 30.83% | 266 | 4.65% | 1,925 | 33.68% | 5,715 |
| Walworth | 1,240 | 77.07% | 310 | 19.27% | 59 | 3.67% | 930 | 57.80% | 1,609 |
| Yankton | 4,136 | 55.47% | 2,942 | 39.46% | 378 | 5.07% | 1,194 | 16.01% | 7,456 |
| Ziebach | 270 | 48.13% | 258 | 45.99% | 33 | 5.88% | 12 | 2.14% | 561 |
| Totals | 172,366 | 58.39% | 106,561 | 36.10% | 16,261 | 5.51% | 65,805 | 22.29% | 295,188 |

==== County that flipped from Democratic to Republican ====
- Ziebach (largest city: Dupree)
