= 2022 South Dakota Secretary of State election =

- November 8, 2022
Nominee	Monae Johnson	Thomas Cool
Party	Republican	Democratic
Popular vote	212,320	119,961
Percentage	63.90%	36.10%
- County results Johnson: 50–60% 60–70% 70–80% 80–90% >90% Cool: 50–60% 60–70% 70–80% 80–90%
Secretary of State before election
Steve Barnett
Republican
Elected Secretary of State
Monae Johnson
Republican

The 2022 South Dakota Secretary of State election was held on November 8, 2022, to elect the next secretary of state of South Dakota. Incumbent Republican Steve Barnett ran for re-election, but was defeated at the state convention by Monae Johnson.

== Republican primary ==
=== Candidates ===
==== Nominee ====
- Monae Johnson, secretary of state office worker

==== Eliminated at convention ====
- Steve Barnett, incumbent secretary of state (2019–2022)

== Democratic primary ==
=== Candidates ===
==== Nominee ====
- Thomas Cool, candidate for the South Dakota Senate in 2010, 2012, 2014, 2016, 2018, and 2020

== Libertarian convention ==
=== Candidates ===
==== Nominee ====
- Kurt Evans, teacher

== General election ==
=== Predictions ===
Source	Ranking	As of
Sabato's Crystal Ball	Safe R	December 1, 2021
Elections Daily	Safe R	November 7, 2022

=== Results ===
2022 South Dakota Secretary of State election
Party	Candidate	Votes	%	±%
Republican	Monae Johnson	212,348	63.90%	−1.27%
Democratic	Thomas Cool	119,975	36.10%	+1.27%
Total votes		332,323	100.00%	N/A
Republican hold				

==== By county ====
County	Monae Johnson Republican		Thomas Cool Democratic		Margin		Total
County	#	%	#	%	#	%	Total
Aurora	785	69.10%	351	30.90%	434	38.20%	1,136
Beadle	3,807	67.99%	1,792	32.01%	2,015	35.99%	5,599
Bennett	593	61.71%	368	38.29%	225	23.41%	961
Bon Homme	1,717	70.63%	714	29.37%	1,003	41.26%	2,431
Brookings	6,874	58.58%	4,861	41.42%	2,013	17.15%	11,735
Brown	8,007	60.70%	5,184	39.30%	2,823	21.40%	13,191
Brule	1,330	67.07%	653	32.93%	677	34.14%	1,983
Buffalo	134	35.45%	244	64.55%	-110	-29.10%	378
Butte	3,225	79.65%	824	20.35%	2,401	59.30%	4,049
Campbell	542	85.09%	95	14.91%	447	70.17%	637
Charles Mix	1,919	64.35%	1,063	35.65%	856	28.71%	2,982
Clark	1,091	74.12%	381	25.88%	710	48.23%	1,472
Clay	2,029	45.64%	2,417	54.36%	-388	-8.73%	4,446
Codington	7,162	69.41%	3,157	30.59%	4,005	38.81%	10,319
Corson	513	57.13%	385	42.87%	128	14.25%	898
Custer	3,660	74.65%	1,243	25.35%	2,417	49.30%	4,903
Davison	4,680	67.73%	2,230	32.27%	2,450	35.46%	6,910
Day	1,456	61.31%	919	38.69%	537	22.61%	2,375
Deuel	1,359	71.56%	540	28.44%	819	43.13%	1,899
Dewey	628	41.53%	884	58.47%	-256	-16.93%	1,512
Douglas	1,189	85.17%	207	14.83%	982	70.34%	1,396
Edmunds	1,215	76.22%	379	23.78%	836	52.45%	1,594
Fall River	2,646	74.66%	898	25.34%	1,748	49.32%	3,544
Faulk	712	78.67%	193	21.33%	519	57.35%	905
Grant	2,177	71.85%	853	28.15%	1,324	43.70%	3,030
Gregory	1,497	76.42%	462	23.58%	1,035	52.83%	1,959
Haakon	856	90.11%	94	9.89%	762	80.21%	950
Hamlin	2,021	78.58%	551	21.42%	1,470	57.15%	2,572
Hand	1,134	78.64%	308	21.36%	826	57.28%	1,442
Hanson	1,172	76.01%	370	23.99%	802	52.01%	1,542
Harding	605	92.93%	46	7.07%	559	85.87%	651
Hughes	4,563	64.03%	2,563	35.97%	2,000	28.07%	7,126
Hutchinson	2,342	78.04%	659	21.96%	1,683	56.08%	3,001
Hyde	412	75.05%	137	24.95%	275	50.09%	549
Jackson	618	68.90%	279	31.10%	339	37.79%	897
Jerauld	539	67.04%	265	32.96%	274	34.08%	804
Jones	391	85.56%	66	14.44%	325	71.12%	457
Kingsbury	1,673	69.91%	720	30.09%	953	39.82%	2,393
Lake	3,007	64.17%	1,679	35.83%	1,328	28.34%	4,686
Lawrence	7,812	67.10%	3,831	32.90%	3,981	34.19%	11,643
Lincoln	16,642	62.66%	9,916	37.34%	6,726	25.33%	26,558
Lyman	831	67.29%	404	32.71%	427	34.57%	1,235
Marshall	1,036	57.97%	751	42.03%	285	15.95%	1,787
McCook	1,735	72.17%	669	27.83%	1,066	44.34%	2,404
McPherson	895	83.96%	171	16.04%	724	67.92%	1,066
Meade	8,607	75.91%	2,732	24.09%	5,875	51.81%	11,339
Mellette	374	61.82%	231	38.18%	143	23.64%	605
Miner	629	68.00%	296	32.00%	333	36.00%	925
Minnehaha	38,912	55.24%	31,534	44.76%	7,378	10.47%	70,446
Moody	1,553	61.31%	980	38.69%	573	22.62%	2,533
Oglala Lakota	291	12.11%	2,112	87.89%	-1,821	-75.78%	2,403
Pennington	28,228	64.94%	15,242	35.06%	12,986	29.87%	43,470
Perkins	1,110	84.99%	196	15.01%	914	69.98%	1,306
Potter	851	80.89%	201	19.11%	650	61.79%	1,052
Roberts	1,970	58.27%	1,411	41.73%	559	16.53%	3,381
Sanborn	692	73.07%	255	26.93%	437	46.15%	947
Spink	1,723	67.65%	824	32.35%	899	35.30%	2,547
Stanley	993	71.54%	395	28.46%	598	43.08%	1,388
Sully	584	77.56%	169	22.44%	415	55.11%	753
Todd	435	23.10%	1,448	76.90%	-1,013	-53.80%	1,883
Tripp	1,800	81.19%	417	18.81%	1,383	62.38%	2,217
Turner	2,731	73.87%	966	26.13%	1,765	47.74%	3,697
Union	4,653	71.54%	1,851	28.46%	2,802	43.08%	6,504
Walworth	1,520	77.71%	436	22.29%	1,084	55.42%	1,956
Yankton	5,142	61.77%	3,182	38.23%	1,960	23.55%	8,324
Ziebach	319	49.84%	321	50.16%	-2	-0.31%	640
Totals	212,348	63.90%	119,975	36.10%	92,373	27.80%	332,323

Counties that flipped from Democratic to Republican

- Corson (largest city: McLaughlin)
