= Long View Stock Farm =

- U.S. National Register of Historic Places
- Location within South Dakota Location within the United States
- Location: 22182 361st Avenue, Gann Valley, South Dakota
- Coordinates: 44°10′06.3″N 98°57′46.2″W
- Area: 52 acres (21 ha)
- Built: 1910
- NRHP reference No.: 100002808
- Added to NRHP: August 24, 2018

Long View Stock Farm is a historic farmstead located in rural Gann Valley, South Dakota, United States. Originally established in 1910 on 52 acres (21 ha), the farm now spans across 640 acres (260 ha) in Eden Township.

The farmstead was purchased by the Sinkie family in 1902, who built a farmhouse in 1910. The barn was built in 1917. In 1924, a storm severely damaged the barn, destroying the hayloft, which was rebuilt in 1927. The Sinkies raised horses and livestock, including chickens and cattle; grew crops; and ran a dairy.

On August 24, 2018, 52 acres (21 ha) of the original farmland were listed on the National Register of Historic Places. This area includes the barn, farmhouse, cellar, garage, two chicken coops, and an outhouse.

== See also ==
- National Register of Historic Places listings in Buffalo County, South Dakota
