= Monae =

Monae is a given name and surname. Notable people with the name include:

- Janelle Monáe (born 1985), American singer, songwriter, rapper, and actress
- Monae Johnson (fl. 2022), American politician
- Monae' Nichols (born 1998), American athlete
