= Mitch Krebs =

American journalist

Mitch Krebs is an American former news co-anchor at KSFY-TV in Sioux Falls, South Dakota. He is married to former South Dakota Secretary of State Shantel Krebs (R).

== Biography ==
Mitch Krebs was born in Fort Dodge, Iowa. He grew up in Austin, Minnesota and attended the University of Minnesota. In 1996, Krebs joined the news team at KSFY-TV. In 1999, he and Nancy Naeve became co-anchors of the 6:00pm and 10:00pm newscasts at KSFY-TV. He left KSFY-TV in 2007.

From February 2007 to November 2008, Krebs served as press secretary for South Dakota Governor Mike Rounds.

He then became Assistant Vice President of Media and Community Relations at Avera McKennan Hospital. In 2010 he left Avera to become Public Policy Director at POET, the world's largest biofuels producer. From August 2013 to November 2014 Krebs was Communications Director for Rounds for Senate. In 2018, he was appointed the program director of rural healthcare for the Helmsley Charitable Trust.

Krebs currently serves as founder and principal for Herd Wisdom LLC, a public affairs and advocacy firm.

He lives in rural Stanley County, South Dakota with his wife, Shantel Krebs.
