= 2026 United States House of Representatives election in South Dakota =

2026 United States House of Representatives election in South Dakota's at-large district
- November 3, 2026
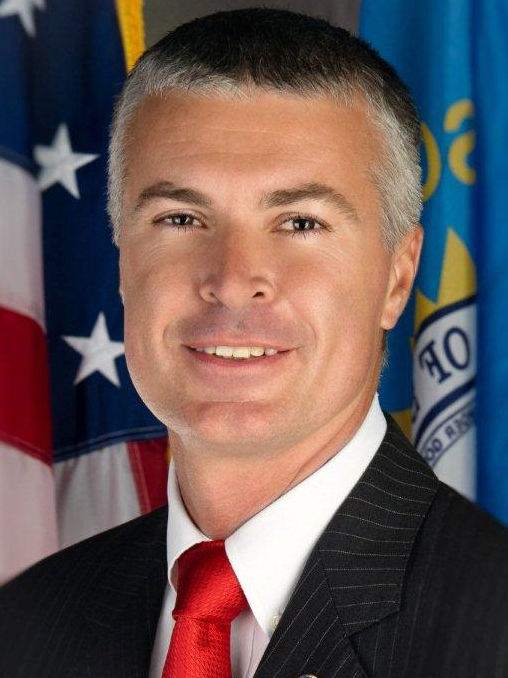

Nominee	Marty Jackley	Nikki Gronli
Party	Republican	Democratic
Popular vote	195,589	109,997
Percentage	64.00%	36.00%
- Jackley: 50–60% 60–70% 70–80% 80–90% >90% Gronli: 50–60% 70–80% 80–90%
U.S. Representative before election
Dusty Johnson
Republican
Elected U.S. Representative
Marty Jackley
Republican

The 2026 United States House of Representatives election in South Dakota was held on November 3, 2026, to elect a member of the United States House of Representatives to represent the state of South Dakota from its at-large congressional district. The election coincided with other elections held on the same date. Primary elections were held on June 2, 2026, and in races where no candidate receives at least 35% in a primary, runoff elections took place on July 28.

Incumbent Republican representative Dusty Johnson was re-elected with 72.0% of the vote in 2024. In June 2025, he announced his intention to retire from the seat and instead run for governor of South Dakota.

Primary elections were held on June 2, 2026. State attorney general Marty Jackley received 79.2% of the vote against minimal opposition and former USDA official Nikki Gronli ran unopposed for their respective party's nominations. In the general election, Jackley defeated Gronli with the lowest margin of victory for this seat since 2018.

== Republican primary ==
=== Candidates ===
==== Nominee ====
- Marty Jackley, South Dakota Attorney General (2009–2019, 2023–present) and candidate for governor in 2018

==== Eliminated in primary ====
- James Bialota Jr., small business owner and real estate investor

==== Withdrawn ====
- Casey Crabtree, state senator from the 8th district (2020–present) and former Majority Leader of the South Dakota Senate (endorsed Jackley)

==== Declined ====
- Dusty Johnson, incumbent U.S. representative (ran for governor)

=== Endorsements ===
James Bialota

State legislators

- Aaron Aylward, state representative from the 6th district (2021–present)
- Phil Jensen, state representative from the 33rd district (2009–2013, 2021–present) and former state senator from the 33rd district (2013–2021)
Marty Jackley

Executive branch officials

- Donald Trump, 45th and 47th president of the United States (2017–2021, 2025–present)

State legislators

- Casey Crabtree, state senator from the 8th district (2020–present) and former candidate for this seat

Organizations

- U.S. Chamber of Commerce

=== Fundraising ===
Campaign finance reports as of May 13, 2026
Candidate	Raised	Spent	Cash on hand
Casey Crabtree (R)	$254,650	$183,634	$71,016
Marty Jackley (R)	$1,331,302	$264,431	$1,066,870
Source: Federal Election Commission

=== Polling ===
Poll source	Date(s) administered	Sample size (Note: Key: A – all adults RV – registered voters LV – likely voters V – unclear)	Margin of error	James Bialota	Marty Jackley	Undecided
Mason-Dixon Polling & Strategy (Note: Poll sponsored by South Dakota News Watch and the Chiesman Center for Democracy at the University of South Dakota)	April 7–11, 2026	500 (RV)	± 4.5%	12%	68%	20%
Emerson College (Note: Poll sponsored by KELO-TV and Nexstar Media)	March 7–9, 2026	415 (LV)	± 4.8%	7%	51%	41%

Hypothetical polling

Poll source	Date(s) administered	Sample size	Margin of error	Casey Crabtree	Marty Jackley	Tony Venhuizen	Undecided
Guidant Polling & Strategy (R)	June 17–19, 2025	400 (LV)	± 4.9%	5%	48%	5%	42%

Poll source	Date(s) administered	Sample size	Margin of error	James Bialota	Casey Crabtree	Marty Jackley	Undecided
Mason-Dixon Polling & Strategy	October 16–20, 2025	502 (RV)	± 4.5%	2%	5%	57%	36%

=== Results ===
Primary results by county: Jackley: 60–70%; 70–80%; 80–90%

Republican primary results
Party	Candidate	Votes	%
Republican	Marty Jackley	103,074	79.2
Republican	James Bialota Jr.	27,100	20.8
Total votes		130,174	100.0

== Democratic primary ==
=== Candidates ===
==== Nominee ====
- Nikki Gronli, former South Dakota state director for USDA Rural Development (2022–2025) and former vice chair of the South Dakota Democratic Party

==== Withdrawn ====
- Billy Mawhiney, nonprofit executive

=== Endorsements ===
Nikki Gronli

Executive branch officials

- Joe Biden, 46th president of the United States (2021-2025) (Note: Endorsement received after the first round of primary voting took place.)

=== Fundraising ===
Campaign finance reports as of May 13, 2025
Candidate	Raised	Spent	Cash on hand
Nikki Gronli (D)	$213,223	$110,642	$102,581
Source: Federal Election Commission

== Independents ==
=== Candidates ===
==== Filed paperwork ====
- Jack Pittman

== General election ==
=== Predictions ===
Source	Ranking	As of
Decision Desk HQ	Safe R	July 14, 2026
The Cook Political Report	Solid R	July 10, 2025
Inside Elections	Solid R	July 10, 2025
Sabato's Crystal Ball	Safe R	July 10, 2025

=== Post-primary endorsements ===
Nikki Gronli (D)

Labor unions

- AFSCME Council 65

Organizations

- National Women's Political Caucus
Marty Jackley (R)

Organizations

- NRA Political Victory Fund

Newspapers

- Mitchell Daily Republic

=== Fundraising ===
Campaign finance reports as of September 30, 2026
Candidate	Raised	Spent	Cash on hand
Marty Jackley (R)	$1,736,314	$551,850	$1,184,464
Nicole Gronli (D)	$387,208	$294,065	$93,143
Source: Federal Election Commission

=== Polling ===
Poll source	Date(s) administered	Sample size	Margin of error	Marty Jackley (R)	Nikki Gronli (D)	Undecided
Mason-Dixon Polling & Strategy (Note: Poll conducted for South Dakota News Watch and the University of South Dakota)	October 12–14, 2026	500 (LV)	± 4.5%	60%	32%	9%
Lake Research Partners (D) (Note: Poll sponsored by Gronli's campaign)	August 26–30, 2026	(LV)	–	47%	43%	10%

=== Results ===
2026 South Dakota's at-large congressional district election
Party	Candidate	Votes	%	±%
Republican	Marty Jackley	195,589	64.00	–8.04
Democratic	Nikki Gronli	109,997	36.00	+8.04
Total votes		305,586	100.00	N/A
Republican hold				

==== By county ====
County	Marty Jackley Republican		Nikki Gronli Democratic		Margin		Total
County	#	%	#	%	#	%	Total
Aurora	709	73.62%	254	26.38%	455	47.25%	963
Beadle	3,498	72.62%	1,319	27.38%	2,179	45.24%	4,817
Bennett	519	62.08%	317	37.92%	202	24.16%	836
Bon Homme	1,610	75.34%	527	24.66%	1,083	50.68%	2,137
Brookings	6,853	59.78%	4,610	40.22%	2,243	19.57%	11,463
Brown	7,756	64.59%	4,252	35.41%	3,504	29.18%	12,008
Brule	1,259	71.57%	500	28.43%	759	43.15%	1,759
Buffalo	165	43.88%	211	56.12%	-46	-12.23%	376
Butte	2,755	80.06%	686	19.94%	2,069	60.13%	3,441
Campbell	514	85.95%	84	14.05%	430	71.91%	598
Charles Mix	1,867	70.24%	791	29.76%	1,076	40.48%	2,658
Clark	1,233	80.64%	296	19.36%	937	61.28%	1,529
Clay	1,822	44.81%	2,244	55.19%	-422	-10.38%	4,066
Codington	6,883	69.79%	2,979	30.21%	3,904	39.59%	9,862
Corson	395	54.41%	331	45.59%	64	8.82%	726
Custer	3,413	73.29%	1,244	26.71%	2,169	46.58%	4,657
Davison	4,231	70.13%	1,802	29.87%	2,429	40.26%	6,033
Day	1,477	65.59%	775	34.41%	702	31.17%	2,252
Deuel	1,278	76.16%	400	23.84%	878	52.32%	1,678
Dewey	556	43.57%	720	56.43%	-164	-12.85%	1,276
Douglas	1,089	87.96%	149	12.04%	940	75.93%	1,238
Edmunds	1,125	78.67%	305	21.33%	820	57.34%	1,430
Fall River	2,446	74.92%	819	25.08%	1,627	49.83%	3,265
Faulk	693	84.93%	123	15.07%	570	69.85%	816
Grant	2,140	73.87%	757	26.13%	1,383	47.74%	2,897
Gregory	1,243	79.27%	325	20.73%	918	58.55%	1,568
Haakon	745	89.44%	88	10.56%	657	78.87%	833
Hamlin	1,773	79.86%	447	20.14%	1,326	59.73%	2,220
Hand	1,045	82.67%	219	17.33%	826	65.35%	1,264
Hanson	923	78.35%	255	21.65%	668	56.71%	1,178
Harding	612	93.15%	45	6.85%	567	86.30%	657
Hughes	4,420	68.56%	2,027	31.44%	2,393	37.12%	6,447
Hutchinson	2,026	79.95%	508	20.05%	1,518	59.91%	2,534
Hyde	413	81.46%	94	18.54%	319	62.92%	507
Jackson	528	68.31%	245	31.69%	283	36.61%	773
Jerauld	525	76.09%	165	23.91%	360	52.17%	690
Jones	391	86.89%	59	13.11%	332	73.78%	450
Kingsbury	1,520	74.00%	534	26.00%	986	48.00%	2,054
Lake	3,010	68.25%	1,400	31.75%	1,610	36.51%	4,410
Lawrence	7,043	64.97%	3,797	35.03%	3,246	29.94%	10,840
Lincoln	16,237	61.70%	10,081	38.30%	6,156	23.39%	26,318
Lyman	779	69.93%	335	30.07%	444	39.86%	1,114
Marshall	1,063	64.19%	593	35.81%	470	28.38%	1,656
McCook	1,627	75.36%	532	24.64%	1,095	50.72%	2,159
McPherson	862	87.25%	126	12.75%	736	74.49%	988
Meade	7,507	75.12%	2,486	24.88%	5,021	50.25%	9,993
Mellette	389	64.62%	213	35.38%	176	29.24%	602
Miner	669	75.42%	218	24.58%	451	50.85%	887
Minnehaha	36,090	53.84%	30,943	46.16%	5,147	7.68%	67,033
Moody	1,607	65.19%	858	34.81%	749	30.39%	2,465
Oglala Lakota	308	13.86%	1,915	86.14%	-1,607	-72.29%	2,223
Pennington	23,677	61.97%	14,532	38.03%	9,145	23.93%	38,209
Perkins	1,066	84.94%	189	15.06%	877	69.88%	1,255
Potter	769	83.77%	149	16.23%	620	67.54%	918
Roberts	1,816	61.21%	1,151	38.79%	665	22.41%	2,967
Sanborn	599	72.61%	226	27.39%	373	45.21%	825
Spink	1,625	72.35%	621	27.65%	1,004	44.70%	2,246
Stanley	989	75.38%	323	24.62%	666	50.76%	1,312
Sully	604	85.19%	105	14.81%	499	70.38%	709
Todd	415	25.30%	1,225	74.70%	-810	-49.39%	1,640
Tripp	1,607	83.44%	319	16.56%	1,288	66.87%	1,926
Turner	2,465	76.24%	768	23.76%	1,697	52.49%	3,233
Union	3,907	67.30%	1,898	32.70%	2,009	34.61%	5,805
Walworth	1,328	81.27%	306	18.73%	1,022	62.55%	1,634
Yankton	4,795	62.33%	2,898	37.67%	1,897	24.66%	7,693
Ziebach	286	50.18%	284	49.82%	2	0.35%	570
Totals	195,589	64.00%	109,997	36.00%	85,592	28.01%	305,586

Counties that flipped from Republican to Democratic

- Clay (largest municipality: Vermillion)
- Dewey (largest municipality: North Eagle Butte)

== Notes ==
Partisan clients
