= Naeve =

Naeve is a surname. Notable people with the surname include:

- Milo Naeve (1931–2009), American art historian, curator, and museum administrator
- Nancy Naeve, American news co-anchor

== See also ==
- Meanings of minor-planet names: 20001–21000#337
