= Pam Nelson =

American politician

Member of the South Dakota Public Utilities Commission
- In office 1997–2003
- Preceded by: Kenneth D. Stofferahn
- Succeeded by: Gary W. Hanson

Member of the South Dakota Senate from the 11th district
- In office 1989–1996

Member of the South Dakota House of Representatives from the 11th district
- In office 1987–1988

Personal details
- Born: June 30, 1946 (age 80) Sioux Falls, South Dakota
- Party: Democratic
- Spouse: Vic Nelson
- Children: 2
- Profession: Businesswoman

Pamela A. Nelson (born June 30, 1946) is an American politician. She served in the South Dakota House of Representatives from 1979 to 1986 and the State Senate from 1989 to 1996, then served a term as a member of the South Dakota Public Utilities Commission from 1997 to 2003.
