= Kenneth D. Stofferahn =

American politician (1934–2024)

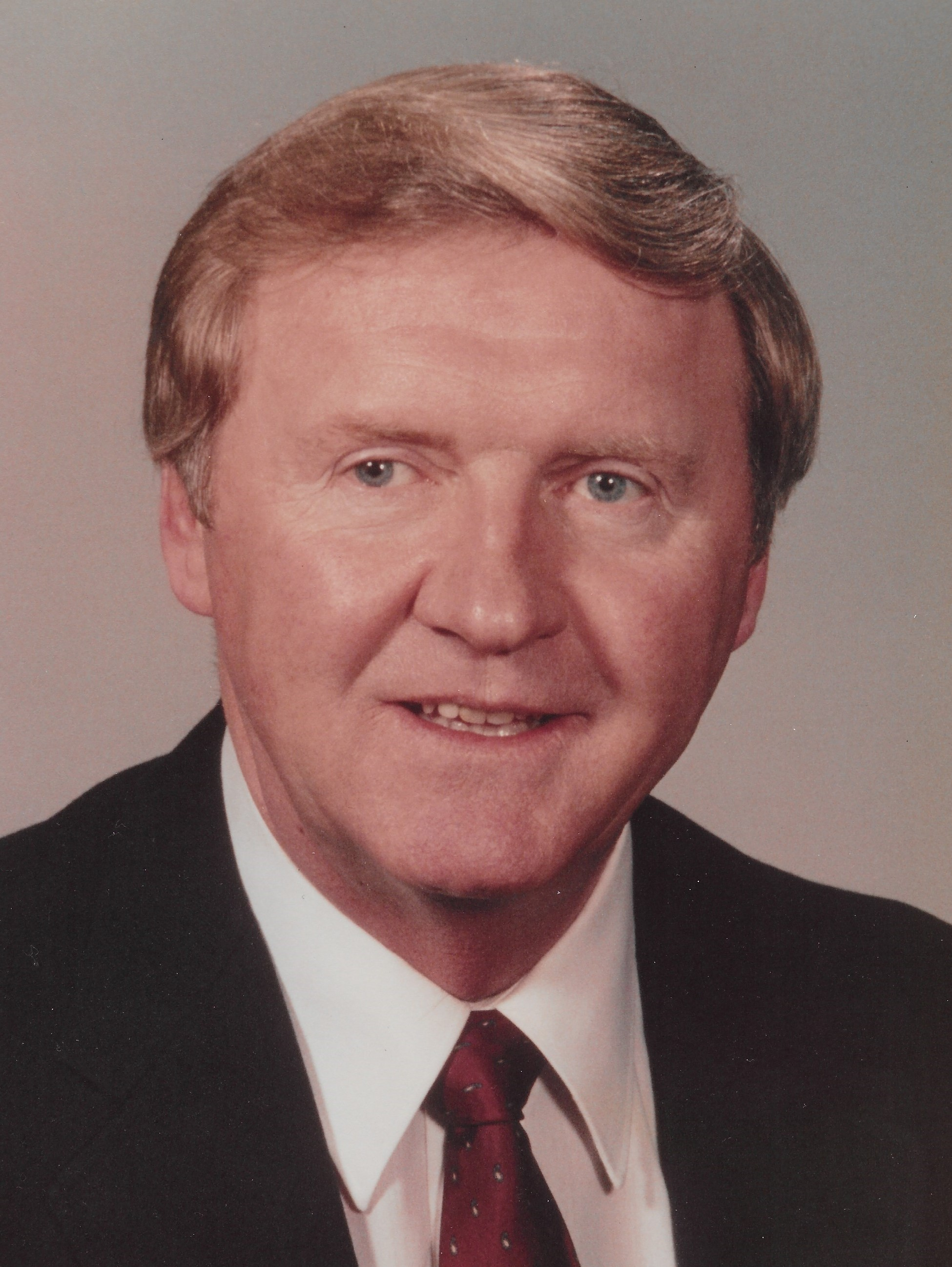

Member of the South Dakota House of Representatives
- In office 1975–1976

Public Utilities Commissioner (South Dakota)
- In office 1979–1997

Personal details
- Born: April 5, 1934 Lakefield, Minnesota, U.S.
- Died: March 18, 2024 (aged 89) Lincoln, Nebraska, U.S.
- Party: Republican; Democrat
- Education: South Dakota State University

Kenneth D. Stofferahn (April 5, 1934 – March 18, 2024) was an American politician. He served in the South Dakota House of Representatives as a Republican and on the South Dakota Public Utilities Commission as a Democrat.

== Life and career ==
Stofferahn was born in Lakefield, Minnesota. He farmed for many years near Humboldt, South Dakota, earned a Bachelor's degree from South Dakota State University in 1957, worked for the National Farmers Organization in the 1960's, and was active in South Dakota politics from 1972-1997.

Stofferahn ran for the United States Senate in the Republican primary in 1972, coming in fourth in a field of five (17%).

Stofferahn was elected to the South Dakota House of Representatives as a Republican in 1974, representing Minnehaha County from 1975-1976.

Having changed political party affiliation, Stofferahn ran for the United States Senate in the Democratic primary in 1978, coming in second (45%).

Stofferahn was elected to the South Dakota Public Utilities Commission as a Democrat in 1978, earning 55% of the statewide vote.

Stofferahn ran for the United States Congress (South Dakota, 2nd District) as a Democrat in 1980, coming in second (42%).

Stofferahn was re-elected to the South Dakota Public Utilities Commission as a Democrat in 1984, earning 61% of the statewide vote.

Stofferahn ran for Governor of South Dakota in the Democratic primary in 1986, coming in third (19%).

Stofferahn was re-elected to the South Dakota Public Utilities Commission as a Democrat in 1990, earning 52% of the statewide vote.

Stofferahn retired from politics in 1997. He died on March 18, 2024, at his home in Lincoln, Nebraska, at the age of 89.
