= Joyce Hazeltine =

American politician

25th Secretary of State of South Dakota
- In office 1987–2003
- Governor: George S. Mickelson; Walter D. Miller; William J. Janklow
- Preceded by: Alice Kundert
- Succeeded by: Chris Nelson

Personal details
- Born: July 16, 1935 Pierre, South Dakota, U.S.
- Died: September 30, 2016 (aged 81)
- Political party: Republican

Iola Joyce Hazeltine, known as Joyce Hazeltine, (16 July 1935 - 30 September 2016) was an American politician who was Secretary of State of South Dakota from 1987 until 2003.

== Early life and career ==
Hazeltine was born in Pierre on 16 July 1935, and attended Fort Pierre High School. She attained a teaching qualification from Huron College and afterwards went into teaching. In the 1970s, she set up her own business that provided management services.

== Political career ==
Hazeltine first ran for elected office as the Republican candidate for Secretary of State of South Dakota in 1974, losing to the Democratic Party's Lorna Herseth. She then later worked as an official in the South Dakota Legislature, including as secretary of the Senate.

In 1986, Hazeltine ran again as the Republican candidate for Secretary of State of South Dakota and won, taking office in 1987. She was re-elected for three more terms, serving in the role until 2003, making her the longest serving South Dakota Secretary of State at four terms and 16 years served total.

In 2002, she was term-limited and announced she would not be seeking re-election as Secretary of State and would instead seek to be the Republican candidate in the election for the Commissioner of School and Public Lands. However, she lost her bid for the Republican nomination to Alan Aker at the June Republican Party convention.

== Personal life ==
Hazeltine was married to her husband for 60 years and had three children. She was a supporter of the Black Hills Playhouse, becoming its board president in 2007.

She died of cancer on 30 September 2016, aged 81. Following her death, Governor Dennis Daugaard ordered all flags at the state capitol to be flown at half-mast in her honor.
