= 2022 South Dakota State Auditor election =

- November 8, 2022
Nominee	Rich Sattgast	Stephanie Marty	Rene Meyer
Party	Republican	Democratic	Libertarian
Popular vote	206,633	105,163	18,001
Percentage	62.65%	31.89%	5.46%
- County results Sattgast: 50–60% 60–70% 70–80% 80–90% Marty: 50–60% 60–70% 70–80% 80–90% Tie: 40–50%
State Auditor before election
Rich Sattgast
Republican
Elected State Auditor
Rich Sattgast
Republican

The 2022 South Dakota State Auditor election was held on November 8, 2022, to elect the State Auditor of South Dakota. Incumbent Republican Rich Sattgast was re-elected, defeating Democratic challenger Stephanie Marty and Libertarian nominee Rene Meyer.

== General election ==
On election day, November 8, 2022, incumbent state Auditor Rich Sattgast won re-election by a margin of 101,470 over Democratic nominee Stephanie Marty. Sattgast was sworn in on January 3, 2023.

=== Results ===
2022 South Dakota State Auditor election
Party	Candidate	Votes	%	±%
Republican	Rich Sattgast (incumbent)	206,633	62.65	−1.36
Democratic	Stephanie Marty	105,163	31.89	−4.10
Libertarian	Rene Meyer	18,001	5.46	N/A
Total votes		329,797	100.00	N/A
Republican hold				

==== By county ====
County	Rich Sattgast Republican		Stephanie Marty Democratic		Rene Meyer Libertarian		Margin		Total
County	#	%	#	%	#	%	#	%	Total
Aurora	771	68.29%	282	24.98%	76	6.73%	489	43.31%	1,129
Beadle	3,938	70.00%	1,464	26.02%	224	3.98%	2,474	43.97%	5,626
Bennett	547	56.86%	367	38.15%	48	4.99%	180	18.71%	962
Bon Homme	1,684	70.43%	606	25.35%	101	4.22%	1,078	45.09%	2,391
Brookings	6,602	57.13%	4,246	36.74%	709	6.13%	2,356	20.39%	11,557
Brown	7,838	59.62%	4,637	35.27%	671	5.10%	3,201	24.35%	13,146
Brule	1,339	67.90%	527	26.72%	106	5.38%	812	41.18%	1,972
Buffalo	130	34.03%	231	60.47%	21	5.50%	-101	-26.44%	382
Butte	3,016	74.82%	739	18.33%	276	6.85%	2,277	56.49%	4,031
Campbell	529	82.92%	84	13.17%	25	3.92%	445	69.75%	638
Charles Mix	1,963	66.97%	856	29.21%	112	3.82%	1,107	37.77%	2,931
Clark	1,082	73.11%	333	22.50%	65	4.39%	749	50.61%	1,480
Clay	2,017	45.51%	2,230	50.32%	185	4.17%	-213	-4.81%	4,432
Codington	6,857	67.01%	2,836	27.71%	540	5.28%	4,021	39.29%	10,233
Corson	461	51.62%	377	42.22%	55	6.16%	84	9.41%	893
Custer	3,435	70.22%	1,159	23.69%	298	6.09%	2,276	46.52%	4,892
Davison	4,663	68.02%	1,874	27.34%	318	4.64%	2,789	40.69%	6,855
Day	1,423	59.94%	826	34.79%	125	5.27%	597	25.15%	2,374
Deuel	1,325	70.22%	463	24.54%	99	5.25%	862	45.68%	1,887
Dewey	570	37.97%	841	56.03%	90	6.00%	-271	-18.05%	1,501
Douglas	1,185	86.18%	165	12.00%	25	1.82%	1,020	74.18%	1,375
Edmunds	1,205	76.12%	327	20.66%	51	3.22%	878	55.46%	1,583
Fall River	2,499	70.57%	800	22.59%	242	6.83%	1,699	47.98%	3,541
Faulk	723	79.71%	153	16.87%	31	3.42%	570	62.84%	907
Grant	2,084	69.51%	767	25.58%	147	4.90%	1,317	43.93%	2,998
Gregory	1,475	76.35%	377	19.51%	80	4.14%	1,098	56.83%	1,932
Haakon	826	87.97%	78	8.31%	35	3.73%	748	79.66%	939
Hamlin	1,975	77.39%	472	18.50%	105	4.11%	1,503	58.89%	2,552
Hand	1,124	77.89%	259	17.95%	60	4.16%	865	59.94%	1,443
Hanson	1,169	75.71%	310	20.08%	65	4.21%	859	55.63%	1,544
Harding	562	85.67%	57	8.69%	37	5.64%	505	76.98%	656
Hughes	5,118	70.44%	1,788	24.61%	360	4.95%	3,330	45.83%	7,266
Hutchinson	2,283	77.39%	548	18.58%	119	4.03%	1,735	58.81%	2,950
Hyde	429	77.16%	105	18.88%	22	3.96%	324	58.27%	556
Jackson	577	64.98%	263	29.62%	48	5.41%	314	35.36%	888
Jerauld	579	71.39%	208	25.65%	24	2.96%	371	45.75%	811
Jones	385	84.25%	50	10.94%	22	4.81%	335	73.30%	457
Kingsbury	1,696	71.38%	583	24.54%	97	4.08%	1,113	46.84%	2,376
Lake	3,001	64.84%	1,432	30.94%	195	4.21%	1,569	33.90%	4,628
Lawrence	7,544	64.56%	3,362	28.77%	780	6.67%	4,182	35.79%	11,686
Lincoln	16,689	63.47%	8,461	32.18%	1,144	4.35%	8,228	31.29%	26,294
Lyman	815	66.64%	346	28.29%	62	5.07%	469	38.35%	1,223
Marshall	1,018	57.94%	662	37.68%	77	4.38%	356	20.26%	1,757
McCook	1,707	71.48%	565	23.66%	116	4.86%	1,142	47.82%	2,388
McPherson	869	82.68%	144	13.70%	38	3.62%	725	68.98%	1,051
Meade	7,954	70.75%	2,386	21.22%	902	8.02%	5,568	49.53%	11,242
Mellette	353	59.03%	207	34.62%	38	6.35%	146	24.41%	598
Miner	651	70.84%	231	25.14%	37	4.03%	420	45.70%	919
Minnehaha	38,329	55.02%	27,615	39.64%	3,714	5.33%	10,714	15.38%	69,658
Moody	1,489	59.42%	882	35.20%	135	5.39%	607	24.22%	2,506
Oglala Lakota	199	8.32%	2,061	86.16%	132	5.52%	-1,862	-77.84%	2,392
Pennington	26,360	61.16%	13,745	31.89%	2,995	6.95%	12,615	29.27%	43,100
Perkins	1,019	78.57%	197	15.19%	81	6.25%	822	63.38%	1,297
Potter	853	81.63%	153	14.64%	39	3.73%	700	66.99%	1,045
Roberts	1,873	55.83%	1,331	39.67%	151	4.50%	542	16.15%	3,355
Sanborn	700	74.15%	201	21.29%	43	4.56%	499	52.86%	944
Spink	1,743	68.35%	691	27.10%	116	4.55%	1,052	41.25%	2,550
Stanley	1,020	72.49%	294	20.90%	93	6.61%	726	51.60%	1,407
Sully	598	78.17%	134	17.52%	33	4.31%	464	60.65%	765
Todd	364	19.41%	1,380	73.60%	131	6.99%	-1,016	-54.19%	1,875
Tripp	1,612	77.35%	364	17.47%	108	5.18%	1,248	59.88%	2,084
Turner	2,647	72.36%	799	21.84%	212	5.80%	1,848	50.52%	3,658
Union	4,457	68.59%	1,729	26.61%	312	4.80%	2,728	41.98%	6,498
Walworth	1,474	75.55%	401	20.55%	76	3.90%	1,073	55.00%	1,951
Yankton	4,921	60.03%	2,812	34.30%	465	5.67%	2,109	25.73%	8,198
Ziebach	290	45.17%	290	45.17%	62	9.66%	0	0.00%	642
Totals	206,633	62.65%	105,163	31.89%	18,001	5.46%	101,470	30.77%	329,797

Counties that flipped from Democratic to Republican

- Corson (largest city: McLaughlin)

Counties that flipped from Democratic to Tied

- Ziebach (largest city: Dupree)
