= Bank of Buffalo County =

Historic bank building in South Dakota, United States

- U.S. National Register of Historic Places
- Location: Main St., Gann Valley, South Dakota
- Coordinates: 44°01′59″N 98°59′12″W
- Area: less than one acre
- Built: 1921
- Built by: Hartwick Bros.
- Architectural style: Early Commercial
- NRHP reference No.: 99000206
- Added to NRHP: February 12, 1999

The Bank of Buffalo County, on Main St. in Gann Valley, South Dakota, is an Early Commercial-style building built in 1921. It was listed on the National Register of Historic Places in 1999.

It is a 23 by 35 feet (7.0 m × 10.7 m) building with brick veneer walls, on a concrete foundation. It has a brick parapet and a shed roof. It and several similar buildings were built with brick after a severe fire on Main St. in 1921. It has also served as the Bank of Gann Valley and as the Gann Valley Post Office.
