= Thomas Thorson =

American politician and businessman (1848–1915)

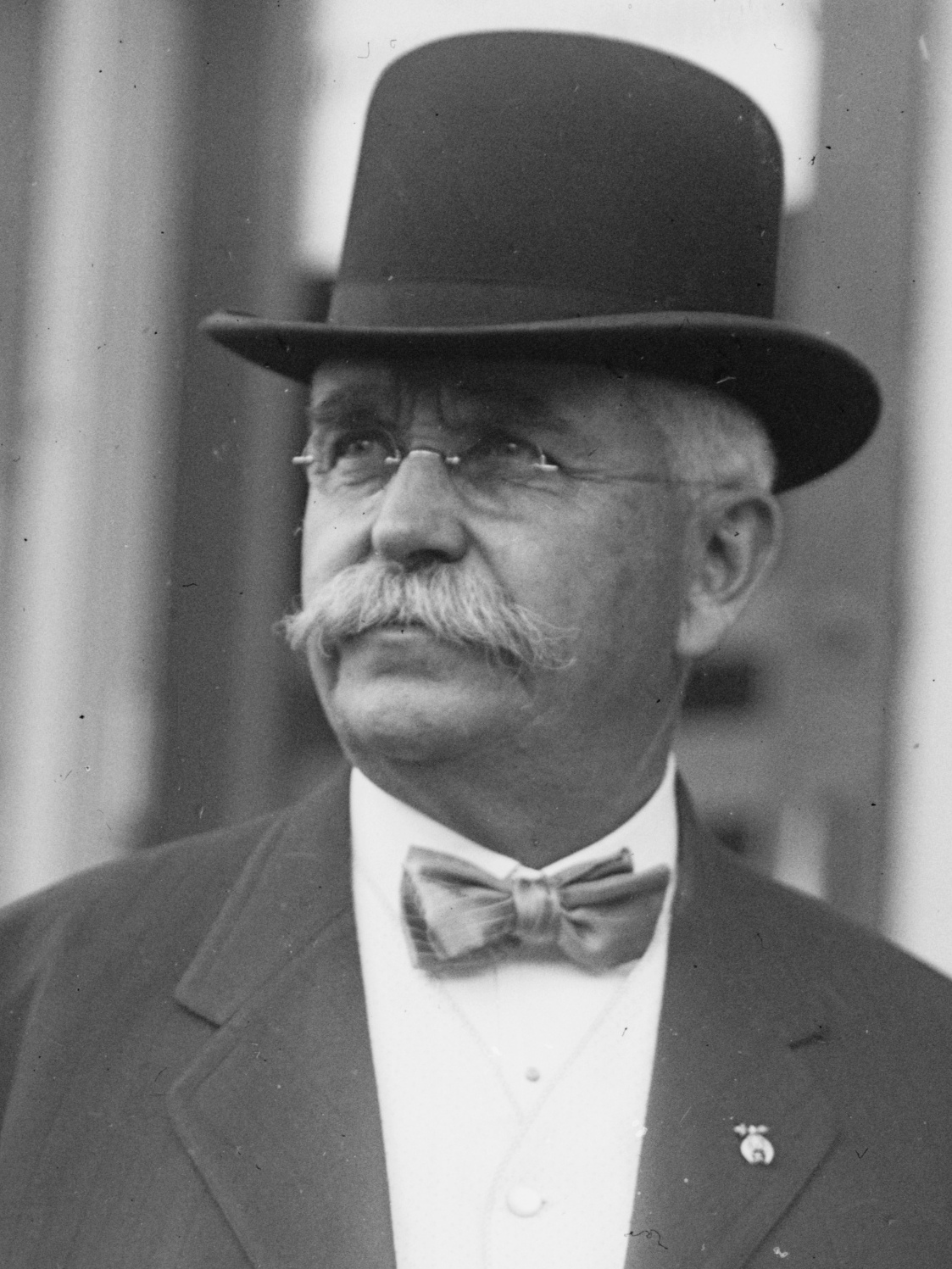

2nd Secretary of State of South Dakota
- In office November 8, 1892 – November 2, 1896
- Governor: Arthur C. Mellette; Charles H. Sheldon
- Preceded by: Amund O. Ringsrud
- Succeeded by: William H. Roddle

Mayor of Canton
- In office Two Terms

Lyon County Auditor
- In office 1874–1875

Personal details
- Born: November 14, 1848 Stavanger, Norway
- Died: August 30, 1915 (aged 66) Canton, South Dakota, U.S.
- Party: Republican

Thomas Thorson (November 14, 1848 – August 30, 1915) was an American politician and businessman who was the South Dakota Secretary of State from 1892 to 1896.

== Early life ==
Thorson was born on November 14, 1848, in Stavanger, Norway, to Norwegian parents. In 1854, he and his parents immigrated to United States when he was six years old. His parents and him resided in northeastern Iowa when they arrived in America. He helped with his home farm until 1869.

== Career ==
In 1869, Thorson was hired a clerk at a hardware establishment. He moved to Beloit, Iowa in 1871 and opened the town's first store, which was a successful general-merchandise business. In 1874, he was elected Lyon County Auditor. After his term expired as Lyon County Auditor, he became a trading representative of the Sioux City Journal.

In 1881, Thorson moved to Canton, South Dakota, where he made a career in real estate business. Later, he served two terms as mayor. In 1892, he was elected Secretary of State of South Dakota.

== Personal life ==
On July 12, 1882, he married Jessie Hunt. They had an unnamed baby that died soon after birth.
