= Duncan Church =

Historic church in South Dakota, United States

- U.S. National Register of Historic Places
- Location within South Dakota Location within the United States
- Nearest city: Gann Valley, South Dakota
- Coordinates: 44°10′49.8″N 99°3′25.6″W
- Area: 2.4 acres (0.97 ha)
- Built: 1927
- NRHP reference No.: 99000207
- Added to NRHP: February 12, 1999

Duncan Church, also known as Saint Placidus Catholic Church, is a historic church near Gann Valley, South Dakota. It is located southwest of Crow Creek, about 2 miles (3.2 km) south of the county line. It is about 13 miles (21 km) north and west of Gann Valley. It was built in 1927 and was added to the National Register in 1999.

It is a basilica plan church about 28 by 42 feet (8.5 m × 12.8 m) in size. It has clapboard siding and a gable roof.
