= Shantel Krebs =

American politician

Shantel Swedlund Krebs
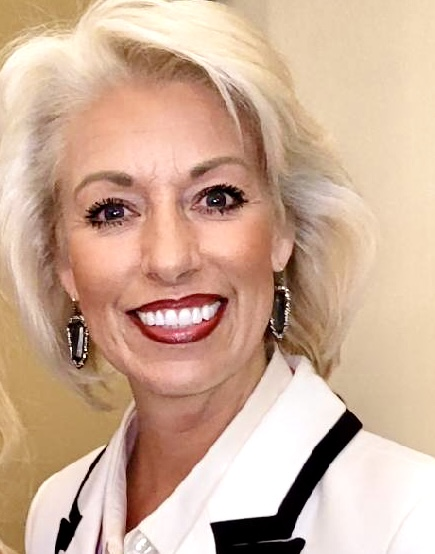

Secretary of State of South Dakota
- In office January 10, 2015 – January 5, 2019
- Governor: Dennis Daugaard
- Preceded by: Jason Gant
- Succeeded by: Steve Barnett

Member of the South Dakota Senate from the 10th district
- In office January 2011 – January 2015
- Preceded by: Gene G. Abdallah
- Succeeded by: Jenna Haggar

Member of the South Dakota House of Representatives from the 10th district
- In office January 2005 – January 2011
- Preceded by: Matt McCaulley; Ron Williamson
- Succeeded by: Gene G. Abdallah; Roger W. Hunt

Personal details
- Born: April 28, 1973 (age 53) De Smet, South Dakota, U.S.
- Party: Republican
- Spouse: Mitch Krebs
- Education: Dakota State University (BA)

Shantel Swedlund Krebs (born April 28, 1973) is an American businesswoman and former South Dakota Secretary of State. She previously served in the South Dakota House of Representatives and South Dakota Senate.

Shantel Krebs is currently CEO and regional president for Avera St. Mary's Hospital in Pierre, SD. Prior to this role, she was a founding partner with Avera Health and Southeast Technical Institute of the Avera Academy. She served as administrator for Avera Academy, a program that trains high school students for careers in healthcare. From 2019 to 2023, Krebs was also board chair and Chief Executive Officer of The Miss America Organization.

== Early life and education ==
Shantel Krebs was born in South Dakota and graduated from Arlington High School in Arlington, South Dakota, in 1991.

Krebs attended Dakota State University (DSU) in Madison, South Dakota, where she graduated with a bachelor's degree in business administration. Krebs was honored as a DSU distinguished alumnus and was the commencement speaker for DSU in December 2022.

== Political career ==
Krebs represented the 10th district of the South Dakota Legislature from 2005 to 2015, serving in the House of Representatives from 2005-2011 and in the Senate from 2011-2015. Krebs was elected to majority whip posts in both chambers and was chairwoman of the Transportation committee in the House and the Agriculture & Natural Resources committee in the Senate. She also served on the Senate Health and Human services committee. Her district included Lincoln County and Minnehaha County.

=== Secretary of state ===
Shantel was elected to the office of South Dakota Secretary of State in 2014, and sworn in on January 2, 2015.

Krebs ran unsuccessfully in the 2018 election for South Dakota's at-large congressional seat in the Republican primary.

== Personal life ==
Shantel Krebs, then known as Shantel Swedlund, won Miss South Dakota 1997 and competed in the Miss America 1998 competition. She resides in Canton, SD with her husband, former TV news anchor Mitch Krebs. In 2016, Krebs gained media attention when she shot a rattlesnake on her back patio of her home outside Fort Pierre.

On June 5, 2019, Krebs, a board member of the Miss America Organization, replaced former Miss America 1989 and former Fox News personality Gretchen Carlson as Chairperson of the Miss America Organization. Krebs was inducted into the South Dakota Hall of Fame on September 10, 2022.

== Electoral history ==
South Dakota House of Representatives 10th District Republican Primary Election, 2002
Party	Candidate	Votes	%
Republican	Matt McCaulley	3,092	40.02
Republican	Ron Williamson	2,586	30.85
Republican	Shantel Krebs	1,353	26.12

South Dakota House of Representatives 10th District Republican Primary Election, 2004
Party	Candidate	Votes	%
Republican	Roger Hunt	2,892	37.02
Republican	Shantel Krebs	2,566	32.85
Republican	Jarrod Johnson	2,353	30.12

South Dakota House of Representatives 10th District Election, 2004
Party	Candidate	Votes	%
Republican	Roger Hunt	8,375	53.44
Republican	Shantel Krebs	7,298	46.56

South Dakota House of Representatives 10th District Election, 2008
Party	Candidate	Votes	%
Republican	Shantel Krebs (inc.)	9,440	32.65
Republican	Roger Hunt (inc.)	7,975	27.58
Democratic	Robert Swanhorst	5,822	20.13
Democratic	MaryAnn Giebink	5,678	19.64

South Dakota Senate 10th District Election, 2010
Party	Candidate	Votes	%
Republican	Shantel Krebs	9,434	64.99
Democratic	George Gulson	5,083	35.01

South Dakota Senate 10th District Election, 2012
Party	Candidate	Votes	%
Republican	Shantel Krebs (inc.)	5,807	61.05
Democratic	Paul Thompson	3,705	38.95

South Dakota Secretary of State Election, 2014
Party	Candidate	Votes	%
Republican	Shantel Krebs	155,647	60.23
Democratic	Angelia Schultz	84,181	32.58
Constitution	Lori Stacey	10,258	3.97
Libertarian	Emmett Reistroffer	8,328	3.22

2018 Republican primary election – At Large Congressional District of South Dakota
Party	Candidate	Votes	%
Republican	Dusty Johnson	47,032	46.8
Republican	Shantel Krebs	29,442	29.2
Republican	Neal Tapio	23,980	24.0
Total votes		100,454	100

Party political offices
Preceded by Jason Gant	Republican nominee for Secretary of State of South Dakota; 2014	Succeeded by Steve Barnett
Awards and achievements
Preceded by Stephanie Camp	Miss South Dakota; 1997	Succeeded by Sarah Frankenstein
Political offices
Preceded by Jason Gant	Secretary of State of South Dakota; 2015–2019	Succeeded by Steve Barnett
