= Nancy Naeve =

American journalist

Nancy Naeve is an American former news co-anchor of KSFY News weekday mornings on KSFY-TV in Sioux Falls, South Dakota.

== Biography ==
Naeve was born and raised in Spencer, Iowa. She graduated from the University of South Dakota in 1990 with a B.A. in communication and a minor in Spanish.

In June 1992, Naeve joined the KSFY-TV news team. In 1999, she and Mitch Krebs became co-anchors of the 6:00pm and 10:00pm newscasts at KSFY-TV until Krebs's departure. Later, Naeve co-anchored with meteorologist Shawn Cable every weekday morning on KSFY News from 5:00-7:00 AM. She received the 2005 Tom Brokaw Award from the South Dakota Broadcasting Hall of Fame.

In May 2014, Naeve's comments went viral after she scolded viewers who called the station to complain about a tornado warning interrupting the season finale of the TV show Once Upon A Time.

Naeve retired from news anchoring in May 2015 and returned to her hometown of Spencer.
