= Jason Gant =

American politician

Secretary of State of South Dakota
- In office 2011–2015
- Governor: Dennis Daugaard
- Preceded by: Chris Nelson
- Succeeded by: Shantel Krebs

Member of the South Dakota Senate from the 11th district
- In office 2004–2011
- Preceded by: Mitch Richter
- Succeeded by: Todd Schlekeway

Personal details
- Born: December 18, 1976 (age 49) Platte, South Dakota, U.S.
- Party: Republican
- Spouse: Chris
- Children: Abbi, Sophie, Mallory
- Education: University of South Dakota (BS)
- Profession: businessman
- Website: www.JasonGant.com

Jason M. Gant (born December 18, 1976) is the former Secretary of State of South Dakota. A member of the Republican party, he had represented the 11th district in the South Dakota Senate since 2004

Gant graduated with a Bachelor of Science degree in 1999 from the University of South Dakota in political science and a minor in business administration. From 1999 to 2004, Gant was the Director of Dakota Care, a health insurance company. He then served as an executive for the South Dakota State Medical Association from 2004 to 2005, and in 2005 became the founder and owner of the Gant Group, Incorporated, a health care consulting business.

At the 2010 South Dakota Republican Party (GOP) Convention, Senator Gant won his party's nomination for Secretary of State, defeating two other GOP candidates. On November 2, 2010, he won his election bid to become the next Secretary of State of South Dakota.

In 2014, Gant activated the Innovative Overseas Absentee-balloting System (iOASIS) voting technology, which is currently available to Gant's overseas military constituents for all upcoming elections.

Party political offices
Preceded by Chris Nelson	Republican nominee for Secretary of State of South Dakota; 2010	Succeeded by Shantel Krebs
