= Heather Baxter =

American politician

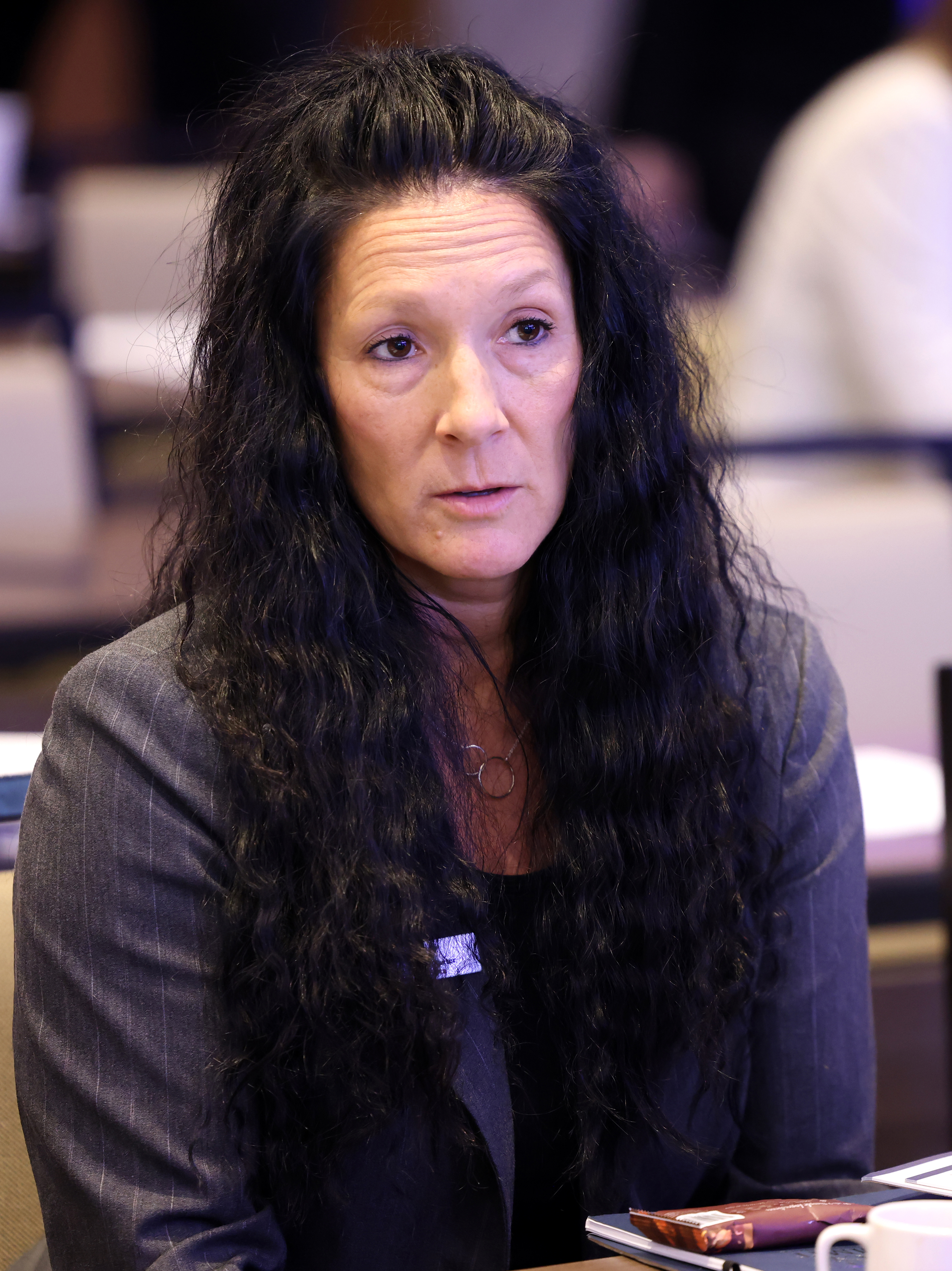

Member of the South Dakota House of Representatives from the 34th district
- Incumbent
- Assumed office January 14, 2025 Serving with Mike Derby
- Preceded by: Becky Drury

Personal details
- Born: September 25, 1975 (age 51)
- Party: Republican

Heather Baxter (born September 25, 1975) is an American politician who has served as a member of the South Dakota House of Representatives since 2025, representing the 34th district. She is a member of the Republican Party and a member of the South Dakota Freedom Caucus.

In October 2025, she announced her candidacy for South Dakota's 2026 Secretary of State election, running against incumbent Monae Johnson in the Republican primary. Baxter defeated Johnson at the state party convention on June 27.
