= Chris Nelson (American politician) =

American politician (born 1964)

Member of the South Dakota Public Utilities Commission
- Incumbent
- Assumed office January 8, 2011
- Appointed by: Dennis Daugaard
- Preceded by: Dusty Johnson

26th Secretary of State of South Dakota
- In office January 7, 2003 – January 8, 2011
- Governor: Mike Rounds
- Preceded by: Joyce Hazeltine
- Succeeded by: Jason Gant

Personal details
- Born: August 18, 1964 (age 61) Mitchell, South Dakota, U.S.
- Party: Republican
- Education: South Dakota State University (BS)

Chris Nelson (born August 18, 1964) is an American politician serving as a member of the South Dakota Public Utilities Commission. Nelson had previously served as Secretary of State of South Dakota from 2003 to 2011. A Republican, he was a candidate to become U.S. Representative from South Dakota's At-large congressional district in 2010, but lost to Kristi Noem in the Republican primary.

== Career ==
As secretary of state, Nelson received the 2010 Excellent Service to South Dakota County Officials award from the South Dakota County Officials Association; the 2004 Hazeltine/Taylor award from South Dakota Kids Voting; and the 2003 Excellence in South Dakota Municipal Government award from the South Dakota Municipal League. In 2005, he was appointed as a National Governors Association representative on the United States Election Assistance Commission Board of Advisors.

=== U.S. Senate consideration ===
Nelson was mentioned as a possible successor to Democratic U.S. Senator Tim Johnson, who suffered stroke-like bleeding in the brain caused by a congenital malformation known as arteriovenous malformation. Instead, former Governor Mike Rounds was elected.

Party political offices
| Preceded by Joyze Hazeltine | Republican nominee for Secretary of State of South Dakota; 2002, 2006 | Succeeded by Jason Gant |
Political offices
| Preceded by Joyce Hazeltine | Secretary of State of South Dakota; 2003–2011 | Succeeded by Jason Gant |
| Preceded by Dusty Johnson | Member of the South Dakota Public Utilities Commission; 2011–present | Incumbent |
