= Monae Johnson =

American politician

Secretary of State of South Dakota
- Incumbent
- Assumed office December 5, 2022
- Governor: Kristi Noem; Larry Rhoden
- Preceded by: Steve Barnett

Personal details
- Party: Republican
- Education: Black Hills State University (attended)

Monae L. Johnson is an American politician from South Dakota. A Republican, she is the South Dakota Secretary of State.

Johnson worked for the office of the South Dakota Secretary of State for eight years. She announced her candidacy for the 2022 election for secretary of state in February 2022. She challenged the incumbent, Steve Barnett, for the Republican nomination at the Republican convention on June 25, and won the nomination. During the campaign, Johnson refused to acknowledge that Joe Biden was the legitimate winner of the 2020 United States presidential election. She defeated Democrat Tom Cool in the November 8 general election. Barnett resigned from office in December, and Governor Kristi Noem appointed Johnson to the office effective December 5, and her own term began on January 2.

In January 2025, Johnson announced that she would run for a second term in the 2026 election. She lost the nomination to Heather Baxter at the state party's convention on June 27, 2026. On September 19, Johnson crossed party lines to endorse the Democratic candidate Terrence Davis.

Party political offices
Preceded by Steve Barnett	Republican nominee for Secretary of State of South Dakota; 2022	Succeeded by Heather Baxter
Political offices
Preceded by Steve Barnett	Secretary of State of South Dakota; 2022–present	Incumbent
