= Gary W. Hanson =

American politician

Gary Hanson

Member of the South Dakota Public Utilities Commission
- Incumbent
- Assumed office January 7, 2003
- Preceded by: Pam Nelson

Mayor of Sioux Falls
- In office 1994–2002
- Preceded by: Jack White
- Succeeded by: Dave Munson

Personal details
- Born: April 20, 1950 (age 76) Sioux Falls, South Dakota, U.S.
- Party: Republican
- Education: Northern State University (attended)

Gary W. Hanson is the current vice chairman of the South Dakota Public Utilities Commission. He previously served two terms as Mayor of Sioux Falls from 1995 to 2003, six years on the Sioux Falls City Council as utilities commissioner from 1989 to 1995, and three terms in the South Dakota Senate from the 13th district representing Minnehaha County from 1983 to 1988.

Political offices
| Preceded by Pam Nelson | Member of the South Dakota Public Utilities Commission; 2003–present | Incumbent |
