= Gann Valley, South Dakota =

Gann Valley
- Unincorporated community
- Location within the state of South Dakota Gann Valley (the United States)
- Coordinates: 44°02′01″N 98°59′18″W
- Country: United States
- State: South Dakota
- County: Buffalo
- Founded: 1885

Area
  - Total: 0.081 sq mi (0.21 km^{2})
  - Land: 0.081 sq mi (0.21 km^{2})
  - Water: 0 sq mi (0.00 km^{2})
- Elevation: 1,716 ft (523 m)

Population (2020)
  - Total: 10
  - Density: 126.1/sq mi (48.68/km^{2})
- Time zone: UTC-6 (Central (CST))
  - Summer (DST): UTC-5 (CDT)
- ZIP codes: 57341
- Area code: 605
- FIPS code: 46-23421
- GNIS feature ID: 2584554
- Website: https://www.gannvalley.com/

Gann Valley is a census-designated place in and the county seat of Buffalo County, South Dakota, United States. The town had a population of 10 as of the 2020 census. It is the smallest unincorporated county seat in the United States.

== History ==
The community was founded in 1885 by Herst Gann in a valley on Crow Creek just east of the Crow Creek Reservation. Gann donated the courthouse in the community and A.L. Spencer donated 30 acres, resulting in the community becoming the county seat. In 1886 the county seat was moved to Buffalo Center but was moved back to Gann in 1888.

The center of population of South Dakota is located in Gann Valley. Gann Valley holds the record for the highest temperature in South Dakota, at 120 °F (49 °C).

== Climate ==
This climatic region is typified by large seasonal temperature differences, with warm to hot (and often humid) summers and cold (sometimes severely cold) winters. According to the Köppen climate classification system, Gann Valley has a humid continental climate.

== Demographics ==
Historical population
Census	Pop.	Note	%±
2010	14		—
2020	10		−28.6%
2021 (est.)	12	▲	20.0%
U.S. Decennial Census

== See also ==
- List of census-designated places in South Dakota
