= Secretary of State of South Dakota =

Political office in South Dakota

- Incumbent; Monae Johnson
- Type: Secretary of State
- Website: Official homepage of the South Dakota Secretary of State

The secretary of state of South Dakota is an elected constitutional officer of the U.S. state of South Dakota. The current secretary of state is Monae Johnson.

== Divisions ==
The secretary of state's office is composed of three divisions:

- The Business Services Division registers corporations and other business entities, as well as trademarks, DBA statements and liens filed pursuant to the Uniform Commercial Code.
- The Elections Division administers elections and voter registration, and regulates campaign finance. The Secretary of State also serves as the chairperson of the South Dakota Board of Elections.
- The Administrative Services Division licenses notaries public, sports agents, and lobbyists, issues apostilles and concealed pistol permits, authorizes certain types of raffles, serves as registered agent for service of process for certain out-of-state citizens and corporations, and publishes the South Dakota Legislative Manual (referred to as the Blue Book).

== Other duties ==
The secretary serves on the State Board of Finance and maintains legislative records.

== Former officeholders ==
See table below.

#	Image	Name	Term of office	Party
1		Amund O. Ringsrud	October 1, 1889 – November 7, 1892	Republican
2		Thomas Thorson	November 8, 1892 – November 2, 1896	Republican
3		William H. Roddle	November 3, 1896 – 1901	Republican
4		Otto C. Berg	1901–1905	Republican
5		David D. Wipf	1905–1909	Republican
6		Samuel C. Polley	1909–1913	Republican
7		Frank P. Glasner	1913–1915	Republican
8		Frank M. Rood	1915—1919	Republican
9		Charles A. Burkhart	1919–1922	Republican
10		Clarence E. Coyne	1922–1927	Republican
11		Gladys Pyle	1927–1931	Republican
12		Elizabeth Coyne	1931–1933	Republican
13		Myrtle Morrison	1933–1937	Democratic
14		Goldie Wells	1937–1939	Democratic
15		Olive A. Ringsrud	1939–1943	Republican
16		Mrs. L. M. Larsen	1943–1947	Republican
17		Annamae Riff	1947–1951	Republican
18		Geraldine Ostroot	1951–1957	Republican
19		Clara Halls	1957–1959	Republican
20		Selma Sandness	1959–1961	Democratic
21		Essie Wiedenman	1961–1965	Republican
22		Alma Larson	1965–1973	Republican
23		Lorna Herseth	1973–1979	Democratic
24		Alice Kundert	1979–1986	Republican
25		Joyce Hazeltine	1986 – January 6, 2003	Republican
26		Chris Nelson	January 7, 2003 – January 6, 2011	Republican
27		Jason Gant	January 7, 2011 – January 9, 2015	Republican
28		Shantel Krebs	January 10, 2015 – January 5, 2019	Republican
29		Steve Barnett	January 6, 2019 – December 5, 2022	Republican
30		Monae Johnson	December 5, 2022 – present	Republican

== See also ==
- List of company registers
