= South Dakota Public Utilities Commission =

Agency overview
- Formed: 1885
- Jurisdiction: South Dakota
- Headquarters: Pierre, South Dakota
- Annual budget: $5,046,947 (FY 2025)
- Agency executives: Gary W. Hanson, Chairman; Chris Nelson, Vice Chairman
- Parent agency: State of South Dakota
- Website: http://puc.sd.gov/

The South Dakota Public Utilities Commission (PUC) is an elected, three-member entity that is responsible for regulating public utilities within the state, including electric, natural gas, telephone utilities, and grain storage warehouses. It was first formed in 1885 as the Dakota Territory Board of Railroad Commissioners. Upon South Dakota's admission to the Union as a state in 1889, the state legislature continued the Board as the Railroad Commission, and converted it to an elected office in 1893, with the first elections taking place in 1894. The legislature changed the name to the Public Utilities Commission in 1940. Since the Commission was established as an elected entity, Commissioners have been elected to staggered, six-year terms. In the event of a vacancy, the Governor makes an appointment to serve until a special election.

Republicans have held a majority on the Commission since 2003, following the defeat of Democratic Commissioner Pam Nelson in 2002. The last Democrat to be elected to the Commission was Steve Kolbeck, who was elected in 2006 and resigned in 2011.

== Commissioners ==
| Name | Party | Start | Next Election |
|---|---|---|---|
| Gary W. Hanson | Republican | January 7, 2003 | 2026 (retiring) |
| Chris Nelson | Republican | January 8, 2011 (appointed) | 2028 |
| Kristie Fiegen | Republican | August 9, 2011 (appointed) | 2030 |

== External sources ==
- South Dakota Public Utilities Commission
