= Buffalo County, South Dakota =

County in South Dakota, United States

- County
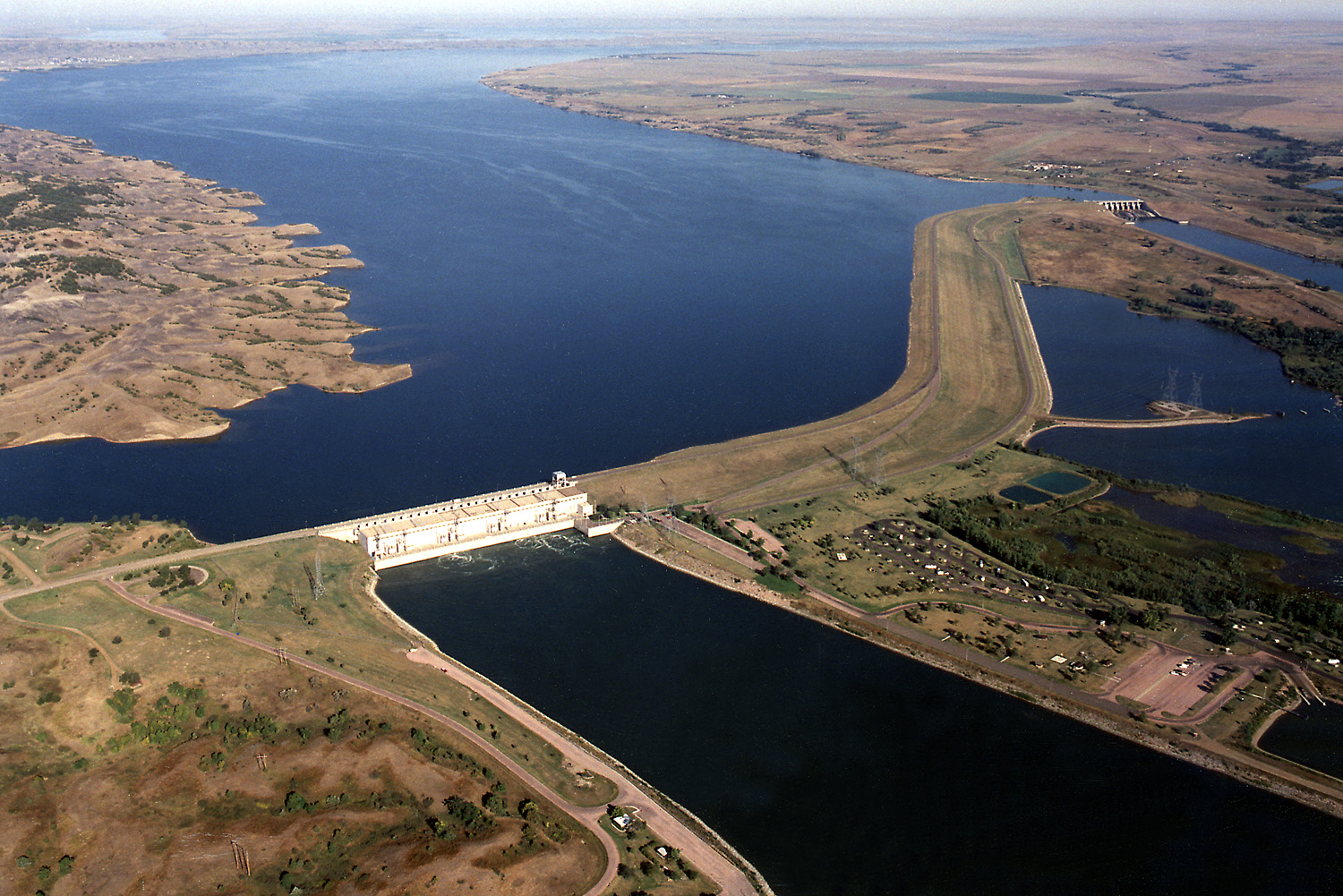
- Fort Thompson Big Bend Dam.

- Location within the U.S. state of South Dakota
- Coordinates: 44°02′39.502″N 99°12′14.392″W
- Country: United States
- State: South Dakota
- Created: 1864
- Organized: 1871
- Named for: American buffalo
- Seat: Gann Valley
- Largest community: Fort Thompson

Area
  - Total: 488 sq mi (1,260 km^{2})
  - Land: 471 sq mi (1,220 km^{2})
  - Water: 16 sq mi (41 km^{2}) 3.4%

Population (2020)
  - Total: 1,948
  - Estimate (2025): 1,802 ▼
  - Density: 4.14/sq mi (1.60/km^{2})
- Time zone: UTC−6 (Central)
  - Summer (DST): UTC−5 (CDT)
- Congressional district: At-large
- Website: buffalo.sdcounties.org

Buffalo County is a county in the U.S. state of South Dakota. As of the 2020 census, the population was 1,948. Its county seat is Gann Valley which, at 10 people, is the least populous county seat in the United States. The county was created in 1864, and was organized in 1871 as part of the Dakota Territory.

In 2010, the center of population of South Dakota was located in eastern Buffalo County. The Crow Creek Indian Reservation, inhabited by the Crow Creek Sioux Tribe, makes up the majority of Buffalo County.

According to the 2013 Small Area Income and Poverty Estimates of the U.S. Census Bureau, about 41% of county residents live in poverty, making it the fifth-poorest county in South Dakota. This is a far higher poverty rate than the national poverty rate of 15.8%. Median household income in 2013 was $21,572, making it the lowest-earning county in South Dakota and the United States.

In March 2019, the county unemployment rate was 3.9%; its ten-year peaks occurred in December 2006 (18.1%) and December 2009 (17.2%).

== Geography ==
The Missouri River flows southerly along the county's western boundary. The county terrain consists of semi-arid rolling hills, generally sloping to the south and east. Some area is devoted to agriculture. The south and west parts of the county are drained by Crow Creek, which discharges into the river at the county's SW corner. The county has a total area of 488 square miles (1,260 km^{2}), of which 471 square miles (1,220 km^{2}) is land and 16 square miles (41 km^{2}) (3.4%) is water.

=== Major highways ===
- South Dakota Highway 34
- South Dakota Highway 45
- South Dakota Highway 47
- South Dakota Highway 50

=== Adjacent counties ===
- Hand – northeast
- Jerauld – east
- Brule – south
- Lyman – west
- Hyde – northwest

=== Protected areas ===
- Pease State Game Production Area

=== Lakes ===
- Bedashosha Lake
- Lake Francis Case (part)
- Lake Sharpe (part)

== History ==
As first organized, the county occupied an extensive area, bounded on the north by Canada, southwest and west by the Missouri River, having Montana for a part of its northwest boundary, and comprising a large portion of the "Plateau du Coteau du Missouri", and a part of the Miniwakan or Devil's Lake. Thus, its original boundary also contained a portion of the future North Dakota, which became a separate unit when the Dakota Territory was admitted into the Union in 1889 as two separate states.

== Demographics ==
Historical population
Census	Pop.	Note	%±
1870	246		—
1880	63		−74.4%
1890	993		1,476.2%
1900	1,790		80.3%
1910	1,589		−11.2%
1920	1,715		7.9%
1930	1,931		12.6%
1940	1,853		−4.0%
1950	1,615		−12.8%
1960	1,547		−4.2%
1970	1,739		12.4%
1980	1,795		3.2%
1990	1,759		−2.0%
2000	2,032		15.5%
2010	1,912		−5.9%
2020	1,948		1.9%
2025 (est.)	1,802	▼	−7.5%
U.S. Decennial Census; 1790–1960 1900–1990; 1990–2000 2010–2020

=== 2020 census ===
As of the 2020 census, there were 1,948 people, 497 households, and 393 families residing in the county. The population density was 4.1 inhabitants per square mile (1.6/km^{2}). There were 570 housing units, of which 12.8% were vacant; 51.5% of occupied units were owner-occupied and 48.5% were renter-occupied, with a homeowner vacancy rate of 0.4% and a rental vacancy rate of 3.6%. Of the residents, 38.6% were under the age of 18 and 10.1% were 65 years of age or older; the median age was 25.8 years. For every 100 females there were 102.1 males, and for every 100 females age 18 and over there were 103.4 males. The racial makeup of the county was 14.7% White, 0.0% Black or African American, 81.4% American Indian and Alaska Native, 0.1% Asian, 0.0% from some other race, and 3.9% from two or more races. Hispanic or Latino residents of any race comprised 0.7% of the population. There were 497 households in the county, of which 58.1% had children under the age of 18 living with them, 35.2% had a female householder with no spouse or partner present, about 14.0% were made up of individuals, and 3.2% had someone living alone who was 65 years of age or older.

=== 2010 census ===
As of the 2010 census, there were 1,912 people, 532 households, and 407 families in the county. The population density was 4.1 inhabitants per square mile (1.6/km^{2}). There were 609 housing units at an average density of 1.3 per square mile (0.50/km^{2}). The racial makeup of the county was 84.0% Native American, 14.8% white, 0.2% black or African American, 0.1% Asian, 0.0% from other races, and 0.9% from two or more races. Those of Hispanic or Latino origin made up 1.8% of the population. In terms of ancestry, 5.6% were German, and 0.0% were American.

Of the 532 households, 55.6% had children under the age of 18 living with them, 33.1% were married couples living together, 33.1% had a female householder with no husband present, 23.5% were non-families, and 19.0% of all households were made up of individuals. The average household size was 3.59 and the average family size was 4.06. The median age was 25.0 years.

The median income for a household in the county was $27,926 and the median income for a family was $28,333. Males had a median income of $38,920 versus $18,542 for females. The per capita income for the county was $11,410. About 44.4% of families and 49.3% of the population were below the poverty line, including 58.2% of those under age 18 and 36.3% of those age 65 or over.

== Communities ==
=== Census-designated places ===
- Gann Valley (county seat)
- Fort Thompson

=== Unincorporated communities ===
- Crow Creek
- North Buffalo
- Shelby
- Southeast Buffalo

=== Township ===
- Elvira

== Politics ==
Democratic Party nominees have won Buffalo County in every presidential election since 1956 except the 1980 and 1984 elections, which Ronald Reagan won. However, many people in Buffalo County are also socially conservative, with this county being the only one in the state to both vote for Kamala Harris for president and vote against 2024 South Dakota Amendment G, which would have established a right to abortion in South Dakota's constitution.

United States presidential election results for Buffalo County, South Dakota
Year	Republican		Democratic		Third party(ies)	
Year	No.	%	No.	%	No.	%
1892	78	50.65%	13	8.44%	63	40.91%
1896	68	46.26%	79	53.74%	0	0.00%
1900	87	46.28%	100	53.19%	1	0.53%
1904	118	60.51%	43	22.05%	34	17.44%
1908	105	58.99%	69	38.76%	4	2.25%
1912	0	0.00%	105	53.85%	90	46.15%
1916	80	30.19%	182	68.68%	3	1.13%
1920	200	59.70%	101	30.15%	34	10.15%
1924	309	41.53%	225	30.24%	210	28.23%
1928	405	51.01%	387	48.74%	2	0.25%
1932	270	29.64%	634	69.59%	7	0.77%
1936	368	46.29%	410	51.57%	17	2.14%
1940	491	55.42%	395	44.58%	0	0.00%
1944	324	56.45%	250	43.55%	0	0.00%
1948	313	48.01%	334	51.23%	5	0.77%
1952	413	61.46%	259	38.54%	0	0.00%
1956	314	49.68%	318	50.32%	0	0.00%
1960	294	46.82%	334	53.18%	0	0.00%
1964	278	35.69%	501	64.31%	0	0.00%
1968	261	47.11%	265	47.83%	28	5.05%
1972	221	44.47%	275	55.33%	1	0.20%
1976	194	44.70%	240	55.30%	0	0.00%
1980	272	59.65%	147	32.24%	37	8.11%
1984	253	51.21%	236	47.77%	5	1.01%
1988	151	30.82%	334	68.16%	5	1.02%
1992	137	27.62%	282	56.85%	77	15.52%
1996	134	20.94%	465	72.66%	41	6.41%
2000	140	34.31%	256	62.75%	12	2.94%
2004	223	26.52%	603	71.70%	15	1.78%
2008	156	25.20%	454	73.34%	9	1.45%
2012	166	25.90%	472	73.63%	3	0.47%
2016	171	34.90%	296	60.41%	23	4.69%
2020	183	33.33%	352	64.12%	14	2.55%
2024	164	35.19%	291	62.45%	11	2.36%

== See also ==
- National Register of Historic Places listings in Buffalo County, South Dakota
