= Political party strength in South Dakota =

Politics in the US state of South Dakota

The following table indicates the party of elected officials in the U.S. state of South Dakota:

- Governor
- Lieutenant Governor
- Secretary of State
- Attorney General
- State Auditor
- State Treasurer
- Commissioner of School and Public Lands

The table also indicates the historical party composition in the:

- State Senate
- State House of Representatives
- State Public Utilities Commission
- State delegation to the U.S. Senate
- State delegation to the U.S. House of Representatives

For years in which a presidential election was held, the table indicates which party's candidate received the state's electoral votes.

Year	Executive offices							State Legislature		Pub. Util. Comm.	United States Congress			Electoral votes
Year	Governor	Lt. Governor	Sec. of State	Atty. Gen.	Auditor	Treasurer	Comm. of Lands	State Senate	State House	Pub. Util. Comm.	U.S. Senator (Class II)	U.S. Senator (Class III)	U.S. House	Electoral votes
1889	Arthur C. Mellette (R) (Note: Arthur C. Mellette had served as the final governor of Dakota Territory prior to his election as the first governor of the State of South Dakota.)	James H. Fletcher (R)	Amund O. Ringsrud (R)	Robert Dollard (R)	L. C. Taylor (R)	Wilbur F. Smith (R)	Osner H. Parker (R)	37R, 4D, 4I	106R, 13D, 2Pop, 2I, 1Fus	3NP	Richard F. Pettigrew (R)	Gideon C. Moody (R)	2R	
1890	Arthur C. Mellette (R)	James H. Fletcher (R)	Amund O. Ringsrud (R)	Robert Dollard (R)	L. C. Taylor (R)	Wilbur F. Smith (R)	Osner H. Parker (R)	37R, 4D, 4I	106R, 13D, 2Pop, 2I, 1Fus	3NP	Richard F. Pettigrew (R)	Gideon C. Moody (R)	2R	
1891	Arthur C. Mellette (R)	George H. Hoffman (R)	Amund O. Ringsrud (R)	Robert Dollard (R)	L. C. Taylor (R)	W. W. Taylor (R)	Thomas H. Ruth (R)	22R, 10I, 8D, 3Pop, 2?	58D, 33I, 20R, 10Pop, 1Fus (Note: An Independent Republican Speaker, Charles X. Seward, was elected with the support of Democrats, Independents, Populists, and members of the Farmers' Alliance who ran as independents. This alliance, with the Farmers' Alliance and the Populists being predominant, ran and organized the chamber.)	3NP	Richard F. Pettigrew (R)	James H. Kyle (I)	2R	
1892	Arthur C. Mellette (R)	George H. Hoffman (R)	Amund O. Ringsrud (R)	Robert Dollard (R)	L. C. Taylor (R)	W. W. Taylor (R)	Thomas H. Ruth (R)	22R, 10I, 8D, 3Pop, 2?	58D, 33I, 20R, 10Pop, 1Fus	3NP	Richard F. Pettigrew (R)	James H. Kyle (I)	2R	Harrison/ Reid (R) ✗
1893	Charles H. Sheldon (R)	Charles N. Herreid (R)	Thomas Thorson (R)	Coe I. Crawford (R)	J. E. Hipple (R)	W. W. Taylor (R)	Thomas H. Ruth (R)	35R, 4D, 3I, 1Pop	69R, 8I, 4D, 2Pop	3NP	Richard F. Pettigrew (R)	James H. Kyle (Pop)	2R	Harrison/ Reid (R) ✗
1894	Charles H. Sheldon (R)	Charles N. Herreid (R)	Thomas Thorson (R)	Coe I. Crawford (R)	J. E. Hipple (R)	W. W. Taylor (R)	Thomas H. Ruth (R)	35R, 4D, 3I, 1Pop	69R, 8I, 4D, 2Pop	3NP	Richard F. Pettigrew (R)	James H. Kyle (Pop)	2R	Harrison/ Reid (R) ✗
1895	Charles H. Sheldon (R)	Charles N. Herreid (R)	Thomas Thorson (R)	Coe I. Crawford (R)	J. E. Hipple (R)	Kirk G. Phillips (R)	John L. Lockhart (R)	35R, 3D, 3Pop, 3Fus, 1I	69R, 11Pop, 2D, 2I	3R	Richard F. Pettigrew (R)	James H. Kyle (Pop)	2R	Harrison/ Reid (R) ✗
1896	Charles H. Sheldon (R)	Charles N. Herreid (R)	Thomas Thorson (R)	Coe I. Crawford (R)	J. E. Hipple (R)	Kirk G. Phillips (R)	John L. Lockhart (R)	35R, 3D, 3Pop, 3Fus, 1I	69R, 11Pop, 2D, 2I	3R	Richard F. Pettigrew (SvR)	James H. Kyle (Pop)	2R	2 – Bryan/ Sewall (D/SvR) ✗ 2 – Bryan/ Watson (Pop) ✗
1897	Andrew E. Lee (Pop)	Daniel T. Hindman (R)	William H. Roddle (R)	Melvin Grigsby (Pop)	J. E. Mayhew (R)	Kirk G. Phillips (R)	John L. Lockhart (R)	20R, 15Fus, 6Pop, 2D	39R, 18Fus, 17Pop, 9D, 1I	3Pop	Richard F. Pettigrew (SvR)	James H. Kyle (Pop)	2Pop	2 – Bryan/ Sewall (D/SvR) ✗ 2 – Bryan/ Watson (Pop) ✗
1898	Andrew E. Lee (Pop)	Daniel T. Hindman (R)	William H. Roddle (R)	Melvin Grigsby (Pop)	J. E. Mayhew (R)	Kirk G. Phillips (R)	John L. Lockhart (R)	20R, 15Fus, 6Pop, 2D	39R, 18Fus, 17Pop, 9D, 1I	3Pop	Richard F. Pettigrew (SvR)	James H. Kyle (Pop)	2Pop	2 – Bryan/ Sewall (D/SvR) ✗ 2 – Bryan/ Watson (Pop) ✗
1899	Andrew E. Lee (Fus) (Note: Andrew E. Lee won re-election on the Fusion ticket in 1898. In 1898, the Fusion Party was a coalition of Democrats/ Populists; in 1900 it consisted of Democrats, Populists and Silver Republicans.)	John T. Kean (R)	William H. Roddle (R)	John L. Pyle (R) (Note: Died in office.)	James D. Reeves (R)	John Schamber (R)	David Eastman (R)	31R, 6Fus, 4D, 4Pop	61R, 15Fus, 9D, 2Pop	2Pop, 1R	Richard F. Pettigrew (SvR)	James H. Kyle (Pop)	2R	2 – Bryan/ Sewall (D/SvR) ✗ 2 – Bryan/ Watson (Pop) ✗
1900	Andrew E. Lee (Fus)	John T. Kean (R)	William H. Roddle (R)	John L. Pyle (R)	James D. Reeves (R)	John Schamber (R)	David Eastman (R)	31R, 6Fus, 4D, 4Pop	61R, 15Fus, 9D, 2Pop	2Pop, 1R	Richard F. Pettigrew (SvR)	James H. Kyle (Pop)	2R	McKinley/ Roosevelt (R) ✓
1901	Andrew E. Lee (Fus)	John T. Kean (R)	William H. Roddle (R)	John L. Pyle (R)	James D. Reeves (R)	John Schamber (R)	David Eastman (R)	31R, 6Fus, 4D, 4Pop	61R, 15Fus, 9D, 2Pop	2Pop, 1R	Richard F. Pettigrew (SvR)	James H. Kyle (R)	2R	McKinley/ Roosevelt (R) ✓
1901	Charles N. Herreid (R)	George W. Snow (R)	O. C. Berg (R)	John L. Pyle (R)	James D. Reeves (R)	John Schamber (R)	David Eastman (R)	41R, 2Fus, 1D, 1Pop	79R, 7D, 1Fus	2R, 1Pop	Robert J. Gamble (R)	Alfred B. Kittredge (R)	2R	McKinley/ Roosevelt (R) ✓
1902	Charles N. Herreid (R)	George W. Snow (R)	O. C. Berg (R)	Adolphus W. Burtt (R)	James D. Reeves (R)	John Schamber (R)	David Eastman (R)	41R, 2Fus, 1D, 1Pop	79R, 7D, 1Fus	2R, 1Pop	Robert J. Gamble (R)	Alfred B. Kittredge (R)	2R	McKinley/ Roosevelt (R) ✓
1903	Charles N. Herreid (R)	George W. Snow (R)	O. C. Berg (R)	Philo Hall (R)	J. F. Halladay (R)	C. B. Collins (R)	C. J. Bach (R)	41R, 3D, 1Fus	77R, 8D, 2Fus	3R	Robert J. Gamble (R)	Alfred B. Kittredge (R)	2R	McKinley/ Roosevelt (R) ✓
1904	Charles N. Herreid (R)	George W. Snow (R)	O. C. Berg (R)	Philo Hall (R)	J. F. Halladay (R)	C. B. Collins (R)	C. J. Bach (R)	41R, 3D, 1Fus	77R, 8D, 2Fus	3R	Robert J. Gamble (R)	Alfred B. Kittredge (R)	2R	Roosevelt/ Fairbanks (R) ✓
1905	Samuel H. Elrod (R)	John E. McDougall (R)	David D. Wipf (R)	Philo Hall (R)	J. F. Halladay (R)	C. B. Collins (R)	C. J. Bach (R)	42R, 2Pop, 1D	86R, 2D, 1Fus	3R	Robert J. Gamble (R)	Alfred B. Kittredge (R)	2R	Roosevelt/ Fairbanks (R) ✓
1906	Samuel H. Elrod (R)	John E. McDougall (R)	David D. Wipf (R)	Philo Hall (R)	J. F. Halladay (R)	C. B. Collins (R)	C. J. Bach (R)	42R, 2Pop, 1D	86R, 2D, 1Fus	3R	Robert J. Gamble (R)	Alfred B. Kittredge (R)	2R	Roosevelt/ Fairbanks (R) ✓
1907	Coe I. Crawford (R)	Howard C. Shober (R)	David D. Wipf (R)	S. Wesley Clark (R)	John Hirning (R)	C. H. Cassill (R)	O. C. Dokken (R)	35R, 8D, 1Pop, 1Fus	80R, 9D	3R	Robert J. Gamble (R)	Alfred B. Kittredge (R)	2R	Roosevelt/ Fairbanks (R) ✓
1908	Coe I. Crawford (R)	Howard C. Shober (R)	David D. Wipf (R)	S. Wesley Clark (R)	John Hirning (R)	C. H. Cassill (R)	O. C. Dokken (R)	35R, 8D, 1Pop, 1Fus	80R, 9D	3R	Robert J. Gamble (R)	Alfred B. Kittredge (R)	2R	Taft/ Sherman (R) ✓
1909	Robert S. Vessey (R)	Howard C. Shober (R)	Samuel C. Polley (R)	S. Wesley Clark (R)	John Hirning (R)	George G. Johnson (R)	O. C. Dokken (R)	38R, 6D, 1Pop	92R, 9D, 1Pop, 1I	3R	Robert J. Gamble (R)	Coe I. Crawford (R)	2R	Taft/ Sherman (R) ✓
1910	Robert S. Vessey (R)	Howard C. Shober (R)	Samuel C. Polley (R)	S. Wesley Clark (R)	John Hirning (R)	George G. Johnson (R)	O. C. Dokken (R)	38R, 6D, 1Pop	92R, 9D, 1Pop, 1I	3R	Robert J. Gamble (R)	Coe I. Crawford (R)	2R	Taft/ Sherman (R) ✓
1911	Robert S. Vessey (R)	Frank M. Byrne (R)	Samuel C. Polley (R)	Royal C. Johnson (R)	Henry B. Anderson (R)	George G. Johnson (R)	F. F. Brinkler (R)	32R, 11D, 1Pop, 1I	97R, 5D, 1Pop, 1I	3R	Robert J. Gamble (R)	Coe I. Crawford (R)	2R	Taft/ Sherman (R) ✓
1912	Robert S. Vessey (R)	Frank M. Byrne (R)	Samuel C. Polley (R)	Royal C. Johnson (R)	Henry B. Anderson (R)	George G. Johnson (R)	F. F. Brinkler (R)	32R, 11D, 1Pop, 1I	97R, 5D, 1Pop, 1I	3R	Robert J. Gamble (R)	Coe I. Crawford (R)	2R	Roosevelt/ Johnson (Prog) ✗
1913	Frank M. Byrne (R)	Edward Lincoln Abel (R)	Frank Galsner(R)	Royal C. Johnson (R)	Henry B. Anderson (R)	A. W. Ewert (R)	F. F. Brinkler (R)	34R, 11D	89R, 13D, 1I	3R	Thomas Sterling (R)	Coe I. Crawford (R)	3R	Roosevelt/ Johnson (Prog) ✗
1914	Frank M. Byrne (R)	Edward Lincoln Abel (R)	Frank Galsner(R)	Royal C. Johnson (R)	Henry B. Anderson (R)	A. W. Ewert (R)	F. F. Brinkler (R)	34R, 11D	89R, 13D, 1I	3R	Thomas Sterling (R)	Coe I. Crawford (R)	3R	Roosevelt/ Johnson (Prog) ✗
1915	Frank M. Byrne (R)	Peter Norbeck (R)	Frank M. Rood (R)	Clarence C. Caldwell (R)	J. E. Handlin (R)	A. W. Ewert (R)	Fred Hepperle (R)	34R, 11D	84R, 19D	3R	Thomas Sterling (R)	Edwin S. Johnson (D)	2R, 1D	Roosevelt/ Johnson (Prog) ✗
1916	Frank M. Byrne (R)	Peter Norbeck (R)	Frank M. Rood (R)	Clarence C. Caldwell (R)	J. E. Handlin (R)	A. W. Ewert (R)	Fred Hepperle (R)	34R, 11D	84R, 19D	3R	Thomas Sterling (R)	Edwin S. Johnson (D)	2R, 1D	Hughes/ Fairbanks (R) ✗
1917	Peter Norbeck (R)	William H. McMaster (R)	Frank M. Rood (R)	Clarence C. Caldwell (R)	J. E. Handlin (R)	G. H. Helgerson (R)	N. E. Knight (R)	35R, 10D	89R, 14D	3R	Thomas Sterling (R)	Edwin S. Johnson (D)	2R, 1D	Hughes/ Fairbanks (R) ✗
1918	Peter Norbeck (R)	William H. McMaster (R)	Frank M. Rood (R)	Clarence C. Caldwell (R)	J. E. Handlin (R)	G. H. Helgerson (R)	N. E. Knight (R)	35R, 10D	89R, 14D	3R	Thomas Sterling (R)	Edwin S. Johnson (D)	2R, 1D	Hughes/ Fairbanks (R) ✗
1919	Peter Norbeck (R)	William H. McMaster (R)	C. A. Burkhart (R)	Byron S. Payne (R)	Jay Reeves (R)	G. H. Helgerson (R)	N. E. Knight (R)	43R, 2D	88R, 11D, 3I, 1?	3R	Thomas Sterling (R)	Edwin S. Johnson (D)	2R, 1D	Hughes/ Fairbanks (R) ✗
1920	Peter Norbeck (R)	William H. McMaster (R)	C. A. Burkhart (R)	Byron S. Payne (R)	Jay Reeves (R)	G. H. Helgerson (R)	N. E. Knight (R)	43R, 2D	88R, 11D, 3I, 1?	3R	Thomas Sterling (R)	Edwin S. Johnson (D)	2R, 1D	Harding/ Coolidge (R) ✓
1921	William H. McMaster (R)	Carl Gunderson (R)	C. A. Burkhart (R)	Byron S. Payne (R)	Jay Reeves (R)	W. S. O'Brein (R)	N. E. Knight (R)	44R, 1D	95R, 4D, 4I	3R	Thomas Sterling (R)	Peter Norbeck (R)	3R	Harding/ Coolidge (R) ✓
1922	William H. McMaster (R)	Carl Gunderson (R)	Clarence E. Coyne (R)	Byron S. Payne (R)	Jay Reeves (R)	W. S. O'Brein (R)	N. E. Knight (R)	44R, 1D	95R, 4D, 4I	3R	Thomas Sterling (R)	Peter Norbeck (R)	3R	Harding/ Coolidge (R) ✓
1923	William H. McMaster (R)	Carl Gunderson (R)	Clarence E. Coyne (R)	Buell F. Jones (R)	Edward A. Jones (R)	W. S. O'Brein (R)	N. E. Knight (R)	34R, 9D, 2I	84R, 12D, 5I, 1Fus	3R	Thomas Sterling (R)	Peter Norbeck (R)	3R	Harding/ Coolidge (R) ✓
1924	William H. McMaster (R)	Carl Gunderson (R)	Clarence E. Coyne (R)	Buell F. Jones (R)	Edward A. Jones (R)	W. S. O'Brein (R)	N. E. Knight (R)	34R, 9D, 2I	84R, 12D, 5I, 1Fus	3R	Thomas Sterling (R)	Peter Norbeck (R)	3R	Coolidge/ Dawes (R) ✓
1925	Carl Gunderson (R)	Alva Clark Forney (R)	Clarence E. Coyne (R)	Buell F. Jones (R)	Edward A. Jones (R)	James L. Driscoll (R)	O. P. J. Englstorm (R)	35R, 9D, 1FL	85R, 15D, 2I, 1Fus	3R	William H. McMaster (R)	Peter Norbeck (R)	3R	Coolidge/ Dawes (R) ✓
1926	Carl Gunderson (R)	Alva Clark Forney (R)	Clarence E. Coyne (R)	Buell F. Jones (R)	Edward A. Jones (R)	James L. Driscoll (R)	O. P. J. Englstorm (R)	35R, 9D, 1FL	85R, 15D, 2I, 1Fus	3R	William H. McMaster (R)	Peter Norbeck (R)	3R	Coolidge/ Dawes (R) ✓
1927	William J. Bulow (D)	Hyatt E. Covey (R)	Gladys Pyle (R)	Buell F. Jones (R)	Edward A. Jones (R)	A. J. Moodie (R)	O. P. J. Englstorm (R)	29R, 16D	77R, 25D, 1?	3R	William H. McMaster (R)	Peter Norbeck (R)	3R	Coolidge/ Dawes (R) ✓
1928	William J. Bulow (D)	Hyatt E. Covey (R)	Gladys Pyle (R)	Buell F. Jones (R)	Edward A. Jones (R)	A. J. Moodie (R)	O. P. J. Englstorm (R)	29R, 16D	77R, 25D, 1?	3R	William H. McMaster (R)	Peter Norbeck (R)	3R	Hoover/ Curtis (R) ✓
1929	William J. Bulow (D)	Clarence E. Coyne (R)	Gladys Pyle (R)	Merrell Q. Sharpe (R)	William M. Dunn (R)	A. J. Moodie (R)	O. P. J. Englstorm (R)	33R, 12D	82R, 21D	3R	William H. McMaster (R)	Peter Norbeck (R)	3R	Hoover/ Curtis (R) ✓
1929	William J. Bulow (D)	John T. Grigsby (D) (Note: Appointed to fill a vacancy.)	Gladys Pyle (R)	Merrell Q. Sharpe (R)	William M. Dunn (R)	A. J. Moodie (R)	O. P. J. Englstorm (R)	33R, 12D	82R, 21D	3R	William H. McMaster (R)	Peter Norbeck (R)	3R	Hoover/ Curtis (R) ✓
1930	William J. Bulow (D)	John T. Grigsby (D)	Gladys Pyle (R)	Merrell Q. Sharpe (R)	William M. Dunn (R)	A. J. Moodie (R)	O. P. J. Englstorm (R)	33R, 12D	82R, 21D	3R	William H. McMaster (R)	Peter Norbeck (R)	3R	Hoover/ Curtis (R) ✓
1931	Warren Green (R)	Odell K. Whitney (R)	Elizabeth Coyne (R)	Merrell Q. Sharpe (R)	William M. Dunn (R)	A. C. Goodhope (R)	O. P. J. Englstorm (R)	31R, 14D	79R, 24D	3R	William J. Bulow (D)	Peter Norbeck (R)	3R	Hoover/ Curtis (R) ✓
1932	Warren Green (R)	Odell K. Whitney (R)	Elizabeth Coyne (R)	Merrell Q. Sharpe (R)	William M. Dunn (R)	A. C. Goodhope (R)	O. P. J. Englstorm (R)	31R, 14D	79R, 24D	3R	William J. Bulow (D)	Peter Norbeck (R)	3R	Roosevelt/ Garner (D) ✓
1933	Tom Berry (D)	Hans Ustrud (D)	Myrtle Morrison (D)	D. Walter Conway (D)	George O'Neill (D)	Frank G. Stewart (D)	Ben Strool (D)	30D, 15R	69D, 34R	2R, 1D	William J. Bulow (D)	Peter Norbeck (R)	2D	Roosevelt/ Garner (D) ✓
1934	Tom Berry (D)	Hans Ustrud (D)	Myrtle Morrison (D)	D. Walter Conway (D)	George O'Neill (D)	Frank G. Stewart (D)	Ben Strool (D)	30D, 15R	69D, 34R	2R, 1D	William J. Bulow (D)	Peter Norbeck (R)	2D	Roosevelt/ Garner (D) ✓
1935	Tom Berry (D)	Robert Peterson (D)	Myrtle Morrison (D)	D. Walter Conway (D)	George O'Neill (D)	Frank G. Stewart (D)	Ben Strool (D)	32D, 13R	63D, 40R	2D, 1R	William J. Bulow (D)	Peter Norbeck (R)	2D	Roosevelt/ Garner (D) ✓
1936	Tom Berry (D)	Robert Peterson (D)	Myrtle Morrison (D)	D. Walter Conway (D)	George O'Neill (D)	Frank G. Stewart (D)	Ben Strool (D)	32D, 13R	63D, 40R	2D, 1R	William J. Bulow (D)	Peter Norbeck (R)	2D	Roosevelt/ Garner (D) ✓
1937	Leslie Jensen (R)	Donald McMurchie (R)	Goldie Wells (D)	Clair Roddewig (D)	Raymond A. Kelly (D)	W. H. Hinselman (D)	Ben Strool (D)	23R, 22D	66R, 37D	2R, 1D	William J. Bulow (D)	Herbert E. Hitchcock (D)	1D, 1R	Roosevelt/ Garner (D) ✓
1938	Leslie Jensen (R)	Donald McMurchie (R)	Goldie Wells (D)	Clair Roddewig (D)	Raymond A. Kelly (D)	W. H. Hinselman (D)	Ben Strool (D)	23R, 22D	66R, 37D	2R, 1D	William J. Bulow (D)	Gladys Pyle (R)	1D, 1R	Roosevelt/ Garner (D) ✓
1939	Harlan J. Bushfield (R)	Donald McMurchie (R)	Olive A. Ringsrud (R)	Leo A. Temmey (R)	W. W. Warner (R)	W. G. Douglas (R)	Earl A. Hammerquest (R)	30R, 5D	62R, 13D	3R	William J. Bulow (D)	Chan Gurney (R)	2R	Roosevelt/ Garner (D) ✓
1940	Harlan J. Bushfield (R)	Donald McMurchie (R)	Olive A. Ringsrud (R)	Leo A. Temmey (R)	W. W. Warner (R)	W. G. Douglas (R)	Earl A. Hammerquest (R)	30R, 5D	62R, 13D	3R	William J. Bulow (D)	Chan Gurney (R)	2R	Willkie/ McNary (R) ✗
1941	Harlan J. Bushfield (R)	A. C. Miller (R)	Olive A. Ringsrud (R)	Leo A. Temmey (R)	W. W. Warner (R)	W. G. Douglas (R)	Earl A. Hammerquest (R)	31R, 4D	65R, 10D	3R	William J. Bulow (D)	Chan Gurney (R)	2R	Willkie/ McNary (R) ✗
1942	Harlan J. Bushfield (R)	A. C. Miller (R)	Olive A. Ringsrud (R)	Leo A. Temmey (R)	W. W. Warner (R)	John N. Thompson (R)	Earl A. Hammerquest (R)	31R, 4D	65R, 10D	3R	William J. Bulow (D)	Chan Gurney (R)	2R	Willkie/ McNary (R) ✗
1943	Merrell Q. Sharpe (R)	A. C. Miller (R)	L. M. Larsen (R)	George T. Mickelson (R)	W. W. Warner (R)	E. V. Youngquist (R)	John A. Lunden (R)	31R, 4D	69R, 6D	3R	Harlan J. Bushfield (R)	Chan Gurney (R)	2R	Willkie/ McNary (R) ✗
1944	Merrell Q. Sharpe (R)	A. C. Miller (R)	L. M. Larsen (R)	George T. Mickelson (R)	W. W. Warner (R)	E. V. Youngquist (R)	John A. Lunden (R)	31R, 4D	69R, 6D	3R	Harlan J. Bushfield (R)	Chan Gurney (R)	2R	Dewey/ Bricker (R) ✗
1945	Merrell Q. Sharpe (R)	Sioux K. Grigsby (R)	L. M. Larsen (R)	George T. Mickelson (R)	Steve E. Anderson (R)	Hazel Dean (R)	John A. Lunden (R)	35R	72R, 3D	3R	Harlan J. Bushfield (R)	Chan Gurney (R)	2R	Dewey/ Bricker (R) ✗
1946	Merrell Q. Sharpe (R)	Sioux K. Grigsby (R)	L. M. Larsen (R)	George T. Mickelson (R)	Steve E. Anderson (R)	Hazel Dean (R)	John A. Lunden (R)	35R	72R, 3D	3R	Harlan J. Bushfield (R)	Chan Gurney (R)	2R	Dewey/ Bricker (R) ✗
1947	George T. Mickelson (R)	Sioux K. Grigsby (R)	Annamae Riff (R)	Sigurd Anderson (R)	Steve E. Anderson (R)	Clarence E. Buehler (R)	John A. Lunden (R)	35R	71R, 4D	3R	Harlan J. Bushfield (R)	Chan Gurney (R)	2R	Dewey/ Bricker (R) ✗
1948	George T. Mickelson (R)	Sioux K. Grigsby (R)	Annamae Riff (R)	Sigurd Anderson (R)	Steve E. Anderson (R)	Clarence E. Buehler (R)	John A. Lunden (R)	35R	71R, 4D	3R	Harlan J. Bushfield (R)	Chan Gurney (R)	2R	Dewey/ Warren (R) ✗
1948	George T. Mickelson (R)	Sioux K. Grigsby (R)	Annamae Riff (R)	Sigurd Anderson (R)	Steve E. Anderson (R)	Clarence E. Buehler (R)	John A. Lunden (R)	35R	71R, 4D	3R	Vera C. Bushfield (R)	Chan Gurney (R)	2R	Dewey/ Warren (R) ✗
1949	George T. Mickelson (R)	Rex Terry (R)	Annamae Riff (R)	Sigurd Anderson (R)	Steve E. Anderson (R)	Clarence E. Buehler (R)	Bernard Linn (R)	27R, 8D	64R, 11D	3R	Karl Mundt (R) (Note: Appointed after having already been elected to a full term.)	Chan Gurney (R)	2R	Dewey/ Warren (R) ✗
1950	George T. Mickelson (R)	Rex Terry (R)	Annamae Riff (R)	Sigurd Anderson (R)	James O. Gilkerson (R)	Clarence E. Buehler (R)	Bernard Linn (R)	27R, 8D	64R, 11D	3R	Karl Mundt (R)	Chan Gurney (R)	2R	Dewey/ Warren (R) ✗
1951	Sigurd Anderson (R)	Rex Terry (R)	Geraldine Ostroot (R)	Ralph A. Dunham (R)	James O. Gilkerson (R)	Theodore Mehlaf (R)	Bernard Linn (R)	29R, 6D	66R, 9D	3R	Karl Mundt (R)	Francis Case (R)	2R	Dewey/ Warren (R) ✗
1952	Sigurd Anderson (R)	Rex Terry (R)	Geraldine Ostroot (R)	Ralph A. Dunham (R)	Lawrence E. Mayes (R)	Theodore Mehlaf (R)	Bernard Linn (R)	29R, 6D	66R, 9D	3R	Karl Mundt (R)	Francis Case (R)	2R	Eisenhower/ Nixon (R) ✓
1953	Sigurd Anderson (R)	Rex Terry (R)	Geraldine Ostroot (R)	Ralph A. Dunham (R)	Lawrence E. Mayes (R)	Theodore Mehlaf (R)	Bernard Linn (R)	35R	73R, 2D	3R	Karl Mundt (R)	Francis Case (R)	2R	Eisenhower/ Nixon (R) ✓
1954	Sigurd Anderson (R)	Rex Terry (R)	Geraldine Ostroot (R)	Ralph A. Dunham (R)	Lawrence E. Mayes (R)	Theodore Mehlaf (R)	Bernard Linn (R)	35R	73R, 2D	3R	Karl Mundt (R)	Francis Case (R)	2R	Eisenhower/ Nixon (R) ✓
1955	Joe Foss (R)	L. Roy Houck (R)	Geraldine Ostroot (R)	Phil Saunders (R)	Lawrence E. Mayes (R)	Ed Elkins (R)	Bernard Linn (R)	29R, 6D	57R, 18D	3R	Karl Mundt (R)	Francis Case (R)	2R	Eisenhower/ Nixon (R) ✓
1956	Joe Foss (R)	L. Roy Houck (R)	Geraldine Ostroot (R)	Phil Saunders (R)	Fay A. Allbee (R)	Ed Elkins (R)	Bernard Linn (R)	29R, 6D	57R, 18D	3R	Karl Mundt (R)	Francis Case (R)	2R	Eisenhower/ Nixon (R) ✓
1957	Joe Foss (R)	L. Roy Houck (R)	Clara Halls (R)	Phil Saunders (R)	Fay A. Allbee (R)	Ed Elkins (R)	Bernard Linn (R)	18R, 17D	48R, 27D	3R	Karl Mundt (R)	Francis Case (R)	1D, 1R	Eisenhower/ Nixon (R) ✓
1958	Joe Foss (R)	L. Roy Houck (R)	Clara Halls (R)	Phil Saunders (R)	Oscar Brosz (R)	Ed Elkins (R)	Bernard Linn (R)	18R, 17D	48R, 27D	3R	Karl Mundt (R)	Francis Case (R)	1D, 1R	Eisenhower/ Nixon (R) ✓
1959	Ralph Herseth (D)	John F. Lindley (D)	Selma Sandness (D)	Parnell J. Donahue (D)	Harriet Horning (D)	Al Hamre (R)	Bernard Linn (R)	20D, 15R	43R, 32D	3R	Karl Mundt (R)	Francis Case (R)	1D, 1R	Eisenhower/ Nixon (R) ✓
1960	Ralph Herseth (D)	John F. Lindley (D)	Selma Sandness (D)	Parnell J. Donahue (D)	Harriet Horning (D)	Al Hamre (R)	Bernard Linn (R)	20D, 15R	43R, 32D	3R	Karl Mundt (R)	Francis Case (R)	1D, 1R	Nixon/ Lodge (R) ✗
1961	Archie M. Gubbrud (R)	Joe Bottum (R) (Note: Resigned when appointed to a seat in the U.S. Senate.)	Essie Wiedenman (R)	A. C. Miller (R)	Betty Lou Casey (R)	Al Hamre (R)	Bernard Linn (R)	23R, 12D	57R, 18D	3R	Karl Mundt (R)	Francis Case (R)	2R	Nixon/ Lodge (R) ✗
1962	Archie M. Gubbrud (R)	Joe Bottum (R)	Essie Wiedenman (R)	A. C. Miller (R)	Betty Lou Casey (R)	Al Hamre (R)	Bernard Linn (R)	23R, 12D	57R, 18D	3R	Karl Mundt (R)	Francis Case (R)	2R	Nixon/ Lodge (R) ✗
1962	Archie M. Gubbrud (R)	vacant	Essie Wiedenman (R)	A. C. Miller (R)	Betty Lou Casey (R)	Al Hamre (R)	Bernard Linn (R)	23R, 12D	57R, 18D	3R	Karl Mundt (R)	Joe Bottum (R)	2R	Nixon/ Lodge (R) ✗
1963	Archie M. Gubbrud (R)	Nils Boe (R)	Essie Wiedenman (R)	Frank Farrar (R)	Al Hamre (R)	Lloyd Jorgenson (R)	Bernard Linn (R)	26R, 9D	58R, 17D	3R	Karl Mundt (R)	George McGovern (D)	2R	Nixon/ Lodge (R) ✗
1964	Archie M. Gubbrud (R)	Nils Boe (R)	Essie Wiedenman (R)	Frank Farrar (R)	Al Hamre (R)	Lloyd Jorgenson (R)	Bernard Linn (R)	26R, 9D	58R, 17D	3R	Karl Mundt (R)	George McGovern (D)	2R	Johnson/ Humphrey (D) ✓
1965	Nils Boe (R)	Lem Overpeck (R)	Alma Larson (R)	Frank Farrar (R)	Al Hamre (R)	Lloyd Jorgenson (R)	Bernard Linn (R)	19R, 15D, 1I	45R, 30D	3R	Karl Mundt (R)	George McGovern (D)	2R	Johnson/ Humphrey (D) ✓
1966	Nils Boe (R)	Lem Overpeck (R)	Alma Larson (R)	Frank Farrar (R)	Al Hamre (R)	Lloyd Jorgenson (R)	Bernard Linn (R)	19R, 15D, 1I	45R, 30D	3R	Karl Mundt (R)	George McGovern (D)	2R	Johnson/ Humphrey (D) ✓
1967	Nils Boe (R)	Lem Overpeck (R)	Alma Larson (R)	Frank Farrar (R)	Lloyd Jorgenson (R)	Al Hamre (R)	Bernard Linn (R)	29R, 6D	64R, 11D	3R	Karl Mundt (R)	George McGovern (D)	2R	Johnson/ Humphrey (D) ✓
1968	Nils Boe (R)	Lem Overpeck (R)	Alma Larson (R)	Frank Farrar (R)	Lloyd Jorgenson (R)	Al Hamre (R)	Bernard Linn (R)	29R, 6D	64R, 11D	3R	Karl Mundt (R)	George McGovern (D)	2R	Nixon/ Agnew (R) ✓
1969	Frank Farrar (R)	James Abdnor (R)	Alma Larson (R)	Gordon Mydland (R)	Alice Kundert (R)	Neal Strand (R)	Bernard Linn (R)	27R, 8D	59R, 16D	3R	Karl Mundt (R)	George McGovern (D)	2R	Nixon/ Agnew (R) ✓
1970	Frank Farrar (R)	James Abdnor (R)	Alma Larson (R)	Gordon Mydland (R)	Alice Kundert (R)	Neal Strand (R)	Bernard Linn (R)	27R, 8D	59R, 16D	3R	Karl Mundt (R)	George McGovern (D)	2R	Nixon/ Agnew (R) ✓
1971	Richard F. Kneip (D) (Note: Richard F. Kneip was the last South Dakota governor to serve a two-year term (1971-73 and 1973-75), and the first elected to a four-year term (in the 1974 election).)	William Dougherty (D)	Alma Larson (R)	Gordon Mydland (R)	Alice Kundert (R)	Neal Strand (R)	Ralph Ginn (R)	24R, 11D	45R, 30D	2R, 1D	Karl Mundt (R)	George McGovern (D)	2D	Nixon/ Agnew (R) ✓
1972	Richard F. Kneip (D)	William Dougherty (D)	Alma Larson (R)	Gordon Mydland (R)	Alice Kundert (R)	Neal Strand (R)	Ralph Ginn (R)	24R, 11D	45R, 30D	2R, 1D	Karl Mundt (R)	George McGovern (D)	2D	Nixon/ Agnew (R) ✓
1973	Richard F. Kneip (D)	William Dougherty (D)	Lorna Herseth (D)	Kermit A. Sande (D)	Alice Kundert (R)	David Volk (R)	George Kane (D)	18D, 17R	35R, 35D (Note: A Democrat, Gene N. LeBrun, was elected Speaker, and the Democrats organized and ran the House.)	2D, 1R	James Abourezk (D)	George McGovern (D)	1D, 1R	Nixon/ Agnew (R) ✓
1974	Richard F. Kneip (D)	William Dougherty (D)	Lorna Herseth (D)	Kermit A. Sande (D)	Alice Kundert (R)	David Volk (R)	George Kane (D)	18D, 17R	35R, 35D	2D, 1R	James Abourezk (D)	George McGovern (D)	1D, 1R	Nixon/ Agnew (R) ✓
1975	Richard F. Kneip (D)	Harvey Wollman (D) (Note: On July 24, 1978, Governor Kneip resigned to become United States Ambassador to Singapore. Lieutenant Governor Harvey L. Wollman succeeded to the office of governor on that date and served until January 1, 1979. The office of Lieutenant Governor remained vacant for the remainder of the term.)	Lorna Herseth (D)	Bill Janklow (R)	Alice Kundert (R)	David Volk (R)	George Kane (D)	19D, 16R	37R, 33D	3D	James Abourezk (D)	George McGovern (D)	2R	Nixon/ Agnew (R) ✓
1976	Richard F. Kneip (D)	Harvey Wollman (D)	Lorna Herseth (D)	Bill Janklow (R)	Alice Kundert (R)	David Volk (R)	George Kane (D)	19D, 16R	37R, 33D	3D	James Abourezk (D)	George McGovern (D)	2R	Ford/ Dole (R) ✗
1977	Richard F. Kneip (D)	Harvey Wollman (D)	Lorna Herseth (D)	Bill Janklow (R)	Alice Kundert (R)	David Volk (R)	George Kane (D)	24R, 11D	48R, 22D	2D, 1R	James Abourezk (D)	George McGovern (D)	2R	Ford/ Dole (R) ✗
1978	Harvey Wollman (D)	vacant	Lorna Herseth (D)	Bill Janklow (R)	Alice Kundert (R)	David Volk (R)	George Kane (D)	24R, 11D	48R, 22D	2D, 1R	James Abourezk (D)	George McGovern (D)	2R	Ford/ Dole (R) ✗
1979	Bill Janklow (R)	Lowell C. Hansen II (R)	Alice Kundert (R)	Mark V. Meierhenry (R)	Vern Larson (R)	David Volk (R)	John J. Gerken (R)	24R, 11D	48R, 22D	2D, 1R	Larry Pressler (R)	George McGovern (D)	1D, 1R	Ford/ Dole (R) ✗
1980	Bill Janklow (R)	Lowell C. Hansen II (R)	Alice Kundert (R)	Mark V. Meierhenry (R)	Vern Larson (R)	David Volk (R)	John J. Gerken (R)	24R, 11D	48R, 22D	2D, 1R	Larry Pressler (R)	George McGovern (D)	1D, 1R	Reagan/ Bush (R) ✓
1981	Bill Janklow (R)	Lowell C. Hansen II (R)	Alice Kundert (R)	Mark V. Meierhenry (R)	Vern Larson (R)	David Volk (R)	John J. Gerken (R)	25R, 10D	49R, 21D	2R, 1D	Larry Pressler (R)	James Abdnor (R)	1D, 1R	Reagan/ Bush (R) ✓
1982	Bill Janklow (R)	Lowell C. Hansen II (R)	Alice Kundert (R)	Mark V. Meierhenry (R)	Vern Larson (R)	David Volk (R)	John J. Gerken (R)	25R, 10D	49R, 21D	2R, 1D	Larry Pressler (R)	James Abdnor (R)	1D, 1R	Reagan/ Bush (R) ✓
1983	Bill Janklow (R)	Lowell C. Hansen II (R)	Alice Kundert (R)	Mark V. Meierhenry (R)	Vern Larson (R)	David Volk (R)	F. Julian Cheney (R)	26R, 9D	52R, 18D	2D, 1R	Larry Pressler (R)	James Abdnor (R)	Tom Daschle (D)	Reagan/ Bush (R) ✓
1984	Bill Janklow (R)	Lowell C. Hansen II (R)	Alice Kundert (R)	Mark V. Meierhenry (R)	Vern Larson (R)	David Volk (R)	David Volk (R)	26R, 9D	52R, 18D	2D, 1R	Larry Pressler (R)	James Abdnor (R)	Tom Daschle (D)	Reagan/ Bush (R) ✓
1985	Bill Janklow (R)	Lowell C. Hansen II (R)	Alice Kundert (R)	Mark V. Meierhenry (R)	Vern Larson (R)	David Volk (R)	John J. Gerken (R)	25R, 10D	57R, 13D	2D, 1R	Larry Pressler (R)	James Abdnor (R)	Tom Daschle (D)	Reagan/ Bush (R) ✓
1986	Bill Janklow (R)	Lowell C. Hansen II (R)	Alice Kundert (R)	Mark V. Meierhenry (R)	Vern Larson (R)	David Volk (R)	John J. Gerken (R)	25R, 10D	57R, 13D	2D, 1R	Larry Pressler (R)	James Abdnor (R)	Tom Daschle (D)	Reagan/ Bush (R) ✓
1987	George S. Mickelson (R)	Walter Dale Miller (R)	Joyce Hazeltine (R)	Roger Tellinghuisen (R)	Vern Larson (R)	David Volk (R)	Timothy Amdahl (R)	24R, 11D	48R, 22D	3D	Larry Pressler (R)	Tom Daschle (D)	Tim Johnson (D)	Reagan/ Bush (R) ✓
1988	George S. Mickelson (R)	Walter Dale Miller (R)	Joyce Hazeltine (R)	Roger Tellinghuisen (R)	Vern Larson (R)	David Volk (R)	Timothy Amdahl (R)	24R, 11D	48R, 22D	3D	Larry Pressler (R)	Tom Daschle (D)	Tim Johnson (D)	Bush/ Quayle (R) ✓
1989	George S. Mickelson (R)	Walter Dale Miller (R)	Joyce Hazeltine (R)	Roger Tellinghuisen (R)	Vern Larson (R)	David Volk (R)	Timothy Amdahl (R)	20R, 15D	46R, 24D	2D, 1R	Larry Pressler (R)	Tom Daschle (D)	Tim Johnson (D)	Bush/ Quayle (R) ✓
1990	George S. Mickelson (R)	Walter Dale Miller (R)	Joyce Hazeltine (R)	Roger Tellinghuisen (R)	Vern Larson (R)	David Volk (R)	Timothy Amdahl (R)	20R, 15D	46R, 24D	2D, 1R	Larry Pressler (R)	Tom Daschle (D)	Tim Johnson (D)	Bush/ Quayle (R) ✓
1991	George S. Mickelson (R)	Walter Dale Miller (R)	Joyce Hazeltine (R)	Mark Barnett (R)	Vern Larson (R)	G. Homer Harding (R)	Curt Johnson (D)	18R, 17D	45R, 25D	2D, 1R	Larry Pressler (R)	Tom Daschle (D)	Tim Johnson (D)	Bush/ Quayle (R) ✓
1992	George S. Mickelson (R)	Walter Dale Miller (R)	Joyce Hazeltine (R)	Mark Barnett (R)	Vern Larson (R)	G. Homer Harding (R)	Curt Johnson (D)	18R, 17D	45R, 25D	2D, 1R	Larry Pressler (R)	Tom Daschle (D)	Tim Johnson (D)	Bush/ Quayle (R) ✗
1993	Walter Dale Miller (R) (Note: Assumed office following the death or resignation of predecessor.)	Steve T. Kirby (R)	Joyce Hazeltine (R)	Mark Barnett (R)	Vern Larson (R)	G. Homer Harding (R)	Curt Johnson (D)	20D, 15R	41R, 29D	2D, 1R	Larry Pressler (R)	Tom Daschle (D)	Tim Johnson (D)	Bush/ Quayle (R) ✗
1994	Walter Dale Miller (R)	Steve T. Kirby (R)	Joyce Hazeltine (R)	Mark Barnett (R)	Vern Larson (R)	G. Homer Harding (R)	Curt Johnson (D)	20D, 15R	41R, 29D	2D, 1R	Larry Pressler (R)	Tom Daschle (D)	Tim Johnson (D)	Bush/ Quayle (R) ✗
1995	Bill Janklow (R)	Carole Hillard (R)	Joyce Hazeltine (R)	Mark Barnett (R)	Vern Larson (R)	Dick Butler (D)	Curt Johnson (D)	19R, 16D	45R, 24D, 1I	2D, 1R	Larry Pressler (R)	Tom Daschle (D)	Tim Johnson (D)	Bush/ Quayle (R) ✗
1996	Bill Janklow (R)	Carole Hillard (R)	Joyce Hazeltine (R)	Mark Barnett (R)	Vern Larson (R)	Dick Butler (D)	Curt Johnson (D)	19R, 16D	45R, 24D, 1I	2D, 1R	Larry Pressler (R)	Tom Daschle (D)	Tim Johnson (D)	Dole/ Kemp (R) ✗
1997	Bill Janklow (R)	Carole Hillard (R)	Joyce Hazeltine (R)	Mark Barnett (R)	Vern Larson (R)	Dick Butler (D)	Curt Johnson (D)	22R, 13D	47R, 23D	2D, 1R	Tim Johnson (D)	Tom Daschle (D)	John Thune (R)	Dole/ Kemp (R) ✗
1998	Bill Janklow (R)	Carole Hillard (R)	Joyce Hazeltine (R)	Mark Barnett (R)	Vern Larson (R)	Dick Butler (D)	Curt Johnson (D)	22R, 13D	47R, 23D	2D, 1R	Tim Johnson (D)	Tom Daschle (D)	John Thune (R)	Dole/ Kemp (R) ✗
1999	Bill Janklow (R)	Carole Hillard (R)	Joyce Hazeltine (R)	Mark Barnett (R)	Vern Larson (R)	Dick Butler (D)	Curt Johnson (D)	22R, 13D	52R, 18D	2D, 1R	Tim Johnson (D)	Tom Daschle (D)	John Thune (R)	Dole/ Kemp (R) ✗
2000	Bill Janklow (R)	Carole Hillard (R)	Joyce Hazeltine (R)	Mark Barnett (R)	Vern Larson (R)	Dick Butler (D)	Curt Johnson (D)	22R, 13D	52R, 18D	2D, 1R	Tim Johnson (D)	Tom Daschle (D)	John Thune (R)	Bush/ Cheney (R) ✓
2001	Bill Janklow (R)	Carole Hillard (R)	Joyce Hazeltine (R)	Mark Barnett (R)	Vern Larson (R)	Dick Butler (D)	Curt Johnson (D)	24R, 11D	50R, 20D	2D, 1R	Tim Johnson (D)	Tom Daschle (D)	John Thune (R)	Bush/ Cheney (R) ✓
2002	Bill Janklow (R)	Carole Hillard (R)	Joyce Hazeltine (R)	Mark Barnett (R)	Vern Larson (R)	Dick Butler (D)	Curt Johnson (D)	24R, 11D	50R, 20D	2D, 1R	Tim Johnson (D)	Tom Daschle (D)	John Thune (R)	Bush/ Cheney (R) ✓
2003	Mike Rounds (R)	Dennis Daugaard (R)	Chris Nelson (R)	Larry Long (R)	Rich Sattgast (R)	Vern Larson (R)	Bryce Healy (D)	26R, 9D	49R, 21D	2R, 1D	Tim Johnson (D)	Tom Daschle (D)	Bill Janklow (R) (Note: Resigned.)	Bush/ Cheney (R) ✓
2004	Mike Rounds (R)	Dennis Daugaard (R)	Chris Nelson (R)	Larry Long (R)	Rich Sattgast (R)	Vern Larson (R)	Bryce Healy (D)	26R, 9D	49R, 21D	2R, 1D	Tim Johnson (D)	Tom Daschle (D)	Stephanie Herseth Sandlin (D) (Note: First elected in special election.)	Bush/ Cheney (R) ✓
2005	Mike Rounds (R)	Dennis Daugaard (R)	Chris Nelson (R)	Larry Long (R)	Rich Sattgast (R)	Vern Larson (R)	Bryce Healy (D)	25R, 10D	51R, 19D	3R	Tim Johnson (D)	John Thune (R)	Stephanie Herseth Sandlin (D)	Bush/ Cheney (R) ✓
2006	Mike Rounds (R)	Dennis Daugaard (R)	Chris Nelson (R)	Larry Long (R)	Rich Sattgast (R)	Vern Larson (R)	Bryce Healy (D)	25R, 10D	51R, 19D	3R	Tim Johnson (D)	John Thune (R)	Stephanie Herseth Sandlin (D)	Bush/ Cheney (R) ✓
2007	Mike Rounds (R)	Dennis Daugaard (R)	Chris Nelson (R)	Larry Long (R)	Rich Sattgast (R)	Vern Larson (R)	Jarrod Johnson (R)	20R, 15D	50R, 20D	2R, 1D	Tim Johnson (D)	John Thune (R)	Stephanie Herseth Sandlin (D)	Bush/ Cheney (R) ✓
2008	Mike Rounds (R)	Dennis Daugaard (R)	Chris Nelson (R)	Larry Long (R)	Rich Sattgast (R)	Vern Larson (R)	Jarrod Johnson (R)	20R, 15D	50R, 20D	2R, 1D	Tim Johnson (D)	John Thune (R)	Stephanie Herseth Sandlin (D)	McCain/ Palin (R) ✗
2009	Mike Rounds (R)	Dennis Daugaard (R)	Chris Nelson (R)	Larry Long (R)	Rich Sattgast (R)	Vern Larson (R)	Jarrod Johnson (R)	21R, 14D	46R, 24D	2R, 1D	Tim Johnson (D)	John Thune (R)	Stephanie Herseth Sandlin (D)	McCain/ Palin (R) ✗
2010	Mike Rounds (R)	Dennis Daugaard (R)	Chris Nelson (R)	Marty Jackley (R)	Rich Sattgast (R)	Vern Larson (R)	Jarrod Johnson (R)	21R, 14D	46R, 24D	2R, 1D	Tim Johnson (D)	John Thune (R)	Stephanie Herseth Sandlin (D)	McCain/ Palin (R) ✗
2011	Dennis Daugaard (R)	Matt Michels (R)	Jason Gant (R)	Marty Jackley (R)	Steve Barnett (R)	Rich Sattgast (R)	Jarrod Johnson (R)	30R, 5D (Note: Democratic Senator-elect Eldon Nygaard switched to the Republicans prior to the start of the legislative session.)	50R, 19D, 1I	3R	Tim Johnson (D)	John Thune (R)	Kristi Noem (R)	McCain/ Palin (R) ✗
2012	Dennis Daugaard (R)	Matt Michels (R)	Jason Gant (R)	Marty Jackley (R)	Steve Barnett (R)	Rich Sattgast (R)	Jarrod Johnson (R)	30R, 5D	50R, 19D, 1I	3R	Tim Johnson (D)	John Thune (R)	Kristi Noem (R)	Romney/ Ryan (R) ✗
2013	Dennis Daugaard (R)	Matt Michels (R)	Jason Gant (R)	Marty Jackley (R)	Steve Barnett (R)	Rich Sattgast (R)	Vern Larson (R)	28R, 7D	53R, 17D	3R	Tim Johnson (D)	John Thune (R)	Kristi Noem (R)	Romney/ Ryan (R) ✗
2014	Dennis Daugaard (R)	Matt Michels (R)	Jason Gant (R)	Marty Jackley (R)	Steve Barnett (R)	Rich Sattgast (R)	Vern Larson (R)	28R, 7D	53R, 17D	3R	Tim Johnson (D)	John Thune (R)	Kristi Noem (R)	Romney/ Ryan (R) ✗
2015	Dennis Daugaard (R)	Matt Michels (R)	Shantel Krebs (R)	Marty Jackley (R)	Steve Barnett (R)	Rich Sattgast (R)	Ryan Brunner (R) (Note: Resigned to be a senior policy advisor in Governor Noem's office.)	27R, 8D	58R, 12D	3R	Mike Rounds (R)	John Thune (R)	Kristi Noem (R)	Romney/ Ryan (R) ✗
2016	Dennis Daugaard (R)	Matt Michels (R)	Shantel Krebs (R)	Marty Jackley (R)	Steve Barnett (R)	Rich Sattgast (R)	Ryan Brunner (R)	27R, 8D	58R, 12D	3R	Mike Rounds (R)	John Thune (R)	Kristi Noem (R)	Trump/ Pence (R) ✓
2017	Dennis Daugaard (R)	Matt Michels (R)	Shantel Krebs (R)	Marty Jackley (R)	Steve Barnett (R)	Rich Sattgast (R)	Ryan Brunner (R)	29R, 6D	60R, 10D	3R	Mike Rounds (R)	John Thune (R)	Kristi Noem (R)	Trump/ Pence (R) ✓
2018	Dennis Daugaard (R)	Matt Michels (R)	Shantel Krebs (R)	Marty Jackley (R)	Steve Barnett (R)	Rich Sattgast (R)	Ryan Brunner (R)	29R, 6D	60R, 10D	3R	Mike Rounds (R)	John Thune (R)	Kristi Noem (R)	Trump/ Pence (R) ✓
2019	Kristi Noem (R) (Note: Resigned to become United States Secretary of Homeland Security)	Larry Rhoden (R)	Steve Barnett (R)	Jason Ravnsborg (R) (Note: Jason Ravnsborg Impeached by the South Dakota House of Representatives on April 12, 2022, and suspended from his duties pending trial in the South Dakota Senate.)	Rich Sattgast (R)	Josh Haeder (R)	Ryan Brunner (R)	30R, 5D	59R, 11D	3R	Mike Rounds (R)	John Thune (R)	Dusty Johnson (R)	Trump/ Pence (R) ✓
2020	Kristi Noem (R)	Larry Rhoden (R)	Steve Barnett (R)	Jason Ravnsborg (R)	Rich Sattgast (R)	Josh Haeder (R)	Ryan Brunner (R)	30R, 5D	59R, 11D	3R	Mike Rounds (R)	John Thune (R)	Dusty Johnson (R)	Trump/ Pence (R) ✗
2021	Kristi Noem (R)	Larry Rhoden (R)	Steve Barnett (R)	Jason Ravnsborg (R)	Rich Sattgast (R)	Josh Haeder (R)	Ryan Brunner (R)	32R, 3D	62R, 8D	3R	Mike Rounds (R)	John Thune (R)	Dusty Johnson (R)	Trump/ Pence (R) ✗
2022	Kristi Noem (R)	Larry Rhoden (R)	Steve Barnett (R)	Jason Ravnsborg (R)	Rich Sattgast (R)	Josh Haeder (R)	Jarrod Johnson (R)	32R, 3D	62R, 8D	3R	Mike Rounds (R)	John Thune (R)	Dusty Johnson (R)	Trump/ Pence (R) ✗
2022	Kristi Noem (R)	Larry Rhoden (R)	Steve Barnett (R)	Mark Vargo (R)	Rich Sattgast (R)	Josh Haeder (R)	Jarrod Johnson (R)	32R, 3D	62R, 8D	3R	Mike Rounds (R)	John Thune (R)	Dusty Johnson (R)	Trump/ Pence (R) ✗
2023	Kristi Noem (R)	Larry Rhoden (R)	Monae Johnson (R)	Marty Jackley (R)	Rich Sattgast (R)	Josh Haeder (R)	Brock Greenfield (R)	31R, 4D	63R, 7D	3R	Mike Rounds (R)	John Thune (R)	Dusty Johnson (R)	Trump/ Pence (R) ✗
2024	Kristi Noem (R)	Larry Rhoden (R)	Monae Johnson (R)	Marty Jackley (R)	Rich Sattgast (R)	Josh Haeder (R)	Brock Greenfield (R)	31R, 4D	63R, 7D	3R	Mike Rounds (R)	John Thune (R)	Dusty Johnson (R)	Trump/ Vance (R) ✓
2025	Larry Rhoden (R)	Tony Venhuizen (R)	Monae Johnson (R)	Marty Jackley (R)	Rich Sattgast (R)	Josh Haeder (R)	Brock Greenfield (R)	32R, 3D	64R, 6D	3R	Mike Rounds (R)	John Thune (R)	Dusty Johnson (R)	Trump/ Vance (R) ✓
2026	Larry Rhoden (R)	Tony Venhuizen (R)	Monae Johnson (R)	Marty Jackley (R)	Rich Sattgast (R)	Josh Haeder (R)	Brock Greenfield (R)	32R, 3D	65R, 5D (Note: Peri Pourier (District 27) switched from the Democratic Party to the Republican Party.)	3R	Mike Rounds (R)	John Thune (R)	Dusty Johnson (R)	Trump/ Vance (R) ✓
2027	Larry Rhoden (R)	Tony Venhuizen (R)	Heather Baxter (R)	Lance Russell (R)	Catherine Barranco (R)	Melissa Hull (R)	Brock Greenfield (R)	33R, 2D	59R, 10D, 1I	3R	Mike Rounds (R)	John Thune (R)	Marty Jackley (R)	Trump/ Vance (R) ✓

Key to party colors and abbreviations for members of the U.S. Congress and other politicians or officials
Alaskan Independence (AKIP) Know Nothing (KN) American Labor (AL) Anti-Jacksonian (Anti-J); National Republican (NR) Anti-Administration (AA) Anti-Masonic (Anti-M) Conservative (Con) Covenant (Cov)	Democratic (D) Democratic–Farmer–Labor (DFL) Democratic–NPL (D-NPL) Dixiecrat (Dix), States' Rights (SR) Democratic-Republican (DR) Farmer–Labor (FL) Federalist (F); Pro-Administration (PA)	Free Soil (FS) Fusion (Fus) Greenback (GB) Independence (IPM) Jacksonian (J) Liberal (Lib) Libertarian (L) National Union (NU)	Nonpartisan League (NPL) Nullifier (N) Opposition Northern (O); Opposition Southern (O) Populist (Pop) Progressive (Prog) Prohibition (Proh) Readjuster (Rea)	Republican (R) Silver (Sv) Silver Republican (SvR) Socialist (Soc) Union (U) Unconditional Union (UU) Vermont Progressive (VP) Whig (W)	Independent (I) Nonpartisan (NP)

== See also ==
- Politics in South Dakota
- Government of South Dakota
