= 2018 South Dakota State Auditor election =

- November 6, 2018
Nominee	Rich Sattgast	Tom Cool
Party	Republican	Democratic
Popular vote	202,055	113,628
Percentage	64.01%	35.99%
- County results Sattgast: 50–60% 60–70% 70–80% 80–90% Cool: 50–60% 60–70% 70–80% 90–100%
State Auditor before election
Steve Barnett
Republican
Elected State Auditor
Rich Sattgast
Republican

The 2018 South Dakota State Auditor election was held on November 6, 2018, to elect the next state auditor of South Dakota. Incumbent Republican State Auditor Steve Barnett was term-limited and ran for secretary of state. Republican South Dakota State Treasurer Rich Sattgast defeated Democrat Tom Cool to succeed Barnett.

== Republican primary ==
=== Candidates ===
==== Nominee ====
- Rich Sattgast, state treasurer of South Dakota (2011–2019)

== Democratic primary ==
=== Candidates ===
==== Nominee ====
- Tom Cool, former journalist

== General election ==
=== Results ===
2018 South Dakota State Auditor election
Party	Candidate	Votes	%
Republican	Rich Sattgast	202,055	64.01%
Democratic	Tom Cool	113,628	35.99%
Total votes		315,683	100.00%
Republican hold			

==== By county ====
County	Rich Sattgast Republican		Tom Cool Democratic		Margin		Total
County	#	%	#	%	#	%	Total
Aurora	775	65.96%	400	34.04%	375	31.91%	1,175
Beadle	4,057	70.34%	1,711	29.66%	2,346	40.67%	5,768
Bennett	581	55.49%	466	44.51%	115	10.98%	1,047
Bon Homme	1,658	66.21%	846	33.79%	812	32.43%	2,504
Brookings	6,384	58.97%	4,442	41.03%	1,942	17.94%	10,826
Brown	8,186	61.17%	5,196	38.83%	2,990	22.34%	13,382
Brule	1,380	69.59%	603	30.41%	777	39.18%	1,983
Buffalo	160	31.62%	346	68.38%	-186	-36.76%	506
Butte	2,824	77.84%	804	22.16%	2,020	55.68%	3,628
Campbell	608	87.11%	90	12.89%	518	74.21%	698
Charles Mix	1,929	57.44%	1,429	42.56%	500	14.89%	3,358
Clark	1,095	71.34%	440	28.66%	655	42.67%	1,535
Clay	1,919	44.62%	2,382	55.38%	-463	-10.76%	4,301
Codington	6,631	68.31%	3,076	31.69%	3,555	36.62%	9,707
Corson	458	42.76%	613	57.24%	-155	-14.47%	1,071
Custer	3,042	72.12%	1,176	27.88%	1,866	44.24%	4,218
Davison	4,621	68.81%	2,095	31.19%	2,526	37.61%	6,716
Day	1,463	58.83%	1,024	41.17%	439	17.65%	2,487
Deuel	1,230	67.21%	600	32.79%	630	34.43%	1,830
Dewey	597	34.19%	1,149	65.81%	-552	-31.62%	1,746
Douglas	1,207	85.36%	207	14.64%	1,000	70.72%	1,414
Edmunds	1,124	72.10%	435	27.90%	689	44.19%	1,559
Fall River	2,185	71.50%	871	28.50%	1,314	43.00%	3,056
Faulk	783	77.45%	228	22.55%	555	54.90%	1,011
Grant	2,036	69.25%	904	30.75%	1,132	38.50%	2,940
Gregory	1,406	70.83%	579	29.17%	827	41.66%	1,985
Haakon	792	88.00%	108	12.00%	684	76.00%	900
Hamlin	1,945	76.94%	583	23.06%	1,362	53.88%	2,528
Hand	1,201	76.50%	369	23.50%	832	52.99%	1,570
Hanson	1,039	70.73%	430	29.27%	609	41.46%	1,469
Harding	585	89.86%	66	10.14%	519	79.72%	651
Hughes	5,712	74.08%	1,999	25.92%	3,713	48.15%	7,711
Hutchinson	2,314	76.75%	701	23.25%	1,613	53.50%	3,015
Hyde	490	76.68%	149	23.32%	341	53.36%	639
Jackson	568	61.01%	363	38.99%	205	22.02%	931
Jerauld	587	68.98%	264	31.02%	323	37.96%	851
Jones	428	83.76%	83	16.24%	345	67.51%	511
Kingsbury	1,572	69.04%	705	30.96%	867	38.08%	2,277
Lake	3,185	66.08%	1,635	33.92%	1,550	32.16%	4,820
Lawrence	6,990	67.43%	3,377	32.57%	3,613	34.85%	10,367
Lincoln	15,149	67.27%	7,370	32.73%	7,779	34.54%	22,519
Lyman	873	66.85%	433	33.15%	440	33.69%	1,306
Marshall	990	55.00%	810	45.00%	180	10.00%	1,800
McCook	1,607	70.42%	675	29.58%	932	40.84%	2,282
McPherson	831	82.52%	176	17.48%	655	65.04%	1,007
Meade	7,054	73.97%	2,482	26.03%	4,572	47.94%	9,536
Mellette	365	54.97%	299	45.03%	66	9.94%	664
Miner	640	66.12%	328	33.88%	312	32.23%	968
Minnehaha	37,587	57.70%	27,552	42.30%	10,035	15.41%	65,139
Moody	1,552	59.21%	1,069	40.79%	483	18.43%	2,621
Oglala Lakota	247	8.44%	2,678	91.56%	-2,431	-83.11%	2,925
Pennington	25,454	64.95%	13,738	35.05%	11,716	29.89%	39,192
Perkins	1,017	81.82%	226	18.18%	791	63.64%	1,243
Potter	945	83.63%	185	16.37%	760	67.26%	1,130
Roberts	1,791	52.37%	1,629	47.63%	162	4.74%	3,420
Sanborn	711	75.32%	233	24.68%	478	50.64%	944
Spink	1,736	65.66%	908	34.34%	828	31.32%	2,644
Stanley	1,094	76.45%	337	23.55%	757	52.90%	1,431
Sully	646	82.29%	139	17.71%	507	64.59%	785
Todd	459	21.66%	1,660	78.34%	-1,201	-56.68%	2,119
Tripp	1,806	77.31%	530	22.69%	1,276	54.62%	2,336
Turner	2,558	72.44%	973	27.56%	1,585	44.89%	3,531
Union	4,314	67.73%	2,055	32.27%	2,259	35.47%	6,369
Walworth	1,625	76.26%	506	23.74%	1,119	52.51%	2,131
Yankton	4,926	60.27%	3,247	39.73%	1,679	20.54%	8,173
Ziebach	331	42.60%	446	57.40%	-115	-14.80%	777
Totals	202,055	64.01%	113,628	35.99%	88,427	28.01%	315,683

Counties that flipped from Republican to Democratic

- Buffalo (largest city: Fort Thompson)
- Corson (largest city: McLaughlin)
- Dewey (largest city: North Eagle Butte)
- Ziebach (largest city: Dupree)
- Clay (largest city: Vermillion)

Counties that flipped from Libertarian to Democratic

- Oglala Lakota (largest city: Pine Ridge)
- Todd (largest city: Mission)
