= Kundert (surname) =

Kundert is a surname. Notable people with the surname include:

- Alice Kundert (1920–2013), American politician
- Andreas Kundert (born 1984), Swiss hurdler
- František Kundert (1891–1957), Czech cyclist
- Gust Kundert (1913–2000), American politician
- Otto Kundert (1888–1950), American politician
