= 2026 South Dakota State Auditor election =

- November 3, 2026
Candidate	Catherine Barranco	Tom Cool
Party	Republican	Democratic
Popular vote	182,694	109,392
Percentage	62.55%	37.45%
- Barranco: 50–60% 60–70% 70–80% 80–90% 90–100% Cool: 50–60% 60–70% 70–80% 80–90%
State Auditor before election
Rich Sattgast
Republican
Elected State Auditor
Catherine Barranco
Republican

The 2026 South Dakota State Auditor election was held on November 3, 2026, to elect the State Auditor of South Dakota. Incumbent Republican state auditor Rich Sattgast was term-limited and ineligible to run for re-election to a third consecutive term.

== Republican convention ==
=== Candidates ===
==== Nominee ====
- Catherine Barranco, economist and political organizer

==== Eliminated at convention ====
- Tamara Grove, state senator from the 26th district (2025–present)
- Renae Randall, financial analyst

==== Withdrawn ====
- David Barranco, former Sioux Falls city councilor

== Democratic convention ==
=== Candidates ===
==== Nominee ====
- Tom Cool, journalist
