= 2018 South Dakota State Treasurer election =

- November 6, 2018
Nominee	Josh Haeder	Aaron Matson
Party	Republican	Democratic
Popular vote	195,019	117,763
Percentage	62.35%	37.65%
- County results Haeder: 50–60% 60–70% 70–80% 80–90% Matson: 50–60% 60–70% 70–80% 90–100%
Treasurer before election
Rich Sattgast
Republican
Elected Treasurer
Josh Haeder
Republican

The 2018 South Dakota State Treasurer election was held on November 6, 2018, to elect the state treasurer of South Dakota. Incumbent Republican Rich Sattgast was term-limited and ran for state auditor. Republican Josh Haeder defeated Democrat Aaron Matson to succeed Sattgast.

== Republican primary ==
=== Candidates ===
==== Nominee ====
- Josh Haeder, Northeast Director for U.S. Senator Mike Rounds

== Democratic primary ==
=== Candidates ===
==== Nominee ====
- Aaron Matson, Communications Director for the South Dakota Democratic Party

== General election ==
=== Results ===
2018 South Dakota State Treasurer election
Party	Candidate	Votes	%	±%
Republican	Josh Haeder	195,019	62.35%	+1.17%
Democratic	Aaron Matson	117,763	37.65%	+4.18%
Total votes		312,782	100.00%	N/A
Republican hold				

==== By county ====
County	Josh Haeder Republican		Aaron Matson Democratic		Margin		Total
County	#	%	#	%	#	%	Total
Aurora	716	62.10%	437	37.90%	279	24.20%	1,153
Beadle	4,449	74.57%	1,517	25.43%	2,932	49.15%	5,966
Bennett	563	54.24%	475	45.76%	88	8.48%	1,038
Bon Homme	1,581	64.27%	879	35.73%	702	28.54%	2,460
Brookings	6,159	57.35%	4,580	42.65%	1,579	14.70%	10,739
Brown	7,862	59.09%	5,444	40.91%	2,418	18.17%	13,306
Brule	1,262	65.25%	672	34.75%	590	30.51%	1,934
Buffalo	150	29.64%	356	70.36%	-206	-40.71%	506
Butte	2,783	77.33%	816	22.67%	1,967	54.65%	3,599
Campbell	597	85.90%	98	14.10%	499	71.80%	695
Charles Mix	1,934	58.41%	1,377	41.59%	557	16.82%	3,311
Clark	1,041	68.44%	480	31.56%	561	36.88%	1,521
Clay	1,836	43.16%	2,418	56.84%	-582	-13.68%	4,254
Codington	6,307	65.57%	3,312	34.43%	2,995	31.14%	9,619
Corson	462	43.58%	598	56.42%	-136	-12.83%	1,060
Custer	3,002	71.51%	1,196	28.49%	1,806	43.02%	4,198
Davison	4,342	65.72%	2,265	34.28%	2,077	31.44%	6,607
Day	1,348	54.86%	1,109	45.14%	239	9.73%	2,457
Deuel	1,177	64.74%	641	35.26%	536	29.48%	1,818
Dewey	567	32.76%	1,164	67.24%	-597	-34.49%	1,731
Douglas	1,135	81.42%	259	18.58%	876	62.84%	1,394
Edmunds	1,100	70.92%	451	29.08%	649	41.84%	1,551
Fall River	2,166	71.20%	876	28.80%	1,290	42.41%	3,042
Faulk	762	77.20%	225	22.80%	537	54.41%	987
Grant	1,941	66.29%	987	33.71%	954	32.58%	2,928
Gregory	1,330	68.07%	624	31.93%	706	36.13%	1,954
Haakon	786	87.72%	110	12.28%	676	75.45%	896
Hamlin	1,889	75.53%	612	24.47%	1,277	51.06%	2,501
Hand	1,243	78.52%	340	21.48%	903	57.04%	1,583
Hanson	1,015	69.47%	446	30.53%	569	38.95%	1,461
Harding	575	88.46%	75	11.54%	500	76.92%	650
Hughes	5,221	69.65%	2,275	30.35%	2,946	39.30%	7,496
Hutchinson	2,234	74.07%	782	25.93%	1,452	48.14%	3,016
Hyde	467	74.96%	156	25.04%	311	49.92%	623
Jackson	566	60.66%	367	39.34%	199	21.33%	933
Jerauld	595	69.11%	266	30.89%	329	38.21%	861
Jones	414	81.98%	91	18.02%	323	63.96%	505
Kingsbury	1,538	68.05%	722	31.95%	816	36.11%	2,260
Lake	2,942	61.96%	1,806	38.04%	1,136	23.93%	4,748
Lawrence	6,766	65.56%	3,554	34.44%	3,212	31.12%	10,320
Lincoln	14,379	64.73%	7,834	35.27%	6,545	29.46%	22,213
Lyman	824	64.22%	459	35.78%	365	28.45%	1,283
Marshall	904	50.84%	874	49.16%	30	1.69%	1,778
McCook	1,492	66.43%	754	33.57%	738	32.86%	2,246
McPherson	813	81.46%	185	18.54%	628	62.93%	998
Meade	7,006	73.50%	2,526	26.50%	4,480	47.00%	9,532
Mellette	361	54.45%	302	45.55%	59	8.90%	663
Miner	587	62.38%	354	37.62%	233	24.76%	941
Minnehaha	35,719	55.78%	28,315	44.22%	7,404	11.56%	64,034
Moody	1,448	55.46%	1,163	44.54%	285	10.92%	2,611
Oglala Lakota	247	8.44%	2,679	91.56%	-2,432	-83.12%	2,926
Pennington	25,230	64.49%	13,891	35.51%	11,339	28.98%	39,121
Perkins	1,010	81.12%	235	18.88%	775	62.25%	1,245
Potter	911	82.29%	196	17.71%	715	64.59%	1,107
Roberts	1,689	49.46%	1,726	50.54%	-37	-1.08%	3,415
Sanborn	688	72.57%	260	27.43%	428	45.15%	948
Spink	1,615	61.59%	1,007	38.41%	608	23.19%	2,622
Stanley	1,018	73.18%	373	26.82%	645	46.37%	1,391
Sully	590	77.12%	175	22.88%	415	54.25%	765
Todd	456	21.51%	1,664	78.49%	-1,208	-56.98%	2,120
Tripp	1,720	74.46%	590	25.54%	1,130	48.92%	2,310
Turner	2,450	69.84%	1,058	30.16%	1,392	39.68%	3,508
Union	4,311	67.60%	2,066	32.40%	2,245	35.20%	6,377
Walworth	1,638	76.90%	492	23.10%	1,146	53.80%	2,130
Yankton	4,780	59.42%	3,265	40.58%	1,515	18.83%	8,045
Ziebach	310	40.16%	462	59.84%	-152	-19.69%	772
Totals	195,019	62.35%	117,763	37.65%	77,256	24.70%	312,782

Counties that flipped from Republican to Democratic

- Roberts (largest city: Sisseton)
