= 2014 South Dakota State Auditor election =

- November 4, 2014
Nominee	Steve Barnett	Kurt Evans
Party	Republican	Libertarian
Popular vote	191,755	48,103
Percentage	79.95%	20.05%
- County results Barnett: 50–60% 60–70% 70–80% 80–90% 90–100% Evans: 50–60% 70–80%
State Auditor before election
Steve Barnett
Republican
Elected State Auditor
Steve Barnett
Republican

The 2014 South Dakota State Auditor election was held on November 4, 2014, to elect the state auditor of South Dakota. Incumbent Republican State Auditor Steve Barnett was re-elected to a second term in office, defeating Libertarian challenger Kurt Evans in a landslide.

== Republican primary ==
=== Candidates ===
==== Nominee ====
- Steve Barnett, incumbent state auditor (2011–2019)

== Libertarian primary ==
=== Candidates ===
==== Nominee ====
- Kurt Evans, nominee for U.S. Senate in 2002

== General election ==
=== Results ===
2014 South Dakota State Auditor election
Party	Candidate	Votes	%
Republican	Steve Barnett (incumbent)	191,755	79.95%
Libertarian	Kurt Evans	48,103	20.05%
Total votes		239,858	100.00%
Republican hold			

==== By county ====
County	Steve Barnett Republican		Kurt Evans Libertarian		Margin		Total
County	#	%	#	%	#	%	Total
Aurora	846	82.38%	181	17.62%	665	64.75%	1,027
Beadle	4,083	81.50%	927	18.50%	3,156	62.99%	5,010
Bennett	551	68.96%	248	31.04%	303	37.92%	799
Bon Homme	1,680	80.38%	410	19.62%	1,270	60.77%	2,090
Brookings	6,116	79.04%	1,622	20.96%	4,494	58.08%	7,738
Brown	8,672	80.51%	2,100	19.49%	6,572	61.01%	10,772
Brule	1,328	82.64%	279	17.36%	1,049	65.28%	1,607
Buffalo	187	50.40%	184	49.60%	3	0.81%	371
Butte	2,361	81.72%	528	18.28%	1,833	63.45%	2,889
Campbell	534	91.44%	50	8.56%	484	82.88%	584
Charles Mix	2,212	78.13%	619	21.87%	1,593	56.27%	2,831
Clark	1,086	82.21%	235	17.79%	851	64.42%	1,321
Clay	2,162	71.85%	847	28.15%	1,315	43.70%	3,009
Codington	6,386	80.76%	1,521	19.24%	4,865	61.53%	7,907
Corson	496	64.25%	276	35.75%	220	28.50%	772
Custer	2,603	80.94%	613	19.06%	1,990	61.88%	3,216
Davison	4,550	84.07%	862	15.93%	3,688	68.14%	5,412
Day	1,491	74.48%	511	25.52%	980	48.95%	2,002
Deuel	1,280	81.53%	290	18.47%	990	63.06%	1,570
Dewey	671	55.87%	530	44.13%	141	11.74%	1,201
Douglas	1,076	90.57%	112	9.43%	964	81.14%	1,188
Edmunds	1,307	86.50%	204	13.50%	1,103	73.00%	1,511
Fall River	1,976	77.43%	576	22.57%	1,400	54.86%	2,552
Faulk	671	85.59%	113	14.41%	558	71.17%	784
Grant	2,022	80.69%	484	19.31%	1,538	61.37%	2,506
Gregory	1,401	85.32%	241	14.68%	1,160	70.65%	1,642
Haakon	724	90.16%	79	9.84%	645	80.32%	803
Hamlin	1,676	83.84%	323	16.16%	1,353	67.68%	1,999
Hand	1,159	87.14%	171	12.86%	988	74.29%	1,330
Hanson	1,019	86.21%	163	13.79%	856	72.42%	1,182
Harding	497	88.28%	66	11.72%	431	76.55%	563
Hughes	5,552	86.21%	888	13.79%	4,664	72.42%	6,440
Hutchinson	2,203	89.44%	260	10.56%	1,943	78.89%	2,463
Hyde	472	85.66%	79	14.34%	393	71.32%	551
Jackson	602	74.69%	204	25.31%	398	49.38%	806
Jerauld	614	81.11%	143	18.89%	471	62.22%	757
Jones	397	89.21%	48	10.79%	349	78.43%	445
Kingsbury	1,520	82.97%	312	17.03%	1,208	65.94%	1,832
Lake	3,358	81.15%	780	18.85%	2,578	62.30%	4,138
Lawrence	6,053	78.95%	1,614	21.05%	4,439	57.90%	7,667
Lincoln	12,416	84.81%	2,224	15.19%	10,192	69.62%	14,640
Lyman	884	79.07%	234	20.93%	650	58.14%	1,118
Marshall	1,110	77.84%	316	22.16%	794	55.68%	1,426
McCook	1,506	84.13%	284	15.87%	1,222	68.27%	1,790
McPherson	835	88.64%	107	11.36%	728	77.28%	942
Meade	6,019	81.81%	1,338	18.19%	4,681	63.63%	7,357
Mellette	432	72.24%	166	27.76%	266	44.48%	598
Miner	594	82.04%	130	17.96%	464	64.09%	724
Minnehaha	36,080	79.73%	9,175	20.27%	26,905	59.45%	45,255
Moody	1,556	75.53%	504	24.47%	1,052	51.07%	2,060
Pennington	22,963	79.31%	5,991	20.69%	16,972	58.62%	28,954
Perkins	978	84.09%	185	15.91%	793	68.19%	1,163
Potter	944	88.97%	117	11.03%	827	77.95%	1,061
Roberts	1,930	71.01%	788	28.99%	1,142	42.02%	2,718
Sanborn	617	80.55%	149	19.45%	468	61.10%	766
Shannon	491	24.08%	1,548	75.92%	-1,057	-51.84%	2,039
Spink	1,795	80.71%	429	19.29%	1,366	61.42%	2,224
Stanley	996	83.77%	193	16.23%	803	67.54%	1,189
Sully	559	87.76%	78	12.24%	481	75.51%	637
Todd	718	42.06%	989	57.94%	-271	-15.88%	1,707
Tripp	1,748	85.85%	288	14.15%	1,460	71.71%	2,036
Turner	2,440	83.68%	476	16.32%	1,964	67.35%	2,916
Union	3,654	81.27%	842	18.73%	2,812	62.54%	4,496
Walworth	1,506	86.55%	234	13.45%	1,272	73.10%	1,740
Yankton	5,053	77.92%	1,432	22.08%	3,621	55.84%	6,485
Ziebach	337	63.58%	193	36.42%	144	27.17%	530
Totals	191,755	79.95%	48,103	20.05%	143,652	59.89%	239,858
