= 2014 South Dakota Commissioner of School and Public Lands election =

- November 4, 2014
Nominee	Ryan Brunner	John English
Party	Republican	Libertarian
Popular vote	174,810	53,836
Percentage	76.45%	23.55%
- County results Brunner: 50–60% 60–70% 70–80% 80–90% >90% English: 50–60% 60–70% 70–80%
Commissioner of School and Public Lands before election
Vern Larson
Republican
Elected Commissioner of School and Public Lands
Ryan Brunner
Republican

The 2014 South Dakota Commissioner of School and Public Lands election was held on November 4, 2014, to elect the commissioner of school and public lands of South Dakota. Incumbent Republican Vern Larson, who was appointed to the position following the resignation of Jarrod Johnson in August 2013, did not seek election to a full term in office. Republican Ryan Brunner defeated Libertarian John English to succeed Larson.

== Republican primary ==
=== Candidates ===
==== Nominee ====
- Ryan Brunner, deputy commissioner of school and public lands (2012–2015)

==== Declined ====
- Vern Larson, incumbent commissioner of school and public lands (2013–2015)

== Libertarian primary ==
=== Candidates ===
==== Nominee ====
- John English

== General election ==
=== Results ===
2014 South Dakota Commissioner of School and Public Lands election
Party	Candidate	Votes	%
Republican	Ryan Brunner	174,810	76.45%
Libertarian	John English	53,836	23.55%
Total votes		228,646	100.00%
Republican hold			

==== By county ====
County	Ryan Brunner Republican		John English Libertarian		Margin		Total
County	#	%	#	%	#	%	Total
Aurora	750	79.45%	194	20.55%	556	58.90%	944
Beadle	3,734	78.86%	1,001	21.14%	2,733	57.72%	4,735
Bennett	531	69.05%	238	30.95%	293	38.10%	769
Bon Homme	1,514	75.10%	502	24.90%	1,012	50.20%	2,016
Brookings	5,946	77.92%	1,685	22.08%	4,261	55.84%	7,631
Brown	7,373	74.59%	2,512	25.41%	4,861	49.18%	9,885
Brule	1,222	79.15%	322	20.85%	900	58.29%	1,544
Buffalo	164	46.33%	190	53.67%	-26	-7.34%	354
Butte	2,425	81.02%	568	18.98%	1,857	62.04%	2,993
Campbell	506	89.88%	57	10.12%	449	79.75%	563
Charles Mix	1,964	73.86%	695	26.14%	1,269	47.72%	2,659
Clark	999	79.67%	255	20.33%	744	59.33%	1,254
Clay	1,889	66.68%	944	33.32%	945	33.36%	2,833
Codington	5,757	77.82%	1,641	22.18%	4,116	55.64%	7,398
Corson	492	64.40%	272	35.60%	220	28.80%	764
Custer	2,443	77.75%	699	22.25%	1,744	55.51%	3,142
Davison	4,036	79.81%	1,021	20.19%	3,015	59.62%	5,057
Day	1,324	70.39%	557	29.61%	767	40.78%	1,881
Deuel	1,112	76.32%	345	23.68%	767	52.64%	1,457
Dewey	622	53.85%	533	46.15%	89	7.71%	1,155
Douglas	1,024	90.30%	110	9.70%	914	80.60%	1,134
Edmunds	1,182	83.06%	241	16.94%	941	66.13%	1,423
Fall River	1,877	75.29%	616	24.71%	1,261	50.58%	2,493
Faulk	624	85.36%	107	14.64%	517	70.73%	731
Grant	1,821	76.93%	546	23.07%	1,275	53.87%	2,367
Gregory	1,244	79.24%	326	20.76%	918	58.47%	1,570
Haakon	712	90.70%	73	9.30%	639	81.40%	785
Hamlin	1,552	80.88%	367	19.12%	1,185	61.75%	1,919
Hand	1,088	86.01%	177	13.99%	911	72.02%	1,265
Hanson	917	83.06%	187	16.94%	730	66.12%	1,104
Harding	497	87.96%	68	12.04%	429	75.93%	565
Hughes	5,218	85.37%	894	14.63%	4,324	70.75%	6,112
Hutchinson	2,014	87.07%	299	12.93%	1,715	74.15%	2,313
Hyde	452	85.44%	77	14.56%	375	70.89%	529
Jackson	571	72.37%	218	27.63%	353	44.74%	789
Jerauld	547	82.26%	118	17.74%	429	64.51%	665
Jones	368	85.78%	61	14.22%	307	71.56%	429
Kingsbury	1,397	80.10%	347	19.90%	1,050	60.21%	1,744
Lake	3,021	77.30%	887	22.70%	2,134	54.61%	3,908
Lawrence	5,781	76.62%	1,764	23.38%	4,017	53.24%	7,545
Lincoln	11,294	81.07%	2,637	18.93%	8,657	62.14%	13,931
Lyman	777	73.51%	280	26.49%	497	47.02%	1,057
Marshall	961	73.30%	350	26.70%	611	46.61%	1,311
McCook	1,324	80.00%	331	20.00%	993	60.00%	1,655
McPherson	804	89.63%	93	10.37%	711	79.26%	897
Meade	5,840	79.98%	1,462	20.02%	4,378	59.96%	7,302
Mellette	368	63.67%	210	36.33%	158	27.34%	578
Miner	529	78.25%	147	21.75%	382	56.51%	676
Minnehaha	31,487	74.31%	10,887	25.69%	20,600	48.61%	42,374
Moody	1,406	71.81%	552	28.19%	854	43.62%	1,958
Pennington	21,649	76.94%	6,490	23.06%	15,159	53.87%	28,139
Perkins	979	83.82%	189	16.18%	790	67.64%	1,168
Potter	868	86.28%	138	13.72%	730	72.56%	1,006
Roberts	1,738	66.92%	859	33.08%	879	33.85%	2,597
Sanborn	562	78.49%	154	21.51%	408	56.98%	716
Shannon	423	21.14%	1,578	78.86%	-1,155	-57.72%	2,001
Spink	1,572	77.32%	461	22.68%	1,111	54.65%	2,033
Stanley	934	82.00%	205	18.00%	729	64.00%	1,139
Sully	533	86.25%	85	13.75%	448	72.49%	618
Todd	591	35.37%	1,080	64.63%	-489	-29.26%	1,671
Tripp	1,572	80.66%	377	19.34%	1,195	61.31%	1,949
Turner	2,208	79.77%	560	20.23%	1,648	59.54%	2,768
Union	3,464	79.65%	885	20.35%	2,579	59.30%	4,349
Walworth	1,420	85.18%	247	14.82%	1,173	70.37%	1,667
Yankton	4,457	72.60%	1,682	27.40%	2,775	45.20%	6,139
Ziebach	337	64.81%	183	35.19%	154	29.62%	520
Totals	174,810	76.45%	53,836	23.55%	120,974	52.91%	228,646
