= 2014 South Dakota State Treasurer election =

- November 4, 2014
Nominee	Rich Sattgast	Denny Pierson	Ken Santema
Party	Republican	Democratic	Libertarian
Popular vote	155,758	85,202	13,615
Percentage	61.18%	33.47%	5.35%
- County results Sattgast: 40–50% 50–60% 60–70% 70–80% 80–90% Pierson: 40–50% 50–60% 60–70% 70–80% 80–90%
Treasurer before election
Rich Sattgast
Republican
Elected Treasurer
Rich Sattgast
Republican

The 2014 South Dakota State Treasurer election was held on November 4, 2014, to elect the state treasurer of South Dakota. Incumbent Republican Rich Sattgast was re-elected to a second term in office, defeating Democratic challenger Denny Pierson in a landslide.

== Republican primary ==
=== Candidates ===
==== Nominee ====
- Rich Sattgast, incumbent state treasurer (2011–2019)

== Democratic primary ==
=== Candidates ===
==== Nominee ====
- Denny Pierson, retired insurance agent

== Libertarian primary ==
=== Candidates ===
==== Nominee ====
- Ken Santema, project manager

== General election ==
=== Results ===
2014 South Dakota State Treasurer election
Party	Candidate	Votes	%
Republican	Rich Sattgast (incumbent)	155,758	61.18%
Democratic	Denny Pierson	85,202	33.47%
Libertarian	Ken Santema	13,615	5.35%
Total votes		254,575	100.00%
Republican hold			

==== By county ====
County	Rich Sattgast Republican		Denny Pierson Democratic		Ken Santema Libertarian		Margin		Total
County	#	%	#	%	#	%	#	%	Total
Aurora	552	50.83%	491	45.21%	43	3.96%	61	5.62%	1,086
Beadle	3,588	67.49%	1,542	29.01%	186	3.50%	2,046	38.49%	5,316
Bennett	440	51.76%	354	41.65%	56	6.59%	86	10.12%	850
Bon Homme	1,286	58.83%	792	36.23%	108	4.94%	494	22.60%	2,186
Brookings	4,657	56.12%	2,954	35.59%	688	8.29%	1,703	20.52%	8,299
Brown	6,206	56.34%	4,202	38.15%	607	5.51%	2,004	18.19%	11,015
Brule	1,032	62.97%	536	32.70%	71	4.33%	496	30.26%	1,639
Buffalo	133	30.86%	278	64.50%	20	4.64%	-145	-33.64%	431
Butte	2,115	71.67%	611	20.70%	225	7.62%	1,504	50.97%	2,951
Campbell	476	81.93%	91	15.66%	14	2.41%	385	66.27%	581
Charles Mix	1,631	55.19%	1,203	40.71%	121	4.09%	428	14.48%	2,955
Clark	918	67.90%	378	27.96%	56	4.14%	540	39.94%	1,352
Clay	1,505	44.40%	1,687	49.76%	198	5.84%	-182	-5.37%	3,390
Codington	5,119	62.46%	2,650	32.33%	427	5.21%	2,469	30.12%	8,196
Corson	382	44.37%	429	49.83%	50	5.81%	-47	-5.46%	861
Custer	2,273	66.38%	884	25.82%	267	7.80%	1,389	40.57%	3,424
Davison	3,216	56.47%	2,265	39.77%	214	3.76%	951	16.70%	5,695
Day	1,083	50.35%	951	44.21%	117	5.44%	132	6.14%	2,151
Deuel	950	58.93%	547	33.93%	115	7.13%	403	25.00%	1,612
Dewey	473	34.60%	820	59.99%	74	5.41%	-347	-25.38%	1,367
Douglas	932	77.28%	248	20.56%	26	2.16%	684	56.72%	1,206
Edmunds	997	64.87%	470	30.58%	70	4.55%	527	34.29%	1,537
Fall River	1,718	64.95%	718	27.15%	209	7.90%	1,000	37.81%	2,645
Faulk	602	73.06%	194	23.54%	28	3.40%	408	49.51%	824
Grant	1,602	61.45%	876	33.60%	129	4.95%	726	27.85%	2,607
Gregory	1,086	64.34%	526	31.16%	76	4.50%	560	33.18%	1,688
Haakon	644	81.21%	120	15.13%	29	3.66%	524	66.08%	793
Hamlin	1,439	69.82%	499	24.21%	123	5.97%	940	45.61%	2,061
Hand	1,045	74.11%	324	22.98%	41	2.91%	721	51.13%	1,410
Hanson	792	63.92%	398	32.12%	49	3.95%	394	31.80%	1,239
Harding	446	79.93%	73	13.08%	39	6.99%	373	66.85%	558
Hughes	4,974	74.75%	1,432	21.52%	248	3.73%	3,542	53.23%	6,654
Hutchinson	1,797	72.78%	602	24.38%	70	2.84%	1,195	48.40%	2,469
Hyde	421	73.47%	134	23.39%	18	3.14%	287	50.09%	573
Jackson	521	61.51%	279	32.94%	47	5.55%	242	28.57%	847
Jerauld	472	61.22%	273	35.41%	26	3.37%	199	25.81%	771
Jones	359	80.49%	69	15.47%	18	4.04%	290	65.02%	446
Kingsbury	1,233	63.72%	608	31.42%	94	4.86%	625	32.30%	1,935
Lake	2,649	60.42%	1,507	34.38%	228	5.20%	1,142	26.05%	4,384
Lawrence	5,407	65.56%	2,258	27.38%	583	7.07%	3,149	38.18%	8,248
Lincoln	10,355	66.94%	4,393	28.40%	721	4.66%	5,962	38.54%	15,469
Lyman	743	63.61%	367	31.42%	58	4.97%	376	32.19%	1,168
Marshall	783	50.22%	719	46.12%	57	3.66%	64	4.11%	1,559
McCook	1,153	61.17%	650	34.48%	82	4.35%	503	26.68%	1,885
McPherson	736	78.13%	165	17.52%	41	4.35%	571	60.62%	942
Meade	5,295	69.56%	1,785	23.45%	532	6.99%	3,510	46.11%	7,612
Mellette	348	54.98%	241	38.07%	44	6.95%	107	16.90%	633
Miner	462	58.63%	297	37.69%	29	3.68%	165	20.94%	788
Minnehaha	28,217	57.12%	18,668	37.79%	2,515	5.09%	9,549	19.33%	49,400
Moody	1,180	54.13%	887	40.69%	113	5.18%	293	13.44%	2,180
Pennington	20,189	65.28%	8,798	28.45%	1,940	6.27%	11,391	36.83%	30,927
Perkins	839	70.03%	272	22.70%	87	7.26%	567	47.33%	1,198
Potter	818	76.59%	215	20.13%	35	3.28%	603	56.46%	1,068
Roberts	1,431	48.71%	1,389	47.28%	118	4.02%	42	1.43%	2,938
Sanborn	509	63.55%	257	32.08%	35	4.37%	252	31.46%	801
Shannon	219	8.48%	2,216	85.76%	149	5.77%	-1,997	-77.28%	2,584
Spink	1,414	61.19%	804	34.79%	93	4.02%	610	26.40%	2,311
Stanley	919	74.59%	261	21.19%	52	4.22%	658	53.41%	1,232
Sully	508	77.20%	117	17.78%	33	5.02%	391	59.42%	658
Todd	441	21.65%	1,473	72.31%	123	6.04%	-1,032	-50.66%	2,037
Tripp	1,508	72.40%	491	23.57%	84	4.03%	1,017	48.82%	2,083
Turner	2,001	66.19%	881	29.14%	141	4.66%	1,120	37.05%	3,023
Union	3,096	65.18%	1,405	29.58%	249	5.24%	1,691	35.60%	4,750
Walworth	1,267	71.83%	422	23.92%	75	4.25%	845	47.90%	1,764
Yankton	3,912	58.07%	2,462	36.54%	363	5.39%	1,450	21.52%	6,737
Ziebach	244	42.36%	294	51.04%	38	6.60%	-50	-8.68%	576
Totals	155,758	61.18%	85,202	33.47%	13,615	5.35%	70,556	27.72%	254,575
