= 2026 South Dakota State Treasurer election =

- November 3, 2026
Candidate	Melissa Hull	Margaret Kuipers
Party	Republican	Democratic
Popular vote	182,344	109,738
Percentage	62.4%	37.6%
- Hull: 50–60% 60–70% 70–80% 80–90% 90–100% Kuipers: 50–60% 60–70% 70–80% 80–90%
State Treasurer before election
Josh Haeder
Republican
Elected State Treasurer
Melissa Hull
Republican

The 2026 South Dakota State Treasurer election was held on November 3, 2026, to elect the State Treasurer of South Dakota. Incumbent Republican state treasurer Josh Haeder was term-limited and ineligible to run for re-election to a third term.

== Republican convention ==
=== Candidates ===
==== Nominee ====
- Melissa Hull, financial manager

==== Eliminated at convention ====
- Heath Shields, businessman

==== Withdrawn ====
- Jeff Monroe

== Democratic convention ==
=== Candidates ===
==== Nominee ====
- Margaret Kuipers, phlebotomist and candidate for South Dakota House of Representatives in 2022
