= Steven Barnett =

Steven Barnett may refer to:

- Steve Barnett (American football) (1941–2018), American football offensive lineman
- Steven Barnett (water polo) (born 1943), American Olympic water polo player
- Steven Barnett (diver) (born 1979), Australian Olympic diver
- Steve Barnett (music executive) (born 1952), American record-company executive
- Steve Barnett (politician) (born 1978), Secretary of State of South Dakota

== See also ==
- Stephen Barnett (1935–2009), American law professor and legal scholar
- Stephen Barrett (born 1933), American psychiatrist, webmaster of Quackwatch
