= Gust Kundert =

American politician

Gust Kundert (December 7, 1913 – March 3, 2000) was an American politician.

From Mound City, South Dakota, Kundert served in the South Dakota House of Representatives from 1983 to 1988 as a Republican. His father Otto Kundert and his sister Alice Kundert also served in the South Dakota House of Representatives.
