= Claude Henry Allen =

American lawyer and politician

Claude Henry Allen (April 4, 1899 – November 25, 1974) was an American lawyer and politician.

Allen was born in Mound City, Campbell County, South Dakota. He moved to Minnesota in 1916 and received his law degree from William Mitchell College of Law (formerly St. Paul College of Law) in 1927. Allen lived in Saint Paul, Minnesota with his wife and family and practiced law in Saint Paul. Allen served as the Ramsey County, Minnesota assistant county attorney and as deputy clerk of the probate court. Allen served in the Minnesota House of Representatives from 1937 to 1956 and in the Minnesota Senate from 1959 to 1966. He died from cancer at the Masonic Home and Care Center in Bloomington, Minnesota.
