= 2018 South Dakota Secretary of State election =

- November 6, 2018
Nominee	Steve Barnett	Alexandra Frederick
Party	Republican	Democratic
Popular vote	211,064	112,807
Percentage	65.17%	34.83%
- County results Barnett: 50–60% 60–70% 70–80% 80–90% >90% Frederick: 50–60% 60–70% 70–80% >90%
Secretary of State before election
Shantel Krebs
Republican
Elected Secretary of State
Steve Barnett
Republican

The 2018 South Dakota Secretary of State election was held on November 6, 2018, to elect the next secretary of state of South Dakota. Incumbent Republican Shantel Krebs retired to run for U.S. House of Representatives. Republican South Dakota State Auditor Steve Barnett defeated Democrat Alexandra Frederick in a landslide to succeed Krebs.

== Republican primary ==
=== Candidates ===
==== Nominee ====
- Steve Barnett, state auditor of South Dakota (2011–2019)

==== Declined ====
- Shantel Krebs, incumbent secretary of state (2015–2019) (ran for U.S. House of Representatives)

== Democratic primary ==
=== Candidates ===
==== Nominee ====
- Alexandra Frederick, artist

== General election ==
=== Predictions ===
Source	Ranking	As of
Governing	Safe R	June 5, 2018

=== Results ===
2018 South Dakota Secretary of State election
Party	Candidate	Votes	%	±%
Republican	Steve Barnett	211,064	65.17%	+4.94%
Democratic	Alexandra Frederick	112,807	34.83%	+2.25%
Total votes		323,871	100.00%	N/A
Republican hold				

==== By county ====
County	Steve Barnett Republican		Alexandra Frederick Democratic		Margin		Total
County	#	%	#	%	#	%	Total
Aurora	830	67.98%	391	32.02%	439	35.95%	1,221
Beadle	3,425	61.10%	2,181	38.90%	1,244	22.19%	5,606
Bennett	608	57.69%	446	42.31%	162	15.37%	1,054
Bon Homme	1,781	69.08%	797	30.92%	984	38.17%	2,578
Brookings	6,744	60.14%	4,469	39.86%	2,275	20.29%	11,213
Brown	9,503	68.02%	4,468	31.98%	5,035	36.04%	13,971
Brule	1,439	71.27%	580	28.73%	859	42.55%	2,019
Buffalo	165	31.79%	354	68.21%	-189	-36.42%	519
Butte	2,908	78.87%	779	21.13%	2,129	57.74%	3,687
Campbell	633	88.66%	81	11.34%	552	77.31%	714
Charles Mix	2,218	64.18%	1,238	35.82%	980	28.36%	3,456
Clark	1,127	71.01%	460	28.99%	667	42.03%	1,587
Clay	2,017	45.90%	2,377	54.10%	-360	-8.19%	4,394
Codington	6,975	69.29%	3,091	30.71%	3,884	38.59%	10,066
Corson	474	43.65%	612	56.35%	-138	-12.71%	1,086
Custer	3,102	72.36%	1,185	27.64%	1,917	44.72%	4,287
Davison	4,869	70.59%	2,029	29.41%	2,840	41.17%	6,898
Day	1,586	60.79%	1,023	39.21%	563	21.58%	2,609
Deuel	1,300	69.00%	584	31.00%	716	38.00%	1,884
Dewey	642	36.23%	1,130	63.77%	-488	-27.54%	1,772
Douglas	1,266	88.04%	172	11.96%	1,094	76.08%	1,438
Edmunds	1,258	77.18%	372	22.82%	886	54.36%	1,630
Fall River	2,241	72.34%	857	27.66%	1,384	44.67%	3,098
Faulk	837	80.64%	201	19.36%	636	61.27%	1,038
Grant	2,134	70.34%	900	29.66%	1,234	40.67%	3,034
Gregory	1,518	75.04%	505	24.96%	1,013	50.07%	2,023
Haakon	832	89.85%	94	10.15%	738	79.70%	926
Hamlin	2,009	77.57%	581	22.43%	1,428	55.14%	2,590
Hand	1,228	76.99%	367	23.01%	861	53.98%	1,595
Hanson	1,119	73.72%	399	23.28%	720	47.43%	1,518
Harding	612	91.62%	56	8.38%	556	83.23%	668
Hughes	5,860	74.91%	1,963	25.09%	3,897	49.81%	7,823
Hutchinson	2,490	79.55%	640	20.45%	1,850	59.11%	3,130
Hyde	496	76.66%	151	23.34%	345	53.32%	647
Jackson	603	63.14%	352	36.86%	251	26.28%	955
Jerauld	599	69.01%	269	30.99%	330	38.02%	868
Jones	439	83.62%	86	16.38%	353	67.24%	525
Kingsbury	1,618	69.38%	714	30.62%	904	38.77%	2,332
Lake	3,331	67.48%	1,605	32.52%	1,726	34.97%	4,936
Lawrence	6,992	66.31%	3,552	33.69%	3,440	32.63%	10,544
Lincoln	15,683	68.04%	7,368	31.96%	8,315	36.07%	23,051
Lyman	915	67.68%	437	32.32%	478	35.36%	1,352
Marshall	1,069	57.38%	794	42.62%	275	14.76%	1,863
McCook	1,693	71.77%	666	28.23%	1,027	43.54%	2,359
McPherson	876	84.88%	156	15.12%	720	69.77%	1,032
Meade	7,276	74.17%	2,534	25.83%	4,742	48.34%	9,810
Mellette	383	55.91%	302	44.09%	81	11.82%	685
Miner	664	66.27%	338	33.73%	326	32.53%	1,002
Minnehaha	39,634	59.19%	27,329	40.81%	12,305	18.38%	66,963
Moody	1,633	60.48%	1,067	39.52%	566	20.96%	2,700
Oglala Lakota	276	9.30%	2,692	90.70%	-2,416	-81.40%	2,968
Pennington	25,954	64.68%	14,175	35.32%	11,779	29.35%	40,129
Perkins	1,057	82.97%	217	17.03%	840	65.93%	1,274
Potter	992	85.52%	168	14.48%	824	71.03%	1,160
Roberts	1,879	53.18%	1,654	46.82%	225	6.37%	3,533
Sanborn	738	76.00%	233	24.00%	505	52.01%	971
Spink	1,844	68.09%	864	31.91%	980	36.19%	2,708
Stanley	1,126	77.39%	329	22.61%	797	54.78%	1,455
Sully	656	82.31%	141	17.69%	515	64.62%	797
Todd	488	22.30%	1,700	77.70%	-1,212	-55.39%	2,188
Tripp	1,860	77.79%	531	22.21%	1,329	55.58%	2,391
Turner	2,730	74.27%	946	25.73%	1,784	48.53%	3,676
Union	4,444	68.54%	2,040	31.46%	2,404	37.08%	6,484
Walworth	1,752	80.11%	435	19.89%	1,317	60.22%	2,187
Yankton	5,276	62.69%	3,140	37.31%	2,136	25.38%	8,416
Ziebach	338	43.44%	440	56.56%	-102	-13.11%	778
Totals	211,064	65.17%	112,807	34.83%	98,257	30.34%	323,871

Counties that flipped from Democratic to Republican

- Day (largest city: Webster)
- Marshall (largest city: Britton)
- Roberts (largest city: Sisseton)
