= 2022 South Dakota State Treasurer election =

- November 8, 2022
Nominee	Josh Haeder	John Cunningham
Party	Republican	Democratic
Popular vote	219,334	107,916
Percentage	67.02%	32.98%
- County results Haeder: 50–60% 60–70% 70–80% 80–90% >90% Cunningham: 50–60% 60–70% 70–80% 80–90%
Treasurer before election
Josh Haeder
Republican
Elected Treasurer
Josh Haeder
Republican

The 2022 South Dakota State Treasurer election was held on November 8, 2022, to elect the state treasurer of South Dakota. Incumbent Republican Josh Haeder was re-elected to a second term in office, defeating Democratic challenger John Cunningham in a landslide.

== Republican primary ==
=== Candidates ===
==== Nominee ====
- Josh Haeder, incumbent state treasurer (2019–present)

== Democratic primary ==
=== Candidates ===
==== Nominee ====
- John Cunningham, retired Army Reserve Lieutenant Colonel

== General election ==
=== Results ===
2022 South Dakota State Treasurer election
Party	Candidate	Votes	%	±%
Republican	Josh Haeder (incumbent)	219,334	67.02%	+4.67%
Democratic	John Cunningham	107,916	32.98%	−4.67%
Total votes		327,250	100.00%	N/A
Republican hold				

==== By county ====
County	Josh Haeder Republican		John Cunningham Democratic		Margin		Total
County	#	%	#	%	#	%	Total
Aurora	811	72.87%	302	27.13%	509	45.73%	1,113
Beadle	4,656	80.81%	1,106	19.19%	3,550	61.61%	5,762
Bennett	582	60.88%	374	39.12%	208	21.76%	956
Bon Homme	1,745	73.72%	622	26.28%	1,123	47.44%	2,367
Brookings	7,096	61.96%	4,356	38.04%	2,740	23.93%	11,452
Brown	8,482	64.56%	4,657	35.44%	3,825	29.11%	13,139
Brule	1,375	70.77%	568	29.23%	807	41.53%	1,943
Buffalo	139	37.07%	236	62.93%	-97	-25.87%	375
Butte	3,217	80.71%	769	19.29%	2,448	61.41%	3,986
Campbell	553	86.95%	83	13.05%	470	73.90%	636
Charles Mix	2,014	69.45%	886	30.55%	1,128	38.90%	2,900
Clark	1,128	77.21%	333	22.79%	795	54.41%	1,461
Clay	2,116	48.11%	2,282	51.89%	-166	-3.77%	4,398
Codington	7,203	70.79%	2,972	29.21%	4,231	41.58%	10,175
Corson	499	56.32%	387	43.68%	112	12.64%	886
Custer	3,680	75.85%	1,172	24.15%	2,508	51.69%	4,852
Davison	4,761	70.26%	2,015	29.74%	2,746	40.53%	6,776
Day	1,502	64.05%	843	35.95%	659	28.10%	2,345
Deuel	1,412	75.03%	470	24.97%	942	50.05%	1,882
Dewey	611	40.92%	882	59.08%	-271	-18.15%	1,493
Douglas	1,210	88.13%	163	11.87%	1,047	76.26%	1,373
Edmunds	1,230	78.05%	346	21.95%	884	56.09%	1,576
Fall River	2,685	76.45%	827	23.55%	1,858	52.90%	3,512
Faulk	730	81.38%	167	18.62%	563	62.76%	897
Grant	2,201	73.93%	776	26.07%	1,425	47.87%	2,977
Gregory	1,533	79.68%	391	20.32%	1,142	59.36%	1,924
Haakon	846	90.97%	84	9.03%	762	81.94%	930
Hamlin	2,034	80.55%	491	19.45%	1,543	61.11%	2,525
Hand	1,219	84.36%	226	15.64%	993	68.72%	1,445
Hanson	1,216	79.84%	307	20.16%	909	59.68%	1,523
Harding	612	94.01%	39	5.99%	573	88.02%	651
Hughes	5,304	73.71%	1,892	26.29%	3,412	47.42%	7,196
Hutchinson	2,385	80.74%	569	19.26%	1,816	61.48%	2,954
Hyde	442	80.22%	109	19.78%	333	60.44%	551
Jackson	609	68.50%	280	31.50%	329	37.01%	889
Jerauld	640	78.34%	177	21.66%	463	56.67%	817
Jones	397	88.22%	53	11.78%	344	76.44%	450
Kingsbury	1,780	75.46%	579	24.54%	1,201	50.91%	2,359
Lake	3,092	67.91%	1,461	32.09%	1,631	35.82%	4,553
Lawrence	7,982	69.08%	3,572	30.92%	4,410	38.17%	11,554
Lincoln	17,433	67.01%	8,584	32.99%	8,849	34.01%	26,017
Lyman	836	69.26%	371	30.74%	465	38.53%	1,207
Marshall	1,056	60.59%	687	39.41%	369	21.17%	1,743
McCook	1,752	74.33%	605	25.67%	1,147	48.66%	2,357
McPherson	906	85.96%	148	14.04%	758	71.92%	1,054
Meade	8,576	76.83%	2,586	23.17%	5,990	53.66%	11,162
Mellette	383	64.26%	213	35.74%	170	28.52%	596
Miner	651	72.90%	242	27.10%	409	45.80%	893
Minnehaha	40,546	58.88%	28,313	41.12%	12,233	17.77%	68,859
Moody	1,575	63.56%	903	36.44%	672	27.12%	2,478
Oglala Lakota	243	10.23%	2,132	89.77%	-1,889	-79.54%	2,375
Pennington	28,661	66.97%	14,138	33.03%	14,523	33.93%	42,799
Perkins	1,098	86.39%	173	13.61%	925	72.78%	1,271
Potter	871	84.07%	165	15.93%	706	68.15%	1,036
Roberts	1,956	58.79%	1,371	41.21%	585	17.58%	3,327
Sanborn	762	79.79%	193	20.21%	569	59.58%	955
Spink	1,837	72.29%	704	27.71%	1,133	44.59%	2,541
Stanley	1,082	77.51%	314	22.49%	768	55.01%	1,396
Sully	616	81.27%	142	18.73%	474	62.53%	758
Todd	429	22.87%	1,447	77.13%	-1,018	-54.26%	1,876
Tripp	1,760	81.56%	398	18.44%	1,362	63.11%	2,158
Turner	2,782	76.37%	861	23.63%	1,921	52.73%	3,643
Union	4,701	72.67%	1,768	27.33%	2,933	45.34%	6,469
Walworth	1,570	80.64%	377	19.36%	1,193	61.27%	1,947
Yankton	5,205	63.86%	2,946	36.14%	2,259	27.71%	8,151
Ziebach	318	50.56%	311	49.44%	7	1.11%	629
Totals	219,334	67.02%	107,916	32.98%	111,418	34.05%	327,250

Counties that flipped from Democratic to Republican

- Corson (largest city: McLaughlin)
- Roberts (largest city: Sisseton)
- Ziebach (largest city: Dupree)
