= A. C. Miller (politician) =

American politician (1870–1941)

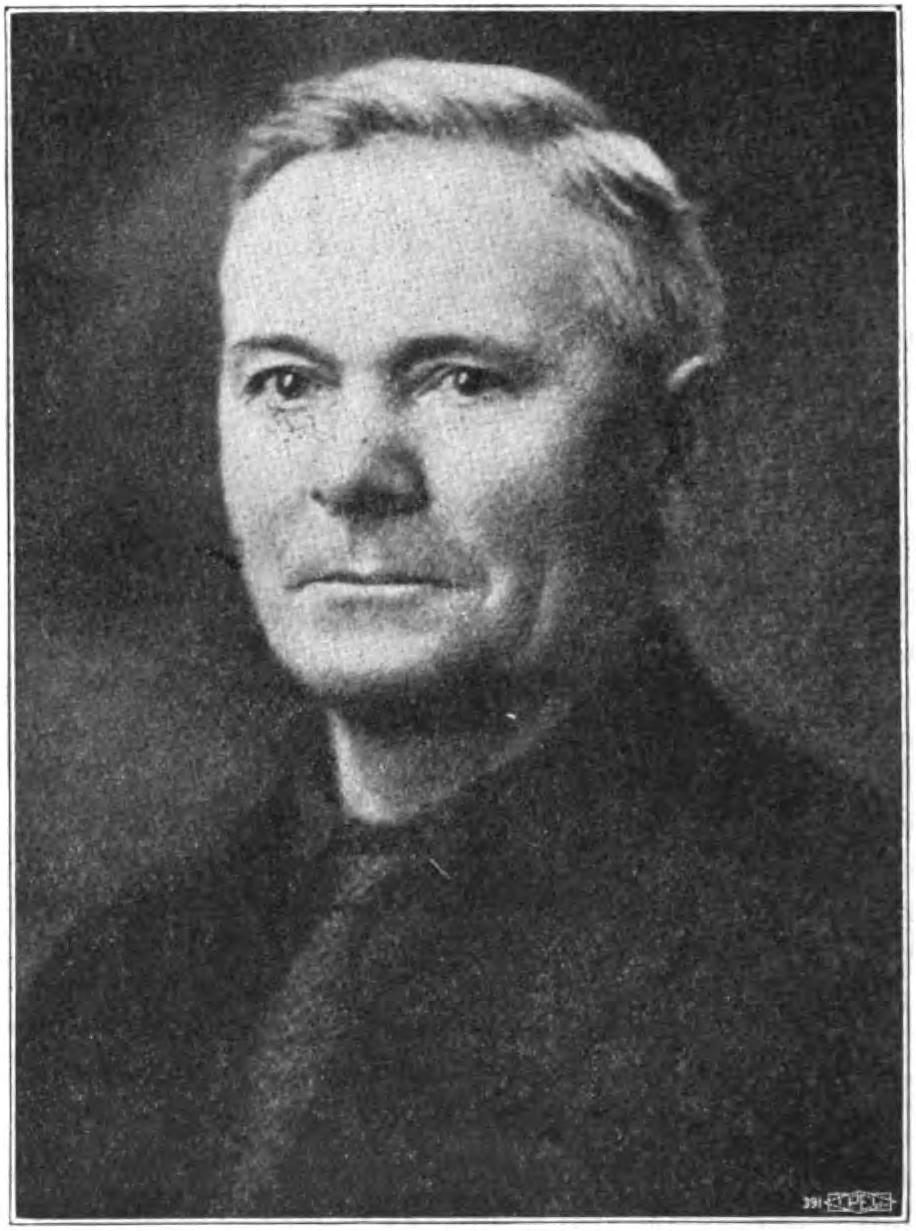
- Miller c. 1925

Member of the North Dakota House of Representatives from the 41st district
- In office January 6, 1925 – January 4, 1927
- Preceded by: Multi-member district
- Succeeded by: Multi-member district

Personal details
- Born: 1870 Missouri, U.S.
- Died: February 3, 1941 (aged 70) Williston, North Dakota, U.S.
- Party: Socialist (1902–1915); Nonpartisan League (after 1915); Workers (1923–1928); Farmer–Labor (after 1925); Communist League (1928–1930); Republican (after 1930)

A. C. Miller (1870 – February 3, 1941) was an American farmer and politician who served as a member of the North Dakota House of Representatives from 1925 to 1927, representing Williams and McKenzie counties as a member of the Nonpartisan League. He was also an open member of the Workers Party of America, making him one of the first communist legislators in the United States. (Note: Although the Communist Party's official magazine dubbed him "first Communist farmer to be elected to a legislative body in the United States," secret party member Charles E. Taylor was elected to the Montana Senate two years prior as a Farmer–Laborite.)

== Political career ==
At the time of his election, Miller was secretary of the Workers Party branch in Williston, a fact that was first reported by the Daily Worker and quickly picked up on by the local press. During his tenure, Miller introduced a resolution calling on the U.S. government to establish "full diplomatic and commercial relations" with the Soviet Union. He also sponsored legislation to ratify the Child Labor Amendment and institute a progressive income tax.

Although he was renominated on the newly-organized Farmer–Labor ballot line in 1926, he was defeated in the general election by a margin of seven to one. He tried again in 1928, 1930, 1936 and 1938, all unsuccessfully. He also ran for State Senate in 1932, during which he organized 2,000 farmers in Williams county to advocate for a plan to fix the price of wheat, a proposal that was supported by former lieutenant governor Usher L. Burdick.

== Communist Party politics ==
In 1927, shortly after the death of Communist Party Executive Secretary C. E. Ruthenberg, party leaders James P. Cannon and William Weinstone criticized the organization for not capitalizing on Miller's victory further, which they viewed as a missed opportunity to build up the party in North Dakota.

Miller was active in the Communist Party as late as August 1928. That December, he wrote a letter to The Militant (the official organ of the Trotskyist Communist League of America) in which he criticized the Communist Party for its unfair treatment of oppositional factions, which led to his expulsion from the party. He was in turn suspended from the Communist League in 1930 for running for State House on the Republican ticket.

== Works ==
=== Articles ===
- Beware of Little Business Men. Chicago: Daily Worker, 1924.
- N. D. Farmers for Communists. Chicago: Daily Worker, 1924.
- FARMER-LABOR CANDIDATES IN NORTH DAKOTA ANNOUNCE THEY ARE FOR COMMUNIST TICKET. With Andrew Omholt. Chicago: Daily Worker, 1924.
- KU KLUX KLAN TRIES TO DIVIDE WORKERS OF NORTH DAKOTA BY BOMBING AND RAIDING HOMES. Chicago: Daily Worker, 1925.
- EXPERT SPILLMAN 'SPILLS' ADVICE TO THE FARMERS. Chicago: Daily Worker, 1925.
- FROM THE FIRST COMMUNIST LEGISLATOR. New York: The Militant, 1928.
- A LETTER FROM A COMMUNIST FARMER. New York: The Militant, 1929.
