= Josh Haeder =

American businessman and politician

30th Treasurer of South Dakota
- Incumbent
- Assumed office January 5, 2019
- Governor: Kristi Noem; Larry Rhoden
- Preceded by: Rich Sattgast

Personal details
- Born: September 19, 1980 (age 46) Huron, South Dakota, U.S.
- Party: Republican
- Spouse: Amanda Haeder
- Children: 2
- Education: Capella University (BS); Point Park University (MA)

Joshua R. Haeder (born September 19, 1980) is an American businessman and politician from the state of South Dakota. He is the South Dakota State Treasurer.

== Early life and career ==
Haeder is from Huron, South Dakota. Haeder was the managing partner of Haeder Organization, LLC based in Huron, SD. Haeder Organization is a property management and real estate investment company. Haeder served 4 1/2 years as the Northeast Director for U.S. Senator Mike Rounds who is a member of the Banking Committee.

Haeder's experience includes time as the chief operating officer for a national, non-profit credit counseling agency that assists individuals and families considering bankruptcy. He also spent several years in business and agricultural banking management. Haeder's education includes a B.S. in Public Safety Management and a M.A. in Intelligence and Global Security.

== Political career ==
Haeder served as a regional director for U.S. Senator Mike Rounds.

Haeder ran for South Dakota State Treasurer in the 2018 election. He won the election with 62% of the vote, defeating Democrat Aaron Matson. Haeder ran for reelection in the 2022 election and defeated John Cunningham, 67% to 33%.

== Personal life ==
Haeder and his wife Amanda have two daughters, Maggie and Laikyn. In his spare time, Haeder is a public address announcer for sporting activities, enjoys practicing mixed martial arts, pheasant hunting, fishing and watching Minnesota Twins baseball.

Party political offices
Preceded by Rich Sattgast	Republican nominee for South Dakota State Treasurer; 2018, 2022	Succeeded by Melissa Hull
Political offices
Preceded by Rich Sattgast	Treasurer of South Dakota; 2019–present	Incumbent
