= Catherine Barranco =

Auditor-elect of South Dakota
- Assuming office January 2027
- Governor: Larry Rhoden
- Succeeding: Rich Sattgast

Personal details
- Born: Catherine O'Gorman
- Party: Republican
- Spouse: David Barranco (died 2026)
- Children: 2
- Education: Harvard University (BA); University of Oxford (MPhil)

Catherine O'Gorman Barranco is an American politician from South Dakota who is the Auditor-elect of South Dakota.

Born Catherine O'Gorman, she grew up in San Antonio. She earned a bachelor's in economics from Harvard College and a master's in economics from the University of Oxford.

Barranco was married to David Barranco, a member of the city council of Sioux Falls, South Dakota. In May 2025, David announced that he would run for South Dakota State Auditor in the 2026 election. However, he was diagnosed with colorectal cancer and suspended his campaign in May 2026. Catherine ran for state auditor in his place. Barranco and her husband had two sons. David died on July 6, 2026. Catherine won the November general election.

Political offices
Preceded by Rich Sattgast	Auditor of South Dakota; Taking office 2027	Elect
