= Vern Larson =

American politician

South Dakota Commissioner of School and Public Lands
- In office 2013–2015

South Dakota State Treasurer
- In office 2003–2011

South Dakota State Auditor
- In office 1979–2003

Personal details
- Born: October 25, 1948 (age 77) Vivian, South Dakota
- Party: Republican
- Education: Northern State University

Vernon L. Larson (born October 25, 1948, in Vivian, South Dakota) is an American politician and member of the Republican Party from the U.S. state of South Dakota.

Larson graduated from Vivian High School and received a degree from Northern State University, Aberdeen, South Dakota, in 1970.

Larson began his career in politics as a South Dakota field staff member for U.S. Senator James Abdnor.

He served as South Dakota State Auditor from 1979 to 2003. He is the longest-serving constitutional officer in South Dakota's history, and in 1998, he was unopposed for re-election. This was the first time in South Dakota that a constitutional officer had no opposition in the general election.

He was elected state treasurer in 2002 and assumed office on January 6, 2003. He was re-elected in 2006, without opposition, and subsequently left office in 2011, subject to term limits of two consecutive four-year terms.

In August 2013, Governor Dennis Daugaard appointed Larson to serve out the remaining term as South Dakota's Commissioner of School and Public Lands after Commissioner Jarrod Johnson resigned. His term ended in January 2015. He became the first person in South Dakota history to serve in three different statewide executive offices.

== Notes ==
Party political offices
Preceded by Alice Kundert	Republican nominee for State Auditor of South Dakota; 1978, 1982, 1986, 1990, 1994, 1998	Succeeded by Rich Sattgast
Preceded by Gary Drewes	Republican nominee for South Dakota State Treasurer; 2002, 2006	Succeeded by Rich Sattgast
