= Mound City, South Dakota =

- Town
- Location in Campbell County and the state of South Dakota
- Coordinates: 45°43′34″N 100°04′08″W
- Country: United States
- State: South Dakota
- County: Campbell

Area
  - Total: 0.13 sq mi (0.33 km^{2})
  - Land: 0.13 sq mi (0.33 km^{2})
  - Water: 0 sq mi (0.00 km^{2})
- Elevation: 1,723 ft (525 m)

Population (2020)
  - Total: 69
  - Density: 543.5/sq mi (209.86/km^{2})
- Time zone: UTC-6 (Central (CST))
  - Summer (DST): UTC-5 (CDT)
- ZIP code: 57646
- Area code: 605
- FIPS code: 46-44020
- GNIS feature ID: 1267485

Mound City is a town in and the county seat of Campbell County, South Dakota, United States. The population was 69 at the 2020 census.

== History ==
Mound City was so named on account of the Indian mounds near the original town site.

== Geography ==
According to the United States Census Bureau, the town has a total area of 0.13 square miles (0.34 km^{2}), all land.

== Demographics ==
Historical population
Census	Pop.	Note	%±
1930	165		—
1940	195		18.2%
1950	177		−9.2%
1960	144		−18.6%
1970	164		13.9%
1980	111		−32.3%
1990	89		−19.8%
2000	84		−5.6%
2010	71		−15.5%
2020	69		−2.8%
U.S. Decennial Census; 2012 Estimate

=== 2010 census ===
As of the census of 2010, there were 71 people, 40 households, and 21 families residing in the town. The population density was 546.2 inhabitants per square mile (210.9/km^{2}). There were 51 housing units at an average density of 392.3 per square mile (151.5/km^{2}). The racial makeup of the town was 98.6% White and 1.4% from two or more races.

There were 40 households, of which 10.0% had children under the age of 18 living with them, 45.0% were married couples living together, 7.5% had a male householder with no wife present, and 47.5% were non-families. 42.5% of all households were made up of individuals, and 25% had someone living alone who was 65 years of age or older. The average household size was 1.78 and the average family size was 2.24.

The median age in the town was 59.3 years. 5.6% of residents were under the age of 18; 5.6% were between the ages of 18 and 24; 12.6% were from 25 to 44; 32.4% were from 45 to 64; and 43.7% were 65 years of age or older. The gender makeup of the town was 54.9% male and 45.1% female.

=== 2000 census ===
As of the census of 2000, there were 84 people, 43 households, and 30 families residing in the town. The population density was 646.8 inhabitants per square mile (249.7/km^{2}). There were 54 housing units at an average density of 415.8 per square mile (160.5/km^{2}). The racial makeup of the town was 95.24% White, 3.57% Native American, and 1.19% from two or more races.

There were 43 households, out of which 9.3% had children under the age of 18 living with them, 58.1% were married couples living together, 4.7% had a female householder with no husband present, and 30.2% were non-families. 27.9% of all households were made up of individuals, and 16.3% had someone living alone who was 65 years of age or older. The average household size was 1.95 and the average family size was 2.33.

In the town, the population was spread out, with 9.5% under the age of 18, 2.4% from 18 to 24, 14.3% from 25 to 44, 34.5% from 45 to 64, and 39.3% who were 65 years of age or older. The median age was 60 years. For every 100 females, there were 95.3 males. For every 100 females age 18 and over, there were 100.0 males.

The median income for a household in the town was $24,375, and the median income for a family was $25,536. Males had a median income of $13,750 versus $23,125 for females. The per capita income for the town was $12,387. There were no families and 9.2% of the population living below the poverty line, including no under eighteens and 16.3% of those over 64.

== Notable people ==
- Claude Henry Allen, Minnesota politician and lawyer
- Alice Kundert, South Dakota politician

== See also ==
- List of towns in South Dakota
