= C. B. Collins (treasurer) =

Charles Burton Collins (October 8, 1861 – April 20, 1942) was an American politician who served as treasurer of South Dakota.

== Biography ==
Collins was born on October 8, 1861, in Rockbridge, Wisconsin. In 1887, he married Anna Millard Smith. In 1910, he and his family were living in Minneapolis. In 1920, he was manufacturing automobile tires in Los Angeles, where he died in 1942.

== Career ==
Collins served as Treasurer from 1903 to 1907. Additionally, he was a delegate to the 1900 Republican National Convention.
