= Otto Kundert =

American politician

Otto Kundert (July 26, 1888 – January 9, 1950) was an American politician.

From Java, South Dakota, Kundert served in the South Dakota House of Representatives from 1937 to 1942, from Campbell County, South Dakota, as a Republican. His daughter Alice Kundert and his son Gust Kundert also served in the South Dakota House of Representatives.
