= Alice Kundert =

American politician (1920–2013)

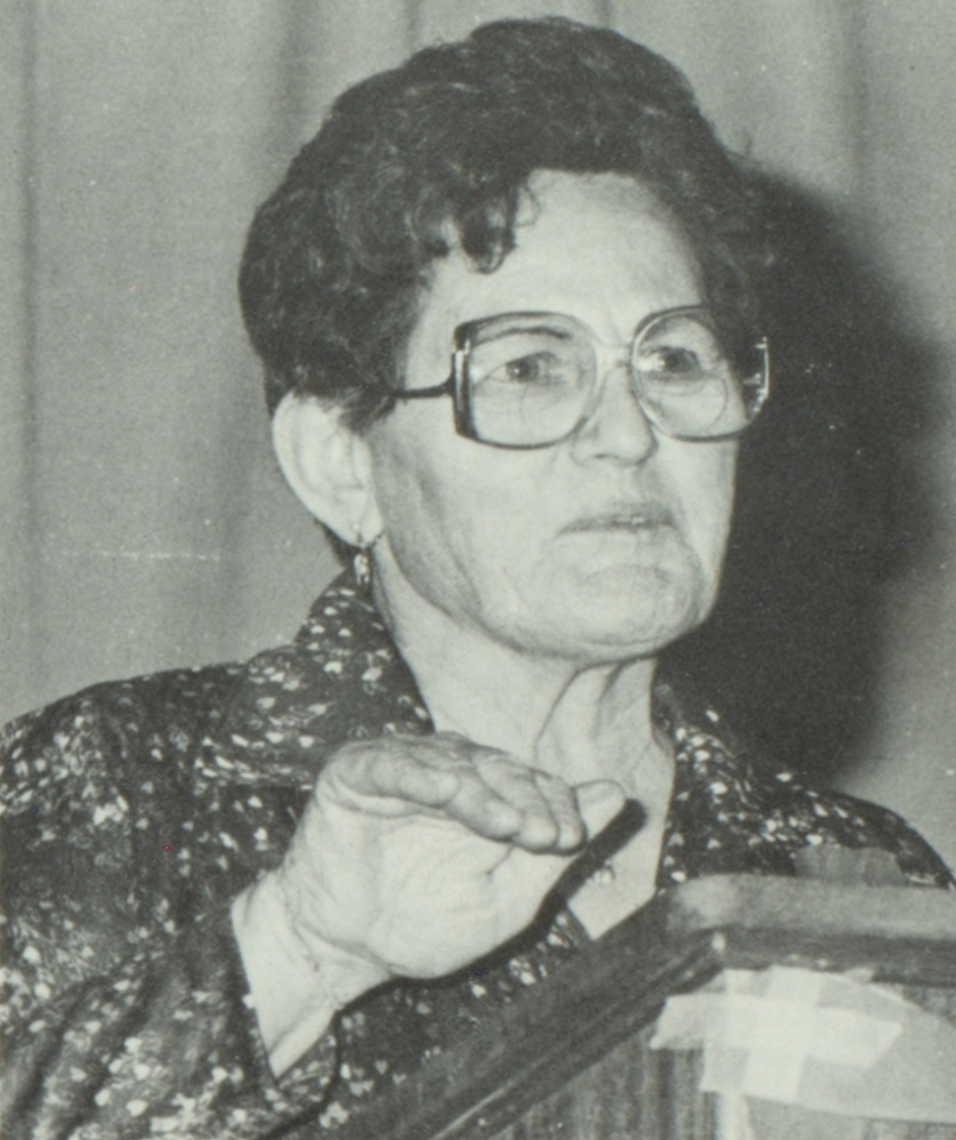
Kundert in 1981

Alice Kundert (July 23, 1920 – June 10, 2013) was an American politician. A Republican from South Dakota, she ascended to the top echelon of that state's politics.

From Mound City, South Dakota, she went to Northern State University and taught school. Kundert served as Auditor of the State of South Dakota from 1969 to 1978 and Secretary of State of South Dakota from 1979 to 1986.

In 1986, Kundert entered the race for the Republican nomination for governor. Her entry into the race marked only the second time that a woman had run for the GOP nomination. Facing what has been described as a "loaded field," she came in fourth, winning just 13.8 percent of the vote.

After the loss in the gubernatorial primary, Kundert served in the South Dakota House of Representatives 1991–1994. She also served in various offices in Campbell County, South Dakota. Her father Otto Kundert and her brother Gust Kundert also served in the South Dakota House of Representatives.

== Notes ==
Party political offices
Preceded by Lloyd Jorgenson	Republican nominee for State Auditor of South Dakota; 1968, 1970, 1972, 1974	Succeeded by Vern Larson
Preceded by Joyze Hazeltine	Republican nominee for Secretary of State of South Dakota; 1978, 1982	Succeeded by Joyze Hazeltine
