= South Dakota State Treasurer =

State Treasurer of South Dakota
- Great Seal of South Dakota

- Flag of South Dakota
- Incumbent; Josh Haeder since January 5, 2019
- Government of South Dakota
- Seat: State Capitol, Pierre, South Dakota
- Term length: Four years, renewable once
- Constituting instrument: Constitution of South Dakota
- Precursor: Treasurer of Dakota Territory
- Inaugural holder: Wilbur F. Smith
- Formation: 1889
- Deputy: Deputy Treasurer of South Dakota
- Salary: $97,185 (2022)
- Website: sdtreasurer.gov

The state treasurer of South Dakota is a constitutional officer in the executive branch of the government of the U.S. state of South Dakota. The incumbent treasurer, Josh Haeder, is the 33rd individual to have held the office since statehood.

== List of treasurers ==
State treasurers of South Dakota
No.	Treasurer	Term in office	Party	Election
1	Wilbur F. Smith	1889 – 1891	Republican	1888
2	W. W. Taylor	1891 – 1895	Republican	1890
2	W. W. Taylor	1891 – 1895	Republican	1892
3	Kirk G. Phillips	1895 – 1899	Republican	1894
3	Kirk G. Phillips	1895 – 1899	Republican	1896
4	John Schamber	1899 – 1903	Republican	1898
4	John Schamber	1899 – 1903	Republican	1900
5	C. B. Collins	1903 – 1907	Republican	1902
5	C. B. Collins	1903 – 1907	Republican	1904
6	C. H. Cassill	1907 – 1909	Republican	1906
7	George G. Johnson	1909 – 1913	Republican	1908
7	George G. Johnson	1909 – 1913	Republican	1910
8	Adolph W. Ewert	1913 – 1917	Republican	1912
8	Adolph W. Ewert	1913 – 1917	Republican	1914
9	G. H. Helgerson	1917 – 1921	Republican	1916
9	G. H. Helgerson	1917 – 1921	Republican	1918
10	W. S. O'Brien	1921 – 1923	Republican	1920
11	James L. Driscoll	1923 – 1927	Republican	1922
11	James L. Driscoll	1923 – 1927	Republican	1924
12	A. J. Moodie	1927 – 1931	Republican	1926
12	A. J. Moodie	1927 – 1931	Republican	1928
13	A. C. Goodhope	1931 – 1933	Republican	1930
14	Frank G. Siewert	1933 – 1937	Democratic	1932
14	Frank G. Siewert	1933 – 1937	Democratic	1934
15	W. H. Hinselman	1937 – 1939	Democratic	1936
16	W. G. Douglas	1939 – August 20, 1942 (resigned)	Republican	1938
16	W. G. Douglas	1939 – August 20, 1942 (resigned)	Republican	1940
17	John N. Thompson	1942 – 1943	Republican	—N/a
18	E. V. Youngquist	1943 – July 8, 1945 (died in office)	Republican	1942
18	E. V. Youngquist	1943 – July 8, 1945 (died in office)	Republican	1944
19	Hazel Dean	1945 – 1947	Republican	—N/a
20	C. E. Buehler	1947 – 1951	Republican	1946
20	C. E. Buehler	1947 – 1951	Republican	1948
21	Theodore Mehlhaf	1951 – 1955	Republican	1950
21	Theodore Mehlhaf	1951 – 1955	Republican	1952
22	Ed T. Elkins	1955 – 1959	Republican	1954
22	Ed T. Elkins	1955 – 1959	Republican	1956
23	Al Hamre	1959 – 1963	Republican	1958
23	Al Hamre	1959 – 1963	Republican	1960
24	Lloyd Jorgenson	1963 – 1967	Republican	1962
24	Lloyd Jorgenson	1963 – 1967	Republican	1964
25	Al Hamre	1967 – 1969	Republican	1966
26	Neal Strand	1969 – 1973	Republican	1968
26	Neal Strand	1969 – 1973	Republican	1970
27	David Volk	1973 – July 31, 1990 (resigned)	Republican	1972
27	David Volk	1973 – July 31, 1990 (resigned)	Republican	1974
27	David Volk	1973 – July 31, 1990 (resigned)	Republican	1978
27	David Volk	1973 – July 31, 1990 (resigned)	Republican	1982
27	David Volk	1973 – July 31, 1990 (resigned)	Republican	1986
28	Janis Y. Kelley	1990 – 1991	Republican	—N/a
29	G. Homer Harding	1991 – 1995	Republican	1990
30	Richard D. Butler	1995 – 2003 (term-limited)	Democratic	1994
30	Richard D. Butler	1995 – 2003 (term-limited)	Democratic	1998
31	Vern Larson	2003 – 2011 (term-limited)	Republican	2002
31	Vern Larson	2003 – 2011 (term-limited)	Republican	2006
32	Rich Sattgast	2011 – January 5, 2019 (term-limited)	Republican	2010
32	Rich Sattgast	2011 – January 5, 2019 (term-limited)	Republican	2014
33	Josh Haeder	January 5, 2019 – Incumbent	Republican	2018
33	Josh Haeder	January 5, 2019 – Incumbent	Republican	2022
