= Steve Barnett (politician) =

American Republican politician

Secretary of State of South Dakota
- In office January 5, 2019 – December 5, 2022
- Governor: Kristi Noem
- Preceded by: Shantel Krebs
- Succeeded by: Monae Johnson

Auditor of South Dakota
- In office January 8, 2011 – January 5, 2019
- Governor: Dennis Daugaard
- Preceded by: Rich Sattgast
- Succeeded by: Rich Sattgast

Personal details
- Born: September 8, 1978 (age 47) Aberdeen, South Dakota, U.S.
- Party: Republican
- Relatives: Joseph H. Barnett (grandfather)
- Education: University of South Dakota (BA); University of Sioux Falls (MBA)

Steven Joseph Barnett (born September 8, 1978) is an American Republican politician who served as the Secretary of State of South Dakota from 2019 to 2022. He previously served as state auditor of South Dakota from 2011 to 2019.

== Biography ==
Barnett graduated from Roncalli High School in Aberdeen, South Dakota, from where he is a native. He is the grandson of Joseph H. Barnett, who served as Speaker of the South Dakota House of Representatives in 1975 and 1976.

Barnett graduated with a bachelor's degree from the University of South Dakota and with a master's degree from the University of Sioux Falls. He served as a Constituent Services Representative for Senator John Thune from 2005 until 2010.

Barnett was first elected auditor in 2010, defeating Democratic state senator Julie Bartling with 61% of the vote. He was reelected in 2014, defeating Libertarian Kurt Evans with 80% of the vote.

Barnett was elected Secretary of State of South Dakota in 2018. Barnett ran for a second term in 2022, but lost the nomination at a party convention to Monae Johnson. Barnett resigned from office early to return to the private sector.

== Personal life ==
Barnett and his wife, Nicole, have 3 children: Emma, Henry, and William.

Party political offices
Preceded by Rich Sattgast	Republican nominee for Auditor of South Dakota; 2010, 2014	Succeeded by Rich Sattgast
Preceded by Shantel Krebs	Republican nominee for Secretary of State of South Dakota; 2018	Succeeded by Monae Johnson
Political offices
Preceded by Rich Sattgast	Auditor of South Dakota; 2011–2019	Succeeded by Rich Sattgast
Preceded by Shantel Krebs	Secretary of State of South Dakota; 2019–2022	Succeeded by Monae Johnson
