= Rich Sattgast =

American politician

26th and 28th Auditor of South Dakota
- Incumbent
- Assumed office January 5, 2019
- Governor: Kristi Noem; Larry Rhoden
- Preceded by: Steve Barnett
- In office January 7, 2003 – January 8, 2011
- Governor: Mike Rounds
- Preceded by: Vern Larson
- Succeeded by: Steve Barnett

29th Treasurer of South Dakota
- In office January 8, 2011 – January 5, 2019
- Governor: Dennis Daugaard
- Preceded by: Vern Larson
- Succeeded by: Josh Haeder

Personal details
- Born: Silver City, New Mexico, U.S.
- Party: Republican
- Education: Black Hills State University (BA); New Mexico Highlands University (MA)

Military service
- Allegiance: United States
- Branch/service: United States Army
- Unit: South Dakota National Guard

Richard L. Sattgast is an American politician who serves as the state auditor of South Dakota for the second time having served two terms previously (2003–2011). He formerly served as state treasurer (2011–2019).

== Early life and education ==
Sattgast was born in Silver City, New Mexico. His parents moved back to South Dakota in 1966 where his father taught at Dakota State College, then transferred to Black Hills State. Rich graduated from Spearfish High School. He received a bachelor's degree from Black Hills State University and a master's degree from New Mexico Highlands University. Sattgast also served in the United States Army. Sattgast served on active duty in Berlin from 1983-1985, Ft. Hood from 1985-1986, Desert Storm from 1991-1992, and in the South Dakota National Guard until 2001.

== Career ==
Sattgast was elected state auditor in 2002, defeating Democrat Dick Butler with 52% of the vote. He was reelected unopposed in 2006. In 2010, Sattgast ran for state treasurer and won, defeating Democrat Tom Katus with 65% of the vote. He was reelected as treasurer in 2014, defeating Democrat Denny Pierson and Libertarian Ken Santema with 61% of the vote.

== Personal life ==
Sattgast and his wife, Penny, have three children.

Party political offices
Preceded by Vern Larson	Republican nominee for Auditor of South Dakota; 2002, 2006	Succeeded by Steve Barnett
Preceded by Vern Larson	Republican nominee for Treasurer of South Dakota; 2010, 2014	Succeeded by Josh Haeder
Preceded by Steve Barnett	Republican nominee for Auditor of South Dakota; 2018, 2022	Most recent
Political offices
Preceded by Vern Larson	Auditor of South Dakota; 2003–2011	Succeeded by Steve Barnett
Preceded by Vern Larson	Treasurer of South Dakota; 2011–2019	Succeeded by Josh Haeder
Preceded by Steve Barnett	Auditor of South Dakota; 2019–present	Incumbent
