= State Auditor of South Dakota =

Constitutional officer of South Dakota

- Incumbent; Rich Sattgast since January 7, 2019
- Style: Mister or Madam Auditor (informal); The Honorable (formal)
- Member of: State Board of Finance, among others
- Seat: South Dakota State Capitol; Pierre, South Dakota
- Appointer: General election
- Term length: Four years, not more than two terms consecutively
- Constituting instrument: Article IV, South Dakota Constitution
- Inaugural holder: L.C. Taylor
- Formation: May 11, 1858 (168 years ago)
- Salary: $93,046
- Website: Official website

The state auditor of South Dakota is a constitutional officer in the executive branch of the U.S. state of South Dakota. Twenty-seven individuals have held the office of state auditor since statehood. The incumbent is Rich Sattgast, a Republican.

== Powers and duties ==
The state auditor is the elected watchdog of state government, scrutinizing and approving the disbursement of public funds paid out of the state treasury. The state auditor exercises this constitutional authority by preauditing all vouchers for claims against the state, issuing warrants on the state treasurer in payment of claims approved, recording financial transactions, reconciling fund balances, and submitting annual reports on the financial condition of state funds and appropriations to the governor, legislature, and various state agencies.

The state auditor also administers payroll to state employees. This activity entails collecting payroll and withheld federal income taxes from personnel, coordinating deposits with the IRS and Social Security Administration, and filing W-2s. Over the course of the payroll cycle, the state auditor's office audits payroll data maintained by state agencies and over 700 political subdivisions, including counties, cities, school districts, townships, and water districts.

In South Dakota, the state auditor does not postaudit state agencies or local governments. Financial, compliance, and performance audits of state agencies and local governments are instead the responsibility of the Department of Legislative Audit, which is led by an auditor general appointed by the legislature. Likewise, the state auditor does not maintain the state accounting system, design and enforce internal controls, or prepare the state's financial statements. Rather, these functions rest with the Bureau of Finance and Management, a division of the Department of Executive Management that also prepares and manages the state budget. Both the bureau and department are subject to the governor's direction and supervision. In this sense, the state auditor's office performs a function similar to that carried out by accounts payable departments in the private sector.
