= Delmont =

Delmont may refer to:

== Places in the United States ==
- Delmont, New Jersey, an unincorporated community and census-designated place
- Delmont, Ohio, an unincorporated community
- Delmont, Pennsylvania, a borough
- Delmont, South Dakota, a city
- Camp Delmont, one of three camps that make up the Boy Scout Musser Scout Reservation, Pennsylvania

== People ==
- Delmont (surname)
- Delmont Gullery (1905–1982), New Zealand rowing coxswain
- Delmont Fitz Hinds (1880–?), West Indian cricketer
- Delmont Moffitt (1911–2001), American politician

== Other uses ==
- Delmont Public School, Delmont, South Dakota, on the National Register of Historic Places
- Delmont 88, a model of the Oldsmobile 88 car produced for two years, beginning 1967

== See also ==
- Del Monte (disambiguation)
