= National Register of Historic Places listings in Douglas County, South Dakota =

Location of Douglas County in South Dakota

This is a list of the National Register of Historic Places listings in Douglas County, South Dakota.

This is intended to be a complete list of the properties and districts on the National Register of Historic Places in Douglas County, South Dakota, United States. The locations of National Register properties and districts for which the latitude and longitude coordinates are included below, may be seen in a map.

There are 8 properties and districts listed on the National Register in the county.

This National Park Service list is complete through NPS recent listings posted March 14, 2025.

== Current listings ==
	Name on the Register	Image	Date listed	Location	City or town	Description
1	Armour Historic District	Armour Historic District	January 30, 1978 (#78002548)	Main St. between 3rd and 7th Sts. 43°19′14″N 98°21′04″W	Armour	
2	Delmont Public School	Delmont Public School	June 3, 1994 (#94000560)	205 W. 3rd 43°15′54″N 98°09′51″W	Delmont	
3	Delmont Pumphouse	Delmont Pumphouse	May 8, 1998 (#98000446)	W. Main St. 43°16′03″N 98°09′49″W	Delmont	
4	Delmont State Bank	Delmont State Bank	February 19, 2008 (#08000044)	104 W. Main St. 43°16′11″N 98°09′46″W	Delmont	
5	Douglas County Courthouse and Auditor's Office	Douglas County Courthouse and Auditor's Office	March 21, 1978 (#78002549)	U.S. Route 281; 43°18′48″N 98°20′31″W	Armour	
6	Thomas Lenehan House	Thomas Lenehan House	February 8, 1988 (#88000003)	Main St. 43°16′04″N 98°09′50″W	Delmont	
7	Slettebak Groceries, Hardware and Opera House		February 23, 1984 (#84003278)	Address restricted	Armour	
8	Stevens Opera Block	Stevens Opera Block	December 20, 1988 (#88002838)	Main St. 43°16′04″N 98°09′44″W	Delmont	

== See also ==
- List of National Historic Landmarks in South Dakota
- National Register of Historic Places listings in South Dakota
