= Armour Historic District =

Historic district in South Dakota, United States

- U.S. National Register of Historic Places
- U.S. Historic district
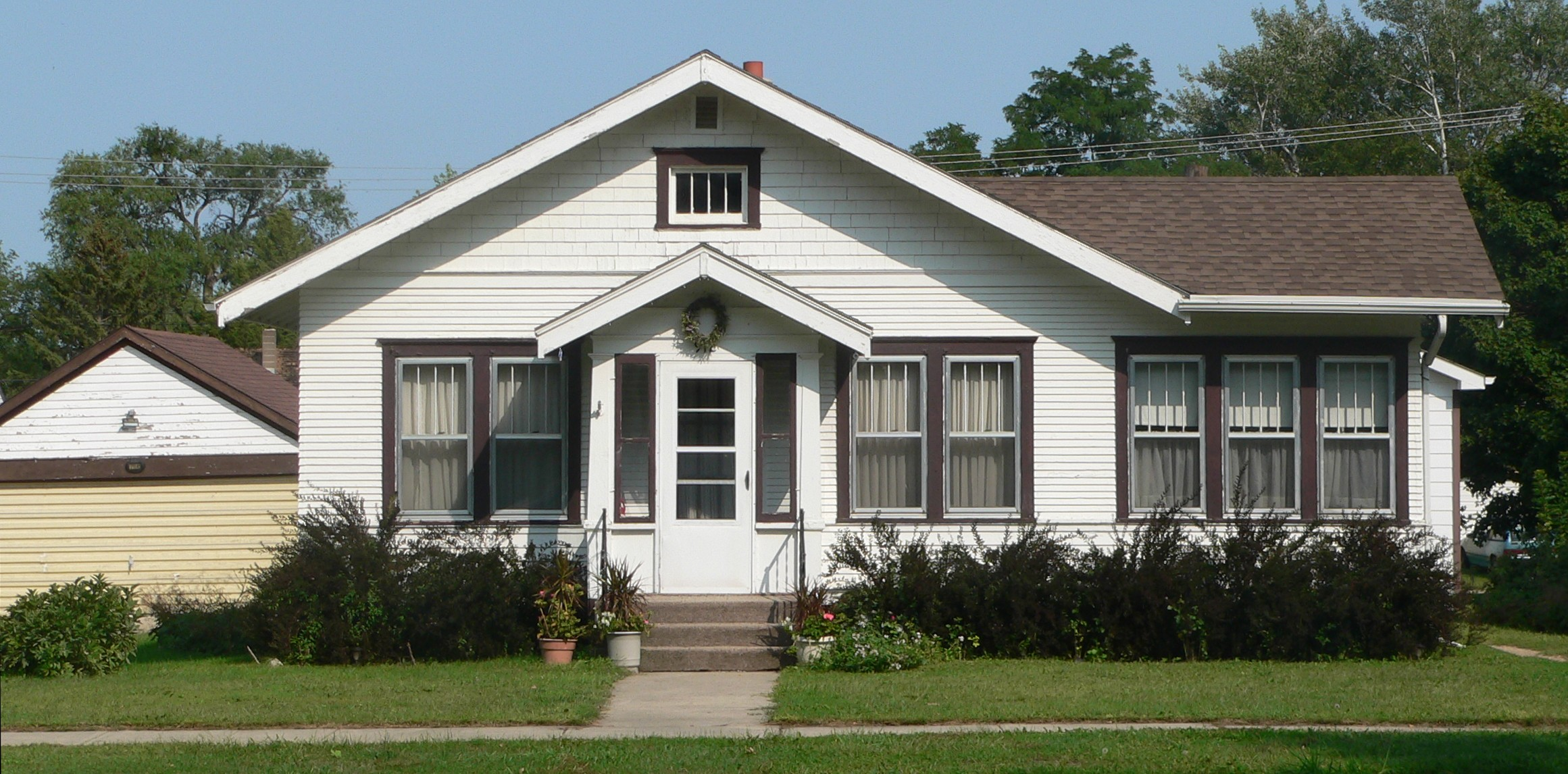
- Emma Taylor House, built 1910

- Location within South Dakota Location within the United States
- Location: Main St. between 3rd and 7th Sts., Armour, South Dakota
- Area: 35 acres (14 ha)
- Architectural style: Classical Revival, Queen Anne, Bungaloid;Prairie
- NRHP reference No.: 78002548
- Added to NRHP: January 30, 1978

The Armour Historic District encompasses a predominantly residential area of Armour, the county seat of Douglas County, South Dakota. The district spans a four-block stretch of Main Street, from Third to Seventh Streets, and includes twenty primary buildings. Among them, only the Armour Carnegie Library—designed by William Steele and constructed in 1915—is non-residential. Most houses were built between 1895 and 1918, representing an architecturally diverse collection of largely vernacular structures, featuring modest Queen Anne and Colonial or Classical Revival elements. One of the finest houses in the district is the William Moore House at Main and Fourth, built in 1904, with a porch supported by fluted columns.

The district was listed on the National Register of Historic Places in 1978.

== See also ==
- National Register of Historic Places listings in Douglas County, South Dakota
