= Terminator (solar) =

Line dividing day and night on a celestial body

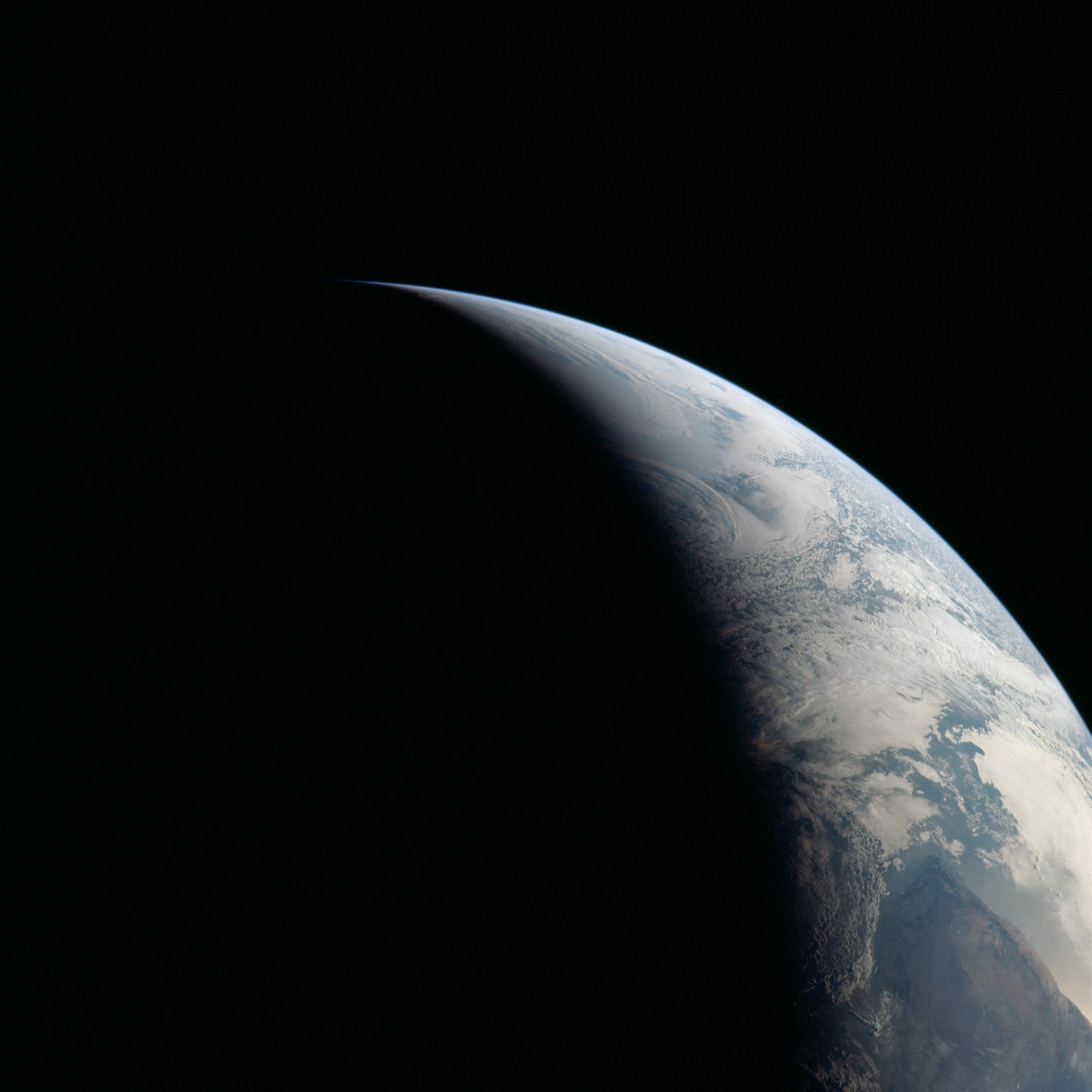
Earth's terminator as seen from space

A terminator or twilight zone is a moving line that divides the daylit side and the dark night side of a planetary body. The terminator is defined as the locus of points on a planet or moon where the line through the center of its parent star is tangent. An observer on the terminator of such an orbiting body with an atmosphere would experience twilight due to light scattering by particles in the gaseous layer.

== Earth's terminator ==
On Earth, the terminator is a circle that divides the Earth approximately in half. The terminator passes through any point on Earth's surface twice a day, at sunrise and at sunset, apart from polar regions where this only occurs when the point is not experiencing midnight sun or polar night. The circle separates the portion of Earth experiencing daylight from that experiencing darkness (night). While a little over one half of Earth is illuminated at any point in time (with exceptions during eclipses), the terminator path varies by time of day due to Earth's rotation on its axis. The terminator path also varies by time of year due to Earth's orbital revolution around the Sun; thus, the plane of the terminator is nearly parallel to planes created by lines of longitude during the equinoxes, and its maximum angle is approximately 23.5° to the pole during the solstices.

=== Surface transit speed ===
Video of the Earth from the ISS as it approaches the terminator.

At the equator, under flat conditions (without obstructions like mountains or at a height above any such obstructions), the terminator moves at approximately 463 metres per second (1,040 mph). This speed can appear to increase when near obstructions, such as the height of a mountain, as the shadow of the obstruction will be cast over the ground in advance of the terminator along a flat landscape. The speed of the terminator decreases as it approaches the poles, where it can reach a speed of zero (full-day sunlight or darkness).

Supersonic aircraft are the only aircraft able to overtake the maximum speed of the terminator at the equator. However, slower vehicles can overtake the terminator at higher latitudes, and it is possible to walk faster than the terminator at the poles, near to the equinoxes. The visual effect is that of seeing the sun rise in the west, or set in the east.

=== Grey-line radio propagation ===
Strength of radio propagation changes between day- and night-side of the ionosphere. This is primarily because the D layer, which absorbs high frequency signals, disappears rapidly on the dark side of the terminator, whereas the E and F layers above the D layer take longer to form. This time-difference puts the ionosphere into a unique intermediate state along the terminator, called the "grey line".

Amateur radio operators take advantage of conditions along the terminator to perform long-distance communications. Called "gray-line" or "grey-line" propagation, this signal path is a type of skywave propagation. Under good conditions, radio waves can travel along the terminator to antipodal points.

== Gallery ==
A seasonal animation of the terminator line at sunset over central Europe.

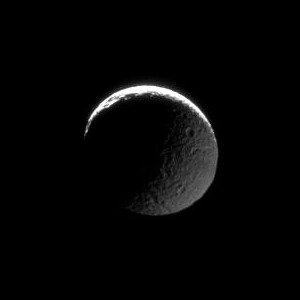
The transition from light to dark takes place on two fronts in this image of Mimas.

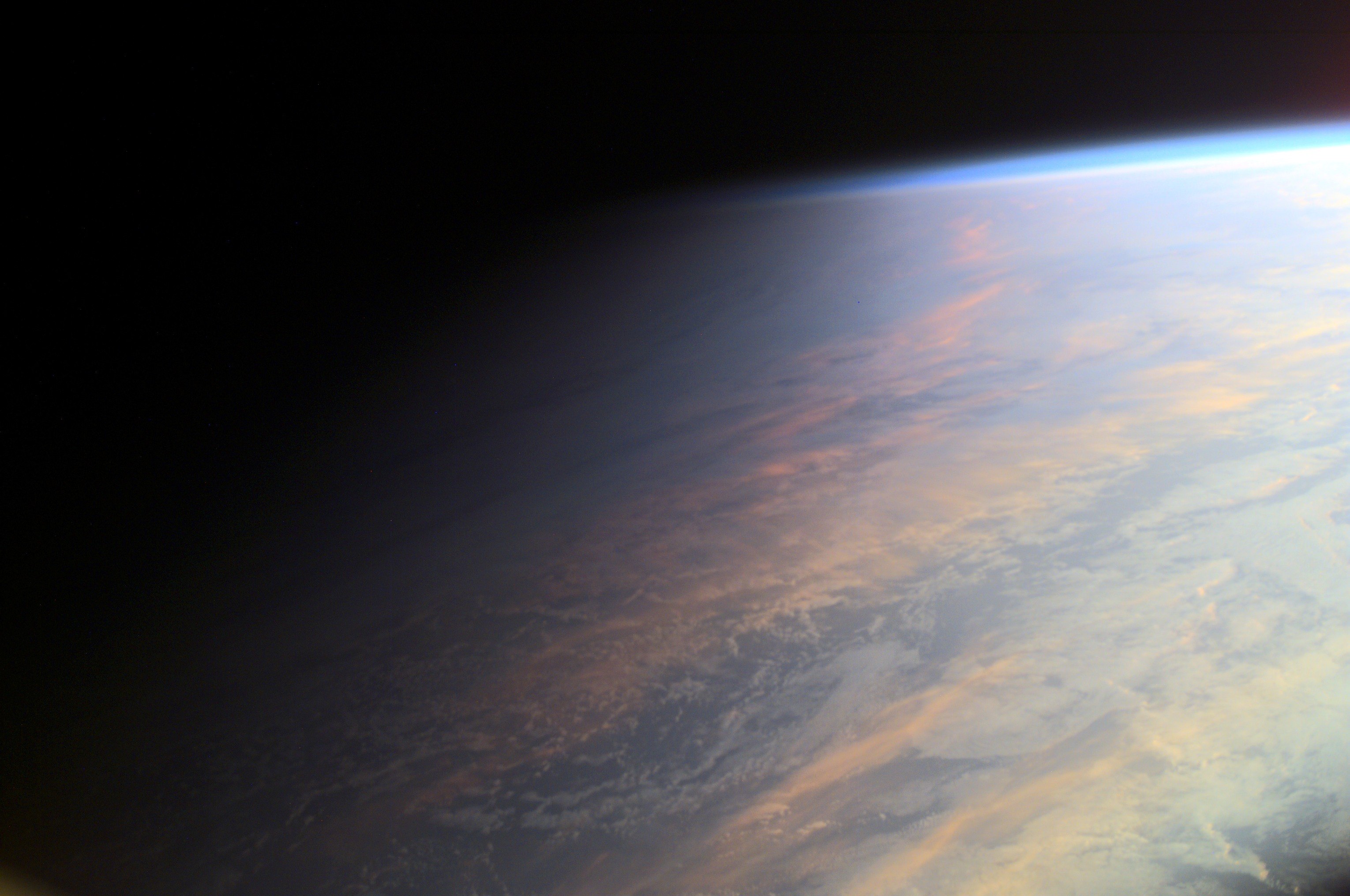
A photograph of part of the terminator crossing the surface of the Earth, as seen from the ISS. The terminator is diffuse and shows the gradual transition to darkness that is experienced as twilight on the surface.

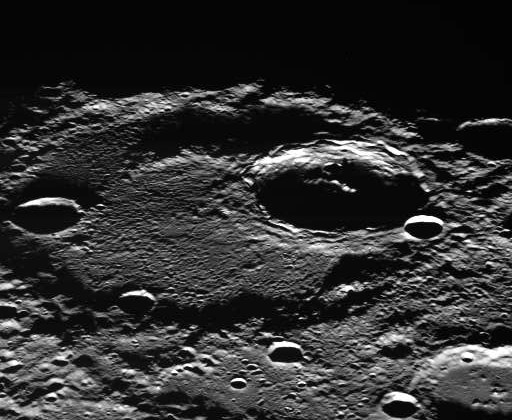
Boznańska crater near the terminator on Mercury

== Lunar terminator ==
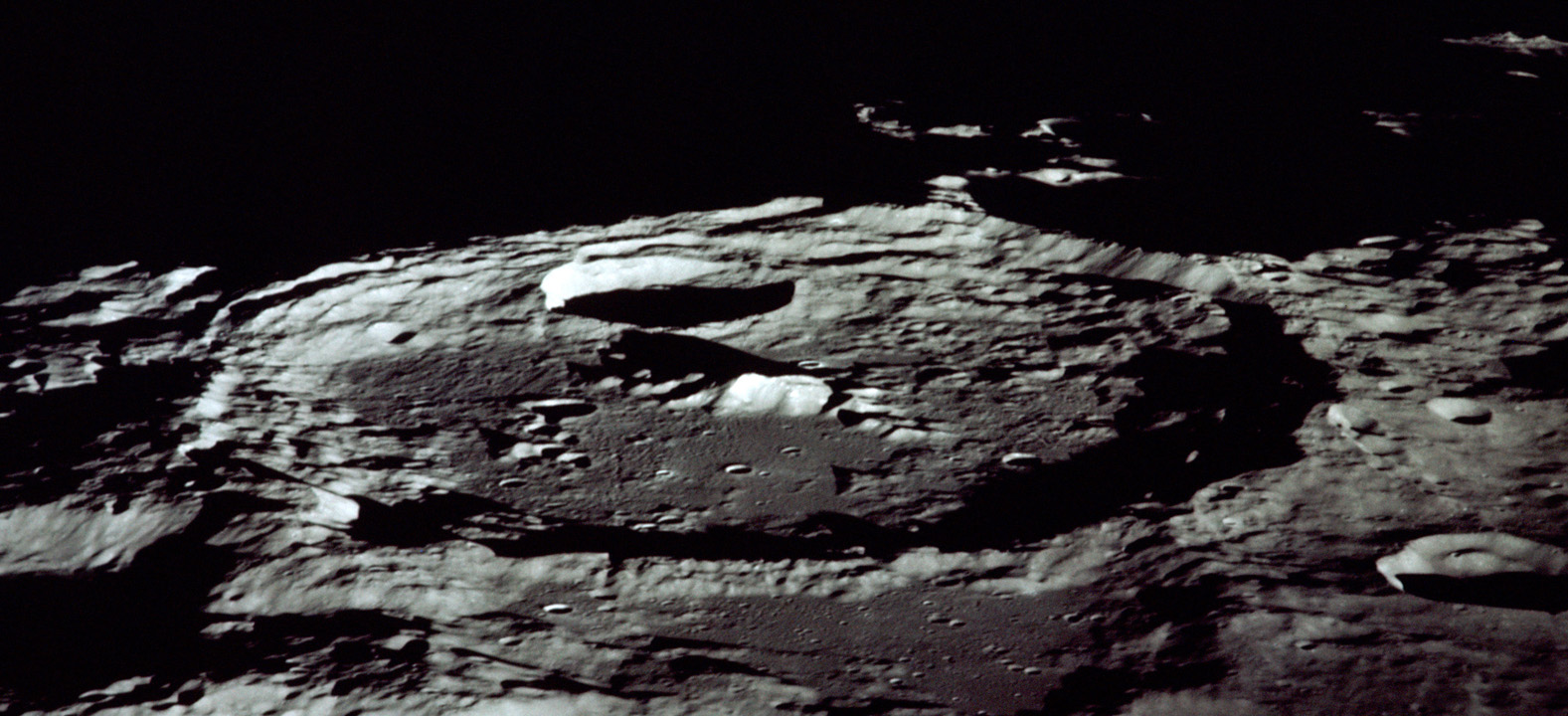
An oblique view of the large lunar crater Keeler at the terminator (from Apollo 13)

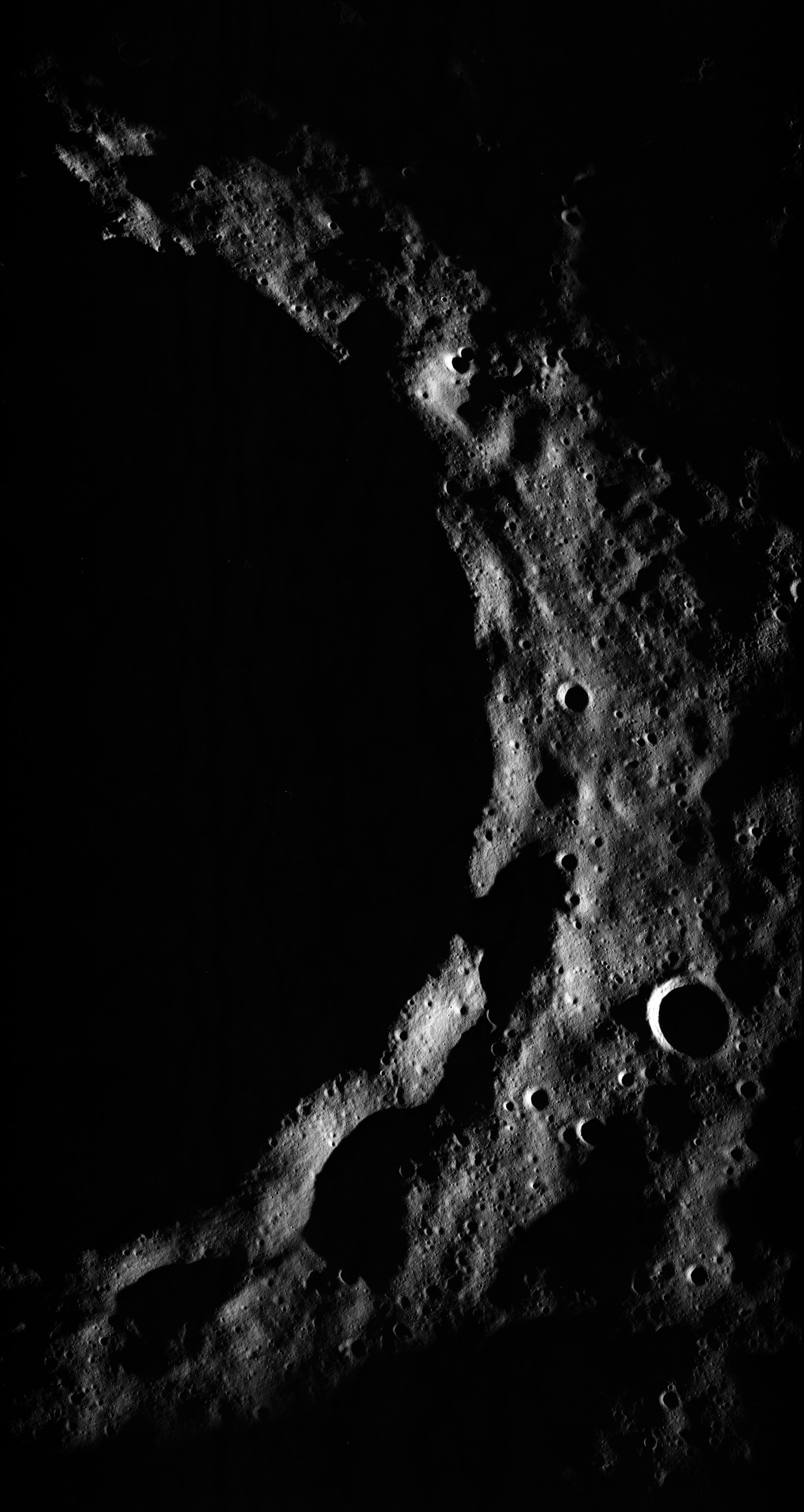
The east side of Timocharis crater while at the terminator (from Apollo 15)

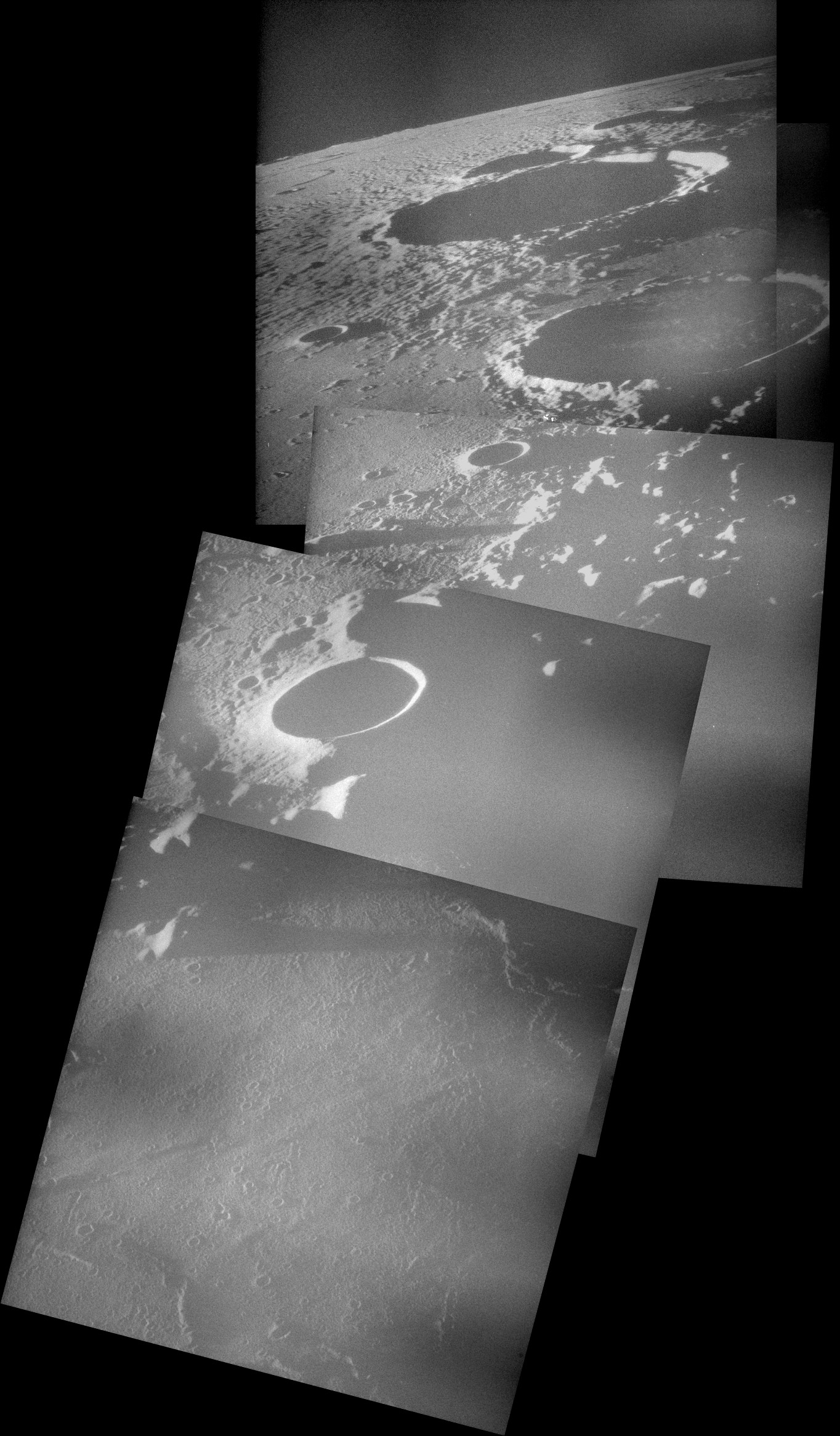
Mosaic of Apollo 16 photos along the terminator showing Darney, Lubiniezky, and Bullialdus craters

The lunar terminator is the division between the illuminated and dark hemispheres of the Moon. It is the lunar equivalent of the division between night and day on the Earth spheroid, although the Moon's much lower rate of rotation means it takes longer for it to pass across the surface. At the equator, it moves at 15.4 kilometres per hour (9.6 mph), as fast as an athletic human can run on earth. From an observer on the northern hemisphere of Earth, the lunar terminator appears to move from right to left (lunar east to lunar west), with the reverse being true for an observer on the southern hemisphere of Earth. This fact is useful in determining which of the moon's phases is waxing or waning.

Due to the angle at which sunlight strikes this portion of the Moon, shadows cast by craters and other geological features are elongated, thereby making such features more apparent to the observer. This phenomenon is similar to the lengthening of shadows on Earth when the Sun is low in the sky. For this reason, much lunar photographic study centers on the illuminated area near the lunar terminator, and the resulting shadows provide accurate descriptions of the lunar terrain.

=== Lunar terminator illusion ===
The lunar terminator (or tilt) illusion is an optical illusion arising from the expectation of an observer on Earth that the direction of sunlight illuminating the Moon (i.e. a line perpendicular to the terminator) should correspond with the position of the Sun, but does not appear to do so. The illusion results from misinterpreting the arrangement of objects in the sky according to intuition based on planar geometry.

== Scientific significance ==
Examination of a terminator can yield information about the surface of a planetary body; for example, the presence of an atmosphere can create a fuzzier terminator. As the particles within an atmosphere are at a higher elevation, the light source can remain visible even after it has set at ground level. These particles scatter the light, reflecting some of it to the ground. Hence, the sky can remain illuminated even after the sun has set. Images showing a planetary terminator can be used to map topography: the position of the tip of a mountain behind the terminator line is measured when the Sun still or already illuminates it while the base of the mountain remains in shadow.

Low Earth orbit satellites take advantage of the fact that certain polar orbits set near the terminator do not suffer from eclipse, therefore their solar cells are continuously lit by sunlight. Such orbits are called dawn-dusk orbits, a type of Sun-synchronous orbit. This prolongs the operational life of a LEO satellite, as onboard battery life is prolonged. It also enables specific experiments that require minimum interference from the Sun, as the designers can opt to install the relevant sensors on the dark side of the satellite.

== See also ==
- Terminator orbit
- Subsolar point
- Ground track
- Colongitude
- Lunar grazing occultation
- Lunar phase
