= Delmotte =

Delmotte is a surname. Notable people with the surname include:

- Christophe Delmotte (born 1969), Franco-Belgian footballer
- Fernand Delmotte (1920–1998), Belgian politician
- Hans Delmotte (1917–1945), Belgian SS Officer
- Henri Delmotte (1822–1884), Belgian playwright, librettist and novelist
- Gabriel Delmotte (1876–1950), French astronomer
- Roger Delmotte (born 1925), French classical trumpeter
- Nicolas Delmotte (born 1978), French show jumper
- Valerie Masson-Delmotte, French climate scientist

== See also ==
- Delmotte (crater)
- Del Monte (disambiguation)
