= Harrison, South Dakota =

- Census-designated place
- Location in Douglas County and the state of South Dakota
- Coordinates: 43°25′52″N 98°31′36″W
- Country: United States
- State: South Dakota
- Counties: Douglas

Area
  - Total: 0.11 sq mi (0.28 km^{2})
  - Land: 0.11 sq mi (0.28 km^{2})
  - Water: 0 sq mi (0.00 km^{2})
- Elevation: 1,595 ft (486 m)

Population (2020)
  - Total: 55
  - Density: 510.0/sq mi (196.92/km^{2})
- Time zone: UTC-6 (Central (CST))
  - Summer (DST): UTC-5 (CDT)
- ZIP code: 57344
- Area code: 605
- FIPS code: 46-27300
- GNIS feature ID: 2393041

Harrison is an unincorporated community and census-designated place (CDP) in Douglas County, South Dakota, United States. The population was 55 at the 2020 census.

The community was named for Benjamin Harrison, a United States senator from Indiana, and afterward President of the United States.

== Geography ==
Harrison is located in western Douglas County 6 miles (10 km) west of Corsica and 16 miles (26 km) northwest of Armour, the Douglas County seat.

According to the United States Census Bureau, the CDP has a total area of 0.11 square miles (0.28 km^{2}), all land.

== Demographics ==
Historical population
Census	Pop.	Note	%±
2020	55		—
U.S. Decennial Census

As of the census of 2000, there were 51 people, 26 households, and 17 families residing in the CDP. The population density was 458.5 inhabitants per square mile (177.0/km^{2}). There were 33 housing units at an average density of 296.7 per square mile (114.6/km^{2}). The racial makeup of the CDP was 98.04% White and 1.96% Asian. Hispanic or Latino of any race were 1.96% of the population.

There were 26 households, out of which 11.5% had children under the age of 18 living with them, 69.2% were married couples living together, and 30.8% were non-families. 30.8% of all households were made up of individuals, and 23.1% had someone living alone who was 65 years of age or older. The average household size was 1.96 and the average family size was 2.39.

In the CDP, the population was spread out, with 11.8% under the age of 18, 2.0% from 18 to 24, 15.7% from 25 to 44, 21.6% from 45 to 64, and 49.0% who were 65 years of age or older. The median age was 62 years. For every 100 females, there were 82.1 males. For every 100 females age 18 and over, there were 80.0 males.

The median income for a household in the CDP was $25,500, and the median income for a family was $27,250. Males had a median income of $26,875 versus $11,875 for females. The per capita income for the CDP was $13,170. There were 13.0% of families and 14.8% of the population living below the poverty line, including 36.4% of under eighteens and none of those over 64.

== Education ==
It is in the Corsica-Stickney School District 21-3.
