= Armour High School =

Coordinates: 43°19′11.64″N 98°20′52.57″W

- 604 Third Street; Armour, (Douglas County), South Dakota 57313; United States

Information
- Type: Public high school
- Principal: Craig Holbeck
- Staff: 6.93 (FTE)
- Enrollment: 52 (2023-24)
- Student to teacher ratio: 7.50
- Colors: Carolina blue, black and gray
- Mascot: Nighthawks
- Website: Official website

Armour High School is the only high school in Armour, South Dakota. It is the only high school in Armour School District 21–1, which also includes an elementary and a middle school. Armour High School's athletic teams were formerly nicknamed the "Packers" and played in Class B of the South Dakota High School Activities Association.

Armour plays all sports (as of the 2007–08 school year) in conjunction with Tripp-Delmont High School; these teams are known as the Tripp-Delmont/Armour Nighthawks and play in Class 9AA (American Football) and Class B in all other sports (boys' and girls' basketball, volleyball, and boys' and girls' track & field). Tripp-Delmont High School plays golf independently.
