= Greenwood Colony, South Dakota =

- Census-designated place
- Location within South Dakota Location within the United States
- Coordinates: 43°12′52″N 98°09′13″W
- Country: United States
- State: South Dakota
- County: Douglas

Area
  - Total: 0.24 sq mi (0.61 km^{2})
  - Land: 0.24 sq mi (0.61 km^{2})
  - Water: 0 sq mi (0.00 km^{2})
- Elevation: 1,614 ft (492 m)

Population (2020)
  - Total: 11
  - Density: 46.9/sq mi (18.09/km^{2})
- Time zone: UTC-6 (Central (CST))
  - Summer (DST): UTC-5 (CDT)
- ZIP Code: 57330 (Delmont)
- Area code: 605
- FIPS code: 46-26150
- GNIS feature ID: 2813017

Greenwood Colony is a Hutterite colony and census-designated place (CDP) in Douglas County, South Dakota, United States. The population was 11 at the 2020 census. It was first listed as a CDP prior to the 2020 census.

It is in the southeast part of the county, bordered to the south by Charles Mix County. It is 5 miles (8 km) south of Delmont.

== Demographics ==
Historical population
Census	Pop.	Note	%±
2020	11		—
U.S. Decennial Census

== Education ==
It is in the Tripp-Delmont School District 33-5.
