= Delmont State Bank =

- U.S. National Register of Historic Places
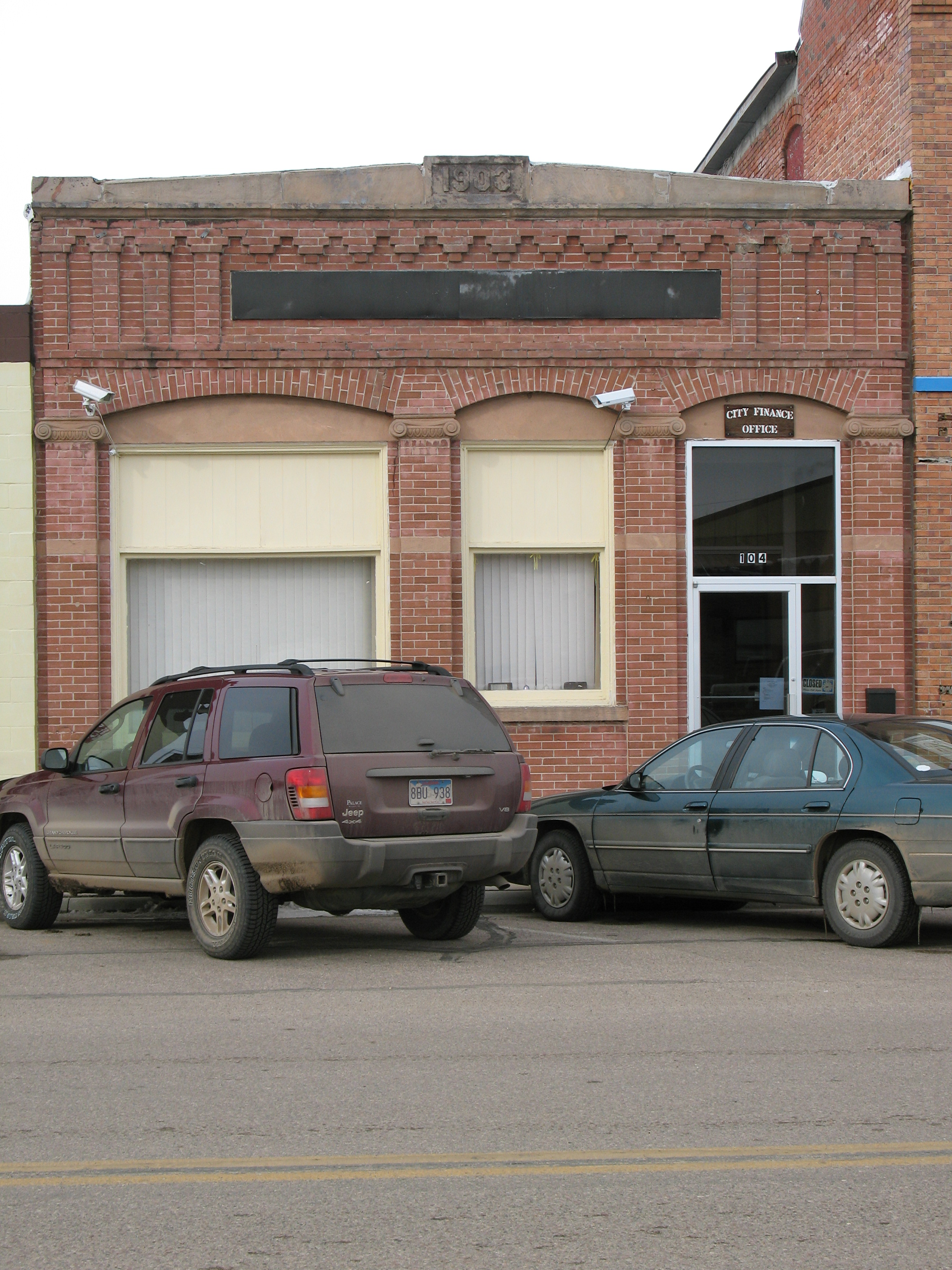

- Location within South Dakota Location within the United States
- Location: 104 W. Main St., Delmont, South Dakota
- Coordinates: 43°16′11″N 98°9′46″W
- Area: less than one acre
- Built: 1903
- Architectural style: Early Commercial
- NRHP reference No.: 08000044
- Added to NRHP: February 19, 2008

The former Delmont State Bank is a historic bank building at 104 West Main Street in Delmont, South Dakota. It is a single-story brick structure, with a flat roof. Its main facade has three bays, two with plate glass windows of differing size on the left, and the main entry (formerly recessed, now enclosed) on the right. The facade is topped by a corbelled brick parapet, whose central section is topped by a concrete cap in which the year of construction, 1903, is incised. The Delmont State Bank was one of two banks established in Delmont in the early 1900s. The other folded in 1933, while the Delmont State Bank was merged into the First State Bank of Armour in 1966. After moving to larger facilities in 1976, the bank building was sold to the city for $1, and now houses city offices.

The building was listed on the National Register of Historic Places in 2008.

== See also ==
- National Register of Historic Places listings in Douglas County, South Dakota
