= Delmont Pumphouse =

- U.S. National Register of Historic Places
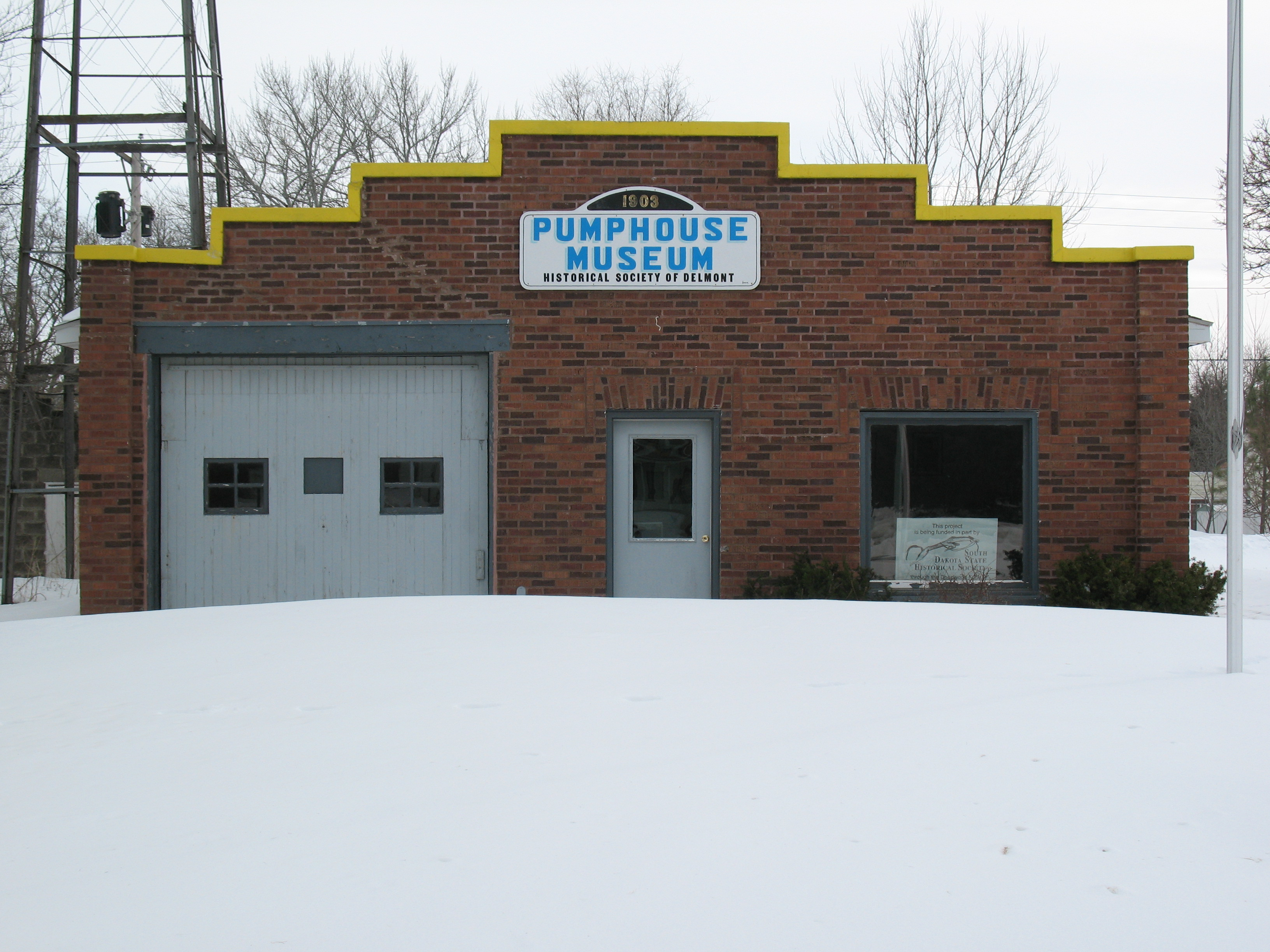

- Location within South Dakota Location within the United States
- Location: W. Main St., Delmont, South Dakota
- Coordinates: 43°16′3″N 98°9′49″W
- Area: less than one acre
- Built: 1907
- NRHP reference No.: 98000446
- Added to NRHP: May 8, 1998

The Delmont Pumphouse is a historic waterworks facility and fire station on West Main Street in Delmont, South Dakota. It is a single-story brick structure, built in 1903 by the city to house a compression tank for its water supply. In 1907 it was enlarged to also house the city's fire truck. It was used as a firehouse until 1968, and was used for storage thereafter. It has been restored and is now a museum operated by the Historical Society of Delmont.

The building was listed on the National Register of Historic Places in 1998.

== See also ==
- National Register of Historic Places listings in Douglas County, South Dakota
