= Bert Fenenga =

American football player and coach (1890–1981)

Biographical details
- Born: March 6, 1890; New Holland, South Dakota, U.S.
- Died: September 20, 1981 (aged 91); Santa Barbara, California, U.S.
- Education: Yankton

Coaching career (HC unless noted)
- 1917: Northern Normal

Head coaching record
- Overall: 6–0

Lambertus Emaline "Bert" Fenenga (March 6, 1890 – September 20, 1981) was an American football player and coach. He served as the head football coach at Northern Normal and Industrial School—now known was Northern State University—in Aberdeen, South Dakota in 1917, compiling a record of 6–0.

As an undergraduate, he was credited with giving Yankton College its nickname, the "Greyhounds."

== Head coaching record ==
Year	Team	Overall	Conference	Standing	Bowl/playoffs
Northern Normal (Independent) (1917)
1917	Northern Normal	6–0			
Northern Normal:		6–0			
Total:		6–0			
