= Benjamin H. Adams =

United States Navy officer (1888–1927)

Dr. Benjamin Harrison Adams
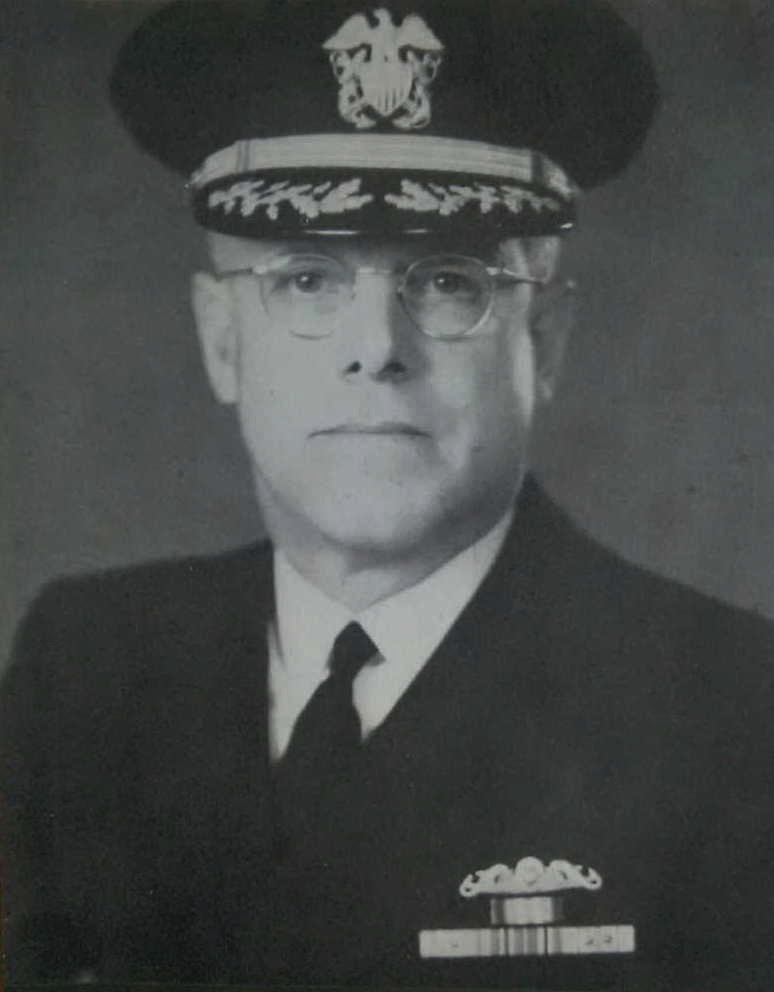
- Born: November 5, 1888; Armour, South Dakota, US
- Died: May 27, 1989 (aged 100); Baltimore, Maryland, US
- Burial place: United States Naval Academy Cemetery
- Education: University of Iowa (1918)
- Spouse: Marguerite Schaeffer
- Military career
- Allegiance: United States
- Branch: United States Army; United States Navy
- Service years: 1918-1950
- Rank: Rear admiral
- Commands: US Naval Academy Hospital
- Conflicts: World War I World War II •Philippines campaign
- Awards: Commendation Medal

Benjamin Harrison Adams (November 5, 1888 – May 27, 1989) was a medical officer in the United States Navy who served during World War I and World War II and reached the rank of rear admiral.

== Early life and education ==
Adams was born in Armour, South Dakota, son of Winthrop Lucius and Ellen Amelia Adams (née Moore). In 1912 he began attending Northwestern University in Evanston, Illinois. In 1913 he transferred to Cornell College, in Mount Vernon, Iowa, and again in 1914 to the University of Iowa in Iowa City. He graduated with a Doctor of Medicine in 1918 and briefly served with the United States Army.

== Career ==
=== World War One ===
Adams transferred to Naval Service on 15 June 1918 and was given the rank of Lieutenant (junior grade). His first assignment was at the naval hospital at Great Lakes, Illinois. Adams spent the remainder of World War I there, and completed a 15-month internship.

=== Inter-war years ===
In September 1919 Adams transferred to the Naval Reserve on inactive duty and returned to Sioux City, Iowa, to practice medicine. August 31, 1921, Adams returned to active duty in the Regular Navy, Medical Corps and was promoted to lieutenant. Adams returned to the naval hospital at Great Lakes as a ward medical officer. After two years at Great Lakes, Adams was assigned to the USS Idaho (BB-42) as a junior medical officer and spent 11 months at sea. Upon returning, Adams was transferred to the USS Vega (AK-17) as a medical officer for ten months. In July 1925, he reported for duty at the Naval Hospital at Puget Sound, Washington, until March 1927. His next assignment was medical examiner at the navy recruiting station in Seattle, Washington.

Adams was among the first Navy doctors to be designated as a submarine medical officer. In September 1928 he reported for duty as a submarine personnel examiner at the submarine base in Pearl Harbor, Hawaii. After completing this assignment in June 1930, Adams spent a year studying at the Naval Medical School in Washington, D.C. He then went on to study physiology at the School of Public Health, Harvard University, in Cambridge Massachusetts. On April 25, 1932, Adams was named a research fellow in physiology.

In September 1932, Adams reported to his next assignment as a medical examiner at the submarine Base in New London, Connecticut. In October 1934, he finished his assignment and was transferred to the light cruiser USS Raleigh (CL-7). Adams served on the USS Raleigh for a year, and then spent another year aboard the minelayer USS Oglala. In September 1936, Adams returned to shore duty and conducted chemical warfare research at the medical research unit, Edgewood Arsenal in Edgewood, Maryland. After completing his research he attended the staff officers course in chemical warfare.

=== World War Two ===
In July 1940, CDR Adams joined Submarine Squadron Five, part of the Asiatic Fleet as a staff medical officer and served aboard the flagship USS Canopus (AS-9). The USS Canopus was moored at Manila during the Japanese invasion of the Philippines. Adams established the first aid stations ashore and removed valuable medical supplies before the Japanese could capture them. For his actions, Adams was awarded a Letter of Commendation with Ribbon with combat distinguishing "V" device. With the withdrawal of US Forces from Manila to Bataan, Adams became the senior naval medical officer in the Bataan-Corregidor area. Adams was ordered to Java, traveling there aboard the USS Seadragon (SS-194) and then to Southwest Australia aboard the USS Holland (AS-3). In July 1942, Adams was transferred to the USS Otus (ARG-20) and returned to the United States.

In November 1942, CAPT Adams became the executive officer of the naval hospital in St. Albans, New York. Finishing his assignment in February 1944, he received his second Letter of Commendation from the Secretary of the Navy for his service there. From March 1944 until January 1946, Adams served in the Navy's Bureau of Medicine and Surgery in Washington, D.C. In February 1947, CAPT Adams became the medical officer in command of the US Naval Academy Hospital in Annapolis, Maryland.

=== Post-War and retirement ===
In August 1949 he became a member of the Naval Retiring Review Board. A few months later, Adams became a senior medical member of the Physical Evaluation Board of the Potomac River Naval Command in Washington, D.C. He kept this position until his retirement on December 1, 1950. After his retirement, Adams was promoted to the rank of rear admiral

Adams and his wife settled on a farm in the Abingdon, Maryland, area after his retirement. Adams was a member of the Mayflower Society and a volunteer with the American Red Cross. Adams was honoured in 1985, when he was designated as a Harford County Living Treasure. He died at Church Hospital in Baltimore, Maryland, at age 100. His body was interred in the United States Naval Academy Cemetery in Annapolis, Maryland.
