= Maurice Darney =

French astronomer (1882–1958)

- Born: Maurice Henri Laurent Darney; January 20, 1882; Paris, France
- Died: August 14, 1958 (aged 76); Montreuil-aux-Lions, France
- Known for: Darney Crater; Mare Imbrium

Maurice Henri Laurent Darney (/dærˈneɪ/; dar-NAY; January 20, 1882 – August 14, 1958) was a French astronomer and selenographer. He published maps of lunar surface features, including mountains and lava plains, while working at the Paris Observatory. The International Astronomical Union (IAU) named Darney crater after him in 1935.

== Biography ==
Darney was born in the 20th arrondissement of Paris in France in 1882. In his early career, he used hot air balloons to make astronomical observations with fewer atmospheric distortions. He documented his first balloon flight in 1902 in the Paris journal L'Aéronautique and published a paper on the use of balloons for lunar astronomy there in 1908.

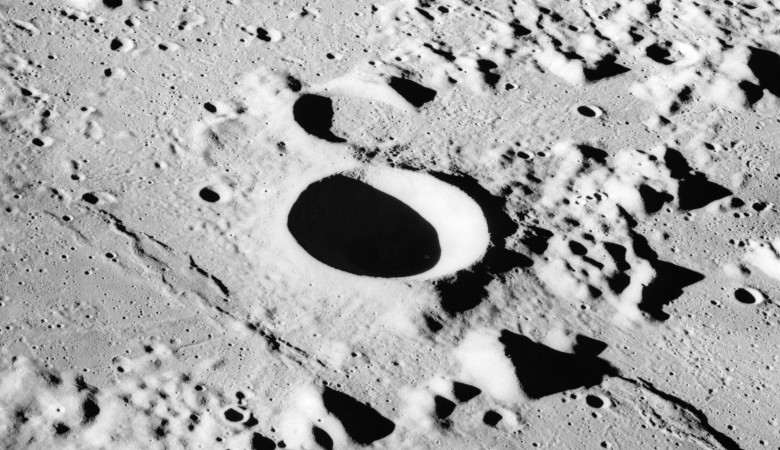
Darney crater imaged by the crew of Apollo 16

He worked at the Paris Observatory and the Meudon Observatory, studying the topography of surface features on the Moon. In 1922, he published a map of the Montes Caucasus mountain range in the journal L'Astronomie. He also studied the Sea of Rains, a vast lunar plain, publishing in the Belgian Astronomical Society's Ciel et Terre journal in 1934. Darney collaborated with astronomers including Gabriel Delmotte, Félix Chemla Lamèch, and Arthur Pierot. He and Delmotte independently discovered the network of linear troughs radial to the Imbrium basin, a phenomenon later known as the "Imbrium sculpture", though their finding went largely unnoticed at the time.

Darney published the astronomical work Seleno, and a copy is kept by the Société astronomique de France, for which he served as a librarian. He also studied the topography of lunar impact craters and investigated solar phenomena including sunspots. He received multiple awards from the Société astronomique de France, including the Prix Maurice Ballot in 1922, a commemorative medal in 1924, and the Prix des Dames from the Société astronomique de France in 1928. In 1935, the IAU named a lunar crater between the Mare Nubium and Oceanus Procellarum after Darney.

He died in Montreuil-aux-Lions, Hauts-de-France region, in 1958, aged 76.
