= Del Monte =

Del Monte may refer to:

== Places ==
- Del Monte Airfield, a heavy bomber-capable airfield in the Philippines
- Del Monte, Monterey, California, an unincorporated community in Monterey County, California, USA
- Del Monte Forest, California, a census-designated place in California, USA
- Brunyarra, now known as Del Monte, is a historic house in Strathfield, New South Wales, Australia
- San Jose del Monte, a city in the province of Bulacan, Philippines

== Others ==
- Del Monte Foods, an American food production and distribution company
  - Del Monte Kitchenomics, its cooking show in the Philippines
- Del Monte Corporation, an American fruit production and distribution company
  - Del Monte Kenya, its Kenyan subsidiary
- Del Monte Motors, Filipino bus and truck manufacturer
- Del Monte (train), a passenger train run by the Southern Pacific Railroad
- del Monte (surname)

== See also ==
- Delmont (disambiguation)
- Delmotte
