= Stanisław Lubieniecki =

Polish theologist (1623–1675)

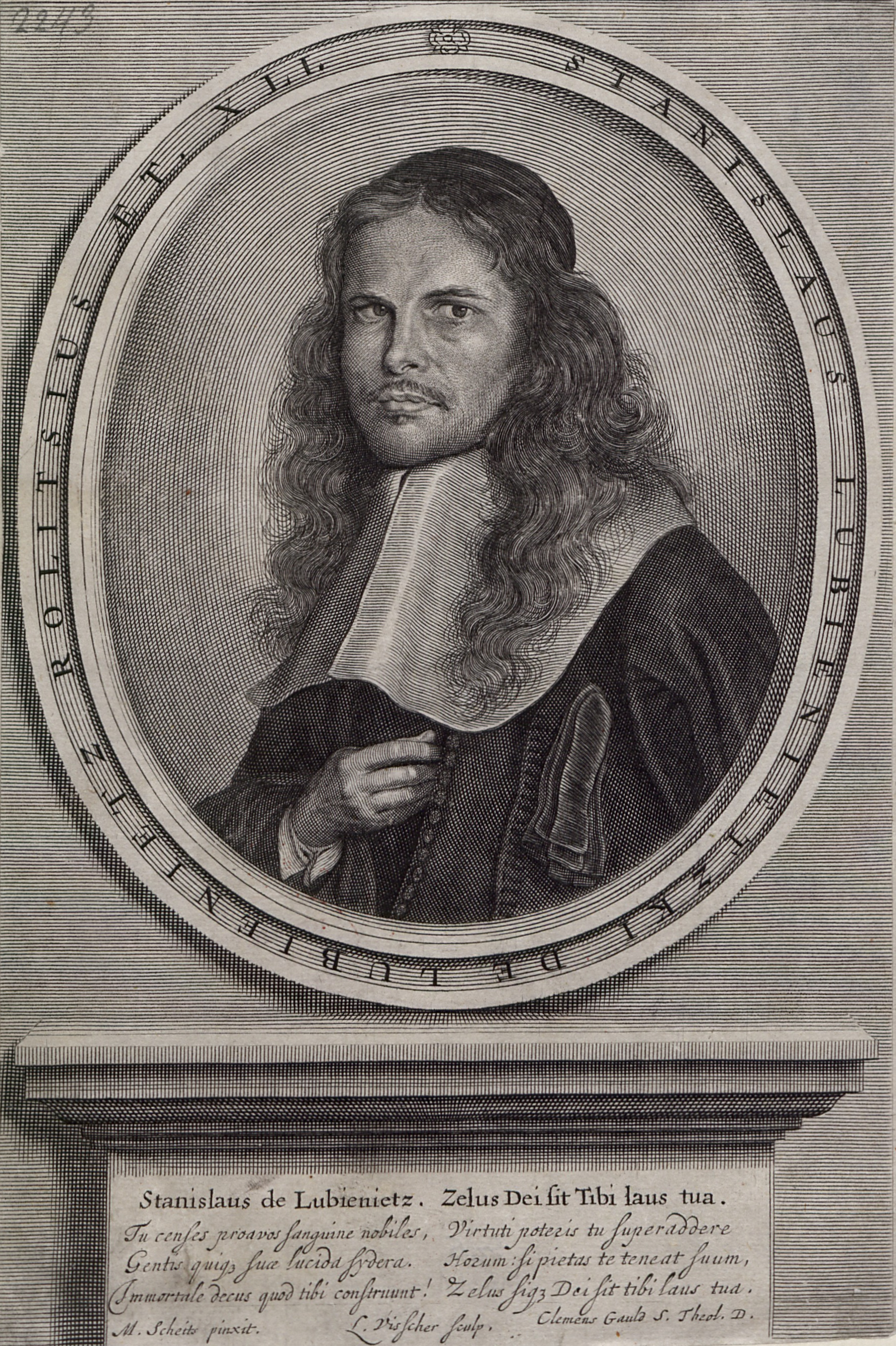
Stanisław Lubieniecki

Stanisław Lubieniecki (German: Stanislaus de Lubienietz, also Lubiniezky or Lubyenyetsky) (August 23, 1623 in Raków – May 18, 1675 in Hamburg) was a Polish Socinian theologist, historian, astronomer, and writer. He is the eponym of the lunar crater Lubiniezky.

== Family ==
He was born into an aristocratic family closely linked with Socinianism:

Father: Krzysztof Lubieniecki (1598–1648) Arian minister
Son: Teodor Bogdan Lubieniecki (1654 – c. 1718) painter, graphic artist
Son: Krzysztof Lubieniecki (1659–1729) painter, engraver
Grandfather: Krzysztof Lubieniecki (1561–1624) Arian writer
Uncle: Andrzej Lubieniecki Jr. (1590–1667) historian
Grandfather's brother: Stanisław Lubieniecki (1558–1633) Arian theologian
Grandfather's brother: Andrzej Lubieniecki (c. 1551 – 1623) Arian writer – author of Poloneutychia
Uncle: Florian Morsztyn (c. 1530 – 1587)
Uncle: Mikołaj Przypkowski (c. 1570 – 1672)
Uncle: Joachim Rupniowski (died 1641) Arian minister

== Life ==
From 1646 to 1650, Stanislaus studied at the Racovian Academy.

His Socinian hometown Raków, Sandomierz Voivodeship of Lesser Poland, was founded about a hundred years earlier and had about 15,000 inhabitants. A decree by the Polish Sejm of 1639 forbade religions other than Catholicism (Counter-Reformation). The inhabitants of his hometown were expelled and their homes destroyed and by 1700 only 700 people remained.

Stanislaus then went to study in France and the Netherlands, he came to live in Hamburg where he met considerable resistance from the Lutheran clergy. Lubieniecki and his two daughters Catherine Salomea and Griselda Constance, died of mercury poisoning, probably as the result of a mistake by a domestic servant. His wife survived.

== Works ==
- Historia Reformationis Polonicae : in qua tum reformatorum tum antitrinitariorum origo & progressus in Polonia & finitimis provinciis narrantur. 1685. published posthumously by Benedykt Wiszowaty
- Theatrum cometicum, duabus partibus constans. 1668. Is an illustrated anthology of 415 comets from the biblical epoch of the deluge up until 1665.
