= Delmont Public School =

- U.S. National Register of Historic Places
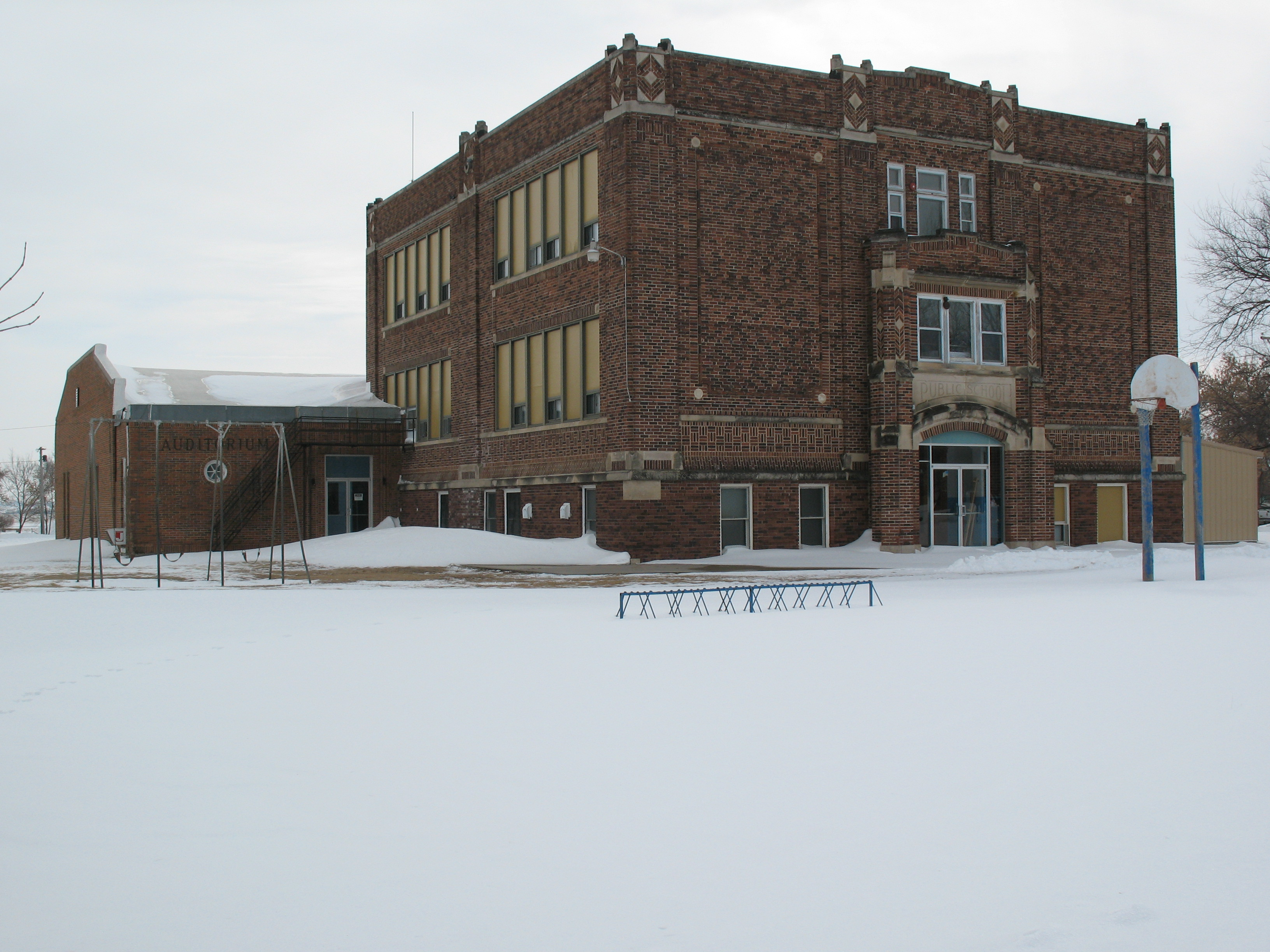

- Location within South Dakota Location within the United States
- Location: 205 W. Third, Delmont, South Dakota
- Coordinates: 43°15′54″N 98°9′51″W
- Area: less than one acre
- Built: 1938
- Architect: George Grabe
- Architectural style: Late Gothic Revival
- NRHP reference No.: 94000560
- Added to NRHP: June 3, 1994

The Delmont Public School is a historic former school building at 205 West Third Street in Delmont, South Dakota. It is a three-story brick building, designed by the Nebraska firm of Grabe and Hellberg and built in 1923. Its styling is a vernacular rendition of Collegiate Gothic, with a central entrance framed by buttresses rising to an arch at the second level. The auditorium, added in 1938, extends from the rear of the main block.

The building was listed on the National Register of Historic Places in 1994. The school has since been closed and sold into private hands.

== See also ==
- National Register of Historic Places listings in Douglas County, South Dakota
