= Montreuil-aux-Lions =

- Commune
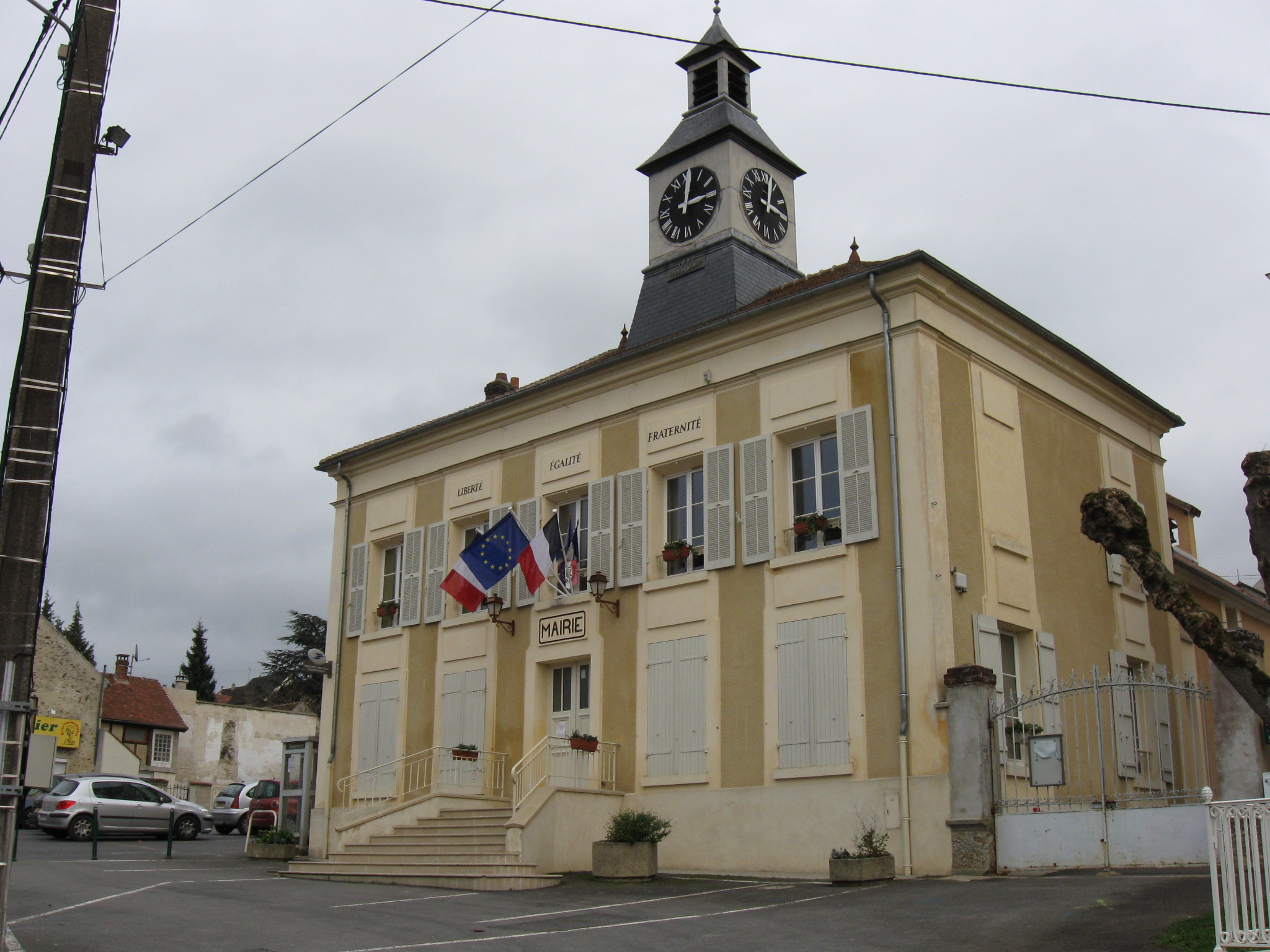
- Town hall
- Location of Montreuil-aux-Lions
- Location within France Location within Hauts-de-France
- Coordinates: 49°01′20″N 3°11′47″E
- Country: France
- Region: Hauts-de-France
- Department: Aisne
- Arrondissement: Château-Thierry
- Canton: Essômes-sur-Marne
- Intercommunality: Charly sur Marne

Government
  - Mayor (2026–32): Jean-Claude Lebegue
- Area^{1}: 12.99 km^{2} (5.02 sq mi)
- Elevation: 150 m (490 ft)
- Highest elevation: 214 m (702 ft)
- Lowest elevation: 65 m (213 ft)
- Population (2023): 1,305
  - Density: 100.5/km^{2} (260.2/sq mi)
- Time zone: UTC+01:00 (CET)
  - Summer (DST): UTC+02:00 (CEST)
- INSEE/Postal code: 02521 /02310
- ^{1} French Land Register data, which excludes lakes, ponds, glaciers > 1 km^{2} (0.386 sq mi or 247 acres) and river estuaries.

Montreuil-aux-Lions is a commune in the Aisne department in Hauts-de-France in northern France.

== Population ==
Historical population
Year	Pop.	±% p.a.
1968	585	—
1975	630	+1.06%
1982	701	+1.54%
1990	1,001	+4.55%
1999	1,197	+2.01%
2007	1,352	+1.53%
2012	1,395	+0.63%
2017	1,369	−0.38%
2023	1,305	−0.79%
Source: INSEE

== Mayors ==
- Charles Bauchot (1983-1989)
- Jacques Delammare (1989-2001)
- Yves Fouquet (2001-2008)
- Olivier Devron (2008-)

== Notable people ==
- Maurice Darney, French astronomer (1882–1958)
- Lucien Descaves, French novelist (1861–1949)

== See also ==
- Communes of the Aisne department
