= New Holland, South Dakota =

- Census-designated place
- Location in Douglas County and the state of South Dakota
- Coordinates: 43°25′43″N 98°36′26″W
- Country: United States
- State: South Dakota
- County: Douglas

Area
  - Total: 0.12 sq mi (0.30 km^{2})
  - Land: 0.12 sq mi (0.30 km^{2})
  - Water: 0 sq mi (0.00 km^{2})
- Elevation: 1,598 ft (487 m)

Population (2020)
  - Total: 77
  - Density: 662/sq mi (255.5/km^{2})
- Time zone: UTC-6 (Central (CST))
  - Summer (DST): UTC-5 (CDT)
- ZIP code: 57364
- Area code: 605
- FIPS code: 46-44940
- GNIS feature ID: 2393147

New Holland is a census-designated place (CDP) in Douglas County, South Dakota, United States. The population was 77 at the 2020 census.

A large share of the early settlers being natives of Holland caused the name to be selected.

== Geography ==
According to the United States Census Bureau, the CDP has a total area of 0.1 square miles (0.26 km^{2}), all land.

== Demographics ==
Historical population
Census	Pop.	Note	%±
2020	77		—
U.S. Decennial Census

As of the census of 2000, there were 78 people, 39 households, and 21 families residing in the CDP. The population density was 669.6 inhabitants per square mile (258.5/km^{2}). There were 44 housing units at an average density of 377.7 per square mile (145.8/km^{2}). The racial makeup of the CDP was 96.15% White and 3.85% Native American.

There were 39 households, out of which 17.9% had children under the age of 18 living with them, 53.8% were married couples living together, and 43.6% were non-families. 43.6% of all households were made up of individuals, and 35.9% had someone living alone who was 65 years of age or older. The average household size was 2.00 and the average family size was 2.68.

In the CDP, the population was spread out, with 21.8% under the age of 18, 2.6% from 18 to 24, 19.2% from 25 to 44, 20.5% from 45 to 64, and 35.9% who were 65 years of age or older. The median age was 54 years. For every 100 females, there were 73.3 males. For every 100 females age 18 and over, there were 69.4 males.

The median income for a household in the CDP was $23,750, and the median income for a family was $31,875. Males had a median income of $19,500 versus $48,750 for females. The per capita income for the CDP was $13,016. There were no families and 5.6% of the population living below the poverty line, including no under eighteens and 17.4% of those over 64.

== Education ==
It is in the Platte-Geddes School District 11-5.
