= Lubiniezky (crater) =

Crater on the Moon

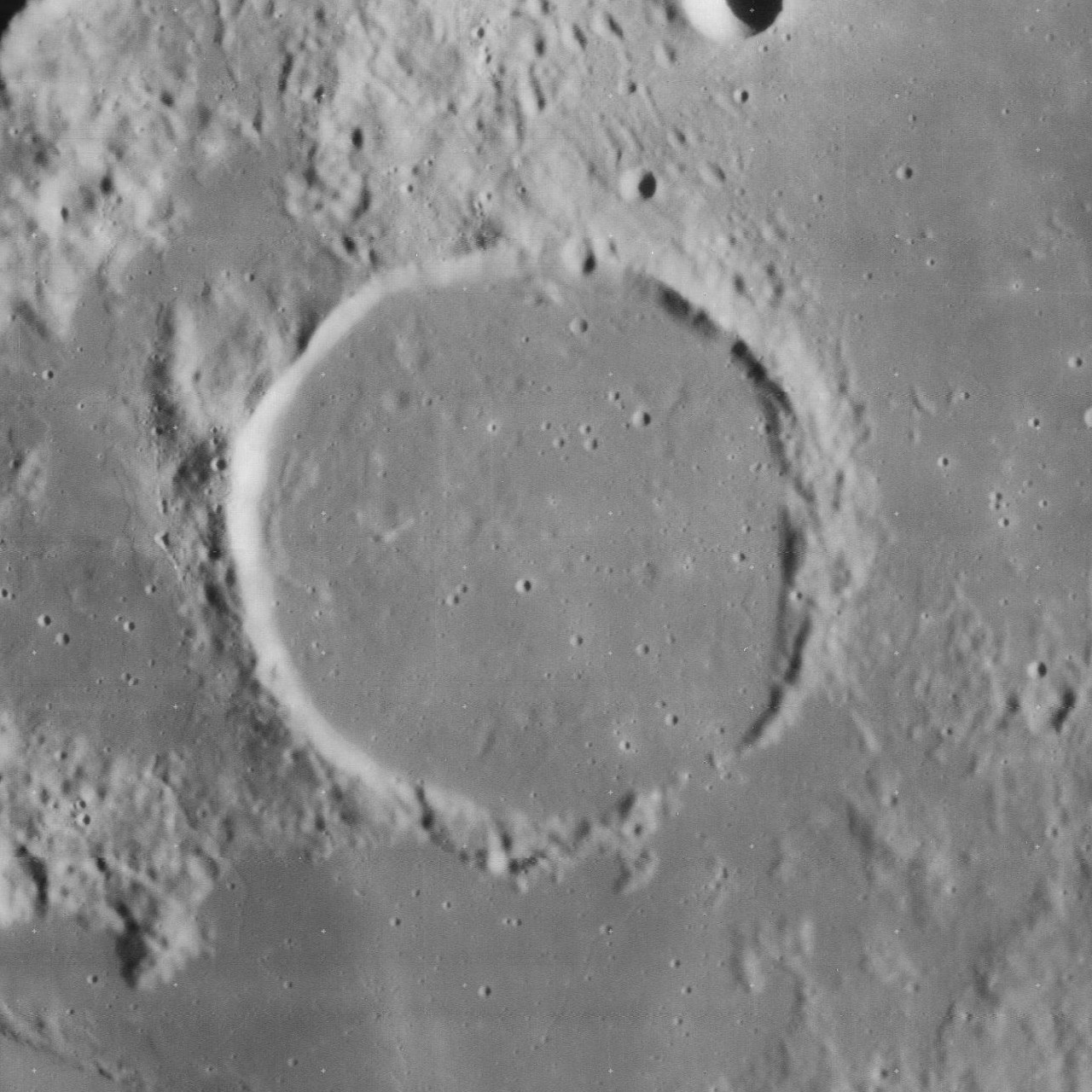
- Lunar Orbiter 4 image
- Coordinates: 17.8°S 23.8°W
- Diameter: 44 km
- Depth: 0.65 km (0.40 mi)
- Colongitude: 24° at sunrise
- Eponym: Stanisław Lubieniecki

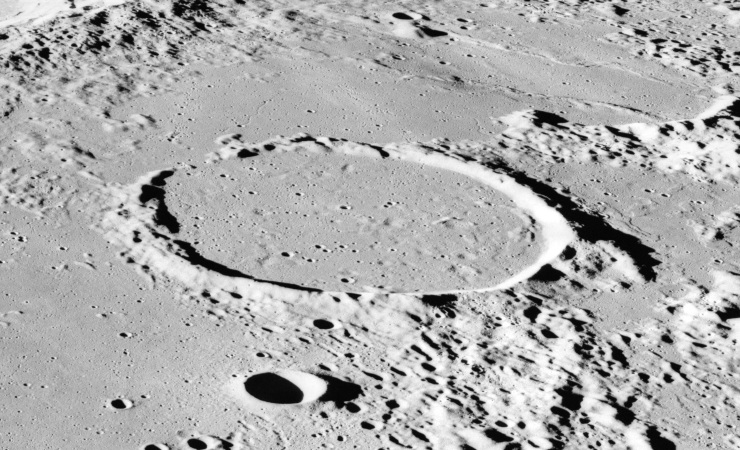
Oblique view facing south from Apollo 16

Lubiniezky is a lava-flooded lunar impact crater on the northwest edge of Mare Nubium. It was named after Polish astronomer Stanisław Lubieniecki. This feature is most readily located by finding the prominent crater Bullialdus to the southeast.

The floor of Lubiniezky has been resurfaced by basaltic lava, which most likely entered from the surrounding mare through the gap in the southeast wall. The surviving rim forms a curved, worn rise around the relatively flat and featureless inner floor. The rim is joined by ridges attached to the north and west walls. To the north of this feature is the bowl-shaped crater Darney. The associated craters Lubiniezky A and E are also flooded, and lie to the northwest.

== Satellite craters ==
By convention these features are identified on lunar maps by placing the letter on the side of the crater midpoint that is closest to Lubiniezky.

Lubiniezky	Latitude	Longitude	Diameter
A	16.4° S	25.6° W	30 km
D	16.5° S	23.4° W	8 km
E	16.6° S	27.3° W	37 km
F	18.3° S	21.8° W	8 km
G	15.3° S	20.2° W	4 km
H	17.0° S	21.2° W	4 km

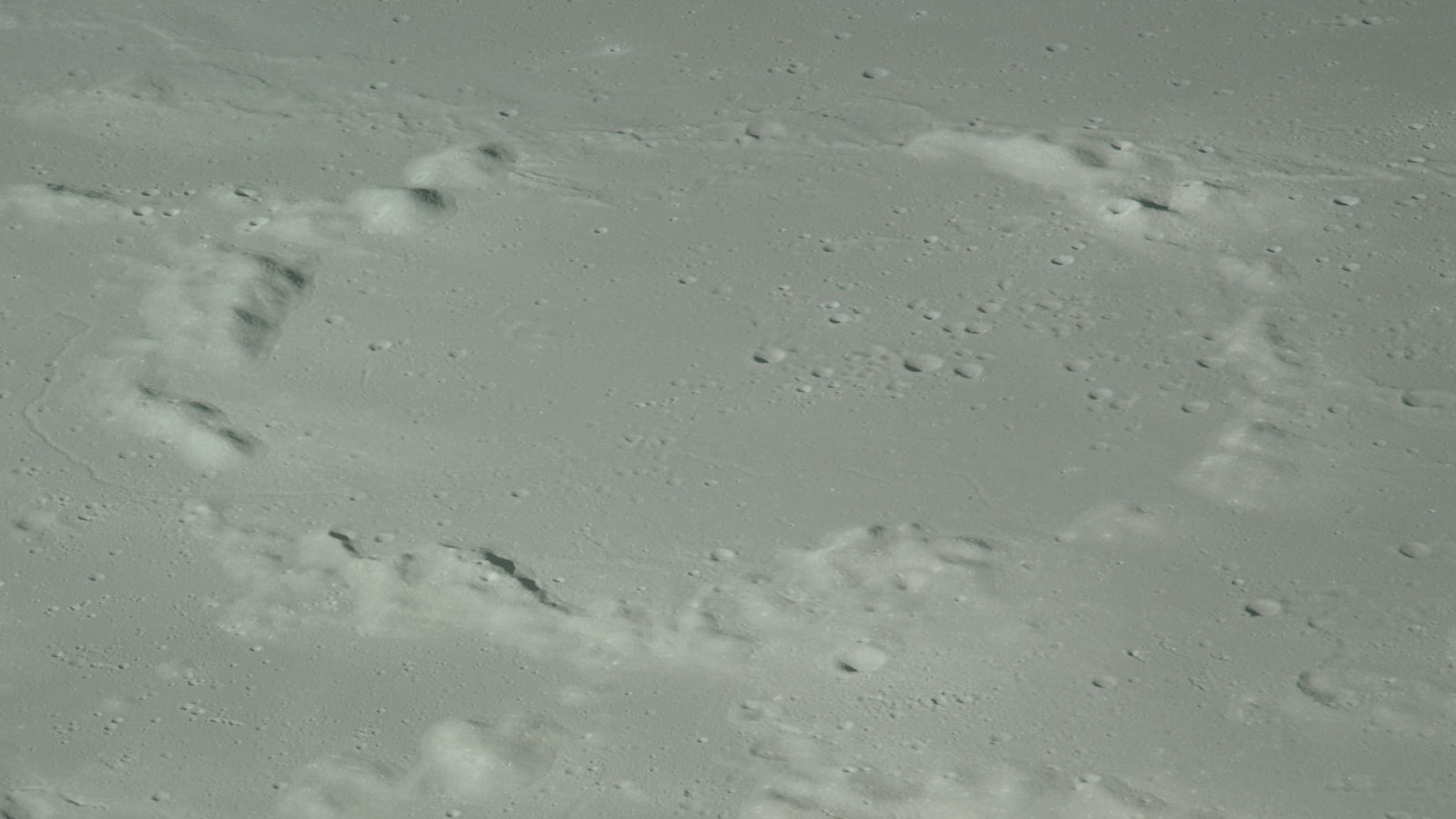
Lubiniezky E

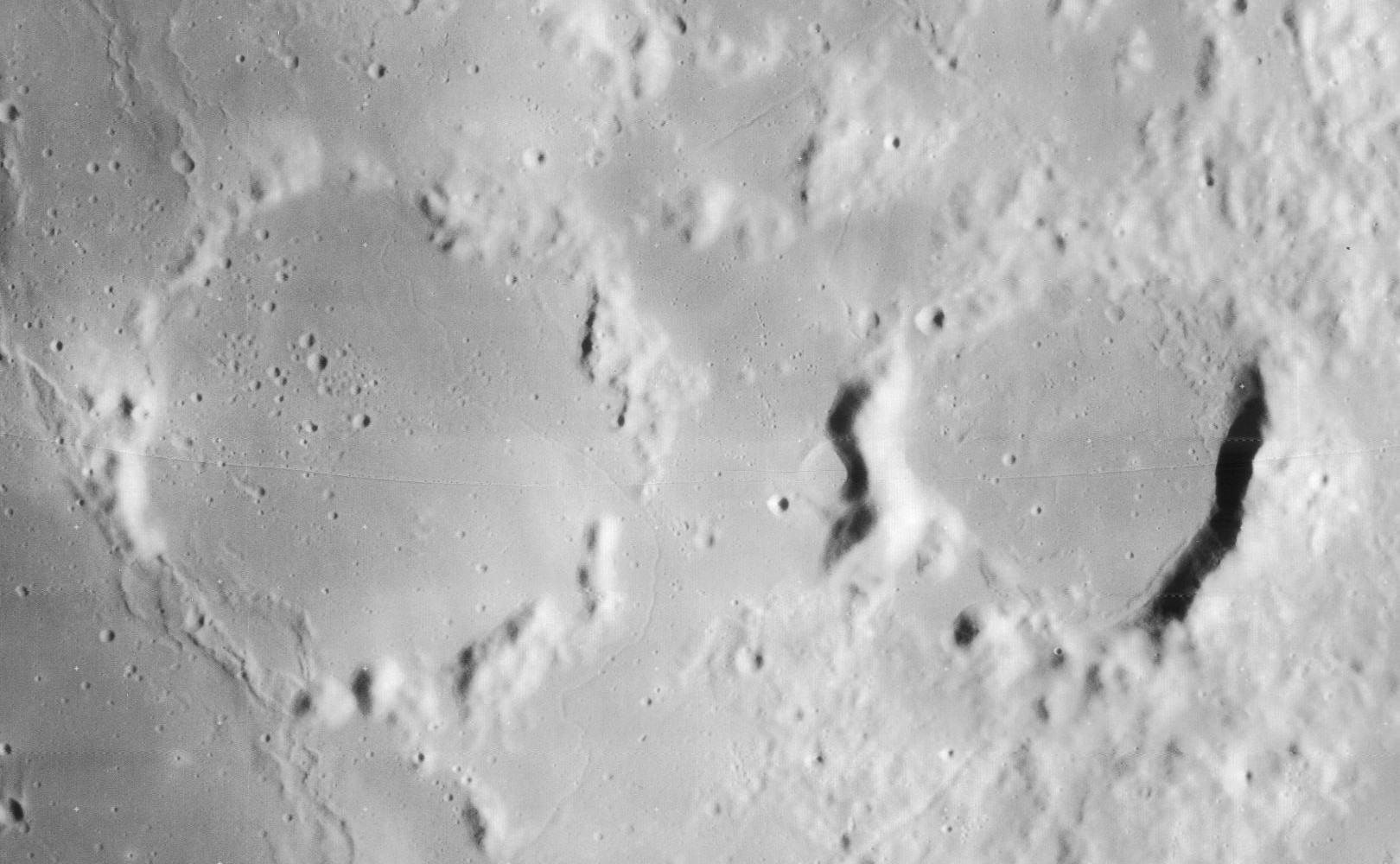
Lubiniezky E (left) and A (right)

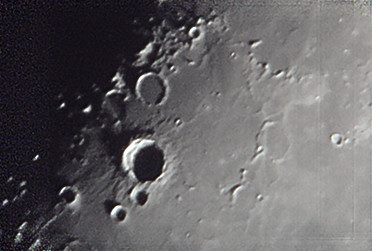
Lubiniezky crater as viewed from earth, above left of center
