= Delmotte (crater) =

Crater on the Moon

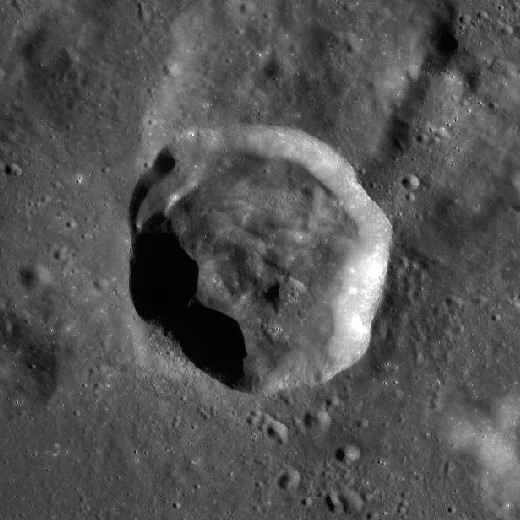
- LRO mosaic
- Coordinates: 27.1°N 60.2°E
- Diameter: 32.16 km (19.98 mi)
- Depth: 3.0 km (1.9 mi)
- Colongitude: 300° at sunrise
- Eponym: Gabriel Delmotte

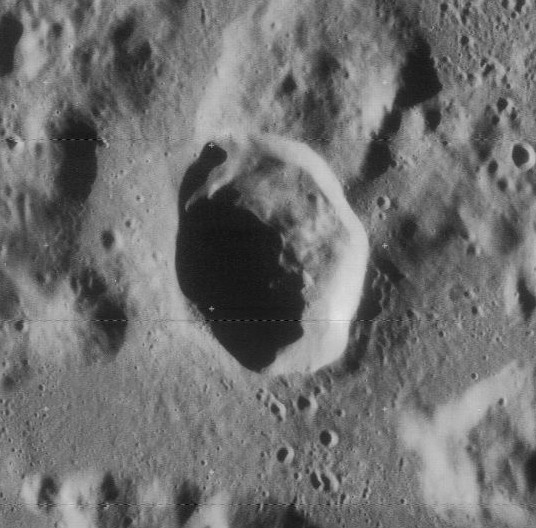
Oblique Lunar Orbiter 4 image

Delmotte is a small lunar impact crater that lies just to the east of the much larger crater Cleomedes, and to the north of the Mare Crisium, in the northeastern part of the Moon. Delmotte appears foreshortened when viewed from the Earth, although not sufficiently to obscure the interior details.

The crater rim is oblong, with a sharp-edged, slightly angular rim, and a slender inner wall. The northwestern part of the rim has a linear cleft that runs toward the northeast. The floor of the crater is relatively uneven. There are some patches of lighter albedo in the interior, with the most notable lying near the northern inner wall.

This formation is named after French astronomer Gabriel Delmotte (1876-1950). His name was included in the lunar nomenclature of Félix C. Lamèch. Its designation was officially adopted by the International Astronomical Union in 1935.
