= Delmont, Ohio =

Unincorporated community in Ohio, U.S.

Coordinates: 39°40′58″N 82°40′51″W

Delmont is an unincorporated community in Fairfield County, in the U.S. state of Ohio.

== History ==
Delmont was a station on the Cincinnati and Muskingum Valley Railroad. A post office was established at Delmont in 1888, and remained in operation until 1905.
