= Gabriel Delmotte =

French astronomer, deputy and Mayor of Masnières

Gabriel Delmotte (5 February 1876 – 10 March 1950) was a French astronomer, deputy and Mayor of Masnières in the Nord department in northern France.

He was the author of Recherches sélénographiques et nouvelle théorie des cirques lunaires, which was published in 1923 in Paris. He and Maurice Darney independently discovered the network of linear troughs radial to the Imbrium basin, a phenomenon later known as the "Imbrium sculpture", though their finding went largely unnoticed at the time.

The crater Delmotte on the Moon is named after him.

== Sources ==
- Data from French Assemblée nationale
- Gabriel Delmotte, a French astronomer, specialist of the Moon
