= Corsica, South Dakota =

- City
- Location in Douglas County and the state of South Dakota
- Coordinates: 43°25′20″N 98°24′26″W
- Country: United States
- State: South Dakota
- County: Douglas
- Incorporated: 1905

Area
  - Total: 0.84 sq mi (2.18 km^{2})
  - Land: 0.84 sq mi (2.17 km^{2})
  - Water: 0.0039 sq mi (0.01 km^{2})
- Elevation: 1,572 ft (479 m)

Population (2020)
  - Total: 561
  - Density: 670.4/sq mi (258.85/km^{2})
- Time zone: UTC-6 (Central (CST))
  - Summer (DST): UTC-5 (CDT)
- ZIP code: 57328
- Area code: 605
- FIPS code: 46-13980
- GNIS feature ID: 1267338

Corsica is a city in Douglas County, South Dakota, United States. The population was 561 at the 2020 census.

== History ==
Corsica was laid out in 1905. The town took its name from Corsica, the native land of a share of the railroad workers.

== Geography ==
According to the United States Census Bureau, the city has a total area of 0.85 square miles (2.20 km^{2}), of which 0.84 square miles (2.18 km^{2}) is land and 0.01 square miles (0.03 km^{2}) is water.

== Demographics ==
Historical population
| Census | Pop. | Note | %± |
|---|---|---|---|
| 1910 | 286 | | — |
| 1920 | 346 | | 21.0% |
| 1930 | 516 | | 49.1% |
| 1940 | 452 | | −12.4% |
| 1950 | 551 | | 21.9% |
| 1960 | 479 | | −13.1% |
| 1970 | 615 | | 28.4% |
| 1980 | 644 | | 4.7% |
| 1990 | 619 | | −3.9% |
| 2000 | 644 | | 4.0% |
| 2010 | 592 | | −8.1% |
| 2020 | 561 | | −5.2% |
U.S. Decennial Census

=== 2020 census ===
As of the 2020 census, Corsica had a population of 561. The median age was 56.4 years. 17.1% of residents were under the age of 18 and 36.9% of residents were 65 years of age or older. For every 100 females there were 77.0 males, and for every 100 females age 18 and over there were 79.5 males age 18 and over.

0.0% of residents lived in urban areas, while 100.0% lived in rural areas.

There were 239 households in Corsica, of which 23.4% had children under the age of 18 living in them. Of all households, 57.3% were married-couple households, 15.1% were households with a male householder and no spouse or partner present, and 24.7% were households with a female householder and no spouse or partner present. About 35.1% of all households were made up of individuals and 18.8% had someone living alone who was 65 years of age or older.

There were 279 housing units, of which 14.3% were vacant. The homeowner vacancy rate was 0.0% and the rental vacancy rate was 28.1%.

Racial composition as of the 2020 census
| Race | Number | Percent |
|---|---|---|
| White | 521 | 92.9% |
| Black or African American | 3 | 0.5% |
| American Indian and Alaska Native | 7 | 1.2% |
| Asian | 0 | 0.0% |
| Native Hawaiian and Other Pacific Islander | 0 | 0.0% |
| Some other race | 2 | 0.4% |
| Two or more races | 28 | 5.0% |
| Hispanic or Latino (of any race) | 13 | 2.3% |

=== 2010 census ===
As of the census of 2010, there were 592 people, 245 households, and 153 families residing in the city. The population density was 704.8 inhabitants per square mile (272.1/km^{2}). There were 286 housing units at an average density of 340.5 per square mile (131.5/km^{2}). The racial makeup of the city was 97.6% White, 0.2% African American, 0.7% Native American, 0.2% Asian, and 1.4% from two or more races. Hispanic or Latino of any race were 1.0% of the population.

There were 245 households, of which 23.3% had children under the age of 18 living with them, 51.4% were married couples living together, 8.6% had a female householder with no husband present, 2.4% had a male householder with no wife present, and 37.6% were non-families. 31.4% of all households were made up of individuals, and 20.4% had someone living alone who was 65 years of age or older. The average household size was 2.20 and the average family size was 2.78.

The median age in the city was 53 years. 19.3% of residents were under the age of 18; 6.9% were between the ages of 18 and 24; 14.5% were from 25 to 44; 25.5% were from 45 to 64; and 33.8% were 65 years of age or older. The gender makeup of the city was 47.3% male and 52.7% female.

=== 2000 census ===
As of the census of 2000, there were 644 people, 259 households, and 163 families residing in the city. The population density was 967.4 inhabitants per square mile (373.5/km^{2}). There were 271 housing units at an average density of 407.1 per square mile (157.2/km^{2}). The racial makeup of the city was 99.07% White, 0.31% African American, 0.31% Native American, and 0.31% from two or more races.

There were 259 households, out of which 27.0% had children under the age of 18 living with them, 56.8% were married couples living together, 5.0% had a female householder with no husband present, and 36.7% were non-families. 35.1% of all households were made up of individuals, and 23.9% had someone living alone who was 65 years of age or older. The average household size was 2.24 and the average family size was 2.91.

In the city, the population was spread out, with 22.2% under the age of 18, 5.4% from 18 to 24, 17.9% from 25 to 44, 20.8% from 45 to 64, and 33.7% who were 65 years of age or older. The median age was 48 years. For every 100 females, there were 77.4 males. For every 100 females age 18 and over, there were 74.6 males.

The median income for a household in the city was $27,589, and the median income for a family was $34,531. Males had a median income of $26,136 versus $18,333 for females. The per capita income for the city was $13,370. About 7.3% of families and 9.4% of the population were below the poverty line, including 8.6% of those under age 18 and 16.7% of those age 65 or over.

== Education ==
It is in the Corsica-Stickney School District 21-3.
