= Darney (crater) =

Lunar crater

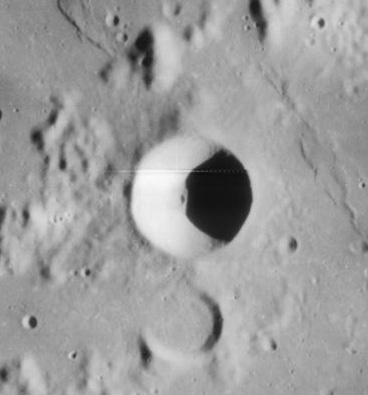
- Lunar Orbiter 4 image
- Coordinates: 14.5°S 23.5°W
- Diameter: 14.81 km (9.20 mi)
- Depth: 2.96 km (1.84 mi)
- Colongitude: 24° at sunrise
- Eponym: Maurice Darney

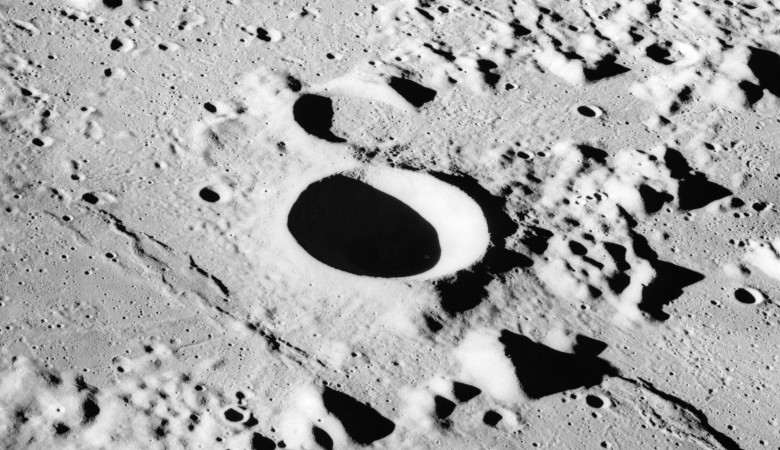
Oblique view facing south from Apollo 16

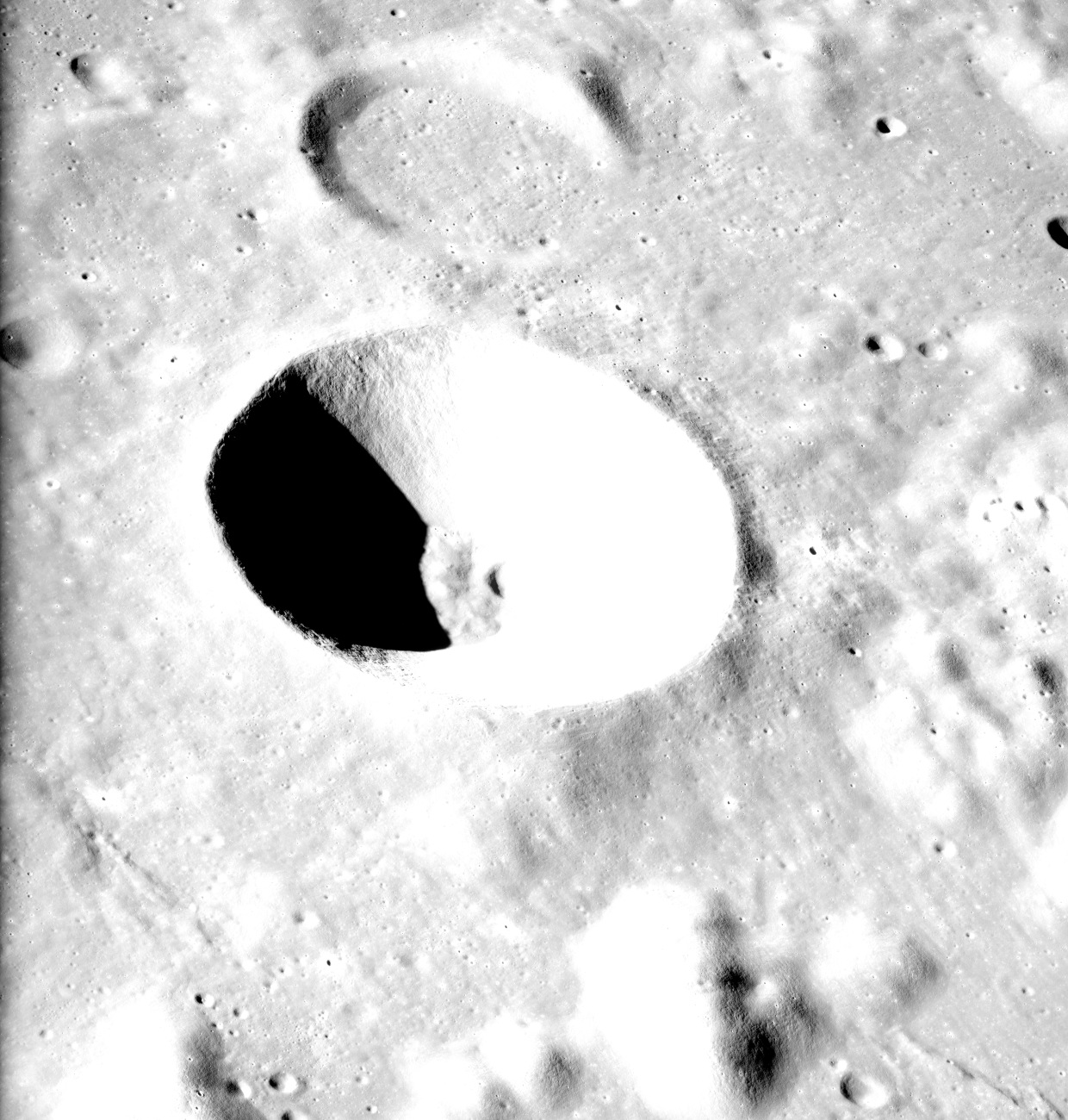
Another oblique view from Apollo 16

Darney is a small lunar impact crater that is located on the southern border of the Mare Cognitum. To the south is the lava-flooded crater Lubiniezky. The southern rim of Darney is attached to a series of low ridges that extend to the southwest.

This is a bowl-shaped formation with a small interior floor at the midpoint of the sloping inner walls. The crater has a relatively high albedo compared to the surrounding dark lunar mare, and it is at the focus of a small ray system extending for 110 kilometers.

This crater is named after French astronomer Maurice Darney (1882–1958). His name was included in the lunar nomenclature of Greek-French selenographer Félix Chemla Lamèch. Its designation was formally adopted by the International Astronomical Union in 1935.

== Darney and satellite crater Darney C during full moon ==
Darney and satellite crater Darney C (F. C. Lamèch's Piérot, west of Darney) are seen as a bright pair during full moon. Both craters look like a pair of staring eyes due to their bright inner slopes and dark floors. Their brightness is also noticeable on the photographic version of chart LAC 76 (page 152) in The Clementine Atlas of the Moon (Ben Bussey / Paul D. Spudis).

== Satellite craters ==
By convention these features are identified on lunar maps by placing the letter on the side of the crater midpoint that is closest to Darney.

Darney	Latitude	Longitude	Diameter
B	14.8° S	26.4° W	4 km
C	14.1° S	26.0° W	13 km
D	14.5° S	27.0° W	6 km
E	12.4° S	25.4° W	4 km
F	13.3° S	26.4° W	4 km
J	14.3° S	21.4° W	7 km
