= Douglas County, South Dakota =

County in South Dakota, United States

- County
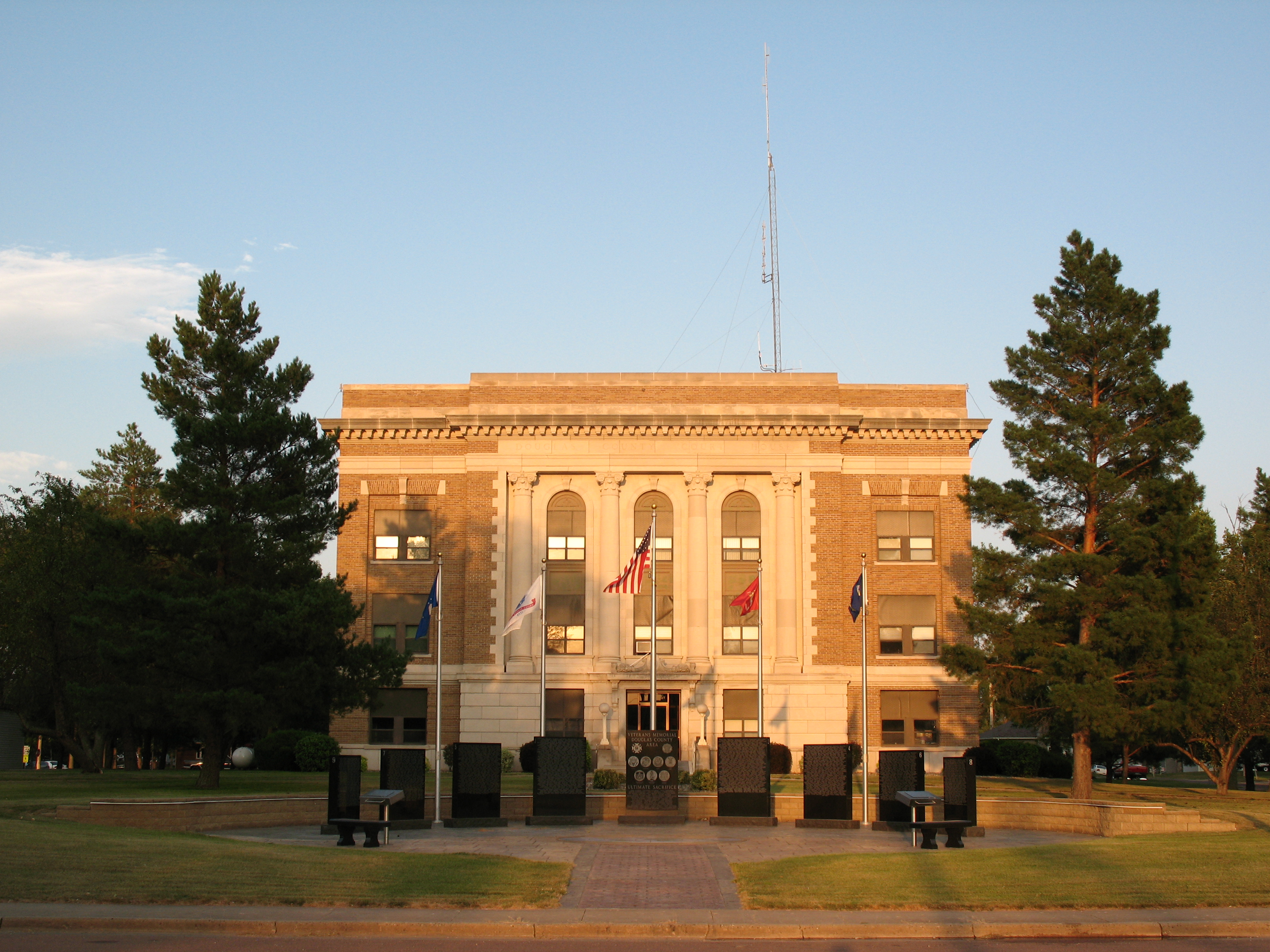
- Douglas County Courthouse in Armour

- Location within the U.S. state of South Dakota
- Coordinates: 43°23′N 98°22′W
- Country: United States
- State: South Dakota
- Created: 1873
- Organized: 1882
- Named for: Stephen A. Douglas
- Seat: Armour
- Largest city: Armour

Area
  - Total: 434 sq mi (1,120 km^{2})
  - Land: 432 sq mi (1,120 km^{2})
  - Water: 1.9 sq mi (4.9 km^{2}) 0.4%

Population (2020)
  - Total: 2,835
  - Estimate (2025): 2,888 ▲
  - Density: 6.7/sq mi (2.6/km^{2})
- Congressional district: At-large
- Website: douglas.sdcounties.org

Douglas County is a county in the U.S. state of South Dakota. As of the 2020 census, the population was 2,835. Its county seat is Armour. The county was established in 1873 and organized in 1882. It is named for Stephen Douglas, an Illinois political figure.

== Geography ==
The terrain of Douglas County consists of rolling hills, mostly dedicated to agriculture. The county's highest point is on its southwestern boundary, toward the SW corner, at 1,677 ft (511 m) ASL. The terrain slopes to the east. The county has a total area of 434 square miles (1,120 km^{2}), of which 432 square miles (1,120 km^{2}) is land and 1.9 square miles (4.9 km^{2}) (0.4%) is water. It is the second-smallest county in South Dakota by area.

=== Major highways ===
- U.S. Highway 18
- U.S. Highway 281
- South Dakota Highway 44
- South Dakota Highway 50

=== Adjacent counties ===
- Aurora County – north
- Davison County – northeast
- Hutchinson County – east
- Charles Mix County – southwest

=== Lakes ===
- Corsica Lake

== Demographics ==
Historical population
Census	Pop.	Note	%±
1890	4,600		—
1900	5,012		9.0%
1910	6,400		27.7%
1920	6,993		9.3%
1930	7,236		3.5%
1940	6,348		−12.3%
1950	5,636		−11.2%
1960	5,113		−9.3%
1970	4,569		−10.6%
1980	4,181		−8.5%
1990	3,746		−10.4%
2000	3,458		−7.7%
2010	3,002		−13.2%
2020	2,835		−5.6%
2025 (est.)	2,888	▲	1.9%
U.S. Decennial Census:

=== 2020 census ===
As of the 2020 census, the county had a population of 2,835, 1,134 households, and 779 families residing in the county.

The population density was 6.6 inhabitants per square mile (2.5/km^{2}).

Of the residents, 23.1% were under the age of 18 and 26.8% were 65 years of age or older; the median age was 46.6 years. For every 100 females there were 93.3 males, and for every 100 females age 18 and over there were 96.8 males.

The racial makeup of the county was 94.0% White, 0.2% Black or African American, 1.3% American Indian and Alaska Native, 0.1% Asian, 0.5% from some other race, and 3.8% from two or more races. Hispanic or Latino residents of any race comprised 1.9% of the population.

There were 1,134 households in the county, of which 26.5% had children under the age of 18 living with them and 17.3% had a female householder with no spouse or partner present. About 27.8% of all households were made up of individuals and 14.8% had someone living alone who was 65 years of age or older.

There were 1,341 housing units, of which 15.4% were vacant. Among occupied housing units, 79.9% were owner-occupied and 20.1% were renter-occupied. The homeowner vacancy rate was 0.8% and the rental vacancy rate was 19.7%.

=== 2010 census ===
As of the 2010 census, there were 3,002 people, 1,210 households, and 819 families in the county. The population density was 7.0 inhabitants per square mile (2.7/km^{2}). There were 1,439 housing units at an average density of 3.3 units per square mile (1.3 units/km^{2}). The racial makeup of the county was 96.6% white, 1.8% American Indian, 0.4% black or African American, 0.1% Asian, 0.3% from other races, and 0.9% from two or more races. Those of Hispanic or Latino origin made up 0.8% of the population. In terms of ancestry, 34.8% were Dutch, 33.9% were German, 5.6% were Norwegian, 5.5% were Irish, 5.4% were Russian, and 5.1% were American.

Of the 1,210 households, 25.5% had children under the age of 18 living with them, 60.8% were married couples living together, 4.2% had a female householder with no husband present, 32.3% were non-families, and 29.1% of all households were made up of individuals. The average household size was 2.33 and the average family size was 2.89. The median age was 48.3 years.

The median income for a household in the county was $42,794 and the median income for a family was $53,750. Males had a median income of $36,689 versus $24,883 for females. The per capita income for the county was $22,200. About 7.2% of families and 9.8% of the population were below the poverty line, including 10.9% of those under age 18 and 15.2% of those age 65 or over.

== Communities ==
=== Cities ===
- Armour (county seat)
- Corsica
- Delmont

=== Census-designated places ===
- Greenwood Colony
- Harrison
- New Holland

=== Unincorporated community ===
- Joubert

=== Townships ===
- Belmont
- Chester
- Clark
- East Choleau
- Garfield
- Grandview
- Holland
- Independence
- Iowa
- Joubert
- Lincoln
- Valley
- Walnut Grove
- Washington

=== Ghost towns ===
- Douglas City
- Flensburg
- Grand View
- Huston
- Maitland

== Politics ==
Douglas County voters have long been reliably Republican. In only two national elections since 1892 has the county selected the Democratic Party candidate.

United States presidential election results for Douglas County, South Dakota
Year	Republican		Democratic		Third party(ies)	
Year	No.	%	No.	%	No.	%
1892	541	50.85%	109	10.24%	414	38.91%
1896	533	58.06%	380	41.39%	5	0.54%
1900	649	52.85%	567	46.17%	12	0.98%
1904	859	61.89%	499	35.95%	30	2.16%
1908	836	55.99%	647	43.34%	10	0.67%
1912	0	0.00%	714	47.41%	792	52.59%
1916	815	57.48%	597	42.10%	6	0.42%
1920	1,247	63.49%	386	19.65%	331	16.85%
1924	1,125	50.25%	317	14.16%	797	35.60%
1928	1,949	68.68%	879	30.97%	10	0.35%
1932	1,045	34.08%	2,005	65.39%	16	0.52%
1936	1,418	44.75%	1,680	53.01%	71	2.24%
1940	1,977	65.53%	1,040	34.47%	0	0.00%
1944	1,483	67.35%	719	32.65%	0	0.00%
1948	1,301	63.71%	736	36.04%	5	0.24%
1952	2,103	79.93%	528	20.07%	0	0.00%
1956	1,713	67.81%	813	32.19%	0	0.00%
1960	2,002	78.73%	541	21.27%	0	0.00%
1964	1,189	50.86%	1,149	49.14%	0	0.00%
1968	1,613	70.68%	592	25.94%	77	3.37%
1972	1,434	61.68%	887	38.15%	4	0.17%
1976	1,315	57.30%	975	42.48%	5	0.22%
1980	1,855	75.31%	508	20.63%	100	4.06%
1984	1,713	76.00%	536	23.78%	5	0.22%
1988	1,438	67.23%	695	32.49%	6	0.28%
1992	1,175	56.85%	481	23.27%	411	19.88%
1996	1,210	63.38%	524	27.45%	175	9.17%
2000	1,311	76.71%	363	21.24%	35	2.05%
2004	1,596	79.32%	393	19.53%	23	1.14%
2008	1,293	73.63%	424	24.15%	39	2.22%
2012	1,334	78.93%	332	19.64%	24	1.42%
2016	1,338	83.36%	214	13.33%	53	3.30%
2020	1,468	86.00%	216	12.65%	23	1.35%
2024	1,419	85.59%	219	13.21%	20	1.21%

== Education ==
School districts include:

- Armour School District 21-1
- Corsica-Stickney School District 21-3
- Parkston School District 33-3
- Platte-Geddes School District 11-5
- Tripp-Delmont School District 33-5

== See also ==
- National Register of Historic Places listings in Douglas County, South Dakota
