= Armour, South Dakota =

- City
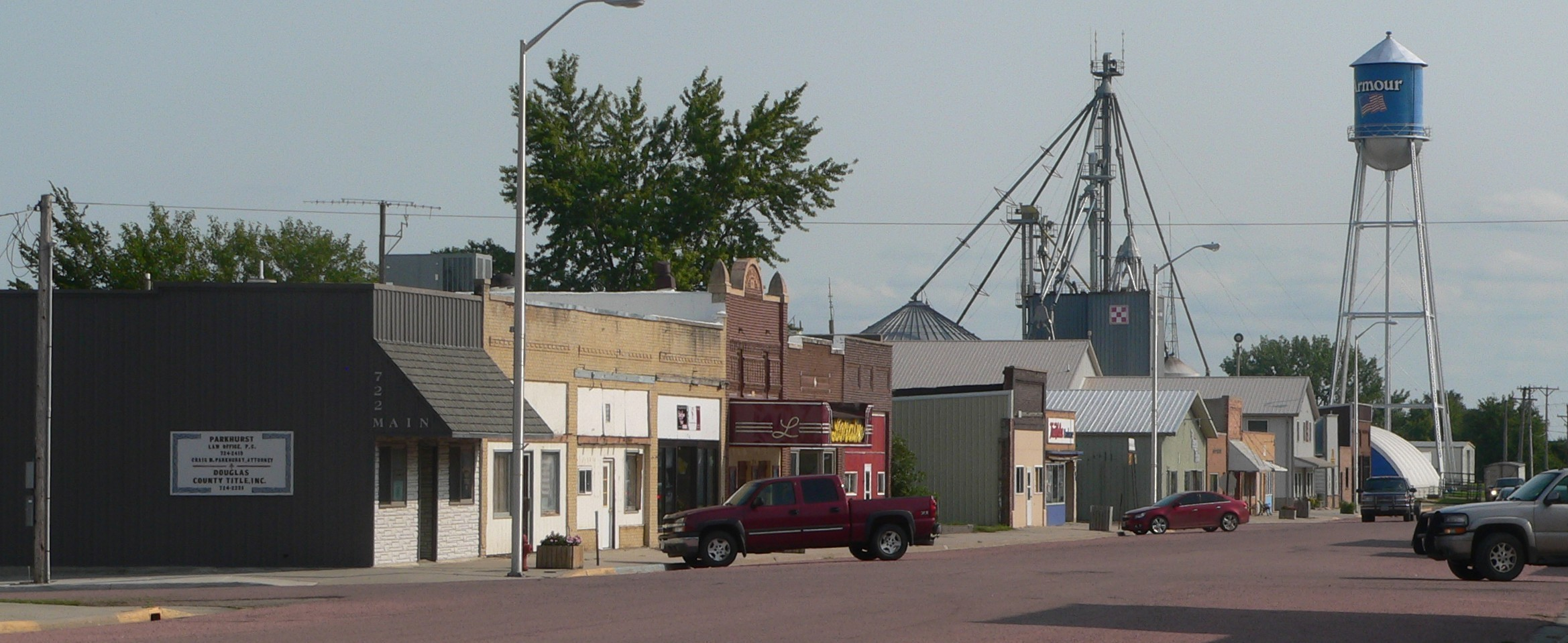
- Downtown Armour: Main Street

- Location in Douglas County and the state of South Dakota
- Coordinates: 43°19′08″N 98°20′41″W
- Country: United States
- State: South Dakota
- County: Douglas
- Incorporated: 1904

Area
  - Total: 0.95 sq mi (2.47 km^{2})
  - Land: 0.95 sq mi (2.45 km^{2})
  - Water: 0.0077 sq mi (0.02 km^{2})
- Elevation: 1,519 ft (463 m)

Population (2020)
  - Total: 698
  - Density: 739.1/sq mi (285.36/km^{2})
- Time zone: UTC-6 (Central (CST))
  - Summer (DST): UTC-5 (CDT)
- ZIP code: 57313
- Area code: 605
- FIPS code: 46-02260
- GNIS feature ID: 1267268
- Website: www.armoursd.com

Armour is a city in and the county seat of Douglas County, South Dakota, United States. The population was 698 at the 2020 census.

== History ==
Armour was founded in 1885. The city was named after Philip Danforth Armour, who was the founder of Armour and Company, a meat packing company. Contrary to popular belief, Armour was never home to a meat packing plant; the town was so named because Mr. Armour was also the chairman of the railroad that went through Armour and donated a bell to the local congregational church. The athletic teams of Armour High School were formerly known as the "Packers" in reference to the well known packing company, although today the high school plays its sports jointly with Tripp-Delmont High School as the "Armour/Tripp-Delmont Nighthawks."

== Geography ==
According to the United States Census Bureau, the city has a total area of 0.95 square miles (2.46 km^{2}), of which 0.94 square miles (2.43 km^{2}) is land and 0.01 square miles (0.03 km^{2}) is water.

=== Climate ===
This climatic region is typified by large seasonal temperature differences, with warm to hot (and often humid) summers and cold (sometimes severely cold) winters. According to the Köppen Climate Classification system, Armour has a humid continental climate, abbreviated "Dfa" on climate maps.

Climate data for Armour, South Dakota
Month	Jan	Feb	Mar	Apr	May	Jun	Jul	Aug	Sep	Oct	Nov	Dec	Year
Mean daily maximum °C (°F)	−1 (30)	2 (35)	8 (46)	17 (62)	23 (73)	28 (83)	32 (90)	31 (88)	26 (78)	19 (66)	8 (47)	1 (34)	16 (61)
Mean daily minimum °C (°F)	−14 (7)	−11 (12)	−6 (22)	2 (35)	8 (47)	14 (57)	17 (62)	16 (60)	10 (50)	3 (38)	−4 (24)	−11 (13)	2 (35)
Average precipitation mm (inches)	15 (0.6)	18 (0.7)	36 (1.4)	61 (2.4)	81 (3.2)	99 (3.9)	71 (2.8)	71 (2.8)	56 (2.2)	38 (1.5)	23 (0.9)	15 (0.6)	580 (23)
Source: Weatherbase

== Demographics ==
Historical population
Census	Pop.	Note	%±
1890	482		—
1900	912		89.2%
1910	968		6.1%
1920	1,045		8.0%
1930	1,009		−3.4%
1940	1,013		0.4%
1950	900		−11.2%
1960	875		−2.8%
1970	925		5.7%
1980	819		−11.5%
1990	854		4.3%
2000	782		−8.4%
2010	699		−10.6%
2020	698		−0.1%

=== 2020 census ===
As of the 2020 census, Armour had a population of 698. The median age was 51.2 years. 20.3% of residents were under the age of 18 and 30.5% of residents were 65 years of age or older. For every 100 females there were 93.9 males, and for every 100 females age 18 and over there were 89.1 males age 18 and over.

0.0% of residents lived in urban areas, while 100.0% lived in rural areas.

There were 290 households in Armour, of which 22.8% had children under the age of 18 living in them. Of all households, 50.7% were married-couple households, 18.6% were households with a male householder and no spouse or partner present, and 26.2% were households with a female householder and no spouse or partner present. About 34.8% of all households were made up of individuals and 20.0% had someone living alone who was 65 years of age or older.

There were 356 housing units, of which 18.5% were vacant. The homeowner vacancy rate was 0.4% and the rental vacancy rate was 21.8%.

Racial composition as of the 2020 census
Race	Number	Percent
White	623	89.3%
Black or African American	2	0.3%
American Indian and Alaska Native	19	2.7%
Asian	0	0.0%
Native Hawaiian and Other Pacific Islander	1	0.1%
Some other race	11	1.6%
Two or more races	42	6.0%
Hispanic or Latino (of any race)	30	4.3%

=== 2010 census ===
As of the census of 2010, there were 699 people, 325 households, and 181 families residing in the city. The population density was 743.6 inhabitants per square mile (287.1/km^{2}). There were 378 housing units at an average density of 402.1 per square mile (155.3/km^{2}). The racial makeup of the city was 95.7% White, 2.7% Native American, 0.3% Asian, and 1.3% from two or more races. Hispanic or Latino of any race were 0.6% of the population.

There were 325 households, of which 20.6% had children under the age of 18 living with them, 49.5% were married couples living together, 3.7% had a female householder with no husband present, 2.5% had a male householder with no wife present, and 44.3% were non-families. 41.5% of all households were made up of individuals, and 28% had someone living alone who was 65 years of age or older. The average household size was 2.02 and the average family size was 2.72.

The median age in the city was 52.4 years. 18.5% of residents were under the age of 18; 4% were between the ages of 18 and 24; 15.5% were from 25 to 44; 28.2% were from 45 to 64; and 33.8% were 65 years of age or older. The gender makeup of the city was 46.1% male and 53.9% female.

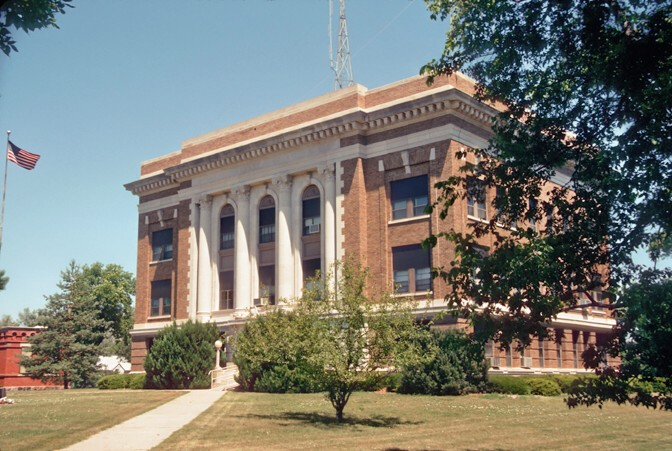
The Douglas County Courthouse in Armour 1995

=== 2000 census ===
As of the census of 2000, there were 782 people, 342 households, and 215 families residing in the city. The population density was 828.9 inhabitants per square mile (320.0/km^{2}). There were 377 housing units at an average density of 399.6 per square mile (154.3/km^{2}). The racial makeup of the city was 98.08% White, 0.77% Native American, 0.13% from other races, and 1.02% from two or more races. Hispanic or Latino of any race were 0.64% of the population.

There were 342 households, out of which 26.3% had children under the age of 18 living with them, 56.4% were married couples living together, 5.0% had a female householder with no husband present, and 37.1% were non-families. 35.7% of all households were made up of individuals, and 21.3% had someone living alone who was 65 years of age or older. The average household size was 2.16 and the average family size was 2.79.

In the city, the population was spread out, with 22.0% under the age of 18, 3.6% from 18 to 24, 21.4% from 25 to 44, 22.4% from 45 to 64, and 30.7% who were 65 years of age or older. The median age was 48 years. For every 100 females, there were 87.1 males. For every 100 females age 18 and over, there were 79.4 males.

The median income for a household in the city was $28,438, and the median income for a family was $41,797. Males had a median income of $27,500 versus $18,897 for females. The per capita income for the city was $15,829. About 8.8% of families and 12.6% of the population were below the poverty line, including 18.4% of those under age 18 and 12.4% of those age 65 or over.

== Education ==
It is in the Armour School District 21-1.

== Notable people ==
- Benjamin H. Adams, Rear Admiral and medical officer in the United States Navy
- Philip Danforth Armour, meatpacking industrialist who founded the Chicago-based firm of Armour and Company
- Peirson M. Hall, federal judge born in Armour
- Edwin S. Johnson, United States Senator buried in Armour
- Emily St. James, novelist, television writer and former critic-at-large at Vox, born in Armour
- Tony Venhuizen, Lieutenant Governor of South Dakota, born in Armour

== See also ==
- List of cities in South Dakota
