= Delmont, South Dakota =

- City
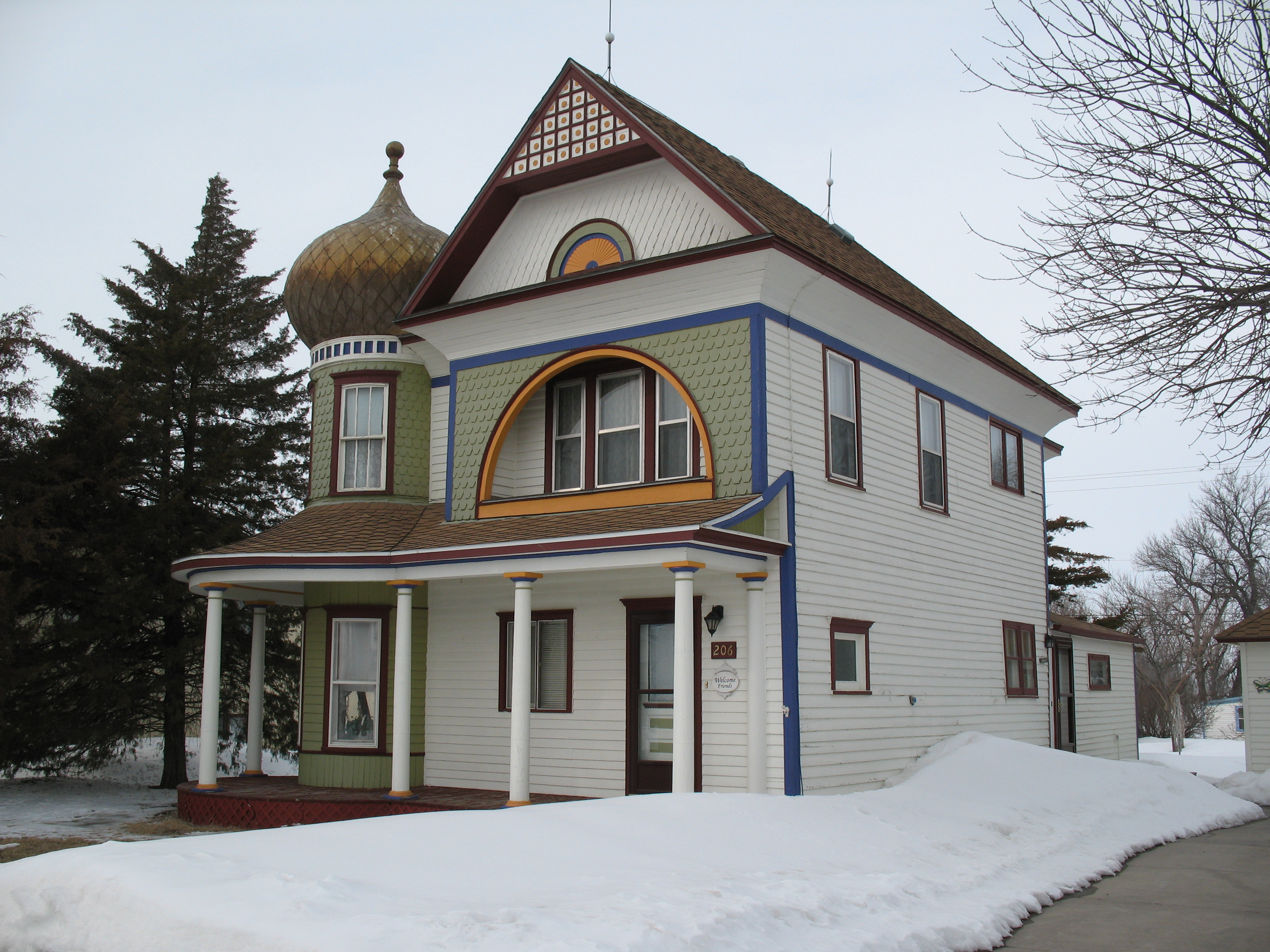
- The Onion House in Delmont

- Location in Douglas County and the state of South Dakota
- Coordinates: 43°16′00″N 98°09′33″W
- Country: United States
- State: South Dakota
- County: Douglas
- Incorporated: 1913

Area
  - Total: 0.76 sq mi (1.98 km^{2})
  - Land: 0.76 sq mi (1.98 km^{2})
  - Water: 0 sq mi (0.00 km^{2})
- Elevation: 1,480 ft (450 m)

Population (2020)
  - Total: 153
  - Density: 200.5/sq mi (77.42/km^{2})
- Time zone: UTC-6 (Central (CST))
  - Summer (DST): UTC-5 (CDT)
- ZIP code: 57330
- Area code: 605
- FIPS code: 46-16060
- GNIS feature ID: 1267352

Delmont is a city in southeastern Douglas County, South Dakota, United States. The population was 153 at the 2020 census.

Delmont was laid out in 1886.

The Onion House, named for his onion shaped metallic dome and located in Delmont, is listed on the list of National Register of Historic Places since 1987. Also included on the same historic marker is Bluebird Locker, a local business in Delmont known for its “Delmont Sausage” but also serves as a butchery for other types of meats.

== Geography ==
According to the United States Census Bureau, the city has a total area of 0.76 square miles (1.97 km^{2}), all land.

== Demographics ==
Historical population
Census	Pop.	Note	%±
1910	369		—
1920	518		40.4%
1930	472		−8.9%
1940	461		−2.3%
1950	405		−12.1%
1960	363		−10.4%
1970	260		−28.4%
1980	290		11.5%
1990	235		−19.0%
2000	263		11.9%
2010	234		−11.0%
2020	153		−34.6%
U.S. Decennial Census

=== 2020 census ===
As of the 2020 census, Delmont had a population of 153 and a median age of 53.3 years. 24.2% of residents were under the age of 18 and 29.4% of residents were 65 years of age or older. For every 100 females there were 112.5 males, and for every 100 females age 18 and over there were 110.9 males age 18 and over.

There were 75 households in Delmont, of which 13.3% had children under the age of 18 living in them. Of all households, 37.3% were married-couple households, 33.3% were households with a male householder and no spouse or partner present, and 25.3% were households with a female householder and no spouse or partner present. About 52.0% of all households were made up of individuals and 25.3% had someone living alone who was 65 years of age or older. There were 91 housing units, of which 17.6% were vacant. The homeowner vacancy rate was 3.1% and the rental vacancy rate was 27.8%.

0.0% of residents lived in urban areas, while 100.0% lived in rural areas.

Racial composition as of the 2020 census
Race	Number	Percent
White	138	90.2%
Black or African American	0	0.0%
American Indian and Alaska Native	6	3.9%
Asian	0	0.0%
Native Hawaiian and Other Pacific Islander	0	0.0%
Some other race	0	0.0%
Two or more races	9	5.9%
Hispanic or Latino (of any race)	1	0.7%

=== 2010 census ===
At the 2010 census, there were 234 people, 110 households and 61 families residing in the city. The population density was 307.9 per square mile (118.9/km^{2}). There were 141 housing units at an average density of 185.5 per square mile (71.6/km^{2}). The racial make-up was 83.3% White, 3.0% African American, 9.0% Native American, 1.7% from other races, and 3.0% from two or more races. Hispanic or Latino of any race were 3.4% of the population.

There were 110 households, of which 22.7% had children under the age of 18 living with them, 46.4% were married couples living together, 5.5% had a female householder with no husband present, 3.6% had a male householder with no wife present, and 44.5% were non-families. 37.3% of all households were made up of individuals, and 19.1% had someone living alone who was 65 years of age or older. The average household size was 2.13 and the average family size was 2.87.

The median age was 50.7 years. 20.5% of residents were under the age of 18; 6.4% were between the ages of 18 and 24; 15.8% were from 25 to 44; 34.2% were from 45 to 64; and 23.1% were 65 years of age or older. The gender makeup of the city was 53.4% male and 46.6% female.

=== 2000 census ===
At the 2000 census, there were 263 people, 114 households and 68 families residing in the city. The population density was 345.7 per square mile (133.5/km^{2}). There were 133 housing units at an average density of 174.8 per square mile (67.5/km^{2}). The racial make-up was 91.63% White, 7.60% Native American, 0.38% Asian, and 0.38% from two or more races. Hispanic or Latino of any race were 0.76% of the population.

There were 114 households, of which 26.3% had children under the age of 18 living with them, 50.9% were married couples living together, 6.1% had a female householder with no husband present, and 39.5% were non-families. 35.1% of all households were made up of individuals, and 18.4% had someone living alone who was 65 years of age or older. The average household size was 2.31 and the average family size was 3.04.

25.1% of the population were under the age of 18, 6.1% from 18 to 24, 22.8% from 25 to 44, 24.3% from 45 to 64, and 21.7% who were 65 years of age or older. The median age was 43 years. For every 100 females, there were 90.6 males. For every 100 females age 18 and over, there were 89.4 males.

The median household income was $23,750 and the median family income was $33,000. Males had a median income of $24,583 and females $16,667. The per capita income was $12,385. About 18.2% of families and 19.6% of the population were below the poverty line, including 20.7% of those under the age of eighteen and 17.5% of those 65 or over.

== May 2015 tornado and aftermath ==
On 10 May 2015, Delmont was hit by a strong EF2 tornado. It cut a path through the western side of town, destroying many homes and buildings. The destruction included Zion Lutheran Church, which was more than a century old. Governor Dennis Daugaard declared a state of emergency and alerted the National Guard to help with clean-up efforts. Despite the scale of the damage, only nine people were injured and no one was killed. In June 2015, the mayor said that half of the town's residents would not come back and rebuild. According to the 2020 census, the population declined to 153 from 234 in 2010, a decline of 34.6%, which is a smaller decline than anticipated.

A new Zion Lutheran Church was later rebuilt close to the site of the damaged building and dedicated in August 2017. Several parts of the previous building including the altar were saved and used in the new building.

== Education ==
It is in the Tripp-Delmont School District 33-5.

== See also ==
- List of cities in South Dakota
