= Lyman (name) =

The name Lyman has several origins including as an English topographical name, a Dutch name derived from a Germanic personal name, and an Americanized name derived from the German Leimann or Leinemann. Notable people with the name include:

== Given name ==
- Lyman Abbott (1835–1922), American theologian and author
- Lyman E. Barnes (1855–1904), American politician
- Lyman K. Bass (1836 – 1889), American politician
- Lyman M. Bass (1876 - 1955), American lawyer and U.S. Attorney for the Western District of New York
- Lyman Frank Baum (1856–1919), American author of The Wonderful Wizard of Oz and its sequels
- Lyman Beecher (1775–1863), Presbyterian clergyman and leader of the temperance movement
- Lyman Bostock (1950–1978), American baseball player
- Lyman Bostock Sr. (1918–2005), American baseball player
- Lyman Drake (1852–1932), American baseball player
- Lyman Duff (1865–1955), eighth Chief Justice of Canada
- Lyman W. Emmons (1885–1955), American businessman and politician
- Lyman J. Gage (1836–1927), American financier and Presidential Cabinet officer
- Lyman Gilmore (1874–1951), aviation pioneer
- Lyman Hall (1724–1790), a signer of the Declaration of Independence
- Lyman H. Howe (1856–1923), American film entrepreneur
- Lyman E. Johnson (1811–1859), American leader in the Latter-Day Saint movement
- Lyman T. Johnson (1906–1997), American educator and influential leader of racial desegregation in Kentucky
- Lyman Lamb (1895–1955), American baseball player
- Lyman Lemnitzer (1899–1988), U.S. Army general
- Lyman Linde (1920–1995), American baseball player
- Lyman Page (born 1957), American astrophysicist
- Lyman Smith (American football) (born 1956), American football player
- Lyman Bradford Smith (1904–1997), American botanist
- Lyman Cornelius Smith (1850–1910), American industrialist
- Lyman Spitzer (1914–1997), American theoretical physicist
- Lyman Tremain (1819–1878), New York politician
- Lyman Truman (1806–1881), New York state senator
- Lyman Trumbull (1813–1896), United States senator from Illinois during the American Civil War and impeachment of Andrew Johnson
- Lyman Walker (1799–1886), American politician
- Lyman Ward (actor) (born 1941), Canadian actor
- Lyman W. White (1858–1910), American politician
- Lyman White (born 1959), former American football player
- Lyman Wight (1796–1858), an early leader in the Latter Day Saint movement
- Lyman Young (1893–1984), American cartoonist

== Surname ==
- Abe Lyman (1897–1957), American musician
- Amasa Lyman (1813–1877), an early leader in the Latter-Day Saint movement
- Arthur Lyman (1932–2002), Hawaiian musician
- Bernard Lyman, the co-founder of Lyman Brothers Boat Builders and Lyman Boat Works
- Cam Lyman (1932–1995), American dog breeder
- Chester Smith Lyman (1814–1890), American teacher, clergyman and astronomer
- David Belden Lyman (1803–1884), missionary and founder of Hilo, Hawaii boarding school
- Dorothy Lyman (born 1947), American actress, director, and producer
- Edwin Lyman, American 20th-21st century physicist
- Esther Lyman (1927–1991), All-American Girls Professional Baseball League player
- Ethel Louise Lyman (1893–1974), American music librarian
- Francis M. Lyman (1840–1916), member of the Quorum of the Twelve Apostles of The Church of Jesus Christ of Latter-Day Saints (LDS Church)
- Hannah Lyman (1816-1871), American educator, biographer
- Henry Herbert Lyman (1854–1914), Canadian businessman and entomologist
- Jeff Lyman (born 1950), American football player
- Joe Lyman, rugby league footballer
- John Lyman (American football) (fl. 1889–1894), American college football player and coach
- John Lyman (athlete) (1912–1989), American shot putter
- John Goodwin Lyman (1886–1967), American-Canadian painter
- Joseph Lyman (1840–1890), Civil War soldier, lawyer, and judge; in the 1880s, a two-term Republican congressman
- Mark Lyman, founding director of Sculpture Objects Functional Art and Design (SOFA) art fairs
- Mel Lyman (1938–1978), American musician and preacher
- Monty Lyman (born 1992), British medical doctor and author
- Paul Lyman (born 1965), English rugby league footballer
- Peter Lyman (1940–2007), American professor of information science
- Princeton Lyman (1935–2018), American diplomat
- Richard M. Lyman (1893–1978), American politician
- Richard R. Lyman (1870–1963), apostle in The Church of Jesus Christ of Latter-Day Saints (LDS Church)
- Richard Wall Lyman (1923–2012), American educator and historian, seventh president of Stanford University
- Rufus Anderson Lyman (1842–1910), judge and planter from Hawaii
- Samuel Lyman (1749–1802), Congressman from Massachusetts
- Sheila Lyman, American politician
- Shelby Lyman (1936–2019), American chess player
- Stanford Lyman (1933–2003), American sociologist
- Theodore Lyman I (1753–1839), American merchant and shipbuilder
- Theodore Lyman II (1792–1849), American philanthropist, politician, and author
- Theodore Lyman III (1833–1897), American natural scientist, Civil War Union Army lieutenant colonel, and Congressman from Massachusetts
- Theodore Lyman IV (1874–1954), American physicist and discoverer of the Lyman series
- Will Lyman (born 1948), American actor
- William Whittingham Lyman Jr. (1885–1983), also known as Jack Lyman, American writer and academic, primarily in the field of Celtic studies
- William Lyman (congressman) (1755–1811), Congressman from Massachusetts
- William R. Lyman ("Link" Lyman, 1898–1972), American football player

== Characters ==
- Lyman, an early Garfield comic character
  - Lyman, a character from Gnorm Gnat, also by Jim Davis
- James Lyman, from the Battlestar Galactica: The Resistance webseries
- Josh Lyman, on The West Wing television program
- Lyman Slime, the carnival villain from Marvin the Tap-Dancing Horse, a Canadian animated children's TV series

== See also ==
- Lyman (disambiguation)
- Justice Lyman (disambiguation)
- Senator Lyman (disambiguation)
- Lynam (disambiguation), a surname
