= Caonillas River =

River of Puerto Rico

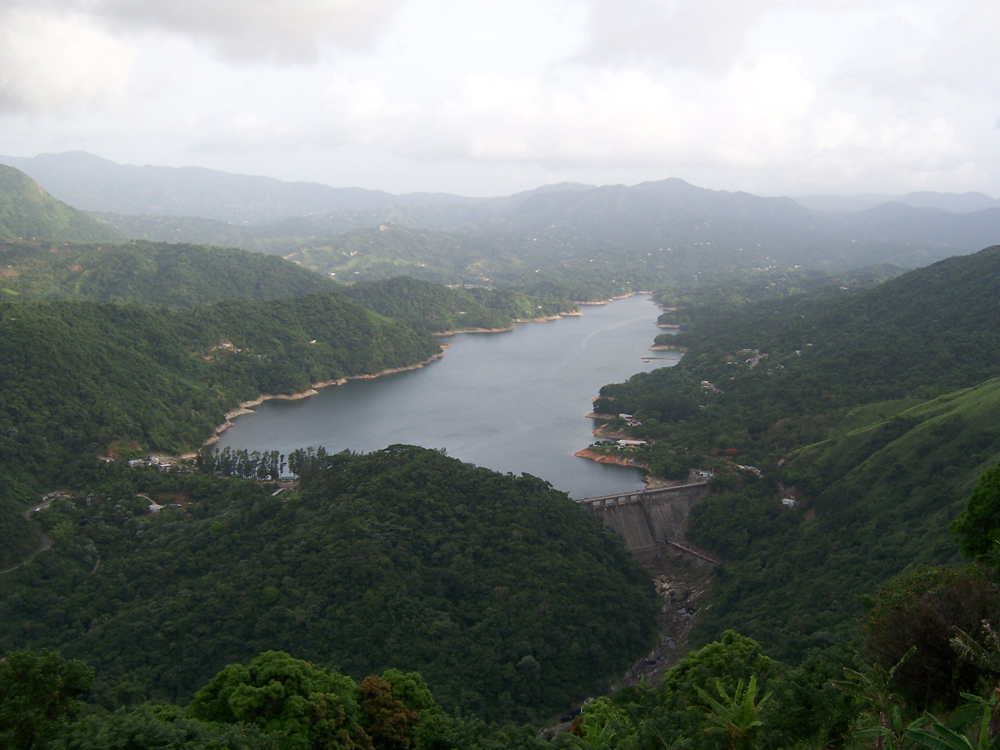
- View of the Caonillas Lake, a reservoir of the Caonillas River.
- Etymology: From Spanish "caonillas", plural diminutive of the Taíno word "caona" meaning 'gold'.
- Native name: Río Caonillas (Spanish)

Location
- Commonwealth: Puerto Rico
- Municipality: Utuado

Physical characteristics
- Source
  - location: Meeting of the Jauca and Jayuya Rivers in Paso Palma, Utuado
- Mouth
  - location: Dos Bocas Lake in Río Arriba, Arecibo
  - coordinates: 18.3330063°N 66.6657295°W
  - elevation: 299 ft.

Basin features
- Tributaries
  - right: Limón River

The Caonillas River (Spanish: Río Caonillas) is a tributary of the Arecibo River (Río Grande de Arecibo) that flows through the municipality of Utuado, Puerto Rico.

== Geography ==
The Caonillas River originates at the confluent head of the Jauca and Jayuya (Grande de Jayuya) rivers in Paso Palma barrio of Utuado. From there it traverses into the Utuado Pluton, a large mass of Late Cretaceous intrusive igneous rock, creating a canyon notable for its white granodiorite and tonalite walls. This area is now aptly known as the White Canyon of the Caonillas (Cañón Blanco de Caonillas), notable for its soft white rocks and its depth that adds notable orographic prominence to the Cerro Morales, which is located immediately northeast of the river. The river then leads into the Caonillas Lake, a reservoir dammed by the Caonillas Dam, from where it flows north towards Dos Bocas Lake as it receives Limón River at the eastern arm of the latter reservoir.

== Recreation ==
The area of the Cañón Blanco is popular for swimming and diving. The canyon also attracts visitors due to its scenic value and the number of indigenous petroglyphs that can be found in the area.

Since its inception in 1948, fishing at Lake Caonillas has also served a secondary recreational purpose in addition to its use to generate hydroelectric energy. The Puerto Rico National Parks Company (Compañía de Parques Nacionales de Puerto Rico) developed the area further by opening the Caonillas Vacation Center (Centro Vacacional Caonillas), a recreational area that included room rentals, camping and picnic areas. This establishment has however remained closed since Hurricane Maria in 2017.

== See also ==
- List of rivers of Puerto Rico
