= Limon =

Limon or limón, Spanish for "lemon", may refer to:

== Places ==
- Limón Province, Costa Rica
  - Limón (canton), a canton in the province
  - Limón or Puerto Limón, the capital city of both the canton and province
- Roman Catholic Diocese of Limón, Costa Rica
- Limon, Nièvre, a commune in the Nièvre department of France
- Limón, Honduras, a municipality in the department of Colón
- Limón, Panama, a subdistrict
- Bahía Limón, Panama
- Río Limón, Panama, a river
- Limon, Colorado, a Statutory Town in the United States
  - Limon Correctional Facility, Colorado, a correctional facility in the above city
- Limón, Mayagüez, Puerto Rico, a barrio
- Limón, Utuado, Puerto Rico, a barrio
- Limón River, Venezuela

== People ==
- Ada Limón (born 1976), American poet
- Carlos Madrazo Limón (born 1952), Mexican politician
- Donald Limon (1932–2012), British public servant, Clerk of the House of Commons from 1994 to 1997
- Emilio Limón (born 1988), Surinamese footballer
- Graciela Limón (born 1938), Latina novelist
- Harvey Limón (born 1975), Surinamese footballer
- Iyari Limon (born 1976), American actress
- Javier Limón (born 1973), Spanish record producer, singer and songwriter
- José Limón (1908–1972), Mexican-born American modern dancer and choreographer
- María Limón, American Chicana writer, poet and activist
- Marshall Limon (1915–1965), Canadian sprinter
- Martin Limón (born 1948), American novelist
- Michele Limon, Italian research associate and assistant professor of physics and astronomy
- Monique Limon (born 1953), French politician
- Monique Limón (born 1979), American politician
- Mordechai Limon (1924–2009), fourth commander of the Israeli navy
- Rafael Limón (born 1954), Mexican boxer
- Richarte Limón, English explorer and conquistador, participated in the founding of Buenos Aires
- Theodolinda Hahnsson (1838–1919), née Limón, Finnish writer and translator, first known female author to write in Finnish
- Limon Staneci (1916–1991), journalist born in Yugoslavia

== Other uses ==
- Limón F.C., a football team in Puerto Limón, Costa Rica
- MV Limon, a ferry scrapped in 2005

== See also ==
- El Limón (disambiguation)
- Limón Group, a geologic group in Costa Rica
- State v. Limon, a Kansas Supreme Court case
- Limons, France, a commune
- Lymon (disambiguation)
