= John Lyman =

John Lyman is the name of:

- John Lyman (athlete) (1912–1989), American shot putter
- John Lyman (American football) (?–?), American collegiate football coach
- John Goodwin Lyman (1886–1967), American-Canadian painter

== See also ==
- Lyman (disambiguation)
