= Río Grande de Arecibo =

River of Puerto Rico

Arecibo River
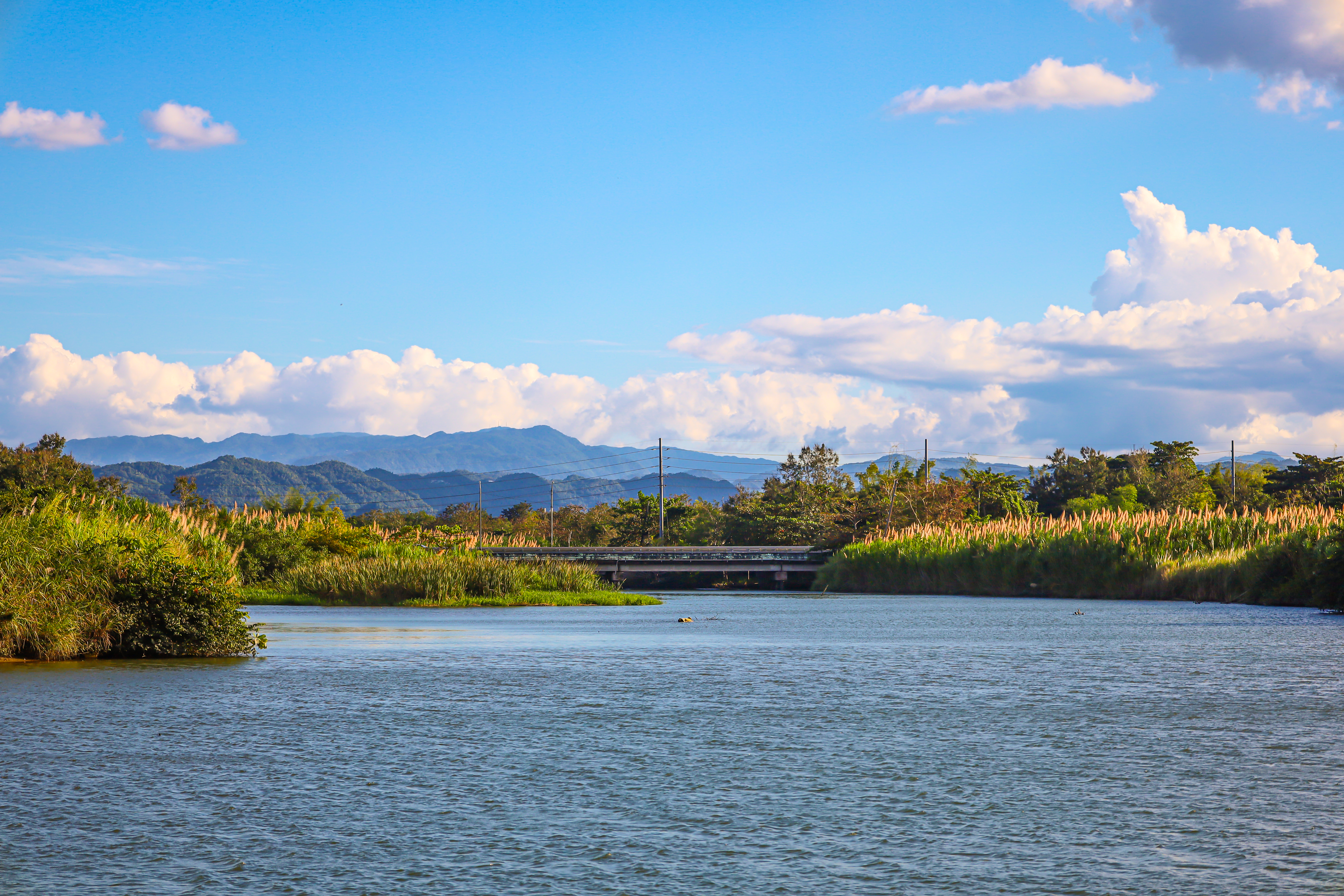
- Río Grande de Arecibo
- Etymology: After the town of Arecibo, itself named after the Taíno cacique Arasibo and/or Taíno "arasiba" possibly meaning 'people's stone'.
- Native name: Río Grande de Arecibo (Spanish)

Location
- Commonwealth: Puerto Rico
- Municipality: Arecibo, Utuado

Physical characteristics
- Source
  - location: Garzas Lake in Adjuntas
  - coordinates: 18°28′22″N 66°42′38″W
- Mouth
  - location: Arecibo Bay in the Atlantic Ocean near Arecibo Pueblo
- Length: 52.89 km (32.86 mi)

Basin features
- Tributaries
  - left: Caguana River, Jobos Creek, Tanamá River
  - right: Júa Creek, Caonillas River, Limón River, Vacas River

The Río Grande de Arecibo (also gazetted as Arecibo River in English) is a river of Puerto Rico. The Arecibo River is the fourth longest and second largest in discharge in Puerto Rico, after the Loíza River. It flows north-northeast. Its headwaters lie in the mountains to the south of Adjuntas, from there it flows northward, passing along a gorge that is 200 m deep and 800–1,200 m wide, until it reaches the Atlantic Ocean near Arecibo Pueblo. The tributaries lie along the north side of the Cerro de Punta and the Utuado Pluton.

The tributaries to Río Grande de Arecibo basin include the Vacas, Pellejas, Garzas, Saltillo, Cidra, Grande de Jayuya, Caguana, Caonillas, Yunés, Limón, Jauca, Tanamá and Santiago rivers.

== Flood control project ==
In mid 2018, the United States Army Corps of Engineers announced it would be undertaking a major flood control project of the river, with a budget of $82.9 million.

In mid 2021, funding was appropriated for work on the Río Grande de Arecibo, including work to improve the natural habitat of local species, including the Puerto Rican crested toad and a Río Grande de Arecibo canalization project was set to begin in 2023.

== Gallery ==
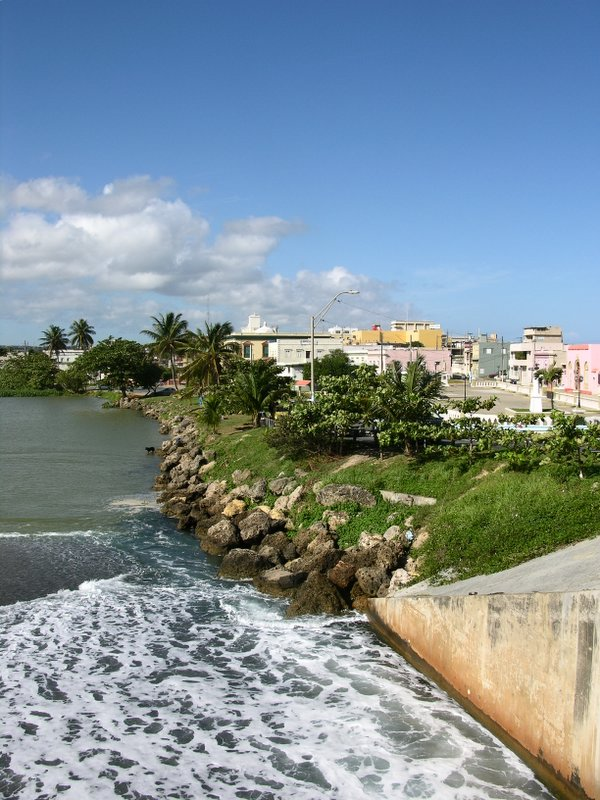
View of Arecibo Pueblo from the mouth of the river

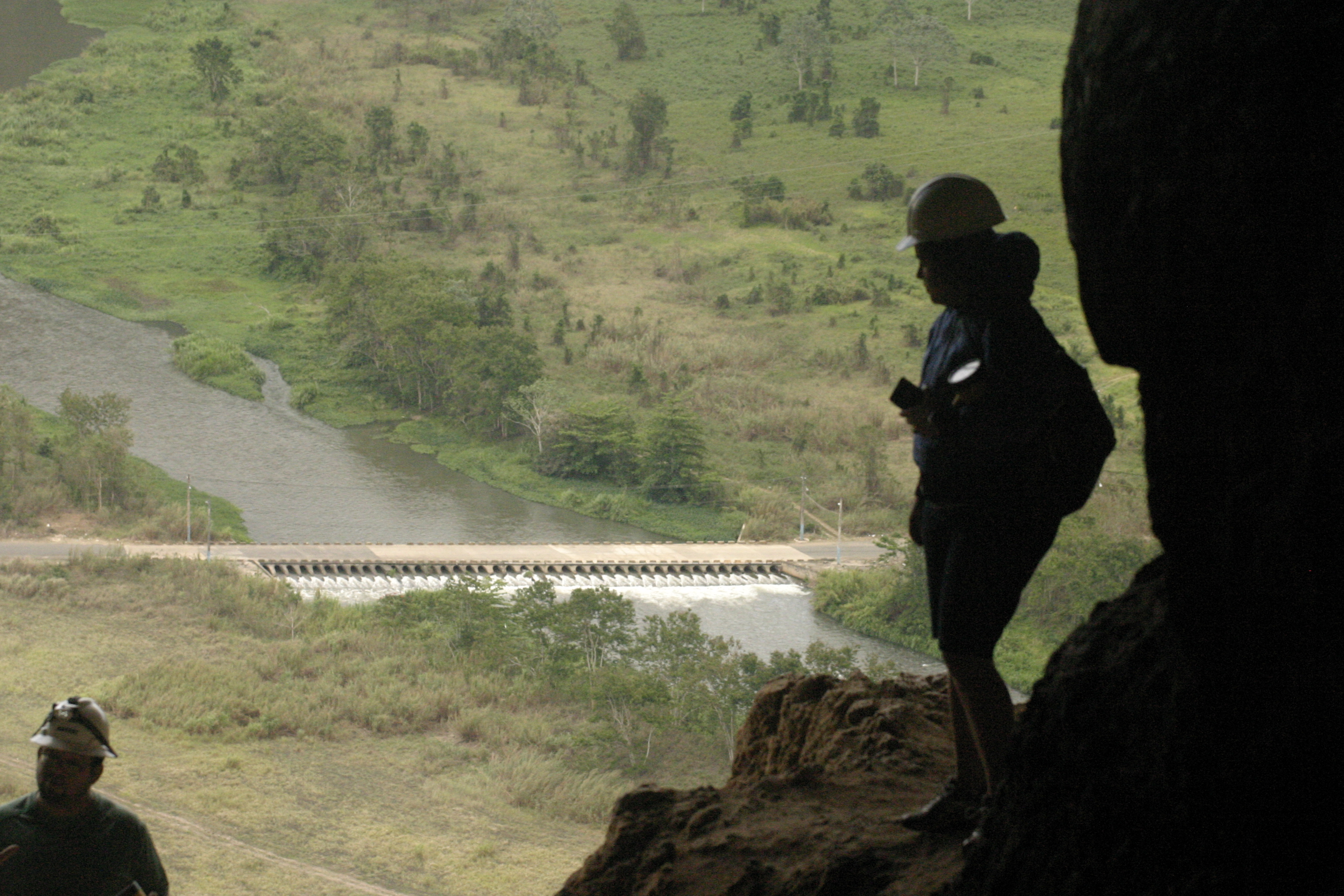
View of the river from Cueva Ventana

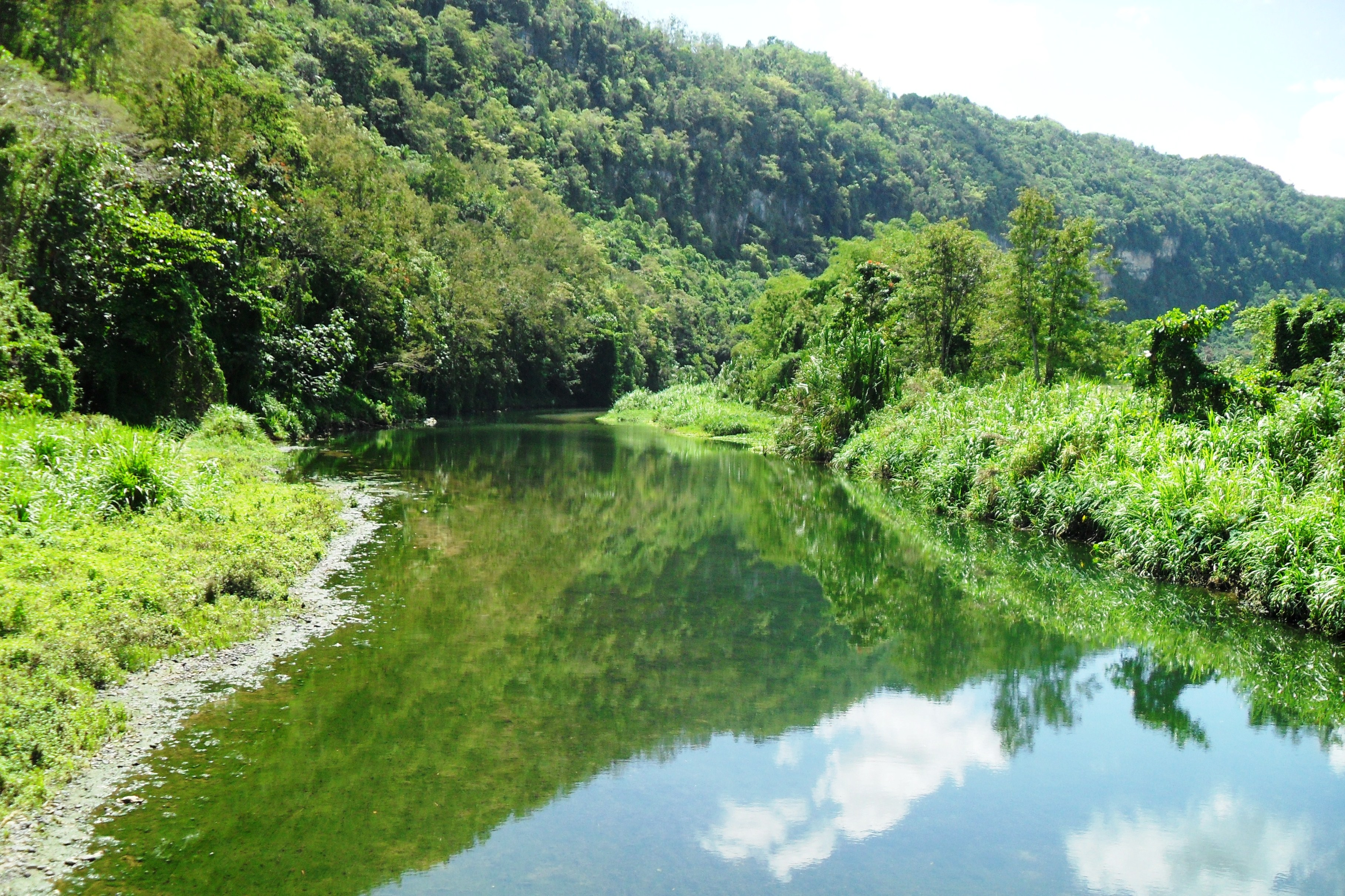
Arecibo River in the Northern Karst Belt

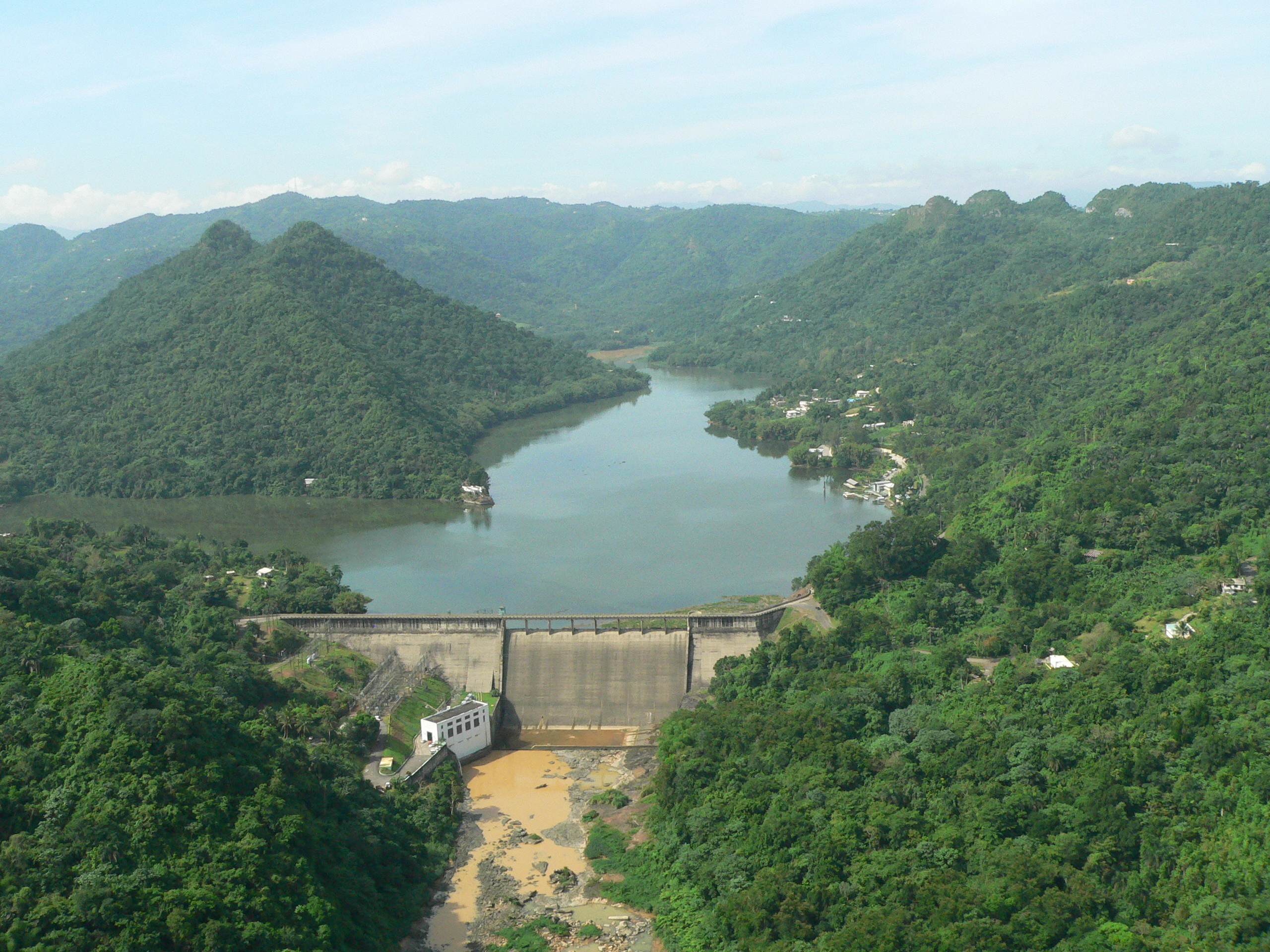
Dos Bocas Lake, a reservoir of the river between Arecibo and Utuado

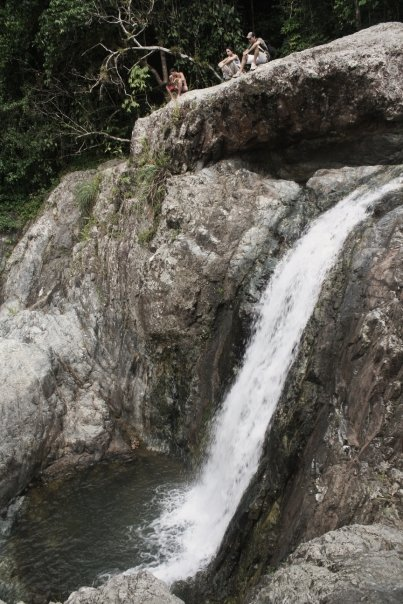
El Ataúd falls in Adjuntas

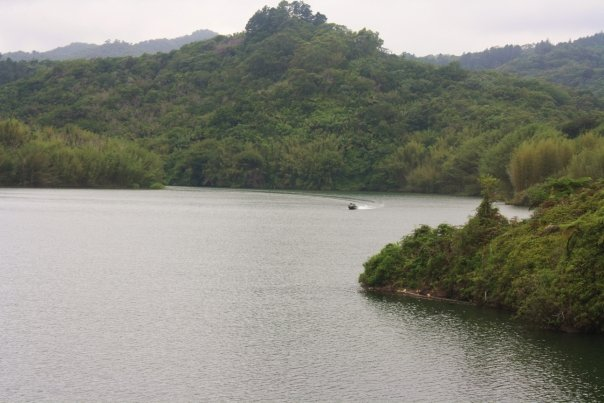
Garzas Lake, a reservoir of the river in Adjuntas

== See also ==
- Cambalache Bridge: NRHP listing in Arecibo, Puerto Rico
- List of rivers of Puerto Rico
