= Henry Lyman =

Henry Lyman may refer to:

- Henry Lyman (poet), American poet, editor, translator
- Henry Lyman (missionary), American Baptist missionary
- Henry H. Lyman, American politician from New York
- Henry Herbert Lyman, Canadian businessman and amateur entomologist
