= Lyman =

Lyman may refer to:

== Places ==
=== Ukraine ===
- Lyman, Ukraine, a city, formerly the administrative center of Lyman Raion, Donetsk Oblast
- Lyman Raion, Donetsk Oblast, a former raion (district)
- Lyman Raion, Odesa Oblast, a former raion

=== United States ===
- Lyman, Iowa, an unincorporated community
- Lyman, Maine, a town
- Lyman, Mississippi, a census-designated place
- Lyman, Nebraska, a village
- Lyman, New Hampshire, a town
- Lyman, Oklahoma, a town
- Lyman, South Carolina, a town
- Lyman County, South Dakota
  - Lyman, South Dakota, an unincorporated community in the county
- Lyman, Utah, a town
- Lyman, Washington, a town
- Lyman, Wyoming, a town
- Lyman Glacier (Mount Adams), Gifford Pinchot National Forest, Washington state
- Lyman Glacier (North Cascades), Wenatchee National Forest, Washington state
- Lyman Mountain, Oregon
- Lyman Reservoir, Arizona

=== Outer space ===
- Lyman (crater), a lunar impact crater

== Other uses ==
- Lyman (name), a list of people and fictional characters with the given name or surname
- USS Lyman, a World War II destroyer escort
- Lyman High School (disambiguation), various American high schools
- Lyman School for Boys, Westborough, Massachusetts, US, a school from c. 1884 to c. 1971

== See also ==
- Lyman series of hydrogen spectral lines in physics
- Lyman Block, Brockton, Massachusetts US, a historic commercial building
- Lyman House (disambiguation), various American houses
- Lyman Terrace, Lincoln, Nebraska, US, a historic apartment building
- Lyman Viaduct, Colchester, Connecticut, US, a buried railroad trestle
- Battle of Lyman (September–October 2022), between Russia and Ukraine
- John Lyman Book Awards, given annually by the North American Society for Oceanic History
- Liman (disambiguation)
- Lymon (disambiguation)
