= Lyman Johnson =

Lyman Johnson is the name of:

- Lyman E. Johnson (1811–1859), American leader in the Latter Day Saint movement
- Lyman T. Johnson (1906–1997), American educator and influential leader of racial desegregation in Kentucky

== See also ==
- Lyman (disambiguation)
