= USS Sedgwick County =

Tank landing ship

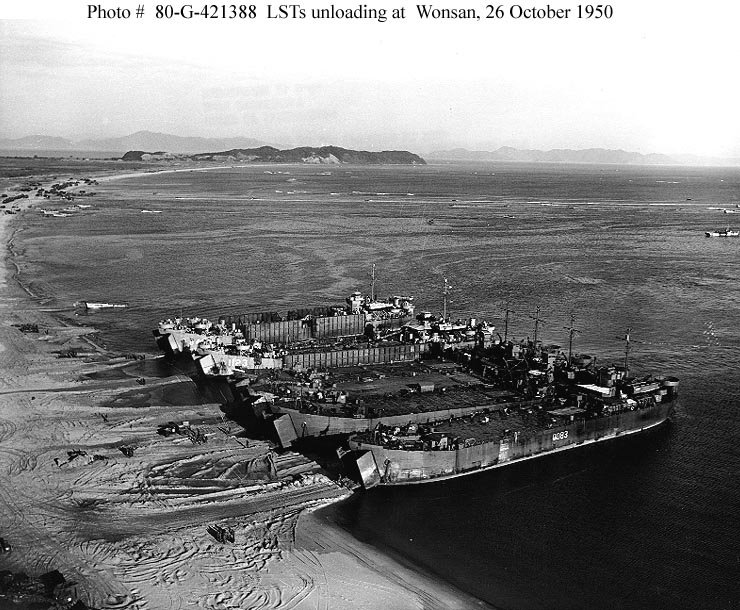
- INSERT ALTTEXT HERE

History

United States
- Name: USS LST-1123
- Builder: Chicago Bridge & Iron Company; Seneca, Illinois
- Laid down: 1 November 1944
- Launched: 29 January 1945
- Sponsored by: Miss Betty Lou Bailey
- Commissioned: 19 February 1945
- Renamed: USS Sedgwick County (LST-1123), 1 July 1955
- Decommissioned: 9 September 1955
- Recommissioned: 4 June 1966
- Decommissioned: 6 December 1969
- Stricken: 15 March 1975
- Honors and awards: 6 battle stars, Korean War; 6 battle stars, Vietnam War; 1 Meritorious Unit Commendation, Vietnam War
- Fate: Transferred to Malaysia, 7 October 1976

Malaysia
- Name: KD Rajah Jarom (A-1502)
- Acquired: 7 October 1976
- Commissioned: 1 August 1976
- Decommissioned: 9 September 1999
- Status: Retired
- Badge

General characteristics
- Class & type: LST-542-class LST
- Displacement: 1,490 tons (light); 4,080 tons (full load of 2,100 tons)
- Length: 328 ft (100 m)
- Beam: 50 ft (15 m)
- Draft: 8 ft (2.4 m) forward; 14 ft 4 in (4.37 m) aft (full load)
- Propulsion: Two diesel engines, two shafts
- Speed: 10.8 knots (20 km/h) (max); 9 knots (17 km/h) (econ)
- Complement: 7 officers, 204 enlisted
- Armament: 8 × 40 mm guns; 12 × 20 mm guns

USS Sedgwick County (LST-1123) was an LST-542-class tank landing ship in the United States Navy. Unlike many of her class, which received only numbers and were disposed of after World War II, she survived long enough to be named. On 1 July 1955, all LSTs still in commission were named for US counties or parishes; LST-1123 was given the name Sedgwick County, after counties in Colorado and Kansas.

LST-1123 was laid down on 1 November 1944 at Seneca, Illinois, by the Chicago Bridge & Iron Company; launched on 29 January 1945, sponsored by Betty Lou Bailey; and commissioned on 19 February 1945.

== World War II and post-war service ==
Completing shakedown toward the end of March, LST-1123 loaded cargo at Mobile, Alabama, and sailed for the Pacific on the 29th. She arrived at San Diego in mid-April; transported rescue boats to San Francisco; and departed the latter port on the 22nd loaded with LVTs, vehicles, and fuel oil. On 2 May, she arrived at Pearl Harbor; offloaded her cargo; and then commenced amphibious exercises. On 2 June, with Army Quartermaster Corps and Navy Construction Battalion personnel and cargo embarked, she sailed for the Marshall Islands, Marianas, and Ryukyus.

Arriving off Okinawa on 28 July, she remained there until after the Japanese surrender, then returned to the Marshalls and Marianas. During September, she carried occupation troops from the latter islands to Kyūshū, Japan. Then, in late October and early November, she performed a similar service for units moving from the Philippines to Honshū.

On 9 November 1945, LST-1123 departed Honshu and sailed east. Steaming via the Marianas and the Hawaiian Islands, she arrived at San Francisco on 8 January 1946; underwent overhaul at Seattle; then commenced operations out of San Diego. For the next four years, the LST continued to ply the waters off the west coast, primarily in the California area, but with occasional cargo and training operations in Hawaiian and Alaskan waters.

In 1950, LST-1123 participated in the filming of the 1951 movie Halls of Montezuma, starring Richard Widmark. She appeared in the film.

== Korean War Service ==
In late June 1950, while LST-1123 was undergoing overhaul at San Francisco, the Army of North Korea crossed the 38th Parallel and pushed south to occupy most of the Republic of Korea (ROK). By the end of July, the LST had returned to San Diego; loaded Construction Battalion equipment at Port Hueneme; and sailed west.

At Yokosuka by the end of August, she shifted to Kobe; and, on 10 September, sailed for the embattled Korean peninsula to participate in the amphibious landing at Inchon. On the afternoon of the 15th, she anchored off Blue Beach and began launching LVTs under protective fire from the covering force. Then, she remained in the Inchon area into October, shuttling passengers and cargo from transports and cargo ships in the harbor.

On 15 October, she departed Inchon. Ten days later, she arrived off Wonsan and, as the 1st Marine Division was landed administratively on the Kalma peninsula, commenced shuttle operations similar to those at Inchon. From 1 November until 3 November, she transported ROK Marines to, and landed them at, Kosong; then shifted back to Wonsan.

By the 18th, U.S. Marines had reached the Chosin Reservoir; ROK forces were moving on Chongjin; and U.S. Army units were pushing toward North Korea's northern borders. Hungnam had been chosen as a new supply center, and LST-1123 was ordered to carry tanks and other vehicles to that port.

On 28 November, she headed back to Japan, whence she returned to the west coast of Korea. From 5 December 1950 until 7 January 1951, she remained in the Inchon area, then carried troops and cargo to Taechon. At mid-month, she returned to Yokosuka. In February, she carried POW's from Pusan to Koje Do. In March, she continued operations in the Pusan area and, in early April, she returned to Yokosuka, whence she got underway for California on the 25th.

Arriving at San Diego on 23 May, LST-1123 conducted local operations through the remainder of the year. During the winter of 1952, she underwent overhaul at San Francisco; and, on 26 May, got underway to return to the Far East. On 30 June, she arrived at Yokosuka; shifted to Sasebo at the end of the month; and, by 2 August, was back in Pusan harbor to start her second tour in the Korean combat zone.

Shuttle runs to Japan and to Pongam Do occupied the first part of the month. She then returned to Japan and, into October, conducted training exercises. On 10 October, she sailed for Korea. On the 15th, she participated in an amphibious feint at Kojo; and, on the 17th, she returned to Japan. By the 20th, she was back at Inchon, whence, into late November, she carried ammunition to U.N.-held offshore islands.

LST-1123 spent December at Yokosuka; and, in January 1953, she steamed back to Inchon. From there she sailed to Pusan; made cargo runs to Kojo Do and back to Inchon; then proceeded to Yokosuka, whence she sailed for San Diego, arriving there on 5 March.

For the remainder of 1953, LST-1123 operated off the west coast. In January 1954, she again sailed for the Far East. She delivered landing craft and vehicles to Yokosuka in late February; conducted amphibious exercises in the Volcano Islands in March, off Korea in April, and in Japanese waters in July. During those months and through September, she also carried cargo between Japanese and Korean ports. In October, she sailed for home.

After her arrival on 10 November, LST-1123 operated off the west coast into 1955. That spring, she began inactivation at Astoria; and, in the summer, she returned to San Diego. Named Sedgwick County on 1 July 1955, she was decommissioned on 9 September and berthed with the Reserve Fleet.

== Vietnam War Service ==
Sedgwick County remained berthed at San Diego until recommissioned on 4 June 1966. Assigned to Landing Ship Squadron 3 and homeported at Guam, she was ordered west in November for her first tour in her third western Pacific war. On her arrival in South Vietnamese waters, Sedgwick County began carrying troops, cargo, and ammunition to Allied forces on the coast and in the Mekong Delta area. In late December 1966 and early January 1967, she supported Operation Deckhouse V in the Mekong Delta area; then, from 2 to 13 January, she again conducted shuttle runs between Da Nang, Chu Lai and Cửa Việt Base. At mid-month, she headed for home; but, on 20 February, she departed Guam and headed west again. Early March was spent at Kaohsiung, Taiwan; and, on the 11th, the LST returned to Da Nang to resume shuttle runs. Continuing resupply operations into April, she was back at Guam from 3 May to 5 June; but, by mid-June, she was again off the Vietnamese coast.

On the 12th, Sedgwick County arrived at Vũng Tàu, whence she resupplied ships conducting Operation Market Time. On 8 July, she anchored in Subic Bay for two weeks rest, then returned to Da Nang and cargo runs for the Naval Support Activity there. Her duties were interrupted at the end of August for a call at Hong Kong. She then returned to Subic Bay and Da Nang, resumed resupply shuttle operations, and continued them until late in December.

Christmas 1967 was spent at Kaohsiung; but with the new year, 1968, the LST returned to Vietnam. During January, she resupplied Cửa Việt. Upkeep at Subic and a call at Hong Kong took her into February; and, at mid-month, she began supporting riverine forces from Vung Tau.

On 4 April, the LST returned to Guam for overhaul. In June, she conducted exercises in Japanese waters. In July, she returned to the Philippines; and, on 18 August, she resumed support of Market Time activities in South Vietnam as CTU 115.3.9. Relieved by USS Litchfield County in late September, Sedgwick County moved north to Da Nang; loaded a causeway section; then steamed for Subic and Guam. Arriving on 17 October, she sailed for Da Nang on 20 November to shuttle cargo to Cửa Việt and Tan My. In late December, she headed for Hong Kong, thence, at the end of the year, continued on to Sasebo, Japan, for an extended upkeep period.

In mid-April 1969. Sedgwick County returned to South Vietnam and began a tour as support and re-supply LST for the Naval Support Activity, Saigon. During June and early July, she was in the Philippines; and, on 13 July, she returned to Da Nang to join in operations to redeploy Marines from Vietnam. On 6 August, she completed her second run from Vietnam to Okinawa; and, on the 8th, she headed for Guam.

Arriving on the 14th, Sedgwick County prepared for inactivation. She was decommissioned on 6 December 1969; and, in 1970, preparations were made to tow her to Vallejo, California, for berthing with the Pacific Reserve Fleet at Mare Island. She was struck from the Navy list on 15 March 1975 and transferred to the Royal Malaysian Navy on 7 October 1976 where she served as KD Rajah Jarom (A-1502).

LST-1123 earned six battle stars for the Korean War and six battle stars and one award of the Meritorious Unit Commendation for the Vietnam War.

== KD Raja Jarom ==
The ship was transferred to the Royal Malaysian Navy on 1 August 1976, and renamed KD Raja Jarom (A-1502). She was retired on 9 September 1999.
