= Lyman House =

Lyman House may refer to the following houses in the United States:

By state, then city/town

- Lyman House (Asylum Hill, Connecticut), listed on the National Register of Historic Places (NRHP) in Hartford County
- Thomas Lyman House, Durham, Connecticut, listed on the NRHP in Middlesex County
- David Lyman II House, Middlefield, Connecticut, listed on the NRHP in Middlesex County
- Levi and Netti Lyman House, Hilo, Hawaii, listed on the NRHP in Hawaii County
- Lyman House Memorial Museum, Hilo, Hawaii, listed as the "Rev. D.B. Lyman House" on the NRHP in Hawaii County
- Lyman Scott House, Summer Hill, Illinois, listed on the NRHP in Pike County
- Lyman Trumbull House, Alton, Illinois, listed on the NRHP in Madison County
- Lyman Allen House and Barn, Amanda, Ohio, listed on the NRHP in Fairfield County
- William Lyman House, Madison, Ohio, listed on the NRHP in Lake County
- Lyman C. Joseph House, Middletown, Rhode Island, listed on the NRHP in Newport County
- William and Julia Lyman House, Parowan, Utah, listed on the NRHP in Iron County

== See also ==
- Lyman Estate, Waltham, Massachusetts, formerly known as "The Vale", a National Historic Landmark and listed on the NRHP in Middlesex County
- Wanton-Lyman-Hazard House, Newport, Rhode Island, a National Historic Landmark and listed on the NRHP in Newport County
