= USS LST-903 =

US tank landing ship

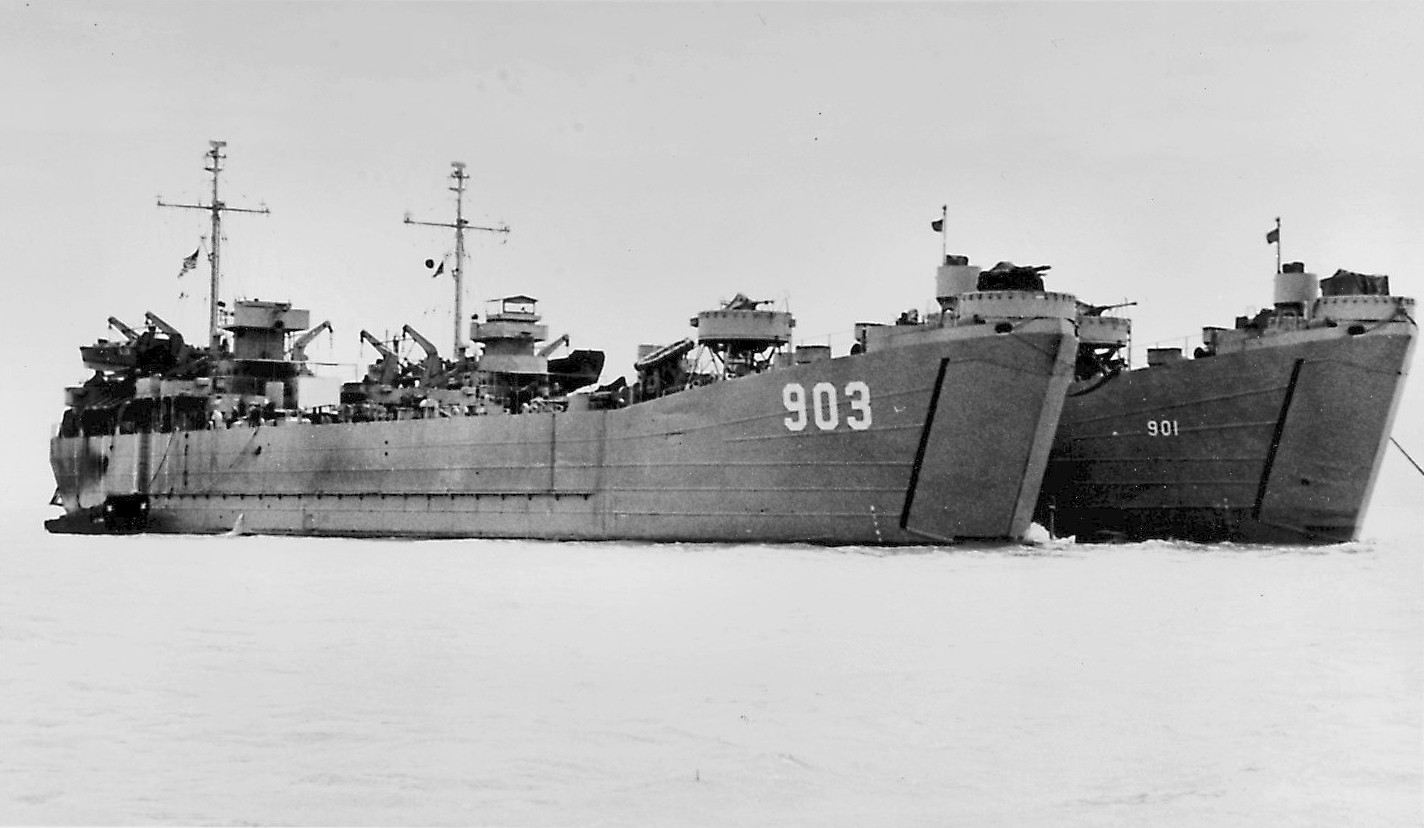
- LST-903 and USS LST-901 at anchor circa 1945-46

History

United States
- Name: USS LST-903
- Builder: Dravo Corporation, Neville Island, Pittsburgh
- Laid down: 15 October 1944
- Launched: 23 December 1944
- Commissioned: 20 January 1945
- Decommissioned: 10 September 1946
- Renamed: USS Lyman County (LST-903), 1 July 1955
- Stricken: 1 November 1958
- Fate: Sunk as a target, 28 March 1959

General characteristics
- Class & type: LST-542-class tank landing ship
- Displacement: 1,625 long tons (1,651 t) light; 3,640 long tons (3,698 t) full
- Length: 328 ft (100 m)
- Beam: 50 ft (15 m)
- Draft: Unloaded : 2 ft 4 in (0.71 m) forward; 7 ft 6 in (2.29 m) aft; Loaded : 8 ft 2 in (2.49 m) forward; 14 ft 1 in (4.29 m) aft
- Propulsion: 2 × General Motors 12-567 diesel engines, two shafts, twin rudders
- Speed: 12 knots (22 km/h; 14 mph)
- Boats & landing craft carried: 2 × LCVPs
- Troops: Approximately 130 officers and enlisted men
- Complement: 8-10 officers, 89-100 enlisted men
- Armament: 8 × 40 mm guns; 4 × 20 mm guns

USS Lyman County (LST-903) was an LST-542-class tank landing ship built for the United States Navy during World War II. Named after Lyman County, South Dakota, she was the only U.S. Naval vessel to bear the name.

Originally laid down as USS LST-903 by the Dravo Corporation of Pittsburgh, Pennsylvania on 15 October 1944; the ship was launched on 23 December 1944, sponsored by Mrs. E. W. Wilson; and commissioned at New Orleans, Louisiana on 20 January 1945.

== Service history ==
=== World War II, 1945 ===
After shakedown out of St. Andrews Bay, Florida LST-903 departed New Orleans on 21 February for the Pacific. Steaming via the Panama Canal and San Diego, she reached Pearl Harbor on 27 March. During the next seven weeks she participated in intensive amphibious training in Hawaiian waters; and, after embarking Army troops and loading LVTs, she sailed in convoy for the Marianas on 20 May. LST-903 steamed via Eniwetok, arrived Saipan on 10 June, and on 11 July departed on a supply run to Okinawa and Guam.

=== Post-war activities, 1945–1946 ===
At the conclusion of hostilities she was operating out of Saipan; thence from 23 to 29 August she steamed to Leyte Gulf for supply runs among the Philippine Islands. Between 20 September and 4 November she made two runs carrying occupation troops from Manila Bay, Luzon to Yokohama, Japan. Departing Japan on 11 November, she sailed via the Marianas and Pearl Harbor and reached San Diego on 31 December. LST-903 operated along the west coast during the next five months before reaching Puget Sound on 1 June 1946 for deactivation.

=== Decommissioning and disposal ===
She decommissioned at Vancouver, Washington on 10 September and entered the Pacific Reserve Fleet. Named USS Lyman County (LST-903) on 1 July 1955, she was designated a target ship on 20 October 1958. Her name was struck from the Naval Vessel Register on 1 November. On 28 March 1959 she was torpedoed by the Menhaden (SS-377) off the coast of Baja California and sank in 720 fathoms of water.
