= Lydman =

Lydman is a surname. Notable people with the surname include:

- Jack Wilson Lydman (1914–2005), American actor and ambassador
- Toni Lydman (born 1977), Finnish ice hockey player

== See also ==
- Lyman (name)
