= Lymon =

Lymon may refer to:

- Frankie Lymon (1942–1968), American singer and songwriter
- Selwyn Lymon (born 1986), American football wide receiver
- Lymon, a portmanteau of "lime" and "lemon" used to market the soft drink Sprite
- Lymon, a character in the 1951 novella The Ballad of the Sad Café by Carson McCullers
- Lymon, a character in the 1987 play The Piano Lesson by August Wilson

== See also ==
- Limon (disambiguation)
- Lyman (disambiguation)
