= Lyman High School =

Lyman High School may refer to:

- Lyman Memorial High School, Lebanon, Connecticut
- Lyman High School (Florida), Longwood, Florida
- Lyman High School (South Dakota), Presho, South Dakota
- Lyman High School (Wyoming), Lyman, Wyoming

== See also ==
- Lyman School for Boys, Westborough, Massachusetts, United States, a school from c. 1884 to c. 1971
- Lyman (disambiguation)
