= El Limón =

El Limón, Spanish for "the lemon", may refer to:

== Places ==
=== Dominican Republic ===
- El Limón, Independencia, a municipality in the province of Independencia
- El Limón, Samaná, a municipality in the province of Samaná
- El Limón, Santiago, a municipality in the province of Santiago

=== Mexico ===
- El Limón, Jalisco, a municipality in state of Jalisco
- El Limón, Tamaulipas, a municipality in state of Tamaulipas

=== Panama ===
- El Limón, Herrera

=== Venezuela ===
- El Limón, Venezuela, a city in the state of Aragua
- El Limón River

== People ==
- Alvaro de Jesús Agudelo, Pablo Escobar's driver, who was killed with Escobar
- Rafael Herbert Reyes, Dominican born professional wrestler

== See also ==
- Limón (disambiguation)
