= Iona, South Dakota =

- Unincorporated community
- Location within South Dakota Location within the United States
- Coordinates: 43°32′35″N 99°25′29″W
- Country: United States
- State: South Dakota
- County: Lyman
- Elevation: 1,808 ft (551 m)
- Time zone: UTC-6 (Central (CST))
  - Summer (DST): UTC-5 (CDT)
- ZIP code: 57542
- Area code: 605
- GNIS feature ID: 1255766

Iona is an unincorporated community in Lyman County, South Dakota, United States. Although not tracked by the Census Bureau, Iona has been assigned the ZIP code of 57542.

Iona is a Native American name meaning "fire around".
