= Ethel Louise Lyman =

American music librarian

- Lyman in 1947
- Born: December 1, 1893; Northampton, Massachusetts
- Died: November 17, 1974 (aged 80); Martinsville, Indiana
- Occupation: music librarian

Ethel Louise Lyman (December 1, 1893 - November 17, 1974) was a music librarian and cataloger known for creating the music library at Indiana University—now called the William & Gayle Cook Music Library—as well as the collections of several important music libraries.

== Career ==
Lyman worked as a public librarian in Northampton, notably the Forbes Library which had an extensive music collection and classification scheme which was created under Charles Ammi Cutter. She was eventually promoted to the head of the Fine Arts Department where she oversaw all of the music and art collections. She resigned from the Forbes in 1922 in order to take a position as music librarian at Smith College, the college's first music librarian. While at Smith, during her library school periods, she worked at Harvard's Widener Library, the Boston Public Library, the Brookline Public Library, and the New England Conservatory of Music Library. She also taught library science principles to Smith College students who worked in the library. During her tenure, she revised the entire music catalog and ensured that all books and scores were completely cataloged. In 1936, she took a year off for a sabbatical and conducted a survey of some fifty-three music libraries in the eastern United States. She worked at Smith College until 1938 when she left to do research for a book, and possibly as the result of a personality conflict.

Lyman took the job at Indiana University School of Music as their first music librarian in 1938. She expanded the library's budget and greatly increased their holdings, from "6,915 books, 9,880 musical scores, and 2,920 sound recordings" in 1942 to "44,567 books and bound periodicals, 137,840 scores, and 15,000 sound recordings" in 1958. She oversaw the creation of the Music Library Annex (later called the Record Room) which contained room for phonograph records, sheet music and unbound orchestra program notes. She retired from Indiana University in 1959 and was complimented on "fine service as the first and only Librarian that the School of Music has ever had."

== Professional associations ==
Lyman was very involved professionally. She was a member of the American Library Association, the Special Libraries Association, and the Ohio Valley Regional Catalogers Association. She was a founding member of the Music Library Association in 1931 and was the chair of its Midwest Chapter from 1949 through 1951. At an SLA meeting in 1940, she was a strong advocate for the classification and cataloging of phonograph records in the 1940s and shared a classification system she had created for records at Smith College that was still in use in the 21st century, a system which focused on classifying the music, not just the physical item.

== Personal life ==
Lyman was born on December 1, 1893, the only child of Elias Cornelius Lyman, a baker, and Elizabeth Mary Smith Lyman. She graduated from Northampton High School in 1912, studied abroad for a year learning French, German and Italian, and returned to attend Capen School for Girls where she continued her language studies. She took library science classes at Simmons College after beginning her job at Smith College.

When she lived in Indiana, she rented a small efficiency apartment in Bloomington in which she kept few objects of furniture besides her grand piano.

She died on November 17, 1974, in Martinsville, Indiana and is buried with her parents in Bridge Street Cemetery in Northampton, Massachusetts. She endowed the Ethel Louise Lyman Memorial Fund at Indiana University to be used for acquiring of musical scores for the collection.
