= Henry H. Lyman =

American politician

Henry Harrison Lyman (April 15, 1841 – May 4, 1901) was an American politician from New York.

== Life ==
Lyman was born on April 15, 1841, in Lorraine, New York, the son of War of 1812 veteran Colonel Silas Lyman.

Lyman grew up working on his father's farm and attending the district school. From 1856 to 1859, he attended the Pulaski Academy while teaching in schools during the winter. He made a special study of surveying and engineering in school, and he worked in that field from 1859 to 1862.

In August 1862, during the American Civil War, Lyman enrolled as a private in Company C of the newly created 147th New York Infantry Regiment. A month later, he was promoted to first sergeant of the company. In February 1863, he became second lieutenant. In January 1864, he was promoted to adjutant. He fought with his regiment in the Battles of Chancellorsville, Gettysburg, Haymarket, Mine Run, and the Wilderness. In the latter battle, he was taken prisoner. He was first sent to Salisbury, North Carolina, then to Macon, Georgia, for several months. He and other prisoners were transferred first to Charleston, then to Camp Sorghum in Columbia, where he suffered severe and prolonged illness. In March 1865, he was exchanged and rejoined with his regiment. In May 1865, he was mustered out and honorably discharged. In 1868, he was breveted major for bravery at Gettysburg. In 1866, Governor Reuben Fenton made him lieutenant-colonel of the New York National Guard to organize a second regiment in Oswego County. In 1868, when it was decided the National Guard should be reduced, the regiment was disbanded and he left the service.

After the war, Lyman began working in the hardware trade in Pulaski. He served as town supervisor of Richland from 1871 to 1872. He also served as village trustee. In 1873, he was elected sheriff of Oswego County and moved with his family to Oswego. After the end of his term as sheriff in 1877, he became deputy county clerk. In 1881, he was appointed deputy collector of the Port of Oswego, an office he held until 1885. He worked as superintendent of the Oswego Water Works Company from 1885 to 1889. In 1889, President Benjamin Harrison appointed him Collector of the Port of Oswego. He was also vice-president of the First National Bank of Oswego, trustee of the Oswego City Savings Bank, secretary and director of the Oswego Water Works Company, and a director of the Oswego Gas Company until its dissolution in 1900. He ran for political office as a Republican.

In 1895, when the Fish and Game Commission and the Forest Commission was consolidated into the Fisheries, Game and Forest Commission, he was appointed a member of the new Commission. While he only served on it for a year, he was credited with instituting reforms and establishing better methods for conducting its affairs. In 1896, when the Liquor Tax Law placed the state's excise matters under state control, Governor Levi P. Morton appointed him State Commissioner of Excise. As Commissioner, he managed to collect and turn over to the State and local treasuries over eleven million dollars in the department's first year of existence. Under him, the Excise Department came to raise over twelve million dollars a year in revenue. He was reappointed Commissioner shortly before his death, while he was on his sick bed.

Lyman attended the Episcopal Church. He was on a committee to locate regimental monuments upon the Gettysburg Battlefield, and at the dedication of the 147th New York Regiment he delivered the oration. He was also the orator at the unveiling of the John Brown monument at Lake Placid in 1896. He was also involved with the movement to locate the situs of the Battle of Bennington in New York instead of Vermont. He wrote two books: "The Old Homestead," about his early life, and "The Windward Islands," a narrative of travels in the West Indies. He was president of the Re-Union Association, 147th Regiment, N.Y.S.V. and an aide-de-camp in the Grand Army of the Republic. He was also a member of the Loyal Legion of the United States and the Freemasons. In 1862, he married Flora T. Clark of Pulaski. They had no children, and Flora died in 1866. In 1867, he married Emily V. Bennett of Pulaski. They had three daughters.

Lyman died at home following seven weeks of heart trouble on May 4, 1901. He was buried in Riverside Cemetery.
