= Lyman House (Asylum Hill, Connecticut) =

Historic house in Connecticut, United States

- U.S. National Register of Historic Places
- U.S. Historic district – Contributing property
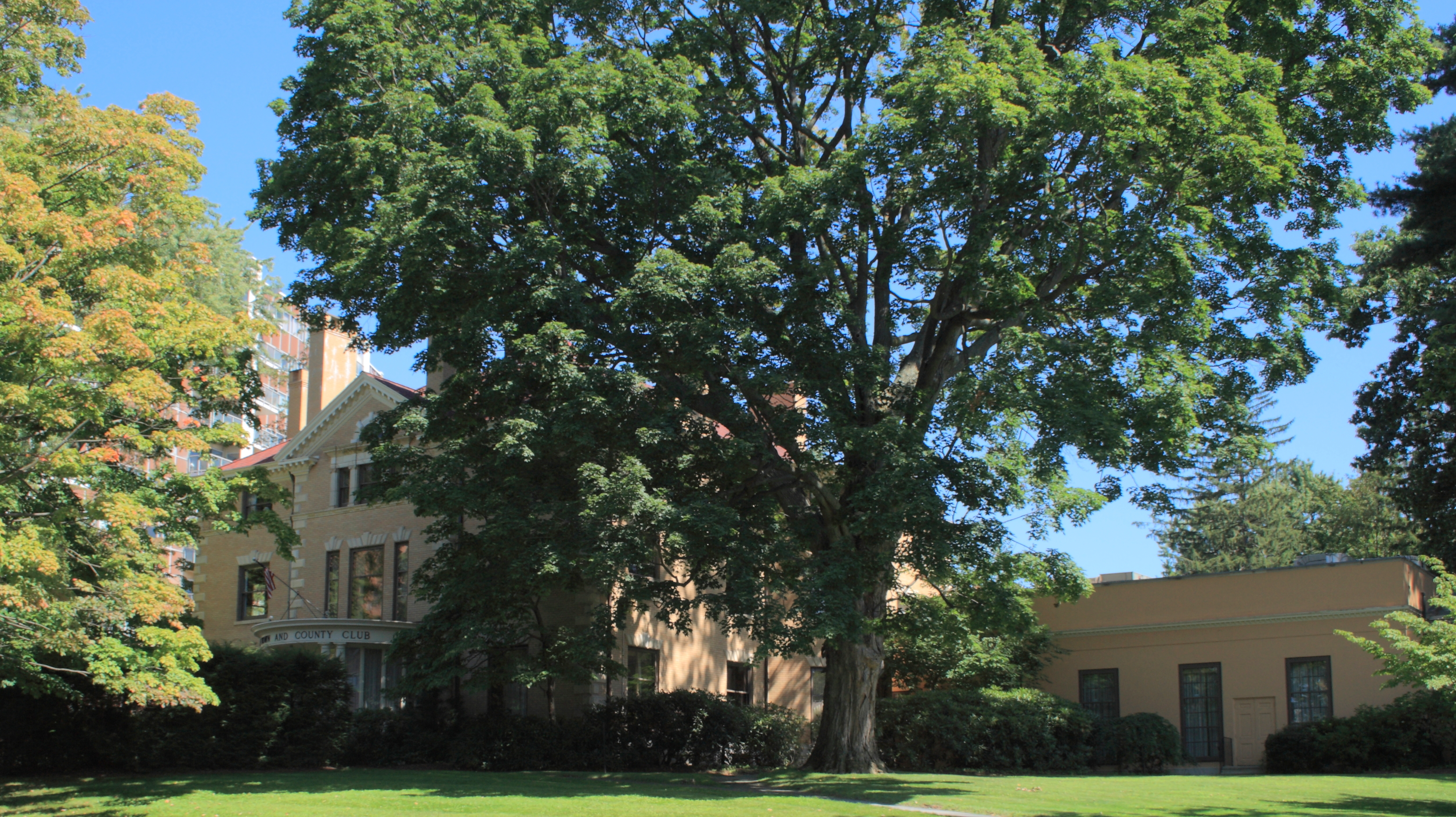

- Location within Connecticut Location within the United States
- Location: 22 Woodland Street, Hartford, Connecticut
- Coordinates: 41°46′8″N 72°42′8″W
- Area: less than one acre
- Built: 1895
- Architect: Hapgood, Melvin & Edward
- Architectural style: Federal Revival
- Part of: Nook Farm and Woodland Street District (ID79002674)
- NRHP reference No.: 75001938

Significant dates
- Added to NRHP: October 31, 1975
- Designated CP: November 29, 1979

The Lyman House is a historic house at 22 Woodland Street in Hartford, Connecticut. It was built in 1895 for Theodore Lyman, a prominent local lawyer and corporate director. Since 1925 it has been home to the Town and County Club, a private women's club. A well-preserved example of Classical Revival architecture, it was listed on the National Register of Historic Places in 1975.

== Description and history ==
The Lyman House is located in Hartford's Asylum Hill neighborhood, west of downtown. It is on the east side of Woodland Street, north of its junction with Farmington Avenue. It is a three-story masonry structure, built out of yellow brick with stone trim. Its corners have stone quoining, and it is covered by a hip roof from which six chimneys project. The main facade is three bays wide, with the center one projecting. Its corners are also quoined, and it is topped by a gable. A semicircular portico with Doric columns projects further, sheltering the main entrance; above it is a three-part window on the second floor, and a Palladian window with half-round top above that.

The house was built in 1895 for Theodore Lyman, a prominent local lawyer. Lyman died in 1920, and the house was bought by the Town and County Club in 1925, after his widow died. The house was designed by the Hartford firm of Hapgood & Hapgood, cousins who executed a number of prominent regional landmarks and the Connecticut State Building at the 1904 St. Louis Exposition. The principal alteration to the building has been the addition of a large meeting space to the rear in 1929–30. The house is one of the few high-profile mansions to survive in Asylum Hill, a fashionable address for the city elite in the late 19th century.

== See also ==
- National Register of Historic Places listings in Hartford, Connecticut
