= Lyman County, South Dakota =

County in South Dakota, United States

- County
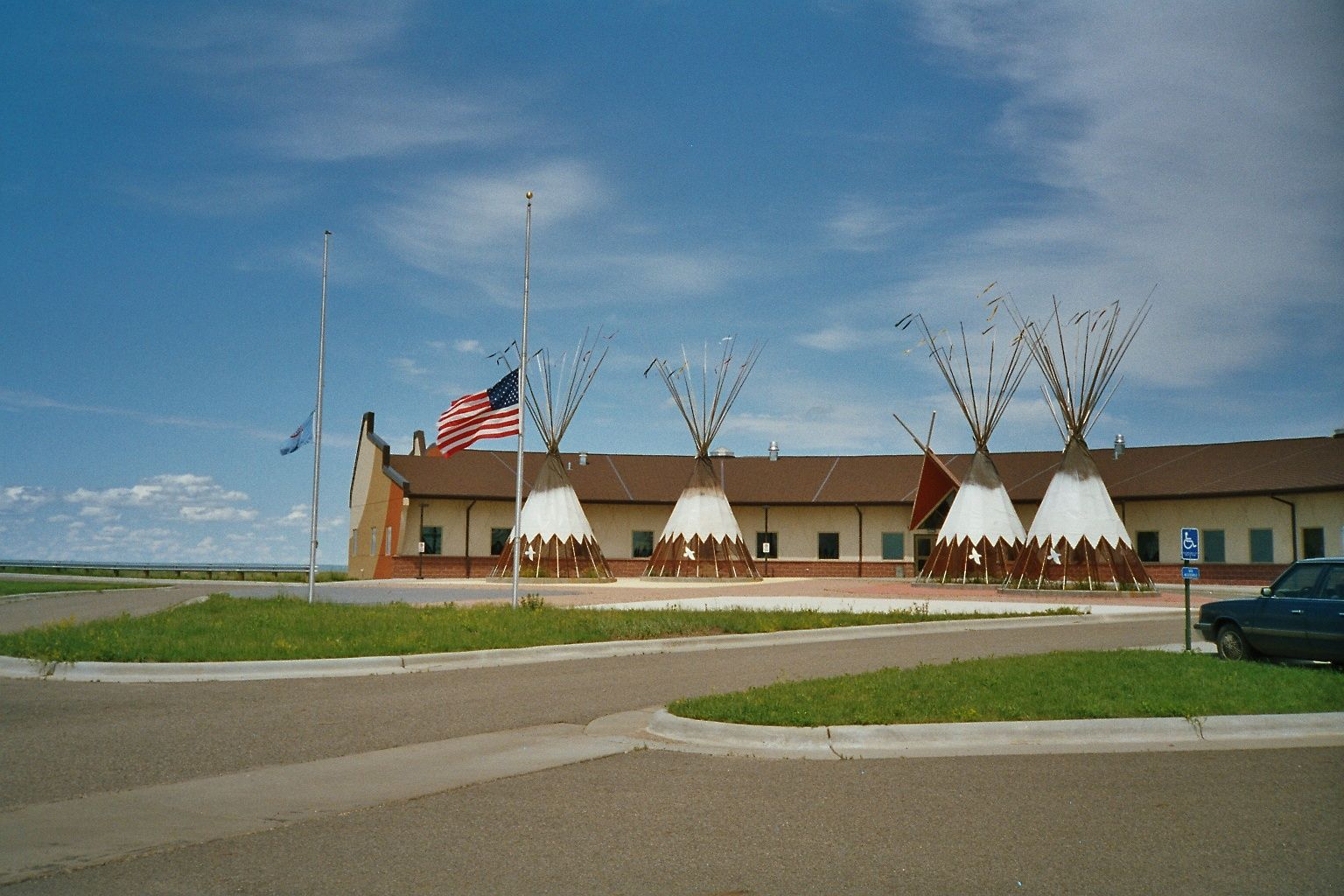
- Lower Brule Indian Reservation

- Location within the U.S. state of South Dakota
- Coordinates: 43°54′N 99°51′W
- Country: United States
- State: South Dakota
- Founded: 1893
- Named for: W. P. Lyman
- Seat: Kennebec
- Largest community: Lower Brule

Area
  - Total: 1,707 sq mi (4,420 km^{2})
  - Land: 1,642 sq mi (4,250 km^{2})
  - Water: 65 sq mi (170 km^{2}) 3.8%

Population (2020)
  - Total: 3,718
  - Estimate (2025): 3,694 ▼
  - Density: 2.264/sq mi (0.8743/km^{2})
- Time zone: UTC−6 (Central)
  - Summer (DST): UTC−5 (CDT)
- Congressional district: At-large
- Website: www.lymancounty.org

Lyman County is a county located in the U.S. state of South Dakota. As of the 2020 census, the population was 3,718. Its county seat is Kennebec.

Lyman County was created by the Dakota Territorial Legislature on January 8, 1873, but was not organized until May 21, 1893. Its boundaries were altered in 1891, 1897, 1898, and 1916. The county was named for W. P. Lyman, a politician.

== History ==
Lyman County was created in 1873 and organized in 1893. Oacoma served as its first county seat in 1891; in 1922 the seat was transferred to Kennebec.

== Geography ==
Lyman County is bordered on the north and east by the Missouri River, which flows southerly along its edge, and the western portion of its south line is also delineated by the White River, which then continued flowing eastward through the county's eastern area to discharge into the Missouri. Its upper central portion is drained by the Bad Horse Creek, which discharges into the Missouri near the midpoint of the county's north boundary.

The county terrain consists of rolling hills, sloping to the river drainages. Its area is largely devoted to agriculture. The county has a total area of 1,707 square miles (4,420 km^{2}), of which 1,642 square miles (4,250 km^{2}) is land and 65 square miles (170 km^{2}) (3.8%) is water.

=== Major highways ===
- Interstate 90
- U.S. Highway 83
- U.S. Highway 183
- South Dakota Highway 47
- South Dakota Highway 49
- South Dakota Highway 53
- South Dakota Highway 273
- South Dakota Highway 1806

=== Transit ===
- Jefferson Lines

=== Adjacent counties ===
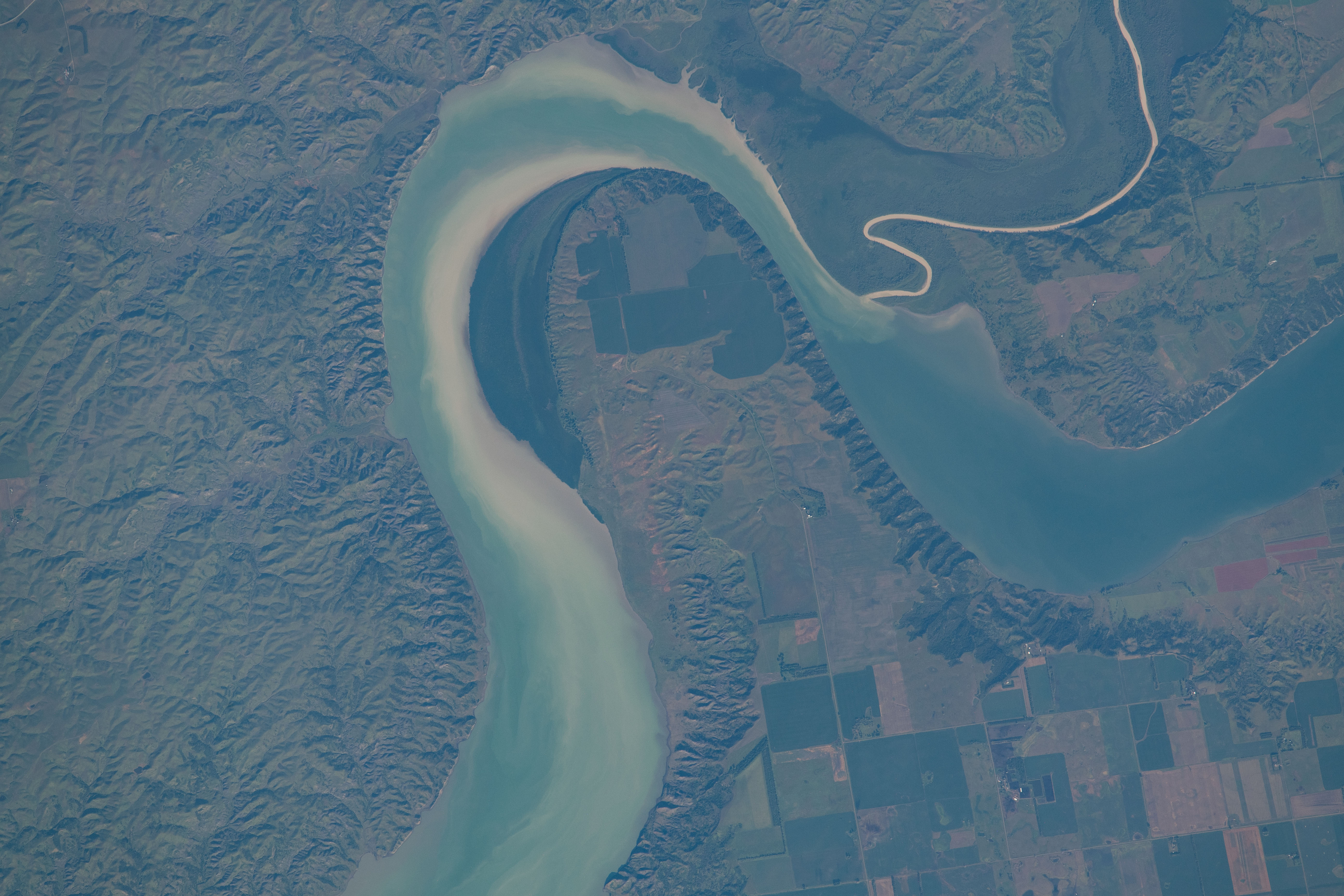
Confluence of the White and Missouri rivers at the Lyman–Brule county border, taken on July 4, 2022, from the International Space Station

- Hughes County – north
- Hyde County – northeast
- Buffalo County – northeast
- Brule County – east
- Charles Mix County – southeast
- Gregory County – south
- Tripp County – south
- Mellette County – southwest
- Jones County – west
- Stanley County – northwest

=== Protected areas ===
- Brakke State Game Production Area
- Brye Bottom State Game Production Area
- Bull Creek State Game Production Area
- Carpenter State Game Production Area
- Cedar Creek Recreation Area
- Counselor Creek Recreation Area
- Dude Ranch State Lakeside Use Area
- Fate Dam State Game Production Aea
- Fort Pierre National Grassland (part)
- Good Soldier Creek Recreation Area
- Iona State Game Production Area
- Iron Nation Recreation Area
- Lindely State Game Production Area
- Lower Brule Recreation Area
- Narrows Recreation Area
- Neugebauer State Game Production Area
- Reis Bottom State Game Production Area
- Salzmann State Game Production Area

=== Lakes ===
- Lake Francis Case (part)
- Lake Sharpe (part)

== Demographics ==
Historical population
Census	Pop.	Note	%±
1880	124		—
1890	233		87.9%
1900	2,632		1,029.6%
1910	10,848		312.2%
1920	6,591		−39.2%
1930	6,335		−3.9%
1940	5,045		−20.4%
1950	4,572		−9.4%
1960	4,428		−3.1%
1970	4,060		−8.3%
1980	3,864		−4.8%
1990	3,638		−5.8%
2000	3,895		7.1%
2010	3,755		−3.6%
2020	3,718		−1.0%
2025 (est.)	3,694	▼	−0.6%
U.S. Decennial Census; 1790–1960 1900–1990; 1990–2000 2010–2020

=== 2020 census ===
As of the 2020 census, there were 3,718 people, 1,303 households, and 892 families residing in the county. The population density was 2.3 inhabitants per square mile (0.89/km^{2}) and there were 1,546 housing units.

Of the residents, 29.5% were under the age of 18 and 16.1% were 65 years of age or older; the median age was 35.7 years. For every 100 females there were 106.9 males, and for every 100 females age 18 and over there were 104.5 males.

The racial makeup of the county was 51.6% White, 0.1% Black or African American, 44.1% American Indian and Alaska Native, 0.1% Asian, 0.2% from some other race, and 3.8% from two or more races. Hispanic or Latino residents of any race comprised 1.2% of the population.

There were 1,303 households in the county, of which 37.2% had children under the age of 18 living with them and 25.8% had a female householder with no spouse or partner present. About 26.4% of all households were made up of individuals and 13.3% had someone living alone who was 65 years of age or older.

Of those housing units, 15.7% were vacant. Among occupied housing units, 65.8% were owner-occupied and 34.2% were renter-occupied. The homeowner vacancy rate was 1.0% and the rental vacancy rate was 8.6%.

=== 2010 census ===
As of the 2010 census, there were 3,755 people, 1,392 households, and 967 families in the county. The population density was 2.3 inhabitants per square mile (0.89/km^{2}). There were 1,704 housing units at an average density of 1.04 units per square mile (0.40 units/km^{2}). The racial makeup of the county was 58.3% white, 38.2% American Indian, 0.3% Asian, 0.1% black or African American, 0.1% from other races, and 2.9% from two or more races. Those of Hispanic or Latino origin made up 1.1% of the population. In terms of ancestry, 27.3% were German, 9.2% were Irish, 9.1% were Norwegian, and 1.0% were American.

Of the 1,392 households, 35.6% had children under the age of 18 living with them, 47.1% were married couples living together, 15.2% had a female householder with no husband present, 30.5% were non-families, and 27.2% of all households were made up of individuals. The average household size was 2.67 and the average family size was 3.19. The median age was 36.1 years.

The median income for a household in the county was $36,323 and the median income for a family was $45,045. Males had a median income of $32,760 versus $25,512 for females. The per capita income for the county was $16,930. About 17.4% of families and 18.8% of the population were below the poverty line, including 25.4% of those under age 18 and 5.8% of those age 65 or over.

== Communities ==
=== City ===
- Presho

=== Towns ===
- Kennebec (county seat)
- Oacoma
- Reliance

=== Census-designated places ===
- Lower Brule
- Vivian
- West Brule

=== Other unincorporated communities ===
- Iona
- Lyman

=== Townships ===
- Bailey
- Butte
- Dorman
- Fairland
- Iona
- Morningside
- Oacoma
- Pleasant
- Pratt
- Reliance
- Rex
- Rose
- Rowe
- Sioux
- Stony Butte

=== Unorganized territories ===
- Black Dog
- Lafayette
- Lower Brule
- McClure
- Northwest Lyman
- South Lyman

== Politics ==
Lyman County voters have been Republican for decades. In no national election has the county selected a Democratic Party candidate since 1964, although Jimmy Carter, Michael Dukakis, Bill Clinton, John Kerry, and Barack Obama have all managed to exceed forty percent. When Hillary Clinton ran on the Democratic ticket in 2016, she won 26 percent of the county's vote, for the lowest Democratic result since Alton B. Parker in 1904 (22 percent).

United States presidential election results for Lyman County, South Dakota
Year	Republican		Democratic		Third party(ies)	
Year	No.	%	No.	%	No.	%
1896	114	59.07%	78	40.41%	1	0.52%
1900	429	66.61%	210	32.61%	5	0.78%
1904	986	73.53%	306	22.82%	49	3.65%
1908	1,524	53.12%	1,183	41.23%	162	5.65%
1912	0	0.00%	766	39.79%	1,159	60.21%
1916	981	45.65%	1,052	48.95%	116	5.40%
1920	1,050	59.63%	463	26.29%	248	14.08%
1924	1,061	44.30%	387	16.16%	947	39.54%
1928	1,488	54.75%	1,222	44.96%	8	0.29%
1932	811	29.71%	1,879	68.83%	40	1.47%
1936	1,090	44.67%	1,321	54.14%	29	1.19%
1940	1,409	56.05%	1,105	43.95%	0	0.00%
1944	867	57.92%	630	42.08%	0	0.00%
1948	993	51.94%	904	47.28%	15	0.78%
1952	1,561	70.09%	666	29.91%	0	0.00%
1956	1,151	56.87%	873	43.13%	0	0.00%
1960	1,166	57.78%	852	42.22%	0	0.00%
1964	862	44.92%	1,057	55.08%	0	0.00%
1968	1,063	57.87%	643	35.00%	131	7.13%
1972	1,166	59.98%	774	39.81%	4	0.21%
1976	892	51.29%	831	47.79%	16	0.92%
1980	1,256	66.88%	486	25.88%	136	7.24%
1984	1,120	69.78%	478	29.78%	7	0.44%
1988	843	56.96%	631	42.64%	6	0.41%
1992	669	45.20%	486	32.84%	325	21.96%
1996	726	47.67%	646	42.42%	151	9.91%
2000	875	63.13%	482	34.78%	29	2.09%
2004	1,029	53.04%	872	44.95%	39	2.01%
2008	894	54.48%	710	43.27%	37	2.25%
2012	933	59.46%	605	38.56%	31	1.98%
2016	977	68.75%	369	25.97%	75	5.28%
2020	1,042	65.25%	525	32.87%	30	1.88%
2024	993	68.62%	422	29.16%	32	2.21%

== See also ==
- National Register of Historic Places listings in Lyman County, South Dakota
- USS Lyman County (LST-903)
