= Senator Lyman =

Senator Lyman may refer to:

- Phineas Lyman (1716–1774), Connecticut State Senate
- Samuel Lyman (1749–1802), Massachusetts State Senate
- William Lyman (congressman) (1755–1811), Massachusetts State Senate
