= María Limón =

American writer

María de Socorro Limón Castro
- Occupations: Writer; Activist; Poet
- Writing career
- Period: 1985-Present

María Limón, born María de Socorro Limón Castro, is a Chicana writer, poet, and activist based in Austin, Texas. As a self-identified queer Tejana, Limón's writing focuses on the queer Latino experience in the Southwestern United States.

== Life and career ==
Though Limón has been writing since 1985, she has been employed in the fields of domestic violence and public health for over three decades. As a member of allgo, an Austin-based queer Latino organization, she worked to assist other queer people of color overcome the oppression they encountered daily. With other members of allgo in 1989, Limón founded Informe-SIDA, a non-profit fighting HIV/AIDS in communities of color in the Austin area. Limón is currently employed as the Prevention Coordinator at the Texas Council on Family Violence.

== Literary themes ==
Much of Limón's work is defined by her identity as a queer Tejana raised in a working-class household. Consequently, themes of navigating multiple cultural identities, intersecting layers of oppression, and the results of education and social mobility are recurring themes in her writing. Her short story "Santiago" focuses on a small moment in the relationship between a young Chicana and her Mexican father. Set in the desert near Alameda, California, the eponymous Santiago muses over his desire for a new car as he waits for his daughter to help him fix his blown out tire. As she pulls in, Limón notes her "outfit that was as far away from Mexican as she could afford,". As they drive to a nearby gas station, Dulce remembers the bits of paint that as a child she would pick off of Santiago's arms. The juxtaposition of Dulce's American clothing, implied to be a result of her college education, and Santiago's paint-flecked arms serve to highlight cultural and class divides between the two. Though she harbors resentment towards her father for leaving her mother and their family, she eventually recalls the selflessness that protected her from harm when they were together. Santiago jokes about being buried in his broken-down car, the nicest car he had ever owned, and Dulce asks him not to joke about such things. Dulce's words represent her respect for her father and his working-class roots, and the two come to a silent understanding before he drives away.

== Contributions ==
- Merienda tejana : the writings of Mary Sue Galindo, María Limón, Jesse Johnson (1985). Compiled by Juan Rodriguez and Petra Rodriguez. Contribution by María Limón.
- Queer Codex: Rooted (2008). Compiled by Lorenzo Herrera y Lozano. Contribution by María Limón.
- Entre Guadalupe y Malinche: Tejanas in Literature and Art (2016). Compiled by Inés Hernández-Ávila and Norma Elia Cantú. Contribution by María Limón.

== Sources ==
- Barrera, Sonia. "María Limón, Austin Activist." María Limón, Austin Activist | UT Watch on the Web. N.p., n.d. Web. 06 Mar. 2017.
- Hamze, Adam. "30 Years On, Austin Group Still Looking Out for Queer People of Color." Reporting Texas. N.p., 9 Dec. 2015. Web. 04 Mar. 2017.
- Hernández-Ávila, Inés, and Norma E. Cantú. Entre Guadalupe Y Malinche: Tejanas in Literature and Art. Austin: U of Texas, 2016. Print.
