= Lyman Mountain =

Mountain peak in Oregon, United States

Coordinates: 42.4755093°N 123.0242129°W

Lyman Mountain is a summit in the U.S. state of Oregon. The elevation is 2,720 feet (830 m).

Lyman Mountain was named in 1894 after George S. Lyman, owner of a local apple orchard.

It is located 16.3 miles (26.2 km) northwest of Medford and 15.6 miles (25.1 km) east of Grants Pass.
