= Lyman, South Dakota =

Unincorporated community in South Dakota, U.S.

Coordinates: 43°52′52″N 99°44′22″W

Lyman is an unincorporated community in Lyman County, in the U.S. state of South Dakota.

== History ==
Lyman was originally called McGill, and under the latter name was laid out in 1919. The present name is after the county in which Lyman is located.
