= William and Julia Lyman House =

- U.S. National Register of Historic Places
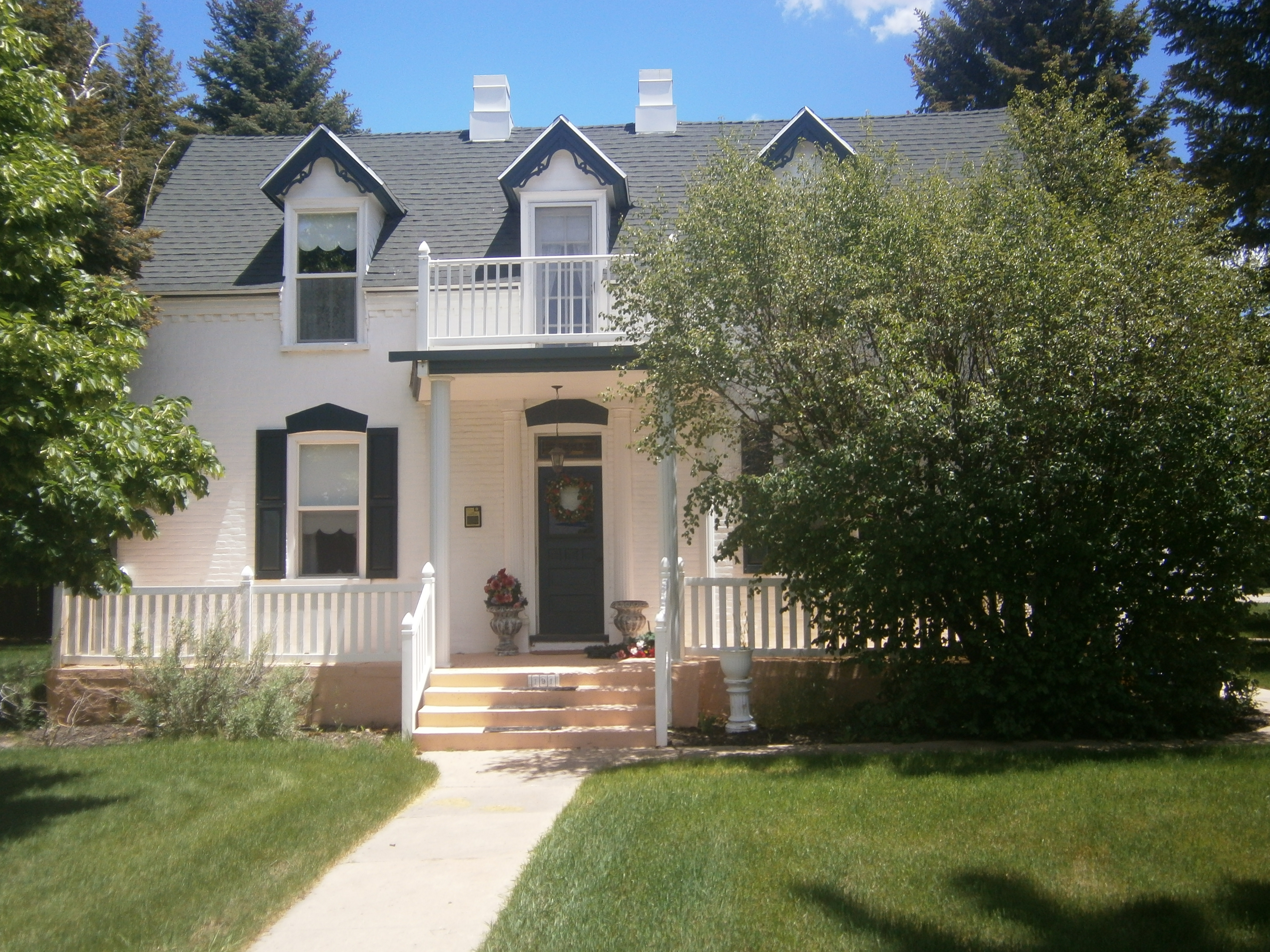

- Location within Utah Location within the United States
- Location: 191 S. Main St., Parowan, Utah
- Coordinates: 37°50′22″N 112°49′35″W
- Area: 0.6 acres (0.24 ha)
- Built: 1895
- Built by: Lyman, William Horne
- Architectural style: Gothic, Central passage
- NRHP reference No.: 00000355
- Added to NRHP: April 6, 2000

The William and Julia Lyman House in Parowan, Utah was constructed in c. 1895. Constructed by William and Julia Lyman, the house is common for an eighteenth-century American building construction. It is one of the few remaining houses of its kind in Parowan.

It was listed on the National Register of Historic Places in 2000.

The house was constructed by prominent members of the community, William and Julia Lyman. Both William and Julia played important roles in Parowan. William, a cattle rancher, served three terms as mayor of the city. He also served as the Iron County representative to the Utah State Legislature from 1925 to 1926. William sat on the board of directors for the Bank of Iron County, was a school trustee for three terms, and worked as a state land appraiser and state inspector of livestock. Julia, besides handling the domestic chores, served as Parowan Stake Relief Society President, one of the highest women's callings in the Church of Jesus Christ of Latter-day Saints. She was also elected to the school board and actively rallied for woman suffrage and Utah statehood.
