= Justice Lyman =

Justice Lyman may refer to:

- Daniel Lyman (1756–1830), chief justice of the Rhode Island Supreme Court
- Frank H. Lyman (1863–1957), associate justice of the Arizona Supreme Court
