= Bernard Lyman =

American boat building company

Bernard Lyman was the co-founder of Lyman Brothers Boat Builders and Lyman Boat Works. Lyman founded the company with his brother, Herman Lyman, in 1875. He designed and built the clinker (boat building) built boat, the Lyman. The Lyman boat has a reputation for, as Tom Koroknay says, "mastering the rugged chop of Lake Erie.

However, the Lyman name would ultimately span far beyond Ohio and Lake Erie. In the 1950s, Lyman introduced multiple product lines that were marketed toward fishermen, jet-setters, and everyone in-between. The company was aggressively marketed, and their naval architecture was essentially similar in design to Great Lakes builders such as Chris-Craft out of Detroit, Michigan. Sleek, modern wood lines, and attention to detail defined the brand, along with the "dual-pane" glazing on most models' front bow/cockpit. Models such as the "Islander" and "Runabout" (between 17' and 22' in length) were most popular. Although they are rare to find today, they still have a sort-of cult-following, and are widely regarded as pioneers in the design of modern sport boats for usage in the Great Lakes, and other places around the world.
