= Dos Bocas Lake =

Lake in Arecibo and Utuado, Puerto Rico

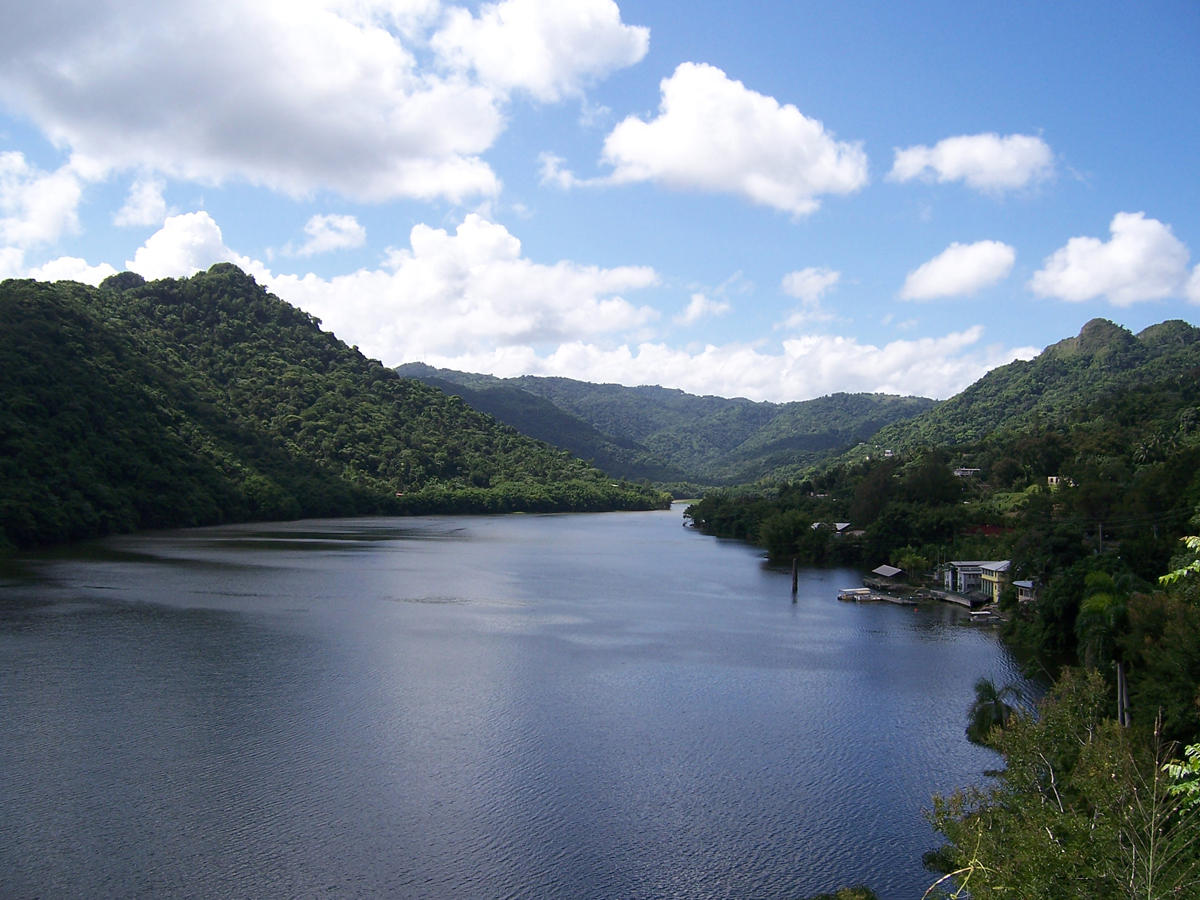
- Lago Dos Bocas Lake

- Location within Puerto Rico
- Location: Arecibo / Utuado municipalities, Puerto Rico
- Coordinates: 18°20′08″N 66°40′03″W
- Type: reservoir
- Basin countries: Puerto Rico
- Surface elevation: 292 ft (89 m)

Dos Bocas Lake is a reservoir of the Arecibo River, located in the municipalities of Arecibo and Utuado in the island of Puerto Rico. Construction of the reservoir began on 1937, and was completed in 1942 with the establishment of the Dos Bocas Dam, by the Puerto Rico Electric Power Authority to be used as a hydroelectric power plant, as part of a New Deal project. The lake also functions as one of the potable water reservoirs of the island. In recent years, silt has accumulated in the lake causing capacity to shrink. Silt has also made some portions of the land inaccessible by boat.

Ferries operated by the Department of Transportation of Puerto Rico provide transportation for residents on the lake as well as for tourists. Several restaurants and house rentals are located on the shore of the lake. Other nearby attractions include the Río Abajo State Forest.

== Gallery ==
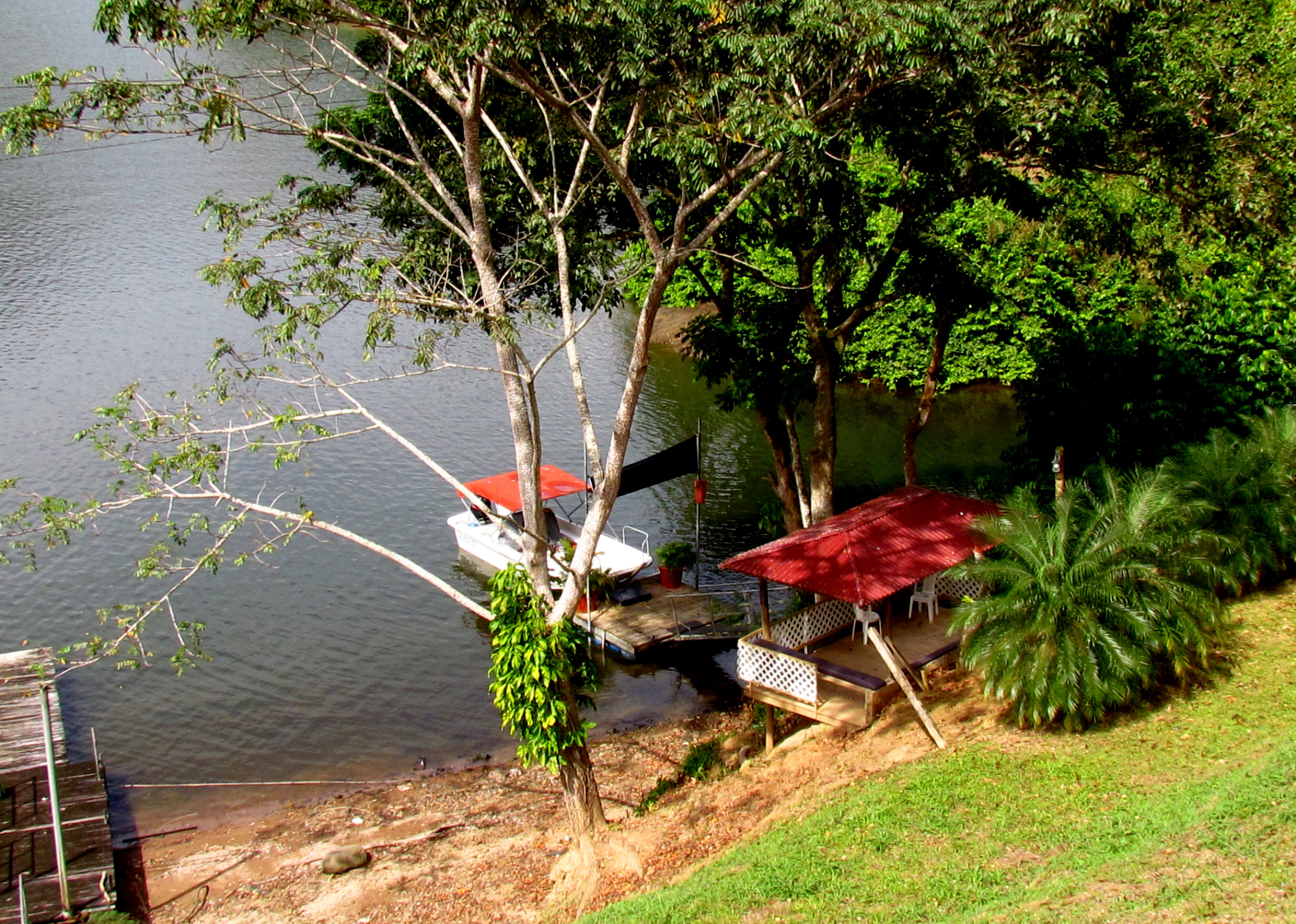
Restaurant with open-air, covered seating at Dos Bocas

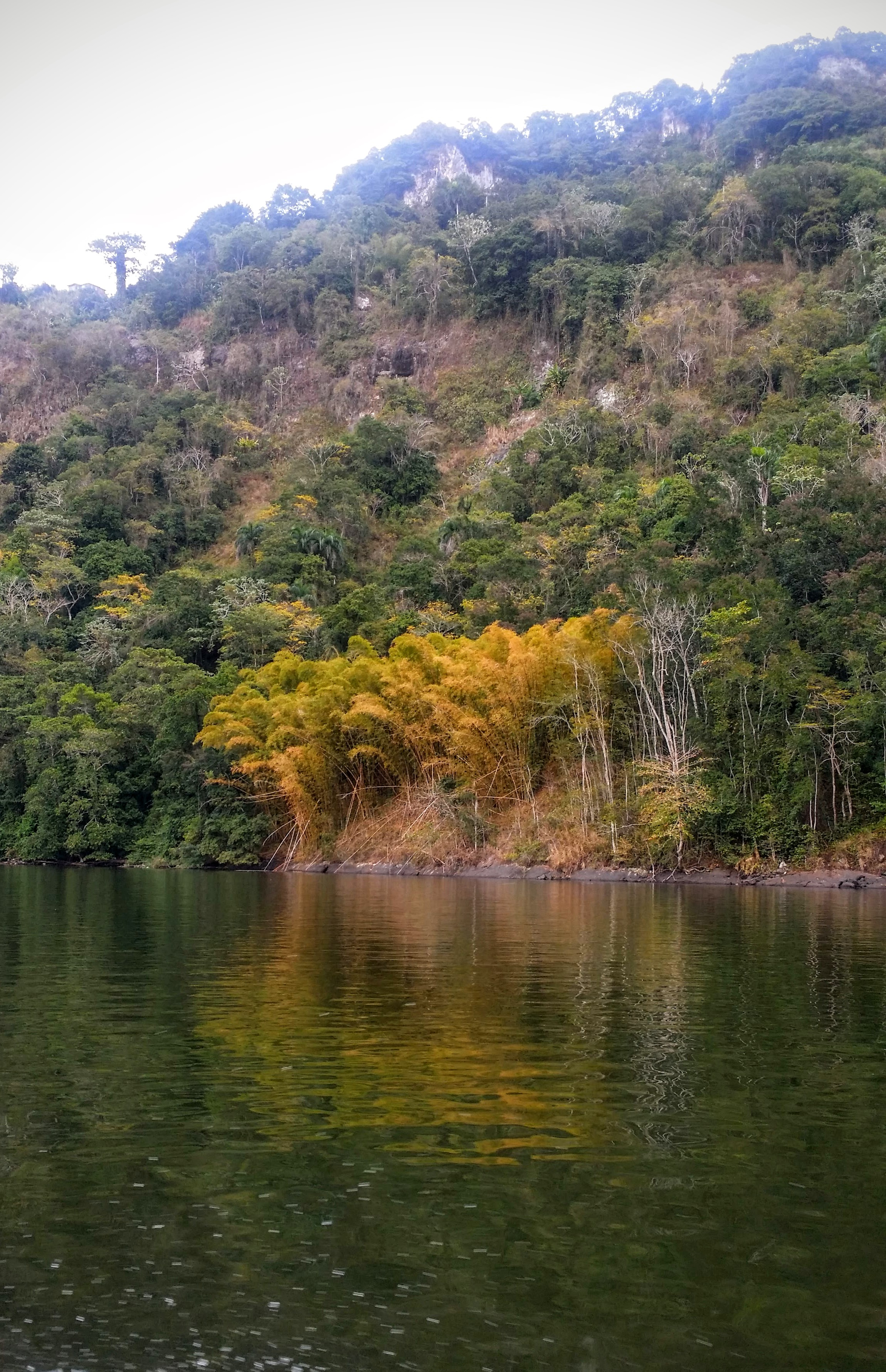
The banks of the lake

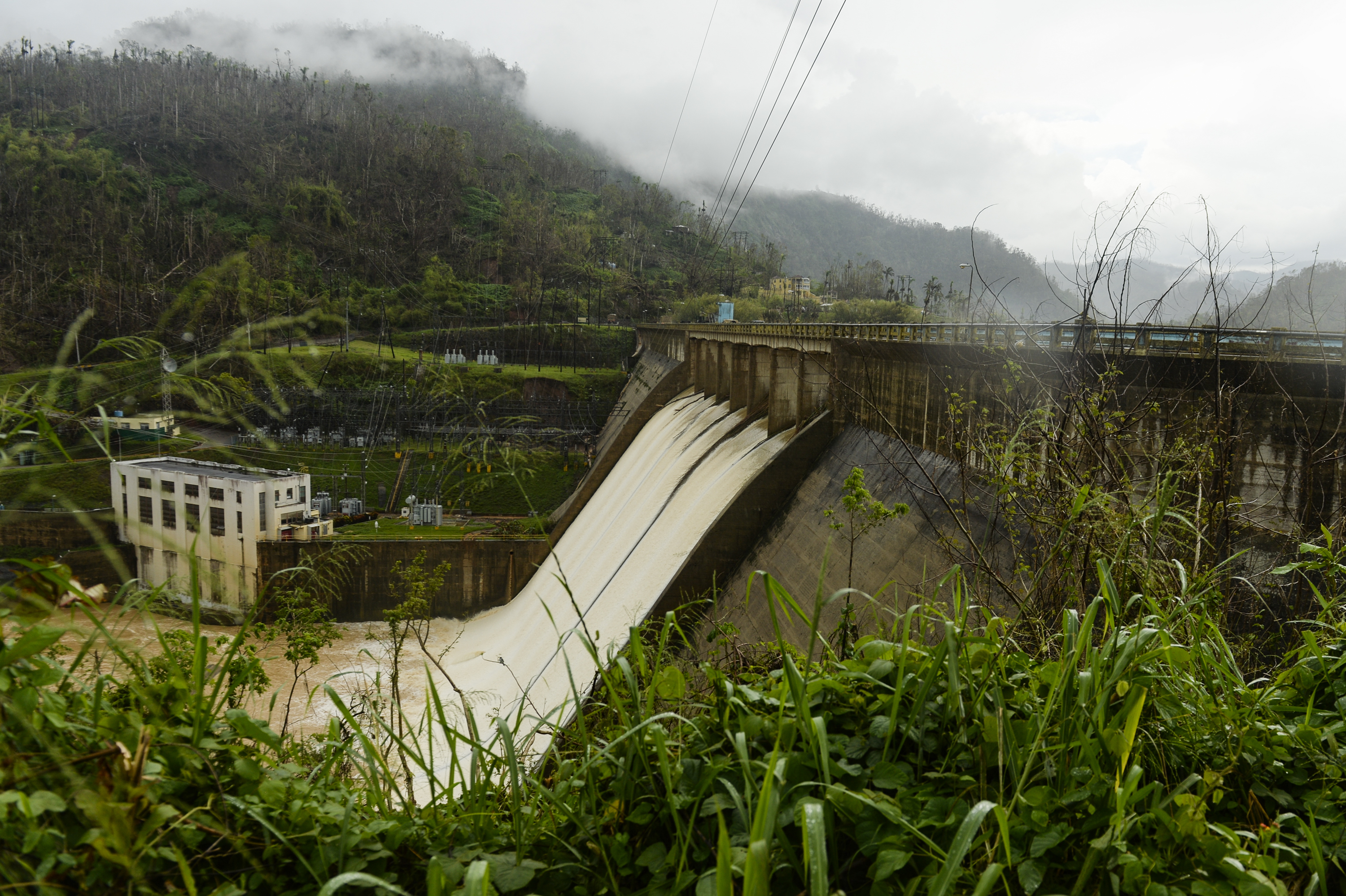
Lago Dos Bocas Dam after Hurricane Maria

== See also ==
- List of dams and reservoirs in Puerto Rico
