= USS Litchfield County =

World War II tank landing ship

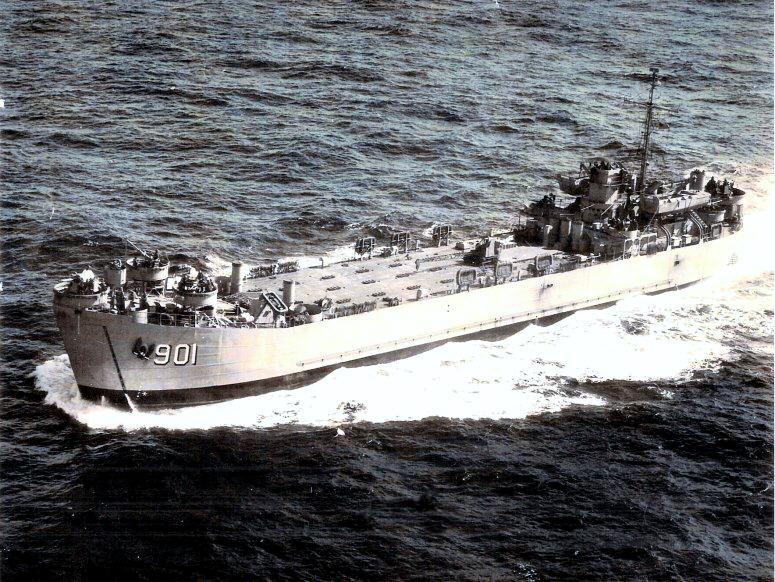
- LST-901 underway off the coast of California, 1952

History

United States
- Name: USS LST-901
- Builder: Dravo Corporation, Pittsburgh
- Laid down: 29 October 1944
- Launched: 9 December 1944
- Commissioned: 11 January 1945
- Decommissioned: 9 August 1946
- Recommissioned: 30 November 1951
- Decommissioned: 20 December 1955
- Renamed: USS Litchfield County (LST-901), 1 July 1955
- Recommissioned: 5 March 1966
- Decommissioned: 7 December 1969
- Stricken: 1 April 1975
- Identification: IMO number: 8624199
- Honors and awards: 2 battle stars (Korea); 6 campaign stars (Vietnam)
- Fate: Sold into commercial service, 1 January 1977; Sold for scrapping, 1996

General characteristics
- Class & type: LST-542-class tank landing ship
- Displacement: 1,625 long tons (1,651 t) light; 4,080 long tons (4,145 t) full
- Length: 328 ft (100 m)
- Beam: 50 ft (15 m)
- Draft: Unloaded : 2 ft 4 in (0.71 m) forward; 7 ft 6 in (2.29 m) aft; Loaded : 8 ft 2 in (2.49 m) forward; 14 ft 1 in (4.29 m) aft
- Propulsion: 2 × General Motors 12-567 diesel engines, two shafts, twin rudders
- Speed: 12 knots (22 km/h; 14 mph)
- Boats & landing craft carried: 2 × LCVPs
- Troops: Approximately 130 officers and enlisted men
- Complement: 8–10 officers, 89–100 enlisted men
- Armament: 8 × 40 mm guns; 12 × 20 mm guns

USS Litchfield County (LST-901) was a LST-542-class tank landing ship built for the United States Navy during World War II. Named after Litchfield County, Connecticut, she was the only U.S. Naval vessel to bear the name.

Originally laid down as USS LST-901 on 29 October 1944 by the Dravo Corporation of Pittsburgh, Pennsylvania; the ship was launched on 9 December 1944, sponsored by Mrs. S. A. Evans; and commissioned on 11 January 1945.

== Service history ==
=== World War II, 1944–1946 ===
Upon completion of her shakedown off Florida, LST-901 sailed to join the Pacific Fleet, arriving at Pearl Harbor on 27 March. After additional training, she reached Saipan on 12 June for resupply missions in the Marianas, Ryūkyūs, and Iwo Jima until the close of the war.

She operated as mother ship for minesweepers around Truk until sailing for the States on 28 November. After several short coastal voyages, she decommissioned at Vancouver, Washington on 9 August 1946.

=== Korean War, 1951–1955 ===
Recommissioned on 30 November 1951, LST-901 prepared for service in the Korean War, sailing from San Diego on 7 July 1952 for Hawaii, Midway, and Inchon, arriving on 5 September. Logistic support lifts, amphibious landing rehearsals, and service as helicopter pad and control vessel for the Wonsan naval blockade were her missions until returning to San Diego on 21 May. From 1 August to 12 October she participated in the lift of the 3rd Marines to Japan.

An uneasy peace reigned in Korea as she departed for her third Far Eastern tour on 27 March 1954. After amphibious exercises, on 17 August LST-901 joined the giant "Operation Passage to Freedom". Between 29 August and 7 November she made seven trips to Hai Phong, North Vietnam to transport troops and refugees to Da Nang and Saigon in the South. Following a cruise to Inchon, she returned to San Diego 13 February 1955.

After training operations along the west coast, LST-901 reported at San Francisco for inactivation on 1 July. On that day she was named USS Litchfield County (LST-901). Placed in commission in reserve on 19 September, she decommissioned at Long Beach, California 20 December 1955.

=== Vietnam War, 1966–1969 ===
As the Vietnam War escalated, demands on American seapower again greatly increased, and early in 1966 Litchfield County was towed to Portland, Oregon for reactivation. She recommissioned on 5 March 1966. After shakedown out of San Diego she sailed on 3 June for her new home port, Apra, Guam, arriving on the 30th. Litchfield County sailed for Chu Lai with troops on 9 July, arriving off South Vietnam ten days later. Resupply missions in support of ground forces continued through 9 November, when she returned to Guam. On 21 January 1967 she arrived off Vietnam once again to resume her essential resupply missions. Shuttling between Da Nang and Chu Lai for the next five weeks, she departed on 23 February, arriving at Guam on 18 March. Litchfield County completed two more Vietnam tours before the end of the year, sandwiching in between those tours duty as a survey ship in the western Carolines during July. During 1968, and into 1969, she continued to operate in the Pacific on survey and resupply missions from the Carolines, to Japan, and to Vietnam.

=== Decommissioning and sale ===
Decommissioned on 7 December 1969 at Guam, she was struck from the Naval Vessel Register on 1 April 1975. Sold for scrapping by the Defense Reutilization and Marketing Service (DRMS) on 1 January 1977, she was acquired by the Aphrodite Shipping & Trading Corporation S.A., of Panama and renamed Petrola 132. After nearly two decades of commercial service she was again sold for scrapping, and arrived in tow at Aliağa, Turkey for demolition by Seltas A.S. on 5 April 1996.

== Awards ==
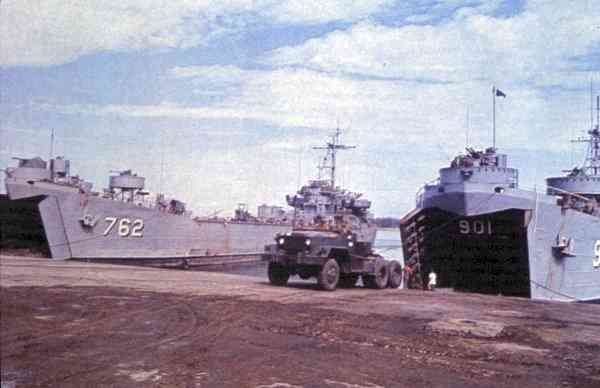
USS Litchfield County (LST-901) and the USS Floyd County (LST-762) moored to the LST ramp at Da Nang, South Vietnam, 1968.

LST-901 earned two battle stars for Korean War service, and as Litchfield County six campaign stars for Vietnam War service.
