= Río Limón =

River of Puerto Rico

Coordinates: 18.3221735°N 66.6551738°W

Location
- Commonwealth: Puerto Rico
- Municipality: Utuado

Physical characteristics
- Source
  - elevation: 292 feet

The Río Limón is a river of Utuado and Jayuya, Puerto Rico. It flows into Lago Dos Bocas, a reservoir.

== See also ==
- List of rivers of Puerto Rico
