= Henry Herbert Lyman =

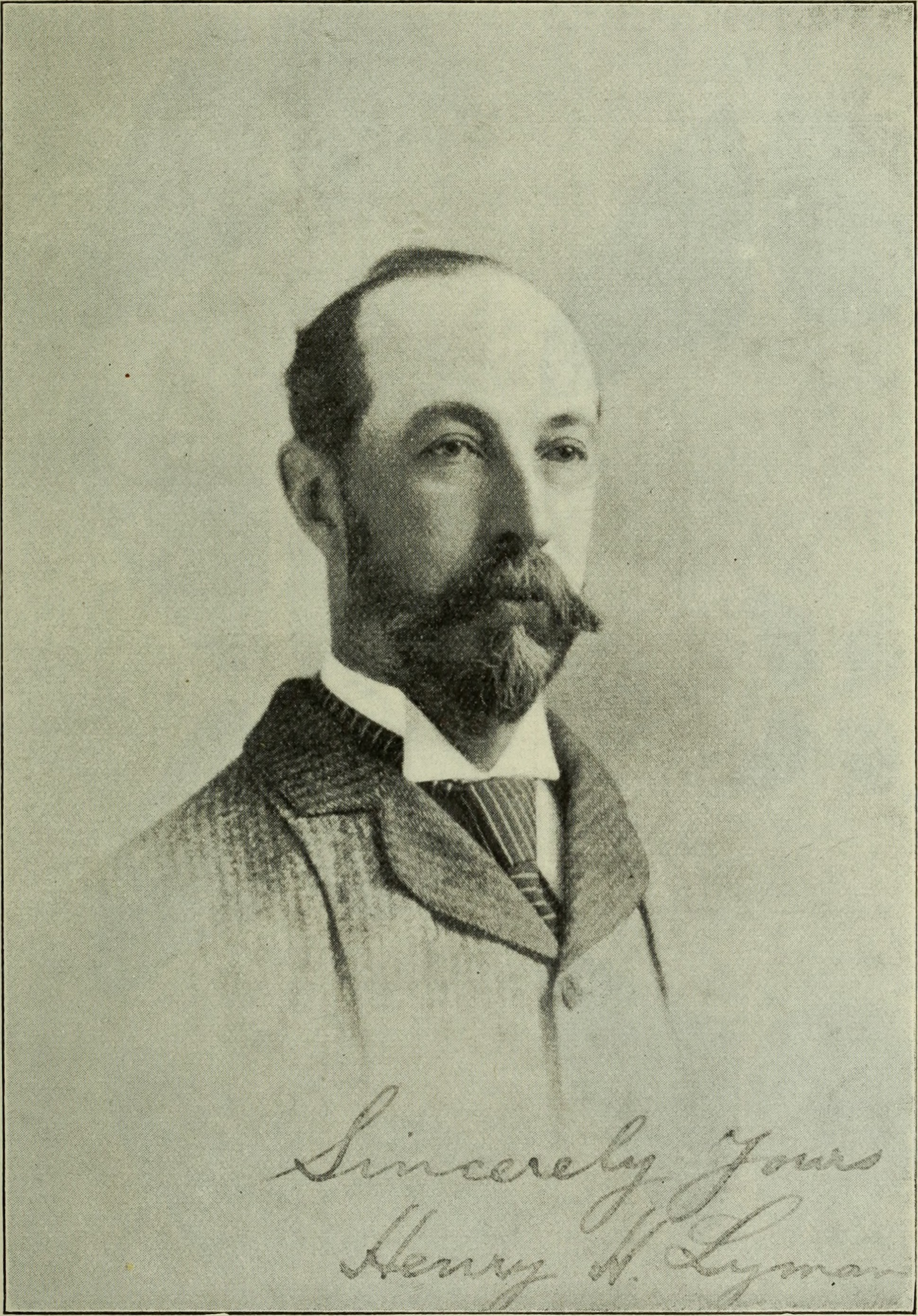

Henry Herbert Lyman (21 December 1854 – 29 May 1914) was a Canadian businessman and amateur entomologist with an interest mainly in the butterflies. A member of a prominent family of industrialists who owned Canada's largest pharmaceutical company in its time, he and his wife were killed in the sinking of the RMS Empress of Ireland in 1914.

== Life and work ==
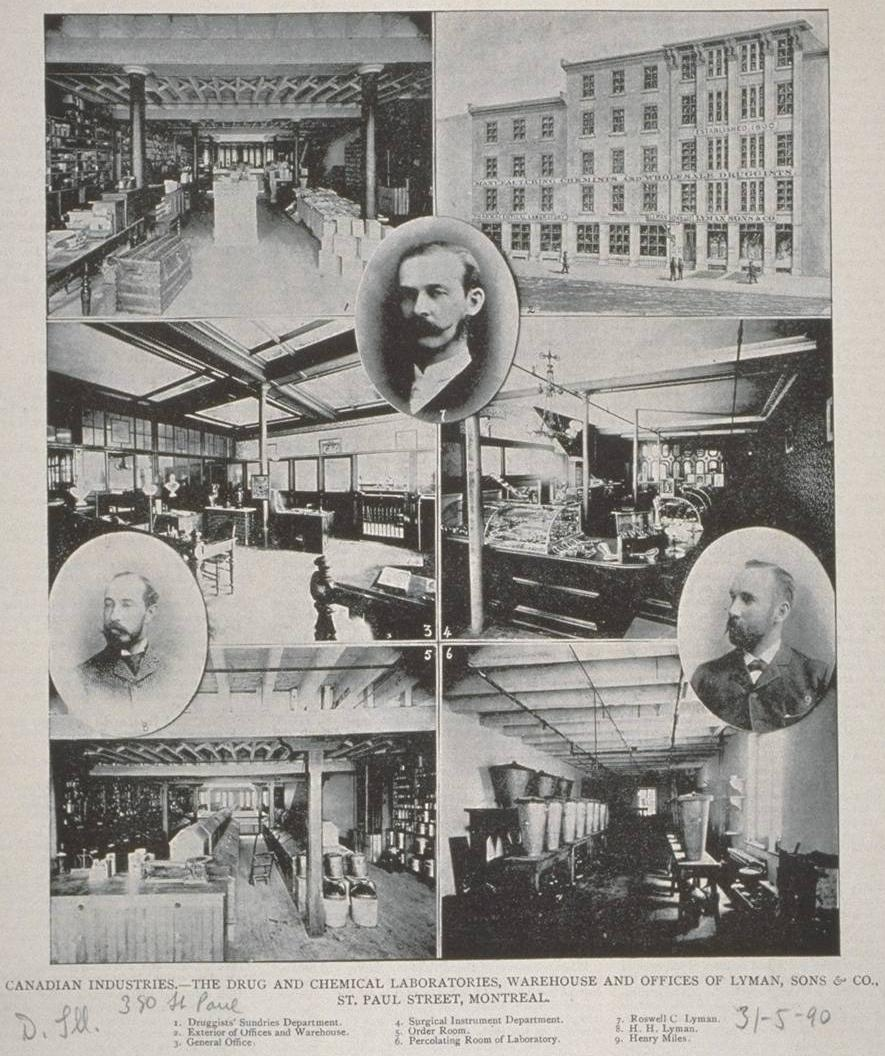
Views of the Lyman company, from The Dominion Illustrated, 1890

Lyman was born in Montreal in a family of industrialists from England. They were a part of the Anglo-Protestant elite that lived in Montreal's Square Mile. He was educated at the West End Academy before joining McGill University. He graduated BA in 1876 with a Logan medal in geology and natural science. In 1877 he served in the 5th Battalion of the Canadian Volunteer force, retiring in 1891 as a Major. After an MA in 1880 he joined the pharmacists company Lymans, Clare & Co., Canada's largest pharmaceutical company which was owned by his father Henry Lyman (1813–1897). He succeeded his father as a senior partner and president for Lymans Limited at Toronto. He supported the British Empire and was an organizer of the Imperial Federation League of Canada. In 1875 he became a member of the Entomological Society of Ontario and collected butterfly specimens on his summer holidays mainly on the Atlantic Coast, also taking an interest in rearing them. In 1877 he served as vice president of the Montreal branch of the entomological society and served as its president in 1881 and from 1888 to 1899. As a major industrialist he also held positions such as on the Montreal General Hospital and as director for the British and Colonial Press Service. He grew hard of hearing and needed an ear trumpet and sometimes needed to write to communicate. He lived along, taking care of his ailing mother until her death. In 1912 he married Florence Holwell (1877–1914), daughter of Rev. William Kirkby of New York. He and his wife finally found time to travel on what was to be their honeymoon and were drowned when the RMS Empress of Ireland on they were travelling in on the Saint Lawrence River collided with another ship. He published over sixty notes, mainly in the Canadian Entomologist. His insect collections (nearly 20,000) were bequeathed to the Redpath Museum, McGill University and forms the Lyman entomological museum and research laboratory. He also donated as many as 3249 books to the library. In 1961, the collections were moved to Quebec to become the Lyman Entomological Museum and Research Laboratory.
