= John Lyman (American football) =

American football player and coach

Biographical details
- Education: Yale University

Coaching career (HC unless noted)
- 1894: Doane

Head coaching record
- Overall: 5–2

H. L. "John" Lyman was an American college football player and coach.

Lyman attended Yale University where he played for three years on Yale's football teams. After leaving Yale, he served as the captain of a football team in Salt Lake City.

In 1894, he was hired as the third head football coach for Doane College in Crete, Nebraska. The 1894 season was Doane's fifth season of college football, and Lyman was hired as part of the college's effort to secure "the very best coaching talent obtainable." He led the 1894 Doane football team to a 5–2 record, outscoring opponents by a total of 122 to 40. The season's highlights included a 12–0 victory over Western Interstate University Football Association champion Nebraska.

== Head coaching record ==
Year	Team	Overall	Conference	Standing	Bowl/playoffs
Doane Tigers (Independent) (1894)
1894	Doane	5–2			
Doane:		5–2			
Total:		5–2			
