= Jauca River =

River of Puerto Rico

Coordinates: 18.2188450°N 66.6404511°W

Location
- Commonwealth: Puerto Rico

The Jauca River is a river in Puerto Rico.

== See also ==
- List of rivers of Puerto Rico
