= Robert J. Dole Institute of Politics =

Institution located on the campus of the University of Kansas

Coordinates: 38°57′20″N 95°15′55″W

The Robert J. Dole Institute of Politics
- Established: 2003
- Academic affiliations: University of Kansas
- Director: Audrey Coleman
- Location: Lawrence, Kansas, U.S.
- Website: www.doleinstitute.org

The Robert J. Dole Institute of Politics, often shortened to the Dole Institute, is a bipartisan political institution located at the University of Kansas and founded by the former U.S. Senator from Kansas and 1996 Republican presidential candidate Bob Dole. Opened on July 22, 2003, Dole's 80th birthday, the institute's $11.3 million, 28,000-square-foot (2,600 m^{2}) facility houses Dole's papers and hosts frequent political events. The institute is officially bi-partisan and has sponsored on-campus programs featuring prominent politicians of both major parties. The institute sponsors the Dole Lecture, which is given in April and features a prominent national figure addressing some aspect of contemporary politics or policy. The institute awards the annual Dole Leadership Prize each September, which includes a $25,000 cash award. The Presidential Lecture Series features the nation's leading presidential scholars, historians, journalists, and others including former Presidents, cabinet officers, and White House staff members who discuss the nation's highest office in ways that combine scholarly rigor with popular access. The archives hosted an exhibit in 2017 entitled "The League of Wives: Vietnam’s POW/MIA Allies & Advocates." In 2017, Elizabeth Dole gifted her career papers to the Dole Institute Archive and Special Collections.

The director of the institute is Audrey Coleman. Director Emeritus is Bill Lacy, who worked as a strategist on both Sen. Dole's 1988 and 1996 presidential campaigns and his 1992 senatorial campaign. Steve McAllister, the former dean of the University of Kansas School of Law, served as interim director from October 2003 to September 2004, prior to the arrival of Lacy. Richard Norton Smith, a presidential historian, was the founding director of the Dole Institute and held the position for two years. Lacy took a temporary leave of absence from the institute to work on the presidential campaign of former Senator Fred Thompson and returned to his role as director in the spring of 2008.

== Features and gifts ==
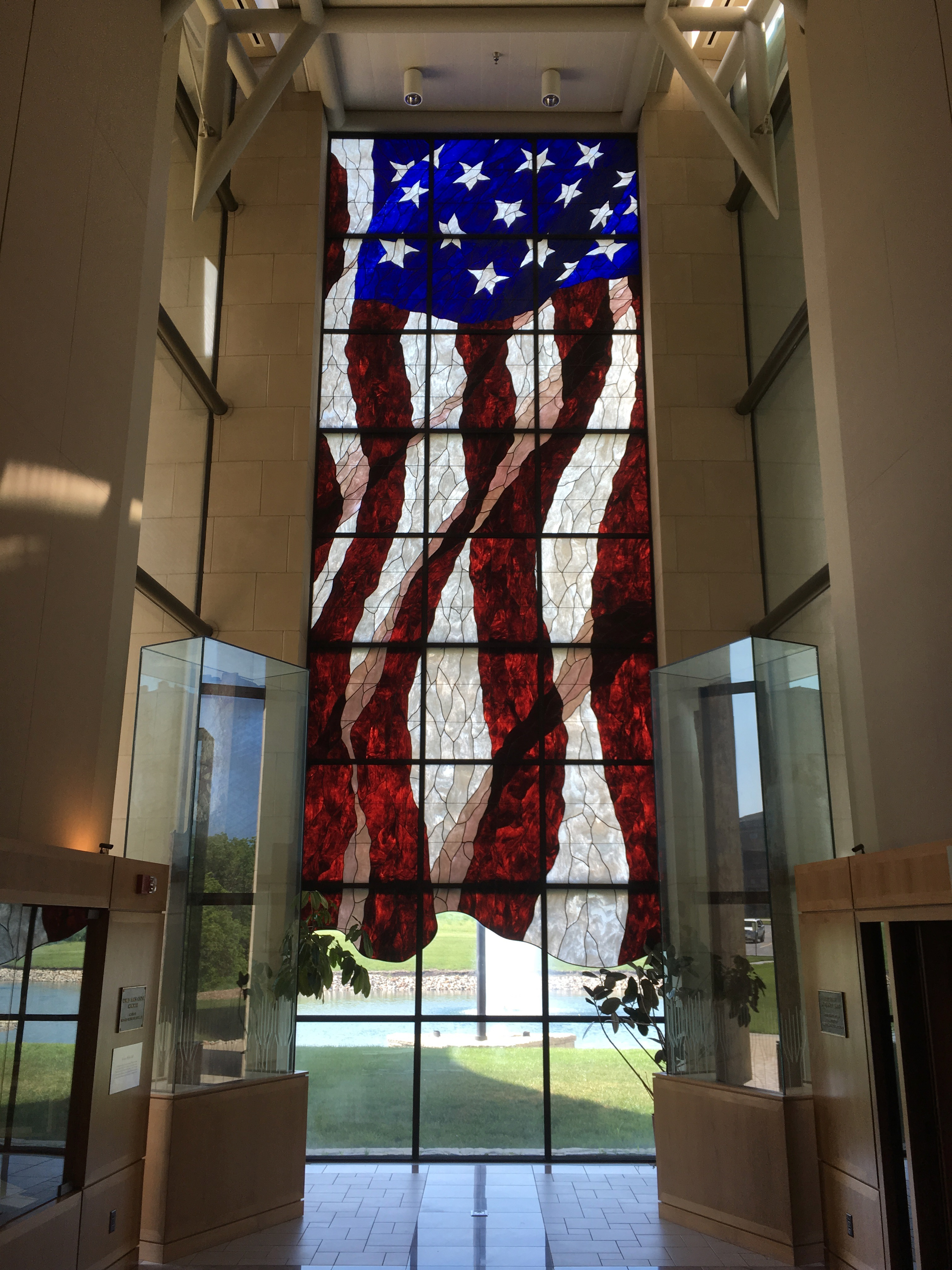
The south-facing Old Glory in Stained Glass and World Trade Center Memorial.

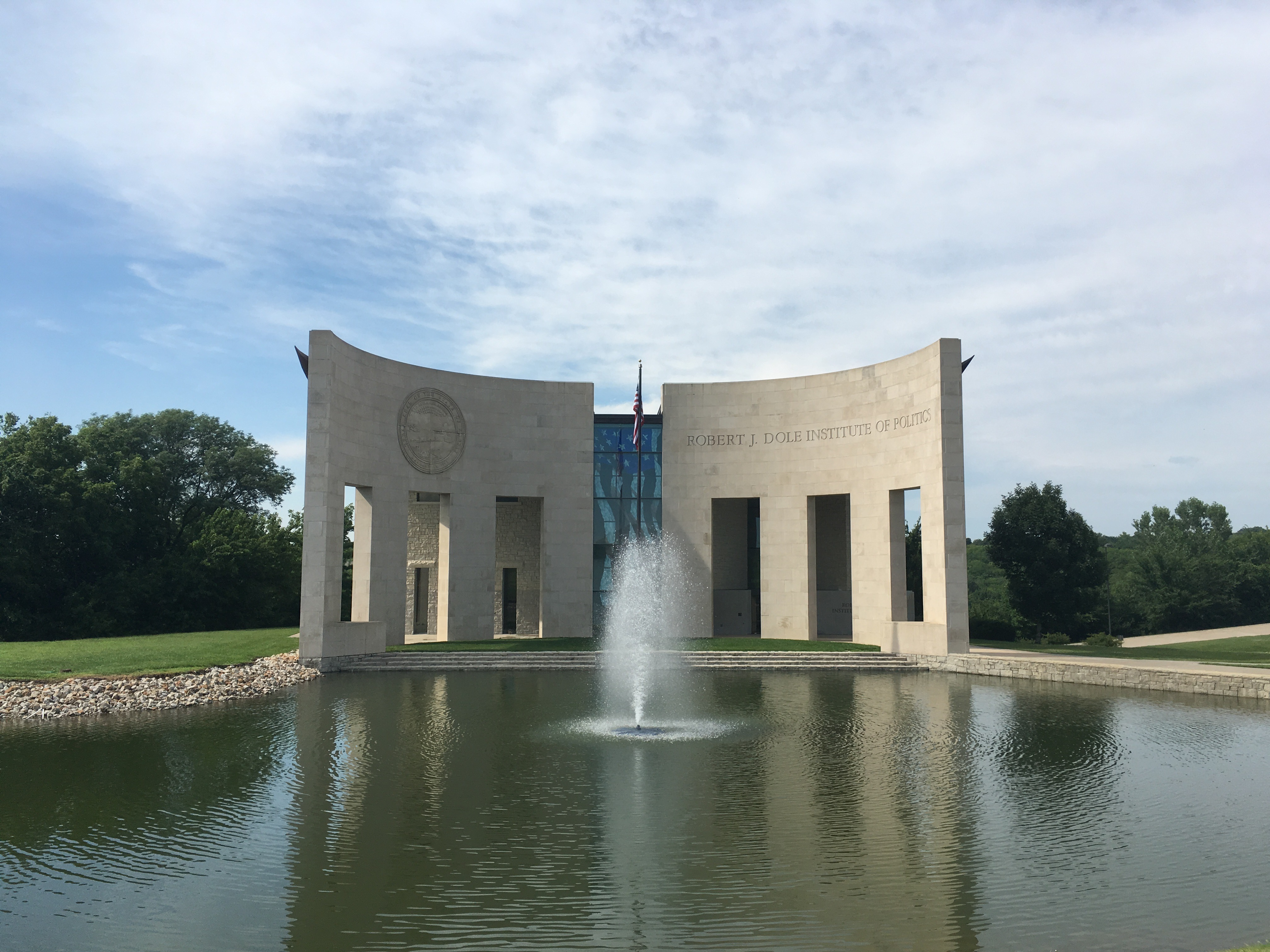
The exterior of the Dole Institute of Politics; Polly's Pond and the Kansas State Seal.

The Exterior of the building features a path leading to the main entrance which is paved with commemorative bricks, many of which are dedicated in memory of World War II veterans. The area continues to expand as additional personalized bricks are purchased. Other external features include Polly's Pond and the Kansas State Seal.

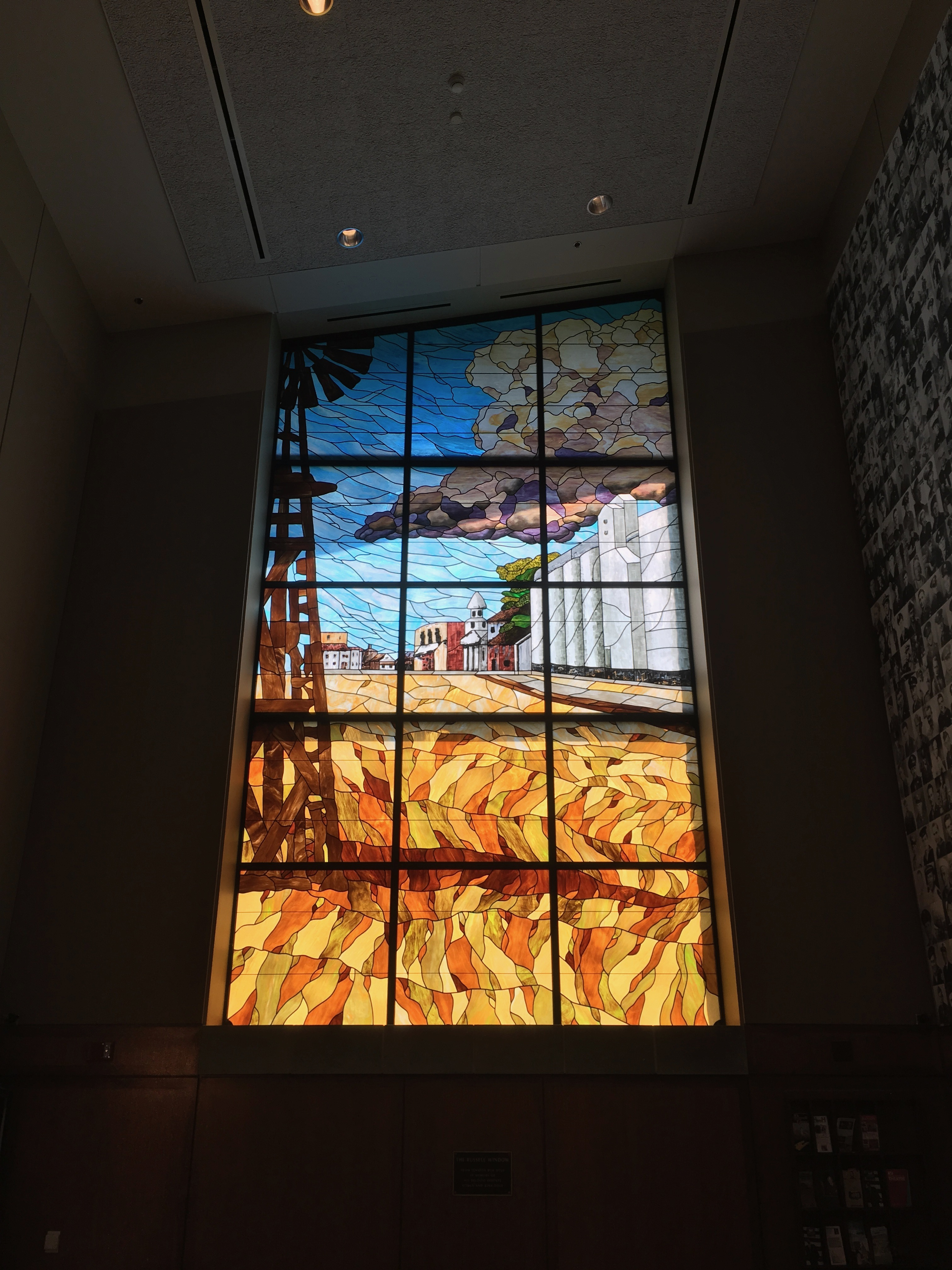
The east-facing Russel Window pictured in the early morning.

- Polly's Pond is a 32,000 sq ft (3,000 m^{2}) reflecting pool reminiscent of the Washington, D.C. Tidal Basin. A water fountain is located in the center of the pool in front of the Dole Institute. Polly's Pond is a gift from Polly Bales of Logan, Kansas.
- The Kansas State Seal is a 14-foot (4.3 m) replica of the Kansas State Seal which crowns façade of the building. The Kansas State Seal is a gift from the Dane G. Hansen Foundation of Logan, Kansas. It is believed to be the largest Kansas State Seal.

The Darby Gallery is the main lobby of the Dole Institute. It features the Russell Window, the Kansas Granite Floor Map, and the beginning of the museum exhibit. The Darby Gallery is a gift from the family of former Kansas United States Senator Harry Darby.

- The Russell Window is a 20-foot (6.1 m) by 12-foot (3.7 m) stained-glass work of art evoking the landscape of Russell, Kansas (Dole's hometown) and similar Kansas towns. The Russell Window is a gift from the Senator in memory of his parents, Doran and Bina Dole.
- The Kansas Granite Floor Map is a 19-foot (5.8 m) red granite floor map of Kansas with brass stars symbolizing the three towns of Russell, Topeka, and Lawrence; all of these towns played an important role in Senator Dole's life. The Kansas Granite Floor Map is a gift from the Billings family.

Hansen Hall is the main exhibit hall of the Dole Institute. It is a gift of the Dane G. Hansen Foundation of Logan, Kansas, is encircled by 20 separate exhibits. The dramatic ceiling slopes from 12 feet at the North end to 36 feet at the south end. The floor is laid with tile from Crossville, Tennessee. The hall serves as an exhibit space, public forum, and venue for meetings, programs, and dinners. It features the Old Glory in Stained Glass, the World Trade Center Memorial, and the U.S. Capitol Dome.

- The Old Glory in Stained Glass is a 29-foot (8.8 m) stained-glass American flag. It is believed to be the largest stained-glass flag in the world. The display is a gift from University of Kansas alumni Forrest and Sally Hoglund.
- The World Trade Center Memorial consists of two 11½-foot (3.5 m) columns salvaged from the Twin Towers. The beams are displayed behind glass with an accompanying commemorative plaque. The columns are a gift from University of Kansas alumni Fred and Virginia Urban Merrill.
- The U.S. Capitol Dome is a 12-foot (3.7 m) replica of the U.S. Capitol Dome and is a gift from Senators Bob and Elizabeth Dole. The dome serves as a background for many of the events hosted in Hansen Hall at the Dole Institute of Politics.

The Rhodes Conference Room is a private meeting and conference room which features a wall of awards received by to Senator Dole. The room is a gift from Roland and Winona Rhodes.

The Simons Media Room is a gift from the Simons Family. The room hosts an independent exhibit featuring the 1976 presidential election and serves as a forum for many of the smaller events at the Dole Institute.

== Student involvement ==
The Dole Institute offers a wide array of activities for students. The institute Student Advisory Board is a group of students united by common interests in community service, government, and politics. They typically hold bimonthly meetings. The group also hosts numerous programs including discussion groups, pizza and politics, and an evening program each year. Their events have featured prominent national journalists like Alex Burns, David Weigel, Josh Dawsey, Nicholas Fandos, Seung Min Kim, and Dave Wasserman. Other guests have included Kathleen Sebelius, Matthew Dowd, Lee Epstein, Jeff Roe, Johanna Maska, Newt Gingrich, Derek Schmidt and many more. Discussion groups are hosted by Dole Fellows, each weekly discussion focuses on a specific topic or issue and features an expert in that field. These small discussion groups provide hands-on knowledge and direct interaction with experts. Pizza and politics sessions unite University of Kansas students with professional experts from around the country for a candid lunchtime conversation.

The Dole hosts the Youth Civic Leadership Institute for high school students. Additionally, the Dole Institute annually gives a junior the Robert E. Hemenway Public Service Award. This award goes to a high-profile student leader who is respected by peers and is concerned with strengthening civic life at the University of Kansas. A second award given to a member of the Student Advisory Board is entitled the Robert J. Dole Service to Country Award. The recipient shall be committed to public service and have demonstrated leadership. A third award given to a member of the Student Advisory Board is entitled the Elizabeth Dole Award. The recipient must demonstrate their commitment to public service by supporting and growing student culture; embracing opportunities to bridge education with future goals; and participating in civic engagement.

== Dole Lecture ==
- 2004 - Bill Clinton
- 2005 - Bob Dole
- 2006 - Tom Daschle
- 2007 - Richard B. Myers
- 2008 - Tom Brokaw
- 2009 - Bob and Elizabeth Dole
- 2010 - Sheila Bair
- 2011 - Bob Woodward
- 2012 - George J. Mitchell
- 2013 - Carl Reddel (IKE's Legacy)
- 2014 - Al From
- 2015 - Lynn Jenkins
- 2016 - Martin Frost and Tom Davis
- 2017 - Robert Steven Kaplan
- 2018 - Vlora Çitaku
- 2019 - Carly Fiorina
- 2021 - Jean-Arthur Régibeau
- 2022 - Walt Riker and Clarkson Hine
- 2023 - Trent Lott and Tom Daschle

== Dole Leadership Prize ==
- 2003 - Rudy Giuliani
- 2004 - George McGovern
- 2005 - Lech Wałęsa
- 2006 - Howard Baker
- 2007 - John Lewis
- 2008 - George H. W. Bush
- 2009 - Donna Shalala
- 2010 - WWII Women Airforce Service Pilots (WASP)
- 2011 - Viktor Yushchenko
- 2012 - Wounded Warrior Project
- 2013 - Nelson Mandela
- 2014 - John D. Kemp
- 2015 - Bill Clinton
- 2016 - Nancy Kassebaum
- 2017 - Tom Harkin
- 2018 - James Baker
- 2019 - Temple Grandin
- 2022 - Juan Manuel Santos

== Presidential Lecture Series ==
- 2002 - Inaugural Series with Edmund Morris, Michael Beschloss, and David McCullough
- 2003 - Presidential Historians and Authors with Robert Caro and David Gergen
- 2004 - Lincoln Week with Douglas L. Wilson, Allen Guelzo, Phil Paludan, Jean Baker, and James M. McPherson
- 2005 - President Reagan: The Role of a Lifetime with Lou Cannon, Jim Hooley, Andrew Littlefair, Gary Foster, Jack Matlock, Frank Donatelli, Ed Rollins, and Richard Wirthlin
- 2006 - The First Woman President with Carol Moseley-Braun, Eleanor Clift, Celinda Lake, Kellyanne Conway, Mary Beth Cahill, Tom Daffron, Jeanne Shaheen, Jane Swift, and Barbara Lee
- 2007 - The 2008 Campaign and a Special Tribute to President Ford with Richard Norton Smith, Erick-Woods Erickson, Patrick Hynes, Scott W. Johnson, Joan McCarter, David D. Perlmutter, Charlie Cook, David Yepsen, Tom Rath, and Jonathan Epstein
- 2008 - The American Presidency: Past, Present, and Future with Steve Kraske, Jill Zuckman, Joel Mathis, Lou Cannon, Carl M. Cannon, Geoff Earle, Lynn Sweet, Tom Beaumont, and Kasey Pipes
- 2009 - Ten Score: Abraham Lincoln's Legacy with Richard Norton Smith, Michael Burlingame, Ron White, and Jennifer Weber
- 2010 - Bob Dole: 50 Years of Leadership and Bipartisanship with Jake Thompson, Sheila Burke, Rod DeArment, Michael Glassner, Richard A. Baker, and Jack Danforth
- 2011 - 20th Century Mount Rushmore with Richard Norton Smith
- 2012 - Why Presidents Succeed. Why They Fail with Richard Norton Smith, John Andrews, Lee Huebner, with Mark Updegrove
- 2013 - In the Beginning: Three Men Who Made America with Richard Norton Smith
- 2014 - The First Ladies: Intimate Sacrifice, Honored Post with Richard Norton Smith
- 2015 - The First Woman President 2.0 with Kathleen Sebelius, Adrienne Kimmell, Gilda Cobb Hunter, Beka Romm, Joan Wagnon, Mary Banwart, Ann Cudd, and Alice Lieberman
- 2016 - They Also Ran: America's Would-Be Presidents with Richard Norton Smith
- 2017 - The U.S. and the Great War: 100 Years Later with Michael Neiberg, Richard S. Faulkner, Jennifer Keene, and John Milton Cooper
- 2018 - 1 to 44: The Best and the Worst of American Presidents with Richard Norton Smith
- 2019 - Follow the Leader: Four Women's Journeys in Public Service with Christina Ostmeyer, Danielle Rudes, Julie A. Robinson, and Mary Lou Jaramillo
- 2020 - Presidential Speeches and Rhetoric with Dr. Robert Rowland
- 2021 - Where Do We Go from Here? with Richard Norton Smith
- 2022 - Military Veterans in the Oval Office with Richard Norton Smith
- 2023 - First Ladies as Presidential Partners with Diana B. Carlin
- 2024 - Exactly How Much Power Does an American President Have? with Matt Beat

== Elizabeth Dole Women in Leadership Lecture ==
- 2017 - Elizabeth Dole
- 2018 - Meg Kabat, Robyn Loveland, and Carolyn Tolliver-Lee
- 2019 - Sharice Davids
- 2020 - Diana M. Holland
- 2022 - Sherrie Rollins Westin
