= Posthumous election =

Election in which a candidate dies prior to election day

A posthumous election is an election in which a candidate dies prior to election day and still wins the race. With the adoption of the Australian ballot, government-printed ballots are finalized in advance, creating a scenario where a deceased candidate's name remains on the ballot and may finish first.

In nations using the "American Rule", votes are valid for determining the outcome of the election. If a deceased candidate receives the most votes, they win the election and a formal vacancy occurs at the beginning of the office's term. In other nations, which use the "English Rule", officials must discard votes cast for deceased candidates, or nullify the entire election.

In many cases, voters are aware the candidate died. Campaigns supporting the deceased suggest that a vote is to honor the candidate, or to provide the candidate's political party with the opportunity to select a replacement. In 2022, Sergiu Gherghina, Aurelian Giugal, and Antonio Momoc described voting for a deceased candidate as electoral process nullification.

In some jurisdictions, like Florida, the political party can select a replacement prior to the election, and votes cast for the deceased candidate are counted toward that replacement. Other jurisdictions, such as Washington, have considered statutory reforms to discard votes cast for deceased candidates when ballots have already been printed.

A posthumous election was fictionalized in season 4 of the The West Wing.

== List of politicians elected posthumously ==
This list includes winning candidates who died prior to (or on the day of) a general election.

Name	Nation	Office	Date	Notes/Reference
David Andahl	United States	North Dakota House of Representatives	2020	
Nick Begich Sr.	United States	United States House of Representatives	1972	
Hale Boggs	United States	United States House of Representatives	1972	
Mel Carnahan	United States	United States Senate	2000	
Barbara Cooper	United States	Tennessee House of Representatives	2022	
Glenda Dawson	United States	Texas House of Representatives	2006	
Tony DeLuca	United States	Pennsylvania House of Representatives	2022	
D. O. Dillavou	United States	South Dakota House of Representatives	1968	
Roy Edwards	United States	Wyoming House of Representatives	2020	
Roger Freeman	United States	Washington House of Representatives	2014	
Dennis Hof	United States	Nevada State Assembly	2018	
Michael Kavulich	United States	Pennsylvania House of Representatives	2018	
John Kirkman	United Kingdom	Member of Parliament	1780	Died day of the election
Edward Legge	United Kingdom	Member of Parliament	1747	
Omar Menéndez	Ecuador	Mayor of Puerto López Canton	2023	Assassinated
Clem Miller	United States	United States House of Representatives	1962	
Patsy Mink	United States	United States House of Representatives	2002	
Jenny Oropeza	United States	California State Senate	2010	
James J. Rhoades	United States	Pennsylvania State Senate	2008	
Charles Turbiville	United States	South Dakota House of Representatives	2018	
Dorothy Wyatt	Canada	Mayor of St. John's	2001	
Ion Aliman	Romania	Mayor of Deveselu	2020	
Peter Polin	United States	Wisconsin State Assembly	1870	
Donnie Landsman	United States	Richland City Council	2025	
Gary Ernst	United States	City Treasurer of Oceanside, California	2016	
