= National Committee to Preserve Social Security and Medicare =

American lobbying organization

- Formation: 18 November 1982
- Founder: James Roosevelt
- Type: 501(c)(4) advocacy organization with affiliated political action committee and 501(c)(3) foundation
- Location: Washington, D.C.
- Region served: United States
- President/CEO: Max Richtman
- Chair: Jim Crounse
- Revenue: $8.53 million (2025)
- Expenses: $7.95 million (2025)
- Website: www.ncpssm.org

The National Committee to Preserve Social Security and Medicare (NCPSSM) is a United States liberal advocacy group whose goal is to protect Social Security and Medicare. NCPSSM works to preserve entitlement programs through direct mail campaigns, candidate endorsements, incumbent ratings, grassroots activity, issue advertising, and campaign contributions.

NCPSSM promotes tax increases as a way to address what it describes as modest long-term issues with Social Security's solvency. The organization opposes Social Security privatization and supports prescription drug benefits in Medicare. Through its political action committee, the organization donates money to support Democratic candidates and to oppose Republican candidates.

== Overview ==
NCPSSM was founded in 1982 by former Congressman James Roosevelt, the eldest son of President Franklin D. Roosevelt. It is currently led by Max Richtman, former staff director of the Senate Special Aging Committee. The organization began as a direct mail organization which urged recipients to contact public officials and become dues-paying members. The NCPSSM eventually developed a professional research and lobbying capacity.

The majority of the organization's budget goes to direct mail campaigns. Most of the organization's income is raised through $12 annual membership fees paid by direct mail recipients, the majority of whom are senior citizens.

== Activities ==
NCPSSM supported passage of the Affordable Care Act. The organization opposed the passage of the Medicare Modernization Act of 2003 and the Republican Party's efforts to reform Social Security in 2005.

Through its political action committee (PAC), NCPSSM supports incumbents and challengers who it believes have demonstrated a strong commitment to preserving the current Social Security and Medicare systems. Voting records, campaign questionnaires and candidate interviews are considered when determining PAC support. NCPSSM has the wealthiest political action committee of all old-age organizations.

NCPSSM is a member of the Leadership Council of Aging Organizations, a coalition of American non-profit organizations interested in senior issues.

The NCPSSM supports lifting the Social Security payroll tax cap. The organization does not believe that there is a Social Security crisis.

In the 2020 presidential election, the group broke with tradition and endorsed a candidate, Democrat Joe Biden, citing the then current administration's attacks on Social Security.

== Criticism ==
The group's first fundraising appeal promised to send a printout of an individual's Social Security records in exchange for a $10 contribution. This solicitation tactic was met with criticism as the Social Security Administration provides such information for free. The organization halted this appeal.

In 1987, Social Security Commissioner Dorcas Hardy accused NCPSSM of using scare tactics to get money from elderly people afraid of losing their benefits. Later that same year, the group came under investigation by members of Congress who accused the organization of frightening the elderly about the safety of their Social Security benefits. A hearing was scheduled to address "misleading and deceptive mailings to Social Security beneficiaries."
