= Tim Rave =

Former South Dakota State Senator

Majority Leader of the South Dakota Senate
- In office September 30, 2013 – April 1, 2015
- Preceded by: Russell Olson
- Succeeded by: Corey Brown

Chair of the South Dakota Republican Party
- In office January 22, 2011 – February 9, 2013
- Preceded by: Bob Gray
- Succeeded by: Craig Lawrence

Speaker of the South Dakota House of Representatives
- In office January 2009 – January 11, 2011
- Preceded by: Thomas Deadrick
- Succeeded by: Valentine Rausch

Speaker pro tempore of the South Dakota House of Representatives
- In office January 2007 – January 2009
- Preceded by: Thomas Deadrick
- Succeeded by: Valentine Rausch

Personal details
- Born: Timothy Allan Rave; July 24, 1967 (age 59) Dell Rapids, South Dakota, U.S.
- Party: Republican
- Education: Canby Vocational College; Augustana University

Timothy Allan Rave (born July 24, 1967) is an American politician and a former Republican member of the South Dakota Senate representing District 25 from January 11, 2011, to April 1, 2015. Rave served consecutively in the South Dakota Legislature from January 2003 until January 11, 2011, in the South Dakota House of Representatives District 25 seat.

He was Speaker of the House. He is currently the Chairman of the Republican Party in South Dakota.

South Dakota House of Representatives
Preceded by Thomas Deadrick	Speaker pro tempore of the South Dakota House of Representatives; 2007–2009	Succeeded by Valentine Rausch
Political offices
Preceded by Thomas Deadrick	Speaker of the South Dakota House of Representatives; 2009–2011	Succeeded by Valentine Rausch
Party political offices
Preceded by Bob Gray	Chair of the South Dakota Republican Party; 2011–2013	Succeeded by Craig Lawrence
South Dakota Senate
Preceded by Russell Olson	Majority Leader of the South Dakota Senate; 2013–2015	Succeeded by Corey Brown
