= Charles X. Seward =

American politician

Member of the South Dakota House of Representatives
- In office 1891–1892
- In office 1901–1902

Speaker of the South Dakota House of Representatives
- In office 1891–1892
- Preceded by: Sutton E. Young
- Succeeded by: James Marshall Lawson

Member of the South Dakota Senate
- In office 1909–1910

Personal details
- Born: January 11, 1856 Marengo, Illinois, U.S.
- Died: October 12, 1912 (aged 56)
- Party: Republican

Charles X. Seward (January 11, 1856 – October 12, 1912) was an American politician. A member of the Republican Party, he served in the South Dakota House of Representatives from 1891 to 1982 and again from 1901 to 1902 and in the South Dakota Senate from 1909 to 1910.
