= Robert F. Ruth =

American politician (1921–2018)

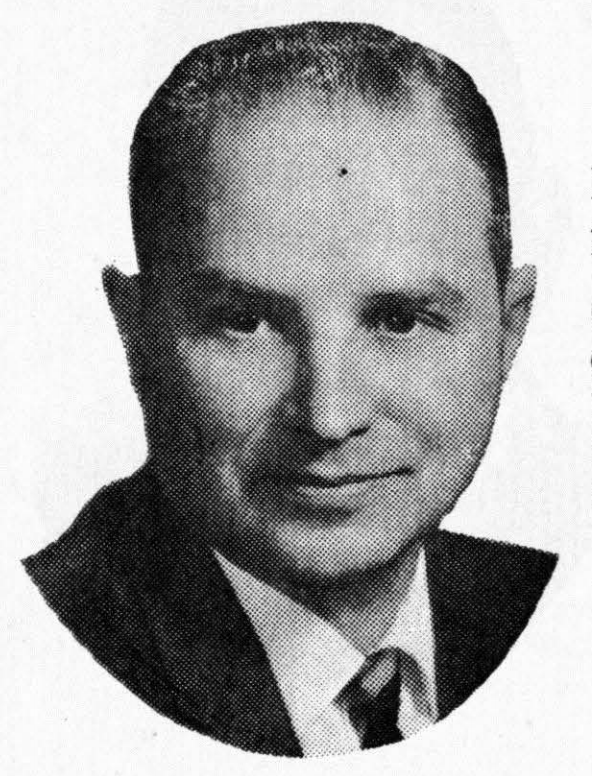
- Ruth in c. 1969

Member of the South Dakota House of Representatives
- In office 1969–1970

Personal details
- Born: March 4, 1921
- Died: December 3, 2018 (aged 97)
- Party: Republican
- Profession: Merchant

Robert F. Ruth (March 4, 1921 – December 3, 2018) was an American politician in the state of South Dakota. He was a member of the South Dakota State Senate. Ruth was appointed in 1969 by governor Frank Farrar after the winner of the election, D. O. Dillavou, died after the ballots for his seat were printed. He served in the United States Navy and was a commander in the United States Naval Reserve. He was also a merchant. He died in December 2018 at the age of 97, several months after the death of his wife Claramae.
