= Steve K. Cutler =

American politician

Member of the South Dakota House of Representatives
- In office 1985–2000

Speaker of the South Dakota House of Representatives
- In office 1993–1994
- Preceded by: E. James Hood
- Succeeded by: Harvey C. Krautschun

Personal details
- Born: June 2, 1948 (age 78) Britton, South Dakota, U.S.
- Party: Republican
- Education: South Dakota State University

Steve K. Cutler (born June 2, 1948) is an American politician. He served as a Republican member of the South Dakota House of Representatives.

== Life and career ==
Cutler was born in Britton, South Dakota. He attended South Dakota State University.

Cutler served in the South Dakota House of Representatives from 1985 to 2000.
