= Gwendolyn King =

American businesswoman

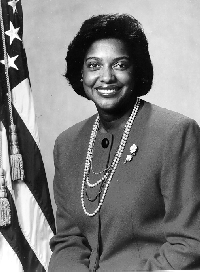

11th Commissioner of the Social Security Administration
- In office August 1, 1989 – September 30, 1992
- President: George H. W. Bush
- Preceded by: Dorcas Hardy
- Succeeded by: Louis Enoff (acting)

Director of the White House Office of Intergovernmental Affairs
- In office April 17, 1986 – May 2, 1988
- President: Ronald Reagan
- Preceded by: Deborah Steelman
- Succeeded by: Andy Card

Personal details
- Born: September 23, 1940 (age 85) East Orange, New Jersey, U.S.
- Party: Republican
- Spouse: Colbert I. King (m. 1961)
- Children: 3
- Education: Howard University (BA); George Washington University (MPA)

Gwendolyn S. King (born September 23, 1940) is an American businesswoman. From 1989 to 1992 she was the 11th commissioner of the U.S. Social Security Administration.

== Early life ==
King attended Howard University as an undergraduate, earning a Bachelor of Arts degree in French and education in 1962. She later attended the George Washington University for graduate courses in public administration.

== Career ==
King began her career teaching in Niagara Falls, New York and Washington, DC.

Beginning in 1971, she worked for the Department of Health and Human Services (then called the Department of Health, Education and Welfare).

From 1978 to 1979, she served as senior legislative assistant to Senator John Heinz.

In 1986, she was appointed Deputy Assistant to President Ronald Reagan and Director of the office for Intergovernmental Affairs.

In 1989, President George H. W. Bush appointed King as Commissioner of the Social Security Administration. King became the 11th Commissioner and the first black woman to hold the position. She served through 1992.

King is a retired member of the board of directors of Marsh and McLennan Companies, Lockheed-Martin Corporation and Monsanto Company. She is also formerly a director of Pharmacia. She is also a past director of the National Association of Corporate Directors.

== Awards ==
King has been awarded honorary doctorates from the University of New Haven, the University of Maryland-Baltimore County, and Howard University.

== Personal life ==
King is married to Colbert I. King, Washington Post columnist and the editorial page's deputy editor. The two met at Howard in the late 1950s and married in 1961. They have three adult children.

Political offices
| Preceded by Deborah Steelman | Director of the White House Office of Intergovernmental Affairs; 1986–1988; Served alongside: Mitch Daniels, Frank Donatelli (Political and Intergovernmental Affairs) | Succeeded by Andy Card |
| Preceded by Dorcas Hardy | Commissioner of the Social Security Administration; 1989–1992 | Succeeded by Louis Enoff; Acting |
