= D. O. Dillavou =

American attorney and politician (1936–1968)

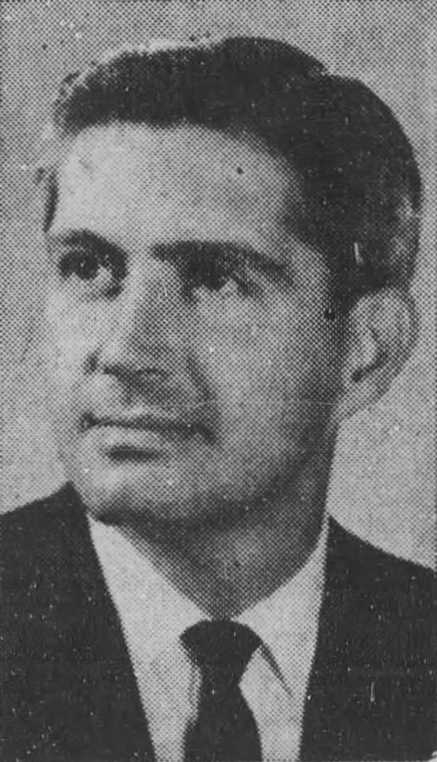
- Portrait of Dillavou, circa 1968

Member-elect of the South Dakota House of Representatives from the 3rd district
- Died before assuming office
- Preceded by: Joe Dunmire (as member)
- Succeeded by: Robert F. Ruth (as member)

State's Attorney of Lawrence County, South Dakota
- In office July 5, 1961 – January 10, 1967
- Preceded by: Larry D. McDonald
- Succeeded by: Ralph C. Hoggatt

Personal details
- Born: May 1, 1936 Deadwood, South Dakota, U.S.
- Died: October 29, 1968 (aged 32) Rapid City, South Dakota, U.S.
- Party: Republican
- Spouse: Linda Dewhirst (m. 1958)
- Children: 2

D. O. Dillavou (May 1, 1936 – October 29, 1968) was an American attorney and politician. Born in Deadwood in South Dakota, he graduated from Spearfish High School in 1954, where he played basketball. He then received a Bachelor of Science from the University of South Dakota in 1958. Dillavou earned his law degree from the university's School of Law, and he began practicing law a few months later after his admission into the state bar. In July 1961, he was appointed as the state's attorney of Lawrence County, following the resignation of Larry D. McDonald. Dillavou was re-elected to the position twice, in 1962 and 1964. Throughout his lifetime, Dillavou was an avid sportsman.

In March 1968, Dillavou announced his campaign for the South Dakota House of Representatives as a member of the Republican Party. He won the primary alongside James D. Jelbert. On October 29, 1968, Dillavou was mortally wounded in a traffic collision while driving along Interstate 90; he died a few hours later. Because ballot papers for the general election had already been printed, Dillavou's name was not removed from them. He ended up winning the election posthumously, placing second. In January 1969, Robert F. Ruth was appointed to fill Dillavou's term.

== Early life and education ==
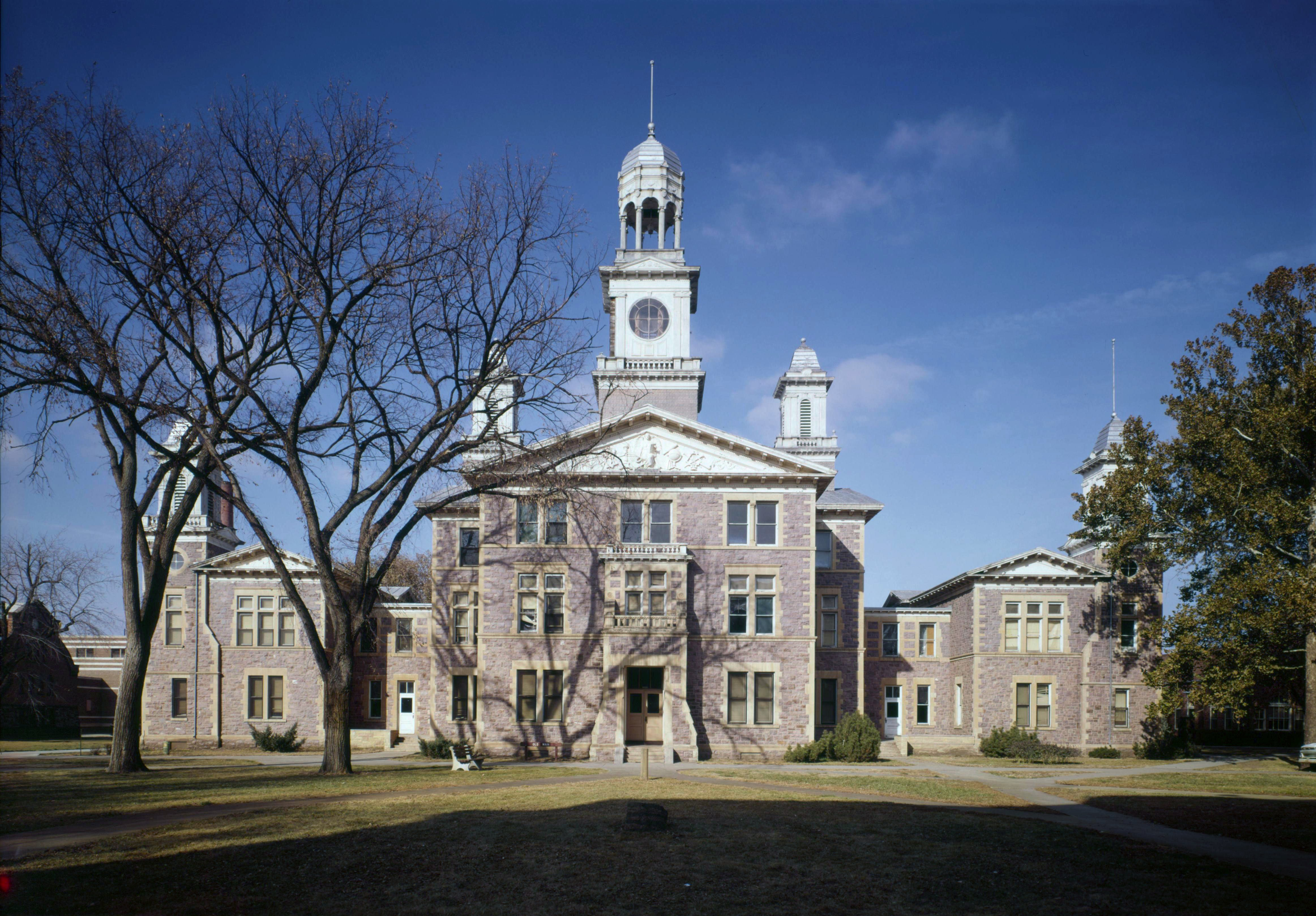
1976 photograph of the Old Main at the University of South Dakota, Dillavou's alma mater.

Dillavou was born on May 1, 1936, in Deadwood, South Dakota, to Jess and Valerie Dillavou. He completed his preliminary education in Spearfish and attended high school there too, graduating from Spearfish High School in 1954. While in high school, he was a player for its basketball team, the Spearfish Spartans. He was a student at the University of South Dakota and was awarded a Bachelor of Science in 1958. He later earned his law degree in June 1960 from the University of South Dakota School of Law. He married Linda Dewhirst, an employee at the University of South Dakota School of Business, on September 6, 1958, in Aberdeen, Dewhirst's hometown. Together, they had two children: Angela, daughter; and Jess, son. Upon wedding, the two settled in Vermillion; they later moved to Deadwood in 1960.

== Career ==
In August 1960, Dillavou was admitted to the South Dakota Bar after passing his examination the previous week in Pierre. He opened his first office the following month in Deadwood. In February 1961, Larry D. McDonald—the state's attorney of Lawrence County, who was recently hospitalized for an illness—appointed Dillavou as his deputy. McDonald later resigned from his post on June 29 due to his hospitalization and, on July 5, the Lawrence County Board of Commissioners appointed Dillavou as his successor. Dillavou decided to close his office in Deadwood and work from the county office full-time. Dillavou was elected to a full term in 1962 and re-elected in 1964. From 1963 to 1967, Dillavou held various leadership positions at Deadwood Elks Lodge No. 508. In 1965, he was named as an Outstanding Young Man of America and was a recipient of the Distinguished Service Award from the United States Junior Chamber in 1966. That same year, he began practicing law at Dillavou and Richards. The firm had locations in Spearfish and Deadwood. Dillavou chose not to run for re-election as state's attorney in 1966, and was succeeded by Ralph C. Hoggatt, who took office on January 10, 1967.

Dillavou was an avid sportsman. In January 1961, after graduating high school, Dillavou continued to play basketball, joining the Deadwood Jaycees team. He was master of ceremonies at the 47th annual Black Hills Rod and Gun Club smoker in April 1967. Later in the year, at the 1967 Elk-o-Rama Golf Tournament, Dillavou placed first, scoring 75 strokes in the final 18 holes. During the 1968 Tomahawk Open, held in July, Dillavou placed fourth in the championship flight. He had a score of 150, six-over-par. The following month during the Black Hills Open Golf Tournament, he scored 73, one-over-par, on the course in Lead. At the Lionsdilly Golf Tournament, also held in August, Dillavou and his teammate Gary Richards placed third, scoring 62. Dillavou placed fifth at the Elk-o-Rama Golf Tournament in September 1968, scoring 118 for 27 holes. Later in the month, he and Connie Olsen won a ball and chain tournament at the Tomahawk Country Club in Lead, scoring 46.

=== State legislature campaign ===
On March 19, 1968, Dillavou announced his campaign for the South Dakota House of Representatives, seeking to represent the 3rd district as a member of the Republican Party. The seat he was running for was held by 16-year incumbent Joe Dunmire. Dunmire would announce later in the month that he would retire from the House and instead seek a seat in the South Dakota Senate. In the Republican primary, he ran against James D. Jelbert, the incumbent legislator, and John R. King, the director of personal training at Homestake Mining Company. Both Jelbert and Dillavou ended up defeating King in the primary, held on June 4. In the general election, he was opposed by Democratic Party candidates Harry C. Hoffman and Maurice Scott. During his campaign, Dillavou was appointed as the chairman of Law Day USA, a program sponsored by the State Bar of South Dakota and was responsible for planning Law Day celebrations across South Dakota, on March 26. He was also elected as treasurer of the Deadwood Rotary Club on May 2; he began serving on July 1. In June 1968, Dillavou was named as one of the four vice presidents of the South Dakota Elks, representing western South Dakota. He also served as parade marshal of the 44th annual Days of '76 celebration, held in August 1968.

== Death and aftermath ==
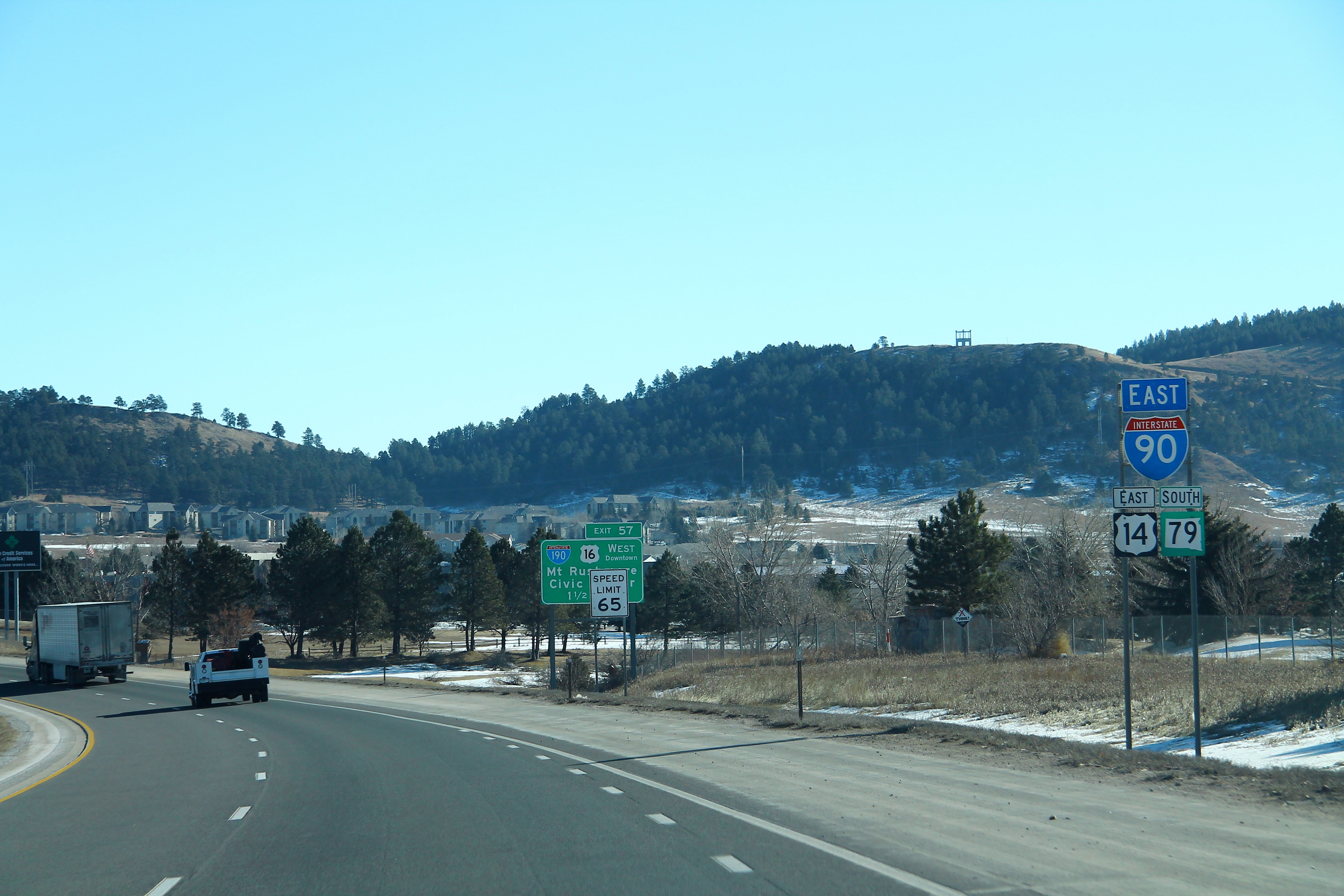
Dillavou was mortally wounded in a traffic collision south of Sturgis along Interstate 90 in South Dakota (pictured in Rapid City, 2020)

On October 29, 1968, at roughly 7:30 p.m., Dillavou was driving along Interstate 90 south of Sturgis when his vehicle went out of control and drove into a borrow pit. He was flung out of the vehicle and suffered severe head and internal injuries. Dillavou was taken to a hospital in Sturgis, then later to Rapid City, where he was pronounced dead at 9:30; Dillavou was alone in his car at the time of the crash. His funeral was held on November 1. The effect of Dillavou's death in the House race became a contested issue in South Dakota politics. Because the election ballots were already printed, Dillavou's name was not removed from them. Webb Weisenberg, the chairman of the Lawrence County Republican Party, encouraged people to still vote for Dillavou, stating that "He would not have wished to see a Democrat elected to the office for which he was running." The election of Dillavou would result in the party's committee to fill the vacancy. The chairman of the Lawrence County Democratic Party, Sever L. Eubank, disputed Weisenberg's claim, noting that the South Dakota Constitution does not mention how to fill a vacancy in the event of the election of a deceased person. Eubank did advocate, however, that if Weisenberg's theory was correct—in the event of Democrat Robert Chamberlin's victory in the 1968 gubernatorial election—he would support someone, possibly a woman, to fill the vacancy. Dillavou ended up winning the election, alongside incumbent James D. Jelbert, receiving 3,953 votes and placing second. On December 2, the central committee of the Lawrence County Republican Party selected Robert F. Ruth to fill Dillavou's vacancy in the House. In January 1969, Ruth was appointed to the House of Representatives as Dillavou's successor by governor Frank Farrar.

The cause of Dillavou's collision was debated in a $450,000 personal damage lawsuit filed by Bruce LaPlante, administrator of Dillavou's estate, in 1970. LaPlante's attorney, Joe Butler, alleged that highway patrolman Terry Mayes unlawfully cut across the median on Interstate 90 and into Dillavou's lane, causing the latter's traffic collision. William G. Porter, the attorney representing Mayes, had claimed that witnesses would testify that Dillavou was speeding, driving under the influence, and that he had "fallen asleep" at the wheel. Butler said that, before driving, Dillavou played gin rummy and had either one or two drinks with a friend, and later visited another bar where he had another drink. Butler further claimed that Mayes had failed to report to his supervisors that a witness he interviewed claimed that he had caused the collision. The trial opened on December 7, 1970, in the District Court for the District of South Dakota before Andrew Wendell Bogue. During the trial, Jon Mattson, a former law partner of Dillavou, stated that he had found brake marks on the highway as well as skid marks that were caused by Mayes's vehicle. Patrolman Dennis Esnick, who was assigned to the investigation of Dillavou's collision, denied that the brake marks lined up with the skid marks. On December 9, the jury ruled in favor of Mayes and no damages were granted to Dillavou's estate.

== Legacy ==
In May 1969, the Spearfish High School created the D. O. Dillavou Memorial Scholarship with a fund of $2,000, donated to by Jess and Valerie Dillavou. The scholarship was disbanded by the Spearfish School District in August 1982 and the remaining funds were given to Dewhirst. At the Tomahawk Country Club, the annual D. O. Dillavou Memorial Handicap Golf Tournament was held, beginning around 1969.

== Electoral history ==
1968 South Dakota House of Representatives' Lawrence County district Republican primary election
Party	Candidate	Votes	%
Republican	James D. Jelbert	2,725	45.27%
Republican	D. O. Dillavou	2,323	38.59%
Republican	John R. King	972	16.15%
Total votes		6,020	100.00%

1968 South Dakota's 3rd House of Representatives district general election
Party	Candidate	Votes	%
Republican	James D. Jelbert	4,012	32.67%
Republican	D. O. Dillavou	3,953	32.19%
Democratic	Maurice Scott	2,227	18.13%
Democratic	Henry C. Hoffman	2,089	17.01%
Total votes		12,281	100.00%
