= Debra R. Anderson =

American politician (1949–2022)

Deb Anderson

Director of the White House Office of Intergovernmental Affairs
- In office January 20, 1989 – January 24, 1992
- President: George H. W. Bush
- Preceded by: Karen Spencer; Frank Donatelli (Political and Intergovernmental Affairs)
- Succeeded by: Sherrie Rollins

Speaker of the South Dakota House of Representatives
- In office January 1987 – January 1989
- Preceded by: Donald Ham
- Succeeded by: Royal J. Wood

Personal details
- Born: June 13, 1949 Bryant, South Dakota, U.S.
- Died: November 10, 2022 (aged 73) Washington, D.C., U.S.
- Party: Republican
- Education: Augustana University (BA)

Debra Rae Anderson (June 13, 1949 – November 10, 2022) was an American politician.

Anderson was born in Bryant, Hamlin County, South Dakota, and graduated from Bryant High School in 1967. She then graduated from Augustana University in Sioux Falls, South Dakota, in 1971. Anderson served in the South Dakota House of Representatives from 1977 until her resignation in 1989; served as speaker of the South Dakota House of Representatives from 1987 until 1988. She was a Republican, Anderson then served during the administration of President George H. W. Bush. She died at her home in Washington, D.C., on November 10, 2022, at the age of 73.

Political offices
Preceded by Donald Ham	Speaker of the South Dakota House of Representatives; 1987–1989	Succeeded by Bud Wood
Preceded by Karen Spencer	Director of the White House Office of Intergovernmental Affairs; 1989–1992	Succeeded by Sherrie Rollins
Preceded by Frank Donatelli as White House Director of Political and Intergovernmental Affairs	Director of the White House Office of Intergovernmental Affairs; 1989–1992	Succeeded by Sherrie Rollins
