= Mark Sandy =

American government official (born 1960s)

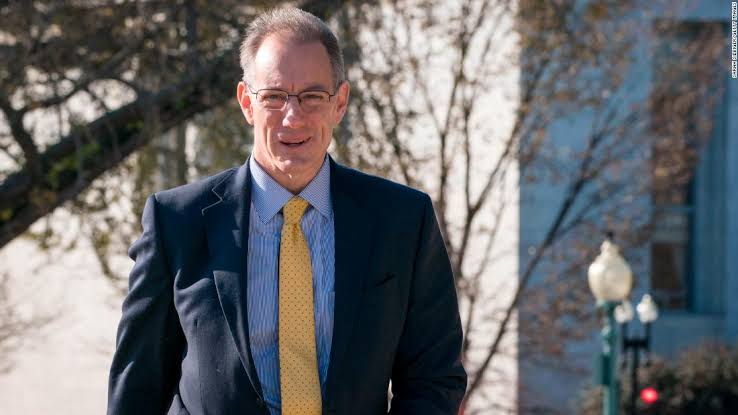

Director of the Office of Management and Budget
- Acting
- In office January 20, 2017 – February 16, 2017
- President: Donald Trump
- Preceded by: Shaun Donovan
- Succeeded by: Mick Mulvaney

Personal details
- Born: 1964 or 1965 (age 61–62)
- Relatives: Sherrie Rollins (sister)
- Education: Davidson College (BA); Lincoln College, Oxford (BA); Princeton University (MPA)

Mark Steven Sandy is an American government official who served as acting director of the Office of Management and Budget (OMB) from January to February 2017. As of November 2019, he was the Deputy Associate Director for National Security Programs at OMB.

== Early life and education ==
Sandy grew up in Greater Deyerle, Roanoke, Virginia, the youngest of three children. He completed high school at North Cross School in Roanoke, Virginia, graduating with the class of 1984 as valedictorian, having served as class president and chairman of the North Cross Honor Council. The school bestowed on him with Thomas Slack Award, named after a former headmaster, and awarded for "citizenship and strength of character."

At Davidson College, Sandy earned a bachelor's in politics and economics in 1987 and was president of the student government association. He went on to earn a second bachelor's in philosophy, politics and economics at Lincoln College, Oxford on a Marshall Scholarship that he'd won in 1985. He then earned a Master of Public Administration from the Woodrow Wilson School of Public and International Affairs at Princeton University in 1991 on a Truman Scholarship. After graduating, he was nominated for a Henry Luce Scholarship for a placement at the Institute for International Policy Studies in Tokyo from 1991 to 1992.

== Career ==
Sandy is a career official with the U.S. federal government. He has served under both Republican and Democratic administrations. By 2019 he had become a senior career official at the Office of Management and Budget, senior enough so that he served as acting director early in the Trump administration, before political appointees were hired. In testifying during the impeachment inquiry, Sandy became the first OMB official to meet with investigators after higher ranking political appointees fought subpoenas and refused to provide requested documents.

Sandy was signatory on at least one "apportionment letter" that delayed the release of military aid to Ukraine in 2019. On November 16, 2019, he testified in a deposition that Trump did in fact enact an unusual freeze in aid to Ukraine.

== See also ==
- Trump–Ukraine scandal
- Impeachment inquiry against Donald Trump

Political offices
Preceded by Shaun Donovan	Director of the Office of Management and Budget; Acting; 2017	Succeeded by Mick Mulvaney
