= Royal J. Wood =

American politician

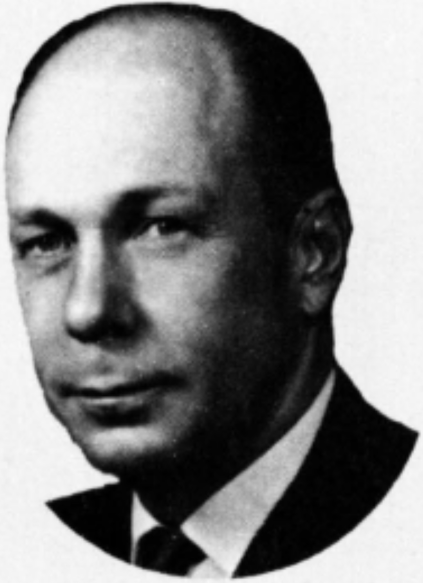
- Wood in 1971

Member of the South Dakota House of Representatives
- In office 1967–1992

Speaker of the South Dakota House of Representatives
- In office 1989–1990
- Preceded by: Debra R. Anderson
- Succeeded by: E. James Hood

Personal details
- Born: March 28, 1922 Aberdeen, South Dakota, U.S.
- Died: November 19, 2009 (aged 87)
- Party: Republican
- Education: Northern State College

Royal J. Wood (March 28, 1922 – November 19, 2009) was an American politician. He served as a Republican member of the South Dakota House of Representatives.

== Life and career ==
Wood was born in Aberdeen, South Dakota. He attended Warner High School and Northern State College.

Wood served in the South Dakota House of Representatives from 1967 to 1992.

Wood died on November 19, 2009, at the age of 87.
