= GOPAC =

Republican political training organization

- Industry: Politics
- Founded: 1978
- Founder: Governor Pete du Pont
- Headquarters: 1201 Wilson Ave Suite 2110 Arlington, VA 22209
- Key people: David Avella (chairman); Frank Donatelli (former chairman); Newt Gingrich (former Speaker of the House and GOPAC chairman)
- Revenue: $400,057 (2013)
- Website: www.gopac.org

GOPAC is a Republican (GOP) state and local political training organization. GOPAC operates as 527 organization while its affiliated PAC, the GOPAC Election Fund, is dedicated to assisting GOPAC-affiliated legislators running for office.

== History ==
GOPAC was founded by Delaware Governor Pierre S. du Pont, IV in 1978 in "an effort to build a farm team of Republican officeholders who could then run for congress or higher state offices later". On February 1, 2007, former Maryland Lieutenant Governor Michael Steele became the chairman and served until his election as chairman of the Republican National Committee in January 2009. The current chairman of GOPAC is David Avella.

Others who have chaired GOPAC include former Oklahoma Governor Frank Keating, former Georgia Representative and Secretary of the Army Bo Callaway, California Representative David Dreier, Arizona Representative John Shadegg, former Oklahoma Representative J.C. Watts, Gay Gaines, and former Speaker of the House Newt Gingrich of Georgia.

Instructional tapes used to train aspiring Republican politicians from 1986 to 1994 were selected by the Library of Congress as a 2010 addition to the National Recording Registry for their influence in "shaping political discourse". The Library of Congress selects recordings annually that are "culturally, historically, or aesthetically significant".

As of August 2026, the organization spent $16.7 million in support of Republican candidates in the 2026 United States elections.

== 1990 memo ==
Drawing rhetorical inspiration from Newt Gingrich, GOPAC wrote and distributed a memo to Republican Party legislative candidates in 1990. The memo, which came from a list drawn up by Frank Luntz, called "Language: A Key Mechanism of Control", contained a list of "contrasting words" and "optimistic positive governing words" that Gingrich recommended for use in describing Democrats and Republicans, respectively.

Words and phrases suggested for use against opponents included decay, failure, collapse, deeper, crisis, urgency, destructive, destroy, sick, pathetic, lie, radical, liberal, them/they, unionized bureaucracy, betray, consequences, limits, shallow, traitor, sensationalists, stagnation, pessimistic, red tape, and the idea that "compassion" is not enough.

Words to use in defining a candidate's own campaign and vision included freedom, dream, share, change, opportunity, legacy, challenge, control, truth, moral, courage, reform, prosperity, crusade, movement, children, family, debate, compete, active, we/us/our, candid, humane, pristine, provide and the idea to "eliminate good-time in prison".

The cover page of the memo said: "The words in that paper are tested language from a recent series of focus groups where we actually tested ideas and language."

The comic strip Doonesbury mentions the memo in a strip, calling it the "Magna Carta of attack politics." Al Franken, a comedian and later a U.S. senator from Minnesota, wrote that GOP candidates were drilled to adopt three basic techniques in debating: "Go Negative Early"; "Don't Try to Educate"; "Never Back Off". Minor details were relevant only to 'demolish the opposition'.
