= Thomas Deadrick =

American politician

Thomas J. Deadrick

Speaker of the South Dakota House of Representatives
- In office January 2007 – January 2009
- Preceded by: Matthew J.W. Michels
- Succeeded by: Tim Rave

Personal details
- Born: August 26, 1952
- Party: Republican

Thomas J. Deadrick is a former Republican member of the South Dakota House of Representatives, representing the 21st District from 2003 and 2011. He also served as the Speaker of the House. His district included Brule, Buffalo, Charles Mix, Jones and Lyman counties.
