= Valentine Rausch =

American politician

Val Rausch

Speaker of the South Dakota House of Representatives
- In office 2011–2012
- Preceded by: Tim Rave
- Succeeded by: Brian Gosch

Personal details
- Party: Republican
- Education: Northern State University

Valentine "Val" Rausch is an American politician who served as a Republican member of the South Dakota House of Representatives, representing the fourth district from 2005 to 2012. In 2011, Rausch was chosen by his peers to become the Speaker of the House. Previously, Rausch served as mayor of Big Stone City, South Dakota, from 1993 to 1999.

Rausch is a member of the American Legislative Exchange Council (ALEC), serving as South Dakota state leader.
