= Douglas Hoelscher =

American political aide

Doug Hoelscher
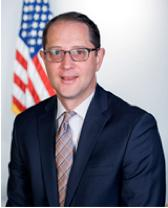

Director of the White House Office of Intergovernmental Affairs
- In office June 15, 2018 – January 20, 2021
- President: Donald Trump
- Preceded by: Justin R. Clark
- Succeeded by: Julie Rodriguez

Personal details
- Born: Douglas Lynn Hoelscher Williams, Iowa, U.S.
- Party: Republican
- Education: University of Iowa (BA)

Douglas Lynn Hoelscher is an American politician official who served as director of the White House Office of Intergovernmental Affairs in the first Trump administration.

== Early life and education ==
Hoelscher is a native of Williams, Iowa, and attended Northeast Hamilton High School in Blairsburg, Iowa. He then earned a Bachelor of Arts degree in political science from the University of Iowa in 1999.

== Career ==
After graduating from college, Hoelscher worked for the Republican Party of Wisconsin during the 2000 United States presidential election. In 2001, he became a political coordinator and scheduler for the White House Office of Political Affairs, serving under Ken Mehlman.

Hoelscher worked for the Republican National Committee in 2004, and later served as the director of the Iowa Office of State–Federal Relations in the administration of Terry Branstad. He chaired the National Governors Association 2016 Summer Meeting Committee in Des Moines, Iowa.

Hoelscher also worked at PricewaterhouseCoopers and as executive director of the Homeland Security Advisory Council during the George W. Bush Administration.

Hoelscher joined the Trump administration on February 14, 2017, as deputy director of intergovernmental affairs, and was promoted to director in June 2018. Hoelscher was replaced in the role by Julie Chávez Rodriguez upon the inauguration of Trump's successor Joe Biden on January 20, 2021.

Political offices
Preceded by Justin R. Clark	Director of the White House Office of Intergovernmental Affairs; 2018–2021	Succeeded by Julie Rodriguez
