= Harvey C. Krautschun =

American politician (1949–2026)

Member of the South Dakota House of Representatives
- In office 1985–1996

Speaker of the South Dakota House of Representatives
- In office 1995–1996
- Preceded by: Steve K. Cutler
- Succeeded by: Rexford A. Hagg

Personal details
- Born: July 15, 1949 Windsor, Colorado, US
- Died: January 1, 2026 (aged 76)
- Party: Republican
- Spouse: Joy Proctor (m. 1973; died 2013)
- Children: 2
- Education: Black Hills State University

Harvey C. Krautschun (July 15, 1949 – January 1, 2026) was an American politician. He served as a Republican member of the South Dakota House of Representatives from 1985 to 1996, serving as Speaker of the House between 1995 and 1996.

== Early life and career ==
Krautschun was born on July 14, 1949, in Brighton, Colorado, (Note: Some sources state Kraustchun was born in Windsor, Colorado; his obituary states Brighton.) to Harvey Krautschun Sr. and Iris Krautschun. He graduated from Windsor High School in neighboring Windsor before moving to Spearfish, South Dakota, to attend Black Hills State University. He graduated with a social sciences degree in 1972, after which he became an insurance agent for New York Life. He served on the New York Life council for 47 years.

Krautschun was elected to the South Dakota House of Representatives in 1984, replacing Kay Jorgensen of District 31. He assumed office in 1985. He was named speaker pro tempore in 1993 and subsequently became Speaker of the House in 1995, in which capacity he served until his retirement.

Krautschun retired from politics in 1996 after his wife suffered a farm accident the previous year. During the 2002 gubernatorial race, Republican Steve T. Kirby named Krautschun as his running mate for lieutenant governor, should Kirby be named the Republican candidate for governor; however, Kirby lost the nomination to Mike Rounds.

== Personal life and death ==
Krautschun married Joy Proctor on August 11, 1973, in Spearfish, South Dakota. They had two children together. The Krautschuns owned and operated a ranch outside of Spearfish; Harvey co-owned Two Tone Cattle Company with his son Bart. Joy died on November 5, 2013. He died on January 1, 2026, at the age of 76. Governor Larry Rhoden ordered flags be flown at half-mast on January 9 in his honor.
