= Charles C. Droz =

American politician (1924–2025)

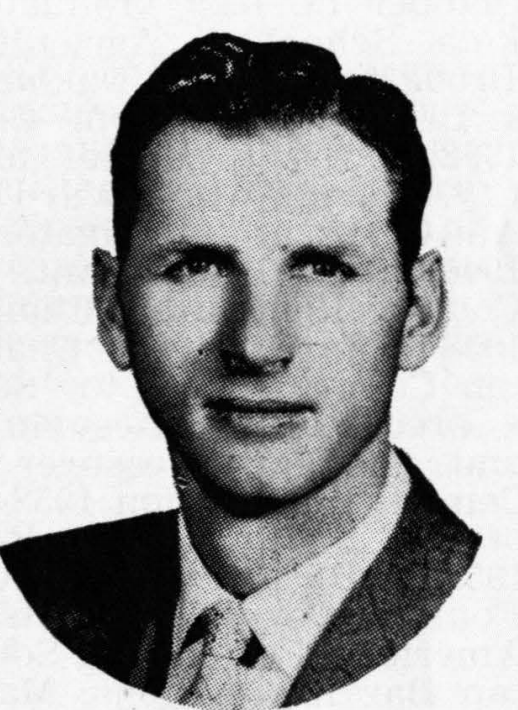

Member of the South Dakota House of Representatives for the 21st district
- In office 1957–1969

Speaker of the South Dakota House of Representatives
- In office 1965–1966
- Preceded by: Paul E. Brown
- Succeeded by: James D. Jelbert

Personal details
- Born: July 8, 1924 Miller, South Dakota, U.S.
- Died: July 22, 2025 (aged 101) Miller, South Dakota, U.S.
- Party: Republican
- Spouse: Fern Elizabeth Matre (m. 1948; died 2020)
- Children: 6
- Profession: farmer, rancher

Charles Clinton Droz (July 8, 1924 – July 22, 2025) was an American politician from Miller, South Dakota. He was a member of the South Dakota House of Representatives. He was an alumnus of South Dakota State University and a veteran of World War II serving with the United States Army. Droz was a farmer and rancher. He was married to Fern Elizabeth Matre since 1948, until her death in December 2020 at the age of 92. Droz died in Miller on July 22, 2025, at the age of 101.
