= Dexter H. Gunderson =

American politician

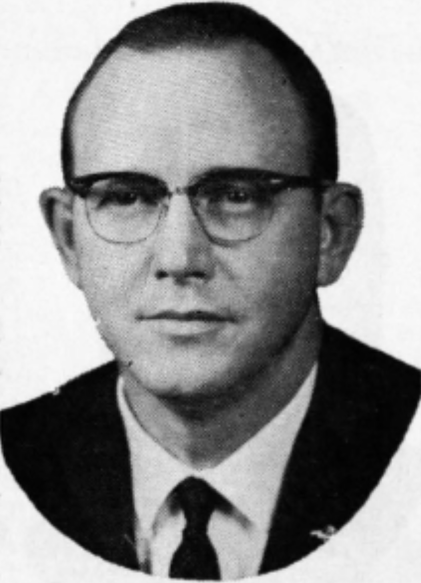
- Gunderson in 1965

Member of the South Dakota House of Representatives
- In office 1957–1958
- In office 1961–1970

Speaker of the South Dakota House of Representatives
- In office 1969–1970
- Preceded by: James D. Jelbert
- Succeeded by: Donald E. Osheim

Personal details
- Born: May 18, 1923 Irene, South Dakota, U.S.
- Died: November 22, 1989 (aged 66)
- Party: Republican
- Education: South Dakota State College; University of South Dakota

Dexter H. Gunderson (May 18, 1923 – November 22, 1989) was an American politician. He served as a Republican member of the South Dakota House of Representatives.

== Life and career ==
Gunderson was born in Irene, South Dakota. He attended South Dakota State College and the University of South Dakota.

Gunderson served in the South Dakota House of Representatives from 1957 to 1958 and again from 1961 to 1970.

Gunderson died on November 22, 1989, at the age of 66.
