= White House Office of Intergovernmental Affairs =

Unit within the U.S. president's office

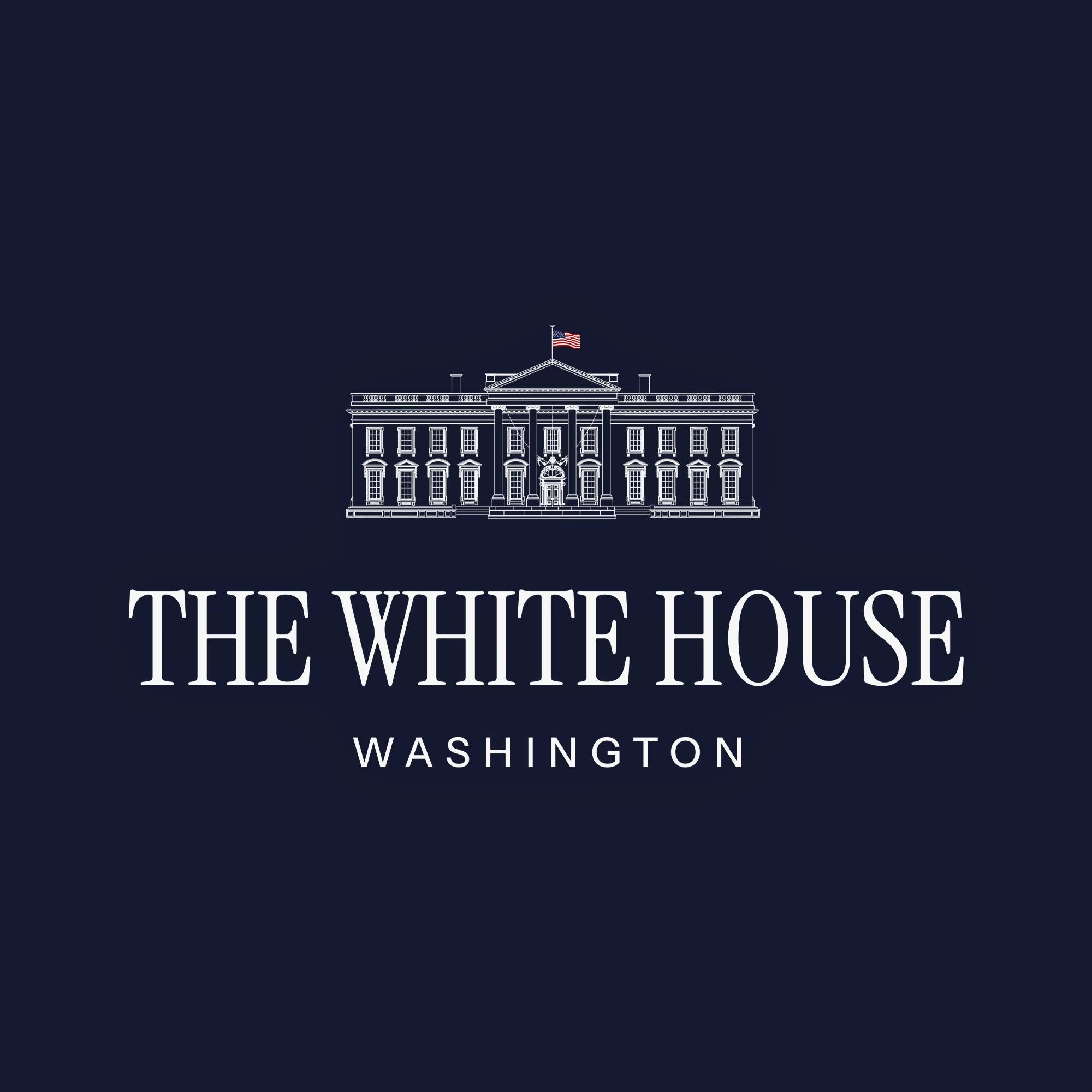

Agency overview
- Formed: 1955; 71 years ago
- Headquarters: Eisenhower Executive Office Building Washington, D.C., U.S.; 38°53′51.24″N 77°2′20.93″W
- Agency executive: Ashley Walukevich, Director
- Parent department: White House Office

The White House Office of Intergovernmental Affairs (IGA) is a unit of the White House Office, within the Executive Office of the President. It serves as the primary liaison between the White House and state, county (or county-equivalent), local, and tribal governments. The office focuses on building new and maintaining current relationships with governors, tribal leaders, mayors, state legislators, and county executives. The Office of Intergovernmental Affairs works with federal agencies and departments to ensure appropriate coordination between state, local, and tribal governments and the federal government.

== Origin ==
The Office of Intergovernmental Affairs was established in 1955 by President Dwight D. Eisenhower when he appointed former Arizona governor John Howard Pyle as Special Assistant to the President for Intergovernmental Affairs. The appointment followed the recommendations of the Kestnbaum Commission on Intergovernmental Relations, which had been established by Congress to study problems in the interactions between federal and state governments.

== List of directors ==
Name	Start	End	President	Ref.
Howard Pyle	February 1, 1955	January 31, 1959	Dwight D. Eisenhower (1953–1961)	
Unknown	January 31, 1959	January 20, 1961	Dwight D. Eisenhower (1953–1961)	
Unknown	January 20, 1961	November 22, 1963	John F. Kennedy (1961–1963)	
Unknown	November 22, 1963	January 20, 1969	Lyndon B. Johnson (1963–1969)	
Nils Boe	January 20, 1969	August 10, 1971	Richard Nixon (1969–1974)	
Hebert McCoy	August 10, 1971	August 9, 1974	Richard Nixon (1969–1974)	
Hebert McCoy	August 9, 1974	January 20, 1977	Gerald Ford (1974–1977)	
Jack Watson	January 20, 1977	June 11, 1980	Jimmy Carter (1977–1981)	
Gene Eidenberg	June 11, 1980	January 20, 1981	Jimmy Carter (1977–1981)	
Rich Williamson	January 20, 1981	May 17, 1983	Ronald Reagan (1981–1989)	
Lee Verstandig	May 24, 1983	March 26, 1985	Ronald Reagan (1981–1989)	
Mitch Daniels	March 26, 1985	October 1, 1985	Ronald Reagan (1981–1989)	
Deborah Steelman	October 17, 1985	April 17, 1986	Ronald Reagan (1981–1989)	
Gwendolyn King	April 17, 1986	May 2, 1988	Ronald Reagan (1981–1989)	
Andy Card	May 2, 1988	September 21, 1988	Ronald Reagan (1981–1989)	
Karen Spencer	September 21, 1988	January 20, 1989	Ronald Reagan (1981–1989)	
Deb Anderson	January 20, 1989	January 24, 1992	George H. W. Bush (1989–1993)	
Sherrie Rollins	January 24, 1992	January 20, 1993	George H. W. Bush (1989–1993)	
Regina Montoya	January 20, 1993	August 7, 1993	Bill Clinton (1993–2001)	
Marcia Hale	August 7, 1993	May 16, 1997	Bill Clinton (1993–2001)	
Mickey Ibarra	May 16, 1997	January 20, 2001	Bill Clinton (1993–2001)	
Ruben Barrales	January 20, 2001	December 28, 2006	George W. Bush (2001–2009)	
Maggie Grant	December 28, 2006	January 4, 2008	George W. Bush (2001–2009)	
Janet Creighton	January 4, 2008	January 20, 2009	George W. Bush (2001–2009)	
Cecilia Muñoz	January 20, 2009	January 10, 2012	Barack Obama (2009–2017)	
David Agnew	January 10, 2012	November 17, 2014	Barack Obama (2009–2017)	
Jerry Abramson	November 17, 2014	January 20, 2017	Barack Obama (2009–2017)	
Justin Clark	January 20, 2017	March 18, 2018	Donald Trump (2017–2021)	
Doug Hoelscher	March 18, 2018	January 20, 2021	Donald Trump (2017–2021)	
Julie Rodriguez	January 20, 2021	May 16, 2023	Joe Biden (2021–2025)	
Vacant	May 16, 2023	June 12, 2023	Joe Biden (2021–2025)	
Tom Perez	June 12, 2023	January 20, 2025	Joe Biden (2021–2025)	
Alex Meyer	January 20, 2025	June 5, 2026	Donald Trump (2025–present)	
Ashley Walukevich	June 5, 2026	present	Donald Trump (2025–present)	

=== Political and Intergovernmental Affairs ===
During the second term of the Reagan administration, there was a director of political and intergovernmental affairs who sat above the political director and intergovernmental affairs director.

Image	Name	Start	End	President
	Ed Rollins	February 5, 1985	October 1, 1985	Ronald Reagan (1981–1989)
	Mitch Daniels	October 1, 1985	March 1, 1987	Ronald Reagan (1981–1989)
	Frank Donatelli	March 1, 1987	January 20, 1989	Ronald Reagan (1981–1989)

=== Public Engagement and Intergovernmental Affairs ===
During the Obama administration, there was a director of public engagement and intergovernmental affairs who sat above the public engagement director and intergovernmental affairs director.

Image	Name	Start	End	President
	Valerie Jarrett	January 20, 2009	January 20, 2017	Barack Obama (2009–2017)
