= Justin R. Clark =

American lawyer (born 1975)

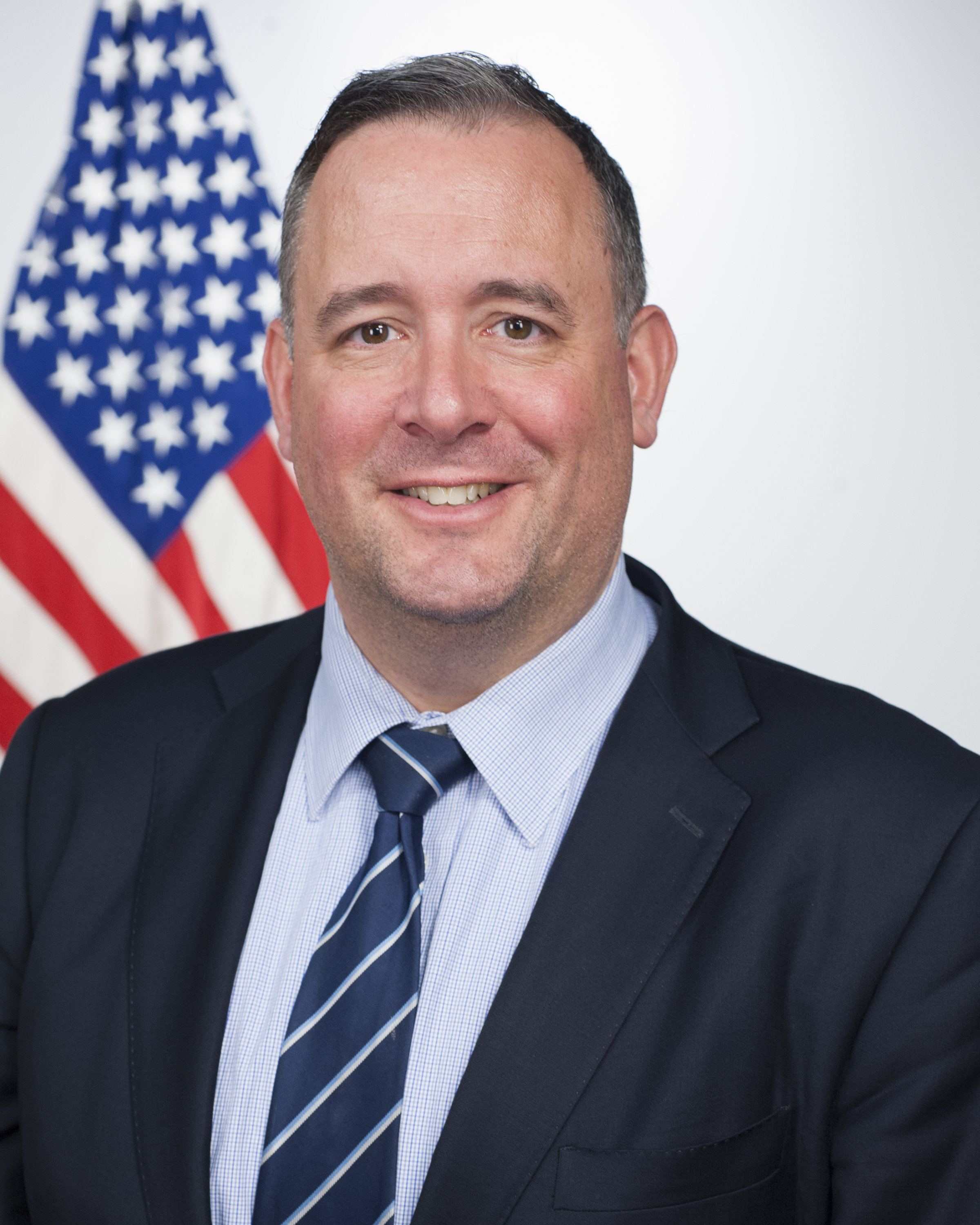

Director of the White House Office of Public Liaison
- In office March 18, 2018 – December 7, 2018
- President: Donald Trump
- Preceded by: Johnny DeStefano
- Succeeded by: Steve Munisteri (acting)

Director of the White House Office of Intergovernmental Affairs
- In office January 20, 2017 – March 13, 2018
- President: Donald Trump
- Preceded by: Jerry Abramson
- Succeeded by: Douglas Hoelscher

Personal details
- Born: Justin Reilly Clark; June 3, 1975 (age 51) Hartford, Connecticut, U.S.
- Party: Republican
- Education: Wesleyan University (BA); University of Hartford (MPA); University of Connecticut (JD)

Justin Reilly "JC" Clark (born June 3, 1975) is an American attorney, former government official, and former presidential campaign official for Donald Trump. He served as Director of Public Liaison and Director of Intergovernmental Affairs at the White House under the Trump administration. Prior to his government service, Clark was a partner at the law firm of Davis, Clark & Bonafonte LLC.

== Early life and education ==
Clark grew up in West Hartford, Connecticut, and attended Conard High School. He earned a Bachelor of Arts from Wesleyan University. Majoring in economics Clark invested a large part of his education in mathematics and statistical analysis that formed the basis of his approach to politics later in life. While at Wesleyan, he lettered as a midfielder and a defenseman for the varsity lacrosse team and was a member of the Delta Kappa Epsilon fraternity. He received his Juris Doctor from the University of Connecticut School of Law in 2004.

== Career ==
After graduating from law school, he clerked for Associate Justice Peter T. Zarella of the Connecticut Supreme Court and was appointed by Connecticut Governor Jodi Rell to serve on the Judicial Review Council from 2009 to 2013.

Clark was a co-founder of the Connecticut-based law firm Davis, Clark & Bonafonte LLC, where his practice focused on litigation in state and federal trial and appellate courts. He also provided general counsel services to clients, advised them on compliance matters, and represented them before various regulatory bodies. As a part of that practice he served various state and national campaigns and committees. He managed Tom Foley's unsuccessful gubernatorial campaigns in 2010 and 2014. He was also political director for Linda McMahon's unsuccessful 2012 United States Senate campaign. In both efforts Clark applied a data driven approach with a qualitative understanding of the electorate to lead his candidates to surprise wins at their respective state party conventions. In 2015, he worked on Matt Bevin's successful gubernatorial campaign in Kentucky where, among other things, he successfully developed and executed the plan to preserve an 83-vote margin in a recanvass of votes in the May primary.

Prior to joining the Donald Trump 2016 presidential campaign, Clark served as Director of Operations for the unsuccessful Chris Christie 2016 presidential campaign.

Clark was hired by Donald Trump's presidential campaign in March 2016 as the campaign's Connecticut state director, and later served as an advisor to the campaign during the Indiana Republican primary in May 2016. In June 2016, he was named Deputy National Political Director of the campaign and served in that capacity through the end of the election. In that role he developed and implemented a 50-state political and field strategy and during the 2016 Republican National Convention, served as one of the chief whips for the campaign on the rules committee and on the floor. Throughout the general election Clark condensed and applied analytics and polling data to help guide the team that directed spending and candidate travel. He later headed the campaign's recount efforts in Michigan and served as the chief whip for the campaign in the electoral college. After the election, Clark served on the Presidential transition team.

Clark became the President's Director of Intergovernmental Affairs on January 20, 2017. He was appointed the Director of Public Liaison in March 2018. In that role, Clark oversaw the political aspects of the nomination of Brett Kavanaugh to the U.S. Supreme Court. In December 2018, Clark and White House political director Bill Stepien were named Senior Political Advisors to the President's re-election campaign focusing on delegate and party organization. Clark is also Senior Counsel to the President's re-election campaign focused on compliance and election day operations. In 2019, Clark was surreptitiously recorded telling Wisconsin Republicans that "traditionally it’s always been Republicans suppressing votes in places" and that 2020 would be the time to "start playing offense a little bit" to protect their voters. In response to the recording, Clark said "Republicans historically have been falsely accused of voter suppression." In 2020, Clark was appointed as a member of the President's Commission on White House Fellowships. Clark was named Deputy Campaign Manager of the President's re-election campaign in July 2020.

In 2021, Clark and Jesse R. Binnall filed Donald Trump's appeal to the Washington, D.C. circuit court in a failed effort to thwart the release of documents relating to the 2021 United States Capitol attack. According to a court filing, on June 29, 2022, Clark was interviewed by the FBI related to the criminal contempt case of Steve Bannon, who was convicted of contempt of congress for defying a subpoena from the Jan. 6 select committee.

Political offices
| Preceded by Jerry Abramson | Director of the White House Office of Intergovernmental Affairs; 2017–2018 | Succeeded by Douglas Hoelscher |
| Preceded by Jerry Abramson | Director of the White House Office of Intergovernmental Affairs; 2017–2018 | Succeeded by Valerie Jarrett as Director of the Office of Public Engagement and Intergovernmental Affairs |
| Preceded by Johnny DeStefano | Director of the Office of Public Liaison; 2018 | Succeeded by Steve Munisteri; Acting |
