= Richard Norton Smith =

American historian

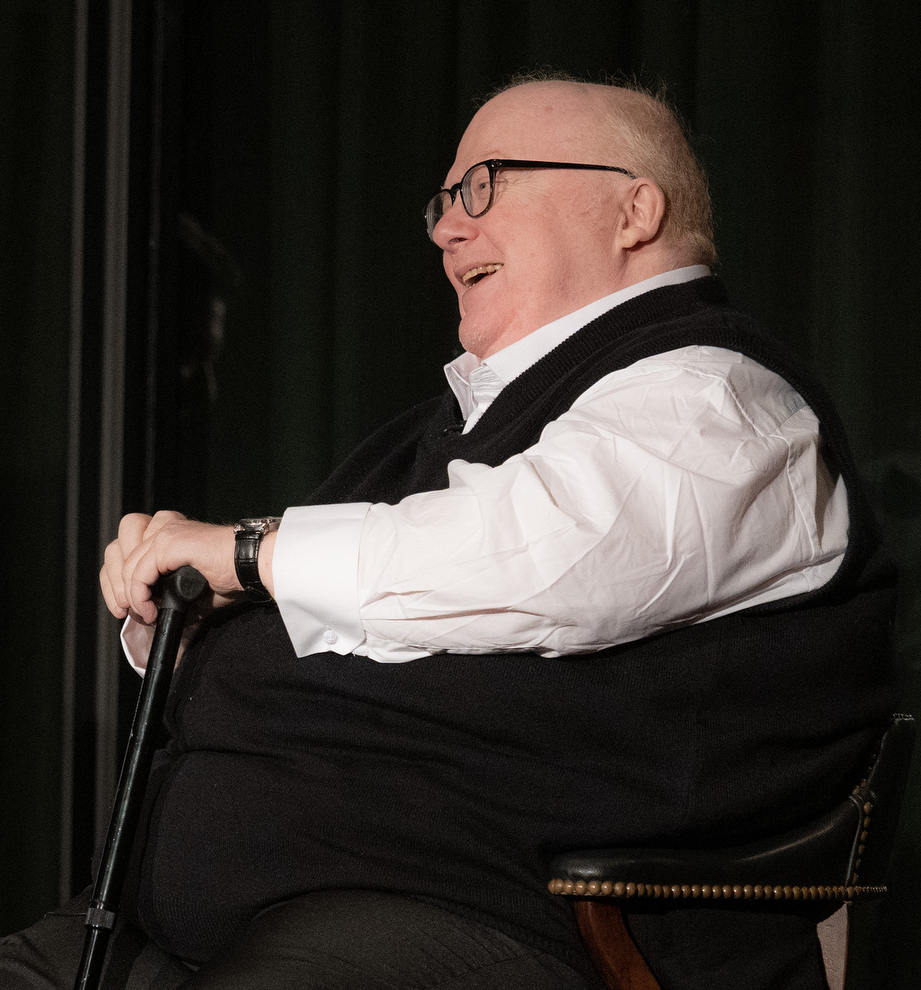
- Smith in 2023
- Born: October 2, 1953 (age 72); Leominster, Massachusetts, United States
- Education: Harvard University (BA)
- Writing career
- Genres: History, biography

Richard Norton Smith (born October 2, 1953) is an American historian and author, specializing in United States presidents and other political figures. In the past, he worked as a freelance writer for The Washington Post, and worked with U.S. senators Edward Brooke and Bob Dole.

== Early life and education ==
Born in Leominster, Massachusetts, in 1953, Smith graduated magna cum laude from Harvard University in 1975 with a degree in government. Following graduation he worked as a White House intern and as a freelance writer for The Washington Post. He became a speechwriter for Massachusetts Senator Edward Brooke and then Kansas Senator Bob Dole, with whom he collaborated on numerous projects over the years.

== Career ==
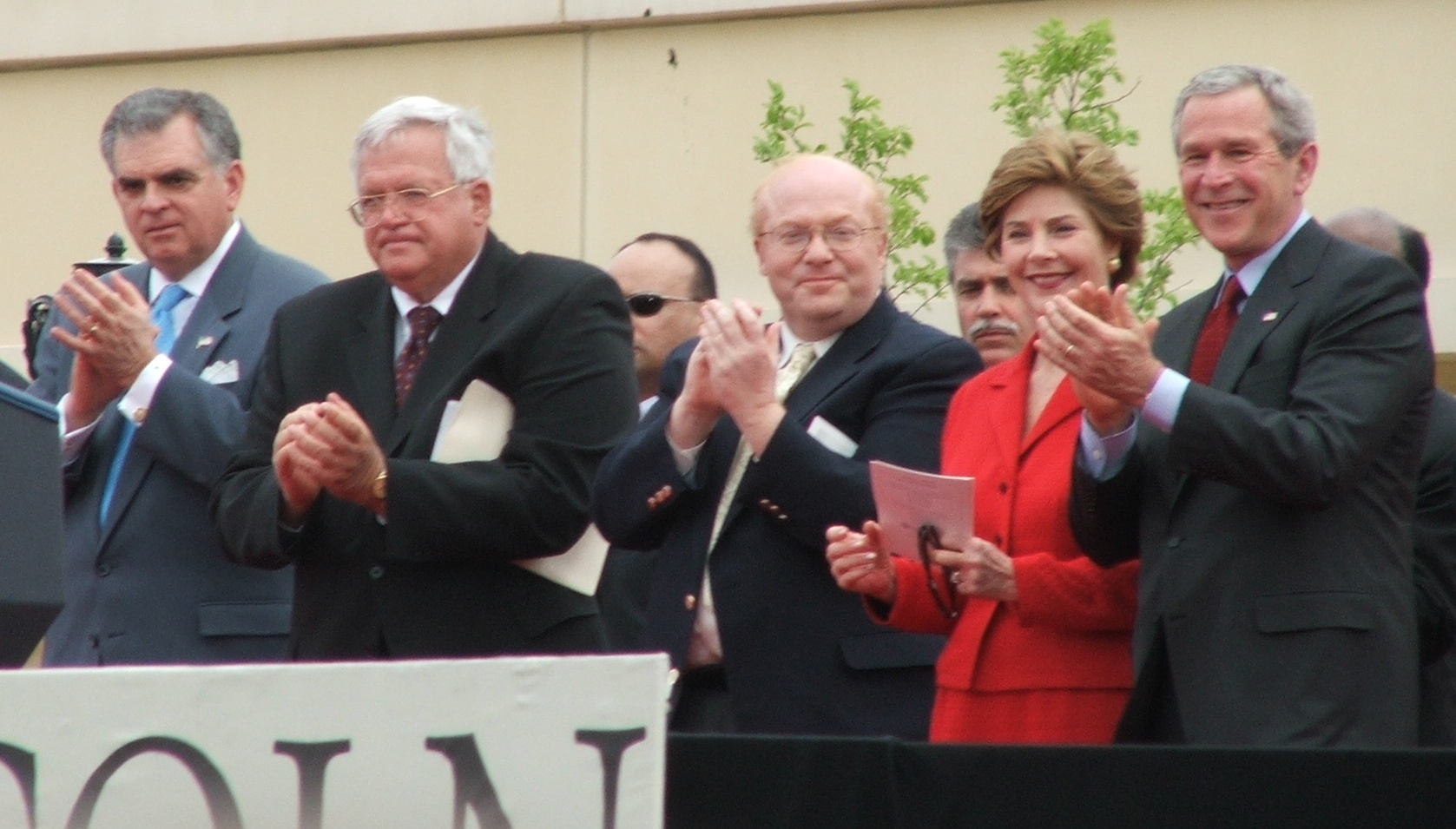
Smith with President George W. Bush, First Lady Laura Bush, Speaker Dennis Hastert, and Ray LaHood at the dedication for the Abraham Lincoln Presidential Library and Museum in 2005

Smith's first major book, Thomas E. Dewey and His Times, was a finalist for the 1983 Pulitzer Prize. He has also written An Uncommon Man: The Triumph of Herbert Hoover (1984); The Harvard Century: The Making of a University to a Nation (1986); and Patriarch: George Washington and the New American Nation (1993). His 1997 biography of Robert R. McCormick, The Colonel: The Life and Legend of Robert R. McCormick, received the Goldsmith Book Prize awarded by Harvard University's John F. Kennedy School of Government in 1998.

Between 1987 and 2001, Smith served as director of the Herbert Hoover Presidential Library and Museum in West Branch, Iowa; the Dwight D. Eisenhower Center in Abilene, Kansas; the Ronald Reagan Presidential Library, the Ronald Reagan Presidential Foundation and the Reagan Center for Public Affairs in Simi Valley, California; and the Gerald R. Ford Museum and Library in Grand Rapids and Ann Arbor, Michigan.

In 2001, Smith created Presidents and Patriots History Tours, leading a biannual series of historical tours emphasizing American presidents and history seldom found in textbooks. In December 2001, he became director of the Robert J. Dole Institute of Politics at the University of Kansas in Lawrence. There he supervised the construction of the institute's permanent home and launched a Presidential Lecture Series and other programs.

In October 2003, Smith was appointed the first executive director of the Abraham Lincoln Presidential Library and Museum, a four-building complex in Springfield, Illinois.

In 2009, Smith was invited by the U.S. Congress to be one of two historians addressing it on the two-hundredth anniversary of Abraham Lincoln's birth. Earlier, he delivered a eulogy at Gerald Ford's Michigan funeral, a role he repeated at Betty Ford's request when she was buried beside her husband in 2011.

In 2014, Smith published On His Own Terms: A Life of Nelson Rockefeller. Smith took 14 years to write the book and said that he spent about $250,000 of his own money on the project. In an interview with C-SPAN, he said that Random House provided an advance of $50,000 for the book.

Smith's most recent book, released in April 2023, is An Ordinary Man: The Surprising Life and Historic Presidency of Gerald R. Ford.

== Bibliography ==
Title	Year	ISBN	Publisher	Subject matter	Interviews, presentations, and reviews	Comments
Thomas E. Dewey and His Times	1982	ISBN 9780671417413	Simon & Schuster	Thomas E. Dewey		
Uncommon Man: The Triumph of Herbert Hoover	1984	ISBN 9780671460341	Simon & Schuster	Herbert Hoover	Q&A interview with Smith on An Uncommon Man, September 16, 2018, C-SPAN	
Patriarch: George Washington and the New American Nation	1993	ISBN 9780395524428	Houghton Mifflin	George Washington	Booknotes interview with Smith on Patriarch, February 21, 1993, C-SPAN; Interview with Smith on Patriarch, September 17, 1998, C-SPAN	
The Colonel: The Life and Legend of Robert R. McCormick	1997	ISBN 9780395533796	Houghton Mifflin	Robert R. McCormick	Presentation by Smith on The Colonel, June 16, 1997, C-SPAN; Presentation by Smith on The Colonel, December 2, 1997, C-SPAN	
On His Own Terms: A Life of Nelson Rockefeller	2014	ISBN 9780375505805	Random House	Nelson Rockefeller	Q&A interview with Smith on On His Own Terms, October 19, 2014, C-SPAN; Presentation by Smith on On His Own Terms, October 27, 2014, C-SPAN	
An Ordinary Man: The Surprising Life and Historic Presidency of Gerald R. Ford	2023	ISBN 9780062684165	HarperCollins	Gerald Ford	Interview with Smith during his writing of An Ordinary Man, June 24, 2016, C-SPAN; Q&A interview with Smith on An Ordinary Man, April 30, 2023, C-SPAN	
