= Julie Chávez Rodriguez =

American activist (born 1978)

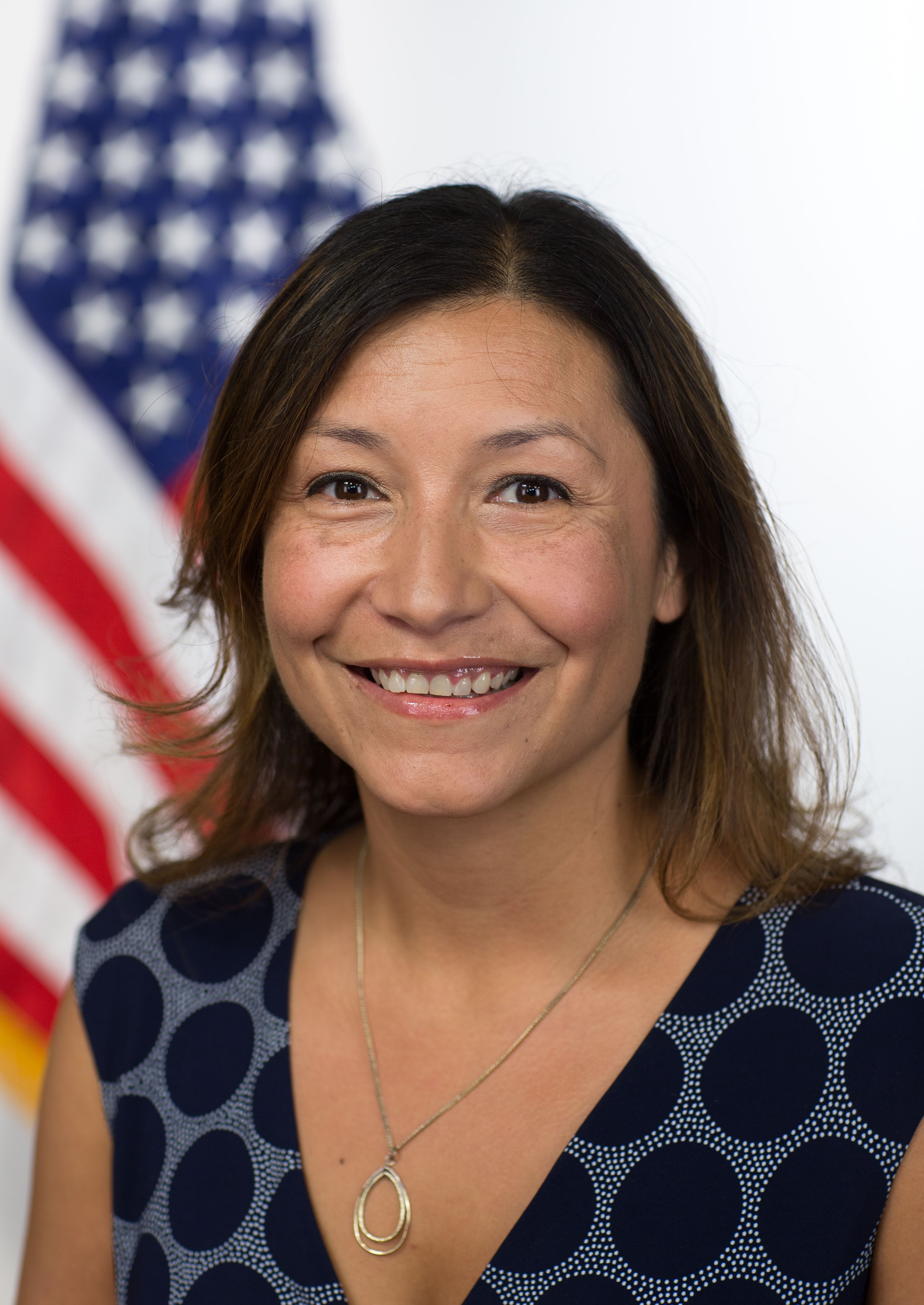
- Official portrait, 2015

Senior Advisor to the President
- In office June 15, 2022 – May 16, 2023
- President: Joe Biden
- Preceded by: Cedric Richmond
- Succeeded by: Tom Perez (Note: Also succeeds Neera Tanden)

Director of the White House Office of Intergovernmental Affairs
- In office January 20, 2021 – May 16, 2023
- President: Joe Biden
- Deputy: Gabe Amo
- Preceded by: Douglas Hoelscher
- Succeeded by: Tom Perez

Personal details
- Born: April 7, 1978 (age 48) Delano, California, U.S.
- Party: Democratic
- Relatives: Cesar Chávez (grandfather); Helen Fabela Chávez (grandmother)
- Education: University of California, Berkeley (BA)

Julie Chávez Rodriguez (born April 7, 1978) is an American former political consultant and was the campaign manager for Vice President Kamala Harris' 2024 presidential campaign, transitioning to that role from President Joe Biden's 2024 re-election campaign.

From 2008 to 2016, Chávez Rodriguez served in the Obama administration, initially working for the United States Secretary of the Interior and later in the White House Office of Public Engagement. In 2016, She was appointed state director for Senator Kamala Harris and from 2017 to 2019 served on Harris’s 2020 presidential campaign. In 2020, Biden, the eventual Democratic presidential nominee, hired Chávez Rodriguez as senior advisor for Latino outreach in his presidential campaign. In 2021, Chávez Rodriguez was appointed to be the director of Biden's White House Office of Intergovernmental Affairs. In 2022, she was appointed senior advisor to the president, and, in 2023, as his campaign manager.

== Early life and education ==
Rodriguez was born in Delano, California. She was raised in Tehachapi in a family of well-known labor activists affiliated with the United Farm Workers of America organization. She is the daughter of Linda Chávez Rodriguez and Arturo Rodriguez, and the granddaughter of American labor activist, Helen Fabela Chávez, and American labor leader, César Chávez. Her parents were full time volunteers for the UFWA. Rodriguez would often attend labor rallies with her parents and grandparents and assist them in UFWA community outreach activities.

Rodriguez attended Tehachapi High School, and later attended the University of California, Berkeley, where she received a bachelor's degree in Latin American Studies in 2000.

During her summer breaks, Rodriguez worked at the AFL–CIO. She also spent summers volunteering with the UFWA, organizing strawberry pickers in Watsonville, California.

== Career ==
From 2001 to 2008, Rodriguez worked as a program director at the Cesar Chavez Foundation.

=== Obama administration ===
Rodriguez worked as a full-time volunteer for Barack Obama's 2008 presidential campaign in Colorado. In 2009, Rodriguez was hired by the Obama administration, initially working as Director of Youth Employment and later as Deputy Press Secretary to former United States Secretary of the Interior, Ken Salazar.

From 2011 to 2017, Rodriguez served in the Obama administration in its White House Office of Public Engagement as deputy director of public engagement and later served as Special Assistant to the President. Her work as deputy director initially involved immigration and Latino outreach and evolved into the management of the White House's outreach program to Latino, LGBT, veteran, Asian American and Pacific Islander, Muslim, youth, education and progressive communities.

=== Kamala Harris posts ===
On December 11, 2016, Rodriguez was appointed by California Senator Kamala Harris to serve as her state director. In 2017, Rodriguez was hired by Harris' 2020 presidential campaign and served on it until Harris withdrew her candidacy in late 2019. Rodriguez initially served as co-national political director and later took on the role of the campaign's traveling chief of staff.

=== Biden administration ===
In 2020, Rodriguez was hired by Joe Biden's 2020 presidential campaign as senior advisor to oversee Latino outreach. She was the highest-ranking Latina who worked for the campaign.

On January 20, 2021, Rodriguez began her appointment as director of the White House Office of Intergovernmental Affairs.

On June 15, 2022, ahead of the 2022 midterm elections, Biden promoted her to be a senior advisor to the president, a senior staff position.

On April 25, 2023, it was announced that Rodriguez would serve as Campaign Manager of Biden's 2024 presidential campaign, with Quentin Fulks as Principal Deputy Campaign Manager. This is the first time a Latina and African American man were selected to run the campaign of an incumbent president. On May 16, 2023, she was replaced as director of the White House Office of Intergovernmental Affairs by Tom Perez.

== See also ==
- Cesar Chavez
- Sí se puede

== Notes ==
Political offices
Preceded by Douglas Hoelscher	Director of the White House Office of Intergovernmental Affairs; 2021–2023	Succeeded by Tom Perez
