= David Westin =

American news anchor

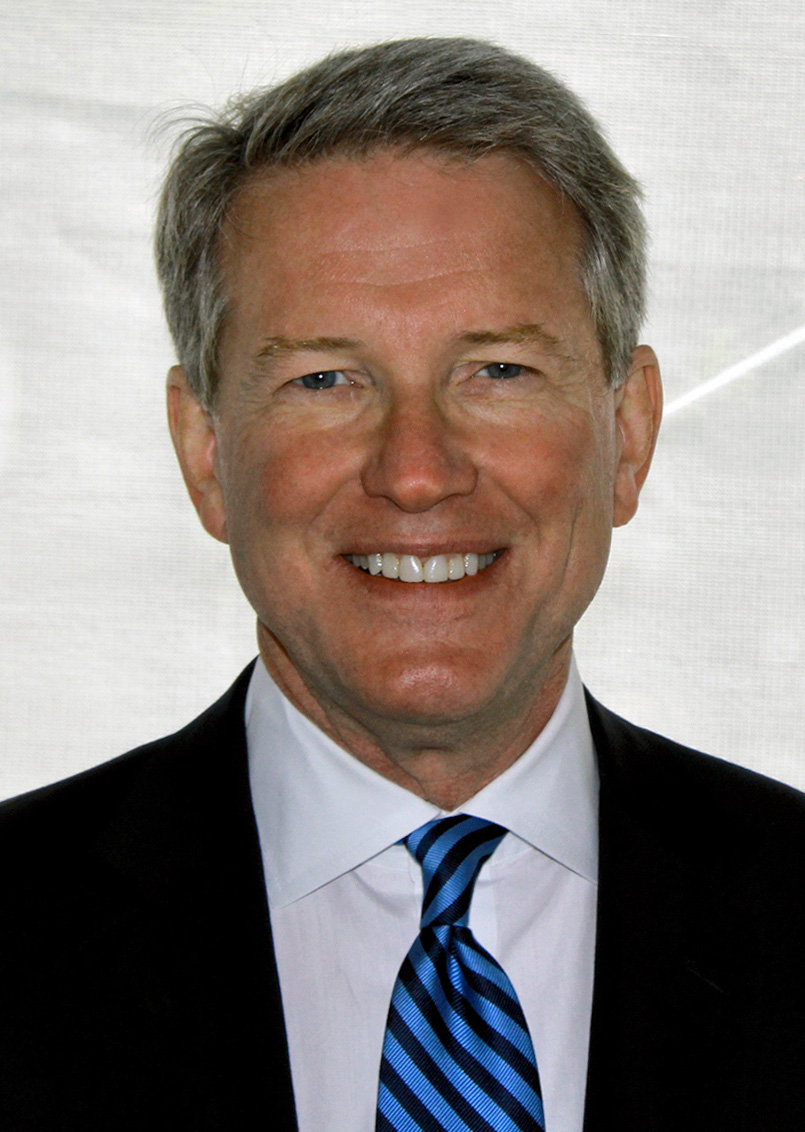
- David Westin at the 2012 Texas Book Festival
- Born: July 29, 1952 (age 74); Flint, Michigan
- Education: University of Michigan (J.D.)
- Occupations: News anchor, former news executive
- Spouse(s): Martha Johnson (divorced); Victoria Peters (divorced); Sherrie Rollins Westin
- Website: www.bloomberg.com/personalities/david-westin

David Lawrence Westin is anchor of Bloomberg Wall Street Week on Bloomberg Television. Previously, he was an anchor on Bloomberg Balance of Power, Bloomberg Daybreak Americas and Bloomberg GO which Daybreak replaced. He has anchored for Bloomberg since 2015. From 1997 to 2010, he was president of ABC News. From 2014 to 2015, he was principal of Witherbee Holdings, LLC, advising and investing in media companies. He was the president and CEO of NewsRight from 2011 to 2012.

== Biography ==
Westin was raised in Flint, Michigan, the son of a tool-and-die maker at AC Spark Plug. His father earned a college degree taking night classes and after graduation he took a management position at Ford’s plastics plant in Saline, Michigan. The Westins then moved to Ann Arbor, Michigan, where Westin graduated from Pioneer High School. in 1970. He received a BA degree with honors and distinction from the University of Michigan, and a JD degree, summa cum laude, from the University of Michigan Law School in 1977. After graduation, he served as a law clerk to J. Edward Lumbard of the United States Court of Appeals for the Second Circuit, and later clerked for Lewis F. Powell of the Supreme Court of the United States from 1978 to 1979.

Westin has written the book Exit Interview, about his experiences as president of ABC News. It was released in May 2012.

=== ABC News ===
He was president of ABC News (from March 6, 1997, through December 3, 2010), responsible for all aspects of ABC News’ television broadcasts, including World News with Diane Sawyer, Nightline, Good Morning America, 20/20, Primetime, This Week with Christiane Amanpour, and World News Now, and ABC News Radio. During his tenure, ABC News received eleven George Foster Peabody Awards, 13 Alfred I DuPont Awards, four George Polk Awards, more than 40 News and Documentary Emmys, and more than 40 Edward R. Murrow Awards. On September 6, 2010, Westin announced he would retire from ABC, but would remain until the end of the year to give the company time to find a replacement. One news report said Westin was forced out by Disney CEO Robert Iger, but others reported that he had decided to pursue other interests—with one saying that he "got to announce his departure on his own terms".

=== Personal life ===
Westin has been married three times. His first wife was Martha (Stubbins) Johnson; they had two daughters, Victoria and Elizabeth. His second wife was Victoria Peters; they had one son, Matthew. Westin is currently married to Sherrie (née Sandy) Rollins Westin. She has an adopted daughter, Lily, from a previous marriage to political strategist Ed Rollins. They have a son, David Palmer, from their union. He is also a grandfather of three.

== See also ==
- List of law clerks for the first seat of the Supreme Court of the United States

== Selected publications ==
- Westin, David (2012). Exit Interview. New York: Sarah Crichton Books. ISBN 9781466815568.
