= Joseph H. Barnett =

American politician

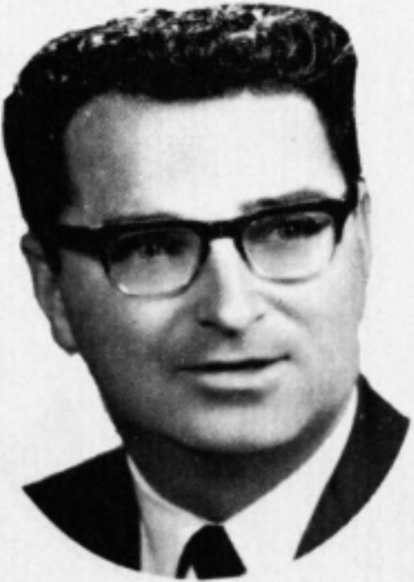
- Barnett in 1971

Member of the South Dakota House of Representatives
- In office 1967–1985

Speaker of the South Dakota House of Representatives
- In office 1975–1976
- Preceded by: Gene N. Lebrun
- Succeeded by: Lowell C. Hansen II

Personal details
- Born: November 3, 1931 Sioux Falls, South Dakota, U.S.
- Died: May 1, 1985 (aged 53) Aberdeen, South Dakota, U.S.
- Party: Republican
- Relatives: Steve Barnett (grandson)
- Education: Augustana College; College of St. Thomas; University of South Dakota School of Law

Joseph H. Barnett (November 3, 1931 – May 1, 1985) was an American politician. He served as a Republican member of the South Dakota House of Representatives.

== Life and career ==
Barnett was born in Sioux Falls, South Dakota. He attended Augustana College. He also attended the College of St. Thomas, earning his undergraduate degree and the University of South Dakota School of Law, earning his law degree.

Barnett served in the South Dakota House of Representatives from 1967 to 1985, and was the speaker of the House from 1975 to 1976.

== Death ==
Barnett died on May 1, 1985, at his home in Aberdeen, South Dakota, at the age of 53.
