= Gene N. Lebrun =

American politician (1939–2023)

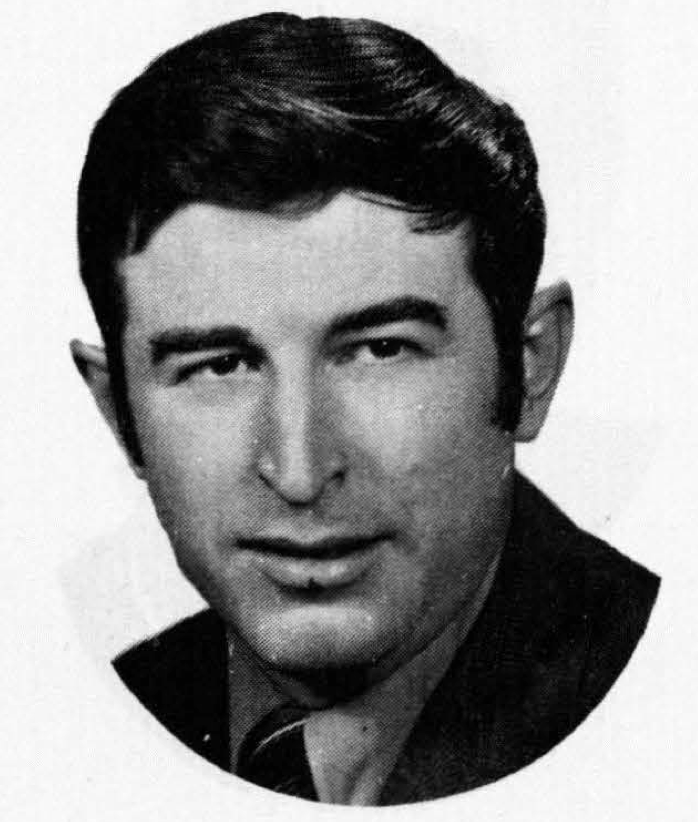

Member of the South Dakota House of Representatives
- In office 1971–1974

Speaker of the South Dakota House of Representatives
- In office 1973–1974
- Preceded by: Donald E. Osheim
- Succeeded by: Joseph H. Barnett

Personal details
- Born: July 4, 1939 Langdon, North Dakota
- Died: July 23, 2023 (aged 84)
- Party: Democratic
- Profession: Lawyer

Gene N. Lebrun (July 4, 1939 – July 23, 2023) was a U.S. politician in the state of South Dakota. He was a member of the South Dakota State House of Representatives. Lebrun attended the College of Saint Benedict and Saint John's University and University of North Dakota and later became a lawyer. He served as Speaker of the South Dakota House of Representatives from 1973 to 1974.
