= Donald E. Osheim =

American politician

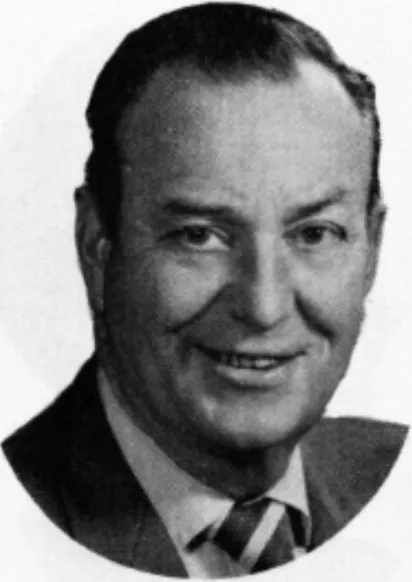
- Osheim in 1971

Member of the South Dakota House of Representatives
- In office 1965–1972

Speaker of the South Dakota House of Representatives
- In office 1971–1972
- Preceded by: Dexter H. Gunderson
- Succeeded by: Gene N. Lebrun

Personal details
- Born: August 20, 1919 Rosholt, South Dakota, U.S.
- Died: July 12, 2003 (aged 83)
- Party: Republican
- Education: University of South Dakota

Donald E. Osheim (August 20, 1919 – July 12, 2003) was an American politician. He served as a Republican member of the South Dakota House of Representatives.

== Life and career ==
Osheim was born in Rosholt, South Dakota, to Lawrence C. Osheim and Anna Osheim. He attended high-school in Rosholt graduating in 1937.

He then went to serve in World War II as a Navy Air Corps pilot.

After the war Osheim went to the University of South Dakota to obtain his law degree in 1948. He was admitted to the bar February 1848 with ten other graduates. He started practicing law as the city attorney of Watertown, South Dakota, a position he served from 1952 until 1886.

Osheim served in the South Dakota House of Representatives from 1965 to 1972 and was speaker of the House from 1971 to 1972 in his final session.

In 1986 he moved with his wife to Bella Vista, Arkansas, then later in 2000 to Sioux Falls, South Dakota. Osheim died on July 12, 2003, at the age of 83, survived by his wife Reva and three children.
