= Scott G. Eccarius =

American politician

Member of the South Dakota House of Representatives
- In office 1997–2002

Speaker of the South Dakota House of Representatives
- In office 2001–2002
- Preceded by: Roger W. Hunt
- Succeeded by: Matt Michels

Personal details
- Born: January 4, 1961 (age 65) Sioux Falls, South Dakota, U.S.
- Party: Republican
- Education: University of Southern California; University of South Dakota School of Medicine

Scott G. Eccarius (born January 4, 1961) is an American politician. He served as a Republican member of the South Dakota House of Representatives.

== Life and career ==
Eccarius was born in Sioux Falls, South Dakota. He attended the University of Southern California and the University of South Dakota School of Medicine.

Eccarius served in the South Dakota House of Representatives from 1997 to 2002.
