= Matt Michels =

38th Lieutenant Governor of South Dakota

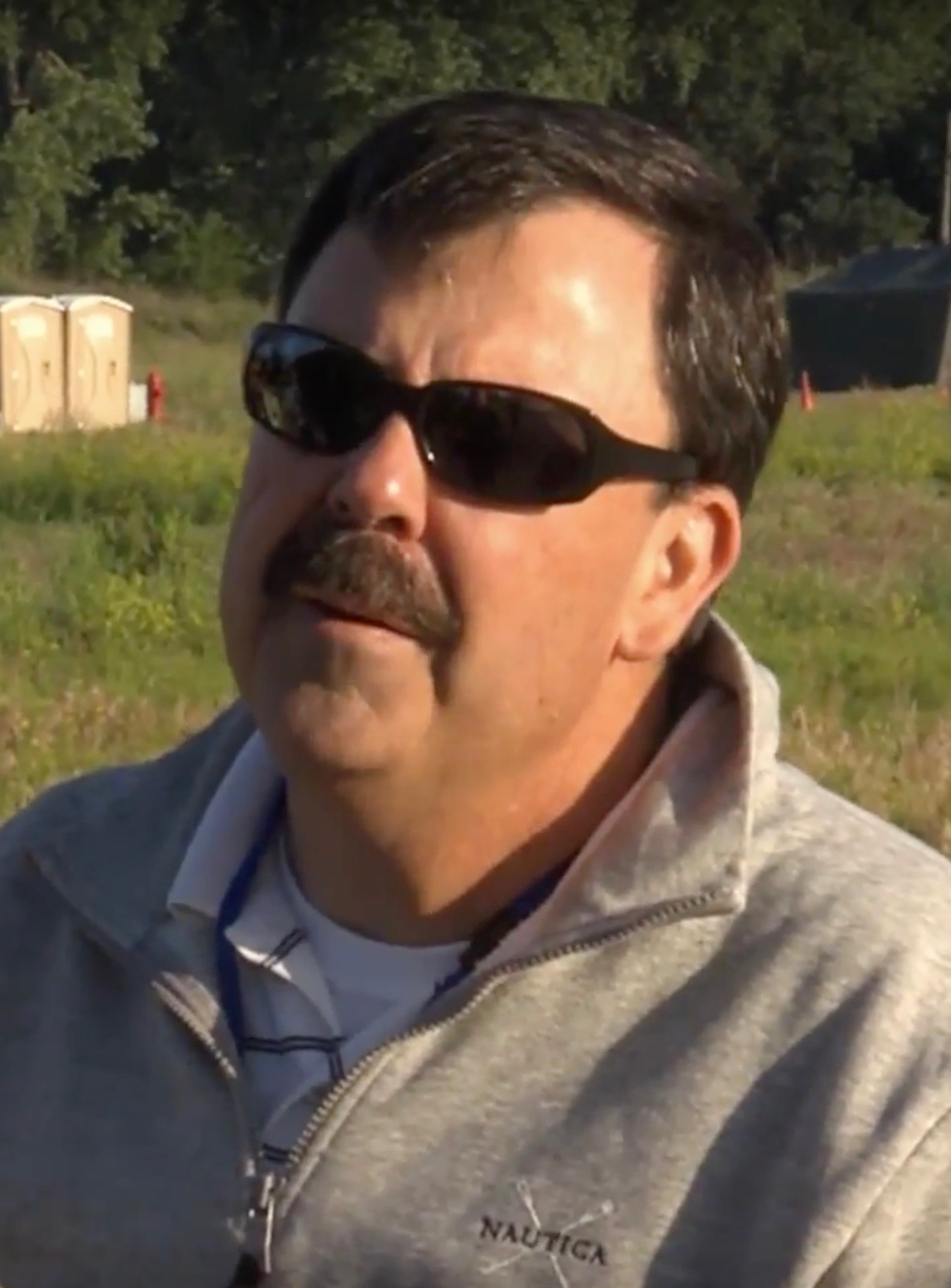

38th Lieutenant Governor of South Dakota
- In office January 8, 2011 – January 5, 2019
- Governor: Dennis Daugaard
- Preceded by: Dennis Daugaard
- Succeeded by: Larry Rhoden

58th Chair of the National Lieutenant Governors Association
- In office 2017–2018
- Preceded by: Dan McKee
- Succeeded by: Mike Cooney

Speaker of the South Dakota House of Representatives
- In office January 2003 – January 2007
- Preceded by: Scott G. Eccarius
- Succeeded by: Thomas Deadrick

Member of the South Dakota House of Representatives from the 18th district
- In office January 1999 – January 2007
- Succeeded by: Nick Moser

Personal details
- Born: March 9, 1960 (age 66) Pierre, South Dakota, U.S.
- Party: Republican
- Spouse: Karen Lindbloom
- Children: 1 son
- Education: University of South Dakota (BS, JD)

Military service
- Allegiance: United States
- Branch/service: United States Navy
- Years of service: 1985–1989
- Unit: Navy Judge Advocate General's Corps

Matthew Michels (born March 9, 1960) is an American politician who served as the 38th lieutenant governor of South Dakota from 2011 to 2019.

== Early life and education ==
Michels was born in Pierre, South Dakota. He graduated with a B.S. from the University of South Dakota in 1981 and a J.D. from the University of South Dakota School of Law in 1985. Michels also worked as a nurse between 1981 and 1985.

== Career ==
Michels attended Naval Justice School and entered U.S. Navy JAG Corps. He was honorably discharged from the JAG Corps in 1989. He later became general counsel for Avera Health.

A member of the Republican Party, he served as speaker of the South Dakota House of Representatives from 2003 to 2007. Dennis Daugaard picked him as his running mate in the 2010 gubernatorial election; they were reelected in 2014.

== Electoral history ==
South Dakota House of Representatives District 18 Election, 2002
Party	Candidate	Votes	%
Republican	Matt Michels	5,724	35.31
Republican	Jean Hunhoff	4,699	28.98
Democratic	Scott Swier	4,234	26.11
Democratic	Jay Blankenfield	1,556	9.60

South Dakota House of Representatives District 18 Election, 2004
Party	Candidate	Votes	%
Republican	Matt Michels	6,866	53.39
Republican	Jean Hunhoff	5,993	46.61

Political offices
Preceded by Scott Eccarius	Speaker of the South Dakota House of Representatives; 2003–2007	Succeeded by Thomas Deadrick
Preceded by Dennis Daugaard	Lieutenant Governor of South Dakota; 2011–2019	Succeeded by Larry Rhoden
Party political offices
Preceded by Dennis Daugaard	Republican nominee for Lieutenant Governor of South Dakota; 2010, 2014	Succeeded by Larry Rhoden
