= James D. Jelbert =

American politician (1917–2006)

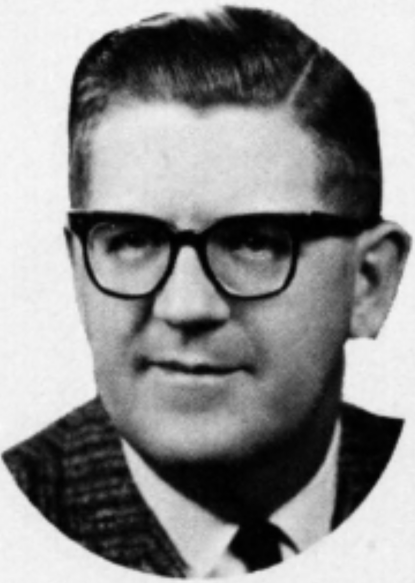
- Jelbert in 1971

Member of the South Dakota House of Representatives
- In office 1957–1974

Speaker of the South Dakota House of Representatives
- In office 1967–1968
- Preceded by: Charles C. Droz
- Succeeded by: Dexter H. Gunderson

Personal details
- Born: April 6, 1917
- Died: November 1, 2006 (aged 89)
- Party: Republican

James D. Jelbert (April 6, 1917 – November 1, 2006) was an American politician. He served as a Republican member of the South Dakota House of Representatives.
