= List of speakers of the South Dakota House of Representatives =

This is a comprehensive list of speakers of the South Dakota House of Representatives since statehood in 1889.

- For information about the House of Representatives, see South Dakota House of Representatives

Five South Dakota speakers have gone on to serve as governor.

#	Speaker	Party	City	County	Term	Other office	Term
1	Sutton E. Young	Republican	Sioux Falls	Minnehaha	1889–1890		
2	Charles X. Seward	Republican	Watertown	Codington	1891–1892		
3	James Marshall Lawson	Republican	Aberdeen	Brown	1893–1894	State Senator; SD President Pro Tempore	1899–1906; 1901–1902
4	Charles Tisdale Howard	Republican	Redfield	Spink	1895–1896		
5	John Colvin	Populist	Mitchell	Davison	1897–1898		
6	Albert G. Somers	Republican	Strouseton	Grant	1899–1902		
7	John L. Browne	Republican	Aberdeen	Brown	1903–1906		
8	Morris J. Chaney	Republican	Wakonda	Clay	1907–1910		
9	Charles J. Morris	Republican	Sioux Falls	Minnehaha	1911–1912		
10	Peter J. Tscharner	Republican	Lemmon	Perkins	1913–1914		
11	Charles A. Christopherson	Republican	Sioux Falls	Minnehaha	1915–1916	U.S. Congressman	1919–1933
12	A.C. Roberts	Republican	Pierpont	Day	1917–1918		
13	Lewis Benson	Republican	Flandreau	Moody	1919–1920		
14	Christian O. Berdahl	Republican	Garretson	Minnehaha	1921–1922		
15	Emmet Orville Frescoln	Republican	Winner	Tripp	1923–1924		
16	Charles S. McDonald	Republican	Sioux Falls	Minnehaha	1925–1926		
17	Ray F. Williamson	Republican	Aberdeen	Brown	1927–1928		
18	Daniel K. Loucks	Republican	Watertown	Codington	1929–1930		
19	B.W. McVeigh	Republican	Britton	Marshall	1931–1932		
20	George Abild	Democratic	Pukwana	Brule	1933–1934		
21	W. J. Eggert	Democratic	Rockham	Faulk	1935–1936		
22	Albert C. Miller	Republican	Kennebec	Lyman	1937–1940	Lieutenant Governor; South Dakota Attorney General	1941–1945; 1961-1963
23	George T. Mickelson	Republican	Selby	Walworth	1941–1942	South Dakota Attorney General; Governor	1943–1947; 1947–1951
24	O.H. Hove	Republican	Colman	Moody	1943–1944		
25	Anton Christian Halls	Republican	Garretson	Minnehaha	1945–1946		
26	George Wininger Mills	Republican	Wall	Pennington	1947–1948		
27	Arthur E. Munck	Republican	Pierre	Hughes	1949–1950		
28	Hugh H. Stokes	Republican	Flandreau	Moody	1951–1952		
29	Hobart H. Gates	Republican	Custer	Custer	1953–1954		
30	Nils A. Boe	Republican	Sioux Falls	Minnehaha	1955–1958	Lieutenant Governor; Governor	1963–1965; 1965–1969
31	Archie M. Gubbrud	Republican	Alcester	Lincoln	1959–1960	Governor	1961–1965
32	Carl T. Burgess	Republican	Rapid City	Pennington	1961–1962		
33	Paul E. Brown	Republican	Arlington	Kingsbury	1963–1964		
34	Charles C. Droz	Republican	Miller	Hand	1965–1966		
35	James D. Jelbert	Republican	Spearfish	Lawrence	1967–1968		
36	Dexter H. Gunderson	Republican	Irene	Clay	1969–1970		
37	Donald E. Osheim	Republican	Watertown	Codington	1971–1972		
38	Gene N. Lebrun	Democratic	Rapid City	Pennington	1973–1974		
39	Joseph H. Barnett	Republican	Aberdeen	Brown	1975–1976		
40	Lowell C. Hansen II	Republican	Sioux Falls	Minnehaha	1977–1978	Lieutenant Governor	1979–1986
41	George S. Mickelson	Republican	Brookings	Brookings	1979–1980	Governor	1987–1993
42	Walter Dale Miller	Republican	New Underwood	Pennington	1981–1982	Lieutenant Governor; Governor	1987–1993; 1993–1994
43	Jerome B. Lammers	Republican	Madison	Lake	1983–1984		
44	Donald J. Ham	Republican	Rapid City	Pennington	1985–1986		
45	Debra R. Anderson	Republican	Sioux Falls	Minnehaha	1987–1988		
46	Royal J. 'Bud' Wood	Republican	Warner	Brown	1989–1990		
47	E. James 'Jim' Hood	Republican	Spearfish	Lawrence	1991–1992		
48	Steve K. Cutler	Republican	Claremont	Brown	1993–1994		
49	Harvey C. Krautschun	Republican	Spearfish	Lawrence	1995–1996		
50	Rexford A. 'Rex' Hagg	Republican	Rapid City	Pennington	1997–1998		
51	Roger W. Hunt	Republican	Brandon	Minnehaha	1999–2000		
52	Scott G. Eccarius	Republican	Rapid City	Pennington	2001–2002		
53	Matthew J. W. Michels	Republican	Yankton	Yankton	2003–2006	Lieutenant Governor	2011–2019
54	Thomas J. Deadrick	Republican	Platte	Charles Mix	2007–2010		
55	Valentine Rausch	Republican	Big Stone City	Grant	2011–2012		
56	Brian Gosch	Republican	Rapid City	Pennington	2013–2014		
57	Dean Wink	Republican	Howes	Meade	2015–2016		
58	Mark Mickelson	Republican	Sioux Falls	Minnehaha	2017–2018		
59	Steven Haugaard	Republican	Sioux Falls	Minnehaha	2019–2020		
60	Spencer Gosch	Republican	Glenham	Walworth	2021–2022		
61	Hugh Bartels	Republican	Watertown	Codington	2023–2025		
62	Jon Hansen	Republican	Dell Rapids	Minnehaha	2025–present		

== See also ==
- List of South Dakota state legislatures
