= Sherrie Rollins Westin =

American television executive

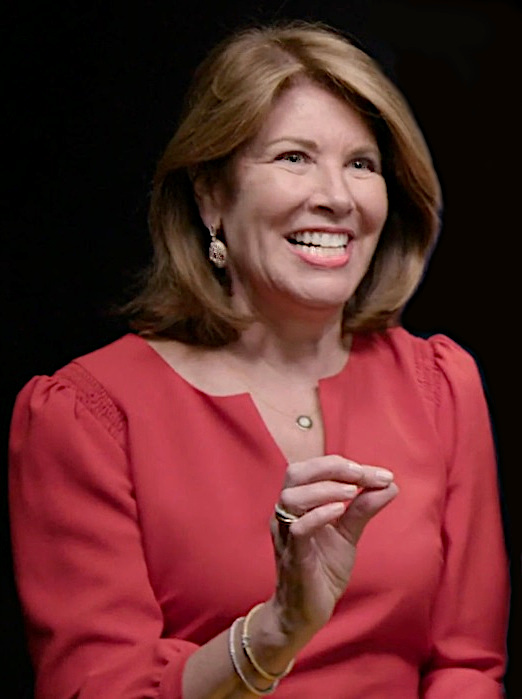
- Sherrie Westin in 2019

Director of the White House Office of Intergovernmental Affairs
- In office January 24, 1992 – January 20, 1993
- President: George H. W. Bush
- Preceded by: Debra R. Anderson
- Succeeded by: Regina Montoya

Personal details
- Born: Sherrie Lynn Sandy; 1958 (age 67–68) Roanoke, Virginia, U.S.
- Party: Republican
- Spouse(s): Ed Rollins (divorced) David Westin
- Children: 2
- Relatives: Mark Sandy (brother)
- Education: University of Virginia (BA)

Sherrie Rollins Westin is an American businesswoman. She is the CEO of Sesame Workshop, the nonprofit educational organization that produces the television series Sesame Street.

== Early life and education ==
She was born Sherrie Lynn Sandy to Charlotte Ann (née Weeks) and William Gresham Sandy of Roanoke, Virginia. She has two siblings, William G. Sandy Jr. and Mark Steven Sandy. In 1980, she graduated with a degree in Communications from the University of Virginia, and in 1986 was the director of communications for the Oliver Carr Company, a real-estate development concern in Washington.

== Career ==
After graduating, she worked at a public relations marketing firm in Georgetown; and then went to her firm's primary client, the Georgetown Business and Professional Association. She then worked for the Ronald Reagan 1984 presidential campaign, and then as head of communications for the Oliver Carr Company a Washington real estate development firm. In 1992, she was appointed as the first assistant secretary for public affairs at the U.S. Department of Housing and Urban Development (HUD) then headed by New York Republican U.S. Representative Jack Kemp. The chairman of ABC News, Roone Arledge, recruited her to become the head of communications of the division. She left ABC News to serve as Assistant to the President for Public Liaison and Intergovernmental Affairs under President George H. W. Bush. After his term was over, she was Vice President of Communications for U.S. News and World Report Magazine before returning to ABC as executive vice president of network communications.

Westin is chair of the Joan Ganz Cooney Center, an independent research and innovation lab named for Sesame Street’s founder. She serves on the boards of the U.S. Global Leadership Coalition, Communities in Schools, and Vital Voices Global Partnership. She is a member of the Council on Foreign Relations, the US-Afghan Women's Council, the Early Childhood Peace Consortium Advisory Board, and serves on the Early Childhood Development Action Network Education Leadership Council.

== Awards and recognition ==
In 2014, Westin was awarded an honorary doctorate from Concordia College in New York.

In 2017, Westin was named one of Fast Company's "100 Most Creative People in Business". She was also awarded the Smithsonian's "American Ingenuity Award".

== Personal life ==
Westin has been married twice. In 1987, she married Ed Rollins. Westin lives in Bronxville, New York, with her second husband, David Westin; she has two children.

Political offices
Preceded by Debra R. Anderson	Director of the White House Office of Intergovernmental Affairs; 1992–1993	Succeeded by Regina Montoya
