= James Marshall Lawson =

American politician

James Marshall Lawson was a lawyer and state legislator in South Dakota. He served in the South Dakota House of Representatives, including as speaker of the house, and in the South Dakota Senate.

He helped establish Northern Normal and Industrial School.

== See also ==
- List of speakers of the South Dakota House of Representatives
