= Dorcas Hardy =

American government official (1946–2019)

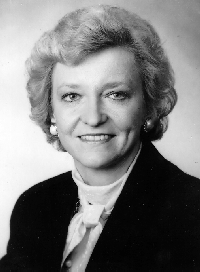

10th Commissioner of the Social Security Administration
- In office June 26, 1986 – July 31, 1989
- President: Ronald Reagan; George H. W. Bush
- Preceded by: Martha McSteen (acting)
- Succeeded by: Gwendolyn King

Personal details
- Born: Dorcas Ruth Hardy; July 18, 1946 Newark, New Jersey, U.S.
- Died: November 28, 2019 (aged 73) Spotsylvania County, Virginia, U.S.
- Resting place: Quantico National Cemetery
- Party: Republican
- Spouse: Samuel Spagnolo (m. 1996)
- Education: Connecticut College (BA); Pepperdine University (MBA)

Dorcas Ruth Hardy Spagnolo (July 18, 1946 – November 28, 2019) was an American healthcare specialist. She was the 10th Commissioner of the Social Security Administration (SSA) from 1986 to 1989. She was the first woman SSA Commissioner. Hardy held conservative views and remained active in politics after her tenure.

Prior to her appointment as SSA Commissioner, Hardy was associate director of the Center for Health Services Research at the University of Southern California School of Medicine and was assistant secretary for health in California under then-governor Ronald Reagan.

== Early life and education ==
Hardy was born in Newark, New Jersey, on July 18, 1946. She was the daughter of C. Colburn Hardy, a New Jersey assemblyman, and Ruth E. Hardy. As a child, she worked to stuff envelopes at a Republican campaign center as part of an early interest in politics. She attended Miss Beard's School (now Morristown-Beard School) in Orange, New Jersey; Hardy initially enrolled for First grade, though later returned for secondary school, graduating in 1964.

Hardy received her undergraduate education at Connecticut College, obtaining her bachelor's degree in 1968 as a major in government with Phi Beta Kappa membership. She spent a year in college abroad in Pakistan for the World Association of Girl Guides and Girl Scouts and also spent time in Tanzania. In an interview for The Christian Science Monitor, her father recalled, "in college, Dorcas ran for office twice and lost both times. Then she became a campaign manager, and never lost. And she managed her dormitory, a 28-hour-per-day-job, and did it very well." Hardy had been a student housefellow during the 1967–68 academic year, and was a classmate of future U.S. commissioner on aging Carol Fraser Fisk, for whom she later administered the oath of office.

After graduating, Hardy earned a Master of Business Administration (MBA) degree from Pepperdine University in 1976. While in graduate school, she joined the Junior League of Pasadena, California, and had been a staff member of the California Delegation to the Republican National Convention. In December 1978, she completed the Executive Program in Health Policy and Financial Management at Harvard University.

== Career ==
Hardy began her early career as a legislative research assistant to New Jersey Senator Clifford Case in 1970. Afterwards, she became a special assistant on the White House Conference on Children and Youth, and served as the executive director of the Health Services Industry Committee in Washington, D.C., from November 1971 until January 1973.

Hardy returned to California to assume the position of Assistant Secretary for Health under California governor Ronald Reagan and Associate Director of the Center for Health Services Research at the University of Southern California School of Medicine from 1974 to 1981.

In 1981, Hardy moved to Washington, D.C., as Assistant Secretary for Human Development Services at the U.S. Department of Health and Human Services and as chair of the Task Force on Legal Equity for Women under Reagan.

=== SSA and government service ===
President Ronald Reagan nominated Hardy as SSA Commissioner on March 19, 1986. She began in the position later that year after Senate confirmation hearings in May. Hardy then was SSA Commissioner through the beginning of the George H. W. Bush Presidential Administration. During the Reagan Administration, Hardy also was Assistant Secretary for Human Development Services at the U.S. Department of Health and Human Services (1981-1986). She was Assistant Secretary for Health of the California Health and Welfare Agency (1973-1974) during Reagan's governorship.

Hardy chaired the U.S. Department of Veterans Affairs' Task Force on Vocational Rehabilitation and Employment in 2004 and the Policy Committee of the White House Conference on Aging in 2005. As of 2013, she served on the seven-member Social Security Advisory Board (SSAB). The SSAB advises the President, the U.S. Congress, and the Social Security Commissioner on policies for Social Security and Supplemental Security Income.

== Private sector activities ==
Hardy headed the Health Services Industry Committee of the Cost of Living Council as its executive director from 1971 to 1973. Between 1974 and 1981, she was the Associate Director of the Center for Health Services Research at the University of Southern California. Hardy has also been chairman and CEO of Work Recovery Inc., a rehabilitation technology firm in Tucson, Arizona. In 2011, she received appointment to the Board of Visitors of the University of Mary Washington in Fredericksburg, Virginia. Hardy has also been on the Board of Directors of First Coast Service Options Inc., a Medicare contractor, Wright Investors Service Managed Fund, and Options Clearing Corporation.

Hardy previously hosted Financing Your Future, a weekly television program that aired in primetime on Financial News Network and UPI Broadcasting. She also hosted The Senior American, a political magazine TV show that aired on NET.

== Honors and awards ==
The National Coalition of Hispanic Mental Health and Human Services awarded Hardy their National Humanitarian Award. National Hispanic University in East San Jose, California, awarded her their Thomas Rivera Award. In 1989, Connecticut College, Hardy's alma mater, awarded her its College Medal.

== Personal life and death ==
Hardy married Samuel V. Spagnolo in 1996. She died on November 28, 2019, in her residence at Spotsylvania County, Virginia, at age 73. A memorial service was held at Washington National Cathedral on January 16, 2020.

Political offices
Preceded by Martha McSteen; Acting	Commissioner of the Social Security Administration; 1986–1989	Succeeded by Gwendolyn King
