= Frank Donatelli =

American political consultant

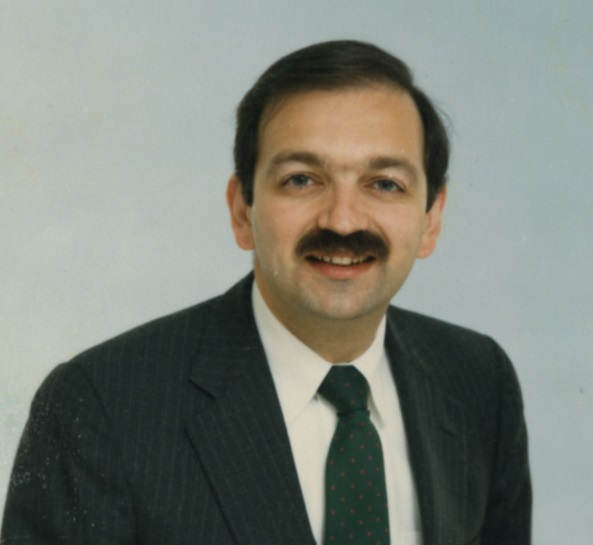

White House Director of Political and Intergovernmental Affairs
- In office March 1, 1987 – January 20, 1989
- President: Ronald Reagan
- Preceded by: Mitch Daniels
- Succeeded by: James Wray (Political Affairs); Debra R. Anderson (Intergovernmental Affairs)

Personal details
- Born: July 4, 1949 (age 76); Pittsburgh, Pennsylvania, U.S.
- Political party: Republican
- Education: University of Pittsburgh (BA); American University (JD)

Frank J. Donatelli (born July 4, 1949) is a Republican Party political consultant and lawyer.

== Biography ==
Frank was born on July 4, 1949, in Pennsylvania to Herman and Philomena Donatelli (Paladino). Frank is married to Rebecca Black Donatelli since 1978 and they have one daughter. He is a graduate of the University of Pittsburgh and American University Law School, Donatelli served in various positions in the Reagan administration including Assistant to the President for Political and Intergovernmental Affairs and Deputy Assistant to the President for Public Liaison. He worked on White House Chief of Staff James Baker's team that negotiated the 1984 presidential debates and served as a Regional Political Director for Ronald Reagan. He was also active in the presidential campaigns of George H. W. Bush in 1988 and 1992 and was a senior advisor to Bob Dole during the 1996 presidential election.

In 1992, Donatelli served as chairman of the Christopher Columbus Quincentennial Commission which celebrated the 500th anniversary of Christopher Columbus' arrival in the New World. He is Executive Vice President and Director of Federal Public Affairs of McGuireWoods Consulting as well as counsel to McGuireWoods. He also serves as secretary and treasurer of the board of the Young America's Foundation, is chairman of the Reagan Ranch Board of Governors and was selected by John McCain to serve as the deputy chairman of the Republican National Committee under Mike Duncan during the 2008 presidential election. Afterwards, in March 2009, he was chosen to become chairman of GOPAC, succeeding Michael Steele who became chairman of the RNC.

Political offices
Preceded by Mitch Daniels	White House Director of Political and Intergovernmental Affairs; 1987–1989; Served alongside: Haley Barbour, Frank Lavin (Political Affairs); Gwendolyn King, Andy Card, Karen Spencer (Intergovernmental Affairs)	Succeeded by James Wray as White House Director of Political Affairs
Preceded by Mitch Daniels	White House Director of Political and Intergovernmental Affairs; 1987–1989; Served alongside: Haley Barbour, Frank Lavin (Political Affairs); Gwendolyn King, Andy Card, Karen Spencer (Intergovernmental Affairs)	Succeeded by Debra R. Anderson as White House Director of Intergovernmental Affairs
