= Kate S. O'Scannlain =

American attorney and government official

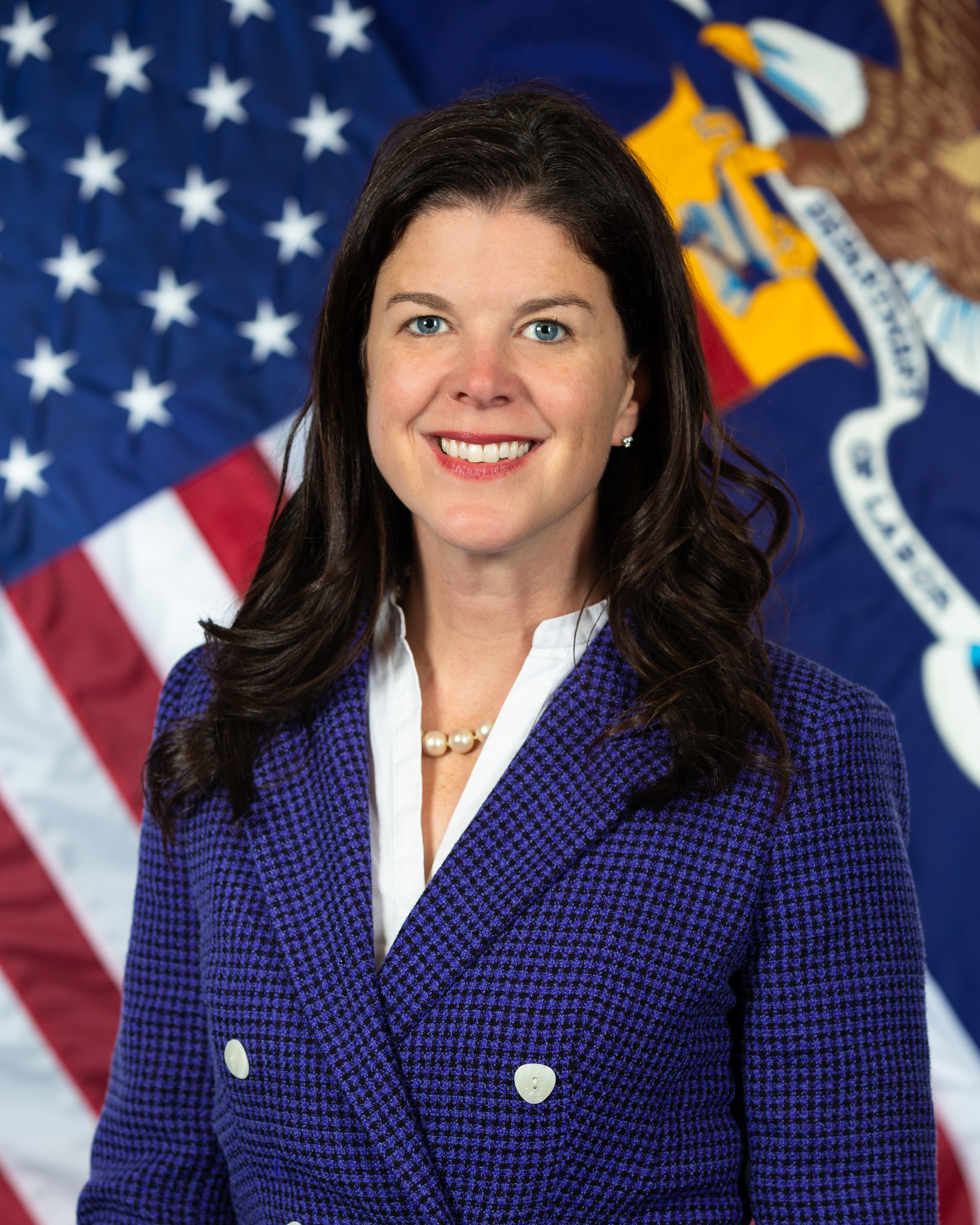

United States Solicitor of Labor
- In office December 21, 2017 – January 20, 2021
- President: Donald Trump
- Secretary: Alexander Acosta; Eugene Scalia
- Preceded by: M. Patricia Smith
- Succeeded by: Seema Nanda

Personal details
- Born: February 5, 1977 (age 48) Portland, Oregon, U.S.
- Relations: Diarmuid O'Scannlain (father)
- Education: University of Notre Dame (BA, JD)

Kate S. O'Scannlain is an American attorney who served as the United States Solicitor of Labor in the Donald Trump Administration from 2017 to 2021. She was nominated on September 28, 2017, and officially confirmed by the United States Senate on December 21, 2017.

== Early life and education ==
A native of Portland, Oregon, O'Scannlain earned her Bachelor of Arts from the University of Notre Dame, graduating cum laude, and her Juris Doctor from Notre Dame Law School. O'Scannlain's father is Diarmuid O'Scannlain, a Judge who served on the United States Court of Appeals for the Ninth Circuit in Portland before entering senior status in 2016.

== Career ==
Prior to joining the United States Department of Labor, O'Scannlain was a partner at Kirkland & Ellis, where she worked for 12 years in their Washington, D.C. office and specialized in commercial class-action litigation, contract disputes, insurance disputes, fraud and fiduciary duty claims, defamation claims, securities fraud, bankruptcy, and pension and retirement law. She has served as a regular volunteer with the Catholic Charities Legal Network Clinic. O'Scannlain is also a member of the conservative Federalist Society legal organization.
