= Seema Nanda (government official) =

American government official

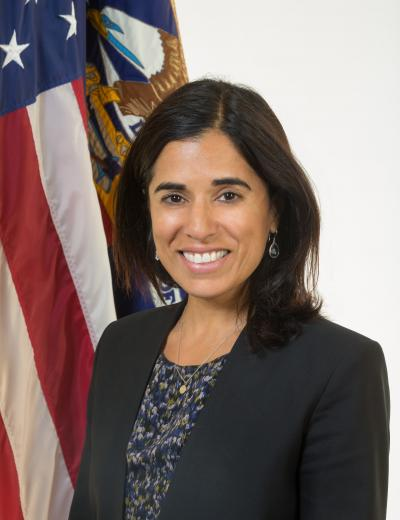

United States Solicitor of Labor
- In office July 14, 2021 – January 20, 2025
- President: Joe Biden
- Secretary: Marty Walsh; Julie Su (acting)
- Preceded by: Kate S. O'Scannlain
- Succeeded by: Jonathan Berry

United States Deputy Solicitor of Labor
- In office March 2016 – July 2016
- President: Barack Obama
- Secretary: Tom Perez
- Solicitor: M. Patricia Smith

Personal details
- Born: Chicago, Illinois
- Education: Brown University; Boston College

Seema Nanda is an American government official who served as the United States solicitor of labor in the Biden administration.

== Early life and education ==
Seema Nanda was born in Chicago after her parents immigrated to the United States in 1970. Her parents are from Punjab but were refugees during partition and grew up in Uttar Pradesh; both came to the US and worked as dentists. Nanda grew up in West Simsbury, Connecticut and attended the Westminster School.

Nanda received an A.B. from Brown University in 1992 and a J.D. from Boston College Law School in 1995.

== Career ==
Nanda worked as an associate at Davis Wright Tremaine in Seattle until 2000, when she joined the National Labor Relations Board. From 2007 to 2010, Nanda worked as a supervisor attorney at the National Labor Relations Board. She served as a senior trial attorney from 2010 to 2011 and acting deputy special counsel from 2011 to 2013 at the United States Department of Justice Civil Rights Division. She served as a fellow at Harvard Law School's Labor and Worklife Program from 2020-2021.

Nanda joined the Department of Labor in 2013, serving as chief of staff and deputy chief of staff to Secretary of Labor Tom Perez.

In July 2018, Nanda became CEO of the Democratic National Committee. She served in the position until May 2020.

=== Solicitor of Labor nomination ===
Nanda was nominated to become the United States solicitor of labor by President Joe Biden on March 26, 2021. The Senate HELP Committee held hearings on her nomination on April 29, 2021. The committee favorably reported her nomination to the Senate floor on May 12, 2021. The entire Senate confirmed Nanda on July 14, 2021, by a vote of 53-46.

==== Tenure ====
On November 6, 2021, it was reported that Nanda defended President Biden's attempt to enforce a COVID-19 vaccine mandate against US workers at businesses with over 100 employees after a federal judge blocked it on the grounds that the plaintiffs' challenge against the mandate raised “grave statutory and constitutional issues.” Nanda asserted that the Department of Labor was “confident in its legal authority” to issue the rule; that Federal law “explicitly gives OSHA the authority to act quickly in an emergency where the agency finds that workers are subjected to a grave danger and a new standard is necessary to protect them"; and that [the US Department of Labor is] "fully prepared to defend this standard in court.”
