= Senator Galvin =

Senator Galvin may refer to:

- Michael J. Galvin (1907–1963), Massachusetts State Senate
- Owen A. Galvin (1852–1897), Massachusetts State Senate
