= Steven Law =

Steven Law may refer to:

- Htun Myint Naing or Steven Law, Burmese businessman and son of Lo Hsing Han
- Steven J. Law, American attorney and Republican Party fundraiser
- Stephen Law (born 1960), philosopher and lecturer
