= James T. O'Connell =

American government official (1906–1966)

12th United States Deputy Secretary of Labor
- In office 1957–1961
- President: Dwight D. Eisenhower
- Preceded by: Arthur Larson
- Succeeded by: W. Willard Wirtz

Personal details
- Born: 1906 New York City, New York U.S.
- Died: October 12, 1966 (aged 59–60) New York City, New York U.S.
- Education: Columbia University (BA, BS)

James T. O'Connell (1906–1966), also known as Jock O'Connell, was an American businessman and government official. He served as the United States Deputy Secretary of Labor from 1957 to 1962 in the Eisenhower administration. Later he became vice president of the Hudson Pulp & Paper Corporation.

== Biography ==
A native New Yorker, O'Connell received his B.A. from Columbia University in 1928, B.S. in 1929, and a civil engineering degree in 1930. At Columbia, he was classmates with future Undersecretary of Labor James J. Reynolds.

After graduation, he was employed by various private engineering firms as well as federal and municipal agencies in construction projects around the city. In September 1940, he entered the United States Army with the rank of captain. He served in labor relations and civilian personnel work in the United States and Germany. In 1945, he was awarded a Legion of Merit and was discharged with the rank of colonel a year later.

After the war, O'Connell served briefly in the National Housing Agency and joined the Publix Shirt Corporation, where he served as the vice president of industrial relations for ten years. During his employment, he negotiated twelve agreements, primarily with the Amalgamated Clothing Workers of America and the International Brotherhood of Teamsters and the company maintained healthy relations with its employees. From 1954, he also served as an advisor to United States Secretary of Labor James P. Mitchell in the field of manpower and industrial relations as well as a consultant to the United States Department of the Army on civilian personnel management.

On January 3, 1957, he was named Undersecretary of Labor by Secretary James P. Mitchell. His responsibilities included general management, development and coordination of departmental programs, and the handling of Congressional and public relations.

After retiring from government service, he joined Hudson Pulp & Paper Corporation as director of industrial relations and later was named vice president of administration.

== Personal life ==
O' Connell was married to Adele Quilgan and they had five children. He died on October 12, 1966, at a New York City Hospital for a heart ailment.
