= Krauskopf =

Krauskopf is a surname, derived from the German nickname for one with curly hair (krus: "curly" or "crinkled" + kopf: "head") Notable people with the name include:

- Engelbert Krauskopf (1820–1881), German-American gunsmith and naturalist
- Joan Krauskopf (born 1932), American law professor
- Joseph Krauskopf (1858–1923), American rabbi and author
- Kelly Krauskopf, American basketball executive
- Konrad Bates Krauskopf (1910–2003), American geologist
- Nord Krauskopf (1922–1986), American businessman and NASCAR owner
