= Howard M. Radzely =

American lawyer

Howard Radzely
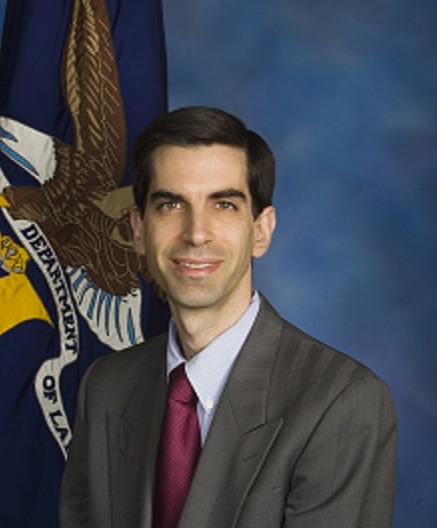
- Official portrait, 2007

United States Secretary of Labor
- Acting
- In office January 20, 2009 – February 2, 2009
- President: Barack Obama
- Preceded by: Elaine Chao
- Succeeded by: Edward C. Hugler (acting)

United States Deputy Secretary of Labor
- In office December 19, 2007 – February 2, 2009
- President: George W. Bush; Barack Obama
- Preceded by: Steven J. Law
- Succeeded by: Seth Harris

United States Solicitor of Labor
- In office January 2003 – December 2007
- President: George W. Bush
- Preceded by: Eugene Scalia
- Succeeded by: Gregory F. Jacob

Personal details
- Born: 1970 (age 55–56)
- Education: University of Pennsylvania (BS); Harvard University (JD)

Howard Minion Radzely (born 1970) is an American lawyer who served as the United States Deputy Secretary of Labor from December 19, 2007 through February 2, 2009 and acting United States Secretary of Labor from January 20, 2009 through February 2, 2009.

== Education and early career ==
Radzely graduated summa cum laude from the University of Pennsylvania's Wharton School of Business and magna cum laude from the Harvard Law School, where he served on the Harvard Law Review. After graduating from law school, Radzely clerked for J. Michael Luttig, United States Court of Appeals for the Fourth Circuit, and for Antonin Scalia, Supreme Court of the United States. Radzely was subsequently an attorney in private practice in Washington, D.C., concentrating in labor and employment law.

== Department of Labor ==
Mr. Radzely first joined the Department of Labor on June 4, 2001, as the Deputy Solicitor of Labor. He served as both the Deputy Solicitor and Acting Solicitor of Labor from June 2001 until January 2002. He also served as Acting Solicitor from January 2003 until his confirmation as Solicitor on December 9, 2003, where he served for over three years.

President George W. Bush designated Mr. Radzely the Acting Deputy Secretary of Labor effective January 24, 2007, and nominated him for the permanent position on May 10, 2007. Mr. Radzely was confirmed by the U.S. Senate as Deputy Secretary on December 19, 2007. During this same period, Radzely also served on the board of directors for the Overseas Private Investment Corporation, a government agency that aids U.S. businesses in overseas investment and economic development, and he was a designated member of the Congressional-Executive Commission on China, which monitors China’s human rights record and legal development.

Radzely served as the Acting Secretary of Labor from January 20, 2009, until February 2, 2009. As of the latter date, President Barack Obama appointed Department of Labor Deputy Assistant Secretary Edward C. Hugler to act as Secretary.

== Later career ==
On July 1, 2009, Radzely joined the global law firm Morgan, Lewis & Bockius as a partner in its labor and employment law practice. He currently works as a Senior Vice President and Assistant General Counsel at The Boeing Company.

== See also ==
- List of law clerks for the ninth seat of the Supreme Court of the United States

Legal offices
Preceded by Eugene Scalia	United States Solicitor of Labor; 2003–2007	Succeeded by Gregory F. Jacob
Political offices
Preceded by Steven J. Law	United States Deputy Secretary of Labor; 2007–2009	Succeeded by Seth Harris
Preceded by Elaine Chao	United States Secretary of Labor; Acting; 2009	Succeeded by Edward C. Hugler; Acting
