= United States Solicitor of Labor =

Chief legal officer of the United States Department of Labor

- Seal of the Department of Labor

- Incumbent; Jonathan Berry since November 5, 2025
- United States Department of Labor
- Seat: Frances Perkins Building, Washington, D.C.
- Appointer: The president; with Senate advice and consent
- Formation: 1913
- Deputy: Steven Hough, Deputy Solicitor of Labor
- Salary: Executive Schedule, level IV
- Website: www.dol.gov/sol/

The United States solicitor of labor is the chief legal officer of the United States Department of Labor and the third-ranking officer of the department, behind the secretary of labor and deputy secretary of labor. The Office of the Solicitor has the second largest litigation department in the U.S. federal government, with about 500 lawyers in both national and regional offices. The Solicitor of Labor has independent authority to initiate lawsuits to enforce 180 federal workplace statutes. The position is a Presidential appointee requiring Senate confirmation, and is paid at Level IV of the Executive Schedule.

The Office of the Solicitor was established by the Organic Act of 1913, which separated the Department of Labor from the Department of Commerce and Labor, although a solicitor position for the combined department had existed since 1903. The solicitor of labor was originally located in the Department of Justice until it was transferred to the Department of Labor in 1933. In 1940, all Department attorneys and legal personnel were transferred to the supervision of the solicitor of labor. In the 1980s, the office attracted attention for delays in cases enforcing the Employee Retirement Income Security Act of 1974, and for not seeking the maximum compensation for back wages due under the Fair Labor Standards Act of 1938. In 2019, a memo directing lawyers to consult with agency heads before filing lawsuits against employers was criticized as ceding some of its authority to political appointees.

== List ==
The following people have held the office of Solicitor of Labor:

Portrait	Solicitors	Took office	Left office
	John B. Bensmore	1913	1918
	John W. Abercrombie	1918	1921
	Theodore G. Risly	1921	1932
	Charles E. Wyzanski	1933	1935
	Charles O. Gregory	1936	1937
	Gerard D. Reilly	1937	1941
	Warner D. Gardner	1941	1942
	Irving J. Levy (Acting)	1942	1943
	Douglas B. Maggs	1943	1945
	William S. Tyson	1945	1953
	Harry N. Routzohn	1953	1953
	Stuart Rothman	1953	1959
	Irving Nystrom (Acting)	1959	1961
	Charles Donahue	1961	1969
	Laurence Silberman	1969	1970
	Peter Nash	1970	1971
	Richard F. Schubert	1971	1973
	William J. Kilberg	1973	1977
	Carin Clauss	1977	1981
	T. Timothy Ryan, Jr.	1981	1983
	Francis X. Lilly	1984	1985
	George R. Salem	1986	1989
	Robert P. Davis	1989	1991
	David S. Fortney (Acting)	1991	1992
	Marshall Breger	1992	1993
	Thomas S. Williamson, Jr.	1993	1996
	J. Davitt McAteer (Acting)	1996	1997
	Marvin Krislov (Acting)	1997	1998
	Henry L. Solano	1998	2001
	Judith E. Kramer (Acting)	2001	2001
	Howard M. Radzely (Acting)	2001	January 11, 2002
	Eugene Scalia	January 11, 2002	January 17, 2003
	Howard M. Radzely	January 2003	December 2007
	Gregory F. Jacob	December 2007	January 20, 2009
	M. Patricia Smith	March 1, 2010	January 19, 2017
	Nicholas C. Geale (Acting)	January 20, 2017	December 21, 2017
	Kate S. O'Scannlain	December 21, 2017	January 20, 2021
	Terri Johnson (Acting)	January 20, 2021	February 1, 2021
	Elena S. Goldstein (Acting)	February 1, 2021	July 14, 2021
	Seema Nanda	July 14, 2021	January 20, 2025
	Jonathan Snare (Acting)	February 24, 2025	November 5, 2025
	Jonathan Berry	November 5, 2025	Present
