= Executive Schedule =

Salary system of the U.S. federal government

The Executive Schedule (5 U.S.C. §§ 5311–5318) is the system of salaries given to the highest-ranked appointed officials in the executive branch of the U.S. government. The president of the United States appoints individuals to these positions, most with the advice and consent of the United States Senate. They include members of the president's Cabinet, several top-ranking officials of each executive department, the directors of some of the more prominent departmental and independent agencies, and several members of the Executive Office of the President.

There are five pay rates within the Executive Schedule, denoted with a Roman numeral with I being the highest level and V the lowest. Federal law lists the positions eligible for the Executive Schedule and the corresponding level. The law also gives the president the ability to grant Executive Schedule IV and V status to no more than 34 employees not listed.

Certain job titles tend to be placed at certain levels of the Executive Schedule. For example, in the executive departments, secretaries are on Level I; deputy secretaries are on Level II; under secretaries are mostly on Level III; and assistant secretaries, general counsels, inspectors general, chief financial officers, and chief information officers are mostly on Level IV. The directors of departmental and independent agencies vary widely in their placement, and are represented in every level from I to V, with their subordinates being placed on levels below them. A few agencies have general counsels, inspectors general, chief financial officers, or chief information officers on Level IV along with their departmental counterparts, although agency officials with these titles may instead be on another pay scale such as the Senior Executive Service.

== Calculation of pay rate ==
(Effective as of January 2026)
Level I	$253,100
Level II	$228,000
Level III	$209,600
Level IV	$197,200
Level V	$184,900

Many political appointees have had their pay rate frozen at lower levels. According to 5 U.S.C. § 5318, at the beginning of the first pay period for any position under the Executive Schedule, the amount of pay will be adjusted and rounded to the nearest multiple of US$100. If this amount is found to be midway between multiples of $100, then it will be rounded to the next highest multiple of $100.

Section 738 of division E of the Consolidated Appropriations Act, 2018 (Public Law 115-141, March 23, 2018), continued the freeze on the payable pay rates for certain senior political officials at 2013 levels through January 5, 2019. The failure to enact new appropriations legislation may allow the freeze to expire. However, the officially established and posted pay rates (or pay ranges) for 2018 are in effect and used for determining pay for other employees. For more information, please see Compensation Policy Memorandum 2018-08 at https://chcoc.gov/content/continued-pay-freeze-certain-senior-political-officials-2.

Executive Schedule rates indirectly affect the rates of pay for other pay scales such as the General Schedule, Senior Executive Service, Senior Level, Senior Foreign Service, and other federal civilian pay systems, as well as the pay of uniformed military personnel, because various federal laws establishing those pay systems normally tie the maximum amount payable to various levels of the Executive Schedule. For example, federal employees paid on the General Schedule may not earn more than the rate for Level IV of the Executive Schedule, after factoring in GS special rates and locality pay. Because of these pay caps and freezes to the Executive Schedule, federal workers at the top of their pay bands are often unable to receive pay increases, resulting in salary compression.

== Level I ==
5 U.S.C. § 5312 lists the positions that receive pay at Level I of the Executive Schedule. As of January 2025, the annual rate of pay for Level I positions is $250,600. 21 positions exist in this level, which are as follows:

=== Department staff ===
- Secretary of State
- Secretary of the Treasury
- Secretary of Defense
- Attorney General
- Secretary of the Interior
- Secretary of Homeland Security
- Secretary of Commerce
- Secretary of Housing and Urban Development
- Secretary of Energy
- Secretary of Education
- Secretary of Veterans Affairs
- Secretary of Health and Human Services
- Secretary of Agriculture
- Secretary of Labor
- Secretary of Transportation

=== Executive Office of the President ===
- United States Trade Representative, with the rank of Ambassador
- Director of the Office of Management and Budget
- Director of National Drug Control Policy, Office of National Drug Control Policy

=== Independent agencies ===
- Commissioner of Social Security, Social Security Administration
- Chair of the Federal Reserve
- Director of National Intelligence
- Former United States Presidents

== Level II ==
5 U.S.C. § 5313 lists the positions that receive pay at Level II of the Executive Schedule. As of January 2025, the annual rate of pay for Level II positions is $225,700.

=== Department deputy secretaries ===
- Deputy Secretary of Agriculture
- Deputy Secretary of Commerce
- Deputy Secretary of Defense
- Deputy Secretary of Education
- Deputy Secretary of Energy
- Deputy Secretary of Health and Human Services
- Deputy Secretary of Homeland Security
- Deputy Secretary of Housing and Urban Development
- Deputy Secretary of the Interior
- Deputy Attorney General
- Deputy Secretary of Labor
- Deputy Secretary of State
- Deputy Secretary of State for Management and Resources
- Deputy Secretary of Transportation
- Deputy Secretary of the Treasury
- Deputy Secretary of Veterans Affairs

=== Other department officials ===
Defense

- Secretary of the Army
- Secretary of the Navy
- Secretary of the Air Force

Homeland Security

- Director of the Cybersecurity and Infrastructure Security Agency
- Under Secretary of Homeland Security for Management
- Administrator of the Federal Emergency Management Agency
- Administrator of the Transportation Security Administration

Justice

- Director of the Federal Bureau of Investigation

Transportation

- Under Secretary of Transportation for Policy
- Administrator of the Federal Aviation Administration
- Administrator of the Federal Highway Administration
- Administrator of the Federal Transit Administration

=== Executive Office of the President ===
- Chair of the Council of Economic Advisers
- Director of the Office of Science and Technology Policy
- Deputy Director of the Office of National Drug Control Policy
- Deputy Director of the Office of Management and Budget
- Deputy Director for Management of the Office of Management and Budget and Federal Chief Performance Officer

=== Independent agencies ===
Intelligence Community

- Principal Deputy Director of National Intelligence
- Director of the National Counterterrorism Center
- Director of the Central Intelligence Agency

Other independent agencies

- Administrator of the National Aeronautics and Space Administration
- Administrator of the United States Agency for International Development
- Director of the United States Office of Personnel Management
- Administrator of the Environmental Protection Agency
- Director of the Federal Housing Finance Agency
- Deputy Commissioner of the Social Security Administration
- Chief Executive Officer of the Millennium Challenge Corporation
- Chair of the Nuclear Regulatory Commission
- Director of the National Science Foundation
- Director of the Bureau of Consumer Financial Protection
- Librarian of Congress
- Vice Chair of the Board of Governors of the Federal Reserve System
- Vice Chair for Supervision of the Board of Governors of the Federal Reserve System
- Members of the Board of Governors of the Federal Reserve System (4)

== Level III ==
5 U.S.C. § 5314 lists the 125 positions that receive pay at Level III of the Executive Schedule. As of January 2025, the annual rate of pay for Level III positions is $207,500.

=== Department under secretaries ===
- Under Secretaries of Agriculture (7)
- Under Secretaries of Commerce (7)
- Under Secretaries of Defense (5)
  - Under Secretary of the Air Force
  - Under Secretary of the Army
  - Under Secretary of the Navy
- Under Secretary of Education
- Under Secretaries of Energy (3)
- Under Secretaries of Homeland Security (2)
- Associate Attorney General
- Solicitor General
- Under Secretaries of State (6)
- Under Secretaries of the Treasury (3)
- Under Secretaries of Veterans Affairs (3)

=== Other department officials ===
Department of Energy

- Director of Advanced Research Projects Agency - Energy

Department of Health and Human Services

- Administrator, Centers for Medicare and Medicaid Services

Department of Homeland Security

- Director of United States Citizenship and Immigration Services
- Commissioner of United States Customs and Border Protection
- Deputy Administrator of the Federal Emergency Management Agency
- Deputy Administrator for Resilience of the Federal Emergency Management Agency

Department of Justice

- Administrator, Drug Enforcement Administration
- Director, Bureau of Alcohol, Tobacco, Firearms, and Explosives

Department of State

- United States Ambassador to the United Nations

Department of Transportation

- Administrator, National Highway Traffic Safety Administration
- Administrator, Federal Motor Carrier Safety Administration
- Administrator, Federal Railroad Administration
- Administrator, United States Maritime Administration
- Administrator, Pipeline and Hazardous Materials Safety Administration

Department of the Treasury

- Comptroller of the Currency
- Commissioner of Internal Revenue
- Director of the Office of Financial Research
- Independent Member with Insurance Expertise of the Financial Stability Oversight Council

Note: The Director of the Office of Thrift Supervision was level III before that office was abolished by the Dodd-Frank Act of 2010.

=== Executive Office of the President ===
- Three deputy trade representatives within the Office of the United States Trade Representative, currently:
  - Deputy United States Trade Representative for Europe, The Middle East, and Industrial Competitiveness, with the rank of Ambassador, in Washington, D.C.
  - Deputy United States Trade Representative for Investment, Services, Labor, Environment, Africa, China, and the Western Hemisphere, with the rank of Ambassador, in Washington, D.C.
  - Deputy United States Trade Representative and Permanent Representative of the United States of America to the World Trade Organization in Geneva, Switzerland
- Chief Agricultural Negotiator, with the rank of Ambassador, Office of the United States Trade Representative
- Chief Innovation and Intellectual Property Negotiator, with the rank of Ambassador, Office of the United States Trade Representative
- Administrator for Federal Procurement Policy
- Administrator, Office of Information and Regulatory Affairs, Office of Management and Budget
- Administrator of the Office of Electronic Government and Federal Chief Information Officer of the United States
- Controller of the Office of Federal Financial Management, Office of Management and Budget
- Deputy Director for Demand Reduction, Office of National Drug Control Policy
- Deputy Director for Supply Reduction, Office of National Drug Control Policy
- Deputy Director for State, Local, and Tribal Affairs, Office of National Drug Control Policy
- Executive Secretary, National Space Council

=== Independent agencies ===
Directors

- Administrator, General Services Administration
- Administrator, Small Business Administration
- Director, Peace Corps
- Chairman and president of the Export-Import Bank of the United States
- Director, Federal Mediation and Conciliation Service
- Chairman of the Board and Chief Executive Officer of the Farm Credit Administration
- Archivist of the United States
- Executive Director, Federal Retirement Thrift Investment Board
- Director of the United States Trade and Development Agency
- Director, Office of Government Ethics
- Register of Copyrights
- Director, Pension Benefit Guaranty Corporation
- Director of the Congressional Research Service

Deputy directors

- Deputy Director of the Central Intelligence Agency
- Deputy Administrator, National Aeronautics and Space Administration
- Deputy Administrator, United States Agency for International Development
- Deputy Director, National Science Foundation
- Deputy Director, Office of Personnel Management
- Deputy Administrator, Environmental Protection Agency
- Deputy Librarian of Congress

=== Boards and commissions ===
- Chairman, Merit Systems Protection Board
- Chairman, Federal Communications Commission
- Chairman, Board of Directors, Federal Deposit Insurance Corporation
- Chairman, Federal Energy Regulatory Commission
- Chairman, Federal Trade Commission
- Chairman, Surface Transportation Board
- Chairman, National Labor Relations Board
- Chairman, Securities and Exchange Commission
- Chairman, National Mediation Board
- Chairman, Railroad Retirement Board
- Chairman, Federal Maritime Commission
- Chairman, National Transportation Safety Board
- Chairman, National Endowment for the Arts
- Chairman, National Endowment for the Humanities
- Chairman, Postal Regulatory Commission
- Chairman, Occupational Safety and Health Review Commission
- Chairman, Equal Employment Opportunity Commission
- Chairman, Consumer Product Safety Commission
- Chairman, Commodity Futures Trading Commission
- Chairman, United States International Trade Commission
- Chairman, Federal Mine Safety and Health Review Commission
- Chairman, National Credit Union Administration Board
- Defense Nuclear Facilities Safety Board - (1) Chairman; (2) Vice Chairman; (3) Member; (4) Member; (5) Member
- Nuclear Regulatory Commission - Four Commissioners

=== Obsolete positions ===
- Director of the Office of Emergency Planning
- Chairman, Federal Housing Finance Board

== Level IV ==
5 U.S.C. § 5315 lists 346 non-obsolete positions that receive pay at Level IV of the Executive Schedule. As of January 2025, the annual rate of pay for Level IV positions is $195,200. Annual pay for General Schedule employees, including locality pay and special rates, may not exceed this level.

=== Department assistant secretaries ===
- Assistant Secretaries of Agriculture (3)
- Assistant Secretaries of Commerce (11)
- Assistant Secretaries of Defense (16)
  - Assistant Secretaries of the Air Force (5)
  - Assistant Secretaries of the Army (5)
  - Assistant Secretaries of the Navy (4)
- Assistant Secretaries of Education (10)
- Assistant Secretaries of Energy (6)
- Assistant Secretaries of Health and Human Services (6)
- Assistant Secretaries of the Department of Homeland Security
- Assistant Secretaries of Housing and Urban Development (8)
- Assistant Secretaries of the Interior (6)
- Assistant Attorneys General (10)
- Assistant Secretaries of Labor (10), one of whom shall be the Assistant Secretary of Labor for Veterans' Employment and Training
- Assistant Secretary of Labor for Mine Safety and Health
- Assistant Secretaries of State (24) and four other Department of State officials to be appointed by the president, by and with the advice and consent of the United States Senate
- Assistant Secretaries of Transportation (4)
- Assistant Secretaries of the Treasury (8)
- Deputy Under Secretaries of the Treasury (or Assistant Secretaries of the Treasury) (2)
- Assistant Secretaries of Veterans Affairs (7)

=== General counsels ===
- General Counsel of the Department of Agriculture
- General Counsel of the Department of Commerce
- General Counsel of the Department of Defense
- General Counsel of the Department of the Army
- General Counsel of the Department of the Navy
- General Counsel of the Department of the Air Force
- General Counsel of the Department of Education
- General Counsel of the Department of Energy
- General Counsel of the Department of Health and Human Services
- General Counsel of the Department of Homeland Security
- General Counsel of the Department of Housing and Urban Development
- Solicitor of the Department of the Interior
- Solicitor of Labor
- General Counsel of the Department of Transportation
- General Counsel of the Department of the Treasury
- General Counsel of the Department of Veterans Affairs
- General Counsel of the Central Intelligence Agency
- General Counsel of the Office of the Director of the National Intelligence
- General Counsel of the National Labor Relations Board
- Special Counsel of the Merit Systems Protection Board
- Chief Counsel for Advocacy, Small Business Administration

=== Inspectors general ===
- Inspector General of the Central Intelligence Agency
- Inspector General of the Department of Agriculture
- Inspector General of the Department of Commerce
- Inspector General of the Department of Defense
- Inspector General of the Department of Education
- Inspector General of the Department of Energy
- Inspector General of the Department of Health and Human Services
- Inspector General of the Department of Homeland Security
- Inspector General of the Department of Housing and Urban Development
- Inspector General of the Department of Justice
- Inspector General of the Department of Labor
- Inspector General of the Department of State
- Inspector General of the Department of the Interior
- Inspector General of the Department of the Treasury
- Inspector General of the Department of Transportation
- Inspector General of the Department of Veterans Affairs
- Inspector General of the Export-Import Bank
- Inspector General of the Federal Deposit Insurance Corporation
- Inspector General of the Federal Emergency Management Agency
- Inspector General of the General Services Administration
- Inspector General of the National Aeronautics and Space Administration
- Inspector General of the Nuclear Regulatory Commission
- Inspector General of the Office of Personnel Management
- Inspector General of the Railroad Retirement Board
- Inspector General of the Resolution Trust Corporation
- Inspector General of the Small Business Administration
- Inspector General of the Social Security Administration
- Inspector General of the Tennessee Valley Authority
- Inspector General of the United States Environmental Protection Agency
- Inspector General of the United States Postal Service

=== Chief financial officers ===
- Chief Financial Officer of the Department of Agriculture
- Chief Financial Officer of the Department of Commerce
- Chief Financial Officer of the Department of Education
- Chief Financial Officer of the Department of Energy
- Chief Financial Officer of the Department of Health and Human Services
- Chief Financial Officer of the Department of Homeland Security
- Chief Financial Officer of the Department of Housing and Urban Development
- Chief Financial Officer of the Department of the Interior
- Chief Financial Officer of the Department of Justice
- Chief Financial Officer of the Department of Labor
- Chief Financial Officer of the Department of State
- Chief Financial Officer of the Department of Transportation
- Chief Financial Officer of the Department of the Treasury
- Chief Financial Officer of the Department of Veterans Affairs
- Chief Financial Officer of the National Aeronautics and Space Administration
- Chief Financial Officer, United States Environmental Protection Agency

=== Chief information officers ===
- Chief Information Officer of the Department of Agriculture
- Chief Information Officer of the Department of Commerce
- Chief Information Officer, Department of Defense (unless the official designated is listed under section 5312, 5313, or 5314 of this title)
- Chief Information Officer of the Department of Education
- Chief Information Officer of the Department of Energy
- Chief Information Officer of the Department of Health and Human Services
- Chief Information Officer of the Department of Homeland Security
- Chief Information Officer, Federal Emergency Management Agency
- Chief Information Officer of the Department of Housing and Urban Development
- Chief Information Officer of the Department of the Interior
- Chief Information Officer of the Department of Justice
- Chief Information Officer of the Department of Labor
- Chief Information Officer of the Department of State
- Chief Information Officer of the Department of Transportation
- Chief Information Officer of the Department of the Treasury
- Chief Information Officer of the Department of Veterans Affairs
- Chief Information Officer of the National Aeronautics and Space Administration
- Chief Information Officer of the United States Agency for International Development
- Chief Information Officer, United States Environmental Protection Agency
- Chief Information Officer, General Services Administration
- Chief Information Officer, National Science Foundation
- Chief Information Officer, Nuclear Regulatory Agency
- Chief Information Officer, Office of Personnel Management
- Chief Information Officer, Small Business Administration

=== Other department officials ===
Department of Agriculture

- Administrator of the Rural Utilities Service

Department of Commerce

- Director of the Bureau of the Census
- Deputy Under Secretary of Commerce for Intellectual Property and Deputy Director of the United States Patent and Trademark Office

Department of Defense

- Director of Civil Defense, Department of the Army
- Director, Operational Test and Evaluation
- Director of Defense Research and Engineering
- Deputy Under Secretary of Defense for Policy
- Deputy Under Secretary of Defense for Personnel and Readiness

Department of Education

- Liaison for Community and Junior Colleges
- Director of the Office of Educational Technology
- Commissioner, National Center for Education Statistics

Department of Energy

- Administrator, Energy Information Administration
- Director, Office of Science
- Principal Deputy Administrator, National Nuclear Security Administration
- Additional deputy administrators of the National Nuclear Security Administration (3) (two if the Deputy Administrator for Naval Reactors is a United States Navy officer on active duty)

Department of Health and Human Services

- Commissioner of Food and Drugs

Department of Homeland Security

- Officer for Civil Rights and Civil Liberties
- Federal Insurance Administrator, Federal Emergency Management Agency

Department of Housing and Urban Development

- President, Government National Mortgage Association

Department of Justice

- Director, Community Relations Service
- Director, Bureau of Prisons
- Director of the National Institute of Justice
- Director of the Bureau of Justice Statistics
- Administrator, Office of Juvenile Justice and Delinquency Prevention
- Director of the United States Marshals Service
- Deputy Director of the Federal Bureau of Investigation

Department of Labor

- Administrator of the Wage & Hour Division
- Commissioner of Labor Statistics

Department of State

- Special Representatives of the President for arms control, nonproliferation, and disarmament matters, Department of State
- Ambassadors at large

Department of Transportation

- Administrator of the Saint Lawrence Seaway Development Corporation
- Deputy Administrator, Federal Aviation Administration
- Deputy Federal Highway Administrator

=== Other independent agency officials ===
United States Agency for International Development

- Assistant Administrator for the Bureau for Democracy, Conflict and Humanitarian Assistance
- Assistant Administrator for the Bureau for Economic Growth, Education and Environment
- Assistant Administrator for the Bureau for Global Health
- Assistant Administrator for the Bureau for Legislative and Public Affairs
- Assistant Administrator for the Bureau for Management
- Assistant Administrator for the Bureau for Africa
- Assistant Administrator for the Bureau for Asia
- Assistant Administrator for the Bureau for Europe and Eurasia
- Assistant Administrator for the Bureau for Latin America and the Caribbean
- Assistant Administrator for the Bureau for the Middle East

Other independent agencies

- Director of Selective Service
- President, National Consumer Cooperative Bank
- Director of the Institute of Museum and Library Services
- Commissioner, Office of Navajo and Hopi Indian Relocation
- Director of the International Broadcasting Bureau
- Deputy Administrator of General Services
- Deputy Administrator, Small Business Administration
- Deputy Director of the Peace Corps
- First Vice President of the Export-Import Bank of the United States
- Assistant Secretary for Science, Smithsonian Institution
- Assistant Secretary for History and Art, Smithsonian Institution
- Executive Vice President, Overseas Private Investment Corporation
- Director of Nuclear Reactor Regulation, Nuclear Regulatory Commission
- Director of Nuclear Material Safety and Safeguards, Nuclear Regulatory Commission
- Director of Nuclear Regulatory Research, Nuclear Regulatory Commission
- Executive Director for Operations, Nuclear Regulatory Commission
- Deputy Director, Institute for Scientific and Technological Cooperation
- Assistant Administrator for Toxic Substances, United States Environmental Protection Agency
- Assistant Administrator, Office of Solid Waste, United States Environmental Protection Agency
- Assistant Administrators, United States Environmental Protection Agency (8)
- Associate Administrator of the National Aeronautics and Space Administration

=== Executive Office of the President ===
- Deputy Director of the Office of Science and Technology
- Assistant Directors of the Office of Management and Budget (3)
- Members, Council of Economic Advisers

=== Boards and commissions ===
- Chairman, Federal Labor Relations Authority
- Chairman, Board of Veterans' Appeals
- Chairman, United States Parole Commission
- Members, United States International Trade Commission (5)
- Members, Board of Directors of the Export-Import Bank of the United States
- Members, Federal Communications Commission
- Member, Board of Directors of the Federal Deposit Insurance Corporation
- Directors, Federal Housing Finance Board
- Members, Federal Energy Regulatory Commission
- Members, Federal Trade Commission
- Members, Surface Transportation Board
- Members, National Labor Relations Board
- Members, Securities and Exchange Commission
- Members, Merit Systems Protection Board
- Members, Federal Maritime Commission
- Members, National Mediation Board
- Members, Railroad Retirement Board
- Members, Equal Employment Opportunity Commission (4)
- Members, National Transportation Safety Board
- Members, National Credit Union Administration Board (2)
- Members, Postal Regulatory Commission (4)
- Members, Occupational Safety and Health Review Commission
- Members, Consumer Product Safety Commission (4)
- Members, Commodity Futures Trading Commission
- Members, Federal Mine Safety and Health Review Commission

=== Obsolete positions ===
- Deputy Director of the Office of Emergency Planning
- Commissioner of Interamal

== Level V ==
5 U.S.C. § 5316 lists 143 positions that receive pay at Level V of the Executive Schedule. As of January 2025, the annual rate of pay for Level V positions is $183,100.

=== Agency directors ===
- Director, United States Travel Service (defunct), Department of Commerce
- National Export Expansion Coordinator, Department of Commerce
- Director, Defense Advanced Research Projects Agency, Department of Defense
- Administrator, Bonneville Power Administration, Department of Energy
- Chairman, Foreign Claims Settlement Commission of the United States, Department of Justice
- Commissioner of Vocational Rehabilitation, Department of Health and Human Services
- Commissioner of Welfare, Department of Health and Human Services
- Commissioner, Administration for Children and Families
- Director, Indian Health Service, Department of Health and Human Services
- Director, United States Fish and Wildlife Service, Department of the Interior
- Director, United States Bureau of Mines, Department of the Interior
- Director, United States Geological Survey, Department of the Interior
- Commissioner of Reclamation, Department of the Interior
- Commissioner of Indian Affairs, Department of the Interior
- Director, Bureau of Land Management, Department of the Interior
- Director, National Park Service, Department of the Interior
- Director, Bureau of Narcotics and Dangerous Drugs (defunct), Department of Justice
- Administrator, Wage and Hour and Public Contracts Division, Department of Labor
- Administrator, National Capital Transportation Agency (defunct)
- Chairman of the Federal Renegotiation Board
- Chairman of the Subversive Activities Control Board (defunct)
- Commissioner, Federal Supply Service, General Services Administration
- Commissioner, Public Buildings Service, General Services Administration
- Commissioners, Indian Claims Commission (5)
- Staff Director, Commission on Civil Rights
- Director, United States National Museum, Smithsonian Institution
- Director, Smithsonian Astrophysical Observatory, Smithsonian Institution
- Administrator, Environmental Science Services Administration
- Executive Director, Advisory Council on Historic Preservation
- Commissioners, United States Parole Commission (4)

=== Other officials ===
- Associate Administrators, Small Business Administration (4)
- Associate Administrators, National Aeronautics and Space Administration (7)
- Associate Deputy Administrator, National Aeronautics and Space Administration
- Deputy Associate Administrator, National Aeronautics and Space Administration
- Assistant Attorney General for Administration
- Assistant and Science Adviser to the Secretary of the Interior
- Assistant to the Secretary of Defense for Nuclear & Chemical & Biological Defense Programs, Department of Defense
- Chief Counsel for the Internal Revenue Service, Department of the Treasury
- Deputy Commissioner of Internal Revenue, Department of the Treasury
- Deputy General Counsel, Department of Defense
- Associate Director of the Federal Mediation and Conciliation Service
- Associate Director for Volunteers, Peace Corps
- Associate Director for Program Development and Operations, Peace Corps
- Assistants to the Director of the Federal Bureau of Investigation, Department of Justice (2)
- Assistant Directors, Office of Emergency Planning (3)
- Fiscal Assistant Secretary of the Treasury
- General Counsel of the Agency for International Development
- General Counsel of the Nuclear Regulatory Commission
- General Counsel of the National Aeronautics and Space Administration
- Manpower Administrator, Department of Labor
- Members, Federal Renegotiation Board
- Members, Subversive Activities Control Board (defunct)
- Deputy Under Secretaries of Defense for Research and Engineering, Department of Defense (4)
- Assistant Administrator of General Services
- Assistant Director (Program Planning, Analysis and Research), Office of Economic Opportunity
- Deputy Director, National Security Agency
- Special Assistant to the Secretary of Defense
- Assistant Secretary for Administration, Department of Transportation
- Associate Directors, Office of Personnel Management (5)
- Assistant Federal Highway Administrator
- Deputy Administrator, National Highway Traffic Safety Administration
- Deputy Administrator, Federal Motor Carrier Safety Administration
- Assistant Administrator, Federal Motor Carrier Safety Administration
- Vice Presidents, Overseas Private Investment Corporation (defunct) (3)
- Deputy Administrator, Federal Transit Administration, Department of Transportation
- General Counsel, Equal Employment Opportunity Commission
- Additional officers, Department of Energy (14)
- Additional officers, Nuclear Regulatory Commission (5)
- Assistant Administrator for Coastal Zone Management, National Oceanic and Atmospheric Administration
- Assistant Administrator for Fisheries, National Oceanic and Atmospheric Administration
- Assistant Administrators, National Oceanic and Atmospheric Administration (3)
- General Counsel, National Oceanic and Atmospheric Administration
- Members, Federal Labor Relations Authority (2)
- General Counsel, Federal Labor Relations Authority
- Additional officers, Institute for Scientific and Technological Cooperation (2)
- Additional officers, Office of Management and Budget (6)
- Associate Deputy Secretary, Department of Transportation
- Chief Scientist, National Oceanic and Atmospheric Administration
- Deputy Administrator, Drug Enforcement Administration (DEA), Department of Justice

== Presidential authority to place positions at levels IV and V ==
Per 5 U.S.C. § 5317, the president can at any time appoint no more than 34 individuals to pay rates Level IV and V, provided that they are viewed as a necessary change to organization, management responsibility, or workload within a specific agency. This figure is in addition to Level IV and V positions specifically authorized in the bill. However, Senate consent is required and the pay rate takes effect only upon a new appointment to that position. All actions taken during this process are to be published in the Federal Register, except when it is deemed that such publication would stand in conflict to national security. The president may not take action under this section with respect to a position, the pay for which is fixed at a specific rate by this subchapter, or by statute enacted after 14 August 1964.

The following positions are granted Level IV pay status of the Executive Schedule:

- Counselor to the Secretary, United States Department of the Treasury
- Deputy Under Secretary for International Labor Affairs, United States Department of Labor
- Administrator of the Substance Abuse and Mental Health Services Administration
- Executive Secretary of the National Security Council
- Administrator of the Office of Juvenile Justice and Delinquency Prevention
- Assistant Secretary of the Air Force
- Director of the Office for Victims of Crime
- Director of the Bureau of Justice Assistance
- Director of the National Institutes of Health
- Members of the Chemical Safety and Hazard Investigation Board (5)
- Commissioner on Aging (now Assistant Secretary for Aging, Department of Health and Human Services)

The following positions are granted Level V pay status:

- Deputy Assistant Secretary of Defense for Reserve Affairs, Department of Defense
- Counselor to the Secretary of Labor, Department of Labor
- Deputy Under Secretary for Education, Department of Education
- Commissioner of the Administration for Native Americans
