= American Crossroads =

Republican political organization in the US

- Formation: 2010; 16 years ago
- Tax ID no.: C00487363; 271937961; 272141277; 272753378
- Headquarters: P.O. Box 34413. Washington, DC 20043
- President and CEO: Steven J. Law
- Chairman of the Board: Mike Duncan
- Board Member: Jo Ann Davidson
- Website: https://www.americancrossroads.org/

American Crossroads is a US Super PAC that raises funds from donors to advocate for certain candidates of the Republican Party. It has pioneered many of the new methods of fundraising opened up by the Supreme Court's ruling in Citizens United v. FEC. Its president is Steven J. Law, a former United States Deputy Secretary of Labor for President George W. Bush and the Chairman of the Board of Directors is former Republican National Committee chairman Mike Duncan. Advisers to the group include Senior Advisor and former White House Deputy Chief of Staff Karl Rove and former Mississippi Governor Haley Barbour.

== History ==
American Crossroads was founded in 2010 by former Republican National Committee chair Ed Gillespie and former White House strategist Karl Rove. Rove's relationship to the group has been described as "informal," and the American Crossroads website makes no mention of his name.

In June 2010, American Crossroads established a spin-off 501(c)(4) group, Crossroads Grassroots Policy Strategies (Crossroads GPS). In 2015, likely due to difficulties securing tax-exempt status for Crossroads GPS, Rove and his associates took over an existing tax-exempt 501(c)(4), Alliance for America’s Future, and rebranded it as One Nation.

=== 2010 elections ===
American Crossroads raised $28 million in the 2010 election cycle.

=== 2012 elections ===
In the 2012 election campaign, American Crossroads spent about $105 million in independent expenditures, and Crossroads GPS spent $70.8 million, in part to promote what it called its New Majority Agenda. OpenSecrets found that American Crossroads spent money for or against 20 federal candidates in 14 election contests, with 3 of its preferred candidates winning, while Crossroads GPS spent money for or against 27 federal candidates in 24 elections, with 7 of its preferred candidates winning. American Crossroads and Crossroads GPS spent over $100 million to oppose presidential candidate Barack Obama and support his opponent Mitt Romney.

Rove defended Crossroads' performance in 2012, stating: "We did good things this year. But look, it’s the way of politics that you’re going to have some good years, and you’re going to have some bad years." A Romney campaign manager praised Crossroads and other Super PACs for "leveling the playing field [between Obama and Romney] in key target states". Crossroads' performance in the 2012 elections was criticised by conservative businessman and future president Donald Trump, and The Huffington Post reported dissatisfaction among anonymous donors to Crossroads.

=== 2013 immigration debate ===
Crossroads spent $100,000 on print ads promoting immigration reform through the "Border Security, Economic Opportunity, and Immigration Modernization Act of 2013" (S.744).

== Leadership ==
- Steven J. Law, president and CEO
- Mike Duncan, chairman of the board
- Jo Ann Davidson, board member
- Karl Rove Adviser+
- Carl Forti, political director
- Billy McBeath, digital director
- Chris Pack, communications director
- Mark McLaughlin, research director

In 2012, former Republican FEC appointee Thomas J. Josefiak was reported to be a legal adviser to American Crossroads.

== Funding ==
According to Federal Election Commission, IRS reports, analysis by OpenSecrets and other sources, American Crossroads' major contributors have included:

- Bob J. Perry, President of Perry Homes, Houston, Texas ($6 million)
- B. Wayne Hughes, founder of Public Storage Inc ($2.3 million)
- Trevor Rees-Jones, founder of Chief Oil & Gas, ($2 million)
- Robert Rowling, CEO of TRT Holdings, ($1 million)
- Dixie Rice Agricultural Corporation ($1 million)
- Southwest Louisiana Land ($1 million)
- Jerry Perenchio Living Trust ($1 million)
- American Financial Group, ($400,000)

== Crossroads GPS ==
Crossroads Grassroots Policy Strategies (Crossroads GPS) is a 501(c)(4) nonprofit corporation that works in conjunction with American Crossroads. As a 501(c)(4) nonprofit, Crossroads GPS's primary purpose is the advancement of social welfare including public policy advocacy, although it is permitted to engage in political spending as well. Crossroads GPS is required to report what it spends, but it is not required to publicly disclose donor information.

Steven J. Law is also the president of Crossroads GPS. The Board of Directors includes Sally Vastola and Bobby Burchfield. Its Vice President for Policy is Steven Duffield.

=== Debate over political activity by Crossroads GPS ===
In the 2010 national election cycle, Crossroads GPS spent millions attacking Democratic Senate candidates, and was the top spender in political advertising in Senate races.

In October 2010, Democratic Senator Richard Durbin wrote the IRS asking for it to investigate whether Crossroads GPS had violated its tax status. Republican senators had previously written to the IRS stating that an investigation into the political activities of tax-exempt groups would amount to a politically motivated tactic that would “chill the legitimate exercise of First Amendment rights.”

In September 2012, the Sunlight Foundation said that donor anonymity was critical to the fund-raising strategy of Crossroads GPS. Some critics accused non-disclosing political groups like Crossroads GPS of filing for nonprofit status solely to invoke the right to hide their donors. In November 2012, The Washington Post reported that Crossroads GPS failed to register as a non-profit organization in Virginia. The non-profit watchdog group Citizens for Responsibility and Ethics in Washington filed an ethics complaint with the Federal Election Commission and a corresponding letter with the FBI, alleging that Crossroads GPS failed to disclose the identities of contributors who donated $6 million specifically earmarked to fund independent expenditures for Josh Mandel's 2012 Ohio Senate race. Crossroads spokesman Jonathan Collegio dismissed the complaint as "frivolous."

=== Activity after the 2010 elections ===
Crossroads GPS demonstrated its interest in participating in non-electoral policy advocacy soon after the 2010 elections when it began running radio advertisements related to tax policy, urging Members of Congress to vote against tax increases.

An August, 2012 ProPublica analysis of broadcast television political advertising purchases in the 2012 national election cycle, by category, showed that two tax-exempt, non-profit social welfare groups, Crossroads GPS and Americans for Prosperity, combined, outspent all other categories, including political parties, political action committees, super PACs, unions, and trade associations.

== One Nation ==
One Nation is a 501(c)(4) nonprofit corporation that works in conjunction with American Crossroads. It is also run by Steven J. Law and has taken over political operations from the defunct Crossroads GPS since about 2016. During the 2020 election, One Nation spent nearly $200 million on political ad campaigns and funding the Mitch McConnell-aligned Senate Leadership Fund super PAC.

In 2026, One Nation launched a network of at least six news websites in states with competitive races in that year's midterm elections. These sites present themselves as independent local news outlets, but their content includes misleading news articles favorable to Republican candidates and articles copied from other news outlets. One Nation promoted these sites via advertising on Meta platforms. News websites known to be controlled by One Nation are:

- Alaska Navigator
- Maine Policy Updates
- Ohio Pulse
- Iowa Voice
- Peach State Post (Georgia)
- New Hampshire Daily

As of August 2026, One Nation spent $70.7 million in support of Republican candidates in the 2026 United States elections.

== Other associated organizations ==
American Crossroads shared office space with American Action Network, a group that promotes Republican candidates. Crossroads Media is a media services company that serves American Crossroads. Crossroads Media is run by Michael Dubke and David Carney, and Dubke also runs the Black Rock Group political consulting firm with Carl Forti, political director of American Crossroads. Dubke and Carney also founded Americans for Job Security, which shares office space with Crossroads Media and at least three other political consulting firms, including the Black Rock Group.

In 2013, Crossroads announced that it was financing a new effort, the Conservative Victory Project, to intervene in the next year's Republican primaries. Crossroads was not directly involved in the Kentucky 2014 Senate race, but backed Senator Mitch McConnell through a new group called Kentuckians for Strong Leadership. Although the group is legally separate from Crossroads, most of its cash came from Crossroads donors, Mr. Law sits on its board, and the two organizations share a treasurer. Crossroads has lobbied to help set up similar groups in races where its brand may be less appealing to voters or donors.
