= Jimmy Carter judicial appointment controversies =

During President Jimmy Carter's presidency, he nominated four people for four different federal appellate judgeships who were not processed by the Democratic-controlled Senate Judiciary Committee before Carter's presidency ended. None of the four nominees were renominated by Carter's successor, President Ronald Reagan. Three of the nominees who were not processed (Eugene Nickerson, Nicholas Bua and Howard F. Sachs) were nominated after July 1, 1980, the traditional start date of the unofficial Thurmond rule during a presidential election year. All four seats eventually were filled by appointees of President Ronald Reagan.

The four nominees were blocked in committee; no committee hearings ever were held for any of the three. The nominees were held up at the same time that in an unprecedented move, the Senate chose to take up Carter's November 13, 1980, nomination—after he already had lost the 1980 presidential election to Ronald Reagan—of Stephen Breyer to an appellate judgeship on the United States Court of Appeals for the First Circuit. The Senate wound up confirming Breyer (whom President Bill Clinton appointed to the United States Supreme Court in 1994) during the lame-duck session of the 96th Congress the following month. (Breyer's appellate court confirmation in 1980, which was the result of support from both Democrats and Republicans on the Senate Judiciary Committee, often is cited as evidence disproving the existence of the Thurmond Rule.)

During his presidency, Carter also nominated 16 people for 15 different federal district judgeships who were never confirmed by the United States Senate.

== List of unconfirmed appellate nominees ==
- United States Court of Appeals for the Second Circuit
  - New York seat - Eugene Nickerson (judgeship later filled by Reagan nominee Lawrence W. Pierce)
- United States Court of Appeals for the Fifth Circuit
  - Texas seat - Andrew L. Jefferson, Jr. (judgeship later filled by Reagan nominee William Lockhart Garwood)
- United States Court of Appeals for the Seventh Circuit
  - Illinois seat - Nicholas Bua (judgeship later filled by Reagan nominee Richard Posner)
- United States Court of Appeals for the Eighth Circuit
  - Missouri seat - Howard F. Sachs (judgeship later filled by Reagan nominee John R. Gibson)

== Others who were considered for nomination ==
In 1978 or 1979, Carter strongly and publicly had considered nominating Joan Krauskopf, then a law professor at the University of Missouri, to a newly created seat on the United States Court of Appeals for the Eighth Circuit. However, Krauskopf received a "not qualified" rating from the American Bar Association because of an alleged lack of judicial experience. A White House staffer disputed that assertion, noting that the judges on the Eighth Circuit felt Krauskopf's teaching responsibilities had given her the requisite experience to handle the job, and that Krauskopf was thought by some in the ABA to be too liberal. Despite support for her candidacy by Missouri Senator Thomas Eagleton, Carter himself, on the recommendation of his attorney general, Griffin Bell, made the decision not to proceed with Krauskopf's nomination. Ultimately, Carter wound up nominating Richard S. Arnold to the seat in late 1979; he was confirmed in 1980.

== Unconfirmed district court nominees ==
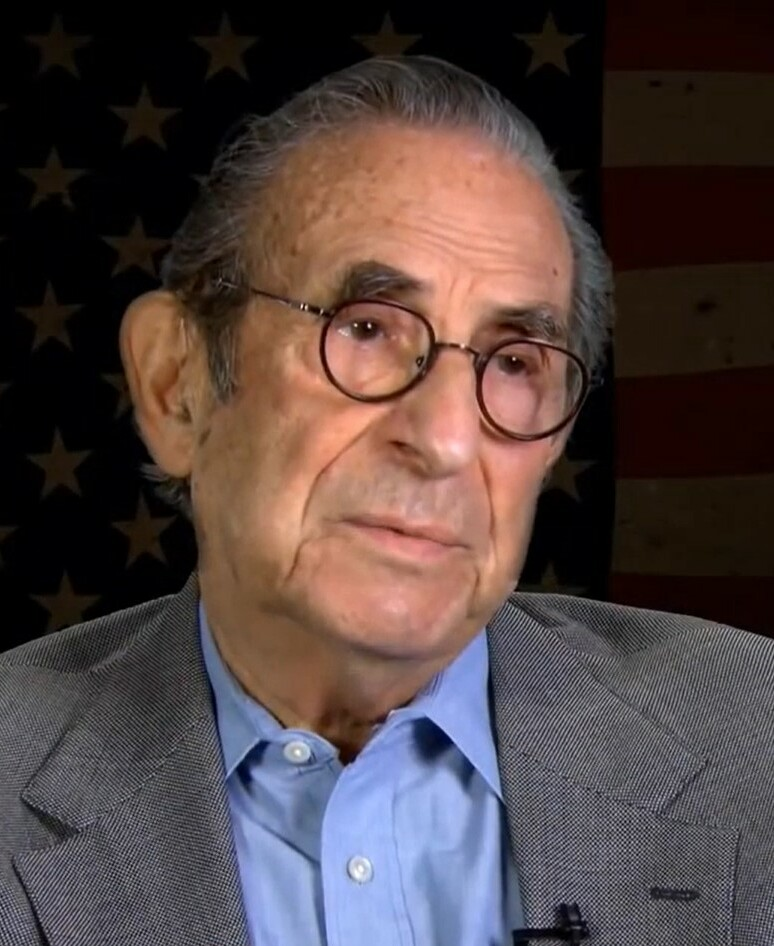
I. Leo Glasser

During his presidency, Carter nominated 16 people for 15 different federal district judgeships to federal district courts who never were confirmed by the U.S. Senate. Like the appellate court nominations mentioned above, many of these nominees were blocked by Republicans. One, however, was not confirmed because he died while his nomination was pending.

Of the 15 federal district judgeship vacancies in question, three eventually were filled with different Carter nominees and 12 were filled by nominees of President Ronald Reagan. Of Carter's 16 failed district court nominees, four, I. Leo Glasser, John E. Sprizzo, James Parker Jones and Ralph Wilson Nimmons, Jr., subsequently were nominated by Presidents Ronald Reagan, George H. W. Bush or Bill Clinton to federal district judgeships. Also, another of the 16, Walter Meheula Heen, was given a recess appointment to his district judgeship by Carter and as a result served as a federal judge for close to a year into the presidency of Reagan, who chose not to renominate and seek a full Senate vote on Heen.

The failed Carter district court nominees:

- United States District Court for the District of Maine
  - David G. Roberts (nominated August 26, 1980; judgeship later filled by Reagan appointee Conrad K. Cyr)
- United States District Court for the District of Puerto Rico
  - Miguel A. Gimenez-Munoz (nominated July 31, 1980; judgeship later filled by Reagan appointee Jaime Pieras, Jr.)
- United States District Court for the Eastern District of New York
  - Philip Weinberg (nominated September 17, 1980; judgeship later filled by Reagan appointee (and failed Carter nominee) I. Leo Glasser)
  - I. Leo Glasser (nominated September 17, 1980; judgeship later filled by Reagan appointee Joseph M. McLaughlin; Glasser later was appointed by Reagan to a different seat on the Eastern District of New York)
- United States District Court for the Southern District of New York
  - John E. Sprizzo (nominated June 2, 1980; judgeship later filled by Sprizzo himself, after President Reagan renominated him the following year)
- United States District Court for the Western District of Pennsylvania
  - Leonardo "Len" Paletta (nominated April 7, 1978; died while nomination was pending; judgeship later filled by Carter appointee Alan Neil Bloch)
- United States District Court for the Eastern District of North Carolina
  - Charles B. Winberry (nominated March 29, 1979, and withdrawn August 26, 1980; judgeship later filled by Reagan appointee James Carroll Fox)
  - S. Gerald Arnold (nominated August 26, 1980; judgeship later filled by Reagan appointee James Carroll Fox)
- United States District Court for the Eastern District of Virginia
  - James Edward Sheffield (nominated April 9, 1980; judgeship later filled by Reagan appointee James C. Cacheris)
- United States District Court for the Western District of Virginia
  - James Parker Jones (nominated on May 16, 1979; judgeship later filled by Reagan appointee Jackson L. Kiser; Jones later was nominated and confirmed to a different seat on the Western District of Virginia by President Clinton)
- United States District Court for the Western District of Texas
  - Peter M. Lowry (nominated August 26, 1980; judgeship later filled by Reagan appointee James Robertson Nowlin)
- United States District Court for the Northern District of Ohio
  - Gerald B. Lackey (nominated August 26, 1980; judgeship later filled by Reagan appointee Alvin I. Krenzler)
- United States District Court for the District of Hawaii
  - Walter Meheula Heen (nominated February 29, 1980, and renominated January 8, 1981; in the interim, Carter gave Heen a recess appointment to the District of Hawaii, and Heen served as a judge for close to one year of Reagan's presidency; the Senate never acted on Carter's nominations of Heen and Reagan never renominated him to the District of Hawaii; judgeship later filled by Reagan appointee Harold Michael Fong)
- United States District Court for the Middle District of Alabama
  - Fred Gray (nominated January 10, 1980; nomination withdrawn September 17, 1980; judgeship later filled by Carter appointee Myron Herbert Thompson)
- United States District Court for the Middle District of Florida
  - Ralph Wilson Nimmons, Jr. (nominated on September 17, 1980; judgeship later filled by Reagan appointee John H. Moore II; Nimmons later was nominated and confirmed to a different seat on the Middle District of Florida by President George H. W. Bush)
- United States District Court for the District of Columbia
  - Carin Clauss (nominated on September 19, 1978; judgeship later filled by Carter appointee Joyce Hens Green)

== See also ==
- United States federal judge
- Judicial appointment history for United States federal courts
- Deaths of United States federal judges in active service
