= M. Patricia Smith =

American politician (born 1952)

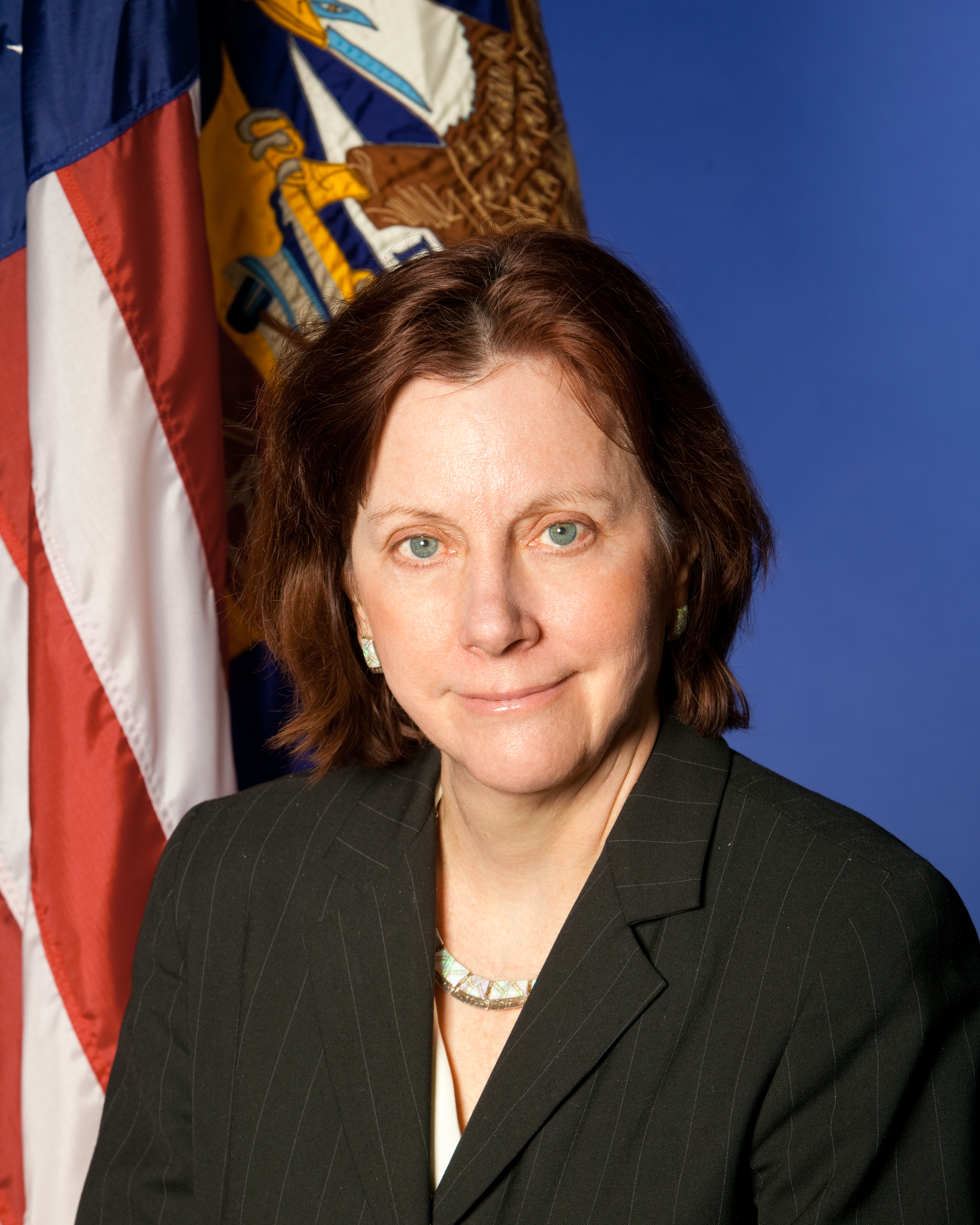

United States Solicitor of Labor
- In office March 1, 2010 – January 19, 2017
- President: Barack Obama
- Preceded by: Gregory F. Jacob
- Succeeded by: Kate S. O'Scannlain

United States Deputy Secretary of Labor Acting
- In office January 16, 2014 – April 4, 2014
- President: Barack Obama
- Preceded by: Seth Harris
- Succeeded by: Christopher P. Lu

Commissioner of the New York State Department of Labor
- In office 2007–2010
- Governor: Eliot Spitzer; David Paterson
- Preceded by: Linda Angello
- Succeeded by: Colleen Gardner

Personal details
- Born: 1952 (age 73–74)
- Education: Trinity College (BA); New York University (JD)
- Profession: Attorney

M. Patricia Smith (born 1952) was the Solicitor of the United States Department of Labor, the department's chief law interpreter-enforcer and third-ranking official from 2009 to 2017. She was nominated by President Barack Obama to be the Solicitor of Labor on April 20, 2009. She was confirmed by the U.S. Senate on February 4, 2010, assumed her duties on March 1, 2010, had her swearing-in ceremony on April 23, 2010, and remained in office until January 19, 2017. As Solicitor of Labor, Smith oversaw over 450 attorneys across the country and more than 180 Federal labor laws and implementing regulations that cover about 125 million workers.

On March 13, 2017, she joined the National Employment Law Project (NELP) as senior counsel.

From January to April, 2014 she also served as acting United States Deputy Secretary of Labor. Her successor, as Deputy Secretary of Labor Christopher P. Lu was confirmed on April 1, 2014.

Smith used to be the New York State Commissioner of Labor. She was appointed in 2007 by Governor Eliot Spitzer and continued in the administration of Governor David Paterson. As New York State's Commissioner of Labor, Smith managed a staff of nearly 4,000 employees and a budget of $11 billion. She was also in charge of the New York State's Misclassification task force and Co-Chair of the Governors Economic Security Sub Cabinet.

== Early life and education ==
She received her B.A.degree cum laude, from Trinity College in Washington, D.C. in 1974 and her J.D. degree from New York University School of Law, with honors, in 1977.

== Professional career ==
Smith has spent her entire career in public service. She served for twenty years as an Assistant Attorney General in the Labor Bureau of the office of the New York State Attorney General as a section chief (1987–93), then as Deputy Bureau Chief (1993–99), and as the Bureau Chief (1999–2007). During her later years in charge of the Labor Bureau she developed a system of active government labor law enforcement that became a model for other Attorneys General and enforcement agencies. Prior to that Smith spent ten years at federally funded legal services programs in Connecticut and Indiana, starting as a Staff Attorney and ending as Assistant Litigation Director. In her legal services work, Smith represented unemployment claimants, minimum wage workers, workers in federal job training programs and job seekers.

While at the New York State Attorney General's office, Smith argued cases in the U.S. Supreme Court including a pivotal case in which the Supreme Court signaled that the courts had gone too far in overturning various state laws based on claims that they "relate to" employee benefit plans that are regulated by federal law.

== Public service ==
=== Nomination to the Labor Department ===
President Barack Obama nominated Smith to be solicitor, which is the third-highest-ranking person in the Labor Department, on April 20, 2009. Smith's nomination had been held up in the Senate because of Republican opposition stemming from statements she made to the Senate's HELP Committee in May 2009 about New York's Wage Watch program, which New York's Labor Commission had launched to find companies not paying proper wages. Smith told senators that state officials had developed the program, but documents later showed that a union and a public interest entity also had been involved. Smith also characterized the program as an educational one, but Republicans complained that documents revealed that it actually was an enforcement program.

After waiting for more than nine months, Senate Majority Leader Harry Reid filed for cloture on Smith's nomination. The Senate voted 60–32 on February 1, 2010, for cloture on Smith's nomination.

Republicans had noted that Senate Majority Leader Harry Reid had filed for cloture vote before then Senator-elect Scott Brown was seated. Brown's predecessor, appointed Democratic Sen. Paul G. Kirk, voted in favor of cloture and also in favor of the nomination.

The Senate confirmed Smith in a 60–37 vote on February 4, 2010.

=== Career after Obama administration ===
In November 2020, Smith was named a volunteer member of the Joe Biden presidential transition Agency Review Team to support transition efforts related to the United States Department of Labor by acting as the Senior Counselor to the Secretary of Labor.
