= Carl Forti =

American Republican Party strategist

- Born: June 29, 1972 (age 54); Rochester, New York, U.S.
- Education: George Washington University School of Media and Public Affairs
- Political party: Republican

Carl Forti (born June 29, 1972) is an American Republican Party strategist who is the political director of Karl Rove's American Crossroads Super PAC. He was political director for Mitt Romney in 2008. Prior to joining American Crossroads, Forti has co-founded the Black Rock Group and has been instrumental in the formation of Republican 527's and Super PACs. He has been referred to as "Karl Rove's Karl Rove", "one of the smartest people in politics you've never heard of," and "the Alexander the Great of the Republican independent expenditure world."

== Political activities ==
Forti has long been active raising funds and strategy for the Republican Party. He got his start in the mid 1990s, working at a small ad firm run by GOP consultant, Paul Wilson and steadily moved through the ranks. While working at the Republican National Committee during the 2006 elections, Forti managed their largest ever independent expenditure campaign, totaling $82 million.

In 2008, Forti joined Mitt Romney's Presidential Campaign. As his political director, Forti played a key role behind Romney's 11 primary and caucus victories. After Romney dropped out, Forti joined Freedom's Watch, a 501(c)(4) run by Sheldon Adelson with the goal of spending over $200 million for conservative causes. During the campaign, Freedom's Watch challenged Federal Election Commission (FEC) requirements to disclose their donors and ultimately won when the FEC ruled that outside spending groups didn't have to reveal their sources unless contributions were earmarked for specific ads.

In 2010, Forti attempted to circumvent FEC guidelines by using his firm, Black Rock Strategies to coordinate with campaigns and advise donors where to contribute. Ultimately the FEC rejected this approach. During the 2010 Elections, Black Rock Group worked on Joe DioGuardi's Senate Campaign while also doing work for American Crossroads.

In 2011, Forti helped establish the Romney supporting super-PAC, Restore Our Future, raising over $12 million in the first half of 2011 before joining American Crossroads as its political director.

=== Conflict of interest criticism ===
American Crossroads was accused of having conflicts of interest over the role of Carl Forti. American Crossroads defended Forti, telling Politico, “Carl is a contract employee with American Crossroads. He has other clients. We knew that he had other clients. But clearly, none of us are gonna be involved personally in the presidential campaign.”
