= Edward C. Hugler =

American government official (born 1950)

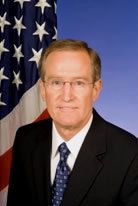

Acting United States Secretary of Labor
- In office January 20, 2017 – April 28, 2017
- President: Donald Trump
- Preceded by: Tom Perez
- Succeeded by: Alexander Acosta
- In office February 2, 2009 – February 24, 2009
- President: Barack Obama
- Preceded by: Howard M. Radzely (acting)
- Succeeded by: Hilda Solis

Personal details
- Born: Edward Charles Hugler; February 7, 1950 (age 76) Philadelphia, Pennsylvania, U.S.
- Education: University of Maryland, College Park (BA); Pepperdine University (JD)

Edward Charles Hugler (born February 7, 1950) is an American lawyer and former government official who served as the Deputy Assistant Secretary for Operations in the U.S. Department of Labor's Office of the Assistant Secretary for Administration and Management at the United States Department of Labor from April 2000 until March 2018. He served as Acting Secretary of Labor from February 2–24, 2009, when Hilda Solis's nomination by President Barack Obama became bogged down during Senate confirmation hearings. He stepped down from the position when Solis was confirmed and sworn in as Secretary of Labor. Ed Hugler also served as Acting Secretary of Labor from January 20, 2017, to April 28, 2017, when Alexander Acosta was confirmed and sworn into office.

As Deputy Assistant Secretary, Hugler oversaw day-to-day operations in the Department's Business Operations Center, Civil Rights Center, Emergency Management Center, Equal Employment Opportunity Office, Human Resources Center, Office of the Chief Information Officer, and the Security Center. From 1998 to 2000, he led the department-wide Year 2000 transition, preparing systems in the department's agencies for the year 2000, and managing associated contingency planning. He has also held posts in the Department's Mine Safety and Health Administration and Office of the Solicitor.

In 2015, Ed Hugler received the Samuel J. Heyman Service to America Medal Award for Management Excellence.

Political offices
Preceded by Howard Radzely; Acting	United States Secretary of Labor; Acting; 2009	Succeeded by Hilda Solis
Preceded by Tom Perez	United States Secretary of Labor; Acting; 2017	Succeeded by Alexander Acosta
