= List of undersecretary positions =

The following is a list of positions with the title Under Secretary or Under-Secretary.

== United Kingdom ==
=== Government ministerial positions ===
- Parliamentary under-secretary of state § List of parliamentary under-secretaries of state

=== Government official positions ===
- Permanent under-secretary of state § Current permanent secretaries

== United States ==
In the United States, the rank of Under Secretary denotes a high-level civilian official within the United States federal government. An official of sub-Cabinet rank, Under Secretaries are appointed by the President of the United States with the consent of the United States Senate and are assigned to assist a specific Cabinet Secretary. Under Secretaries often manage extensive portfolios within a Cabinet Department.

Under Secretaries are generally Level III positions within the Executive Schedule, ranking below the position of Deputy Secretary and above the position of Assistant Secretary. Since January 2010, the annual rate of pay for Level III is $165,300.

The Associate Attorney General and the Solicitor General, both of the Department of Justice, are ranked equivalent to an Under Secretary.

=== Department of Agriculture ===
- Under Secretary of Agriculture for Farm Production and Conservation
- Under Secretary of Agriculture for Food, Nutrition, and Consumer Services
- Under Secretary of Agriculture for Food Safety
- Under Secretary of Agriculture for Marketing and Regulatory Programs
- Under Secretary of Agriculture for Natural Resources and Environment
- Under Secretary of Agriculture for Research, Education, and Economics
- Under Secretary of Agriculture for Rural Development
- Under Secretary of Agriculture for Trade and Foreign Agricultural Affairs

=== Department of Commerce ===
- Under Secretary of Commerce for Economic Affairs
- Under Secretary of Commerce for Industry and Security
- Under Secretary of Commerce for Intellectual Property
- Under Secretary of Commerce for International Trade
- Under Secretary of Commerce for Minority Business Development
- Under Secretary of Commerce for Oceans and Atmosphere
- Under Secretary of Commerce for Standards and Technology

=== Department of Defense ===
- Under Secretary of Defense (Comptroller)/Chief Financial Officer
- Under Secretary of Defense for Acquisition and Sustainment
- Under Secretary of Defense for Intelligence and Security
- Under Secretary of Defense for Personnel and Readiness
- Under Secretary of Defense for Policy
- Under Secretary of Defense for Research and Engineering

==== Military Departments ====
- Under Secretary of the Air Force
- Under Secretary of the Army
- Under Secretary of the Navy

=== Department of Education ===
- Under Secretary of Education

=== Department of Energy ===
- Under Secretary of Energy for Infrastructure
- Under Secretary of Energy for Nuclear Security
- Under Secretary of Energy for Science and Innovation

=== Department of Homeland Security ===
- Under Secretary of Homeland Security for Intelligence and Analysis
- Under Secretary of Homeland Security for Management
- Under Secretary of Homeland Security for Science and Technology
- Under Secretary of Homeland Security for Strategy, Policy, and Plans

=== Department of State ===
- Under Secretary of State for Arms Control and International Security
- Under Secretary of State for Foreign Assistance, Humanitarian Affairs and Religious Freedom
- Under Secretary of State for Economic Growth, Energy, and the Environment
- Under Secretary of State for Management
- Under Secretary of State for Political Affairs
- Under Secretary of State for Public Diplomacy and Public Affairs
- Counselor of the Department (ranked equivalent to Under Secretary of State)

=== Department of Transportation ===
- Under Secretary of Transportation for Policy

=== Department of the Treasury ===
- Under Secretary of the Treasury for Domestic Finance
- Under Secretary of the Treasury for International Affairs
- Under Secretary of the Treasury for Terrorism and Financial Intelligence

=== Department of Veterans Affairs ===
- Under Secretary of Veterans Affairs for Benefits
- Under Secretary of Veterans Affairs for Health
- Under Secretary of Veterans Affairs for Memorial Affairs

== United Nations ==
- Under-Secretary-General of the United Nations
