= Thomas J. Josefiak =

Thomas Josefiak
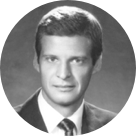

Member of the Federal Election Commission
- In office August 1981 to December 1991
- President: Ronald Reagan; George H.W Bush

Personal details
- Born: Adams, Massachusetts, U.S.
- Party: Republican
- Education: Fairfield University (BA); Georgetown University Law Center (JD)

Thomas J. Josefiak (born in Adams, Massachusetts) is an American lawyer who was Chief Counsel of Republican National Committee (RNC) and Chairman of the Federal Election Commission (FEC) during the 1988 U.S. presidential election. Josefiak is currently a partner with the law firm of HoltzmanVogelJosefiak PLLC in Washington, D.C.

== Education ==
Josefiak received his B.A. from Fairfield University and J.D. from the Georgetown University Law Center.

== Legal career ==
Josefiak successfully represented the appellants before the US Supreme Court in a Maryland redistricting case organized by the Fannie Lou Hamer Political Action Committee which brought African Americans and Republicans together. The appellants in Patricia Fletcher, et al., v. Linda H. Lamone et al. opposed the Democratic-passed 2011 plan.

Prior to joining HoltzmanVogel, subsequently renamed HoltzmanVogelJosefiak, Josefiak was of counsel at the RNC and of counsel to the 2008 Republican National Convention. Josefiak served as the chief counsel of the RNC from 1995 to 2007 after serving in various legal positions at the RNC beginning in 1992.

In 2012, Josefiak was reported to be a legal adviser to American Crossroads, the Super PAC established by Karl Rove.

Josefiak served as general counsel for Bush-Cheney '04 during the 2004 presidential election, where he was responsible for all of the campaign's legal matters. Following the election, he served as general counsel to the 55th Presidential Inaugural Committee. At the conclusion of the United States presidential inauguration, Josefiak returned to the RNC as chief counsel.

President Ronald Reagan appointed Josefiak to a six-year term as commissioner on the FEC in August 1985. He served as the Chairman of the FEC during the 1988 presidential election, and as vice chairman of the FEC and chairman of the Finance Committee in 1987.

Josefiak voted with the other two Republicans on the FEC not to pursue concerns that the influential Willie Horton ad in the 1988 presidential campaign involved illegal coordination between the George H. W. Bush campaign and the group which created and placed the ad, the National Security Political Action Committee. The vote was deadlocked along party lines.

Josefiak was special deputy to the Secretary of the United States Senate from 1981 to 1985, representing the Secretary as a full-time, ex officio commissioner at the FEC. As special counsel to the minority of the United States House Committee on House Administration from 1977 to 1979, he assisted Republican members in proposing and amending election law legislation, resulting in the passage of the 1979 amendments to the Federal Election Campaign Act. He was counsel to the National Republican Congressional Committee from 1977 to 1980, and served as a legislative assistant to U.S. Rep. Silvio Conte (R-Mass).
