= Carin Clauss =

First female Solicitor in the US Department of Labor

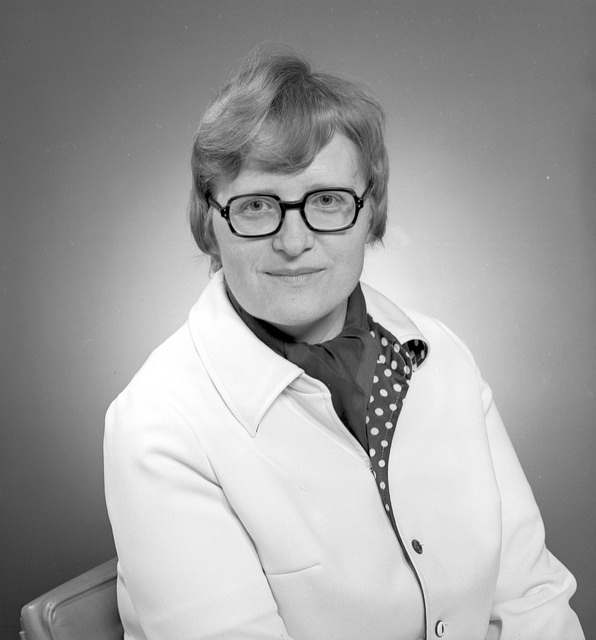
- Department of Labor photograph of Clauss

United States Solicitor of Labor
- In office 1977–1981
- President: Jimmy Carter

Personal details
- Born: January 24, 1939 (age 87) Knoxville, Tennessee, United States
- Education: Vassar College; Columbia Law School

Carin Ann Clauss (born January 24, 1939) was the first female United States Solicitor of Labor.

== Early life ==
Carin Ann Clauss was born on January 24, 1939, in Knoxville, Tennessee. She attended Vassar College, graduating in 1960 with a Bachelor of Arts. Three years later, Clauss graduated from Columbia Law School as one of six women in her class.

== Career ==
Following law school, Clauss worked at the United States Department of Labor in the Office of the Solicitor, joining the department in August 1963. During her tenure, she served as Deputy Counsel of Appellate Litigation in 1968 and 1969 and co-chaired the Labor Committee of the Federal Bar Association in 1968 and 1972. She also worked to develop the department's litigation strategy for enforcing the Equal Pay Act of 1963.

On February 24, 1977, President Carter announced his nomination of Clauss to serve as the Solicitor of the Department of Labor. She was confirmed the same year, becoming the first female solicitor of the Department of Labor. She served in that position until 1981.

In 1978, while she was still at the Department of Labor, President Carter nominated Clauss to be a United States District Judge for the District of Columbia. However, she declined to be considered a second time after her original nomination stalled due to Congress adjourning before considering her nomination.

After leaving the Department of Labor, Clauss taught at the University of Wisconsin–Madison, specializing in labor and employment law. She holds the Nathan P. Feinsinger Chair in Labor Law at the University of Wisconsin-Madison.

== See also ==
- Jimmy Carter judicial appointment controversies
- List of first women lawyers and judges in the United States
