= Michael J. Galvin =

American military United States Army Reserve Major general

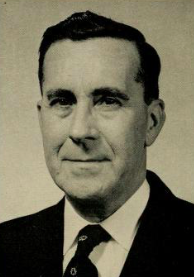
- Born: Michael J. Galvin; September 7, 1907; Charlestown
- Died: December 12, 1963 (aged 56); Chelsea, Massachusetts
- Burial place: Arlington National Cemetery
- Military career
- Allegiance: United States
- Branch: Massachusetts National Guard
- Service years: 1928–1963
- Rank: Major general
- Commands: 94th Infantry Reserve Division
- Conflicts: D-Day; Siege of Bastogne
- Awards: Silver Star; Two Bronze Stars; Legion of Merit; Croix de Guerre
- Other work: United States Under Secretary of Labor; Massachusetts State Senator

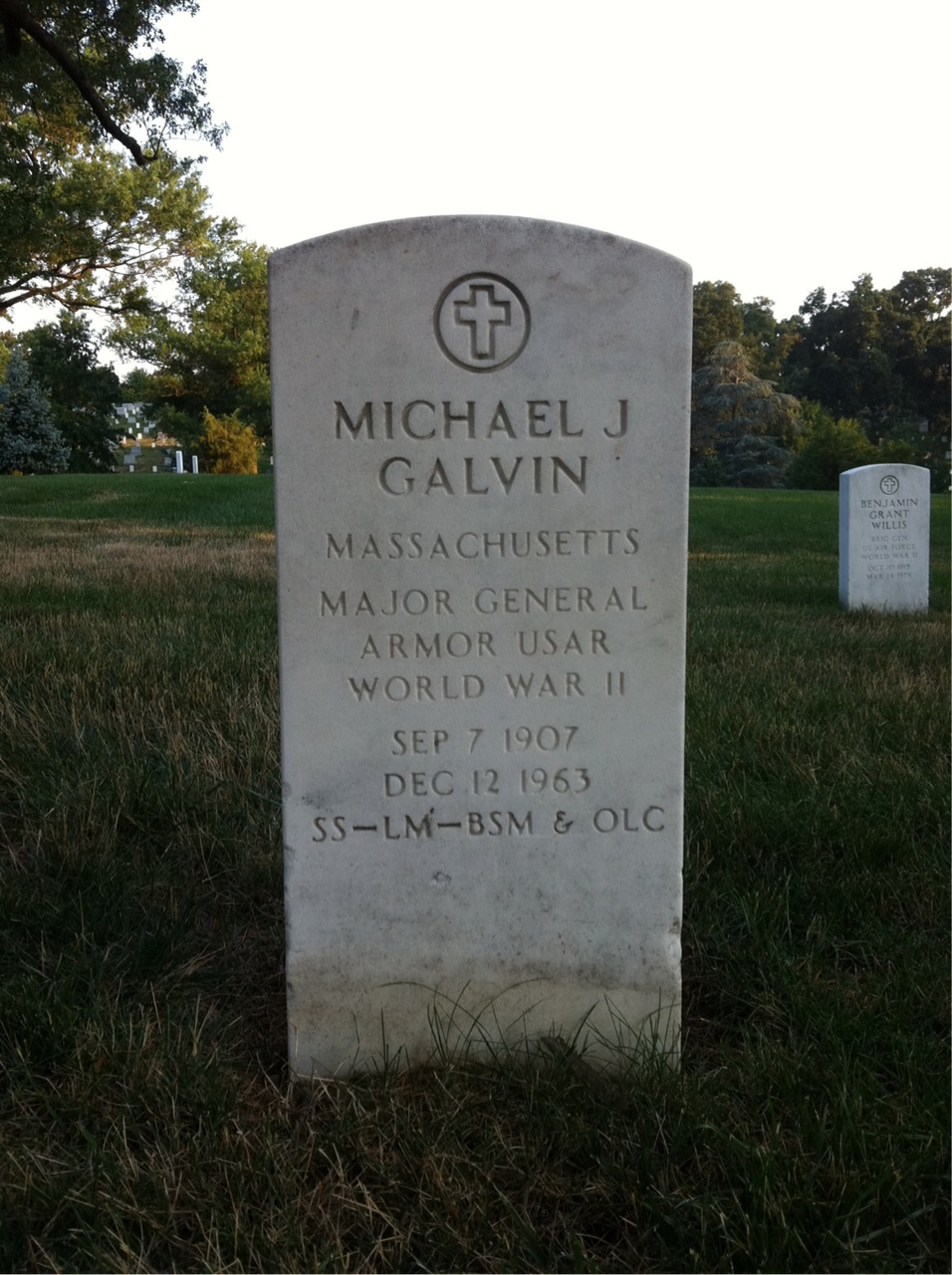
Grave at Arlington National Cemetery

Michael J. Galvin (1907−1963) was an American military United States Army Reserve Major general who served as commanding general of the 94th Infantry Reserve Division and was a member of the 6th Armored Division during World War II. After the war, Galvin served as United States Under Secretary of Labor and was a member of the Massachusetts Senate.

== Early life ==
Galvin was born on September 7, 1907, in Charlestown. In 1933 he graduated from the Northeastern University School of Business. He later graduated from the Northeastern University School of Law and spent sixteen years with Herrick, Smith, Donald, Farley and Ketchum.

== Military career ==
In 1928, Galvin enlisted as a private in the 9th Infantry Division. He went on active duty in 1940. General George Patton placed Galvin in the lead tank of his Flying columns. Galvin spent 280 days as a tank officer on the front line. He fought in Normandy on D-Day and at the Siege of Bastogne and was awarded the Silver Star, two Bronze Stars, the Legion of Merit, and the Croix de Guerre. He was wounded in action in 1944. From 1944 to 1945, Galvin was the operations chief of the 6th Armored Division. He was responsible for training the division and drawing up battle plans. Galvin later spent fifteen months as the 6th's intelligence chief. General George Marshall described Galvin as "the outstanding reservist in the war" before the United States Congress. He finished the war with the rank of colonel.

In 1959, Galvin became a brigadier general with the 94th Infantry Reserve Division. He, Gen. Chauncey Dean Merrill, and Gen. Costas L. Caraganis were responsible for creating a prototype Pentomic Division. In 1960, Galvin became commanding general of the 94th.

Galvin was the author of Manpower Limited, Manpower and National Defense, and Manpower Reserves for National Defense.

== Political career ==
On February 25, 1949, Galvin was nominated for the office of United States Under Secretary of Labor by president Harry S. Truman. He was recommended for the position by Secretary of Labor Maurice J. Tobin. In 1952 he led the United States delegation to a conference in Miami Beach, Florida, that discussed migratory labor agreements between the U.S. and Mexico. During the Eisenhower administration, Galvin was deputy coordinator of a team that campaigned for legislation in each state to authorize absentee voting for soldiers.

In 1962, Galvin was elected to the Massachusetts Senate. In September 1963 he became paralyzed from the waist down. He continued to serve in the Senate, where he fought for passage of the D.P.W. legislation which was later renamed the "Galvin Bill". Galvin died on December 12, 1963, at the Soldiers Home in Chelsea, Massachusetts. He was buried in Arlington National Cemetery. His papers were donated to the Harry S. Truman Presidential Library.

Government offices
| Preceded by David A. Morse | United States Under Secretary of Labor; 1949–1953 | Succeeded by Lloyd A. Mashburn |
| Preceded by Joseph Silvano | Member of the Massachusetts Senate from the Norfolk and Suffolk District; 1963–1963 | Succeeded by Beryl Cohen |
