= James J. Reynolds Jr. =

James Joseph Reynolds
- Born: January 8, 1907; Brooklyn, New York, U.S.
- Died: October 9, 1986 (aged 79); Washington, D.C., U.S.
- Education: Columbia University (BA)
- Spouse(s): previous marriage (unknown); Helen Reynolds
- Relatives: Quentin Reynolds (brother)

James Joseph Reynolds Jr. (January 8, 1907 – October 9, 1986) was the Under Secretary of Labor during the Lyndon B. Johnson Administration in the United States. Earlier he served as Assistant Secretary for Labor-Management Relations from 1961 to 1965, initially for President John F. Kennedy. Reynolds was an industrialist, and had been a member of the National Labor Relations Board under President Harry S. Truman.

Reynolds was born in Brooklyn, New York, to James Sr., a teacher and later Assistant Superintendent of Schools for the City of New York, and Katherine (née Mahoney). He graduated from Columbia University with the class of 1928, where he was classmates with future Undersecretary of Labor James T. O'Connell, and worked in finance on Wall Street, co-founding the firm Naumburg & Reynolds, later became Director of Labor Relations in the office of the president of United States Pipe & Foundry. He left when he enlisted in the United States Navy during World War II, holding a number of positions before joining the staff of the Under Secretary of the Navy as Special Assistant for labor issues, and mustered out in May 1946 with the rank of Commander. In August 1946, the Senate gave unanimous approval to President Truman's appointment of Reynolds to the National Labor Relations Board.

As Undersecretary of Labor for President Johnson, one of Reynolds' most well-known moments came in April 1968. Martin Luther King Jr. had gone to Memphis, Tennessee, to support African-American garbage workers during the Memphis sanitation strike. They had walked off the job to "protest unsafe conditions, abusive white supervisors, low wages, and to gain recognition for their union." On April 5, the day after the assassination of Martin Luther King Jr., President Johnson instructed Reynolds to go to Memphis to mediate the conflict and settle the strike. Within two weeks, Reynolds had developed a face-saving solution for Memphis Mayor Henry Loeb to sign a new deal with the union; Loeb had stymied unionization by refusing to authorize automatic payment of union dues from the sanitation-workers' paychecks, so Reynolds suggested that the city allow the workers to designate a portion of their paycheck – equal to at least the amount of their union dues – as savings deposited to a credit union under federal administration, which then transferred the appropriate amount to the union. Ultimately, the union was recognized and workers received a 5% raise, to $1.90/hour.

Reynolds died at Georgetown University Hospital in 1986.
