= Andrew L. Jefferson Jr. =

American lawyer

Andrew Leon Thomas Jefferson Jr. (August 19, 1934—December 8, 2008) was an American lawyer, a federal prosecutor, a Texas judge and a federal judicial nominee to the United States Court of Appeals for the Fifth Circuit. "The Judge", as he was affectionately known in the Houston community long after his tenure on the bench, was the first black judge above the municipal level in the state of Texas since the United States reconstruction era.

== Early life and education ==
Born in Dallas, Texas, Jefferson graduated from Jack Yates High School in Houston, Texas in 1952 and then earned a bachelor's degree from Texas Southern University in 1956. Jefferson earned a law degree from the University of Texas School of Law in 1959. Jefferson also served as a captain in the United States Army Reserve - Judge Advocate General's Corps and was honorably discharged.

== Professional career ==
After beginning his career in private legal practice, Jefferson became an assistant criminal district attorney for Bexar County in 1962, and later that year became the chief assistant to U.S. Attorney General Robert F. Kennedy for the Western District of Texas – a role he held for six years.

In 1968, Jefferson became a trial and labor relations lawyer for Humble Oil, which later became Exxon. From 1970 until 1975, Jefferson was a judge in Harris County, Texas. In 1975, Jefferson went into private legal practice in Houston, Texas. Judge Jefferson has received the Anti-Defamation League National Torch of Liberty Award, the Forward Times Newspaper Community Service Award, the Charles A. George Community Service Award and the League of United Latin American Citizens National Community Service Award (LULAC) from LaRaza. Judge Jefferson was known in the Houston community as a leader, pioneer and coalition builder who helped bridge the gap between young and old and those of different cultural backgrounds. Jefferson also served as chairman of the board of the Dallas Branch of the Federal Reserve Bank and of the Texas Southern University Foundation. In 1996, Jefferson became a member of the International Society of Barristers, a society of outstanding trial lawyers chosen by their peers on the basis of excellence and integrity in advocacy.

== Nomination to the Fifth Circuit ==
On October 11, 1979, President Jimmy Carter nominated Jefferson to a new seat as a federal judge on the United States Court of Appeals for the Fifth Circuit. During the Iran hostage crisis that began on November 4, 1979, many of President Carter's initiatives as well as his run for reelection were hamstrung. Despite Democrats holding a majority of 58 seats in the United States Senate at the time, the Senate did not act on President Carter's nomination of Jefferson before his presidency ended, and newly seated President Ronald Reagan, declined to renominate Jefferson to the seat. The seat to which Jefferson was nominated was filled by Reagan appointee William Lockhart Garwood on October 21, 1981.

== Trial Advocacy Endowment at Texas Southern University ==
In 2006, The Andrew L. Jefferson Endowment for Trial Advocacy at the Thurgood Marshall School of Law was established at Texas Southern University. The endowment exists to preserve the jury trial in order to consider issues of ethics and excellence in advocacy and the role of litigation in society. As of 2025, the university has created no publicized initiatives in conjunction with the reported 1 million dollars donated.

== See also ==
- Jimmy Carter judicial appointment controversies
