= Joan Krauskopf =

American law professor (born 1932)

Joan Miday Krauskopf (born April 24, 1932) is an American law professor who once was considered as a federal judicial nominee to the United States Court of Appeals for the Eighth Circuit.

== Early life and education ==
Born in Canton, Ohio, Krauskopf earned a bachelor's degree from Ohio University in 1954. She attended a year at UCLA School of Law before transferring to Ohio State University Moritz College of Law, from which she earned a law degree in 1957.

== Professional career ==
Krauskopf worked as an instructor at Ohio State University Moritz College of Law from 1957 until 1959, when she became an assistant professor. Around 1960, she moved to the University of Colorado School of Law, where she worked as a research and teaching assistant. In 1963, Krauskopf joined the faculty of the University of Missouri School of Law as a part-time instructor. She became a full professor at Missouri in 1974, becoming the R.B. Price Professor of Law at Missouri.

In 1987, Krauskopf rejoined Ohio State University Moritz College of Law as a professor. She retired in 1997.

== Consideration for nomination to the Eighth Circuit ==
In 1978 or 1979, President Jimmy Carter strongly and publicly considered nominating Krauskopf to a newly created seat on the United States Court of Appeals for the Eighth Circuit. However, Krauskopf received a "not qualified" rating from the American Bar Association because of an alleged lack of judicial experience. A White House staffer disputed that assertion, noting that the judges on the Eighth Circuit felt Krauskopf's teaching responsibilities had given her the requisite experience to handle the job, and that Krauskopf was thought by some in the ABA to be too liberal. Despite support for her candidacy by Missouri Senator Thomas Eagleton, Carter himself, on the recommendation of his attorney general, Griffin Bell, made the decision not to proceed with Krauskopf's nomination. Ultimately, Carter wound up nominating Richard S. Arnold to the seat in late 1979. He was confirmed in 1980.

== See also ==
- Jimmy Carter judicial appointment controversies
