= Seth Harris =

American politician (born 1962)

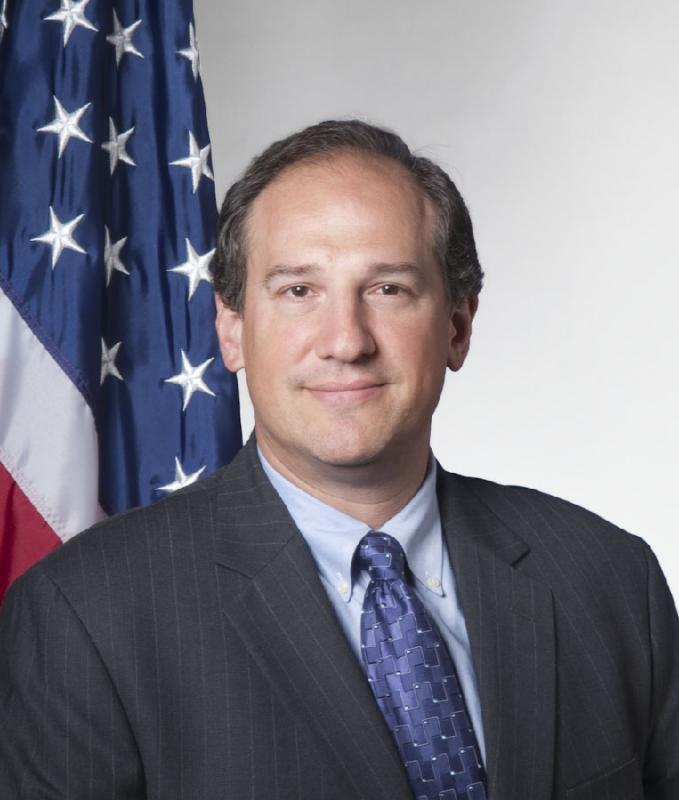

Acting United States Secretary of Labor
- In office January 22, 2013 – July 23, 2013
- President: Barack Obama
- Preceded by: Hilda Solis
- Succeeded by: Tom Perez

United States Deputy Secretary of Labor
- In office May 26, 2009 – April 3, 2014
- President: Barack Obama
- Preceded by: Howard Radzely
- Succeeded by: Chris Lu

Personal details
- Born: October 12, 1962 (age 64)
- Party: Democratic
- Spouse: Karen Rosen
- Education: Cornell University (BS); New York University (JD)

Seth D. Harris (born October 12, 1962) is an American attorney, academic, and former government official. Harris served under President Barack Obama as the 11th United States Deputy Secretary of Labor from 2009 to 2014. Nominated in February 2009, Harris was unanimously confirmed by the U.S. Senate in May 2009, and became acting Secretary of Labor for six months following the resignation of Hilda Solis in January 2013. Harris was also a member of the Overseas Private Investment Corporation's Board of Directors. Harris stepped down from his post on January 16, 2014.

After leaving the Obama administration, Harris has been a visiting professor at the Cornell Institute for Public Affairs and a distinguished scholar at Cornell University's School of Industrial & Labor Relations, and a lawyer in Washington, D.C. Harris also served as Deputy Assistant to the President for Labor and the Economy and deputy director of the National Economic Council during the Biden administration until July 2022.

Harris currently serves on boards of directors, advising early stage companies, and works as a professor of the practice in law and policy at Northeastern University.

== Early life and education ==
His father is the late Dr. Jonathan Harris, a high school teacher and author of young adult non-fiction books. His mother is Martha Harris, a retired high school librarian. Harris's brother is radio personality Paul Harris. Harris earned a B.S. from the Cornell University School of Industrial and Labor Relations in 1983 and was a member of the Quill and Dagger society. He later obtained a J.D. from New York University School of Law where he was editor-in-chief of the Review of Law & Social Change and a member of the Order of the Coif. Harris was a law clerk to Chief Judge Gene Carter of the U.S. District Court for the District of Maine and Judge William C. Canby, Jr. of the U.S. Court of Appeals for the 9th Circuit.

== Career ==
=== Prior Labor Department service ===
Harris served as Counselor to the Secretary and in other Labor Department policymaking roles for seven years advising both President Bill Clinton's first-term Labor Secretary Robert Reich and second-term Secretary Alexis Herman on legal, policy and management issues.

=== Academic career ===
For nine years prior to joining the Obama administration, Harris was a professor of Law and Director of Labor & Employment Law Programs at New York Law School. Harris's scholarship focused on the economics of labor and employment law, with a particular emphasis on the employment provisions of the Americans with Disabilities Act. He has also written about the National Labor Relations Act, the Fair Labor Standards Act, worker organizing, and employment discrimination laws in general.

Harris served as a Senior Fellow of the Life Without Limits Project of the United Cerebral Palsy Association and a member of Georgetown University Law School's Workplace Flexibility 2010 National Advisory Commission

=== Public service ===
Harris served as a member of the Agency Review Working Group of the Obama-Biden Transition Team with responsibility for the federal government's transportation, labor, and education agencies. Harris also chaired Obama for America's Labor, Employment and Workplace Policy Committee and Disability Policy Committee. He had served as a member of the Clinton-Gore Transition Team in 1992 and 1993.

In November 2020, Harris was named a volunteer member of the Joe Biden presidential transition Agency Review Team to support transition efforts related to the United States Department of Labor. He was reportedly considered for the position of Secretary of Labor in the Biden administration.

== Personal life ==
In 1997, Harris married Karen Beth Rosen, a social worker and psychotherapist. The couple has two sons.

== Articles and books ==
- Seth D. Harris, "Workers, Protections, and Benefits in the U.S. Gig Economy," GLOBAL LAW REVIEW (Forthcoming 2018)
- Seth D. Harris, “Is your Uber driver an ‘employee’ or an ‘independent contractor’?,” 2016 PERSPECTIVES ON WORK ___ (Lab. & Emplt. Res. Ass’n 2016) (forthcoming) (co-author)
- Seth D. Harris, “The Gig Economy: How to Modernize the Rules of Work to Fit the Times,” 18 MILKEN INST. REV. 16 (Q2 2016) (co-author)
- Seth D. Harris, “A Proposal for Modernizing Labor Laws for 21st-Century Work: The ‘Independent Worker’,” The Hamilton Project, Brookings Institution (Dec. 2015) (co-author)
- Seth D. Harris, “Managing for Social Change: Improving Labor Department Performance in a Partisan Era,” 117 W. VA. L. REV. 987 (Spring 2015)
- Harris, Seth D.; Slater, Joseph E.; Lofaso, Anne Marie; Gregory, David L. (2013). "Shop Law Books & Legal Research Guides". Modern Labor Law in the Private and Public Sectors: Cases and Materials. LexisNexis pub.
- Dau-Schmidt, Kenneth G.; Harris, Seth D.; Lobel, Orly (2009). Labor and Employment Law and Economics. Edward Elgar Pub. doi:10.4337/9781781953068. ISBN 9781781953068.
- Seth D. Harris and Michael Ashley Stein, "Workplace Disability" in Labor and Employment Law and Economics (Kenneth G. Dau-Schmidt, Seth D. Harris, and Orly Lobel, eds.), Edward Elgar Pub., 2009, webpage: "Labor and Employment Law".
- James P. Baker, David B. Mixner, and Seth D. Harris, The State of Disability in America: An Evaluation of the Disability Experience by the Life without Limits Project (UCP 2007), webpage: UCP-282, United Cerebral Palsy Association.
- Seth D. Harris, "The Mis-Directed Debate Over the Economics of Disabilities Accommodations," in Human Resources Economics and Public Policy: Essays in Honor of Vernon M. Briggs, Jr. (Charles J. Whalen, ed.), W.E. Upjohn Institute for Employment Research, 2009, webpage: Upj145.
- Seth D. Harris, "Law, Economics, and Accommodations in the Internal Labor Market," 10 U. PA. J. BUS. & LAB. L. 1 (Fall 2007).Social Science Research Network
- Seth D. Harris, "Disabilities Accommodations, Transaction Costs, and Mediation: Evidence from the EEOC's Mediation Program", 13 Harv. Negot. L. Rev. 1 (Winter 2008), webpage: SSRN-648, Social Science Research Network.
- Seth D. Harris, "Don't Mourn — Reorganize!: An Introduction to the Next Wave Organizing Conference Volume", 49 N.Y.L.Sch. L. Rev. 303 (2005-2006).Social Science Research Network
- Seth D. Harris, "Innocence and The Sopranos", 49 N.Y. L. Sch L. Rev. 577 (2004-2005).Social Science Research Network
- Seth D. Harris, "Introduction: Understanding the Context for the 'Coehlo Challenge'", 48 N.Y. L. Sch. L. Rev. 711 (2004).Social Science Research Network
- Seth D. Harris, "Re-Thinking the Economics of Discrimination: US Airways v. Barnett, the ADA, and the Application of Internal Labor Markets Theory", 89 Iowa L. Rev. 123 (Oct. 2003).Social Science Research Network
- Seth D. Harris, "Coase's Paradox and the Inefficiency of Permanent Strike Replacements", 80 Wash. U. L.Q. 1185 (2002).Social Science Research Network
- Seth D. Harris, "Conceptions of Fairness and the Fair Labor Standards Act", 18 Hofstra Lab. & Emp. L. J. 19 (Fall 2000).Social Science Research Network
- Seth D. Harris, Note, "Permitting Prejudice to Govern: Equal Protection, Military Deference, and the Exclusion of Lesbians and Gay Men from the Military", 17 N.Y.U. Rev. L. Soc. Change 171 (1989-1990).
- "Old 9-to-5 Grind Begins to Look Good", Los Angeles Times (Op Ed), June 1, 2003 at M5.
- "A Short Transition (Thank Goodness)", Washington Post (Op Ed), December 20, 2000 at A35.
- "The Pizza Hut Subsidy", Washington Post (Op Ed), October 4, 2000 at A33.

Political offices
Preceded by Howard Radzely	United States Deputy Secretary of Labor; 2009–2014	Succeeded by Chris Lu
Preceded by Hilda Solis	United States Secretary of Labor; Acting; 2013	Succeeded by Tom Perez
