= U.S. Department of Energy, Office of Inspector General =

United States Department of Energy, Office of the Inspector General
- Seal of the U.S. Department of Energy
- Incumbent; Sarah Nelson; Acting since January 24, 2025
- United States Department of Energy
- Seat: Washington, D.C.
- Formation: 1977
- First holder: J. Kenneth Mansfield
- Deputy: Jennifer Quinones
- Website: energy.gov/ig/office-inspector-general

The U.S. Department of Energy Office of Inspector General (DOE OIG) is an Inspector General office created by the Department of Energy Organization Act of 1977. The Inspector General for the Department of Energy is charged with investigating and auditing department programs to combat waste, fraud, and abuse.

== History of Inspectors General ==
Inspector General	Appointment Date
Sarah Nelson (Acting)	January 24, 2025
Teri L. Donaldson	January 23, 2019
April Stevenson (Acting)	January 1, 2017
Rickey R. Hass (Acting)	October 1, 2015
Gregory H. Friedman	October 21, 1998
Gregory H. Friedman (Acting)	January 5, 1998
John C. Layton	January 6, 1986
James R. Richards	September 23, 1981
James K. Wright (Acting)	January 22, 1981
J. Kenneth Mansfield	May 24, 1978
Joseph Seltzer (Acting)	October 1, 1977
