= Lloyd A. Mashburn =

Former U.S. Deputy Secretary of Labor (born 1897)

Lloyd A. Mashburn (October 10, 1897-December 7, 1963) was United States Deputy Secretary of Labor during the presidency of Dwight Eisenhower.

Mashburn served in the U.S. Marine Corps during World War I and later became involved in organized labor, as a leader of the Los Angeles Lathers' Union. He succeeded to increasingly higher posts in organized labor until his appointment as California's Commissioner of Labor in 1943 by Governor Earl Warren.

In 1953, he was appointed United States Deputy Secretary of Labor, serving in that post until October 9, 1954.
