= Eugene Scalia =

American politician and attorney (born 1963)

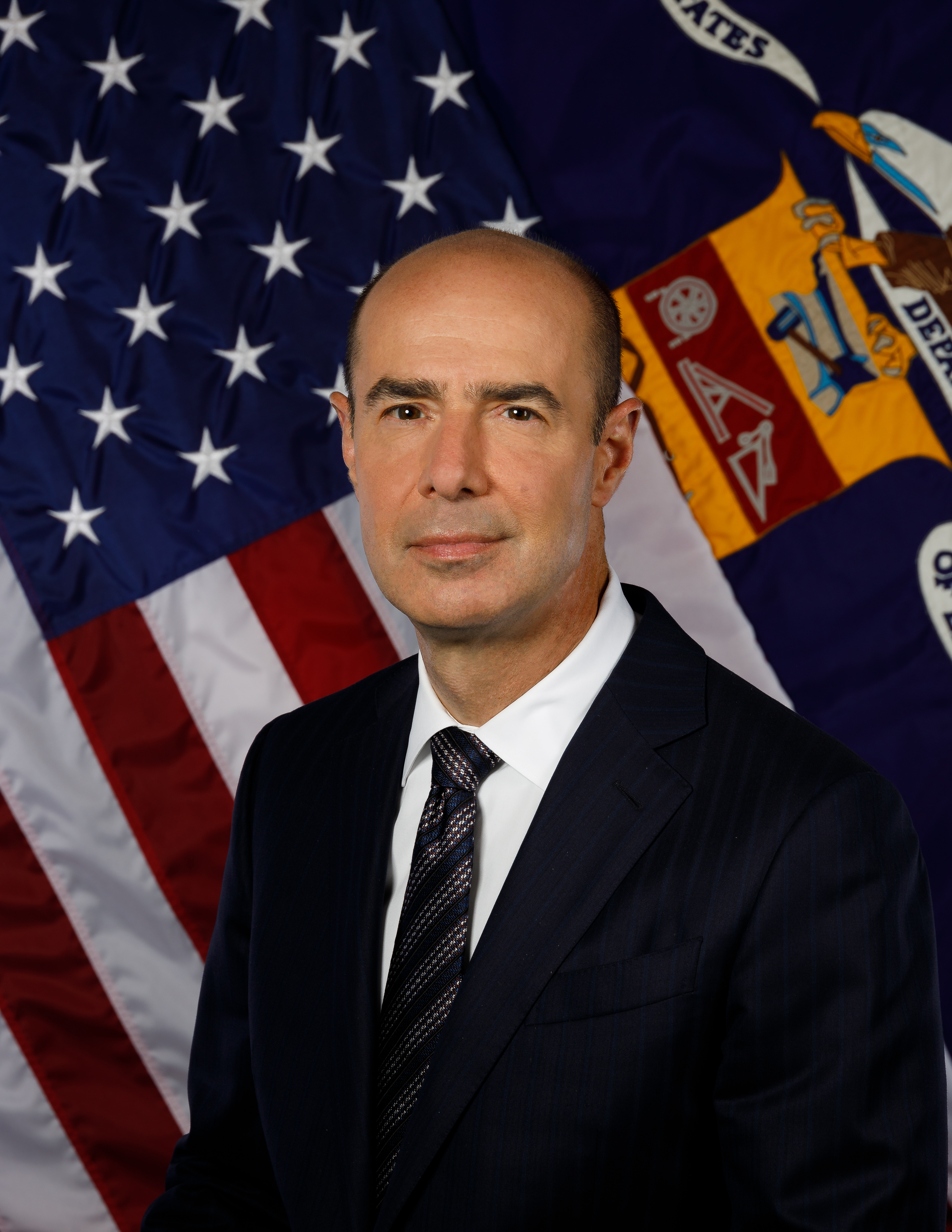
- Official portrait, 2019

28th United States Secretary of Labor
- In office September 30, 2019 – January 20, 2021
- President: Donald Trump
- Deputy: Patrick Pizzella
- Preceded by: Alexander Acosta
- Succeeded by: Marty Walsh

25th United States Solicitor of Labor
- In office January 11, 2002 – January 17, 2003
- President: George W. Bush
- Preceded by: Henry Solano
- Succeeded by: Howard M. Radzely

Personal details
- Born: August 14, 1963 (age 63) Cleveland, Ohio, U.S.
- Party: Republican
- Spouse: Patricia Larsen (m. 1993)
- Children: 7
- Relatives: Antonin Scalia (father)
- Education: University of Virginia (BA); University of Chicago (JD)

Eugene Scalia (born August 14, 1963) is an American lawyer who served as the 28th United States Secretary of Labor during the final 16 months of the first Trump administration from 2019 to 2021. Scalia previously served as the United States Solicitor of Labor under President George W. Bush. He is a son of the late Supreme Court Associate Justice Antonin Scalia.

Scalia was described by The New York Times as "a skilled lawyer with a broadly conservative, pro-business and anti-regulatory agenda". As Secretary of Labor, he reversed Obama-era labor and employment regulations. He returned to become a partner at Gibson Dunn at the end of his tenure.

== Early life and education ==
Scalia was born on August 14, 1963, in Cleveland, Ohio the second of nine children of future Supreme Court Justice Antonin Scalia and Maureen (née McCarthy) Scalia. He attended the University of Chicago Laboratory Schools, where he was known colloquially as "Gene" and graduated in 1981. Scalia became an editor of the school newspaper, U-High Midway, and had his column called "Blind Side". He also participated in soccer and debate; during his time as a student, Scalia was elected vice-president of the school's disciplinary board, beating classmate Arne Duncan, who would later be appointed U.S. Secretary of Education.

Scalia enrolled at the University of Virginia, where he graduated in 1985 with a Bachelor of Arts (B.A.) with distinction in economics and a minor in political science. He worked for the U.S. government for two years, then attended the University of Chicago Law School, where he became editor-in-chief of the University of Chicago Law Review. He graduated in 1990 with a J.D. degree, cum laude.

== Early legal career ==
Scalia first entered government service in the United States Department of Education as an aide to William J. Bennett, the U.S. Secretary of Education, from 1985 to 1987. From 1992 to 1993, he served as Special Assistant to Attorney General William P. Barr. Scalia was in private practice in Washington, D.C., and Los Angeles, California. In 2000, his firm, Gibson Dunn, represented George W. Bush before the U.S. Supreme Court in Bush v. Gore.

== Solicitor of Labor ==
He served as the Solicitor of Labor, having been appointed by President Bush in April 2001 and assuming the position in January 2002 following a recess appointment.

At the time, he was accused by Democratic senators and labor groups of being hostile to workers and criticized for his articles criticizing ergonomics.

A group of former career officials within the Department of Labor have since described Scalia as having been "very supportive of enforcement litigation to vindicate the rights of workers, both at the trial and appellate levels". In 2019, The New York Times wrote that Scalia "is perhaps best known for his opposition to a regulation that would have mandated greater protections for workers at risk of repetitive stress injuries". The regulation was repealed by Congress in 2001.

== Private legal practice ==
During his career in private practice, Scalia has defended major corporations against financial and labor regulations.

Writing in The New Yorker, Eyal Press said: "as a corporate lawyer, Scalia has repeatedly hindered the efforts of workers to secure benefits or defend their rights." After leaving the Bush administration, he helped Wall Street firms oppose financial oversight and criticized banking regulations put in place under Obama.

Scalia argued for the plaintiffs in Wal-Mart v. Maryland in July 2006, which invalidated a state law under which large companies with at least 10,000 employees would have been required to spend at least 8% of their payroll on employee healthcare.

Following his term as Secretary of Labor, Scalia returned to private practice at Gibson Dunn, where he is co-chair of the firm's administrative law and regulatory practice group.

== Secretary of Labor (2019–2021) ==
=== Nomination and confirmation ===
On July 18, 2019, President Donald Trump announced he would nominate Scalia to be the next Secretary of Labor. On September 26, 2019, the Senate confirmed his nomination by a vote of 53–44. Scalia was sworn in by Vice President Mike Pence on September 30. Scalia is the only person to have served as both Solicitor and Secretary of Labor.

During his tenure in the Department of Labor, he weakened some labor and employment protections, drawing criticism from organized labor leaders.

Janet Herold, an Obama-era career appointee to the Labor Department, spearheaded a number of employment discrimination lawsuits against major technology companies, including the Oracle Corporation. In 2019, Herold filed a complaint in which she alleged that Scalia had abused his authority by intervening to settle a 2017 Labor Department lawsuit in which Oracle was being investigated for allegedly underpaying women and people of color. Scalia encouraged a settlement figure between $17 million and $38 million, which Herold considered too low. Oracle went on to win the case, with the Department of Labor deciding not to appeal the decision. The Department of Labor dismissed Herold's complaint against Scalia, saying that Herold's "retaliation allegations rest on erroneous speculation regarding matters she is not in a position to know" and that Scalia had not participated in settlement discussions with Oracle. Herold was fired by Scalia in January 2021 after refusing to accept a transfer to a non-legal position.

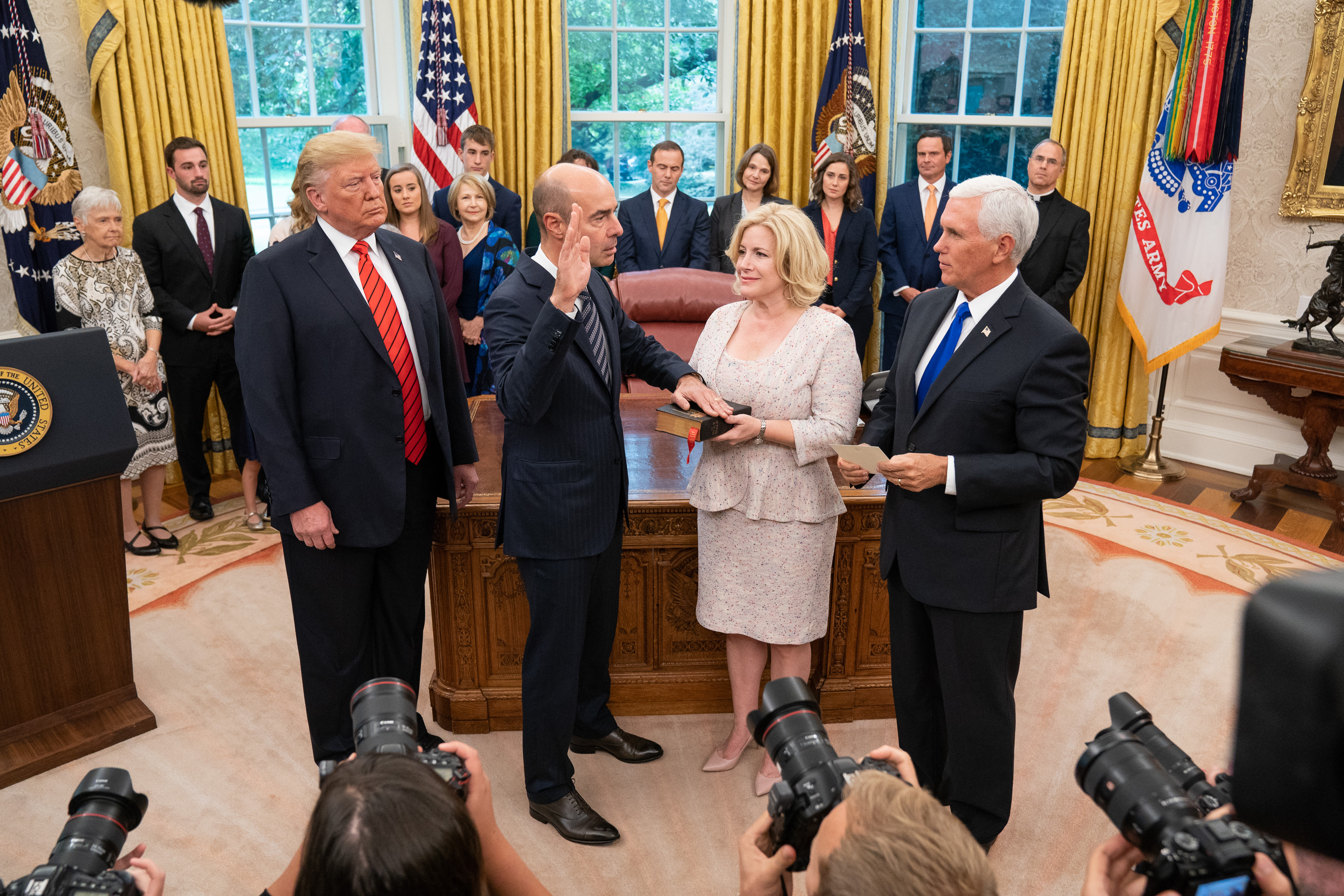
Scalia being sworn in as U.S. Secretary of Labor in 2019

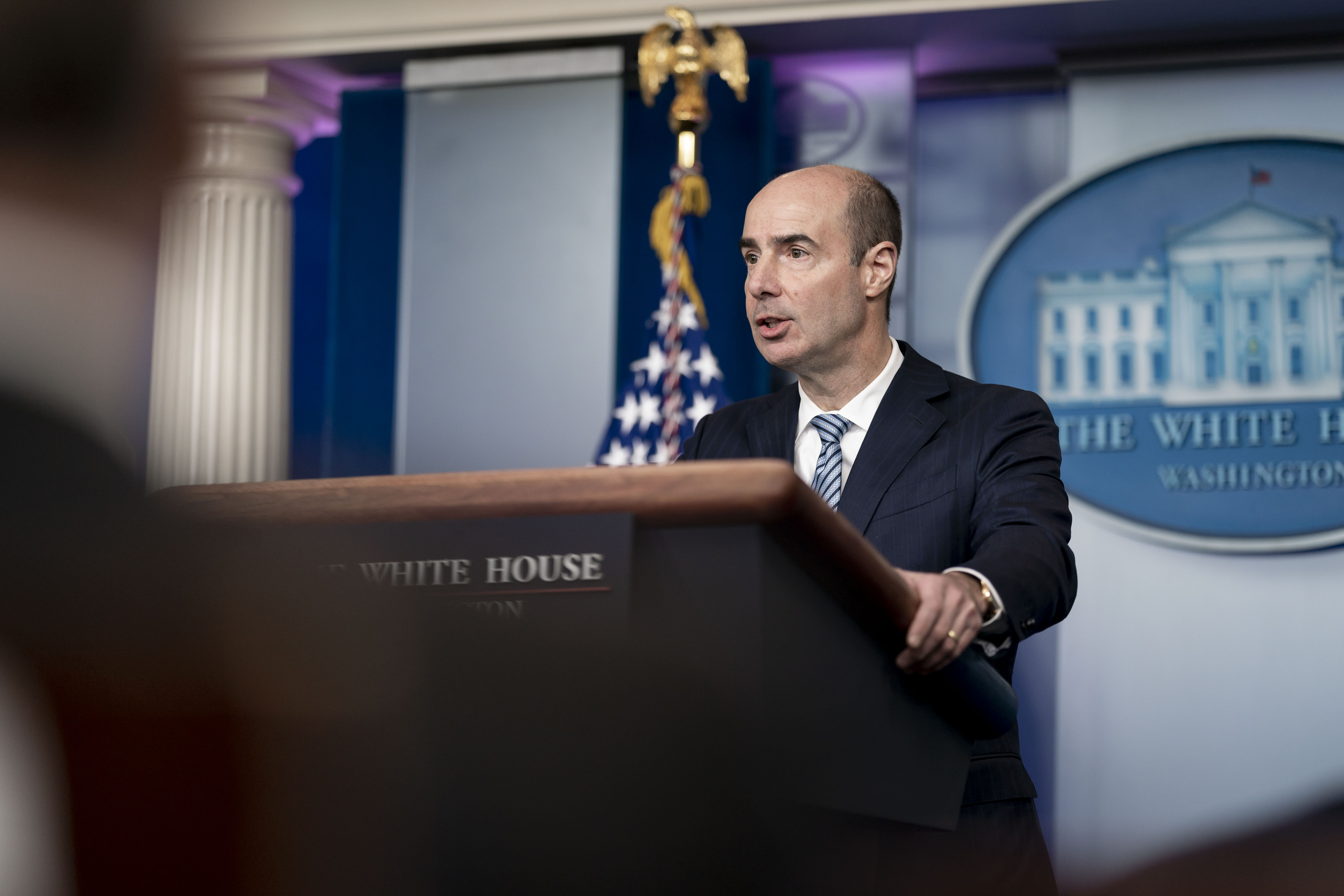
Scalia speaks at a press conference regarding coronavirus in the White House Press Briefing Room in April 2020

Political offices
| Preceded by Alexander Acosta | United States Secretary of Labor; 2019–2021 | Succeeded by Marty Walsh |
U.S. order of precedence (ceremonial)
| Preceded by Mark Esper as Former U.S. Cabinet Member | Order of precedence of the United States as Former U.S. Cabinet Member | Succeeded by Dan Brouillette as Former U.S. Cabinet Member |
