= William Lockhart Garwood =

American judge (1931–2011)

Senior Judge of the United States Court of Appeals for the Fifth Circuit
- In office January 23, 1997 – July 14, 2011

Judge of the United States Court of Appeals for the Fifth Circuit
- In office October 26, 1981 – January 23, 1997
- Appointed by: Ronald Reagan
- Preceded by: Seat established by 92 Stat. 1629
- Succeeded by: Priscilla Richman

Associate Justice of the Texas Supreme Court
- In office 1979–1981
- Appointed by: Bill Clements
- Preceded by: S. Johnson
- Succeeded by: C. L. Ray Jr.

Personal details
- Born: William Lockhart Garwood; October 29, 1931 Houston, Texas, US
- Died: July 14, 2011 (aged 79) Austin, Texas, US
- Education: Princeton University (BA); University of Texas School of Law (LLB)

William Lockhart Garwood (October 29, 1931 – July 14, 2011) was a United States circuit judge of the United States Court of Appeals for the Fifth Circuit.

== Education and career ==
Born in Houston, Texas, to Wilmer St. John Garwood (1896–1987) and Ellen Burdine Clayton (1903–1993), Garwood was named after his maternal grandfather, William Lockhart Clayton, a Houston cotton merchant and, as undersecretary of state for economic affairs, a principal architect of the post-World War II Marshall Plan.

Garwood received a Bachelor of Arts degree from Princeton University in 1952 and a Bachelor of Laws from the University of Texas School of Law in 1955. Upon graduating first in his law school class, he clerked on the United States Court of Appeals for the Fifth Circuit for John Robert Brown, a judge whom he would later count as a colleague on that same court. He served for three years as a JAG officer in the United States Army and then returned to Austin, Texas, where he entered private practice with the firm of Graves, Dougherty, Hearon, Moody & Garwood.

== State judicial service ==
On November 15, 1979, Garwood was appointed to the Supreme Court of Texas by Governor Bill Clements and became the first Republican to serve on that court since the end of Reconstruction. Notably, his father had served for a decade on the Texas high court, from January 14, 1948, to December 31, 1958, and is still regarded as one of Texas's finest jurists. The younger Garwood's tenure was shorter-lived however, ending on December 31, 1980. As he was fond of joking, "I was returned to private practice one-year later by popular mandate".

== Federal judicial service ==
On September 17, 1981, President Ronald Reagan nominated Garwood to a new seat on the United States Court of Appeals for the Fifth Circuit created by 92 Stat. 1629 (President Jimmy Carter previously had nominated Andrew L. Jefferson, Jr. to the seat, but the United States Senate had declined to act on Jefferson's nomination before Carter's presidency ended). Garwood was confirmed by the United States Senate on October 21, 1981, and received his commission on October 26, 1981. He assumed senior status on January 23, 1997, but maintained a nearly-full workload on the court until his death.

=== Notable opinions ===
In United States v. Lopez, 2 F.3d 1342 (5th Cir. 1993), Judge Garwood, writing for a unanimous panel, invalidated the Gun-Free School Zone Act as an unconstitutional exercise of the Commerce Clause power. When Lopez was affirmed by the United States Supreme Court, it became the first Court decision in nearly six decades to place limits on Congressional power under the Commerce Clause and was one of the first shots fired in the Rehnquist Court's Federalist Revival.

In United States v. Emerson, 270 F.3d 203 (5th Cir. 2001), Judge Garwood wrote the first federal appellate decision embracing the individual-rights view of the Second Amendment.

== Death ==
Garwood died in Austin on July 14, 2011, of a heart attack at age 79.

Legal offices
Preceded by Seat established by 92 Stat. 1629	Judge of the United States Court of Appeals for the Fifth Circuit; 1981–1997	Succeeded by Priscilla Richman
