= Steven J. Law =

American political executive

Steven J. Law is president and CEO of One Nation and American Crossroads, president of its sister organization Crossroads GPS, and president of the Super PAC Senate Leadership Fund. He previously held the position of Chief Legal Officer and General Counsel at the U.S. Chamber of Commerce. He served as Deputy Secretary of Labor in the administration of U.S. President George W. Bush. In 2005, Law chaired the President's Management Council Subcommittee on E-Government.

Law is a Phi Beta Kappa honors graduate of the University of California, Davis, and a graduate of Columbia Law School.
