= United States Deputy Secretary of Labor =

Position in US Department of Labor

- Seal of the Department of Labor
- Incumbent; Vacant since October 2, 2026
- United States Department of Labor
- Style: Deputy Secretary
- Reports to: United States Secretary of Labor
- Seat: Washington, D.C.
- Appointer: The president; with Senate advice and consent
- Term length: No fixed term
- Constituting instrument: 29 U.S.C. § 552
- Formation: March 4, 1913
- First holder: Louis F. Post
- Salary: Executive Schedule, level II
- Website: www.dol.gov

The United States deputy secretary of labor is the second-highest-ranking official in the United States Department of Labor. In the United States federal government, the deputy secretary oversees the day-to-day operation of the Department of Labor, and may act as secretary of labor during the absence of the secretary. The deputy secretary is appointed by the President with the advice and consent of the Senate and the Senate Health, Education, Labor, and Pensions Committee. The position is currently vacant, most recently held by Keith Sonderling who was confirmed on March 13, 2025 to the position. However, he was confirmed to be secretary of labor on September 30, 2026, and officially left the position on October 2, 2026.

== List of deputy secretaries of labor ==
The following is a list of deputy secretaries of labor or earlier equivalent positions.

#	Image	Name	Term
Assistant secretary (1913–1925)
1		Louis F. Post	1913–1921
2		Edward J. Henning	1921–1925
First assistant secretary (1925–1946)
3		Robe C. White	1925–1933
4		Edward F. McGrady	1933–1937
5		Charles V. McLaughlin	1938–1941
6		Daniel W. Tracy	1941–1946
–		John W. Gibson (Acting)	1946
Under secretary (1946–1986)
7		Keen Johnson	1946–1947
8		David A. Morse	1947–1948
9		Michael J. Galvin	1949–1953
10		Lloyd A. Mashburn	1953
11		Arthur Larson	1954–1956
12		James T. O'Connell	1957–1961
13		W. Willard Wirtz	1961–1962
14		John F. Henning	1962–1967
15		James J. Reynolds	1967–1969
16		James D. Hodgson	1969–1970
17		Laurence Silberman	1970–1973
18		Richard F. Schubert	1973–1975
19		Robert O. Aders	1975–1976
20		Michael Moskow	1976–1977
21		Robert J. Brown	1977–1980
22		John N. Gentry	1980–1981
–		Vacant	1981–1982
23		Malcolm R. Lovell, Jr.	1982–1983
–		Vacant	1983–1984
24		Ford B. Ford	1984–1986
Deputy secretary (since 1986)
25		Dennis E. Whitfield	1986–1989
26		Roderick DeArment	1989–1992
27		Delbert L. Spurlock, Jr.	1992–1993
28		Thomas P. Glynn	1993–1996
–		Cynthia A. Metzler (Acting)	1996–1997
–		Vacant	1997–1998
29		Kathryn O. Higgins	1998–2000
30		Edward B. Montgomery	2000–2001
31		D. Cameron Findlay	2001–2003
32		Steven J. Law	2003–2007
33		Howard M. Radzely	2007–2009
34		Seth Harris	2009–2014
–		M. Patricia Smith	2014
35		Chris Lu	2014–2017
36		Patrick Pizzella	2018–2021
37		Julie Su	2021–2025
38		Keith Sonderling	2025–2026
