= United States Secretary of Labor =

Head of the U.S. Department of Labor

- Seal of the Department of Labor

- Flag of the secretary

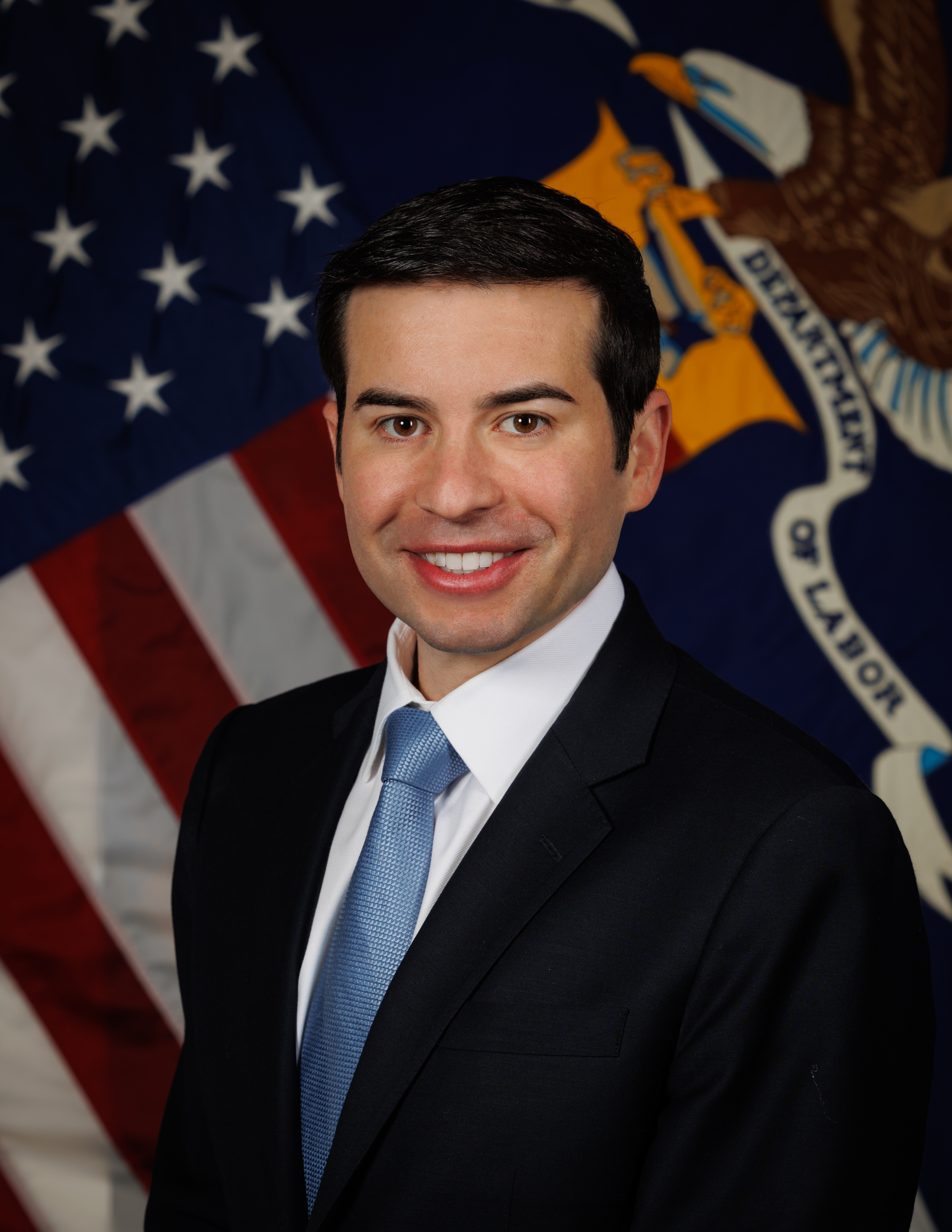
- Incumbent; Keith Sonderling since April 20, 2026 (Note: Acting: April 20, 2026 – October 2, 2026)
- United States Department of Labor
- Style: Mr. Secretary (informal); The Honorable (formal)
- Member of: Cabinet
- Reports to: President of the United States
- Seat: Frances Perkins Building, Washington, D.C.
- Appointer: The president; with advice and consent of the Senate
- Term length: No fixed term
- Constituting instrument: 29 U.S.C. § 551
- Precursor: Secretary of Commerce and Labor
- Formation: March 4, 1913; 113 years ago
- First holder: William B. Wilson
- Succession: Eleventh
- Deputy: Deputy Secretary of Labor
- Salary: Executive Schedule, Level I
- Website: dol.gov

The United States secretary of labor is a member of the Cabinet of the United States, and as the head of the United States Department of Labor, controls the department, and enforces and suggests laws involving unions, the workplace, and all other issues involving any form of business-person controversies.

Formerly, there was a Department of Commerce and Labor. That department split into two in 1913. The Department of Commerce is headed by the secretary of commerce.

Secretary of labor is a Level I position in the Executive Schedule, thus earning a salary of $253,100 as of January 2026.

Since October 2, 2026 the secretary is Keith Sonderling, who was confirmed by the Senate on September 30, 2026 having previously served as acting secretary from April 20, 2026 to October 2, 2026.

== List of secretaries of labor ==
Parties

Democratic (13) Republican (17)

Status

Acting secretary of labor

No.	Portrait	Name	State of residence	Took office	Left office	President(s)
1	Wilson	William Wilson	Pennsylvania	March 6, 1913	March 4, 1921	Woodrow Wilson (1913–1921)
2	Davis	James J. Davis	Pennsylvania	March 5, 1921	November 30, 1930	Warren G. Harding (1921–1923)
2	Davis	James J. Davis	Pennsylvania	March 5, 1921	November 30, 1930	Calvin Coolidge (1923–1929)
2	Davis	James J. Davis	Pennsylvania	March 5, 1921	November 30, 1930	Herbert Hoover (1929–1933)
3	Doak	William N. Doak	Virginia	December 9, 1930	March 4, 1933	Herbert Hoover (1929–1933)
4	Perkins	Frances Perkins	New York	March 4, 1933	June 30, 1945	Franklin D. Roosevelt (1933–1945)
4	Perkins	Frances Perkins	New York	March 4, 1933	June 30, 1945	Harry S. Truman (1945–1953)
5	Schwellenbach	Lewis B. Schwellenbach	Washington	July 1, 1945	June 10, 1948	Harry S. Truman (1945–1953)
6	Tobin	Maurice J. Tobin	Massachusetts	August 13, 1948	January 20, 1953	Harry S. Truman (1945–1953)
7	Durkin	Martin Durkin	Maryland	January 21, 1953	September 10, 1953	Dwight D. Eisenhower (1953–1961)
8	Mitchell	James P. Mitchell	New Jersey	October 9, 1953	January 20, 1961	Dwight D. Eisenhower (1953–1961)
9	Goldberg	Arthur Goldberg	Illinois	January 21, 1961	September 20, 1962	John F. Kennedy (1961–1963)
10	Wirtz	W. Willard Wirtz	Illinois	September 25, 1962	January 20, 1969	John F. Kennedy (1961–1963)
10	Wirtz	W. Willard Wirtz	Illinois	September 25, 1962	January 20, 1969	Lyndon B. Johnson (1963–1969)
11	Shultz	George P. Shultz	Illinois	January 22, 1969	July 1, 1970	Richard Nixon (1969–1974)
12	Hodgson	James Hodgson	California	July 2, 1970	February 1, 1973	Richard Nixon (1969–1974)
13	Brennan	Peter J. Brennan	New York	February 2, 1973	March 15, 1975	Richard Nixon (1969–1974)
13	Brennan	Peter J. Brennan	New York	February 2, 1973	March 15, 1975	Gerald Ford (1974–1977)
14	Dunlop	John Dunlop	Massachusetts	March 18, 1975	January 31, 1976	Gerald Ford (1974–1977)
15	Usery	William Usery Jr.	Georgia	February 10, 1976	January 20, 1977	Gerald Ford (1974–1977)
16	Marshall	Ray Marshall	Texas	January 27, 1977	January 20, 1981	Jimmy Carter (1977–1981)
17	Donovan	Raymond J. Donovan	New Jersey	February 4, 1981	March 15, 1985	Ronald Reagan (1981–1989)
18	Brock	Bill Brock	Tennessee	April 29, 1985	October 31, 1987	Ronald Reagan (1981–1989)
19	McLaughlin	Ann Dore McLaughlin	District of Columbia	December 17, 1987	January 20, 1989	Ronald Reagan (1981–1989)
20	Dole	Elizabeth Dole	Kansas	January 25, 1989	November 23, 1990	George H. W. Bush (1989–1993)
21	Martin	Lynn Martin	Illinois	February 22, 1991	January 20, 1993	George H. W. Bush (1989–1993)
22	Reich	Robert Reich	Massachusetts	January 22, 1993	January 20, 1997	Bill Clinton (1993–2001)
23	Herman	Alexis Herman	Alabama	May 1, 1997	January 20, 2001	Bill Clinton (1993–2001)
24	Chao	Elaine Chao	Kentucky	January 29, 2001	January 20, 2009	George W. Bush (2001–2009)
–	Radzely	Howard Radzely	Pennsylvania	January 20, 2009	February 2, 2009	Barack Obama (2009–2017)
–	Hugler	Ed Hugler	Pennsylvania	February 2, 2009	February 24, 2009	Barack Obama (2009–2017)
25	Solis	Hilda Solis	California	February 24, 2009	January 23, 2013	Barack Obama (2009–2017)
–	Harris	Seth Harris	New York	January 22, 2013	July 23, 2013	Barack Obama (2009–2017)
26	Perez	Tom Perez	Maryland	July 23, 2013	January 20, 2017	Barack Obama (2009–2017)
–	Hugler	Ed Hugler	Pennsylvania	January 20, 2017	April 27, 2017	Donald Trump (2017–2021)
27	Acosta	Alexander Acosta	Florida	April 28, 2017	July 19, 2019	Donald Trump (2017–2021)
–	Pizzella	Patrick Pizzella	Virginia	July 20, 2019	September 30, 2019	Donald Trump (2017–2021)
28	Scalia	Eugene Scalia	Virginia	September 30, 2019	January 20, 2021	Donald Trump (2017–2021)
–	Stewart	Al Stewart	Virginia	January 20, 2021	March 23, 2021	Joe Biden (2021–2025)
29	Walsh	Marty Walsh	Massachusetts	March 23, 2021	March 11, 2023	Joe Biden (2021–2025)
–	Su	Julie Su	California	March 11, 2023	January 20, 2025	Joe Biden (2021–2025)
–	Micone	Vince Micone	Washington, D.C.	January 20, 2025	March 11, 2025	Donald Trump (2025–present)
30	Chavez-DeRemer	Lori Chavez-DeRemer	Oregon	March 11, 2025	April 20, 2026	Donald Trump (2025–present)
31	Sonderling	Keith Sonderling	Florida	April 20, 2026	October 2, 2026	Donald Trump (2025–present)
31	Sonderling	Keith Sonderling	Florida	October 2, 2026	Incumbent	Donald Trump (2025–present)

== Line of succession ==
The former flag of the U.S. Secretary of Labor, used from 1915 to 1960.

The line of succession for the Secretary of Labor is as follows:

1. Deputy Secretary of Labor
2. Solicitor of Labor
3. Assistant Secretary for Administration and Management
4. Assistant Secretary for Policy
5. Assistant Secretary for Congressional and Intergovernmental Affairs
6. Assistant Secretary for Employment and Training
7. Assistant Secretary for Employee Benefits Security
8. Assistant Secretary for Occupational Safety and Health
9. Assistant Secretary for Mine Safety and Health
10. Assistant Secretary for Public Affairs
11. Chief Financial Officer
12. Administrator, Wage and Hour Division
13. Assistant Secretary for Veterans' Employment and Training
14. Assistant Secretary for Disability Employment Policy
15. Deputy Solicitor of Labor (First Assistant of the Solicitor of Labor)
16. Deputy Assistant Secretary for Policy (First Assistant of the Assistant Secretary for Policy)
17. Deputy Assistant Secretary for Congressional Affairs (First Assistant of the Assistant Secretary for Congressional and Intergovernmental Affairs)
18. Deputy Assistant Secretary for Employment and Training (First Assistant of the Assistant Secretary for Employment and Training)
19. Deputy Assistant Secretary for Policy (First Assistant of the Assistant Secretary for Employee Benefits Security)
20. Deputy Assistant Secretary for Occupational Safety and Health (First Assistant of the Assistant Secretary for Occupational Safety and Health)
21. Deputy Assistant Secretary for Mine Safety and Health (First Assistant of the Assistant Secretary for Mine Safety and Health)
22. Regional Solicitor—Dallas
23. Regional Administrator for the Office of the Assistant Secretary for Administration and Management—Region VI/Dallas

=== Secretary succession ===
If none of the above officials are available to serve as Acting Secretary of Labor, the Designated Secretarial Designee assumes interim operational control over the Department, except the Secretary's non-delegable responsibilities.

1. Director, Office of Federal Contract Compliance Programs
2. Director of the Women's Bureau
3. Regional Administrator, Employment and Training Administration—Dallas
4. Regional Administration, Occupational Safety and Health Administration—Dallas

== See also ==
- United States Deputy Secretary of Labor
- United States Department of Labor Office of Inspector General

== Notes ==
U.S. order of precedence (ceremonial)
Preceded by Howard Lutnick as Secretary of Commerce	Order of precedence of the United States as Secretary of Labor	Succeeded by Robert F. Kennedy Jr. as Secretary of Health and Human Services
U.S. presidential line of succession
Preceded by Secretary of Commerce; Howard Lutnick	11th in line	Succeeded by Secretary of Health and Human Services; Robert F. Kennedy Jr.
