= Paul Devinat =

French academic, civil servant and politician (1890–1980)

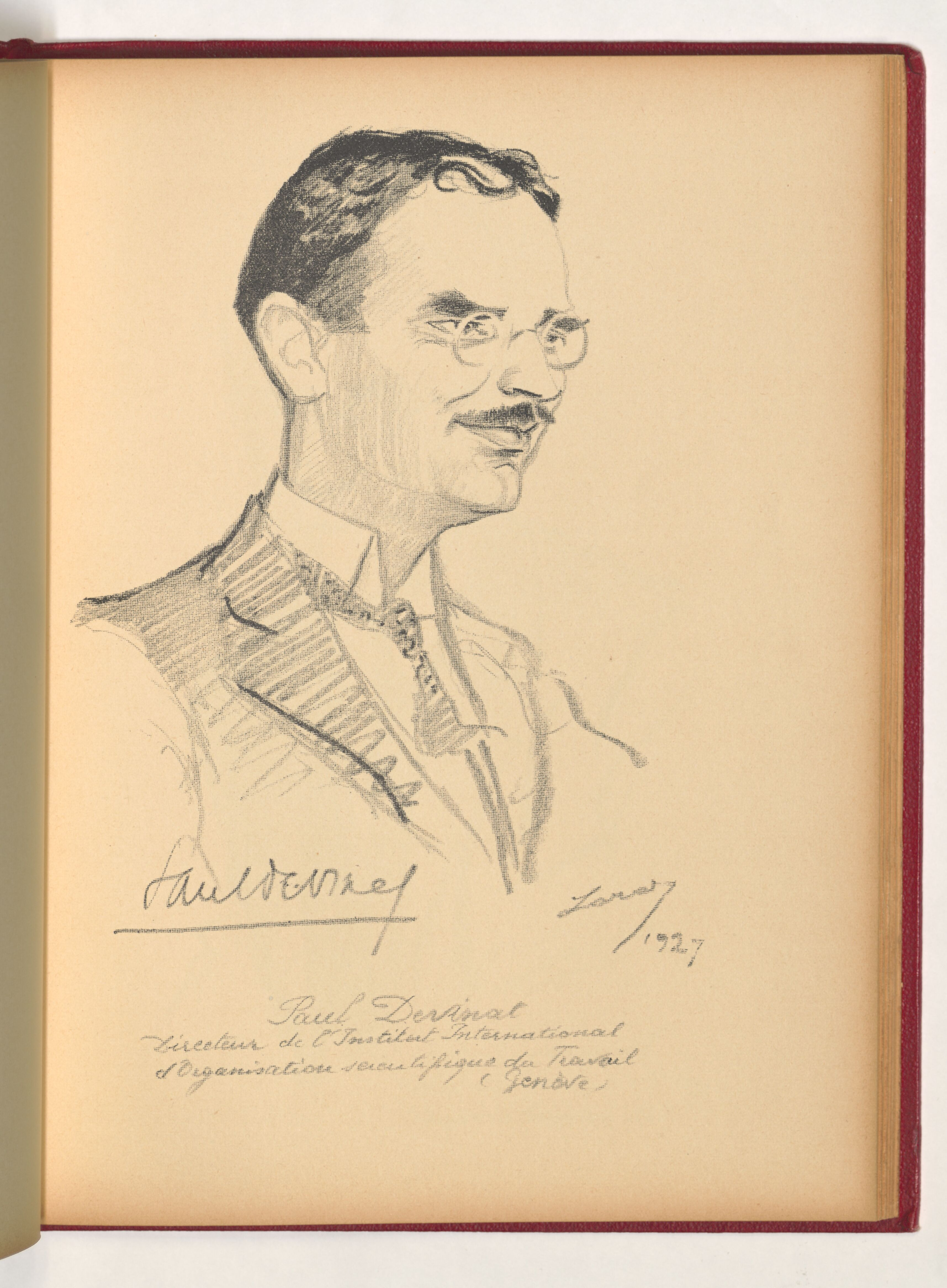
Paul Devinat in 1927

Ernest Paul Devinat (2 January 1890, Mâcon — 1 May 1980, Paris) was a French academic, civil servant and politician.

In 1922, Albert Thomas appointed Devinat as head of the International Labour Organization's Employers' Organization Service and they both toured the United States in the winter of 1922/3. They met Edward Filene, a wealthy advocate of scientific management who had founded the Twentieth Century Fund. Filene offered to provide funds for the proposed International Management Institute soon to be established in Geneva.

== Works ==
Selected works:

- 1912 Le Mouvement constitutionnel en Prusse de 1840 à 1847, Frédéric-Guillaume IV et les diètes provinciales, Nogent-le-Rotrou:Daupeley-Gouverneur;
- 1923 L'Organisation internationale du travail, Paris: F. Alcan : M. Rivière;
- 1927 L'organisation scientifique du travail en Europe;
- 1927 Les conséquences sociales de la rationalisation économique;
- 1935 La Politique agricole de la France with Henri Garnier;
- 1951 La Politique de l'Union française, Paris: Châteaudun;
- 1952 Formation de l'Europe;
- 1956 Un renouveau franco-vietnamien est-il possible?
