= Francis Blanchard =

French United Nations official

Francis Blanchard AC (21 July 1916 – 9 December 2009) was the second longest-serving Director-General of the International Labour Organization.

== Early life ==
Francis Blanchard was born on 21 July 1916 in Paris, France. After studying in Sorbonne, Blanchard undertook military service in the air force from 1937 to 1940. During the Second World War Blanchard worked as an assistant to a member of the Vichy government, but was involved in resistance activities whilst there.

== Major activities ==
In 1947, at the age of 31, Blanchard joined the International Refugee Organization, staying there until the organization ceased to exist in 1952, after which he aided in the formation of its successor agencies, the International Organization for Migration and the United Nations High Commissioner for Refugees. In 1951, Blanchard joined the International Labour Organization as deputy chief of the Manpower Division, involved with cooperation activities in vocational training and manpower. In 1956, then-Director-General David A. Morse appointed Blanchard to the position of Assistant Director-General.

In 1968, Blanchard was appointed Deputy Director-General with responsibility for technical cooperation and field activities. In 1973, he was appointed Director-General of the International Labour Organization. During his tenure as Director-General, the ILO saw the withdrawal of the United States from the Organization between 1977 and 1980, an action which led to the loss of a quarter of the Organization's budget. In 1989, Blanchard retired from the ILO, ending 38 years of service to the Organization and making him the second longest-serving Director-General in the Organization's history. As Director-General, he was preceded by C. Wilfred Jenks and succeeded by Michel Hansenne.

After his retirement, Blanchard made occasional appearances at International Labour Organization events before dying at the age of 93 on 9 December 2009.

== Honours ==
On 26 January 1990 he was appointed an Honorary Companion of the Order of Australia (AC), Australia's highest civilian honour, "in recognition of his service to humanity".

Positions in intergovernmental organisations
Preceded by C. Wilfred Jenks	Director-General of the International Labour Organization; 1974-1989	Succeeded by Michel Hansenne
