= UNIDO Institute for Capacity Development =

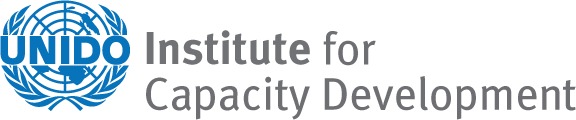
- Type: UN specialized agency
- Headquarters: Vienna, Austria
- Key people: Ludovico Alcorta (Director); Jacek Cukrowski (Chief)
- Website: www.institute.unido.org

The UNIDO Institute for Capacity Development was established in 2011 to respond to the industrial development challenges faced by UNIDO Member States. The overall aim of the institute is to strengthen UNIDO's academic partnerships, networking efforts, capacity-building and training activities. It provides training on key issues pertaining to sustainable industrial development. The organization also serves as a platform for knowledge creation, knowledge sharing, and as a catalyst for innovative solutions and ideas for addressing specific policy challenges for achieving more inclusive, sustainable globalization patterns.

== Areas of focus ==
The institute's functions are related to the areas of:

1. Knowledge Sharing
2. Training and Education
3. Joint Research
4. Policy Dialogue
5. Strategic Networking and Partnership

According to the UNIDO, the aim for the Institute for Capacity Development is to become a global core of excellence for learning, joint research, and capacity building, and a ‘virtual resource center’ for the community of practice in industrial development issues. The institute states that its mission is to enhance the quality of industrial policy by generating, disseminating, and sharing world-class knowledge resources and building capacities for sustainable industrial development, poverty reduction, and accelerated economic growth.
