= C. Wilfred Jenks =

- Born: Clarence Wilfred Jenks; 7 March 1909; Bootle, Lancashire, England
- Died: 9 October 1973 (aged 64); Rome, Italy
- Resting place: Geneva, Switzerland
- Title: Director-General, International Labour Organization
- Term: 1970-1973
- Predecessor: David A. Morse
- Successor: Francis Blanchard

C. Wilfred Jenks (7 March 1909 – 9 October 1973) was an international lawyer and director-general of the International Labour Organization (1970–1973).

== Early life and education ==
Clarence Wilfred Jenks was born 7 March 1909 in Bootle, Lancashire. His father, a merchant navy officer, drowned when Jenks was eleven and he assumed responsibility with his mother for the family.

Jenks was educated in state schools in Liverpool and, in 1926, he won an open scholarship to Gonville and Caius College, Cambridge and, in 1930, was president of the Cambridge Union. He was treasurer, British Universities League of Nations Society and chair, Cambridge University League of Nations Union. He twice won a scholarship to the Graduate Institute of International Studies in Geneva. He took a double first in history (1929) and law (1931) winning the Cecil Peace Prize in 1928 for a study on international arbitration.

== ILO ==
Upon finishing his studies at Cambridge, Jenks joined the International Labour Organisation (ILO) in Geneva as a legal adviser in the Legal Division. He became Assistant Director-General, Deputy Director-General, principal Deputy Director-General and Director-General. As Director-General, he was preceded by David A. Morse and succeeded by Francis Blanchard.

In 1936, he was called to the English bar by Gray's Inn.

In 1944, with acting Director Edward J. Phelan, he drafted the Declaration of Philadelphia which restated the ILO's aims and purposes, envisioning the ILO as the master economic agency among the specialised international bodies. He was part of the ILO delegation at a number of international conferences including:

- United Nations Monetary and Financial Conference at Bretton Woods, 1944
- San Francisco conference which established the United Nations, 1945
- International Conference on Peaceful Uses of Atomic Energy, 1955 and 1958
- United Nations Conference on Law of the Sea, 1958 and 1960
- United Nations Conference on Diplomatic Intercourse and Immunities, 1961
- United Nations Conference on Law of Treaties, 1968

Jenks carried for many years the main responsibility for the ILO's work in international labour standards and human rights.

== International legal scholar ==
Jenks was one of the most prominent and prolific writers on international law of his time. His publications on "Some constitutional problems of international organization" was once an unrivalled source of instruction on that subject for professionals and academics alike."

Jenks was Professor, Hague Academy of International Law in 1950, 1955 and 1966. He was Storrs Lecturer in Jurisprudence, Yale University, 1965.

== Personal and family life ==
In 1949, Jenks married Jane Louise Broverman of New York. They had two sons.

On 9 October 1973 Jenks was attending a session of the Institut de Droit International in Rome when he had a fatal heart attack. He was buried in Geneva.

== Awards and honours ==
C. Wilfred Jenks was awarded the following honours: 1928 Cecil Peace Prize 1959 American Society of International Law award 1967 Hon LLD, University of Edinburgh 1971 Hon LLD, University of Delhi 1971 Hon LLD, Seoul National University 1971 Hon LLD, University of La Plata 1972 Hon LLD, University of Costa Rica

Jenks was an honorary fellow of Gonville and Caius College, University of Cambridge and an honorary professor of Universidad Nacional Mayor de San Marcos de Lima and University of Lima.

== Publications ==
- (editor) The International Labour Code, 1939: A Systematic Arrangement of the Conventions and Recommendations Adopted by the International Labour conference, 1919-1939 (1941, 1952 revised edition: The International Labour Code, 1951: A Systematic Arrangement of the Conventions and Recommendations Adopted by the International Labour Conference, 1919-1951)
- (editor) Constitutional Provisions Concerning Social and Economic Policy: An International Collection of Texts Covering 450 Countries and Other Governments (1944)
- The headquarters of international institutions : a study of their location and status (1945)
- The international protection of trade union freedom (1957)
- The common law of mankind (1958)
- Human Rights and International Labour Standards (1960)
- International immunities (1961)
- The proper law of international organisations (1962)
- Law, freedom and welfare (1963)
- International law in a changing world (1963; with others)
- The prospects of international adjudication (1964)
- Space law (1965)
- Sovereignty within the law (1965; with Arnold Larson and others)
- Law in the world community (1967)
- A new world of law? A study of the creative imagination in international law (1969)
- Britain and the International Labor Office (1969)
- The world beyond the charter in historical perspective: a tentative synthesis of four stages of world organization (London, 1969)
- Social justice in the law of nations: the ILO impact after fifty years (1970)
- Orthodoxy and Innovation in the Law of Nations, Oxford University Press (1971)
- The International Labour Organisation in the U.N. family (1971)
- Social security as a world problem (Wellington, New Zealand, 1972)
- Prosperity for welfare: social purpose in economic growth and change (1973)
- Social policy in a changing world (selected lectures) (1976).

Contributor to British Yearbook of International Law and to legal journals.

== Bibliography ==
- Fiti Sinclair, Guy (2020). "C. Wilfred Jenks and the Futures of International Organizations Law". European Journal of International Law.

Positions in intergovernmental organisations
Preceded by David A. Morse	Director-General of the International Labour Organization; 1970-1973	Succeeded by Francis Blanchard
