= International Social Security Review =

- Discipline: Social security
- Language: English, French, German and Spanish
- Edited by: Roddy McKinnon

Publication details
- History: 1967-present
- Publisher: Wiley-Blackwell on behalf of the International Social Security Association
- Frequency: Quarterly

Standard abbreviations
- ISO 4: Int. Soc. Secur. Rev.

Indexing
- ISSN: 0020-871X (print); 1468-246X (web)

Links
- Journal homepage; Online access; Online archive

International Social Security Review is a quarterly peer-reviewed academic journal published by Wiley-Blackwell on behalf of the International Social Security Association. It was established in 1967 and is published in English, French, German and Spanish. It includes studies of social security systems in different countries. Topics covered include pensions, insurance, employment, and public benefits.
