= Comisión Clasificadora de Riesgo =

Chilean organization

Comisión Clasificadora de Riesgo (CCR) (Risk Rating Commission, RRC) is a Chilean organization which was established in 1985 with the incorporation of Chilean Decree Law Nº 3500 for approving or rejecting domestic and foreign debt instruments and equity securities that can be purchased by Pension Funds. Its risk rating system on equity securities is adopted by some of the International Social Security Association members.
