= Michel Hansenne =

Belgian politician

Member of the European Parliament for Belgium
- In office July 20, 1999 – July 19, 2004

Director-General of the International Labour Organization
- In office 1989–1999
- Preceded by: Francis Blanchard
- Succeeded by: Juan Somavía

Minister of Civil Service in Parliament of Belgium
- In office May 1988 – March 1989

Minister of Employment and Labour in Parliament of Belgium
- In office December 1981 – May 1988

Minister of French Culture in Parliament of Belgium
- In office April 1979 – December 1981

Member of the Parliament of Belgium
- In office 1974 – March 1989

Personal details
- Born: March 23, 1940 (age 86) Belgium

Michel Hansenne (March 23, 1940 in Belgium). He studied law and became a labour activist turned Belgium politician. In 1989 he was the first Director-General of the International Labour Organization since the end of the cold war. As Director-General, he was preceded by Francis Blanchard and succeeded by Juan Somavía. In 1999 he was elected as a Member of the European Parliament (MEP) from Belgium a post he held till 2004.

== Early life ==
Michel Hansenne was born on March 23, 1940. At the age of 23, Hansenne obtained a Doctor of Law, subsequently gaining a degree in Economics and Finance from the University of Liège. In 1962, Hansenne began working at the University of Liège as a researcher before beginning his career in politics in 1972.

== Belgium politics ==
In 1974, he became a member of the Parliament of Belgium, becoming Minister for French Culture from 1979 to 1981, Minister for Employment and Labour from 1981 to 1988 and Minister for Civil Service from 1988 to 1989.

== ILO and MEP ==
In 1989, Hansenne was elected the first post-Cold War Director-General of the International Labour Organization. Four years later, in 1993, Hansenne was elected for a second term. In 1997, during his time as Director-General of the ILO, Hansenne called for the certification of countries which adhere to his organisation's labour standards. In 1999, he was elected a Member of the European Parliament representing Belgium, the same year publishing a book, Un garde-fou pour la mondialisation. Le BIT dans l'après-guerre froide. Hansenne's European Parliamentary career was as a member of the Group of the European People's Party (Christian Democrats).

Whilst a Member of the European Parliament, Hansenne served on the Committee on Industry, External Trade, Research and Energy and the Delegation for relations with Japan, serving as a substitute on the Committee on Constitutional Affairs and Committee on Regional Policy, Transport and Tourism.

== Works published ==
In 1999 he wrote and published the book about the history of the ILO and how he navigated the changing times:

- Hansenne, Michel (1999). Un garde-fou pour la mondialisation: le BIT dans l'après-guerre froide (in French) (1999 ed.). Quorum. ISBN 2-88182-366-1.- Total pages: 151

Positions in intergovernmental organisations
Preceded by Francis Blanchard	Director-General of the International Labour Organization; 1989-1999	Succeeded by Juan Somavía
