= Seoul Declaration on Safety and Health at Work =

Declaration perpetuating national preventative safety and health culture

On June 29, 2008, the XVIII World Congress on Safety and Health at Work signed the Seoul Declaration on Safety and Health at Work. The declaration included statements concerning national governments' responsibility for perpetuating a "national preventive safety and health culture", for improving their national safe-workplace performance systematically, and for providing a health standard with appropriate enforcement to protect workers. The declaration also listed responsibilities of employers, stated the rights of workers, and emphasized the importance of promoting a culture of safety.

== The XVIII World Congress on Safety and Health at Work ==
Every three years, the International Labour Organization (ILO) and International Social Security Association (ISSA) organize a World Congress on Safety and Health at Work, bringing together government ministers, corporate leaders, health experts, and employer and worker representatives. The XVIII World Congress was sponsored by the Korea Occupational Safety and Health Agency (KOSHA) and convened from June 29, 2008 through July 2, 2008, in Seoul, South Korea. The Congress drew over 4,000 participants from 100 countries and resulted in the signing of the Seoul Declaration on Safety and Health at Work.

== Groundwork for the Seoul Declaration ==
The genesis of the Seoul Declaration came with the first Safety and Health Summit. The approximately 50 representatives at the Summit signed a Declaration of Safety and Health at Work. This document outlined standards through which workers, employers, and governments could collaborate to reduce workplace accidents and disease. The work was subsequently expanded upon, resulting ultimately in the Seoul Declaration later that year.

== Provisions of the Seoul Declaration ==
The Seoul Declaration recognizes worker safety as a basic human right and emphasizes workplace safety's positive impact on working conditions, productivity, and economic and social development. The declaration addresses government, employer, and worker responsibilities, and describes the commitment made by the document's signatories.

=== Government ===
The declaration urges governments to implement effective labor inspection systems that focus on improving national performance systematically. It encourages governments to ratify of the ILO Promotional Framework for Occupational Safety and Health Convention, 2006 (No. 187).

=== Employers ===
The declaration pronounces the relationship between high safety and health standards at work and good business performance. Employers are encouraged to implement management systems to improve workplace safety and health and to guarantee that workers are consulted, trained, informed and involved in the process.

=== Worker responsibilities ===
The declaration calls upon workers to follow safety and health instructions and procedures, to properly use personal protective equipment, to participate in safety and health training, and to cooperate with their employer in adhering to measures related to their safety and health at work.

=== Signatories ===
In accepting the Seoul Declaration, signatories committed to promote a preventive safety and health culture and push workplace safety in their various national agendas. Additional they agreed to revisit the declaration and review its progress at the next meeting of the Congress.
