= Albert Thomas (minister) =

French Socialist and minister

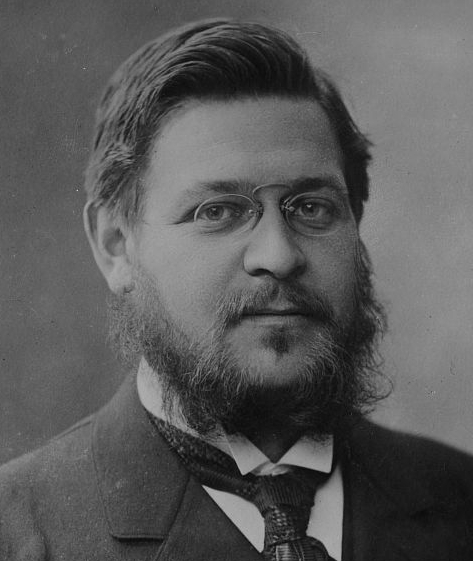
- Born: 16 June 1878; Champigny-sur-Marne, France
- Died: 7 May 1932 (aged 53); Paris, France
- Occupations: Politician, diplomat
- Known for: First Director General of the International Labour Office.
- Term: 1919–1932
- Successor: Harold Butler

Albert Thomas (16 June 1878 – 7 May 1932) was a prominent French socialist and the first Minister of Armament for the French Third Republic during World War I. Following the Treaty of Versailles, he was nominated as the first Director General of the International Labour Office, a position he held until his death in 1932. As Director-General, he was succeeded by Harold Butler.

== Early years ==
He was born at Champigny-sur-Marne on 16 June 1878. In 1898, he entered the École Normale Supérieure, where he studied history and won a travelling scholarship which enabled him to visit Russia. Other educational distinctions followed, including degrees in literature and history at the University of Paris. In 1904, Thomas was both appointed to the editorial staff of L'humanité and elected a municipal councillor for Champigny, where, eight years later he was elected mayor. As a journalist, Thomas wrote for L'information and the Revue socialiste founded the Revue syndicaliste and subsequently launched L'Information ouvrière et sociale.

== National politics and war ==
In 1910, Thomas was elected member of the Chamber of Deputies for one of the constituencies of the Department of the Seine, and he was re-elected in 1914. He became a member of the public works, railways, and finance committees of the Chamber and was active in shaping legislative measures, notably those relating to conditions in mines, industrial and agricultural workers pensions, and pensions for miners.

When the First World War broke out, Thomas served in a territorial regiment of the French Army for a few weeks after which he was summoned to Paris and placed in control of the railway services, acting as a link between the General Staff and the Ministry of Public Works. In October 1914, the Government gave him the task of organising factories with a view to the intensive production of munitions. In May 1915, he was appointed Under-Secretary of State for Artillery and Munitions, becoming Minister of Munitions the following year. Thomas first became a member of the cabinet on 12 December 1915 when he was made the Sub-Minister of Artillery and Munitions under the Minister of War. Due in large part to the need for more shells for the widely used "Soixante-Quinze" cannon, he was promoted again on 12 Dec 1916 to become Minister of Armaments. He answered only to the Prime Minister and subsequently President of the Republic, Raymond Poincaré. Thomas was removed from the Ministry on 12 September 1917 by Louis Loucheur.

== International Labour Office ==
Thomas was elected Deputy for the Tarn. In November 1919, during the inaugural Session of the International Labour Conference in Washington, at which he was not present, the Governing Body of the ILO chose him to be the Director of the Office. From then, Thomas gave himself up entirely to the work of the ILO.

Thomas gave ILO a strong impetus from the very beginning. In a few years, he created, out of a small group of officials housed in a private residence in London, an international institution with a staff of 400 and a building of its own in Geneva. In the first two years, 16 international Labour Conventions and 18 Recommendations had been adopted. From 1920 onwards, the ILO launched an ambitious programme of publications, which included the Official Bulletin, the monthly International Labour Review and various other periodicals and newspapers. As Director, Thomas took personal interest in recruiting an international team to form the Secretariat of the Organisation. His leadership helped to establish the image of the ILO as one of boundless enthusiasm and explosive energy.

Opposition between national governments, organised labour and employer representative bodies soon began to develop, and the optimism that had prevailed immediately following the end of the war gave way to doubt and pessimism. Some members sought to restrict the powers and activities of the Organisation. Firstly, it was felt that the Conference had gone too far and too quickly in the output of Conventions and Recommendations. National governments and parliaments could not or would not keep up. Thomas, noting the disappointing number of ratifications reached the conclusion that over-production of Conventions and Recommendations should stop.

The publications programme of the Office became a target for criticism, namely that its research was not objective and impartial. At the same time, efforts were being made to restrict the competence of the ILO. In 1921, the French government took the position that the ILO was not competent to deal with agricultural matters and the Permanent Court of International Justice was requested to give an advisory opinion on the question. The Court found that the competence of the ILO did extend to international regulation of the conditions of labour of persons in agriculture, rejecting a restrictive interpretation of the Constitution. Other attempts to induce the Court to restrict the scope of action of the ILO also failed in 1922 and 1926.

Another serious difficulty emerged over the financing of the Organisation. Under the Constitution, the ILO was dependent on the League of Nations for its financing, but in all matters of general policy the Constitution provided the ILO for absolute independence. In 1923, a group of governments worked in the Governing Body to reduce the ILO's budget to approximately US $1,400,000 - which became established as a standard level for the ILO.

The restriction of the budget made stabilization and consolidation of ILO programmes and activities necessary. That, in turn, had positive spillover effects. Between 1922 and 1931, the Conference continued to meet each year but adopted only 15 Conventions and 21 Recommendations. The limitation of the standard-setting work of the ILO allowed national governments to devote adequate attention to applying the provisions of the international agreements in national laws and regulations. More and more countries ratified ILO Conventions and ILO standards began to exercise an effective influence in the improvements of conditions of life and work. In 1926, an important innovation was introduced when the International Labour Conference set up a supervisory system on the application of its standards, which still exists today. It created the Committee of Experts composed of independent jurists responsible for examining government reports and presenting its own report each year to the Conference.

The stabilization of the ILO's basic programmes in no sense implied stagnation. As Director, Thomas continued to inspire his staff to take advantage of every opportunity to promote the objectives of the ILO. He was a great believer in the "policy of presence", and he spent a good deal of time travelling in order to seek support for the objectives and functions of the Organisation. He visited all the European countries, as well as countries in North and South America, China and Japan. In 1932, after having assured the ILO's strong presence in the world for 13 years, Thomas suddenly died at 53.

== Sources ==
- Pierre Renouvin (1925). Les formes du Gouvernement de Guerre. Paris: Les Presses universitaires de France.
- Edward J. Phelan (1936). Yes and Albert Thomas.

Positions in intergovernmental organisations
New creation	Director-General of the International Labour Organization; 1919-1932	Succeeded by Harold Butler
