= List of specialized agencies of the United Nations =

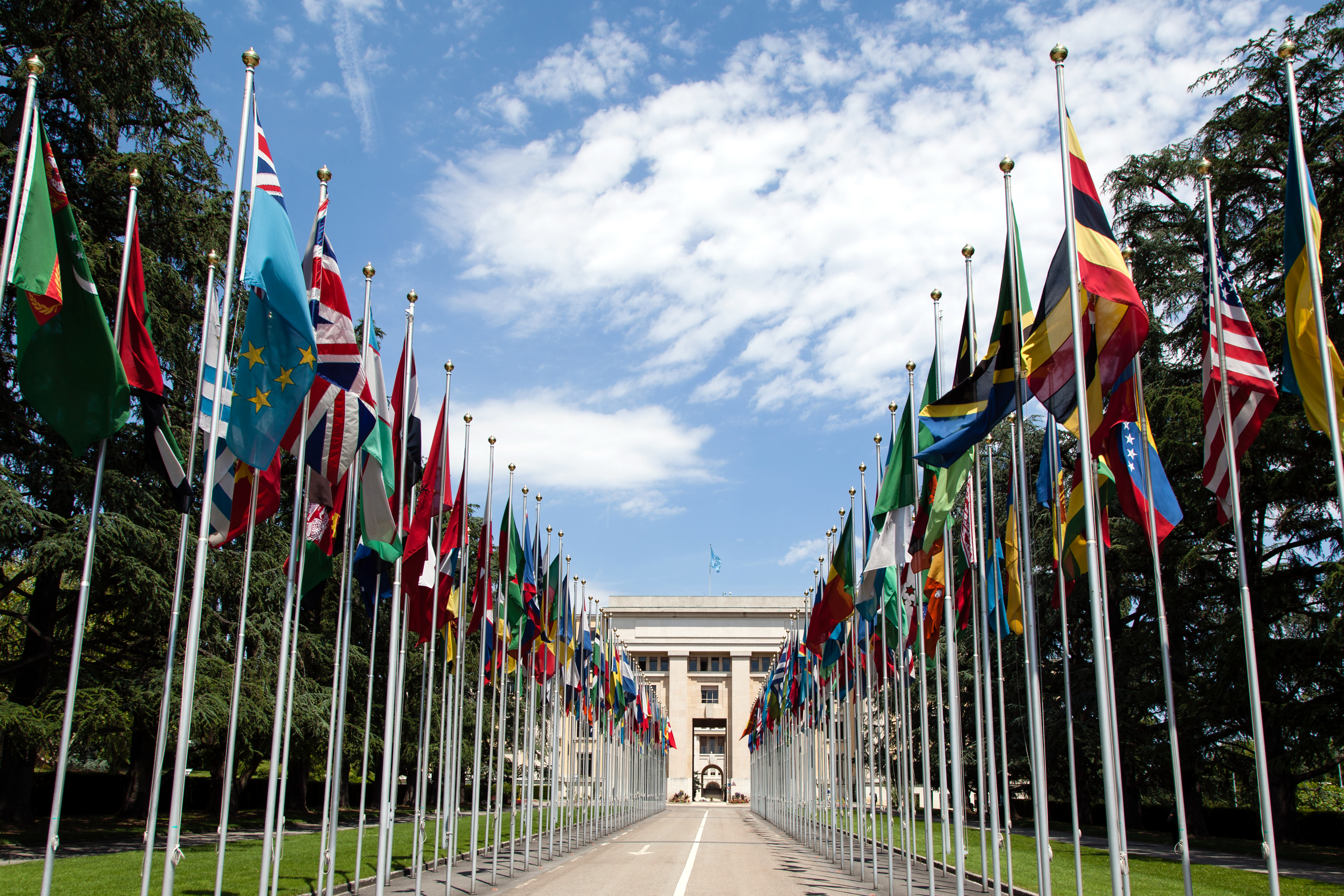
The United Nations Office at Geneva in Switzerland is the second biggest UN centre after the United Nations Headquarters in New York City.

United Nations specialized agencies are autonomous organizations working with the United Nations (UN) and each other through the structure of the United Nations Economic and Social Council at the intergovernmental level, and through the Chief Executives Board for Coordination (CEB) at the intersecretariat level.

One of the principal objectives of the UN is to solve economic, social, cultural and humanitarian issues through international cooperation. Several specialized agencies have been set up to achieve these goals, agencies which may or may not have been created by the UN, but were incorporated into the United Nations System by the United Nations Economic and Social Council acting under Articles 57 and 63 of the United Nations Charter. At present, the UN has in total 15 (Note: In some sources, the UN indicates that there are 17 specialized agencies when counting the International Bank for Reconstruction and Development (IBRD), the International Finance Corporation (IFC), and the International Development Association (IDA), all part of the World Bank Group (WBG), as individual specialized agencies. The UN's Annual Statistical Report on procurement states that 41 organizations were in operation in 2021 but that some consolidation had reduced this number to 31 in 2022.) specialized agencies that carry out various functions on behalf of the UN. The specialized agencies are listed below.

== Food and Agriculture Organization (FAO) ==
FAO logo

The Food and Agriculture Organization of the United Nations leads international efforts to defeat hunger. Serving both developed and developing countries, FAO acts as a neutral forum where all nations meet as equals to negotiate agreements and debate policy. FAO's mandate is to raise levels of nutrition, improve agricultural productivity, better the lives of rural populations and contribute to the growth of the world economy. FAO is the largest of the U.N. agencies. It was established in 1945, succeeding the International Institute of Agriculture, and its headquarters is in Rome.

== International Civil Aviation Organization (ICAO) ==
ICAO flag

The International Civil Aviation Organization (ICAO) was founded in 1947. It codifies the principles and techniques of international air navigation and fosters the planning and development of international air transport to ensure safe and orderly growth. Its headquarters are located in Montreal, Canada.

The ICAO Council adopts standards and recommended practices concerning air navigation, prevention of unlawful interference, and facilitation of border-crossing procedures for international civil aviation. In addition, ICAO defines the protocols for air accident investigation followed by transport safety authorities in countries signatory to the Convention on International Civil Aviation.

== International Fund for Agricultural Development (IFAD) ==
The International Fund for Agricultural Development (IFAD) was established as an international financial institution in 1977, as one of the major outcomes of the 1974 World Food Conference and a response to the situation in the Sahel. It is dedicated to eradicating rural poverty in developing countries. Its headquarters are in Rome, Italy.

== International Labour Organization (ILO) ==
ILO flag

The International Labour Organization (ILO) deals with labour issues. Its headquarters are in Geneva, Switzerland. Founded in 1919, it was formed through the negotiations of the Treaty of Versailles and was initially an agency of the League of Nations. It became a member of the UN system after the demise of the League and the formation of the UN at the end of World War II. Its Constitution, as amended to date, includes the Declaration of Philadelphia on the aims and purposes of the Organization. Its secretariat is known as the International Labour Office.

== International Maritime Organization (IMO) ==
IMO flag

The International Maritime Organization (IMO), formerly known as the Inter-Governmental Maritime Consultative Organization (IMCO), was established in 1948 by the United Nations to coordinate international maritime safety and related practices. However, the IMO did not enter into full force until 1958.

Headquartered in London, United Kingdom, IMO promotes cooperation between government and the shipping industry to improve maritime safety and prevent marine pollution. IMO is governed by an Assembly of members and is financially administered by a council of members elected from the assembly. The work of IMO is conducted through five committees, and these are supported by technical sub-committees. Member organizations of the U.N. organizational family may observe the proceedings of the IMO. Observer status may be granted to qualified non-governmental organizations.

The IMO is supported by a permanent secretariat of employees who are representative of its members. The secretariat is composed of a Secretary-General who is periodically elected by the Assembly, and various divisions including, inter alia, marine safety, environmental protection, and a conference section. It also promotes international cooperation in education, science and culture.

== International Monetary Fund (IMF) ==
Seal of the International Monetary Fund

The International Monetary Fund (IMF) is part of the United Nations system and has a formal relationship agreement with the U.N., but retains its independence. The IMF provides monetary cooperation and financial stability and acts as a forum for advice, negotiation and assistance on financial issues. It is headquartered in Washington, D.C.

== International Telecommunication Union (ITU) ==
The International Telecommunication Union (ITU) was established to standardize and regulate international radio and telecommunications. It was founded as the International Telegraph Union in Paris on 17 May 1865. Its main tasks include standardization, allocation of the radio spectrum, and organizing interconnection arrangements between different countries to allow international phone calls—in which regard it performs for telecommunications a similar function to what the Universal Postal Union (UPU) performs for postal services. It has its headquarters in Geneva, Switzerland, next to the U.N.'s Geneva campus.

== United Nations Educational, Scientific and Cultural Organization (UNESCO) ==
UNESCO flag

The United Nations Educational, Scientific and Cultural Organization (UNESCO) is a specialized agency of the United Nations established in 1945 with its headquarters in Paris, France. Its stated purpose is to contribute to peace and security by promoting international collaboration through education, science, and culture to propagate further universal respect for justice, the rule of law, and the human rights and fundamental freedoms proclaimed in the U.N. Charter.

== United Nations Industrial Development Organization (UNIDO) ==
The United Nations Industrial Development Organization (UNIDO) is the specialized agency of the United Nations, which promotes inclusive and sustainable industrial development (ISID), headquartered in Vienna, Austria. The organization addresses some of the most pressing issues of our time and works to accelerate economic growth to bring prosperity to all while at the same time safeguarding the environment. UNIDO's mandate is fully aligned with the global development agenda, which underlines the central role of industrialization and its importance as a key enabler for all 17 Global Goals, and especially for SDG9. The Director General is Gerd Müller.

== Universal Postal Union (UPU) ==
UPU flag

The Universal Postal Union (UPU), headquartered in Bern, Switzerland, coordinates postal policies between member nations, and hence the worldwide postal system. Each member country agrees to the same set of terms for conducting international postal duties.

== World Bank Group (WBG) ==
The World Bank Group is part of the United Nations System and has a formal relationship agreement with the U.N., but retains its independence. The WBG comprises a group of five legally separate but affiliated institutions: the International Bank for Reconstruction and Development (IBRD), the International Finance Corporation (IFC), the International Development Association (IDA), the Multilateral Investment Guarantee Agency (MIGA), and the International Centre for Settlement of Investment Disputes (ICSID). It is a vital source of financial and technical assistance to developing countries around the world. Its mission is to fight poverty with passion and professionalism for lasting results and to help people help themselves and their environment by providing resources, sharing knowledge, building capacity and forging partnerships in the public and private sectors. WBG's headquarters are in Washington, D.C.

=== International Bank for Reconstruction and Development (IBRD) ===
The International Bank for Reconstruction and Development makes loans to developing countries for development programmes with the stated goal of reducing poverty. It is part of the World Bank Group (WBG).

=== International Development Association (IDA) ===
The International Development Association's mandate is close to that of the International Bank for Reconstruction and Development, with a focus on the poorest countries. It is part of the World Bank Group (WBG).

=== International Finance Corporation (IFC) ===
The International Finance Corporation is the largest multilateral source of loan and equity financing for private sector projects in the developing world. It is part of the World Bank Group (WBG).

== World Health Organization (WHO) ==
WHO flag

The World Health Organization (WHO) acts as a coordinating authority on international public health and deals with health, sanitation, and diseases and sends medical teams to help combat epidemics. Established on 7 April 1948, when 26 members of the United Nations ratified its Constitution, the agency inherited the mandate and resources of its predecessor, the Health Organization, which had been an agency of the League of Nations. 7 April is now celebrated as World Health Day every year. The WHO is governed by 192 Member States through the World Health Assembly. It is headquartered in Geneva, Switzerland.

== World Intellectual Property Organization (WIPO) ==
The World Intellectual Property Organization (WIPO) is a specialized agency of the United Nations created in 1967 and headquartered in Geneva, Switzerland. Its purpose is to encourage creative activity and to promote the protection of intellectual property throughout the world. The organization administers several treaties concerning the protection of intellectual property rights.

== World Meteorological Organization (WMO) ==
WMO flag

The World Meteorological Organization (WMO) originated from the International Meteorological Organization (IMO), which was founded in 1873. Established in 1950, WMO became the specialized agency of the United Nations for modern meteorology (weather and climate), operational hydrology and related geophysical sciences. It has its headquarters in Geneva, Switzerland.

== UN Tourism ==
The UN Tourism (formerly United Nations World Tourism Organization, UNWTO) was established in 1974 in Madrid, Spain, to replace the International Union of Official Tourist Publicity Organizations (IUOTPO). UNWTO has 160 member states and 350 affiliated members representing private organizations, educational institutions, and others. It is headquartered in Madrid, Spain. The World Tourism Organization serves as a forum for tourism policies and acts as a practical source for tourism know-how. In 2023, UNWTO decide to rename this organization to UN Tourism.

== Former specialized agencies ==
The only U.N. specialized agency to go out of existence is the International Refugee Organization (IRO), which existed from 1946 to 1952. In 1952, it was replaced by the Office of the United Nations High Commissioner for Refugees (UNHCR), which is a subsidiary organ of the United Nations General Assembly (UNGA).

== Related organizations ==
There are other intergovernmental organizations that have concluded cooperation agreements with the United Nations. In terms of cooperation structures, some agreements come very close to the relationship agreements concluded under articles 57 and 63 of the U.N. Charter with the specialized agencies, but due to Charter requirements that the agencies deal with "economic, social, cultural, educational, health, and related fields", organizations with such agreements are not formally specialized agencies of the United Nations. These organizations are termed Related Organizations by the UN.

The International Atomic Energy Agency (IAEA) established such an agreement with the UN in 1957. The Organisation for the Prohibition of Chemical Weapons (OPCW) and the Comprehensive Nuclear-Test-Ban Treaty Organization (CTBTO) also used this model for agreements of their own with the UN.

=== Comprehensive Nuclear-Test-Ban Treaty Organization (CTBTO) Preparatory Commission ===
The Comprehensive Nuclear-Test-Ban Treaty Organization Preparatory Commission is tasked with preparing the activities of the nuclear non-proliferation organization.

=== International Atomic Energy Agency (IAEA) ===
IAEA flag

The International Atomic Energy Agency (IAEA) is an intergovernmental organization for scientific and technical cooperation in the field of nuclear technology. It is headquartered in Vienna, Austria. It seeks to promote the peaceful use of nuclear energy and to inhibit its use for military purposes. The IAEA was set up as an autonomous organization on 29 July 1957. Before this, in 1953, U.S. President Dwight D. Eisenhower envisioned the creation of this international body to control and develop the use of atomic energy, in his "Atoms for Peace" speech before the U.N. General Assembly. The organization and its former Director-General, Mohamed ElBaradei, were jointly awarded the Nobel Peace Prize announced on 7 October 2005. As of March 2015, the IAEA's membership is 164 countries.

Due to historical reasons and the political nature of its work, the IAEA is not a specialized agency. Instead, its relationship with the United Nations is governed by a special agreement as well as by its statute that commits the IAEA to report annually to the General Assembly and, when appropriate, to the Security Council.

=== International Organization for Migration (IOM) ===
Since September 2016, the International Organization for Migration has been a related organization to the United Nations with its headquarters in Geneva, Switzerland. The International Organization for Migration (IOM) is an intergovernmental organization that provides services and advice concerning migration to governments and migrants, including internally displaced persons, refugees, and migrant workers.

=== Organization for the Prohibition of Chemical Weapons (OPCW) ===
The Organisation for the Prohibition of Chemical Weapons (OPCW) is an intergovernmental organization, located in The Hague, Netherlands. The organization promotes and verifies the adherence to the Chemical Weapons Convention which prohibits the use of chemical weapons and requires their destruction. The verification consists of both evaluations of declarations by member states and on-site inspections.

=== World Trade Organization (WTO) ===
The World Trade Organization was established instead of the failed proposal for a specialized agency dealing with trade issues, the International Trade Organization. WTO headquarters are in Geneva, Switzerland.

== Summary ==
No.	Logo	Official name	Abbreviation	Location (Country)	Location (City)	Established	Precursor established	Member states	Other participants	Map and reference
–		United Nations	UN	United States	New York City	1945	1920	the UN members	observer states: Holy See, Palestine; observer entities: Order of Malta; observer regional organizations: European Union; other observer entities and organizations	UN
Specialized agencies
1		Food and Agriculture Organization	FAO	Italy	Rome	1945	—	the UN members except Liechtenstein; Cook Islands, Niue	associate members: Faroe Islands, Tokelau; member organization: European Union	FAO
2		International Civil Aviation Organization	ICAO	Canada	Montreal	1947	—	the UN members except Liechtenstein; Cook Islands	—	ICAO
3		International Fund for Agricultural Development	IFAD	Italy	Rome	1977	—	the UN members except Andorra, Australia, Bahrain, Belarus, Brunei, Bulgaria, Czech Republic, Latvia, Liechtenstein, Monaco, San Marino, Singapore, Slovenia, Slovakia, Turkmenistan; Cook Islands, Niue	observers: Holy See	IFAD
4		International Labour Organization	ILO	Switzerland	Geneva	1919	—	the UN members except Andorra, Bhutan, Liechtenstein, Micronesia, Monaco, Nauru, North Korea; Cook Islands	observer states: Palestine	ILO
5		International Maritime Organization	IMO	United Kingdom	London	1959	—	the UN members except Afghanistan, Andorra, Bhutan, Burkina Faso, Burundi, Central African Republic, Chad, Eswatini, Laos, Lesotho, Liechtenstein, Mali, Micronesia, Niger, Rwanda, South Sudan, Tajikistan, Uzbekistan; Cook Islands	associate members: Faroe Islands, Hong Kong, Macao	IMO
6		International Monetary Fund	IMF	United States	Washington, D.C.	1945	—	the UN members except Cuba, Monaco, and North Korea; Kosovo	—	IMF
7		International Telecommunication Union	ITU	Switzerland	Geneva	1865	—	the UN members; Vatican City	observers: Palestine	ITU
8		United Nations Educational, Scientific and Cultural Organization	UNESCO	France	Paris	1946	1922	the UN members except Israel, Liechtenstein; Cook Islands, Niue, Palestine	associate members: Anguilla, Aruba, British Virgin Islands, Cayman Islands, Curaçao, Faroe Islands, Macau, Montserrat, New Caledonia, Sint Maarten, Tokelau; observers: Holy See; NOC only: Liechtenstein, Hong Kong, Bermuda, Guam, American Samoa, Puerto Rico, US Virgin Islands	UNESCO
9		United Nations Industrial Development Organization	UNIDO	Austria	Vienna	1985	1966	the UN members except Andorra, Australia, Belgium, Brunei, Canada, Denmark, Estonia, France, Greece, Iceland, Latvia, Liechtenstein, Lithuania, Nauru, New Zealand, Portugal, San Marino, Singapore, Slovakia, United Kingdom, United States; Palestine	observers: Holy See, Order of Malta	UNIDO
10		Universal Postal Union	UPU	Switzerland	Bern	1874	—	the UN members except Andorra, Marshall Islands, Micronesia, Palau; Vatican City; Aruba, Curaçao and Sint Maarten (as single member); British Overseas Territories (as single member)	observers: Palestine	UPU
11		World Bank Group	WBG	United States	Washington, D.C.	1945	—	the UN members except Andorra, Cuba, Liechtenstein, Monaco, North Korea; Kosovo	—	WBG
12		World Health Organization	WHO	Switzerland	Geneva	1948	1907	the UN members except Argentina, Liechtenstein, United States; Cook Islands, Niue	associate members: Puerto Rico, Tokelau; observers: Chinese Taipei (2009–2016), Holy See, Palestine, Order of Malta	WHO
13		World Intellectual Property Organization	WIPO	Switzerland	Geneva	1967	—	the UN members except Micronesia, Palau, South Sudan; Cook Islands, Holy See, Niue	observers: Palestine, several intergovernmental and non-governmental organizations	WIPO
14		World Meteorological Organization	WMO	Switzerland	Geneva	1950	1873	the UN members except Equatorial Guinea, Grenada, Liechtenstein, Marshall Islands, Palau, Saint Kitts and Nevis, Saint Vincent and the Grenadines, and San Marino; Cook Islands, Niue	member territories: British Caribbean Territories, Curaçao and Sint Maartin, French Polynesia, Hong Kong, Macau, New Caledonia	WMO
15		UN Tourism		Spain	Madrid	1974	1925	the UN members except Australia, Belgium, Belize, Canada, Denmark, Dominica, Estonia, Finland, Grenada, Guyana, Iceland, Ireland, Kiribati, Latvia, Liechtenstein, Luxembourg, Marshall Islands, Micronesia, Nauru, New Zealand, Norway, Russia, Saint Kitts and Nevis, Saint Lucia, Saint Vincent and the Grenadines, Singapore, Solomon Islands, Somalia, South Sudan, Suriname, Sweden, Tonga, Tuvalu, United Kingdom, United States	associate members: Aruba, Flemish Community, Hong Kong, Macau, Madeira, Puerto Rico; observers: Holy See, Palestine	UNWTO
Related organizations
16	Preparatory Commission for the Comprehensive Nuclear-Test-Ban Treaty Organization Logo	Preparatory Commission for the Comprehensive Nuclear-Test-Ban Treaty Organization	CTBTO Prep Com	Austria	Vienna	1996	—	the UN members except Bhutan, India, Mauritius, North Korea, Pakistan, Saudi Arabia, South Sudan, Syria, Tonga, Yemen; Cook Islands, Holy See, Niue	—	CTBTO
17		International Atomic Energy Agency	IAEA	Austria	Vienna	1957	—	the UN members except Andorra, Bhutan, Equatorial Guinea, Guinea-Bissau, Kiribati, Maldives, Micronesia, Nauru, North Korea, São Tomé and Príncipe, Solomon Islands, South Sudan, Suriname, Timor-Leste, Tuvalu; Holy See	observer: Palestine	IAEA
18		Organisation for the Prohibition of Chemical Weapons	OPCW	Netherlands	The Hague	1997	—	the UN members except Egypt, Israel, North Korea and South Sudan; Cook Islands, Holy See, Niue, Palestine	—	OPCW
19	World Trade Organization (logo and wordmark)	World Trade Organization	WTO	Switzerland	Geneva	1995	1948	the UN members except Algeria, Andorra, Azerbaijan, Bahamas, Belarus, Bhutan, Bosnia and Herzegovina, Equatorial Guinea, Eritrea, Ethiopia, Iran, Iraq, Kiribati, Lebanon, Libya, Marshall Islands, Micronesia, Monaco, Nauru, North Korea, Palau, San Marino, São Tomé and Príncipe, Serbia, Somalia, South Sudan, Sudan, Syria, Tuvalu, Uzbekistan; customs territory members: European Union, Hong Kong, Macau, Chinese Taipei	observers: Algeria, Andorra, Azerbaijan, Bahamas, Belarus, Bhutan, Bosnia and Herzegovina, Equatorial Guinea, Ethiopia, Iran, Iraq, Lebanon, Libya, São Tomé and Príncipe, Serbia, Somalia, South Sudan, Sudan, Syria, Uzbekistan, Turkmenistan, Holy See	WTO
20		International Organization for Migration	IOM	Switzerland	Geneva	1951	—	the UN members except Andorra, Bahrain, Bhutan, Brunei, Equatorial Guinea, Indonesia, Iraq, Kuwait, Lebanon, Liechtenstein, Malaysia, Monaco, North Korea, Oman, Qatar, San Marino, Saudi Arabia, Singapore, Syria, United Arab Emirates; Cook Islands, Holy See	observers: Bahrain, Bhutan, Indonesia, Kuwait, Malaysia, Qatar, San Marino, Saudi Arabia; over 80 global and regional IGOs and NGOs are also observers	IOM
