= Edward J. Phelan =

Irish civil servant

Edward Joseph Phelan (25 July 1888 – 15 September 1967), frequently E. J. Phelan, was the first appointed international civil servant and fourth Director-General of the International Labour Office, serving from 1941 to 1948, during most of which time the ILO was temporarily relocated to Montréal from Geneva. Phelan was the principal author of the Declaration of Philadelphia.

== Early years ==
Edward Phelan was born in Tramore, County Waterford, on the south coast of Ireland. His father, Thomas, who came from nearby Cheekpoint was a ship's captain, as was his grandfather. When he was seven years of age his father was employed on the transatlantic liner route and the family moved to Liverpool in England. He retained a strong sense of his Irish identity, and returned every year for holidays. In Liverpool he attended St. Francis Xavier's College and at University College Liverpool where he studied mathematics. He received an Honours degree in Physics, to which he added a B.A. in anticipation of joining the British Civil Service. His first posting was to the Board of Trade where he investigated social issues such as cost of living, rent and housing conditions in England and Scotland. Phelan wanted to see the world, so he resigned his secure job and began to work for George Lunn Tours Ltd. a tourist agency with headquarters at Lugano, Switzerland, near the Italian border.

== Civil service ==
Phelan was contacted by the Board of Trade to participate in an enquiry into housing conditions in South Wales. Although he was very much enjoying his new job and the opportunities it afforded him to travel, he returned to London to resume duties at the Civil Service. The outbreak of the First World War ensured the suspension of the enquiry and he was instead assigned to the newly established Ministry of Labour at Montagu House, Whitehall. Phelan accompanied Bruce Lockhart as the first British delegation to meet the Bolsheviks in Moscow in January 1918, just as the Finnish Civil War commenced and coincidental with the Brest-Litovsk negotiations. At the beginning of March Phelan returned to England and his work at the Ministry of Labour where he headed a think-tank dealing with 'foreign questions'. In the Autumn of 1918 he suggested that the Ministry should formulate a policy position for the anticipated peace treaties. Phelan referred to this decision as the conception of the ILO. Lloyd George approved the initiative and Phelan became secretary to George Barnes of the British peace delegation.

== International Labour Office ==
A few months after the signing of the Versailles treaty and prior to its ratification, Phelan and Harold Butler organised the inaugural meeting of the ILO in Washington. As Director-General, he was preceded by John Gilbert Winant and succeeded by David A. Morse.

== Sources ==
- van Hoek, Kees : Vignette: Edward Phelan : Irish Times : 3 Jan. 1950 p5
- R H Bruce Lockhart : Memoirs of a British Agent ISBN 978-1-4437-8151-0
- Phelan, Edward Joseph Yes and Albert Thomas : 1936
- Unemployment as a world-problem By John Maynard Keynes, Karl Přibram, Edward Joseph Phelan, Quincy Wright (ed.). 'Lectures on the Harris Foundation, 1931', pub. 1970.
- ILO Edward Phelan and the ILO: Life and views of an international social actor 2009 ISBN 978-92-2-121983-5
- Executive Summary of book - Edward Phelan and the ILO pp4

Positions in intergovernmental organisations
Preceded by John Gilbert Winant	Director-General of the International Labour Organization; 1941-1948	Succeeded by David A. Morse
