= Harold Butler (civil servant) =

British civil servant (1883–1951)

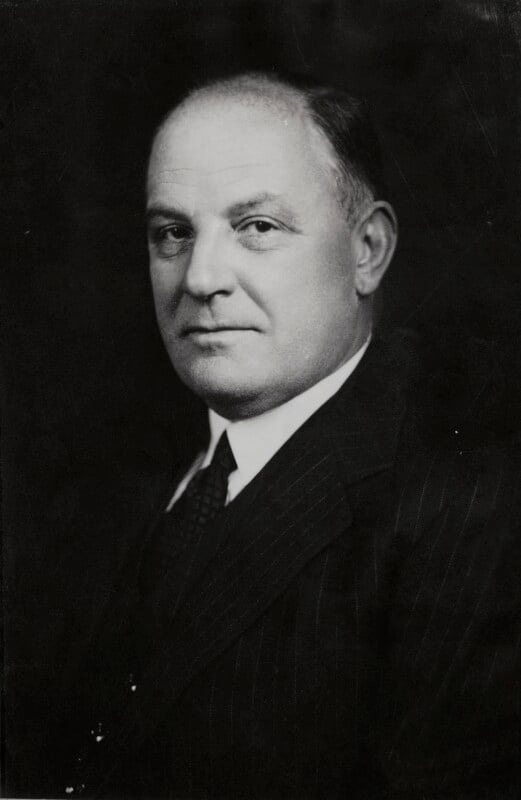
Butler in 1947

Sir Harold Beresford Butler, KCMG, CB (6 October 1883 – 26 March 1951) was a British civil servant and the first Warden of Nuffield College, Oxford.

== Biography ==
Butler was educated at Eton College and Balliol College, Oxford, where he obtained a First in literae humaniores. He was elected a Fellow of All Souls College, Oxford in 1905. He joined the Home Civil Service in 1907. Initially joining the Local Government Board, he transferred to the Home Office in 1908. In 1916 he was transferred to the newly created Ministry of Labour at the insistence of William Bridgeman.

He was the Secretary-General of the first International Labour Conference, held in Washington, D.C. in 1919. He failed to be elected as Director-General of the International Labour Office established at the Conference because another Briton, Sir Eric Drummond, headed the League of Nations at the same time. Instead, he was elected Deputy Director of the ILO. In 1932, he was elected Director-General of the International Labour Office, a post he would hold until 1938, when he was forced to resign under French pressure. As Director-General, he was preceded by Albert Thomas and succeeded by John Gilbert Winant.

Butler became the first Warden of the newly created Nuffield College, Oxford in 1938. During World War II, he served as the southern regional commissioner for civil defence. He then became the head of the British Information Service at the British Embassy in Washington in 1942, resigning as Warden of Nuffield the following year.

Butler was appointed CB in 1919 and KCMG in 1946.

He was the father of the civil servant and historian Rohan Butler.

Positions in intergovernmental organisations
Preceded by Albert Thomas	Director-General of the International Labour Organization; 1932-1938	Succeeded by John G. Winant
