= Declaration of Philadelphia =

1944 International Labour declaration

- Declaration concerning the aims and purposes of the International Labour Organisation, adopted at the 26th session of the ILO, Philadelphia, 10 May 1944

The Declaration of Philadelphia (10 May 1944) restated the traditional objectives of the International Labour Organization (ILO) and then branched out in two new directions: the centrality of human rights to social policy, and the need for international economic planning. With the end of the world war in sight, it sought to adapt the guiding principles of the ILO "to the new realities and to the new aspirations aroused by the hopes for a better world." It was adopted at the 26th Conference of the ILO in Philadelphia, United States of America. In 1946, when the ILO's constitution was being revised by the General Conference convened in Montreal, the Declaration of Philadelphia was annexed to the constitution and forms an integral part of it by Article 1.

The declaration, in full, the Declaration concerning the aims and purposes of the International Labour Organisation, adopted at the 26th session of the ILO, Philadelphia, 10 May 1944 was drafted by the then acting ILO Director, Edward J. Phelan, and C. Wilfred Jenks. Most of the demands of the declaration were a result of a partnership of American and Western European labor unions and the ILO secretariat.

== Broad and general terms ==
The declaration begins with general aims and purposes for the ILO and then enumerates specific reforms which, unlike those in the original ILO constitution, are expressed in broader terms to address both immediate and future needs and aspirations and to avoid any provision from becoming spent.

== Outline ==
The declaration focused on a series of key principles to embody the work of the ILO. These include:

- Labour is not a commodity. (I, a)
- Freedom of expression and of association are essential to sustained progress.
- Poverty anywhere constitutes a danger to prosperity everywhere. (I, c)
- the war against want requires ... unrelenting vigour ... (for) the promotion of the common welfare. (I, d)
- All human beings, irrespective of race, creed or sex, have the right to pursue both their material well-being and their spiritual development in conditions of freedom and dignity, of economic security and equal opportunity. (II, a)

To achieve these fundamental goals "effective international and national action" is necessary (IV).

The declaration does not envision its universal principles giving rise to uniform labour standards but expressly states that they "must be determined with due regard to the stage of social and economic development reached by each people," but that "their progressive application to peoples who are still dependent, as well as those who have already achieved self-government, is a matter of concern to the whole civilized world" (V).

== Assessment ==
The ILO, as with most of the League of Nations system, hibernated in the late 1930s. The Declaration of Philadelphia brought it back to life.

The Declaration of Philadelphia envisioned the ILO as the master agency among the specialized international bodies, placing the ILO "on the same plane as the UN as the economic counterpart of that world political body." Instead, the role it saw for the ILO was taken by the United Nations Economic and Social Council.

The declaration's emphasis on human rights was to bear more fruit: the ILO promulgated a series of Conventions and Recommendations dealing with labour inspection, freedom of association, the right to organise and collectively bargain, equal pay, against forced labor and discrimination.
