= International Refugee Organization =

Intergovernmental humanitarian organisation (1946–1952)

- Abbreviation: IRO
- Predecessor: United Nations Relief and Rehabilitation Administration
- Successor: United Nations High Commissioner for Refugees
- Formation: 20 April 1946; 80 years ago
- Type: UN specialised agency
- Legal status: Inactive
- Parent organisation: United Nations

The International Refugee Organization (IRO) was an intergovernmental organisation founded on 20 April 1946 to deal with the massive refugee problem created by World War II. A Preparatory Commission began operations fourteen months previously. In 1948, the treaty establishing the IRO formally entered into force and the IRO became a United Nations specialised agency. The IRO assumed most of the functions of the earlier United Nations Relief and Rehabilitation Administration. In 1952, operations of the IRO ceased, and it was replaced by the Office of the United Nations High Commissioner for Refugees (UNHCR).

The Constitution of the International Refugee Organization, adopted by the United Nations General Assembly on 15 December 1946, is the founding document of the IRO. The constitution specified the organisation’s field of operations. Controversially, the constitution defined "persons of German ethnic origin" who had been expelled, or were to be expelled from their countries of birth into the postwar Germany, as individuals who would "not be the concern of the Organization." This excluded from its purview a group that exceeded in number all the other European displaced persons put together. Also, because of disagreements between the Western allies and the Soviet Union, the IRO only worked in areas controlled by Western armies of occupation.

Twenty-six states became members of the IRO and it formally came into existence in 1948: Argentina, Australia, Belgium, Bolivia, Brazil, Canada, Republic of China, Chile, Denmark, the Dominican Republic, France, Guatemala, Honduras, Iceland, Italy, Liberia, Luxembourg, the Netherlands, New Zealand, Norway, Panama, Peru, the Philippines, Switzerland, the United Kingdom, the United States, and Venezuela. The U.S. provided about 40% of the IRO's $155 million annual budget. The total contribution by the members for the five years of operation was around $400 million. It had rehabilitated around 10 million people during this time, out of 15 million people who were stranded in Europe. The IRO's first Director-General was William Hallam Tuck, succeeded by J. Donald Kingsley on 31 July 1949.

IRO closed its operations on 31 January 1952 and after a liquidation period, went out of existence on 30 September 1953. By that time many of its responsibilities had been assumed by other agencies. Of particular importance was the Office of the High Commissioner for Refugees, established in January 1951 as a part of the United Nations, and the Intergovernmental Committee for European Migration (originally PICMME), set up in December 1951.

== Filmography ==
- The Search by Fred Zinnemann (1948): The IRO helped the producers to make this story about children refugees, in 1945 Germany.

== See also ==
- First session of the United Nations General Assembly
