= David A. Morse =

American lawyer

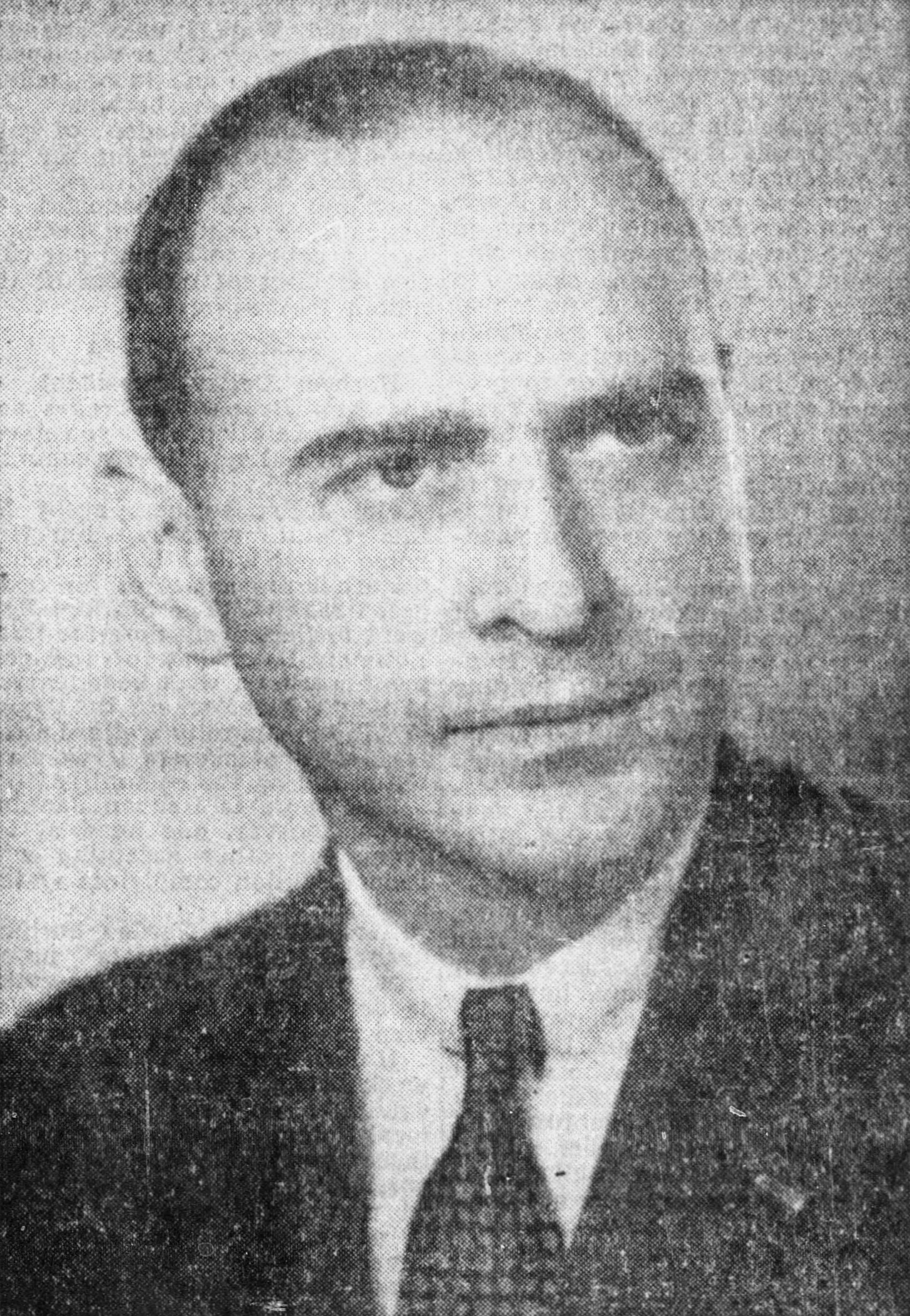
- Morse c. 1947

Director-General of the International Labour Organization
- In office June 1948 – February 1970
- Preceded by: Edward J. Phelan
- Succeeded by: C. Wilfred Jenks

United States Deputy Secretary of Labor
- In office 1947–1948
- President: Harry S. Truman
- Preceded by: Keen Johnson
- Succeeded by: Michael J. Galvin

Personal details
- Born: David Abner Moscovitz; May 31, 1907 New York, U.S.
- Died: December 1, 1990 (aged 83) New York, U.S.
- Spouse: Mildred Edna Hockstader (m. 1937)
- Awards: Legion of Merit

Military service
- Allegiance: United States
- Branch/service: United States Army
- Years of service: 1943–1945
- Rank: Lieutenant colonel
- Battles/wars: World War II; North African campaign; Italian campaign; Allied invasion of Sicily; Allied invasion of Italy

David Abner Morse, né David Abner Moscovitz (31 May 1907 – 1 December 1990) was an American bureaucrat who headed the International Labour Organization.

== Background ==
Born David Abner Moscovitz in New York on May 31, 1907, Morse graduated from Rutgers University in 1929, where he was a member of the Cap and Skull Society, and from the Harvard Law School in 1932. He was admitted to the New Jersey bar in 1932. In 1937 Moscovitz changed his surname to Morse, "motivated by instances of anti-Semitic resentment he had experience[d] in both his private and professional life." Morse married Mildred Edna Hockstader on May 13, 1937.

== Career ==
Morse later became Special Assistant to the United States Attorney General, Chief Counsel of the Petroleum Labour Policy Board in the US Department of the Interior 1933-1935, and Regional Attorney for the National Labour Relations Board in the metropolitan area of New York (1936-1937).

When war broke out, he gave up his law practice to join the army. From June 1943 to April 1944, Morse served as Captain in North Africa, Sicily and Italy, where he was appointed Chief of the Labor Division of the Allied Military Government (1945). He drafted and put into effect the labour policy and programme in Sicily and Italy for the British and United States Governments and armies. As Chief of the Labor Section of the US Group Control Council for Germany under Generals Eisenhower and Clay, he prepared the labor policy and program for Germany. Promoted to Lieutenant-Colonel, he was awarded the Legion of Merit for his army services in 1946.

After his discharge from the Army in 1945, Morse was appointed general counsel of the National Labor Relations Board. On July 1, 1946, President Truman named him Assistant Secretary of Labor, and Morse devoted his activities to the creation of the Department's programme of international affairs; he served as Acting Secretary from June 9 to August 2, 1948.

Morse had been a delegate to the International Labour Organization (ILO) on two occasions and served as the United States Government representative on the Governing Body. In June 1948, he was named chief of the United States delegation to the International Labour Conference. At the 105th session of the Governing Body in San Francisco in June 1948, he was unanimously elected director-general for a ten-year term. He was unanimously re-elected for five-year terms in May 1957, in March 1962, and in February 1967. In 1969 the ILO was awarded the Nobel Prize for Peace. He resigned in February 1970. As Director-General, he was preceded by Edward J. Phelan and succeeded by C. Wilfred Jenks.

== Death ==
David Abner Morse died in New York on December 1, 1990.

Government offices
| Preceded by Keen Johnson | United States Under Secretary of Labor; 1947–1948 | Succeeded by Michael J. Galvin |
Positions in intergovernmental organisations
| Preceded by Edward J. Phelan | Director-General of the International Labour Organization; 1948-1970 | Succeeded by C. Wilfred Jenks |
