= International Social Security Association =

Association of national welfare agencies

- Formation: 1927; 99 years ago
- Headquarters: Geneva, Switzerland
- President: Dr Mohammed Azman
- Website: https://www.issa.int

The International Social Security Association (ISSA) is an international organization bringing together national social security administrations and agencies. Founded in 1927, the ISSA has more than 340 member organizations in 165 countries. It has its headquarters in Geneva, Switzerland, in the International Labour Office (ILO).

== Social security ==
The recognition of social security as a basic human right is enshrined in the Universal Declaration of Human Rights (1948). The development of social security programmes is considered to be one of the most significant social achievements of the international community, but its enhancement and extension remain one of the main challenges of the 21st century.

As per the ISSA Constitution, the term "social security" means any scheme or programme established by legislation, or any other mandatory arrangement, which provides protection, whether in cash or in kind, in the event of employment accidents, occupational diseases, unemployment, maternity, sickness, invalidity, old age, retirement, survivorship, or death, and encompasses, among others, benefits for children and other family members, health care benefits, prevention, rehabilitation, and long-term care. It can include social insurance, social assistance, mutual benefit schemes, provident funds, and other arrangements which, in accordance with national law or practice, form part of a country's social security system.

At the World Social Security Forum held in 2016 in Panama the then ISSA Secretary General Hans-Horst Konkolewsky underscored that global trends, including demographic changes and the impact of the digital economy are transforming the context in which social security operates. While there is an unprecedented global political commitment to provide all people with access to social protection, and recognition that social security is a social and economic investment, the future sustainability and extension of social security will require significant innovation.

== Aims ==
The constitutional mandate of the ISSA is "to co-operate, at the international level, in the promotion and development of social security throughout the world (...) in order to advance the social and economic conditions of the population on the basis of social justice."

The ISSA's aim is to promote Dynamic Social Security as the social dimension in a globalizing world through supporting excellence in social security administration. The ISSA promotes excellence in social security administration through professional guidelines, expert knowledge, services and support to enable its members to develop dynamic social security systems and policy throughout the world.

To face the evolving needs of the world's population, the ISSA advocates that social security must increasingly adapt and innovate to foster integrated, coherent, proactive, and forward-looking social security policies with the aim of better ensuring universal access to social security.

== History ==
Founded under the auspices of the International Labour Organization (ILO) on 4 October 1927 in Brussels (Belgium), as the International Conference of Sickness Insurance Funds and Mutual Benefit Societies - Conférence internationale des unions nationales de sociétés mutuelles et de caisses d'assurance-maladie. The name was changed in 1936, in Prague (Czechoslovakia), to the International Social Insurance Conference - Conférence internationale de la mutualité et des assurances sociales (CIMAS). The present name was adopted in 1947, in Geneva (Switzerland), together with a new Constitution.

The ISSA is accorded General Category consultative status by the United Nations Economic and Social Council (ECOSOC). This accreditation by the United Nations has been given in recognition of the fact that the ISSA's work conforms to the spirit, charter and principles of the United Nations. The privileges that come with this title affords to the ISSA the right to attend, and contribute in a substantive manner to, UN General Assembly special sessions, as well as international conferences called by the UN and other intergovernmental bodies.

In the space of nine decades, the ISSA has expanded into a worldwide Association, now bringing together more than 340 organizations in 165 countries.

== Activities ==
The ISSA organizes a World Social Security Forum and General Assembly at the end of each triennium (the most recent was held in Brussels, Belgium, in October 2019) and during each triennium organizes four Regional Social Security Forums (in Africa, the Americas, Asia/Pacific and Europe); convenes topic-related technical seminars in various regions; hosts international conferences - on information and communication technology in social security; social security actuaries and statisticians; and international policy research; and is the co-organizer of the World Congress on Occupational Safety and Health every three years. The ISSA publishes professional Guidelines for key areas of social security administration, collects and disseminates information on social security programmes throughout the world; undertakes research and policy analysis on the social security issues and distributes their results; encourages mutual assistance between member organizations; facilitates good practice collection and exchange; cooperates with other international or regional organizations exercising activities related to the field; communicates with its constituency and media and promotes social security through advocacy and information; and forges partnerships between the ISSA and other international organizations active in the area of social security to advance common strategies, including the International Labour Organization, the Organisation for Economic Co-operation and Development (OECD) and the World Bank.

In 2013 the ISSA launched its Centre for Excellence in Social Security Administration, which consists of an innovative package of services to facilitate and support administrative improvements by member organizations. The ISSA Centre for Excellence provides services and support to social security administrations committed to good governance, high performance and service quality. The Centre builds on a series of internationally recognized professional Guidelines for core areas of social security administration.

In 2012 the ISSA formalized an agreement with the International Labour Organization aimed at reinforcing collaboration in support of the extension and promotion of social security. The historic agreement recognizes the key contribution of social security institutions to the extension of coverage. The Memorandum marked a new chapter in the long-standing strategic partnership between the organizations and reinforced efforts to extend social security worldwide.

Social Security Programs Throughout the World is the product of a cooperative effort between ISSA member the US Social Security Administration (SSA) and the International Social Security Association (ISSA). Social Security Programs Throughout the World highlights the principal features of social security programs in more than 170 countries. One of four regional volumes is issued every six months.

== Priorities ==
The three topical priority areas in the current ISSA programme are:

- Administrative and operational efficiency and effectiveness
- Extension of social security coverage
- Dynamic Social Security: A key condition for inclusive societies and economic growth

== Publications ==
The ISSA publishes a quarterly journal in the social security field, the International Social Security Review in English, in collaboration with Wiley-Blackwell Publishing. The ISSA's periodic series Developments and Trends and Social Policy Highlight disseminate new findings on social security policy and practice internationally. It co-publishes the series Social Security Programs Throughout the World, in co-operation with the United States Social Security Administration In partnership with the OECD and the International Organisation of Pension Supervisors (IOPS), the ISSA produces Complementary and Private Pensions Throughout the World. The ISSA also issues an electronic newsletter; social security policy briefs; analytical reports on specific topics; and a range of thematic technical reports. The ISSA provides comprehensive data on various aspects of social security including: an overview of social security systems worldwide; a monitor of social security reforms; summaries of complementary and private pension systems; social security legislation; a comprehensive bibliography; and a thesaurus of social security terminology. Databases are available via the ISSA Web portal.

== Governance structure ==
The main statutory bodies of the ISSA are the General Assembly (meets every 3 years) that consists of delegates appointed by member organizations; the Council (normally meets at each session of the General Assembly) that comprises one titular delegate or one substitute delegate from each country where there is at least one affiliate member organization; the Bureau (meets twice annually) that comprises the President, Treasurer, Secretary General and elected representatives of the 4 geographical regions.

== Membership ==
The ISSA's affiliate membership includes government departments, institutions, agencies and other entities and (non-international) federations of these. Associate membership includes (non-international) organizations with objectives compatible with those of ISSA but not qualified to become affiliate members.

== See also ==
- Seoul Declaration on Safety and Health at Work
- Social Protection
