= International Labour Organization =

Specialized agency of the United Nations

- Abbreviation: ILO
- Formation: 11 April 1919; 107 years ago
- Type: United Nations specialized agency
- Legal status: Active
- Headquarters: Geneva, Switzerland
- Official languages: English; Spanish; French
- Director-general: Gilbert Houngbo
- Parent organization: United Nations General Assembly; United Nations Economic and Social Council
- Staff: 3,491 (2025)
- Award: Nobel Peace Prize (1969)
- Website: www.ilo.org

The International Labour Organization (ILO) is a United Nations (UN) agency whose mandate is to advance social and economic justice by setting international labour standards. Founded in October 1919 under the League of Nations, it is one of the first and oldest specialized agencies of the UN. The ILO has 187 member states: 186 out of 193 UN member states plus the Cook Islands. It is headquartered in Geneva, Switzerland, with around 40 field offices around the world, and employs some 3,381 staff across 107 nations, of whom 1,698 work in technical cooperation programmes and projects.

The ILO's standards are aimed at ensuring accessible, productive, and sustainable work worldwide in conditions of freedom, equity, security and dignity. They are set forth in 193 conventions and treaties (as of 2026), of which eight are classified as fundamental according to the 1998 Declaration on Fundamental Principles and Rights at Work; together they protect freedom of association and the effective recognition of the right to collective bargaining, the elimination of forced or compulsory labour, the abolition of child labour, and the elimination of discrimination in respect of employment and occupation. The ILO is a major contributor to international labour law.

Within the UN system, the organization has a unique tripartite structure: all standards, policies, and programmes require discussion and approval from the representatives of governments, employers, and workers. This framework is maintained in the ILO's three main bodies: The International Labour Conference, which meets annually to formulate international labour standards; the Governing Body, which serves as the executive council and decides the agency's policy and budget; and the International Labour Office, the permanent secretariat that administers the organization and implements activities. The secretariat is led by the director-general, Gilbert Houngbo of Togo, who was elected by the Governing Body in 2022.

In 2019, the organization convened the Global Commission on the Future of Work, whose report made ten recommendations for governments to meet the challenges of the 21st century labour environment; these include a universal labour guarantee, social protection from birth to old age and an entitlement to lifelong learning. With its focus on international development, it is a member of the United Nations Development Group, a coalition of UN organizations aimed at helping meet the Sustainable Development Goals.

Two milestones in the history of the ILO were the Treaty of Versailles in 1919, establishing the International Labour Organization, Article 427. And secondly, the Declaration of Philadelphia in 1944, reestablishing the ILO under the UN and reaffirming the first principle that "labour is not a commodity".

== Structure ==
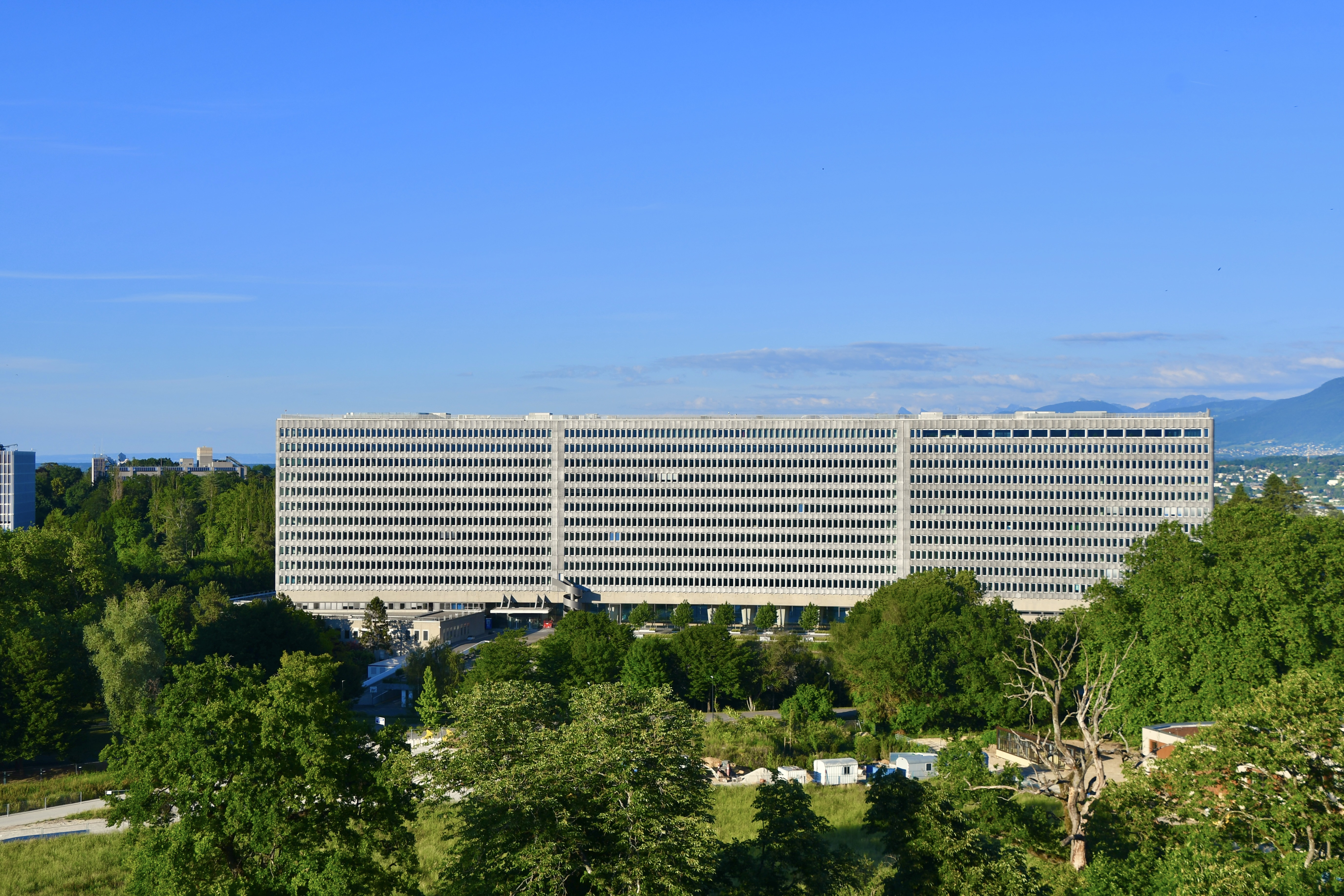
ILO headquarters in Geneva, Switzerland

The ILO is a specialized agency of the United Nations (UN). As with other UN specialized agencies (or programmes) working on international development, the ILO is also a member of the United Nations Development Group.

Unlike other United Nations specialized agencies, the International Labour Organization (ILO) has a tripartite governing structure that brings together governments, employers, and worker representatives of 187 member states, to set labour standards, develop policies and devise programmes promoting decent work for all women and men. The structure is intended to ensure the views of all three groups are reflected in ILO labour standards, policies, and programmes, though governments have twice as many representatives as the other two groups.

=== Governing body ===
The Governing Body is the executive body of the International Labour Organization. It meets three times a year, in March, June and November. It takes decisions on ILO policy, decides the agenda of the International Labour Conference, adopts the draft Programme and Budget of the Organization for submission to the Conference, elects the Director-General, requests information from the member states concerning labour matters, appoints commissions of inquiry and supervises the work of the International Labour Office.

The Governing Body is composed of 56 titular members (28 governments, 14 employers and 14 workers) and 66 deputy members (28 governments, 19 employers and 19 workers).

Ten of the titular government seats are permanently held by States of chief industrial importance: Brazil, China, France, Germany, India, Italy, Japan, the Russian Federation, the United Kingdom and the United States. The other Government members are elected by the Conference every three years (the last elections were held in June 2024). The Employer and Worker members are elected in their individual capacity.

=== Director-General ===
On 25 March 2022 Gilbert Fossoun Houngbo was elected Director-General of ILO. On 1 October 2022 he succeeded Guy Ryder, who was elected by the ILO Governing Body in October 2012, and re-elected for a second five-year-term in November 2016. He is the organization's first African Director-General. In 2024, a group of African countries that play a crucial role visited the International Labour Office, such as Morocco, where they held talks with the Minister of Economic Integration, Small Business, Employment, and Skills Development, Younes Sekouri. The list of the Directors-General of ILO since its establishment in 1919 is as follows:

Name	Country	Term
Albert Thomas	France	1919–1932
Harold Butler	United Kingdom	1932–1938
John G. Winant	United States	1939–1941
Edward J. Phelan	Ireland	1941–1948
David A. Morse	United States	1948–1970
Clarence Wilfred Jenks	United Kingdom	1970–1973
Francis Blanchard	France	1974–1989
Michel Hansenne	Belgium	1989–1999
Juan Somavía	Chile	1999–2012
Guy Ryder	United Kingdom	2012–2022
Gilbert Houngbo	Togo	2022–present

=== Membership ===
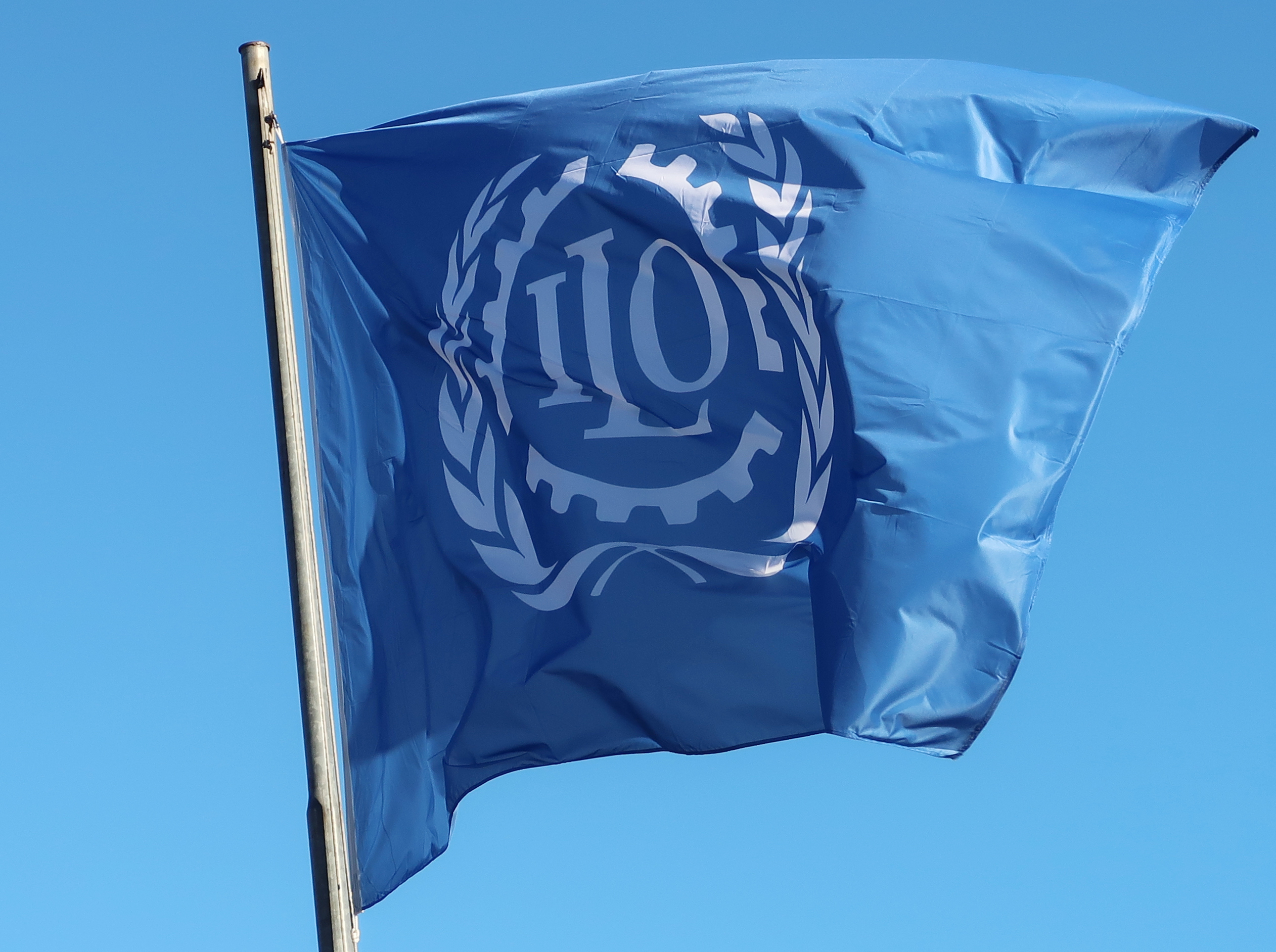
International Labour Organization flag

The ILO has 187 state members. 186 of the 193 member states of the United Nations plus the Cook Islands are members of the ILO. The 7 UN member states which are not members of the ILO are Andorra, Bhutan, Liechtenstein, Micronesia, Monaco, Nauru, and North Korea.

The ILO constitution permits any member of the UN to become a member of the ILO. To gain membership, a nation must inform the director-general that it accepts all the obligations of the ILO constitution. Other, non-UN states can be admitted by a two-thirds vote of all delegates, including a two-thirds vote of government delegates, at any ILO General Conference. The Cook Islands, a non-UN state, joined in June 2015.

Countries that had been members of the ILO under the League of Nations remained members when the organization's new constitution came into effect in 1946.

== Objectives ==
The Declaration of Philadelphia (10 May 1944) restated the traditional objectives of the International Labour Organization and then branched out in two new directions: the centrality of human rights to social policy, and the need for international economic planning. With the end of the world war in sight, it sought to adapt the guiding principles of the ILO "to the new realities and to the new aspirations aroused by the hopes for a better world." It was adopted at the 26th Conference of the ILO in Philadelphia, Pennsylvania.

In 1946, when the ILO's constitution was being revised by the General Conference convened in Montreal, the Declaration of Philadelphia was annexed to the constitution and forms an integral part of it by Article 1. Most of the demands of the declaration were a result of a partnership of American and Western European labour unions and the ILO secretariat.

"Labour is not a commodity" is the principle expressed in the preamble to the International Labour Organization's founding documents. It expresses the view that people should not be treated like inanimate commodities, capital, another mere factor of production, or resources. Instead, people who work for a living should be treated as human beings and accorded dignity and respect. Paul O'Higgins attributes the phrase to John Kells Ingram, who used it in 1880 during a meeting in Dublin of the British Trades Union Congress.

== History ==
=== Origins ===
It is one of the first specialized agencies for the UN. While the ILO was established as an agency of the League of Nations following World War I, its founders had made great strides in social thought and action before 1919. The core members all knew one another from earlier private professional and ideological networks, in which they exchanged knowledge, experiences, and ideas on social policy. Pre-war "epistemic communities", such as the International Association for Labour Legislation (IALL), founded in 1900, and political networks, such as the socialist Second International, were a decisive factor in the institutionalization of international labour politics.

In the post-World War I euphoria, the idea of a "makeable society" was an important catalyst behind the social engineering of the ILO architects. As a new discipline, international labour law became a useful instrument for putting social reforms into practice. The utopian ideals of the founding members—social justice and the right to decent work—were changed by diplomatic and political compromises made at the Paris Peace Conference of 1919, showing the ILO's balance between idealism and pragmatism.

Over the course of the First World War, the international labour movement proposed a comprehensive programme of protection for the working classes, conceived as compensation for labour's support during the war. Post-war reconstruction and the protection of labour unions occupied the attention of many nations during and immediately after World War I. In Great Britain, the Whitley Commission, a subcommittee of the Reconstruction Commission, recommended in its July 1918 Final Report that "industrial councils" be established throughout the world. The British Labour Party had issued its own reconstruction programme in the document titled Labour and the New Social Order. In February 1918, the third Inter-Allied Labour and Socialist Conference (representing delegates from Great Britain, France, Belgium and Italy) issued its report, advocating an international labour rights body, an end to secret diplomacy, and other goals. And in December 1918, the American Federation of labour (AFL) issued its own distinctively apolitical report, which called for the achievement of numerous incremental improvements via the collective bargaining process.

==== IFTU Bern Conference ====
As the war drew to a close, two competing visions for the post-war world emerged. The first was offered by the International Federation of Trade Unions (IFTU), which called for a meeting in Bern, Switzerland, in July 1919. The Bern meeting would consider both the future of the IFTU and the various proposals which had been made in the previous few years. The IFTU also proposed including delegates from the Central Powers as equals. Samuel Gompers, president of the AFL, boycotted the meeting, wanting the Central Powers delegates in a subservient role as an admission of guilt for their countries' role in bringing about war. Instead, Gompers favoured a meeting in Paris which would consider President Woodrow Wilson's Fourteen Points only as a platform. Despite the American boycott, the Bern meeting went ahead as scheduled. In its final report, the Bern Conference demanded an end to wage labour and the establishment of socialism. If these ends could not be immediately achieved, then an international body attached to the League of Nations should enact and enforce legislation to protect workers and trade unions.

==== Commission on International Labour Legislation ====
Meanwhile, the Paris Peace Conference sought to dampen public support for communism. Subsequently, the Allied Powers agreed that clauses should be inserted into the emerging peace treaty protecting labour unions and workers' rights, and that an international labour body be established to help guide international labour relations in the future. The advisory Commission on International Labour Legislation was established by the Peace Conference to draft these proposals. The Commission met for the first time on 1 February 1919, and Gompers was elected as the chairman.

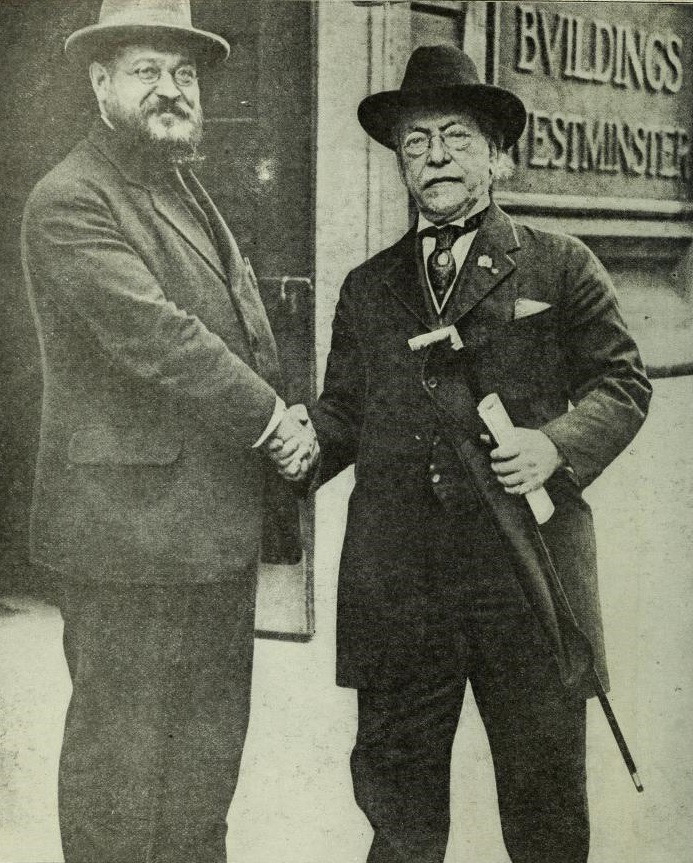
Samuel Gompers (right) with Albert Thomas, 1918

Two competing proposals for an international body emerged during the commission's meetings. The British proposed establishing an international parliament to enact labour laws which each member of the League would be required to implement. Each nation would have two delegates to the parliament, one each from labour and management. An international labour office would collect statistics on labour issues and enforce the new international laws. Philosophically opposed to the concept of an international parliament and convinced that international standards would lower the few protections achieved in the United States, Gompers proposed that the international labour body be authorized only to make recommendations and that enforcement be left up to the League of Nations. Despite vigorous opposition from the British, the American proposal was adopted.

Gompers also set the agenda for the draft charter protecting workers' rights. The Americans made 10 proposals. Three were adopted without change: That labour should not be treated as a commodity; that all workers had the right to a wage sufficient to live on; and that women should receive equal pay for equal work. A proposal protecting the freedom of speech, press, assembly, and association was amended to include only freedom of association. A proposed ban on the international shipment of goods made by children under the age of 16 was amended to ban goods made by children under the age of 14. A proposal to require an eight-hour work day was amended to require the eight-hour work day or the 40-hour work week (an exception was made for countries where productivity was low). Four other American proposals were rejected. Meanwhile, international delegates proposed three additional clauses, which were adopted: One or more days for weekly rest; equality of laws for foreign workers; and regular and frequent inspection of factory conditions.

The Commission issued its final report on 4 March 1919, and the Peace Conference adopted it without amendment on 11 April. The report became Part XIII of the Treaty of Versailles.

=== Interwar period ===
The first annual International Labour Conference (ILC) began on 29 October 1919 at the Pan American Union Building in Washington, D.C. and adopted the first six International Labour Conventions, which dealt with hours of work in industry, unemployment, maternity protection, night work for women, minimum age, and night work for young persons in industry. The prominent French socialist Albert Thomas became its first director-general.

Despite open disappointment and sharp critique, the revived International Federation of Trade Unions (IFTU) quickly adapted itself to this mechanism. The IFTU increasingly oriented its international activities around the lobby work of the ILO.

At the time of establishment, the U.S. government was not a member of ILO, as the US Senate rejected the covenant of the League of Nations, and the United States could not join any of its agencies. Following the election of Franklin Delano Roosevelt to the U.S. presidency, the new administration made renewed efforts to join the ILO without league membership. On 19 June 1934, the U.S. Congress passed a joint resolution authorizing the president to join ILO without joining the League of Nations as a whole. On 22 June 1934, the ILO adopted a resolution inviting the U.S. government to join the organization. On 20 August 1934, the U.S. government responded positively and took its seat at the ILO.

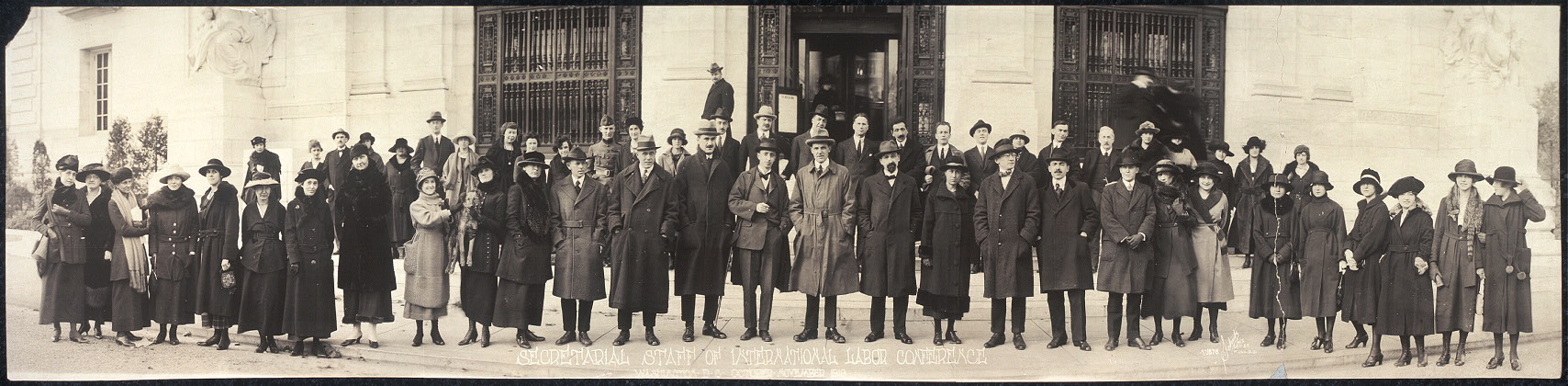
Greenwood, Ernest H. (of the United States – Deputy secretary general of the conference) / Secretary General: Harold B. Butler (Great Britain) / Deputy Secretaries General: Ernest H. Greenwood (United States) / Guido Pardo (Italy) /Legal Adviser: Manley 0. Hudson (United States) / with staff of the first International Labour Conference, in Washington, D.C., in 1919, in front of the Pan American Union Building

=== Wartime and the United Nations ===
During the Second World War, when Switzerland was surrounded by German troops, ILO director John G. Winant made the decision to leave Geneva. In August 1940, the government of Canada officially invited the ILO to be housed at McGill University in Montreal. Forty staff members were transferred to the temporary offices and continued to work from McGill until 1948.

The ILO became the first specialized agency of the United Nations system after the demise of the League in 1946. Its constitution, as amended, includes the Declaration of Philadelphia (1944) on the aims and purposes of the organization.

=== Cold War era ===
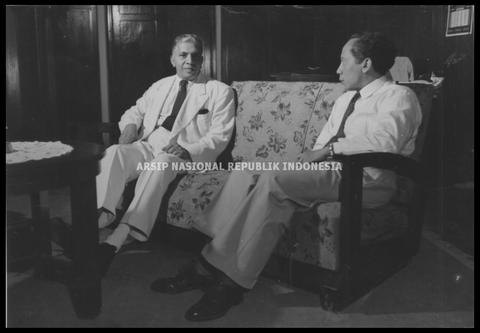
R. Rao, the Deputy Director General of ILO with Wilopo, the then-Indonesian labour minister, 15 March 1950

Beginning in the late 1950s the organization was under pressure to make provisions for the potential membership of ex-colonies which had become independent; in the Director General's report of 1963 the needs of the potential new members were first recognized. The tensions produced by these changes in the world environment negatively affected the established politics within the organization and they were the precursor to the eventual problems of the organization with the USA.

In July 1970, the United States withdrew 50% of its financial support to the ILO following the appointment of an assistant director-general from the Soviet Union. This appointment (by the ILO's British director-general, C. Wilfred Jenks) drew particular criticism from AFL–CIO president George Meany and from New Jersey Assemblyman John E. Rooney. However, the funds were eventually paid.

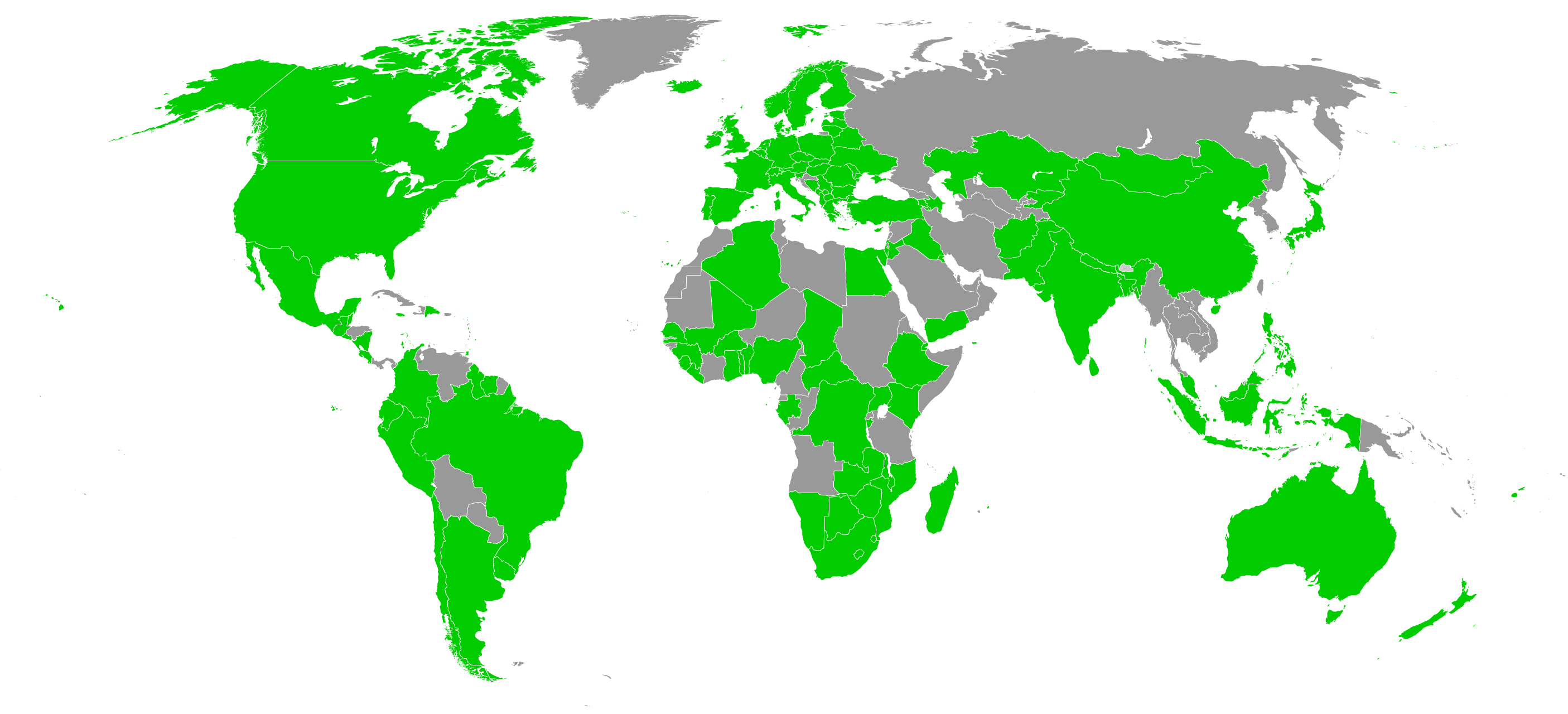
Ratifications of 1976 Tripartite Consultation Convention

On 12 June 1975, the ILO voted to grant the Palestine Liberation Organization observer status at its meetings. Representatives of the United States and Israel walked out of the meeting. The US House of Representatives subsequently decided to withhold funds. The United States gave notice of full withdrawal on 6 November 1975, stating that the organization had become politicized. The United States also suggested that representation from communist countries was not truly "tripartite"—including government, workers, and employers—because of the structure of these economies. The withdrawal became effective on 1 November 1977.

The United States returned to the organization in 1980 after extracting some concession from the organization. It was partly responsible for the ILO's shift away from a human rights approach and towards support for the Washington Consensus. Economist Guy Standing wrote "the ILO quietly ceased to be an international body attempting to redress structural inequality and became one promoting employment equity".

In 1981, the government of Poland declared martial law. It interrupted the activities of Solidarność, detained many of its leaders and members. The ILO Committee on Freedom of Association filed a complaint against Poland at the 1982 International Labour Conference. A Commission of Inquiry established to investigate found Poland had violated ILO Conventions No. 87 on freedom of association and No. 98 on trade union rights, which the country had ratified in 1957. The ILO and many other countries and organizations put pressure on the Polish government, which finally gave legal status to Solidarność in 1989. During that same year, there was a roundtable discussion between the government and Solidarność which agreed on terms of relegalization of the organization under ILO principles. The government also agreed to hold the first free elections in Poland since the Second World War.

== Offices ==
=== ILO headquarters ===
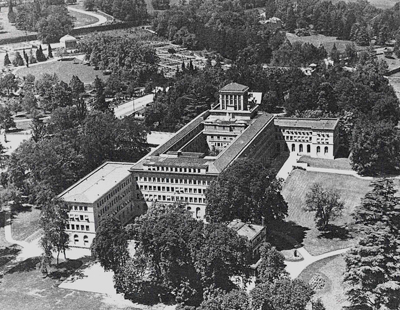
Centre William Rappard, seat of the ILO between 1926 and 1974, now hosting the WTO

The ILO is headquartered in Geneva, Switzerland. In its first months of existence in 1919, it offices were located in London, only to move to Geneva in the summer 1920. The first seat in Geneva was on the Pregny hill in the Ariana estate, in the building that used to host the Thudicum boarding school and currently the headquarters of the International Committee of the Red Cross. As the office grew, the Office relocated to a purpose-built headquarters by the shores of lake Leman, designed by Georges Épitaux and inaugurated in 1926 (currently the seat of the World Trade Organization). During the Second World War the Office was temporarily relocated to McGill University in Montreal, Canada.

The current seat of the ILO's headquarters is located on the Pregny hill, not far from its initial seat. The building, a biconcave rectangular block designed by Eugène Beaudoin, Pier Luigi Nervi and Alberto Camenzind, was purpose-built between 1969–1974 in a severe rationalist style and, at the time of construction, constituted the largest administrative building in Switzerland.

=== Regional offices ===
- Regional Office for Africa, in Abidjan, Côte d'Ivoire
- Regional Office for Asia and the Pacific, in Bangkok, Thailand
- Regional Office for Europe and Central Asia, in Geneva, Switzerland
- Regional Office for Latin America and the Caribbean, in Lima, Peru
- Regional Office for the Arab States, in Beirut, Lebanon

=== Sub-regional offices ===
Called "Decent Work Technical Support Teams (DWT)", they provide technical support to the work of a number of countries under their area of competence.

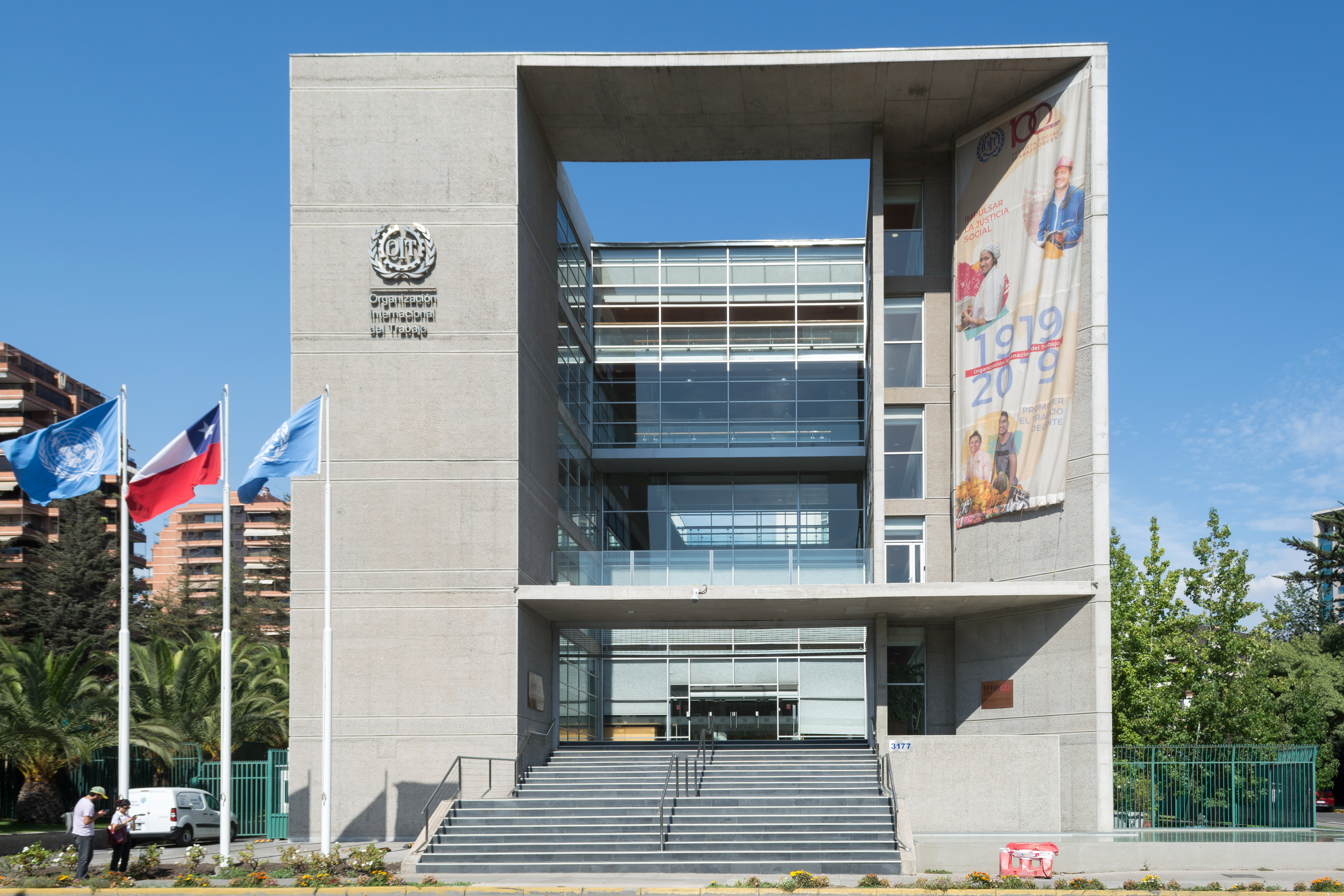
ILO office in Santiago, Chile

- DWT for North Africa, in Cairo, Egypt
- DWT for West Africa, in Dakar, Senegal
- DWT for Eastern and Southern Africa, in Pretoria, South Africa
- DWT for Central Africa, in Yaoundé, Cameroon
- DWT for the Arab States, in Beirut, Lebanon
- DWT for South Asia, in New Delhi, India
- DWT for East and South-East Asia and the Pacific, in Bangkok, Thailand
- DWT for Central and Eastern Europe, in Budapest, Hungary
- DWT for Eastern Europe and Central Asia, in Moscow, Russia
- DWT for the Andean Countries, in Lima, Peru
- DWT for the Caribbean Countries, in Port of Spain, Trinidad and Tobago
- DWT for Central American Countries, in San José, Costa Rica
- DWT for Countries of the South Cone of Latin America, in Santiago, Chile

=== Country and liaison offices ===
- In Africa: Abidjan, Abuja, Addis Ababa, Algiers, Antananarivo, Cairo, Dakar, Dar es Salaam, Harare, Kinshasa, Lusaka, Pretoria, Yaoundé
- In the Arab States: Beirut, Doha, Jerusalem
- In Asia and the Pacific: Bangkok, Beijing, Colombo, Dhaka, Hanoi, Islamabad, Jakarta, Kabul, Kathmandu, Manila, New Delhi, Suva, Tokyo, Yangon
- In Europe and Central Asia: Ankara, Berlin, Brussels, Budapest, Lisbon, Madrid, Moscow, Paris, Rome
- In the Americas: Brasília, Buenos Aires, Mexico City, New York, Lima, Port-of-Spain, San José, Santiago, Washington, D.C.

== Activities ==
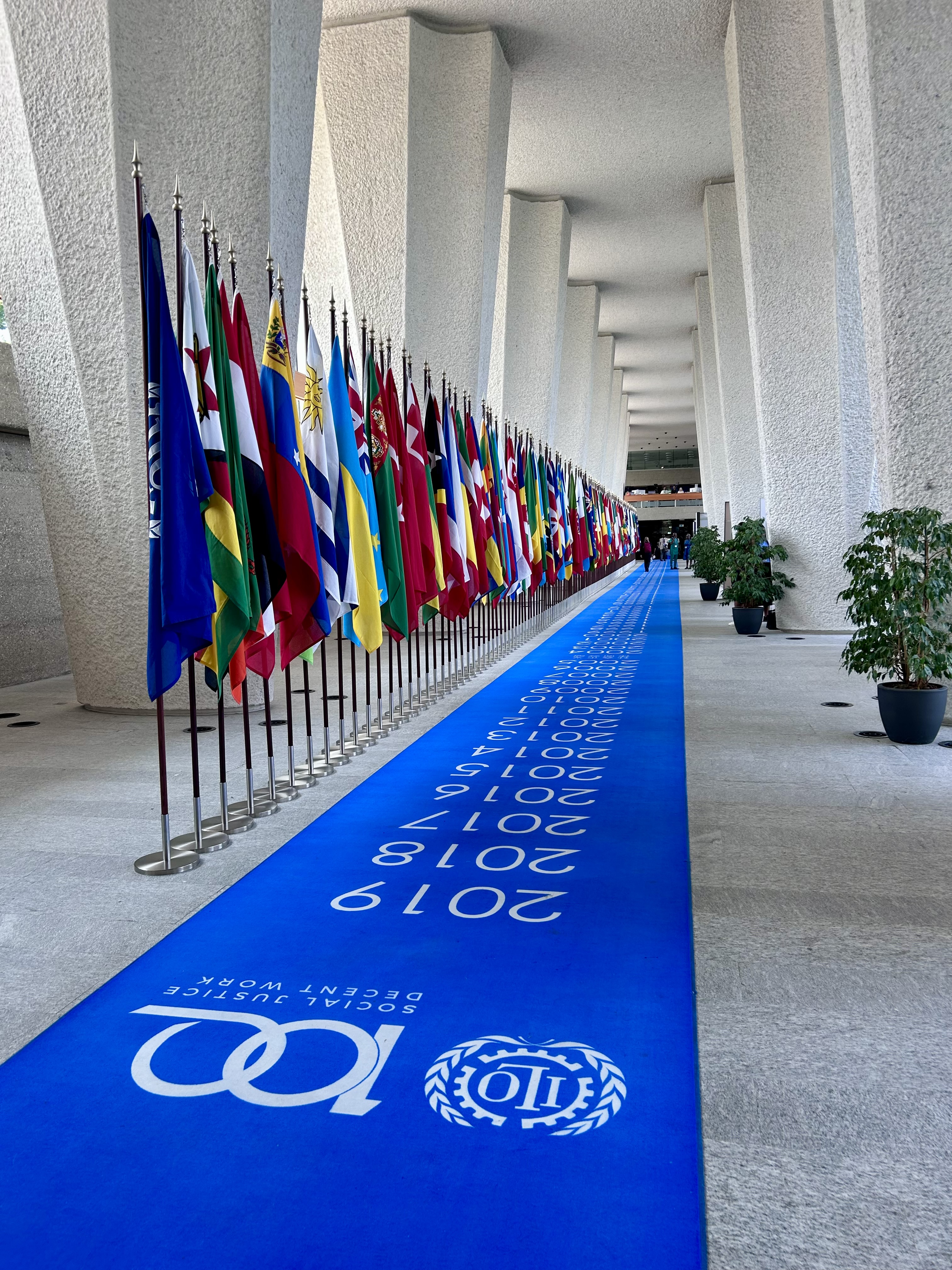
The hallway in the centre of the ILO headquarters building in Geneva

=== Conventions ===
Through 2026, the ILO had adopted 193 conventions. If these conventions are ratified by enough votes consisting of governments, employers and worker representatives, they come in force. However, ILO conventions are considered international labour standards regardless of ratification. When a convention comes into force, it creates a legal obligation for ratifying nations to apply its provisions.

Every year the International Labour Conference's Committee on the Application of Standards examines a number of alleged breaches of international labour standards. Governments are required to submit reports detailing their compliance with the obligations of the conventions they have ratified. Conventions that have not been ratified by member states have the same legal force as recommendations.

In 1998, the 86th International Labour Conference adopted the Declaration on Fundamental Principles and Rights at Work. This declaration contains four fundamental policies:

- The right of workers to associate freely and bargain collectively
- The end of forced and compulsory labour
- The end of child labour
- The end of unfair discrimination among workers

The ILO asserts that its members have an obligation to work towards fully respecting these principles, embodied in relevant ILO conventions. The ILO conventions that embody the fundamental principles have now been ratified by most member states.

Protocols are always linked to Conventions, even though they are international treaties they do not exist on their own. As with Conventions, Protocols can be ratified.

Recommendations do not have the binding force of conventions and are not subject to ratification. Recommendations may be adopted at the same time as conventions to supplement the latter with additional or more detailed provisions. In other cases recommendations may be adopted separately and may address issues separate from particular conventions.

=== International Labour Conference ===
Once a year, the ILO organizes the International Labour Conference (ILC) in Geneva to set the broad policies of the ILO, including conventions and recommendations. Also known as the "international parliament of labour", the conference makes decisions about the ILO's general policy, work programme and budget and also elects the Governing Body.

The first conference took place in 1919: see Interwar period above.

Each member state is represented by a delegation composed of two government delegates, an employer delegate, a worker delegate. All of them have individual voting rights and all votes are equal, regardless of the population of the delegate's member State. The employer and worker delegates are normally chosen in agreement with the most representative national organizations of employers and workers. Usually, the workers and employers' delegates coordinate their voting. All delegates have the same rights and are not required to vote in blocs.

Delegates can attend with advisers and substitute delegates, and all have the same rights: they can express themselves freely and vote as they wish. This diversity of viewpoints does not prevent decisions from being adopted by very large majorities or unanimously.

Heads of State and prime ministers also participate in the Conference. International organizations, both governmental and others, also attend but as observers.

The 109th session of the International Labour Conference was delayed from 2020 to May 2021 and was held online because of the COVID-19 pandemic. The first meeting was on 20 May 2021 in Geneva for the election of its officers. Further sittings were held in June, November and December. The 110th session took place from 27 May to 11 June 2022. The 111th session of the International Labour Conference took place in June 2023.

=== Global forum meetings ===
The ILO organizes regular international tripartite gatherings and global dialogue fora on issues of interest to specific sectors of business and employment, for example on supply chain safety in the packing of containers for global shipping (2011), and on employment conditions in early childhood education (2012).

=== Labour statistics ===
The ILO is a major provider of labour statistics. Labour statistics are an important tool for its member states to monitor their progress toward improving labour standards. As part of their statistical work, ILO maintains several databases. This database covers 11 major data series for over 200 countries. In addition, ILO publishes a number of compilations of labour statistics, such as the Key Indicators of Labour Markets (KILM). KILM covers 20 main indicators on labour participation rates, employment, unemployment, educational attainment, labour cost, and economic performance. Many of these indicators have been prepared by other organizations. For example, the Division of International Labour Comparisons of the U.S. Bureau of labour Statistics prepares the hourly compensation in manufacturing indicator.

The US Department of labour also publishes a yearly report containing a List of Goods Produced by Child labour or Forced labour issued by the Bureau of International labour Affairs. The December 2014 updated edition of the report listed a total of 74 countries and 136 goods.

The ILO is the custodian agency for nine of the 17 indicators of Sustainable Development Goal 8 (SDG 8). This goal is about "decent work and economic growth". For example, ILO is the agency for Indicator 8.b.1 of Target 8.b. The wording of this target is: "By 2020, develop and operationalize a global strategy for youth employment and implement the Global Jobs Pact of the International Labour Organization". As such, ILO is in charge of the data gathering for the progress of the Global Youth Empowerment Strategy.

=== Training and teaching units ===
The International Training Centre of the International Labour Organization (ITCILO) is based in Turin, Italy. Together with the University of Turin Department of Law, the ITC offers training for ILO officers and secretariat members, as well as offering educational programmes. The ITC offers more than 450 training and educational programmes and projects every year for some 11,000 people around the world.

For instance, the ITCILO offers a Master of Laws programme in management of development, which aims specialize professionals in the field of cooperation and development.

== Responses to issues ==
=== Child labour ===
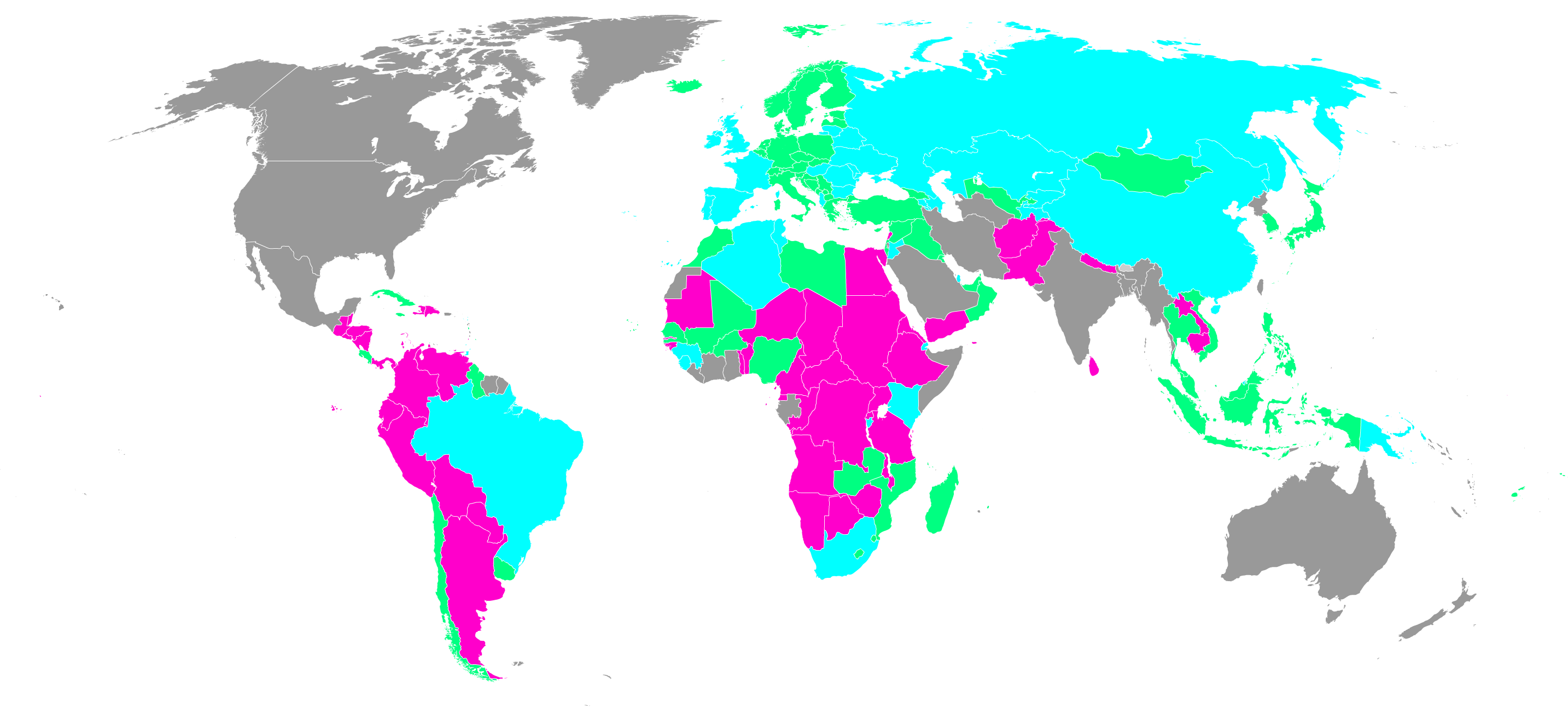
Parties to ILO's 1973 Minimum Age Convention, and the minimum ages they have designated: purple, 14 years; green, 15 years; blue, 16 years

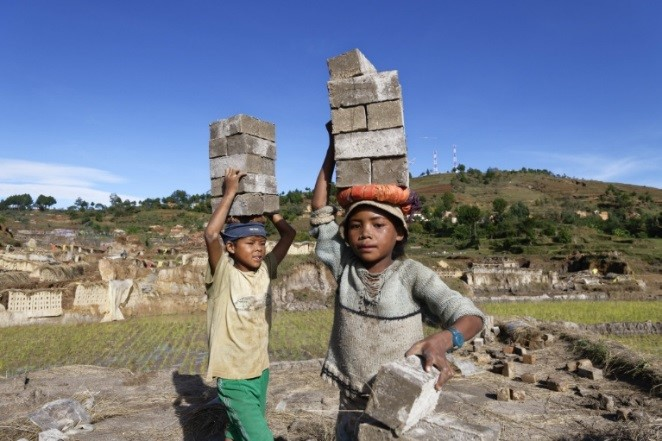
These young boys are among the millions of children in child labour worldwide. They work at a brickyard in Antsirabe, Madagascar.

Child labour is often defined as work that deprives children of their childhood, potential, dignity, and is harmful to their physical and mental development. Child labour refers to work that is mentally, physically, socially or morally dangerous and harmful to children. Further, it can involve interfering with their schooling by depriving them of the opportunity to attend school, obliging them to leave school prematurely, or requiring them to attempt to combine school attendance with excessively long and heavy work.

The ILO's International Programme on the Elimination of Child Labour (IPEC) was created in 1992 with the overall goal of the progressive elimination of child labour, which was to be achieved through strengthening the capacity of countries to deal with the problem and promoting a worldwide movement to combat child labour. The IPEC currently has operations in 88 countries, with an annual expenditure on technical cooperation projects that reached over US$61 million in 2008. It is the largest programme of its kind globally and the biggest single operational programme of the ILO.

The number and range of the IPEC's partners have expanded over the years and now include employers' and workers' organizations, other international and government agencies, private businesses, community-based organizations, NGOs, the media, parliamentarians, the judiciary, universities, religious groups and children and their families.

The IPEC's work to eliminate child labour is an important facet of the ILO's Decent Work Agenda. Child labour prevents children from acquiring the skills and education they need for a better future.

The ILO also hosts a Global Conference on the Elimination of Child Labour every four years. The most recent conference was held in Durban, South Africa from 15 to 20 May 2022.

The ILO established the World Day Against Child Labour on June 12 as an annual event starting in 2002 to raise awareness and prompt action to tackle child labour worldwide. The event particularly targets the eradication of slavery and the use of child soldiers.

==== Exceptions in indigenous communities ====
Because of different cultural views involving labour, the ILO developed a series of culturally sensitive mandates, including convention Nos. 169, 107, 138, and 182, to protect indigenous culture, traditions, and identities. Convention Nos. 138 and 182 lead in the fight against child labour, while Nos. 107 and 169 promote the rights of indigenous and tribal peoples and protect their right to define their own developmental priorities.

In many indigenous communities, parents believe that children learn important life lessons through the act of work and through the participation in daily life. Working is seen as a learning process preparing children of the future tasks they will eventually have to do as an adult. It is a belief that the family's and child well-being and survival is a shared responsibility between members of the whole family. They also see work as an intrinsic part of their child's developmental process. While these attitudes toward child work remain, many children and parents from indigenous communities still highly value education.

=== Forced labour ===
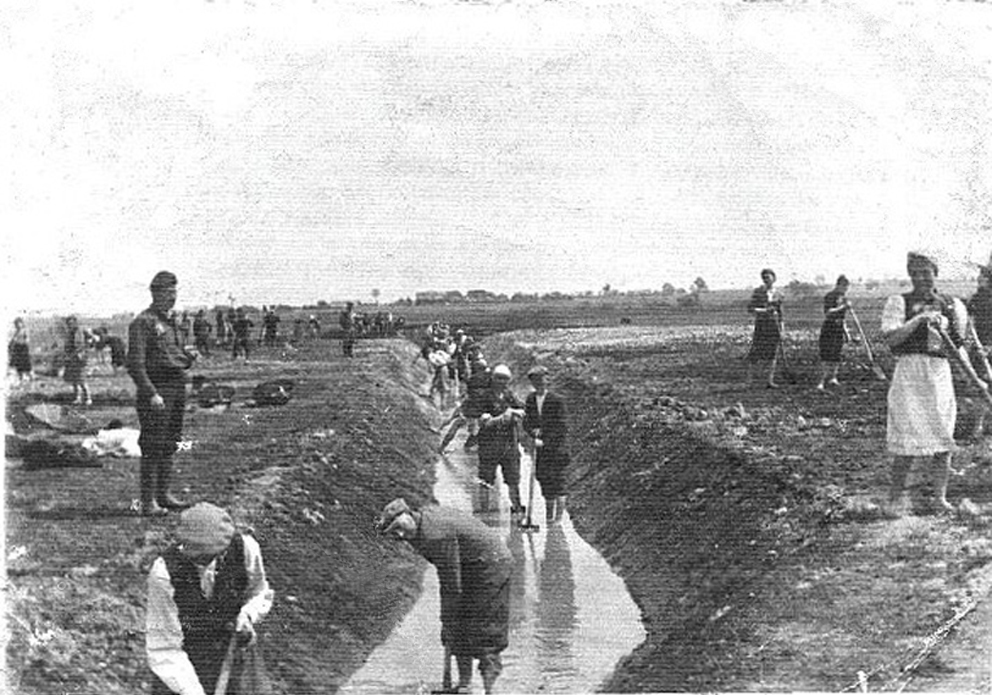
Krychów forced labour camp 1940 (Krowie Bagno)

The ILO has considered the fight against forced labour to be one of its main priorities. During the interwar years, the issue was mainly considered a colonial phenomenon, and the ILO's concern was to establish minimum standards protecting the inhabitants of colonies from the worst abuses committed by economic interests. After 1945, the goal became to set a uniform and universal standard, determined by the higher awareness gained during World War II of politically and economically motivated systems of forced labour, but debates were hampered by the Cold War and by exemptions claimed by colonial powers. Since the 1960s, declarations of labour standards as a component of human rights have been weakened by governments of postcolonial countries claiming a need to exercise extraordinary powers over labour in their role as emergency regimes promoting rapid economic development.

Ratifications of the ILO's 1930 Forced Labour Convention, with non-ratifiers shown in red

In 1998, the International Labour Conference adopted a Declaration on Fundamental Principles and Rights at Work and its follow-up that obligates member states to respect, promote and realize freedom of association and the right to collective bargaining, the elimination of all forms of forced or compulsory labour, the effective abolition of child labour, and the elimination of discrimination in respect of employment and occupation.

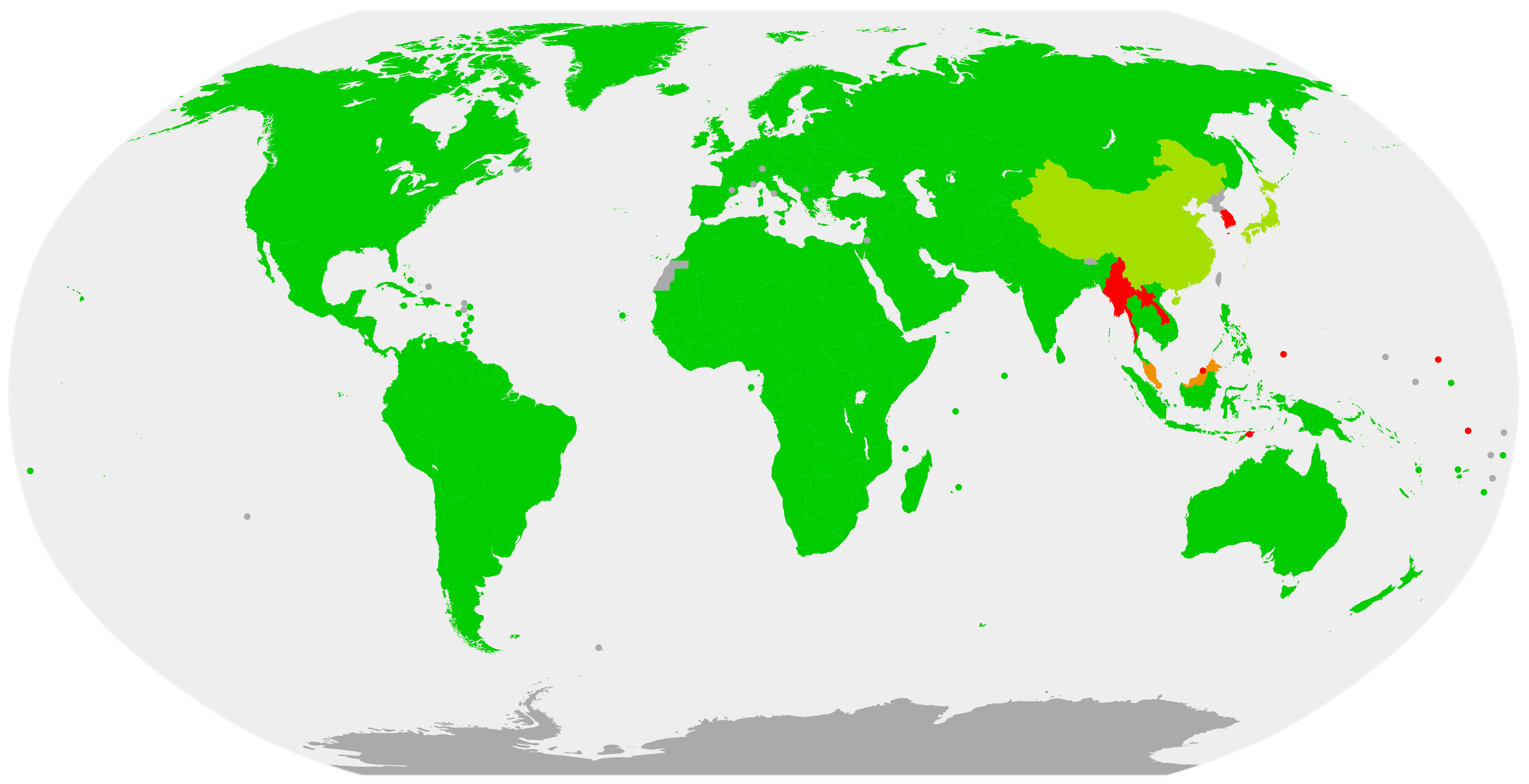
Ratifications of the ILO's 1957 Abolition of Forced Labour Convention, with non-ratifiers shown in red

In November 2001, following the publication of the InFocus Programme's first global report on forced labour, the ILO's governing body created a special action programme to combat forced labour (SAP-FL), as part of broader efforts to promote the 1998 Declaration on Fundamental Principles and Rights at Work and its follow-up. The SAP-FL was created in November 2001 "to tackle the elimination of all forms of forced or compulsory labour, one of its foremost concerns, through both technical assistance and promotional means." SAP-FL has developed indicators of forced labour practices and published survey reports on forced labour.

In 2013, the SAP-FL was integrated into the ILO's Fundamental Principles and Rights at Work Branch (FUNDAMENTALS) bringing together the fight against forced and child labour and working in the context of Alliance 8.7.

One major tool to fight forced labour was the adoption of the ILO Forced Labour Protocol by the International Labour Conference in 2014. It was ratified for the second time in 2015 and on 9 November 2016 it entered into force. The new protocol brings the existing ILO Convention 29 on Forced Labour, adopted in 1930, into the modern era to address practices such as human trafficking. The accompanying Recommendation 203 provides technical guidance on its implementation.

In 2015, the ILO launched a global campaign to end modern slavery, in partnership with the International Organization of Employers (IOE) and the International Trade Union Confederation (ITUC). The 50 for Freedom Campaign aims to mobilize public support and encourage countries to ratify the ILO's Forced Labour Protocol.

=== Minimum wage law ===
To protect the right of labours for fixing minimum wage, ILO has created Minimum Wage-Fixing Machinery Convention, 1928, Minimum Wage Fixing Machinery (Agriculture) Convention, 1951 and Minimum Wage Fixing Convention, 1970 as minimum wage law.

=== Commercialized sex ===
From the moment its creation in the 1919 Treaty of Versailles, the ILO has been concerned with the controversial issue of commercial sex. Prior to the creation of the ILO and League of Nations, the issue of sex work had been exclusively under the jurisdiction of the state, now, the ILO and League of Nations believed the issue transcended borders and within their jurisdiction. In the early twentieth, commercialized sex was considered both immoral and criminal activity. Initially, the ILO strongly believed prostitution was linked to vulnerable single working women emigrating to other nations without being under the paternal supervision of a man. After the widespread destruction caused by World War I, the ILO saw prostitution as spreading contagion requiring regulation. Under the leadership of the French socialist Albert Thomas, the ILO created a medical division whose primary focus was on male sailors whose lives were viewed as "nomadic" and "promiscuous", which made these men susceptible to infection of STD's. After the conclusion of the Genoa maritime conference in 1920, the ILO proclaimed itself as the critical leader of the prevention and treatment of STD's in sailors. In the interwar years, the ILO also sought to protect female workers in dangers trades, but delegates to ILO Conferences did not consider the sex trade to be "work", which was conceived of as industrial labour. The ILO believed that if women worked industrial jobs, this would be a deterrent from them living immoral lives. In order to make these industrial jobs more attractive, the ILO promoted better wages and safer working conditions, both intended to prevent women from falling victim to the temptation of the sex trades.

Following the creation of the United Nations, the ILO took a back seat to the newly formed organization on the issue of commercialized sex. The UN Commission on the Status of Women called for abolishing both sex trafficking and prostitution. In the 1950s, the UN Economic and Social Council and the International Police Organization sought to end any activity that resembled slavery, classifying sex trafficking and prostitution as criminal rather than labour issues.

Beginning in 1976, the ILO and other organizations began to examine the working and living conditions of rural women in developing countries. One example the ILO investigated was the go-go bars and the growing phenomenon of hired wives in Thailand, which both thrived because the development of U.S. military bases in the region. In the late 1970s, the ILO established the Programme on Rural Women, which investigated the involvement of young masseuses in the sex trade in Bangkok. It was critical because it was the first time in the history of the ILO or any of its branches that prostitution was described as a form of labour. In the decades that followed, the increase in sex tourism and the exploding AIDS epidemic strengthened ILO interest in the commercial sex trade.

=== HIV/AIDS ===
The International Labour Organization (ILO) is the lead UN-agency on HIV workplace policies and programmes and private sector mobilization. ILOAIDS is the branch of the ILO dedicated to this issue.

The ILO has been involved with the HIV response since 1998, attempting to prevent potentially devastating impact on labour and productivity and that it says can be an enormous burden for working people, their families and communities. In June 2001, the ILO's governing body adopted a pioneering code of practice on HIV/AIDS and the world of work, which was launched during a special session of the UN General Assembly.

The same year, ILO became a cosponsor of the Joint United Nations Programme on HIV/AIDS (UNAIDS).

In 2010, the 99th International Labour Conference adopted the ILO's recommendation concerning HIV and AIDS and the world of work, 2010 (No. 200), the first international labour standard on HIV and AIDS. The recommendation lays out a comprehensive set of principles to protect the rights of HIV-positive workers and their families, while scaling up prevention in the workplace. Working under the theme of Preventing HIV, Protecting Human Rights at Work, ILOAIDS undertakes a range of policy advisory, research and technical support functions in the area of HIV and AIDS and the world of work. The ILO also works on promoting social protection as a means of reducing vulnerability to HIV and mitigating its impact on those living with or affected by HIV.

ILOAIDS ran a "Getting to Zero" campaign to arrive at zero new infections, zero AIDS-related deaths and zero-discrimination by 2015. Building on this campaign, ILOAIDS is executing a programme of voluntary and confidential counselling and testing at work, known as VCT@WORK.

=== Migrant workers ===
As the word "migrant" suggests, migrant workers refer to those who moves from one country to another to do their job. For the rights of migrant workers, the first ILC adopted a recommendation on equality and coordination, and the ILO has adopted conventions, including Migrant Workers (Supplementary Provisions) Convention, 1975 and United Nations Convention on the Protection of the Rights of All Migrant Workers and Members of Their Families in 1990.

=== Domestic workers ===
Domestic workers are those who perform a variety of tasks for and in other peoples' homes. For example, they may cook, clean the house, and look after children. Yet they are often the ones with the least consideration, excluded from labour and social protection. This is mainly due to the fact that women have traditionally carried out the tasks without pay. For the rights and decent work of domestic workers including migrant domestic workers, ILO has adopted the Convention on Domestic Workers on 16 June 2011.

=== Environmental sustainability ===
The ILO has been on working on integrating environmental sustainability into its activities (or greening its activities) and the broader discourse since the 1970s. For example, some of ILO's reports in 1972 to 1975 have investigated linkages between occupational safety and health, economic development and environmental protection. In the 2000s ILO began to promote a "socially just transition to green jobs". The organisation defined green jobs as "decent jobs that contribute to preserving and restoring the environment".

Since 2017, the concept of just transition has been firmly embedded within the ILO's position. For example, its Centenary Declaration for the Future of Work in 2019 stated that: "[...] the ILO must direct its efforts to: (i) ensuring a just transition to a future of work that contributes to sustainable development in its economic, social and environmental dimensions". A just transition focuses on the connection between energy transition and equitable approaches to decarbonization that support broader development goals.

The ILO has also looked at the transition to a green economy, and the impact thereof on employment. It came to the conclusion a shift to a greener economy could create 24 million new jobs globally by 2030, if the right policies are put in place. Also, if a transition to a green economy were not to take place, 72 million full-time jobs may be lost by 2030 due to heat stress, and temperature increases will lead to shorter available work hours, particularly in agriculture.

== Awards ==
In 1969, the ILO received the Nobel Peace Prize for improving fraternity and peace among nations, pursuing decent work and justice for workers, and providing technical assistance to other developing nations.

== Criticism ==
=== Relationship with state of Qatar ===
==== Formal complaint ====
In 2014, amid growing international scrutiny of Qatar's treatment of foreign workers in the lead-up to the 2022 FIFA World Cup, international trade unions filed a formal complaint with the ILO, accusing Qatar of failing to address forced labour and widespread workers' rights violations.

In March 2023, The New York Times alleged that Qatar "embarked on a yearslong campaign of political maneuvering that helped turn the [ILO]... from critic to ally", and that intense lobbying by Qatari diplomats, rallying "employers and countries with Qatari business interests", successfully prevented the ILO from opening an investigation.

==== Technical Cooperation Program and allegations of whitewashing ====
The ILO closed the complaint in 2017, and instead established a "Technical Cooperation Program" to help strengthen Qatar's labour regulations. As part of this arrangement, Qatar contributed $25 million to the ILO, which funded the opening of a dedicated ILO project office in Doha in 2018. The ILO stated that the funding was standard practice and did not compromise its mandate, but critics, including a former ILO official, questioned the organization's independence, and noted that the Qatari contribution was initially undisclosed, and of an unusually large sum.

The ILO frequently commended Qatar for implementing labour reforms, such as setting a minimum wage, restricting summertime working hours, and supposedly dismantling the kafala system, consistently taking a positive view. A 2022 ILO report stated that these reforms positively impacted "hundreds of thousands" of migrant workers, a statement repeated by a Qatari official speaking to Financial Times in 2025. A former ILO official told The Guardian in 2023 that the ILO had been "whitewashing Qatar", and that it produced "biased" reports about its reforms. Several current and former employees of the ILO told The New York Times that the organization "often treated Qatar more like a paying client than a country under scrutiny".

ILO officials justified the organization's blunted criticism by saying that the improvements it achieved via cooperation with Qatar were won through "delicate negotiations", and that "criticism... would have undermined that progress"; but, according to The New York Times, "labor advocates, human rights groups and some politicians said they were stunned by what they saw as one-sided public statements that minimized problems". The ILO maintained that while it did point to "the positive trajectory of labour reforms in Qatar", it also continued to "highlight specific gaps and challenges that remain in implementation and enforcement".

==== Scholarly views of the results of the Technical Cooperation Program ====
Abdulhadi Rashid Alkhayareen of Hamad Bin Khalifa University in Qatar found in 2013 that "the key accomplishments of the ILO and the government of Qatar include destroying the kafala system", and that this "signifies a shift toward more open, progressive migrant labor policies and an evolving acceptance of migrant rights and opportunities by the government and members of the mass culture". Zachary R. Calo, also of Hamad Bin Khalifa University, found in 2023 that the ILO "significantly aided the process" of Qatar's legal reforms, but concluded that "while reforms might endure at the level of formal law, the dispute system will fail to deliver genuine justice to workers unless it is refashioned". Antoine Duval of the T.M.C. Asser Instituut also noted in 2023 the legal changes that have been taken place "on paper" throughout Qatar's cooperation with the ILO, but criticized the organization for praising Qatari steps which he called "Potemkin reforms", and for embracing a false "rosy reformist narrative" alongside Qatar and FIFA.

==== Qatargate scandal ====
The ILO's positive reviews were cited and echoed by EU politicians, some of whom were later implicated in the Qatargate corruption scandal at the European Parliament. A Belgian official close to the Qatargate investigation told The New York Times that "the Belgian authorities see Qatar's campaign at the International Labor Organization as a key part of its efforts to shape public opinion". According to The New York Times, on the eve of the World Cup, Qatari officials asked the ILO to refrain from making negative commentary during the tournament, and "the agency's public statements during the World Cup made no mention of persistent labor abuses, opting instead to applaud its cooperation with the government".

==== 2023 presidency of International Labour Conference ====
In June 2023, Qatar's minister of labour, Ali bin Samikh al-Marri, was elected to preside over the ILO's International Labour Conference in Geneva. The nomination triggered a backlash from trade unions and labour and human rights groups, who "expressed concerns about his nomination", worrying that "a Qatari presidency would be a blow to the organisation's credibility and reputation" given the country's continued labour abuses and the Qatargate corruption scandal. The ILO's worker's group decided not to oppose al-Marri's presidency, and it took course as planned.

==== 2025 consideration to move Middle East HQ to Doha ====
In late 2025, the ILO considered moving its Middle East headquarters from Beirut, Lebanon to Doha, Qatar, estimating that this would help save $500,000 for 2026-2027, and citing "support from host government", "persistent instability in Lebanon" and better access to Gulf resources as reasons for the move. A Qatari official said Qatar "expressed its openness to hosting the ILO's regional office in Doha". According to the Financial Times, the proposal "alarmed" ILO staff, who published a resolution supported by nearly 80% of the 70 members surveyed. They warned that relocating to a country that bans trade unions and faces global scrutiny for its treatment of migrant workers risks "normalising weak labour standards"; could silence researchers, jeopardize independence, and legitimize weak labor standards. While Lebanon has also faced criticism for mistreatment of migrant workers, some staff members said that stricter government oversight in Qatar would make researchers "feel unsafe publishing reports critical of Gulf states while living there" and that the move "could pose serious risks to the independence of the ILO staff", and worried that "the ILO [would be] compromising its mandate" by moving.

==== Other contributions from the state of Qatar ====
Besides the funding of the ILO's mission within Qatar, the Qatari government as also contributed $2 million to the ILO's Regular Budget Supplementary Account (RBSA), a flexible funding mechanism, in May 2025. The ILO said that "the event marked not just the flow of funds, but a deliberate pivot toward deeper, longer-term cooperation between" the ILO and the Qatar Fund for Development, which is the government entity that provided the funding.

== See also ==
- Administrative Tribunal of the International Labour Organization
- Criticism of capitalism
- International Standard Classification of Occupations
- Labour theory of value
- League of Nations archives
- Seoul Declaration on Safety and Health at Work, 2008
- Social clause, the integration of seven core ILO labour rights conventions into trade agreements
- United Nations Global Compact, launched in 2000, encouraging businesses to adopt sustainable and socially responsible policies
