= Antony Page =

Canadian-American attorney and scholar

Dean of the Florida International University College of Law
- Incumbent
- Assumed office July 30, 2018
- Preceded by: Alexander Acosta

Personal details
- Born: Vancouver, Canada
- Education: McGill University (B. Comm.); Simon Fraser University (MBA); Stanford Law School (J.D.)
- Occupation: Law school dean, law professor

Antony G. Page is a Canadian-American attorney, scholar, and former diplomat who served as the third dean of the Florida International University College of Law from 2018 to 2025.

== Education and diplomatic career ==
Born in Vancouver to British parents, Page received a Bachelor of Communications degree from McGill University in 1988, followed by an MBA from Simon Fraser University in 1990. He was for several years a diplomat in the Canadian Foreign Service, in the Department of Foreign Affairs and International Trade. He later described how he began as a very junior diplomat, whose job duties included "carrying ministers' luggage around and making sure it got to the right place", but eventually served as "second secretary and vice consul in Thailand, Laos and Burma", and "as trade commissioner in the Asia-Pacific South Division, and as assistant trade commissioner in the European Union Trade and Economic Relations Division".

He received his J.D., with distinction, from Stanford Law School in 1997, where he was in the Order of the Coif. Page was a law clerk for Judge Harry Lindley Hupp of the United States District Court for the Central District of California, and for Judge Arthur Alarcón of the United States Court of Appeals for the Ninth Circuit. Page then worked for the law firm of Sullivan & Cromwell for several years, until his preference for academic research led him to pursue teaching.

== Academic career ==
In 2003, Page became a professor of law at the Indiana University Robert H. McKinney School of Law in Indianapolis, becoming vice dean of that institution in 2012 and serving in that capacity for six years. Page's 2005 law review article on peremptory challenges was cited by Justice Stephen Breyer in a case decided the same year, Miller-El v. Dretke. In 2014, Page criticized the inadequate internal controls of Ball State University following an incident in which that institution was defrauded of $8.1 million that had been invested in a recently formed Florida LLC. In 2015, he criticized as "suspicious" a deal allowing a large political donor to develop land on Lake Michigan that had been set aside for preservation. Page has written on the 1986 United States Supreme Court decision on jury selection in Batson v. Kentucky, and in 2019, Page praised the Supreme Court of Connecticut for a decision criticizing the "systematic removal of minority jurors".

Page was hired as the third Dean of the Florida International University College of Law, beginning as of July 30, 2018, and following Leonard Strickman and Alexander Acosta in that office. In August 2020, Page donated $200,000 to the law school to establish a scholarship for law students who are "among the first generation in their families to attend college", citing as a motivation the impact of having himself received a scholarship while studying at Stanford. In March 2022, Page was one of a number of signatories from academia of a letter encouraging members of the United States Senate to confirm Ketanji Brown Jackson to the Supreme Court of the United States. Under Page's deanship, the Florida International University College of Law surpassed its crosstown private rival, the University of Miami School of Law, in national rankings for the first time in their history.

Page stepped down as dean in May 2025, and returned to teaching as a professor of law.

== Publications ==
- Antony Page, "Preserving the Social Enterprise's Mission", in Benjamin Means and Joseph W. Yockey, eds., The Cambridge Handbook of Social Enterprise Law (Cambridge University Press, 2019)
- Antony Page and Robert Katz, "Is Social Enterprise the New Corporate Social Responsibility?", in Judd F. Sneirson and Nancy E. Shurtz, eds., Sustainability & Business Law (Carolina Academic Press, 2017)
- Antony Page, Revisiting the Causes of the Financial Crisis, 47 Ind. L. Rev. 37 (2014)
- Antony Page, New Corporate Forms and Green Business, 37 Wm. & Mary Envtl. L. & Pol'y Rev. 347 (2012-2013)
- Antony Page and Robert Katz, The Truth About Ben and Jerry's, Stanford Social Innovation Review, Vol. 10, No. 4, Fall 2012
- Antony Page and Robert Katz, Freezing out Ben & Jerry: Corporate Law and the Sale of a Social Enterprise Icon, 35 Vt. L. Rev. 211 (2010-2011)
- Antony Page, Unconscious Bias and the Limits of Director Independence, 2009 U. Ill. L. Rev. 237 (2009)
- Antony Page, Batson's Blind-Spot: Unconscious Stereotyping and the Peremptory Challenge, 85 B.U. L. Rev. 155 (2005)
