= Henry Latimer =

Henry Latimer is the name of:

- Henry Latimer (judge) (1938–2005), lawyer and judge from Florida
- Henry Latimer (politician) (1752–1819), physician and U.S. Senator from Delaware
