= Leiby =

Leiby is a surname. Notable people with the surname include:

- Jeanne M. Leiby (1964–2011), American teacher, writer and literary magazine editor
- Larry Leiby (born 1947), American attorney and arbitrator

== See also ==
- Jacob Leiby Farm was listed on the National Register of Historic Places in 1992
- Murder of Leiby Kletzky
