= Ocean Bank Convocation Center =

Home to the FIU Panthers basketball and volleyball teams

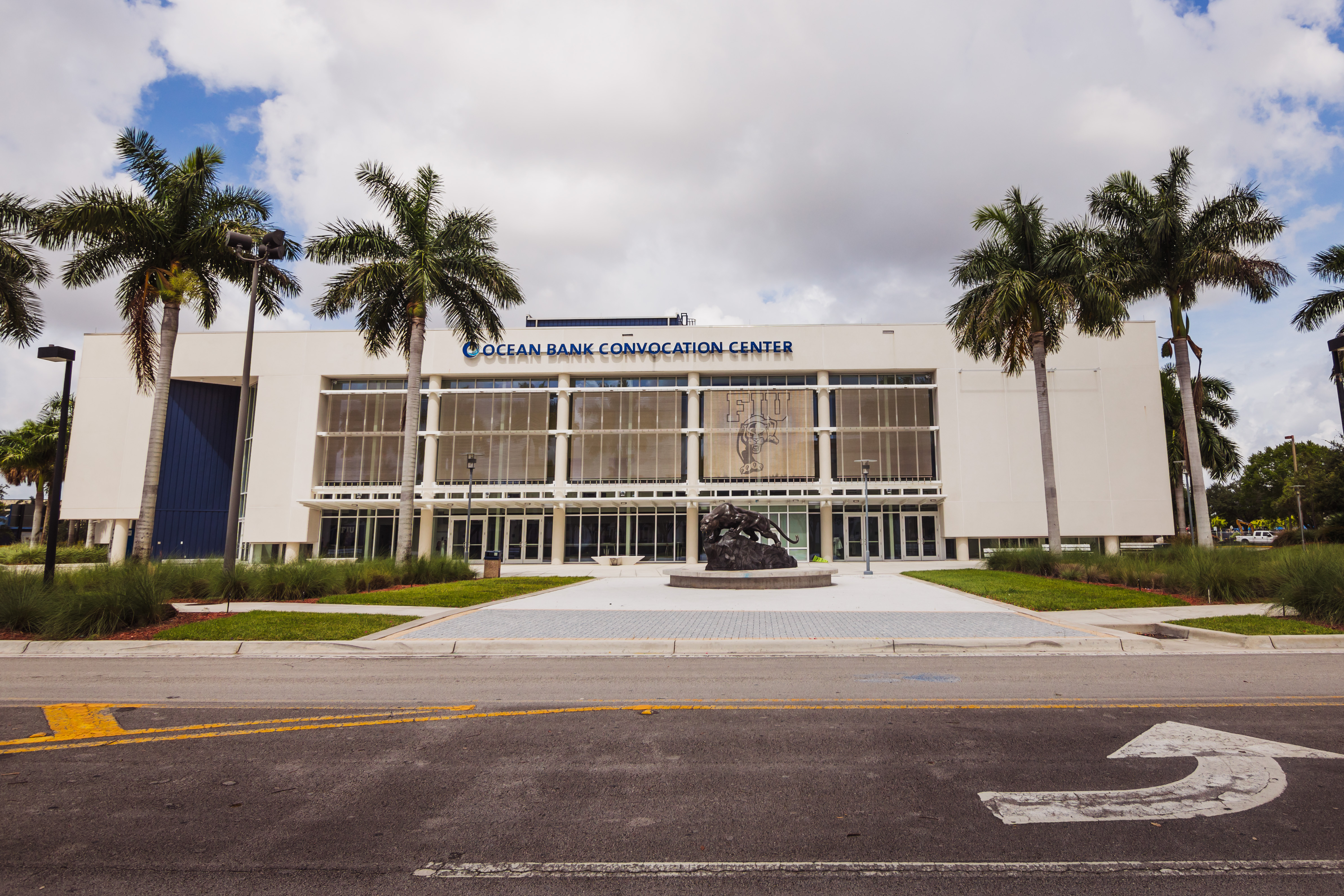
- Interactive map of Ocean Bank Convocation Center
- Former names: Sunblazer Arena (1986–87); Golden Panther Arena (1987–2004); Pharmed Arena (2004–08); FIU Arena (2008, 2014–18); U.S. Century Bank Arena (2008-14)
- Address: 11200 SW 8th St; Miami, Florida; 33199-2516
- Location: University Park, Florida
- Coordinates: 25°45′24″N 80°22′46″W
- Owner: Florida International University
- Capacity: 5,000
- Surface: Wood

Construction
- Groundbreaking: 1983
- Opened: February 1, 1986
- Cost: $7 million ($22.6 million in 2025 dollars)

Tenant
- FIU Panthers (NCAA) (1986–present)

Ocean Bank Convocation Center (formerly known as Sunblazer Arena, Golden Panther Arena, Pharmed Arena, U.S. Century Bank Arena, and FIU Arena) is a 5,000-seat multi-purpose arena at Florida International University (FIU) in University Park, Florida. It was opened on February 1, 1986, and is home to the FIU Panthers basketball and volleyball teams. It was originally named Sunblazer Arena, but was renamed Golden Panther Arena when FIU's athletic teams changed their nickname from Sunblazers to Golden Panthers in 1987. It was renamed Pharmed Arena in 2004, and then was briefly named FIU Arena in 2008 before being renamed to U.S. Century Bank Arena. The facility reverted to the FIU Arena name again from 2014 to 2018 before being renamed the Ocean Bank Convocation Center in 2018.

The 94,000-square-foot (8,700 m^{2}) arena contains a 19,000-square-foot (1,800 m^{2}) wooden arena floor. It is also used for banquets, conventions, concerts, trade shows, and graduations including FIU's own commencement ceremonies.

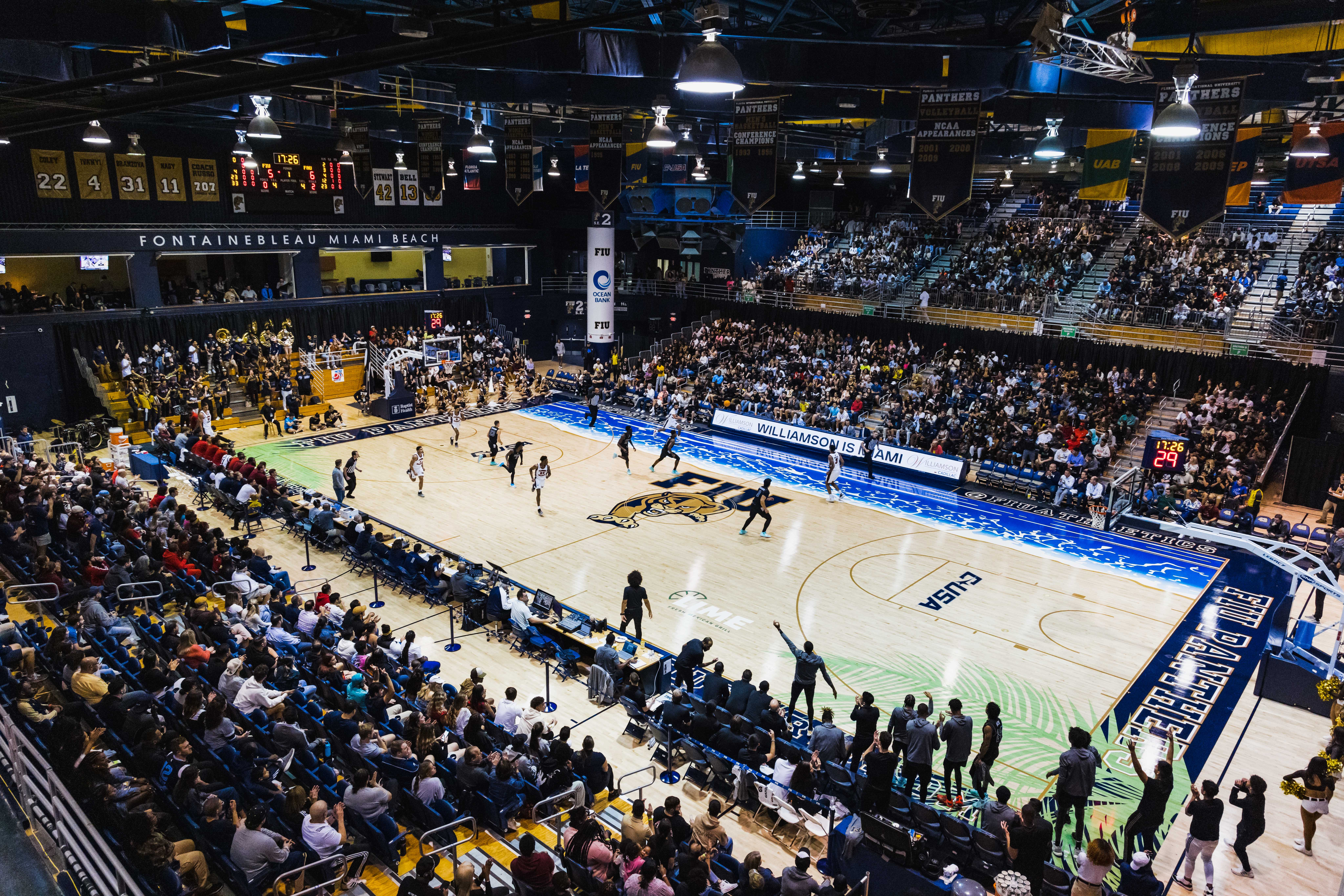
Ocean Bank Convocation Center during an FIU game against FAU.

The main court is a Cincinnati Robbins perma-cushion maple wood basketball floor, made up of some 19,000 square feet (1,800 m^{2}) of wood. Four retractable basketball backboards allow for the floor to be divided into two practice courts, while Hydra Goal II portable basketball standards are used for intercollegiate competition. Nevco scoreboards are found at either end.

Support areas include an equipment room, athletic training room, 876 lockers in six different, offices and boardrooms for FIU athletic administrators, and full-service dressing rooms. Academic space in the building includes three classrooms, as well as physiology and kinesiology laboratories.

In late 2008, U.S. Century Bank bought naming rights to the arena, changing the arena's name to U.S. Century Bank Arena. The arena was scheduled to undergo a $5 million renovation beginning in the summer or fall of 2010, with a completion date of early 2011.

In January 2015, the Ocean Bank Convocation Center hosted the Miss Universe 2014 pageant.

On January 26, 2019, the arena broke its attendance record for a basketball game with 4,710 spectators for a game between FIU and their local rivals Florida Atlantic.

== See also ==
- FIU Panthers
- Pitbull Stadium (FIU Football)
- FIU Baseball Stadium (FIU Baseball)
- List of NCAA Division I basketball arenas

Preceded by Crocus City Hall (Russia) Moscow	Miss Universe venue 2014	Succeeded by The AXIS (United States) Las Vegas
