= National Voices for Equality, Education and Enlightenment =

National Voices for Equality, Education and Enlightenment, Inc.
- Founded: 2009 in South Florida
- Type: 501(c)(3)
- Purpose: Bullying and Teen Suicide Prevention
- Location: 18001 Old Cutler Road, Miami, FL, US
- Method: Education, Workshops, National Campaigns
- Key people: Jowharah Sanders (Executive Director, Founder) Jeffrey Rubinstein, Esq. (Chairman of the Board, Founding Board Member); Jennifer Castillo (Founding Board Member); Jessica L. Saiontz, J.D. (Vice-Chairman, Founding Board Member); Ashley Colette Dadaglio (Founding Board Member); Crys Wilson (Founding Board Member); Arthur Johnson (Founding Board Member); Krystal HoSang, PharmD (Founding Board Member); Tara Austin (Founding Board Member) Charles Jones (PR, Board Member)
- Website: www.nveee.org

National Voices for Equality, Education and Enlightenment (NVEEE) is an American nonprofit organization that works to prevent bullying, violence, and suicide among youth, families and communities. NVEE programs include direct service, mentoring and prevention education.

Established in October 2009, NVEEE is headquartered in Miami, Florida.

== Description ==
NVEE has created partnerships with:

- University of Miami School of Education
- Florida International University College of Law
- Barry University School of Nursing
- Kids in Distress
- the YES Institute

NVEEE works prevent bullying and victimization, whether it is by peer-on-peer ignorance, bystanderism, or institutional intolerance.

The signature ‘Not on My Watch’ Pledge is a part of NVEEE's Anti-Bullying Campaign. Communities, students, teachers, community leaders, and politicians nationwide are asked to end school violence by refusing to be bystanders.
