= Ediberto Roman =

American law professor

Academic background
- Education: Lehman College (BA); University of Wisconsin–Madison (JD)

Academic work
- Discipline: Law
- Sub-discipline: Constitutional law Civil law Contracts law Immigration law
- Institutions: Florida International University; University of Miami; St. Thomas University

Ediberto Roman is an American legal scholar working as a professor of law at the Florida International University College of Law.

== Education ==
Roman graduated magna cum laude from Lehman College in 1985 with a Bachelor of Arts degree in business management. He received a Juris Doctor from the University of Wisconsin Law School in 1988.

== Career ==
After practicing at several New York City law firms from 1988 to 1995, he entered legal academia as a professor at the St. Thomas University School of Law. He became a founding member of the faculty of the Florida International University College of Law in 2002. In August 2006, he was selected to chair the Hispanic National Bar Association section on the Legal Academy. He also taught at the University of Miami School of Law.

The author of several law review articles, Roman also wrote The Other American Colonies: An International and Constitutional Law Examination of The United States' Nineteenth and Twentieth Century Island Conquests (Carolina Academic Press, 2005), which was nominated for the Law & Society Association's James Willard Hurst Prize for Best Work in Legal History.

In addition to his recognition as a professor of law and writer, he is a student of martial arts and a member of the American Taekwondo Association.
