= John F. Stack =

Professor of politics, international relations, and law (1950–2022)

John F. Stack Jr. (July 8, 1950 – June 23, 2022) was an American professor of politics, international relations, and law at Florida International University, where he held a joint appointment as founding dean of the Steven J. Green School of International and Public Affairs, and as a professor of law at the Florida International University College of Law.

Originally from Brockton, Massachusetts, and later a Bostonian, Stack received an A.B. with highest honors graduated from Stonehill College in Easton, Massachusetts in 1972, followed by an M.A. from the Graduate School of International Studies of the University of Denver in 1974, and a Ph.D. from the same institution in 1977. He received a J.D. from the University of Miami School of Law, in 1989.

In 1976, Stack moved to South Florida and became one of the first instructors in the Florida International University Department of Political Science, thereafter becoming a full professor and department chair. He chaired the effort to develop the FIU College of Law from 2000 to 2001, and became a member of the law faculty from the initiation of the law school in 2002, serving until his death. In 2010, Stack was one of two FIU professors who signed a letter asking FIU employees to donate to the congressional campaign of Republican David Rivera, who was lauded in the letter for support for FIU. The letter drew a response from the university's provost reminding employees to avoid using public resources for political activities. Stack was also the faculty advisor to the FIU Model United Nations team, which was named first in the country in 2019.

Stack died on June 23, 2022, at the age of 71. Among those remarking on Stack's death was Senator Marco Rubio, who had also taught at FIU. Stack was interred in Doral, Florida.

== Publications ==
Stack was an author or coauthor of 13 books, including:

- Globalization: Debunking the Myths (with Lui Hebron; 2016)
- Courts and Terrorism: Nine Nations Balance Rights and Security (with Mary L. Volcansek; 2010)
- The New Deal in South Florida: Design, Policy, and Community Building, 1933–1940 (with John A. Stuart; 2008)
- At War with Civil Rights and Civil Liberties (editor with Thomas E. Baker; Rowman & Littlefield Publishers 2006)
- Congress Confronts the Court: The Struggle for Legitimacy and Authority in Lawmaking (with C.C. Campbell; 2002)
- The International Politics of Quebec Secession (with D. Carment and F. Harvey; 2001)
- The Ethnic Entanglement: Conflict and Intervention in World Politics (with Lui Hebron; 1999)
- International Conflict in an American City: Boston's Irish, Italians, and Jews, 1935-1944 (1979)
