= Alexander Acosta =

American attorney and politician (born 1969)

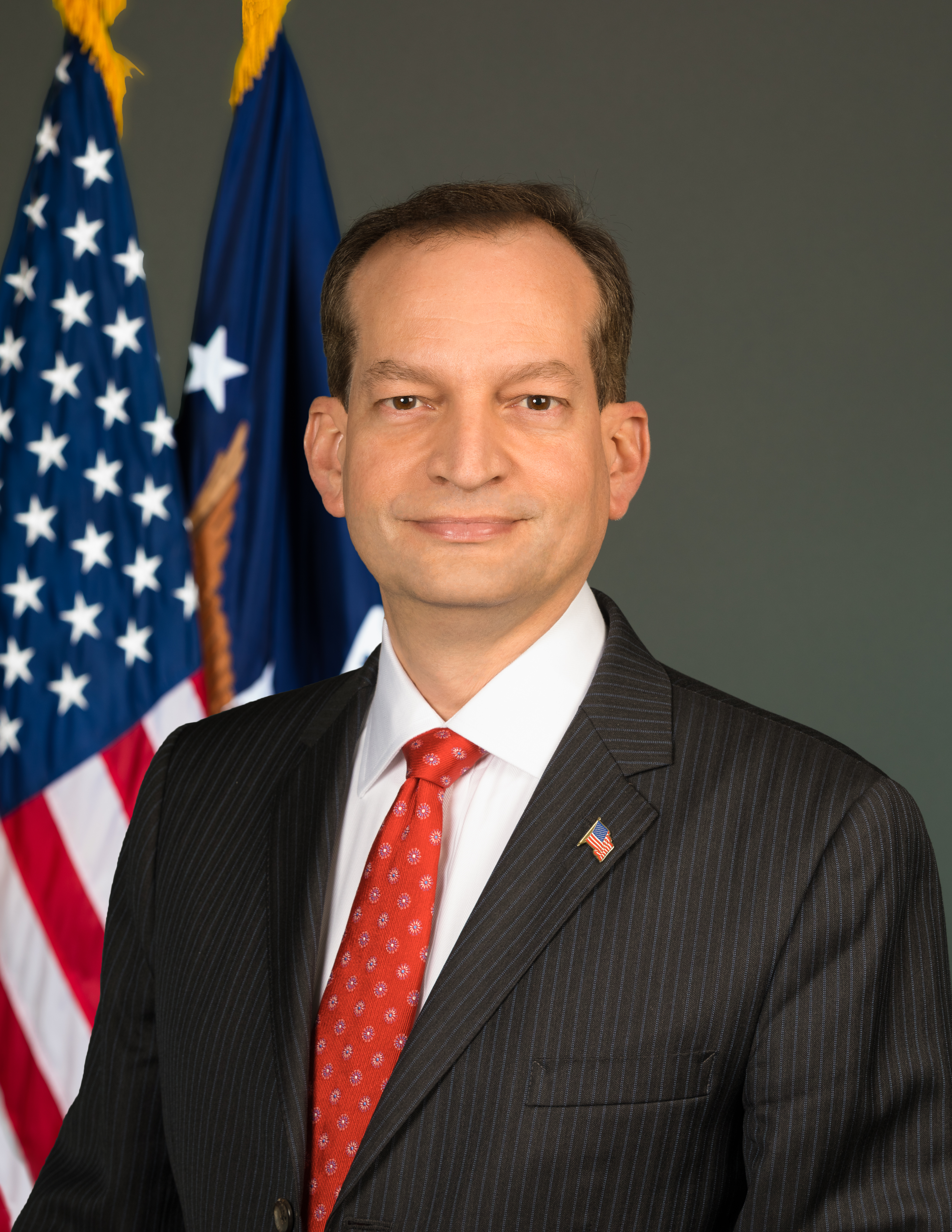
- Official portrait, 2017

27th United States Secretary of Labor
- In office April 28, 2017 – July 19, 2019
- President: Donald Trump
- Deputy: Patrick Pizzella
- Preceded by: Tom Perez
- Succeeded by: Eugene Scalia

Dean of the Florida International University College of Law
- In office July 1, 2009 – April 28, 2017
- Preceded by: Leonard Strickman
- Succeeded by: Antony Page

United States Attorney for the Southern District of Florida
- In office June 11, 2005 – June 5, 2009
- President: George W. Bush
- Preceded by: Marcos Jiménez
- Succeeded by: Wifredo A. Ferrer

United States Assistant Attorney General for the Civil Rights Division
- In office August 22, 2003 – June 11, 2005
- President: George W. Bush
- Preceded by: Bradley Schlozman (acting)
- Succeeded by: Wan J. Kim

Member of the National Labor Relations Board
- In office December 17, 2002 – August 21, 2003
- President: George W. Bush
- Preceded by: William Cowen
- Succeeded by: Ronald Meisburg

Personal details
- Born: Rene Alexander Acosta; January 16, 1969 (age 57) Miami, Florida, U.S.
- Party: Republican
- Spouse: Jan Williams
- Education: Harvard University (BA, JD)

Rene Alexander Acosta (born January 16, 1969) is an American lawyer and government official who served as the 27th United States secretary of labor from 2017 to 2019 during the first presidency of Donald Trump. A member of the Republican Party, Acosta had previously served as a member of the National Labor Relations Board, Assistant Attorney General for the Civil Rights Division of the U.S. Department of Justice, and United States Attorney for the Southern District of Florida. He had also served as dean of the Florida International University College of Law.

As the U.S. Attorney for the Southern District of Florida in 2007–08, Acosta oversaw a federal investigation into possible sex trafficking crimes by financier Jeffrey Epstein that resulted in a non-prosecution agreement under which Epstein pleaded guilty to prostitution-related charges under Florida state law and received only a 13-month prison sentence. The agreement, which granted immunity from federal prosecution and extended immunity to potential co-conspirators, drew renewed scrutiny in 2019 after Epstein’s arrest in New York on federal sex trafficking charges. Acosta defended the agreement as a strategic decision to secure a conviction amid concerns about trial risk, but it was widely criticized as unusually lenient. Facing bipartisan criticism, Acosta resigned as Secretary of Labor in July 2019.

After leaving public office, Acosta entered the private sector and in March 2025 joined the board of directors of Newsmax, where he chairs the audit committee.

== Early life and education ==
Acosta was born on January 16, 1969, in Miami, the only son of Cuban immigrants. He grew up in Miami, where he attended the Gulliver Schools. He earned a Bachelor of Arts degree in economics from Harvard University in 1990, becoming the first member of his family to graduate from university. He then attended Harvard Law School, where he was a member of the Harvard Latino Law Review and graduated in 1994 with a Juris Doctor, cum laude.

== Early career (1994–2001) ==
After law school, Acosta was a law clerk to Samuel Alito, then a judge of the U.S. Court of Appeals for the Third Circuit, from 1994 to 1995. He then entered private practice as an associate in the Washington, D.C. office of Kirkland & Ellis, where he specialized in labor and employment matters. While in Washington, Acosta taught classes on employment law, disability-based discrimination law, and civil rights law at the George Mason University School of Law. Acosta was a member of the Board of Trustees of Gulliver Schools, where he served a past term as board chairman.

== George W. Bush administration (2001–2005) ==
Acosta served in four presidentially appointed, U.S. Senate-confirmed positions in the George W. Bush administration. From December 2001 to December 2002, he served as Principal Deputy Assistant Attorney General in the Civil Rights Division of the U.S. Department of Justice. From December 2002 to August 2003, he was a member of the National Labor Relations Board for which he participated in or authored more than 125 opinions.

Then, he became Assistant Attorney General for the Civil Rights Division on August 22, 2003, where he was known for increasing federal prosecutions against human trafficking. Acosta authorized Federal intervention in an Oklahoma religious liberties case to help assure the right to wear hijab in public school, and worked with Mississippi authorities to reopen the investigation of the 1955 murder of Emmett Till, a 14-year-old black youth whose abduction and murder helped spark the civil rights movement. He was the first Hispanic to serve as Assistant Attorney General.

While leading the Civil Rights Division, Acosta allowed his predecessor, Bradley Schlozman, to continue to make decisions on hiring. A report by the inspector general and the Office of Professional Responsibility later found that Schlozman illegally gave preferential treatment to conservatives and made false statements to the Senate Judiciary Committee. Those findings were relayed to the office of the U.S. attorney for the District of Columbia, but Schlozman was not prosecuted. While it put the primary responsibility on Schlozman, the report also concluded that Acosta "did not sufficiently supervise Schlozman" and that "in light of indications [he and Principal Deputy Assistant Attorney General Sheldon Bradshaw] had about Schlozman's conduct and judgment, they failed to ensure that Schlozman's hiring and personnel decisions were based on proper considerations."

== U.S. attorney for Southern District of Florida (2005–2009) ==
In 2005, Acosta was appointed U.S. Attorney for the Southern District of Florida, where his office successfully prosecuted the lobbyist Jack Abramoff, the terrorism suspect José Padilla, the founders of the Cali Cartel, and Charles McArther Emmanuel, the son of Liberia's former leader. The district also targeted white collar crime, prosecuting several bank-related cases, including one against Swiss bank UBS. The case resulted in UBS paying $780 million in fines, and for the first time in history, the bank provided the United States with the names of individuals who were using secret Swiss bank accounts to avoid U.S. federal income taxes.

Other notable cases during his tenure include the corruption prosecution of Palm Beach County Commission chairman Tony Masilotti, Palm Beach County commissioner Warren Newell, Palm Beach County commissioner Mary McCarty, and Broward sheriff Ken Jenne; the conviction of Cali Cartel founders Miguel and Gilberto Rodríguez Orejuela, for the importation of 200,000 kilos of cocaine, which resulted in a $2.1 billion forfeiture; and the white-collar crime prosecutions of executives connected to Hamilton Bank. Acosta also emphasized health care fraud prosecutions. Under Acosta's leadership the district prosecuted more than 700 individuals, responsible for a total of more than $2 billion in Medicare fraud.

=== Jeffrey Epstein case ===
In August 2007, Acosta's office entered into negotiations with Jeffrey Epstein about a plea agreement. On September 24, 2007, Epstein signed a non-prosecution agreement, a day before the prosecutor in the case was prepared to indict him. Over the subsequent months, Epstein sought to negotiate the terms of the agreement and pressured Acosta to remove Marie Villafaña, the prosecutor on the case. In 2008, as U.S. attorney, Acosta approved a federal non-prosecution agreement, a secret agreement that would later be unsuccessfully challenged in court for violating the Crime Victims' Rights Act and was cited as a defense in the case of Ghislaine Maxwell, with Epstein.

==== Source of controversy ====
In March 2005, the Palm Beach Police Department began a 13-month undercover investigation of Epstein, including a search of his home, based on reports that he was involved with sex trafficking of minors. Federal Bureau of Investigation (FBI) investigation resulted in a 53-page indictment in June 2007. Acosta, who was the U.S. attorney for the Southern District of Florida, agreed to a plea deal, to grant immunity from all federal criminal charges to Epstein, along with four named co-conspirators and any unnamed "potential co-conspirators". That agreement "essentially shut down an ongoing FBI probe into whether there were more victims and other powerful people who took part in Epstein's sex crimes". At the time, this halted the investigation and sealed the indictment.

==== Renewed interest ====
In 2017, Acosta was nominated for U.S. Secretary of Labor by Donald Trump. His handling of the Epstein case was discussed as part of his confirmation hearing. On November 28, 2018, as rumors circulated that Acosta was being considered as a possible successor to Attorney General Jeff Sessions, the Miami Herald published an investigation detailing Acosta's role in the Epstein case. That story revealed the extent of collaboration between federal prosecutors and Epstein's attorneys in their efforts to keep victims from learning of the plea deal. The Miami Herald described an email from Epstein's attorney after his off-site meeting with Acosta: "'Thank you for the commitment you made to me during our Oct. 12 meeting,' Lefkowitz wrote in a letter to Acosta after their breakfast meeting in West Palm Beach. He added that he was hopeful that Acosta would abide by a promise to keep the deal confidential. 'You ... assured me that your office would not ... contact any of the identified individuals, potential witnesses or potential civil claimants and the respective counsel in this matter,' Lefkowitz wrote."

The Miami Herald also reported that certain aspects of Acosta's non-prosecution agreement violated federal law, stating: "As part of the arrangement, Acosta agreed, despite a federal law to the contrary, that the deal would be kept from the victims. As a result, the non-prosecution agreement was sealed until after it was approved by the judge, thereby averting any chance that the girls—or anyone else—might show up in court and try to derail it." Victims, former prosecutors, and the retired Palm Beach police chief were among those quoted criticizing the agreement and Acosta's role in it.

==== Victims' rights violation ====
On February 21, 2019, a ruling in federal court returned Acosta's role in the Epstein case to the headlines. The decision to keep the deal with Epstein secret until after it was finalized was found to be a violation of the Crime Victims' Rights Act of 2004 (CVRA), which requires notifying victims of the progress of federal criminal cases. The CVRA was new and relatively untested at the time of the Epstein non-prosecution agreement. In 2008, representatives for two of Epstein's victims filed a lawsuit (Jane Doe #1 and Jane Doe #2 v US) in federal court aiming to vacate the federal non-prosecution agreement on the grounds that it violated the CVRA. For more than a decade, the U.S. Attorney's office denied that it acted in violation of victims' rights laws and argued that the CVRA did not apply in the Epstein case.

The government's contention that the CVRA did not apply was based on questions of timing (whether or not CVRA applied prior to filing of federal charges), relevance (whether the CVRA applied to non-prosecution agreements), and jurisdiction (whether the case should be considered a federal case or a state case under the CVRA). U.S. District Judge Kenneth Marra rejected those arguments in the February 21, 2019 ruling, finding that the CVRA did in fact apply and that victims should have been notified of the Epstein non-prosecution agreement in advance of its signing, to afford them the opportunity to influence its terms. At the conclusion of his ruling, the federal judge in the case noted that he was "not ruling that the decision not to prosecute was improper", but was "simply ruling that, under the facts of this case, there was a violation of the victims rights [for reasonable, accurate, and timely notice] under the CVRA."

The Eleventh Circuit affirmed Marra's decision, but then sitting en banc revisited that decision and ruled otherwise, in Doe No. 1 v. United States, 749 F. 3d 999 (11th Cir. 2021) and in February 2022 the Roberts Supreme Court decided to let that judgment rest. The court found that the CVRA did not create a right for victims to sue the US government if no indictment was actually filed. Following the Herald investigation and related news coverage, a group of 15 Democratic members of Congress submitted a formal request to the U.S. Department of Justice for review of Acosta's role in the Epstein deal, and several editorials called for Acosta's resignation or termination from his then-current position as U.S. Labor Secretary. In February 2019, the Justice Department's Office of Professional Responsibility notified Senator Ben Sasse that it had opened an investigation into Epstein's prosecution.

==== Epstein's arrest, Acosta's resignation and OPR review ====
On July 6, 2019, Epstein was arrested by the FBI–NYPD Crimes Against Children Task Force on sex trafficking charges stemming from activities alleged to have occurred in 2002–2005. Amid criticism of his mishandling of the Epstein case, Acosta resigned his role as Secretary of Labor effective July 19, 2019, after a public outcry. An anonymous source claimed that when Acosta was vetted for his cabinet post in the Trump administration, he stated "I was told Epstein 'belonged to intelligence' and to leave it alone."

According to an internal review conducted by the Department of Justice's Office of Professional Responsibility (OPR), which was released in November 2020, Acosta showed "poor judgment" in granting Epstein a non-prosecution agreement and failing to notify Epstein's alleged victims about this agreement. In the report, Acosta denied that Epstein was an intelligence asset. The OPR report also stated that it found no evidence that Epstein was a cooperating witness or an intelligence asset.

James Hill of ABC News remarks that in "an appendix to the report, OPR revealed there was an 11-month gap in Acosta's incoming emails that coincided with the time frame of the Epstein investigation and negotiations over the deal. ... After being informed of the "data gap" at a briefing for victims and their attorneys last week, Cassell [Paul Cassell, a representative for Epstein's accusers] said he was stunned, because he and his co-counsel Edwards have been seeking those emails for several years in their litigation on behalf of the victims, and they had never been told about the issue." According to Hill, Cassell also questioned why they had not been told years earlier.

==== 2025 congressional testimony subpoena ====
On 25 August 2025 the House Oversight Committee issued a subpoena to Acosta requesting his testimony in the Epstein file. His name was not in the initial batch of subpoenas the committee sent out in August, which included Bill Clinton and Hillary Clinton. His testimony was on September 19. During his September 2025 testimony, Acosta said he did not recall any discussions of "potential financial crimes" in the Epstein investigation. In October 2025, Bloomberg News uncovered email correspondence that showed that Acosta's office did discuss financial crimes and that Acosta was copied on correspondence about it. Records related to the financial crimes investigation were stored in a folder titled, "Money Laundering."

== Law school dean and bank chairman (2009–2017) ==
On July 1, 2009, Acosta became the second dean of Florida International University College of Law. He spearheaded the effort to establish the Master of Studies in Law in banking compliance, Bank Secrecy Act and anti-money-laundering at FIU Law. On December 31, 2013, Acosta became the new chairman of U.S. Century Bank, the largest domestically owned Hispanic community bank in Florida and one of the 15 largest Hispanic community banks in the country. During his tenure as chairman, U.S. Century Bank had its first year-end profit since the start of the Great Recession.

== Secretary of Labor (2017–2019) ==
=== Nomination, recognition and confirmation ===
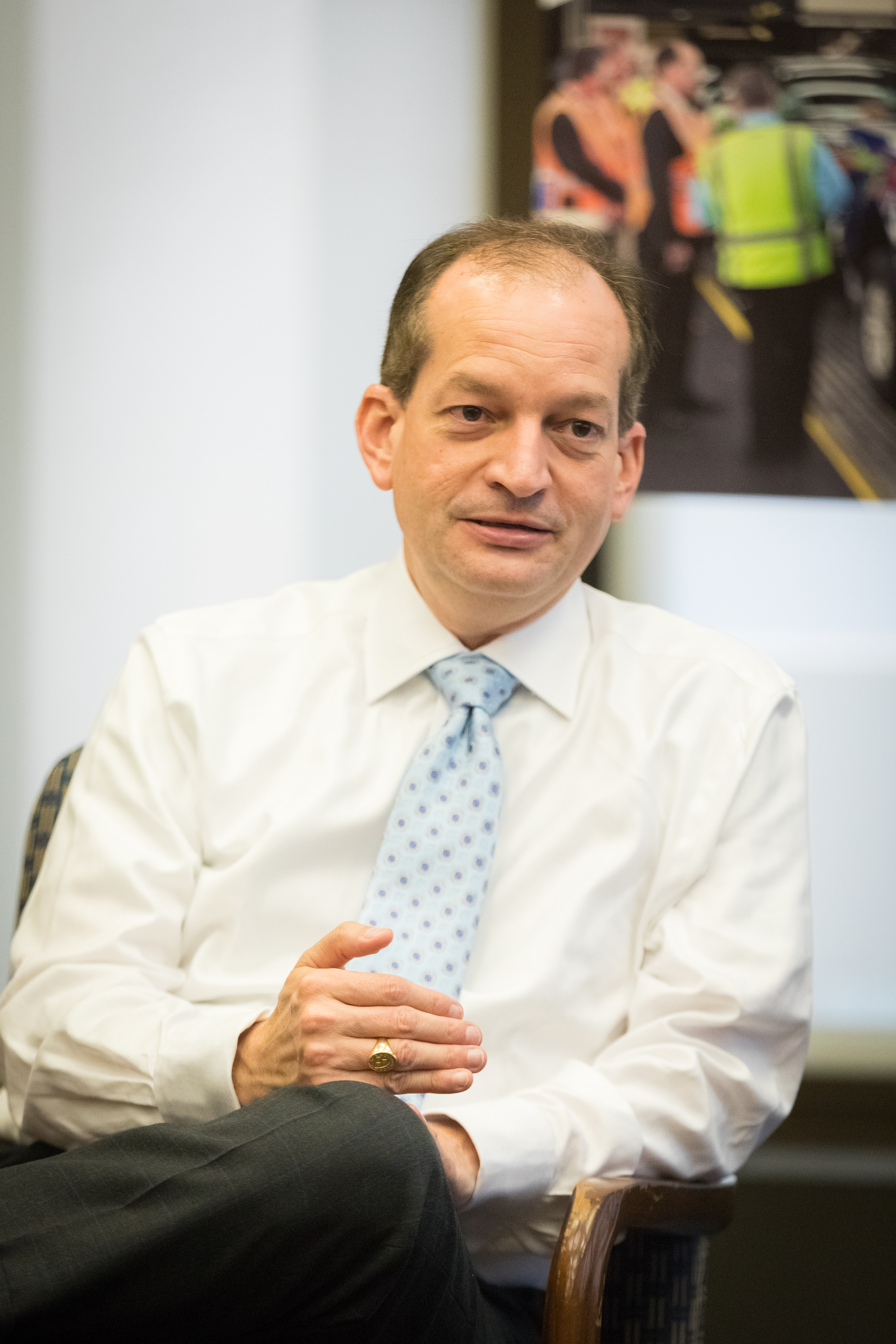
Acosta meeting with apprentice program participants as the secretary of labor

President Donald Trump announced in a press conference on February 16, 2017, that he would nominate Acosta to fill the position of Secretary of Labor after the nomination of Andrew Puzder was withdrawn. Acosta was recommended by White House counsel Don McGahn.

Acosta has twice been named one of the nation's 50 most influential Hispanics by Hispanic Business Magazine. He serves or served on the Florida Innocence Commission, on the Florida Supreme Court's Commission on Professionalism, Florida Supreme Court's Access to Justice Commission, and on the Commission for Hispanic Rights and Responsibilities.

The Senate Committee on Health, Education, Labor and Pensions held confirmation hearings on March 22, 2017, and Acosta's nomination was reported out of the committee on March 30, 2017. On April 27, 2017, Acosta was confirmed as Secretary of Labor by the U.S. Senate in a 60–38 vote. He received the support of eight Democratic Senators and all Republican senators except Senator Pat Toomey, who did not participate in the vote. On April 28, 2017, Acosta was sworn in by Vice President Mike Pence.

=== Tenure ===
In 2019, Acosta proposed cutting the funding of his department's International Labor Affairs Bureau from $68 million in 2018 to under $20 million in 2020. That agency combats human trafficking (including child sex trafficking), child labor and forced labor internationally.

During Acosta's confirmation hearing, he discussed the need and his support of apprenticeship as a workforce development tool to close the skills gap. On June 15, 2017, President Trump signed Executive Order 13801, "Presidential Executive Order Expanding Apprenticeships in America", establishing the Task Force on Apprenticeship Expansion with Acosta serving as the chair. The task force held five public meetings and issued their final report to President Trump on May 10, 2018. Following the task force final report, the U.S. Department of Labor announced the following initiatives to expand and promote apprenticeship opportunities:

- Create a new industry-recognized apprenticeship program system to complement the registered apprenticeship system.
- Launch Apprenticeship.gov as a "one-stop source for all things apprenticeship."

Acosta announced that the Trump administration maintained a goal of one million new apprentices. Following Jeffrey Epstein's arrest in July 2019, on sex trafficking charges, Alexander Acosta faced fresh calls to resign. He resigned as Secretary of Labor effective July 19, 2019. President Trump, standing next to Acosta, said he would have been willing to have him remain. Trump said "This was him, not me" and called him a "great, great secretary".

== Later career ==
Since March of 2025, Acosta has been a member of the board of directors of Newsmax, a cable company based in Boca Raton, Florida. He serves as its Audit Committee chair. Acosta chairs the board of the State Leadership Initiative (SLI), a U.S.-based nonprofit that builds coalitions in Republican-led states to advance governance reforms focused on economic dynamism and institutional strength. SLI organizes business and civic leaders to advocate for policies that reduce bureaucratic and regulatory burdens while enhancing state competitiveness and self-governance. Noah Wall and Nate Fischer founded the organization. Board members include Ed Corrigan, former vice president for policy promotion at the Heritage Foundation, and Kevin Roberts, the Heritage Foundation's president. SLI published a study examining how national professional associations and nonpartisan policy groups influence state agencies. The study argued that these organizations were driving the implementation of progressive policies in Republican-led states.

Legal offices
Preceded by Bradley Schlozman; Acting	United States Assistant Attorney General for the Civil Rights Division; 2003–2005	Succeeded by Wan J. Kim
Preceded by Marcos Jiménez	United States Attorney for the Southern District of Florida; 2005–2009	Succeeded by Wifredo A. Ferrer
Academic offices
Preceded by Leonard Strickman	Dean of the Florida International University College of Law; 2009–2017	Succeeded by Tawia Ansah; Acting
Political offices
Preceded by Tom Perez	United States Secretary of Labor; 2017–2019	Succeeded by Eugene Scalia
U.S. order of precedence (ceremonial)
Preceded by Sonny Perdue as Former U.S. Cabinet Member	Order of precedence of the United States as Former U.S. Cabinet Member	Succeeded by Kirstjen Nielsen as Former U.S. Cabinet Member
