= Wan J. Kim =

American attorney and former government official

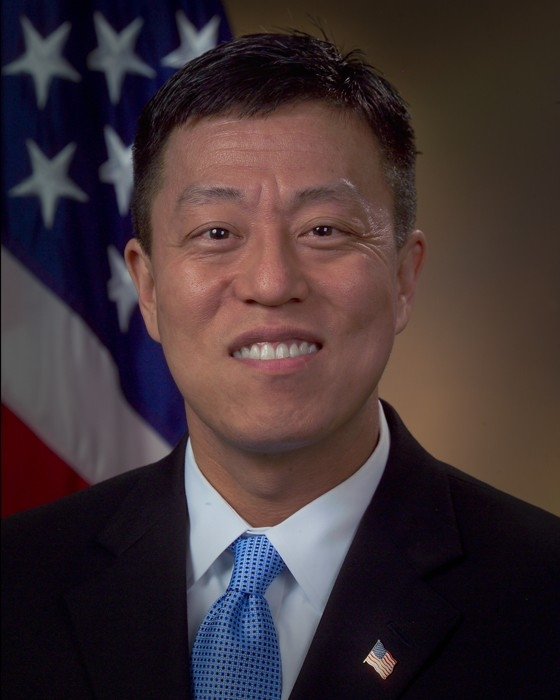
- Official portrait, 2005

Assistant United States Attorney General for the Civil Rights Division
- In office November 9, 2005 – August 31, 2007
- President: George W. Bush
- Preceded by: Alexander Acosta
- Succeeded by: Tom Perez

Personal details
- Born: Seoul, South Korea
- Education: Johns Hopkins University (B.A.); University of Chicago (J.D.)
- Occupation: Attorney

- Wan J. Kim
- Hangul: 김완주
- RR: Gim Wanju
- MR: Kim Wanju

Wan J. Kim (born 1968) is an American attorney and former government official who served as Assistant United States Attorney General for the Civil Rights Division in the Department of Justice from November 9, 2005, to August 31, 2007. Born in Seoul, South Korea, Kim is the first immigrant to serve as Assistant Attorney General for the Civil Rights Division of the United States Department of Justice, and is the first Korean American ever to become an Assistant Attorney General. On August 23, 2007, Kim announced that he was leaving the agency for the private sector.

== Early life ==
Kim was born in Seoul, South Korea to father Kim Hak-su and mother Yu Chun-ja. He emigrated to the United States in 1973 at the age of 5, joining his parents who had moved there two years earlier. They moved to Union, New Jersey, where Kim attended Roselle Catholic High School, from which he graduated in 1986. Kim graduated Phi Beta Kappa and with departmental honors in Economics from the Johns Hopkins University. He then attended the University of Chicago Law School, where he was an Associate Editor of the Law Review.

== Career ==
Kim previously served as an enlisted soldier and a rifle platoon leader in the United States Army Reserve. He also worked on the staff of the Senate Judiciary Committee for former Chairman Orrin G. Hatch, and as a law clerk to Judge James L. Buckley of the U.S. Court of Appeals for the District of Columbia Circuit.

Kim has spent most of his legal career at the Department of Justice, having entered through the Attorney General's Honors Program as a Trial Attorney in the Criminal Division. While at the Department of Justice, Kim was a trial attorney in the Terrorism and Violent Crime Section of the Criminal Division, and then a Special Attorney to the Attorney General in the prosecution of Timothy McVeigh and Terry Nichols for the bombing of the Alfred P. Murrah Federal Building in Oklahoma City, Oklahoma. After two years in private practice, Kim returned to the Department of Justice as an Assistant United States Attorney for the District of Columbia, where he investigated and prosecuted a wide range of criminal matters. He joined the Civil Rights Division in August 2003. Immediately prior to his nomination, Kim served as a Deputy Assistant Attorney General in the Civil Rights Division.

Legal offices
Preceded by Alex Acosta	Assistant Attorney General for Civil Rights; 2005–2007	Succeeded by Tom Perez
