= Tom Perez =

American politician and attorney (born 1961)

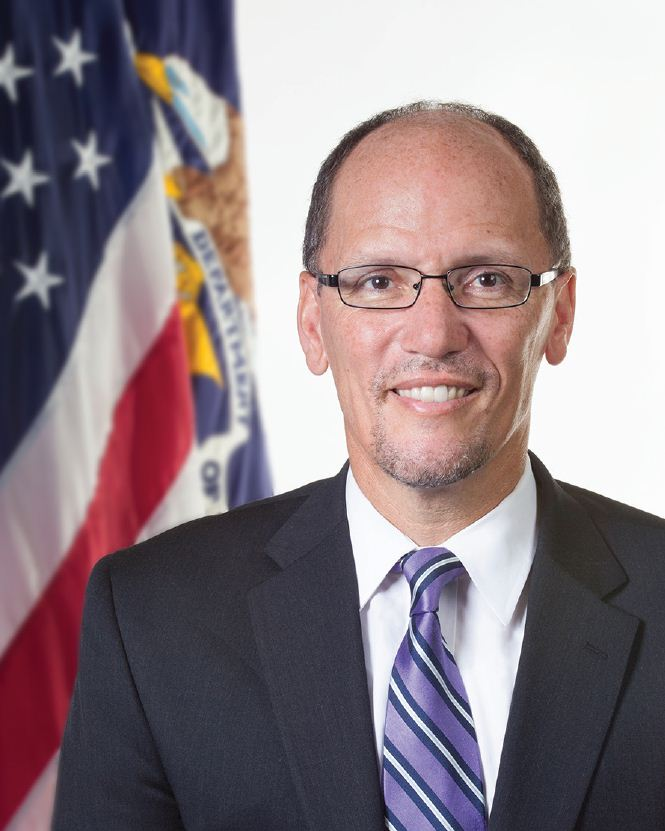
- Official portrait, 2013

Senior Advisor to the President
- In office June 12, 2023 – January 20, 2025
- President: Joe Biden
- Preceded by: Julie Rodriguez
- Succeeded by: Elon Musk; Massad Boulos

Director of the White House Office of Intergovernmental Affairs
- In office June 12, 2023 – January 20, 2025
- President: Joe Biden
- Deputy: Daniel Koh
- Preceded by: Julie Chavez Rodriguez
- Succeeded by: Alex Meyer

Chair of the Democratic National Committee
- In office February 24, 2017 – January 21, 2021
- Deputy: Keith Ellison (2017–2018)
- Preceded by: Debbie Wasserman Schultz
- Succeeded by: Jaime Harrison

26th United States Secretary of Labor
- In office July 23, 2013 – January 20, 2017
- President: Barack Obama
- Deputy: Seth Harris; Chris Lu
- Preceded by: Hilda Solis
- Succeeded by: Alexander Acosta

United States Assistant Attorney General for the Civil Rights Division
- In office October 8, 2009 – July 23, 2013
- President: Barack Obama
- Preceded by: Wan J. Kim
- Succeeded by: Jocelyn Samuels (acting)

Secretary of the Maryland Department of Labor, Licensing and Regulation
- In office March 15, 2007 – October 7, 2009
- Governor: Martin O'Malley
- Preceded by: James Fielder
- Succeeded by: Alexander Sanchez

Member of the Montgomery County Council from the 5th district
- In office December 10, 2002 – December 10, 2006
- Preceded by: Donell Peterman
- Succeeded by: Valerie Ervin

Personal details
- Born: Thomas Edward Perez; October 7, 1961 (age 65) Buffalo, New York, U.S.
- Party: Democratic
- Spouse: Ann Staudenmaier
- Children: 3
- Education: Brown University (BA); Harvard University (JD, MPP)
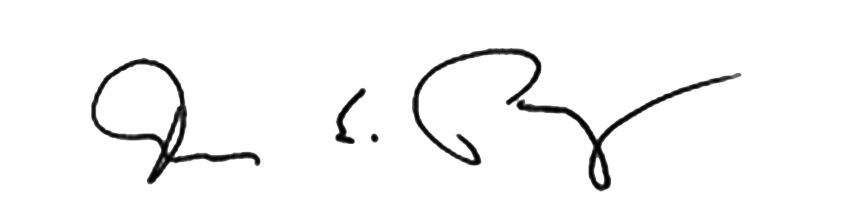
- Signature

Thomas Edward Perez (born October 7, 1961) is an American politician and attorney who served as the senior advisor to President Joe Biden and the director of the White House Office of Intergovernmental Affairs from 2023 to 2025. Perez previously served as the United States secretary of labor from 2013 to 2017, the chair of the Democratic National Committee from 2017 to 2021, and U.S. Assistant Attorney General for Civil Rights from 2009 to 2013.

Born in Buffalo, New York, Perez is a graduate of Brown University, Harvard Law School, and the John F. Kennedy School of Government. After clerking for Judge Zita Weinshienk in Colorado, Perez served as a federal civil rights prosecutor for the Department of Justice, a staffer for Senator Ted Kennedy, and, in the final years of the Clinton administration, as the director of the Office for Civil Rights at the Department of Health and Human Services. Perez was elected to the Montgomery County (Maryland) Council in 2002, serving as the council's president from 2005 until the end of his tenure in 2006. He attempted to run for the Democratic nomination for attorney general of Maryland, but was disqualified for having insufficient time as a member of the Maryland state bar. In January 2007. Perez was appointed by Maryland governor Martin O'Malley as secretary of the Maryland Department of Labor, Licensing and Regulation.

In October 2009, Perez was nominated by President Barack Obama and confirmed by the United States Senate as assistant attorney general. In 2013, Perez was nominated by President Obama and confirmed by the United States Senate to be the United States Secretary of Labor.

After the 2016 United States elections, Perez announced his candidacy for chair of the Democratic National Committee in the 2017 party election. After a tight race against Keith Ellison, Perez was elected chairman on the second ballot; he appointed Ellison as deputy chair. Perez declined to run for re-election as chair in 2021. Perez was a GU Politics Fellow at the Georgetown Institute of Politics and Public Service in 2021. Perez then ran for the Democratic nomination in the 2022 Maryland gubernatorial election, but lost to Baltimore author Wes Moore in the Democratic primary. He joined the Biden administration in June 2023 as Senior Advisor to the President, serving until Biden's term ended on January 20, 2025.

== Early life and education ==
Thomas Edward Perez was born and raised in Buffalo, New York, to parents Grace (née Altagracia Brache Bernard) and Dr. Rafael Antonio de Jesús Pérez Lara, who had immigrated from the Dominican Republic.

His father, who earned American citizenship after enlisting in the United States Army after World War II, worked as a doctor in Atlanta, Georgia, before moving to Buffalo, where he worked as a physician at a Veterans Affairs hospital.

His mother, Grace, came to the United States in 1930 after her father, Rafael Brache, was appointed as the Dominican Republic's Ambassador to the United States. Brache was initially an ally of Dominican dictator Rafael Trujillo, but after disagreements with the regime, he was declared an enemy of the state, forcing him and his family to remain in the United States.

Perez is the youngest of five brothers and sisters, all of whom but Perez followed their father in becoming physicians. His father died of a heart attack when Perez was 12 years old. He attended Christ the King in Amherst, New York until the 8th Grade. Perez graduated from Canisius High School, an all boys Jesuit school in Buffalo, in 1979.

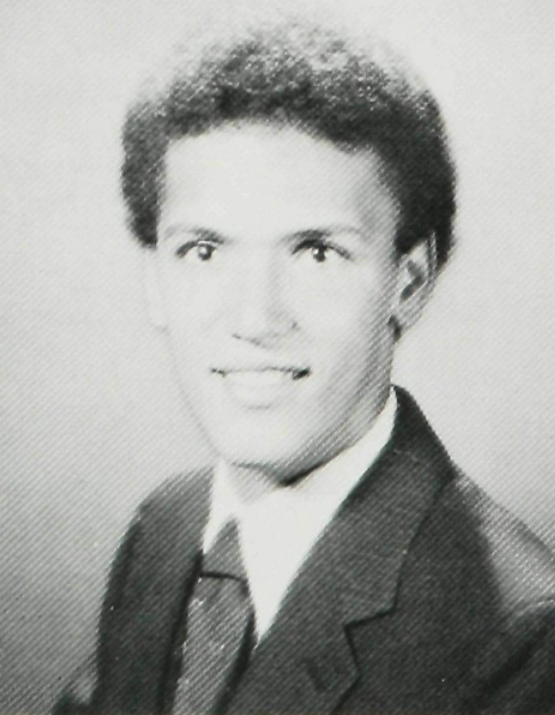
Perez in the Brown University yearbook, 1983

Perez received his Bachelor of Arts in international relations and political science from Brown University in 1983. He joined the Sigma Chi fraternity there. He covered the cost of attending Brown with scholarships and Pell Grants and by working as a trash collector and in a warehouse. He worked in Brown's dining hall and for the Rhode Island Commission for Human Rights.

In 1987, Perez received a Juris Doctor cum laude from Harvard Law School and a Master of Public Policy from the John F. Kennedy School of Government.

In 1986, while a student at Harvard, Perez worked as a law clerk for Attorney General Edwin Meese.

== Early career ==
After graduating from Harvard, Perez worked as a law clerk for Judge Zita Weinshienk of the United States District Court for the District of Colorado from 1987 to 1989.

From 1989 to 1995, he worked as a federal prosecutor in the Department of Justice's Civil Rights Division. He later served as Deputy Assistant Attorney General for Civil Rights under Attorney General Janet Reno. Perez chaired the interagency Worker Exploitation Task Force, which oversaw a variety of initiatives designed to protect workers.

From 1995 to 1998, Perez worked as Democratic Massachusetts Senator Ted Kennedy's principal adviser on civil rights, criminal justice, and constitutional issues. During the final two years of the second Clinton administration, he worked as the director of the Office for Civil Rights at the United States Department of Health and Human Services.

From 2001 to 2007, Perez was a professor at the University of Maryland School of Law, where he taught in the clinical law and the law and health program. He was a part-time member of the faculty at the George Washington University School of Public Health.

== Montgomery County Council ==
In 2002, Perez ran for the county council of Montgomery County, Maryland from its 5th District, which covers Silver Spring, Kensington, Takoma Park, and Wheaton. His main challenge was the Democratic primary, where he faced Sally Sternbach, the head of the Silver Spring Citizens Advisory Board and the Greater Silver Spring Chamber of Commerce. He defeated Sternbach with the support of the AFL–CIO and other labor groups. He faced Republican Dennis E. Walsh in the general election and won with 76% of the vote, becoming the first Hispanic council member.

Perez was on the council from 2002 to 2006. During that time, he served on the committees for Health and Human Services, and Transportation and the Environment. He also served as council president from 2004 to 2005. With council member Mike Subin, Perez pushed for legislation on predatory lending. The law allowed the county's Commission on Human Rights to investigate and prosecute loan brokers and third-party lenders engaging in predatory lending, raised the cap on compensation for victims, and required the commission to release an annual report on discriminatory and subprime lending in the county.

Perez opposed the privatization of the non-profit health insurer CareFirst, a non-stock holding, independent licensee of the Blue Cross and Blue Shield Association that provided coverage in Maryland, Delaware, Washington, D.C., and Virginia. He lobbied for support on the county council and in the Maryland General Assembly against the sale of CareFirst to Wellpoint (now Anthem). He led the council to a unanimous vote against the acquisition, leading to the rejection of the merger by Maryland's Commissioner of Insurance.

In 2004, Perez, and fellow council member Marilyn Praisner introduced an initiative to provide affordable prescription drugs for county employees and retirees, setting up a voluntary program to import high-quality, lower priced prescription drugs from suppliers in Canada approved by the U.S. Food and Drug Administration (FDA). The initiative was overwhelmingly passed by the council, though Montgomery County was denied a waiver by the FDA through the Medicare Prescription Drug, Improvement, and Modernization Act, leading to a lawsuit by Montgomery County against Health and Human Services Secretary Michael Leavitt, where the U.S. District Court for Maryland granted the FDA the right to dismiss.

== Maryland Attorney General campaign ==
After speculation arose that 20-year incumbent attorney general of Maryland J. Joseph Curran Jr. would announce his retirement in 2006, Perez was seen as a top contender to replace Curran. On May 23, 2006, after Curran announced he would not run for re-election, Perez launched his candidacy, in a three-city tour with former Maryland Attorney General and United States Attorney Stephen H. Sachs. Perez was backed by labor groups such as Maryland's State Teachers Association and the Service Employees International Union.

Perez's main challengers were Montgomery County State's Attorney Doug Gansler and Stuart O. Simms, a Baltimore lawyer who had served as Secretary of the Maryland Department of Public Safety and Correctional Services. Gansler, who got an early start in campaign contributions, raised over $1.4 million, compared to Perez's $200,000.

During the campaign, questions were raised over whether Perez was permitted to run under Maryland's State Constitution, due to a requirement that candidates for attorney general must have at least 10 years of previous experience practicing law in Maryland; It wasn't until 2001 that Perez had become a member of the Maryland State Bar Association. The lawsuit was filed by Stephen N. Abrams, a member of the Montgomery County Board of Education and the 2006 Republican candidate for Comptroller of Maryland.

Abrams argued that it was "absolutely wrong to say that Perez met the 10-year requirement", after he was cleared by the Maryland State Board of Elections, and received legal advice from Attorney General Curran, who opined that Perez's time as a federal prosecutor in Maryland seemingly met the requirement. The lawsuit, which was brought before the Anne Arundel County Circuit Court, was rejected by that court two months before the primary. Abrams appealed, bringing the case before the Maryland Court of Appeals, Maryland's highest court. The Court of Appeals rejected Perez's bid for attorney general. Perez then shifted his resources to support Martin O'Malley in his successful 2006 campaign for Governor of Maryland.

== Maryland Secretary of Labor ==
In January 2007, newly elected Governor Martin O'Malley selected Perez to run the Maryland Department of Labor, Licensing and Regulation.

In that role, Perez led efforts to target Maryland companies who were engaging in workplace fraud, imposing new restrictions on the employee misclassification as independent contractors. He helped with the implementation of H.R. 1590, the Workplace Fraud Act of 2009, imposing penalties for employers who falsely classified their employees as independent contractors, actions involving tax evasion by the employers as well as the denial of worker protections and health insurance benefits to employees. In May 2009, Governor O'Malley signed the act into law, with Perez saying that the act would "ensure that employers who attempt to cheat the system, their workers and their competitors, will pay a steep price for their actions".

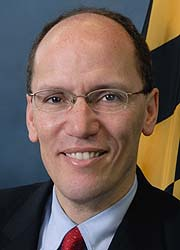
Perez's official portrait as Maryland's Secretary of DLLR

In 2004, then-Governor Robert Ehrlich vetoed an attempt to implement a living wage law in Maryland. Perez helped lead the reintroduction of a similar bill in 2007. After the bill passed and was signed by Governor O'Malley, Perez announced new provisions for out-of-state contractors and subcontractors doing business in Maryland, subjecting them to the same standards as in-state businesses.

Perez was a top adviser to O'Malley on Maryland's healthcare workforce shortage. Perez helped develop a plan relieving the chronic shortage of nurses in Maryland, allowing immigrants who have nursing qualifications in their home countries to have their certifications count towards becoming a registered nurse in the state.

Perez served as co-chair of the Maryland Workforce Creation and Adult Education Transition Council, alongside Maryland State Superintendent of Schools Nancy S. Grasmick, after Governor O'Malley moved the Maryland Adult Education and Literacy Services Program, the adult correctional education, and the GED Testing Office from the Department of Education to the Department of Labor. The council oversaw the extensive transition process, while commissioning a report on proposals to revamp the state adult education system and identifying inefficiencies in the state correctional education budget. Though the shift of the programs to the DLLR was proposed to allow the state to save money and create a more unified workforce system, the decision was criticized by adult education providers in the state and was seen as a political move by O'Malley to undermine control of the agency by Superintendent Grasmick.

During his first term as governor, O'Malley pushed proposals to expand gambling in Maryland, with Perez spearheading the legalization of slot machines in the state. The legislation was a central part of a plan to raise revenue to close Maryland's budget deficit (keeping revenue from crossing state lines), though Perez was criticized by many in his own party who saw the measure as a regressive way to raise revenue. Perez commissioned a report led by the DLLR arguing that the legalization of slots would be necessary to preserve Maryland's horse racing and breeding industries, with new revenue helping to address the issues of public education and school construction. The plan was approved in a state referendum by voters in the 2008 election, allowing 15,000 new slot machines in the state.

== Assistant Attorney General for Civil Rights ==
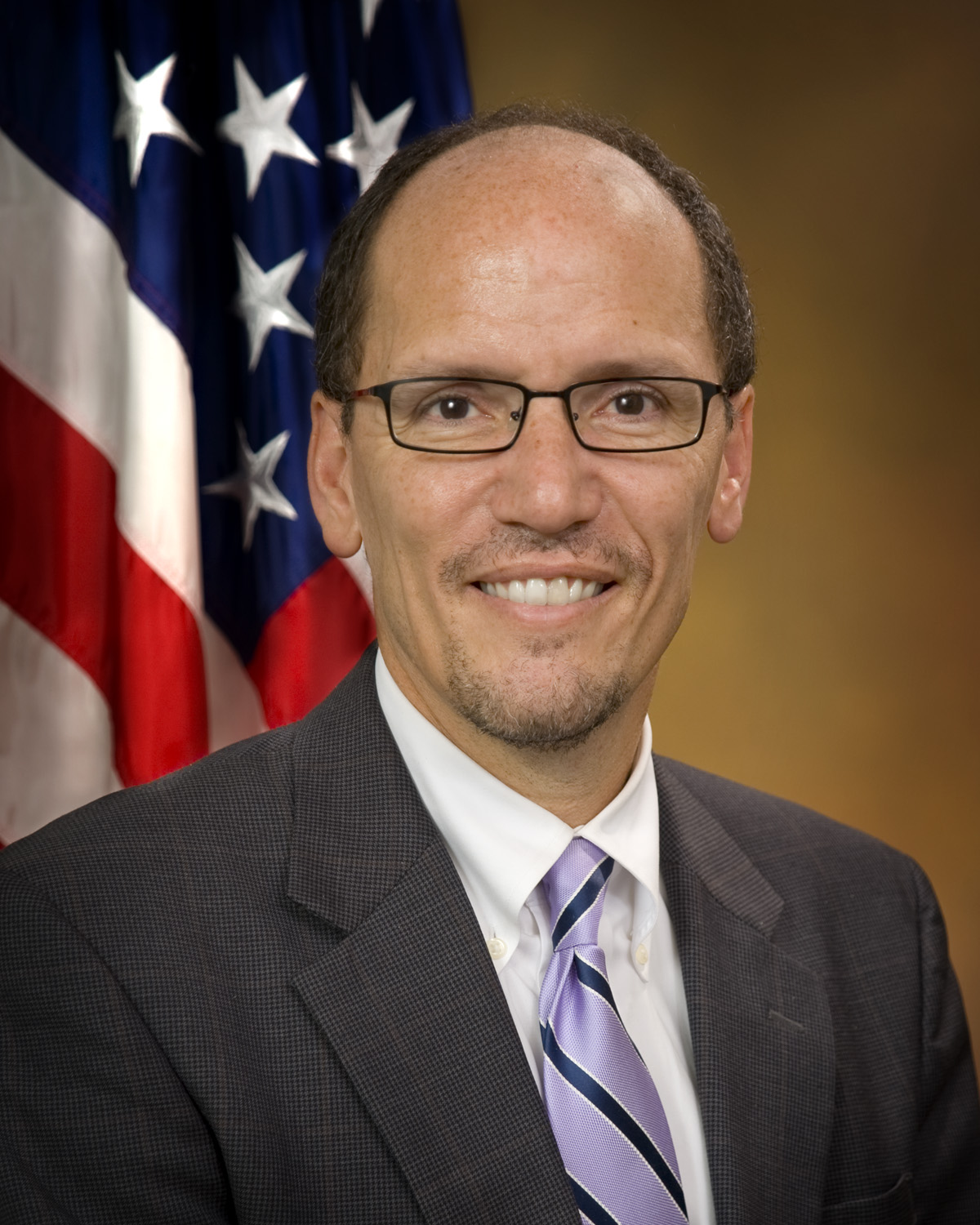
Perez's official Justice Department portrait

On March 31, 2009, President Barack Obama nominated Perez to be Assistant Attorney General for the Civil Rights Division of the United States Department of Justice. The Senate Judiciary Committee held a hearing on Perez's nomination on April 29, 2009, and on June 4, 2009, the committee voted 17–2 to send Perez's nomination to the full Senate. Perez's nomination then did not move forward for several months, amid questions by Republican senators about his record on immigration matters and a controversy over the Obama Justice Department's dismissal of a voter intimidation case against the militant New Black Panther Party. Senator Patrick Leahy (D-VT) characterized the opposition as foot-dragging and "posturing for narrow special interests". On October 6, 2009, the full United States Senate confirmed Perez in a bipartisan 72–22 vote. Only two senators spoke out against the nomination: Tom Coburn (R-OK) and David Vitter (R-LA).

Perez revamped Justice Department efforts in pursuing federal settlements and consent agreements under the Americans With Disabilities Act. One of Perez's main focuses was on the discrimination of individuals with HIV/AIDS, saying that it is "critical that we continue to work to eradicate discriminatory and stigmatizing treatment towards individuals with HIV based on unfounded fears and stereotypes".

Perez oversaw the division responsible for the implementation, and training of local enforcement in response to the passage of the Matthew Shepard and James Byrd, Jr. Hate Crimes Prevention Act; including overseeing the first hate-crime conviction under the law, in the racially motivated murder of James Craig Anderson. Perez endorsed the Employment Non-Discrimination Act in 2009, citing it one of his "top priorities", and at his first testimony after being confirmed as Assistant Attorney General, he said, "That LGBT individuals not being currently protected against discrimination in the workplace is perhaps one of the most gaping holes in our nation's civil rights laws."

=== Student discrimination ===
In 2009, the Civil Rights Division under Perez's tenure filed suit against a Herkimer County, New York school for "alleged violations of the Equal Protection Clause of the Fourteenth Amendment to the United States Constitution and Title IX of the Education Amendments of 1972". The plaintiff, a 14-year-old high school student from Mohawk, New York, who "dyes his hair, and wears make-up and nail polish", was reportedly subjected to verbal sex-based harassment and was "threatened, intimidated, and physically assaulted based on his non-masculine expression".

In J.L. v Mohawk Central School District, the settlement required the school district to begin "training staff in appropriate ways to address harassment", to "review its policies and procedures governing harassment" and "report to the New York Civil Liberties Union (which previously represented the student in the lawsuit), as well as the Department of Justice, on these efforts as well as its ongoing response". This was the first time since the Clinton administration that Title IX was applied to gender identity discrimination.

The Civil Rights Division reached a settlement with the Anoka-Hennepin School District in the Minneapolis–Saint Paul metropolitan area, after the district school board voted to repeal its policy prohibiting teachers from mentioning homosexuality in the classroom. Students who brought the lawsuit accused the district of creating a "hostile, anti-gay environment" and not doing enough to protect LGBT students. Perez praised the school board's decision, saying that the settlement is a "comprehensive blueprint for sustainable reform that will enhance the district's policies, training and other efforts to ensure that every student is free from sex-based harassment".

After a "comprehensive investigation" by the Civil Rights Division of a juvenile facility in Lauderdale County, Mississippi, Perez's division found multiple violations of due process and Miranda rights of African-American and disabled students at Meridian, Mississippi, schools by the Lauderdale County Youth Court, the Meridian Police Department and the Mississippi Division of Youth Services. The investigation described local and state authorities of running a "school-to-prison pipeline", by incarcerating students for minor school disciplinary infractions, such as violating school dress-code guidelines.

The Justice Department determined that a pattern existed of Mississippi authorities' failing to assess probable cause that unlawful offenses against the students had been committed, and that students were held in jail without the benefit of a hearing, a lawyer or Miranda rights; with Perez claiming that "the systematic disregard for children's basic constitutional rights by agencies with a duty to protect and serve these children betrays the public trust".

=== Police discrimination ===
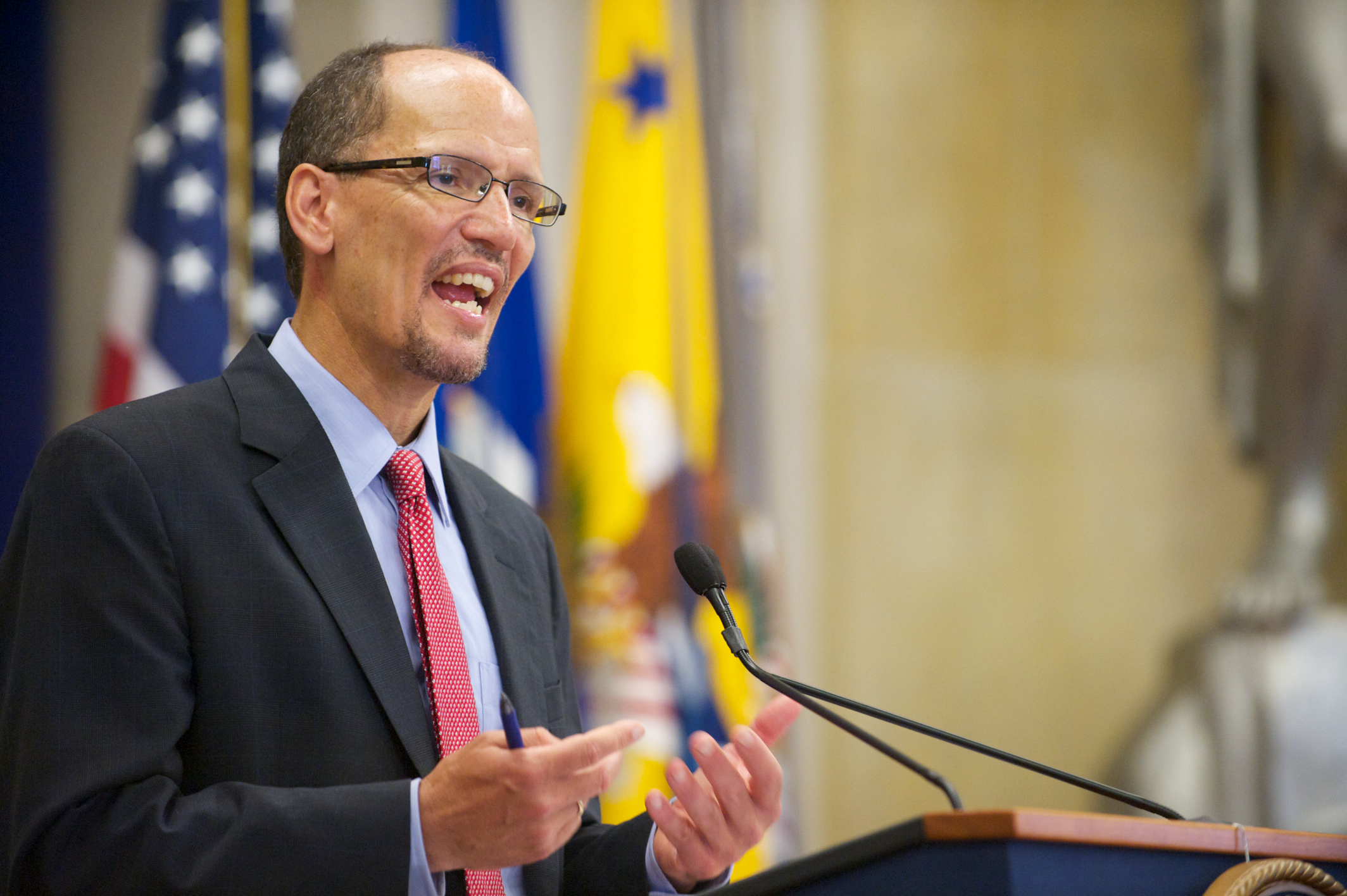
Perez giving a speech in Washington, D.C., on July 26, 2012

After the shooting death of Florida teenager Trayvon Martin, by George Zimmerman in Sanford, Florida, in 2012, Perez was brought in by Representative Alcee Hastings and Sanford Mayor Jeff Triplet to investigate the police department's handling of the case. A full-scale investigation was later launched by the Civil Rights Division, where Perez led an inquiry on the shooting investigation. After a thorough investigation was promised by Attorney General Eric Holder, Perez went to Florida, meeting with United States Attorney Robert O'Neil, family members of Trayvon Martin, and local officials to investigate whether the shooting was a racially motivated hate crime. The Justice Department launched a probe into Sanford police chief Bill Lee, who was fired two months after the beginning of the investigation.

After homeless Native American woodcarver John T. Williams was fatally shot by the Seattle Police Department in 2010, Perez led an eight-month investigation into the use of excessive force by the SPD. After the end of the Division's investigation, along with Jenny Durkan, the U.S. Attorney for the District of Western Washington, Perez released a report citing "constitutional violations regarding the use of force that result from structural problems, as well as serious concerns about biased policing" by the SPD. A settlement was later reached between the Civil Rights Division and the city of Seattle requiring the city to create a Community Police Commission, have the SPD under the supervision of an independent, court-appointed monitor, and encouraging police officers to de-escalate nonviolent confrontations by decreasing their use of force.

Maricopa County, Arizona investigation

In June 2008, the Civil Rights Division opened an investigation into the Maricopa County Sheriff's Office (MCSO) and Sheriff Joe Arpaio, following allegations that the MCSO was engaged in a pattern of practice of unlawful conduct.

An expanded investigation leading into Perez's tenure over "discriminatory police practices and unconstitutional searches and seizures", led to a lawsuit by the Justice Department after Arpaio rejected the department's request for documents regarding the investigation; this was the first time that the federal government sued a local law enforcement agency concerning Title VI of the Civil Rights Act of 1964 since the 1970s.

Perez released a 22-page report on discriminatory and racial biases against Latinos by the MCSO and Arpaio. The report found that the MCSO mistreated and used racial slurs against Spanish-speaking inmates; Latino drivers were four to nine times more likely than non-Latino drivers to be stopped in identical non-criminal instances; 20% of stops and seizures, almost all of them involving Latinos, were legally unjustified, violating the Fourth Amendment to the United States Constitution; and the MCSO and sheriff's deputies engaged in retaliation against individuals who participated in demonstrations against the office's policies regarding immigration. Arpaio was also found to have used racial and ethnic description, such as "individuals with dark skin" and "individuals speaking Spanish" as justification for immigration raids on businesses and homes, while overlooking criminal activity, as vindication for immigration raids led by the MCSO.

In May 2012, after the end of a three-year investigation, Perez led his division in a lawsuit against Maricopa County, the MCSO and Arpaio, for violating Section 14141 of the Violent Crime Control and Law Enforcement Act of 1994 and Title VI of the Civil Rights Act. Arpaio called the suit a political move by the Obama administration, while Perez called the suit an "abuse-of-power case involving a sheriff and sheriff's office that disregarded the Constitution, ignored sound police practices, compromised public safety and did not hesitate to retaliate against his perceived critics".

=== Voting rights ===
==== Voter ID laws ====
The Obama administration directed Perez and the Civil Rights Division in challenging South Carolina's 2011 voter ID law, over concerns that the law violated Section 5 of the Voting Rights Act of 1965. Perez successfully blocked the law from taking effect, after the Justice Department alleged that South Carolina had failed to prove that the law would not have a disproportionate effect on minority voters. In a letter to South Carolina's Deputy Assistant Attorney General, C. Havird Jones Jr., Perez questioned whether 81,000 registered voters, all of whom were minorities who didn't have government-issued or military photo identification, would be able to exercise their right to vote, citing "significant racial disparities in the proposed photo identification requirement".

Perez also oversaw the Obama administration's efforts in challenging a 2011 voter ID law signed by Texas Governor Rick Perry, the second voter ID law consequently found to have violated Section 5 of the Voting Rights Act. Addressing the Supreme Court case Crawford v. Marion County Election Board, where the court upheld the constitutionality of Indiana's photo ID requirement, Perez argued that "[Texas's] submission did not include evidence of significant in-person voter impersonation not already addressed by the state's existing laws". Perez also stressed data from the Texas Department of Public Safety that found that registered Hispanic voters were 46.5% to 120% less likely than non-Hispanic voters to have a government issued driver's license or state required photo ID.

==== New Black Panther Party case ====
On May 14, 2010, Perez testified to the U.S. Commission on Civil Rights that political leadership was not involved in the decision to dismiss three of the four defendants in the NBPP case. However, on March 12, 2013, the Department of Justice Inspector General released a report stating that Perez's testimony did not reflect the entire story, as AAG Perelli and DAAG Sam Hirsch were involved in consultations on the case. However, the Inspector General found that Perez did not know about these consultations at the time of his testimony, and therefore he did not intentionally mislead the commission. However, because of his role as a Department witness, the Inspector General believed that Perez should have inquired further on this issue before testifying.

In the same report, the Inspector General found that the Civil Rights Division exhibited a clear priority in enforcing the motor-voter provisions of the NVRA over the list-maintenance provisions. However, the Inspector General did not find sufficient evidence to conclude that these differences in enforcement were for political reasons. In particular, they found that Perez sent letters about list-maintenance enforcement in December 2010, so as not to be viewed as interfering with the 2010 elections. However, this letter provided no guidance on how states were to enforce list-maintenance procedures, instead leaving it up to the states. Overall, the report stated that: "The conduct that we discovered and document in this report reflects a disappointing lack of professionalism by some Department employees over an extended period of time, during two administrations, and across various facets of the Voting Section's operations."

== Secretary of Labor (2013–2017) ==
=== Nomination and confirmation ===
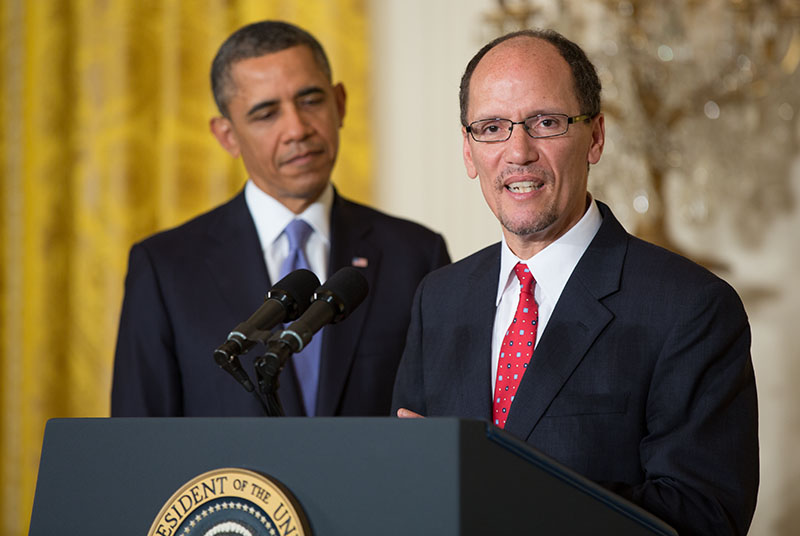
Assistant Attorney General Perez with President Barack Obama during Perez's nomination for Secretary of Labor

On March 18, 2013, President Barack Obama nominated Perez to be Secretary of Labor, succeeding outgoing Secretary Hilda Solis. Perez's nomination was criticized by Senators Chuck Grassley (R-IA) and Pat Roberts (R-KS), as well as the editorial board of the Wall Street Journal, for his decision not to intervene in a whistleblower case against Saint Paul, Minnesota, in return for the city's dropping a case before the Supreme Court (Magner v. Gallagher), which could have undermined the disparate impact theory of discrimination. Senator Jeff Sessions (R-AL) opposed the nomination because of Perez's views on immigration and his association with CASA de Maryland, calling the nomination "an unfortunate and needlessly divisive nomination". Perez's nomination was supported by Senator Tom Harkin (D-IA), the chairman of the Senate Committee on Health, Education, Labor, and Pensions, the committee that oversees the Department of Labor. His nomination was also supported by labor groups, such as the AFL-CIO and the United Farm Workers of America as well as the National Association for the Advancement of Colored People and the National Women's Law Center.

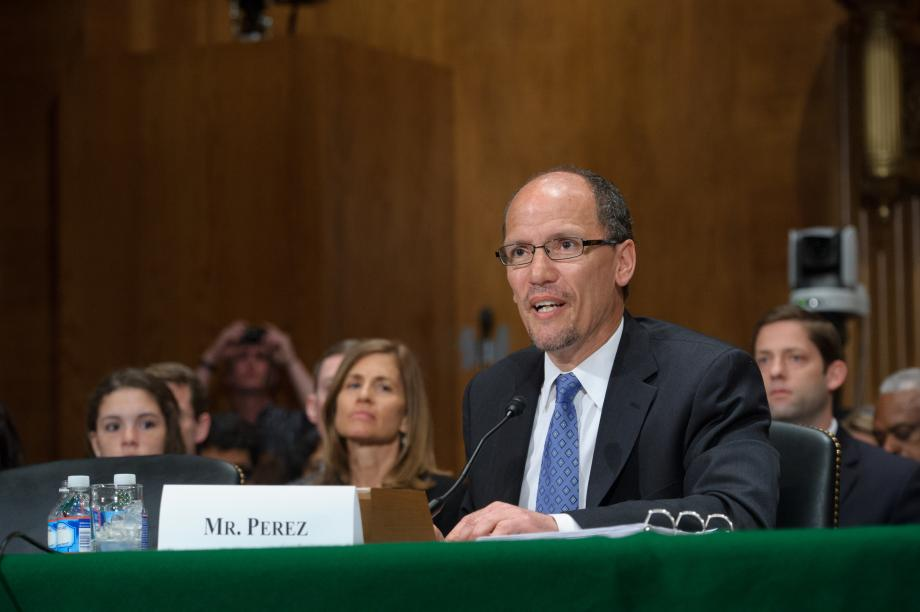
Perez at his Senate confirmation hearing for Secretary of Labor

Republican members of the United States House Committee on Oversight and Government Reform subpoenaed Perez's personal e-mails and released a 64-page report into Perez's actions in the St. Paul whistleblower case, saying that Perez "manipulated justice and ignored the rule of law".

At his confirmation hearing on April 18, 2013, Perez was questioned about his role in Magner v. Gallagher and the NBPP case as well as the Obama administration's plan to raise the minimum wage from $7.25 to $9 an hour.

The confirmation vote was delayed to May 8 to give Senate Democrats more time to review Perez's role in Magner v. Gallagher, and then to May 16, at which time Perez's nomination cleared the committee on a party line vote of 12–10. Senate Majority Leader Harry Reid (D-NV) postponed a full Senate vote on the nomination until July.

As Senate Democrats pushed in July 2013 to eliminate the filibuster for all executive-branch nominees, senators struck a deal for a Senate vote on Perez's nomination. On July 17, 2013, the Senate voted 60–40 for cloture on Perez's nomination, ending the filibuster. On July 18, 2013, the Senate voted 54–46 to confirm Perez as Secretary of Labor. It was the first Senate confirmation vote in history in which a cabinet member's confirmation received a party-line vote, something many press observers termed "historic".

=== Actions ===
Perez began his tenure by holding several meetings seeking to implement the Fiduciary Rule. The Fiduciary Rule imposes a fiduciary level standard of care on retirement advisors forbidding them from receiving any commissions that create a conflict of interest.

The rule was originally drafted in 2010 but had not been implemented after over 200 members of Congress sent letters urging the rule be withdrawn. Secretary Perez met with stakeholders during new rulemaking and then held a conference at the Center for American Progress, where he announced he was implementing the Fiduciary Rule on April 6, 2016. Congress passed legislation overturning the Fiduciary Rule, but it was vetoed by President Obama on June 9, 2016.

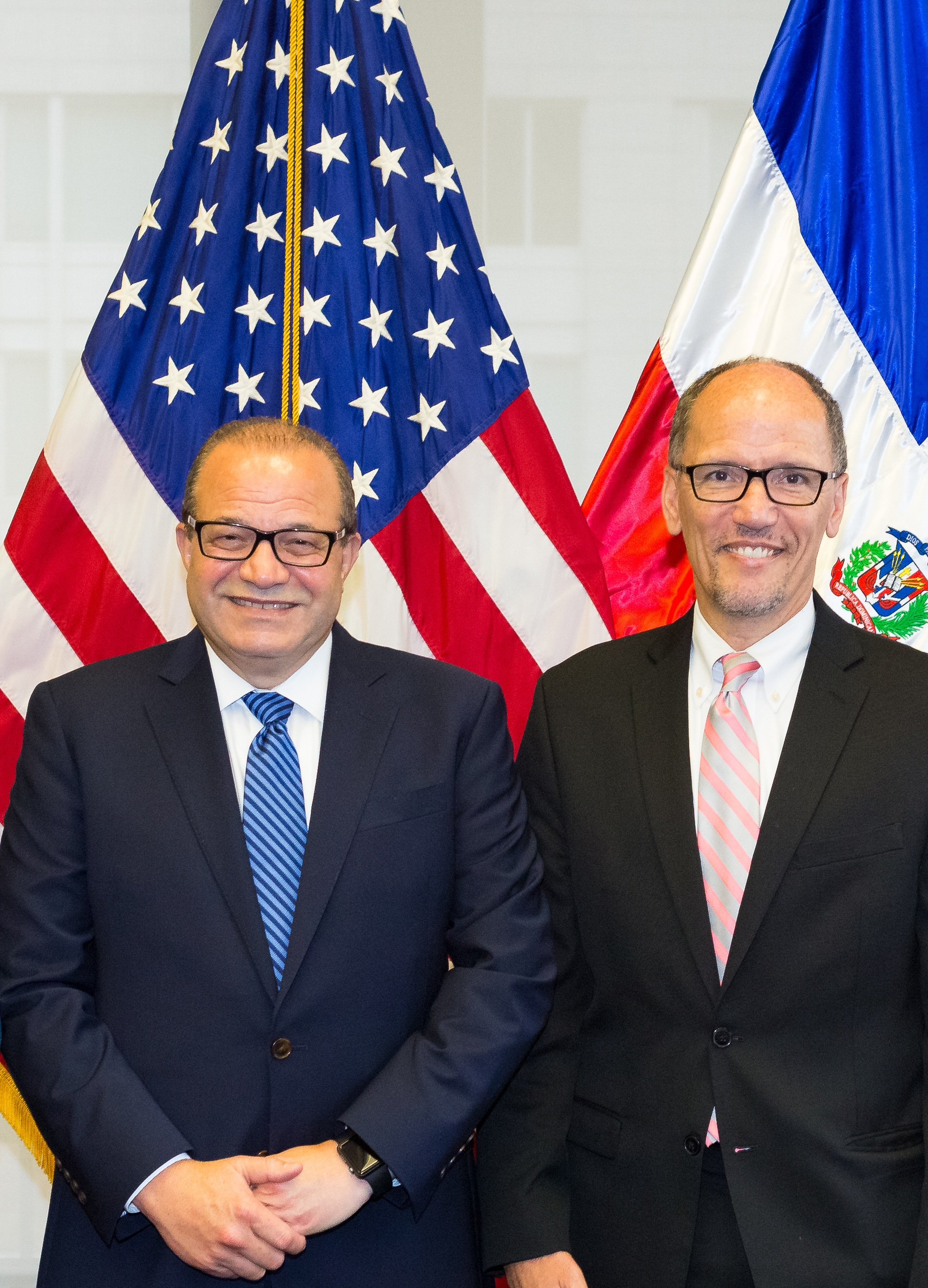
Perez with José Tomás Pérez, Dominican Republic Ambassador to the United States

In May 2016, following several days of negotiations, Verizon and striking labor union workers reached contract agreements at the Department of Labor headquarters in Washington, D.C.

Secretary Perez issued the Home Care Rule, requiring that home care workers for the elderly and/or people with disabilities receive minimum-wage and overtime compensation, effective January 1, 2015. In December 2014, U.S. District Judge Richard J. Leon vacated the rule, finding it arbitrary and capricious. In August 2015, Circuit Judge Sri Srinivasan, joined by Judges Thomas B. Griffith and Nina Pillard reversed, reinstating the rule. On June 27, 2016, the Supreme Court declined review.

Perez regularly made 'house calls' or onsite trips to obtain personal feedback and listen to workers who shared stories of their experiences. The Department of Labor launched a Veterans employment website to assist veterans with locating and utilizing employment resources.

Secretary Perez used the Labor Management Reporting and Disclosure Act of 1959 as authority to issue the Persuader Rule, which required an employer's attorney to publicly disclose advice given to persuade against unionization.

Before the rule took effect on July 1, 2016, the National Federation of Independent Business sued. On June 26, U.S. District Judge Samuel Ray Cummings issued a nationwide injunction blocking the Persuader Rule, finding it was not authorized by the Act, and that it violated the First Amendment to the United States Constitution. On August 25, Perez implemented the President's Fair Pay and Safe Workplaces executive order. On October 4, U.S. District Judge Marcia A. Crone issued a nationwide injunction blocking the rule. Crone found the Constitution's Due Process Clause forbids the president from requiring federal contractors to disclose mere allegations that the contractor had violated labor laws.

Perez issued a regulation attempting to double the maximum salary where overtime is required, effective December 1. On November 22, U.S. District Judge Amos L. Mazzant III, issued a nationwide injunction blocking the regulation, finding that the overtime pay rule was beyond the Secretary's authority under the Fair Labor Standards Act.

During the 2016 presidential election, Perez was mentioned as a possible running mate on the Democratic ticket with Hillary Clinton, but was ultimately not selected. Perez later campaigned for the Clinton-Kaine ticket.

Perez claimed that questions by the Donald Trump Presidential Transition team sent to the State and Energy Departments were illegal, but he said he was not aware of any similar 'blanket' probes having been sent to the Labor Department.

== Chair of the Democratic National Committee ==
Perez announced his candidacy for Chair of the Democratic National Committee (DNC) on December 15, 2016. Perez gave the keynote speech for the Maryland Democratic Party annual legislative luncheon on January 10, 2017, in Annapolis. Perez promised not to take money from federal lobbyists, foreign nationals, or current Labor Department employees. His candidacy was endorsed by former Vice President Joe Biden and other Obama administration officials.

On February 25, 2017, Perez was elected DNC chair. Perez won on the second ballot with 235 votes, beating nearest rival Representative Keith Ellison who earned 200 votes. Perez was the first Latino DNC chair. After winning the election, Perez's immediate response was to make a motion to suspend the rules and recreate the (largely ceremonial) role of deputy chair, and to install Ellison into the office. Perez is the first Dominican-American to chair the Democratic National Committee. He undertook a Unity Tour in 2017 with Senator Bernie Sanders (I-VT) to promote the DNC.

Following the 2020 Iowa Democratic caucuses, Perez received pressure from outside groups, including presidential candidate, Tulsi Gabbard, to resign as the DNC chair. Perez refused to resign, citing the amount of elections Democrats had won since he assumed the chairmanship in 2017.

In November 2020, Perez was reported to be a potential contender for United States Attorney General or Secretary of Labor in the Biden administration.

Perez declined to run for reelection as DNC Chair in 2021, and Jaime Harrison was elected to succeed him on January 21, 2021.

== 2022 Maryland gubernatorial campaign ==
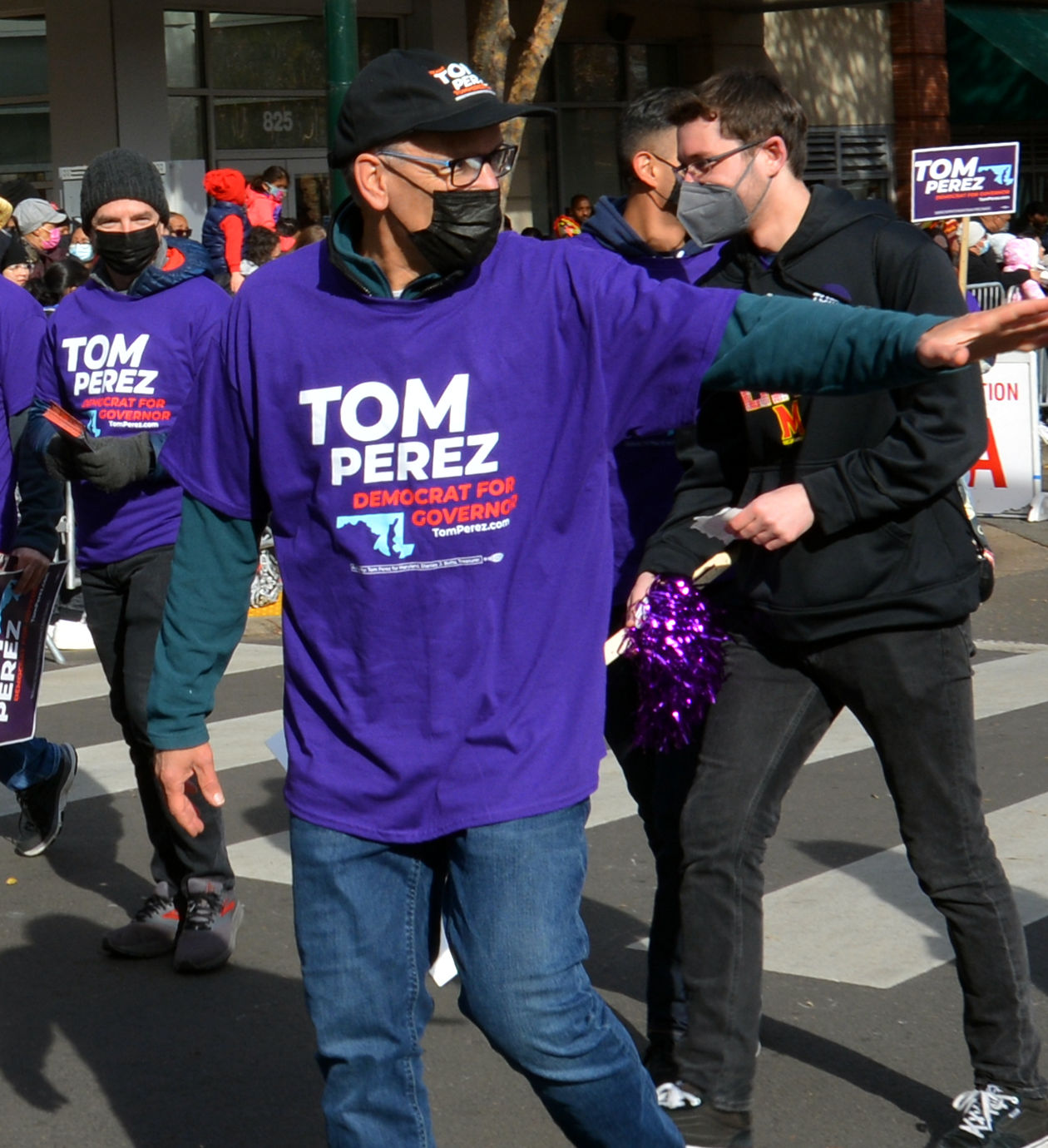
Perez campaigning in November 2021

On June 23, 2021, Perez announced that he would be a candidate for the Democratic nomination for Governor of Maryland in the 2022 Maryland gubernatorial election. His running mate was Shannon Sneed, a former member of the Baltimore City Council. If elected, he would have become Maryland's first Latino governor.

Many labor groups issued early endorsements of Perez, including the Amalgamated Transit Union, American Federation of State, County and Municipal Employees, the Communication Workers of America, International Brotherhood of Electrical Workers, and the Service Employees International Union.

Perez received endorsements from various members of Congress, including members of the Congressional Hispanic Caucus and Speaker of the United States House of Representatives Nancy Pelosi.

On July 14, 2022, Perez's campaign announced that its workers had unionized with Campaign Workers Guild.

On July 19, 2022, Perez lost the primary, placing second behind Wes Moore, an author and U.S. Army veteran.

== Biden White House ==
On June 12, 2023, President Biden named Perez to serve as senior advisor to the president and director of the White House Office of Intergovernmental Affairs. Perez participated in White House press conferences in the aftermath of the March 2024 Francis Scott Key Bridge collapse in Maryland.

== Personal life ==
Perez owns a home in Takoma Park, Maryland, with his wife, Ann Marie Staudenmaier, an attorney with the Washington Legal Clinic for the Homeless, and their three children.

Perez is Catholic, and recalls that his parents told him, "In order to get to heaven, you have to have letters of reference from poor people."

Ancestors of Tom Perez

16. José del Socorro Pérez Agüero (1818–?)
8. Francisco Pérez Chávez (1848–?)
17. Lorenza Chávez Contreras
4. José Pérez Nolasco (1883–?)
18. Matías Nolasco Román (1815–?)
9. Concepción Nolasco Aguiar (1852–?)
19. María Florencia Aguiar Carmona (1815–1885)
2. Rafael Antonio Perez (né Rafael Antonio de Jesús Pérez de Lara, b. 1922)
20. Fernando de Lara Rojas
10. Eduardo de Lara Rojas
21. María Francisca Rojas Guzmán
5. Ana de Lara Hernández (1890–?)
22. Telésforo Hernández Trejo
11. Rómula del Carmen Hernández Hernández
23. Anacleta de Jesús Hernández Camacho
1. Thomas Edward Perez
24. Justo Brache
12. Elías Brache Soriano (1847-1912)
25. Francisca del Rosario Soriano
6. Rafael Ángel Brache Ramírez (1888–?)
26. Anselmo Ramírez de Arellano
13. María Apolonia Ramírez Melert
27. Isabel Julia Melert
3. Grace Perez (née Altagracia Brache Bernard)
28. Juan Evangelista Bernard Rodríguez
14. N. Bernard Sánchez
29. María Saturnina Sánchez Jiménez
7. Dolores Grecia Bernard González (1896–?)
15. N. González

== Honorary degrees ==
In 2014, Perez received an honorary Doctorate of Laws from Brown University, an honorary Doctorate of Laws from Drexel University School of Law, and an honorary Doctorate of Humanities from Oberlin College.

Legal offices
Preceded by Wan Kim	United States Assistant Attorney General for Civil Rights; 2009–2013	Succeeded by Jocelyn Samuels; Acting
Political offices
Preceded by Hilda Solis	United States Secretary of Labor; 2013–2017	Succeeded by Alex Acosta
Preceded by Julie Rodriguez	Director of the White House Office of Intergovernmental Affairs; 2023–2025	Succeeded by Alex Meyer
Party political offices
Preceded by Donna Brazile; Acting	Chair of the Democratic National Committee; 2017–2021	Succeeded by Jaime Harrison
U.S. order of precedence (ceremonial)
Preceded by Anthony Foxx as Former U.S. Cabinet Member	Order of precedence of the United States as Former U.S. Cabinet Member	Succeeded by Jeh Johnson as Former U.S. Cabinet Member
