= Thomas E. Baker =

American law professor

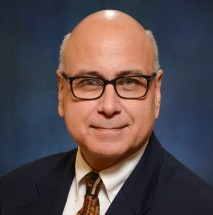
- Education: Florida State University (1974); University of Florida (1977)
- Scientific career
- Fields: Constitutional law
- Workplaces: Texas Tech University School of Law (1979–98); Drake University Law School (1998–2002); Florida International University College of Law (2002–present)

Thomas Eugene Baker is an American legal scholar who specializes in constitutional law and the federal courts. He is a professor of law and a founding faculty member of the Florida International University College of Law. Baker has written or edited eighteen books, including two casebooks, and more than 200 law review articles.

== Education ==
Baker graduated cum laude from Florida State University in 1974 with a Bachelor of Science in economics and political science. He received a Juris Doctor with high honors from the University of Florida College of Law in 1977, where he served on the board of the Florida Law Review and as a Moot Court board editor. He is a member of the Order of the Coif, Phi Kappa Phi and Omicron Delta Kappa.

== Career ==
From 1977 to 1979, Baker clerked for Judge James C. Hill of the United States Court of Appeals for the Fifth Circuit. He then joined the faculty of Texas Tech University School of Law, where he taught from 1979 to 1998 and held the Alvin R. Allison Distinguished Professorship.

Baker worked at the Supreme Court of the United States as a Judicial Fellow from 1985 to 1986 and as acting administrative assistant to Chief Justice William Rehnquist from 1986 to 1987. From 1990 to 1995, by appointment of the Chief Justice, he served on the Judicial Conference's Committee on Rules of Practice and Procedure, and the Judicial Conference later gave him a commendation for that service. He has also taught American constitutional law as a Fulbright professor at the University of Athens.

In 1998, Baker became director of the Constitutional Law Center at Drake University Law School, where he held the James Madison Chair in Constitutional Law. In 2002, he joined the founding faculty of the Florida International University College of Law, where he teaches constitutional law and the First Amendment. He has been a visiting professor at the University of Florida (1994) and at William & Mary Law School (2007).

Baker served on the board of editors of the Journal of Supreme Court History (1991–1993), the legal policy advisory board of the Washington Legal Foundation (1998–2012), the board of directors of the American Judicature Society (2000–2002), and the advisory committee of the Journal of Legal Education (2012–2015). He is a fellow of the American Bar Foundation and the American Academy of Appellate Lawyers and a life member of the American Law Institute.

== Awards ==
At FIU, Baker received the Pioneer Award from the Student Bar Association (2004), the Faculty Recognition Award (2010), and the Top Scholar Award and Book Author Award (2012). Students have named him Professor of the Year four times. In 2018, Marquis Who's Who gave him its Albert Nelson Marquis Lifetime Achievement Award.

== Media ==
Baker has commented on constitutional law and the federal courts in outlets including NPR, Slate, Law.com, C-SPAN and CNN's Burden of Proof.

== Publications ==
The following is a selection of Baker’s writings.

=== Casebooks ===
- First Amendment Law: Freedom of Expression and Freedom of Religion (Carolina Academic Press 5th ed. 2022) (with Arthur D. Hellman, William D. Araiza, & Ashutosh Bhagwat).
- Appellate Courts: Structures, Functions, Processes, and Personnel (LexisNexis 2d ed. 2006) (with Daniel J. Meador & Joan E. Steinman).

=== Selected books ===
- Constitutional Analysis in a Nutshell (West Academic Publ’g 4th ed. 2025).
- Skills & Values: Constitutional Law (LexisNexis 2013) (with William D. Araiza, Olympia R. Duhart & Steven I. Friedland).
- A Primer on the Jurisdiction of the U.S. Courts of Appeals (Federal Judicial Center 3d ed. 2023).
- At War with Civil Rights and Civil Liberties (Rowman & Littlefield Publishers 2006) (editor with John F. Stack Jr.).
- Amicus Humoriae: An Anthology of Legal Humor (Carolina Academic Press 2003) (editor with Robert M. Jarvis & Andrew J. McClurg).
- Federal Court Practice and Procedure: A Third Branch Bibliography (William S. Hein & Co., Inc. 2001).
- The Most Wonderful Work: Our Constitution Interpreted (West Publishing Co. 1996)
- Can a Good Christian Be a Good Lawyer? Homilies, Witnesses, and Reflections (University of Notre Dame Press 1998) (editor with Timothy W. Floyd).
- Rationing Justice on Appeal: The Problems of the U.S. Courts of Appeals (West Publ’g Co. 1994).

=== Selected articles ===
- 2025 Report to the Editor in Chief of the FIU Law Review, 20 FIU L. REV. vii (2026).
- A Survey of the Literature on Federal Appellate Practice and Procedure, 18 FIU L. REV. 43 (2023).
- Third Annual Report to the Editor-in-Chief, 18 FIU L. REV. vii (2023).
- Second Annual Report to the Editor-in-Chief, 17 FIU L. REV. vii (2023).
- Report to the Editor in Chief of the FIU Law Review, 16 FIU L. REV. vii (2022).
- A Primer on Supreme Court Practices and Procedures, A.B.A. PREVIEW OF SUPREME COURT CASES (2022).
- Dehors the Record: A Correction of a Final Jeopardy Question, 14 FIU L. REV. 709 (2021).
- Book Review: John Paul Stevens, Five Chiefs — a Supreme Court Memoir, 62 J. LEGAL EDUC. 647 (2013).
- A Modest Experiment in Pedagogy: Lessons on Comparative Constitutional Law, 6 FIU L. REV. 99 (2012).
- Book Review: Jack M. Balkin & Reva B. Siegel, eds. The Constitution in 2020, 50 AMER. J. LEGAL HIST. 104 (2010).
- An Annotated Bibliography on Federal Appellate Practice and Procedure, 10 J. APP. PRAC. & PROC. 13 (2009).
- Applied Freakonomics: Explaining the “Crisis of Volume,” 8 J. APP. PRAC. & PROC. 101(2007).
- Reflections on Law Schools and the Idea of the University, 1 FIU L. REV. 1 (2006).
- Constitutional Theory in a Nutshell, 13 WM & MARY BILL RTS. J. 57 (2004).
- Civil Rights and Civil Liberties in a Crisis: A Few Pages of History, 3 NEV. L. J. 23 (2002).
- A Symposium Précis, 50 DRAKE L. REV. 359 (2002).
- A Roundtable Discussion with Stephen L. Carter & Michael J. Gerhardt, 50 DRAKE L. REV. 411 (2002).
- A Compendium of Clever and Amusing Law Review Writings—An Idiosyncratic Bibliography of Miscellany with In Kind Annotations Intended as a Humorous Diversion for the Gentle Reader, 51 DRAKE L. REV. 105 (2002).
- A Case Study on the Importance of Settling the National Law: Why We Call the Supreme Court “Supreme,” 4 GREENBAG 2d 129 (Winter 2001).
- The Supreme Nonet, 18 CONST. COMMENTARY 291 (2001) (review poem).
- Towards a “More Perfect Union”—Some Thoughts on Amending the Constitution, 10 WIDENER J. PUB. L. 1 (2000).
- Tyrannous Lex, 82 IOWA L. REV. 689 (1997).
- A View to the Future of Judicial Federalism: “Neither Out Far Nor in Deep,” 45 CASE W. RES. L. REV. 705 (1995).
- Intramural Reforms: How the U.S. Courts of Appeals Have Helped Themselves, 22 FLA. ST. UNIV. L. REV. 913 (1995).
- Exercising the Amendment Power to Disapprove of Supreme Court Decisions: A Proposal for a “Republican Veto,” 22 HASTINGS CONST. L.Q. 325 (1995).
- An Assessment of Past Extramural Reforms of the U.S. Courts of Appeals, 28 GA. L. REV. 863 (1994).
- Imagining the Alternative Futures of the U.S. Courts of Appeals, 28 GA. L. REV. 913 (1994).
- Taking Another Measure of the “Crisis of Volume” in the U.S. Courts of Appeals, 51 WASH. & LEE L. REV. 97 (1994) (with Denis J. Hauptly).
- A Legislative History of the Creation of the Eleventh Circuit, 8 GA. ST. U. L. REV. 363 (1992).
- Some Preliminary Thoughts on Long-Range Planning for the Federal Judiciary, 23 TEX. TECH L. REV. 1 (1992).
- Why Congress Should Repeal the Federal Employers’ Liability Act of 1908, 28 HARV. J. ON LEGIS. 79 (1992).
- The Impropriety of Expert Witness Testimony on the Law, 40 U. KAN. L. REV. 325 (1992).
- Not Another Constitutional Law Course: A Proposal to Teach a Course on the Constitution, 76 IOWA L. REV. 739 (1991) (with James E. Viator).
- On Redrawing Circuit Boundaries—Why the Proposal to Divide the United States Court of Appeals for the Ninth Circuit is Not Such A Good Idea, 22 ARIZ. ST. L.J. 917 (1990).
- A Course on the Constitution, 40 J. LEGAL EDUC. 530 (1990) (with James E. Viator).
- Siskel and Ebert at the Supreme Court, 87 MICH. L. REV. 1472 (1989).
- The Need for a New National Court, 100 HARV. L. REV. 1400 (1987) (with Douglas D. McFarland).
- Thinking About Federal Jurisdiction—Of Serpents and Swallows, 17 ST. MARY'S L.J. 239 (1986).
- Eighth Amendment Challenges to the Length of a Criminal Sentence: Following the Supreme Court “From Precedent to Precedent”, 27 ARIZ. L. REV. 25 (1985) (with Fletcher N. Baldwin, Jr.).
- The Ambiguous Independent and Adequate State Ground in Criminal Cases: Federalism Along a Mobius Strip, 19 GA. L. REV. 799 (1985).
- A Compendium of Proposals to Reform the United States Courts of Appeals, 37 U. FLA. L. REV. 225 (1985).
- Dam Federal Jurisdiction!, 32 EMORY L.J. 3 (1983) (with Hon. James C. Hill).
- A Postscript on Precedent in the Divided Fifth Circuit, 36 SW. L.J. 725 (1982).
- Precedent Times Three: Stare Decisis in the Divided Fifth Circuit, 35 SW. L.J. 687 (1981)
