= Larry Leiby =

American lawyer

Larry Leiby (born 1947) began his law practice in construction law in 1973 in South Florida. He founded and was the first chair of the Construction Law Committee of the Florida Bar Real Property Section (1976–1994). He was one of nine members of the original Florida Bar Construction Law Certification Committee appointed in 2004, later chaired that committee, and was in the first class of Florida Bar Board Certified Construction Lawyers in 2005.

He is a neutral in the JAMS Global Engineering and Construction Panel. He is a fellow in the College of Commercial Arbitrators. He is a Certified Florida Circuit Court Civil Mediator, as well as an internationally certified mediator by the International Mediation Institute (IMI).

Leiby has served as a mediator, arbitrator, insurance valuation umpire, and as a special master for the Circuit Court in Miami-Dade County. He has arbitrated disputes in Florida, Pennsylvania, and Alabama, the largest involving claims of eight figures. He has served as an advocate in construction disputes (pre-litigation negotiation, mediation, litigation and arbitration) since 1973. He has written and presented several appeals before the Florida appellate courts. He has drafted construction contracts and documents for contract administration for local governments, developers, contractors, and subcontractors.

He is a member of the Association for Conflict Resolution, the ABA Forum Committee on the Construction Industry, ABA Alternate Dispute Resolution Section, Florida Bar Construction Law Committee, Alternate Dispute Resolution Section, and Miami International Arbitration Society.

== Teaching ==
Leiby serves as an adjunct professor teaching construction law at the Florida International University College of Law.

He has taught and lectured on construction law topics for the ABA Forum Committee on Construction, the Florida Bar, JAMS, the Construction Specifications Institute National Convention, the Tile Contractors Association National Convention, local bar associations, and several national, state, and local construction industry trade associations. He teaches continuing education courses for Florida state licensed contractors.

He was a member of the American Arbitration Association committee to develop training for construction arbitrators and was one of the arbitrator-training faculty teaching Construction Arbitration I (basic construction arbitration), and Construction Arbitration II (advanced case management techniques) (1996–1999).

== Works ==
- The Florida Construction Law Manual, originally published by Shepards/McGraw-Hill (1981), now published annually by Thomson-Reuters (West Group), which text is also on-line as Volume 8 of the Westlaw Florida Practice Series
- Chapters on construction contracts, construction liens, and payment bonds in The Contractor's Manual (2003, 2008, 2012) published by Associated Builders and Contractors Florida East Coast Chapter, (included in Florida state construction industry licensing examinations)
- "Licensing for Construction: A Legal Mechanism of Control" in Comparative Studies in Construction Law: The Sweet Lectures, published by Construction Law Press, London, UK (1996)
- "1998 Changes to Public Works Bonds and Construction Lien Law", Florida Bar Journal (1999)
- "Contractual Indemnity in Construction for Your Own Negligence – What Year Is It?," Florida Bar Journal, (July/Aug 2003)
- "How to Comply with Chapter 558 Florida Statutes: Current Challenges and Future Changes" *Florida Bar Journal, (Feb 2009) with co-author Steven B. Lesser
- "The Interaction Between Arbitration & Construction Lien Enforcement", AAA Dispute Resolution Journal, Volume 66, Number 2 (May–July 2011)
- "When is a 'Final Construction Lien Release Really Final?" Florida Bar Journal, (January, 2012)
- "Professional Liability Policies 101", Construction Today, (August, 2012)
- "DRB'S Offer a Proactive Approach to Dispute Avoidance/Resolution", Engineering News Record (September, 2012)

== Awards and recognition ==
- The Lifetime Achievement Award from the Florida Bar Construction Law Committee, 2008
- The American Subcontractors Association's Leonard A. Weiss Legislative Achievement Award, 1988
- The Excellence in Construction Education Award from the Florida Institute of Technology Construction Industry Advisory Board, 2005

He has been recognized for the following distinctions in construction law by peer review:

- Martindale-Hubbell Register of Preeminent Attorneys
- Woodard/White's Best Lawyers in America
- Chambers USA America's Leading Business Lawyers
- List of Top Lawyers in South Florida by South Florida Legal Guide
- the International Who's Who of Construction Lawyers
- AVVO "10" rating
