= Henry Latimer (judge) =

American judge (1938–2005)

Henry Latimer (January 22, 1938 – January 24, 2005) was the first African-American circuit court judge in Broward County, and was in line to become the first African-American president of the Florida Bar when he was killed in a car accident in South Florida. At the time, he was an attorney for the firm of Greenberg Traurig, a member of the Board of Trustees for the University of Miami, and a visiting professor who taught Alternative Dispute Resolution in the Florida International University College of Law.

Latimer was born in Ocilla, Georgia, and grew up amidst segregation in Jacksonville, Florida. He received his bachelor's degree from Florida A&M University and a master's degree from Florida Atlantic University. After a brief stint as an investigator for the United States Department of Labor he went to law school, becoming one of the first African-Americans to graduate from the University of Miami School of Law.

Latimer was appointed to Broward Circuit Court by Governor Bob Graham in 1979. He was retained in that seat in an election the following year. He died in Broward County, Florida, when his car collided with debris on the road.
