= Law school dean =

Administrator in law school

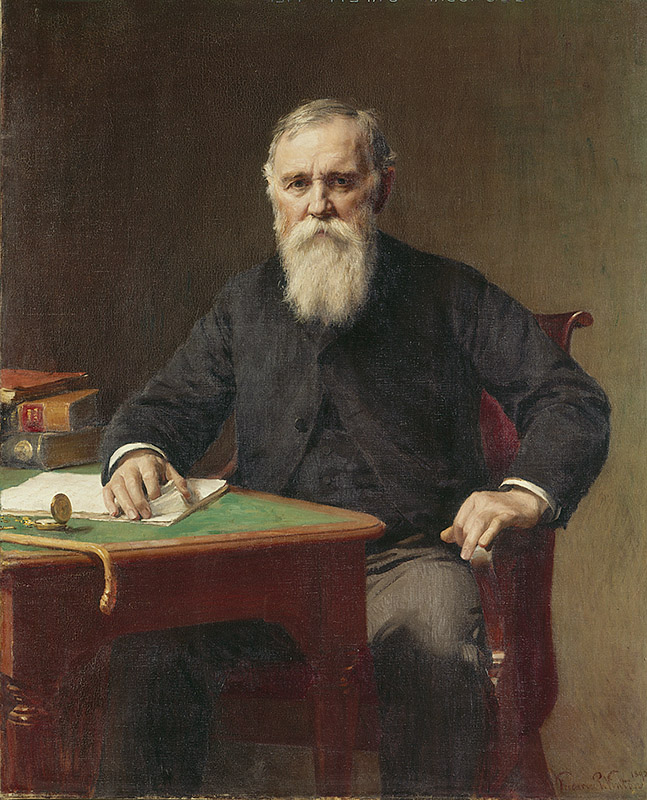
Christopher Columbus Langdell, dean of Harvard Law School from 1870 to 1885, established numerous precedents and practices in American legal education.

A law school dean is usually the highest-ranking administrator in a law school.

== Functions and duties ==
Almost every American law school refers to its highest-ranking administrator as a dean. Most also have several assistant, associate, or vice deans (such as an associate dean of academics or an associate dean of students). The American Bar Association regulations on the operation of law schools, which must be followed for such institutions to receive and maintain ABA accreditation, define the role of the law school dean. These regulations specify that "A law school shall have a full-time dean, selected by the governing board or its designee, to whom the dean shall be responsible." Thus, a law school dean may not merely be a professor selected by fellow professors, nor even by the president of the university, as is often the case with university departments.

A 1977 article, Law School Deans: A Self-Portrait, describes appointment as dean of a law school as "a great honor... often the pinnacle of the career of one who has labored long in the academic legal community. Upon appointment, the law dean becomes a leader among leaders". The article further proposes that persons holding this office "have the opportunity to act out nearly any part they desire to act out", whether that be as a "prime mover, or... guard of the status quo... a trailblazer or weather vane; a builder or a mere housekeeper". In 1980, Jeffrey and Thomas O'Connell published The Five Roles of the Law School Dean: Leader, Manager, Energizer, Envoy, Intellectual, the authors identified five functions that must be undertaken by those holding the position. Boston College Law School interim dean James Rogers noted, "[i]n general, to be a successful law school dean... you need to be a distinguished scholar", but lamented that the position itself "allows you very little time for those activities that led you to the job in the first place". In particular, law school deans are also widely expected to engage in fundraising activities.

In order to advance the interests of their institutions, law school deans must generally "maintain a positive relation with the state supreme court, the bar examiners, and other organized bar leaders who exercise some power to regulate law schools". More recently, fundraising has become a critical element of the profession, with Harvard Law School dean Robert C. Clark observing in 1998 that fundraising had gone from almost a nonexistent activity to taking up a third of his time, also stating that as a law school dean, "[y]ou've got to be the CEO of a large administrative staff... while being an intellectual, a political leader, and a fund-raiser". University of South Dakota School of Law dean Thomas Geu wrote an article comparing a law school deanship to a complicated game in which the dean must marshal and hold onto resources which will be meagerly awarded for feats like increasing bar exam scores or negotiating an amicable collective bargaining agreement with the faculty, but removed in much larger measure if bar exam scores fall or if the collective bargaining agreement is reached acrimoniously.

== Tenure ==
The average tenure of a law school dean has declined over time. In 1987, it was noted that "the average deanship tenure is less than four years", a trend that continued into the 2010s, with the average tenure as of 2017 being 3.66 years. This contrasted with the experience of prior eras, in which the average tenure of a law school dean was 12 years. In 2021, National Jurist Magazine reported that the average tenure was 4.1 years, noting that only 11 of the hundreds of law school deans then serving had served in that position in a single institution for longer than ten years, and that Brad Toben, dean of Baylor Law School, was by far the longest-serving, having been in that office for over 29 years. At that time, two dozen law school deans had cumulative decanal service of over ten years, across multiple different law schools.
