= Leonard Strickman =

American legal scholar (born 1942)

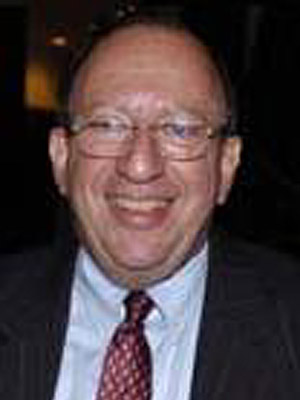

Dean of the Florida International University College of Law
- In office 2000–2009
- Preceded by: Office Created
- Succeeded by: Alexander Acosta

Personal details
- Born: April 14, 1942 (age 83) Brooklyn, New York, U.S.
- Education: University of Rochester (BA); Yale University (JD)
- Occupation: Law professor

Leonard P. Strickman (born April 14, 1942) is an American law professor who served as Dean of three law schools, guiding two of them to various stages of ABA accreditation. Most recently, he was the founding Dean of the Florida International University College of Law, which went from establishment to full accreditation during his tenure.

== Early life, education, and career ==
Born and raised in Brooklyn, New York, his father was a chemist who had lacked the means to go to medical school, and hoped to see one of his sons receive a medical degree. Strickman therefore entered college as a pre-med student, but found himself instead drawn to the study of law. Strickman received a B.A. in history from the University of Rochester, with honors, and a J.D. from Yale Law School in 1966, where he served as member of the Board of Editors on the Yale Law Journal.

His entered his first academic position in 1966 at Boston University School of Law, which he left to spend two years as Minority Counsel to the United States Senate Select Committee on Equal Education Opportunity, from 1970 to 1972. He then returned to teaching law at the Boston College Law School for nine years. While teaching there, Strickman correctly predicted that the United States Supreme Court would rule against Richard Nixon on Nixon's efforts to withhold the Nixon White House tapes. In 1974, Strickman filed a friend of the court brief in favor of desegregation busing in Detroit. He continued to advise various committees of the United States Senate and the city of Boston, and was a visiting scholar on the University of Cambridge Faculty of Law in 1979.

== Deanships ==
In 1981, Strickman was appointed Dean and Professor at the Northern Illinois University College of Law, where he remained for the next nine years, leading the law school from provisional to full American Bar Association accreditation and membership in the Association of American Law Schools. During that time, he fought a state legislative effort to eliminate the law school as a cost-saving measure. Strickman stepped down from the deanship in 1990, returning to teaching as a law professor at NIU after spending the fall 1990 semester as a visiting professor at the University of California, Hastings College of Law. In the spring of 1991, Strickman accepted an offer to serve as Dean of the University of Arkansas School of Law. In 1995, Strickman commented on the unease UA students had with respect to employment opportunities with the Rose Law Firm, which had come under heavy scrutiny during the Clinton Administration for its ties to Hillary Clinton. He also expressed doubt that a 1998 effort by critics to curtail Special Prosecutor Ken Starr would be found to have standing. Strickman remained at UA for eight years, during which time he spent six years on the ABA Accreditation Committee. In the 1980s and 1990s, he chaired fifteen accreditation site visits for the ABA. Strickman was one of two front-runners considered for the deanship of the Detroit College of Law in 2000.

In 2000, Strickman was selected to lead the newly-established Florida International University College of Law, taking office in January, 2001 and helping to position the school to appeal to the region's Hispanic population and to blue-collar families not necessarily able to afford to attend private law schools in the area. He successfully guided the law school to provisional accreditation at the earliest possible time, in August 2004, and to full accreditation in December 2006. Following the success of FIU Law, the New England School of Law hired Strickman to conduct an analysis of plans by the neighboring University of Massachusetts to establish a law school; Strickman concluded that the proposed program would cost more than what the University of Massachusetts expected. Strickman weighed in on the question again four years later, with a letter to the UMass trustees again questioning the financial feasibility of the proposed effort. Florida International University School of Law received an initial third-tier ranking in its first year of eligibility in the U.S. News & World Report in 2007. Strickman stepped down from the deanship at FIU in 2009, remaining at the school as a professor.

== Personal life ==
Strickman married Danielle Dana of Newton, Massachusetts on June 30, 1968.
