= U.S. Century Bank =

Community bank in the U.S. state of Florida

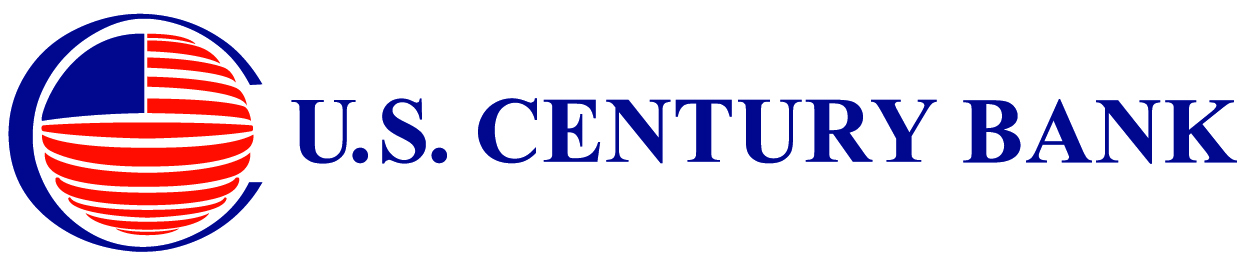
- Type: Public
- Traded as: Nasdaq: USCB
- Industry: Banking; Financial services Investment services
- Founded: October 28, 2002; 23 years ago, in Miami, Florida
- Headquarters: Doral, Florida
- Area served: South Florida
- Key people: Luis de la Aguilera (president, CEO and chairman of the board)
- Products: Finance; Consumer Banking; Corporate Banking; Global Banking; Homeowners Association
- Total assets: ▲US$ 3.0 billion (June 2026)
- Total equity: ▲US$ 233.2 million (June 2026)
- Number of employees: 216 (June 2026)
- Website: uscentury.com

U.S. Century Bank is a community bank in Miami-Dade County, Florida, with headquarters in the city of Doral. U.S. Century Bank is a Minority Depository Institution (MDI) operating in South Florida. As of June 2026, it has $3.0 billion in total assets, $233.2 million in equity capital, and a branch network that includes 10 locations in Miami-Dade and Broward counties. It is a member of the Federal Deposit Insurance Corporation and rated five stars by Bauer Financial.

== History ==
Since 2020

U.S. Century Bank was ranked as the eighth largest community bank in South Florida by assets on June 30, 2022. The bank participated in efforts to distribute federal Paycheck Protection Program loans, processing over $168 million in loans that supported South Florida small minority businesses during the COVID-19 pandemic crisis.

On July 16, 2021, Miami community bank U.S. Century Bank files for a $40 million IPO. The Miami, Florida–based company plans to raise $40 million by offering 3.6 million shares at a price range of $10.00 to $12.50. At the midpoint of the proposed range, U.S. Century Bank would command a fully diluted market value of $201 million.

On July 22, 2021, the initial public offering was priced at $10.00 per share. The shares began trading on July 23, 2021, on the Nasdaq Global Market under the symbol "USCB".

On July 28, 2022, the bank surpassed $2.0 billion in assets

USCB Financial Holdings and its wholly owned bank subsidiary, U.S. Century Bank, announced in June 2023 the appointment of Luis de la Aguilera to succeed Aida Levitan, Ph.D. as chairman of the board of directors for both the company and the bank.

Early years

U.S. Century Bank, which has a majority Hispanic board of directors, was established in 2002 with $23 million in capital to provide financial services to Hispanic-owned businesses. Through organic growth, the bank rose to $2 billion in assets by 2009.

During the economic downturn in 2009, the bank participated in the United States Department of the Treasury's Troubled Asset Relief Program (TARP) Capital Purchase Program, receiving $5. In 2011, the U.S. Treasury appointed a federal observer to the bank's board after the bank missed eight TARP dividend payments. The FDIC in 2011 issued a consent order citing issues with asset quality, management, earnings, capital, liquidity and sensitivity to market risk. U.S. Century regained profitability in 2010 and closed 2011 with $1.26 billion in deposits and $1.11 billion in loans.

On December 12, 2013, U.S. Century Bank named former U.S. Attorney for the Southern District of Florida R. Alexander Acosta as chairman. Acosta was head prosecutor in the region from 2005 until 2009, after which he accepted the position of dean at Florida International University’s law school.

U.S. Century Bank announced the closing of its $65 million re-capitalization on March 18, 2015, after two previous attempts. It announced regulatory approval on Feb. 20, 2015, and gained shareholders’ approval on March 9, 2015.

The bank’s executive management turned over in December 2015 when Luis de la Aguilera, former head of TotalBank, was appointed president and chief executive officer. In April 2016, after the changes in management and restructuring of the bank’s loan portfolio, the bank returned to profitability and the FDIC lifted the regulatory consent order under which the bank had been operating.

The board of directors named Aida Levitan, Ph.D., as chairman of the board in 2017, replacing Alexander Acosta, who had been confirmed as U.S. secretary of labor on April 27, 2017, by the U.S. Senate.

== Officers ==
- Luis De La Aguilera, president & CEO, chairman of the Board of Directors

== Board Members ==
- Luis De La Aguilera, Chairman, president and CEO, U.S. Century Bank
- Aida Levitan, Ph.D., APR, President of the Levitan Group, Inc.
- Howard Feinglass, managing partner, Priam Capital
- Ramón A. Abadin, partner, at Ramon A. Abadin P.A
- Bernardo B. Fernandez, M.D., Corporate Physician Executive of Broward Health
- Ramon A. Rodriguez, CPA, former chairman and CEO, Cable Insurance Company
- Robert (Bob) Kafafian, executive advisor, Wolf & Company
- Maria C. Alonso, director, Axxes Capital
- Ramon M. Rodriguez, former market president Seacoast Bank

== Branches ==
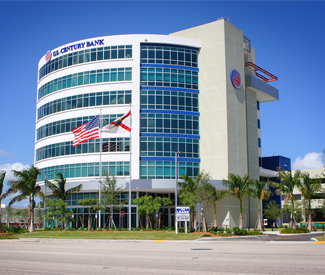
U.S. Century Bank Headquarters, Doral, Florida

The Bank operates 10 branches located throughout Miami-Dade and Broward counties in South Florida. Deposits are insured by the Federal Deposit Insurance Corporation (FDIC) up to the legal limit. U.S. Century Bank's branches are located in Aventura, Coral Gables, Doral, Hialeah, Hialeah Gardens, Hollywood, Miami (4) and Miami Lakes.
