= Florida International University College of Law =

Coordinates: 25.75690°N 80.37780°W

FIU College of Law
- Established: 2000; 26 years ago
- School type: Public
- Parent endowment: $358 million
- Dean: Michelle D. Mason
- Location: University Park, Miami-Dade County, Florida, U.S.
- Enrollment: 460 (Fall 2018)
- Faculty: 47 (including part-time)
- USNWR ranking: 84th (tie) (2025)
- Bar pass rate: 82.6% (Florida bar exam, February 2024)
- Website: law.fiu.edu

{{Short description|Public law school in Miami, Florida,

The Florida International University College of Law is the law school of Florida International University, located in University Park, Miami-Dade County, Florida, United States. The law school is accredited by the American Bar Association, and is the only public law school in South Florida. FIU College of Law is the third highest ranked law school in the state of Florida. The College of Law had the highest July bar exam passage rate in the state of Florida consecutively for eight years (2015–2023).

== History ==
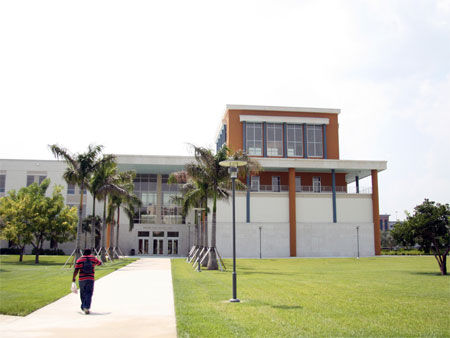
Rafael Diaz-Balart Hall, home of the FIU College of Law

Florida International University worked towards the creation of a public law school in South Florida for many years, beginning with the 1986 appointment of Modesto A. Maidique as University president. Maidique met resistance from the Florida Board of Regents, which had a number of graduates of other Florida law schools, and opposed the opening of any new public law schools in the state. The establishment of this institution was finally realized in 2000, when Governor Jeb Bush pushed the project through the state legislature, along with the re-establishment of a law school at Florida A&M University.

Shortly thereafter, the College of Law hired Leonard Strickman as its inaugural Dean. Strickman, a Yale Law School graduate, had previously served as Dean of the Northern Illinois University College of Law and the University of Arkansas School of Law, and had been a member of the ABA Accreditation Committee during the 1990s, and had chaired 15 ABA accreditation site visits.

The College of Law is one of the university's 26 schools and colleges and was founded in 2000. It officially opened its doors in August 2002, received provisional accreditation from the American Bar Association in August 2004, and was granted full accreditation on December 1, 2006. The inaugural class graduated on May 22, 2005.

On February 10, 2007, the new law school building, the Rafael Diaz-Balart Hall, was dedicated.

In May 2009, the institution announced that U.S. attorney for the Southern District of Florida Alexander Acosta had been selected to replace Strickman as Dean, with the latter's retirement from the position. Acosta left in 2017 to become United States Secretary of Labor.

== Rankings and reputation ==
The 2026 U.S. News & World Report's "Best Law School Rankings" ranked the FIU College of Law 77th (tied) out of 196 in the United States. It ranked 40th among public law schools in the nation.

== Employment ==
According to FIU's official 2024 ABA-required disclosures, 90.6% of the Class of 2024 obtained full-time, long-term, JD-required or JD Advantage employment ten months after graduation. FIU's Law School Transparency under-employment score was 7%, indicating the percentage of the Class of 2024 unemployed, pursuing an additional degree, or working in a non-professional, short-term, or part-time job ten months after graduation.

== Exam passage ==
In terms of percentage of students who pass on the first attempt, FIU Law has ranked in the top three among Florida law schools for every administration of the Florida Bar Exam since July 2015 (ranking first 13 out of 19 times).

Florida Bar Exam passing rates
Bar exam date	Bar passing rate
February 2020	81.8% (2nd in Florida)
October 2020	89.3% (1st in Florida)
February 2021	75.0% (2nd in Florida)
July 2021	88.8% (1st in Florida)
February 2022	70.8% (3rd in Florida)
July 2022	81.2% (1st in Florida)
February 2023	72.2% (1st in Florida)
July 2023	91.1% (1st in Florida)
February 2024	82.6% (1st in Florida)

== Admissions and tuition ==
FIU College of Law admissions
	2025	2024	2023	2022	2021
Applicants	3,100	2,667	2,121	2,183	2,364
Admits	582	561	534	482	486
% Admitted	18.7	21.0	25.1	22.6	20.5

This table does not account deferred applications or other unique situations.

The College of Law only admits students during the fall to its full-time day program or its part-time evening program. Admissions is done on a rolling basis.

For Fall 2025, 3,100 students applied for admissions into the FIU College of Law, 582 were accepted, and 175 enrolled. The Fall 2025 entering class had a median LSAT score of 161 and a median 3.80 GPA (on a 4.0 scale). 61.7% of students were ethnic minorities.

Annual tuition for in-state students in the day program is $21,407 and $14,501 for those in the evening program. Annual tuition for out-of-state students in the day program is $35,650 and $24,150 for those in the evening program.

== Specialty programs ==
=== Specialty programs ===
- International and Comparative Law Program
- Legal Skills and Values Board
- Moot Court Board of Appellate Advocates
- Community Service Board
- Trial Advocacy Program
- Intellectual Property Certificate
- Environmental & Natural Resources Law Certificate

== Faculty ==
The FIU College of Law has about 35-40 full-time faculty members (including the Dean and the Associate Dean for Academics, both of whom teach on an occasional basis), and also has various visiting professors who teach subjects within their areas of expertise.

=== Founding faculty ===
The founding faculty are the professors who came to the university before it was opened to students. They included:

- Thomas E. Baker, professor of Constitutional law
- Elizabeth Price Foley, professor of civil procedure and Constitutional law.
- Ediberto Roman, professor of contract law, and author of numerous articles and a book on the disenfranchisement of residents of the United States' inhabited insular possessions

In addition, Professor John Stack, already a long-time professor of political science at FIU before the foundation of the law school, and director of the Jack D. Gordon Public Policy Institute, became a jointly-appointed faculty member in the College of Law and the Political Science department.

=== Notable faculty ===
- Stanley Fish (former faculty) was hired to a five-year contract, as the Davidson-Kahn Distinguished University Professor of Humanities and Law in June 2005.
- Jerry W. Markham wrote textbooks on various topics, including on the history of securities regulation, before coming to FIU. He teaches in the areas of business organization, banking, securities, international litigation, and international business transactions.
- Henry Latimer (deceased) also a visiting professor who taught Alternative Dispute Resolution, was formerly a judge, and was in line to become the first African-American president of the Florida Bar Association when he was killed in a car accident in spring 2005.

=== Notable adjunct faculty ===
- Adalberto Jordan judge of the United States Court of Appeals for the Eleventh Circuit
- Robert N. Scola Jr. (former adjunct faculty) judge of the United States District Court for the Southern District of Florida
- Larry R Leiby teaches construction law and commercial arbitration

== Students ==
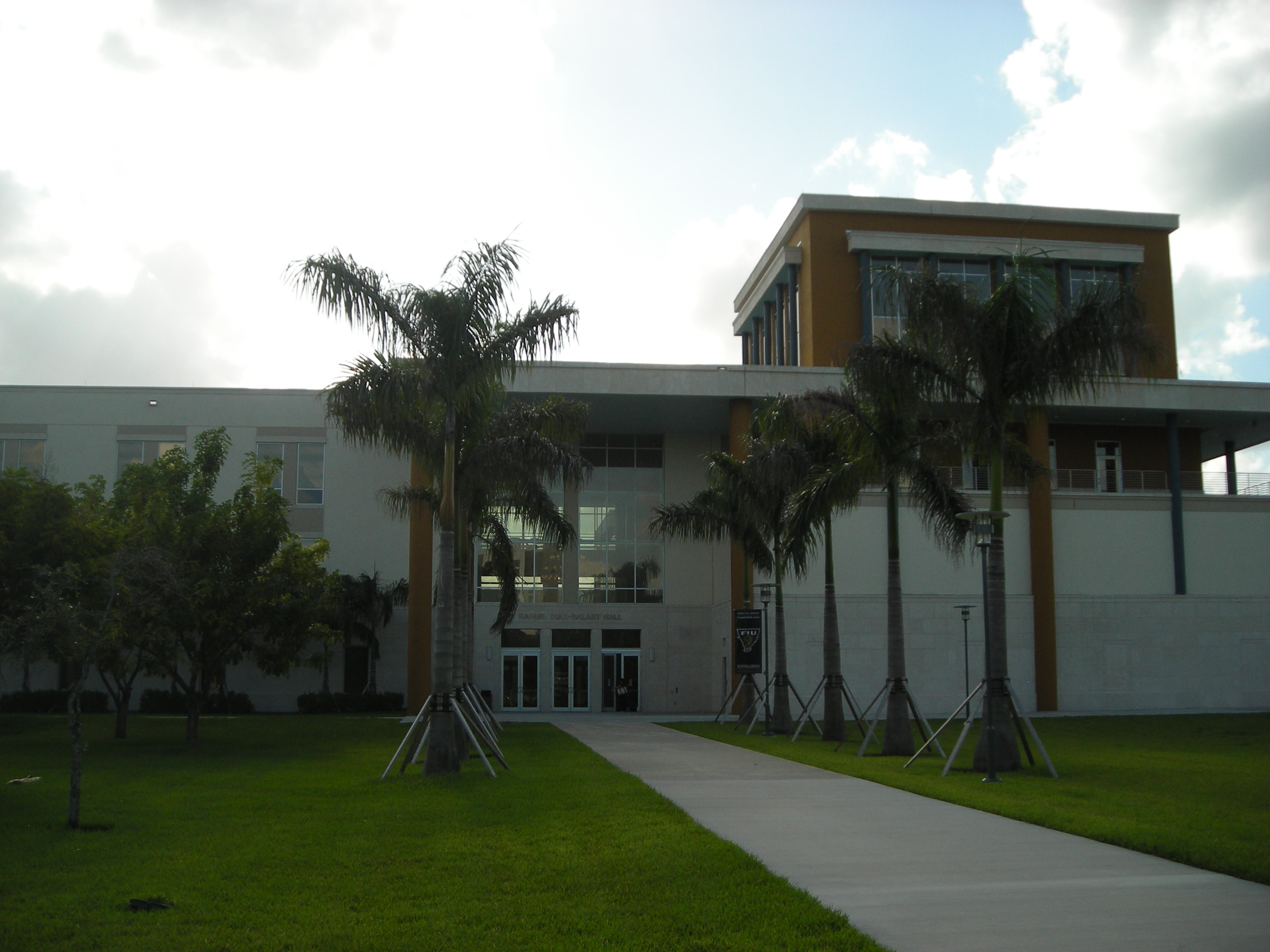
A view of the main entrance to Rafael Díaz-Balart Hall, home of the FIU College of Law.

The Florida International University College of Law opened with a class of 67 full-time and 60 part-time students. LSAT and GPA scores placed the inaugural class around the middle of Florida's 11 law schools. The first graduate was Rosann Spiegel, also a previous FIU alumnus, who finished the program a semester ahead of schedule. Spiegel graduated in December 2004 and passed the February 2005 bar examination - briefly making FIU the only law school in the country with a 100% bar passage rate.

In January 2010, FIU College of Law students placed first among the Southeastern States Regional American Bar Association negotiation competition. Students also placed second in the Zehmer Mock Trial Competition and second on the brief at the Skadden Arps International FDI moot competition.

The student body has also formed two Law Reviews and a Moot Court team, as well as a Student Bar Association and other student organizations, such as a chapter of the Federalist Society, a student newspaper called "Ipsissima Verba", and a Sports and Entertainment Law Society (SELS). Currently, the institution has about 450 students, including part-time and full-time first, second, and third year students.

== Law journals ==
=== FIU Law Review ===
Established in 2004, the FIU Law Review is the law school's official student law review. The FIU Law Review is committed to facilitate FIU Law's growth and impact in the legal community.

The Review organizes two symposia and publishes two symposium-based issues annually (Fall and Spring). Articles Editors and Staff Members also write about current changes in the law on the Law Review’s blog.

=== FIU World Arbitration and Mediation Review ===
The FIU World Arbitration and Mediation Review ("WAMR") was established to provide a contemporary resource for arbitrators and mediators.

== Curriculum ==
The FIU College of Law requires all students to take a course entitled An Introduction to International and Comparative Law during their first year. Other required first year courses are more typical - Constitutional law, Torts, and Contracts in the first semester, Criminal law, Civil Procedure, and Property in the second, and legal writing classes (called Legal Skills and Values, or simply LSV) throughout. However, each of the substantive classes also dedicates a portion of its discussion to international and comparative issues in that area of law.

Upper level requirements also include an additional course relating to international law, an additional LSV class, a writing seminar, and a course in Professional Responsibility.

== Clinical programs ==
The FIU College of Law offers six in-house clinics:

- The Carlos A. Costa Immigration and Human Rights Clinic
- The Community Development Clinic
- Consumer Bankruptcy Clinic
- Family Law and Education Advocacy Clinic
- The H.E.L.P. (Health, Ethics, Law and Policy) Clinic, and the Education Advocacy Clinic.
- The Immigrant Children's Justice Clinic
- The Investor Advocacy Clinic

== Facilities ==
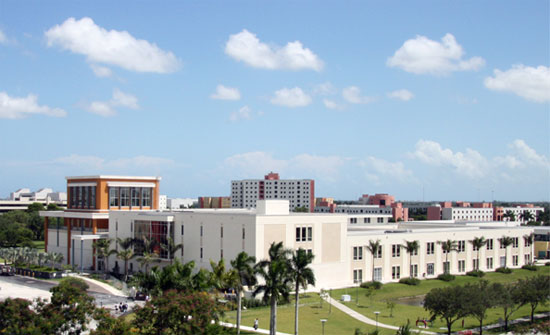
Rafael Díaz-Balart Hall

The Florida International University College of Law operates out of the Rafael Díaz-Ballart Hall, designed by architect Robert A. M. Stern. A groundbreaking ceremony was held for the law school's building on May 22, 2005 (the same day as the inaugural commencement). $34 million was budgeted for the construction of the facility. The new building is also on the University Park campus, across from the FIU Arena and adjacent to the Recreation Center and a 1,000-car parking garage.

On-campus housing is available for graduate students in the College of Law at the University Park Towers and the University Park Apartments through the graduate housing community.
