= Senator Frerichs =

Senator Frerichs may refer to:

- Jason Frerichs (born 1984), South Dakota State Senate
- Mike Frerichs (born 1973), Illinois State Senate
