= 2014 United States House of Representatives election in South Dakota =

2014 United States House of Representatives election in South Dakota's at-large district
- November 4, 2014
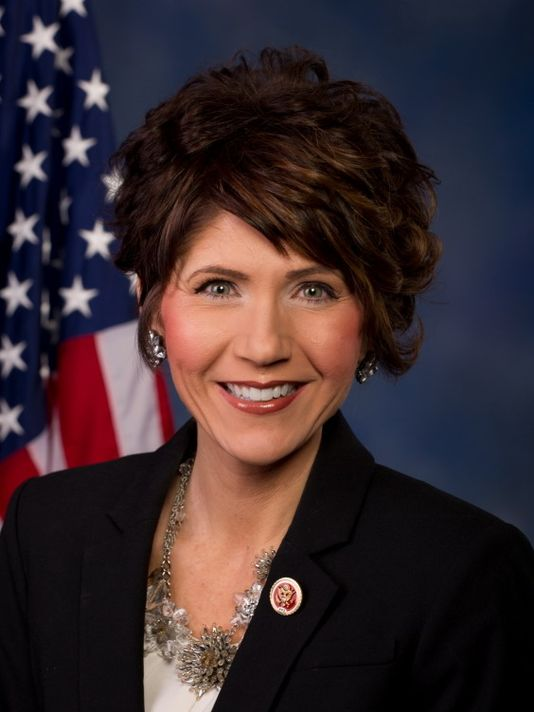

Nominee	Kristi Noem	Corinna Robinson
Party	Republican	Democratic
Popular vote	183,834	92,485
Percentage	66.53%	33.47%
- Noem: 50–60% 60–70% 70–80% 80–90% >90% Robinson: 50–60% 60–70% 70–80% 80–90% Tie: 50%
U.S. Representative before election
Kristi Noem
Republican
Elected U.S. Representative
Kristi Noem
Republican

The 2014 United States House of Representatives election in South Dakota was held on Tuesday, November 4, 2014, to elect the U.S. representative from South Dakota's at-large congressional district, who would represent the state of South Dakota in the 114th United States Congress. The election coincided with the elections of a U.S. senator from South Dakota, the governor of South Dakota, and other federal and state offices. Incumbent Republican U.S. Representative Kristi Noem won reelection.

== Republican nomination ==
=== Candidates ===
==== Declared ====
- Kristi Noem, incumbent U.S. representative

== Democratic nomination ==
=== Candidates ===
==== Declared ====
- Corinna Robinson, retired Army officer and Iraq War veteran

==== Declined ====
- Steve Jarding, educator, lecturer and political consultant

== Independents and third parties ==
=== Candidates ===
==== Failed to make the ballot ====
- Charles "Chuck" Haan (Constitution), Independent candidate for the State House in 2000

==== Withdrew ====
- Lori Stacey (Constitution), nominee for Secretary of State of South Dakota in 2010 (ran for secretary of state)

== General election ==
=== Predictions ===
Source	Ranking	As of
The Cook Political Report	Safe R	November 3, 2014
Rothenberg	Safe R	October 24, 2014
Sabato's Crystal Ball	Safe R	October 30, 2014
RCP	Safe R	November 2, 2014
Daily Kos Elections	Safe R	November 4, 2014

=== Polling ===
Poll source	Date(s) administered	Sample size	Margin of error	Kristi Noem (R)	Corinna Robinson (D)	Other	Undecided
Monmouth University	October 24–27, 2014	429	± 4.7%	61%	34%	—	5%
SurveyUSA	October 21–26, 2014	611	± 4%	55%	39%	—	6%
Mason Dixon	October 20–23, 2014	800	± 3.5%	56%	35%	—	9%
CBS/NYT/YouGov	October 16–23, 2014	527	± 8%	51%	35%	1%	15%
SurveyUSA	October 1–5, 2014	616	± 4%	55%	37%	—	7%
Nielson Brothers Polling	September 21–25, 2014	574	± 4.05%	55%	37%	—	9%
SurveyUSA	September 3–7, 2014	510	± 4.4%	53%	40%	—	6%
Nielson Brothers Polling	July 23–28, 2014	574	± 4.06%	54%	36%	—	10%

=== Results ===
2014 South Dakota's at-large congressional district election
Party	Candidate	Votes	%	±%
Republican	Kristi Noem (incumbent)	183,834	66.53%	+9.08%
Democratic	Corinna Robinson	92,485	33.47%	−9.08%
Total votes		276,319	100.00%	N/A
Republican hold				

==== By county ====
County	Kristi Noem Republican		Corinna Robinson Democratic		Margin		Total
County	#	%	#	%	#	%	Total
Aurora	794	69.65%	346	30.35%	448	39.30%	1,140
Beadle	3,710	66.40%	1,877	33.60%	1,833	32.81%	5,587
Bennett	585	62.37%	353	37.63%	232	24.73%	938
Bon Homme	1,631	68.13%	763	31.87%	868	36.26%	2,394
Brookings	5,559	60.41%	3,643	39.59%	1,916	20.82%	9,202
Brown	7,128	59.73%	4,805	40.27%	2,323	19.47%	11,933
Brule	1,265	71.88%	495	28.13%	770	43.75%	1,760
Buffalo	172	37.97%	281	62.03%	-109	-24.06%	453
Butte	2,521	78.86%	676	21.14%	1,845	57.71%	3,197
Campbell	529	84.64%	96	15.36%	433	69.28%	625
Charles Mix	2,130	66.85%	1,056	33.15%	1,074	33.71%	3,186
Clark	1,043	69.35%	461	30.65%	582	38.70%	1,504
Clay	1,851	49.68%	1,875	50.32%	-24	-0.64%	3,726
Codington	6,105	67.21%	2,979	32.79%	3,126	34.41%	9,084
Corson	520	56.71%	397	43.29%	123	13.41%	917
Custer	2,713	72.99%	1,004	27.01%	1,709	45.98%	3,717
Davison	4,214	69.90%	1,815	30.10%	2,399	39.79%	6,029
Day	1,312	54.74%	1,085	45.26%	227	9.47%	2,397
Deuel	1,184	66.74%	590	33.26%	594	33.48%	1,774
Dewey	651	44.02%	828	55.98%	-177	-11.97%	1,479
Douglas	1,119	85.49%	190	14.51%	929	70.97%	1,309
Edmunds	1,250	73.36%	454	26.64%	796	46.71%	1,704
Fall River	2,262	77.18%	669	22.82%	1,593	54.35%	2,931
Faulk	669	76.11%	210	23.89%	459	52.22%	879
Grant	1,981	68.62%	906	31.38%	1,075	37.24%	2,887
Gregory	1,373	75.73%	440	24.27%	933	51.46%	1,813
Haakon	764	88.94%	95	11.06%	669	77.88%	859
Hamlin	1,639	73.43%	593	26.57%	1,046	46.86%	2,232
Hand	1,120	75.07%	372	24.93%	748	50.13%	1,492
Hanson	1,009	75.69%	324	24.31%	685	51.39%	1,333
Harding	558	91.63%	51	8.37%	507	83.25%	609
Hughes	4,889	71.23%	1,975	28.77%	2,914	42.45%	6,864
Hutchinson	2,206	79.84%	557	20.16%	1,649	59.68%	2,763
Hyde	457	75.66%	147	24.34%	310	51.32%	604
Jackson	643	70.12%	274	29.88%	369	40.24%	917
Jerauld	557	66.95%	275	33.05%	282	33.89%	832
Jones	398	85.04%	70	14.96%	328	70.09%	468
Kingsbury	1,372	65.40%	726	34.60%	646	30.79%	2,098
Lake	3,175	65.75%	1,654	34.25%	1,521	31.50%	4,829
Lawrence	6,168	69.50%	2,707	30.50%	3,461	39.00%	8,875
Lincoln	11,837	70.51%	4,951	29.49%	6,886	41.02%	16,788
Lyman	826	66.88%	409	33.12%	417	33.77%	1,235
Marshall	1,022	59.38%	699	40.62%	323	18.77%	1,721
McCook	1,452	71.07%	591	28.93%	861	42.14%	2,043
McPherson	830	81.93%	183	18.07%	647	63.87%	1,013
Meade	6,410	77.09%	1,905	22.91%	4,505	54.18%	8,315
Mellette	426	63.39%	246	36.61%	180	26.79%	672
Miner	586	67.36%	284	32.64%	302	34.71%	870
Minnehaha	33,281	61.86%	20,520	38.14%	12,761	23.72%	53,801
Moody	1,471	62.02%	901	37.98%	570	24.03%	2,372
Pennington	23,350	69.75%	10,125	30.25%	13,225	39.51%	33,475
Perkins	1,113	83.37%	222	16.63%	891	66.74%	1,335
Potter	931	80.40%	227	19.60%	704	60.79%	1,158
Roberts	1,819	56.54%	1,398	43.46%	421	13.09%	3,217
Sanborn	626	72.37%	239	27.63%	387	44.74%	865
Shannon	507	18.44%	2,243	81.56%	-1,736	-63.13%	2,750
Spink	1,648	65.45%	870	34.55%	778	30.90%	2,518
Stanley	950	74.86%	319	25.14%	631	49.72%	1,269
Sully	545	79.91%	137	20.09%	408	59.82%	682
Todd	632	29.25%	1,529	70.75%	-897	-41.51%	2,161
Tripp	1,691	77.18%	500	22.82%	1,191	54.36%	2,191
Turner	2,339	71.59%	928	28.41%	1,411	43.19%	3,267
Union	3,693	72.47%	1,403	27.53%	2,290	44.94%	5,096
Walworth	1,489	77.59%	430	22.41%	1,059	55.18%	1,919
Yankton	4,778	62.67%	2,846	37.33%	1,932	25.34%	7,624
Ziebach	346	54.92%	284	45.08%	62	9.84%	630
Totals	183,834	66.53%	92,485	33.47%	91,349	33.06%	276,319

==== Counties that flipped from Democratic to Republican ====
- Brookings (largest city: Brookings)
- Brown (largest city: Aberdeen)
- Day (largest city: Webster)
- Marshall (largest city: Britton)
- Roberts (largest city: Sisseton)
- Yankton (largest city: Yankton)
- Ziebach (largest city: Dupree)

== See also ==
- United States Senate election in South Dakota, 2014
- 2014 South Dakota gubernatorial election
- 2014 United States Senate elections
- 2014 United States elections
