= 2018 South Dakota gubernatorial election =

- November 6, 2018
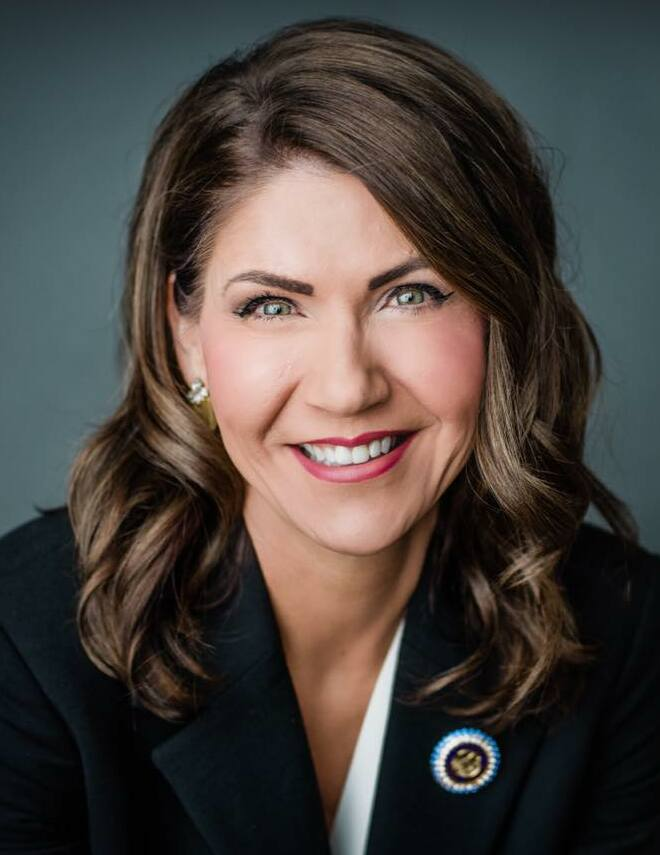

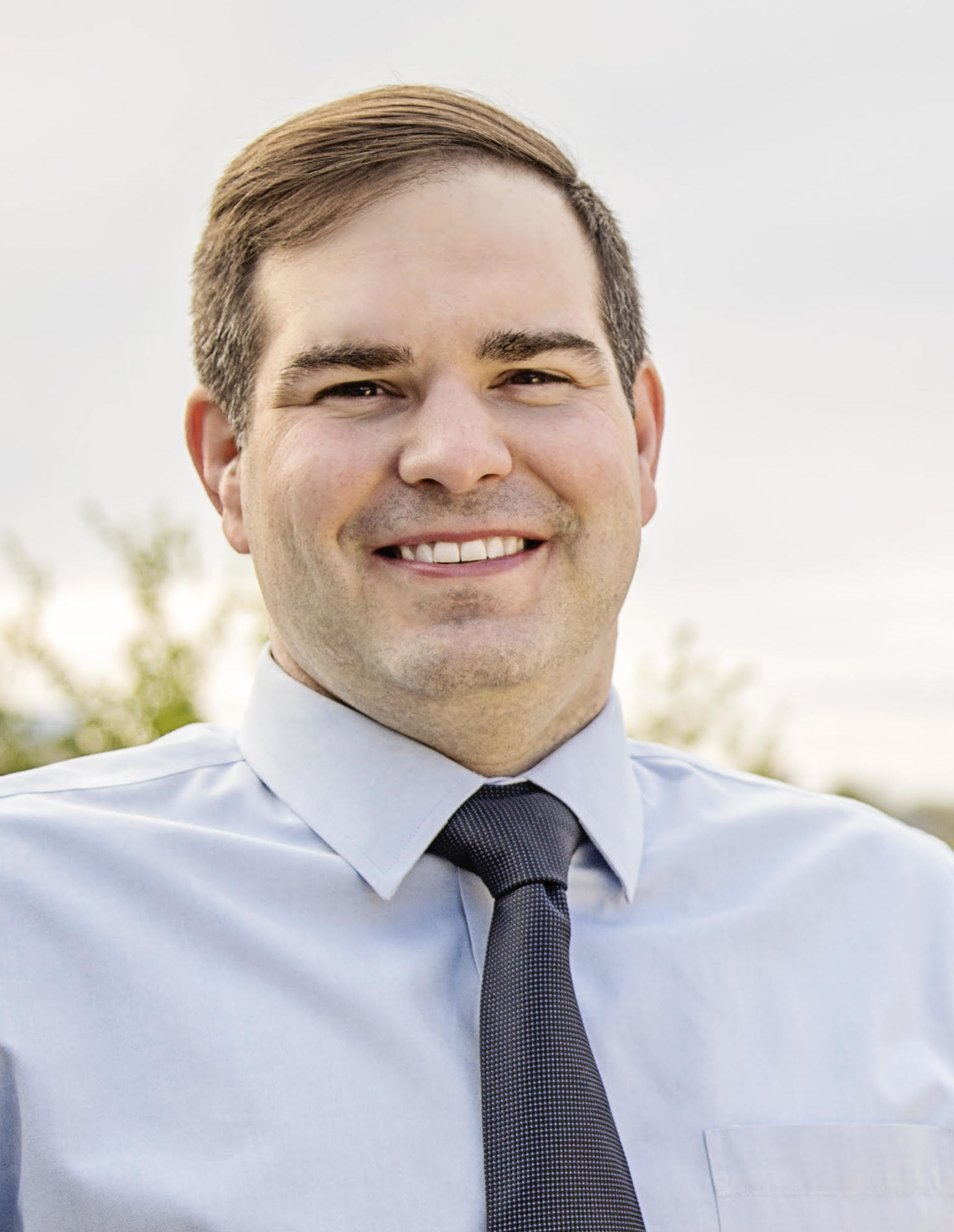
Nominee	Kristi Noem	Billie Sutton
Party	Republican	Democratic
Running mate	Larry Rhoden	Michelle Lavallee
Popular vote	172,912	161,454
Percentage	50.97%	47.60%
- Noem: 40–50% 50–60% 60–70% 70–80% 80–90% >90% Sutton: 40–50% 50–60% 60–70% 70–80% 80–90% >90% Tie: 40–50%
Governor before election
Dennis Daugaard
Republican
Elected Governor
Kristi Noem
Republican

The 2018 South Dakota gubernatorial election took place on November 6, 2018, to elect the next governor of South Dakota. Incumbent Republican governor Dennis Daugaard was term-limited and could not seek a third consecutive term.

Republican candidate Kristi Noem won against Democratic candidate Billie Sutton in the closest gubernatorial election in South Dakota history. Noem also became the first female governor of the state. Her victory extended the longest active hold on a governorship by one party; the GOP had won every gubernatorial election in South Dakota starting in 1978. Conversely, Noem's vote percentage of 51.0% was the worst performance for any Republican gubernatorial candidate in the state since 1974, while Sutton's 47.6% was the best for any Democratic candidate since 1986.

== Republican primary ==
=== Candidates ===
==== Declared ====
- Marty Jackley, attorney general of South Dakota
- Kristi Noem, U.S. representative, former state representative

==== Failed to qualify for primary ballot ====
- Lora Hubbel, former state representative, Republican candidate for governor in 2014

==== Declined ====
- Matt Michels, lieutenant governor of South Dakota
- Mark Mickelson, speaker of the South Dakota House of Representatives

=== Debates ===
Jackley and Noem participated in three debates.

==== First debate ====
In the first debate, both candidates tried to define the other. Jackley stated: "It’s Washington experience versus South Dakota experience." Noem said, "Marty’s background has been being a government lawyer."

==== Second debate ====
In the second debate, Noem discussed Jackley's scandals. "In EB5, the state oversight program, nobody went to jail. On Gear-Up, still, nobody's been punished. When we talk about what's been going on in Brookings with the Global Aquaponics scam—a con artist, Tobias Ritesman, held a fundraiser for Marty Jackley. Marty attended his phony groundbreaking for his phony project," Noem said. "People lost hundreds of thousands of dollars. Still, nobody's been investigated and nobody’s been prosecuted. That needs to change in our state."

Jackley was on the defensive during the second debate. "Congresswoman, he didn’t hold a fundraiser for me. I was at an event that he was at, and I did go to a ground breaking because that's what important in South Dakota," Jackley says. "When we have businesses expanding I think it’s important that we attend those. You talk about Gear-Up, there hasn’t been a sentencing because these defendants are presumed innocent. But I as attorney general, unlike Washington, have done something about it. I actually formed a grand jury. Indictments have been issued. They're schedule to begin jury trials in July—or, excuse me—June, June 26th and I plan on trying those personally, because that’s what a leader does."

==== Final debate ====
In the final debate, Jackley and Noem took tough questions about workforce development, anti-discrimination laws, drugs, uniting Democrats and Republicans in the state to make critical decisions and much more. While they spent a lot of time talking about their plans for the state, they also spent a lot of time attacking each other's records.

A major topic of contention was boards and commissions. The state currently has 134 of them. Noem said she wants to streamline different processes for licensure, eliminating "red tape" but Jackley disagreed. "Every time that a proposal comes forward to create a new 'blue ribbon' task force, a board or a commission, what typically comes with that is another layer of bureaucracy," Noem said. Jackley defended the government bureaucracy. "We need a governor that understands that various different boards, isn't out there criticizing different boards and saying that type of service isn't important," Jackley said. Jackley spoke about putting together a task force to work on government transparency and open records laws. "I'm committed when I become governor to put forth a taskforce ...because we need to take a look at the open records law," he said.

Each candidate closed the debate with a final jab at the other. "It really comes to down to Washington experience versus South Dakota experience," Jackley said. "The congresswoman has been spending considerable time and effort talking about Marty Jackley, but I'm talking about you, South Dakota." "Days ago he stood up and talked about protecting victims while behind the scenes he was actively working to silence one to further his political career," Noem said. "You deserve a governor who will be honest with you, who will tell you the truth and who is willing to be accountable."

=== Polling ===
Poll source	Date(s) administered	Sample size	Margin of error	Kristi Noem	Marty Jackley	Lora Hubbel	Terry LaFleur	Undecided
Mason-Dixon	May 21–23, 2018	625	± 4.5%	45%	44%	–	–	11%
Leverage Public Strategies	May 4–7, 2018	350	± 5.2%	38%	39%	–	–	24%
Clout Research (R)	April 21–23, 2018	815	± 3.4%	49%	37%	–	–	14%
Rockbridge Strategy (R)	April 4, 2018	500	± 2.9%	44%	33%	–	–	23%
Moore Information	February 8, 2018	300	± 6.0%	40%	35%	5%	2%	18%
New Age Consultants (R-LaFleur)	November 3, 2017	509	± 4.4%	22%	24%	–	3%	51%

=== Results ===
Results by county Noem: 50–60%; 60–70%; 70–80%; Jackley: 50–60%

Republican primary results
Party	Candidate	Votes	%
Republican	Kristi Noem	57,437	56.0%
Republican	Marty Jackley	45,069	44.0%
Total votes		102,506	100.0%

== Democratic primary ==
=== Candidates ===
==== Declared ====
- Billie Sutton, minority leader of the South Dakota Senate

==== Declined ====
- Stephanie Herseth Sandlin, former U.S. representative
- Mike Huether, mayor of Sioux Falls

== Libertarian Party ==
=== Candidates ===
==== Declared ====
- C.J. Abernathey
- Kurt Evans, former science teacher, Libertarian nominee for U.S. Senator in 2002

=== Results ===
Libertarian convention delegate vote results
Party	Candidate	Votes	%
Libertarian	Kurt Evans	10	62.5%
Libertarian	C.J. Abernathey	6	37.5%
Total votes		16	100.0%

== Constitution Party ==
Following an internal controversy within the Constitution Party of South Dakota over who was the legal party chair, Dan Lederman—individually and in his capacity as chair of the South Dakota Republican Party—sued Republican Secretary of State Shantel Krebs to prevent her from certifying any Constitution Party nominees for the general-election ballot. For somewhat complex reasons, state circuit Judge Patricia DeVaney ruled in favor of the Republican Party on August 17.

G. Matt Johnson and Lora Hubbel—Constitution Party nominees for the state's at-large U.S. House seat and governor respectively—then sued Krebs in federal court on August 29, seeking ballot access for themselves and four other Constitution Party nominees. For various procedural reasons, federal district Judge Roberto Lange ruled against the Constitution Party on October 1.

=== Candidates ===
==== Declared ====
- Lora Hubbel, former state representative, Republican candidate for governor in 2014
- Terry LaFleur

==== Withdrawn ====
- Rick Gortmaker

== Independents ==
=== Candidates ===
==== Declined ====
- Lora Hubbel, former state representative, Republican candidate for governor in 2014
- Mike Huether, mayor of Sioux Falls

== General election ==
=== Candidates ===
- Kurt Evans (Libertarian), 2002 nominee for U.S. senator
  - Running mate: Richard Shelatz, vice-chairman of the Libertarian Party of South Dakota
- Kristi Noem (Republican), U.S. representative, former state representative
  - Running mate: Larry Rhoden, state representative
- Billie Sutton (Democratic), minority leader of the South Dakota Senate
  - Running mate: Michelle Lavallee, businesswoman

=== Predictions ===
Source	Ranking	As of
The Cook Political Report	Tossup	October 26, 2018
The Washington Post	Tossup	November 5, 2018
FiveThirtyEight	Lean R	November 5, 2018
Rothenberg Political Report	Tilt R	November 1, 2018
Sabato's Crystal Ball	Lean R	November 5, 2018
RealClearPolitics	Tossup	November 4, 2018
Daily Kos	Lean R	November 5, 2018
Fox News (Note: The Fox News Midterm Power Rankings uniquely does not contain a category for Safe/Solid races.)	Lean R	November 5, 2018
Politico	Tossup	November 5, 2018
Governing	Tossup	November 5, 2018

=== Endorsements ===
Kristi Noem (R)

Federal officials

- Mike Pence, 48th vice president of the United States
- Mike Rounds, U.S. senator
- John Thune, U.S. senator
- Donald Trump, 45th president of the United States

State officials

- Dennis Daugaard, governor
- Marty Jackley, attorney general

Individuals

- Ivanka Trump, daughter of U.S. President Donald Trump

Organizations

- NRA Political Victory Fund
- South Dakota Right to Life
Billie Sutton (D)

Federal officials

- Larry Pressler, former U.S. senator (Republican)

State officials

- Stan Adelstein, former state senator (Republican)
- Mark DeVries, former state representative (Republican)
- Joyce Hodges, former state representative (Republican)
- Kay Jorgensen, former state representative (Republican)
- Dave Knudson, former majority leader of the South Dakota Senate (Republican)
- Dave Volk, former state treasurer (Republican)
- Dick Werner, former state representative (Republican)

County and local officials

- Rick Knobe, former mayor of Sioux Falls (Republican)
- Jim Schmidt, Lincoln County commissioner (Republican)
- Carol Twedt, former Minnehaha County commissioner (Republican)

Labor unions

- South Dakota Education Association

Organizations

- Great Plains Tribal Chairman's Association

Newspapers

- Rapid City Journal
- Sioux Falls Argus Leader

=== Polling ===
View source data.

Poll source	Date(s) administered	Sample size	Margin of error	Kristi Noem (R)	Billie Sutton (D)	Kurt Evans (L)	Other	Undecided
Change Research	November 2–4, 2018	851	–	45%	51%	2%	–	–
Emerson College	November 1–4, 2018	514	± 4.5%	48%	47%	–	1%	5%
Mason-Dixon	October 29–31, 2018	500	± 4.5%	47%	44%	1%	–	8%
Mason-Dixon	October 18–22, 2018	500	± 4.5%	45%	45%	1%	–	9%
ALG Research (D-Sutton)	September 20–24, 2018	500	± 4.4%	42%	45%	3%	–	10%
ALG Research (D-Sutton)	July 19–25, 2018	500	± 4.4%	46%	42%	–	–	13%
ALG Research (D-Sutton)	October 4–9, 2017	500	± 4.4%	53%	40%	–	–	–

=== Results ===
2018 South Dakota gubernatorial election
Party	Candidate	Votes	%	±%
Republican	Kristi Noem; Larry Rhoden	172,912	50.97%	−19.50%
Democratic	Billie Sutton; Michelle Lavallee	161,454	47.60%	+22.17%
Libertarian	Kurt Evans; Richard Shelatz	4,848	1.43%	N/A
Total votes		339,214	100.00%	N/A
Republican hold				

==== By county ====
County	Kristi Noem Larry Rhoden Republican		Billie Sutton Michelle Lavallee Democratic		Kurt Evans Richard Shelatz Libertarian		Margin		Total votes
County	%	#	%	#	%	#	%	#	Total votes
Aurora	50.31%	644	47.42%	607	2.27%	29	2.89%	37	1,280
Beadle	52.10%	3,182	46.37%	2,832	1.54%	94	5.73%	350	6,108
Bennett	50.18%	553	47.46%	523	2.36%	26	2.72%	30	1,102
Bon Homme	47.43%	1,303	51.26%	1,408	1.31%	36	–3.82%	–105	2,747
Brookings	44.35%	5,225	54.09%	6,372	1.55%	183	–9.74%	–1,147	11,780
Brown	47.48%	6,821	51.08%	7,338	1.43%	206	–3.60%	–517	14,365
Brule	51.78%	1,103	46.53%	991	1.69%	36	5.26%	112	2,130
Buffalo	25.18%	138	73.54%	403	1.28%	7	–48.36%	–265	548
Butte	65.78%	2,505	32.41%	1,234	1.81%	69	33.38%	1,271	3,808
Campbell	75.14%	550	23.63%	173	1.23%	9	51.50%	377	732
Charles Mix	46.76%	1,661	52.17%	1,853	1.07%	38	–5.41%	–192	3,552
Clark	52.82%	879	46.15%	768	1.02%	17	6.67%	111	1,664
Clay	33.42%	1,552	65.44%	3,039	1.14%	53	–32.02%	–1,487	4,644
Codington	54.85%	5,865	43.93%	4,697	1.23%	131	10.92%	1,168	10,693
Corson	38.38%	426	60.09%	667	1.53%	17	–21.71%	–241	1,110
Custer	63.26%	2,789	35.09%	1,547	1.66%	73	28.17%	1,242	4,409
Davison	51.95%	3,779	46.71%	3,398	1.33%	97	5.24%	381	7,274
Day	43.46%	1,207	55.13%	1,531	1.40%	39	–11.67%	–324	2,777
Deuel	52.94%	1,053	44.90%	893	2.16%	43	8.04%	160	1,989
Dewey	21.35%	393	77.68%	1,430	0.98%	18	–56.33%	–1,037	1,841
Douglas	74.87%	1,120	24.26%	363	0.87%	13	50.60%	757	1,496
Edmunds	59.60%	1,018	39.29%	671	1.11%	19	20.32%	347	1,708
Fall River	64.51%	2,059	33.36%	1,065	2.13%	68	31.14%	994	3,192
Faulk	62.70%	674	36.09%	388	1.21%	13	26.60%	286	1,075
Grant	55.28%	1,780	43.11%	1,388	1.61%	52	12.17%	392	3,220
Gregory	51.42%	1,107	47.79%	1,029	0.79%	17	3.62%	78	2,153
Haakon	77.67%	734	20.74%	196	1.59%	15	56.93%	538	945
Hamlin	64.95%	1,764	33.98%	923	1.07%	29	30.96%	841	2,716
Hand	57.16%	950	41.10%	683	1.74%	29	16.06%	267	1,662
Hanson	58.70%	945	40.19%	647	1.12%	18	18.51%	298	1,610
Harding	73.62%	505	25.36%	174	1.02%	7	48.25%	331	686
Hughes	46.82%	3,749	51.75%	4,144	1.42%	114	–4.93%	–395	8,007
Hutchinson	63.28%	2,082	35.87%	1,180	0.85%	28	27.42%	902	3,290
Hyde	61.67%	407	37.58%	248	0.76%	5	24.09%	159	660
Jackson	51.98%	513	46.00%	454	2.03%	20	5.98%	59	987
Jerauld	51.79%	478	46.91%	433	1.30%	12	4.88%	45	923
Jones	66.12%	361	31.68%	173	2.20%	12	34.43%	188	546
Kingsbury	53.08%	1,303	45.25%	1,111	1.67%	41	7.82%	192	2,455
Lake	47.69%	2,483	51.26%	2,669	1.06%	55	–3.57%	–186	5,207
Lawrence	54.91%	5,984	42.90%	4,675	2.19%	239	12.01%	1,309	10,898
Lincoln	53.27%	12,894	45.89%	11,109	0.84%	203	7.37%	1,785	24,206
Lyman	49.36%	691	48.71%	682	1.93%	27	0.64%	9	1,400
Marshall	43.15%	853	55.29%	1,093	1.57%	31	–12.14%	–240	1,977
McCook	55.07%	1,375	43.37%	1,083	1.56%	39	11.69%	292	2,497
McPherson	69.17%	729	29.32%	309	1.52%	16	39.85%	420	1,054
Meade	62.70%	6,413	34.80%	3,559	2.50%	256	27.90%	2,854	10,228
Mellette	42.05%	299	55.56%	395	2.39%	17	–13.50%	–96	711
Miner	47.33%	523	51.58%	570	1.09%	12	–4.25%	–47	1,105
Minnehaha	45.78%	32,355	52.98%	37,450	1.24%	876	–7.21%	–5,095	70,681
Moody	46.97%	1,340	51.49%	1,469	1.54%	44	–4.52%	–129	2,853
Oglala Lakota	7.05%	214	91.50%	2,778	1.45%	44	–84.45%	–2,564	3,036
Pennington	55.06%	22,944	43.17%	17,988	1.77%	738	11.89%	4,956	41,670
Perkins	70.91%	953	27.38%	368	1.71%	23	43.53%	585	1,344
Potter	67.91%	821	30.85%	373	1.24%	15	37.06%	448	1,209
Roberts	43.87%	1,643	55.06%	2,062	1.07%	40	–11.19%	–419	3,745
Sanborn	57.68%	593	40.76%	419	1.56%	16	16.93%	174	1,028
Spink	49.02%	1,376	49.66%	1,394	1.32%	37	–0.64%	–18	2,807
Stanley	51.24%	762	47.34%	704	1.41%	21	3.90%	58	1,487
Sully	61.58%	500	36.45%	296	1.97%	16	25.12%	204	812
Todd	17.40%	390	81.70%	1,831	0.89%	20	–64.30%	–1,441	2,241
Tripp	57.45%	1,430	41.10%	1,023	1.45%	36	16.35%	407	2,489
Turner	58.75%	2,272	40.24%	1,556	1.01%	39	18.52%	716	3,867
Union	60.85%	4,068	38.06%	2,544	1.09%	73	22.80%	1,524	6,685
Walworth	64.98%	1,468	33.29%	752	1.73%	39	31.70%	716	2,259
Yankton	45.73%	4,121	52.79%	4,757	1.49%	134	–7.06%	–636	9,012
Ziebach	29.32%	241	69.59%	572	1.09%	9	–40.27%	–331	822
Total	50.97%	172,912	47.60%	161,454	1.43%	4,848	3.38%	11,458	339,214

Counties that flipped from Republican to Democratic

- Bon Homme (largest city: Springfield)
- Brookings (largest city: Brookings)
- Brown (largest city: Aberdeen)
- Charles Mix (largest city: Lake Andes)
- Corson (largest city: McLaughlin)
- Day (largest city: Webster)
- Dewey (largest city: North Eagle Butte)
- Hughes (largest city: Pierre)
- Lake (largest city: Madison)
- Mellette (largest city: White River)
- Miner (largest city: Howard)
- Minnehaha (largest city: Sioux Falls)
- Moody (largest city: Flandreau)
- Roberts (largest city: Sisseton)
- Spink (largest city: Redfield)
- Yankton (largest city: Yankton)
- Ziebach (largest city: Dupree)
