= Kristi Noem =

American politician (born 1971)

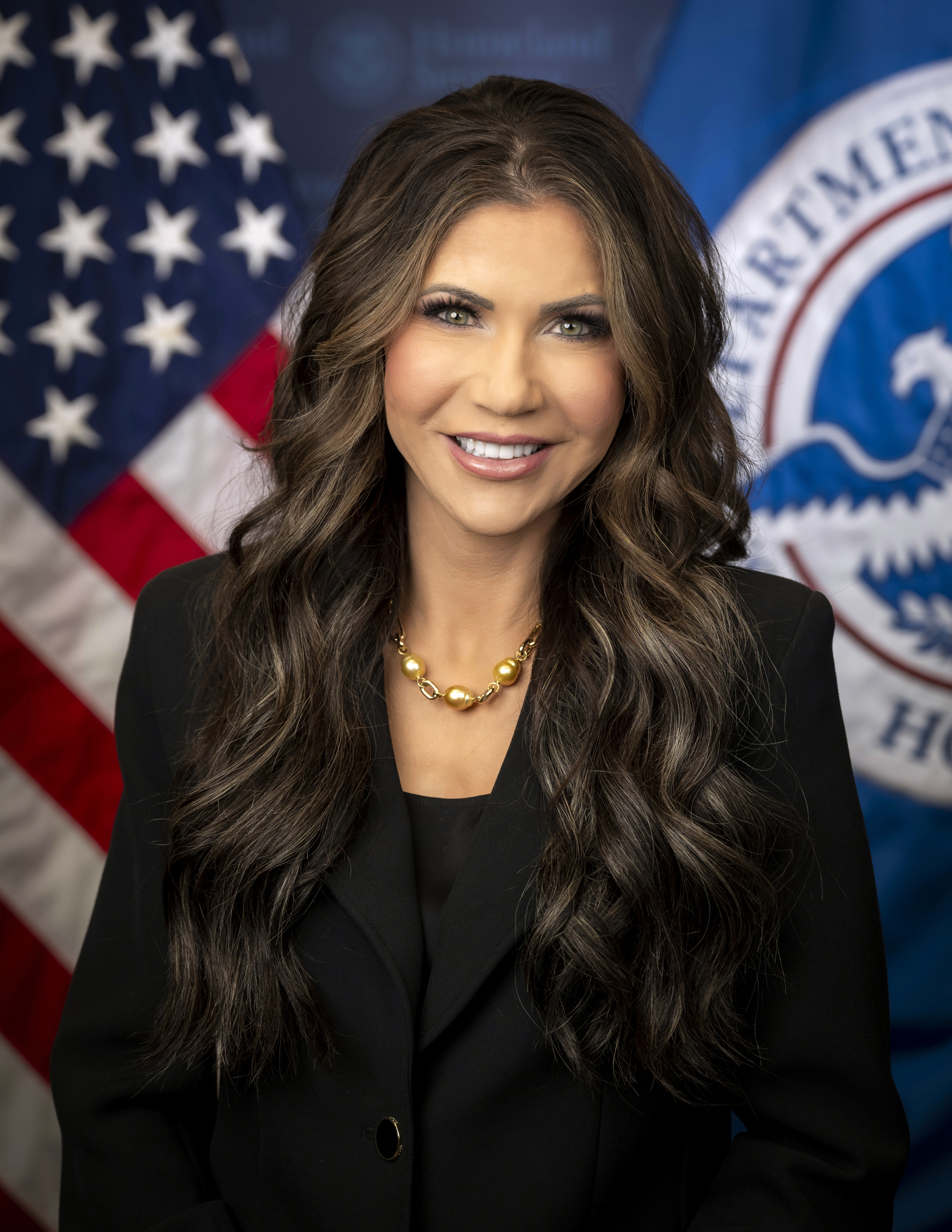
- Official portrait, 2025

Senior Advisor to the Deputy Secretary of State
- Incumbent
- Assumed office October 16, 2026
- President: Donald Trump
- Deputy Secretary: Christopher Landau
- Preceded by: Position established

United States Special Envoy for the Shield of the Americas
- In office March 24, 2026 – September 2026
- President: Donald Trump
- Preceded by: Position established
- Succeeded by: Vacant

8th United States Secretary of Homeland Security
- In office January 25, 2025 – March 24, 2026
- President: Donald Trump
- Deputy: Troy Edgar
- Preceded by: Alejandro Mayorkas
- Succeeded by: Markwayne Mullin

33rd Governor of South Dakota
- In office January 5, 2019 – January 25, 2025
- Lieutenant: Larry Rhoden
- Preceded by: Dennis Daugaard
- Succeeded by: Larry Rhoden

Member of the U.S. House of Representatives from South Dakota's at-large district
- In office January 3, 2011 – January 3, 2019
- Preceded by: Stephanie Herseth Sandlin
- Succeeded by: Dusty Johnson

Member of the South Dakota House of Representatives from the 6th district
- In office January 9, 2007 – January 3, 2011
- Preceded by: Art Fryslie
- Succeeded by: Burt Tulson

Personal details
- Born: Kristi Lynn Arnold; November 30, 1971 (age 54) Watertown, South Dakota, U.S.
- Party: Republican
- Spouse: Bryon Noem (m. 1992; sep. 2026)
- Children: 3
- Education: South Dakota State University (BA)
- Noem's voice Noem supporting the Tax Cuts and Jobs Act. Recorded December 19, 2017

Kristi Lynn Noem (/noʊm/ NOHM; née Arnold; born November 30, 1971) is an American politician and diplomat serving as a senior advisor to the deputy secretary of state. She served as the United States special envoy for the Shield of the Americas in 2026. From 2025 to 2026, she served as the eighth United States secretary of homeland security. A member of the Republican Party, she served from 2019 to 2025 as the 33rd governor of South Dakota and represented South Dakota's at-large congressional district in the U.S. House of Representatives from 2011 to 2019. During her tenure at the Department of Homeland Security (DHS), her immigration policies generated controversies, particularly following the actions of Immigration and Customs Enforcement (ICE).

Born in Watertown, South Dakota, Noem began her political career in the South Dakota House of Representatives, serving from 2007 to 2011. She was elected as the first female governor of South Dakota in 2018 with the endorsement of President Donald Trump. She gained national attention during the COVID-19 pandemic for opposing statewide mask mandates in favor of voluntary measures. Noem has conservative positions on most domestic issues, particularly gun rights, abortion, and immigration.

In January 2026, Noem defended the killings of Renée Good and Alex Pretti by federal ICE agents, before any investigation, which led some lawmakers to call for her resignation or impeachment. In March 2026, Noem appeared before the Senate Committee on the Judiciary after reports emerged of her alleged relationship with her subordinate, Corey Lewandowski, and of her misuse of government funds on television advertisements and private luxury jets, as well as inappropriate use of U.S. Coast Guard assets and housing. Her testimony before the committee intensified criticism from Congress. After the congressional hearing, Trump announced his decision to remove Noem from DHS. In March 2026, Noem was appointed special envoy for the Shield of the Americas, a US-led regional security organization.

== Early life and education ==
Noem was born Kristi Lynn Arnold to Corinne and Ron Arnold on November 30, 1971, in Watertown, South Dakota, and raised with her siblings on the family ranch and farm near the town of Hazel. She has Norwegian ancestry and is a descendant of Ephraim Wilson, who fought in the American Revolutionary War. Noem was crowned South Dakota Snow Queen on January 13, 1990, when she was a senior at Hamlin High School in Hayti.

Noem attended Northern State University from 1990 to 1994 but did not graduate. In March 1994, her father was killed in a grain bin accident and Noem left college early to run the family farm. Her daughter, Kassidy, was born weeks later, on April 21, 1994. She added a hunting lodge and restaurant to the family property. Her siblings also moved back to help expand the businesses.

Noem subsequently took classes at the Watertown campus of Mount Marty College and at South Dakota State University, and online classes from the University of South Dakota. She earned a Bachelor of Arts degree with a major in political science from South Dakota State University in 2012 while serving as a U.S. representative. The Washington Post dubbed her Capitol Hill's "most powerful intern" for receiving college intern credits from her position as a member of Congress.

== South Dakota House of Representatives (2007–2011) ==
In 2006, Noem won a seat as a Republican in the South Dakota House of Representatives, representing the 6th district, comprising parts of Beadle, Clark, Codington, Hamlin, and Kingsbury counties. In 2006, she won with 39% of the vote, and received $6330 in direct contributions to her campaign. In 2008, she was reelected with 41% of the vote.

Noem served for four years, from 2007 to 2010. She was an assistant majority leader during her second term. During her tenure, Noem was the prime sponsor of 11 bills that became law, including several property tax reforms and two bills to increase gun rights in South Dakota. In 2009, she served as vice chair of the Agriculture Land Assessment Advisory Task Force. Senator Larry Rhoden chaired the task force, and later served as her lieutenant governor. During her tenure, she joined the Civil Air Patrol as a "state legislative member".

== U.S. House of Representatives (2011–2019) ==
In 2010, Noem ran for South Dakota's at-large seat in the U.S. House of Representatives. She won the Republican primary and defeated incumbent Democrat Stephanie Herseth Sandlin in the general election. Noem was reelected three times, serving in Congress until 2019.

=== Tenure ===
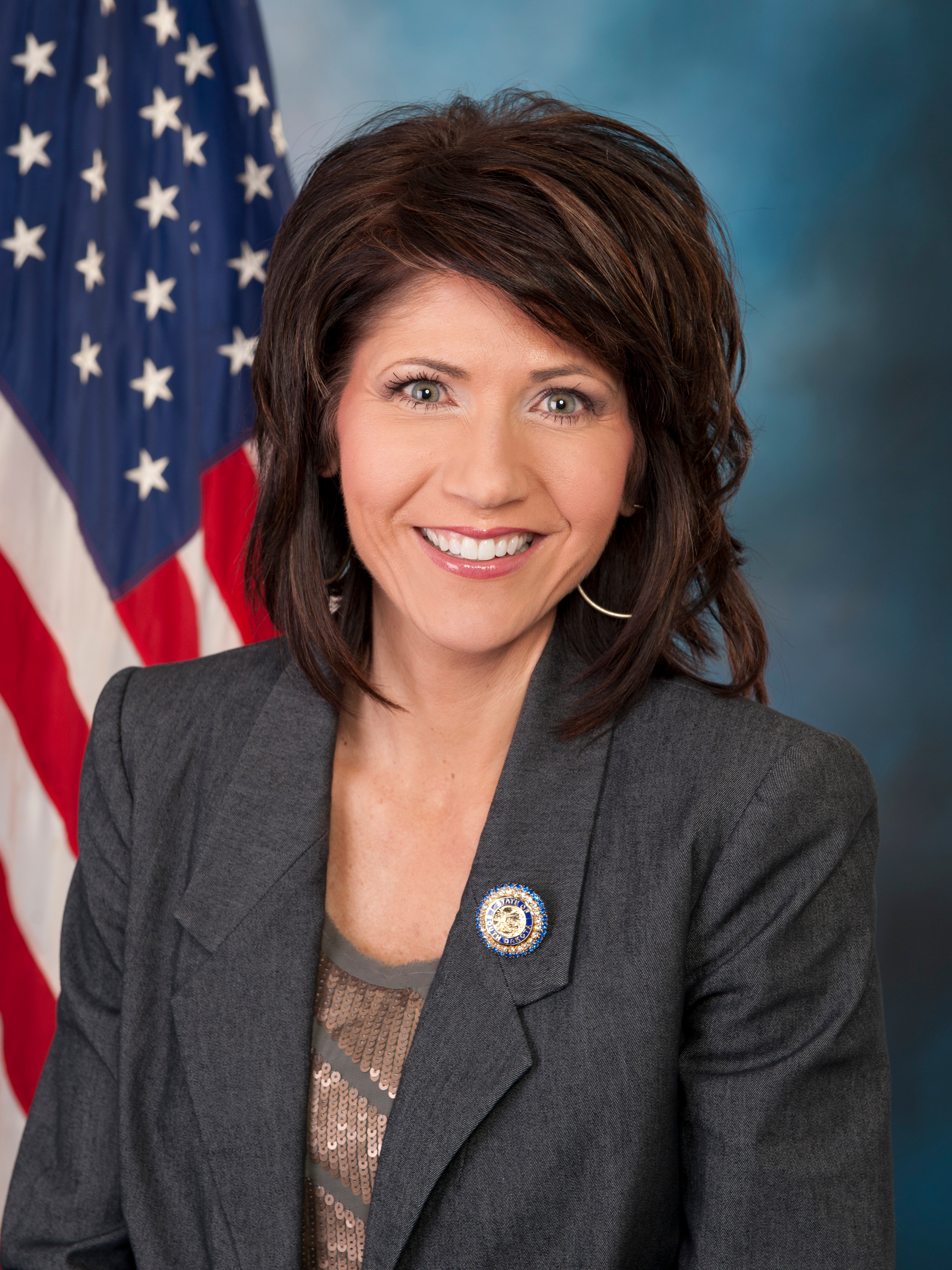
Official 112th United States Congress portrait, 2011

The 2011 House Republican 87-member freshman class elected Noem as liaison to the House Republican leadership, making her the second woman member of the House GOP leadership. According to The Hill, her role was to push the leadership to make significant cuts to federal government spending and to help Speaker John Boehner manage the expectations of the freshman class. In March 2011, Republican Representative Pete Sessions of Texas named Noem one of the 12 regional directors for the National Republican Congressional Committee during the 2012 election campaign.

On March 8, 2011, she announced the formation of a leadership political action committee, KRISTI PAC. Former South Dakota Lieutenant Governor Steve Kirby is its treasurer. Noem was among the top freshman Republicans in PAC fundraising in the first quarter of 2011, raising $169,000 from PACs.

==== Abortion and stem cells ====
In August 2010, while running for Congress, Noem indicated on a questionnaire from the Christian Coalition of America that she would vote to ban in-vitro fertilization and embryonic stem-cell research.

Noem co-sponsored legislation that would federally ban abortion. In 2015, she co-sponsored a bill to amend the 14th Amendment to define human life and personhood as beginning at fertilization, federally banning abortion from the moment of fertilization, without exceptions. She also voted for a bill to ban abortion after 20 weeks of pregnancy.

==== Energy and environment ====
Noem has expressed skepticism about the scientific consensus on climate change. In 2022 she said she believes "the science has been varied on it, and it hasn't been proven to me that what we're doing is affecting the climate."

Noem has said that the U.S. needs an "all-of-the-above energy approach" that includes renewables like wind and ethanol while still realizing the need for a "balanced energy mix" that ends American dependence on foreign oil.

Noem supported the Keystone XL Pipeline and supports offshore oil drilling. She co-sponsored three bills that she argued would reduce American dependence on foreign oil by ending the 2010 United States deepwater drilling moratorium in the Gulf of Mexico and reopening sales on oil leases in the Gulf and off the coast of Virginia. In 2011, she sponsored a measure to block Environmental Protection Agency funding for tighter air pollution standards for coarse particulates.

Noem opposed a bill introduced by South Dakota Senator Tim Johnson that would designate over 48,000 acres (190 km^{2}) of the Buffalo Gap National Grassland as protected wilderness. She supports the designation of the land as a national grassland. She said the land is already managed as roadless areas similar to wilderness and argued that changing the land's designation to wilderness would further limit leaseholder access to the land and imperil grazing rights.

==== Foreign affairs ====
From 2013 to 2015, Noem served on the House Armed Services Committee, where she worked on the 2014 National Defense Authorization Act. Her appointment to the committee was seen as a benefit to South Dakota's Ellsworth Air Force Base. In March 2011, Noem was critical of President Barack Obama's approach to the NATO-led military intervention in the 2011 Libyan civil war, calling on him to provide more information about the U.S.'s role in the conflict, and characterizing his statements as vague and ambiguous.

==== Health care ====
Noem opposes the Affordable Care Act (Obamacare) and has voted to repeal it. Having unsuccessfully sought to repeal it, she sought to defund it while retaining measures such as the Indian Health Care Improvement Act, the provision allowing parents to keep their children on their health insurance plan into their 20s, and the high-risk pools. Noem wanted to add such provisions to federal law as limits on medical malpractice lawsuits and allowing patients to buy health insurance plans from other states. She supported cuts to Medicaid funding proposed by Republican Budget Committee chairman Paul Ryan. A study found that this action would reduce benefits for South Dakota Medicaid recipients by 55 percent.

==== Immigrants and refugees ====
Noem supported President Donald Trump's 2017 Executive Order 13769, which suspended the U.S. refugee program for 120 days and banned all travel to the U.S. by nationals of seven Muslim-majority countries for 90 days. She said she supported a temporary ban on accepting refugees from "terrorist-held" areas, but "did not address whether she supports other aspects of the order, which led to the detention of legal U.S. residents such as green-card holders, and people with dual citizenship as they reentered the country" in the aftermath of the order's issuance.

In 2019, Noem consented to South Dakota's participation in the U.S. Refugee Resettlement Program following a Trump executive order that allowed state and local governments to opt out.

==== Taxes ====
In 2017, Noem was on the conference committee that negotiated the passage of the Tax Cuts and Jobs Act, which she touted as giving the average South Dakota family a $1,200 tax cut.

In 2018, Noem was reported to have "pitched the idea to members of the conservative House Freedom Caucus" to attach her online sales tax bill to the government funding package as part of an omnibus. A court case under consideration in the South Dakota Supreme Court involved requiring "certain out-of-state retailers to collect its sales taxes." Noem said that South Dakota businesses (and by extension businesses nationwide) "could be forced to comply with 1,000 different tax structures nationwide without the tools necessary to do so", adding that her legislation "provides a necessary fix."

Noem has called the budget deficit one of the most important issues facing Congress. She cosponsored H. J. Res. 2, which would require that total spending for any fiscal year not exceed total receipts. She cited the Environmental Protection Agency, the Department of Veterans Affairs, Medicaid, high-speed rail projects, cap-and-trade technical assistance, and subsidies for the Washington Metro rapid transit system as examples of federal programs where she would like to see cuts.

In 2011, Noem indicated that she would vote to raise the federal debt ceiling, but only if "tied to budget reforms that change the way we spend our dollars and how Washington, D.C., does business. It won't just be a one-time spending cut." She ultimately voted for S. 365, The Budget Control Act of 2011, which allowed Obama to raise the debt ceiling in exchange for spending cuts to be decided by a bipartisan committee. She also said she wanted to eliminate the estate tax, lower the corporate tax rate, and simplify the tax code. She said she would not raise taxes to balance the budget.

Committee assignments

- Committee on Ways and Means
  - Subcommittee on Human Resources
  - Subcommittee on Select Revenue Measures

Caucus memberships

- Republican Study Committee
- Congressional Arts Caucus
- Afterschool Caucuses
- Congressional Western Caucus

== Governor of South Dakota (2019–2025) ==
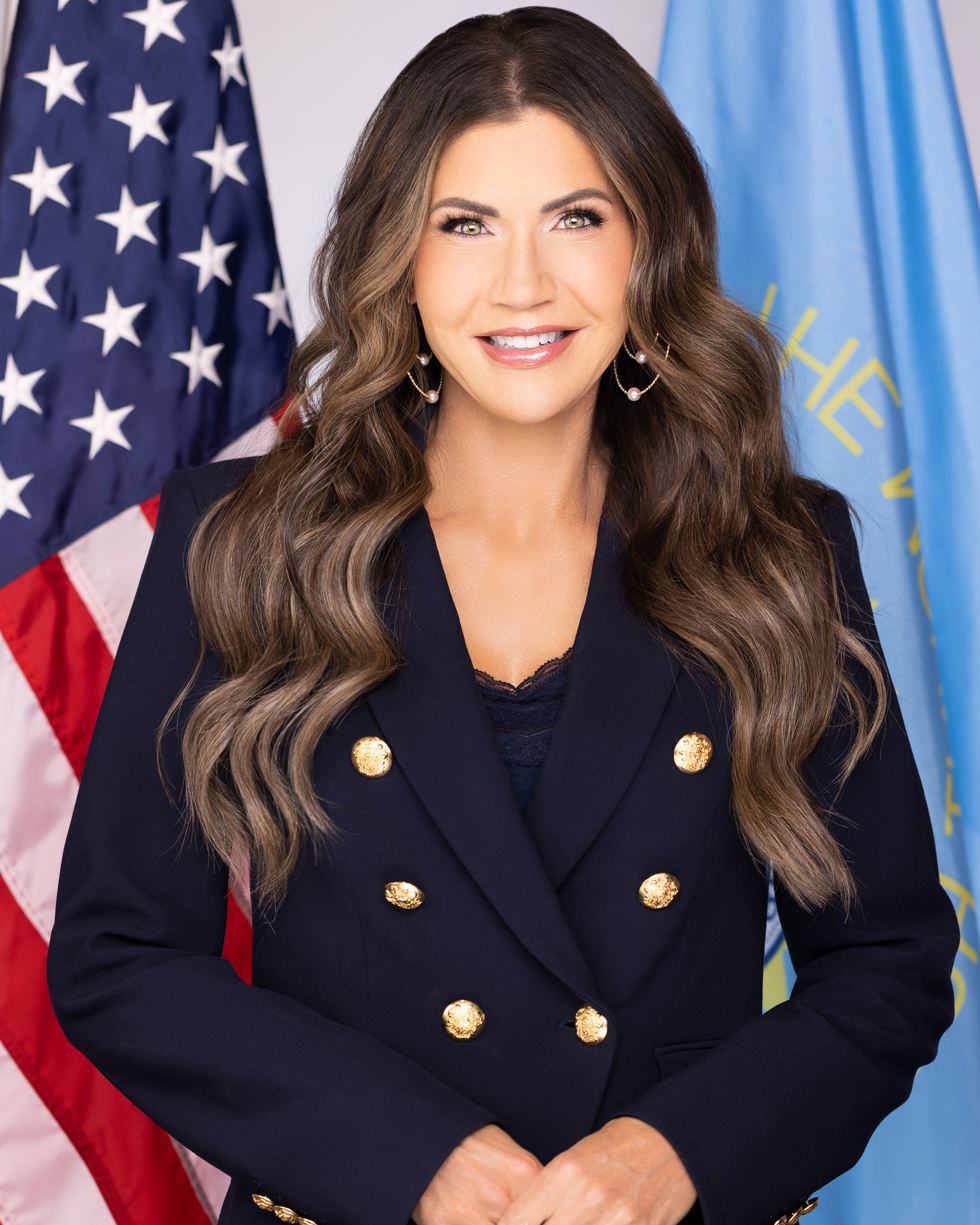
Official gubernatorial portrait, 2023

=== Elections ===
==== 2018 ====
In November 2016, Noem announced she would run for governor of South Dakota in 2018 rather than seek reelection to Congress. She defeated South Dakota Attorney General Marty Jackley in the June Republican primary, 56 to 44 percent, and Democratic nominee Billie Sutton in the general election, 51 to 48 percent.

==== 2022 ====
In November 2021, Noem announced she was running for reelection as governor. State Representative Steven Haugaard, a Republican, announced he was running against Noem. In February 2022, House Democratic Minority Leader Jamie Smith announced he was seeking the Democratic nomination.

In the Republican primary in June, Noem defeated Haugaard, 76% to 24%. In the general election, she defeated Smith, 62% to 35%. Despite predictions of a competitive race, Noem flipped 17 counties that had previously voted Democratic and set a record for the most votes received by a candidate for governor in South Dakota.

=== Tenure ===
Noem was sworn in as South Dakota governor on January 5, 2019. She is the first woman to hold that office.

==== Abortion ====
Noem is anti-abortion. She has been lauded by the anti-abortion group Susan B. Anthony List and said she intends to maintain her 100% anti-abortion voting record.

In 2019, Noem signed bills restricting abortion, saying they would "crack down on abortion providers in South Dakota" and that a "strong and growing body of medical research provides evidence that unborn babies can feel, think, and recognize sounds in the womb. These are people, they must be given the same basic dignities as anyone else."

Following the overturning of Roe v. Wade, South Dakota became one of the first states to enact trigger laws banning abortions. Noem defended South Dakota's abortion ban, which only allows exceptions in cases in which the mother's life is in danger. When asked about the case of the 10-year-old child abuse victim who traveled from Ohio to Indiana to receive an abortion, Noem said she would not support changing the law to allow exceptions for rape victims, explaining that she did not "believe a tragic situation should be perpetuated by another tragedy".

Noem proclaimed 2024 the "Freedom for Life Year", promoting anti-abortion laws. In April 2024, she announced that she had reversed her support for a federal ban on abortion, saying she believed abortion law should be determined at the state level, and continued to support South Dakota's law banning abortion except to save the life of the pregnant patient, without exceptions for rape or incest.

==== Early childhood education ====
Noem is a vocal opponent of subsidized child care. Her administration rejected $7.5 million in federal funding for free summer meal programs for low-income residents and defeated multiple attempts to provide school lunches for eligible students. In 2023, Noem said, "I just don't think it's the government's job to pay or to raise people's children for them".

==== Access to public records ====
While running for governor in 2018, Noem made government transparency part of her platform. In her first State of the State address she pledged to "work toward building the most transparent administration South Dakota has ever seen".

Throughout her tenure, news outlets and government transparency advocates sued Noem for failing to provide the transparency she had advocated for. Complaints included denial of immediate access to a state-funded report about the alleged presence of critical race theory and "divisive concepts" in South Dakota schools; denial of access to pardon records; not releasing the cost of the governor's security team; whipping votes against a bill to make public records of the cost of the governor's security; and attempts to seal records on an ethics investigation involving her daughter.

==== Anti-protest legislation ====
In response to protests against the Keystone Pipeline, Noem's office collaborated with the energy company TransCanada Corporation to develop anti-protest legislation, which Noem signed into law in 2019. The law created a fund to cover the costs of policing pipeline protests. Another law was passed to raise revenue for the fund by creating civil penalties for advising, directing, or encouraging participation in rioting. The Pine Ridge Indian Reservation banned Noem from their grounds as a result. The Indigenous Environmental Network, Sierra Club, and other groups challenged the laws in suits, arguing that they violated First Amendment rights by incentivizing the state to sue protesters. In 2020, after a federal court struck down sections of the legislation as unconstitutional, Noem brought legislation to repeal sections of the previous bill and clarify the definition of "incitement to riot".

==== China ====
Noem has called China "an enemy" of the U.S. In 2022, she issued an order banning TikTok from state-owned devices, saying the "Chinese Communist Party uses information it gathers on TikTok to manipulate the American people". In 2023, she signed an order prohibiting the downloading or use of any application or visiting of any site owned by the Chinese company Tencent, including WeChat, on state-owned devices. In 2024, she signed a bill prohibiting the governments of six countries—China, Cuba, Iran, North Korea, Russia, and Venezuela—and entities from those countries from buying agricultural land in South Dakota.

==== Conflict of interest action to professionally benefit daughter ====
In 2020, after Noem's 26-year-old daughter, Kassidy Peters, was denied a real estate appraisal license, Noem summoned to her office Sherry Bren, a state employee who had directed South Dakota's Appraiser Certification Program for 30 years. Attendees included Peters, Noem's chief of staff Tony Venhuizen, Department of Labor Attorney Amber Mulder and Labor Secretary Marcia Hultman.

By telephone, the group was joined by the governor's general counsel, Tom Hart, and a lawyer from the state's Department of Labor and Regulation, Graham Oey. A week later, Hultman demanded Bren's resignation. Bren repeatedly tried to resolve the issues short of resigning, but unsuccessfully, eventually filing an age discrimination complaint. She received a $200,000 settlement as part of a nondisclosure agreement to withdraw her complaint and leave her position. Noem's spokesperson characterized the allegations as an example of how Noem cut through "bureaucratic red tape".

After the Associated Press published a story about the incident, the State Senate's Government Operations and Audit Committee was delegated to investigate. In October 2021, the Committee invited Hultman and Bren to come before it to discuss the appraisal program in light of the controversy. On December 14, 2021, Bren testified before the Government Operations and Audit Committee. She said that Peters received an Agreed Disposition around March/April 2020. Around July 20, 2020, Peters received a letter and/or Findings of Fact and Conclusions of Law when she failed to meet the requirements of the Agreed Disposition. Bren said that on July 26, Department of Labor attorney Amber Mulder told her to be prepared to discuss "what is the definition of a serious deficiency; what criteria do you use for denials; how many are denied each year; how many are approved; are we saying that Kassidy can take certain classes and resubmit".

Bren said she felt "very nervous" and "intimidated" when meeting with Noem and attorneys and Labor Secretary Hultman. Bren mentioned during the meeting at the mansion some appraisal classes that she thought would be helpful to Peters. Bren said that Noem was upset that she was just now hearing about the classes. Bren testified that the decision to depart from recognized upgrade procedures and offer a third opportunity would be Hultman's. Bren said this was beyond the recognized procedures and "not normal."

On November 1, 2021, the Government Accountability Board set an agenda to discuss this issue and another issue based on complaints brought by Ravnsborg. On December 15, 2021, the Government Accountability Board referred one of the two complaints to Noem for a response and sent the other back to the complainant for further information. On February 3, 2022, the Government Accountability Board referred the second complaint to Noem for a response and gave her until April 15, 2022, to answer both pending complaints.

On February 24, 2022, Republican State Representative John Mills introduced House Resolution 7004, "Addressing the Governor's unacceptable actions in matters related to the appraiser certification program", against Noem. On March 1, the resolution was debated and failed by a margin of 29 to 38 with three excused, including Noem's primary opponent Steven Haugaard and U.S. House candidate Taffy Howard.

==== Conflict with Native American tribes ====
In 2024, it was reported that all nine tribes of South Dakota banned Noem from entering any tribal lands, prohibiting her from entering almost 20% of South Dakota. Other media reported that one of the nine tribes, the Yankton Sioux, had not officially banned Noem. The Oglala Sioux banned Noem in February, followed by the Cheyenne River Sioux, the Standing Rock Sioux, and the Rosebud Sioux in April, and the Sisseton Wahpeton Oyate, the Crow Creek Sioux, and the Flandreau Santee Sioux in May.

The tribes took action after demanding that Noem apologize for her comments about them. In January 2024, Noem said that an "invasion is coming over the southern border" of the United States, and the "enemy is the Mexican drug cartels", which are "perpetrating violence in each of our states, even here in South Dakota ... The cartels are using our reservations to facilitate the spread of drugs throughout the Midwest." In March 2024, Noem said there were "some tribal leaders that I believe are personally benefiting from the cartels being there", but gave no evidence, and that there were people "who actually live in those situations, who call me and text me every day and say, 'Please, dear governor, please come help us in Pine Ridge. We are scared.'" She added: "they live with 80% to 90% unemployment. Their kids don't have any hope. They don't have parents who show up and help them."

Around January 2025, Noem apologized to the tribes for the misunderstanding between them, and the Flandreau Santee Sioux tribe dissolved its order banning Noem from its land. The tribal leaders said Noem had committed to protecting the people of South Dakota, including the citizens of the nine Tribal Nations, and expressed support for her nomination as Secretary of Homeland Security. In January 2026, amid reports of ICE agents targeting Indigenous people in Minnesota, tribal leaders from the Dakotas expressed their displeasure and concern with Noem and ICE policies that caused fear among tribal citizens.

==== COVID-19 pandemic ====
During the COVID-19 pandemic in South Dakota, Noem initially supported some containment measures before adopting a largely hands‑off approach. In November 2020, she used pandemic relief funds to promote tourism during a surge in cases. She was one of few governors who did not maintain statewide stay-at-home orders or mask mandates; her response broadly mirrored Donald Trump's approach, and she was given a speaking slot at the 2020 Republican National Convention, which raised her national profile.

Early in the pandemic, Noem asked the legislature to give the state health secretary and county officials authority to close businesses; the House rejected the bill. On March 13, 2020, she ordered K‑12 schools to close, and on April 6 she extended that order for the rest of the school year; she also directed businesses and local governments to follow CDC social‑distancing guidance.

Noem emphasized South Dakota's role in evaluating hydroxychloroquine, which was later found to be ineffective against COVID-19 and to cause fatal cardiac arrhythmia.

In early 2020, one of the largest COVID outbreaks in the US occurred in South Dakota. The Smithfield Foods plant in Sioux Falls reported four deaths and nearly 1,300 infections among workers and family members. Secretary of Health and Human Services Alex Azar told legislators that infections were likely due to workers' "home and social" habits; on April 13, Noem said, "We believe that 99 percent of what's going on today wasn't happening inside" the plant. The Food Safety and Inspection Service initially did not give inspectors PPE and discouraged masks. It later permitted and then supplied them. Noem said the plant was operating as an essential facility; 48 workers were hospitalized.

Noem did not mandate social distancing or mask‑wearing at the July 3, 2020, event at Mount Rushmore with Trump present. She publicly doubted mask effectiveness, citing the Association of American Physicians and Surgeons in a Rapid City Journal opinion piece.

COVID cases rose sharply after the 2020 Sturgis Motorcycle Rally, in which Noem participated; hospitalizations reached a then‑record 355 on October 22 (75 in ICUs). Health systems postponed elective procedures and urged masking; Sioux Falls Mayor Paul TenHaken told residents, "Wear a dang mask."

Sixteen weeks after Trump's 2020 executive order providing a $300 weekly unemployment supplement, Noem declined the money, citing low unemployment; South Dakota was the only state to do so. The jobless rate in June was 7.2%, up from 3.1% in March and down from 11% in April.

From 2020 to 2021, the following events took place:

- Noem supported the annual Sturgis Motorcycle Rally in August 2020; nearly 500,000 bikers attended.
- In September 2020, amid a surge of new cases, Noem announced $5 million of relief funding for a state tourism campaign, including $819,000 for a 30‑second Fox News commercial narrated during the RNC.
- Also in September 2020, over 550 students were infected at South Dakota universities; 200 more cases were reported in K–12 schools.
- In October 2020, as South Dakota recorded one of the highest per‑capita case rates and hospitals prioritized severe cases, Noem attributed higher case numbers to increased testing, despite rising positivity and hospitalizations.
- In February 2021, Noem signed a bill limiting civil liability for certain COVID-19 exposures, exempting businesses (including PPE sellers) unless exposure resulted from gross negligence, recklessness, or willful misconduct.
- Also in February 2021, she opposed a bill prohibiting schools and universities from requiring student vaccinations; in May she signed an order barring government facilities from requiring proof of vaccination for services, calling such requirements "un‑American".
- In August 2021, Noem opposed legislation proposed by Republican legislators Jon Hansen and Scott Odenbach to prohibit businesses from requiring vaccinations as a condition of employment.
- In July 2021, she criticized other Republican governors for enacting mandatory measures and "rewriting history", arguing that South Dakota had addressed the pandemic by testing and isolating cases; at the time, the state had a high per‑capita death and case rate.

==== Department of Corrections ====
In July 2021, Noem placed Secretary of the Department of Corrections Mike Liedholt on administrative leave, and fired South Dakota State Penitentiary Warden Darin Young and Deputy Warden Jennifer Dreiske, after receiving an anonymous note with complaints regarding pay, medical coverage and instances of sexual harassment. Liedholt later announced his retirement. Later that month, after meeting with prison employees, despite lingering COVID-19 cases, Noem ended the prison's mask mandate.

In August 2021, Noem announced that the CGL Group, a California-based company, was hired for $166,410 to conduct a comprehensive review of the Department of Corrections' operations. At the same time, the director of the prison work program was fired, and two other DOC employees relieved of their duties.

The prison work program director, Stephany Bawek, subsequently filed a complaint with the U.S. Equal Employment Opportunity Commission (EEOC), alleging that she was retaliated against for reporting sexual harassment by Young. On March 14, 2022, Bawek filed a lawsuit in federal district court alleging that she was fired for reporting incidents of sexual harassment in the workplace.

==== Deployment of South Dakota National Guard to southern border (2021) ====
In June 2021, Noem announced that she was sending members of the South Dakota National Guard to Texas's border with Mexico. Tennessee billionaire Willis Johnson said he would donate the money necessary for the deployment. On September 22, 2021, the Center for Public Integrity sued the South Dakota National Guard and the U.S. Department of Defense in the federal district court in the District of Columbia to obtain documents about the deployment and the donation. The 2022 National Defense Authorization Act banned National Guard members from crossing state borders to perform duties paid for by private donors.

==== Fireworks at Mount Rushmore lawsuit (2021) ====
In 2021, Noem sued U.S. secretary of the interior Deb Haaland, seeking to have fireworks at Mount Rushmore for Independence Day. Fireworks displays had been halted at the site in 2009 by the National Park Service due to fire risks and other reasons. Noem hired the private Washington D.C. law firm Consovoy McCarthy to bring the case, with South Dakota state taxpayer money paying for the suit. The U.S. District Court dismissed the suit, with Judge Roberto Lange finding that four of the five reasons given by the NPS and Secretary Haaland were valid. On July 13, Noem filed an appeal with the 8th Circuit Court of Appeals.

On March 14, 2022, the National Park Service again denied Noem's application for a permit to have fireworks at Mount Rushmore for the 4th of July, citing opposition from Native American groups and the possibility of wildfires.

==== Governor's mansion spending ====
In May 2019, Noem proposed to build a fence around the governor's mansion, estimated to cost approximately $400,000, but retracted the proposal. In 2020, the 2019 project was revived; a senior Noem advisor told the media that the decision was based on the recommendations of Noem's security team. In late November 2021, it was reported that Noem spent $68,000 of taxpayer dollars on imported rugs from India, chandeliers and a sauna for the mansion.

==== Guns ====
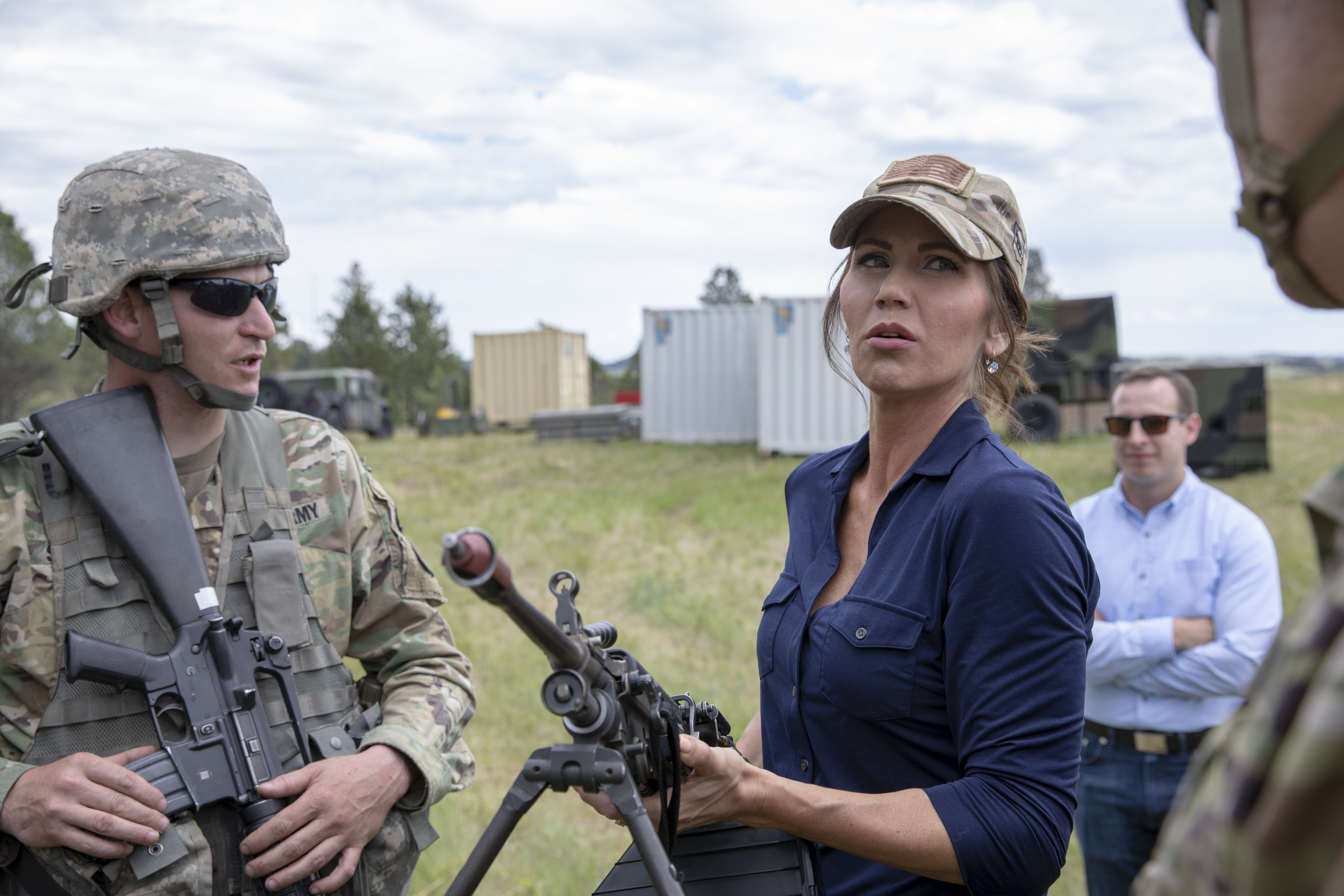
Noem visiting U.S. troops during the 2019 Golden Coyote Exercise at Rapid City, S.D., June 2019

In 2019, Noem signed a bill into law abolishing South Dakota's permit requirement to carry a concealed handgun. In 2022, she sought to build a gun range in Meade County with government funds, but the legislature rejected it.

At a 2023 NRA forum in Indiana, Noem said that her two-year-old granddaughter had a shotgun, a rifle, and a "little pony named Sparkles".

==== LGBTQ rights ====
Noem opposes same-sex marriage. In 2015, she said she disagreed with Obergefell v. Hodges, the Supreme Court's ruling that same-sex marriage bans are unconstitutional.

On March 8, 2021, Noem announced on Twitter that she would sign into law H.B. 1217, the Women's Fairness in Sports Bill, which bans transgender athletes from playing on or against women's school and college sports teams. Some critics of the bill said they were worried it might turn away business and cost the state money. On March 19, Noem issued a style and form veto to H.B. 1217 that substantially altered the bill, not just correcting grammar and spelling mistakes. She defended her position on Tucker Carlson Tonight.

On March 29, the South Dakota House rejected Noem's veto, 67–2. The bill was returned to Noem for reconsideration, and she vetoed it again. The House failed to override her veto, by a vote of 45–24. 47 votes were needed to override. Many conservative commentators criticized Noem for vetoing the bill.

In December 2021, Noem and her office signaled their support for a bill called "An Act to Protect Fairness in Women's Sports." The bill would require young athletes to join teams that align with their sex assigned at birth.

In 2021, Noem signed a religious refusal bill into law. The legislation amended the state RFRA to allow business owners to cite religious beliefs as a basis to deny products or services to people based on sexual orientation or gender identity. The legislation, S.B. 124, was criticized by civil rights groups who said it would enable discrimination against LGBTQ+ people, women, and members of minority faiths. This bill was the first major state RFRA law signed into law in six years, and resembles the 2015 bill signed into law by Indiana Governor Mike Pence.

==== "Meth. We're on It" campaign ====
On November 18, 2019, Noem released a meth awareness campaign named "Meth. We're on It". The campaign was widely mocked and Noem was criticized for spending $449,000 of public funds while hiring an out-of-state advertising agency from Minnesota to lead the project. She defended the campaign as successful in raising awareness.

==== Opposition to cannabis legalization ====
In 2020, Noem opposed two ballot measures to legalize cannabis for medical use and recreational use in South Dakota, saying, "The fact is, I've never met someone who got smarter from smoking pot. It's not good for our kids. And it's not going to improve our communities." After both measures passed, she and two police officers filed a lawsuit seeking a court decision against the measure legalizing recreational use, Amendment A.

On February 8, 2021, circuit court judge Christina Klinger struck down the amendment as unconstitutional. After the ruling, she also sought to delay the implementation of the medical marijuana initiative for a year. Ultimately, her efforts failed and medical marijuana became legal on July 1, 2021.

Noem has opposed the cultivation of industrial hemp, vetoing a bill that passed the South Dakota House and Senate in 2019 to legalize hemp cultivation. She said, "There is no question in my mind that normalizing hemp, like legalizing medical marijuana, is part of a larger strategy to undermine enforcement of the drug laws and make legalized marijuana inevitable."

==== Release of prisoners without review by the state Board of Pardons and Paroles ====
Noem ordered release of 19 convicted criminals without the customary review by the state Board of Pardons and Paroles. As of May 2026, 12 of them had been charged with new crimes.

==== RV park in Custer State Park proposal ====
In 2022, Noem sought to locate a government-paid RV park in Custer State Park. The proposal was met with significant opposition to include government competing with private business and disturbing the pristine nature of the park. The House Agricultural and Natural Resources deferred the bill to the 41st day, effectively killing it, by a vote of 9–3.

==== School prayer bill ====
In 2022, Noem sought to have prayer put back in school after mentioning it in a speech in Iowa. On January 21, 2022, the "prayer bill", HB 1015, was defeated in the House Education Committee by a vote of 9–6. An aide to Noem admitted to the committee that no schools were consulted about the proposal.

==== Staff ====
On November 19, 2021, Noem named her fifth chief of staff, Mark Miller, to replace outgoing chief of staff Aaron Scheibe. Scheibe served as chief of staff from May 1 to November 19, 2021. Tony Venhuizen preceded Scheibe from March 2, 2020, to April 23, 2021. Josh Shields preceded Venhuizen from October 1, 2019, to January 1, 2020. Herb Jones was Noem's first chief of staff, and served from January 5 to October 1, 2019.

==== Trade ====
In February 2019, she said that the Trump administration's trade wars with China and the European Union had devastated South Dakota's economy, particularly the agricultural sector, "by far" the state's largest industry.

==== Supplemental income from political donations ====
In 2023, while serving as South Dakota's governor, Noem funneled $80,000 in fees from a nonprofit, American Resolve Policy Fund, into her personal company. She failed to disclose this payment in her federal ethics filings upon joining DHS, which ethics experts say violates disclosure rules.

== Secretary of Homeland Security (2025–2026) ==
=== Nomination and confirmation ===
Noem's Senate confirmation hearing to become Secretary of Homeland Security on January 17, 2025

On November 12, 2024, President-elect Trump selected Noem to serve as Secretary of Homeland Security in his second term. The Senate Committee on Homeland Security and Governmental Affairs held a confirmation hearing for her on January 17, 2025. The committee advanced her nomination in a 13–2 vote on January 20. On January 25, the Senate confirmed Noem by a vote of 59–34, with seven Democrats voting to confirm.

=== Tenure ===
After resigning as governor of South Dakota, Noem was sworn in on January 25, 2025, by Supreme Court Justice Clarence Thomas as Secretary of Homeland Security, with Louisiana Governor Jeff Landry holding the Bible.

In the early morning of January 28, Noem joined multiple federal law enforcement agencies, including United States Immigration and Customs Enforcement (ICE), to lead a raid on undocumented immigrants in New York City. Her department posted a video of the raid on X that showed an apparent arrest.

After the 2025 Potomac River mid-air collision, Noem deployed U.S. Coast Guard resources for search and rescue efforts.

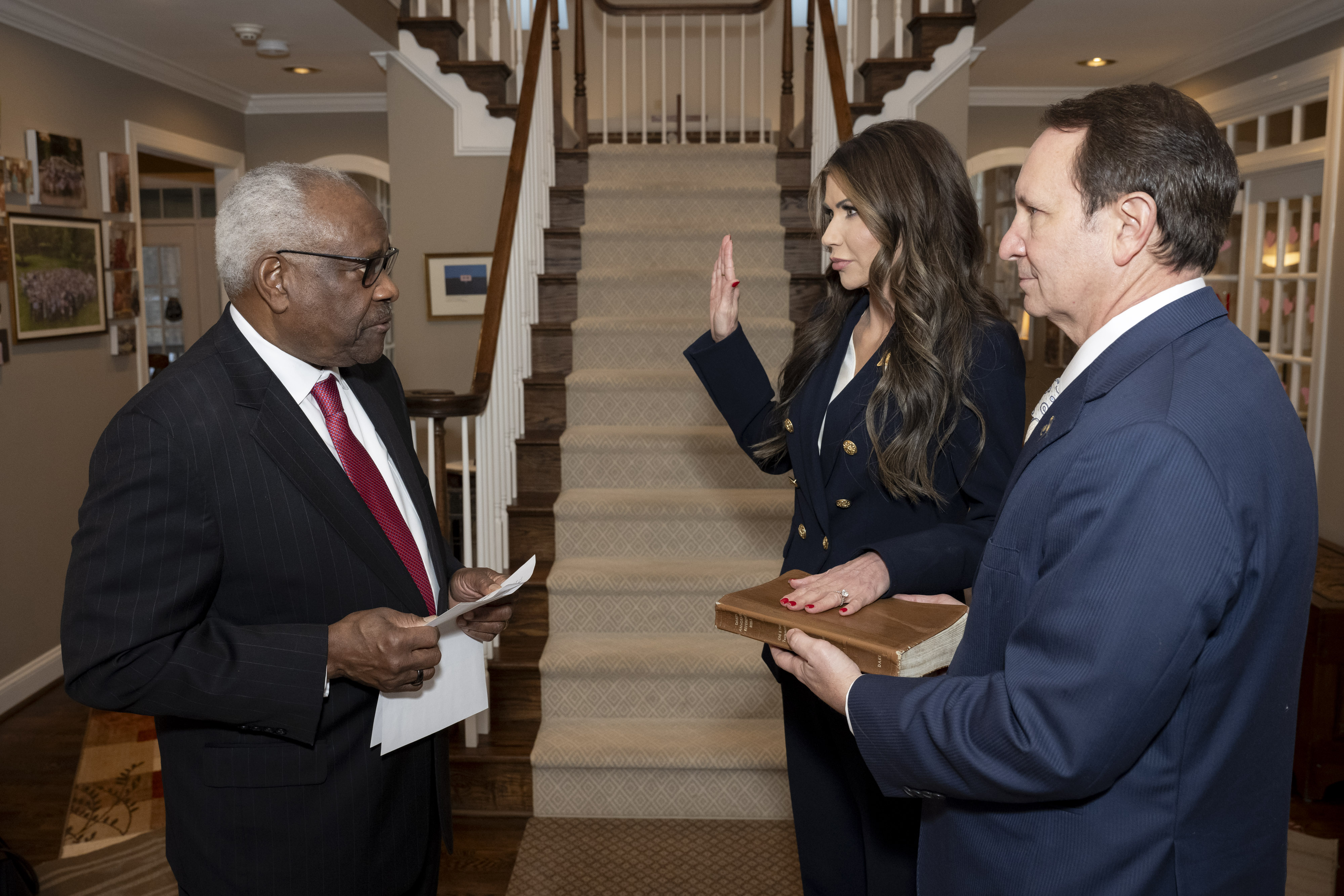
Noem being sworn in by Associate Justice Clarence Thomas on January 25, 2025

One of Noem's first acts in office was to rescind an 18-month extension of temporary protected status for about 600,000 Venezuelans who had fled Nicolás Maduro's authoritarian regime. In March, she revoked legal protections for 532,000 people from Cuba, Haiti, Nicaragua, and Venezuela who had settled in the U.S. since 2022.

In February, CNN host Dana Bash interviewed Noem about the new administration's policies and the Department of Homeland Security, including the use of Guantanamo Bay to detain migrants, which Noem said would be temporary. Noem also told Bash that she was comfortable with the Department of Government Efficiency (DOGE) having access to sensitive data, saying that it was identifying waste, fraud, and abuse. She added, "information he [Elon Musk] has is looking at programs, not focusing on personal data and information."

In April, The Washington Post reported that Noem and acting Social Security Administration commissioner Leland Dudek had instructed the Social Security Administration to falsely list over 6,000 living immigrants in its database of dead people.

On April 20, 2025, Noem's purse was stolen at a D.C. burger restaurant. It contained her government access badge, apartment keys, $2,000–3,000 in cash, her passport, and blank checks. The incident raised various concerns, including about her Secret Service detail presence.

The Trump administration has claimed that around 140,000 people had been deported as of April 2025, though some estimates put the number at roughly half that.

During a May 20 Senate Homeland Security and Governmental Affairs Committee hearing on the Department of Homeland Security's budget for fiscal year 2026, Noem incorrectly defined habeas corpus as "a constitutional right that the president has to be able to remove people from this country" in response to a question from Senator Maggie Hassan. Habeas corpus is the constitutional right for a detainee to request that a court review the lawfulness of their detention, which would require the government to justify the detention. After being corrected on the definition, Noem said that the American president "has the authority under the Constitution to" choose to suspend habeas corpus. The constitutional clause on the suspension of habeas corpus, which reads "Rebellion or Invasion the public Safety may require it", is in Article One of the United States Constitution on the powers of Congress, not Article Two of the United States Constitution on the powers of the executive branch.

On May 22, Noem attempted to revoke the Student and Exchange Visitor Program certification for Harvard University (see Education policy of the second Donald Trump administration).

During a news conference in Los Angeles on June 12, Noem failed to recognize the senior U.S. Senator from California, Alex Padilla, who was present at the news conference. When Padilla attempted to ask Noem a question, he was forcibly removed from the room, pushed to the ground, and handcuffed by FBI and Secret Service agents.

In June 2025, ProPublica reported that Noem failed to disclose past income from a dark-money group in her federal ethics filings when she joined DHS, which ethics experts say violates disclosure rules. In November, ProPublica announced that a firm tied to Noem had received $200 million in DHS ad contracts during the government shutdown. The firm, Strategy Group, has multiple ties with Noem and her political career. DHS aides including James H. Percival, Troy Edgar, and Robert T. Law were all named in official investigations into the department's contracting processes.

Noem was nicknamed "ICE Barbie" because of her frequent photo ops with ICE at its raids.

In August 2025, Noem announced that 1.6 million unauthorized immigrants had left the United States since January of that year.

=== Deportation of U.S. service members and veterans ===
Decertification letter sent by Noem on May 22, 2025

During a December 12, 2025, committee hearing, U.S. Representative Seth Magaziner asked Noem how many U.S. veterans DHS had deported. She replied that they had not deported any. He then showed, via Zoom, Purple Heart recipient and green-card holder Sae Joon Park, who had been deported during her tenure as Secretary. Magaziner said Park had "sacrificed more for this country than most people ever have."

Park legally immigrated to the U.S. from South Korea when he was 7, grew up in Los Angeles and the San Fernando Valley, and enlisted in the U.S. Army after graduating from Notre Dame High School in Sherman Oaks in 1988. He was deployed to Panama in 1989 during Operation Just Cause and wounded by enemy gunfire. After leaving the Army, Park suffered from PTSD, and his family's business burned to the ground during the 1992 Los Angeles riots. He moved to Hawaii, and in 2009, he was arrested for attempting to buy cocaine. Federal authorities allowed Park to stay in the U.S. as long as he made regular check-ins, which he did until June 2025, when he was told to self-deport or be deported by DHS officials. DHS Assistant Secretary Tricia McLaughlin said Park had an "extensive criminal history" and had been given a final removal order, with the option to self-deport. Representative Delia Ramirez has since called for Noem to resign or be impeached due to her statements to Congress and wants a Congressional investigation into possible violations.

=== Criticism over use of Coast Guard resources ===
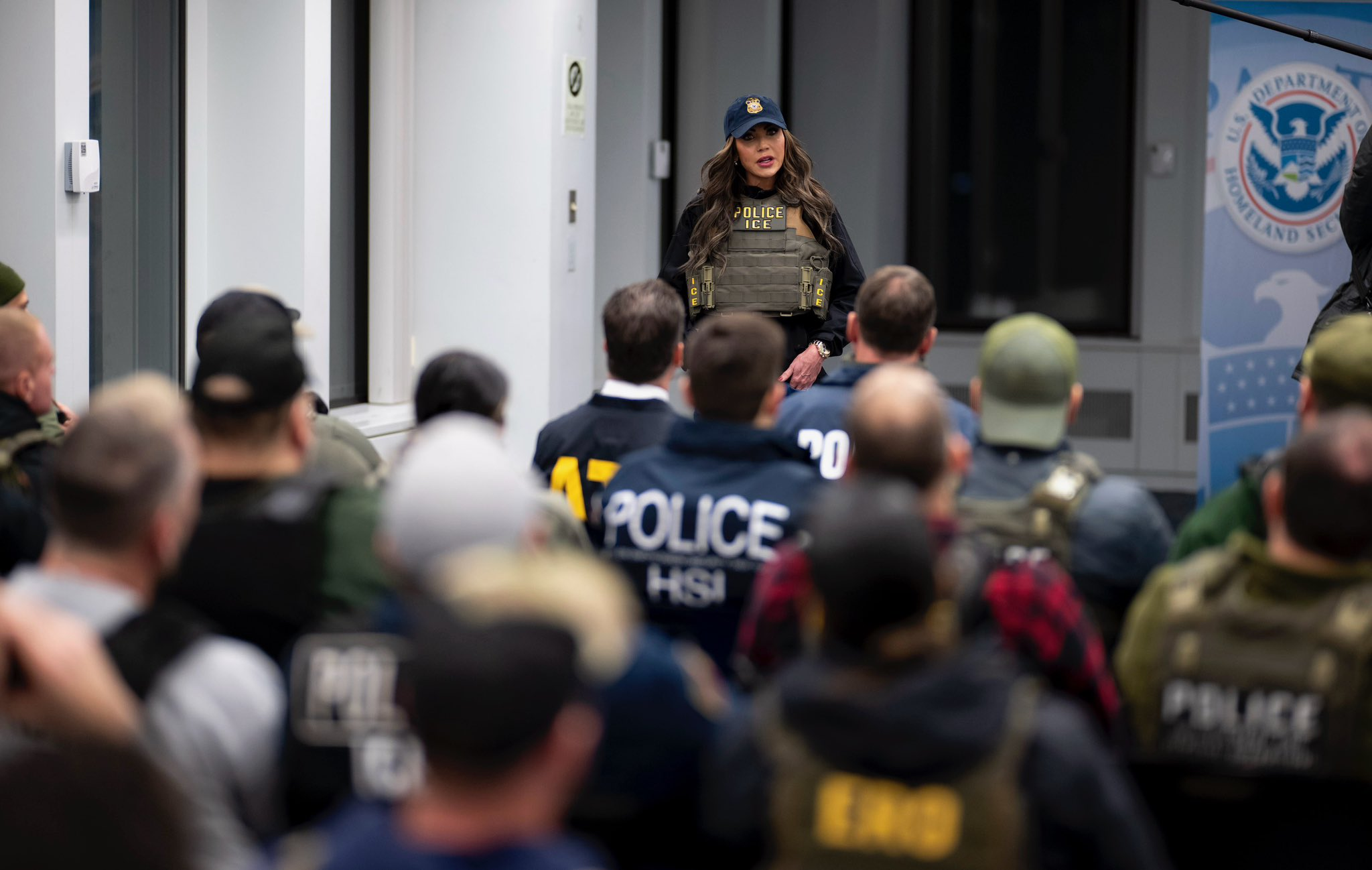
Noem speaking to law enforcement agents during an ICE raid in January 2025

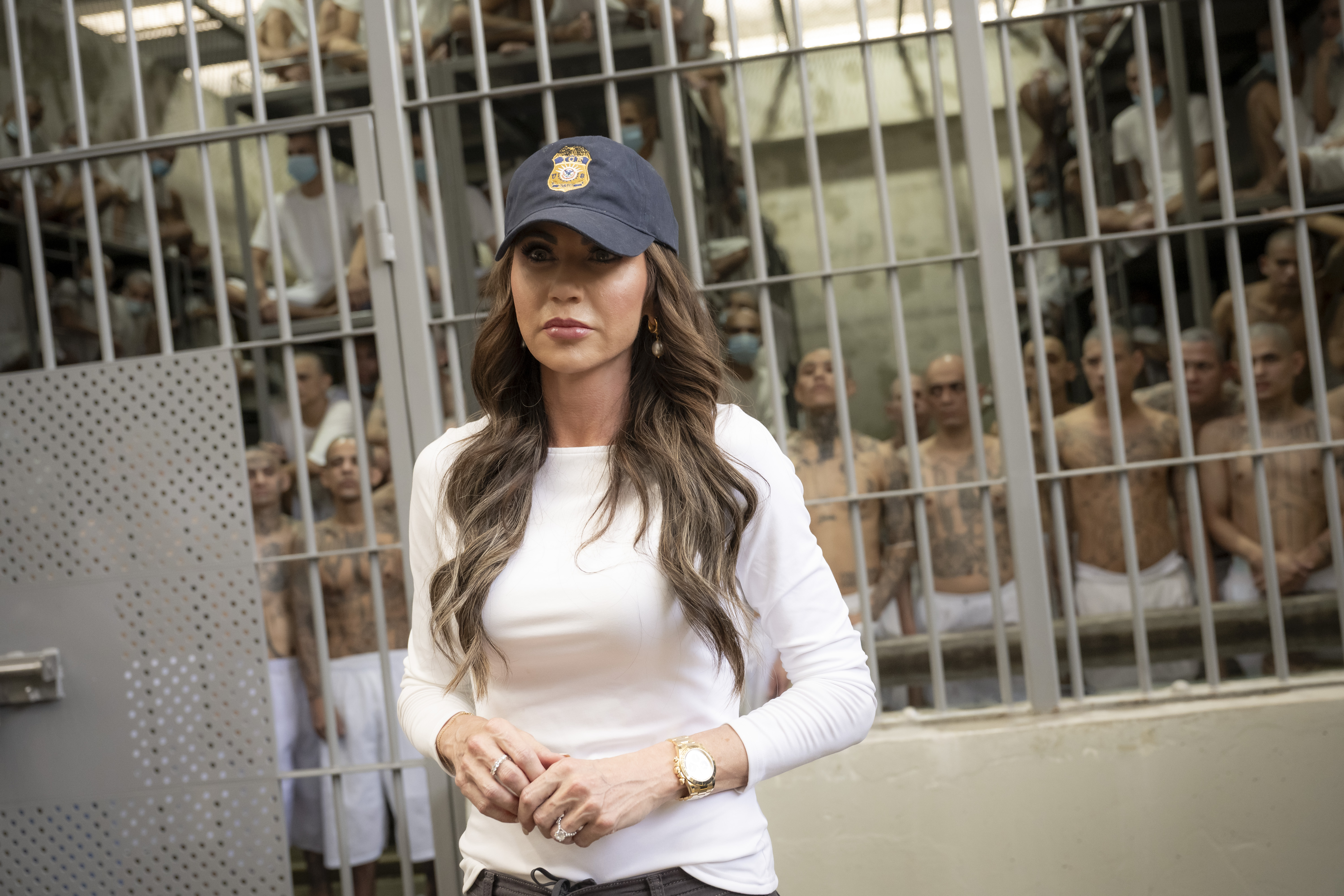
Noem at the CECOT security prison in El Salvador in March 2025

The Coast Guard has said that several of Noem's actions and directives have caused strain between it and DHS, especially downgrading search and rescue, a core USCG mission to secondary to ICE deportation missions. This began in February 2025, when Noem told the National Command Center to divert a USCG C-130 Hercules from a search and rescue mission for a coast guardsman who had gone overboard. The USCG commander in San Diego sent two C-27 Spartans to Texas for the deportation mission and kept the C-130 on the search. DHS has denied that it ordered the aircraft to suspend the search.

During Noem's tenure, more than 886 USCG flights were redirected to deportation missions transporting 9,805 migrants in fiscal year 2025. The Coast Guard called the flights routine and a typical use of multi-mission aircraft.

Noem's advisor Corey Lewandowski also fired a USCG pilot during a mission because Noem's blanket had been left on another aircraft. DHS assistant secretary Tricia McLaughlin denied that the incident took place. Lewandowski reportedly entered the aircraft flight deck while the plane was still climbing but not yet at 10,000 feet, which is widely considered unsafe behavior.

Noem was criticized for living rent-free in the Coast Guard Commandant's residence at Joint Base Anacostia–Bolling. She had taken occupancy of the waterfront home after the previous resident, Coast Guard Commandant and Four Star Admiral Linda Fagan, recently fired by President Trump, had been given only three hours' notice on February 4, 2025, to vacate the residence. DHS officials said that Noem was paying fair market value for the temporary use of the residence but provided no documentation to substantiate that claim.

=== Criticism over ICE-related actions ===
In January 2026, there were widespread protests over United States Immigration and Customs Enforcement (ICE) actions in Minneapolis, actions that then DHS Secretary Noem strongly supported. On January 7, 2026, Renée Good, a U.S. citizen, was shot and killed by an ICE agent in Minneapolis. The killing sparked massive protests in Minneapolis and in cities across the country, including Chicago, New York City, Los Angeles, San Francisco, Seattle, and Washington, D.C. Marches in Minneapolis prompted the closing of public schools and the deployment of more police officers. Federal agents used tear gas and pepper spray against protesters; an eyewitness to the shooting said, "People in our neighborhood have been terrorized by ICE for six weeks."

Minnesota Attorney General Keith Ellison, along with the cities of Minneapolis and Saint Paul, sued the Department of Homeland Security (DHS) to halt ICE deployments. The incident intensified national debate over immigration enforcement and renewed calls to abolish ICE. Dakota tribal leaders protested ICE's questionable detention of five Dakota citizens in Minneapolis. On January 24, during a protest demonstration, two ICE agents killed Alex Pretti, a U.S. citizen and ICU nurse for the U.S. Department of Veterans Affairs.

Noem defended the killings of Good and Pretti by federal agents before any investigation began, which led some lawmakers to call for her resignation or impeachment, and caused several political analysts to question the blaming of victims and the exoneration of federal agents. Vice President JD Vance strongly supported Noem and the aggressive immigration enforcement operations by ICE.

==== Impeachment proceedings ====
In January 2026, Noem made "unfounded claims" that Alex Pretti, the U.S. citizen shot dead by Customs and Border Protection (CBP) officers during protests against ICE in Minneapolis, had committed an act of "domestic terrorism". On January 14, Representative Robin Kelly introduced three articles of impeachment against Noem. She alleged Noem had obstructed congressional oversight of ICE facilities; violated public trust regarding arrests and the use of force; and engaged in self-dealing by awarding the contract for a $200 million taxpayer-funded recruitment campaign to the husband of Tricia McLaughlin. As of the filing, 70 representatives had signaled their support for the proceedings.

=== Misuse of funds, questionable dealings, and re-appointment ===
Noem testifies before the Senate Judiciary Committee and the House Judiciary Committee on March 3 and 4, 2026, respectively. Her performance in these two hearings, specifically the former, ultimately led to her firing.

In March 2026, The Wall Street Journal reported that Trump was preparing to fire Noem amid fallout from a Senate Judiciary Committee hearing a few days earlier in which she was criticized for her handling of the killings of Renée Good and Alex Pretti, her relationship with Lewandowski, the use of more than $220 million in government funds on TV advertisements, and the additional use of more than $300 million on three private luxury jets that were to be retrofitted for use by the department. One of the aircraft was a luxury-configured Boeing 737 MAX 8 that officials said might also be eventually used for deportations. The New York Times reported that another of her private jets had its own bedroom and 18 seats.

According to political analysts, Trump decided to fire Noem from DHS after her congressional hearing in which she said Trump had approved the $200 million-plus government-funded DHS advertising campaign that prominently featured her. On March 5, Trump announced that he had reassigned Noem to a new position, "Special Envoy for The Shield of the Americas", and that he would nominate Oklahoma senator Markwayne Mullin to succeed Noem at DHS. Mullin was sworn in on March 24. Noem was the first Cabinet official to leave her post during Trump's second term.

== Special Envoy for the Shield of the Americas (2026) ==
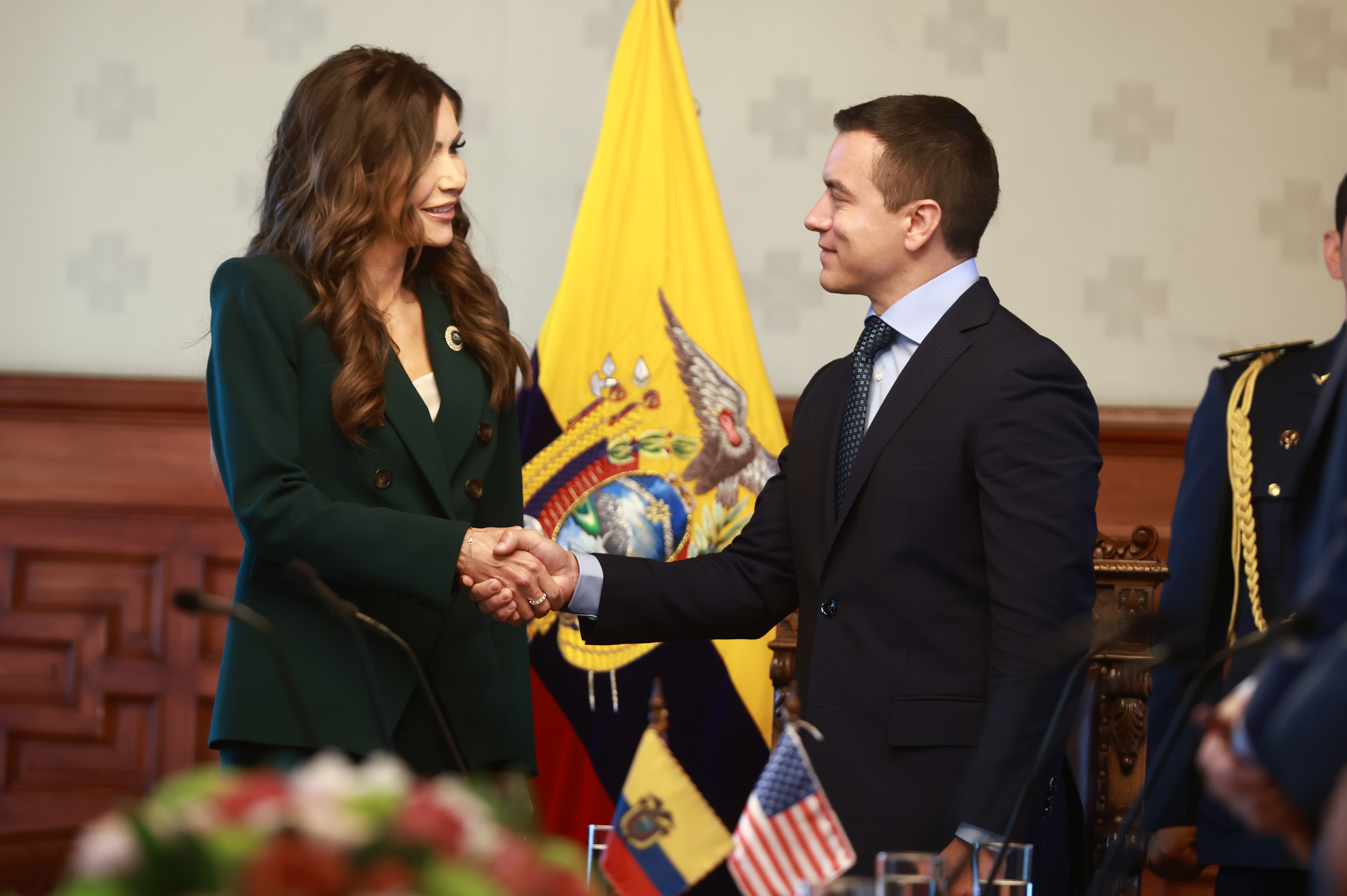
Kristi Noem and President Daniel Noboa, July 2025

In March 2026, Noem was appointed Special Envoy for the Shield of the Americas, a US-led regional security organization focused on coordinating efforts to combat organized crime, drug trafficking, and illegal immigration throughout the western hemisphere. She is responsible for coordination between US agencies and foreign counterparts on intelligence sharing, border security, and drug trade operations, and has also represented the US in several multilateral discussions and bilateral engagements across the region. In September 2026, her six-month special envoy status expired.

=== Relations with Ecuador ===
As Secretary of Homeland Security, Noem made multiple visits to Ecuador and developed a working relationship with President Daniel Noboa. Agreements were made to cooperate on efforts against transnational organized crime, and intelligence sharing was discussed.

Since her appointment as Special Envoy, Noem has prioritized Ecuador as a regional partner, visiting it for the first time in her new capacity on March 25, 2026. During this visit, Noboa awarded Noem the National Order of Merit in the grade of Grand Cross, one of Ecuador's highest civilian honors, in recognition of her role in strengthening cooperation between the two nations.

Through her ties with Noboa, Noem expanded US operational involvement in Ecuador as part of a wider initiative targeting Latin American drug trafficking. In March, United States Southern Command initiated joint operations with the Ecuadorian Armed Forces to attack "narco-terrorist" organizations operating in the country, including bombing operations against alleged cartel training camps near the Colombian border associated with the Comandos de la Frontera (a dissident FARC group). These operations used aircraft, drones, and ground assets. On March 19, Noem introduced the first permanent US Federal Bureau of Investigation office in Ecuador. Agents work alongside Ecuadorian authorities on investigations of drug trafficking and money laundering.

== Senior Advisor to the Deputy Secretary of State ==
In October 2026, CNN reported that an anonymous State Department official had said that after her six-month special envoy status expired, Noem had been made Senior Advisor to Deputy Secretary of State Christopher Landau, to whom she had previously reported in her official capacity as special envoy; she continues to work on the Shield of the Americas portfolio.

== Presidential endorsements ==
=== 2020 presidential endorsement ===
In 2020, the Trump-Pence ticket carried South Dakota, receiving 261,043 votes to 150,471 for the Biden-Harris ticket. Noem was initially designated one of Trump's three presidential electors for South Dakota, but later withdrew.

Noem has claimed that the 2020 presidential election, in which Biden defeated Trump, was marred by widespread voter fraud; no evidence supports this claim. On December 8, 2020, Noem tacitly acknowledged the outcome of the election when she referred to a "Biden administration" during her annual state budget address, but even after Biden was inaugurated in January, she still refused to accept that the election was "free and fair".

After the U.S. Capitol was attacked by a pro-Trump mob on January 6, 2021, disrupting the counting of the electoral votes formalizing Biden's victory, Noem spoke out against the violence, saying: "We are all entitled to peacefully protest. Violence is not a part of that." One day after calling for peace and reconciliation in the aftermath of the assault on the Capitol, Noem called the two newly elected Democratic senators from Georgia, Jon Ossoff and Raphael Warnock, "communists" in an op-ed for The Federalist, prompting criticism from South Dakota Democrats.

=== 2024 presidential endorsement ===
Noem endorsed Trump in the 2024 Republican Party presidential primaries in September 2023, at a rally hosted for him in Rapid City, South Dakota. Trump invited her to appear with him at a March 2024 rally in Vandalia, Ohio.

During Trump's 2024 presidential campaign, commentators suggested that Noem was a potential running mate for Trump. In September 2023, when asked on Newsmax if she would agree to serve as Trump's running mate, Noem responded that she would "in a heartbeat". At the February 2024 CPAC conference, Noem tied with Vivek Ramaswamy as attendees' top choice for Trump's running mate, with each receiving 15% of the vote in a straw poll. Also that month, Trump acknowledged that Noem was one of the names on his shortlist to be his running mate. In March 2024, CNN reported that Noem was one of four people Trump had shown increased interest in selecting as his running mate.

In April 2024, insiders said that her odds of being selected as Trump's running mate had waned due to her stance on abortion and the revelation in her book No Going Back that she shot and killed her pet dog and a goat. It was noted that "additions, subtractions and the emergence of dark-horse candidates remain possible", but on June 5, NBC News reported that Noem was no longer on Trump's shortlist of running mates.

== Autobiographical debates ==
In April 2024, pre-release excerpts of Noem's second autobiography, No Going Back, were widely debated, criticized, and condemned. In the chapter "Bad Day to Be a Goat", Noem recounts that she brought her family's 14-month-old female wirehaired pointer, Cricket, along for a pheasant hunt with guests at her family's hunting lodge. Expecting Cricket to emulate the older, trained, dogs on the hunt, Noem instead felt that Cricket ruined the hunt by "chasing all those birds and having the time of her life". After the dog killed several chickens that day, Noem decided Cricket was "dangerous" and "untrainable", and shot the dog dead in a gravel pit. She then killed her family's male goat, which she said was "disgusting, musky, rancid".

Noem initially responded that "tough decisions like this happen all the time on a farm", and later said the incident occurred 20 years ago and that "the fake news ... put the worst spin" on the story, as Cricket was a "working dog" that "came to us from a family who had found her way too aggressive ... a responsible owner does what they need to do". The story led to bipartisan criticism of Noem, and doubt that Trump would choose her as his vice-presidential running mate intensified. A fundraising dinner for Noem in Colorado scheduled for May 4 was canceled after the group and the hotel hosting the event received death threats.

Later in the memoir, Noem wrote of imagining herself becoming president in 2025, taking over from Biden, and that the first thing she would do would be to "make sure Joe Biden's dog was nowhere on the grounds ('Commander, say hello to Cricket for me')", in an apparent suggestion that Commander be killed. Months earlier, Commander had been moved out of the White House after having bitten Secret Service agents and others on over a dozen occasions. In an interview, Noem said that Biden was "accountable" and called for him to "make a decision" on "what to do" about Commander.

Noem also falsely claimed in her memoir to have met the North Korean dictator Kim Jong Un, writing, "I'm sure he underestimated me, having no clue about my experience staring down little tyrants (I'd been a children's pastor, after all). Dealing with foreign leaders takes resolve, preparation, and determination." Her spokesperson said the claim was an error and would be expunged from the book's future editions. Noem also wrote in the book that she was once "slated to meet with French president Emmanuel Macron", but called off the meeting because he made a "very pro-Hamas and anti-Israel comment to the press"; the French government responded that it had neither invited Noem nor had any record of a scheduled meeting with her.

The Washington Post's literary critic Ron Charles wrote that the "description of Cricket's Last Stand is the one time in this howlingly dull book that Noem demonstrates any sense of setting, character, plot and emotional honesty. Otherwise, it's mostly a hodgepodge of worn chestnuts and conservative maxims".

== Personal life ==
=== Marriage ===
Kristi and Bryon Noem married in 1992, in Watertown, South Dakota. They have three children and four grandchildren. In 2011, when Noem moved to Washington, D.C., after her election to Congress, her family continued to live on a ranch near Castlewood, South Dakota.

In September 2021, conservative media outlet American Greatness reported that Noem was having an extramarital affair with political operative Corey Lewandowski. Noem called the report a "disgusting lie", saying, "these old, tired attacks on conservative women are based on a falsehood that we can't achieve anything without a man's help." In September 2025, New York magazine reported that the romantic relationship between Noem and Lewandowski was ongoing, and that Lewandowski played a significant role in running the Department of Homeland Security, acting as Noem's "de facto chief of staff".

In 2026, Axios reporter Marc Caputo received a tip that an online sex worker wanted to go public about Bryon Noem engaging in bimbofication role play. The Daily Mail reported that Bryon sent $25,000 to sex workers, telling them that he enjoyed "huge, huge ridiculous boobs". The Mail published a photograph depicting Bryon wearing tight pink shorts and a peach crop top while using balloons to simulate breasts. A representative for the Noem family said Kristi was "devastated" and that the family had asked for privacy and prayers. The outlets LGBTQ Nation and Them wrote that Bryon's alleged cross-dressing stood in contrast with Kristi's history of opposition to drag entertainment and queer and trans rights.

On April 6, 2026, Noem filed for divorce from her husband in Hamlin County, South Dakota, citing irreconcilable differences.

=== Religion and public image ===
Noem is a Protestant. As of 2018, her family attended a Foursquare Church in Watertown.

In August 2024, at the South Dakota State Fair, Noem and her sister, Cindy Grantham, were inducted into the Daughters of the American Revolution by State Regent Katherine Tarrell.

In March 2024, Noem shared a video in which she identified herself as South Dakota's governor and promoted a cosmetic dentist business that she said helped her after she lost her front teeth in a biking accident years before: "I love my new family at Smile Texas!" Noem has since become one of the most prominent examples of so-called "Mar-a-Lago face", a cosmetic surgery trend among conservative women, also known as "Republican makeup".

In 2026 a statue of Noem was unveiled as part of the Trail of Governors. It features her with one of her horses, "Ice Man".

==== Other activities ====
In June 2026, Noem joined the Canadian mineral exploration firm NovaRed Mining as an adviser.

== Memoirs ==
- Noem, Kristi (2022). Not My First Rodeo. New York: Twelve. ISBN 978-1538707050.
- Noem, Kristi (2024). No Going Back. Nashville: Center Street. ISBN 978-1546008163.

== See also ==
- List of female governors in the United States
- List of female United States Cabinet members
- Women in conservatism in the United States
- Women in the United States House of Representatives
- Operation Salvo

== Electoral history ==
2022 South Dakota gubernatorial election
Party	Candidate	Votes	%
Republican	Kristi Noem (Incumbent)	217,035	61.9
Democratic	Jamie Smith	123,148	35.1
Libertarian	Tracey Quint	9,983	2.8
Total votes		350,166	100.0
Republican hold			

2022 Republican primary election – South Dakota governor
Party	Candidate	Votes	%
Republican	Kristi Noem (Incumbent)	91,661	76.4
Republican	Steven Haugaard	28,315	23.6
Total votes		119,976	100.0

2018 South Dakota gubernatorial election
Party	Candidate	Votes	%
Republican	Kristi Noem	172,912	51.0
Democratic	Billie Sutton	161,454	47.6
Libertarian	Kurt Evans	4,848	1.4
Total votes		339,214	100.0
Republican hold			

2018 Republican primary election – South Dakota governor
Party	Candidate	Votes	%
Republican	Kristi Noem	57,437	56.0
Republican	Marty Jackley	45,069	44.0
Total votes		102,506	100.0

2016 South Dakota's at-large congressional district election
Party	Candidate	Votes	%
Republican	Kristi Noem (Incumbent)	237,163	64.1
Democratic	Paula Hawks	132,810	35.9
Total votes		369,973	100.0

South Dakota's at-large congressional district election, 2014
Party	Candidate	Votes	%
Republican	Kristi Noem (Incumbent)	183,834	66.5
Democratic	Corinna Robinson	92,485	33.5
Total votes		276,319	100.0

2012 South Dakota's at-large congressional district election
Party	Candidate	Votes	%
Republican	Kristi Noem (Incumbent)	207,640	57.4
Democratic	Matt Varilek	153,789	42.6
Total votes		361,429	100.0
Republican hold			

2010 General election – At Large Congressional District of South Dakota
Party	Candidate	Votes	%
Republican	Kristi Noem	153,703	48.1
Democratic	Stephanie Herseth Sandlin (Incumbent)	146,589	45.9
Independent	B. Thomas Marking	19,134	6.0
Total votes		319,426	100.0
Republican gain from Democratic			

2010 Republican primary election – At Large Congressional District of South Dakota
Party	Candidate	Votes	%
Republican	Kristi Noem	34,527	42.1
Republican	Chris Nelson	28,380	34.6
Republican	Blake Curd	19,134	23.3
Total votes		82,041	100.0

U.S. House of Representatives
Preceded by Stephanie Herseth Sandlin	Member of the U.S. House of Representatives from South Dakota's at-large congressional district 2011–2019	Succeeded by Dusty Johnson
Preceded by Jaime Herrera Beutler	Chair of the Congressional Women's Caucus; 2015–2017	Succeeded by Susan Brooks
Party political offices
Preceded by Dennis Daugaard	Republican nominee for Governor of South Dakota; 2018, 2022	Succeeded by Larry Rhoden
Political offices
Preceded by Dennis Daugaard	Governor of South Dakota; 2019–2025	Succeeded by Larry Rhoden
Preceded by Alejandro Mayorkas	United States Secretary of Homeland Security; 2025–2026	Succeeded by Markwayne Mullin
U.S. order of precedence (ceremonial)
Preceded by Marty Walsh as Former U.S. Cabinet Member	Order of precedence of the United States as Former U.S. Cabinet Member	Succeeded by Pam Bondi as Former U.S. Cabinet Member
