= Susan Wismer =

American politician (born 1955)

Member of the South Dakota Senate from the 1st district
- In office January 2017 – January 12, 2021
- Preceded by: Dennis Feickert
- Succeeded by: Michael Rohl

Member of the South Dakota House of Representatives from the 1st district
- In office January 13, 2009 – January 2015
- Preceded by: Clayton Halverson
- Succeeded by: Steven McCleerey

Personal details
- Born: December 13, 1955 (age 70) Britton, South Dakota, U.S.
- Party: Independent (2022–present); Democratic (until 2022)
- Spouse: Mark
- Children: 3
- Education: Augustana University (BA)

Susan M. Wismer (born December 13, 1955) is an American politician and a former Democratic member of the South Dakota House of Representatives who represented District 1. Wismer was the Democratic nominee in the 2014 South Dakota gubernatorial election.

== Biography ==
Susan M. (Jones) Wismer was born in Britton, South Dakota to Maurice and Dorthy Jones. She's the oldest of six siblings and grew up on the family farm in northeast South Dakota. She attended Britton Elementary and High schools (now Britton-Hecla) and graduated with a degree in English from Augustana College in 1978. After college she taught high school English for a year in Iowa. In 1979, Susan married Mark Wismer, also of Britton. She and Mark moved to Washington for his job, and she studied and became a certified public accountant. In 1983, Susan and Mark moved back to Britton with their newborn son, and continued to raise their children, three in all, in South Dakota close to family. Upon their return to Britton, Wismer and one of her sisters founded, and currently own and operate, Britton Bookkeeping and Tax Service. All of Wismer's children attended in-state universities.

Wismer has always been an active member of her hometown church, First Presbyterian, in Britton. She has served as an elder, vocal and bell choir member, Sunday school teacher and has volunteered her time to serve on many local and Presbytery-wide committees.

Many family members have been active in politics. Wismer's grandfather, Art Jones, was the first president of Basin Electric and a legislator. Her uncle, Curtis 'Curtie' Jones also served in the legislature from 1971 to 1986 and was a Regent on the South Dakota Board of Regents. As a high school student, Susan served as an intern in the South Dakota legislature. In 2008, once all of her children had graduated high school, she ran for the South Dakota House of Representatives to represent District One which include Roberts, Day, Marshall, and parts of Brown County. Wismer is now in her 3rd term (6th year). Wismer has served on the Appropriations Committee since the beginning of her legislative service. She is a current member of Government Operations and Audit Committee, and has served on the legislative redistricting and various summer study committees. She is a representative to the Midwestern Higher Education Compact and on the planning committee for the International Legislators Conference. She is an alumna of the Midwestern Council of State Government's Bowhay Legislative Leadership Development Program. She was a member of the first class of South Dakota Ag and Rural Leadership.

== Elections ==
- 2012 With incumbent Democratic representative David Sigdestad leaving the Legislature and leaving a District 1 seat open, Wismer and Dennis Feickert were unopposed for both the June 5, 2012 Democratic primary and the November 6, 2012, general election, where Feickert took the first seat and Wismer took the second seat with 4,833 votes (44.8%).
- 2008 When District 1 incumbent Democratic representatives David Sigdestad was term limited and Clayton Halverson left the Legislature leaving both District 1 seats open, Wismer ran in the four-way June 3, 2008 Democratic primary and placed first with 2,073 votes (34.49%), in the five-way November 4, 2008 general election fellow Democratic nominee Jason Frerichs took the first seat and Wismer took the second seat with 4,940 votes (31.22%) ahead of Republican nominees Ron Olson, Scott German, and Constitution candidate Franklin de Padilla.
- 2010 With incumbent Democratic representative Frerichs ran for South Dakota Senate and left a District 1 seat open, Wismer and former representative Sigdestad were unopposed for both the June 8, 2010 Democratic primary and the November 2, 2010, general election, where former representative Sigdestad took the first seat and Wismer took the second seat with 4,336 votes (49.79%).

Party political offices
Preceded by Scott Heidepriem	Democratic nominee for Governor of South Dakota; 2014	Succeeded by Billie Sutton
