= Billie Sutton =

American politician

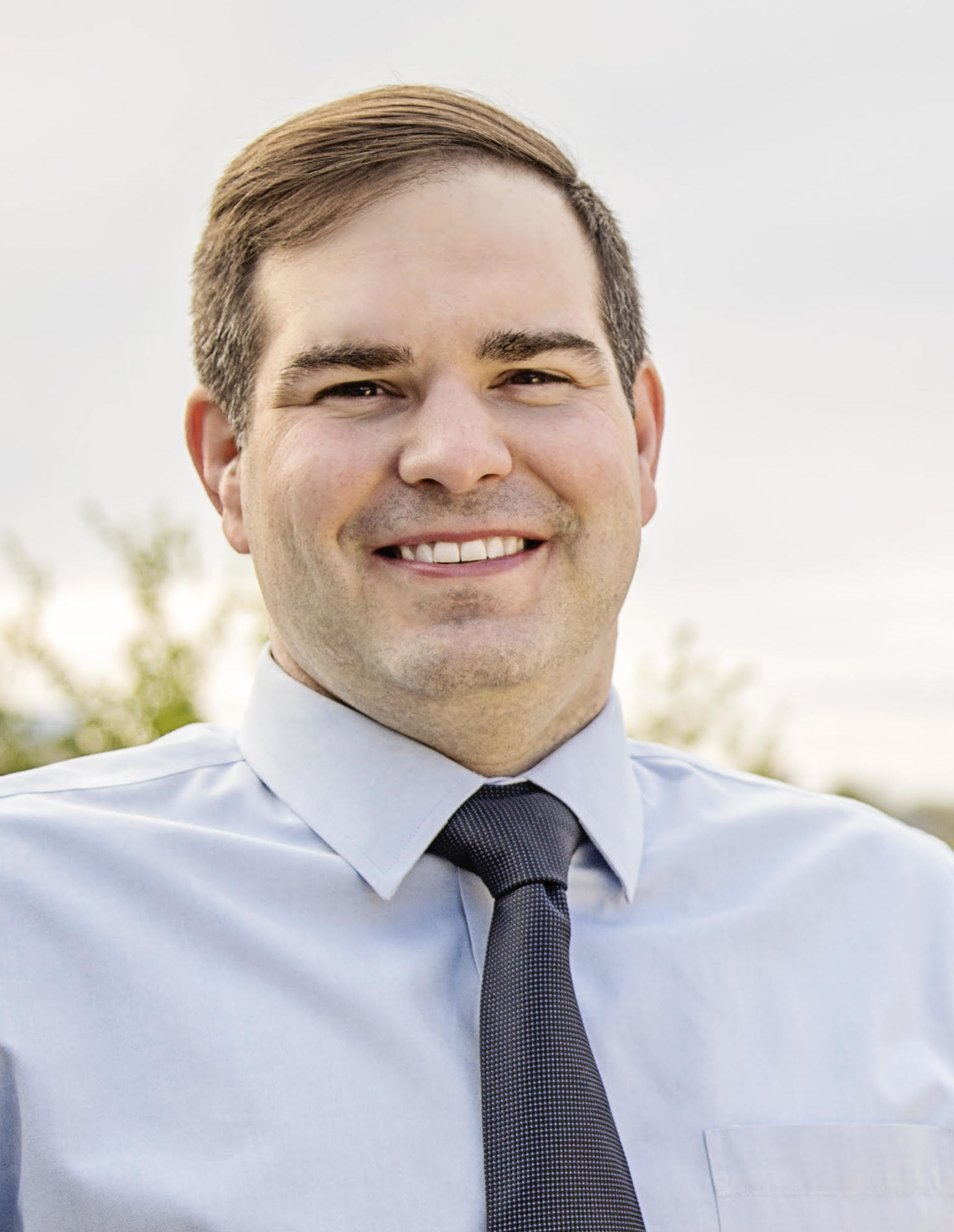

Minority Leader of the South Dakota Senate
- In office January 5, 2015 – January 8, 2019
- Preceded by: Jason Frerichs
- Succeeded by: Troy Heinert

Member of the South Dakota Senate from the 21st district
- In office January 3, 2011 – January 8, 2019
- Preceded by: Julie Bartling
- Succeeded by: Rocky Blare

Personal details
- Born: Billie Harmon Sutton; March 16, 1984 (age 42) Burke, South Dakota, U.S.
- Party: Democratic
- Spouse: Kelsea
- Children: 3
- Education: University of Wyoming (BA)
- Website: Campaign website

Billie Harmon Sutton (born March 16, 1984) is an American former professional bronc rider and politician. He was a member of the South Dakota Senate from 2011 to 2019, served as Minority Leader, and was the 2018 Democratic nominee for Governor of South Dakota, which he narrowly lost to Republican nominee Kristi Noem in the general election.

== Early life, education, and rodeo accident ==
A fifth-generation South Dakotan, Sutton grew up in Burke, South Dakota, on his family ranch, where his interest in rodeo began. His grandfather, the late Billie Sutton, was a member of the state Senate, and the 1982 Democratic nominee for Lieutenant Governor of South Dakota. Sutton went to college at the University of Wyoming and became a successful rider as the university's all-time leader in rodeo points. He graduated in May 2008 with a degree in finance.

Sutton competed professionally on the PRCA circuit, reaching a top 30 worldwide ranking. In 2007, Sutton was paralyzed from the waist down when his horse flipped upside down in the chute prior to a bronc ride at a rodeo in Minot, North Dakota. He was 23 years old at the time of the accident.

After the accident and completion of his college degree, Sutton returned to Burke to work as an investment consultant at a bank.

== Political career ==
In 2010, Sutton was elected to the South Dakota Senate, representing District 21. He served as Senate Assistant Minority Leader from 2013 to 2015. He was succeeded in this position by Troy Heinert from District 26. In 2015, Sutton became the South Dakota Senate's Minority Leader.

In May 2017, Sutton announced his candidacy for Governor of South Dakota in 2018 at his family ranch in Burke, SD. Michelle Lavallee of Sioux Falls, a former Republican, was the lieutenant governor candidate on Sutton's ticket. Sutton lost in the 2018 South Dakota gubernatorial election, 51.0 to 47.6 percent, in the closest gubernatorial election in South Dakota since 1986.

=== Endorsements ===
The Sioux Falls Argus Leader and Rapid City Journal endorsed Sutton for South Dakota Governor in 2018. Sutton was also endorsed by a number of prominent Republicans, including former U.S. Senator Larry Pressler, former State Senate Majority Leader Dave Knudson, former state treasurer Dave Volk, former mayor of Sioux Falls Rick Knobe, and current Lincoln County Commissioner Jim Schmidt, among others.

=== Political views ===
Sutton is a "pro-Second Amendment" moderate Democrat with an anti-corruption focus.

== Personal life ==
Though he was paralyzed as a result of his rodeo career, he kept his appreciation of horse riding, an activity he still enjoys alongside his wife Kelsea. Sutton and his wife have three sons. A daughter, Lenore, was born July 8, 2020, but died a week later. In August 2022, a community splash pad in Burke named Lenny's Lily Pad was opened in memorial of his daughter.

== Electoral history ==
Year	Office	Result
2018	Governor of South Dakota	Sutton was unopposed in the Democratic primary and was defeated in the general election by Kristi Noem (R) with 161,454 votes (47.6%) to Noem's 172,912 votes (51.0%).
2016	State Senate	Sutton was unopposed in the Democratic primary and in the general election.
2014	State Senate	Sutton was unopposed in the Democratic primary and in the general election.
2012	State Senate	Sutton was unopposed in the Democratic primary and defeated John S. Meyer (R) in the general election with 5723 votes (59.46%) to Meyer's 3902 (40.54%).
2010	State Senate	Sutton defeated John S. Meyer (R) in the general election with 4167 votes (57.78%) to Meyer's 3045 (42.22%).

South Dakota Senate
Preceded by Jason Frerichs	Minority Leader of the South Dakota Senate; 2015–2019	Succeeded by Troy Heinert
Party political offices
Preceded by Susan Wismer	Democratic nominee for Governor of South Dakota; 2018	Succeeded by Jamie Smith
