= Clayton Halverson =

American politician

Member of the South Dakota House of Representatives from the 1st district
- In office 2005–2008
- Succeeded by: Susan Wismer

Personal details
- Party: Democratic
- Spouse: Bonnie
- Occupation: farmer

Clayton J. Halverson was a Democratic member of the South Dakota House of Representatives from 2005 to 2008.
