= Jason Frerichs =

American politician

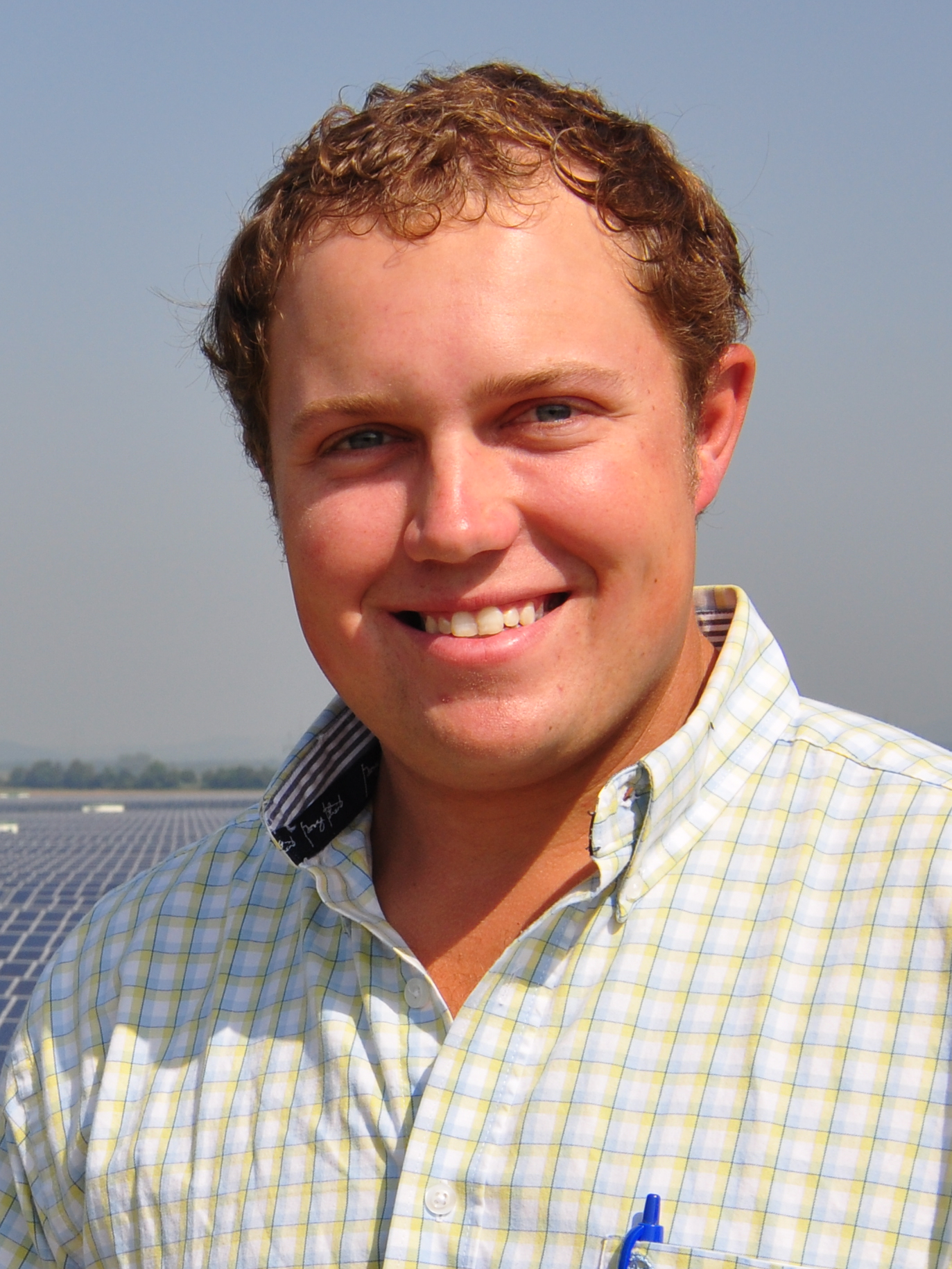
- Frerichs in Germany (2011)

Minority Leader of the South Dakota Senate
- In office January 3, 2011 – January 4, 2015
- Preceded by: Scott Heidepriem
- Succeeded by: Billie Sutton

Minority Whip of the South Dakota Senate
- In office January 11, 2017 – January 8, 2019
- Preceded by: Scott Parsley; Jim Peterson
- Succeeded by: Reynold Nesiba

Member of the South Dakota Senate from the 1st district
- In office January 3, 2011 – January 8, 2019
- Preceded by: Gary D. Hanson
- Succeeded by: Susan Wismer

Member of the South Dakota House of Representatives from the 1st district
- In office January 13, 2009 – January 2, 2011 Serving with Susan Wismer
- Preceded by: Clayton Halverson; David Sigdestad
- Succeeded by: David Sigdestad; Susan Wismer

Personal details
- Born: November 24, 1984 (age 41)
- Party: Democratic
- Education: South Dakota State University
- Profession: Farmer, rancher

Jason Elliott Frerichs (born November 24, 1984) is a former state senator and state representative from South Dakota.

== Early life and education ==
Frerichs graduated from South Dakota State University in 2007, earning a B.S. in Agriculture Education. He is the president of the Roberts County Farmers Union. He lives in Wilmot, South Dakota. Frerichs owns and works on a farm with his father and brothers, and also manages 150 cows. Frerichs teaches agriculture at Lake Area Technical Institute, and is an FFA adviser.

Frerichs' father, grandfather, and great-grandfather all served in the South Dakota House of Representatives. Frerichs served as a page in both the South Dakota Legislature and the United States Senate, working for Senator Tom Daschle.

== Political career ==
Frerichs served in the South Dakota State House of Representatives from 2008 to 2010, where he was the minority whip. In 2010, he was elected to the state senate, becoming minority leader. Frerichs was a member of the Agriculture and Natural Resources Committee, the Legislative Procedure Committee, and the State Affairs. In 2010, he defeated fellow state senator Eldon Nygaard in the race for senate minority leader; Nygaard switched to the Republican Party shortly after.

Frerichs advocates the development of renewable energy in South Dakota. He is considered to be an ally of former Representative Stephanie Herseth Sandlin.
