= 2014 South Dakota gubernatorial election =

- November 4, 2014
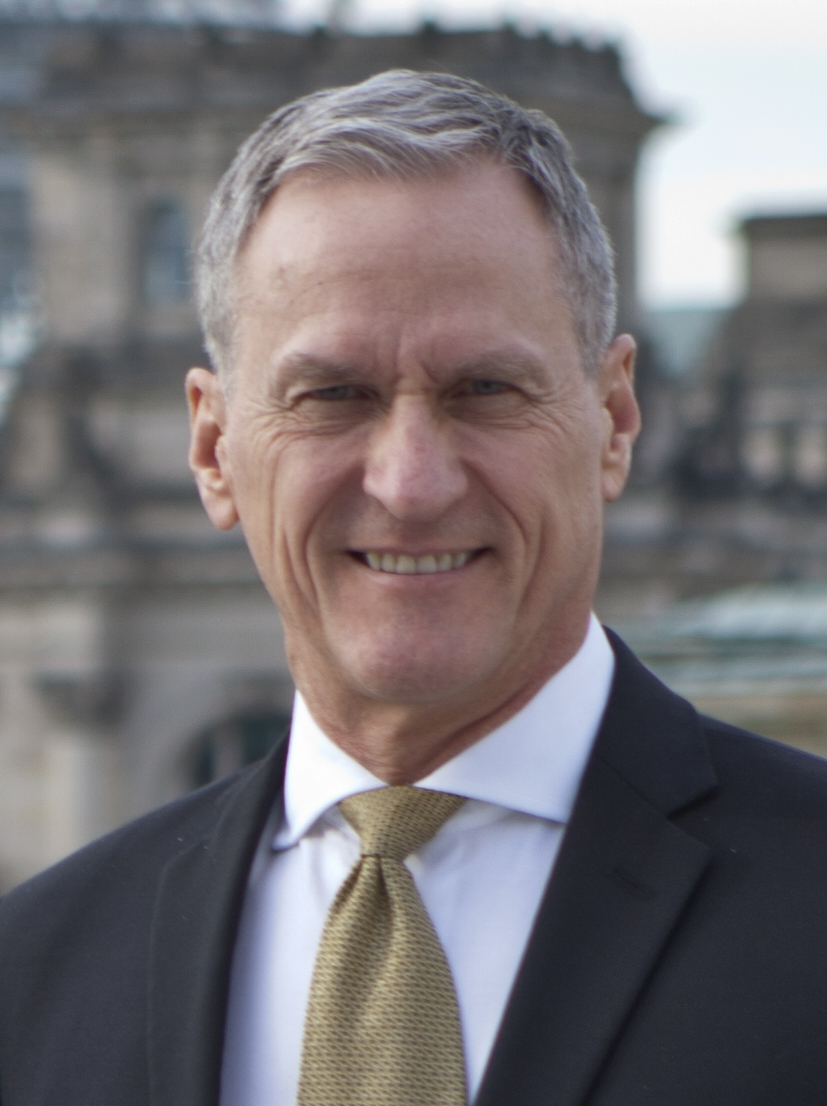

Nominee	Dennis Daugaard	Susan Wismer
Party	Republican	Democratic
Running mate	Matt Michels	Susy Blake
Popular vote	195,477	70,549
Percentage	70.47%	25.43%
- Daugaard: 40–50% 50–60% 60–70% 70–80% 80–90% >90% Wismer: 40–50% 50–60% 60–70% 70–80% Tie: 40–50%
Governor before election
Dennis Daugaard
Republican
Elected Governor
Dennis Daugaard
Republican

The 2014 South Dakota gubernatorial election took place on November 4, 2014, to elect the governor and lieutenant governor of South Dakota, concurrently with the election of South Dakota's Class II U.S. Senate seat, as well as other elections to the United States Senate in other states, elections to the United States House of Representatives, and various state and local elections.

Incumbent Republican governor Dennis Daugaard ran for re-election to a second term in office. He won the Republican primary and ran again with incumbent lieutenant governor Matt Michels. The Democrats nominated State Representative Susan Wismer, who chose former state representative Susy Blake as her running mate. Independent Mike Myers also ran, whose running mate was former Republican state representative Lora Hubbel.

== Republican primary ==
=== Candidates ===
==== Declared ====
- Dennis Daugaard, incumbent governor
- Lora Hubbel, former state representative and former chair of the Minnehaha County Republican Party

==== Declined ====
- Stan Adelstein, state senator
- Stace Nelson, state representative (running for the U.S. Senate)

=== Results ===
Republican primary results
Party	Candidate	Votes	%
Republican	Dennis Daugaard (incumbent)	60,017	80.87
Republican	Lora Hubbel	14,196	19.13
Total votes		74,213	100

== Democratic primary ==
=== Candidates ===
==== Declared ====
- Joe Lowe, former state director of wildland fire suppression and former mayor of Mission Viejo, California
- Susan Wismer, state representative

==== Declined ====
- Jason Frerichs, minority leader of the South Dakota Senate
- Bryce Healy, former commissioner of schools and public lands
- Scott Heidepriem, former state senator and nominee for governor in 2010
- Stephanie Herseth Sandlin, former U.S. representative
- Mike Huether, mayor of Sioux Falls (running for re-election)
- Steve Jarding, educator, lecturer and political consultant
- Pat O'Brien, author, television anchor and radio host

=== Results ===
Democratic primary results
Party	Candidate	Votes	%
Democratic	Susan Wismer	15,311	55.49
Democratic	Joe Lowe	12,283	44.51
Total votes		27,594	100

== Independents and third parties ==
=== Candidates ===
==== Declared ====
- Mike Myers (Independent), former University of South Dakota School of Law professor and former CEO of Mayo Clinic

- Running mate: Lora Hubbel, former Republican state representative and Republican candidate for governor in 2014. Myers' initial running mate was Caitlin Collier, an attorney and Democratic candidate for the state house in 2008. After Collier announced her withdrawal from the race in June 2014 because of a family illness, Myers attempted to replace her with Hubbel, who had run against Daugaard in the Republican primary. However, Secretary of State of South Dakota Jason Gant refused to remove Collier's name, saying that state law had no provision for replacing an Independent candidate on the ballot. In July, Myers sued the Secretary of State to allow him to change his running mate. On August 18, federal judge Lawrence L. Piersol of the United States District Court for the District of South Dakota ruled in Myers' favor.

==== Failed to make the ballot ====
- Curtis Strong (Constitution), Tea Party activist

== General election ==
=== Predictions ===
Source	Ranking	As of
The Cook Political Report	Solid R	November 3, 2014
Sabato's Crystal Ball	Safe R	November 3, 2014
Rothenberg Political Report	Safe R	November 3, 2014
Real Clear Politics	Safe R	November 3, 2014

=== Polling ===
Poll source	Date(s) administered	Sample size	Margin of error	Dennis Daugaard (R)	Susan Wismer (D)	Mike Myers (I)	Other	Undecided
Monmouth University	October 24–27, 2014	429	± 4.7%	68%	29%	1%	—	2%
SurveyUSA	October 21–26, 2014	611	± 4%	54%	34%	5%	—	7%
Mason-Dixon	October 20–23, 2014	800	± 3.5%	62%	26%	5%	—	7%
NBC News/Marist	October 19–23, 2014	730 LV	± 3.6%	67%	28%	—	1%	4%
NBC News/Marist	October 19–23, 2014	990 RV	± 3.1%	67%	26%	—	2%	5%
CBS News/NYT/YouGov	October 16–23, 2014	527	± 8%	54%	28%	—	3%	15%
Harper Polling	October 9–11, 2014	630	± 3.9%	53%	35%	—	8%	4%
SurveyUSA	October 1–5, 2014	616	± 4%	59%	30%	7%	—	5%
CBS News/NYT/YouGov	September 20–October 1, 2014	382	± 7%	57%	31%	—	2%	10%
Nielson Brothers Polling	September 21–25, 2014	607	± 3.35%	53%	28%	10%	—	9%
SurveyUSA	September 3–7, 2014	510	± 4.4%	54%	34%	6%	—	7%
CBS News/NYT/YouGov	August 18–September 2, 2014	526	± 6%	55%	28%	—	1%	16%
Nielson Brothers Polling	July 23–28, 2014	572	± 4.07%	53%	29%	7%	—	12%
CBS News/NYT/YouGov	July 5–24, 2014	630	± 4.5%	66%	27%	—	2%	5%
Rasmussen Reports	June 4–5, 2014	750	± 4%	55%	35%	—	3%	7%
SurveyUSA	May 6–10, 2014	504	± 4.5%	56%	23%	13%	—	9%

Hypothetical polling

Poll source	Date(s) administered	Sample size	Margin of error	Dennis Daugaard (R)	Joe Lowe (D)	Mike Myers (I)	Other	Undecided
SurveyUSA	May 6–10, 2014	504	± 4.5%	57%	21%	11%	—	10%
Rasmussen Reports	February 25–26, 2014	500	± 4.5%	63%	23%	—	5%	9%

=== Results ===
2014 South Dakota gubernatorial election
Party	Candidate	Votes	%	±%
Republican	Dennis Daugaard (incumbent)	195,477	70.47%	+8.96%
Democratic	Susan Wismer	70,549	25.43%	−13.06%
Independent	Michael J. Myers	11,377	4.10%	N/A
Total votes		277,403	100.00%	N/A
Republican hold				

==== By county ====
County	Dennis Daugaard Republican		Susan Wismer Democratic		Michael J. Myers Independent		Margin		Total
County	#	%	#	%	#	%	#	%	Total
Aurora	776	68.13%	312	27.39%	51	4.48%	464	40.74%	1,139
Beadle	3,974	70.91%	1,433	25.57%	197	3.52%	2,541	45.34%	5,604
Bennett	606	65.87%	276	30.00%	38	4.13%	330	35.87%	920
Bon Homme	1,718	71.64%	577	24.06%	103	4.30%	1,141	47.58%	2,398
Brookings	6,105	66.19%	2,792	30.27%	327	3.55%	3,313	35.92%	9,224
Brown	7,801	64.91%	3,864	32.15%	354	2.95%	3,937	32.76%	12,019
Brule	1,323	74.96%	388	21.98%	54	3.06%	935	52.97%	1,765
Buffalo	188	41.32%	244	53.63%	23	5.05%	-56	-12.31%	455
Butte	2,484	77.53%	513	16.01%	207	6.46%	1,971	61.52%	3,204
Campbell	516	82.96%	82	13.18%	24	3.86%	434	69.77%	622
Charles Mix	2,172	68.32%	893	28.09%	114	3.59%	1,279	40.23%	3,179
Clark	1,140	74.46%	324	21.16%	67	4.38%	816	53.30%	1,531
Clay	2,124	56.55%	1,372	36.53%	260	6.92%	752	20.02%	3,756
Codington	6,656	73.07%	2,158	23.69%	295	3.24%	4,498	49.38%	9,109
Corson	491	53.96%	363	39.89%	56	6.15%	128	14.07%	910
Custer	2,735	73.72%	780	21.02%	195	5.26%	1,955	52.70%	3,710
Davison	4,590	75.89%	1,255	20.75%	203	3.36%	3,335	55.14%	6,048
Day	1,256	52.25%	1,065	44.30%	83	3.45%	191	7.95%	2,404
Deuel	1,203	68.27%	484	27.47%	75	4.26%	719	40.81%	1,762
Dewey	721	49.52%	666	45.74%	69	4.74%	55	3.78%	1,456
Douglas	1,121	84.80%	171	12.93%	30	2.27%	950	71.86%	1,322
Edmunds	1,288	75.15%	380	22.17%	46	2.68%	908	52.98%	1,714
Fall River	2,125	72.95%	609	20.91%	179	6.14%	1,516	52.04%	2,913
Faulk	712	79.82%	157	17.60%	23	2.58%	555	62.22%	892
Grant	1,981	68.43%	827	28.57%	87	3.01%	1,154	39.86%	2,895
Gregory	1,369	75.76%	366	20.25%	72	3.98%	1,003	55.51%	1,807
Haakon	774	89.38%	72	8.31%	20	2.31%	702	81.06%	866
Hamlin	1,670	74.82%	472	21.15%	90	4.03%	1,198	53.67%	2,232
Hand	1,172	78.45%	290	19.41%	32	2.14%	882	59.04%	1,494
Hanson	1,005	75.06%	280	20.91%	54	4.03%	725	54.14%	1,339
Harding	517	84.75%	47	7.70%	46	7.54%	470	77.05%	610
Hughes	5,668	81.71%	1,113	16.04%	156	2.25%	4,555	65.66%	6,937
Hutchinson	2,215	80.05%	466	16.84%	86	3.11%	1,749	63.21%	2,767
Hyde	479	79.44%	111	18.41%	13	2.16%	368	61.03%	603
Jackson	616	67.99%	233	25.72%	57	6.29%	383	42.27%	906
Jerauld	627	74.64%	197	23.45%	16	1.90%	430	51.19%	840
Jones	390	84.23%	60	12.96%	13	2.81%	330	71.27%	463
Kingsbury	1,480	70.04%	568	26.88%	65	3.08%	912	43.16%	2,113
Lake	3,493	71.72%	1,205	24.74%	172	3.53%	2,288	46.98%	4,870
Lawrence	6,434	72.32%	2,000	22.48%	462	5.19%	4,434	49.84%	8,896
Lincoln	12,768	75.68%	3,513	20.82%	589	3.49%	9,255	54.86%	16,870
Lyman	863	69.77%	318	25.71%	56	4.53%	545	44.06%	1,237
Marshall	760	43.11%	970	55.02%	33	1.87%	-210	-11.91%	1,763
McCook	1,522	73.99%	462	22.46%	73	3.55%	1,060	51.53%	2,057
McPherson	848	82.49%	160	15.56%	20	1.95%	688	66.93%	1,028
Meade	6,503	78.27%	1,373	16.53%	432	5.20%	5,130	61.75%	8,308
Mellette	424	62.26%	224	32.89%	33	4.85%	200	29.37%	681
Miner	621	70.89%	224	25.57%	31	3.54%	397	45.32%	876
Minnehaha	37,228	68.61%	14,716	27.12%	2,320	4.28%	22,512	41.49%	54,264
Moody	1,658	69.29%	638	26.66%	97	4.05%	1,020	42.62%	2,393
Pennington	24,340	72.75%	7,551	22.57%	1,564	4.67%	16,789	50.18%	33,455
Perkins	1,066	80.33%	184	13.87%	77	5.80%	882	66.47%	1,327
Potter	973	83.45%	170	14.58%	23	1.97%	803	68.87%	1,166
Roberts	1,787	55.51%	1,346	41.81%	86	2.67%	441	13.70%	3,219
Sanborn	634	73.29%	203	23.47%	28	3.24%	431	49.83%	865
Shannon	590	22.09%	1,875	70.20%	206	7.71%	-1,285	-48.11%	2,671
Spink	1,812	71.51%	650	25.65%	72	2.84%	1,162	45.86%	2,534
Stanley	1,042	80.65%	208	16.10%	42	3.25%	834	64.55%	1,292
Sully	565	82.97%	96	14.10%	20	2.94%	469	68.87%	681
Todd	658	30.69%	1,354	63.15%	132	6.16%	-696	-32.46%	2,144
Tripp	1,793	81.76%	348	15.87%	52	2.37%	1,445	65.89%	2,193
Turner	2,373	71.97%	713	21.63%	211	6.40%	1,660	50.35%	3,297
Union	3,754	73.59%	1,092	21.41%	255	5.00%	2,662	52.19%	5,101
Walworth	1,493	77.96%	370	19.32%	52	2.72%	1,123	58.64%	1,915
Yankton	5,310	68.75%	2,088	27.03%	326	4.22%	3,222	41.71%	7,724
Ziebach	357	56.85%	238	37.90%	33	5.25%	119	18.95%	628
Totals	195,477	70.47%	70,549	25.43%	11,377	4.10%	124,928	45.03%	277,403

==== Counties that flipped from Democratic to Republican ====
- Clay (largest city: Vermillion)
- Corson (largest city: McLaughlin)
- Day (largest city: Webster)
- Dewey (largest city: North Eagle Butte)
- Roberts (largest city: Sisseton)
- Ziebach (largest city: Dupree)

==== Counties that flipped from Republican to Democratic ====
- Marshall (largest city: Britton)

== See also ==
- 2014 United States Senate elections
- 2014 United States elections
