= Isaac Latterell =

American politician (born 1981)

Member of the South Dakota House of Representatives from the 6th district
- In office January 11, 2013 – January 12, 2021 Serving with Herman Otten
- Preceded by: Burt Tulson
- Succeeded by: Ernie Otten and Aaron Aylward

Personal details
- Born: March 13, 1981 (age 45)
- Party: Republican
- Education: Northern State University
- Website: isaaclatterell.com

Isaac James Latterell (born March 13, 1981) is an American politician and a former Republican member of the South Dakota House of Representatives who has represented District 6 from January 11, 2013 to January 12, 2021. In 2016, he was elected as Majority Whip and served in that position for 2017 and 2018.

== Education ==
Latterell earned his BA in finance from Northern State University.

== Elections ==
- 2012 Redistricted to District 6, and with incumbent Republican Representatives Brock Greenfield and Burt Tulson both redistricted to District 2, Latterell ran in the four-way June 5, 2012 Republican Primary and placed first with 808 votes (35.27%); in the four-way November 6, 2012 General election, fellow Republican nominee Herman Otten took the first seat and Latterell took the second seat with 5,000 votes (31.61%) ahead of Democratic nominees Joseph Weis and Michael Jauron.
- 2010 To challenge District 3 incumbent Democratic Representative Dennis Feickert, Latterell ran in the June 8, 2010 Republican Primary but again lost the four-way November 2, 2010 General election to incumbent Representatives Novstrup and Feickert, who took the first and second seats respectively.
- 2008 When House District 3 incumbent Republican Representative Al Novstrup ran for South Dakota Senate and left a House District 3 seat open, Latterell ran in the June 3, 2008 Republican Primary but lost the four-way November 4, 2008 General election to incumbent Republican Representative David Novstrup, who took the first seat, and Democratic nominee Dennis Feickert, who took the second seat.
- 2006 Latterell challenged Senate District 3 incumbent Republican Senator Duane Sutton in the June 6, 2006 Republican Primary, and won by 17 votes with 613 votes (50.7%), but lost the November 7, 2006 General election to Democratic nominee Alan Hoerth.

== Political positions ==
In February 2015, Latterell on his website criticised the practice of beheading unborn children and compared Planned Parenthood to the Islamic State of Iraq and the Levant.
