= 2026 South Dakota gubernatorial election =

- November 3, 2026
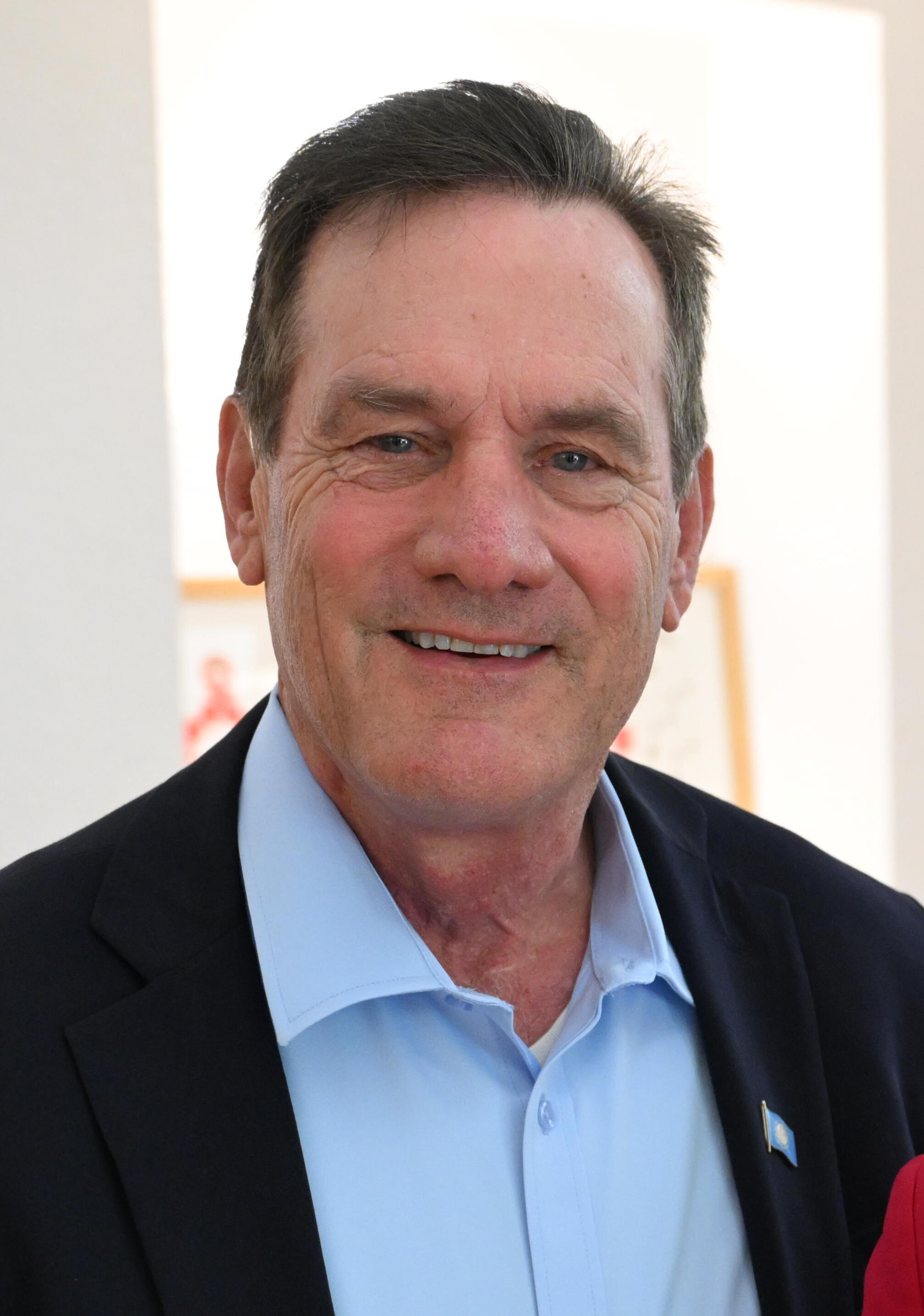

Nominee	Larry Rhoden	Dan Ahlers
Party	Republican	Democratic
Running mate	Tony Venhuizen	Steven McCleerey
Popular vote	193,335	111,161
Percentage	63.49%	36.51%
- County results Rhoden: 50–60% 60–70% 70–80% 80–90% >90% Ahlers: 50–60% 60–70% 70–80% 80–90%
Governor before election
Larry Rhoden
Republican
Elected Governor
Larry Rhoden
Republican

The 2026 South Dakota gubernatorial election took place on November 3, 2026, to elect the governor of South Dakota. The primary elections were held on June 2, 2026, and since no candidate received over 35% in the Republican primary, a runoff election was held on July 28.

Incumbent Republican Larry Rhoden, who ascended to the office of governor in 2025 after Kristi Noem resigned to become secretary of homeland security, won his first full term in office. Rhoden had previously been serving as lieutenant governor under Noem since the two took office in 2019. Democrats have not won a gubernatorial election in South Dakota since 1974 and have not held the office since Harvey Wollman left office in 1979.

== Republican primary ==
=== Candidates ===
==== Nominee ====
- Larry Rhoden, incumbent governor (2025–present)
  - Running mate: Tony Venhuizen, incumbent lieutenant governor (2025–present)

==== Eliminated in runoff ====
- Toby Doeden, retail and real estate executive

==== Eliminated in primary ====
- Jon Hansen, Speaker of the South Dakota House of Representatives (2025–present) from the 25th district (2011–2013, 2019–present)
  - Running mate: Karla Lems, Speaker Pro Tempore of the South Dakota House of Representatives (2025-present) from the 16th district (2023–present)
- Dusty Johnson, U.S. representative from South Dakota's at-large congressional district (2019–present)

==== Declined ====
- Marty Jackley, Attorney General of South Dakota (2009–2019, 2023–present) (ran for U.S. House)
- Mike Rounds, U.S. Senator (2015–present) and former governor (2003–2011) (ran for re-election)
- Paul TenHaken, mayor of Sioux Falls (2018–2026)

=== First round ===
==== Endorsements ====
Toby Doeden

State legislators

- Steve Haugaard, former speaker of the House (2019–2021) from the 10th district (2015–2023) and candidate for this seat in 2022
- Taffy Howard, state senator from the 34th district (2025–present) and former state representative from the 33rd district (2017–2023)
- Phil Jensen, state representative from the 33rd district (2009–2013, 2021–present) and former state senator from the 33rd district (2013–2021)
- Brandei Schaefbauer, state representative from the 3rd district (2023–present)
- Logan Manhart, state representative from the 1st district (2025–present)
- Bobbi Andera, state representative from the 10th district (2025–present)
- John Carley, state senator from the 29th district (2025–present)
Jon Hansen

State legislators

- 26 state senators and representatives
Dusty Johnson

Statewide officials

- Dennis Daugaard, former governor of South Dakota (2011–2019)

State legislators

- 36 state senators and representatives
- 77 former state senators and representatives

Organizations

- South Dakota Fraternal Order of Police
- AIPAC
Larry Rhoden

State legislators

- Mike Derby, state representative from the 34th district (2021–present)
- Arch Beal, state senator from the 12th district (2023–present) and former state representative from the 12th district (2015–2023)
- Amber Hulse, state senator from the 30th district (2025–present)

Organizations

- NRA Political Victory Fund
- Susan B. Anthony Pro-Life America Candidate Fund

==== Debates ====
2026 South Dakota Republican gubernatorial primary debates
No.	Date	Host	Moderator	Link	Republican	Republican	Republican	Republican
Key: P Participant I Invited W Withdrawn A Absent N Not invited								
Key: P Participant I Invited W Withdrawn A Absent N Not invited					Johnson	Doeden	Rhoden	Hansen
1	Mar. 31, 2026	Keloland; Nexstar Media	Dan Santella; Lauren Soulek	KELOLAND	P	P	P	P
2	Apr. 13, 2026	South Dakota Public Broadcasting; South Dakota News Watch	Jackie Hendry; Alexander Rifaat	Youtube	P	P	P	P
3	Apr. 27, 2026	Dakota Scout; Forum Communications	Jonatahan Ellis; Patrick Lalley	Youtube	P	P	P	P

==== Polling ====
Poll source	Date(s) administered	Sample size (Note: Key: A – all adults RV – registered voters LV – likely voters V – unclear)	Margin of error	Toby Doeden	Jon Hansen	Dusty Johnson	Larry Rhoden	Undecided
The Public Sentiment Institute	May 26–27 2026	400 (LV)	± 4.9%	24%	13%	27%	32%	3%
Meeting Street Insights (R) (Note: Poll sponsored by Conservative Agenda for America)	May 18–20, 2026	450 (LV)	± 4.6%	22%	21%	19%	23%	15%
Emerson College (Note: Poll sponsored by KELO-TV and Nexstar Media)	May 18–19, 2026	432 (LV)	± 4.7%	26%	16%	23%	19%	16%
Mason-Dixon Polling & Strategy (Note: Poll sponsored by South Dakota News Watch and the Chiesman Center for Democracy at the University of South Dakota)	April 7–11, 2026	500 (RV)	± 4.5%	17%	18%	34%	17%	14%
Emerson College	March 7–9, 2026	413 (LV)	± 4.8%	18%	14%	28%	17%	23%
Public Opinion Strategies (R) (Note: Poll sponsored by Rhoden's campaign)	March 2–5, 2026	400 (LV)	± 4.9%	16%	10%	33%	28%	12%
Mason-Dixon Polling & Strategy (Note: Poll sponsored by South Dakota News Watch)	October 16–20, 2025	502 (RV)	± 4.5%	15%	10%	28%	27%	21%

Hypothetical polling

Larry Rhoden vs. Dusty Johnson

Poll source	Date(s) administered	Sample size	Margin of error	Larry Rhoden	Dusty Johnson	Undecided
Public Opinion Strategies (R)	March 2–5, 2026	400 (LV)	± 4.9%	48%	39%	13%

Toby Doeden vs. Jon Hansen vs. Marty Jackley vs. Dusty Johnson vs. Larry Rhoden

Poll source	Date(s) administered	Sample size	Margin of error	Toby Doeden	Jon Hansen	Marty Jackley	Dusty Johnson	Larry Rhoden	Undecided
Mason-Dixon Polling & Strategy	April 9–14, 2025	500 (RV)	± 4.5%	4%	2%	18%	28%	27%	20%

Mike Rounds vs. Dusty Johnson

Poll source	Date(s) administered	Sample size	Margin of error	Mike Rounds	Dusty Johnson	Undecided
Kaplan Strategies	June 12, 2023	500 (RV)	± 4.7%	25%	25%	50%

==== Results ====
Primary results by county: Doeden: 20–30%; 30–40%; 40–50%; Rhoden: 20–30%; 30–40%; 40–50%; Johnson: 20–30%; 30–40%; Hansen: 20–30%; 30–40%; 40–50%

As no candidate received 35% of the primary vote, a primary runoff was held between the top two candidates on July 28th, 2026. This was the first runoff ever held in the state since the adoption of a 1985 law that established runoffs for gubernatorial and Congressional primaries.

Republican primary results
Party	Candidate	Votes	%
Republican	Toby Doeden	41,712	30.6
Republican	Larry Rhoden (incumbent)	34,321	25.2
Republican	Dusty Johnson	31,856	23.4
Republican	Jon Hansen	28,341	20.8
Total votes		136,230	100.0

=== Runoff ===
==== Endorsements ====
Toby Doeden

Organizations

- Turning Point Action
Larry Rhoden

Executive branch officials

- Kristi Noem, United States Secretary of Homeland Security (2025–2026)

State legislators

- Scott Odenbach, Majority Leader of the South Dakota House of Representatives (2025–present) from the 31st district (2021–present) (previously endorsed Hansen)
- Taylor Rehfeldt, former Assistant Majority Leader of the South Dakota House of Representatives (2023–2025) from the 14th district (2021–present) (previously endorsed Johnson)

Local officials

- Paul TenHaken, mayor of Sioux Falls (2018–2026)
- Christine Erickson, mayor of Sioux Falls (2026–present)

Organizations

- South Dakota Fraternal Order of Police (previously endorsed Johnson)

==== Polling ====
Poll source	Date(s) administered	Sample size	Margin of error	Toby Doeden	Larry Rhoden	Undecided
Emerson College	July 12–13 2026	500 (LV)	± 4.3%	32%	62%	7%

==== Results ====
Runoff results by county: Rhoden: 50–60%; 60–70%; 70–80%; 80–90%; Doeden: 50–60%

Republican primary runoff results
Party	Candidate	Votes	%
Republican	Larry Rhoden (incumbent)	83,582	70.8
Republican	Toby Doeden	34,430	29.2
Total votes		118,012	100.0

== Democratic primary ==
=== Candidates ===
==== Nominee ====
- Dan Ahlers, executive director of the South Dakota Democratic Party, former state senator (2008–2010), and nominee for U.S. Senate in 2020
  - Running mate: Steven McCleerey, former state representative from the 1st district (2015–2021)

==== Failed to qualify ====
- Robert Arnold, college student

=== Endorsements ===
Dan Ahlers

Executive branch officials

- Joe Biden, 46th president of the United States (2021-2025) (Note: Endorsement received after the first round of primary voting took place.)

== Independents ==
=== Candidates ===
==== Withdrawn ====
- Allison Renville, political organizer and Democratic candidate for South Dakota's 1st legislative district in 2018
- Terry Gleason, web developer and convicted sex offender
- Scott Morris, retired Air Force veteran
- Anthony Sitter, HVAC installer

==== Declined ====
- Rick Knobe, former mayor of Sioux Falls (1974–1984) and candidate for state senate in 2020

== General election ==
=== Predictions ===
Source	Ranking	As of
The Cook Political Report	Solid R	October 29, 2026
Decision Desk HQ	Safe R	November 3, 2026
Fox News	Solid R	November 1, 2026
Inside Elections	Solid R	October 29, 2026
NBC News	Solid R	November 3, 2026
RealClearPolitics	Solid R	November 1, 2026
Sabato's Crystal Ball	Safe R	November 2, 2026
Silver Bulletin	Solid R	November 3, 2026

=== Post-primary endorsements ===
Larry Rhoden (R)

Executive branch officials

- Donald Trump, 45th and 47th president of the United States (2017–2021, 2025–present)

Newspapers

- Mitchell Daily Republic
Dan Ahlers (D)

Labor unions

- AFSCME Council 65

=== Polling ===
Poll source	Date(s) administered	Sample size	Margin of error	Larry Rhoden (R)	Dan Ahlers (D)	Other	Undecided
Mason-Dixon Polling & Strategy (Note: Poll sponsored by South Dakota News Watch & Chiesman Center for Democracy at the University of South Dakota.)	October 12–14, 2026	500 (LV)	± 4.5%	56%	36%	—	8%
Concord Public Opinion Partners (D) (Note: Poll sponsored by Democrats for Education Reform)	October 6–8, 2026	400 (LV)	± 4.9%	48%	38%	4%	10%

=== Results ===
2026 South Dakota gubernatorial election
Party	Candidate	Votes	%	±%
Republican	Larry Rhoden	193,335	63.49	+1.51
Democratic	Dan Ahlers	111,161	36.51	+1.34
Total votes		304,496	100.00	N/A
Republican hold				

==== By county ====
County	Larry Rhoden Republican		Dan Ahlers Democratic		Margin		Total
County	#	%	#	%	#	%	Total
Aurora	746	76.43%	230	23.57%	516	52.87%	976
Beadle	3,397	70.42%	1,427	29.58%	1,970	40.84%	4,824
Bennett	511	61.20%	324	38.80%	187	22.40%	835
Bon Homme	1,610	75.02%	536	24.98%	1,074	50.05%	2,146
Brookings	6,825	59.32%	4,681	40.68%	2,144	18.63%	11,506
Brown	7,690	63.83%	4,358	36.17%	3,332	27.66%	12,048
Brule	1,267	71.42%	507	28.58%	760	42.84%	1,774
Buffalo	138	36.41%	241	63.59%	-103	-27.18%	379
Butte	2,745	79.89%	691	20.11%	2,054	59.78%	3,436
Campbell	521	86.69%	80	13.31%	441	73.38%	601
Charles Mix	1,913	71.25%	772	28.75%	1,141	42.50%	2,685
Clark	1,232	80.31%	302	19.69%	930	60.63%	1,534
Clay	1,839	44.99%	2,249	55.01%	-410	-10.03%	4,088
Codington	6,774	68.45%	3,122	31.55%	3,652	36.90%	9,896
Corson	409	56.34%	317	43.66%	92	12.67%	726
Custer	3,421	73.66%	1,223	26.34%	2,198	47.33%	4,644
Davison	4,134	68.14%	1,933	31.86%	2,201	36.28%	6,067
Day	1,467	64.57%	805	35.43%	662	29.14%	2,272
Deuel	1,253	74.23%	435	25.77%	818	48.46%	1,688
Dewey	593	46.15%	692	53.85%	-99	-7.70%	1,285
Douglas	1,119	88.88%	140	11.12%	979	77.76%	1,259
Edmunds	1,143	79.38%	297	20.63%	846	58.75%	1,440
Fall River	2,420	74.21%	841	25.79%	1,579	48.42%	3,261
Faulk	695	84.34%	129	15.66%	566	68.69%	824
Grant	2,109	72.70%	792	27.30%	1,317	45.40%	2,901
Gregory	1,247	79.12%	329	20.88%	918	58.25%	1,576
Haakon	752	89.84%	85	10.16%	667	79.69%	837
Hamlin	1,756	78.50%	481	21.50%	1,275	57.00%	2,237
Hand	1,056	82.95%	217	17.05%	839	65.91%	1,273
Hanson	895	78.92%	239	21.08%	656	57.85%	1,134
Harding	630	95.02%	33	4.98%	597	90.05%	663
Hughes	4,485	68.80%	2,034	31.20%	2,451	37.60%	6,519
Hutchinson	2,040	79.78%	517	20.22%	1,523	59.56%	2,557
Hyde	418	82.94%	86	17.06%	332	65.87%	504
Jackson	540	69.68%	235	30.32%	305	39.35%	775
Jerauld	535	76.54%	164	23.46%	371	53.08%	699
Jones	405	89.21%	49	10.79%	356	78.41%	454
Kingsbury	1,490	72.44%	567	27.56%	923	44.87%	2,057
Lake	2,922	65.72%	1,524	34.28%	1,398	31.44%	4,446
Lawrence	6,994	66.09%	3,589	33.91%	3,405	32.17%	10,583
Lincoln	16,018	60.88%	10,292	39.12%	5,726	21.76%	26,310
Lyman	781	69.48%	343	30.52%	438	38.97%	1,124
Marshall	1,056	63.73%	601	36.27%	455	27.46%	1,657
McCook	1,562	71.88%	611	28.12%	951	43.76%	2,173
McPherson	861	86.27%	137	13.73%	724	72.55%	998
Meade	7,535	75.12%	2,495	24.88%	5,040	50.25%	10,030
Mellette	403	65.85%	209	34.15%	194	31.70%	612
Miner	662	73.39%	240	26.61%	422	46.78%	902
Minnehaha	34,945	52.58%	31,521	47.42%	3,424	5.15%	66,466
Moody	1,496	60.44%	979	39.56%	517	20.89%	2,475
Oglala Lakota	317	14.29%	1,901	85.71%	-1,584	-71.42%	2,218
Pennington	23,367	62.77%	13,861	37.23%	9,506	25.53%	37,228
Perkins	1,102	86.64%	170	13.36%	932	73.27%	1,272
Potter	787	84.81%	141	15.19%	646	69.61%	928
Roberts	1,756	59.08%	1,216	40.92%	540	18.17%	2,972
Sanborn	602	72.44%	229	27.56%	373	44.89%	831
Spink	1,632	71.86%	639	28.14%	993	43.73%	2,271
Stanley	1,020	76.58%	312	23.42%	708	53.15%	1,332
Sully	597	83.85%	115	16.15%	482	67.70%	712
Todd	399	24.28%	1,244	75.72%	-845	-51.43%	1,643
Tripp	1,600	82.56%	338	17.44%	1,262	65.12%	1,938
Turner	2,418	74.38%	833	25.62%	1,585	48.75%	3,251
Union	3,894	66.98%	1,920	33.02%	1,974	33.95%	5,814
Walworth	1,329	80.64%	319	19.36%	1,010	61.29%	1,648
Yankton	4,738	61.49%	2,967	38.51%	1,771	22.99%	7,705
Ziebach	322	55.81%	255	44.19%	67	11.61%	577
Totals	193,335	63.49%	111,161	36.51%	82,174	26.99%	304,496

== Notes ==
Partisan clients

== See also ==
- 2026 United States gubernatorial elections
