= South Dakota's 1st legislative district =

American legislative district

South Dakota's 1st State Senate district

South Dakota's 1st legislative district is one of 35 districts in the South Dakota Legislature. Each district is represented by 1 senator and 2 representatives. In the Senate, It has been represented by Republican Michael Rohl since 2021, and in the House, it has been represented by Republicans Joe Donnell since 2023 and Tamara St. John since 2019.

== Geography ==
The district is located in Northeastern South Dakota. It contains Brown, Day, Marshall and Roberts County. Its largest city is Sisseton.

== Recent election results ==
South Dakota legislators are elected to two-year terms, with each permitted to serve a maximum of four consecutive two-year terms. Elections are held every even-numbered year.

=== State senate elections ===
Year	Incumbent	Party	First elected	Result	General election	Primary elections
2022	Michael Rohl	Republican	2020	Incumbent re-elected.	▌ ✓ Michael Rohl (Republican) 58.9%; ▌Susan Wismer (Independent) 41.1%	Republican: ▌ ✓ Michael Rohl 70.5%; ▌Joe Donnell 29.5%
2020	Susan Wismer	Democratic	2018	Incumbent defeated. Republican gain.	▌ ✓ Michael Rohl (Republican) 55.2%; ▌Susan Wismer (Democratic) 44.8%	
2018	Jason Frerichs	Democratic	2010	Incumbent retired. Democratic hold.	▌ ✓ Susan Wismer (Democratic) 100%	Democratic: ▌ ✓ Susan Wismer 69.9%; ▌ Thomas Bisek 15.7%; ▌ Allison Renville 14.4%
2016	Jason Frerichs	Democratic	2010	Incumbent re-elected.	▌ ✓ Jason Frerichs (Democratic) 100%	
2014	Jason Frerichs	Democratic	2010	Incumbent re-elected.	▌ ✓ Jason Frerichs (Democratic) 100%	
2012	Jason Frerichs	Democratic	2010	Incumbent re-elected.	▌ ✓ Jason Frerichs (Democratic) 100%	

=== State house elections ===
In 33 of the 35 legislative districts, both representatives are elected at-large. The top two candidates in each party's primaries will be their respective party's nominees for the general election.

Year	Incumbents	Party	First elected	Result	General election	Primary elections
2022	▌Tamara St. John ▌Jennifer Healy Keintz	Republican; Democratic	2018; 2020	Incumbent re-elected. Incumbent lost nomination. Republican gain.	▌ ✓ Tamara St. John (Republican) 31.8%; ▌ ✓ Joe Donnell (Republican) 28.5%; ▌Steven McCleerey (Democratic) 22.0%; ▌Kay Nikolas (Democratic) 17.7%	
2020	▌Tamara St. John ▌Steven McCleerey	Republican; Democratic	2018; 2014	Incumbent re-elected. Incumbent lost re-election. Mixed hold.	▌ ✓ Tamara St. John (Republican) 41.3%; ▌ ✓ Jennifer Healy Keintz (Democratic) 30.2%; ▌ Steven McCleerey (Democratic) 28.5%	
2018	▌Steven McCleerey ▌Susan Wismer	Democratic	2014; 2016	Incumbent re-elected. Incumbent retired. Republican gain.	▌ ✓ Tamara St. John (Republican) 35.9%; ▌ ✓ Steven McCleerey (Democratic) 32.6%; ▌ H. Paul Dennert (Democratic) 31.4%	Democratic: ▌ ✓ Steven McCleerey 38.7%; ▌ ✓ H. Paul Dennert (Democratic) 33.8%; ▌ Robert Whitmyre (Democratic) 27.4%
2016	▌Dennis Feickert ▌Steven McCleerey	Democratic	2008; 2014	Incumbent retired. Incumbent re-elected. Democratic hold.	▌ ✓ Susan Wismer (Democratic); ▌ ✓ Steven McCleerey (Democratic)	
2014	▌Dennis Feickert ▌Susan Wismer	Democratic	2008	Incumbent re-elected. Incumbent retired. Democratic hold.	▌ ✓ Dennis Feickert (Democratic); ▌ ✓ Steven McCleerey (Democratic)	Democratic: ▌ ✓ Dennis Feickert 42.5%; ▌ ✓ Steven McCleerey 35.1%; ▌ Dustina Gill 22.4%
2012	▌Dennis Feickert ▌Susan Wismer	Democratic	2008	Incumbents re-elected.	▌ ✓ Dennis Feickert (Democratic); ▌ ✓ Susan Wismer (Democratic)	
