= Brock Greenfield =

American politician (born 1975)

School and Public Lands Commissioner of South Dakota
- Incumbent
- Assumed office January 7, 2023
- Governor: Kristi Noem; Larry Rhoden
- Preceded by: Jarrod Johnson

President pro tempore of the South Dakota Senate
- In office January 10, 2017 – January 8, 2021
- Preceded by: Corey Brown
- Succeeded by: Lee Schoenbeck

Member of the South Dakota Senate from the 2nd district
- In office January 10, 2015 – January 7, 2023
- Preceded by: Chuck Welke
- Succeeded by: Steve Kolbeck

Member of the South Dakota House of Representatives from the 2nd district
- In office January 2013 – January 10, 2015
- Preceded by: Paul Dennert
- Succeeded by: Lana Greenfield

Member of the South Dakota House of Representatives from the 6th district
- In office January 2009 – January 10, 2013
- Preceded by: Paul Nelson
- Succeeded by: Herman Otten

Member of the South Dakota Senate from the 6th district
- In office January 2001 – January 2009
- Preceded by: Randall Frederick
- Succeeded by: Art Fryslie

Personal details
- Born: October 5, 1975 (age 50) Watertown, South Dakota, U.S.
- Party: Republican
- Education: Northern State University (BS)

Brock L. Greenfield (born October 5, 1975 in Watertown, South Dakota) is an American politician serving as School and Public Lands Commissioner of South Dakota. He previously served as a Republican member of the South Dakota Senate. Greenfield was consecutively a member of the House for District 6 from January 2009 until January 11, 2013, and a member of the South Dakota Senate for District 6 from January 2001 until January 2009. Greenfield has represented District 2 since January 10, 2015.

== Early life ==
Brock was born to Don and Lana Greenfield. His parents have backgrounds in teaching and in owning a business. Brock also has two siblings: a brother, Blake, and a sister, Laci. Brock played basketball and baseball while in school. Greenfield graduated from Doland High School in 1994 and earned his BS in 1999 from Northern State University. Since January 2015 Brock and his mother, Lana, have served in the SD Legislature as the only Mother/Son to ever serve simultaneously. Brock is in the Senate, and Lana is in the House, both representing District 2.

== Elections ==
=== South Dakota State Senate ===
- 2000 When incumbent Republican Senator Randall Frederick left the Legislature and left the Senate District 6 seat open, Greenfield was unopposed for the June 6, 2000 Republican Primary and won the November 7, 2000 General election with 5,016 votes (51.1%) against Democratic Representative Doug Kazmerzak. in winning the seat, Greenfield became the youngest Senator in South Dakota history, a distinction he still holds.
- 2002 Greenfield was unopposed for the June 4, 2002 Republican Primary and won the November 5, 2002 General election with 5,731 votes (55.8%) against Democratic Representative Charlie Flowers.
- 2004 Greenfield was unopposed for the June 1, 2004 Republican Primary and won the November 2, 2004 General election with 7,268 votes (69.1%) against Democratic nominee Ronald Larson.
- 2006 Greenfield was challenged by Representative James Holbeck in the June 6, 2006 Republican Primary; Greenfield placed first with 1,769 votes (70.8%); and won the November 7, 2006 General election with 5,515 votes (60.6%) against Democratic nominee Ron Foster who had run for a House seat in 2004.

=== South Dakota State House of Representatives ===
- 2008 Term limited from remaining in the Senate, and with House District 6 incumbent Republican Representative Paul Nelson leaving the Legislature and leaving a House District 6 seat open, Greenfield ran, along with incumbent Kristi Noem, and the two were successful in winning House seats.
- 2010 When incumbent Republican Representative Kristi Noem ran for United States House of Representatives and left a District 6 seat open, Greenfield and Burt Tulson were unopposed for both the June 8, 2010 Republican Primary and the November 2, 2010 General election where Greenfield took the first seat with 4,991 votes (53.49%) and Tulson took the second seat.
- 2012 Redistricted to District 2 with Republican Burt Tulson, and with incumbent Democratic Representatives Paul Dennert running for South Dakota Senate and Elaine Elliot leaving the Legislature leaving both District 2 seats open, Greenfield and Representative Tulson were unopposed for the June 5, 2012 Republican Primary; in the four-way November 6, 2012 General election Greenfield took the first seat with 6,049 votes (33.5%) and Representative Tulson took the second seat ahead of Democratic nominees Dennis Nemmers (who had run for a legislative seat in 2008 before withdrawing) and Danny Miles.

=== South Dakota State Senate ===
- 2014 Greenfield challenged Democrat Sen. Chuck Welke and defeated him in the general election 4,584 to 4,136.
- 2016 Greenfield ran unopposed and received 7,839 votes in the general election.
- 2018 Greenfield defeated Democrat Paul Register by a margin of 6,574 to 3,207.
- 2020 Greenfield was uncontested in his re-election bid and received 8,154 votes.

== Controversy ==
=== Admonishment by State Senate ===
On March 30, 2020, during a late night session of the legislature Senator Kris Langer was accused by fellow State Senator Phil Jensen of being intoxicated at the Capitol, later Greenfield was also accused of being intoxicated. On April 23, 2020, a bipartisan committee established to look into the allegations against Langer and Greenfield, voted 9–0 to admonish both of Langer and Greenfield for their conduct. During the hearing Greenfield made the following statement: "I would echo the sentiments shared by Senator Langer. I too apologize. I am truly sorry for even placing myself in a setting that allowed for questions as to my judgment or my state of mind. Moreover, I am sorry for the time and energy that so many people have spent dealing with this matter. Especially in these current times, there is important work to do for the people of South Dakota and I am hopeful that we can all focus moving forward."

== Campaign for Commissioner of School and Public Lands ==
In 2021, Greenfield announced that he was running for the office of the Commissioner of School and Public Lands.

South Dakota Senate
Preceded by Corey Brown	President pro tempore of the South Dakota Senate; 2017–2021	Succeeded by Lee Schoenbeck
Party political offices
Preceded by Ryan Brunner	Republican nominee for School and Public Lands Commissioner of South Dakota; 2022	Most recent
Political offices
Preceded by Jarrod Johnson	School and Public Lands Commissioner of South Dakota; 2023–present	Incumbent
