= South Dakota's 6th legislative district =

American legislative district

South Dakota's 6th State Senate district

South Dakota's 6th legislative district is one of 35 districts in the South Dakota Legislature. Each district is represented by 1 senator and 2 representatives. In the Senate, it has been represented by Republican Ernie Otten Jr. since 2025. In the House, it is represented by Republicans Aaron Aylward and Herman Otten.

== Geography ==
The district is located in the southern suburbs of Sioux Falls entirely within Lincoln County, in southeastern South Dakota. Its largest city is Harrisburg.

== Recent elections ==
South Dakota legislators are elected to two-year terms, with each permitted to serve a maximum of four consecutive two-year terms. Elections are held every even-numbered year.

=== State senate elections ===
Year	Incumbent	Party	First elected	Result	General election	Primary elections
2024	Ernie Otten Jr.	Republican	2024	Incumbent retired. Republican hold.	▌ ✓ Ernie Otten Jr. (Republican) 100%	Republican: ▌ ✓ Aaron Aylward 61.3%; ▌ ✓ Herman Otten 61.3%; ▌ Larry Tidemann - 38.7%
2022	Herman Otten	Republican	2020	Incumbent re-elected.	▌ ✓ Herman Otten (Republican) 100%	
2020	Herman Otten	Republican	2012	Incumbent retired. Republican hold.	▌ ✓ Herman Otten (Republican) 66.7%; ▌ Nancy Kirstein (Democratic) 33.3%	Republican: ▌ ✓ Herman Otten 61.3%; ▌ Larry Tidemann - 38.7%
2018	Ernie Otten Jr.	Republican	2012	Incumbent re-elected.	▌ ✓ Ernie Otten Jr. (Republican) 65.1%; ▌ Teresa Ann Robbins (Democratic) 34.9%	
2016	Ernie Otten Jr.	Republican	2012	Incumbent re-elected.	▌ ✓ Ernie Otten Jr. (Republican) 68.9%; ▌ Kyle Boese (Democratic) 31.1%	
2014	Ernie Otten Jr.	Republican	2012	Incumbent re-elected.	▌ ✓ Ernie Otten Jr. (Republican) 71.8%; ▌ Mel Zelmer (Democratic) 28.2%	
2012	Art Fryslie	Republican	2008	Incumbent re-elected.	▌ ✓ Ernie Otten Jr. (Republican) 65.4%; ▌ Richard Schriever (Democratic) 34.6%	Republican: ▌ ✓ Ernie Otten Jr. 58.9%; ▌ Gene Abdallah - 41.1%

=== State House of Representatives elections ===
Year	Incumbent	Party	Result	General election	Primary elections
2024	Herman Otten (Seat 1); Aaron Aylward (Seat 2)	Republican	Republican hold.	▌ ✓ Herman Otten (Republican) 41.7%; ▌ ✓ Aaron Aylward (Republican) 37.8%; ▌ Garret Campbell (Democratic) 20.5	Republican: ▌ ✓ Aaron Aylward 40%; ▌ ✓ Herman Otten 33%; ▌ Wendi Hogan - 27%
2022	Ernie Otten Jr. (Seat 1); Aaron Aylward (Seat 2)	Republican	Republican hold.	▌ ✓ Ernie Otten Jr. (Republican) 59.9%; ▌ ✓ Aaron Aylward (Republican) 40.1%	
2020	Ernie Otten Jr. (Seat 1); Aaron Aylward (Seat 2)	Republican	Republican hold.	▌ ✓ Ernie Otten Jr. (Republican) 45.1%; ▌ ✓ Aaron Aylward (Republican) 30.8%; ▌ Cody Ingle (Democratic) 24.1%	Republican: ▌ ✓ Ernie Otten Jr. (Republican) 37.9%; ▌ ✓ Aaron Aylward (Republican) 26.8%; ▌ Nathan Block (Republican) 26%; ▌ Thomas Werner (Republican) 9.4%
2018	Herman Otten (Seat 1); Isaac Latterell (Seat 2)	Republican	Republican hold.	▌ ✓ Herman Otten (Republican) 31%; ▌ ✓ Isaac Latterell (Republican) 28.8%; ▌ Nancy Kirstein (Democratic) 17.8%; ▌ Kyle Boese (Democratic) 17.6%; ▌ Aaron Aylward (Libertarian) 4.9%	
2016	Herman Otten (Seat 1); Isaac Latterell (Seat 2)	Republican	Republican hold.	▌ ✓ Herman Otten (Republican) 35.5%; ▌ ✓ Isaac Latterell (Republican) 32.4%; ▌ Clara Hart (Democratic) 17.8%; ▌ Kyle Rogers (Democratic) 14.3%	
2014	Herman Otten (Seat 1); Isaac Latterell (Seat 2)	Republican	Republican hold.	▌ ✓ Herman Otten (Republican) 45.7%; ▌ ✓ Isaac Latterell (Republican) 33.9%; ▌ Richard Schriever (Democratic) 20.4%	
2012	Herman Otten (Seat 1); Isaac Latterell (Seat 2)	Republican	Republican hold.	▌ ✓ Herman Otten (Republican) 36.3%; ▌ ✓ Isaac Latterell (Republican) 31.6%; ▌ Joseph Weis (Democratic) 18.2%; ▌ Michael Jauron (Democratic) 13.9%	
