= Chuck Welke =

American politician (1953–2021)

Member of the South Dakota Senate from the 2nd district
- In office January 8, 2013 – January 13, 2015
- Preceded by: Jim Hundstad
- Succeeded by: Brock Greenfield

Personal details
- Born: Charles Burl Welke; May 27, 1953 Redfield, South Dakota, United States
- Died: May 11, 2021 (aged 67) Sioux Falls, South Dakota, United States
- Party: Democratic
- Spouse: Ellen Byrant Welke
- Children: 3

Charles Burl "Chuck" Welke (/ˈwɛlki/ WEL-kee; May 27, 1953 – May 11, 2021) was an American politician and who served as a Democratic member of the South Dakota Senate representing District 2 from 2013 to 2015.

== Biography ==
Charles Burl Welke was born in Redfield, South Dakota and graduated from Redfield High School in 1971. He received his bachelor of science degree in secondary education and his master's degree in secondary administration from Northern State University in Aberdeen, South Dakota. He taught at the high school in Harrold, South Dakota until 1977 and then taught at the high school in Warner, South Dakota. Welke retired in 2021 and was a substitute teacher.

== Elections ==
- 2012 When incumbent District 2 Republican Senator Jim Hundstad was term limited and left the Legislature, Welke was unopposed for the June 5, 2012 Democratic Primary and won the November 6, 2012 General election with 5,441 votes (51.4%) against incumbent Republican Senator Art Fryslie, who had been redistricted from District 6.

== Death ==
He died after a heart attack at the Avera Heart Hospital in Sioux Falls, South Dakota, on May 11, 2021, at age 67.
