= Senator Novstrup =

Senator Novstrup may refer to:

- Al Novstrup (born 1954), South Dakota State Senate
- David Novstrup (born 1983), South Dakota State Senate
