= Senator Otten =

Senator Otten may refer to:

- Ernie Otten (born 1954), South Dakota State Senate
- Herman Otten (born 1966), South Dakota State Senate
