= South Dakota's 3rd legislative district =

American legislative district

South Dakota's 3rd State Senate district

South Dakota's 3rd legislative district is one of 35 districts in the South Dakota Legislature. Each district is represented by 1 senator and 2 representatives. In the Senate, it has been represented by Republican Carl E. Perry since 2025. In the House, it has been represented by Al Novstrup since 2025 and Brandei Schaefbauer since 2023.

== Geography ==
The district is located in northeastern South Dakota, in Brown County. The district is based in Aberdeen.

== Recent election results ==
South Dakota legislators are elected to two-year terms, with each permitted to serve a maximum of four consecutive two-year terms. Elections are held every even-numbered year.

=== State senate elections ===
Year	Incumbent	Party	First elected	Result	General election	Primary elections
2024	Al Novstrup	Republican	2008	Incumbent term-limited. Republican hold.	▌ ✓ Carl E. Perry (Republican) 100%	
2022	Al Novstrup	Republican	2008	Incumbent re-elected.	▌ ✓ Al Novstrup (Republican) 100%	Republican: ▌ ✓ Al Novstrup (inc.) 59.5%; ▌ Rachel Dix 40.5%
2020	Al Novstrup	Republican	2008	Incumbent re-elected.	▌ ✓ Al Novstrup (Republican) 100%	
2018	Al Novstrup	Republican	2008	Incumbent re-elected.	▌ ✓ Al Novstrup (Republican) 58.5%; ▌ Cory Heidelberger (Democratic) 41.5%	
2016	David Novstrup	Republican	2014	Incumbent retired. Republican hold.	▌ ✓ Al Novstrup (Republican) 61.2%; ▌ Cory Heidelberger (Democratic) 38.8%	
2014	Al Novstrup	Republican	2008	Incumbent retired. Republican hold.	▌ ✓ David Novstrup (Republican) 53.1%; ▌ Mark Remily (Democratic) 46.9%	Democratic: ▌ ✓ Mark Remily 51.0%; ▌ Angela Schultz 49.0%
2012	Al Novstrup	Republican	2008	Incumbent re-elected.	▌ ✓ Al Novstrup (Republican) 53.6%; ▌ H. Paul Dennert (Democratic) 46.4%	
