= Senator Sutton =

Senator Sutton may refer to:

- Billie Sutton (born 1984), South Dakota Senate
- Dan Sutton (born 1970), South Dakota Senate
- Duane Sutton (born 1954), South Dakota State Senate
- Ed Sutton (South Carolina politician) (fl. 2020s), South Carolina State Senate
- Elliot M. Sutton (1841–1908), Vermont State Senate
- Frank Sutton (politician) (1930–2020), Georgia State Senate
- Margaret Sutton (politician) (fl. 2010s–2020s), South Dakota State Senate
- Sam Sutton (politician) (born 1949), New York State Senate
- W. J. Sutton (1865–1940), Washington State Senate
