= Fryslie =

Fryslie is a surname. Notable people with the surname include:

- Anton Fryslie (1859–1935), American politician
- Art Fryslie (1941–2024), American politician
