= Dennert =

Dennert is a surname. Notable people with the surname include:

- Drew Dennert (born 1995), American politician
- Herbert Dennert, researcher and publisher of information displayed on Dennert Fir Trees
- Paul Dennert (born 1937), American politician
- Pauline Dennert (1926–2012), American baseball player
