= Daniel Kaiser =

Daniel Kaiser may refer to:

- Dan Kaiser (politician) (born 1980), American politician
- Daniel Kaiser (footballer, born 1990), German footballer
- Daniel Kaiser (soccer, born 2000), Canadian soccer player
- Daniel Kaiser (wrestler) (fl. 1920s), Swiss wrestler
