= Richard Belatti =

American politician

Member of the South Dakota House of Representatives from the 8th district
- In office January 10, 1995 – January 12, 1999
- Succeeded by: Dale Slaughter; Dan Sutton

Member of the South Dakota Senate from the 13th district
- In office January 10, 1989 – January 12, 1993

Personal details
- Born: January 20, 1928 Watertown, South Dakota
- Died: October 23, 2023 (aged 95) Madison, South Dakota
- Party: Republican

Richard Belatti (January 20, 1928 – October 23, 2023) was an American politician who served in the South Dakota Senate from the 13th district from 1989 to 1993 and in the South Dakota House of Representatives from the 8th district from 1995 to 1999.

He died on October 23, 2023, in Madison, South Dakota at age 95.
