= Northern State Teachers College =

Northern State Teachers College may refer to:

- Northern Michigan University, a public university in Marquette, Michigan
- Northern State University, a public university in Aberdeen, South Dakota
