= Logan Manhart =

American politician (born 1998)

Member of the South Dakota House of Representatives from the 1st district
- Incumbent
- Assumed office January 14, 2025 Serving with Christopher Reder
- Preceded by: Joe Donnell; Tamara St. John

Personal details
- Born: July 1, 1998 (age 28)
- Party: Republican

Logan Manhart (born July 1, 1998) is an American politician. A member of the Republican Party, he was elected to the South Dakota House of Representatives for the 1st district in 2024. He previously ran in the 2022 election until withdrawing following allegations by Steven McCleerey that his recent residency in Wisconsin violated South Dakota's two-year residency requirement for legislative candidates. In July 2025, he made a post to his instagram account stating, “It’s white boy summer and the boys are back in charge". He later deleted the post.
