= Feickert =

Feickert is a surname of German origin. Notable people with the surname include:

- Dennis Feickert (born 1948), American politician
- Lillian Feickert (1877–1945), American suffragette, political organizer, and political candidate
