= Carl E. Perry =

American politician

Member of the South Dakota Senate from the 3rd district
- Incumbent
- Assumed office January 14, 2025
- Preceded by: Al Novstrup
- Succeeded by: Katherine Washnok (elect)

Member of the South Dakota House of Representatives from the 3rd district
- In office 2019 – January 14, 2025 Serving with Drew Dennert (2019-2023); Brandei Schaefbauer (2023-2025)

Personal details
- Party: Republican
- Spouse: Sheryl Perry
- Children: 2
- Education: Northern State University
- Website: carlperry.org

Carl E. Perry is an American politician in the South Dakota Senate. He served in the South Dakota House of Representatives.

Perry has been serving in the South Dakota House of Representatives since 2019. He attended Northern State University from 1971 to 1973.

== Election history ==
- 2020 Dennert was re-elected with 7,108 votes; Carl Perry was also re-elected with 6,087 votes and Leslie McLaughlin received 3,843 votes and Justin Roemmick received 3,720 votes.
- 2018. Incumbent Representative Dan Kaiser did not run for re-election leaving one seat open. Representative Drew Dennert ran for re-election alongside Republican Carl Perry, Democrat Brooks Briscoe and Democrat Justin Roemmick. Dennert and Perry won the two seats earning 32% and 29% respectively, Briscoe and Roemmick finished in 3rd and 4th with 21% and 18%.
