= Welke =

Welke is a surname. Notable people with the surname include:

- Bill Welke (born 1967), American baseball umpire
- Chuck Welke (1953-2021), American educator and politician
- Oliver Welke (born 1966), German television presenter and comedian
- Tim Welke (born 1957), American baseball umpire

== See also ==
- Welke Airport, Michigan, United States
