= Katherine Washnok =

American politician

Member-elect of the South Dakota Senate from the 3rd district
- Assuming office January 2027
- Succeeding: Carl E. Perry

Personal details
- Party: Republican

Katherine Washnok is an American politician. A member of the Republican Party, she is the member-elect for the 3rd district of the South Dakota Senate.
