= 2026 South Dakota Commissioner of School and Public Lands election =

- November 3, 2026
Nominee	Brock Greenfield	Raeann Mettler
Party	Republican	Democratic
Popular vote	179,728	111,002
Percentage	61.8%	38.2%
- County results Greenfield: 50–60% 60–70% 70–80% 80–90% >90% Mettler: 50–60% 60–70% 70–80% 80–90%
Commissioner of School and Public Lands before election
Brock Greenfield
Republican
Elected Commissioner of School and Public Lands
Brock Greenfield
Republican

The 2026 South Dakota Commissioner of School and Public Lands election was held on November 3, 2026, to elect the commissioner of school and public lands of South Dakota. Incumbent Republican Brock Greenfield was reelected to a second term, defeating Democratic challenger Raeann Mettler.

Both candidates were nominated at their respective state party conventions; with Mettler being unchallenged and Greenfield being contested by James Bialota Jr.

== Republican convention ==
=== Candidates ===
==== Nominee ====
- Brock Greenfield, incumbent commissioner of school and public lands

==== Eliminated at convention ====
- James Bialota Jr., small business owner and real estate investor

== Democratic convention ==
=== Candidates ===
==== Nominee ====
- Raeann Mettler, science specialist
