= Stella Gilman =

Author b. 1868

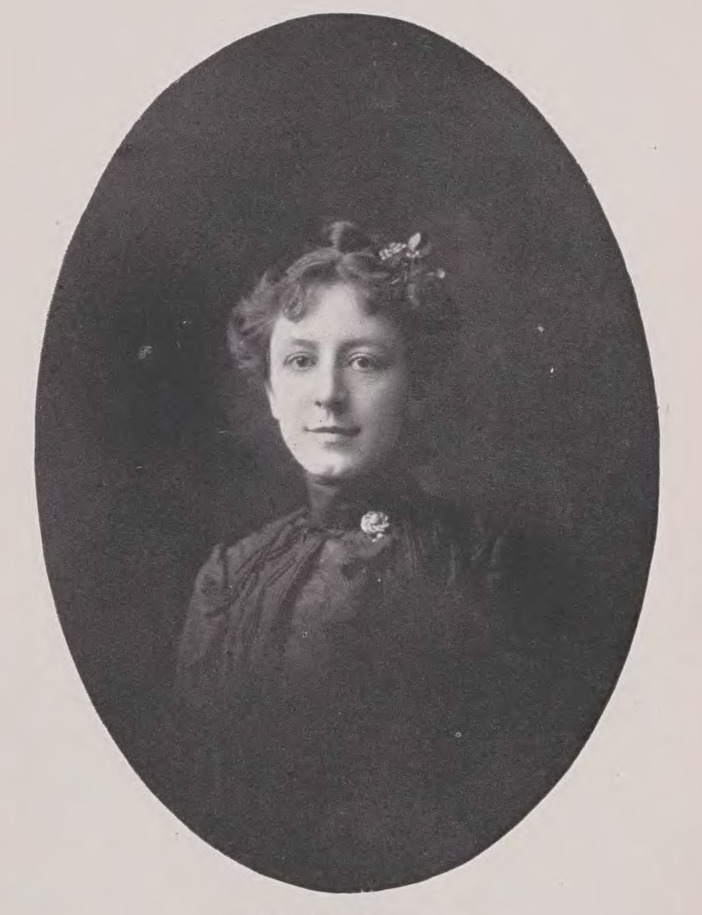
- Born: 1868; Philadelphia
- Died: 1949 (aged 80–81); Norwalk
- Occupation: Writer

Stella Gilman (1868–1949) was an American novelist, one of the first in South Dakota.

== Early life and family ==
Gilman was born Stella Lucille Pigott in 1868 in Philadelphia, the daughter of William Pigott, a clerk in the Frankford Arsenal, and Isabella Catherine Miller Piggott. William Pigott died in 1874 and Isabella Piggott remarried Frazer Gilman, half-brother of A&P founder George Francis Gilman. In 1878 the Gilmans and their children relocated to the Dakota Territory. Frazer Gilman was an founding settler of Eden, South Dakota and operated a ranch near Hudson, South Dakota.

== Education and migration ==
Stella Pigott took the name Stella Gilman. She graduated as valedictorian of Bennett Seminary in Minneapolis, Minnesota in 1888. After her mother's death in 1890, she accompanied her stepfather east. They lived on a Georgia farm and in Brooklyn, finally settling in Norwalk, Connecticut, where he died in 1931 and she died in 1949.

== Books ==
Gilman published two books: That Dakota Girl (1892), a novel, and A Gumbo Lily and Other Tales (1901), a collection of short stories. Nina Baym writes that Gilman's work highlights "the western American female ideal: innate gentility and high-mindedness combines with courage, frankness, and athleticism." In That Dakota Girl, it is exemplified by the oddly named Nitelle M'Jarrowe, who is well educated and speaks French, but is also an accomplished rider who is able to fell two birds with a single shot.
