= Dan Kaiser (politician) =

American politician (born 1980)

Member of the South Dakota House of Representatives from the 3rd district
- Incumbent
- Assumed office January 11, 2013 Serving with Drew Dennert
- Preceded by: Dennis Feickert

Personal details
- Born: December 31, 1980 (age 45) Saint Paul, Minnesota
- Party: Republican
- Spouse: Laura Kaiser
- Children: 2
- Profession: Police officer
- Website: kaiserforhouse.com

Military service
- Branch/service: United States Army Reserve
- Years of service: 1999–2006
- Rank: Sergeant

Daniel M. Kaiser (born December 31, 1980, in Saint Paul, Minnesota) is an American politician and a Republican member of the South Dakota House of Representatives representing District 3 since January 11, 2013.

== Elections ==
- 2012 Redistricted to District 3, and with incumbent Democratic Representative Dennis Feickert redistricted to District 1, Kaiser ran in the June 5, 2012, Republican Primary; in the four-way November 6, 2012, General election, incumbent Republican Representative David Novstrup took the first seat and Kaiser took the second seat with 5,201 votes (27.78%) ahead of Democratic nominees Bill Antonides and Zachary Anderson.
- 2008 To challenge incumbent District 2 Democratic Representatives Paul Dennert and Elaine Elliott, Kaiser ran in the June 3, 2008, Republican Primary but lost the four-way November 4, 2008, General election to incumbent Representatives Dennert and Elliott, who took the first and second seats respectively.
