= Duane Sutton =

American politician (born 1954)

Member of the South Dakota Senate from the 3rd district
- In office January 14, 2003 – January 9, 2007
- Preceded by: Elmer Diedtrich
- Succeeded by: Alan Hoerth

Member of the South Dakota House of Representatives from the 2nd district
- In office January 12, 1999 – January 14, 2003
- Preceded by: Jim Sperry
- Succeeded by: Burt Elliott

Personal details
- Born: February 21, 1954 (age 72) Watertown, South Dakota
- Party: Republican

Duane Sutton (born February 21, 1954) is an American politician who served in the South Dakota House of Representatives from the 2nd district from 1999 to 2003 and in the South Dakota Senate from the 3rd district from 2003 to 2007.
