= Anton Fryslie =

American politician

Anton Fryslie (June 29, 1859 – February 29, 1935) was a member of the South Dakota House of Representatives.

== Biography ==
Fryslie was born on June 29, 1859, in Jordan, Wisconsin. He was married to Mary Glisne.

== Career ==
Fryslie was a member of the House of Representatives twice. First, from 1901 to 1904 and second, from 1909 to 1910. Additionally, he was Treasurer of Vienna, South Dakota. He was a Republican. He died on February 29, 1935. His great-grandson Art Fryslie also served in the South Dakota Legislature.
