= Burt Tulson =

American politician (born 1947)

Member of the South Dakota House of Representatives from the 2nd district
- Incumbent
- Assumed office January 11, 2013 Serving with Lana Greenfield
- Preceded by: Elaine Elliot

Member of the South Dakota House of Representatives from the 6th district
- In office January 11, 2011 – January 11, 2013
- Preceded by: Kristi Noem
- Succeeded by: Isaac Latterell

Personal details
- Born: May 22, 1947 (age 79)
- Party: Republican

Burt E. Tulson (born May 22, 1947) is an American politician and a Republican member of the South Dakota House of Representatives representing District 2 since January 11, 2013. Tulson served consecutively from January 2011 until January 11, 2013 in the District 6 seat.

== Elections ==
- 2012 Redistricted to District 2 with Republican Brock Greenfield, and with incumbent Democratic Representatives Paul Dennert running for South Dakota Senate and Elaine Elliot leaving the Legislature leaving both District 6 seats open, Tulson and Representative Greenfield ran unopposed in the June 5, 2012 Republican Primary; in the four-way November 6, 2012 General election Representative Greenfield took the first seat and Tulson took the second seat with 5,000 votes (27.69%) ahead of Democratic nominees Dennis Nemmers (who had run for a legislative seat in 2008 before withdrawing) and Danny Miles.
- 2010 When incumbent Republican Representative Kristi Noem ran for United States House of Representatives and left a District 6 seat open, Tulson ran alongside incumbent Republican Representative Greenfield unopposed for both the June 8, 2010 Republican Primary and the November 2, 2010 General election where Representative Greenfield took the first seat and Tulson took the second seat with 4,339 votes (46.51%).
