= 2022 South Dakota Commissioner of School and Public Lands election =

- November 8, 2022
| Nominee | Brock Greenfield | Timothy Azure |
| Party | Republican | Democratic |
| Popular vote | 215,742 | 107,518 |
| Percentage | 66.74% | 33.26% |
- County results Greenfield: 50–60% 60–70% 70–80% 80–90% >90% Azure: 50–60% 60–70% 70–80% 80–90%
Commissioner of School and Public Lands before election
Jarrod Johnson
Republican
Elected Commissioner of School and Public Lands
Brock Greenfield
Republican

The 2022 South Dakota Commissioner of School and Public Lands election was held on November 8, 2022, to elect the commissioner of school and public lands of South Dakota. Incumbent Republican Jarrod Johnson, who was appointed to the position following the resignation of Ryan Brunner, did not seek election to a full term in office. Republican state Senator Brock Greenfield defeated Democrat Timothy Azure to succeed Johnson.

== Republican primary ==
=== Candidates ===
==== Nominee ====
- Brock Greenfield, state senator (2015–2023)

==== Withdrew ====
- Jordan Youngberg, former state senator (2017–2020)

==== Declined ====
- Jarrod Johnson, incumbent commissioner of school and public lands (2022–2023)

== Democratic primary ==
=== Candidates ===
==== Nominee ====
- Timothy Azure

== General election ==
=== Results ===
2022 South Dakota Commissioner of School and Public Lands election
| Party | Candidate | Votes | % | ±% |
|---|---|---|---|---|
| Republican | Brock Greenfield | 215,742 | 66.74% | +4.39% |
| Democratic | Timothy Azure | 107,518 | 33.26% | −4.39% |
| Total votes | | 323,260 | 100.00% | N/A |
| Republican hold | | | | |

==== By county ====
| County | Brock Greenfield Republican | | Timothy Azure Democratic | | Margin | | Total |
| County | # | % | # | % | # | % | Total |
|---|---|---|---|---|---|---|---|
| Aurora | 815 | 74.29% | 282 | 25.71% | 533 | 48.59% | 1,097 |
| Beadle | 3,966 | 71.34% | 1,593 | 28.66% | 2,373 | 42.69% | 5,559 |
| Bennett | 572 | 60.72% | 370 | 39.28% | 202 | 21.44% | 942 |
| Bon Homme | 1,753 | 74.56% | 598 | 25.44% | 1,155 | 49.13% | 2,351 |
| Brookings | 6,965 | 61.67% | 4,329 | 38.33% | 2,636 | 23.34% | 11,294 |
| Brown | 8,351 | 63.97% | 4,703 | 36.03% | 3,648 | 27.95% | 13,054 |
| Brule | 1,368 | 71.29% | 551 | 28.71% | 817 | 42.57% | 1,919 |
| Buffalo | 133 | 35.56% | 241 | 64.44% | -108 | -28.88% | 374 |
| Butte | 3,216 | 81.07% | 751 | 18.93% | 2,465 | 62.14% | 3,967 |
| Campbell | 549 | 87.14% | 81 | 12.86% | 468 | 74.29% | 630 |
| Charles Mix | 1,993 | 69.91% | 858 | 30.09% | 1,135 | 39.81% | 2,851 |
| Clark | 1,123 | 73.74% | 400 | 26.26% | 723 | 47.47% | 1,523 |
| Clay | 2,085 | 48.22% | 2,239 | 51.78% | -154 | -3.56% | 4,324 |
| Codington | 7,516 | 73.28% | 2,740 | 26.72% | 4,776 | 46.57% | 10,256 |
| Corson | 500 | 55.80% | 396 | 44.20% | 104 | 11.61% | 896 |
| Custer | 3,634 | 75.47% | 1,181 | 24.53% | 2,453 | 50.94% | 4,815 |
| Davison | 4,776 | 71.94% | 1,863 | 28.06% | 2,913 | 43.88% | 6,639 |
| Day | 1,523 | 65.39% | 806 | 34.61% | 717 | 30.79% | 2,329 |
| Deuel | 1,467 | 77.50% | 426 | 22.50% | 1,041 | 54.99% | 1,893 |
| Dewey | 614 | 41.32% | 872 | 58.68% | -258 | -17.36% | 1,486 |
| Douglas | 1,204 | 89.05% | 148 | 10.95% | 1,056 | 78.11% | 1,352 |
| Edmunds | 1,257 | 80.58% | 303 | 19.42% | 954 | 61.15% | 1,560 |
| Fall River | 2,656 | 76.61% | 811 | 23.39% | 1,845 | 53.22% | 3,467 |
| Faulk | 746 | 83.45% | 148 | 16.55% | 598 | 66.89% | 894 |
| Grant | 2,213 | 75.22% | 729 | 24.78% | 1,484 | 50.44% | 2,942 |
| Gregory | 1,546 | 81.11% | 360 | 18.89% | 1,186 | 62.22% | 1,906 |
| Haakon | 850 | 91.10% | 83 | 8.90% | 767 | 82.21% | 933 |
| Hamlin | 2,076 | 79.85% | 524 | 20.15% | 1,552 | 59.69% | 2,600 |
| Hand | 1,124 | 80.86% | 266 | 19.14% | 858 | 61.73% | 1,390 |
| Hanson | 1,188 | 79.84% | 300 | 20.16% | 888 | 59.68% | 1,488 |
| Harding | 616 | 94.92% | 33 | 5.08% | 583 | 89.83% | 649 |
| Hughes | 4,864 | 69.61% | 2,123 | 30.39% | 2,741 | 39.23% | 6,987 |
| Hutchinson | 2,389 | 81.84% | 530 | 18.16% | 1,859 | 63.69% | 2,919 |
| Hyde | 428 | 79.41% | 111 | 20.59% | 317 | 58.81% | 539 |
| Jackson | 621 | 69.78% | 269 | 30.22% | 352 | 39.55% | 890 |
| Jerauld | 544 | 66.59% | 273 | 33.41% | 271 | 33.17% | 817 |
| Jones | 391 | 87.87% | 54 | 12.13% | 337 | 75.73% | 445 |
| Kingsbury | 1,777 | 74.26% | 616 | 25.74% | 1,161 | 48.52% | 2,393 |
| Lake | 3,071 | 68.15% | 1,435 | 31.85% | 1,636 | 36.31% | 4,506 |
| Lawrence | 7,832 | 68.65% | 3,576 | 31.35% | 4,256 | 37.31% | 11,408 |
| Lincoln | 17,072 | 66.55% | 8,581 | 33.45% | 8,491 | 33.10% | 25,653 |
| Lyman | 851 | 70.80% | 351 | 29.20% | 500 | 41.60% | 1,202 |
| Marshall | 1,068 | 61.52% | 668 | 38.48% | 400 | 23.04% | 1,736 |
| McCook | 1,750 | 75.82% | 558 | 24.18% | 1,192 | 51.65% | 2,308 |
| McPherson | 917 | 86.67% | 141 | 13.33% | 776 | 73.35% | 1,058 |
| Meade | 8,495 | 76.82% | 2,563 | 23.18% | 5,932 | 53.64% | 11,058 |
| Mellette | 375 | 63.88% | 212 | 36.12% | 163 | 27.77% | 587 |
| Miner | 663 | 74.24% | 230 | 25.76% | 433 | 48.49% | 893 |
| Minnehaha | 39,607 | 58.55% | 28,040 | 41.45% | 11,567 | 17.10% | 67,647 |
| Moody | 1,577 | 64.26% | 877 | 35.74% | 700 | 28.52% | 2,454 |
| Oglala Lakota | 240 | 10.22% | 2,109 | 89.78% | -1,869 | -79.57% | 2,349 |
| Pennington | 27,995 | 66.12% | 14,347 | 33.88% | 13,648 | 32.23% | 42,342 |
| Perkins | 1,105 | 86.60% | 171 | 13.40% | 934 | 73.20% | 1,276 |
| Potter | 881 | 85.53% | 149 | 14.47% | 732 | 71.07% | 1,030 |
| Roberts | 1,933 | 58.66% | 1,362 | 41.34% | 571 | 17.33% | 3,295 |
| Sanborn | 718 | 78.47% | 197 | 21.53% | 521 | 56.94% | 915 |
| Spink | 1,891 | 73.98% | 665 | 26.02% | 1,226 | 47.97% | 2,556 |
| Stanley | 1,033 | 75.84% | 329 | 24.16% | 704 | 51.69% | 1,362 |
| Sully | 598 | 80.92% | 141 | 19.08% | 457 | 61.84% | 739 |
| Todd | 420 | 22.59% | 1,439 | 77.41% | -1,019 | -54.81% | 1,859 |
| Tripp | 1,788 | 83.63% | 350 | 16.37% | 1,438 | 67.26% | 2,138 |
| Turner | 2,771 | 77.47% | 806 | 22.53% | 1,965 | 54.93% | 3,577 |
| Union | 4,669 | 72.88% | 1,737 | 27.12% | 2,932 | 45.77% | 6,406 |
| Walworth | 1,540 | 80.08% | 383 | 19.92% | 1,157 | 60.17% | 1,923 |
| Yankton | 5,169 | 64.72% | 2,818 | 35.28% | 2,351 | 29.44% | 7,987 |
| Ziebach | 304 | 48.56% | 322 | 51.44% | -18 | -2.88% | 626 |
| Totals | 215,742 | 66.74% | 107,518 | 33.26% | 108,224 | 33.48% | 323,260 |

Counties that flipped from Democratic to Republican

- Corson (largest city: McLaughlin)
