= Brandei Schaefbauer =

American politician

Member of the South Dakota House of Representatives from the 3rd district
- Incumbent
- Assumed office January 10, 2023 Serving with Carl E. Perry
- Preceded by: Drew Dennert

Personal details
- Born: January 9, 1974 (age 52)
- Party: Republican
- Education: Presentation College

Brandei Schaefbauer (born January 9, 1974) is an American politician currently serving in the South Dakota House of Representatives. First elected in 2022, she has represented South Dakota's 3rd legislative district as a Republican since 2023.

== Committees ==
House Transportation Committee - Member
House Health and Human Services Committee - Member

== Electoral history ==
Year	Incumbents	Party	First elected	Result	General election	Primary elections
2022	Drew Dennert	Republican	2017	Incumbent retired. Republican hold.	▌ ✓ Carl E. Perry; ▌ ✓ Brandei Schaefbauer	Republican: ▌ ✓ Carl E. Perry (inc.) 30.2%; ▌ ✓ Brandei Schaefbauer 25.0%; ▌ Richard Rylance 23.8%; ▌ Kaleb Weis 21.0%
2022	Carl E. Perry	Republican	2019	Incumbent re-elected.	▌ ✓ Carl E. Perry; ▌ ✓ Brandei Schaefbauer	Republican: ▌ ✓ Carl E. Perry (inc.) 30.2%; ▌ ✓ Brandei Schaefbauer 25.0%; ▌ Richard Rylance 23.8%; ▌ Kaleb Weis 21.0%
