= David Sigdestad =

American politician

Member of the South Dakota House of Representatives from the 1st district
- In office 2011–2013
- Succeeded by: Dennis Feickert
- In office 2001–2009

Personal details
- Born: May 15, 1942 (age 84) Bristol, South Dakota
- Party: Democratic
- Spouse: Ava
- Education: Northern State University
- Occupation: Farmer

David S. Sigdestad is a Democratic member of the South Dakota House of Representatives, representing the 1st district since 2000.
