= Marguerite Kleven =

American politician (1931–2022)

Member of the South Dakota Senate from the 29th district
- In office 1995–2004
- Preceded by: Leslie J. Kleven
- Succeeded by: Kenneth McNenny

Personal details
- Born: March 28, 1931 Fruitdale, South Dakota, U.S.
- Died: April 25, 2022 (aged 91) Sturgis, South Dakota, U.S.
- Party: Republican
- Spouse: Leslie J. Kleven
- Children: two
- Education: Black Hills State University
- Profession: Politician

Marguerite Eleanor Kleven (March 28, 1931 – April 25, 2022) was an American politician who served in the South Dakota Senate from 1995 to 2004. She entered office replacing her husband, Leslie J. Kleven, following his death in office in 1995. Kleven was succeeded by Kenneth McNenny in 2004. Kleven died in Sturgis, South Dakota on April 25, 2022, at the age of 91.
