= Herman Otten =

American politician (born 1966)

Member of the South Dakota Senate from the 6th district
- In office January 12, 2021 – January 14, 2025
- Preceded by: Ernie Otten
- Succeeded by: Ernie Otten

Member of the South Dakota House of Representatives from the 6th district
- In office January 11, 2013 – January 12, 2021
- Preceded by: Brock Greenfield
- Succeeded by: Ernie Otten; Aaron Aylward

Personal details
- Born: July 13, 1966 (age 60)
- Party: Republican

Herman Otten (born July 13, 1966) is an American politician and a former Republican member of the South Dakota Senate, representing District 6 from 2021 to 2025. He previously served in the South Dakota House of Representatives from 2013 to 2021. Otten was formerly the mayor of Tea, South Dakota.

== Elections ==
- 2012 With District 6 incumbent Republican Representatives Brock Greenfield and Burt Tulson both redistricted to District 2, Otten ran in the four-way June 5, 2012 Republican Primary and placed second with 609 votes (26.6%); in the four-way November 6, 2012 General election, Otten took the first seat with 5,739 votes (36.28%) and fellow Republican nominee Isaac Latterell took the second seat ahead of Democratic nominees Joseph Weis and Michael Jauron.
- 2024 Otten was elected to a new term representing district 6 in the South Dakota House of Representatives but declined to take office due to personal reasons. He was replaced by Tim Czmowski.
