= David Novstrup =

American politician (born 1983)

Member of the South Dakota Senate from the 3rd district
- In office January 5, 2015 – January 3, 2017
- Preceded by: Al Novstrup
- Succeeded by: Al Novstrup

Member of the South Dakota House of Representatives from the 3rd district
- In office January 3, 2007 – January 5, 2015
- Preceded by: Larry Frost
- Succeeded by: Al Novstrup

Personal details
- Born: February 2, 1983 (age 43) Aberdeen, South Dakota
- Party: Republican
- Spouse: Holly
- Children: 3
- Education: Northern State University
- Profession: Business Owner, Real Estate Agent

David A. Novstrup (born February 2, 1983, in Aberdeen, South Dakota) is an American politician and a Republican member of the South Dakota Senate representing District 3 since January 2015. He is the son of South Dakota Representative Al Novstrup. He was also a member of the South Dakota House of Representatives from 2007 to 2015.

== Education ==
Novstrup earned his BS in business management from Northern State University.

== Elections ==
- 2016: He decided not to see re-election to the senate seat.
- 2014 he defeated democrat Mark Remily after running unopposed in the republican primary.
- 2012 With incumbent Democratic Representative Dennis Feickert redistricted to District 1, Novstrup and Dan Kaiser were unopposed for the June 5, 2012, Republican Primary; in the four-way November 6, 2012, General election, Novstrup took the first seat with 5,843 votes (31.2%) and Kaiser took the second seat ahead of Democratic nominees Bill Antonides and Zachary Anderson.
- 2006 When incumbent Republican Representative Larry Frost left the Legislature and left a District 3 seat open, Novstrup and his father, incumbent Representative Al Novstrup were unopposed for the June 6, 2006, Republican Primary, and won the November 7, 2006, General election, where his father took the first seat and he took the second seat with 4,679 votes (26.6%) ahead of Democratic nominees Thomas Black (who had run for the seat in 2004) and Ted Kneebone (who had run for the Senate in 2004).
- 2008 With the senior Representative Novstrup running for South Dakota Senate and leaving a District 3 seat open, Novstrup and Isaac Latterell were unopposed for the June 3, 2008, Republican Primary; in the November 4, 2008, General election, Democratic nominee Dennis Feickert took the first seat and Novstrup took the second seat with 5,386 votes (27.69%) ahead of Democratic nominee Mark Remily and fellow Republican nominee Isaac Latterell.
- 2010 Novstrup and Isaac Latterell were again unopposed for the June 8, 2010, Republican Primary; in the four-way November 2, 2010, General election, Novstrup took the first seat with 4,562 votes (28.52%) and incumbent Democratic Representative Feickert took the second seat ahead of returning 2008 Republican nominee Isaac Latterell and Democratic nominee Tim Even; Latterell was elected to the House for District 6 in 2012.
