= Tamara St. John =

American politician

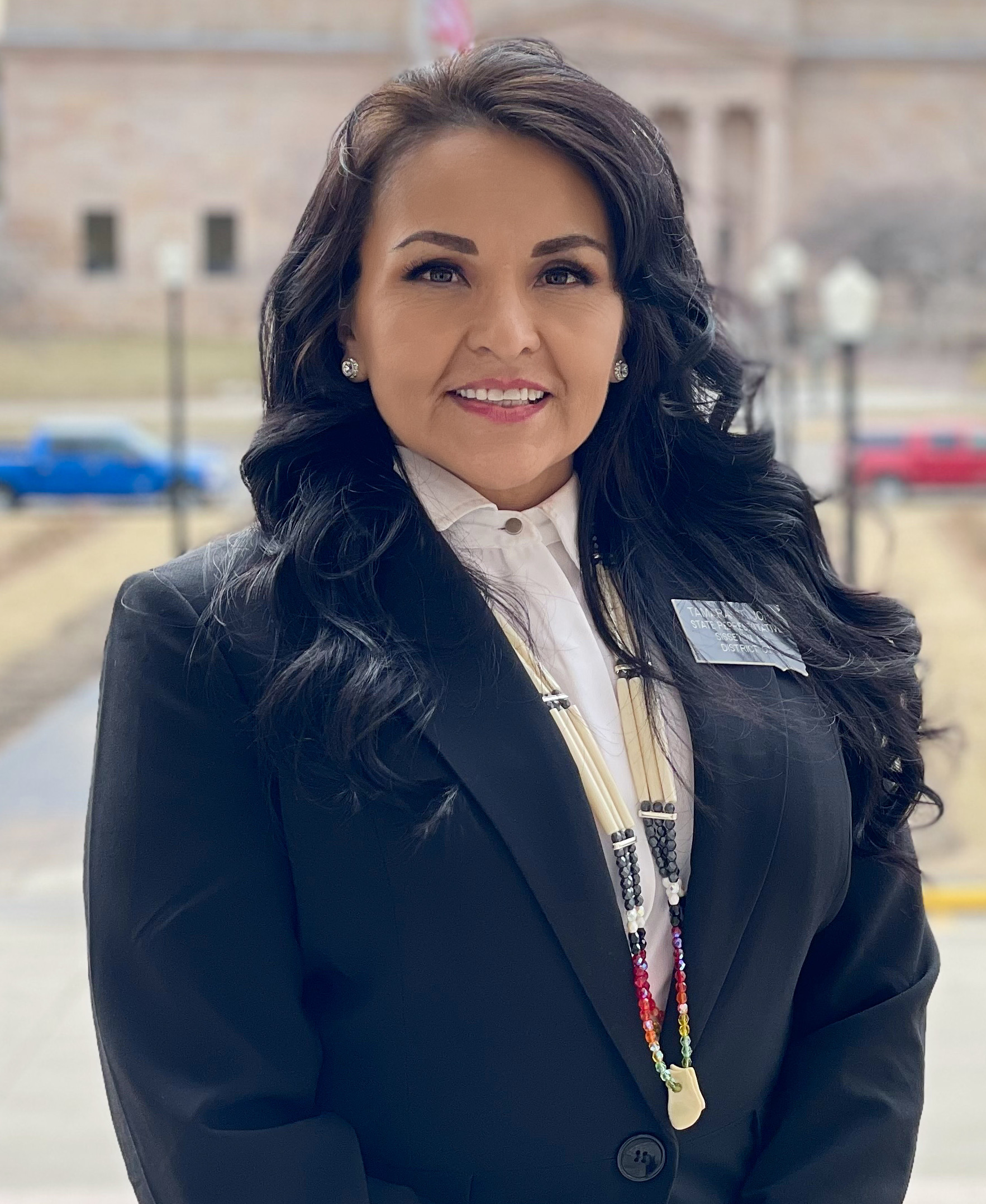

Member of the South Dakota House of Representatives from the 1st district
- In office January 8, 2019 – January 14, 2025 Serving with Joe Donnell
- Succeeded by: Logan Manhart; Christopher Reder

Personal details
- Born: July 28, 1966 (age 60) Sisseton, South Dakota, U.S.
- Citizenship: American; Dakota Sioux
- Party: Republican
- Profession: Archivist

Tamara St. John is an American politician and a Republican member of the South Dakota House of Representatives representing District 1 since January 8, 2019. With her election, St. John became the first Native American Republican woman to ever serve in the South Dakota House of Representatives.

== Early life and education ==
Tamara Jill St. John was born to Karen Brown (Keeble) and Phillip St. John on July 28, 1966, in Sisseton, South Dakota. She is an enrolled citizen of the Sisseton Wahpeton Oyate of the Lake Traverse Reservation. She attended Sisseton Public School and has a certificate in cultural heritage tourism from George Washington University.

== Private life ==
Tamara St. John has four adult children and two grandchildren. She currently resides in Sisseton, South Dakota.

== Career ==
St. John works as an historian, genealogist and has spent many years in the area of historic preservation, along with currently serving as the archivist for the Sisseton Wahpeton Tribal Archives and Collections. In this role, she specializes in community outreach and education. St. John has also worked with local, state and federal governments on issues involving historic preservation, cultural projects, and government consultations.

St. John served on the South Dakota Humanities Council as a member of the board of directors from 2016 to 2021. She also served as a delegate for the Her Vote. Her Voice. project to help South Dakota commemorate the 100th anniversary of the Women’s Suffrage Movement.

== Political career ==
When incumbent Jason Frerichs was term-limited in the State Senate, Susan Wismer ran unopposed for the Senate seat, vacating her House seat. Tamara St. John was the only Republican candidate to run in District 1, challenging former legislators Steven D. McCleerey and H. Paul Dennert in a three-way race for the two House seats. On November 6, 2018, she won her first election, coming in first place with 4,735 votes (36%) to Steven D. McCleerey’s 4,300 votes (33%). H. Paul Dennert finished with 4,139 votes (31%). She was the first Republican candidate on the ballot for District 1 in 10 years, and the first Republican candidate to win a legislative seat in District 1 in over 20 years.

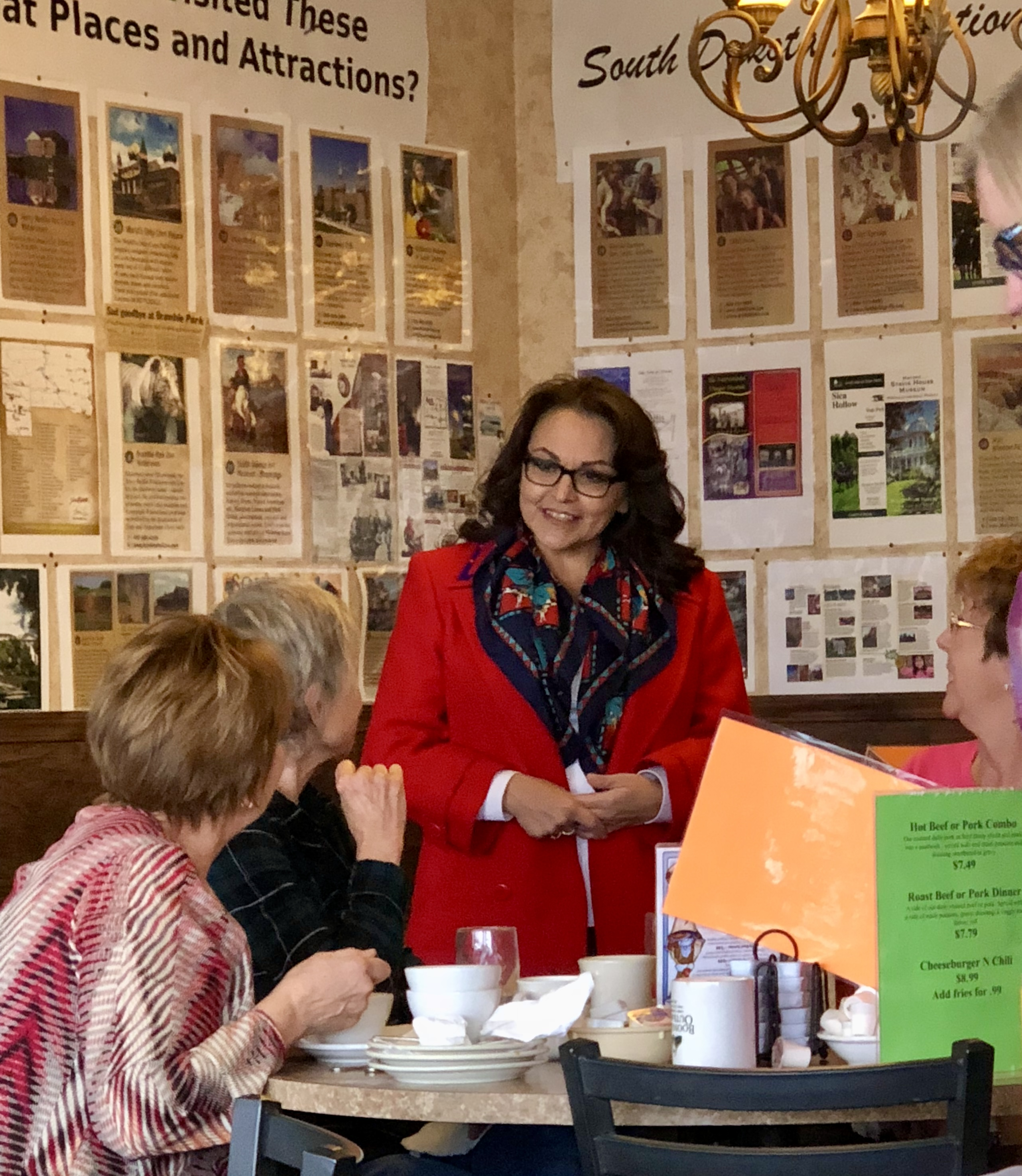
Tamara St. John campaigning during Election Day at Pereboom's Cafe in Webster, SD.

She won her second House term on November 3, 2020, after coming in first place in a three-way general election, securing 6,150 votes (41%) of the votes cast.

St. John serves on the House Judiciary Committee, House Health and Human Services Committee and Co-chairs the State-Tribal Relations Committee.

In the 2022 Legislative session, St. John brought legislation (HB 1196) to designate the traditional flute as the official indigenous instrument in South Dakota, which was signed into law by Gov. Kristi Noem.

St. John ran for reelection in 2024 but lost her primary to political newcomers, Republicans Chris Reder and Logan Manhart. St. John was one of fourteen incumbent Republicans to lose their primaries in 2024. Property rights and the usage of eminent domain for the proposed Carbon Pipeline were large factors in this large shift.

== See also ==
- List of Native American politicians
- Native American women in politics
