= Dale Slaughter =

American politician

Member of the South Dakota House of Representatives from the 8th district
- In office January 12, 1999 – January 14, 2003
- Preceded by: Richard Belatti; Doug Johnson
- Succeeded by: David Gassman

Personal details
- Born: December 17, 1928 La Plata, Missouri
- Died: June 7, 2020 (aged 91) Madison, South Dakota
- Party: Republican

Dale Slaughter (December 17, 1928 – June 7, 2020) was an American politician who served in the South Dakota House of Representatives from the 8th district from 1999 to 2003.

He died on June 7, 2020, in Madison, South Dakota at age 91.
