= Kenneth McNenny =

American politician and rancher

Member of the South Dakota Senate from the 29th district
- In office 2005–2008
- Preceded by: Marguerite Kleven
- Succeeded by: Larry Rhoden

Member of the South Dakota House of Representatives from the 29th district
- In office 1987–2000
- Succeeded by: Larry Rhoden

Personal details
- Born: Kenneth George McNenny; December 10, 1935 Rapid City, South Dakota
- Died: January 17, 2017 (aged 81)
- Party: Republican
- Spouse: Henrietta Young
- Profession: Rancher

Kenneth George "Kenny" McNenny (December 10, 1935 – January 17, 2017) was an American rancher and politician.

He served in the South Dakota House of Representatives from 1987 to 2000 and in the Senate from 2005 to 2008. He also served on the local school board.
