= Larry Rhoden =

Governor of South Dakota since 2025

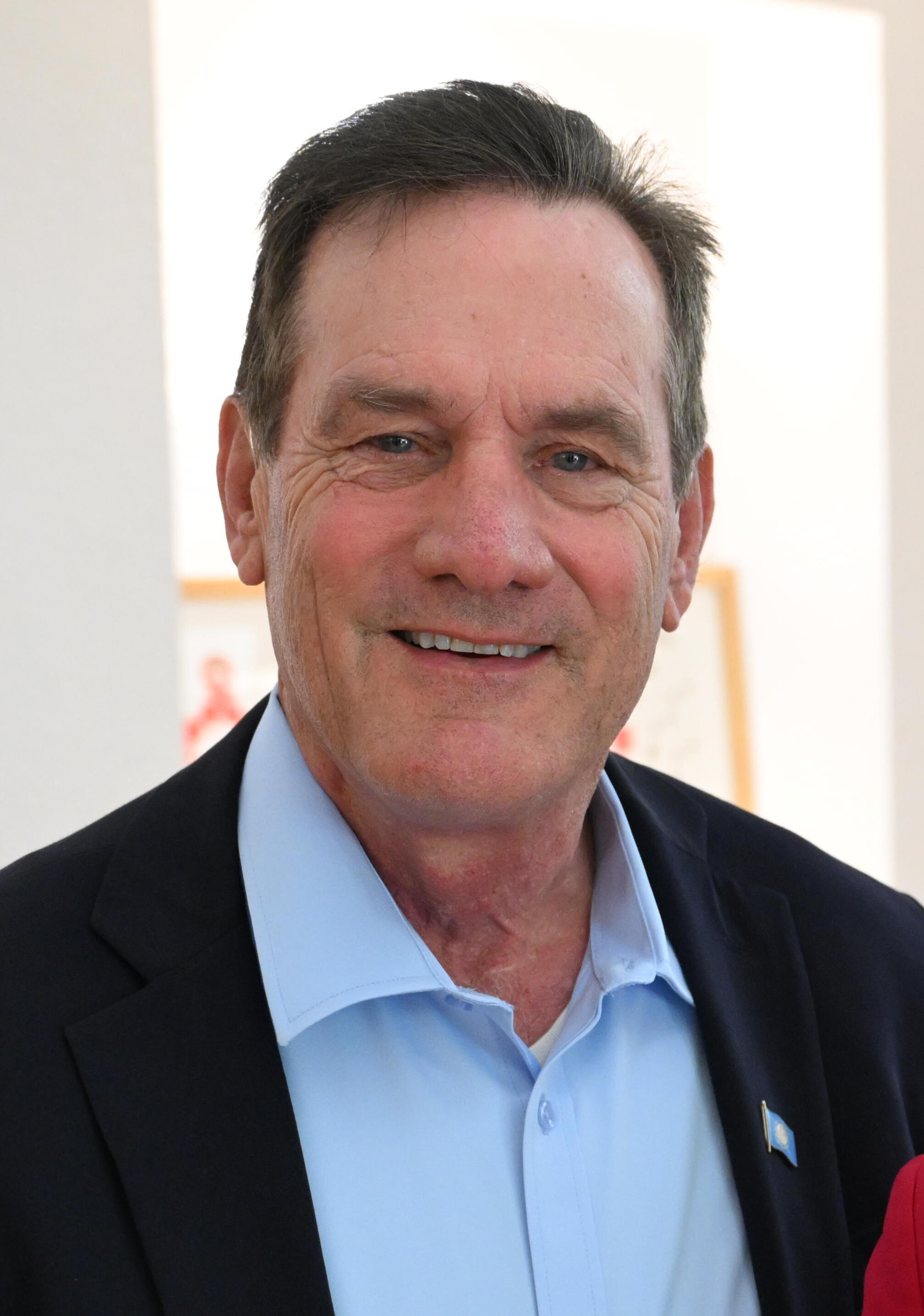
- Rhoden in 2025

34th Governor of South Dakota
- Incumbent
- Assumed office January 25, 2025
- Lieutenant: Tony Venhuizen
- Preceded by: Kristi Noem

39th Lieutenant Governor of South Dakota
- In office January 5, 2019 – January 25, 2025
- Governor: Kristi Noem
- Preceded by: Matt Michels
- Succeeded by: Tony Venhuizen

Secretary of Agriculture of South Dakota
- Acting; May 8, 2020 – August 27, 2020
- Governor: Kristi Noem
- Preceded by: Kim Vanneman
- Succeeded by: Hunter Roberts (Agriculture and Natural Resources)

Member of the South Dakota House of Representatives from the 29th district
- In office January 10, 2017 – January 5, 2019
- Preceded by: Dean Wink
- Succeeded by: Kirk Chaffee
- In office January 9, 2001 – January 13, 2009
- Preceded by: Kenneth McNenny
- Succeeded by: Dean Wink

Member of the South Dakota Senate from the 29th district
- In office January 13, 2009 – January 13, 2015
- Preceded by: Kenneth McNenny
- Succeeded by: Gary Cammack

Personal details
- Born: February 5, 1959 (age 67) Sturgis, South Dakota, U.S.
- Party: Republican
- Spouse: Sandy Murphy (m. 1981)
- Children: 4
- Website: Office website Campaign website

Military service
- Branch: United States Army
- Service years: 1978–1985
- Unit: South Dakota National Guard

Larry Robert Rhoden (born February 5, 1959) is an American politician and businessman serving since 2025 as the 34th governor of South Dakota. A member of the Republican Party, Rhoden served from 2019 to 2025 as the 39th Lieutenant Governor of South Dakota and from 2009 to 2015 and again from 2017 until 2019 in the South Dakota Legislature.

A member of the Republican Party, Rhoden served from 2001 to 2009 as a member of the South Dakota House of Representatives, from 2009 to 2015 and from 2017 to 2019 as a member of the South Dakota Senate, and from 2019 to 2025 as the 39th lieutenant governor of South Dakota. He ran for U.S. Senate in the 2014 election, losing in the Republican primary to former governor Mike Rounds. In January 2025, he became governor after Kristi Noem resigned the office to become United States Secretary of Homeland Security.

== Early life and education ==
Rhoden was born and raised on a farm. He grew up attending church, and graduated from Sunshine Bible Academy in 1977. After high school, he served in the South Dakota National Guard from 1978 to 1985. While his children were young, he served as a church trustee and on the local school board, and led the board of directors for the area Cenex.

== Early political career ==
=== South Dakota House and Senate ===
Rhoden served in the South Dakota House of Representatives from 2001 to 2008, including four years as majority leader. After being term-limited, he was elected to the state senate. In 2010, Rhoden ran for senate majority leader, but lost to Russell Olson.

Rhoden served on the Agriculture and Natural Resources and the State Affairs Committees. He backed bills to arm volunteers in schools, and sponsored a legislative finding that the "Founding Fathers freely and willingly abjured all legislative and executive authority to regulate gun ownership and usage… to individual citizens."

=== 2014 U.S. Senate candidacy ===
Rhoden ran for the U.S. Senate in 2014, calling himself a "conservative voice for limited government". He spoke out against abortion, same-sex marriage, "career politicians", "activist judges", and immigration "amnesty". Rhoden signed a pledge to never raise taxes, and supported de-funding the Patient Protection and Affordable Care Act.

Rhoden spoke at a conference organized by the conservative organization RedState, criticizing fellow candidate Mike Rounds's position on taxes. In the June 2 primary, Rounds defeated Rhoden, 41,377 votes to 13,393.

== Lieutenant governor of South Dakota (2019–2025) ==
=== 2018 gubernatorial election ===
On June 20, 2018, Republican gubernatorial nominee Kristi Noem announced that Rhoden would be her running mate. Noem had said the role of a lieutenant governor, "I would do it a little differently maybe than Daugaard and Michels have done it... I don’t see the lieutenant governor filling as big a role as Michels did. I'm just a believer that there are certain decisions the governor has to make, and so maybe it would be more of a traditional role than what we saw in the last administration."

=== Tenure ===
Rhoden took office on January 5, 2019. On May 5, 2020, Noem announced that South Dakota Secretary of Agriculture Kim Vanneman would resign effective May 8, and that Rhoden was being named interim agriculture secretary. On August 27, Noem announced that she was merging the Department of Agriculture and the Department of Environment and Natural Resources into a Department of Agriculture and Natural Resources, to be led by Secretary Hunter Roberts, thereby ending Rhoden's role as interim secretary.

On June 20, 2020, at the Republican State Convention, Rhoden was elected to be one of South Dakota's three Republican presidential electors, along with Noem and Attorney General Jason Ravnsborg.

== Governor of South Dakota (2025–present) ==
=== Accession ===
Rhoden with the United States Secretary of Homeland Security and his predecessor Kristi Noem

In November 2024, President-elect Donald Trump announced that he would nominate Kristi Noem for Secretary of Homeland Security. After her confirmation on January 25, 2025, she resigned as governor of South Dakota and Rhoden was sworn in by South Dakota Supreme Court Chief Justice Steven R. Jensen. On January 29, he chose Tony Venhuizen as his lieutenant governor. Venhuizen was unanimously confirmed by the South Dakota Senate and South Dakota House of Representatives the next day.

=== 2026 election ===
On April 24, 2025, Speaker of the South Dakota House of Representatives Jon Hansen announced his bid for the Republican nomination in the 2026 South Dakota gubernatorial election.

On May 28, Aberdeen businessman Toby Doeden announced his candidacy for the Republican nomination.

On November 18, Rhoden announced his candidacy, joining Hansen, Doeden, and U.S. Representative Dusty Johnson.

From March to June 2026, the Rhoden, Doeden, Hansen, and Johnson campaigns ran various attack ads against one another. In late April 2026, an attack ad specifically targeting Rhoden paid for by an out-of-state company known as Rushmore Principles began to appear on South Dakota television airwaves, which the Rhoden and Doeden campaigns accused the Johnson campaign of creating and spreading. In early May 2026, Rhoden told a group of journalists Johnson had attempted to blackmail him so that he would not enter the gubernatorial race.

In the first round of the Republican primary on June 2, Doeden received 41,791 votes (30.6%), Rhoden 34,379 (25.2%), Johnson 31,925 (23.4%), and Hansen 28,391 (20.8%). As no candidate received 35% of the primary vote, Doeden and Rhoden advanced to a runoff on July 28. The primary runoff was the first in South Dakota history since the provision was enacted ahead of the 1986 South Dakota gubernatorial election.

Rhoden won the primary runoff with 83,532 votes (70.8%) to Doeden's 34,430 (29.2%), becoming the Republican nominee to run for his first full term in office.

=== Tenure ===
Rhoden with former Governor of Arkansas and current Ambassador, Mike Huckabee

Early in his term, Rhoden worked with Interior Secretary Doug Burgum to order the return of the Mount Rushmore fireworks show in 2026.

In late July 2026, after a series of intense summer storms throughout South Dakota, Rhoden declared a state of emergency in affected areas Beadle County and Hyde County, and sought federal financial assistance for damages in Beadle, Hyde, Bennett, Buffalo, Day, Hand, Hughes, and Stanley Counties. Rhoden also requested that President Trump create a formal presidential disaster declaration regarding the damaging storms, saying: "This request would provide several million dollars in federal funding to help these communities recover. I thank President Trump in advance for his consideration and his help."

== Electoral history ==
=== 2018 ===
2018 South Dakota gubernatorial election
Party	Candidate	Votes	%	±%
Republican	Kristi Noem; Larry Rhoden	172,912	50.97%	−19.50%
Democratic	Billie Sutton; Michelle Lavallee	161,454	47.60%	+22.17%
Libertarian	Kurt Evans; Richard Shelatz	4,848	1.43%	N/A
Total votes		339,214	100.00%	N/A
Republican hold				

=== 2022 ===
2022 South Dakota gubernatorial election
Party	Candidate	Votes	%	±%
Republican	Kristi Noem (incumbent); Larry Rhoden (incumbent)	217,035	61.98%	+11.01%
Democratic	Jamie Smith; Jennifer Healy Keintz	123,148	35.17%	−12.43%
Libertarian	Tracey Quint; Ashley Strand	9,983	2.85%	+1.42%
Total votes		350,166	100.00%	N/A
Republican hold				

=== 2026 ===
Republican primary results for Governor of South Dakota, 2026
Party	Candidate	Votes	%
Republican	Toby Doeden	41,712	30.6
Republican	Larry Rhoden (incumbent)	34,321	25.2
Republican	Dusty Johnson	31,856	23.4
Republican	Jon Hansen	28,341	20.8
Total votes		136,230	100.0

Republican primary runoff results for Governor of South Dakota, 2026
Party	Candidate	Votes	%
Republican	Larry Rhoden (incumbent)	83,582	70.8
Republican	Toby Doeden	34,430	29.2
Total votes		118,012	100.0

== Personal life ==
Rhoden lives in Union Center, South Dakota. He and his wife, Sandy, have four children and seven grandchildren. Rhoden is a rancher by trade and runs and owns a cow-calf operation and custom welding business.

== See also ==
- List of governors of South Dakota

Party political offices
Preceded by Matt Michels	Republican nominee for Lieutenant Governor of South Dakota; 2018, 2022	Succeeded by Tony Venhuizen
Preceded by Kristi Noem	Republican nominee for Governor of South Dakota; 2026	Most recent
Political offices
Preceded by Matt Michels	Lieutenant Governor of South Dakota; 2019–2025	Succeeded by Tony Venhuizen
Preceded by Kristi Noem	Governor of South Dakota; 2025–present	Incumbent
U.S. order of precedence (ceremonial)
Preceded by JD Vance as Vice President	Order of precedence of the United States; Within South Dakota	Succeeded by Mayor of city in which event is held
Preceded by JD Vance as Vice President	Order of precedence of the United States; Within South Dakota	Succeeded by Otherwise Mike Johnson as Speaker of the House
Preceded by Kelly Armstrong as Governor of North Dakota	Order of precedence of the United States; Outside South Dakota	Succeeded by Greg Gianforte as Governor of Montana
