= Eden, South Dakota =

Eden, South Dakota Eyašiča Otuŋwe (Dakota)
- Town
- Location in Marshall County and the state of South Dakota
- Coordinates: 45°37′00″N 97°25′11″W
- Country: United States
- State: South Dakota
- County: Marshall
- Incorporated: 1916

Area
  - Total: 0.15 sq mi (0.40 km^{2})
  - Land: 0.15 sq mi (0.40 km^{2})
  - Water: 0 sq mi (0.00 km^{2})
- Elevation: 1,837 ft (560 m)

Population (2020)
  - Total: 94
  - Density: 612.1/sq mi (236.33/km^{2})
- Time zone: UTC-6 (Central (CST))
  - Summer (DST): UTC-5 (CDT)
- ZIP code: 57232
- Area code: 605
- FIPS code: 46-18180
- GNIS feature ID: 1267375

Eden (Dakota: Eyašiča Otuŋwe) is a town in Marshall County, South Dakota, United States. The population was 94 at the 2020 census.

Eden was originally called Eden Park, and under the latter name was laid out in 1915. It is the home of current South Dakota State Representative and 2022 Democratic candidate for Lieutenant Governor Jennifer Healy Keintz.

== Geography ==
According to the United States Census Bureau, the town has a total area of 0.15 square miles (0.39 km^{2}), all land.

== Demographics ==
Historical population
| Census | Pop. | Note | %± |
|---|---|---|---|
| 1920 | 209 | | — |
| 1930 | 150 | | −28.2% |
| 1940 | 171 | | 14.0% |
| 1950 | 149 | | −12.9% |
| 1960 | 136 | | −8.7% |
| 1970 | 132 | | −2.9% |
| 1980 | 142 | | 7.6% |
| 1990 | 97 | | −31.7% |
| 2000 | 97 | | 0.0% |
| 2010 | 89 | | −8.2% |
| 2020 | 94 | | 5.6% |
U.S. Decennial Census

=== 2010 census ===
As of the census of 2010, there were 89 people, 48 households, and 29 families residing in the town. The population density was 593.3 inhabitants per square mile (229.1/km^{2}). There were 63 housing units at an average density of 420.0 per square mile (162.2/km^{2}). The racial makeup of the town was 97.8% White and 2.2% from two or more races.

There were 48 households, of which 10.4% had children under the age of 18 living with them, 52.1% were married couples living together, 2.1% had a female householder with no husband present, 6.3% had a male householder with no wife present, and 39.6% were non-families. 35.4% of all households were made up of individuals, and 12.5% had someone living alone who was 65 years of age or older. The average household size was 1.85 and the average family size was 2.31.

The median age in the town was 50.8 years. 10.1% of residents were under the age of 18; 11.2% were between the ages of 18 and 24; 18% were from 25 to 44; 32.5% were from 45 to 64; and 28.1% were 65 years of age or older. The gender makeup of the town was 56.2% male and 43.8% female.

=== 2000 census ===
As of the census of 2000, there were 97 people, 48 households, and 30 families residing in the town. The population density was 642.0 inhabitants per square mile (247.9/km^{2}). There were 61 housing units at an average density of 403.7 per square mile (155.9/km^{2}). The racial makeup of the town was 98.97% White, and 1.03% from two or more races.

There were 48 households, out of which 20.8% had children under the age of 18 living with them, 52.1% were married couples living together, 10.4% had a female householder with no husband present, and 37.5% were non-families. 37.5% of all households were made up of individuals, and 22.9% had someone living alone who was 65 years of age or older. The average household size was 2.02 and the average family size was 2.63.

In the town, the population was spread out, with 17.5% under the age of 18, 3.1% from 18 to 24, 16.5% from 25 to 44, 32.0% from 45 to 64, and 30.9% who were 65 years of age or older. The median age was 53 years. For every 100 females, there were 94.0 males. For every 100 females age 18 and over, there were 100.0 males.

The median income for a household in the town was $29,000, and the median income for a family was $34,000. Males had a median income of $24,250 versus $15,833 for females. The per capita income for the town was $14,947. There were no families and 3.0% of the population living below the poverty line, including no under eighteens and none of those over 64.
