= Alan Hoerth =

American politician

Member of the South Dakota Senate from the 3rd district
- In office 2006–2008
- Preceded by: Duane Sutton
- Succeeded by: Al Novstrup

Personal details
- Born: July 1, 1958 (age 68) Burke, South Dakota
- Party: Democratic
- Occupation: real estate broker associate

Alan C. Hoerth is a former Democratic member of the South Dakota Senate, representing the 3rd district from 2006 to 2008.
