= Joe Donnell =

American politician

Member of the South Dakota House of Representatives from the 1st district
- In office 2023 – January 14, 2025 Serving with Tamara St. John
- Preceded by: Jennifer Healy Keintz

Personal details
- Citizenship: United States; Sisseton Wahpeton Oyate
- Party: Republican
- Education: Trinity Bible College and Graduate School (B.A.); Continental Theological Seminary

Joe Donnell is an American politician who has served in the South Dakota House of Representatives since 2023.

== Career ==
Donnell is the founder and director of Warriors Circle, a Christian nonprofit that works with Native Americans to develop leadership skills. He has a bachelor of arts degree in church ministries from Trinity Bible College and Graduate School, and a master's degree in theology from Continental Theological Seminary in Belgium.

== South Dakota House of Representatives ==
Donnell first ran for office in June 2022 against incumbent Mike Rohl for the 1st District of the South Dakota Senate and lost the primary election. After Logan Manhart withdrew from the District 1 House race, (Note: Manhart withdrew from the race after a lawsuit was filed alleging he failed to meet the two year residency requirement to run for the South Dakota House of Representatives.) Donnell was selected as his replacement on the ballot by the South Dakota Republican Party. He went on to win the general election and, alongside Tamara St. John, is one of two Sisseton Wahpeton Oyate tribal citizens who serve in the 2023 legislature. He introduced Governor Kristi Noem at the swearing-in ceremony for her second term.

In an interview with Meri Crouley for the Now Is The Time podcast, (Note: A podcast covering theories about the alleged American deep state, COVID-19 vaccines, and Donald Trump.) Donnell went viral after he described how he believed God revealed to him that there is a direct ley line from the Mount Rushmore National Memorial to Washington, DC. He suggested that demonic forces use the monument as a "freemason shrine" to practice witchcraft and spread communism. The Mount Rushmore National Memorial declined to comment on Donnell's claims.
