= Drew Dennert =

American politician (born 1995)

Member of the South Dakota House of Representatives from the 3rd district
- Incumbent
- Assumed office January 3, 2017 Serving with Dan Kaiser (2017-2019) Carl E. Perry (2019-Present)
- Preceded by: Al Novstrup

Member of the South Dakota House of Representatives

Personal details
- Born: August 28, 1995 (age 31) Aberdeen, South Dakota
- Party: Republican
- Spouse: Ashton
- Profession: Rancher/Farmer
- Website: www.drewdennert.com

Drew Dennert (born August 28, 1995 in Aberdeen, SD) is an American politician and a Republican member of the South Dakota House of Representatives serving since January 2017. He is the grandson of former Democratic legislator Paul Dennert.

Dennert first elected in 2016 holds the record of the youngest legislator in South Dakota history.

== Elections ==
- 2020 Dennert was re-elected with 7,108 votes; Carl Perry was also re-elected with 6,087 votes and Leslie McLaughlin received 3,843 votes and Justin Roemmick received 3,720 votes.
- 2018. Incumbent Representative Dan Kaiser did not run for re-election leaving one seat open. Representative Drew Dennert ran for re-election alongside Republican Carl Perry, Democrat Brooks Briscoe and Democrat Justin Roemmick. Dennert and Perry won the two seats earning 32% and 29% respectively, Briscoe and Roemmick finished in 3rd and 4th with 21% and 18%.
- 2016. Incumbent Representative Al Novstrup chose to run for the Senate, vacating his position in the House. Dennert ran for the Republican nomination and came in 2nd with 37% of the vote, incumbent Dan Kaiser came in 1st with 45% and Aberdeen school board member Todd Kolden came in 3rd with 18%. Dennert and Kaiser ran in the general election against Democrats Brooks Briscoe and Nikki Bootz. Kaiser came in 1st with 34.4%, Dennert came in 2nd with 33.2%, Briscoe came in 3rd with 17.9% and Bootz came in 4th with 14.5%
