= Jim Sperry (politician) =

American politician (1930–2021)

James Allen Sperry (September 24, 1930 – January 5, 2021) was an American politician who served as a Democratic member of the South Dakota House of Representatives, representing District 2 from 1997 to 1998.

Sperry was born in Aberdeen, South Dakota, and died as a result of COVID-19 at a hospital in Aberdeen, amidst the COVID-19 pandemic in South Dakota. He was 90 years old.
