= Doug Kazmerzak =

American politician

Member of the South Dakota House of Representatives from the 6th district
- In office January 14, 1997 – January 9, 2001
- Preceded by: Douglas Bierschbach; Roger G. Lee
- Succeeded by: Al Koistinen

Personal details
- Born: April 20, 1954 (age 72) Lake Preston, South Dakota
- Party: Democratic

Doug Kazmerzak (born April 20, 1954) is an American politician who served in the South Dakota House of Representatives from the 6th district from 1997 to 2001.
