= Burt Elliott =

American politician (1947–2024)

Member of the South Dakota House of Representatives from the 2nd district
- In office 2001–2008

Personal details
- Born: July 23, 1947 Aberdeen, South Dakota
- Died: January 27, 2024 (aged 76)
- Party: Democratic
- Spouse: Elaine
- Education: Northern State University
- Profession: Educator

Burton B. "Burt" Elliott (July 23, 1947 – January 27, 2024) was an American politician who served as a Democratic member of the South Dakota House of Representatives, representing the 2nd district from 2001 to 2008. He served as Minority Whip from 2005 to 2008.

He served on the Brown County Commission from 2009 to 2012.
