= Al Novstrup =

American politician (born 1954)

Member of the South Dakota Senate from the 3rd district
- Incumbent
- Assumed office January 3, 2017
- Preceded by: David Novstrup

Member of the South Dakota Senate from the 3rd district
- In office January 5, 2009 – January 5, 2015
- Preceded by: Alan Hoerth
- Succeeded by: David Novstrup

Member of the South Dakota House of Representatives from the 3rd district
- In office January 2003 – January 2009
- Preceded by: Burt Elliott
- Succeeded by: Dennis Feickert

Member of the South Dakota House of Representatives from the 3rd district
- In office January 5, 2015 – January 3, 2017
- Preceded by: David Novstrup
- Succeeded by: Drew Dennert

Personal details
- Born: August 4, 1954 (age 72) Sisseton, South Dakota, U.S.
- Party: Republican
- Spouse: Kathy Novstrup
- Children: 2
- Education: South Dakota State University (BS)
- Profession: Businessman, politician

Al Novstrup (born August 4, 1954) is business owner, an American politician and a Republican member of the South Dakota House of Representatives representing District 3 since January 2015.

== Education ==
Novstrup earned his BS in economics from South Dakota State University.

== Career ==
Novstrup has served in the South Dakota Legislature since 2003. He was a member of the State House of Representatives from 2003-2009 and 2015 to 2017 and a member of the South Dakota Senate from 2009–2015 and from 2017 to present.

== Elections ==
- In 2018, he was re-elected to the state senate after winning a rematch with liberal blogger and substitute teacher Cory Heidelberger.
- In 2016, he ran & won seat in the senate against liberal blogger and substitute teacher Cory Heidelberger.
- In 2014, he was elected back to the house. He currently serves with Dan Kaiser.
- 2012 Novstrup was unopposed for the June 5, 2012 Republican Primary and won the November 6, 2012 General election with 5,553 votes (53.56%) against Democratic Representative and former Senator Paul Dennert.
- 2002 When House District 3 incumbent Democratic Representative Burt Elliott was redistricted to District 2, Novstrup and incumbent Representative Larry Frost were unopposed for the June 4, 2002 Republican Primary; in the four-way November 5, 2002 General election Representative Frost took the first seat and Novstrup took the second seat with 5,685 votes (29.96%) ahead of Democratic nominees Tim Even and Anne-Marie Maldoon.
- 2004 Novstrup and Representative Frost were unopposed for the June 1, 2004 Republican Primary and won the four-way November 2, 2004 General election where Representative Frost took the first seat and Novstrup took the second seat with 5,824 votes (29.58%) ahead of Democratic nominees Teresa Flamboe and Thomas Black.
- 2006 When incumbent Representative Frost left the Legislature and left a District 3 seat open, Novstrup and his son David Novstrup were unopposed for the June 6, 2006 Republican Primary and won the November 7, 2006 General election, where Novstrup took the first seat with 5,010 votes (28.48%) and his son took the second seat ahead of returning 2004 Democratic challenger Thomas Black and Democratic nominee Ted Kneebone (who had run for the Senate in 2004).
- 2008 To challenge District 3 incumbent Democratic Senator Alan Hoerth, Novstrup was unopposed for the June 3, 2008 Republican Primary, and won the November 4, 2008 General election with 5,872 votes (54.97%) against Senator Hoerth.
- 2010 Novstrup and former Senator Hoerth were both unopposed for both their June 8, 2010, primaries, setting up a rematch; Novstrup won the November 2, 2010 General election with 5,281 votes (59.93%) against Senator Hoerth.
