= Dan Sutton =

American politician

Member of the South Dakota Senate from the 8th district
- In office 2001–2008

Personal details
- Born: August 4, 1970 (age 56) Flandreau, South Dakota
- Party: Democratic
- Spouse: Mary Beth
- Education: Northern State University
- Occupation: Insurance

Daniel D. Sutton (born August 4, 1970) was a Democratic member of the South Dakota Senate, representing the 8th district from 2001 through 2008. During his time in the state senate, he served as Minority Whip. Sutton was a member of the South Dakota House of Representatives from 1999 through 2000.

== Sexual abuse allegations ==
In 2007, Sutton was sued for sexually abusing an 18-year-old legislative page. The case was settled with no money being paid to the person.
