= Paul Nelson (South Dakota politician) =

American politician

Member of the South Dakota House of Representatives
- In office 2005–2008

Personal details
- Party: Republican

Paul Nelson is an American politician. He served as a Republican member of the South Dakota House of Representatives.
