= Ernie Otten =

American politician

Ernie Otten Jr.

Member of the South Dakota Senate from the 6th district.
- Incumbent
- Assumed office January 1, 2025
- Preceded by: Herman Otten
- In office January 1, 2013 – January 1, 2021
- Preceded by: Arthur Fryslie
- Succeeded by: Herman Otten

Member of the South Dakota House of Representatives from the 6th district
- In office January 1, 2021 – January 1, 2025
- Preceded by: Herman Otten
- Succeeded by: Herman Otten

Personal details
- Born: June 29, 1954 (age 72) Sioux Falls, South Dakota, U.S.
- Party: Republican
- Website: ottenforsenate.com

Ernest 'Ernie' E. Otten, Jr. (born June 29, 1954) is an American politician and a Republican member of the South Dakota Senate and Majority Whip of said chamber representing District 6 since January 1, 2025, having previously represented this seat from January 1, 2013 to January 1, 2021. He previously served in the South Dakota House of Representatives from 2021 to 2025.

== Elections ==
- 2012 With incumbent Senate District 6 Republican Senator Art Fryslie redistricted to District 2, Otten won the June 5, 2012 Republican Primary with 772 votes (58.5%) against Representative and former Senator Gene Abdallah; and won the November 6, 2012 General election with 6,011 votes (65.4%) against Democratic nominee Richard Schriever.
- 1996 To challenge incumbent Democratic Representative Roland Chicoine, Otten and incumbent Republican Representative Mike Broderick were unopposed for the 1996 Republican Primary, but Otten lost the four-way November 5, 1996 General election, where Representative Broderick took the first seat and Representative Chicoine took the second seat ahead of Otten and Democratic nominee Richard Dubro.
