= Jim Hundstad =

American politician

Member of the South Dakota Senate from the 2nd district
- In office 2004–present

Personal details
- Born: December 16, 1941 (age 84) Aberdeen, South Dakota
- Party: Democratic
- Spouse: Barbara
- Education: Northern State University
- Profession: Educator, farmer, business owner

James E. Hundstad is a Democratic member of the South Dakota Senate, representing the 2nd district since 2004. Previously he was a member of the South Dakota House of Representatives from 2000 through 2004.
