= Steven McCleerey =

American politician

Member of the South Dakota House of Representatives from the 1st district
- In office January 13, 2015 – January 12, 2021 Serving with Tamara St. John
- Preceded by: Susan Wismer
- Succeeded by: Jennifer Healy Keintz

Personal details
- Born: March 10, 1953 (age 73) Sisseton, South Dakota, U.S.
- Party: Democratic
- Education: South Dakota State University (BS)

Steven D. McCleerey (born March 10, 1953) is an American politician and farmer who served as a member of the South Dakota House of Representatives for the first district. Elected in 2015, McCleerey previously served as Assistant House Democratic Leader. On August 12, 2026, McCleery was chosen as Dan Ahlers' running mate for governor in 2026.

== Early life and education ==
McCleerey was born and raised in Sisseton, South Dakota. He attended South Dakota State University, where he studied Agriculture.

== Career ==
Prior to entering politics, McCleerey worked as a grain farmer. McCleerey took office on December 13, 2015, and represents the first district with Republican Tamara St. John. McCleerey is a member of the South Dakota Democratic Party. He endorsed Hillary Clinton in the 2016 United States presidential election and Joe Biden in the 2020 United States presidential election. McCleerey is a member of the House Committee on Commerce and Energy, Military and Veterans Affairs, Retirement Laws, and State Affairs.
