= Vienna, South Dakota =

- Town
- Location in Clark County and the state of South Dakota
- Coordinates: 44°42′11″N 97°30′00″W
- Country: United States
- State: South Dakota
- County: Clark
- Founded: 1886

Area
  - Total: 0.84 sq mi (2.18 km^{2})
  - Land: 0.84 sq mi (2.18 km^{2})
  - Water: 0 sq mi (0.00 km^{2})
- Elevation: 1,837 ft (560 m)

Population (2020)
  - Total: 49
  - Density: 58.2/sq mi (22.48/km^{2})
- Time zone: UTC-6 (Central (CST))
  - Summer (DST): UTC-5 (CDT)
- ZIP code: 57271
- Area code: 605
- FIPS code: 46-67220
- GNIS feature ID: 1267615

Vienna (/vaɪˈɛnə/) is a town in Clark County, South Dakota, United States. The population was 49 at the 2020 census.

A large share of the early settlers were natives of Austria who named the village after the Austrian capital.

== Geography ==
According to the United States Census Bureau, the town has a total area of 0.84 square miles (2.18 km^{2}), all land.

== Demographics ==
Historical population
Census	Pop.	Note	%±
1900	171		—
1910	453		164.9%
1920	477		5.3%
1930	443		−7.1%
1940	313		−29.3%
1950	306		−2.2%
1960	191		−37.6%
1970	119		−37.7%
1980	90		−24.4%
1990	93		3.3%
2000	78		−16.1%
2010	45		−42.3%
2020	49		8.9%
U.S. Decennial Census

=== 2010 census ===
As of the census of 2010, there were 45 people, 18 households, and 10 families residing in the town. The population density was 53.6 inhabitants per square mile (20.7/km^{2}). There were 22 housing units at an average density of 26.2 per square mile (10.1/km^{2}). The racial makeup of the town was 95.6% White and 4.4% from two or more races.

There were 18 households, of which 22.2% had children under the age of 18 living with them, 44.4% were married couples living together, 11.1% had a female householder with no husband present, and 44.4% were non-families. 44.4% of all households were made up of individuals, and 22.3% had someone living alone who was 65 years of age or older. The average household size was 2.50 and the average family size was 3.70.

The median age in the town was 44.5 years. 31.1% of residents were under the age of 18; 6.7% were between the ages of 18 and 24; 13.3% were from 25 to 44; 33.4% were from 45 to 64; and 15.6% were 65 years of age or older. The gender makeup of the town was 46.7% male and 53.3% female.

=== 2000 census ===
As of the census of 2000, there were 78 people, 28 households, and 16 families residing in the town. The population density was 92.7 inhabitants per square mile (35.8/km^{2}). There were 41 housing units at an average density of 48.7 per square mile (18.8/km^{2}). The racial makeup of the town was 94.87% White, 1.28% Native American, and 3.85% from two or more races. Hispanic or Latino of any race were 5.13% of the population.

There were 28 households, out of which 39.3% had children under the age of 18 living with them, 53.6% were married couples living together, 7.1% had a female householder with no husband present, and 39.3% were non-families. 35.7% of all households were made up of individuals, and 21.4% had someone living alone who was 65 years of age or older. The average household size was 2.79 and the average family size was 3.82.

In the town, the population was spread out, with 41.0% under the age of 18, 3.8% from 18 to 24, 25.6% from 25 to 44, 11.5% from 45 to 64, and 17.9% who were 65 years of age or older. The median age was 30 years. For every 100 females, there were 85.7 males. For every 100 females age 18 and over, there were 91.7 males.

The median income for a household in the town was $16,875, and the median income for a family was $25,625. Males had a median income of $28,750 versus $18,750 for females. The per capita income for the town was $5,244. There were 11.1% of families and 14.3% of the population living below the poverty line, including 6.3% of under eighteens and 15.4% of those over 64.
