= Jennifer Healy Keintz =

American politician and businesswoman

Jennifer Keintz

Member of the South Dakota House of Representatives from the 1st district
- In office January 12, 2021 – 2023
- Preceded by: Steven McCleerey
- Succeeded by: Joe Donnell

Personal details
- Born: August 13, 1973 (age 52) Aberdeen, South Dakota, United States
- Party: Democratic
- Spouse: Corey Keintz (m. 2014)
- Children: 1 daughter
- Education: South Dakota State University (BS, MS)

Jennifer Healy Keintz (born 13 August 1973) is an American politician and businesswoman who was a member of the South Dakota House of Representatives from the 1st district. Elected in 2020, she assumed office on January 12, 2021.

== Early life and education ==
Keintz was born in Aberdeen, South Dakota. At age four, her family relocated to Wisconsin where she started school. Her family later moved to Ivanhoe, Minnesota. Keintz attended Ivanhoe Public School, graduating in 1991 from Lincoln HI Public School, after Ivanhoe and Hendricks, Minnesota schools consolidated in 1990. She earned a Bachelor of Science degree in journalism in 1995 and a Master of Science in communication studies and journalism in 1998 from South Dakota State University.

== Career ==
While attending graduate school, Keintz worked full time as a video producer in the Instructional Technologies Center at South Dakota State University in Brookings, South Dakota. Upon graduating with her master's degree, she relocated to Providence, Rhode Island, where she worked as a Marketing Analyst at online brokerage Suretrade.

In 1999, she moved to New York City where she lived until 2003. Keintz held positions as director of customer experience at Trade.com, research analyst at Frank N. Magid Associates, and manager of usability and website analytics at Barnes & Noble.

From 2003 to 2009, Keintz held various strategic marketing roles for some of the largest homebuilders in the United States. These included Strategic Marketing Manager at Centex Homes in Southfield, Michigan, director of strategic marketing for PulteGroup in Jacksonville, Florida, and director of strategy and marketing for Centex Homes's Midwest Region, based in Minnetonka, Minnesota.

Keintz returned to Frank N. Magid Associates in 2009 as a senior strategist in their Bloomington, Minnesota, office. She spent time working abroad, including an extended consulting assignment with Deltatre in Italy providing support to FIFA at the 2010 World Cup in Johannesburg, South Africa.

In 2014, Keintz moved to Eden, South Dakota, and established an independent real estate brokerage firm, Dakota View Realty and Auctions, in 2015. In addition to a South Dakota Real Estate Broker license, Keintz holds a South Dakota State-Registered Appraiser license.

In 2020, she was elected to the South Dakota House of Representatives, defeating Democratic incumbent Steven McCleerey. She was the 2022 democratic nominee for lieutenant governor.

== Personal life ==
Healy married Corey Keintz in 2014. Their daughter was born in 2016.

Party political offices
| Preceded by Michelle Lavallee | Democratic nominee for Lieutenant Governor of South Dakota; 2022 | Most recent |
