= Dennis Feickert =

American politician (born 1948)

Member of the South Dakota House of Representatives from the 1st district
- In office January 11, 2013 – 2017 Serving with Susan Wismer (2013–present)
- Preceded by: David Sigdestad

Member of the South Dakota House of Representatives from the 3rd district
- In office January 2009 – January 11, 2013 Serving with David Novstrup (2009–2013)
- Succeeded by: Dan Kaiser

Personal details
- Born: June 19, 1948 (age 78) Aberdeen, South Dakota
- Party: Democratic
- Profession: County commissioner

Dennis Feickert (born June 19, 1948) is an American politician and a Democratic member of the South Dakota House of Representatives representing District 1 since January 11, 2013. Fieckert served consecutively from January 2009 until January 11, 2013 in the District 3 seat. Fieckert was a county commissioner for Brown County from 1987 until 2009.

== Elections ==
- 2012 Redistricted to District 1, and with incumbent Democratic Representative David Sigdestad leaving the Legislature and leaving a District 1 seat open, Feickert and Susan Wismer were unopposed for both the June 5, 2012 Democratic Primary and the November 6, 2012 General election, where Feickert took the first seat with 5,967 votes (55.2%) and Wismer took the second seat.
- 2008 When House District 3 incumbent Republican Representative Al Novstrup ran for South Dakota Senate and left a District 3 seat open, Feickert ran in the June 3, 2008 Democratic Primary; in the four-way November 4, 2008 General election Feickert took the first seat with 5,561 votes (28.59%) and incumbent Republican Representative David Novstrup took the second seat ahead of Democratic nominee Mark Remily and Republican nominee Isaac Latterell.
- 2010 Feickert ran in the June 8, 2010 Democratic Primary; in the four-way November 2, 2010 General election, incumbent Republican Representative David Novstrup took the first seat and Feickert took the second seat with 4,355 votes (27.23%) ahead of returning 2008 Republican nominee Isaac Latterell and Democratic nominee Tim Even; Latterell was elected to the House for District 6 in 2012.
