= Aaron Aylward =

American politician (born 1986)

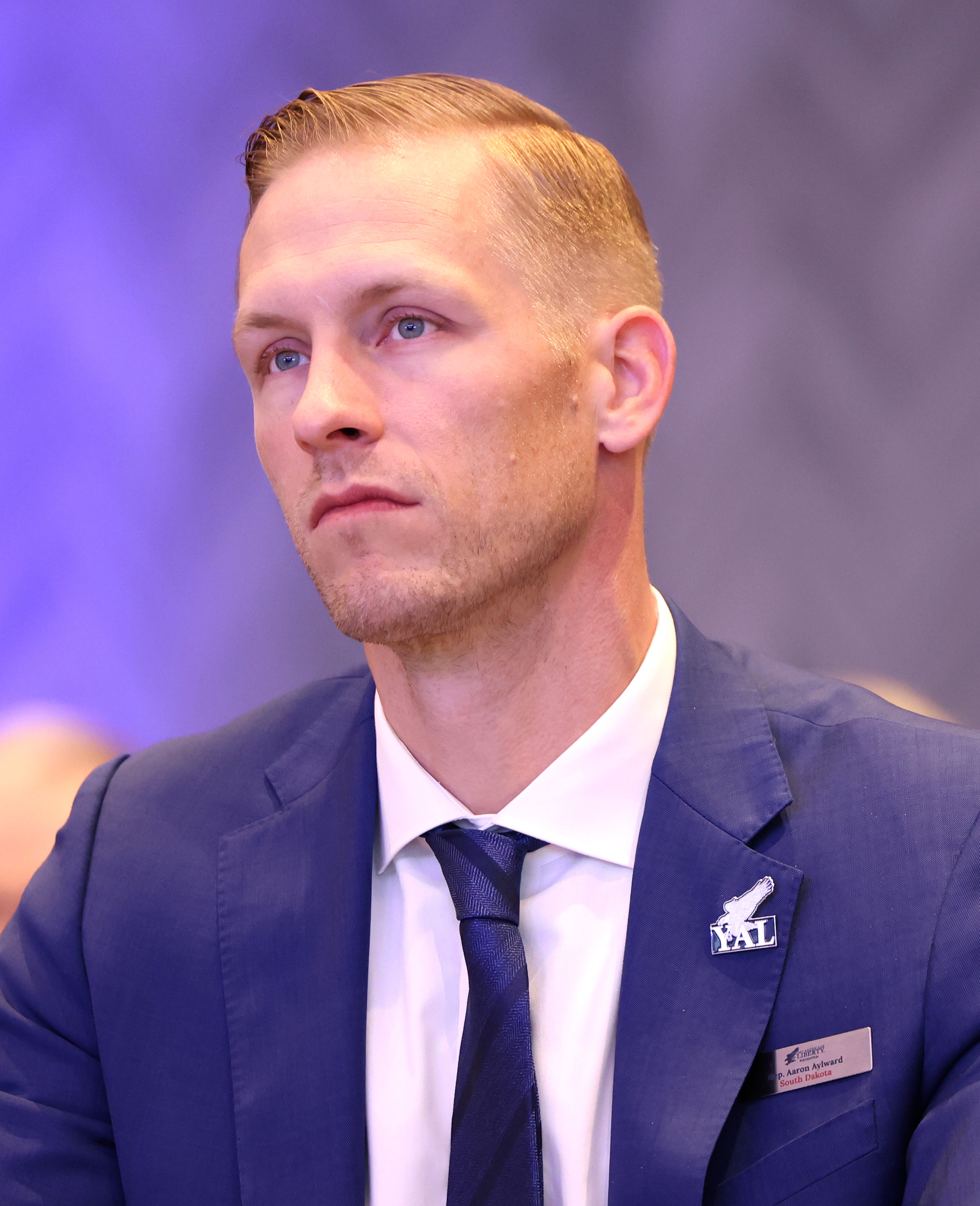
- Aylward at the 2024 Hazlitt Summit hosted by Young Americans for Liberty Foundation

Member of the South Dakota House of Representatives from the 6th district
- Incumbent
- Assumed office January 12, 2021 Serving with Herman Otten

Personal details
- Born: August 13, 1986 (age 40)
- Party: Republican (since 2020); Libertarian (2018); Republican (2012-2016)
- Education: Dakota State University (BA); University of South Dakota (MA)

Aaron Aylward (born August 13, 1986) is an American politician serving as a member of the South Dakota House of Representatives from the 6th district. Elected in November 2020, he assumed office on January 12, 2021. He is the former Chairman and current member of the South Dakota Freedom Caucus.

== Education ==
Aylaward earned a Bachelor of Arts degree in exercise science from Dakota State University and a Master of Arts in kinesiology from the University of South Dakota. While at Dakota State University, he was a member of the Dakota State Trojans football team. Following the 2008 season he was named to the DAC All-Conference team.

== Career ==
In 2012 and 2013, Aylward worked as a personal trainer. From 2013 to 2019, Aylward worked as a search consultant for Growing People and Companies (GPAC). In 2019, he became a sales representative for Cintas, a business services firm. In 2018, he was an unsuccessful candidate for the South Dakota House as a Libertarian. Aylward successfully ran for the South Dakota House of Representatives District 6 in 2020 and assumed office on January 12, 2021. He decided not to run for re-election in 2026.

== Committee assignments ==
2021–2022

- House Health and Human Services Committee
- House Judiciary Committee

2023–2024

- House Local Government Committee
- House Military and Veterans' Affairs Committee
- House Taxation Committee

2025–2026

- House Commerce and Energy Committee
- House Military and Veterans' Affairs Committee
- House Taxation Committee

== Electoral history ==
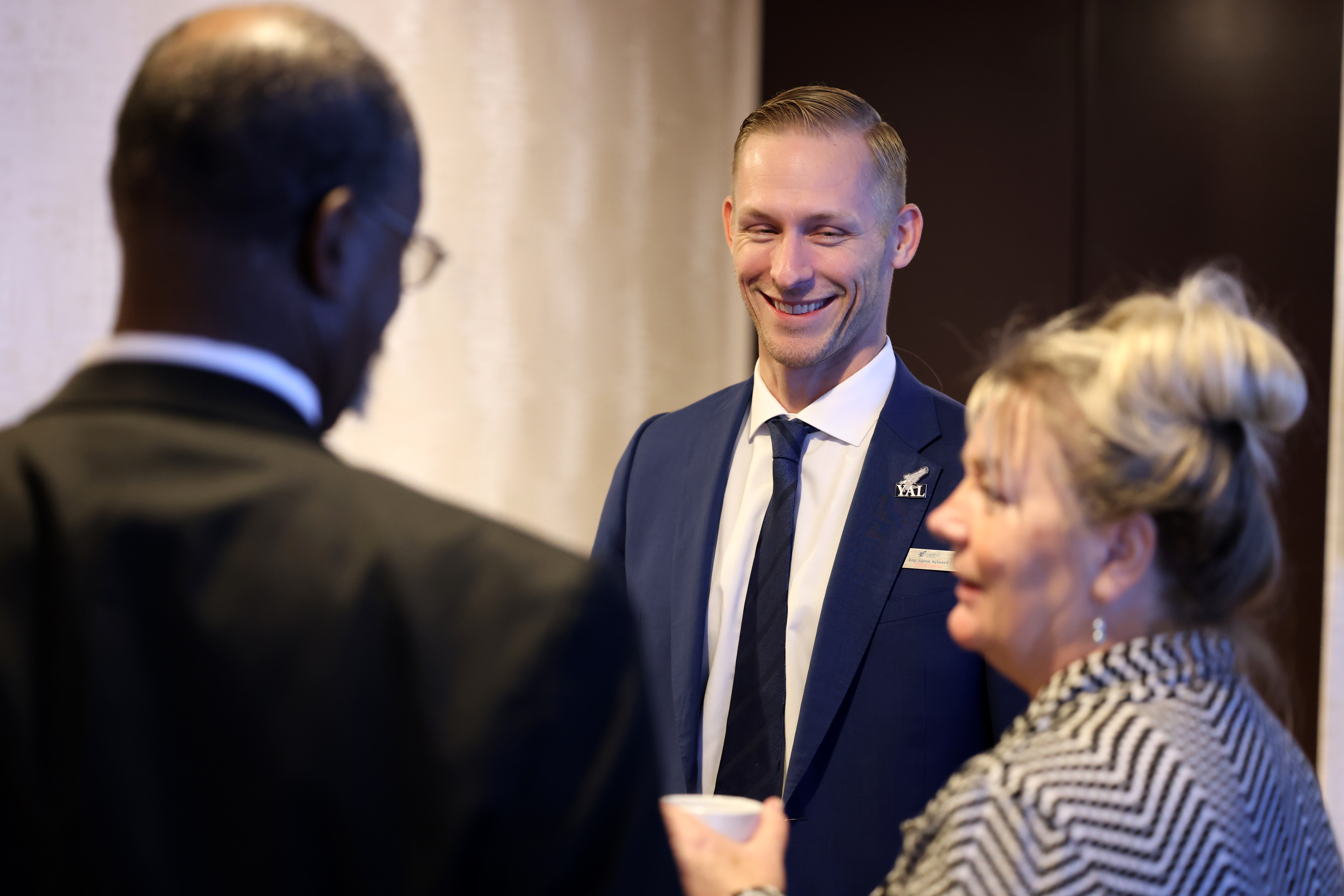
Aaron Aylward at the 2024 Hazlitt Summit in Nashville, Tennessee

South Dakota House of Representatives District 6 General Election, 2024
Party	Candidate	Votes	%
Republican	Herman Otten	7,216	41.7
Republican	Aaron Aylward	6,534	37.8
Democrat	Garret Campbell	3,546	20.5

South Dakota House of Representatives District 6 Primary Election, 2024
Party	Candidate	Votes	%
Republican	Aaron Aylward	687	40.0
Republican	Herman Otten	566	33.0
Republican	Wendi Hogan	463	27.0

South Dakota House of Representatives District 6 General Election, 2022
Party	Candidate	Votes	%
Republican	Ernie Otten Jr.	5,559	59.9
Republican	Aaron Aylward	3,715	40.1

South Dakota House of Representatives District 6 General Election, 2020
Party	Candidate	Votes	%
Republican	Ernie Otten Jr.	9,504	45.1
Republican	Aaron Aylward	6,504	30.8
Democrat	Cody Ingle	5,084	24.1

South Dakota House of Representatives District 6 Primary Election, 2020
Party	Candidate	Votes	%
Republican	Ernie Otten Jr.	1,551	37.9
Republican	Aaron Aylward	1,098	26.8
Republican	Nathan Block	1,064	26.0
Republican	Thomas Werner	384	9.4

South Dakota House of Representatives District 6 General Election, 2018
Party	Candidate	Votes	%
Republican	Herman Otten	5,911	31.0
Republican	Isaac Latterell	5,490	28.8
Democrat	Nancy Kirstein	3,399	17.8
Democrat	Kyle Boese	3,357	17.6
Libertarian	Aaron Aylward	930	4.9

== Football career statistics ==
Legend
**Bold**	Career high

=== College ===
Year	Team	GP	Cmb	Solo	Ast	Sck	Int	FF	FR
2006	Dakota State	**11**	**60**	18	**42**	1.0	**1**	**1**	**1**
2007	Dakota State	9	46	17	29	1.0	0	0	0
2008	Dakota State	9	48	**31**	17	**4.5**	0	0	0
