= Larry Frost =

American politician

Member of the South Dakota House of Representatives from the 3rd district
- In office 2001–2006

Personal details
- Born: December 15, 1940 (age 85) Ashton, South Dakota, U.S.
- Party: Republican
- Profession: Manager, Northwestern Public Service Company

Larry E. Frost (born December 15, 1940) is an American former politician. He served in the South Dakota House of Representatives from 2001 to 2006.
