= Art Fryslie =

American politician (1941–2024)

Arthur Eugene Fryslie (October 25, 1941 – December 1, 2024) was an American politician.

== Life and career ==
Born in Watertown, South Dakota, Fryslie grew up in nearby Willow Lake. He graduated from Vienna High School in Vienna, South Dakota and went to South Dakota State University. Fryslie was a farmer and was a local Republican Party politician. He served in the South Dakota House of Representatives from 1999 to 2007 and then the South Dakota State Senate from 2009 to 2013. His great-grandfather was Anton Fryslie, who also served in the South Dakota Legislature.

Fryslie died at his home near Vienna, South Dakota, on December 1, 2024, at the age of 83.
