= Paul Dennert =

American politician

Member of the South Dakota House of Representatives from the 2nd district
- In office 2005–2012
- Preceded by: Jim Hundstad
- Succeeded by: Brock Greenfield

Personal details
- Born: June 25, 1937 (age 89) Columbia, South Dakota
- Party: Democratic
- Spouse: Peggy J.
- Occupation: Farmer, cattleman

H. Paul Dennert is a Democratic member of the South Dakota House of Representatives, representing District 2 since 2005. He earlier served in the House from 1993 through 1996, and the South Dakota Senate from 1997 through 2004.
