= Northern State University =

Public university in Aberdeen, South Dakota, US

- Former names: Northern Normal and Industrial School (1901–1939); Northern State Teachers College (1939–1964); Northern State College (1964–1989)
- Motto: Unleash your potential Join the pack
- Type: Public university
- Established: 1901; 125 years ago
- Endowment: $52 million
- President: Alan LaFave
- Faculty: 120
- Students: 3,622
- Location: Aberdeen, South Dakota, United States; 45°27′05″N 98°29′01″W
- Campus: Suburban
- Colors: Maroon and Gold
- Nickname: Wolves
- Sporting affiliations: NCAA Division II – NSIC
- Mascot: Thunder the Wolf
- Website: northern.edu
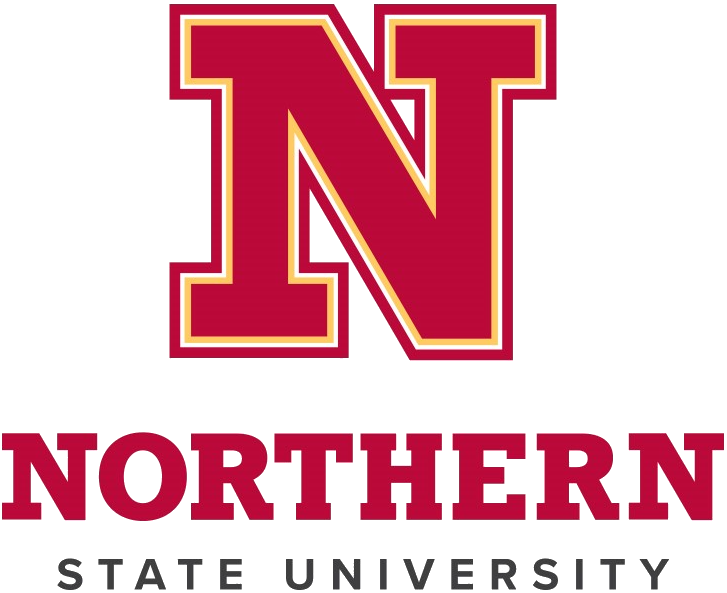

Northern State University (NSU) is a public university in Aberdeen, South Dakota, United States. NSU is governed by the South Dakota Board of Regents and offers 45 bachelor's degrees, 53 minors, six associate degrees, 16 pre-professional programs, 23 certificates and 10 graduate degrees.

== History ==
Aberdeen, South Dakota, had rapid population growth during the late 19th century, leading the citizens of northern South Dakota to push for a government-funded institute of higher learning. In the 1885 legislative session, a bill was passed creating what was then known as the University of Central Dakota in the small town of Ordway, South Dakota. Funds were approved for the school in the 1887 legislative session, but Governor Louis K. Church vetoed the bill for financial reasons and statewide lack of support; it took a few more decades for the school to become a reality.

In 1900 Aberdeen had the fastest-growing population in northern South Dakota and advocates for school began to organize in greater numbers. On January 7, 1899, state legislator James Marshall Lawson, often considered the father of the Northern Normal and Industrial School, proposed a bill to create the school in Aberdeen; the bill went through many revisions. On March 2, 1899, the new school existed on paper, but both a site and funding were still needed.

Wealthy Aberdonians quickly responded by donating land for the school; the Aberdeen City Council created a committee of 25 to choose the site. The committee comprised well-to-do citizens of Aberdeen, including Lawson, Ira Barnes, W.F.T. Bushnell, C.F. Easton, F.W. Brooks, Ed Askew, B.C. Lamont, William Tennant, W.G. Bickellhaupt, and Andrew Melgaard. The committee met through most of early 1899 and adjourned in late spring before making a decision. By late 1899 Governor Andrew E. Lee chose the land just south of city limits donated by Melgaard, but the northern border of Melgaard's land did not extend all the way to Twelfth Avenue, as Lee wanted; the land between Melgaard's northern border and Twelfth Avenue was owned by D.C. and W.R. Thomas of Watertown. In order for the state to receive the land, the committee had to pay Melgaard and the Thomases for it. On November 10, the Thomases sold the two half-blocks in question to the state for one dollar and Melgaard received $1,300 for his 20-acre (8.1 ha) plot. The state was left to fund the school's construction. The school was established on the intersection of the southern and eastern branches of the Milwaukee Railroad.

On March 6, 1901, Governor Herreid approved $28,000 for the construction, and an additional $2,000 for the building of a heating plant. Under the Board of Regents' supervision, the construction was to be completed and ready for students by September 1, 1902. Additional funding was allotted in another legislative bill for salaries, lights, fuel, furniture, and maintenance.

The first president of the Northern Normal and Industrial School, Charles F. Koehler, opened it with the purpose of giving students an education in academic studies. The initial admission requirements were simple: the applicant must be at least 14 and have a desire to teach. Students entering the school with a high school diploma were placed into a one-year "High School Course" that prepared them to teach; students who had completed at least eighth grade entered into either a four-year "English Course" or "Latin Course", and there was great flexibility in the rules so that students could receive credit for the high school they completed even if they had no diploma. In addition to the Normal programs and Industrial programs, there was a Model School; it included children in grades one through four and gave potential teachers the opportunity to learn practical teaching methods and attitudes.

The Northern Normal and Industrial School spent the next decade and a half modifying and defining its mission. The school saw changes in both policies and practices, as well as on campus, with the addition and destruction of buildings. It also experienced many unique events in its early years. A proud moment came on October 23, 1911, when President William Howard Taft gave a speech, combining foreign policy issues with the role of the Normal school, in the newly completed auditorium of the Administration Building.

Good times for the school and country came to an abrupt halt in April 1917 when the United States declared war with Germany and entered World War I. Students responded immediately to the war effort and celebrated "Loyalty Day" on April 19, 1917. The school was closed for the day as students marched down the streets singing patriotic songs and waving flags. The faculty showed its patriotism by instituting a rule that any young man who requested a "school release" to fight overseas would be graduated; faculty members such as football Coach Strum, Professor Gillis, and Professor Stech joined the military. The school newspaper, The Exponent, began publishing letters from former students who had been sent to the war front and gave the first glimpse into the hardships of war; the first letter to arrive at NNIS came from junior T. Otway Thomas:

While bombs are to be dodged, shrapnel to be watched, and rifle bullets guarded against, the war-weary warrior thinks of home ... There is more discussion of home than anything else when two pals get together ... It is food for their friendship and if you could open a soldier's heart, you would find the pictures of his sweetheart, mother, father, sister, or brothers and children. His is the pride of love and affection, the feeling of deep and unexpressed worry over the loved ones at home and the hope for a safe and triumphant return to where he feels his heart would dwell in peace ... How his very nature becomes imbued with the idea of one more being in the society of his loved ones! ... He doesn't talk of it in any quick and slighting way, but becomes a devout convert to the Godly essence in human-kind Love. As love is far away, his thoughts are expressed on paper ... And then when life becomes darkened and gets dim, like a drowning man he clings to what he trusts, and that is Love, a longing to see his home before Death overtakes him. And how he tenaciously holds on to the last thread of life, only to life and experience those joyous sensations on the point of being snatched from him! ... But alas! The poor fellow who has no such luck, but on whose face creeps slowly and surely the paleness of Death, the gradual knowledge that the Light of Life is fast waning and soon shall dawn a new light; but e'er it shines, a faint prayer is whispered: "God bless those at home!"

The end of the war brought great relief to the country and students at NNIS; classes returned to normal, students were no longer sewing, knitting, or making bandages, students sent overseas were slowly returning and the flow of letters was dwindling; however, of the 442 students, alumni, and instructors who were sent overseas, 13 never returned; their names have been engraved on a plaque, "Lest we forget the sacrifice made by these men that liberty and equality might not perish from the earth."

The end of the war also brought a drastic decline in the number of teachers in rural South Dakota. The state responded by creating Normal departments in four-year high schools. This new policy proved to be troublesome for NNIS, because it was no longer necessary to attend the school in order to teach in South Dakota. In response to the decline in enrollment, President Harold Foght pushed to professionalize the teaching occupation, making it necessary to be certified to teach. The headline of the April 1920 issue of the Exponent read, "NNIS To Become Teacher's College", making Foght's effort successful. The school was then reorganized into three divisions: pre-normal, junior-normal, and senior-normal; each division would have its own dean. NNIS could now award baccalaureate degrees, but not until 1939 did the state legislature change the school's name from Northern Normal and Industrial School to Northern State Teachers College.

The Great Depression had left the school in debt, enrollment numbers were dropping and the world was entering into yet another war. Noah E. Steele was the president from 1939 until 1951; he increased enrollment numbers, constructed new additions to the campus, and helped the school get through World War II. The school had experienced many changes during the war: it now offered a flight and ground pilot program to train future military pilots, established a defense school, and also began to offer basic engineering programs. In response to NSTC's changing size and programs, in 1964 the state legislature changed its name to Northern State College. For the next two decades, Northern State College continued to improve its quality of education and make drastic changes to its campus. In 1987 it received the second-highest classification from the Carnegie Commission granted to any South Dakota college or university: Comprehensive I Institution. On February 6, 1989, the state recognized this achievement and changed the name for the final time, from Northern State College to Northern State University.

== Athletics ==
The Northern State Wolves compete in 13 inter-collegiate sports. The athletic program began in 1902 with men's basketball, track and American football followed in 1903, and baseball in 1904. Northern State has had two national championships in women's basketball which occurred in 1992 and 1994. Today, Northern offers men's and women's cross country, men's and women's basketball, men's and women's indoor and outdoor track, women's soccer, women's fastpitch softball, volleyball, American football, wrestling, baseball, and women's swimming.

Northern State is a member of the Northern Sun Intercollegiate Conference (NSIC), which consists of sixteen universities in five states: Bemidji State University (MN); Concordia University St. Paul (MN); University of Minnesota-Crookston; Minnesota State University Moorhead; University of Mary (ND); Northern State University (SD); Southwest Minnesota State University; Upper Iowa University; Wayne State College (NE); Winona State University (MN); University of Minnesota-Duluth; Augustana University (SD); Minnesota State University, Mankato; St. Cloud State University (MN); Minot State University (ND); and University of Sioux Falls (SD). Northern State has been a member of the conference since 1978 and has the second smallest enrollment of the 16 member schools. In the 1990s, all members of the NSIC became members of NCAA Division II, after spending many years with dual membership with the NAIA.

== Campus ==
Undergraduate demographics as of Fall 2023
Race and ethnicity	Total
White	80%
Hispanic	5%
Black	4%
Two or more races	4%
American Indian/Alaska Native	2%
Asian	2%
International student	2%
Economic diversity
Low-income (Note: The percentage of students who received an income-based federal Pell grant intended for low-income students.)	28%
Affluent (Note: The percentage of students who are a part of the American middle class at the bare minimum.)	72%

Northern State's campus occupies 66 acres on the south side of Aberdeen. The oldest buildings on campus were built on the green, and the campus has expanded outward since. The buildings where most classes meet are the H.P. Gerber Building, which houses the offices and classrooms for the School of Education, the Johnson Fine Arts Center, home of the fine arts department and many level classes, and the Mewaldt-Jensen building, which has 16 classrooms, 13 laboratories, and 60 offices that house the mathematics, science, and business departments.

The oldest buildings on Northern's campus are Lincoln, Krikac, and Spafford. Spafford had the first gymnasium. Lincoln was the first residence hall but is now known as the office of business.

The residence halls are Great Plains West, Great Plains East, Briscoe Hall, Kramer Hall, Wolves Memorial Suites, McArthur-Welsh Hall, and Steele Hall. Accommodations include single rooms, double rooms, and numerous suites, which include a bathroom and a living room. Great Plains East also features a Papa John's and a POD (provisions on demand) store.

The Avera Student Center houses the Wolves Den dining hall, the Wolf Shoppe (campus bookstore), a Caribou Coffee/Einstein Bros. Bagels, the campus post office, and all student-related services, as well as several meeting rooms. It also houses offices including NSU Admissions, Student Affairs, the Counseling Center, Disability Services, and Avera Health Services. The Beulah Williams Library has several group study rooms, multimedia stations, NSU Archives, and an extensive collection of books.

A 128,000-square-foot (11,900 m^{2}) athletic complex, the Joseph H. Barnett Physical Education and Convocation Center, was completed in 1987 and houses the coaches' offices and several classrooms. Wachs Arena is named after 30-year Wolves basketball coach Bob Wachs, who won 532 games in his career from 1955 to 1985. The basketball court is named the Don Meyer Court, after Coach Don Meyer.

The Harvey C. Jewett IV Regional Science Education Center is home to the biology and chemistry departments. With state-of-the-art labs and equipment, this two-story facility is enhancing science education and undergraduate research on campus while offering community outreach opportunities to K-12 students around the area. With its prominent placement at the corner of Twelfth Avenue Southeast and South State Street, it also serves as a gateway to campus, with a wolf statue in front of the building.

The NSU Regional Sports Complex, opening in fall 2021, will connect to the existing Barnett Center. The complex will include the new Dacotah Bank Stadium, which will be home to NSU Wolves Football, and Koehler Hall of Fame Softball Field, which will be home to NSU Wolves Softball.

== Notable alumni ==
- Tillie Black Bear, domestic violence activist
- Ronnie Cruz, professional football player
- Paul Sather, college basketball coach
- Elmer Diedtrich, South Dakota businessman and legislator
- Cecil E. Harris, United States Navy aviator
- Sarah and Jennifer Hart, perpetrators of the Hart family murders
- Jim Hundstad, South Dakota politician
- Ronald Leighty, South Dakota politician
- Dakotah Lindwurm, professional runner
- Travis Lutter, professional mixed martial artist
- Joe Robbie, original owner of the Miami Dolphins professional football team
- Kay Schallenkamp, president of Emporia State University and later Black Hills State University
- David Sigdestad, member of South Dakota House of Representatives
- Floyd Westerman, Dakota Sioux musician, political activist, and actor
- Benjamin Victor, sculptor
- Sundance Wicks, college basketball coach
