= South Dakota's 10th legislative district =

American legislative district

South Dakota's 10th State Senate district

South Dakota's 10th legislative district is one of 35 districts in the South Dakota Legislature. Each district is represented by 1 senator and 2 representatives. In the Senate, It has been represented by Democratic Elizabeth Larson since 2023, and in the House, it has been represented by Democrats Erin Healy and Kameron Nelson since 2023.

== Geography ==
The district is located entirely in Minnehaha County in South Dakota's largest city, Sioux Falls. Previously a reliably Republican district, after the 2020 redistricting cycle moved the district from the suburbs to downtown Sioux Falls, it elected Democrats to the legislature for the first time in decades in 2022.

== Recent election results ==
South Dakota legislators are elected to two-year terms, with each permitted to serve a maximum of four consecutive two-year terms. Elections are held every even-numbered year.

=== State senate elections ===
Year	Incumbent	Party	First elected	Result	General election	Primary elections
2022	Margaret Sutton	Republican	2018	Incumbent defeated. Democratic gain.	▌ ✓ Elizabeth Larson (Democratic) 56.7%; ▌ Margaret Sutton (Republican) 43.3%	
2020	Margaret Sutton	Republican	2018	Incumbent re-elected.	▌ ✓ Margaret Sutton (Republican) 62.8%; ▌ Nichole Cauwels (Democratic) 37.2%	
2018	Margaret Sutton	Republican	(appointed)	Incumbent re-elected.	▌ ✓ Margaret Sutton (Republican) 59.6%; ▌ Rachel Willson (Democratic) 40.4%	Republican: ▌ ✓ Margaret Sutton (inc.) 58.9%; ▌ Spencer Wrightsman 41.1%
2016	Jenna Haggar	Republican	2014	Incumbent re-elected.	▌ ✓ Jenna Haggar (Republican) 59.9%; ▌ Jim Powers (Democratic) 40.1%	
2014	Shantel Krebs	Republican	2010	Incumbent retired. Republican hold.	▌ ✓ Jenna Haggar (Republican) 63.0%; ▌ Michael Schultz (Democratic) 37.0%	
2012	Shantel Krebs	Republican	2010	Incumbent re-elected.	▌ ✓ Shantel Krebs (Republican) 61.0%; ▌ Paul Thompson (Democratic) 39.0%	

=== State house elections ===
In 33 of the 35 legislative districts, both representatives are elected at-large. The top two candidates in each party's primaries will be their respective party's nominees for the general election.

Year	Incumbents	Party	First elected	Result	General election	Primary elections
2022	▌Doug Barthel ▌Steven Haugaard	Republican	2018; 2014	Incumbents re-districted. Democratic gain.	▌ ✓ Erin Healy (Democratic) 32.4%; ▌ ✓ Kameron Nelson (Democratic) 24.7%; ▌ John Mogen (Republican) 21.9%; ▌ Tom Sutton (Republican) 21.0%	
2020	▌Doug Barthel ▌Steven Haugaard	Republican	2018; 2014	Incumbents re-elected.	▌ ✓ Steven Haugaard (Republican) 37.4%; ▌ ✓ Doug Barthel (Republican) 35.5%; ▌ Michelle Hentschel (Democratic) 27.1%	
2018	▌Don Haggar ▌Steven Haugaard	Republican	2012; 2014	Incumbent retired. Incumbent re-elected. Republican hold.	▌ ✓ Doug Barthel (Republican) 31.3%; ▌ ✓ Steven Haugaard (Republican) 30.8%; ▌ Barbara Saxton (Democratic) 19.0%; ▌ Dean Kurtz (Democratic) 18.85	
2016	▌Don Haggar ▌Steven Haugaard	Republican	2012; 2014	Incumbents re-elected.	▌ ✓ Steven Haugaard (Republican) 32.36%; ▌ ✓ Don Haggar (Republican) 30.40%; ▌ Paul Vanderlinde (Democratic) 19.05%; ▌ Dean Kurtz (Democratic) 18.20%	
2014	▌Don Haggar ▌Jenna Haggar	Republican	2012; 2010	Incumbent re-elected. Incumbent retired. Republican hold.	▌ ✓ Don Haggar (Republican) 32.8%; ▌ ✓ Steven Haugaard (Republican) 31.0%; ▌ Jo Hausman (Democratic) 20.9%; ▌ James Wrigg (Democratic) 15.4%	
2012	▌Jenna Haggar ▌Roger Hunt	Republican	2010; 2004	Incumbent re-elected. Incumbent retired. Republican hold.	▌ ✓ Jenna Haggar (Republican) 31.5%; ▌ ✓ Don Haggar (Republican) 27.4%; ▌ Jo Hausman (Democratic) 23.5%; ▌ Brian Parsons (Democratic) 17.7%	Republican: ▌ ✓ Jenna Haggar (inc.) 42.7%; ▌ ✓ Don Haggar 31.3%; ▌ Dave Munson 26.0%
