= Roland Van Gerpen =

American politician and farmer (1926–1983)

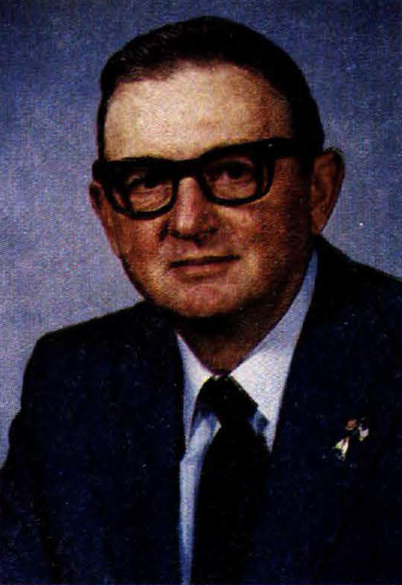
- Official portrait, c. 1983

Member of the South Dakota House of Representatives
- In office January 6, 1981 – July 13, 1983
- Preceded by: Ralph Nachtigal
- Succeeded by: Louise Van Gerpen
- Constituency: 14th district (1983); 16th district (1981–1983)

Personal details
- Born: Roland W. Van Gerpen; August 3, 1926 Avon, South Dakota, U.S.
- Died: July 13, 1983 (aged 56) Sioux Falls, South Dakota, U.S.
- Party: Republican
- Spouse: Louise Dykstra (m. 1947)
- Children: 3, including Bill
- Relatives: Harlan Van Gerpen (brother); Herman W. Van Gerpen (grandfather); Edward Van Gerpen (cousin)

Roland W. Van Gerpen (August 3, 1926 – July 13, 1983) was an American politician and farmer from South Dakota. Born in Avon, he briefly served in the United States Air Force for one year after graduating high school. Van Gerpen served on the Avon Independent School Board from 1965 to 1975, and was its chairman from 1970 to 1975. He was also a member of the Bon Homme County School Board from 1965 to 1968. Van Gerpen was elected to the South Dakota House of Representatives in 1980 as a member of the Republican Party, narrowly defeating incumbent Ralph Nachtigal by 13 votes. Van Gerpen was re-elected in 1982, although he died on July 13, 1983, before his term ended. His wife, Louise Van Gerpen, was appointed as his successor by governor Bill Janklow in October 1983.

== Life and career ==
Roland W. Van Gerpen was born on August 3, 1926, in Avon, South Dakota, to William R. and Johanna (née DeRoos) Van Gerpen. His grandfather, Herman W. Van Gerpen, served in the South Dakota House of Representatives from 1922 to 1924. Roland's brother Harlan Van Gerpen served in the Iowa Legislature, and Roland's cousin Edward Van Gerpen served in the South Dakota Legislature. Roland graduated from Avon High School in 1944 and then began serving in the United States Air Force in 1945. After retiring the following year, he became a farmer. Roland married Louise Dykstra on March 26, 1947, at the Avon Baptist Church; together, they had three children: Bill, Danny, and Lorney.

In 1965, Van Gerpen began serving on the Avon Independent School Board and the Bon Homme County School Board, retiring from the latter in 1968. He was selected as the chairman of the Avon Independent School Board in 1970 and served in the position and on the board until 1975. In September 1967, Van Gerpen was elected as an assistant instructor for Bible classes at the First Baptist Sunday School in Avon. The following year, he was selected as a teacher. He was last elected to the position in 1970. He was a member of the South Dakota Republican Party Central Committee in 1977. He served as chairman of Bon Homme County from 1978 to 1980. In June 1980, Van Gerpen was appointed to the South Dakota–Nebraska Boundary Commission by Bill Janklow, the governor of South Dakota.

By April 1980, Van Gerpen had filed to run as a candidate in that year's election to the South Dakota House of Representatives, seeking to represent the 16th district for the Republican Party. In the Republican primary, held in June, Van Gerpen and Kenneth E. Kredit defeated Martin E. Drefs to become the Republican nominees. Van Gerpen went on to win the general election, alongside Democrat Albert Kocer. Official canvass results showed Van Gerpen defeating incumbent Ralph Nachtigal by 13 votes. Nachtigal successfully petitioned for a recount, but conceded the election after unofficial recount results widened the vote margin to 86. Van Gerpen was inaugurated, alongside the rest of the 56th South Dakota Legislature, on January 6, 1981. He was appointed to the local government committee. In January 1981, Van Gerpen, alongside eight other Republican representatives, reversed their vote on a bill that would have held statewide elections for the South Dakota agricultural commissioner. Their reversal caused the bill to die in the House. Van Gerpen was one of nine legislators to not sponsor any bills in the 1982 session of the legislature. Van Gerpen announced his re-election campaign in April 1982 for the 14th district after redistricting was held. He won the Republican primary and later the general election, both alongside Terry Miller.

On July 13, 1983, while serving his second term in the House, Van Gerpen died at a hospital in Sioux Falls after suffering a heart attack the previous night. His funeral was held at the First Baptist Church in Avon on July 16. On October 4, his wife Louise was appointed as his successor by Governor Janklow.

== Electoral history ==
1980 South Dakota House of Representatives 16th district Republican primary election
Party	Candidate	Votes	%
Republican	Roland Van Gerpen	1,934	41.37%
Republican	Kenneth Kredit	1,812	38.76%
Republican	Martin E. Drefs	929	19.87%
Total votes		4,675	100.00%

1980 South Dakota House of Representatives 16th district general election
Party	Candidate	Votes	%
Democratic	Albert Kocer (incumbent)	5,008	29.13%
Republican	Roland Van Gerpen	4,162	24.21%
Democratic	Ralph Nachtigal (incumbent)	4,149	24.13%
Republican	Kenneth Kredit	3,873	22.53%
Total votes		17,192	100.00%

1982 South Dakota House of Representatives 14th district Republican primary election
Party	Candidate	Votes	%
Republican	Terry Miller (incumbent)	2,644	45.25%
Republican	Roland Van Gerpen (incumbent)	2,325	39.79%
Republican	Phil Trieb	874	14.96%
Total votes		5,843	100.00%

1982 South Dakota House of Representatives 14th district general election
Party	Candidate	Votes	%
Republican	Roland Van Gerpen (incumbent)	5,966	38.15%
Republican	Terry Miller (incumbent)	5,640	36.07%
Democratic	Paul E. Zeeb	4,032	25.78%
Total votes		15,638	100.00%
