= Patrick Kirschman =

American politician (1954–2020)

Member of the South Dakota House of Representatives from the 15th district
- In office January 2009 – January 2017 Serving with Martha Vanderlinde(2009–2011); Jenna Haggar (2011–2013); Karen Soli (2013–2017)

Personal details
- Born: November 3, 1954 (age 71) Sioux Falls, South Dakota
- Died: March 19, 2020 (aged 65) Sioux Falls, South Dakota
- Party: Democratic
- Education: South Dakota State University

Patrick Allan Kirschman (November 3, 1954 – March 19, 2020) was an American politician and a Democratic member of the South Dakota House of Representatives who represented District 15 from 2009 to 2017.

== Personal life ==
Kirschman was born in Sioux Falls, South Dakota, on November 3, 1954, to parents Robert and Rita Kirschman. He earned his BS from South Dakota State University in 1978. Kirschman was a baker for Metz Baking. He died in Sioux Falls on March 19, 2020. Flags at the South Dakota State Capitol were flown at half staff on March 26, 2020, to commemorate Kirschman.

== Elections ==
- 2008 When District 15 incumbent Democratic Representatives Kathy Miles ran for South Dakota Senate and Mary Glenski was term limited and both seats were left open, Kirschman ran in the three-way June 3, 2008, Democratic Primary and placed second with 682 votes (27.3%); in the three-way November 4, 2008, General election Kirschman took the first seat with 3,132 votes (36.8%) ahead of Republican nominee Tamara Weis, who had run for Senate in 2006.
- 2010 Kirschman and incumbent Republican Representative Vanderlinde were unopposed for the June 8, 2010, Democratic Primary, but were challenged in the three-way November 2, 2010, General election, where Independent candidate Jenna Haggar took the first seat and Kirschman took the second seat with 1,858 votes (31.6%) ahead of incumbent Representative Vanderlinde.
- 2012 With District 15 incumbent Representative Jenna Haggar redistricted to District 10, and incumbent Democratic Representative Mitch Fargen redistricted from District 8, Kirschman ran in the three-way June 5, 2012, Democratic Primary, and placed second with 361 votes (34.0%); Kirschman and fellow Democratic nominee Karen Soli were unopposed for the November 6, 2012, General election, where Soli took the first seat and Kirschman took the second seat with 2,498 votes (45.22%).
- 2014 With District 15 incumbent Representative Kirschman ran unopposed in the June 3, 2014, Democratic Primary, Kirschman and fellow Democratic nominee Karen Soli were unopposed for the November 4, 2014, General election, where Soli took the first seat and Kirschman took the second seat with 1,476 votes.
- 2016 District 15 term limited incumbent Representative Kirschman ran in the June 7, 2016, two way Democratic Primary for State Senate, losing to Reynold F. Nesiba 697 votes to Kirschman's 533 votes.
