= Van Gerpen =

Van Gerpen is a surname. Notable people with the surname include:

- Bill Van Gerpen (born 1949), American politician from South Dakota
- Edward Van Gerpen (born 1938), American politician from South Dakota
- Harlan Van Gerpen (1924–2012), American politician from Iowa
- Roland Van Gerpen (1926–1983), American politician from South Dakota
