= Don Haggar =

American politician

Speaker pro tempore of the South Dakota House of Representatives
- In office January 10, 2017 – June 27, 2017
- Preceded by: Mark Mickelson
- Succeeded by: Steven Haugaard

Member of the South Dakota House of Representatives from the 10th district
- In office January 11, 2013 – June 27, 2017
- Preceded by: Roger W. Hunt
- Succeeded by: Doug Barthel

Personal details
- Born: August 6, 1957 (age 69)
- Party: Republican
- Education: University of South Dakota (MBA)
- Website: Campaign website

Don K. Haggar (born August 6, 1957) is an American politician and a former Republican member of the South Dakota House of Representatives representing District 10 from January 11, 2013, to June 27, 2017. He resigned on 27 June 2017 to become the leader of the South Dakota chapter of Americans for Prosperity.

== Education and personal life ==
Haggar earned his MBA from the University of South Dakota. He is the father of politician Jenna Netherton.

== Election history ==
- 2016 Haggar was re-elected with 5,484 votes; Steven Haugaard was re-elected with 5,838 and Paul Vanderline received 3,437 votes and Dean Kurtz received 3,283 votes.
- 2014 Haggar was re-elected with 3,774 votes; Steven Haugaard was also elected with 3,574 votes; and Jo Hausman received 2,402 votes and James Wrigg received 1,769 votes.
- 2012 With District 10 incumbent Republican Representative Gene G. Abdallah running to return to the South Dakota Senate and Roger Hunt term limited and leaving both District 10 seats open, and incumbent Republican Representative Jenna Haggar redistricted from District 15, Haggar ran alongside his daughter in the three-way June 5, 2012 Republican Primary, where she placed first and he placed second with 457 votes (31.3%) ahead of former state Senator Dave Munson; in the four-way November 6, 2012 General election, she took the first seat and he took the second seat with 4,620 votes (27.37%) ahead of Democratic nominees Jo Hausman and Brian Parsons.

South Dakota House of Representatives
Preceded by Mark Mickelson	Speaker pro tempore of South Dakota House of Representatives; 2017	Succeeded by Steven Haugaard
