= Stace Nelson =

American politician

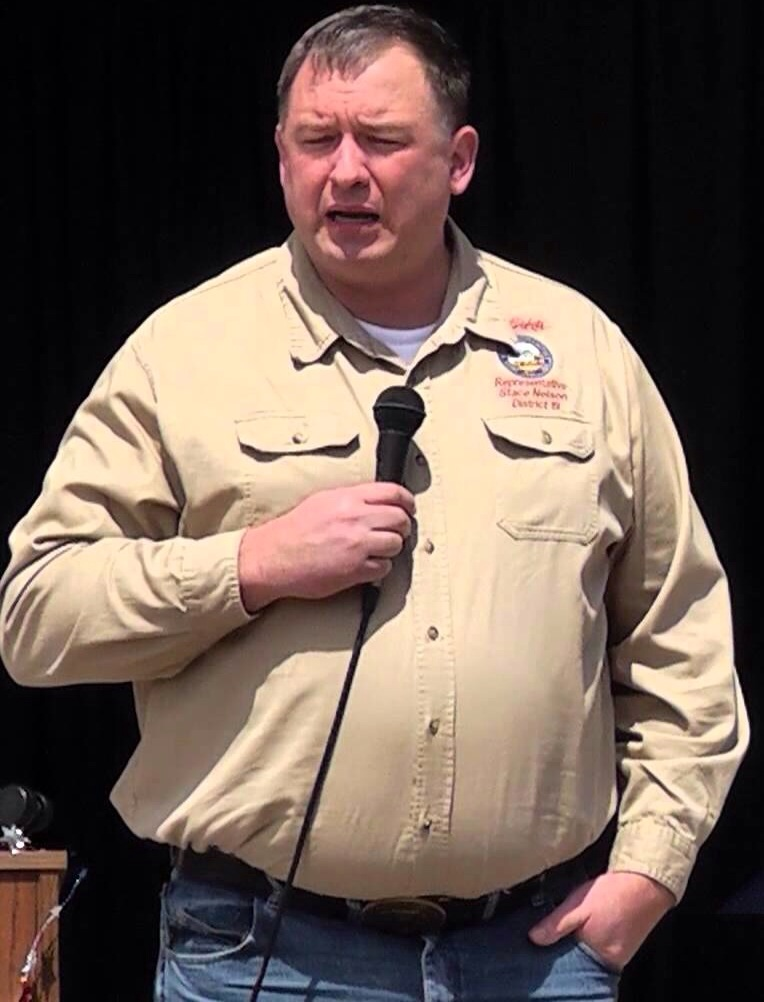

Member of the South Dakota Senate from the 19th district
- In office 2016–2020
- Preceded by: Bill Van Gerpen
- Succeeded by: Kyle Schoenfish

Member of the South Dakota House of Representatives from the 19th district
- In office 2012–2014 Serving with Kyle Schoenfish
- Preceded by: Edward Van Gerpen, Frank Kloucek
- Succeeded by: Kent Peterson, Kyle Schoenfish

Member of the South Dakota House of Representatives from the 25th district
- In office 2010–2012 Serving with Jon Hansen
- Preceded by: Oran Sorenson, Dennis Van Overschelde
- Succeeded by: Scott Ecklund, Jon Hansen

Personal details
- Born: May 2, 1967 (age 59) Sioux Falls, South Dakota, U.S.
- Party: Republican
- Education: Excelsior University

Stacey "Stace" Nelson is an American politician, law enforcement officer, and retired Naval Criminal Investigative Service special agent who served as a member of both chambers of the South Dakota Legislature. On November 17, 2019, Nelson announced that he would be retiring from politics, effective December 10, 2019.

== Career ==
=== Law enforcement and military ===
Nelson served in the United States Marine Corps as a military policeman, marksmanship instructor, and criminal investigator. He worked as a Naval Investigative Service Special Agent, then as a Naval Criminal Investigative Service (NCIS) special agent, and ultimately retired as an NCIS investigator in 2009. His final assignments included working out of the NCIS Force Protection Detachment in the Embassy of the United States, Manila, and out of the NCIS Far East Field Office in Yokosuka. During his time as an NCIS agent, he worked on hundreds of cases involving military sexual assault, and was featured in the Oscar-nominated documentary The Invisible War, advocating for the reform of how the military handles sexual assault claims.

=== Politics ===
==== 2010 State House of Representatives ====
Nelson was elected to the South Dakota House of Representatives in 2010. He served on the Judiciary Committee and the Local Government Committee.

==== 2014 U.S. Senate campaign ====
Nelson ran for a U.S. Senate seat in South Dakota in 2014, describing himself as "probably the most conservative elected official in the state of South Dakota, and...probably the least partisan." He received 17.69% of the primary vote, coming in third in the race behind State Representative Larry Rhoden (18.25%) and former Governor Mike Rounds who won the nomination with 55.5% of the vote. Annette Bosworth came in 4th with 5.75%, and Jason Ravnsborg came in 5th with 2.77%.

==== 2016 State Senate Campaign ====
In the 2016 Republican Primary, Nelson defeated his Republican primary opponent, Caleb Finck, on a vote of 58% to 42% after running a race where the Sunday before the election, Nelson recorded an automated telephone call which accused his opponent of wearing women's undergarments. Nelson went on to win the general election against Democrat Russell Graeff with 78.2% of the vote.

==== 2018 GOP convention ====
At the 2018 South Dakota Republican Party Convention in Pierre, South Dakota, Nelson received a floor nomination for consideration as the party nominee for Lieutenant Governor after Congresswoman Kristi Noem publicly declared former Democrat Larry Rhoden as her running mate. During Senator Nelson's subsequent speech he pointed out he was not running for the position and encouraged delegates to return the GOP back to its moral compass. Senator Nelson received 24.3% of the delegate vote and 22% of the weighted vote.

== Controversies ==
=== Threat toward another lawmaker ===
In January 2012, Nelson got in a heated argument with State Representative Nick Moser of Yankton after a heated debate on the House floor. As a result, Speaker of the House Valentine Rausch moved Nelson's seat in the legislature, and the incident was cited as one of the reasons Nelson was removed from the Republican Caucus for a period of time. In removing Nelson from the caucus, House Majority Leader David Lust stated "I am not going to condone the conduct he engaged in toward another member of the Legislature very publicly. It's just not acceptable."

=== Robocall controversy ===
In 2013 Stace Nelson was named as an unindicted co-conspirator in a case where the State of South Dakota prosecuted Dan Willard for political robodialed phone calls that were made without a disclaimer. He was later added to a civil lawsuit filed by the political action committee Rushmore PAC over the matter. On June 11, 2018, Second Circuit Court Judge Mark Salter dismissed the six-year-old case with prejudice after the former lawmaker who filed it failed to keep the case going. "This case is stale and focuses upon conduct alleged to have occurred prior to the 2012 general election," Second Circuit Court Judge Mark Salter wrote. "The lack of action is unreasonable and unexplained."

=== Facebook blocking lawsuit ===
In December 2019, Jeff Church of Vermillion, South Dakota filed a lawsuit against Nelson in United States District Court for the District of South Dakota, alleging that Nelson violated his civil rights and the 14th Amendment, as well as his First Amendment right of free speech and right to petition the government for a redress of grievances by blocking him on his public Facebook page. Church alleged in the lawsuit that Nelson would not let him challenge the Senator's “misinformed and inaccurate statements.”

== Personal life ==
Nelson lives with his wife, Aiza, in Fulton, South Dakota. They have six children.
