= Louise Van Gerpen =

American farmer and politician (1926–2018)

Member of the South Dakota House of Representatives from the 14th district
- In office October 4, 1983 – January 8, 1985
- Preceded by: Roland Van Gerpen
- Succeeded by: Ann M. Lewis; Janice K. Nicolay

Personal details
- Born: Louise Irene Dykstra; February 9, 1926 Tyndall, South Dakota, U.S.
- Died: November 13, 2015 (aged 89) Tyndall, South Dakota, U.S.
- Party: Republican
- Spouse: Roland Van Gerpen (m. 1947; died 1983)
- Children: 3, including Bill

Louise Irene Van Gerpen (née Dykstra; February 9, 1926 – November 13, 2015) was an American farmer and politician from South Dakota. Born in Tyndall, she grew up across Avon and attended the University of South Dakota–Springfield. She married Roland Van Gerpen in March 1947, who later became a member of the South Dakota House of Representatives. Following his death in June 1983, she was appointed to fill his seat in the House on October 4. She served the remainder of his term, opting not to run for re-election. While in the House, she advocated against then-governor Bill Janklow's plan to convert the University of South Dakota–Springfield to a prison. Van Gerpen died in Tyndall on November 13, 2015; governor Dennis Daugaard ordered flags at the state capitol to be flown at half-staff the day of her funeral on November 17.

== Life and career ==
Louise Irene Dykstra was born on February 9, 1926, in Tyndall, South Dakota, to Louis J. and Ida M. (née Oorlog) Dykstra. Van Gerpen grew up as a Presbyterianist with 7 siblings across Avon. She graduated from Avon High School in 1944 and was a student of the University of South Dakota–Springfield. Van Gerpen married Roland Van Gerpen on March 26, 1947. Together, they had three children: Bill, Danny, and Lorney. Bill later became a member of the South Dakota Legislature, serving in both the Senate and House of Representatives. Following her marriage, she joined the First Baptist Church of Avon and was baptized on May 27, 1951. The two worked as farmers at their ranch in Avon.

On July 13, 1983, Roland, while serving his second term in the South Dakota House of Representatives representing the 14th district, died in Sioux Falls from a heart attack. When offered by governor Bill Janklow to fill her husband's seat, Van Gerpen originally was not interested in filling her husband's seat. However, after encouragement from legislators, she decided to accept his offer, and on October 4, Van Gerpen was appointed by Janklow as Roland's successor in the House. As a member of the House, Van Gerpen served on the local government and taxation committees. She vehemently opposed Janklow's plan to convert the University of South Dakota–Springfield to a minimum security prison, calling the university "a beautiful school." Van Gerpen gave her first speech in the House on February 22, 1984, during a debate on Janklow's plan, advocating against it. Although the House voted against the plan in a 31–35 vote, 10 members switched their votes, allowing the plan to be discussed again in the House. The following month, Van Gerpen praised the university's sale to National College, a private school system in Rapid City. In April, Van Gerpen announced that she would not seek a full term in the House. Her term expired on January 8, 1985, upon the inauguration of the 60th South Dakota Legislature. She was succeeded by Ann M. Lewis and Janice K. Nicolay.

In October 2011, Van Gerpen moved to the Good Samaritan Society, a nursing home in Tyndall, due to declining health. She died there on November 13, 2015, at the age of 89. Governor Dennis Daugaard ordered all flags at the state capitol to be flown at half-staff the day of her funeral, which was held on November 17.
