= Karen Soli =

American politician (1948–2025)

Member of the South Dakota House of Representatives from the 15th district
- Incumbent
- Assumed office January 11, 2013 Serving with Patrick Kirschman
- Preceded by: Jenna Haggar

Personal details
- Born: July 15, 1948
- Died: September 6, 2025 (aged 77) Sioux Falls, South Dakota, U.S.
- Party: Democratic
- Education: St. Olaf College; Lutheran Theological Seminary

Karen L. Soli (July 15, 1948 – September 6, 2025) was an American politician who was a Democratic member of the South Dakota House of Representatives representing District 15 from January 11, 2013 until her death on September 6, 2025.

== Early life and education ==
Soli was born on July 15, 1948. She earned her BA from St. Olaf College and her M.Div. from Lutheran Theological Seminary.

== Elections ==
- 2012 With District 15 incumbent Independent Representative Jenna Haggar redistricted to District 10, and incumbent Democratic Representative Mitch Fargen redistricted from District 8, Soli and incumbent Democratic Representative Patrick Kirschman ran in the three-way June 5, 2012 Democratic Primary, and placed first with 386 votes (36.4%); Soli and Representative Kirschman were unopposed for the November 6, 2012 General election, where Soli took the first seat with 3,026 votes (54.78%) and Representative Kirschman took the second seat.

== Death ==
Soli died in Sioux Falls on September 6, 2025, at the age of 77.
