= Thomas Brunner (disambiguation) =

Thomas Brunner (1821–1874) was an English-born surveyor and explorer in New Zealand.

Thomas Brunner may also refer to:

- Thomas Brunner (footballer) (born 1962), German footballer and coach
- Thomas J. Brunner (born 1958), South Dakota politician
- Thomas Brunner (Swiss politician) (1960–2025), Green Liberal politician
- Tommy Brunner (1970–2006), Austrian snowboarder
