= Tim Walburg =

American politician

Member of the South Dakota House of Representatives from the 8th district
- Incumbent
- Assumed office January 14, 2025 Serving with Tim Reisch

Personal details
- Born: March 12, 1974 (age 52)
- Party: Republican

Tim Walburg (born March 12, 1974) is an American politician. He serves as a Republican member for the 8th district in the South Dakota House of Representatives since 2025. His district is located in the eastern part of the state and includes the city of Madison. Walburg is a retired Lake County Sheriff. He and his wife have two children.
