= Martha Vanderlinde =

American politician

Member of the South Dakota House of Representatives from the 15th district
- In office January 13, 2009 – January 11, 2011
- Preceded by: Mary Glenski; Kathy Miles
- Succeeded by: Jenna Netherton

Personal details
- Born: July 11, 1951 (age 75) Sioux Falls, South Dakota
- Party: Democratic

Martha Vanderlinde (born July 11, 1951) is an American politician who served in the South Dakota House of Representatives from the 15th district from 2009 to 2011.
