= Leslie Heinemann =

American politician

Member of the South Dakota House of Representatives from the 8th district
- Incumbent
- Assumed office January 11, 2013 Serving with Scott Parsley

Personal details
- Born: January 5, 1955 (age 71) Flandreau, South Dakota
- Party: Republican
- Profession: Dentist
- Website: leslieheinemann.com

Leslie James Heinemann (born January 5, 1955) is an American politician and a Republican member of the South Dakota House of Representatives representing District 8 since January 11, 2013.

== Elections ==
- 2012 With District 8 incumbent Democratic Representative Mitch Fargen redistricted to District 15 and leaving a seat open, Heinemann ran in the June 5, 2012 Republican Primary; in the four-way November 6, 2012 General election, Democratic nominee Scott Parsley took the first seat and Heinemann took the second seat with 5,262 votes (26.43%) ahead of Democratic nominee Roy Lindsey and fellow Republican nominee Gene Kroger (who had been selected to replace incumbent Representative Patricia Stricherz after she withdrew).
- 2024 - elected in 25th district.
