= Hal Wick =

American politician (1944–2018)

Member of the South Dakota House of Representatives from the 12th district
- In office January 11, 2011 – January 13, 2015 Serving with Manny Steele (2011–2015)
- Preceded by: Blake Curd
- Succeeded by: Arch Beal and Alex Jensen

Member of the South Dakota House of Representatives from the 12th district
- In office January 2001 – January 2009 Serving with Casey Murschel (2001–2007); Manny Steele (2007–2009)
- Succeeded by: Blake Curd

Member of the South Dakota House of Representatives from the 12th district
- In office January 1995 – January 1999 Serving with Dave Munson (1995–1997); Judy Rost (1997–1999)
- Preceded by: Robert Caselli
- Succeeded by: John McIntyre

Member of the South Dakota House of Representatives from the 11th district
- In office January 1977 – January 1981

Personal details
- Born: October 31, 1944 New Ulm, Minnesota
- Died: March 8, 2018 (aged 73) Sioux Falls, South Dakota
- Party: Republican
- Education: South Dakota State University
- Website: halwick.com

Military service
- Branch/service: Iowa Air National Guard (1969–1974); South Dakota Air National Guard (1975–1994)
- Rank: Lieutenant Colonel

Hal G. Wick (October 31, 1944 – March 8, 2018) was an American politician and a Republican member of the South Dakota House of Representatives representing District 12 from January 11, 2011, to January 13, 2015. Wick previously served several non-consecutive terms from January 1977 until January 1981 in District 11, from January 1995 until January 1999 and from January 2001 until January 2009 in the District 12 seat, but ran for South Dakota Senate in 2008 due to the state's term limits.

== Biography ==
Wick was born in New Ulm, Minnesota. He served in the Iowa National Guard and the South Dakota National Guard and was commissioned a lieutenant colonel. Wick earned his BS from South Dakota State University. He worked for Northwestern Airlines as a pilot. Wick died on March 8, 2018.

== Elections ==
- 2012 Wick and Representative Steele were unopposed for the June 5, 2012 Republican Primary; in the four-way November 6, 2012 General election Wick took the first seat with 5,218 votes (27.96%) and Representative Steele took the second seat ahead of Democratic nominees Susan Randall and Mike Knudson.
- 1974 Wick initially sought Legislative office in 11-way 10 slot June 4, 1974 Republican Primary where he placed eighth with 8,500 votes, but lost the 20-way 10 seat November 5, 1974 General election.
- 1976 Wick ran again in the 17-way 10 slot June 1, 1976 Republican Primary, where he placed seventh with 5,331 votes, and was elected in 20-way 10 seat November 2, 1976 General election where he placed sixth with 21,831 votes.
- 1978 Wick ran in the 13-way 10 slot June 6, 1978 Republican Primary where he placed fifth with 6,577 votes, and was re-elected in the 20-way 10 seat November 7, 1978 General election where he placed fifth with 17,663 votes.
- 1980 Wick ran in the 14-way 10 slot June 3, 1980 Republican Primary where he placed eighth with 5,908 votes, but lost the 20-way 10 seat November 4, 1980 General election.
- 1992 Redistricted to District 12 under the new system, to challenge incumbent Democratic Representative Robert Caselli, Wick ran on June 2, 1992, Republican Primary, but lost the November 3, 1992 General election to Representative Caselli and Republican Representative Dave Munson.
- 1994 When incumbent Democratic Representative Caselli left the Legislature and left a District 12 seat open, Wick ran in the four-way June 7, 1994 Republican Primary where he placed second with 1,465 votes (28.47%), in four-way November 8, 1994 General election, Republican Representative Munson took the first seat and Wick took the second seat with 4,119 votes (25.24%) ahead of Democratic nominees John McIntyre and Robert Kirschman, including an election recount that did not change the result.
- 1996 With incumbent Republican Representative Munson running for South Dakota Senate, Wick ran in the three-way Republican Primary and placed first with 1,174 votes (36.16%), in the four-way November 5, 1996 General election, fellow Republican nominee Judy Rost took the first seat and Democratic nominee John McIntyre initially took the second seat, but a recount resulting in a tie was decided by the House for Wick.
- 1998 Wick and Representative Rost were unopposed for the 1998 Republican Primary; in the four-way November 3, 1998 General election, incumbent Republican Representative Rost took the first seat and the second seat was initially a 3,229 vote tie between Wick and his 1996 Democratic challenger John McIntyre, with a recount in McIntyre's favor.
- 2000 When incumbent Democratic Representative McIntyre ran for South Dakota Senate and Representative Rost left the Legislature leaving both District 12 seats open, Wick ran in the 2000 Republican Primary; in the three-way November 7, 2000 General election Wick took the first seat with 4,956 votes (35.48%) and fellow Republican nominee Casey Murschel took the second seat ahead of Democratic nominee Robert Litz.
- 2002 Wick and Representative Murschel were challenged in the three-way June 4, 2002 Republican Primary where Wick placed first with 1,936 votes (42.8%); in the four-way November 5, 2002 General election Wick took the first seat with 4,979 votes (30.27%) and Representative Murschel took the second seat ahead of Democratic nominees Kimberly Jacobson and Robert Thimjon.
- 2004 Wick and Representative Murschel were unopposed for both the June 1, 2004 Republican Primary and the November 2, 2004 General election where Wick took the first seat with 6,619 votes (53.66%) and Representative Murschel took the second seat after two Democratic candidates withdrew.
- 2006 With Representative Murschel leaving the Legislature and leaving a District 12 seat open, Wick ran in the four-way June 6, 2006 Republican Primary and placed first with 931 votes (37.3%); in the five-way November 7, 2006 General election Wick took the first seat with 5,795 votes (33.15%) and fellow Republican nominee Manny Steele took the second seat ahead of Democratic nominees Joe Weis, Gregory Kniffen, and Libertarian candidate John Anderson.
- 2008 Prevented by South Dakota's term limits for running for re-election in the House, to challenge incumbent Democratic Senator Sandy Jerstad for the District's Senate seat, Wick was unopposed for the June 3, 2008 Republican Primary, but lost the November 4, 2008 General election to Senator Jerstad.
- 2010 When incumbent Representative Curd left the Legislature and left a District 12 seat open, Wick ran in the three-way June 8, 2010 Republican Primary and placed first with 1,684 votes (42.0%) and former Representative Murschel placed third; in the four-way November 2, 2010 General election Wick took the first seat with 6,408 votes (33.14%) and Representative Steele took the second seat ahead of Democratic nominees Paula Johnson and Joel Fagerhaug.
