= Senator Putnam =

Senator Putnam may refer to:

- Harvey Putnam (1793–1855), New York State Senate
- Henry Putnam (1846–1913), Wisconsin State Senate
- James E. Putnam (born 1940), South Dakota State Senate
- James O. Putnam (1818–1903), New York State Senate
