= Patricia Stricherz =

American politician

Member of the South Dakota House of Representatives from the 8th district
- In office January 11, 2011 – January 8, 2013
- Preceded by: Gerald F. Lange
- Succeeded by: Leslie Heinemann; Scott Parsley

Personal details
- Born: November 21, 1960 (age 65)
- Party: Republican

Patricia Stricherz (born November 21, 1960) is an American politician who served in the South Dakota House of Representatives from the 8th district from 2011 to 2013.
