= Senator Miles =

Senator Miles may refer to:

- Borris Miles (born 1965), Texas State Senate
- Frederick Miles (1815–1896), Connecticut State Senate
- Kathy Miles (born 1950), South Dakota State Senate
- Steen Miles (1946–2017), Georgia State Senate
- Willard W. Miles (1845–1926), Vermont State Senate

== See also ==
- Vicki Miles-LaGrange (born 1953), Oklahoma State Senate
