= Kameron Nelson =

Kameron Nelson may refer to:

- Kameron Nelson (gymnast) (born 2001), American artistic gymnast
- Kameron Nelson (politician), American politician
