= Southern State College =

Southern State College is the former name of at least two educational institutions in the United States:

- Southern Arkansas University
- University of South Dakota–Springfield
