= Stephanie Arne (politician) =

American politician

Member-elect of the South Dakota House of Representatives from the 12th district
- Assuming office January 2027
- Succeeding: Greg Jamison

Personal details
- Party: Democratic

Stephanie Arne is an American politician. A member of the Democratic Party, she is the member-elect for the 12th district of the South Dakota House of Representatives.
