= Tjeerdsma =

Tjeerdsma is a surname. Notable people with the surname include:

- Jess Tjeerdsma (1907–1977), American politician and farmer
- Mel Tjeerdsma (born 1946), American football coach
