= Steven Westra =

American politician

Steve Westra

Member of the South Dakota House of Representatives from the 13th district
- In office January 11, 2013 – January 10, 2017 Serving with Mark Mickelson
- Preceded by: Susy Blake; Brian Liss
- Succeeded by: Sue Peterson

Personal details
- Born: August 8, 1969 (age 56) Sioux Falls, South Dakota, U.S.
- Party: Republican
- Education: University of South Dakota (BS)
- Website: Official website

Steven Westra (born August 8, 1969) is an American politician and a Republican member of the South Dakota House of Representatives representing District 13 since January 11, 2013.

== Education ==
Westra earned his BS from the University of South Dakota.

== Elections ==
- 2012 When incumbent Representatives Democrat Susy Blake and Republican Brian Liss left the Legislature and left both the District 13 seats open, Westra ran in the three-way June 5, 2012 Republican Primary and placed second with 984 votes; Westra and fellow Republican nominee Mark Mickelson were unopposed for the November 6, 2012 General election, where Mickelson took the first seat and Westra took the second seat with 5,145 votes (41.94%).
