= Amber Arlint =

American politician

Member of the South Dakota House of Representatives from the 12th district
- Incumbent
- Assumed office January 10, 2023 Serving with Greg Jamison
- Preceded by: Arch Beal

Personal details
- Born: March 8, 1987 (age 39)
- Party: Republican
- Education: University of South Dakota

Amber Arlint (born March 8, 1987) is an American politician. She has served as a member of the South Dakota House of Representatives from the 12th district, alongside Greg Jamison, since 2023. She is a member of the Republican Party.
