= Tim Reisch =

American politician

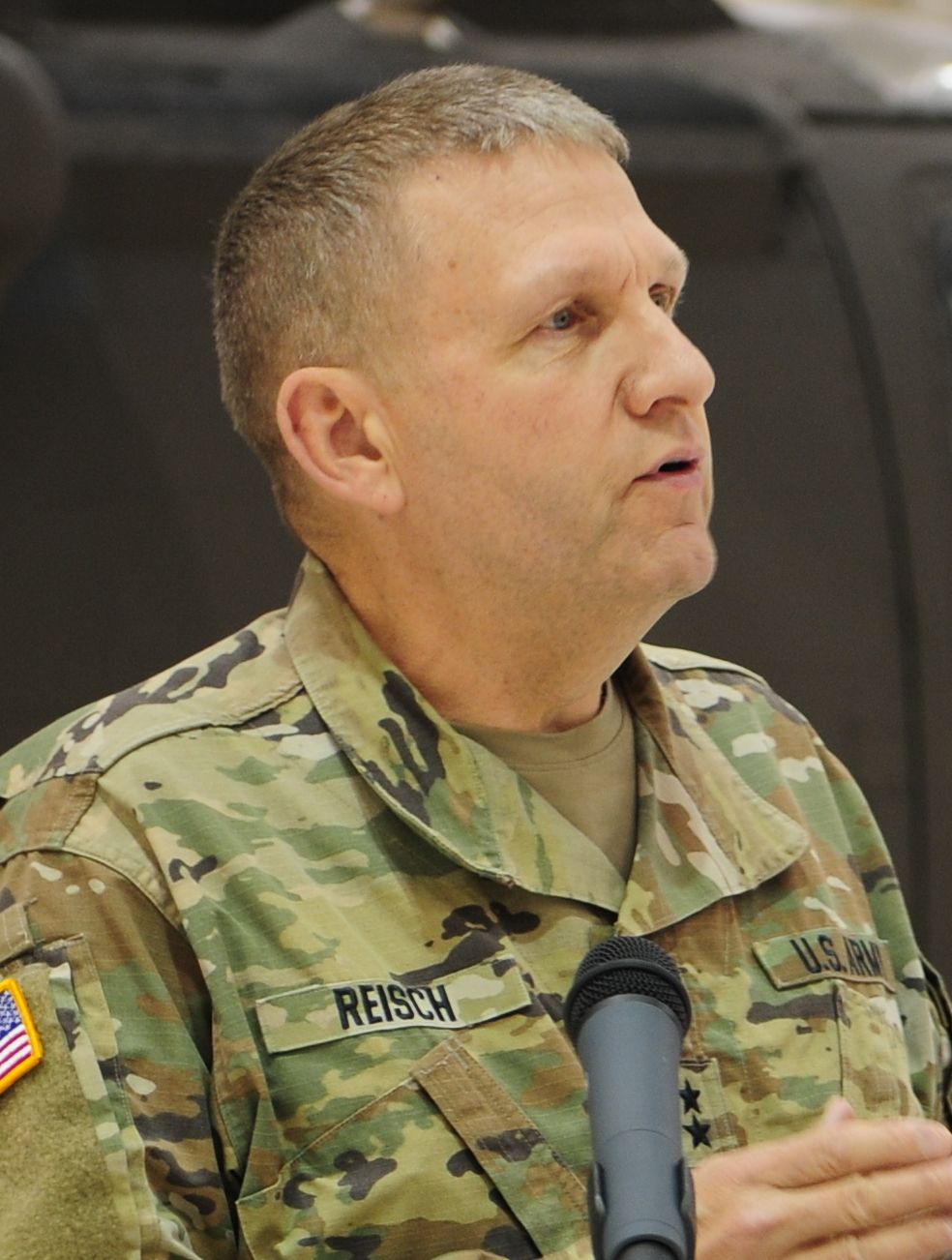
- Reisch in 2019

Member of the South Dakota House of Representatives from the 8th district
- Incumbent
- Assumed office January 10, 2023 Serving with Tim Walburg

Personal details
- Born: August 19, 1958 (age 67)
- Party: Republican
- Education: Upper Iowa University (BS); University of South Dakota (MS); United States Army War College (MS)

Tim Reisch (born August 19, 1958) is an American politician. He is a member of the South Dakota House of Representatives from the 8th district, alongside Tim Walburg. He is a member of the Republican Party.
