= Arthur Exon =

United States Air Force general

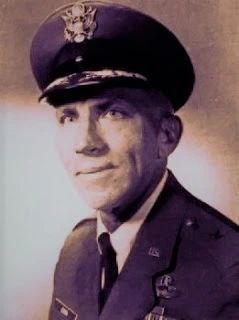
Brig. Gen. Arthur Exon

Arthur Ernest Exon (March 13, 1916 – July 22, 2005) was a brigadier general of the United States Air Force who oversaw the Cold-War-era deployment of Jupiter missiles to Italy and Turkey. A World War II fighter pilot, Exon was a recipient of the Distinguished Service Cross.

== Early life ==
Exon was born in 1916 in Geddes, South Dakota. Exon attended high school in Fairfax before studying at Southern State Teachers College in Springfield, South Dakota. In 1938, Exon returned to Fairfax, becoming principal of the junior high school.

== World War II ==
In January 1942, Exon entered the U.S. Army, listing his home town as Estherville, Iowa, and by March was undergoing training to become a pilot. Following flight school, Exon was transferred to the Mediterranean theater, where he "flew 135 combat missions in Africa, Sicily, Italy, Corsica and Southern France with a total of 325 combat hours".

In April 1944, Exon's fighter was damaged and he was forced to bail out over enemy territory. Exon was captured by Germans and held as a prisoner of war at Stalag Luft III until June 1945.

Exon was awarded the Distinguished Service Cross "for extraordinary heroism in connection with military operations against an armed enemy while serving as Pilot of a Fighter Airplane ... in aerial combat against enemy forces in the Mediterranean Theater of Operations."

== Post-war career ==
In 1946, Exon began a two-year industrial administration course at the Air Force Institute of Technology at Wright-Patterson in Ohio. In 1947, Exon became a member of the U.S. Air Force when it became a separate branch of the military. Exon was assigned to "Air Materiel Command Headquarters" where he served as chief of the Maintenance Data Section.

From August 1951 until April 1952, Exon served as deputy director of maintenance engineering at the Middletown Air Materiel Area at Olmsted Air Force Base in Pennsylvania. Exon served two years as deputy for operations for the Far East Logistics Force based out in Japan. In July 1954, he attended the Air War College. Exon spent five years at the Pentagon, holding titles such as deputy for procurement and production and deputy chief of staff for materiel.

In 1960, Exon was named chief of ballistic missiles within the Directorate of Operations at the Air Force Headquarters in Europe. In that capacity, he was responsible for establishing the Jupiter Ballistic Missile system in Italy and Turkey.

In July 1963, Exon became deputy commander of the Middletown Air Materiel Area at Olmsted Air Force Base. In August 1964 he was made commander of Wright-Patterson Air Force Base. In January 1966, Exon became director of the Defense Contract Administration Services Region in Los Angeles.

Exon retired on May 1, 1969, at the rank of brigadier general. His awards included the Distinguished Service Cross, Legion of Merit, Distinguished Flying Cross, Purple Heart, Air Medal with 15 oak leaf clusters, Air Force Commendation Medal with oak leaf cluster, British Distinguished Flying Cross, Croix de Guerre (France), with palm and star.

In retirement, Exon managed ranches in California. He was the father of at least two sons.

Exon died on July 22, 2005 and was interred at Riverside National Cemetery on August 4, 2005.
