= Chuck Jones (politician) =

American politician

Member of the South Dakota Senate from the 8th district
- In office 2013–2014
- Preceded by: Russ Olson
- Succeeded by: Scott Parsley

Personal details
- Born: January 16, 1971 (age 55)
- Party: Republican
- Spouse: Melissa
- Children: 2

Charles Eastman "Chuck" Jones (born January 16, 1971) is an American former politician. He served in the South Dakota Senate from 2013 to 2014.
