= Gary Jerke =

American politician (1948–2022)

Member of the South Dakota House of Representatives from the 19th district
- In office 2005–2008

Personal details
- Born: February 21, 1948 United States
- Died: June 28, 2022 (aged 74) Tripp, South Dakota, U.S.
- Party: Republican
- Profession: financial executive, businessman

Gary L. Jerke (February 21, 1948 – June 28, 2022) was an American politician. He served as a Republican member for the 19th district in the South Dakota House of Representatives from 2005 to 2008. Jerke was appointed in 2005 to fill the vacancy of Bill Van Gerpen.
