= Jane Teaford =

American politician

Member of the Iowa House of Representatives from the 24th district
- In office January 14, 1985 – January 10, 1993
- Preceded by: Harlan Van Gerpen
- Succeeded by: Donald Hanson

Personal details
- Born: July 1, 1935 (age 91) Hunter, Kansas
- Party: Democratic

Jane Teaford (born July 1, 1935) is an American politician who served in the Iowa House of Representatives from the 24th district from 1985 to 1993.
