= Scott Ecklund =

American politician (born 1955)

Member of the South Dakota House of Representatives from the 25th district
- Incumbent
- Assumed office January 11, 2013 Serving with Jon Hansen (January 2013 – August 2013); Kris Langer (August 14, 2013 – present)
- Preceded by: Stace Nelson

Personal details
- Born: October 3, 1955 (age 71)
- Party: Republican
- Education: National American University; University of Sioux Falls
- Profession: Physician

Scott Wayne Ecklund (born October 3, 1955) is an American politician and a Republican member of the South Dakota House of Representatives representing District 25 since January 11, 2013.

== Early life ==
Scott lives in Sioux Falls, South Dakota. He received his graduation from Augustana University and attended medical school at the University of South Dakota.

== Elections ==
- 2012 When incumbent Republican Representative Stace Nelson was redistricted to District 19 and left a District 25 seat open, Ecklund ran in the June 5, 2012 Republican Primary; in the four-way November 6, 2012 General election, incumbent Republican Representative Jon Hansen took the first seat and Ecklund took the second seat with 5,718 votes (30.90%) ahead of Democratic nominees Bill Laird and Janelle Smedsrud, who had replaced former Democratic Representative Oran Sorenson on the ballot after the primary.
