= Dean Wink =

American politician (born 1944)

Speaker of the South Dakota House of Representatives
- In office January 10, 2015 – January 10, 2017
- Preceded by: Brian Gosch
- Succeeded by: Mark Mickelson

Member of the South Dakota House of Representatives from the 29th district
- In office January 2009 – January 2017
- Preceded by: Larry Rhoden
- Succeeded by: Larry Rhoden

Member of the South Dakota Senate from the 29th district
- In office January 10, 2023 – January 2025
- Succeeded by: John Carley

Personal details
- Born: September 25, 1944 (age 82) Moville, Iowa, U.S.
- Party: Republican
- Spouse: Joan Richardson (m. 1966)
- Education: Yankton College; West Chester University
- Football career

No. 64
- Position: Defensive end

Personal information
- Listed height: 6 ft 4 in (1.93 m)
- Listed weight: 246 lb (112 kg)

Career information
- High school: Woodbury Central
- College: Yankton
- NFL draft: 1966: undrafted

Career history
- Philadelphia Eagles (1966–1968)

Career NFL statistics
- Games played: 12
- Stats at Pro Football Reference

Dean Albert Wink (born September 25, 1944) is an American politician and former football player who played parts of three seasons in the National Football League (NFL) with the Philadelphia Eagles from 1966 to 1968. A Republican, he represented District 29 in the South Dakota House of Representatives from 2009 to 2016. Wink was the Speaker pro tempore of the House from January 11, 2011 to January 10, 2015 and the Speaker of the House from January 10, 2015 to January 10, 2017.

== Career ==
Wink signed as an undrafted free agent with the Philadelphia Eagles in 1966 and made the team as a taxi squad player. He was called up to the active roster on November 10, 1967, and started his only game the next year. In the offseason, Wink received his master's degree in education. He was waived on July 15, 1969.

=== Life after football ===
After retiring from football, Wink returned to Yankton College, then moved to Arizona, where he became a rancher, before working for a Texas cattle company. Wink and his wife Joan, whom he had married in 1966, returned to South Dakota in 1988. That year they bought a ranch in Meade County, and moved to it full-time in 1994. Ten years later, Joan retired from the faculty of California State University.

== Elections ==
=== South Dakota House of Representatives ===
- 2008 When District 29 incumbent Republican Representatives Larry Rhoden ran for South Dakota Senate and left a District 29 seat open, Wink ran in the three-way June 3, 2008 Republican primary and placed second with 1,309 votes (32.3%), in the four-way November 4, 2008 General election incumbent Republican Representative Thomas Brunner took the first seat and Wink took the second seat with 5,341 votes (29.1%) ahead of Democratic nominees Fred McPherson and Bob Burns.
- 2010 Wink and incumbent representative Brunner were unopposed for the June 8, 2010 Republican Primary and won the three-way November 2, 2010 General election, where Representative Brunner took the first seat and Wink took the second seat with 5,088 votes (35.5%) ahead of Democratic nominee DaleArleta Volmer.
- 2012 When fellow District 29 incumbent Republican Representative Thomas Brunner was term limited and left the Legislature, Wink ran in the three-way June 5, 2012 Republican Primary and placed second with 1,059 votes (32.0%); Wink and Gary Cammack were unopposed for the November 6, 2012 General election, where Cammack took the first seat and Wink took the second seat with 4,824 votes (44.6%).
