= Sam Nachtigal =

American politician (born 1962)

Member of the South Dakota Senate from the 21st district
- In office January 14, 2003 – January 11, 2005
- Preceded by: Ron J. Volesky
- Succeeded by: Julie Bartling

Member of the South Dakota House of Representatives from the 25th district
- In office January 12, 1999 – January 14, 2003
- Preceded by: Kenneth Kredit
- Succeeded by: Mike Kroger; Tim Rave

Personal details
- Born: July 24, 1962 (age 64) Platte, South Dakota
- Party: Democratic

Sam Nachtigal (born July 24, 1962) is an American politician who served in the South Dakota House of Representatives from the 25th district from 1999 to 2003 and in the South Dakota Senate from the 21st district from 2003 to 2005.
