= Brian Liss =

American politician

Member of the South Dakota House of Representatives from the 13th district
- In office January 11, 2011 – January 8, 2013
- Preceded by: Bill Thompson
- Succeeded by: Mark Mickelson; Steven Westra

Personal details
- Born: December 15, 1966 (age 59)
- Party: Republican

Brian Liss (born December 15, 1966) is an American politician who served in the South Dakota House of Representatives from the 13th district from 2011 to 2013.
