= William L. Carberry =

American football player and coach (1885–1973)

William Carberry
Biographical details
- Born: March 13, 1885; Panora, Iowa, U.S.
- Died: January 14, 1974 (aged 88); San Antonio, Texas, U.S.

Playing career

Football
- 1905–1908: Iowa

Coaching career (HC unless noted)

Football
- 1914: Yankton
- 1923: Southern Normal
- 1926–1932: Southern Normal
- 1933–1939: Northern Normal
- 1942: Northern State
- 1945: Northern State

Administrative career (AD unless noted)
- 1927–1928: Southern Normal
- 1933–1955: Northern State

Accomplishments and honors

Awards
- All-Western (1908)

William Lawrence Carberry (March 13, 1885 – January 14, 1973) was an American college football player and coach. He served as the head football coach at Yankton College in Yankton, South Dakota in 1914 and at Southern State Normal School—now known as the University of South Dakota–Springfield–in 1923 and from 1926 to 1932. He also served as the head football coach at Northern State Normal School—now known as Northern State University—in Aberdeen, South Dakota from 1933 to 1939 and 1942 to 1945. His brother was Glen Carberry, a former NFL football player and head coach at St. Bonaventure University in St. Bonaventure, New York.
