= Jack Martin (coach) =

American sports coach, athletics administrator (1917–1977)

Biographical details
- Born: February 12, 1917; Springfield, South Dakota, U.S.
- Died: December 22, 1977 (aged 60); Springfield, South Dakota, U.S.

Playing career

Football
- 1936: Southern Normal
- 1939–1940: Creighton
- Position: Halfback

Coaching career (HC unless noted)

Football
- 1941: Tyndall HS (SD)
- 1946–1966: Southern State (SD)

Administrative career (AD unless noted)
- 1946–1977: Southern State (SD)

Head coaching record
- Overall: 102–64–5 (college football); 89–78 (college basketball)

Accomplishments and honors

Championships
- Football; 4 SDIC (1949, 1954, 1956, 1959)

John James Martin (February 12, 1917 – December 22, 1977) was an American football, basketball, and track and field coach and college athletics administrator. He served as the head football coach at Southern State Teachers College—later known as Southern State College and the University of South Dakota–Springfield—from 1946 to 1966. He was the athletic director of the university for more than 30 years. He also coached basketball and track at Southern State.

== Early life ==
Martin was born in Springfield, South Dakota on February 12, 1917. His mother was Mrs. Theresa Martin, a pioneer of Bon County, South Dakota. Martin attended Tyndell High School and graduated from Springfield High School in 1934.

As an athlete at Southern State Normal School, Martin earned varsity letters in three sports. On the Southern Normal track and field team, Martin specialized in the high hurdles and pole vault. He was the conference pole vault champion in 1937. He was a halfback on the football team, receiving all-conference recognition in 1936. Martin left Southern State after two years to teach high school. Two years later, Martin enrolled in Creighton University, where he played football for two years and graduated with a Bachelor of Arts degree in 1941. He earned a master's degree from the University of Iowa in 1949.

== Career ==
After attending Southern Normal, Martin taught and coached at Salem High School for two years. After graduating from Creighton in 1941, Martin coached at Tyndell High School for one year. He then joined the United States Army, serving as a captain in the infantry in the South West Pacific theatre. He received a Silver Star, a Bronze Star Medal, and a Purple Heart, before being discharged in March 1946.

In the fall of 1946, he returned to Southern State Normal School, where he was the head football coach for 21 years. Under his leadership, Southern's Pointers were champions of the South Dakota Intercollegiate Conference in 1949, 1954, 1956, and 1959, with a combined record of 102 wins, 64 losses, and 5 ties. The 1949 team was undefeated.

Through 1956, he also coached basketball and track as he was the only full-time coach on staff. His basketball teams had a record of 89–78. Martin was also the athletic director at the University of South Dakota–Springfield for more than 30 years. He was also the chairman of Southern State's Division of Health & Physical Education for 20 years. In December 1966, Martin retired from 21 years of coaching, but continued in the role of athletic director. He was the athletic director until he died in 1977.

Martin was the president of the South Dakota Intercollegiate Conference from 1968 to 1972. He was also the vice-chair of District 12 of the National Association of Intercollegiate Athletics from 1966 to 1972.

== Honors ==
In October 1976, the University of South Dakota–Springfield named its football field the Jack Martin Field in his honor.

Martin was inducted into the South Dakota Sports Hall of Fame in March 1977 and the South Dakota Hall of Fame in 1978.

== Personal life ==
In February 1946, Martin married Louise Rader of Hoven, South Dakota. The couple had five children: Dick, Mike, Karen, Mary Catherine, and Jeanne.

Martin died on December 22, 1977, in Springfield after suffering from cancer for two years.

== Head coaching record ==
=== College football ===
Year	Team	Overall	Conference	Standing	Bowl/playoffs
Southern State Pointers (South Dakota Intercollegiate Conference) (1946–1966)
1946	Southern State	2–4	1–1	3rd	
1947	Southern State	0–6–1	0–2–1	5th	
1948	Southern State	5–3	4–3	2nd	
1949	Southern State	7–0–1	5–0–1	1st	
1950	Southern State	6–2	5–2	4th	
1951	Southern State	6–1–1	6–1	2nd	
1952	Southern State	4–3	4–3	5th	
1953	Southern State	6–2	4–2	T–3rd	
1954	Southern State	6–1	6–1	T–1st	
1955	Southern State	6–2	5–2	3rd	
1956	Southern State	9–0 (Note: Northern State and Huron forfeited wins from the 1956 season over Southern State. Huron initially won the conference championship, but forfeited the title to Southern State in 1957.)	7–0	1st	
1957	Southern State	5–3	4–2	4th	
1958	Southern State	6–2–1	6–1–1	3rd	
1959	Southern State	7–2	7–1	T–1st	
1960	Southern State	4–4	3–3	T–4th	
1961	Southern State	6–3	4–2	3rd	
1962	Southern State	4–4	3–3	T–3rd	
1963	Southern State	4–4–1	2–3–1	4th	
1964	Southern State	2–7	1–5	T–6th	
1965	Southern State	1–7	1–5	T–6th	
1966	Southern State	6–3	4–2	2nd	
Southern State:		102–64–5	82–44–4		
Total:		102–64–5			
National championship Conference title Conference division title or championship game berth
