= Mark Mickelson =

American politician

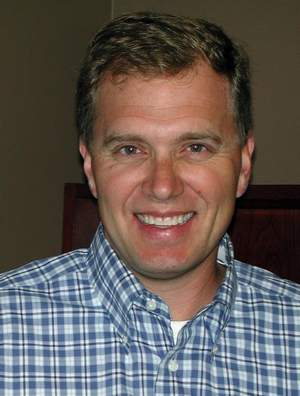

Speaker of South Dakota House of Representatives
- In office January 10, 2017 – January 8, 2019
- Preceded by: Dean Wink
- Succeeded by: Steven Haugaard

Member of the South Dakota House of Representatives from the 13th district
- In office January 11, 2013 – January 8, 2019
- Preceded by: Susy Blake; Brian Liss
- Succeeded by: Sue Peterson; Kelly Sullivan

Personal details
- Born: George Mark Mickelson; March 27, 1966 (age 60)
- Party: Republican
- Relatives: George T. Mickelson (grandfather); George S. Mickelson (father)
- Education: University of South Dakota (BA); Harvard University (JD)
- Website: Official website

George Mark Mickelson (born March 27, 1966) is an American lawyer, accountant, and politician who served as a member of the South Dakota House of Representatives, representing District 13 from 2013 to 2019. He is a Republican and a member of the prominent Mickelson family of South Dakota.

== Early life and education ==
George Mark Mickelson was born to George Speaker Mickelson, the 28th Governor of South Dakota, in 1966. His grandfather, George Theodore Mickelson, was the 18th Governor of South Dakota. Mickelson graduated from the University of South Dakota with a B.S. in accounting. He then went on to Harvard Law School to obtain his J.D.

== Political career ==
When incumbent Representatives Democrat Susy Blake and Republican Brian Liss left the legislature and left both the District 13 seats open, Mickelson ran in the three-way June 5, 2012, Republican Primary and placed first with 2,063 votes (53.6%); Mickelson and fellow Republican nominee Steven Westra were unopposed for the November 6, 2012, general election, where Mickelson took the first seat with 7,122 votes (58.06%) and Westra took the second seat.

Mickelson served as the South Dakota Speaker of the House Representatives. He retired from politics in 2018, after choosing not to run for Governor of South Dakota.

== Personal life ==
Mickelson married Cynthia Hart, whom he met at a University of South Dakota alumni event, in 1996. They have three sons, George, David, and Charles.

Political offices
Preceded by Dean Wink	Speaker of South Dakota House of Representatives; 2017–2019	Succeeded by Steven Haugaard
