= Manny Steele =

American politician (born 1940)

Member of the South Dakota House of Representatives from the 12th district
- In office 2019–2021 Serving with Hal Wick (2007–2009); Blake Curd (2009–2011); Hal Wick (2011–2015); Arch Beal (2019-2021)
- Preceded by: Greg Jamison
- Succeeded by: Greg Jamison
- In office January 2007 – 2015
- Succeeded by: Alex Jensen

Personal details
- Born: February 6, 1940 (age 86) Belgrade, Minnesota
- Party: Republican
- Education: Bellevue University

Military service
- Branch/service: United States Navy
- Years of service: 1957–1963

Manford 'Manny' J. Steele (born February 6, 1940) is an American politician and was a Republican member of the South Dakota House of Representatives representing District 12 from January 2007 until January 2015.

== Education ==
Steele earned his BA in business administration from Bellevue University.

== Elections ==
- 2012 Steele and Representative Hal Wick were unopposed for the June 5, 2012 Republican Primary; in the four-way November 6, 2012 General election Representative Wick took the first seat and Steele took the second seat with 5,029 votes (26.9%) ahead of Democratic nominees Susan Randall and Mike Knudson.
- 2006 With Representative Murschel leaving the Legislature and leaving a District 12 seat open, Wick ran in the four-way June 6, 2006 Republican Primary and placed second by 10 votes with 689 votes (27.3%); in the five-way November 7, 2006 General election incumbent Republican Representative Hal Wick took the first seat and Steele took the second seat with 4,480 votes (25.6%) ahead of Democratic nominees Joe Weis, Gregory Kniffen, and Libertarian candidate John Anderson.
- 2008 With incumbent Republican Representative Wick running for South Dakota Senate and leaving a District 12 seat open, Steele ran in the four-way June 3, 2008 Republican Primary and placed first with 1,172 votes (38.8%); in the four-way November 4, 2008 General election Steele took the first seat with 6,638 votes (29.42%) and fellow Republican nominee Blake Curd took the second seat ahead of Democratic nominees Paula Johnson and returning 2006 opponent Gregory Kniffen.
- 2010 When incumbent Representative Curd left the Legislature and left a District 12 seat open, Steele ran in the three-way June 8, 2010 Republican Primary and placed second with 1,531 votes (38.2%) and former Representative Casey Murschel placed third; in the four-way November 2, 2010 General election former Representative Hal Wick took the first seat Steele took the second seat with 5,980 votes (30.93%) ahead of Democratic nominees Paula Johnson and Joel Fagerhaug.
