= J. Mark Johnston =

American politician

Mark Johnston

Member of the South Dakota Senate from the 12th district
- In office 2011 – May 31, 2013
- Preceded by: Sandy Jerstad
- Succeeded by: Blake Curd

Personal details
- Born: September 21, 1962 (age 63) Sioux City, Iowa, U.S.
- Party: Republican
- Spouse: Julie
- Children: 2

John Mark Johnston (born September 21, 1962) is an American former politician. He served in the South Dakota Senate from 2011 to 2013.
