= Jenna Netherton =

American politician

Member of the South Dakota Senate from the 10th district
- In office January 2015 – April 10, 2018
- Preceded by: Shantel Krebs
- Succeeded by: Margaret Sutton

Member of the South Dakota House of Representatives 10th
- In office January 11, 2011 – January 13, 2015
- Preceded by: Gene G. Abdallah
- Succeeded by: Steven Haugaard

Personal details
- Born: December 11, 1985 (age 40)
- Party: Independent (2010); Republican

Jenna Netherton (born Jenna J. Haggar on December 11, 1985) is an American former politician. A Republican, she was a member of the South Dakota House of Representatives from 2011 to 2015 and a member of the South Dakota Senate from 2015 to 2018. She is the daughter of politician Don Haggar.

== Elections ==
In 2012, she was redistricted to District 10. With incumbent Republican Representative Gene Abdallah running to return to the South Dakota Senate and Roger Hunt term limited and leaving both District 10 seats open, Netherton ran alongside her father in the three-way June 5, 2012, Republican primary, where she placed first with 623 votes (42.67%) and he placed second ahead of former state Senator Dave Munson. In the four-way November 6, 2012, general election, she took the first seat with 5,316 votes (31,50%) and her father took the second seat ahead of Democratic nominees Jo Hausman and Brian Parsons.

In 2010, running as an Independent to challenge District 15 incumbent Democratic Representatives Patrick Kirschman and Martha Vanderlinde in the three-way November 2, 2010, general election, Netherton took the first seat with 2,264 votes (38.50%) and incumbent Representative Kirschman took the second seat ahead of incumbent Representative Vanderlinde.
