= Gary Cammack =

American politician (born 1953)

Majority Leader of the South Dakota Senate
- In office January 12, 2021 – January 10, 2023
- Preceded by: Kris Langer
- Succeeded by: Casey Crabtree

Member of the South Dakota Senate from the 29th district
- In office January 2015 – January 10, 2023
- Preceded by: Larry Rhoden
- Succeeded by: Dean Wink

Member of the South Dakota House of Representatives from the 29th district
- In office January 11, 2013 – January 2015 Serving with Dean Wink
- Preceded by: Thomas J. Brunner
- Succeeded by: Thomas J. Brunner

Personal details
- Born: June 9, 1953 (age 73) Union Center, South Dakota, U.S.
- Party: Republican

Gary L. Cammack (born June 9, 1953) is an American politician and a Republican member of the South Dakota House of Representatives representing District 29 since January 11, 2013.

== Elections ==
=== South Dakota House of Representatives ===
2012 When incumbent Republican Representative Thomas J. Brunner was term limited and left the Legislature and left a District 29 seat open, Cammack ran in the three-way June 5, 2012 Republican Primary and placed first with 1,450 votes (43.8%); Cammack and incumbent Republican Representative Dean Wink were unopposed for the November 6, 2012 General election, where Cammack took the first seat with 5,991 votes (55.40%) and Representative Wink took the second seat.

South Dakota Senate
Preceded by Kris Langer	Majority Leader of the South Dakota Senate; 2021–2023	Succeeded by Casey Crabtree
