= Angie Buhl =

American politician

Angie Buhl O'Donnell

Member of the South Dakota Senate from the 15th district
- In office January 2011 – January 2017
- Preceded by: Kathy Miles
- Succeeded by: Reynold Nesiba

Personal details
- Born: January 19, 1985 (age 41) Aberdeen, South Dakota
- Party: Democratic
- Spouse: Jacob O'Donnell
- Education: University of South Dakota
- Website: angiebuhl.com

Angie Buhl O'Donnell is an American politician from Sioux Falls, South Dakota. A member of the Democratic Party, she served in the South Dakota Senate from 2011 to 2017, where she represented the Minnehaha County-based 15th district. She was the first openly LGBT member of the South Dakota Legislature.

== Early life and education ==
A fourth generation South Dakotan, Buhl was born in Aberdeen and raised in Yankton. An adoptee, her parents were small business owners. She graduated from the University of South Dakota in 2007 with a degree in psychology and music.

== Career ==
In 2010, Buhl O'Donnell ran against incumbent state senator Kathy Miles, a fellow Democrat. In the primary election held on June 8, 2010, Buhl O'Donnell received 398 votes while Miles earned only 276. Buhl was therefore nominated and, since no Republicans or independents had filed, she won the general election unopposed. She took office in January 2011.

Buhl O'Donnell is openly bisexual and was the first LGBT member of the South Dakota Legislature. Buhl was re-elected in 2012 for a second term. Her 2012 reelection campaign won the support of the Gay & Lesbian Victory Fund. In 2014, she was the youngest member of the South Dakota Senate. Buhl won reelection in 2014, but chose not to run for reelection in 2016.
