= South Dakota's 8th legislative district =

American legislative district

South Dakota's 8th State Senate district

South Dakota's 8th legislative district is one of 35 districts in the South Dakota Legislature. Each district is represented by 1 senator and 2 representatives. In the Senate, it has been represented by Republican Casey Crabtree since his appointment in 2020. In the House, it has been represented by Republicans John Mills since 2017 and Tim Reisch since 2023.

== Geography ==
The district is located in eastern South Dakota. It contains the counties of Brookings, Kingsbury, Lake, and Miner. Its largest city is Madison.

== Recent elections ==
South Dakota legislators are elected to two-year terms, with each permitted to serve a maximum of four consecutive terms. Elections are held every even-numbered year.

=== State senate elections ===
Year	Incumbent	Party	First elected	Result	General election	Primary elections
2022	Casey Crabtree	Republican	2020	Incumbent re-elected.	▌ ✓ Casey Crabtree (Republican) 100%	Republican: ▌ ✓ Casey Crabtree (inc.) 79.0%; ▌ Heather DeVries 79.0%
2020	Casey Crabtree	Republican	(appointed)	Incumbent re-elected.	▌ ✓ Casey Crabtree (Republican) 100%	(unopposed)
2018	Jordan Youngberg	Republican	2016	Incumbent re-elected.	▌ ✓ Jordan Youngberg (Republican) 55.2%; ▌ Scott Parsley (Democratic) 44.8%	(both candidates unopposed)
2016	Scott Parsley	Democratic	2014	Incumbent defeated. Republican gain.	▌ ✓ Jordan Youngberg (Republican) 50.4%; ▌ Scott Parsley (Democratic) 49.6%	(both candidates unopposed)
2014	Chuck Jones	Republican	(appointed)	Incumbent defeated. Democratic gain.	▌ ✓ Scott Parsley (Democratic) 52%; ▌ Chuck Jones (Republican) 48%	(both candidates unopposed)
2012	Russell Olson	Republican	2008	Incumbent re-elected.	▌ ✓ Russell Olson (Republican) 63.4%; ▌ Charles Johnson (Democratic) 36.6%	(both candidates unopposed)
