= Kris Langer =

American politician (born 1969)

Majority Leader of the South Dakota Senate
- In office January 8, 2019 – January 12, 2021
- Preceded by: Blake Curd
- Succeeded by: Gary Cammack

Member of the South Dakota Senate from the 25th district
- In office January 10, 2017 – January 12, 2021
- Preceded by: Tim Rave
- Succeeded by: Marsha Symens

Member of the South Dakota House of Representatives from the 25th district
- In office August 15, 2013 – January 10, 2017 Serving with Scott Ecklund
- Preceded by: Jon Hansen
- Succeeded by: Tom Pischke; Daniel Ahlers

Personal details
- Born: August 17, 1969 (age 57) Brookings, South Dakota, U.S.
- Party: Republican
- Spouse: Tracy
- Children: 2
- Education: South Dakota State University (BS)

Kristen K. Langer (born August 17, 1969) is an American politician who served as a member of the South Dakota Senate for the 25th district from 2017 to 2021. She was appointed by Governor Dennis Daugaard to the South Dakota House of Representatives after Jon Hansen resigned. In 2019, she became the South Dakota State Senate Majority Leader.

== Elections ==
=== South Dakota House of Representatives ===
In the November 4, 2014 general election, Langer ran unopposed for the South Dakota House of Representatives. She received 4,601 votes.

=== South Dakota State Senate ===
In the November 2016 general election, Langer ran for election to the South Dakota State Senate against Democrat Jeff Barth, whom she defeated by a margin of 7,254 to 4,301.

In the November 2018 general election, Langer ran for reelection against Independent Brian Wirth and Independent Peter Kiebanoff. She won, receiving 6,583 votes; Wirth received 1,931 votes and Kiebanoff received 1,15 votes.

In 2020, Langer was uncontested for the Republican nomination but drew two Independent challengers for the general election. On August 4, 2020, Langer announced she would not seek re-election to the state senate, but would complete her term.

== Controversy ==
=== Admonishment by State Senate ===
On March 30, 2020, during a late-night session of the legislature Langer was accused by fellow State Senator Phil Jensen of being intoxicated at the Capitol. In April 2020, a bipartisan committee established to look into the allegations against Langer and President Pro Tempore Brock Greenfield, voted 9-0 to admonish both of Langer and Greenfield for their conduct. During the hearing, Langer and Greenfield acknowledged drinking alcohol during a break in Senate proceedings. They apologized "for this bad judgment on our part and for any delay this may have brought about for other members."

South Dakota Senate
| Preceded by Blake Curd | Majority Leader of the South Dakota Senate; 2019–2021 | Succeeded by Gary Cammack |
