= Marsha Symens =

American politician

Member of the South Dakota Senate from the 25th district
- Incumbent
- Assumed office January 12, 2021
- Preceded by: Kris Langer

Personal details
- Party: Republican

Marsha Symens is an American politician and former educator representing the 25th district in the South Dakota Senate. Symens took office on January 12, 2021, succeeding Kris Langer. Before entering politics, she worked as a teacher in Phoenix, Arizona; Houston; and Dell Rapids, South Dakota.
