= 2010 United States House of Representatives election in South Dakota =

- November 2, 2010
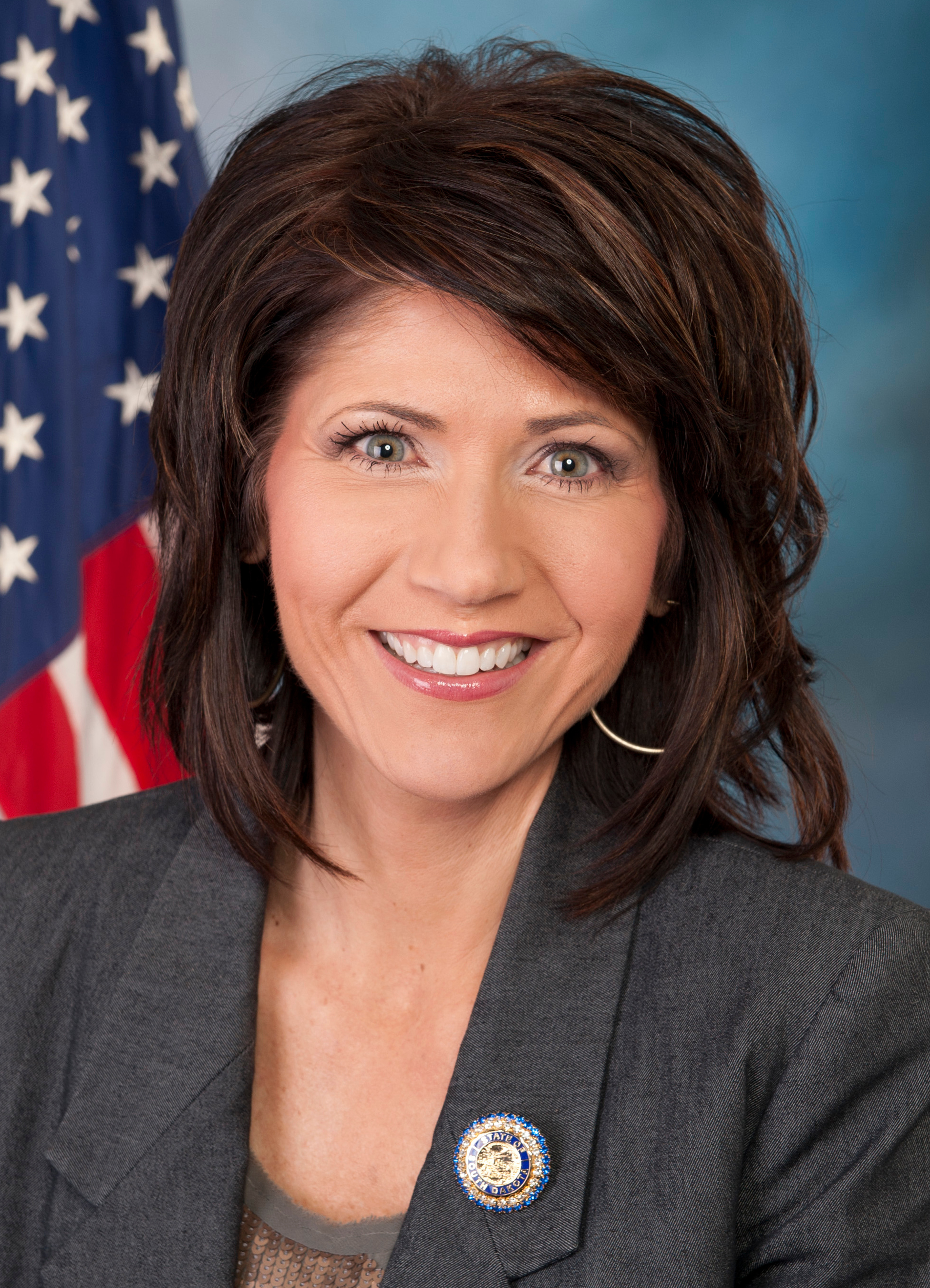

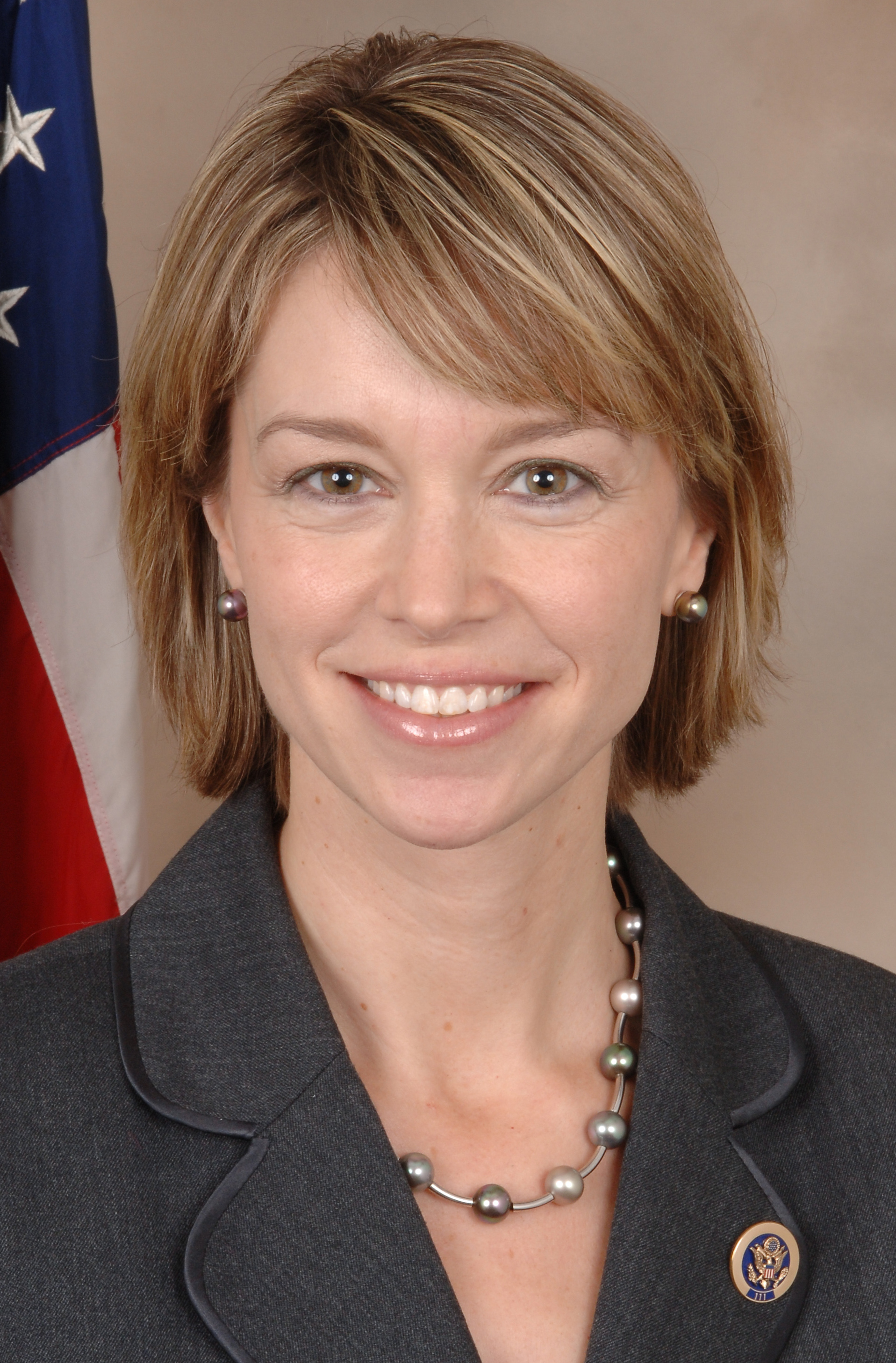

Nominee	Kristi Noem	Stephanie Herseth Sandlin	B. Thomas Marking
Party	Republican	Democratic	Independent
Popular vote	153,703	146,589	19,134
Percentage	48.12%	45.89%	5.99%
- County results Noem: 40–50% 50–60% 60–70% 70–80% Herseth Sandlin: 40–50% 50–60% 60–70% 70–80% >90%
U.S. Representative before election
Stephanie Herseth Sandlin
Democratic
Elected U.S. Representative
Kristi Noem
Republican

The 2010 United States House of Representatives election in South Dakota took place on Tuesday, November 2, 2010. Voters selected a representative for their single at-large district, who runs on a statewide ballot. On June 8, 2010, the Republicans nominated Kristi Noem, assistant majority leader of the South Dakota House of Representatives, and the Democrats nominated the incumbent Stephanie Herseth Sandlin. B. Thomas Marking ran as an independent candidate. In the general election, Noem defeated Herseth Sandlin, winning 48.1 percent of the vote to 45.9 percent for Herseth Sandlin.

== Democratic primary ==
=== Candidates ===
==== Nominee ====
- Stephanie Herseth Sandlin, incumbent

== Republican primary ==
=== Candidates ===
==== Nominee ====
- Kristi Noem, assistant majority leader of the South Dakota House of Representatives

==== Lost in primary ====
- Blake Curd, member of the South Dakota House of Representatives
- Chris Nelson, secretary of state of South Dakota (2003-2011)

===== Withdrawn =====
- Thad Wasson, technician

===== Declined =====
- Shantel Krebs, member of the South Dakota House of Representatives (2015-2019)

=== Primary results ===
2010 Republican primary election – at-large congressional district of South Dakota
Party	Candidate	Votes	%
Republican	Kristi Noem	34,527	42.1
Republican	Chris Nelson	28,380	34.6
Republican	Blake Curd	19,134	23.3
Total votes		82,041	100.0

== Campaign ==
=== Issues ===
During the general election campaign, Republicans criticized Herseth Sandlin's voting record. They also criticized her lobbyist husband's clients list, noting that the companies had interests in legislation that would come before Congress. Noem pointed out that the National Association of Broadcasters paid Herseth Sandlin's husband, Max Sandlin, a lobbyist and former Congressman, $320,000 during the years 2008 and 2009 to lobby on their behalf, including a bill co-sponsored by Herseth Sandlin called the Local Radio Freedom Act. Herseth Sandlin responded that Noem's example was "laughable". The Rapid City Journal editorial board stated that Herseth Sandlin should not be laughing at a legitimate concern. Roll Call called the Republican effort an attempt "to stoke anti-Beltway emotions". Herseth Sandlin's campaign responded that she did not allow family members to lobby her or her staff. According to a Washington attorney, Herseth Sandlin's policy seemed compliant with House ethics rules tightened in 2007, though Republicans charged that Herseth Sandlin was violating the spirit of the conflict-of-interest rules. "The Sunlight Foundation, Public Citizen and other watchdog groups are highly critical of Herseth Sandlin and other Members whose relatives work in Congressional corridors," according to Roll Call. The groups have said the House ethics rules should be comparable to the Senate's and should ban all lobbying "under the Dome" by Member's relatives.

=== Polling ===
Poll source	Date(s) administered	Stephanie Herseth Sandlin (D)	Kristi Noem (R)
Rasmussen Reports	February 23, 2010	49%	34%
Rasmussen Reports	March 25, 2010	46%	35%
Rasmussen Reports	April 26, 2010	50%	35%
Rasmussen Reports	May 27, 2010	46%	43%
Rasmussen Reports	June 14, 2010	41%	53%
Rasmussen Reports	July 6, 2010	44%	49%
Rasmussen Reports	August 3, 2010	42%	51%
Rasmussen Reports	September 8, 2010	47%	45%
Rasmussen Reports	October 4, 2010	44%	47%
Rasmussen Reports	October 20, 2010	44%	49%
Nielson Brothers Polling	October 20–22, 2010	42%	40%

On October 24, 2010, Nate Silver of The New York Times' FiveThirtyEight.com blog predicted that there was a 69.9% chance that Noem would defeat Sandlin.

==== Predictions ====
Source	Ranking	As of
The Cook Political Report	Tossup	November 1, 2010
Rothenberg	Tilt R (flip)	November 1, 2010
Sabato's Crystal Ball	Lean R (flip)	November 1, 2010
RCP	Lean R (flip)	November 1, 2010
CQ Politics	Tossup	October 28, 2010
New York Times	Tossup	November 1, 2010
FiveThirtyEight	Lean R (flip)	November 1, 2010

=== Fundraising ===
The race saw each candidate spend over $1.75 million and was the first in Herseth Sandlin's career where she was outspent.

Funding from political parties and interest groups totaled $2,651,621 for the race, with 78% benefiting Noem. Groups supporting Herseth-Sandlin included the DCCC and CUNA. Noem was supported by the American Action Network, the NRCC, and the American Future Fund.

== Results ==
2010 South Dakota's at-large congressional district election
Party	Candidate	Votes	%
Republican	Kristi Noem	153,703	48.12%
Democratic	Stephanie Herseth Sandlin (incumbent)	146,589	45.89%
Independent	B. Thomas Marking	19,134	5.99%
Total votes		319,426	100.00%
Republican gain from Democratic			

=== By county ===
County	Stephanie Herseth Sandlin Democratic		Kristi Noem Republican		B. Thomas Marking Independent		Margin		Total
County	#	%	#	%	#	%	#	%	Total
Aurora	707	50.72%	593	42.54%	94	6.74%	-114	-8.18%	1,394
Beadle	3,541	51.32%	2,941	42.62%	418	6.06%	-600	-8.70%	6,900
Bennett	502	47.45%	499	47.16%	57	5.39%	-3	-0.28%	1,058
Bon Homme	1,334	47.07%	1,265	44.64%	235	8.29%	-69	-2.43%	2,834
Brookings	6,195	55.57%	4,147	37.19%	808	7.25%	-2,049	-18.38%	11,150
Brown	8,100	55.95%	5,712	39.46%	665	4.59%	-2,388	-16.50%	14,477
Brule	1,017	47.35%	971	45.20%	160	7.45%	-46	-2.14%	2,148
Buffalo	351	77.48%	91	20.09%	11	2.43%	-260	-57.40%	453
Butte	1,128	30.36%	2,357	63.43%	231	6.22%	1,229	33.07%	3,716
Campbell	301	38.10%	452	57.22%	37	4.68%	151	19.11%	790
Charles Mix	1,620	46.13%	1,710	48.69%	182	5.18%	90	2.56%	3,512
Clark	787	46.68%	773	45.85%	126	7.47%	-14	-0.83%	1,686
Clay	2,802	59.74%	1,642	35.01%	246	5.25%	-1,160	-24.73%	4,690
Codington	4,684	45.27%	4,983	48.16%	679	6.56%	299	2.89%	10,346
Corson	450	51.61%	362	41.51%	60	6.88%	-88	-10.09%	872
Custer	1,278	32.20%	2,378	59.91%	313	7.89%	1,100	27.71%	3,969
Davison	3,437	47.22%	3,467	47.64%	374	5.14%	30	0.41%	7,278
Day	1,668	60.48%	937	33.97%	153	5.55%	-731	-26.50%	2,758
Deuel	999	48.83%	877	42.86%	170	8.31%	-122	-5.96%	2,046
Dewey	1,070	67.89%	442	28.05%	64	4.06%	-628	-39.85%	1,576
Douglas	489	29.40%	1,083	65.12%	91	5.47%	594	35.72%	1,663
Edmunds	834	46.46%	838	46.69%	123	6.85%	4	0.22%	1,795
Fall River	1,056	33.89%	1,824	58.54%	236	7.57%	768	24.65%	3,116
Faulk	466	42.87%	553	50.87%	68	6.26%	87	8.00%	1,087
Grant	1,638	46.80%	1,597	45.63%	265	7.57%	-41	-1.17%	3,500
Gregory	785	38.24%	1,129	54.99%	139	6.77%	344	16.76%	2,053
Haakon	254	24.54%	718	69.37%	63	6.09%	464	44.83%	1,035
Hamlin	963	36.39%	1,463	55.29%	220	8.31%	500	18.90%	2,646
Hand	804	43.70%	906	49.24%	130	7.07%	102	5.54%	1,840
Hanson	594	34.06%	1,048	60.09%	102	5.85%	454	26.03%	1,744
Harding	127	18.93%	490	73.03%	54	8.05%	363	54.10%	671
Hughes	3,432	44.54%	3,849	49.95%	425	5.52%	417	5.41%	7,706
Hutchinson	1,176	36.74%	1,822	56.92%	203	6.34%	646	20.18%	3,201
Hyde	277	38.47%	412	57.22%	31	4.31%	135	18.75%	720
Jackson	369	38.36%	534	55.51%	59	6.13%	165	17.15%	962
Jerauld	581	51.37%	461	40.76%	89	7.87%	-120	-10.61%	1,131
Jones	180	30.51%	377	63.90%	33	5.59%	197	33.39%	590
Kingsbury	1,229	49.66%	1,044	42.18%	202	8.16%	-185	-7.47%	2,475
Lake	2,458	47.23%	2,414	46.39%	332	6.38%	-44	-0.85%	5,204
Lawrence	4,019	39.41%	5,431	53.26%	747	7.33%	1,412	13.85%	10,197
Lincoln	7,699	42.77%	9,440	52.44%	862	4.79%	1,741	9.67%	18,001
Lyman	604	43.14%	677	48.36%	119	8.50%	73	5.21%	1,400
Marshall	1,107	59.77%	660	35.64%	85	4.59%	-447	-24.14%	1,852
McCook	1,126	44.82%	1,216	48.41%	170	6.77%	90	3.58%	2,512
McPherson	447	37.03%	692	57.33%	68	5.63%	245	20.30%	1,207
Meade	3,049	32.45%	5,741	61.10%	606	6.45%	2,692	28.65%	9,396
Mellette	373	49.21%	320	42.22%	65	8.58%	-53	-6.99%	758
Miner	581	52.11%	458	41.08%	76	6.82%	-123	-11.03%	1,115
Minnehaha	32,430	49.82%	28,968	44.50%	3,698	5.68%	-3,462	-5.32%	65,096
Moody	1,433	52.20%	1,111	40.47%	201	7.32%	-322	-11.73%	2,745
Pennington	13,597	36.66%	21,489	57.94%	2,002	5.40%	7,892	21.28%	37,088
Perkins	418	30.36%	859	62.38%	100	7.26%	441	32.03%	1,377
Potter	518	39.18%	745	56.35%	59	4.46%	227	17.17%	1,322
Roberts	2,077	53.92%	1,507	39.12%	268	6.96%	-570	-14.80%	3,852
Sanborn	578	49.66%	514	44.16%	72	6.19%	-64	-5.50%	1,164
Shannon	2,260	90.29%	191	7.63%	52	2.08%	-2,069	-82.66%	2,503
Spink	1,564	53.20%	1,201	40.85%	175	5.95%	-363	-12.35%	2,940
Stanley	601	42.12%	726	50.88%	100	7.01%	125	8.76%	1,427
Sully	270	36.19%	427	57.24%	49	6.57%	157	21.05%	746
Todd	1,500	74.93%	421	21.03%	81	4.05%	-1,079	-53.90%	2,002
Tripp	949	37.84%	1,390	55.42%	169	6.74%	441	17.58%	2,508
Turner	1,676	44.07%	1,875	49.30%	252	6.63%	199	5.23%	3,803
Union	2,408	39.89%	3,356	55.60%	272	4.51%	948	15.71%	6,036
Walworth	871	38.90%	1,229	54.89%	139	6.21%	358	15.99%	2,239
Yankton	4,336	50.07%	3,653	42.18%	671	7.75%	-683	-7.89%	8,660
Ziebach	415	60.32%	245	35.61%	28	4.07%	-170	-24.71%	688
Totals	146,589	45.89%	153,703	48.12%	19,134	5.99%	7,114	2.23%	319,426

==== Counties that flipped from Democratic to Republican ====
- Douglas (largest city: Armour)
- Union (largest city: Dakota Dunes)
- Hutchinson (largest city: Parkston)
- Lincoln (largest city: Sioux Falls)
- Turner (largest city: Parker)
- Butte (largest city: Belle Fourche)
- Perkins (largest city: Belle Fourche)
- Tripp (largest city: Winner)
- Fall River (largest city: Hot Springs)
- Lawrence (largest city: Spearfish)
- Meade (largest city: Sturgis)
- Pennington (largest city: Rapid City)
- Gregory (largest city: Gregory)
- Stanley (largest city: Fort Pierre)
- Sully (largest city: Onida)
- Hughes (largest city: Pierre)
- Hyde (largest city: Highmore)
- McPherson (largest city: Eureka)
- Potter (largest city: Gettysburg)
- Walworth (largest city: Mobridge)
- Campbell (largest city: Herreid)
- Hanson (largest city: Alexandria)
- Codington (largest city: Watertown)
- Davison (largest city: Mitchell)
- Hamlin (largest city: Estelline)
- McCook (largest city: Salem)
- Charles Mix (largest city: Wagner)
- Edmunds (largest city: Ipswich)
- Faulk (largest city: Faulkton)
- Hand (largest city: Miller)
- Jackson (largest city: Kadoka)
- Lyman (largest city: Lower Brule)
- Custer (largest city: Custer)
- Douglas (largest city: Armour)
- Haakon (largest city: Philip)
- Harding (largest city: Buffalo)
- Jones (largest city: Murdo)

== See also ==
- South Dakota's at-large congressional district
