= Blake Curd =

American politician (born 1967)

Majority Leader of the South Dakota Senate
- In office January 10, 2017 – January 8, 2019
- Preceded by: Tim Rave
- Succeeded by: Kris Langer

Member of the South Dakota Senate from the 12th district
- In office June 6, 2013 – January 10, 2023
- Preceded by: J. Mark Johnston
- Succeeded by: Arch Beal

Member of the South Dakota House of Representatives from the 33rd district
- In office January 2009 – January 11, 2011 Serving with Manny Steele
- Preceded by: Hal Wick
- Succeeded by: Hal Wick

Personal details
- Born: September 19, 1967 (age 59) Atlantic, Iowa, U.S.
- Party: Republican
- Education: University of Missouri, Columbia (BS); University of Missouri, Kansas City (MD)

Richard Blake Curd (born September 19, 1967) is an American politician and a former Republican member of the South Dakota Senate representing District 12 from 2013 to 2023. Curd served non-consecutively in the South Dakota Legislature from January 2009 until January 11, 2011 in the South Dakota House of Representatives District 12 seat. He was a candidate for the United States House of Representatives for South Dakota's at-large congressional district in the 2010 election. Curd was appointed to the South Dakota Senate to fill the vacancy caused by the resignation of Republican Senator J. Mark Johnston.

== Education ==
Curd graduated from the University of Missouri–Kansas City School of Medicine.

== Elections ==
- 2010 To challenge incumbent Democratic United States House of Representatives member Stephanie Herseth Sandlin, Curd ran in the three-way June 8, 2010 Republican Primary but lost to state Representative Kristi Noem; Noem went on to win the three-way November 2, 2010 General election against U.S. Representative Sandlin and Independent candidate B. Thomas Marking.
- 2008 When House District 33 incumbent Republican Representative Michael Buckingham ran for South Dakota Senate and incumbent Republican Representative Don Van Etten was term limited and left the Legislature, Curd ran in the four-way June 3, 2008 Republican Primary and placed second with 747 votes (24.8%), in the four-way November 4, 2008 General election incumbent Representative Manny Steele took the first seat and Curd took the second seat with 6,119 votes (27.1%) ahead of Democratic nominees Paula Johnson and Gregory Kniffen, who had run for the seat in 2006.

South Dakota Senate
Preceded by Tim Rave	Majority Leader of the South Dakota Senate; 2017–2019	Succeeded by Kris Langer
