= Kameron Nelson (politician) =

American politician

Kameron Nelson is an American politician who served as a member of the South Dakota House of Representatives representing district 10, covering a portion of Sioux Falls in Minnehaha County, since January 10, 2023. He has also served a minority whip. He is the first openly gay man to serve in the South Dakota legislature. He is a member of the Democratic Party. He worked for several years in philanthropy and in 2024 became CEO of Lost&Found, a suicide prevention nonprofit.

Nelson grew up in Rapid City and earned a bachelor's degree in communications studies and theater at South Dakota State University. After working for several years in theater production he launched a career in philanthropy. After a stint at the Black Hills Works Foundation, he was director of major gifts for the LifeScape Foundation, which provides resources for children and adults with disabilities and complex medical care, for five years. In August 2024, he was named CEO of Lost&Found, a regional nonprofit devoted to suicide prevention and follow-up programs for youth and young adults, effective October 1. He lives in Sioux Falls. He heads the board of the South Dakota Transformation Project, which provides services and education related to transgender.

Nelson ran for reelection in November 2024 and ran unopposed in the June 2024 primary but lost the general election.
