= Richard Wudel =

American politician

Member of the South Dakota House of Representatives from the 19th district
- In office 1999–2000
- In office 1989–1990

Personal details
- Born: June 1, 1941 (age 85) Belle Fourche, South Dakota
- Party: Republican
- Spouse: Jeanette
- Children: three

Richard Allen Wudel (born June 1, 1941) is an American former politician. He has served as a Republican member in the South Dakota House of Representatives from 1989 to 1990, and 1999 to 2000.
