= Janice K. Nicolay =

American politician (1942–2024)

Member of the South Dakota House of Representatives
- In office 1983–1996

Personal details
- Born: January 2, 1942 Watertown, South Dakota, U.S.
- Died: May 18, 2024 (aged 82)
- Party: Republican
- Education: Northern State College; South Dakota State University

Janice K. Nicolay (January 2, 1942 – May 18, 2024) was an American politician. She served as a Republican member of the South Dakota House of Representatives.

== Life and career ==
Nicolay was born in Watertown, South Dakota. She attended Northern State College and South Dakota State University.

Nicolay served in the South Dakota House of Representatives from 1983 to 1996.

Nicolay died on May 18, 2024, at the age of 82.
