= Jess Tjeerdsma =

American politician and farmer (1907–1977)

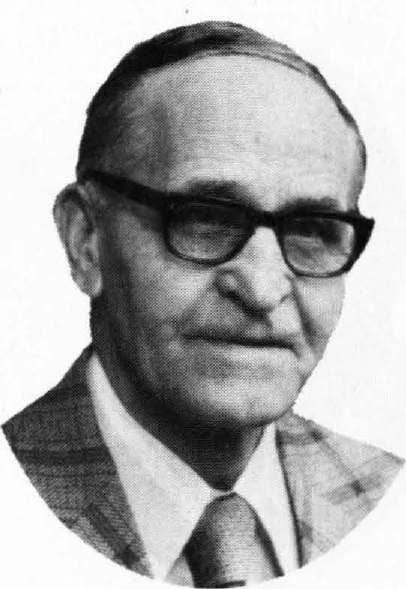
- Official portrait, c. 1977

Member of the South Dakota Senate from the 16th district
- In office January 7, 1975 – August 19, 1977
- Preceded by: Frank Novotny
- Succeeded by: Robert Lyons

Personal details
- Born: July 25, 1907 Near Running Water, South Dakota, U.S.
- Died: August 20, 1977 (aged 70) Tyndall, South Dakota, U.S.
- Party: Republican
- Spouse: Johanna Odens (m. 1928)
- Children: 7
- Education: Southern State College

Jess Tjeerdsma (July 25, 1907 – August 20, 1977) was an American politician and farmer from South Dakota. Born near Running Water, he served as the county treasurer of Bon Homme County for 14 years, beginning around 1959. In 1974, he was elected to the South Dakota Senate as a member of the Republican Party. Throughout his tenure in the Senate, Tjeerdsma was a proponent of several bills, including one that proposed a 6.5% corporate income tax in South Dakota, which was defeated in the state House of Representatives. He served until August 19, 1977, when he resigned due to ongoing health problems. The following day, Tjeerdsma died at a hospital in Tyndall.

== Life and career ==
Jess Tjeerdsma was born near Running Water, South Dakota, on July 25, 1907. He graduated from Southern State College. On June 15, 1928, he married Johanna Odens; together, they had seven children. Tjeerdsma taught at a rural school for three years and was a farmer for 22 years.

Circa 1955, Tjeerdsma became the register of deeds for Bon Homme County. In 1959, he announced his campaign for the Republican Party nomination for county treasurer of Bon Homme County. He defeated his Democratic Party opponent Steven Schneider; Tjeerdsma received 2,390 votes compared to Schneider's 1,570 votes. According to the South Dakota Legislative Manual, Tjeerdsma served in the position of county treasurer for 14 years. Tjeerdsma was selected to the pulpit supply committee of the Emmanuel Reformed Church in Springfield in January 1967. In April that year Tjeerdsma was elected as vice president of the St. Michael's Hospital lay advisory board. Two years after in October 1969, he was selected as chairman of the board.

In 1974, Tjeerdsma was elected to the South Dakota Senate, representing its 16th district. He was sworn in, alongside the rest of the legislature, on January 7, 1975. In February 1975, Tjeerdsma introduced a bill—alongside Arlo Leddy, Charles Flyte, Billie Sutton, and Harold Anderson—that proposed a 6.5% corporate income tax within South Dakota. The tax money would have been used to recuperate lost revenue from eliminating property taxes on livestock. The bill was one of three corporate income tax bills introduced in the 50th session of the South Dakota Legislature. The measure was first proposed by Richard Kneip, the governor of South Dakota. The measure was later amended by House Majority Leader Walter Dale Miller, who proposed decreasing the 6.5% corporate income tax to just 3% and adding a 1.5% tax on federal taxable income from individuals. The House voted against the bill 42–26 on March 14. A similar bill which proposed a 4% corporate income tax narrowly passed the House in a 37–33 vote earlier on March 12. Tjeerdsma and James Dunn, a fellow Republican, broke party lines by voting to discuss the bill; most Republicans were in opposition against the bill, calling it "discriminatory". In December 1975, Tjeerdsma and representatives Robert Lyons and Lyle Mensch sponsored a bill that would allow Charles Mix County to receive $56,800 in state funds to cover the costs of prosecutions stemming from the May 2 takeover of a Wagner pork plant; the takeover resulted in seven people being charged.

Tjeerdsma was one of 20 legislators in January 1976 who co-sponsored a bill that would allow landowners in areas of Brown, Day, Marshall, Spink, and Sully counties to vote on the future of the Oahe Irrigation Project. The bill's primary sponsor was Representative Kenneth Stofferahn. Later in the month, an act introduced by Tjeerdsma and five other senators was unanimously passed by the Senate State Affairs Committee that permitted compliance with the 1975 amendment to the Voting Rights Act of 1965 to provide specialized assistance for minority voters in specific counties. Following the Senate elections in 1976, Tjeerdsma was appointed as chairman of the health and welfare committee at the Senate.

On August 19, 1977, Tjeerdsma resigned from the South Dakota Senate; in his letter to Kneip, he cited health issues. The following day, he died at a hospital in Tyndall. In October, Democrats in Tjeerdsma's district submitted five names to Kneip, a fellow Democrat, in order to replace Tjeerdsma in the Senate. He ended up selecting Lyons. (Note: A contemporary news article stated that Lyons was appointed on October 13, while the 1981 edition of the South Dakota Legislative Manual claimed he was appointed on October 7.) The appointment caused the Republican Party to fall one short of the two-thirds supermajority required in the Senate to override vetoes from the governor.

== Note and references ==
Note
