= Kenneth Kredit =

American politician

Member of the South Dakota House of Representatives from the 25th district
- In office January 10, 1995 – January 12, 1999
- Succeeded by: Sam Nachtigal

Personal details
- Born: February 5, 1931 Corsica, South Dakota
- Died: October 9, 2025 (aged 94) Urbandale, Iowa
- Party: Republican

Kenneth Kredit (February 5, 1931 – October 9, 2025) was an American politician who served in the South Dakota House of Representatives from the 25th district from 1995 to 1999.

He died on October 9, 2025, in Urbandale, Iowa at age 94.
