= Frank Kloucek =

American politician

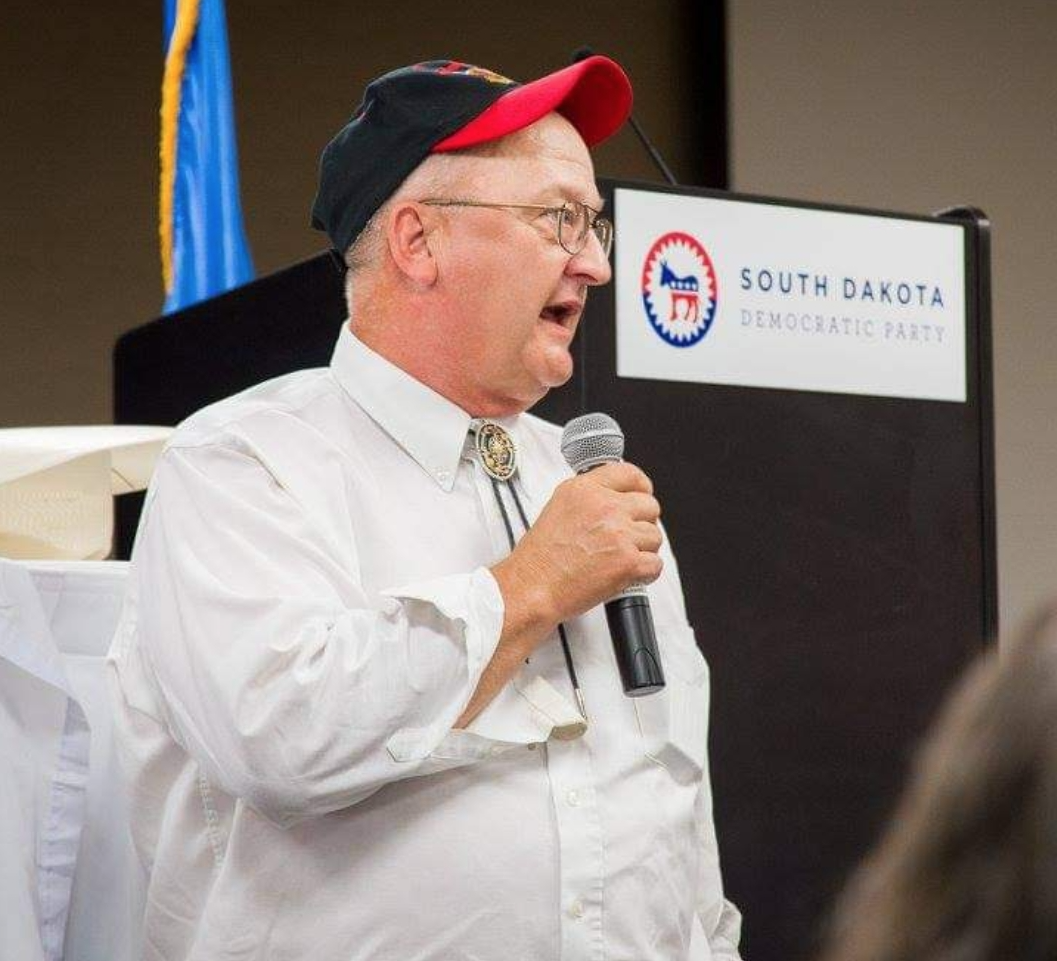

Member of the South Dakota House of Representatives from the 19th district
- In office January 11, 2011 – January 2013
- Preceded by: Jim Putnam; Bill Van Gerpen
- In office January 8, 1991 – January 14, 2003
- Succeeded by: Bill Van Gerpen

Member of the South Dakota Senate from the 19th district
- In office January 14, 2003 – January 11, 2011
- Succeeded by: Bill Van Gerpen

Personal details
- Born: September 27, 1956 (age 70) Yankton, South Dakota, U.S.
- Party: Democratic
- Spouse: Joan Novak
- Education: South Dakota State University (BS)

Frank J. Kloucek is a former Democratic member of the South Dakota House of Representatives and South Dakota Senate for District 19. He served a term in the South Dakota House from 1991 through 1993, 4 terms in the South Dakota Senate from 1993 through 2001, another term in the House from 2001 through 2003, another 4 terms in the Senate from 2003 through 2011 and another term in the South Dakota House of Representatives from 2011 through 2013. Kloucek served as the Democratic Whip for 3 terms and as the Vice-Chair of the Senate Agricultural and Natural Resources Committee in the 1993–1994 session. Following a significant change in district boundaries after the 2011 redistricting, Kloucek ran for South Dakota Senate and lost to past Republican legislator Bill Van Gerpen.
