= Steven Haugaard =

American politician

Steve Haugaard
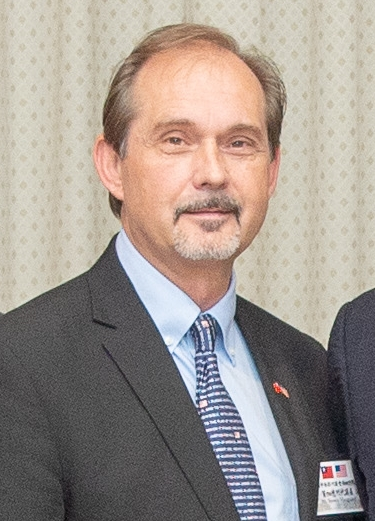

Speaker of the South Dakota House of Representatives
- In office January 8, 2019 – January 8, 2021
- Preceded by: Mark Mickelson
- Succeeded by: Spencer Gosch

Speaker pro tempore of the South Dakota House of Representatives
- In office December 6, 2017 – January 8, 2019
- Preceded by: Don Haggar
- Succeeded by: Spencer Gosch

Member of the South Dakota House of Representatives from the 10th district
- In office January 13, 2015 – 2023 Serving with Don Haggar (2015–2017), Doug Barthel (2017-2023)
- Preceded by: Jenna Haggar

Personal details
- Born: April 7, 1956 (age 70) Madison, South Dakota, U.S.
- Party: Republican
- Spouse: Mary
- Children: 8
- Education: University of South Dakota (BS); Seattle University (JD)

Steven Haugaard (born April 7, 1956) is an American politician and attorney. He has served as a Republican member for the 10th district in the South Dakota House of Representatives since 2015. He was elected Speaker of the House and served in that office from 2019 to 2021. He had been elected as Speaker pro tempore of the South Dakota House of Representatives and served in that office from 2017 to 2019.

== Early life and education ==
Haugaard graduated the University of South Dakota with a Bachelor of Science and then the University of Puget Sound School of Law for his Juris Doctor.

== Political career ==
Haugaard was elected as a Republican member for the 10th district in the South Dakota House of Representatives in 2014. He was elected Speaker of the House and served in that office from 2019 to 2021. He had been elected as Speaker pro tempore of the South Dakota House of Representatives and served in that office from 2017 to 2019.

=== Committee assignments ===
2021-2022

- House Appropriations Committee
- Joint Legislative Procedure Committee
- House Legislative Procedure Committee

2019-2020

- Joint Legislative Procedure Committee, Chair
- House Legislative Procedure Committee, Chair
- House Government Operations & Audit Committee, Vice Chair
- House State Affairs Committee

2017-2018

- Health & Human Services
- Judiciary

2015-2016

- Health & Human Services
- Judiciary

== 2022 gubernatorial election ==
On November 17, 2021, Haugaard announced that he was running for Governor of South Dakota, challenging incumbent Kristi Noem in the Republican primary. He accused Noem of being insufficiently conservative on some issues, as well as of being beholden to special interests. Haugaard was defeated by Noem 76.4% to 23.6% on June 7, 2022.

== Election history ==
- 2020 Haugaard was re-elected with 6,527 votes; Doug Barthel was also re-elected with 6,188 votes and Michelle L. Hentschel received 4,736 votes.
- 2018 Haugaard was re-elected with 5,017 votes; Doug Barthel was elected with 5,101 votes and Barbara Saxton received 3,094 votes and Dean Kurtz received 3,066 votes.
- 2016 Haugaard was re-elected with 5,838; Don Haggar was re-elected with 5,484 votes and Paul Vanderline received 3,437 votes and Dean Kurtz received 3,283 votes.
- 2014 Haugaard was elected with 3,574 votes; Don Haggar was also elected with 3,774 votes and Jo Hausman received 2,402 votes and James Wrigg received 1,769 votes.

South Dakota House of Representatives
Preceded by Don Haggar	Speaker pro tempore of South Dakota House of Representatives; 2017–2019	Succeeded by Spencer Gosch
Political offices
Preceded by Mark Mickelson	Speaker of South Dakota House of Representatives; 2019–2021	Succeeded by Spencer Gosch
