= Roger W. Hunt =

American politician and lawyer (1938–2018)

Member of the South Dakota House of Representatives from the 10th district
- In office 2015–2017 Serving with Kris Langer
- In office 2005–2012
- In office 1991–2000

Personal details
- Born: February 23, 1938 Flandreau, South Dakota, U.S.
- Died: November 9, 2018 (aged 80) Sioux Falls, South Dakota, U.S.
- Party: Republican
- Spouse: Sharon Boese
- Children: three
- Profession: lawyer

Roger Wayne Hunt (February 23, 1938 – November 9, 2018) was an American politician and lawyer. He served in the South Dakota House of Representatives from 1991 to 2000, 2005 to 2012, and 2015 to 2017. He was also speaker of the house from 1999 to 2000.

== Early life ==
Hunt was born in Flandreau, South Dakota. He received his bachelor's degree from Augustana University in 1959 and his law degree from University of South Dakota in 1962. He also received his master's degree in international law from George Washington University in 1971.

== Career ==
Hunt served in the United States Navy in the judge advocate general corps from 1962 to 1984.

Hunt served in the South Dakota House of Representatives from 1991 to 2000, 2005 to 2012, and again from 2015 to 2017. From 1999 to 2000, he served as Speaker of the House.

== Personal life ==
Hunt lived in Brandon, South Dakota. Hunt died after complications from surgery in 2018 at the age of 80.
