= Margaret Sutton (politician) =

American politician

Member of the South Dakota Senate from the 10th district
- In office January 8, 2019 – January 10, 2023
- Preceded by: Jenna Netherton
- Succeeded by: Liz Larson

Personal details
- Party: Republican

Margaret Sutton is an American politician and former Republican member of the South Dakota Senate, serving from 2019 to 2023.

== Election history ==
- 2020 Sutton was re-elected with 7,205 votes defeating Nichole Cauwels received 4,261 votes.
- 2018 Sutton was elected with 5,240 votes defeating Rachel Willson with 3,558 votes. Sutton defeated Spencer Wrightsman in the Republican primary with 772 votes and Wrightsman receiving 538 votes.
