= Greg Jamison =

American politician

Member of the South Dakota House of Representatives from the 12th district
- Incumbent
- Assumed office January 12, 2021 Serving with Arch Beal
- Preceded by: Manny Steele
- Succeeded by: Stephanie Arne (elect)

Personal details
- Party: Republican
- Education: University of South Dakota (attended)

Greg Jamison is an American politician. He has served as a Republican member for the 12th district in the South Dakota House of Representatives since 2021.

Jamison was a candidate in the 2014, 2018 and 2026 Sioux Falls mayoral races. He lost all these campaigns.

On January 7, 2026, Jamison announced his candidacy for Mayor of Sioux Falls. Jamison ultimately secured 18% of the votes in the primary election and failed to advance to the runoff. After being eliminated, he endorsed Jamie Smith for mayor, who ultimately lost the election to Republican Christine Erickson. In his announcement, Jamison said he supported law enforcement initiatives like Operation Prairie Thunder. He also stated his intention to support tax "reform, rather than relief" during the 2026 South Dakota legislative session.

Previously, he complemented his mayoral opponent, State Senator Jamie Smith as a "good guy, likable, [and] easy to work with." During the 2026 legislative session, Jamison sponsored a bill that would allow municipalities to create new sales taxes.

== Election history ==
- 2020 Jamison was elected with 6,799 votes; Rep. Arch Beal was also re-elected with 5,621 votes and Erin Royer received 5,555 votes.

2020 South Dakota House of Representatives District 12 General election
Party	Candidate	Votes	%
Republican	Greg Jamison	6,799	37.82%
Republican	Arch Beal (incumbent)	5,621	31.27%
Democratic	Erin Royer	5,555	30.90%
Total votes		17,975	100.0%
Republican hold			
Republican hold			

2022 South Dakota House of Representatives District 12 General election
Party	Candidate	Votes	%
Republican	Greg Jamison (incumbent)	4,674	28.45%
Republican	Amber Arlint	4,651	28.31%
Democratic	Erin Royer	3,626	22.07%
Democratic	Kristin Hayward	3,479	21.17%
Total votes		16,430	100.00%
Republican hold			
Republican hold			

2024 South Dakota House of Representatives District 12 General election
Party	Candidate	Votes	%
Republican	Amber Arlint (incumbent)	6,257	31%
Republican	Greg Jamison (incumbent)	5,961	30%
Democratic	Erin Royer	4,414	22%
Democratic	JR Anderson	3,535	18%
Total votes		20,167	100%
Republican hold			
Republican hold			
