= Tommy Brunner =

Austrian snowboarder (1970–2006)

Tommy Brunner (1970 in Innsbruck – 21 April 2006 in Bella Coola, British Columbia, Canada) was an Austrian big mountain snowboarding legend. He died in an avalanche in April 2006, just 2 weeks after the release of a computer game by Bongfish Interactive Entertainment dedicated to him called Stoked Rider.

== Death ==
On April 21, 2006, Brunner was part of a group filming a snowboarding movie in the Coast Mountains in British Columbia's Bella Coola region.

He was swept away by an avalanche he had triggered while snowboarding and was buried 4 to 5 meters deep. Despite a quick signal location via transceiver, rescue efforts were hindered by the burial depth in the challenging terrain. Emergency crews took him to Bella Coola General Hospital, but he could not be revived. Brunner was pronounced dead at 4:30 p.m.

A 2011 German-language short film honors his memory.
