= Casey Murschel =

American politician

Member of the South Dakota House of Representatives from the 12th district
- In office January 9, 2001 – January 9, 2007
- Preceded by: William F. Earley; John R. McIntyre
- Succeeded by: Manny Steele

Personal details
- Born: June 11, 1951 (age 73); Sioux Falls, South Dakota
- Political party: Republican

Casey Murschel (born June 11, 1951) is an American politician who served in the South Dakota House of Representatives from the 12th district from 2001 to 2007.
