= Arch Beal =

American politician

Member of the South Dakota Senate from the 12th district
- Incumbent
- Assumed office January 10, 2023
- Preceded by: Blake Curd

Member of the South Dakota House of Representatives from the 12th district
- In office January 13, 2015 – January 10, 2023 Serving with Greg Jamison
- Preceded by: Hal Wick; Manny Steele
- Succeeded by: Amber Arlint

Personal details
- Born: February 23, 1955 (age 71)
- Party: Republican
- Profession: Business Owner

Arch E. Beal (born February 23, 1955) is an American politician in the South Dakota Senate. He has served as a Republican member for the 12th district in the South Dakota House of Representatives since 2015.

== Election history ==
2020 South Dakota House of Representatives District 12 General election
Party	Candidate	Votes	%
Republican	Greg Jamison	6,799	37.82%
Republican	Arch Beal (incumbent)	5,621	31.27%
Democratic	Erin Royer	5,555	30.90%
Total votes		17,975	100.0%
Republican hold			
Republican hold			
