= James E. Putnam =

American politician

Jim Putnam

Member of the South Dakota Senate from the 19th district
- In office 2001–2002
- Preceded by: Frank Kloucek
- Succeeded by: Frank Kloucek
- In office 2011–2012
- Preceded by: Frank Kloucek
- Succeeded by: Bill Van Gerpen

Member of the South Dakota House of Representatives from the 18th district
- In office 1987–2000
- In office 2003–2010

Personal details
- Born: April 18, 1940 (age 86) Armour, South Dakota
- Party: Republican
- Profession: Promotional sales, farmer

James E. Putnam (born April 18, 1940) was an American politician in the state of South Dakota. He was a member of the South Dakota House of Representatives and South Dakota State Senate. He was Majority Whip of the House from 1993 to 1996.
