= Oran Sorenson =

American politician

Member of the South Dakota House of Representatives from the 25th district
- In office January 13, 2009 – January 11, 2011
- Preceded by: Dan Ahlers
- Succeeded by: Jon Hansen; Stace Nelson

Personal details
- Born: February 7, 1952 (age 74) Sioux Falls, South Dakota
- Party: Democratic

Oran Sorenson (born February 7, 1952) is an American politician who served in the South Dakota House of Representatives from the 25th district from 2009 to 2011.
