= Ralph Nachtigal =

American politician

Member of the South Dakota House of Representatives
- In office 1977–1980

Personal details
- Born: December 7, 1933
- Died: November 22, 2014 (aged 80)
- Party: Democratic
- Education: South Dakota State University

Ralph Nachtigal (December 7, 1933 – November 22, 2014) was an American politician. He served as a Democratic member of the South Dakota House of Representatives.

== Life and career ==
Nachtigal attended South Dakota State University.

Nachtigal served in the South Dakota House of Representatives from 1977 to 1980.

Nachtigal died on November 22, 2014, at the age of 80.
