= Thomas J. Brunner =

American politician

Member of the South Dakota House of Representatives from the 29th district
- In office 2015 – January 12, 2021
- Preceded by: Gary Cammack
- Succeeded by: Dean Wink
- In office 2005–2013
- Succeeded by: Gary Cammack

Personal details
- Born: February 28, 1958 (age 68) Belle Fourche, South Dakota
- Party: Republican
- Spouse: Quin Brunner
- Children: 7

Thomas J. Brunner (born February 28, 1958) is a South Dakota politician, and served in the South Dakota House of Representatives from 2005 to 2013 and from 2015 to 2021.

Brunner was born on February 28, 1958, in Belle Fourche, South Dakota. He currently has a wife, 7 kids and practices Christianity.
