= Mitch Fargen =

American politician

Member of the South Dakota House of Representatives from the 8th district
- In office January 13, 2009 – January 8, 2013
- Preceded by: David Gassman; Russell Olson
- Succeeded by: Leslie Heinemann; Scott Parsley

Personal details
- Born: April 12, 1983 (age 43) Flandreau, South Dakota
- Party: Democratic

Mitch Fargen (born April 12, 1983) is an American politician who served in the South Dakota House of Representatives from the 8th district from 2009 to 2013.
