= Mary Glenski =

American politician (born 1930)

Member of the South Dakota House of Representatives from the 15 district
- In office 2001–2008

Personal details
- Born: August 31, 1930 (age 96) Denver, Colorado
- Party: Democratic
- Spouse: Jim
- Education: Benedictine College, South Dakota State University
- Profession: Educator

Mary H. Glenski (born August 31, 1930) is a former Democratic member of the South Dakota House of Representatives, representing District 15 from 2001 to 2008. She did not run in 2008 because she had reached the term limits for South Dakota.

Glenski is a retired school guidance counselor. She resides in the Cathedral Historic District in Sioux Falls.
