= Bill Van Gerpen =

American politician (born 1949)

Member of the South Dakota Senate from the 19th district
- Incumbent
- Assumed office January 8, 2013
- Preceded by: Jim Putnam

Member of the South Dakota House of Representatives from the 19th district
- In office January 2009 – January 2011 Serving with Jim Putnam
- Preceded by: Gary Jerke
- Succeeded by: Edward Van Gerpen

Member of the South Dakota House of Representatives from the 19th district
- In office January 2001 – January 2007 Serving with Frank Kloucek (2001–2003); Jim Putnam (2003–2007)
- Preceded by: Richard Wudel
- Succeeded by: Gary Jerke

Member of the South Dakota House of Representatives from the 19th district
- In office January 1997 – January 1999 Serving with Jim Putnam
- Preceded by: Edward Van Gerpen
- Succeeded by: Richard Wudel

Personal details
- Born: March 16, 1949 (age 77) Scotland, South Dakota, U.S.
- Party: Republican
- Education: Southern State College; Southwestern Baptist Theological Seminary

Military service
- Branch/service: Air National Guard
- Years of service: Chaplain; 1988–2006
- Rank: Lieutenant Colonel

Bill L. Van Gerpen (born March 16, 1949, in Scotland, South Dakota) is an American politician and a Republican member of the South Dakota Senate representing District 19 since January 8, 2013. Van Gerpen served several non-consecutive periods in the South Dakota Legislature from January 1997 until January 1999 from January 2001 until January 2007, and from January 2009 until January 2011 in the South Dakota House of Representatives District 19 seat.

== Education ==
Van Gerpen earned his BSE in social science from Southern State College (later the University of South Dakota–Springfield) and his Master of Divinity from Southwestern Baptist Theological Seminary.

== Elections ==
When House District 19 incumbent Republican representative Edward Van Gerpen ran for South Dakota Senate, Bill Van Gerpen and incumbent representative Putnam were unopposed for the 1996 Republican primary, in the four-way November 5, 1996, general election, Van Gerpen took the first seat with 5,236 votes (30.66%) and fellow Republican nominee Jim Putnam took the second seat ahead of Democratic nominees Susan Paul and LaVern Aisenbrey.

To challenge incumbent Democratic Senator Frank Kloucek, Van Gerpen was unopposed for the 1998 Republican primary but lost the November 3, 1998, general election to Senator Kloucek.

When incumbent representative Putnam ran for South Dakota Senate, Van Gerpen ran in the four-way June 6, 2000, Republican primary and placed first with 1,607 votes (43.5%); in the four-way November 7, 2000, general election Democratic Senator Frank Kloucek took the first seat and Van Gerpen took the second seat with 5,374 votes (34.1%) ahead of fellow Republican representative Richard Wudel and Democratic nominee Wahnel Ulmer.

With incumbent representative Frank Kloucek running for South Dakota Senate and leaving a House District 19 seat open, Van Gerpen and Jim Putnam were unopposed for the June 4, 2002, Republican primary; in the three-way November 5, 2002, general election Van Gerpen took the first seat with 5,964 votes (41.1%) and Representative Putnam took the second seat ahead of Democratic nominee Leroy Zeeb, who had run for the Senate in 2000.

Van Gerpen and Representative Putnam were unopposed for both the June 1, 2004, Republican primary and the November 2, 2004, general election where Van Gerpen took the first seat with 6,769 votes (54.2%) and Representative Putnam took the second seat after two Democratic candidates withdrew.

Van Gerpen and Representative Putnam were unopposed for the June 3, 2008, Republican primary when Representative Jerke withdrew; and won the five-way November 4, 2008, general election where Van Gerpen took the first seat with 5,661 votes (35.4%) and Representative Putnam took the second seat ahead of Democratic nominees Glennis Stern, Travis Lape, and independent candidate Richard Hall.

When incumbent Senate District 22 Republican Senator Jim Putnam ran for House District 19 and left the District 19 seat open, Van Gerpen was unopposed for the June 5, 2012, Republican primary and won the November 6, 2012, general election with 7,024 votes (60%) against Democratic Representative and former Senator Frank Kloucek.
