= Harlan Van Gerpen =

American politician (1924–2012)

Member of the Iowa House of Representatives from the 24th district
- In office January 10, 1983 – January 13, 1985
- Preceded by: Victor Stueland
- Succeeded by: Jane Teaford

Personal details
- Born: June 18, 1924 Avon, South Dakota
- Died: October 21, 2012 (aged 88) Cedar Falls, Iowa
- Party: Republican

Harlan Welbert Van Gerpen (June 18, 1924 – October 21, 2012) was an American politician who served in the Iowa House of Representatives from the 24th district from 1983 to 1985.

He died on October 21, 2012, in Cedar Falls, Iowa at age 88.
