= Susy Blake =

American politician

Member of the South Dakota House of Representatives from the 13th district
- In office 2009–2012

Susan Blake is an American politician from the state of South Dakota.

Blake served in the South Dakota House of Representatives for District 13 from 2009 to 2012. She was the Democratic Party's nominee for Lieutenant Governor of South Dakota in the 2014 gubernatorial election.

Blake lives in Sioux Falls, South Dakota.

Party political offices
Preceded by Ben Arndt	Democratic nominee for Lieutenant Governor of South Dakota; 2014	Succeeded by Michelle Lavallee
