= Doug Barthel =

Politician in the South Dakota State House

Member of the South Dakota House of Representatives from the 10th district
- In office 2017–2023 Serving with Steven Haugaard (2017-present)

Personal details
- Party: Republican
- Spouse: Patty
- Children: 2

Doug Barthel is an American politician and former law enforcement officer who served as a member of the South Dakota House of Representatives from the 10th district from 2017 to 2023.

== Career ==
Barthel served as the police chief in the Sioux Falls Police Department. He also worked as a public affairs specialist at Sanford Health.

Barthel was elected to the South Dakota House of Representatives in 2016 and assumed office in 2017. He was re-elected in 2018 & 2020. Barthel was a member of the House Judiciary Committee and House Local Government Committee. He left office in 2023.
