= University of South Dakota–Springfield =

Public university in Springfield, South Dakota, US (1881–1984)

University of South Dakota at Springfield
- Former names: Southern State Normal School (1881–1947); Southern State Teachers College (1947–1964); Southern State College (1964–1971)
- Type: State supported
- Active: 1881; 145 years ago – 1984; 42 years ago
- Location: Springfield, South Dakota, United States; 42°51′34″N 97°53′57″W
- Campus: Rural
- Colors: Red and white
- Mascot: The Pointer

The University of South Dakota at Springfield was a state-supported college in Springfield, South Dakota. It was founded in 1881 and closed in 1984. The university had numerous names, including the Southern State Normal School, the Southern State Teachers College, and Southern State College.

== History ==
This state-supported university started as Southern State Normal School in 1881 in what is now Springfield, South Dakota. It was established to fill the need for teachers in the Dakota Territory. It opened with 32 students.

It became Southern State Teachers College in 1947, around the time the college added vocational courses such as automotive mechanics, business, cabinet making, interior decorating, and sheet metal work. Its enrollment was nearly 400 students in 1955.

It became Southern State College in 1964. In the later 1960s, its enrollment exceeded 1,000 students. It became the University of South Dakota at Springfield in 1971.

University of South Dakota at Springfield ceased operations in July 1984. The university was financially viable but was less than an hour's drive to the University of South Dakota. At the time, South Dakota had a shortage of prison facililities, and determined this was better use of the college campus. The university had 320 students in its last graduating class.

The campus was converted into the Mike Durfee State Prison in December 1984, named for a star athlete and teacher at the school. Artifacts and archival materials related to the former university are collected and displayed at The Springfield College Museum.

== Campus ==
University of South Dakota at Springfield was located in Springfield, South Dakota, a small town with a population of less than 1,000 people. The campus had an agricultural setting.

Completed in 1896, Main Hall was the only building on the college's campus until 1901. Main Hall was designed by architect Wallace L. Dow and was constructed of Sioux Falls quartzite and was trimmed in Black Hills sandstone, a design style that was also used for additional buildings. A women's dormitory, Summit Hall, was added in 1904, followed by Science Hall in 1911. Science Hall included a gymnasium on its top floor.

Main Hall was listed on the National Register of Historic Places in 1981. Summit Hall was demolished in 1984, followed by Main Hall in 2004.

== Student life ==
Students published The Pulse newspaper and a yearbook called The Pointer. It had a chapter of Pi Kappa Delta, an honor society and organization for intercollegiate debaters and public speakers.

== Athletics ==
The mascot of the University of South Dakota at Springfield was the pointer. Its colors were red and white. The college had a football team and a women's basketball team. It played in the South Dakota Intercollegiate Conference, from 1917 to 1984.

== Notable people ==
=== Alumni ===
- Lance Carson, South Dakota House of Representatives
- Arthur Exon, United States Air Force general
- Jack Martin, college football, basketball, and track and field coach and college athletics administrator
- Dwite Pedersen, Nebraska Legislature
- Duane Ticknor, former assistant coach for the Memphis Grizzlies and a former headcoach for the Fort Wayne Mad Ants, Sioux Falls Skyforce, and Sacramento Kings
- Jess Tjeerdsma, South Dakota Senate
- Mel Tjeerdsma, a national championship-winning football coach at Northwest Missouri State University
- Bill Van Gerpen, South Dakota Senate

=== Faculty and staff ===
- William L. Carberry, head football coach and director of athletics in 1923 and from 1926 to 1932
- Jack Martin, basketball, track, and head football coach at Southern State Teachers College from 1946 to 1966
- Vincent E. Montgomery, head football coach Southern State Normal School from 1933 to 1942
