= Gene G. Abdallah =

American politician (1936–2019)

Member of the South Dakota Senate from the 10th district
- In office 2002–2010
- Preceded by: Dave Munson
- Succeeded by: Shantel Krebs

Member of the South Dakota House of Representatives from the 10th district
- In office 2001–2002; 2011–2012

Personal details
- Born: July 16, 1936 Sioux Falls, South Dakota, U.S.
- Died: November 2, 2019 (aged 83) Sioux Falls, South Dakota, U.S.
- Party: Republican
- Spouse: Judy
- Children: 3
- Profession: Highway Patrol/U.S. Marshal

Gene George Abdallah (June 16, 1936 – November 2, 2019) was an American politician. He served in the South Dakota House of Representatives from 2001 to 2002 as well as 2011 to 2012 and in the Senate from 2002 to 2010.

Abdallah served in the South Dakota Air National Guard from 1954 to 1962. He served in the Minnehaha County Sheriff's Department and was the chief deputy sheriff. Abdallah worked for the SoDak Distributors in Sioux Falls. He also was the superintendent of the South Dakota Highway Patrol and a United States marshal. He died in Sioux Falls in 2019, aged 83.
