= Scott Parsley =

American politician

Member of the South Dakota Senate from the 8th district
- In office 2015–2017
- Succeeded by: Jordan Youngberg

Member of the South Dakota House of Representatives from the 8th district
- In office January 11, 2013 – 2015

Personal details
- Born: October 22, 1952 (age 74) Brookings, South Dakota, U.S.
- Party: Democratic
- Website: scottparsleyforhouse.com

Scott Leo Parsley (born October 22, 1952) is an American politician and a Democratic member of the South Dakota Senate representing District 8 since January 11, 2013.

== Elections ==
- 2014 After serving two years in the South Dakota House of Representatives, Scott ran for election in the South Dakota State Senate. He won against Chuck Jones, who had formerly been appointed to the seat by Governor Dennis Daugaard after incumbent Russ Olson resigned to pursue career other opportunities.
- 2012 With District 8 incumbent Democratic Representative Mitch Fargen redistricted to District 15, Parsley ran in the June 5, 2012 Democratic Primary; in the four-way November 6, 2012 General election, Parsley took the first seat with 6,069 votes (30.60%) and Republican nominee Leslie Heinemann took the second seat ahead of Democratic nominee Roy Lindsey and fellow Republican nominee Gene Kroger (who had been selected to replace incumbent Representative Patrician Stricherz after she withdrew).
- 2008 When Senate District 8 incumbent Democratic Senator Dan Sutton was term limited and left the seat open, Parsley was unopposed for the June 3, 2008 Democratic Primary but lost the November 4, 2008 General election to Republican Representative Russell Olson.
