= Kathy Miles =

American politician

Member of the South Dakota Senate from the 15th district
- In office 2009–2011
- Succeeded by: Angie Buhl

Member of the South Dakota House of Representatives from the 15th district
- In office 2003–2009

Personal details
- Born: January 30, 1950 (age 76)
- Party: Democratic
- Spouse: Jim
- Profession: registered nurse

Kathleen "Kathy" Miles (born January 30, 1950) is an American politician who served in both houses of the South Dakota Legislature. A Democrat, she represented District 15 in the South Dakota House of Representatives from 2003 to 2009. She then served a single term in the South Dakota Senate (2009 to 2011) before being defeated for re-election in the Democratic primary held on June 8, 2010. In that contest, Miles received 276 votes while Angie Buhl received 398.
