= Edward Van Gerpen =

American politician

Member of the South Dakota House of Representatives from the 19th district
- In office 2011–2012
- In office 1993–1996
- In office 1985–1988

Personal details
- Born: March 23, 1938 (age 88) Avon, South Dakota
- Party: Republican
- Spouse: Sharon Heusinkueld
- Profession: farmer

Edward E. Van Gerpen (born March 23, 1938) is an American former politician. He has served as a Republican member in the South Dakota House of Representatives from 1985 to 1988, 1993 to 1996, and 2011 to 2012.
