= National Register of Historic Places listings in Roberts County, South Dakota =

Location of Roberts County in South Dakota

This is a list of the National Register of Historic Places listings in Roberts County, South Dakota.

This is intended to be a complete list of the properties and districts on the National Register of Historic Places in Roberts County, South Dakota, United States. The locations of National Register properties and districts for which the latitude and longitude coordinates are included below, may be seen in a map.

There are 16 properties and districts listed on the National Register in the county.

This National Park Service list is complete through NPS recent listings posted March 14, 2025.

== Current listings ==
	Name on the Register	Image	Date listed	Location	City or town	Description
1	Archaeological Site 39RO0073		August 12, 2024 (#100008360)	Address Restricted	Sisseton vicinity	
2	Brown's Post		May 27, 1988 (#88000583)	Address Restricted	Sisseton	
3	Hart School No. 3	Hart School No. 3	August 16, 2000 (#00000994)	Route 1; 45°45′14″N 96°53′47″W	Sisseton	
4	Knapp Ranch	Knapp Ranch	April 14, 2005 (#05000282)	13168 450th Avenue; 45°28′33″N 97°12′18″W	Ortley	
5	New Effington Hospital	New Effington Hospital	July 13, 1989 (#89000829)	Oddin Avenue; 45°51′14″N 96°55′05″W	New Effington	
6	New Effington Rest Stop Tipi	New Effington Rest Stop Tipi	January 14, 2015 (#14001189)	Mile 250.8 on I-29; 45°54′28″N 96°51′51″W	New Effington	
7	Louis Nigg Barn		March 1, 2021 (#100006065)	46356 125th St. 45°34′17″N 97°02′48″W	Sisseton	
8	Robar Trading Post		May 27, 1988 (#88000582)	Hartford Beach State Park; 45°24′09″N 96°39′13″W	Wilmot	
9	Roberts County Courthouse	Roberts County Courthouse	December 12, 1976 (#76001755)	411 Second Avenue East; 45°39′47″N 97°02′41″W	Sisseton	
10	Sisseton Agency Headquarters & Wacipi Grounds		February 1, 2022 (#100007395)	45744 BIA Hwy. 706; 45°33′45″N 97°04′17″W	Agency Village	
11	Sisseton Carnegie Library	Sisseton Carnegie Library	October 24, 1996 (#96001227)	215 Oak Street, East; 45°39′54″N 97°02′51″W	Sisseton	
12	Sisseton School	Sisseton School	November 23, 2020 (#100005818)	302 East Maple St. 45°39′49″N 97°02′50″W	Sisseton	
13	Site 39RO71		June 8, 2005 (#05000588)	Address Restricted	Sisseton	Also known as Thunderbird Rock
14	South Dakota Department of Transportation Bridge No. 55-030-418	South Dakota Department of Transportation Bridge No. 55-030-418	December 9, 1999 (#99001437)	State railroad tracks over a local road 45°19′49″N 97°09′55″W	Ortley	
15	Andrew and Mary Stavig House	Andrew and Mary Stavig House	November 7, 1997 (#97001392)	112 First Avenue, West; 45°39′41″N 97°03′09″W	Sisseton	
16	Walla Lutheran Church	Walla Lutheran Church	May 19, 2004 (#04000470)	46532 105th Street; 45°51′56″N 96°53′22″W	New Effington	

== See also ==
- List of National Historic Landmarks in South Dakota
- National Register of Historic Places listings in South Dakota
