= Agency Township, Roberts County, South Dakota =

Agency Township, South Dakota
- Township
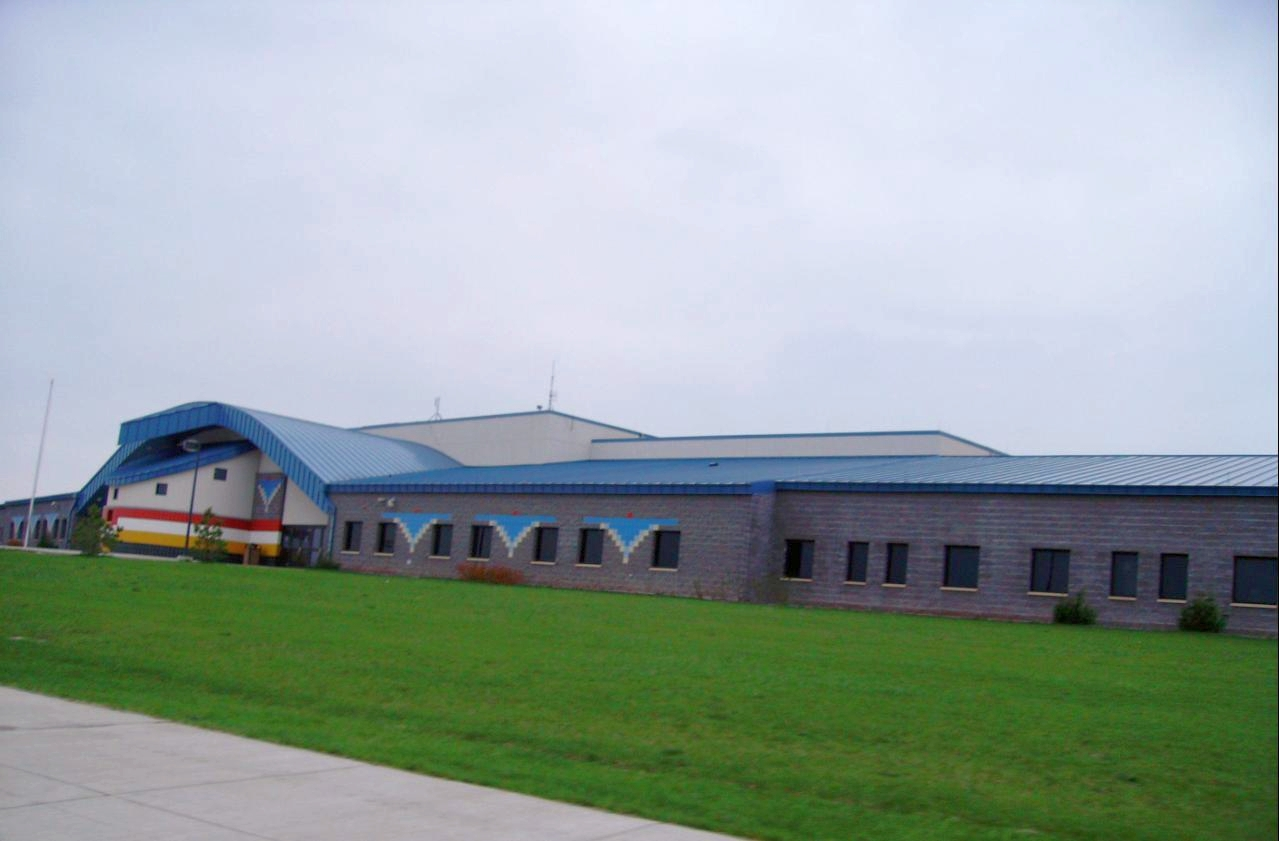
- Tiospa Zina Tribal School, located in Agency Village

- Location within South Dakota Location within the United States
- Coordinates: 45°30′10″N 97°1′33″W
- Country: United States
- State: South Dakota
- County: Roberts

Area
  - Total: 36.0 sq mi (93.2 km^{2})
  - Land: 35.9 sq mi (93.0 km^{2})
  - Water: 0.077 sq mi (0.2 km^{2})
- Elevation: 1,512 ft (461 m)

Population (2000)
  - Total: 277
  - Density: 7.8/sq mi (3/km^{2})
- Time zone: UTC-6 (Central (CST))
  - Summer (DST): UTC-5 (CDT)
- Area code: 605
- FIPS code: 46-00500
- GNIS feature ID: 1268566

Agency Township is a township in Roberts County, South Dakota, United States. The township is part of the Lake Traverse Reservation, which is home to the Sisseton Wahpeton Oyate Indian tribe. The tribe's headquarters at Agency Village are in the township, as is Sisseton Wahpeton College. Its population at the 2020 Census was 297.

== Demographics ==
As of the 2000 Census, there were 277 people, 83 households, and 70 families residing in the township. There were 98 housing units total. The racial makeup of the city was 71.8% Native American, 26.0% White, and 2.2% from two or more races.
