= Paul War Cloud =

Native American artist

- Born: June 18, 1930; Sisseton, South Dakota
- Died: December 17, 1973 (aged 43)
- Other names: Paul WarCloud Grant

Paul War Cloud (June 18, 1930 – December 17, 1973) was a Sisseton-Wahpeton author and artist. His work depicts Dakota traditions and heritage.

== Early life and career ==
Born on the Lake Traverse Reservation near Sica Hollow, War Cloud received his high school education from Stephan Mission School in Stephan, South Dakota. He was self-taught and did not receive a formal art education.

In 1971, War Cloud published the Dakotah Sioux Indian Dictionary, a manual containing over 4,000 words in the Dakota language. The same year, he was commissioned by South Dakota Governor Richard Kneip for a mural to replace Edwin Blashfield's "Progress of South Dakota," which depicted a woman treading on Native Americans, in the State Capitol. War Cloud's mural, titled "Unity through the Great Spirit," was unveiled in 1972. As of 2025, it is displayed at the South Dakota Cultural Heritage Center in Pierre.

After the death of Oblate Father John Pohlen in 1969, War Cloud helped found the Pohlen Cultural Center, a collection of Native American art, where he completed an artist residency. The center was listed as the Sisseton Carnegie Library on the National Register of Historic Places in 1996.

War Cloud's artworks are on display throughout South Dakota, including in the Roberts County Courthouse, the South Dakota Art Museum, and the Tekakwitha Fine Arts Center in Sisseton.
