= KXSW =

- Sisseton, South Dakota; United States
- Broadcast area: Lake Traverse Indian Reservation
- Frequency: 89.9 MHz

Programming
- Format: Community radio

Ownership
- Owner: Corporation For Native Broadcasting

Technical information
- Licensing authority: FCC
- Facility ID: 171940
- Class: A
- ERP: 1,000 watts
- HAAT: −5 meters (−16 ft)
- Transmitter coordinates: 45°33′48″N 97°3′35″W

Links
- Public license information: Public file; LMS
- Webcast: Listen live
- Website: kxsw899fm.wix.com/dakota

KXSW (89.9 FM) is a Community radio station licensed to Sisseton, South Dakota and serving the Lake Traverse Indian Reservation. The station is owned by the Corporation For Native Broadcasting.

== See also ==
- List of community radio stations in the United States
