= Angelique EagleWoman =

American lawyer

- Wambdi Awanwicake WasteWin
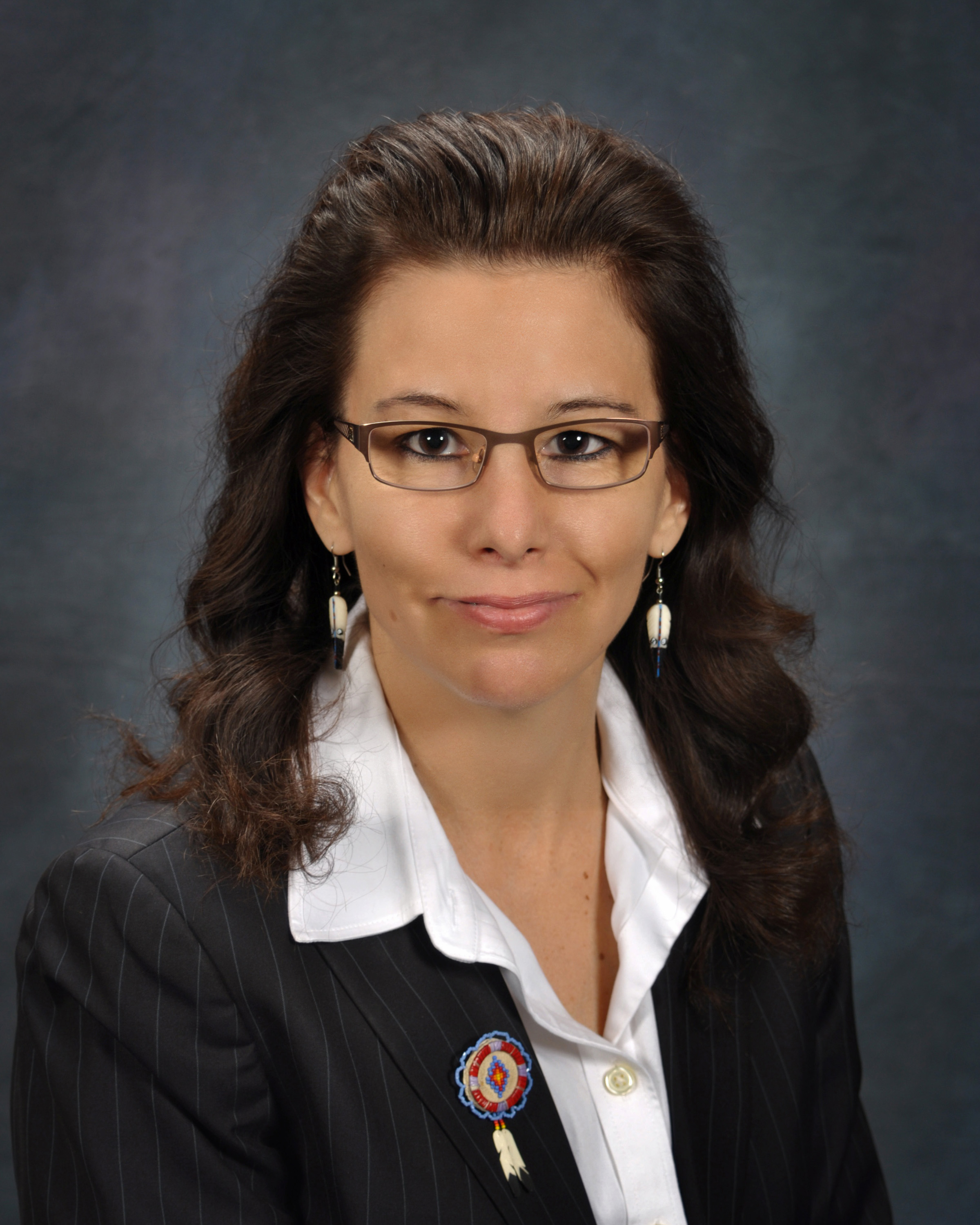
- EagleWoman in 2016
- Born: December 1, 1969 (age 56)
- Citizenship: Sisseton-Wahpeton Oyate of the Lake Traverse Reservation • American
- Education: Stanford University (BA); University of North Dakota (JD); University of Tulsa (LLM)
- Occupation: Legal scholar
- Known for: First Aboriginal person appointed as a dean of a Canadian law school.
- Website: angeliqueeaglewoman.com

Angelique EagleWoman (Dakota: Wambdi Awanwicake WasteWin; born 1969) is a Dakota law professor and scholar of Indigenous law. She is a citizen of the Sisseton-Wahpeton Dakota Oyate of the Lake Traverse Reservation. EagleWoman was the Dean of the Bora Laskin Faculty of Law at Lakehead University in Thunder Bay, Ontario, Canada from 2016 until she stepped down in June 2018, alleging issues of systemic racism leading to constructive dismissal.

She holds a law professor position and is the director of the Native American Law and Sovereignty (NALS) Institute at the Mitchell Hamline School of Law in St. Paul, Minnesota.

== Early life and influences ==
Angelique EagleWoman was born in Topeka, Kansas. During her childhood years in Kansas, she was raised mostly in a single-parent household by her mother; her family, including a brother, faced poverty conditions. When she was 8 years old, she watched her aunt and uncle on television after they won a lawsuit against the Shawnee County Sheriff's department for brutally beating her uncle, an African-American, when he went to pay a speeding ticket.

As a teenager, she moved with her father and brother to her home reservation, the Lake Traverse Reservation of the Sisseton-Wahpeton Oyate. Her grandmother, Ramona (DeCoteau) Washington and her father, Stephen L. Jackson Sr., both attended mandatory government boarding schools in South Dakota. When she was 15 years old, she received her woman's name in the Dakota language of Wambdi Awanwicake Was'teWinyan in a family ceremony on her reservation.

As a young woman, she was mentored by Roger Jourdain, former chairman of the Red Lake Band of Chippewa Indians, and a strong sovereignty advocate for Indigenous nations.

== Career ==
EagleWoman taught at the University of Idaho College of Law, established the Native American Law Emphasis Program, held a position in the law faculty at Hamline University School of Law teaching Native American Law and Contracts, and a visiting position at the University of Kansas School of Law and in the master's degree program, Indigenous Nation Studies. Her classes focus on tribal economic development, legal code development, litigation, contract law, and international Indigenous law.

During the 2017-2018 academic year, EagleWoman taught all of the first-year students in two sections of the mandatory Indigenous Legal Traditions fall course and taught the entire second-year class of students in the mandatory Aboriginal Legal Issues course to ensure that the courses were taught by an Indigenous legal academic.

Several times, EagleWoman has served on the board for the National Native American Bar Association. Additionally, she holds memberships with the District of Columbia, Oklahoma, and South Dakota Bar Associations. Of particular note is her time serving as General Counsel to the Sisseton-Wahpeton Dakota Oyate, working as an associate attorney with Sonosky, Chambers, Sachse and Endreson in Washington D.C., and her work as a Tribal Public Defender for the Kaw Nation and the Ponca Tribe of Indians of Oklahoma.

On January 12, 2016, the Bora Laskin Faculty of Law at Lakehead University announced that EagleWoman would be the new Dean of Law. Her tenure, which began in May 2016, made her the first Indigenous law dean in Canada. Her appointment was welcomed by the Indigenous legal community, including the Indigenous Bar Association. In June 2018, EagleWoman stepped down from her position citing systemic racism in the university and the law school.

She currently is a law professor at the Mitchell Hamline School of Law in St. Paul, MN where she directs the Native American Law and Sovereignty (NALS) Institute and teaches civil procedure.

== Education and awards ==
EagleWoman has her BA in political science from Stanford University, her JD from the University of North Dakota School of Law with distinction, her LLM from the University of Tulsa College of Law, with honours, studying American Indian and Indigenous Law.

During the spring of 2008, EagleWoman received the Kansas University Center for Indigenous Nation's Crystal Eagle Award. This award was for recognition of her leadership and dedication in helping members and students in Indigenous communities. Other awards include:

- Martin Luther King Jr. Award, 3rd Annual "For Service to the Spiritual Life of the University of North Dakota" (January 14, 2000)
- Kansas University Center for Indigenous Nation's Crystal Eagle Award (2008)
- William F. and Joan L. Boyd Excellence in Teaching Award (January 2010)
- One of twelve national Emerging Scholars by Diverse Issues in Higher Education (January 7, 2010)
- Recognition as Distinguished Alumni Scholar by Stanford University (May 2010)
- Inspirational Faculty Award by the University of Idaho Office of Alumni Relations (December 2010)
- Allan G. Shepard Distinguished Professor at the College of Law (2011-2012)
- Named one of 9 Notable Women Who Rule American Indian Law by Indian Country Today (October 2013)
- University of Idaho Athena Woman of the Year Award for Faculty (April 2014)
- University of Idaho College of Law Diversity & Human Rights Award (2016)
- University of Idaho Dr. Arthur Maxwell Taylor Excellence in Diversity Award (2016)
- Federal Bar Association, Indian Law Section, Recognition for Service (2016)

== Works ==
- EagleWoman, Angelique, "Envisioning Indigenous Community Courts to Realize Justice in Canada for First Nations" (April 16, 2019). Alberta Law Review, Vol. 56, No. 3, 2019
- EagleWoman, Angelique and Rice, G. William, "American Indian Children and U.S. Indian Policy" (March 9, 2016). Tribal Law Journal, Vol. 2015-2016.
- EagleWoman, Angelique, "The Ongoing Traumatic Experience of Genocide for American Indians and Alaska Natives in the United States: The Call to Recognize Full Human Rights as Set Forth in the UN Declaration on the Rights of Indigenous Peoples", (2015), American Indian Law Journal, Vol. III, Issue II, Spring 2015
- EagleWoman, Angelique,"Balancing between Two Worlds: A Dakota Woman's Reflections on Being a Law Professor", (2014)
- EagleWoman, Angelique and Leeds, Stacy, Mastering American Indian Law. (Carolina Academic Press 2013)
- EagleWoman, Angelique, "Wintertime for the Sisseton-Wahpeton Oyate: Over One Hundred Fifty Years of Human Rights Violations by the United States and the Need for a Reconciliation Involving International Indigenous Human Rights Norms", (2013), William Mitchell Law Review, Vol. 39, No. 2, 2013
- EagleWoman, Angelique, "Bringing Balance to Mid-North America: Re-Structuring the Sovereign Relationships between Tribal Nations and the United States", (2012), University of Baltimore Law Review, Vol. 41, No. 1, 2012
- EagleWoman, Angelique, "Cultural and Economic Self-Determination for Tribal Peoples in the United States Supported by the UN Declaration on the Rights of Indigenous Peoples", (2010), Pace Environmental Law (PELR) Review, Vol. 28, No. 1, 2010
- EagleWoman, Angelique, "A Constitutional Crisis When the U.S. Supreme Court Acts in a Legislative Manner? An Essay Offering a Perspective on Judicial Activism in Federal Indian Law and Federal Civil Procedure Pleading Standards", (2010), Penn State Law Review Penn Statim, Vol. 114, No. 41, 2010
- EagleWoman, Angelique, "Tribal Nations and Tribalist Economics: The Historical and Contemporary Impacts of Intergenerational Material Poverty and Cultural Wealth within the United States", (2010), Washburn Law Journal, Vol. 49, 2010
- EagleWoman, Angelique, "Tribal Hunting and Fishing Lifeways & Tribal-State Relations in Idaho", (2009), Idaho Law Review, Vol. 46, No. 1, 2009
- EagleWoman, Angelique, "The Eagle and the Condor of the Western Hemisphere: Application of International Indigenous Principles to Halt the United States Border Wall", (2009), Idaho Law Review, Vol. 45, No. 3, pp. 1–18, 2009
- EagleWoman, Angelique, "Tribal Nation Economics: Rebuilding Commercial Prosperity in Spite of U.S. Trade Restraints - Recommendations for Economic Revitalization in Indian Country", (2009), Tulsa Law Review, Vol. 44, No. 1, pp. 383–426, 2009
- EagleWoman, Angelique, "Fencing Off the Eagle and the Condor, Border Politics, and Indigenous Peoples", (2008), ABA Section of Environment, Energy and Resources: Natural Resources & Environment, Vol. 23, No. 2, p. 33, Fall 2008
- EagleWoman, Angelique, "Tribal Values of Taxation within the Tribalist Economic Theory", (2008), Indigenous Nations Journal, Vol. 6, No. 1, 2008 and Kansas Journal of Law & Public Policy, Vol. 18, No. 1, 2008
- EagleWoman, Angelique, "The Philosophy of Colonization Underlying Taxation Imposed Upon Tribal Nations within the United States", (2007), Tulsa Law Review, Vol. 43, No. 1, 2007
- EagleWoman, Angelique, "Re-Establishing the Sisseton-Wahpeton Oyate's Reservation Boundaries: Building a Legal Rationale from Current International Law", (2004-2005), American Indian Law Review, Vol. 29, p. 239, 2004-2005
- EagleWoman, Angelique, "Strate v. A-1 Contractors: Intrusion into the Sovereign Domain of Native Nations", (1998), North Dakota Law Review, Vol. 74, No. 4, 1998
- EagleWoman, Angelique, "Federal Courts - Indians: The Eleventh Amendment and Seminole Tribe: Reinvigorating the Doctrine of State Sovereign Immunity", (1997), North Dakota Law Review, Vol. 73, No. 1, 1997
