= Agency Village, South Dakota =

- Census-designated place
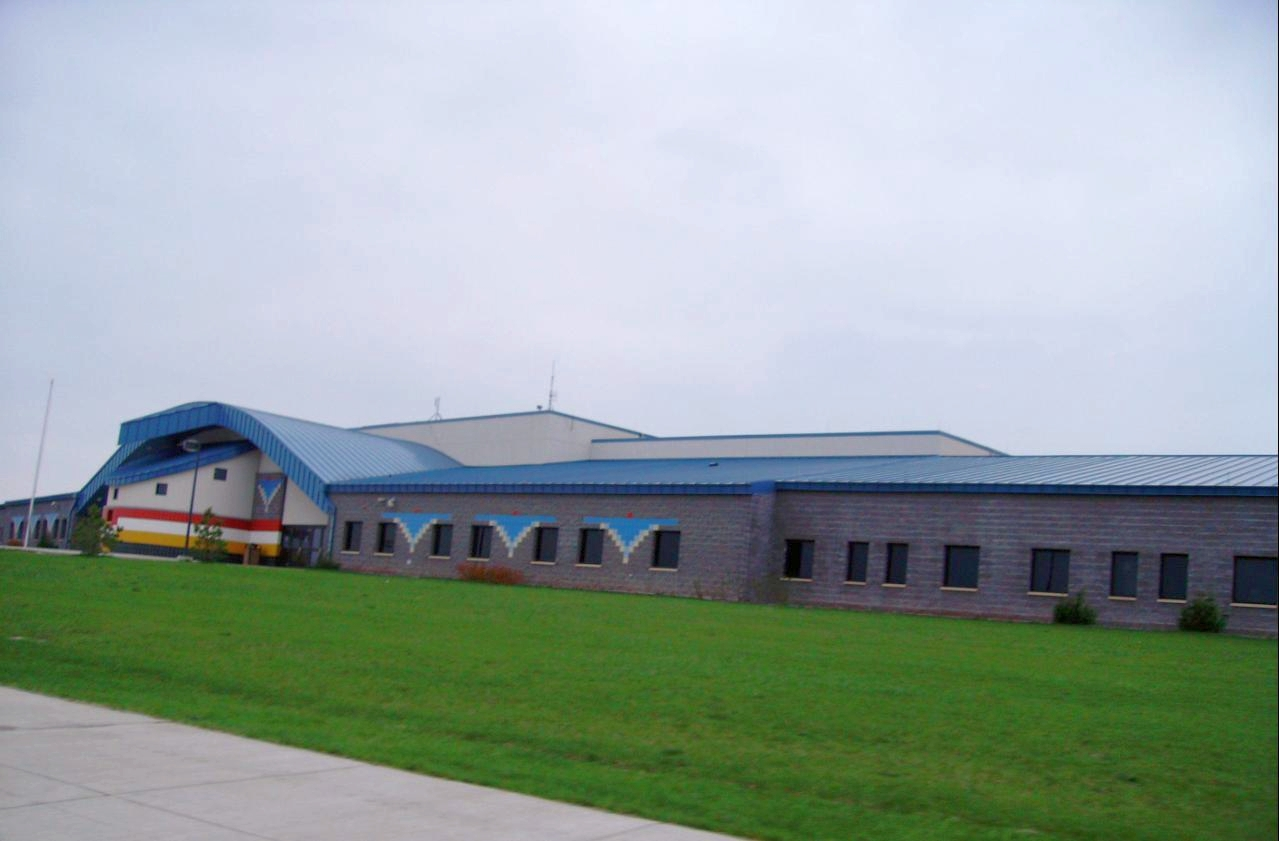
- Tiospa Zina Tribal School, located in Agency Village

- Location within South Dakota Location within the United States
- Coordinates: 45°34′47″N 97°04′42″W
- Country: United States
- State: South Dakota
- County: Roberts

Area
  - Total: 7.17 sq mi (18.57 km^{2})
  - Land: 7.15 sq mi (18.52 km^{2})
  - Water: 0.019 sq mi (0.05 km^{2})
- Elevation: 1,545 ft (471 m)

Population (2020)
  - Total: 776
  - Density: 108.5/sq mi (41.89/km^{2})
- Time zone: UTC-6 (Central (CST))
  - Summer (DST): UTC-5 (CDT)
- ZIP code: 57262
- Area code: 605
- FIPS code: 46-00520
- GNIS feature ID: 2584542

Agency Village is an unincorporated area and census-designated place (CDP) in Roberts County, South Dakota, United States. It is the headquarters of the Sisseton Wahpeton Oyate and home to Sisseton Wahpeton College. Since 2020, the CDP includes the community known as Goodwill. The population of the CDP was 776 at the 2020 census.

The village hosts a number of powwows, one of which is held annually just before Independence Day. This outdoor powwow draws a large number of tourists to the area. The community is primarily made up of members of the tribe.

== Geography ==
Agency Village is in Goodwill and Agency townships and is part of the Lake Traverse Reservation. The community has a post office assigned ZIP code 57262, which it shares with nearby Sisseton.

== Demographics ==
Historical population
Census	Pop.	Note	%±
2010	181		—
2020	776		328.7%
U.S. Decennial Census; 2010 2020; Prior to the 2020 census, Goodwill CDP was merged into Agency Village CDP

=== 2020 census ===
Agency Village CDP, South Dakota – Demographic Profile (NH = Non-Hispanic)
Race / Ethnicity	Pop 2010	Pop 2020	% 2010	% 2020
White alone (NH)	11	18	6.08%	2.32%
Black or African American alone (NH)	1	2	0.55%	0.26%
Native American or Alaska Native alone (NH)	159	707	87.85%	91.11%
Asian alone (NH)	0	0	0.00%	0.00%
Pacific Islander alone (NH)	0	0	0.00%	0.00%
Some Other Race alone (NH)	0	2	0.00%	0.26%
Mixed Race/Multi-Racial (NH)	6	38	3.31%	4.90%
Hispanic or Latino (any race)	4	9	2.21%	1.16%
Total	181	776	100.00%	100.00%

Note: the US Census treats Hispanic/Latino as an ethnic category. This table excludes Latinos from the racial categories and assigns them to a separate category. Hispanics/Latinos can be of any race.

=== 2000 population ===
Agency Village was not counted separately during the 2000 Census. The township reported 277 people, 83 households, and 70 families.

== Education ==
Schools in the community:

- Tiospa Zina Tribal School (affiliated with the Bureau of Indian Education)

The community lies in the boundary of Sisseton School District 54-2.
