= Tiospa Zina Tribal School =

Coordinates: 45.5602°N 97.0778°W

Tiospa Zina Tribal School is a tribal K-12 school in Agency Village, South Dakota. It is 6 miles (9.7 km) from Sisseton. It is affiliated with the Bureau of Indian Education (BIE).

== History ==
The school was the project of the chairperson of the area Indian tribe, a man named Rollin Ryan (he died in or before 1989).

It was established circa 1981, with an initial enrollment of 11. The area did not yet have a school prior to TZTS's opening. By 1994 the school had about 500 students. At that time there were plans to construct a replacement facility which would be designed in an eagle-like shape. By 2004 the facility had been built, with the cost being $21 million.

The school in 2003 made a Bureau of Indian Affairs-defined adequate progress level, but it did not do so in 2004.
