= Walla Lutheran Church =

Historic church in South Dakota, United States

- U.S. National Register of Historic Places
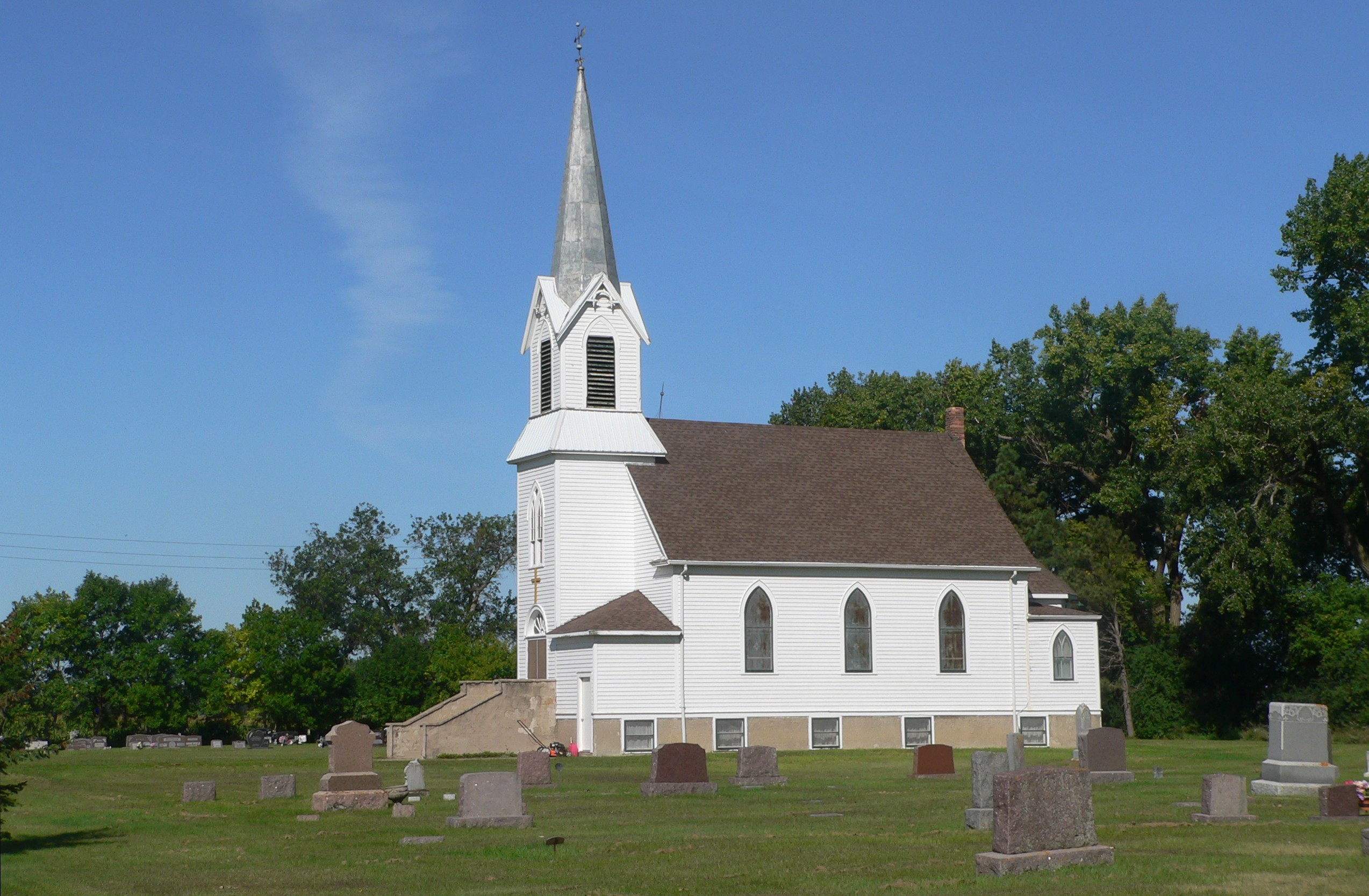
- Church and cemetery

- Location within South Dakota Location within the United States
- Nearest city: New Effington, South Dakota
- Coordinates: 45.865556°N 96.889444°W
- Built: 1902
- Architectural style: Late Gothic Revival
- NRHP reference No.: 04000470
- Added to NRHP: May 19, 2004

Walla Lutheran Church is a historic church in rural Roberts County, South Dakota, in the United States.It was added to the National Register of Historic Places in 2004.

Walla Lutheran Church was organized in 1894 by Swedish immigrant homesteaders as the Swedish Evangelical Lutheran Walla Church. Built in 1902, the sanctuary is a large wood-frame church with Late Gothic Revival features. The church was dedicated in 1903. Pastor K. G. William Dahl, who later founded Bethphage Mission in Axtell, Nebraska served the church from 1907 to 1909.
