= Long Hollow, South Dakota =

Community in South Dakota

- Unincorporated community
- Location within South Dakota Location within the United States
- Coordinates: 45°40′56″N 97°09′40″W
- Country: United States
- State: South Dakota
- County: Roberts

Area
  - Total: 14.55 sq mi (37.69 km^{2})
  - Land: 14.43 sq mi (37.38 km^{2})
  - Water: 0.12 sq mi (0.31 km^{2})
- Elevation: 1,696 ft (517 m)

Population (2020)
  - Total: 265
  - Density: 18.4/sq mi (7.09/km^{2})
- Time zone: UTC-6 (Central (CST))
  - Summer (DST): UTC-5 (CDT)
- Area code: 605
- GNIS feature ID: 2584559

Long Hollow is an unincorporated community and census-designated place on the Lake Traverse Indian Reservation in Roberts County, South Dakota, United States. Its population was 265 as of the 2020 census.

== Geography ==
According to the U.S. Census Bureau, the community has an area of 14.550 square miles (37.68 km^{2}); 14.432 square miles (37.38 km^{2}) of its area is land, and 0.118 square miles (0.31 km^{2}) is water.

== Demographics ==
Historical population
Census	Pop.	Note	%±
2020	265		—
U.S. Decennial Census
