= Lake Traverse Indian Reservation =

Coordinates: 45°36′44″N 97°08′29″W

- Indian reservation
- Location in North Dakota and South Dakota
- Tribe: Sisseton Wahpeton Oyate
- Country: United States
- States: North Dakota; South Dakota
- Counties: Richland; Sargent; Codington; Day; Grant; Marshall; Roberts
- Headquarters: Agency Village

Government
  - Body: Tribal Council
  - Chairman: J. Garret Renville
  - Vice-Chairman: Lexie Fancher-Lincoln
  - Secretary: Curtis Bissonette

Population (2024)
  - Total: 14,800
- Website: swo-nsn.gov

The Lake Traverse Indian Reservation is the homeland of the federally recognized Sisseton Wahpeton Oyate, a branch of the Santee Dakota group of Native Americans. Most of the reservation covers parts of five counties in northeastern South Dakota, while smaller parts are in two counties in southeastern North Dakota, United States. Its largest community is the city of Sisseton, South Dakota.

As of 2019, the reservation had an estimated population of 11,095.

== History ==
The reservation was created by treaty on April 22, 1867 and called the Flatiron Reservation, in reference to its triangular shape. It was created for the "friendly Dakota" from the Minnesota hostilities of 1862-1866. Signatories of the treaty were Gabriel Renville, John Otherday, and twenty-one other Sisseton and Wahpeton leaders. Gabriel Renville was the first chief of the reservation.

== Geography ==
The reservation covers 108,589 acres. Over 60% of its land area lies in Roberts County, South Dakota, but there are lesser amounts in Marshall, Day, Grant and Codington counties in South Dakota, as well as Sargent and Richland counties in North Dakota.

== Government ==
The reservation is governed by a seven-member council, one member elected from each district: Big Coulee (Iyakapta), Buffalo Lake (Can Onasa Bde), Enemy Swim (Toka Nuwan), Lake Traverse (Bde hda Kinyan), Long Hollow (Kaksize Hanska), Old Agency (Ate Yapi Tipi), and Veblen (Heipa). Councilmembers serve two-year terms.

The executive committee comprises a chairman, vice-chairman, and secretary.

The tribal headquarters are located in Agency Village, South Dakota.

== Economy ==
Major employers include the Dakota Sioux Casino, the Sisseton Wahpeton tribal government, and the Bureau of Indian Affairs.

== Education and media ==
Sisseton-Wahpeton College was established in Agency Village in 1979. The newspaper Sota Iya Ye Yapi ("smoke signals") is published weekly.

== Notable people ==
- Woodrow W. Keeble (1917–1982), U.S. Army Medal of Honor recipient
- Gabriel Renville (1824–1892), chief
- Paul War Cloud (1930–1973), artist
- Floyd Westerman (1936–2007), country singer and actor

== Communities ==
- Agency Village, South Dakota
- Claire City, South Dakota
- Goodwill, South Dakota
- Lake City, South Dakota (most, population 46)
- Long Hollow, South Dakota
- New Effington, South Dakota
- Ortley, South Dakota
- Peever, South Dakota
- Rosholt, South Dakota
- Sisseton, South Dakota
- Summit, South Dakota
- Veblen, South Dakota
- Waubay, South Dakota (part, population 15)
