= Woodrow W. Keeble =

Korean War Medal of Honor recipient (1917–1982)

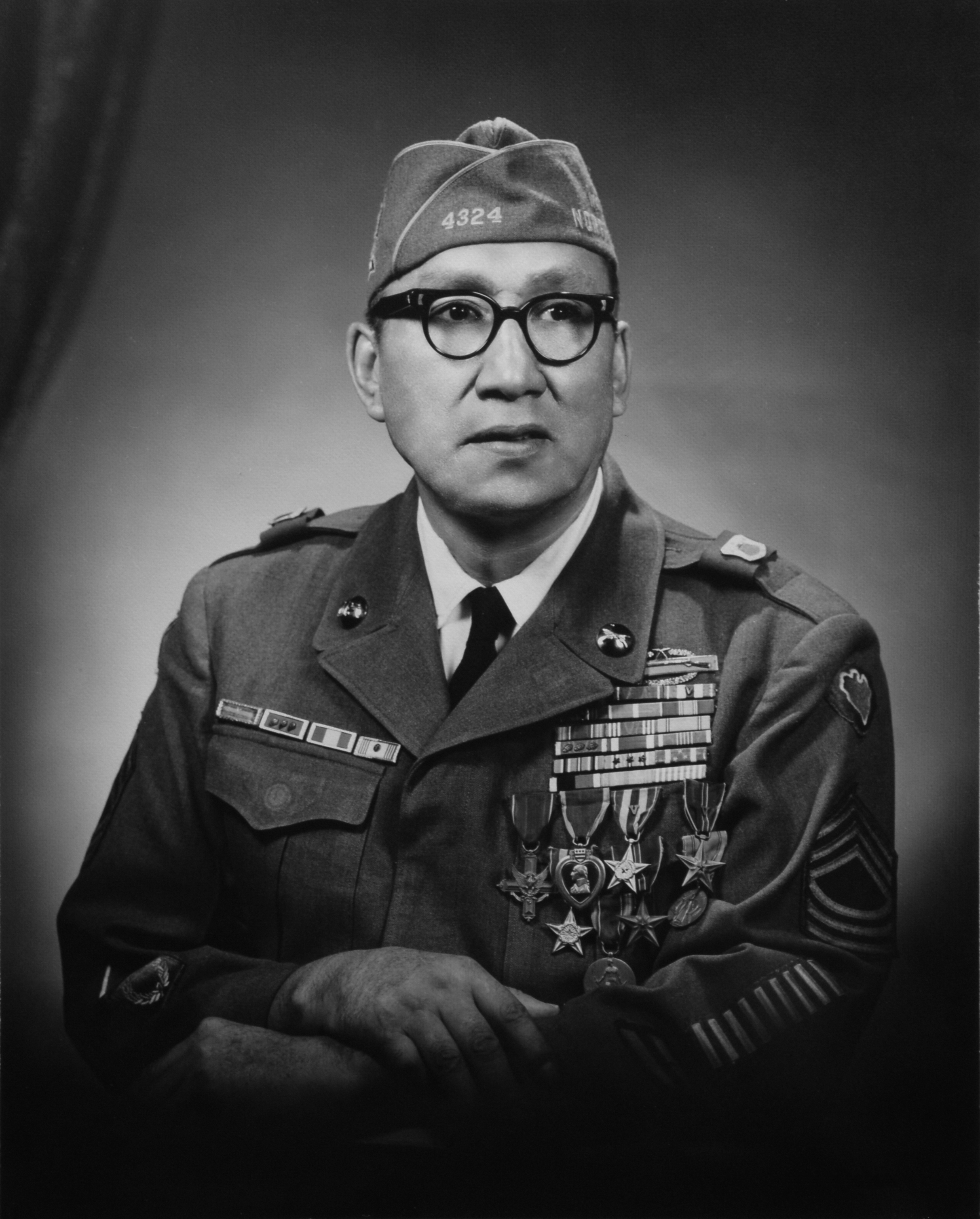
- Born: May 16, 1917; Waubay, South Dakota
- Died: January 28, 1982 (aged 64); Sisseton, South Dakota
- Burial place: Sisseton Cemetery, Sisseton, South Dakota
- Military career
- Allegiance: United States
- Branch: United States Army
- Service years: 1941–1946; 1951–1952
- Rank: Master Sergeant
- Units: Company I, 164th Infantry Regiment; 1st Platoon, George Company, 2nd Battalion, 19th Infantry Regiment
- Conflicts: World War II: Guadalcanal Campaign; Korean War
- Awards: Medal of Honor; Silver Star (2); Bronze Star Medal with "V" Device (2); Purple Heart (4)

Woodrow Wilson Keeble (May 16, 1917 – January 28, 1982) was a United States Army National Guard combat veteran of both World War II and the Korean War. In 2008, he was posthumously awarded the Medal of Honor for heroic actions during the Korean War. He was a member of the people of the Lake Traverse Reservation, a federally recognized tribe of Dakota people.

On March 3, 2008, following a long campaign by his family and the congressional delegations of both North and South Dakota, President George W. Bush posthumously awarded Keeble the Medal of Honor for his heroic actions on October 20, 1951, in the Korean War. Keeble had previously been awarded the Distinguished Service Cross for these actions in 1952. He was wounded at least twice in World War II and three times in Korea, but he had received only two Purple Hearts for these injuries; later he was credited with four Purple Hearts.

== Early life ==
Keeble was born on May 16, 1917, in Waubay, South Dakota, to Isaac and Nancy (née Shaker) Keeble, members of the Sisseton Wahpeton Oyate. While still very young, he moved with them to Wahpeton, North Dakota, where his mother worked at the Wahpeton Indian School. (Since being transferred to the tribe in the 1970s, it is called Circle of Nations School). She died when Keeble was still a child. Keeble's father, who was too impoverished to feed his family, permanently enrolled Woodrow and his siblings in the school.

Keeble excelled in sports, especially baseball. He pitched the Wahpeton amateur team to 10 straight victories. He was being recruited by the Chicago White Sox when his Army National Guard unit was called up to serve in World War II. Keeble was called to active duty with his National Guard unit on February 10, 1941.

== World War II ==
In World War II, Keeble served with I Company of the famed North Dakota 164th Infantry Regiment. After initial training in Louisiana, the regiment carried out various orders in several West Coast locations before being deployed to Australia in preparation for operations in the Pacific Theater. Keeble's unit was assigned to the United States Army's Americal Division (23rd Infantry Division).

The 164th Infantry landed on Guadalcanal on October 13, 1942, to help the battered First Marine Division, which had suffered heavy losses while clearing the South Pacific island of Japanese. The 164th regiment provided the first replacements for the 1st Marines, and although the new boys were green, the exhausted men heartily welcomed the North Dakotans—and their supplies.

Keeble's regiment of Dakotans was the first United States Army unit to conduct an offensive operation against the enemy in any theater.

Largely because of transport constraints, the Americal Division arrived on Guadalcanal piecemeal, and was fed into combat alongside the battle-hardened Marines. In contrast to the way several U.S. Army divisions were deployed in the Pacific War, the soldiers of the 164th Infantry were able to learn the practical art of jungle warfare against the Japanese without suffering as many casualties as might otherwise have occurred.

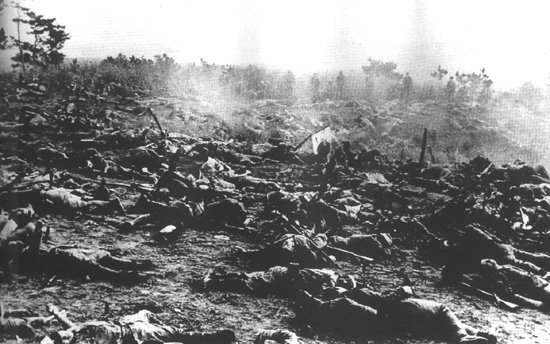
Dead soldiers from the Japanese 2nd Division litter the Guadalcanal battlefield after the failed assaults on October 25, 1942, against positions held by the 7th Marine Regiment and the 164th Infantry Regiment of the North Dakota National Guard.

The battles on Guadalcanal were some of the most brutal of the war. Japanese troops adopted the Banzai charge, wildly attacking in human waves. Sometimes the hand-to-hand battles would last all through the night.

During these battles, Keeble's reputation for bravery and skill grew. Nearly a head taller than most of his fellow soldiers, he was an expert with the Browning Automatic Rifle (BAR). His other great weapon was his pitching arm, which he used to hurl hand grenades with deadly accuracy. James Fenelon (Standing Rock Sioux Tribe of North & South Dakota), who fought with Keeble on Guadalcanal, once remarked, "The safest place to be was right next to Woody".

Despite its ad hoc formation, the Americal Division fought well at Guadalcanal, the 164th Infantry taking on a key role in the defeat of a major Japanese offensive in October 1942. The Dakotans performed so heroically on Guadalcanal in support of the Marines that they received a Navy Presidential Unit Citation.

After the battles on Guadalcanal, Keeble and the rest of the regiment participated in combat campaigns on the islands of Bougainville, Leyte, Cebu, and Mindanao. Following the Japanese surrender, the entire Americal Division landed in Japan and took part in the occupation of the Yokohama region.

Keeble was discharged from the Army on April 11, 1946, after more than five years of active duty. He had spent most of that period overseas.

After the war, Keeble returned to Wahpeton and worked at the Wahpeton Indian School. On November 14, 1947, he married Nettie Abigail Owen-Robertson (born March 30, 1917).

== Keeble on combat ==
Discussing the experience of being in combat for the first time, Keeble said,

Before I experienced the horror of that attack, I was quick to call coward or yellow anyone who showed fear under any circumstances. Nevermore. I don't know these things, but they speak truth to one. I am not a psychologist, nor a statistician, and less of a philosopher; but the depth of emotion, the dreads of fear, the referees of horrors, and the concentration of self that led me to make this observation, the fear impulse, or perhaps, better said, the (impulses caused) by fear, are stronger, more demanding than either that of love or hunger...

He also wrote:

Fear in my opinion is a state of drunkenness. And when men are in that state when the fear impulse takes a hold... he loses all reason, sense of values, and is not liable, or at least should not be held accountable for acts perpetrated when thus possessed.

Keeble continued:

During the 13 months [in the] almost continual and sustained combat in which I have ever participated, there were moments, and rare ones, I am sure; but they lose none of their terror or horror for which fear laid a relentless and a powerful hold on me, that the pull of cowardice was almost more than I could ward off. There were terrible moments that encompassed a lifetime, an endlessness, when terror was so strong in me, that I could feel idiocy replace reason. [Yet,] I have never left my position, nor have I shirked hazardous duty. Fear did not make a coward out of me.

== Korean War ==
The 164th Infantry Regiment was reactivated on January 16, 1951, during the Korean War; they trained at Camp Rucker, Alabama. When Keeble's commanding officer, Lieutenant E. Duane Holly, had to select several sergeants for deployment to the front lines, he decided to have his men draw straws. Keeble volunteered instead. Asked why, Keeble said, "Somebody has to teach these kids how to fight."

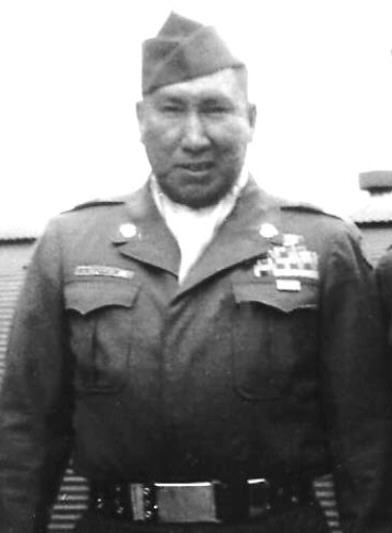
Woodrow Keeble during the Korean War

Keeble was assigned to George Company, 2nd Battalion, 19th Infantry Regiment, 24th Infantry Division. His combat experience and a genuine gift of leadership brought him a quick series of promotions to the level of master sergeant, leading the 1st Platoon.

The summer and fall of 1951 were particularly deadly for both sides as the war moved into its second year. The 24th Division was in the central area of the Korean peninsula when, on October 13, 1951, the Division was called upon to take a series of steep mountains protecting a major Chinese supply depot in the town of Kumsong. This push, called Operation Nomad-Polar, was to be the last major United Nations offensive of the war.

Keeble, described as a gentle giant by his friends, was a ferocious warrior in battle, as evidenced by his heroic actions over the next six days. Official records confirm Keeble was initially wounded on October 15—and then again on October 17, 18 and 20—for which he received only one Purple Heart. For his bravery on October 18, he was awarded a Silver Star. His heroism on October 20 made Keeble a legend, and 57 years later resulted in his posthumous Medal of Honor.

George Company was in its sixth day of round-the-clock fighting. They were facing deeply entrenched Chinese soldiers on Hill 675–770, the last major Chinese stronghold between the UN forces and Kumsong. Keeble had thus far suffered two rifle gunshot wounds to his left arm, grenade shrapnel to his face that almost removed his nose, and a badly twisted knee; on the 19th, doctors reportedly removed 83 pieces of festering shrapnel Keeble had sustained from a concussion grenade the previous day. On the 20th, Medic Dale Selby told Keeble he should stay back because of his wounds, but Keeble refused to let his men go up the mountain without him.

Keeble led all three platoons in successive assaults upon the Chinese who held the hill throughout the day. All three charges were repulsed, and the company suffered heavy casualties. Trenches were filled with enemy soldiers, and fortified by three pillboxes containing machine guns; additional Chinese surrounded the hill.

Following the third assault and subsequent mortar and artillery support, the enemy sustained casualties among its ranks in the open trenches. The machine gunners in the pillboxes, however, continued to direct fire on George Company. After Keeble withdrew the 3rd platoon, he decided to attempt a solo assault.

"He once told a relative that the fourth attempt he was either going to take them out or die trying," Hawkins said.

Armed with grenades and his Browning Automatic Rifle, Keeble crawled to an area 50 yards from the ridgeline, flanked the left pillbox, and used grenades and rifle fire to eliminate it. After returning to the point where 1st Platoon held the company's first line of defense, Keeble worked his way to the opposite side of the ridgeline, where he took out the right pillbox with grenades. "Then without hesitation, he lobbed a grenade into the back entrance of the middle pillbox and with additional rifle fire eliminated it."

Hawkins, Keeble's stepson, said one eyewitness told him the enemy directed its entire arsenal at Keeble during his assault: "He said there were so many grenades coming down on Woody, that it looked like a flock of blackbirds." Even under heavy enemy fire, Keeble completed his objective. Only after he killed the machine gunners did Keeble order his men to advance and secure the hill.

That day, Keeble single-handedly destroyed three enemy machine-gun bunkers and killed an additional seven enemy soldiers in nearby trenches. His bravery in the face of enemy fire was so remarkable that a recommendation that he receive the Medal of Honor was twice submitted. In both cases, the recommendation was lost. When Keeble's men endeavored to submit the recommendation a third time, officials informed them they were too late; they were told regulations prevented them from submitting another recommendation.

He was awarded the Distinguished Service Cross on December 20, 1952. The DSC was upgraded posthumously in 2008 to the Medal of Honor.

Keeble was removed from front line duty to recover from his wounds and was discharged on August 26, 1952.

== Later life ==
Keeble returned to North Dakota after the Korean War. He resumed working at the Wahpeton Indian School. Soon after, he was diagnosed with tuberculosis, which required that he undergo long-term treatment in Minneapolis, Minnesota. Surgeons ultimately removed one of his lungs. He suffered a series of strokes that rendered him speechless, partially paralyzed, and unable to work for the remainder of his life. Nettie, his wife of 14 years, died the following year, leaving Keeble to raise their young son, Earl, alone.

Keeble fell on hard times and is said to have pawned his service medals. But despite his disabilities, Keeble persevered. In 1967, he married Blossom Iris Crawford-Hawkins (born July 18, 1926), the first Sioux woman to complete a Doctorate of Education.

Keeble was a member of the Veterans of Foreign Wars (VFW) Post 4324 – Wahpeton, North Dakota.

Keeble died January 28, 1982, and is buried in Sisseton, South Dakota. On May 17, 2008, his tombstone was replaced with a Medal of Honor headstone.

== Medal of Honor campaign ==
Keeble's family and friends remained dedicated to efforts to get him the Medal of Honor for which he was twice recommended. United States Senators Byron Dorgan (D-ND), Kent Conrad (D-ND) John Thune (R-SD) and Tim Johnson (D-SD) long urged that Keeble be posthumously awarded the Medal of Honor.

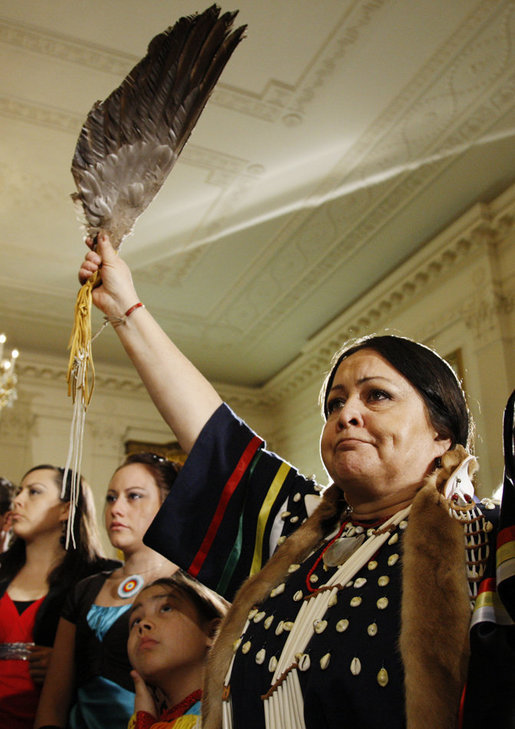
Family members of U.S. Army Master Sgt. Woodrow Wilson Keeble attending his Medal of Honor ceremony

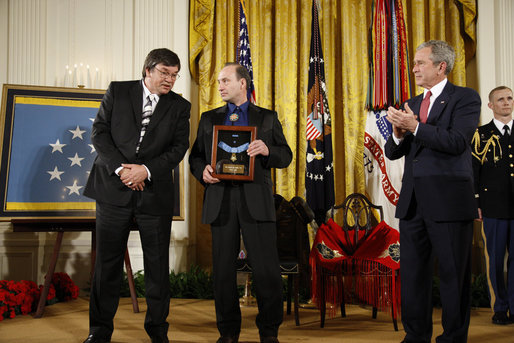
Keeble's stepson Russell Hawkins (center) accepts the Medal of Honor from President Bush on March 3, 2008

Senator Conrad and North Dakota Adjutant General Michael Haugen presented Keeble's family with a duplicate set of his military medals on May 30, 2006, at the Wahpeton Armory. Moments before the event was to begin, word came that Secretary of the Army Francis Harvey was recommending that Keeble's Distinguished Service Cross be upgraded to the Medal of Honor. From there, Keeble's case moved up to the level of Secretary of Defense.

In 2007, Secretary of Defense Donald Rumsfeld notified the four Dakota senators that a statute of limitations would prevent the Medal of Honor from being granted. The four Dakota senators immediately drafted legislation to remove the last barrier to the posthumous awarding of the medal.

In May 2007, the congressional funding bill for Iraq included language to grant a waiver of the statute of limitations to award a Medal of Honor to Woodrow W. Keeble. The President could sign off on the recommendation, conditioned on the Secretary of Defense's recommendation for the upgrade of Keeble's DSC. President Bush signed the legislation on May 24, 2007.

Senator Thune issued a statement on June 2, 2007, that read, in part,

Master Sergeant Woodrow W. Keeble served with bravery and dignity, going beyond the call of duty not for notoriety or recognition-but for the mission he believed in and the country he loved. Keeble's legacy is a great source of pride for his family, his fellow Dakota Sioux, and all Americans. The Secretary of the Army's recommendation is wonderful and long-awaited news. I began working with Master Sergeant Keeble's family and tribal officials on resolving this long overdue issue in the spring of 2002, and I will continue to work with Defense officials to ensure that this legendary soldier receives the final and most distinguished honor he deserves.

Senator Johnson urged Secretary of Defense Robert M. Gates to act quickly on the recommendation. "...it is my hope that both you and the President can move forward on Master Sergeant Keeble's case as expeditiously as possible," Johnson said in a letter to Gates quoted in the Argus Leader of Sioux Falls, South Dakota.

A year later, the President finally awarded Keeble the Medal of Honor. Despite failing health, Blossom Keeble was determined to live long enough to accept the Medal of Honor on her husband's behalf, but she died quite suddenly on June 3, 2007.

In February 2008, the White House announced that Keeble would be awarded the Medal of Honor posthumously in a ceremony scheduled for March 3, with his family to receive it. "We are just proud to be a part of this for Woody," Keeble's stepson Russell Hawkins said in a U.S. Army announcement. "He is deserving of this, for what he did in the Armed Services in defense of this country."

Hawkins added that this victory is as important for the Sisseton-Wahpeton tribe and North and South Dakota as it is for Keeble and his family. "We are all extremely proud that Woody is finally receiving this honor. He epitomized our cultural values of humility, compassion, bravery, strength and honor."

Hawkins added that Keeble was the embodiment of woyuonihan ("honor"), always carrying himself in a way so that those who knew him would be proud of him. "He lived a life full of honor and respect."

Hawkins said his feelings about Keeble echo those of all who knew him. "If he was alive today, I would tell him there's no one I respect more, and how he is everything a man should be: brave, kind and generous. I would tell him how proud I am of him, and how I never realized that all this time, I was living with such greatness."

== Awards and decorations ==
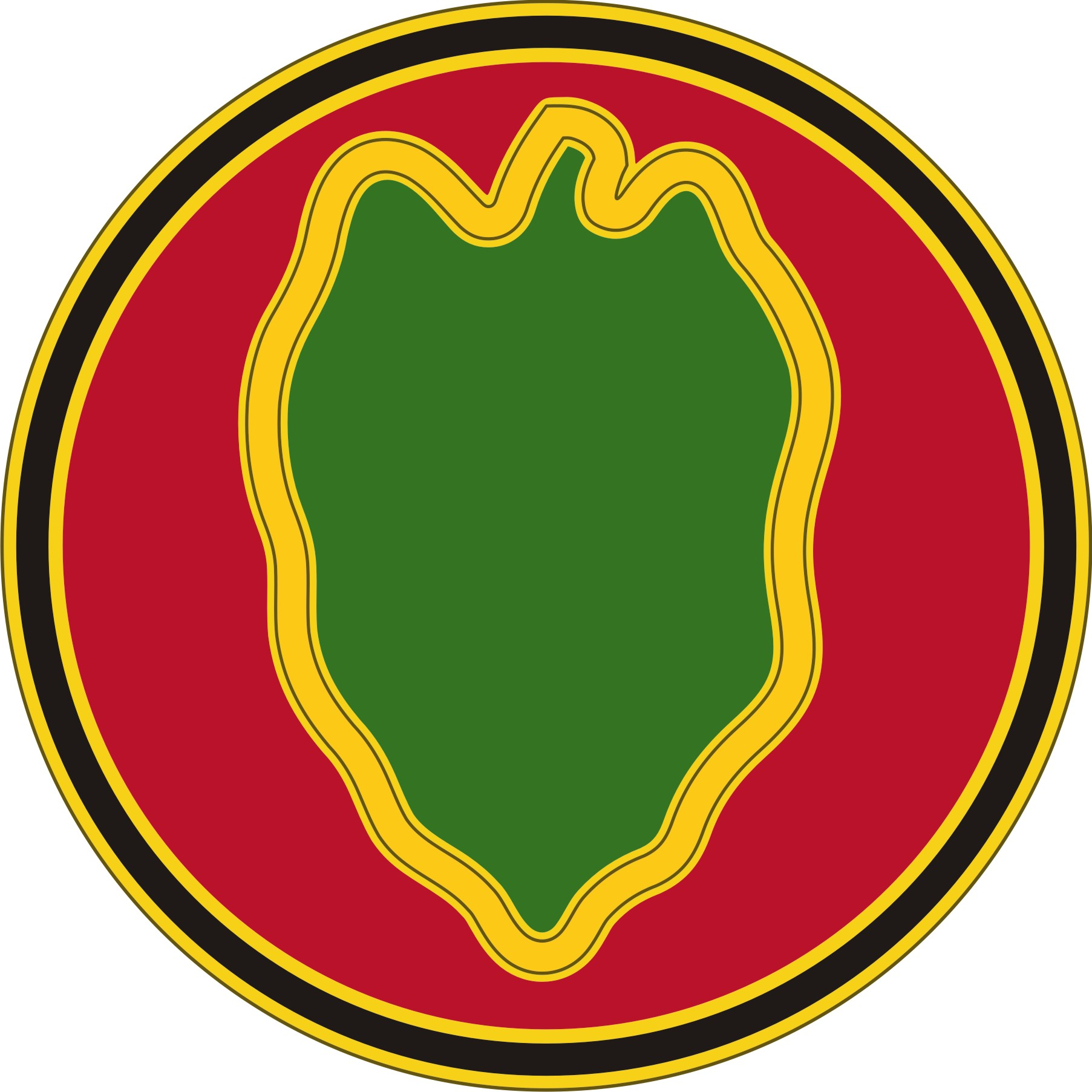
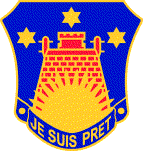
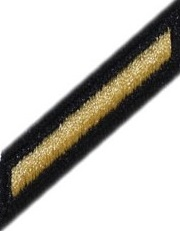
Combat Infantryman Badge with Star (denoting 2nd award)
Army Sharpshooter Badge with one weapon bar
24th Infantry Division Combat Service Identification Badge
164th Infantry Regiment Distinctive Unit Insignia
2 Service stripes
9 Overseas Service Bars

Medal of Honor
Silver Star with one bronze oak leaf cluster
Bronze Star Medal with Valor device and oak leaf cluster
Purple Heart with three oak leaf clusters
Army Commendation Medal
Navy Commendation Medal with Valor device
Army Presidential Unit Citation with three oak leaf clusters
Navy Presidential Unit Citation
Army Meritorious Unit Commendation
Army Good Conduct Medal, second award
American Defense Service Medal
American Campaign Medal
Asiatic-Pacific Campaign Medal with four bronze service stars
World War II Victory Medal
Army of Occupation Medal
National Defense Service Medal
Korean Service Medal with two service stars
Armed Forces Reserve Medal
Philippine Liberation Medal with two service stars
Philippine Republic Presidential Unit Citation
Republic of Korea Presidential Unit Citation
United Nations Korea Medal
Korean War Service Medal

=== Medal of Honor citation ===
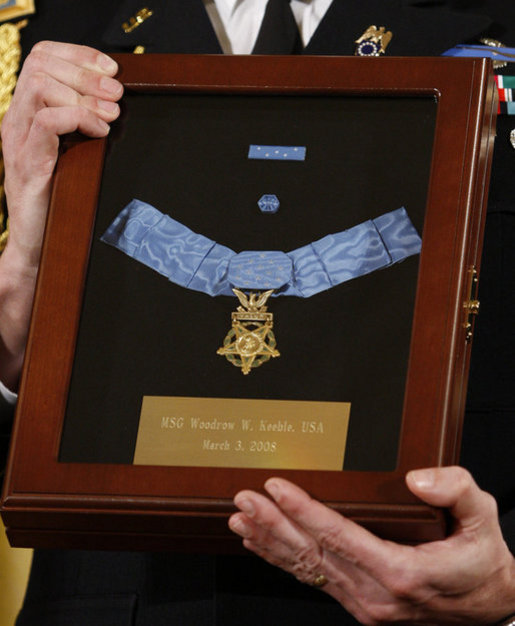
Keeble's Medal of Honor

The President of the United States of America, authorized by Act of Congress, March 3, 2008, has awarded in the name of Congress the Medal of Honor to:

Master Sergeant Woodrow W. Keeble United States Army

Citation:

For conspicuous gallantry and intrepidity at the risk of his life above and beyond the call of duty: Master Sergeant Woodrow W. Keeble distinguished himself by acts of gallantry and intrepidity above and beyond the call of duty in action with an armed enemy near Sangsan-ni, Korea, on October 20, 1951. On that day, Master Sergeant Keeble was an acting platoon leader for the support platoon in Company G, 19th Infantry, in the attack on Hill 765, a steep and rugged position that was well defended by the enemy. Leading the support platoon, Master Sergeant Keeble saw that the attacking elements had become pinned down on the slope by heavy enemy fire from three well-fortified and strategically placed enemy positions. With complete disregard for his personal safety, Master Sergeant Keeble dashed forward and joined the pinned-down platoon. Then, hugging the ground, Master Sergeant Keeble crawled forward alone until he was in close proximity to one of the hostile machine-gun emplacements. Ignoring the heavy fire that the crew trained on him, Master Sergeant Keeble activated a grenade and threw it with great accuracy, successfully destroying the position. Continuing his one-man assault, he moved to the second enemy position and destroyed it with another grenade. Despite the fact that the enemy troops were now directing their firepower against him and unleashing a shower of grenades in a frantic attempt to stop his advance, he moved forward against the third hostile emplacement, and skillfully neutralized the remaining enemy position. As his comrades moved forward to join him, Master Sergeant Keeble continued to direct accurate fire against nearby trenches, inflicting heavy casualties on the enemy. Inspired by his courage, Company G successfully moved forward and seized its important objective. The extraordinary courage, selfless service, and devotion to duty displayed that day by Master Sergeant Keeble was an inspiration to all around him and reflected great credit upon himself, his unit, and the United States Army.

== Additional honors ==
On March 17, 2008, the South Dakota Governor Mike Rounds, before a joint session of the State Congress, officially proclaimed the date to be forever commemorated as Woodrow Wilson Keeble Day in the state of South Dakota.

On July 23, 2008, North Dakota Governor John Hoeven posthumously presented Keeble with the Theodore Roosevelt Rough Rider Award. The award recognizes present or former North Dakotans who achieve national recognition in their fields of endeavor.

In addition to these awards, many regional sites also pay homage to the memory of Woodrow Keeble. A section of U.S. Highway 12 near Keeble's birthplace in Waubay, South Dakota, is named in his honor. A special shelter in Chahinkapa Park in Wahpeton was built in his honor. Previous to the Medal of Honor ceremony, the gymnasium at the Wahpeton Indian School, now called the Circle of Nations School, was named for him. In May 2008, the school celebrated its 100th anniversary and named a new dormitory for Keeble. The State of North Dakota erected a Medal of Honor Memorial in Roosevelt Park in Minot. North Dakota has more Medal of Honor recipients, per capita, than any other state. A separate pillar was built for Keeble and dedicated during a special celebration on July 4, 2008. A new Armed Forces Reserve Center in Sioux Falls has also been named for Keeble.
