= New Effington Hospital =

- U.S. National Register of Historic Places
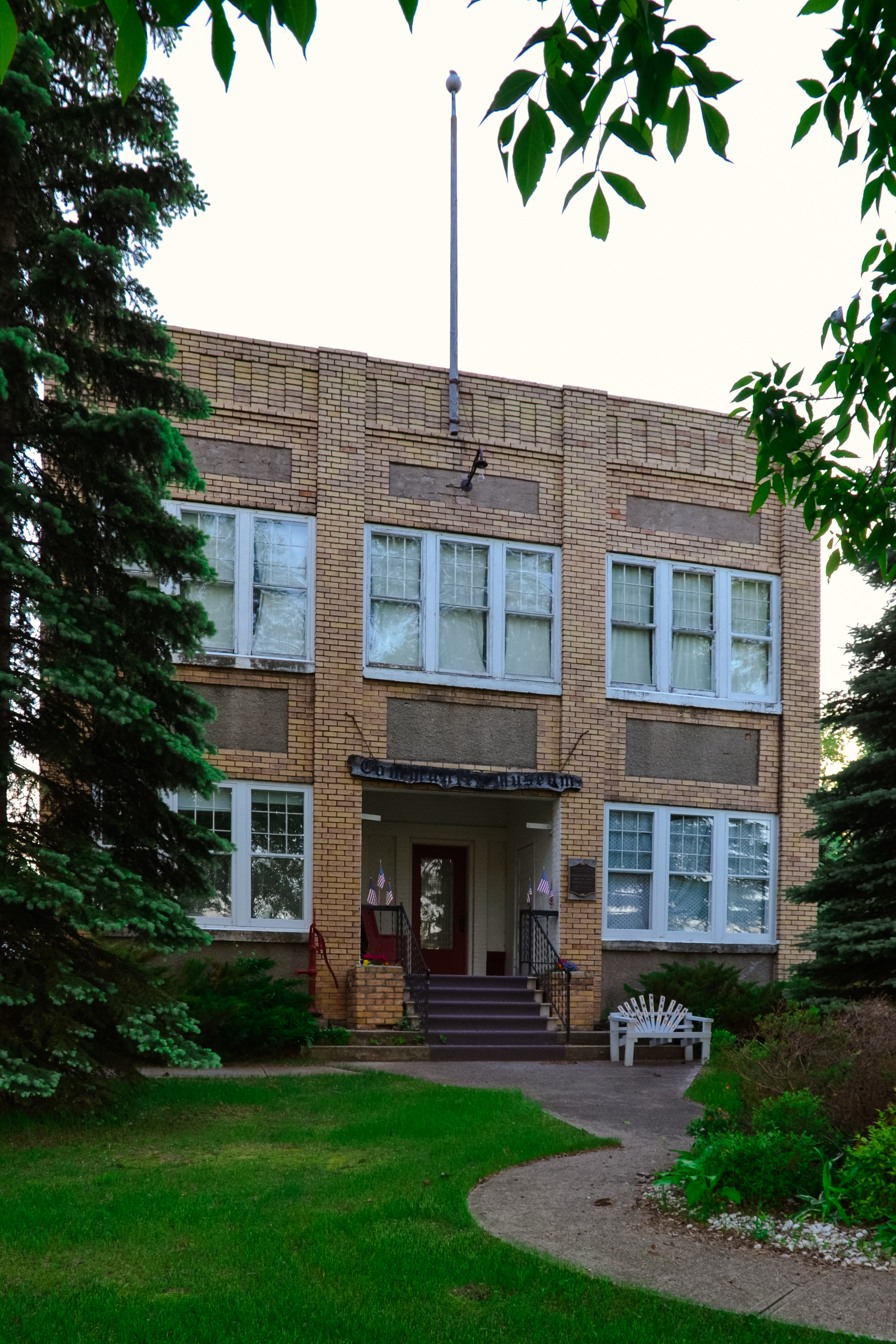

- Location within South Dakota Location within the United States
- Location: Oddin Ave. New Effington, South Dakota
- Coordinates: 45°51′14″N 96°55′05″W
- Area: less than one acre
- Built: 1915
- Built by: Beito Lumber Co.
- Architectural style: Late 19th and Early 20th Century American Movements
- NRHP reference No.: 89000829
- Added to NRHP: July 13, 1989

The New Effington Hospital, on Oddin Ave. in New Effington, South Dakota, was listed on the National Register of Historic Places in 1989. It had been repurposed by then to become the Effington Community Museum.

Built from 1913 to 1915, it is a two-story brick building on a concrete foundation. Its design reflecting elements of Commercial and Prairie School styles.
