= Cynthia MacAdams =

American actress and photographer (born 1939)

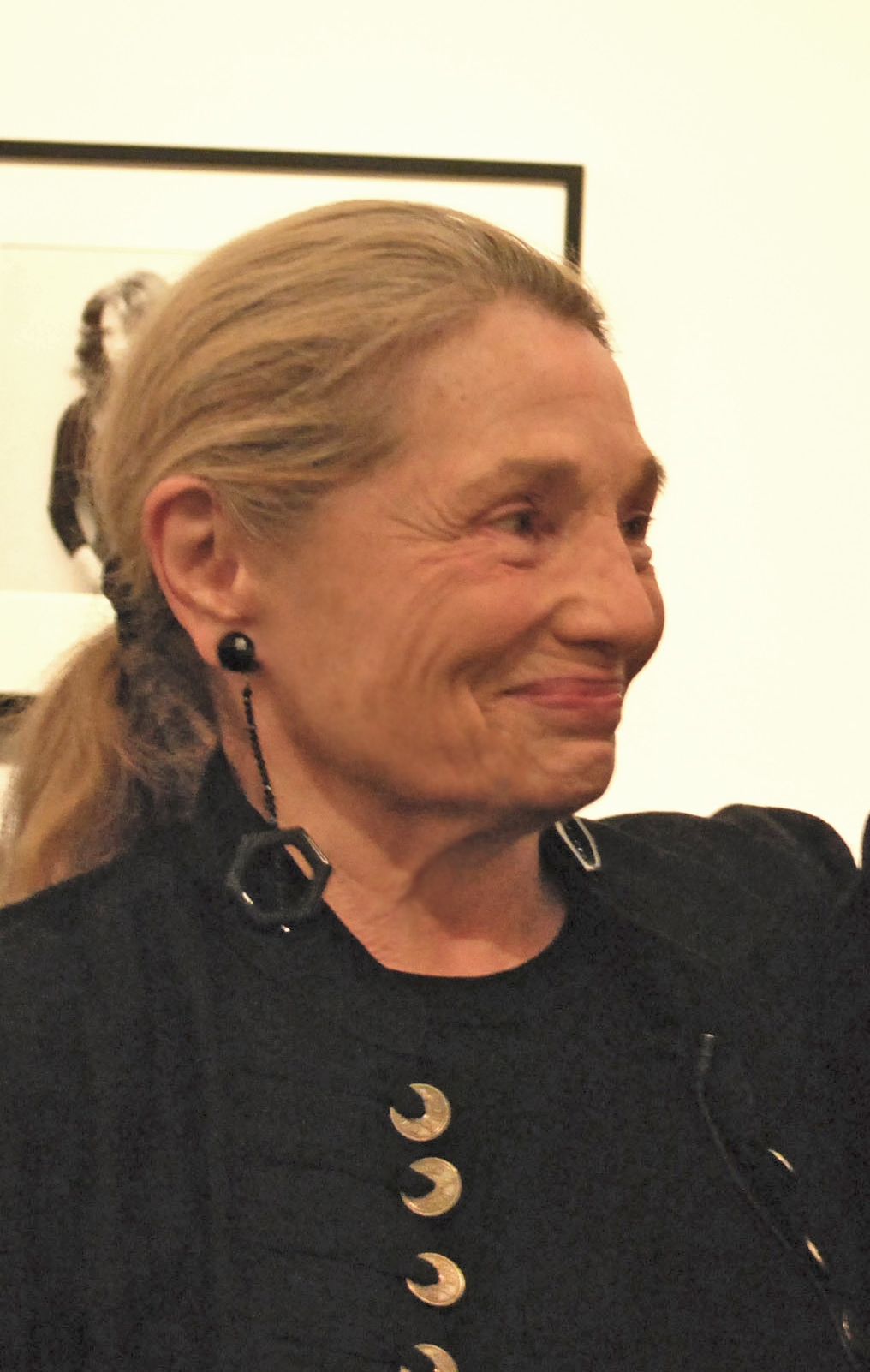
- Cynthia MacAdams at Kasher Gallery Emergence exhibit
- Born: Cynthia Rose Adams; September 5, 1939 (age 87); Webster, South Dakota, US
- Education: Actors Studio Northwestern University
- Known for: Photography, Acting

Cynthia MacAdams (born Cynthia Rose Adams, September 5, 1939) is an American actress and photographer. She is recognized for her black and white portraiture, use of natural light and infrared photography, and images of sacred architecture.

MacAdams moved to New York City in 1961 for a career in theater. When offered a film role in Wild in the Streets in 1968 she moved to Hollywood. Her photographic work extends to the sacred in architecture and human artifact including the temples of Angkor Wat, Tibet and the Mayan pyramids.

Since 1978, MacAdams has documented the history and life on the Bowery NYC through her portraits ranging from structures, to street people to resident artists and poets such as William Burroughs, Patti Smith, Anne Waldman, Kate Millett, Chuck Close, Robert Mapplethorpe.

== Early life ==
Cynthia MacAdams was born in Webster, South Dakota. She was the third and youngest child of Grace Woodworth and Albert Adams. The family moved to Sisseton, South Dakota in the early 1920s where they owned and ran the local weekly newspaper, the Sisseton Courier. Cynthia's mother continued the newspaper after the death of her husband in 1944. Cynthia's summers were spent at the family cabin on the Native American land of Pickerel Lake. MacAdams attended South Dakota State from 1957 to 1959, where she developed a love for theater and acting. She transferred to Northwestern University in Chicago in 1959, and graduated in 1961 with a B.A. in speech and communication.

== Career ==
=== Acting ===
After graduating from Northwestern, MacAdams worked in summer stock and then, in 1961 moved to New York and landed a part in the Broadway production of Nightlife by Sidney Kingsley. She studied acting with Lee Strasberg and Sandy Meisner. It was during this period that MacAdams met two of her lifelong friends and mentors: the actress Shelley Winters and the photographer/filmmaker Robert Frank. In 1965, Robert Frank offered her a role in his film Me and My Brother. In 1966 she became a member of the Actors Studio and worked in several productions. She went on to work in several films, including The Last Movie, and The Mad Bomber before turning to photography. MacAdams has remained an active member of the Actors Studio in New York and Los Angeles.

=== Photography ===
MacAdams turned to photography in 1974. She met Beat Generation poets at Naropa Institute in Colorado, and began her portrait work. MacAdams published three books of photography. Emergence began as a collection of portraits of women friends and became a feminist statement of the 1970s. Steven Kasher of New York Kasher Gallery said:“This work is pertinent because we want to see what these amazing women looked like when they were in their prime, shaking things up. The spirit of that struggle is in the pictures. Cynthia captures them boldly, without trying to be complex or intellectual.” In her artist’s statement for the book, MacAdams said: “I looked for women….. who had strength and softness in their eyes and a directness in the way they dealt with their life.” Some of the "second-wave" feminists who are presented in the book include: Judy Chicago, Michelle Phillips, Gloria Steinem, Lily Tomlin, Jane Fonda, Phyllis Chesler, Laurie Anderson and Meredith Monk.

In 1978 MacAdams began her study of the female nude using black and white and infrared film. In 1983 Rising Goddess was published. As Kate Millett says in her preface: "Books of the female nude by women photographers are rare enough. And therefore, the integrity and self- sufficient character of these women, their strength. For the strength is unmistakable; it is what strikes one first. They are utterly unafraid, unashamed.”

MacAdams had a studio loft overlooking the Bowery from 1978 to 2011. She photographed life on the streets of the Bowery; including the architecture with the people. Portrayed were punk rockers at CBGB, artists and poets such as William Burroughs, Allen Ginsberg, Robert Mapplethorpe, and Anne Waldman. She documented the lives of the men and women living on the streets, in their cars, and in homeless shelters. Her work documents the gentrification of the area over time.

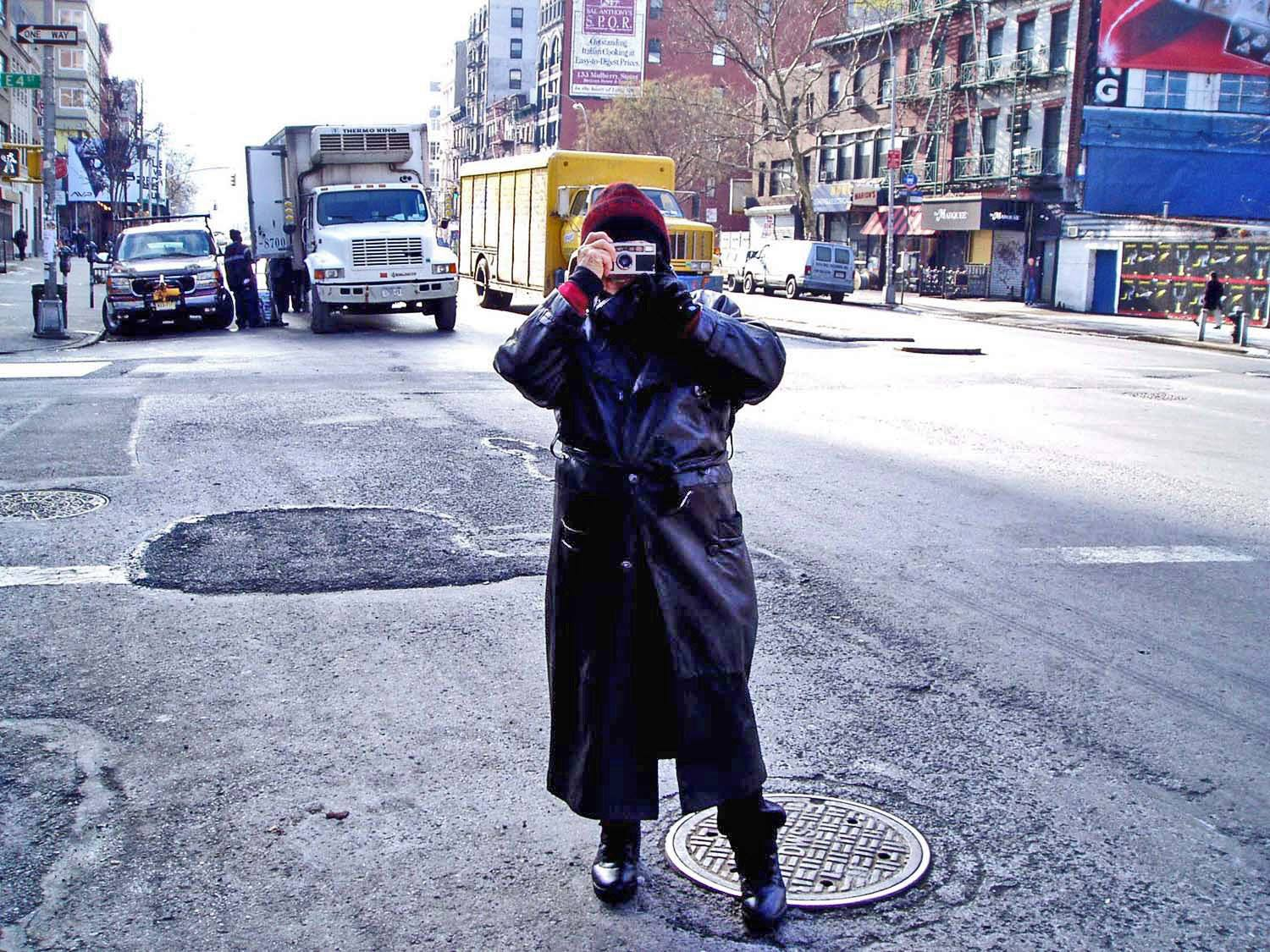
Cynthia MacAdams shooting in winter on the Bowery

MacAdams also explored forms of sacred architecture in portfolios of Egypt, Tibet, Angkor Wat, Indian Temples, Celtic and Mayan ruins. As with the nudes, MacAdams shot in black and white and infrared film. Mayan Vision Quest was published in 1991.

In 2018 Netflix released an original documentary film called "Feminists: What Were They Thinking?" using MacAdams photographic book Emergence, which featured portraits of women who were instrumental in the struggle for Women's Rights beginning in the 1970s, as the cornerstone of the narrative.

=== Photography books ===
- Mayan Vision Quest, Harper Collins 1991 ISBN 9780062505651
- Nude Photography, Amphoto 1985 ISBN 9780817450984
- Rising Goddess, Morgan & Morgan 1983 ISBN 9780871001863
- Emergence, Chelsea House 1977 ISBN 9780877540571
