= Jula Hughes =

Jula Hughes was the Dean of the Bora Laskin Faculty of Law at Lakehead University. She was previously a professor at the University of New Brunswick Faculty of Law.
