= Lowell Lundstrom =

American evangelist and musician

Lowell Odell Lundstrom (November 28, 1939 – July 20, 2012) was an American evangelist and musician.

== Biography ==
Lundstrom was born in Minneapolis, Minnesota, United States. At the age of 14 he started a rock and roll band where the same year he met Connie Brown, who would become his wife.

He began his work as a minister on April 7, 1957, at Sisseton, South Dakota and married Brown two months later. In 1996, he and other members of his family founded Celebration Church in Lakeville, Minnesota, and pastored there until his homegoing.

Throughout 50 years he had millions of followers and produced 600 gospel songs and 60 albums, for which he was commemorated in the Minnesota Music Hall of Fame in 2005.

He died from Parkinson's disease on July 20, 2012, at his home in Savage, Minnesota at the age of 72.
