= Bora Laskin Faculty of Law =

Law school in Thunder Bay, Ontario

Coordinates: 48°26′16″N 89°13′41″W

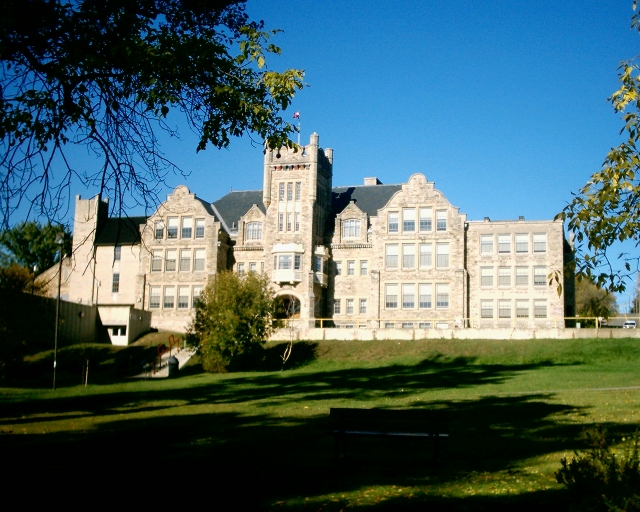
- The historic Port Arthur Collegiate Institute, pictured here in 2006, serves as the home of the Bora Laskin Faculty of Law
- Parent school: Lakehead University
- Established: 2013; 13 years ago
- School type: Public law school
- Parent endowment: $31,14 million CAD
- Dean: Betsy Birmingham
- Location: Thunder Bay, Ontario, Canada
- Enrollment: 195
- Faculty: 30
- Website: www.lakeheadu.ca/programs/departments/law

The Bora Laskin Faculty of Law is the professional school of law of Lakehead University in Thunder Bay, Ontario, Canada.

== History ==
Lakehead University's Bora Laskin Faculty of Law officially opened in September 2013. Its founding dean was Lee Stuesser. It was the first Canadian law program to integrate licensing into its curriculum, meaning its graduates are qualified to practice law without requiring an articling process. The school and Peter Allard School at the University of British Columbia were in 2015 the only two law schools in Canada that has a mandatory, full year course in Aboriginal Law, as recommended by Canada's Truth and Reconciliation Commission (TRC) at the time Its founding was endorsed by the Nishnawbe Aski Nation of Northern Ontario.

In 2015, Lee Stuesser completed his tenure as Founding Dean and was replaced by interim Dean Lisa Phillips of Osgoode Hall, while a permanent replacement Dean was sought.

On January 12, 2016, the Bora Laskin Faculty of Law announced Angelique EagleWoman, an Indigenous law scholar, as the new Dean of Law. Her tenure, which began in May 2016, made her the first Indigenous law dean in Canada. In April 2018, EagleWoman decided to resign her position by June 2018, citing systemic racism in the law school. The claim was settled in 2020 "to the mutual satisfaction of the parties.

On June 1, 2018, EagleWoman was succeeded on an interim basis by Patrick Smith, a supernumerary judge of the Ontario Superior Court of Justice based in Thunder Bay who took leave from the bench. Smith, a seventeen-year veteran on the bench, had served for three years on the Specific Claims Tribunal adjudicating Indigenous damage claims against the government and had authored two volumes meant to guide judges on Indigenous law. In September 2018, Smith left as interim dean, two months before what had been planned. The same month, a conduct review was launched by the Canadian Judicial Council against Smith, to examine whether he violated council guidelines by becoming involved in a situation likely to result in litigation and therefore reduce public confidence in the justice system. After a finding that Smith had engaged in misconduct, the council referred the matter to a council to determine a sanction. Prior to a sanction being issued, Smith successfully challenged the decision before the Federal Court, arguing that the council had acted unreasonably. The Canadian Judicial Council chose not to appeal the decision. Smith was replaced as interim dean by David Barnett, the university's acting provost and academic vice-president.

In 2019, Dr. Jula Hughes was appointed Dean of the Faculty. She was previously a professor at the University of New Brunswick Faculty of Law.

== Building ==
The Bora Laskin Faculty of Law is housed in Thunder Bay's historic Port Arthur Collegiate Institute, built in 1909.

== Admissions ==
The Bora Laskin Faculty of Law is one of only a few Canadian law schools, in addition to Windsor Law and Thompson Rivers Law School, that chooses not to publish the average or median LSAT score or GPA (Grade Point Average) for the entering class.

On November 21, 2013, the Convocation of the Law Society of Upper Canada (LSUC) announced that Lakehead University was successful in its application to proceed with an Integrated Practice Curriculum (IPC) model of legal education. Students enrolled in the three year JD program at Lakehead will complete integrated practice training and do placements within their three-year degree. Upon completion of their JD degree Lakehead graduates will not need to article or complete any other course of study. The Faculty was the first law school to gain approval for such a program, which inspired a similar program at Toronto Metropolitan University.
