= Goodwill, South Dakota =

- Unincorporated community
- Interactive map of Goodwill, South Dakota
- Coordinates: 45°33′58″N 97°03′21″W
- Country: United States
- State: South Dakota
- County: Roberts
- Elevation: 1,444 ft (440 m)

Population (2010)
  - Total: 513
- Time zone: UTC-6 (Central (CST))
  - Summer (DST): UTC-5 (CDT)
- FIPS code: 46-24775
- GNIS feature ID: 2584555

Goodwill is an unincorporated community and former census-designated place (CDP) in Roberts County, South Dakota, United States. Prior to the 2020 Census, the CDP was merged into the Agency Village census-designated place. Over 90% of the population is Native American.

== Demographics ==
Historical population
Census	Pop.	Note	%±
2010	513		—
U.S. Decennial Census merged into the Agency Village CDP prior to the 2020 Census

=== 2010 census ===
Goodwill CDP, South Dakota - Demographic Profile (NH = Non-Hispanic)
Race / Ethnicity	Pop 2010	% 2010
White alone (NH)	13	2.53%
Black or African American alone (NH)	0	0.00%
Native American or Alaska Native alone (NH)	470	91.62%
Asian alone (NH)	0	0.00%
Pacific Islander alone (NH)	0	0.00%
Some Other Race alone (NH)	0	0.00%
Mixed Race/Multi-Racial (NH)	22	4.29%
Hispanic or Latino (any race)	8	1.56%
Total	513	100.00%

Note: the US Census treats Hispanic/Latino as an ethnic category. This table excludes Latinos from the racial categories and assigns them to a separate category. Hispanics/Latinos can be of any race.
