= Sisseton Wahpeton College =

Tribal land-grant college in South Dakota, US

- Type: Public tribal land-grant college
- Established: 1979; 47 years ago
- Parent institution: Sisseton Wahpeton Oyate
- President: Erica Holmes
- Students: 250 (80% Dakota people)
- Location: Sisseton, South Dakota, U.S. 45°33′46″N 97°03′39″W
- Campus: Rural reservation
- Nickname: Mustangs
- Website: www.swcollege.edu

Sisseton Wahpeton College (SWC) is a public tribal land-grant college of the Sisseton Wahpeton Oyate on the Lake Traverse Reservation in South Dakota. It was established in 1979 and serves the Dakota people and the general public. SWC has an average enrollment of about 250 students, of whom more than 80% are tribal members. It has both vocational and academic programs, which includes certificates, associate degrees, and bachelor's degrees as well as articulation arrangements with other universities and colleges so that students can transfer for continued studies.

== History ==
SWC was originally a vocational and technical school; an academic program was added as enrollment climbed. SWC is one of the few post-secondary schools in South Dakota to offer both vocational and academic degrees.

== Academics ==
Undergraduate demographics as of Fall 2023
Race and ethnicity	Total
American Indian/Alaska Native	93%
Black	3%
White	3%
Economic diversity
Low-income (Note: The percentage of students who received an income-based federal Pell grant intended for low-income students.)	62%
Affluent (Note: The percentage of students who are a part of the American middle class at the bare minimum.)	38%

Although SWC is accredited by the Higher Learning Commission to offer associate and bachelor's degrees. It also has agreements with several 4-year degree-granting institutions that allow SWC students to take much of their coursework at SWC or seamlessly matriculate to another institution. The agreement between SWC and Mount Marty College offers SWC students the opportunity to earn a Baccalaureate degree in Business and Tribal Governance.

== Partnerships ==
SWC is a member of the American Indian Higher Education Consortium (AIHEC), a community of tribally and federally chartered institutions working to strengthen tribal nations. SWC was created in response to the higher education needs of American Indians. It generally serves geographically isolated populations that have no other means to access education beyond the high school level.

== Institute for Dakota Studies ==
SWC was one of the first tribal colleges to establish an institute for the study and preservation of tribal culture. The college created the Institute for Dakota Studies in 1992. This center's mission is to teach, study and preserve the tribe's unique history and traditions.

== Center for Excellence in Dakota Language ==
The Center for Excellence in Dakota Language, established at SWC in 2005, works with the college's strong Dakota studies and Dakota Language programs to revitalize the Dakota language. Eventually, this program hopes to establish a revitalization model that can be replicated anywhere in Indian Country.

== Campus ==
The college has recently expanded its facilities and programs; one of the final products of this was Song to the Great Spirit, the new SWC Vocational Education Building. Designed as a facility where students could learn building trades by constructing a single-family home inside, the building's unique design makes the SWC campus a local landmark.

The building is an example of culturally contextual architectural design: it is in the shape of four Indian figures who, with drumsticks raised, are singing a traditional Dakota song using their drum. The building honors SWC's history and that of the Dakota people. The figures are made of fiberglass and are almost fully functional. Two house stairwells, one the elevator, and the other the utility and storage closets.

SWC has also almost doubled its square footage, with added classrooms and offices and an Early Childhood Education Center. Also part of the campus is an auditorium, which also houses the transmitter for KXSW, a local radio station.

== See also ==
- American Indian College Fund (AICF)
