= Sisseton Wahpeton Oyate =

Native American tribal organization in South Dakota and North Dakota

Sisseton-Wahpeton Oyate of the Lake Traverse Reservation
Skiskiṭuŋwaŋ Waȟpéthuŋwaŋ Oyáte
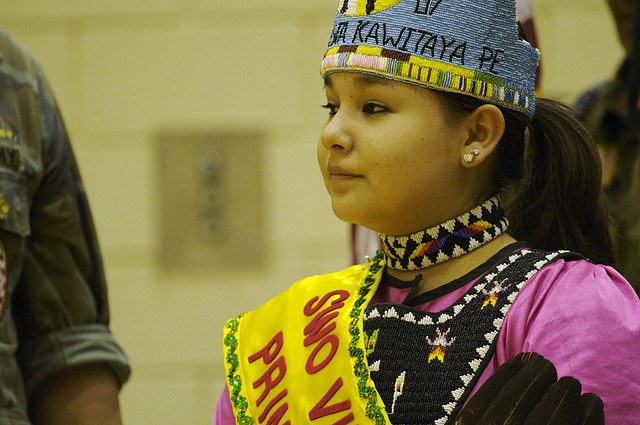
- 2006–2007 Sisseton Wahpeton Oyate Vietnam Veterans princess at the University of Minnesota, Morris powwow, photo by Nic McPhee

Total population
- 12,300

Regions with significant populations
- United States (South Dakota)

Languages
- English, Dakota

Religion
- traditional tribal religion, Christianity, Sun Dance, Native American Church

Related ethnic groups
- other Dakota, Lakota, Nakota

The Sisseton Wahpeton Oyate of the Lake Traverse Reservation (Dakota: Skiskiṭuŋwaŋ Waȟpéthuŋwaŋ Oyáte), formerly Sisseton-Wahpeton Sioux Tribe/Dakota Nation, is a federally recognized tribe comprising two bands and two subdivisions of the Isanti or Santee Dakota people. They are on the Lake Traverse Reservation in northeast South Dakota.

== Lake Traverse Reservation ==
The Lake Traverse Reservation and its boundaries were established by the Lake Traverse Treaty of 1867. From 1884 until the 1913, the tribal government was based upon the concept of the Soldier's Lodge. Due to external pressures from federal Indian agents and religious missionaries, as well as internal turmoil, in 1913 the tribe created an advisory committee. It served as the basis of government until 1946.

In 1934 the federal government urged the tribe to adopt the provisions of the Wheeler-Howard Act, also known as the Indian Reorganization Act. By 1946 the tribe had reorganized, establishing the current system of bylaws and elected tribal government at Agency Village. It gained self-government again as the federally recognized Sisseton Wahpeton Sioux Tribe. The authority was based in the Lake Traverse Treaty of 1867.

From 1946 to 2002, the federally recognized tribe was known as the Sisseton Wahpeton Sioux Tribe. For a brief period in 1994, they identified as the Sisseton-Wahpeton Dakota Nation. During their 2002 tribal general elections, they approved a measure changing the name to Sisseton Wahpeton Oyate, the latter word in the Dakota language meaning "people or nation".

== Enrollment and districts ==
The current enrollment of the tribe is approximately 12,000 members spread among seven districts located across the reservation. There were 9,894 living on the reservation circa 2004. The tribe's districts are:

1. Agency Village, or Atéyapi Ṭípi
2. Lake Traverse, or Bde Hdakíƞyaƞ
3. Buffalo Lake, or C̣aƞówanasápi
4. Veblen, or Ḣéip̣a
5. Big Coulee, or Iyákaptapi
6. Long Hollow, or Kaksíza Háƞska
7. Enemy Swim, or Ṭóka Nuwáƞ

== Treaty of 1851 Traverse de Sioux ==
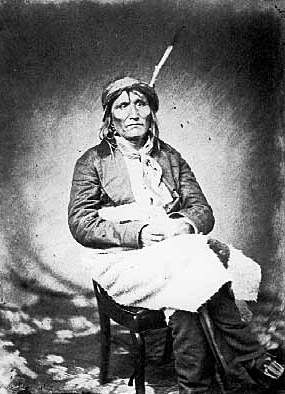
Chief Mazasa (Red Iron), c. 1860.

On July 23, 1851 the Treaty of Traverse des Sioux was formed between the United States government, and the (Dakota) Sioux of the Minnesota Territory. The territorial governor, Alexander Ramsey, and Commissioner of Indian Affairs, Luke Lea, instigated the treaty to gain concessions of the rich agricultural lands in Minnesota for European-American settlers. The Sioux ceded large tracts of land, from Iowa north to the Canada–US border. Some bands, such as the Sisseton and Wahpeton, were hesitant to give up so much, yet reluctantly did so; the federal government had shown during the 1832 Black Hawk War a willingness to fight when the Indian parties were hesitant to negotiate.

Included in the treaty stipulations was a monetary amount of $1,665,000 in cash and annuities, with reservations to be established at the Upper Agency near Granite Falls, Minnesota and another at the Lower Agency near Redwood Falls, Minnesota, stretching from 20 miles in width to about 70 miles in length. The Upper Sioux had territory that contained some of their old villages and was more familiar in term of hunting and fishing. The Lower Agency location required the displacement of many Sioux from their traditional woodland areas and did not satisfy them. At the last minute, the government attached a "traders-paper" rider, which allocated $400,000 of the annuities to traders who had claims against the Indians and biracial Indians who would not otherwise share in the benefits, but suffered discrimination in much European-American society.

By 1858 Dakota leaders went to Washington D.C. to sign two more treaties, ceding the reservation north of the Minnesota River (whose boundaries had never been approved by the US Congress). The influx of white settlers, the desire for more land by the federal government, along with its failure to pay the total of the promised annuities, the pressure to conform to Christianized ways, loss of hunting and fishing land, and the overall discontent of the Dakota bands would be the catalysts leading to the plains Indian Wars, which spanned the next 30 years.

== Dakota War of 1862 ==
In August 1862 the unrest among eastern Santee bands came to a climax with open combat against settlers in what would be called Dakota War of 1862, the Dakota Conflict or Sioux Uprising. On August 4, 1862 the Sisseton and Wahpeton bands were able to obtain food and supplies from the Indian agency, but on August 17 the Mdewakanton and Wahpekute bands were denied. The US Indian Agent and Minnesota State Senator Thomas J. Galbraith refused to distribute supplies without having received payment from the Sioux. At a summit to resolve the matter, Dakota leaders asked trader Andrew Myrick to back their cause. His answer to them was reportedly insulting.

His statement outraged the Dakota people. The day before, August 16, annuity monies arrived at St. Paul, Minnesota for distribution and were sent to Fort Ridgely on the 17th, but by then it was too late. Historians note actions by four Dakota aki-ci-ta (warriors) at a settlement at Acton, Meeker County, as the beginning of the conflict. A young aki-ci-ta reportedly stole eggs from a settler, leading to a confrontation in which five white men were killed. Soon violent conflicts erupted elsewhere around the region.

Initially the Dakota had victories at the Battle of Redwood Ferry, their assault on New Ulm, and the Battle of Birch Coulee, as well as minor losses at the Battle of Fort Ridgely, where the European-Americans incurred high losses but won a victory.

Sisseton-Wahpeton bands did not participate in the killing of settler families that defined the early conflicts. A majority of the 4,000 members of the two northern tribes opposed the fighting. A large number of Sisseton and Wahpeton had adopted both subsistence farming and Christianity, and had both moral objections and strong reasons of self-interest for keeping peace with the whites.

Dakota aki-ci-ta laid siege to Fort Abercrombie for six weeks and disrupted supply lines and shipping from the north and Canada, as well as couriers heading to St. Cloud and Fort Snelling. Large-scale combat ended on September 26, 1862 when six companies of Minnesota militia and an artillery unit attacked Dakota positions at the Battle of Wood Lake. Three days later, Dakota forces surrendered at Camp Release, where 269 POWs were released to the troops there led by Col. Henry Sibley. Small-scale skirmishes continued in the following weeks. Historians estimate total casualties at 800 to more than 1,000 civilians and military, but the exact numbers have never been determined.

In the wake of the war, the Dakota were severely punished: a US military court convicted 303 men of war crimes and sentenced them to death. Of the 303, the Army hanged 38 men the day after Christmas in Mankato, Minnesota, in the largest mass execution in United States history. Efforts were undertaken to revoke the treaties, abolish the reservation, and expel remaining Dakota people from Minnesota entirely. Bounties of $25 were put on any Dakota found within the boundaries, with the exception of 208 families of Mdewakanton, who were considered "friendly". Soon after, additional conflicts in what were known as the Indian Wars broke out to the south and west, ending finally with the Wounded Knee Massacre in 1890 and the defeat of the Sioux.

In 1866, the War Department, which then supervised the Indian agents and reservations, appointed Gabriel Renville 1824–1892, chief scout for General Sibley, as head chief of the Sisseton-Wahpeton bands. In 1867 he was appointed Chief for life by members of the Sissetowan band.

== Education ==
In 1904 the federal government authorized an inter-tribal boarding school, the Wahpeton Indian School, to be located off-reservation in Wahpeton, North Dakota. Opened in 1908, it was run by the Bureau of Indian Affairs and was the last government-established boarding school to open, as well as one of the last to operate.

In 1993, nearly two decades since tribes had been taking back control of their children's education, this school was chartered under the Sisseton Wahpeton Oyate, whose Lake Traverse Reservation extends into North Dakota.

Since the 1970s, many tribes have educated their children on their reservations, but this school serves continuing needs among students for boarding placement. Renamed the Circle of Nations Wahpeton School, it is funded by the Bureau of Indian Education (BIE), after receiving tribally controlled grant status under Public Law 100-97 (Indian Education Act of 1988). It serves students in grades 4-8.

In 1979 the tribe established a tribal college, Sisseton Wahpeton College, on its Lake Traverse Reservation. The land-grant community college now serves about 250 students, of whom more than 80% are Dakota. Initiated as a technical and vocational institution, the college now also offers associate degrees in academic studies. Through arrangements with four-year colleges, students can transfer to complete bachelor's degrees. The college established Dakota Studies in 1992 and a Dakota language program in 2005.

== Notable members of the tribe ==
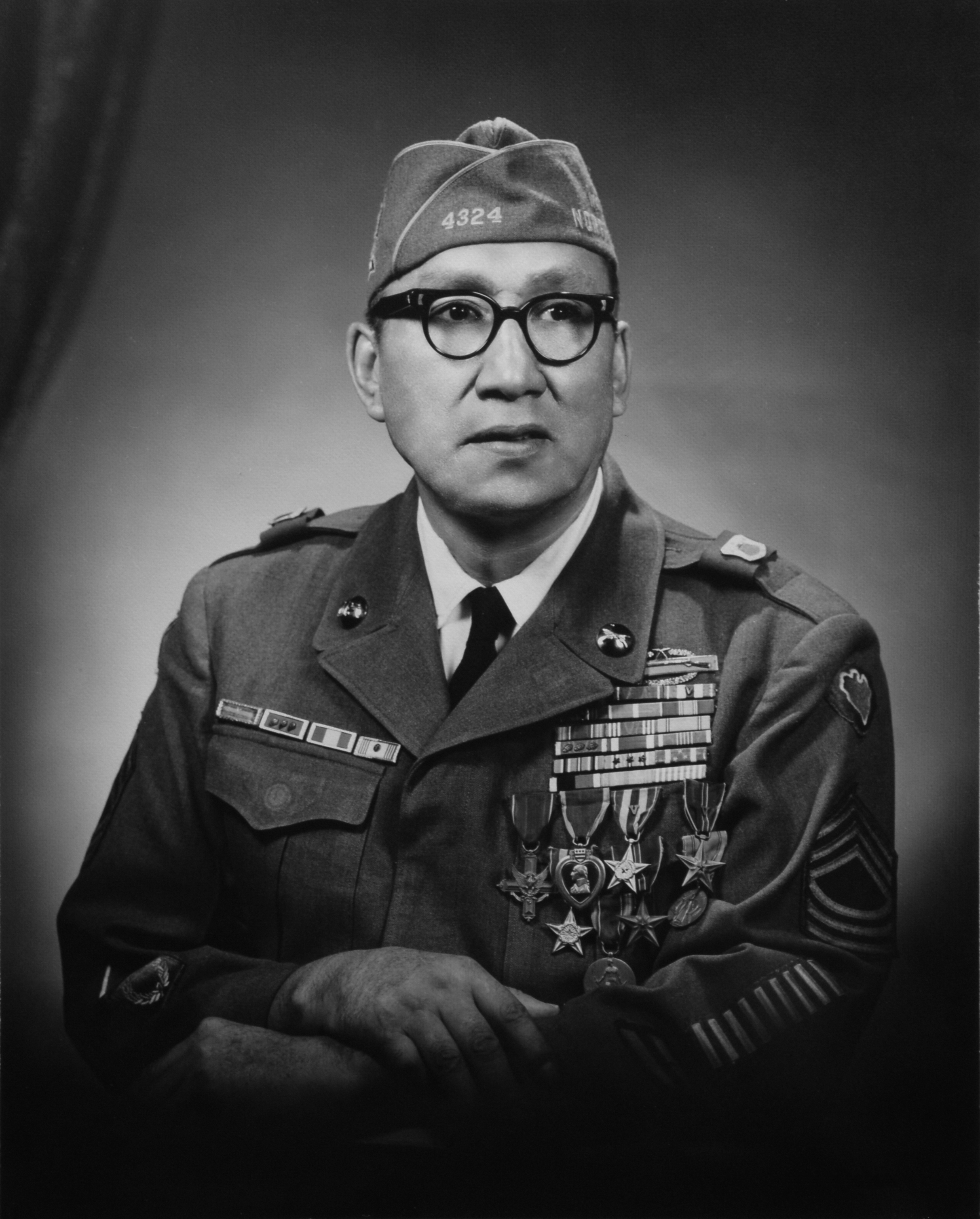
Woodrow Keeble (1917–1982), Medal of Honor recipient

- Bryan Akipa, Native American flute-player
- Joe Donnell, politician
- Angelique EagleWoman, first Indigenous Dean of a Canadian law school, author, and law professor
- Woodrow W. Keeble (1917–1982), veteran and Medal of Honor recipient
- Isabella Star LaBlanc, actress
- Gabriel Renville was a nephew of Red Iron, chief of the Sisseton and Wahpeton, and the last chief of the bands.
- Creighton Leland Robertson (1944–2014), Episcopalian bishop and lawyer
- Tamara St. John, tribal archivist, Republican member of the South Dakota House of Representatives
- Kim TallBear, Professor at the University of Alberta, specializing in racial politics in science
- Paul War Cloud (1930–1973), author and artist
- Floyd Red Crow Westerman (1936–2007), Sisseton Dakota singer and actor from the Lake Traverse Reservation

== Notes ==
1. The source of the Dakota language names and orthography is the article titled Dakota people
