= Ortley, South Dakota =

Ortley, South Dakota Wiyaka Otuŋwe (Dakota)
- Town
- Location in Roberts County and the state of South Dakota
- Coordinates: 45°20′06″N 97°12′18″W
- Country: United States
- State: South Dakota
- County: Roberts
- Incorporated: 1906

Area
  - Total: 2.24 sq mi (5.81 km^{2})
  - Land: 2.24 sq mi (5.81 km^{2})
  - Water: 0 sq mi (0.00 km^{2})
- Elevation: 1,844 ft (562 m)

Population (2020)
  - Total: 50
  - Density: 22/sq mi (8.6/km^{2})
- Time zone: UTC-6 (Central (CST))
  - Summer (DST): UTC-5 (CDT)
- ZIP code: 57256
- Area code: 605
- FIPS code: 46-47660
- GNIS feature ID: 1267526

Ortley (Dakota: Wiyaka Otuŋwe) is a town in Roberts County, South Dakota, United States. The population was 50 according to the 2020 census.

== History ==
Ortley was laid out in 1906; an early variant name was Anderson.

== Geography ==
According to the United States Census Bureau, the town has a total area of 2.24 square miles (5.80 km^{2}), all land.

== Demographics ==
Historical population
Census	Pop.	Note	%±
1910	192		—
1920	187		−2.6%
1930	157		−16.0%
1940	184		17.2%
1950	144		−21.7%
1960	127		−11.8%
1970	111		−12.6%
1980	80		−27.9%
1990	63		−21.2%
2000	54		−14.3%
2010	65		20.4%
2020	50		−23.1%
U.S. Decennial Census

=== 2010 census ===
As of the census of 2010, there were 65 people, 28 households, and 20 families residing in the town. The population density was 29.0 inhabitants per square mile (11.2/km^{2}). There were 42 housing units at an average density of 18.7 per square mile (7.2/km^{2}). The racial makeup of the town was 84.6% White, 12.3% Native American, and 3.1% from two or more races.

There were 28 households, of which 21.4% had children under the age of 18 living with them, 53.6% were married couples living together, 17.9% had a female householder with no husband present, and 28.6% were non-families. 25.0% of all households were made up of individuals, and 10.7% had someone living alone who was 65 years of age or older. The average household size was 2.32 and the average family size was 2.60.

The median age in the town was 48.6 years. 16.9% of residents were under the age of 18; 4.6% were between the ages of 18 and 24; 20.1% were from 25 to 44; 26.2% were from 45 to 64; and 32.3% were 65 years of age or older. The gender makeup of the town was 55.4% male and 44.6% female.

=== 2000 census ===
As of the census of 2000, there were 54 people, 25 households, and 16 families residing in the town. The population density was 24.1 people per square mile (9.3/km^{2}). There were 32 housing units at an average density of 14.3 per square mile (5.5/km^{2}). The racial makeup of the town was 85.19% White and 14.81% Native American.

There were 25 households, out of which 28.0% had children under the age of 18 living with them, 56.0% were married couples living together, 4.0% had a female householder with no husband present, and 36.0% were non-families. 36.0% of all households were made up of individuals, and 16.0% had someone living alone who was 65 years of age or older. The average household size was 2.16 and the average family size was 2.81.

In the town, the population was spread out, with 20.4% under the age of 18, 11.1% from 18 to 24, 18.5% from 25 to 44, 27.8% from 45 to 64, and 22.2% who were 65 years of age or older. The median age was 45 years. For every 100 females, there were 100.0 males. For every 100 females age 18 and over, there were 95.5 males.

The median income for a household in the town was $23,438, and the median income for a family was $24,063. Males had a median income of $21,875 versus $21,250 for females. The per capita income for the town was $11,327. There were 10.5% of families and 12.9% of the population living below the poverty line, including 8.3% of under eighteens and 20.0% of those over 64.
