= Sisseton, South Dakota =

Sisseton Sisíthuŋwaŋ (Dakota)
- City
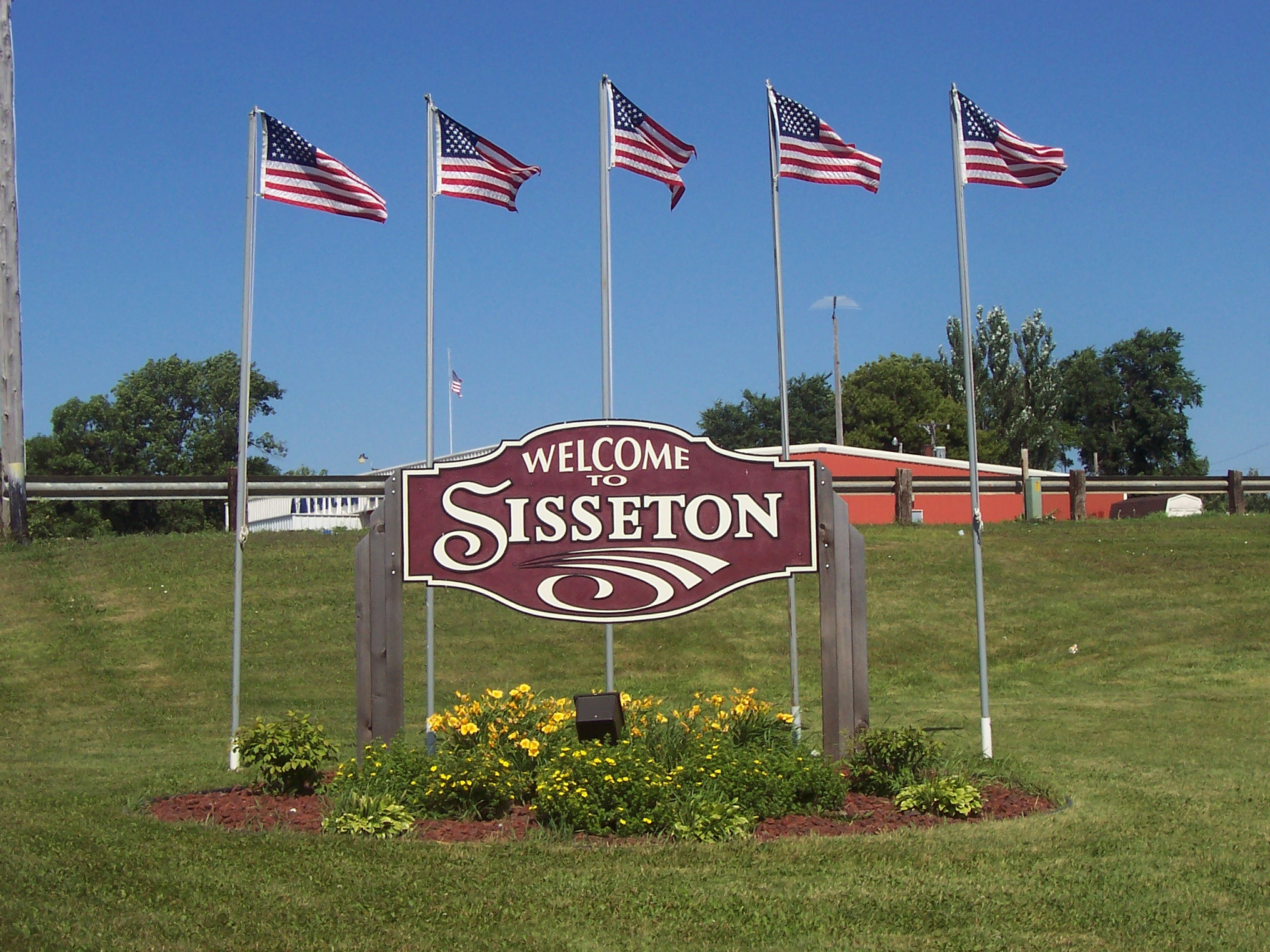
- Welcome to Sisseton

- Location in Roberts County and the state of South Dakota
- Coordinates: 45°39′45″N 97°02′43″W
- Country: United States
- State: South Dakota
- County: Roberts
- Founded: August 1, 1864
- Incorporated: August 17, 1907

Government
  - Mayor: Terry Jaspers

Area
  - Total: 1.59 sq mi (4.12 km^{2})
  - Land: 1.59 sq mi (4.12 km^{2})
  - Water: 0 sq mi (0.00 km^{2})
- Elevation: 1,234 ft (376 m)

Population (2020)
  - Total: 2,479
  - Estimate (2022): 2,412
  - Density: 1,557.9/sq mi (601.52/km^{2})
- Time zone: UTC–6 (Central (CST))
  - Summer (DST): UTC–5 (CDT)
- ZIP code: 57262
- Area code: 605
- FIPS code: 46-59260
- GNIS feature ID: 1267567
- Sales tax: 6.2%
- Website: sisseton.com

Sisseton (Dakota: Sisíthuŋwaŋ or Asisito) is a city in Roberts County, South Dakota, United States. The population was 2,479 at the 2020 census. It is the county seat of Roberts County. Sisseton is home to several tourist attractions, including the Nicollet Tower, and is near the "Song to the Great Spirit" building on the Sisseton Wahpeton College campus. The city is named for the Sisseton division of the Sioux people. It also serves as an important part of the Lake Traverse Indian Reservation.

== Geography ==
According to the United States Census Bureau, the city has an area of 1.59 square miles (4.12 km^{2}), all land.

=== Climate ===
Sisseton has a relatively dry, four-season, humid continental climate (Köppen: Dfb/Dfa), with long, dry, cold winters, hot summers, and brief spring and autumnal transitions; like much of the southern half of the state, it lies in USDA Plant Hardiness zone 5.

Climate data for Sisseton Municipal Airport, South Dakota (1991−2020 normals, (Note: Mean monthly maxima and minima (i.e. the highest and lowest temperature readings during an entire month or year) calculated based on data at said location from 1991 to 2020.) extremes 1931−present (Note: Records maintained at the airport since August 27, 1998, and at the Sisseton COOP before that.))
Month	Jan	Feb	Mar	Apr	May	Jun	Jul	Aug	Sep	Oct	Nov	Dec	Year
Record high °F (°C)	65 (18)	68 (20)	82 (28)	99 (37)	113 (45)	105 (41)	113 (45)	108 (42)	102 (39)	95 (35)	79 (26)	70 (21)	113 (45)
Mean maximum °F (°C)	46.0 (7.8)	47.7 (8.7)	62.4 (16.9)	79.2 (26.2)	88.9 (31.6)	91.8 (33.2)	94.2 (34.6)	92.1 (33.4)	89.4 (31.9)	81.4 (27.4)	63.6 (17.6)	48.1 (8.9)	96.4 (35.8)
Mean daily maximum °F (°C)	22.6 (−5.2)	27.0 (−2.8)	39.5 (4.2)	55.0 (12.8)	69.2 (20.7)	78.4 (25.8)	83.1 (28.4)	80.9 (27.2)	73.5 (23.1)	58.0 (14.4)	41.5 (5.3)	27.8 (−2.3)	54.7 (12.6)
Daily mean °F (°C)	13.3 (−10.4)	17.6 (−8.0)	29.9 (−1.2)	43.8 (6.6)	57.3 (14.1)	67.2 (19.6)	71.4 (21.9)	68.9 (20.5)	60.8 (16.0)	46.8 (8.2)	31.9 (−0.1)	19.1 (−7.2)	44.0 (6.7)
Mean daily minimum °F (°C)	4.1 (−15.5)	8.2 (−13.2)	20.4 (−6.4)	32.5 (0.3)	45.3 (7.4)	56.0 (13.3)	59.8 (15.4)	56.9 (13.8)	48.0 (8.9)	35.5 (1.9)	22.4 (−5.3)	10.4 (−12.0)	33.3 (0.7)
Mean minimum °F (°C)	−19.3 (−28.5)	−14.7 (−25.9)	−4.1 (−20.1)	16.3 (−8.7)	31.1 (−0.5)	43.8 (6.6)	48.3 (9.1)	44.7 (7.1)	31.8 (−0.1)	19.0 (−7.2)	3.6 (−15.8)	−12.5 (−24.7)	−21.8 (−29.9)
Record low °F (°C)	−37 (−38)	−33 (−36)	−29 (−34)	−3 (−19)	19 (−7)	32 (0)	40 (4)	35 (2)	22 (−6)	4 (−16)	−18 (−28)	−30 (−34)	−37 (−38)
Average precipitation inches (mm)	0.63 (16)	0.70 (18)	1.11 (28)	2.09 (53)	2.79 (71)	3.50 (89)	3.49 (89)	2.61 (66)	2.45 (62)	2.33 (59)	0.64 (16)	0.60 (15)	22.94 (583)
Average snowfall inches (cm)	6.2 (16)	7.3 (19)	6.1 (15)	5.6 (14)	0.0 (0.0)	0.0 (0.0)	0.0 (0.0)	0.0 (0.0)	0.0 (0.0)	1.0 (2.5)	4.6 (12)	5.5 (14)	36.3 (92)
Average precipitation days (≥ 0.01 in)	8.8	8.0	8.0	9.1	10.9	12.1	10.5	9.6	8.4	8.9	5.7	8.3	108.3
Average snowy days (≥ 0.1 in)	5.6	5.3	3.3	1.9	0.0	0.0	0.0	0.0	0.0	0.7	2.4	4.6	23.8
Source: NOAA

== Demographics ==
Historical population
Census	Pop.	Note	%±
1900	928		—
1910	1,397		50.5%
1920	1,431		2.4%
1930	1,569		9.6%
1940	2,513		60.2%
1950	2,871		14.2%
1960	3,218		12.1%
1970	3,094		−3.9%
1980	2,789		−9.9%
1990	2,181		−21.8%
2000	2,572		17.9%
2010	2,470		−4.0%
2020	2,479		0.4%
2022 (est.)	2,412		−2.7%
U.S. Decennial Census; 2020 Census

=== 2020 census ===
As of the 2020 census, Sisseton had a population of 2,479, and the median age was 35.8 years. 30.9% of residents were under the age of 18 and 20.0% of residents were 65 years of age or older. For every 100 females there were 90.4 males, and for every 100 females age 18 and over there were 86.0 males age 18 and over.

0.0% of residents lived in urban areas, while 100.0% lived in rural areas.

There were 944 households in Sisseton, of which 35.6% had children under the age of 18 living in them. Of all households, 30.2% were married-couple households, 23.0% were households with a male householder and no spouse or partner present, and 38.2% were households with a female householder and no spouse or partner present. About 36.2% of all households were made up of individuals and 18.8% had someone living alone who was 65 years of age or older.

There were 1,036 housing units, of which 8.9% were vacant. The homeowner vacancy rate was 1.2% and the rental vacancy rate was 4.6%.

Racial composition as of the 2020 census
Race	Number	Percent
White	919	37.1%
Black or African American	9	0.4%
American Indian and Alaska Native	1,320	53.2%
Asian	12	0.5%
Native Hawaiian and Other Pacific Islander	0	0.0%
Some other race	21	0.8%
Two or more races	198	8.0%
Hispanic or Latino (of any race)	92	3.7%

=== 2010 census ===
As of the census of 2010, there were 2,470 people, 958 households, and 576 families living in the city. The population density was 1,553.5 inhabitants per square mile (599.8/km^{2}). There were 1,057 housing units at an average density of 664.8 per square mile (256.7/km^{2}). The racial makeup of the city was 47.0% White, 0.1% African American, 47.8% Native American, 0.4% Asian, 0.2% from other races, and 4.5% from two or more races. Hispanic or Latino of any race were 1.6% of the population.

There were 958 households, of which 36.3% had children under the age of 18 living with them, 34.2% were married couples living together, 17.1% had a female householder with no husband present, 8.8% had a male householder with no wife present, and 39.9% were non-families. 34.9% of all households were made up of individuals, and 16.3% had someone living alone who was 65 years of age or older. The average household size was 2.48 and the average family size was 3.22.

The median age in the city was 34.6 years. 29.7% of residents were under the age of 18; 9% were between the ages of 18 and 24; 22.1% were from 25 to 44; 21.9% were from 45 to 64; and 17.4% were 65 years of age or older. The gender makeup of the city was 48.1% male and 51.9% female.

=== 2000 census ===
As of the census of 2000, there were 2,572 people, 1,003 households, and 631 families living in the city. The population density was 1,636.7 inhabitants per square mile (631.9/km^{2}). There were 1,093 housing units at an average density of 695.5 per square mile (268.5/km^{2}). The racial makeup of the city was 56.07% White, 0.12% African American, 40.86% Native American, 0.27% Asian, 0.04% from other races, and 2.64% from two or more races. Hispanic or Latino of any race were 1.09% of the population.

There were 1,003 households, out of which 31.9% had children under the age of 18 living with them, 38.9% were married couples living together, 16.9% had a female householder with no husband present, and 37.0% were non-families. 34.6% of all households were made up of individuals, and 16.2% had someone living alone who was 65 years of age or older. The average household size was 2.46 and the average family size was 3.12.

In the city, the population was spread out, with 29.3% under the age of 18, 8.2% from 18 to 24, 23.3% from 25 to 44, 20.8% from 45 to 64, and 18.4% who were 65 years of age or older. The median age was 36 years. For every 100 females, there were 88.8 males. For every 100 females age 18 and over, there were 86.2 males.

As of 2000 the median income for a household in the city was $26,698, and the median income for a family was $33,977. Males had a median income of $27,393 versus $20,586 for females. The per capita income for the city was $14,019. About 14.9% of families and 18.4% of the population were below the poverty line, including 23.6% of those under age 18 and 16.4% of those age 65 or over.

== Education ==
Sisseton Wahpeton College, a small college that is part of Sisseton Wahpeton Oyate, is near Sisseton in Agency Village. The college offers undergraduate and vocational degrees. About 80% of the college's 250 students are Dakota people.

Sisseton School District 54-9 has four schools: Sisseton High School, Sisseton Middle School, New Effington Elementary, and Westside Elementary.

Tiospa Zina Tribal School, a tribal K-12 school in Agency Village, is 6 miles (9.7 km) from Sisseton. it is Bureau of Indian Education (BIE)-affiliated.

== Media ==
=== FM radio ===
FM radio stations
Frequency	Call sign	Name	Format	Owner	Target city/market	City of license
89.9 FM	KXSW		Country/Rock	Corporation for Native Broadcasting	Sisseton	Sisseton
99.5 FM	KJKQ	Jack FM	Adult Hits	Armada Media	Sisseton	Sisseton
102.9 FM	KBWS-FM	Pheasant Country 103	Country	Armada Media	Sisseton	Sisseton

== Transportation ==
Intercity bus service to the city is provided by Jefferson Lines.

== Notable people ==
- Joe Donnell, politician
- Greg Long, musician
- Lowell Lundstrom, American evangelist and musician
- "Mean" Gene Okerlund, professional wrestling interviewer
- Gabriel Renville, last chief of the Sisseton-Wahpeton Sioux tribe
- Joe Robbie, original owner of the Miami Dolphins
- Floyd Westerman, actor
- Cynthia MacAdams, actress and photographer
- Woodrow Wilson Keeble WWII Korean War Medal Of Honor 1st Sioux awardee is buried in Sisseton cemetery
