= New Effington, South Dakota =

- Town
- Location in Roberts County and the state of South Dakota
- Coordinates: 45°51′21″N 96°55′02″W
- Country: United States
- State: South Dakota
- County: Roberts
- Incorporated: 1914

Area
  - Total: 0.27 sq mi (0.70 km^{2})
  - Land: 0.26 sq mi (0.68 km^{2})
  - Water: 0.012 sq mi (0.03 km^{2})
- Elevation: 1,096 ft (334 m)

Population (2020)
  - Total: 234
  - Density: 895.7/sq mi (345.84/km^{2})
- Time zone: UTC-6 (Central (CST))
  - Summer (DST): UTC-5 (CDT)
- ZIP code: 57255
- Area code: 605
- FIPS code: 46-44820
- GNIS feature ID: 1267490

New Effington is a town in Roberts County, South Dakota, United States. The population was 234 at the 2020 census. In 1965 the high school team won the district basketball tournament in Sisseton. As part of a school approved event and classroom project, the senior class of 1965 held a memorial tribute north of the school for Nevermore, the class pet raven.

New Effington was laid out in 1913, after a proposed railroad further away from the original city Effington spurred the need to move the town. Needing a new name they simply added "New", the original being a reference to one of the first women (named Ellie) to get a homestead in the original town.

== Geography ==
According to the United States Census Bureau, the town has a total area of 0.27 square miles (0.70 km^{2}), of which 0.26 square miles (0.67 km^{2}) is land and 0.01 square miles (0.03 km^{2}) is water.

== Demographics ==
Historical population
Census	Pop.	Note	%±
1920	305		—
1930	337		10.5%
1940	344		2.1%
1950	367		6.7%
1960	280		−23.7%
1970	258		−7.9%
1980	261		1.2%
1990	219		−16.1%
2000	233		6.4%
2010	256		9.9%
2020	234		−8.6%
U.S. Decennial Census

=== 2010 census ===
As of the census of 2010, there were 256 people, 107 households, and 65 families residing in the town. The population density was 984.6 inhabitants per square mile (380.2/km^{2}). There were 121 housing units at an average density of 465.4 per square mile (179.7/km^{2}). The racial makeup of the town was 57.8% White, 0.4% African American, 36.3% Native American, 0.8% from other races, and 4.7% from two or more races. Hispanic or Latino of any race were 0.8% of the population.

There were 107 households, of which 29.9% had children under the age of 18 living with them, 42.1% were married couples living together, 14.0% had a female householder with no husband present, 4.7% had a male householder with no wife present, and 39.3% were non-families. 35.5% of all households were made up of individuals, and 18.7% had someone living alone who was 65 years of age or older. The average household size was 2.39 and the average family size was 3.08.

The median age in the town was 39 years. 28.5% of residents were under the age of 18; 10.1% were between the ages of 18 and 24; 19.1% were from 25 to 44; 20.7% were from 45 to 64; and 21.5% were 65 years of age or older. The gender makeup of the town was 46.1% male and 53.9% female.

=== 2000 census ===
As of the census of 2000, there were 233 people, 105 households, and 59 families residing in the town. The population density was 889.5 inhabitants per square mile (343.4/km^{2}). There were 117 housing units at an average density of 446.7 per square mile (172.5/km^{2}). The racial makeup of the town was 72.96% White and 27.04% Native American.

There were 105 households, out of which 23.8% had children under the age of 18 living with them, 46.7% were married couples living together, 7.6% had a female householder with no husband present, and 42.9% were non-families. 41.0% of all households were made up of individuals, and 28.6% had someone living alone who was 65 years of age or older. The average household size was 2.22 and the average family size was 3.08.

In the town, the population was spread out, with 25.8% under the age of 18, 6.0% from 18 to 24, 20.2% from 25 to 44, 18.5% from 45 to 64, and 29.6% who were 65 years of age or older. The median age was 42 years. For every 100 females, there were 87.9 males. For every 100 females age 18 and over, there were 80.2 males.

The median income for a household in the town was $20,909, and the median income for a family was $28,125. Males had a median income of $20,313 versus $18,125 for females. The per capita income for the town was $16,055. About 11.1% of families and 22.1% of the population were below the poverty line, including 28.3% of those under the age of eighteen and 19.7% of those 65 or over.
