= Keenum =

Keenum is a surname. Notable people with the surname include:

- Case Keenum (born 1988), American football player
- Mark Keenum (born 1961), American collegiate president
- Rhonda Keenum (born 1961), American lobbyist
