= Chris Dodd 2008 presidential campaign =

2008 presidential campaign of Connecticut Senator Chris Dodd

Chris Dodd for President 2008
- Campaign: U.S. presidential election, 2008
- Candidate: Chris Dodd; U.S. senator from Connecticut (1981–2011)
- Affiliation: Democratic Party
- Headquarters: Hartford, Connecticut
- Key people: Sheryl Cohen (manager); Jim Jordan (senior advisor)
- Receipts: US$16.5 (2007-12-31)
- Slogan: Restoring America's Standing in the World

Website
- chrisdodd.com (archived - April 2, 2008)

The 2008 presidential campaign of Chris Dodd was launched on January 11, 2007, and ended on January 3, 2008, after a sixth-place finish in the Iowa caucuses. Dodd, the senior senator from Connecticut, sought the nomination of the Democratic Party for president of the United States. Centering his campaign in the states of Iowa and New Hampshire, he centred his campaign on the theme of change. Dodd's performance in the opinion polls varied, but in the financial sphere, he had secured some notable and influential endorsements who were the ones largely funding his campaign.

Dodd tried to follow in the pattern of New Englanders who entered the race for the Democratic nomination and won, including John Kerry, Michael Dukakis, and John F. Kennedy. If elected, Dodd would have become the second Roman Catholic president (after Kennedy) and the second Connecticut-born president (after George W. Bush). He would have been the first senator to win the presidency while in office since Kennedy was elected in 1960 (that honor ultimately went to Barack Obama). After his withdrawal from the race, Dodd went on to endorse the eventual winner Barack Obama, and retired from the Senate in 2011.

== Background ==
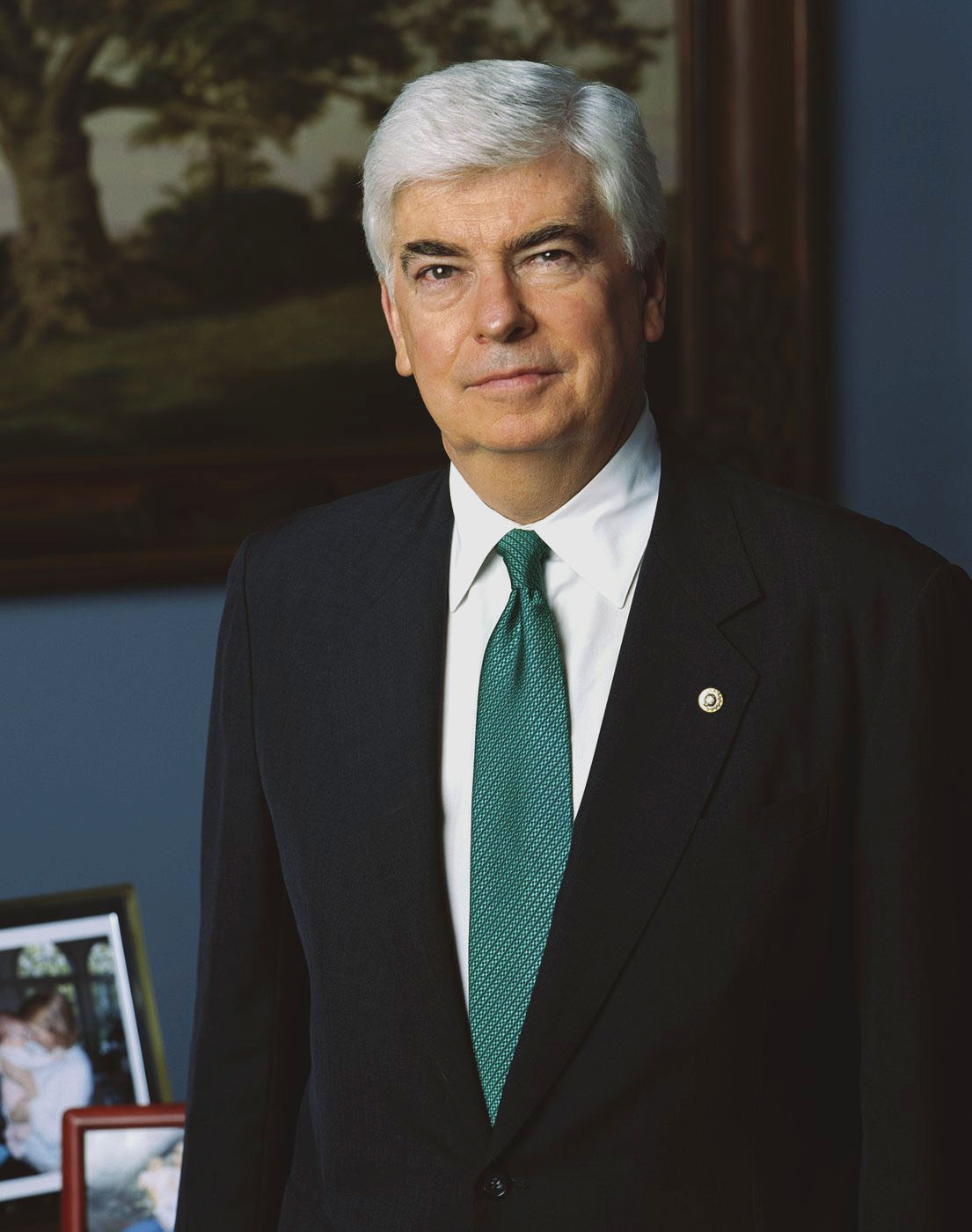
Senator Chris Dodd (D-CT)

During his years in the House and Senate, Dodd built a long record of political positions on important issues to the nation. He was in favor of ending the Iraq War and redeploying American soldiers from the nation elsewhere. He repeatedly voted against further funding of the war. To combat global warming, he proposed a carbon tax to reduce carbon emissions, and declared that the United States "must take a 'strategic pause'" before signing any new free trade agreement.

Domestically, Dodd proposed mandatory community service for all high school students, and fought to improve child care and health care, and worked to stop predatory lending by credit card companies. He also introduced legislation to enact a Federal shield law and worked to defeat legislation permitting warrantless surveillance.

Dodd had told the Associated Press in April 2006 that he was considering running, and by May 22 he had met with key backers, including congresswoman Rosa DeLauro, and had assembled a team to prepare a potential 2008 campaign. In June 2006, he held his first major fundraiser, stunning Beltway commentators by raising over $1 million in one night. Dodd attended a Florida Democratic convention in July 2006 to garner further support. He hired former John Kerry campaign manager Jim Jordan in December of that year. Two months later, Dodd told the head of the New Hampshire Democratic Party at the Rainbow Cafe that he was not "going to do the exploratory thing" but instead "plunge right in" to the race.

== On the campaign trail ==
=== January 2007 ===
January 2007 events

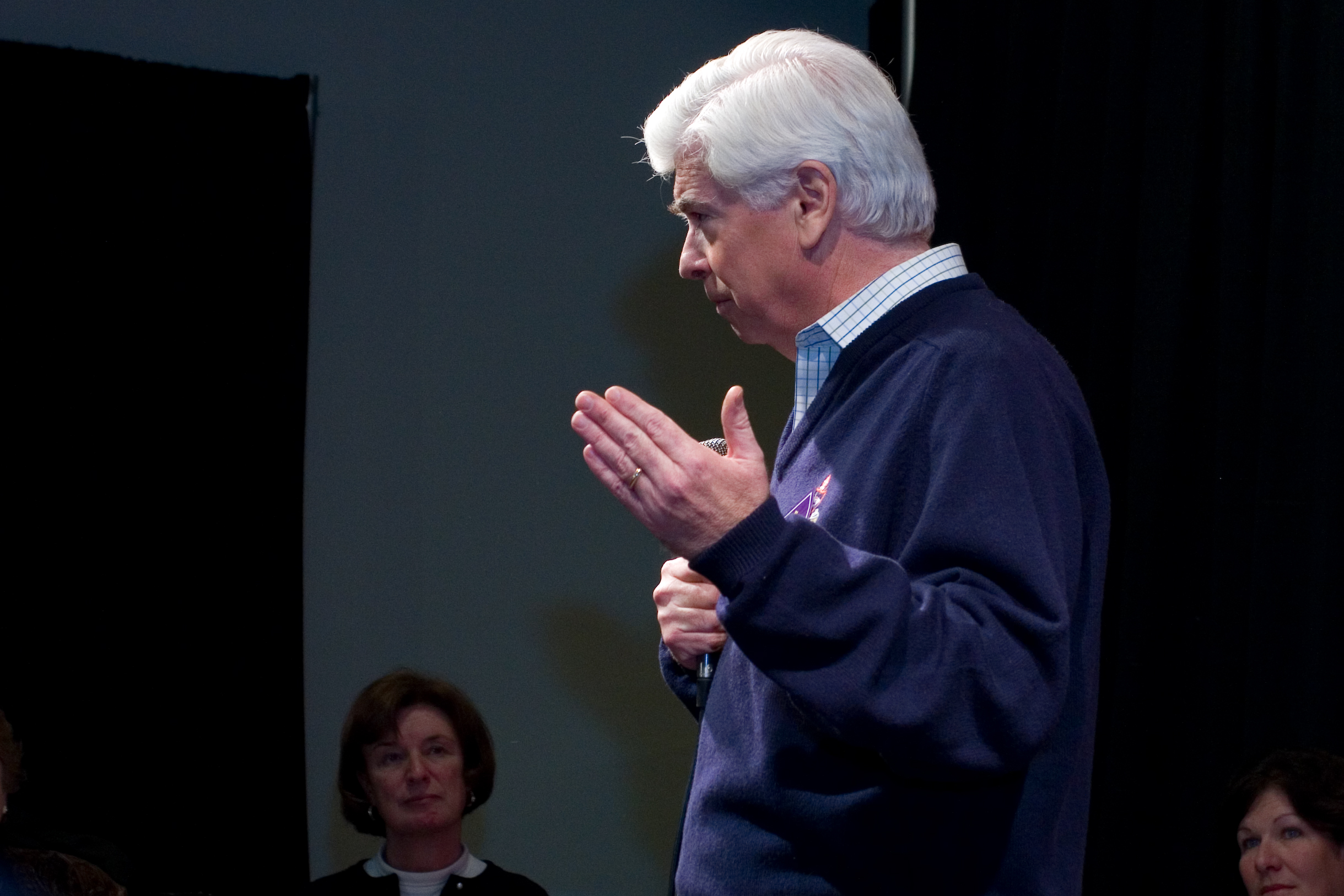
Dodd speaks at a Town Hall in Dover, New Hampshire

Date	Location(s)	Event(s)
January 15	West Columbia, SC; Columbia, SC	Speeches, Appearance
January 19	Hartford, CT	Rally
January 20	Dover, NH; Deerfield, NH; Henniker, NH	Speech, Meeting, Appearance
January 21	Hanover, NH	Speech

Chris Dodd entered the race on January 11, 2007, after making his announcement on the Imus in the Morning show. He cited his qualifications of experience and background as the strengths needed to lead the nation as president. A critic of the Iraq War, Dodd stated that his candidacy "...isn't just [about] Iraq -- there are problems here at home that are huge." He decided not to file with the FEC under an exploratory committee but instead filed as a full-fledged candidate. He began campaigning in the state of South Carolina on January 15, 2007, and hit the trails to New Hampshire on January 20.

=== February 2007 ===
February 2007 events

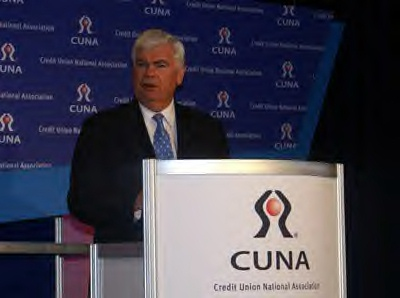
Chris Dodd addressing the Credit Union National Association on February 15, 2007

Date	Location(s)	Event(s)
February 15	Nashua, NH; Portsmouth, NH	Appearance, Meeting
February 16	Bedford, NH; Keene, NH	Speech, Meeting
February 19	Des Moines, IA	Speech
February 20	Iowa City, IA; Cedar Rapids, IA	Fundraiser, Meeting
February 21	Carson City, NV	Forum

In February, Dodd turned his attention fully to the early primary states of Iowa and New Hampshire. When asked by the Associated Press on the campaign trail if his campaigning really made a difference in changing public perceptions, he replied, "There is enough time yet to change this [public perceptions], because there are places like Iowa and New Hampshire that give candidates like myself a chance to be heard." Dodd's strategy was to speak to voters in restaurants, homes, and small-town diners, although political analysts wondered whether such methods were out-of-date. But he maintained that "chatting in a living room face to face is still a very important feature of campaigning here. I don't think you can come in here and do sort of a wholesale political operation from 35,000 feet (11,000 m) with a pit stop here and there and a media campaign behind you." At the end of February, Dodd differentiated himself from his Democratic counterparts by stating his support for the Bush administration's willingness to hold joint talks with Iran and Syria and by stating that as president he would avoid talking with Iran as long as Mahmoud Ahmadinejad remained as president. On the trail, he referred to Ahmadinejad as a "thug".

=== March 2007 ===
March 2007 events

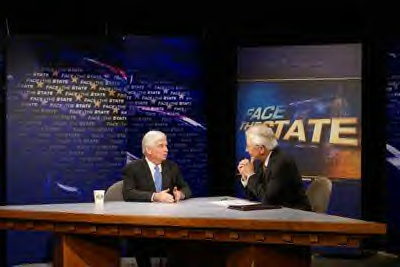
Chris Dodd discusses his campaign on a March 2007 edition of Face the State

Date	Location(s)	Event(s)
March 14	Washington D.C	Speech, Forum
March 17	Concord, NH; Hampton, NH	Speeches
March 18	Manchester, NH	Speech
March 23	Las Vegas, NV	Rally
March 24	Las Vegas, NV; Henderson, NV	Forum, Ceremony
March 28	Washington D.C.	Speech, Forum

Before Dodd hit the campaign trail for March after a round of campaigning in February, he made a visit to The Daily Show with Jon Stewart, a well-worn path laid by candidates trying to reach a younger audience. The campaign set up a web page before the March 13 interview. Liberal bloggers praised the behind the scenes look at the campaign as innovative and creative. A posting on the Comedy Central show's blog read: "This was a fascinating look behind the scenes of the show even for us, and a surprisingly cool thing for a Presidential candidate to do. Senator Dodd, we salute both your commitment to fiscal responsibility and your web-savvy." After the visit Dodd campaigned in New Hampshire and Nevada finishing the month at a forums in Las Vegas and Washington, D.C. At the Las Vegas Forum, he discussed health care with the other Democratic candidates and voiced his support for a system of Universal Health Care. As March came to a close the campaign revealed their fundraising total for the First Quarter. Dodd raised $4,043,757 in this quarter, spend $1,313,239 and had $7,482,467 cash on hand.

=== April 2007 ===
April 2007 events

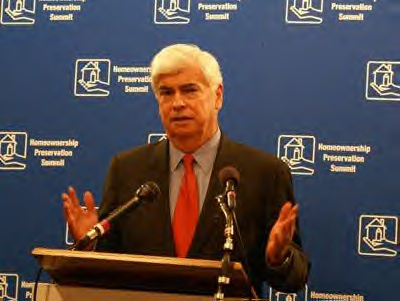
Chris Dodd addressing the Homeownership Preservation Summit in April 2007

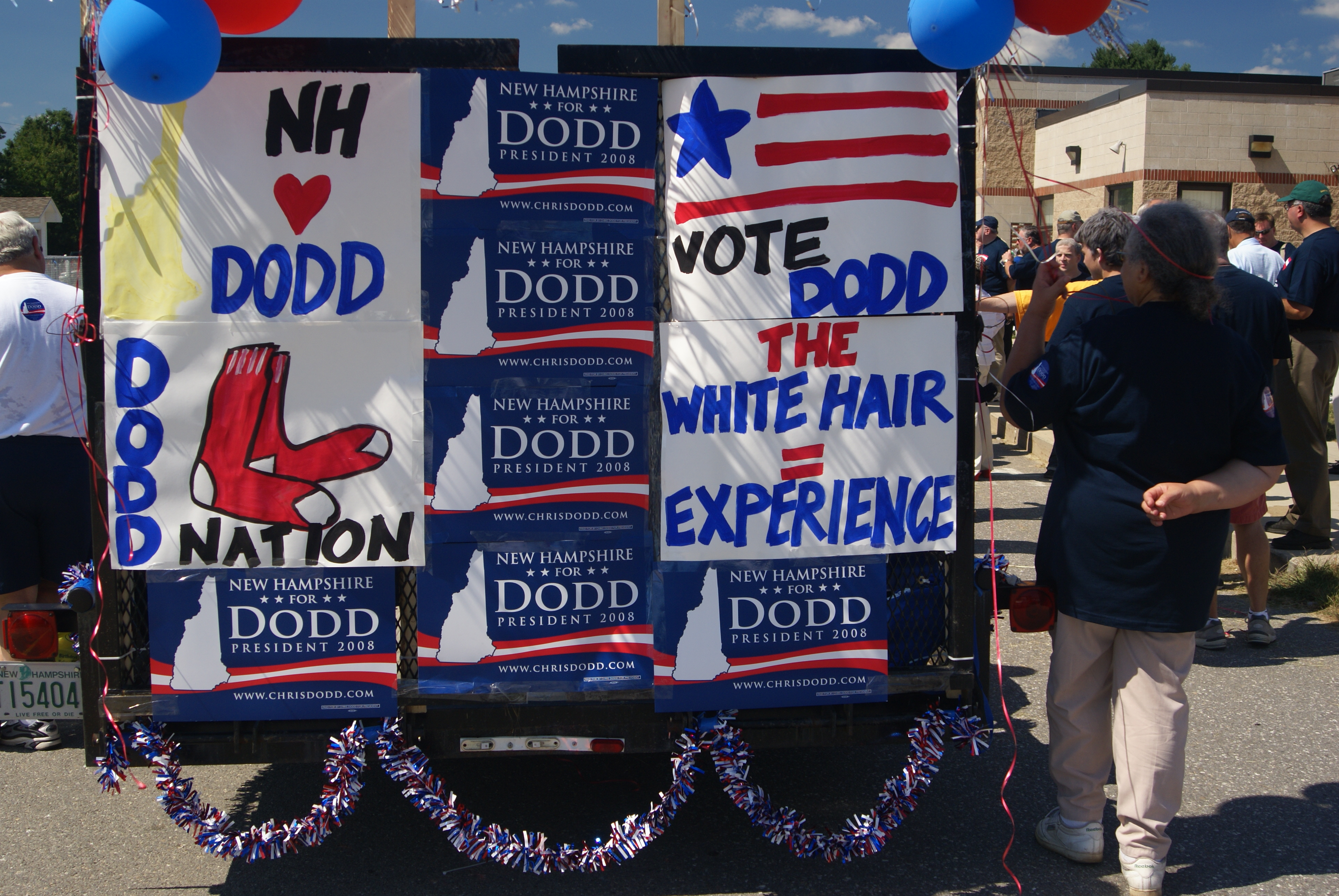
Dodd campaign signs in New Hampshire highlight the importance of the first primary state

Date	Location(s)	Event(s)
April 3	Laconia, NH	Meeting
April 4	Concord, NH; Manchester, NH	Town Hall, Speech
April 10	Wilmington, DE	Town Hall
April 11	Des Moines, IA	Speech, Meeting
April 12	Des Moines, IA; Ames, IA	Meetings, Speech
April 13	Pahrump, NV	Town Hall
April 19	Washington D.C; New York City, NY; Manchester, NH	Speeches, Ceremony
April 20	Hooksett, NH; Hartford, CT	Speeches
April 21	Conway, NH; Plymouth, NH; Littleton, NH	Meeting, House Parties
April 22	Keene, NH	Speech
April 23	Boston, MA	Debate
April 24	Washington, D.C.	Speech
April 26	Orangeburg, SC	Debate, Party Event
April 27	Orangeburg, SC; Charleston, SC; Columbia, SC; San Diego, CA	Meeting, Forum, Party Events, Speech
April 28	San Diego, CA	Speech
April 29	Sacramento, CA	Town Hall

In April, Dodd campaigned in New Hampshire, Iowa, and returned to South Carolina. While on the trail Dodd participated in a virtual town hall sponsored by the website MoveOn.org. When he was asked the question "...what is the best and fastest way to get out of Iraq?" he answered, "We ought to start redeploying this evening...We ought to begin immediately. I would not wait any longer." Continuing on the trail, Dodd sponsored what was called by The Washington Post, the "most radical plan" to combat global warming. It included a corporate carbon tax to be levied on corporations to reduce carbon emissions. The plan is part of a larger energy platform of the campaign.

On April 26, Dodd participated in the first of many Democratic presidential debates. His campaign has been critical of how little time their candidate has been allotted to speak at the debates, and its website introduced a "Talk Clock" demonstrating this disparity.

At the end of the month, Dodd set his sights on the state with the most convention votes, California by attending events in Sacramento and San Diego.

=== May 2007 ===
May 2007 events

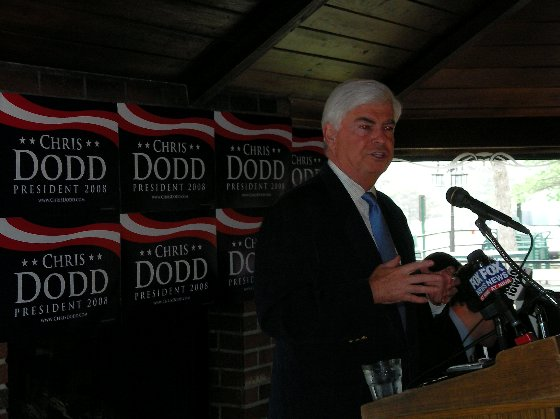
Dodd campaigning in Iowa in May 2007

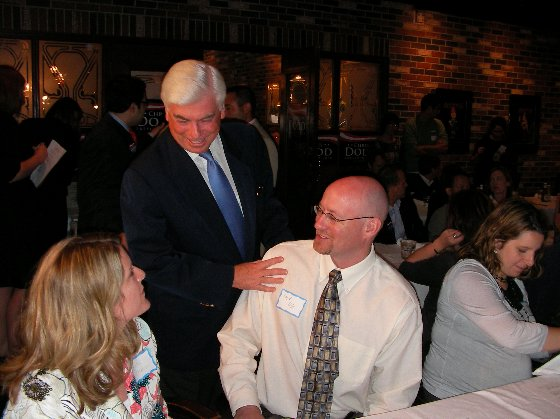
Dodd greets supporters in Iowa

Date	Location(s)	Event(s)
May 2	San Francisco, CA	Speech
May 3	West Des Moines, IA	Forum
May 4	Ottumwa, IA; Mt. Pleasant, IA; Keokuk, IA	Meetings, Appearances, Townhall
May 5	Burlington, IA; West Liberty, IA; West Branch, IA; Muscatine, IA	Meetings, Appearance, Townhall
May 11	Fort Mill, SC; Portsmouth, NH; Madbury, NH; Manchester, NH	Appearance, Meetings, House Party
May 12	Milford, NH; Merrimack, NH; Bow, NH	Appearance, House Parties
May 17	Dubuque, IA	Speech
May 18	Des Moines, IA	Townhall
May 26	Laconia, NH; Barrington, NH; Portsmouth, NH	House Parties

Early in May, Dodd continued to campaign in California for a few days but later shifted back to the strategically important states of Iowa and New Hampshire for the rest of the month. On May 15 the campaign released its first ad, which detailed his plan for ending the war in Iraq. In the ad, Dodd also criticized his fellow Democratic candidates by stating, "We can't simply wait for a new president. We should have the conviction to stand up to this one," In Washington, Dodd was exposed to debate on the Iraq War Spending Bill and new videos from al-Qaeda's second in command Ayman al-Zawahiri. Back on the campaign trail he talked about how he would deal with foreign issues particularly in regards to the situation in Iraq, "I'm not going to let my foreign policy be decided by Mr. al-Zawahiri. Obviously, he's playing his game here. He'd probably like to see us stay down there, bogged down, at the costs we're increasing here, the loss of lives, not to mention the isolation of the United States." When Presidential candidate John Edwards released an ad criticizing Congress' failure to end the Iraq War, Dodd took it personal and shot back at Edwards stating, ""With all due respect, we could have used John's vote here in the Senate on these issues here." He concluded the May campaign by attending House parties in three cities in New Hampshire. .

=== June 2007 ===
June 2007 events

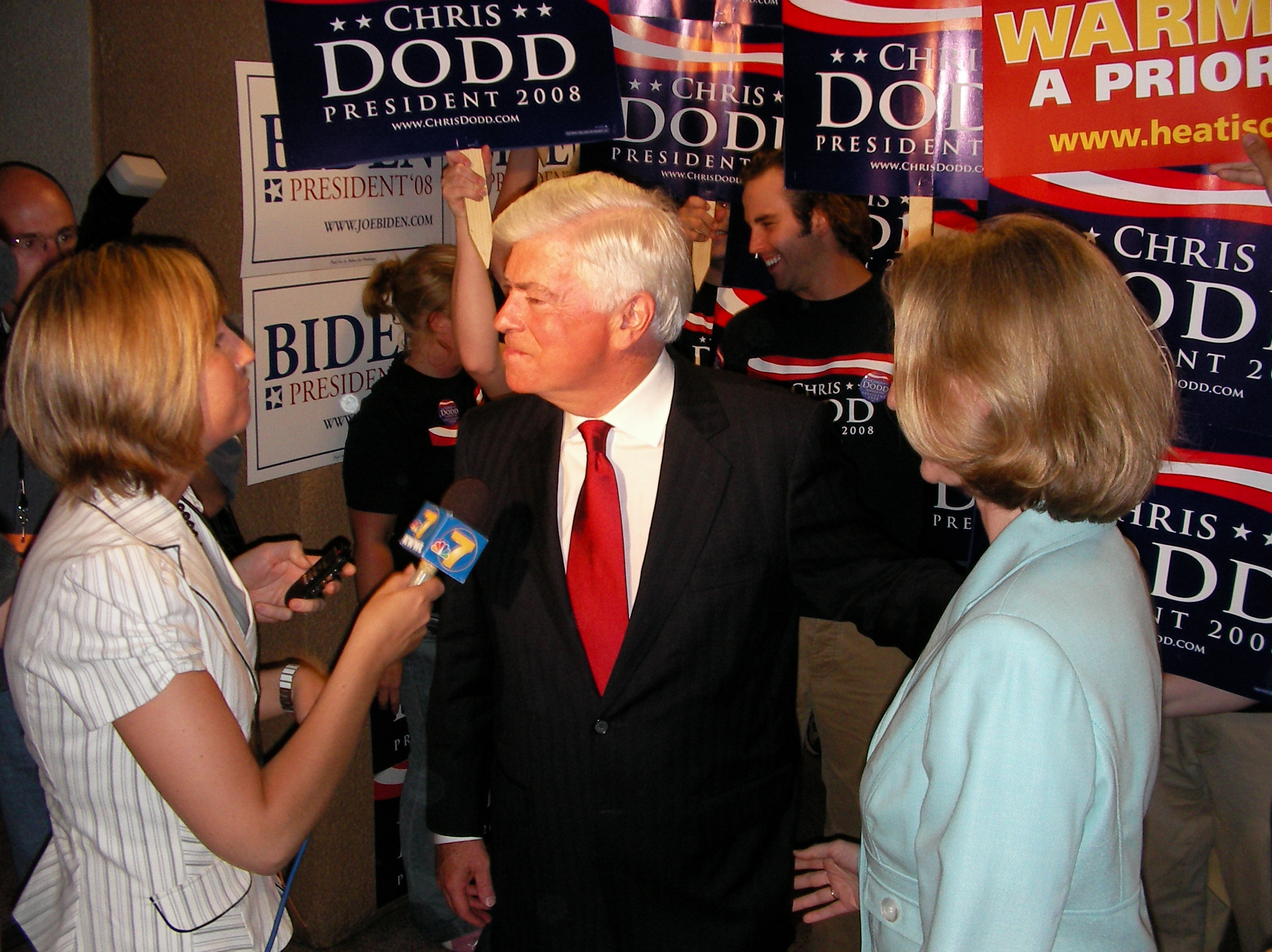
Dodd speaks to the media in June 2007

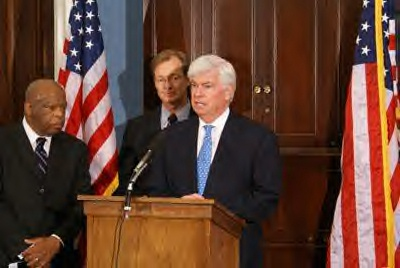
Dodd delivers a speech on civil rights in June 2007

Date	Location	Event
June 2	Cedar Rapids, IA; Concord, NH	Speeches
June 3	Manchester, NH	Appearance, Debate
June 8	New York City, NY	Speech
June 9	Waterloo, IA; Waverly, IA; Mason City, IA	Meetings, Townhall
June 10	Sioux City, IA	Townhall
June 11	New York City, NY	Fundraiser
June 23	Hartford, CT; Amherst, NH; Nashua, NH; Manchester, NH	Appearance, House Parties, Town Hall
June 24	Rochester, NH; Concord, NH	Meetings
June 25	Iowa City, IA; Cedar Rapids, IA	Appearance, Meeting
June 26	Iowa City, IA	Speech
June 28	Washington D.C	Forum
June 30	Lake Buena Vista, FL	Forum

June started off as all the previous months had, with Dodd campaigning in New Hampshire and Iowa, but at the June 3 debate in Manchester he made a notable statement that led to a huge applause from the crowd. During the debate he pointed out a woman in the audience whose husband was fighting in the war on terrorism, he thanked her for the sacrifice and stated the importance of standing up for America's security while on the campaign trail, "No one is going to be elected president who is not going to have as their primary responsibility to keep us safe and secure." After the debate Dodd went back to the trails, but while campaigning he found a new tool to help spread his message. The campaign encouraged voters to confront politicians with video cameras and ask them to talk about Iraq and to support the "Dodd Amendment" which would have required American troops to start redeployment in 30 days. The final step was for the voters to post the interactions on YouTube. The Dodd campaign has used the internet more frequently than other campaigns, often airing staff meetings via the web. The campaign released a new advertisement on June 16 entitled "Amazing Grace" which focused on Dodd's time in the Peace Corps. As June came to a close Dodd made his final appearance of the month at a forum in Lake Buena Vista, Florida, the first time he visited the state which moved up its primary dates, causing a controversy with the DNC. On June 30 the campaign revealed the fundraising totals for the second quarter, Dodd raised $3,250,730, spent $4,384,580 and had a total of $6,378,271 cash on hand.

=== July 2007 ===
July 2007 events

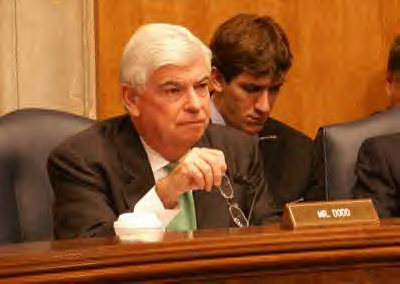
Dodd discusses the peace corps in the Senate in July 2007

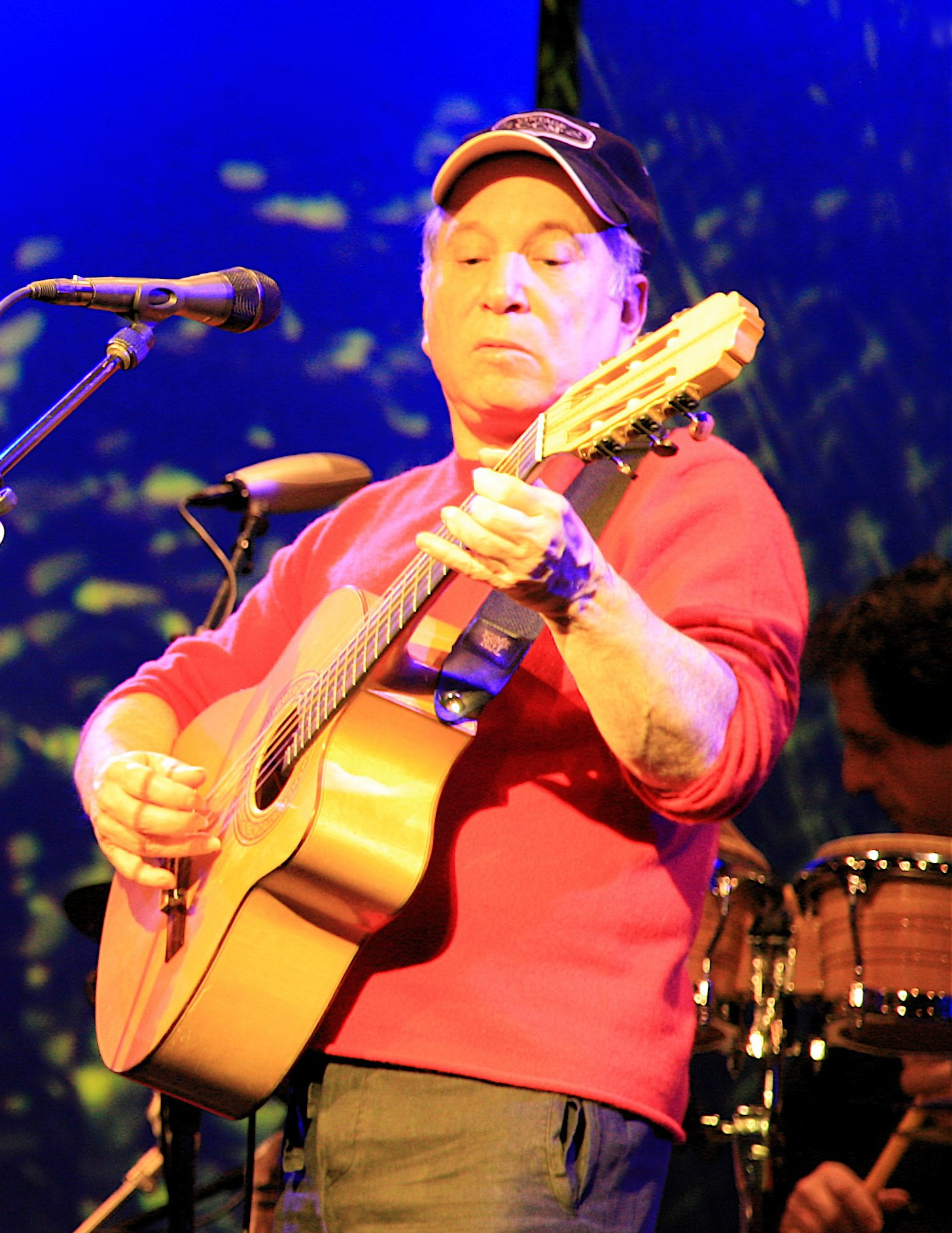
Singer Paul Simon joined Dodd on the campaign trail in July 2007

Date	Location(s)	Event(s)
July 2	Philadelphia, PA	Speech
July 3	Davenport, IA; Burlington, IA; Ottumwa, IA; Des Moines, IA	Appearances, Townhall, Meeting
July 4	Norwalk, IA; Pleasantville, IA; Wellman, IA; Coralville, IA; Cedar Rapids, IA	Appearances, Meeting
July 5	Clinton, IA; Dubuque, IA; Waterloo, IA; Waverly, IA	Appearances
July 6	Mason City, IA; Fort Dodge, IA; Sioux City, IA	Appearances
July 7	Carroll, IA; Council Bluffs, IA	Appearances
July 10	Fort Dodge, IA	Appearance
July 12	Detroit, MI; Las Vegas, NV	Forum, Appearance
July 13	Reno, NV; Carson City, NV	Town Halls, Appearance
July 15	Salem, NH; Plymouth, NH	Appearance, Meeting
July 16	Berlin, NH; Grantham, NH	Appearance, House Party
July 20	Des Moines, IA	Appearance
July 21	Des Moines, IA	Meetings, Appearances
July 22	Indianola, IA; Londonderry, NH; Orangeburg, SC	Meetings, Ceremony
July 23	Charleston, SC	Debate, Appearance
July 26	Marion, IA; Waterloo, IA	House Parties
July 27	Dyersville, IA; Dubuque, IA; West Union, IA	Meetings
July 28	Waukon, IA; Elkader, IA; Anamosa, IA; North Liberty, IA	Meetings, Appearance

Early in July, the Dodd campaign's strategy to use social networking sites was documented by the press. The campaign uses the network MyLifeBrand which allows Dodd supporters to be linked to other users from other social networking websites. The goal was to bring supporters together and attract new supporters. On July 6 singer Paul Simon joined Dodd on the campaign trail in Iowa as Dodd embarked on a five-day "River to River" tour in a big blue bus with the name "Dodd" etched on the side. Dodd simultaneously continued his campaign on the web airing live staff meetings and a live chatroom on July 23. The campaign launched a show called D-TV which the Washington Post labeled as the "political Truman Show". On July 23, he participated in the YouTube debate broadcast on CNN. Dodd was fielded many questions during the debate including the very first. He received questions ranging from discussion about his hair to Iraq. When asked about his position on gay marriage, he stated:

I've made the case, Anderson, that -- my wife and I have two young daughters, age 5 and 2. I'd simply ask the audience to ask themselves the question that Jackie and I have asked: How would I want my two daughters treated if they grew up and had a different sexual orientation than their parents? Good jobs, equal opportunity, to be able to retire, to visit each other, to be with each other, as other people do. So I feel very strongly, if you ask yourself the question, "How would you like your children treated if they had a different sexual orientation than their parents?," the answer is yes. They ought to have that ability in civil unions. I don't go so far as to call for marriage. I believe marriage is between a man and a woman. But my state of Connecticut, the state of New Hampshire, have endorsed civil unions. I strongly support that. But I don't go so far as marriage.

— Chris Dodd

When asked to comment about the genocide in Darfur and the moral leadership of the United States, Dodd answered that the situation in "Iraq is related to Darfur, Anderson, here. It's because we're bogged down there at $10 billion a month, we've lost our moral leadership in the world. No one listens to us when it comes to foreign policy. That has to change in this country. That's the difference here." July campaigning wrapped up in Iowa with visits to seven cities in two days from July 27–28.

=== August 2007 ===
August 2007 events

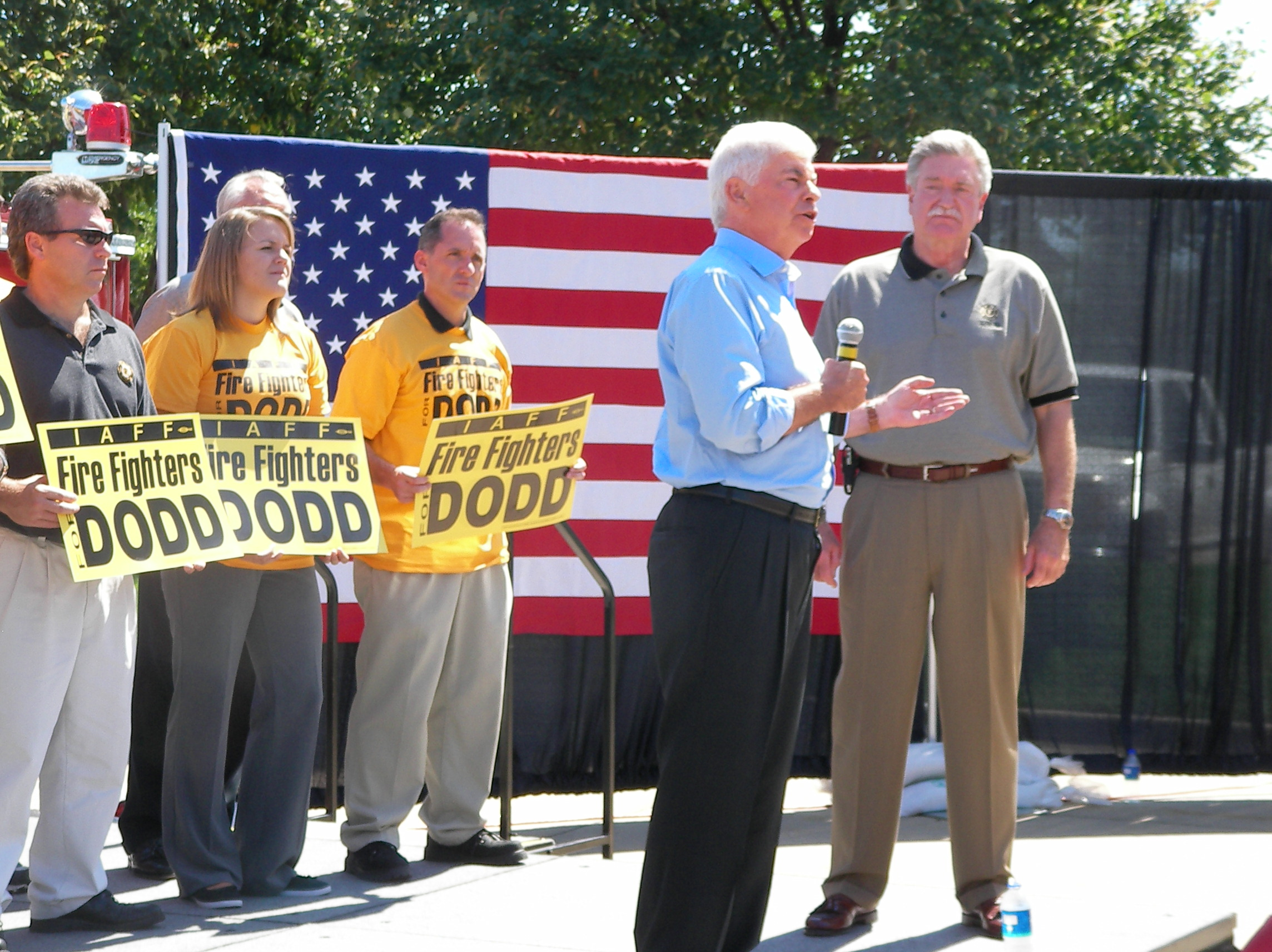
Dodd received the endorsement of the International Association of Fire Fighters who joined him on the trail in August 2007

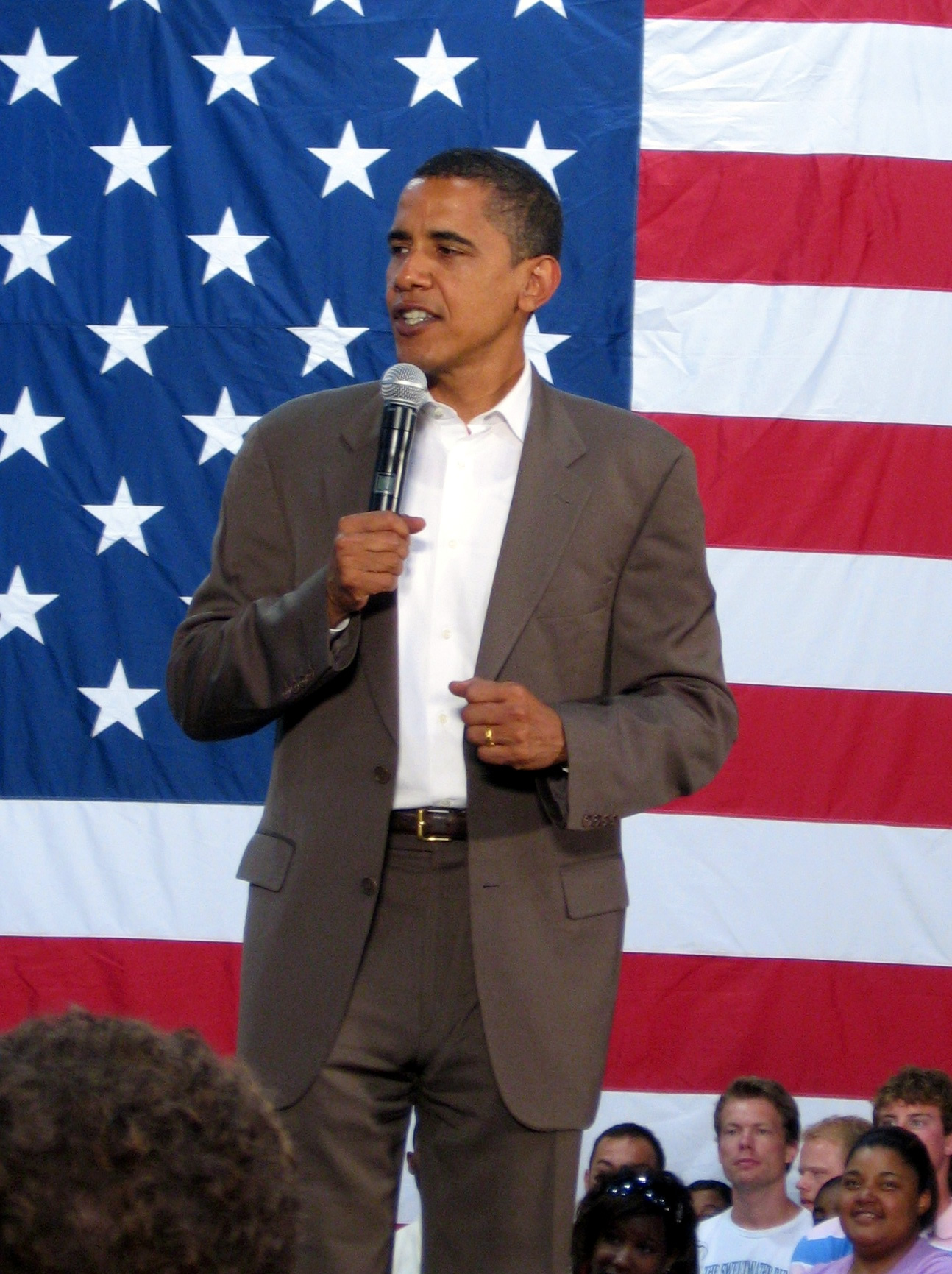
Dodd and Barack Obama got into an argument over a possible invasion of Pakistan

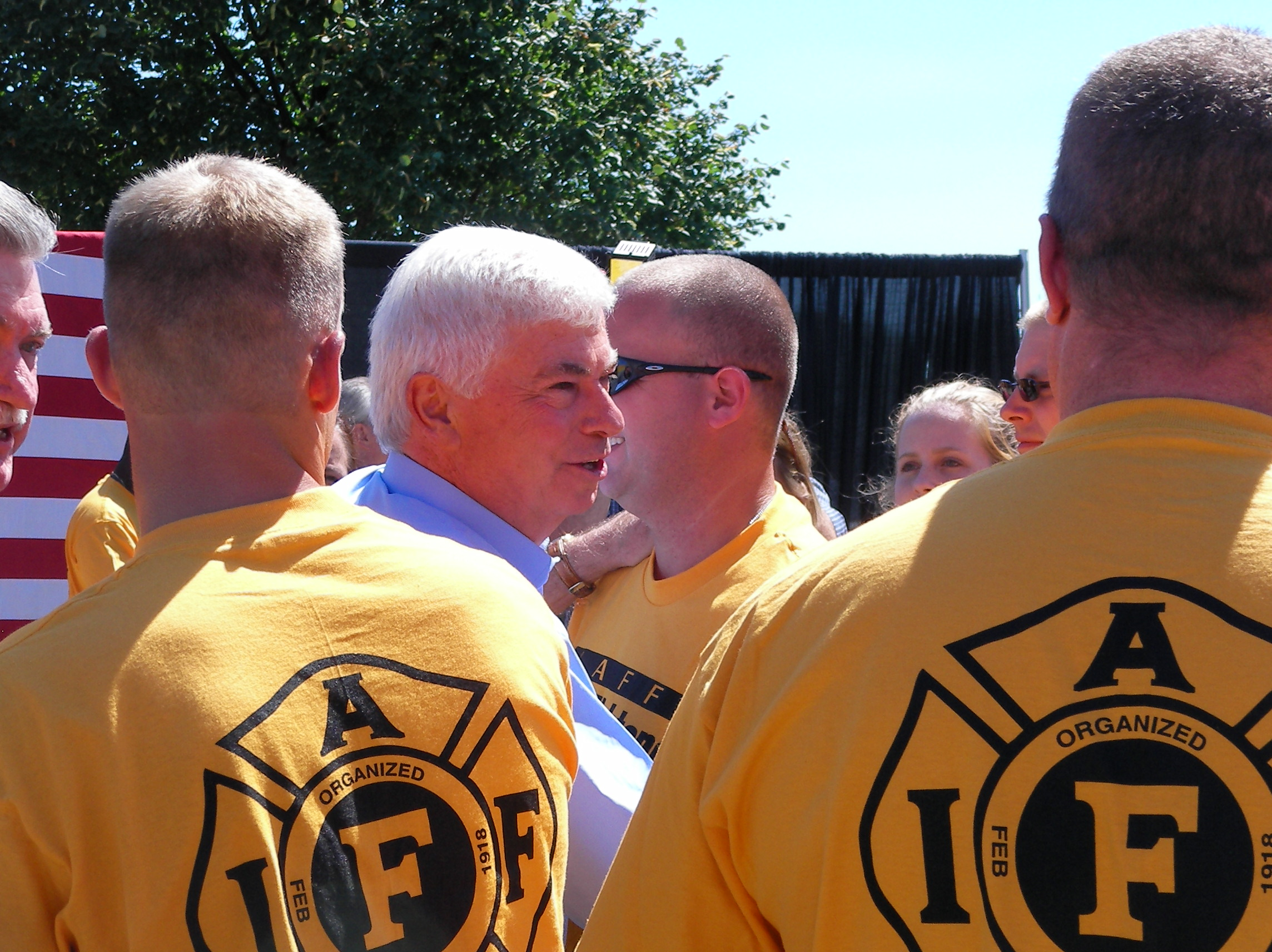
Dodd campaigning with the International Association of Fire Fighters in August 2007

Date	Location(s)	Event(s)
August 4	Chicago, IL; Las Vegas, NV	Forum, Appearances
August 5	Boulder City, NV	Meeting
August 8	Manchester, NH; Concord, NH	Forum, House Party
August 9	Bartlett, NH; Tilton, NH; Nelson, NH; Studio City, CA	Speech, Meetings, Forum
August 10	Peterborough, NH; Nashua, NH; Manchester, NH	Appearances
August 11	Portsmouth, NH; Newmarket, NH; Exeter, NH	Appearances, House Party
August 13	Des Moines, IA	Meetings, Appearances
August 14	Adel, IA; Boone, IA; Fort Dodge, IA	Townhalls
August 15	Webster City, IA; Waterloo, IA; Tama, IA	Townhall, Forum, Appearance
August 16	Marshalltown, IA; Des Moines, IA	Appearance, Speech, House Parties
August 17	Newton, IA; Muscatine, IA; Eldridge, IA	Appearances
August 18	Clinton, IA; Cedar Rapids, IA	Appearance, Forum
August 19	Des Moines, IA; Indianola, IA; Urbandale, IA	Debate, Party Events, House Party
August 20	Des Moines, IA; Washington D.C	Meetings
August 28	Washington D.C	Ceremony
August 30	Iowa City, IA; Des Moines, IA; Council Bluffs, IA	Rallies
August 31	Manchester, NH	Rally

August was by far the busiest month for the Dodd campaign. It started off with the candidate criticizing the merger of Murdoch-WSJ starting a debate over media ethics. Dodd stated on August 1, "I am deeply troubled by the incredible amount of consolidation occurring across the American media landscape." On August 7 during a debate before the AFL–CIO in Chicago Dodd touted his experience in fighting for the rights of labor unions by stating, "I'm proud to say for 26 years on every major issue that labor's been involved in I've stood with you. I've stood with labor in banning outsourcing of jobs, of offset contracts, of situs picketing, on plant closing legislation." He also got into an argument with fellow Senator Barack Obama (D-IL) on Obama's recent comments about escalating the Afghanistan Conflict into Pakistan:

DODD:I think it's highly responsible—or irresponsible for people who are running for the presidency and seek that office to suggest we may be willing unilaterally to invade a nation here who we're trying to get to be more cooperative with us in Afghanistan and elsewhere.
OBAMA: Well, look, I find it amusing that those who helped to authorize and engineer the biggest foreign policy disaster in our generation are now criticizing me for making sure that we are on the right battlefield and not the wrong battlefield in the war against terrorism. (Cheers, applause.)

Dodd continued campaigning in Iowa and New Hampshire visiting up to four different cities in one day. Political commentator Bill O'Reilly slammed Dodd after he appeared on The O'Reilly Factor in August, characterizing him as a kool-aid drinker and blind follower of the far left. O'Reilly chastised Dodd and branded him a traitor for his perceived betrayal of fellow Connecticut Senator Joe Lieberman during the 2006 Senatorial election. On August 20 he attended a debate that aired on ABC and was moderated by George Stephanopoulos. He commented on the need for a president that can bring people from both parties together, "it's about getting this job done. We don't elect a king or a queen or a dictator in November, we elect a president. The margins are thin. No one political party is going to write all of this. It takes leadership that knows how to bring people together." As the month wound down for the campaign and as Dodd continued on the trail, the month of September loomed in the horizon as did an upcoming debate in Washington on the primary focus of the campaign, the Iraq War. Accompanying Dodd on the trail was the International Association of Fire Fighters, which handed him their endorsement on August 29.

=== September 2007 ===
September 2007 events

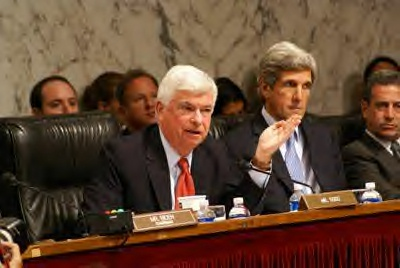
Chris Dodd questioning General David Petraeus in September 2007 during his assessment of the situation in Iraq

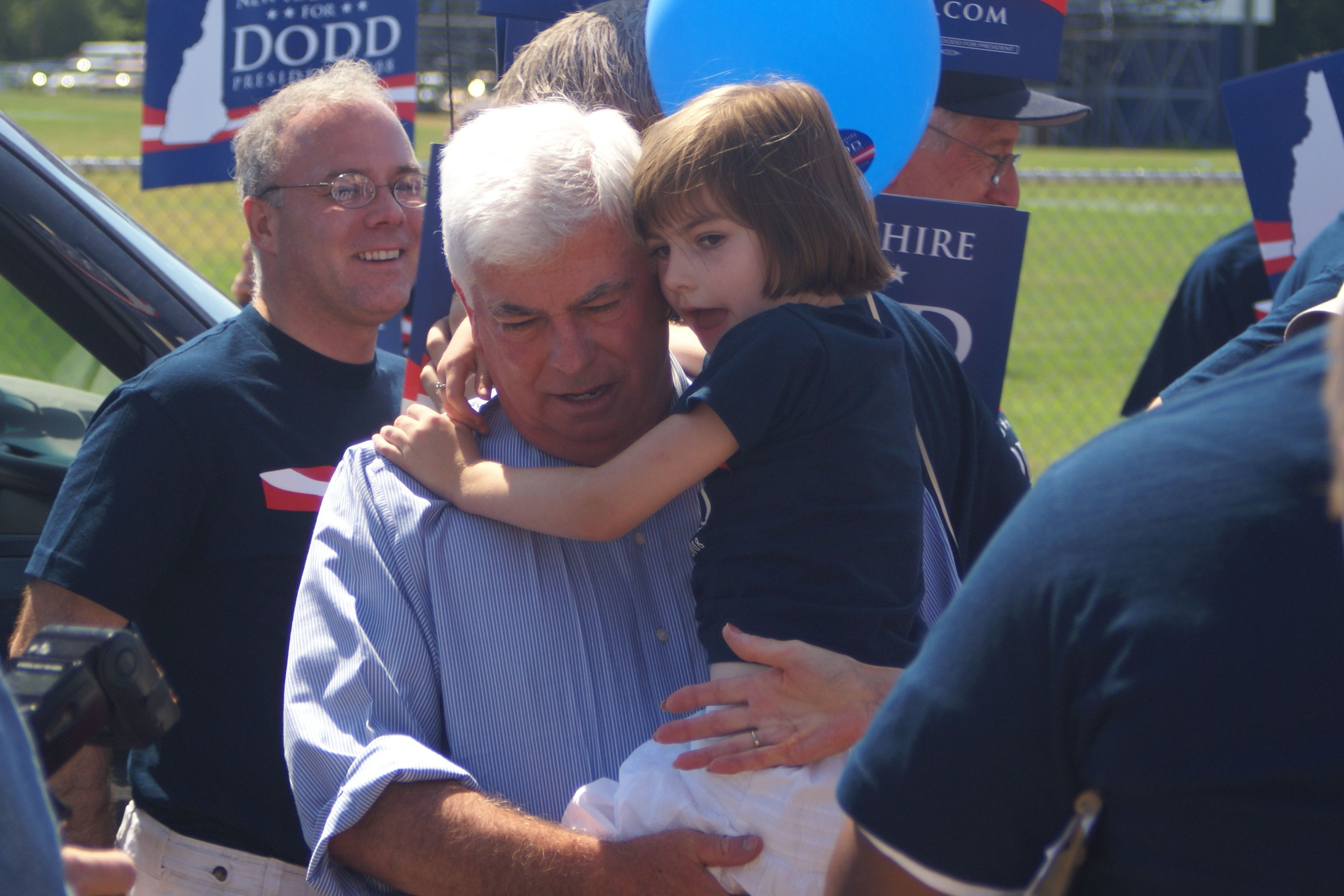
Dodd campaigns with his daughter in New Hampshire

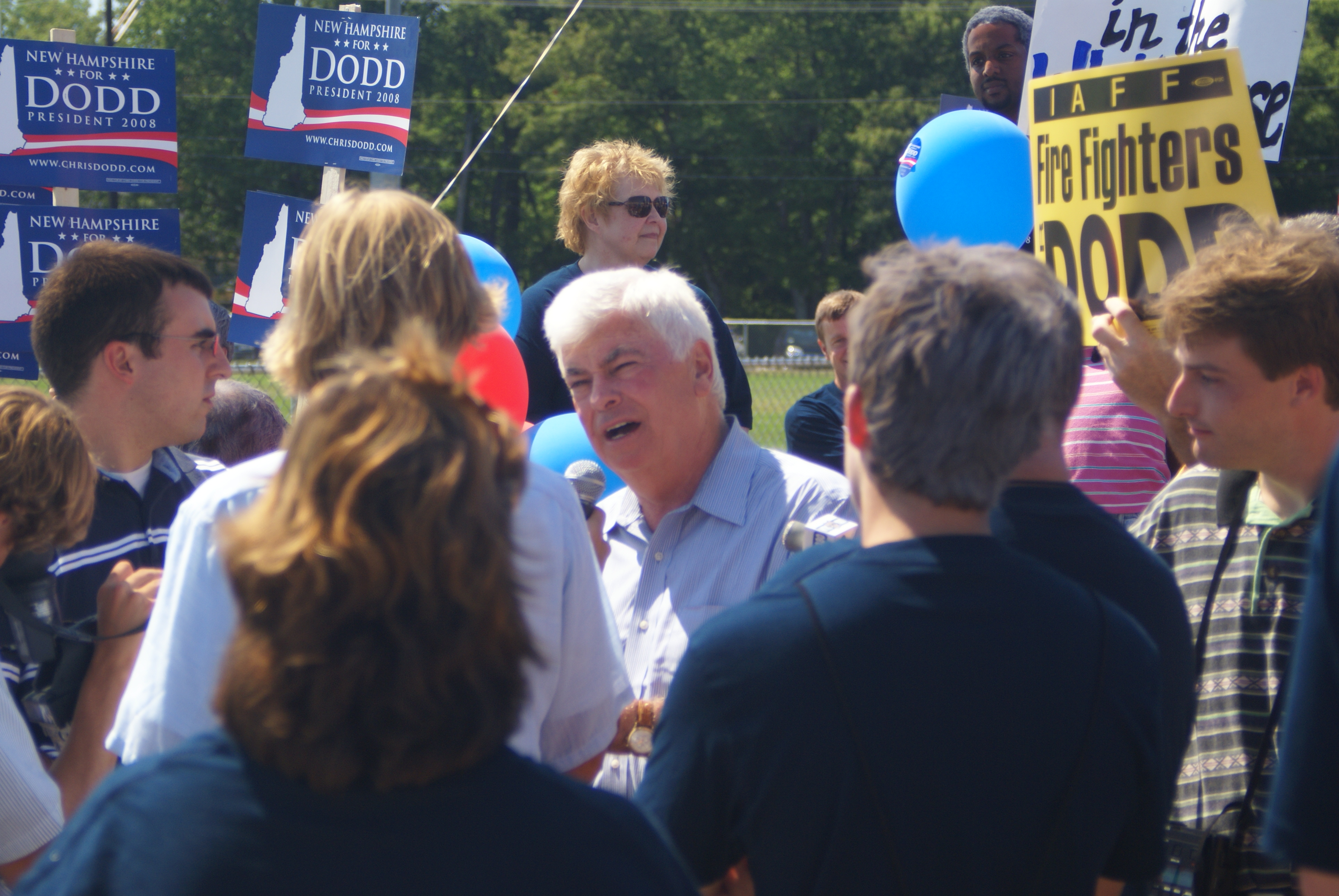
Chris Dodd campaigns in Milford, New Hampshire during Labor Day 2007

Date	Location(s)	Event(s)
September 1	Reno, NV; Las Vegas, NV	Rallies
September 2	Somersworth, NH; New London, NH	House Parties
September 3	Manchester, NH; Milford, NH; Amherst, NH	Speech, Appearance, Meetings, Party Event
September 4	Waterloo, IA; Manchester, IA	Meeting, Fundraiser
September 9	Coral Gables, FL	Debate
September 15	Ames, IA; Ankeny, IA	Party Event, Meeting
September 16	Indianola, IA	Speech, Appearance
September 17	Washington D.C	Appearance
September 20	Davenport, IA	Forum
September 21	Iowa City, IA	Appearance
September 23	Westport, CT; Stamford, CT	Fundraisers
September 26	Hartford, CT; Hanover, NH	Appearance, Debate
September 28	Mason City, IA	Meeting
September 29	Emmetsburg, IA; Storm Lake, IA; Marcus, IA; Mars, IA	Meetings
September 30	Sioux City, IA	Townhall

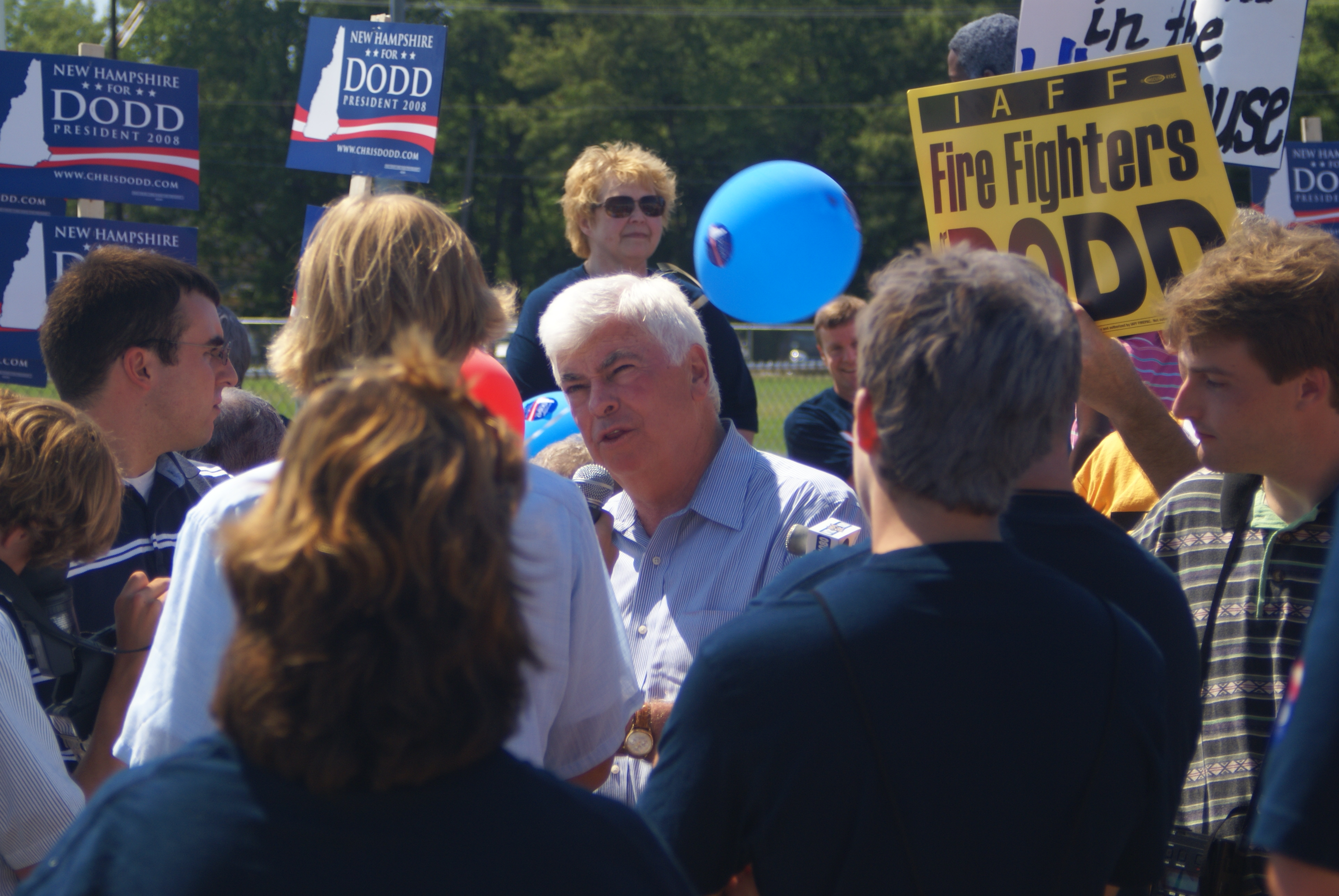
Dodd campaigning in New Hampshire

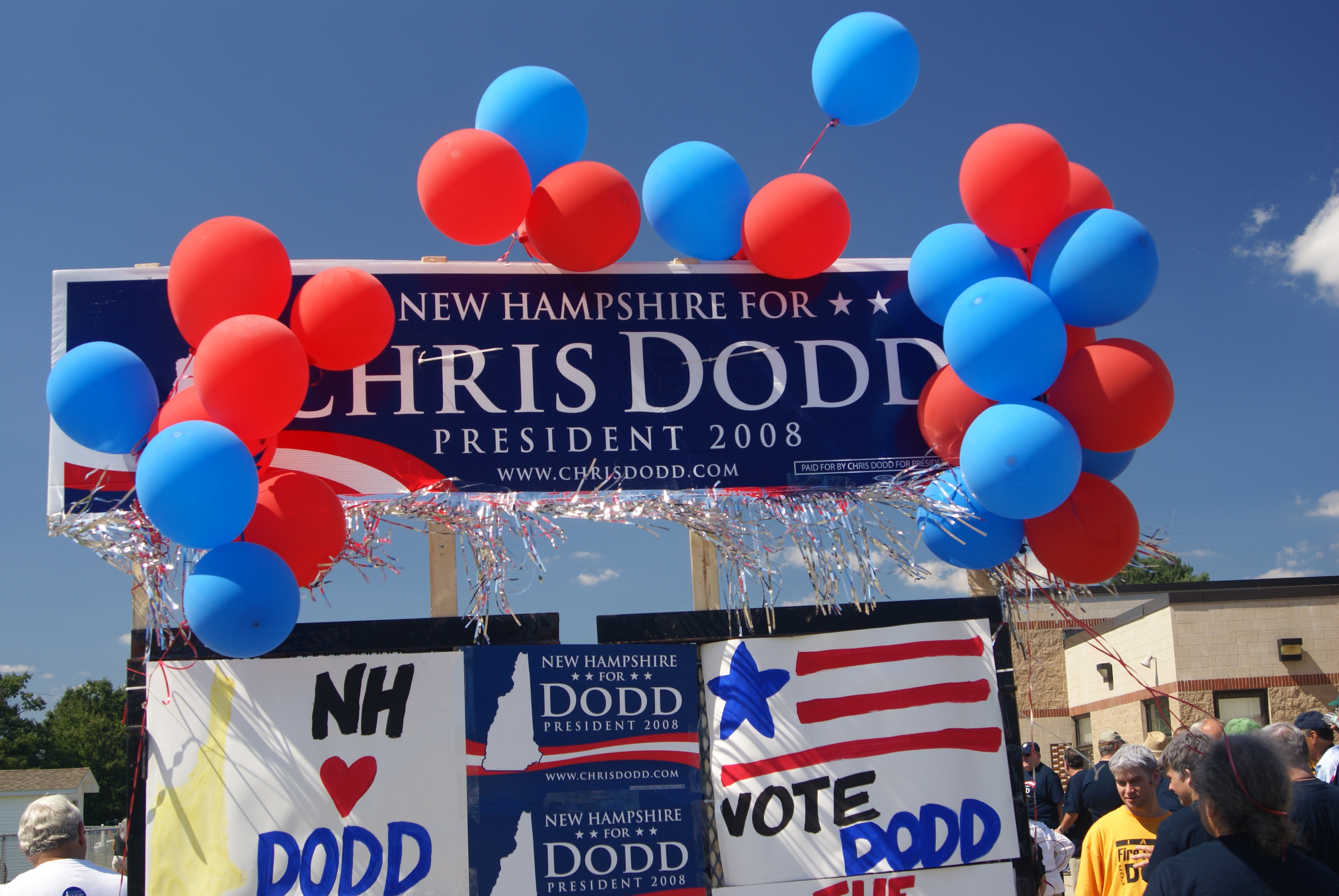
Float supporting Dodd's campaign in New Hampshire

As Dodd began the September campaign in Nevada and New Hampshire the stage was being set in Florida for a debate on Hispanic issues. However this would later be overshadowed by events that would occur in Washington on September 11. During the testimony of General David Petraeus, he lashed out against the surge policy stating:

In the eight months since President Bush’s announced the surge, we have spent tens of billions of dollars, over 700 American service men and women have sacrificed their lives, and nearly 4,400 have been wounded—all to provide breathing space for the Iraqi Government to engage in political reconciliation. And what has the Iraqi Government done with this breathing space?

— Chris Dodd

At the same time the website MoveOn.org released an ad that slammed General Petraeus, calling him a traitor. Dodd voted against a Congressional act to denounce the ad on September 21.

Returning to the campaign trail, Dodd made stops in Iowa where he started what would be a later October trend by attacking the frontrunner Hillary Clinton. He attacked her record on health care stating, "It should be far more than just a parable of personal growth and maturation. This was about an issue that was critically important to the country. It was a major effort that failed. There were a lot of reasons that it failed, not the least of which it was mismanaged terribly at the time." In addition to the campaigning in Iowa, attended fundraisers in his home state of Connecticut, visited New Hampshire and returned to Iowa all in the timespan of 10 days. At the end of September as the third quarter came to a close, the campaign revealed that it had raised only $1,467,093, spent $4,025,458, leaving $3,874,874 cash on hand.

=== October 2007 ===
October 2007 events

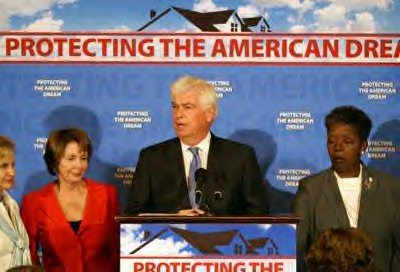
Dodd delivering a campaign speech in October 2007

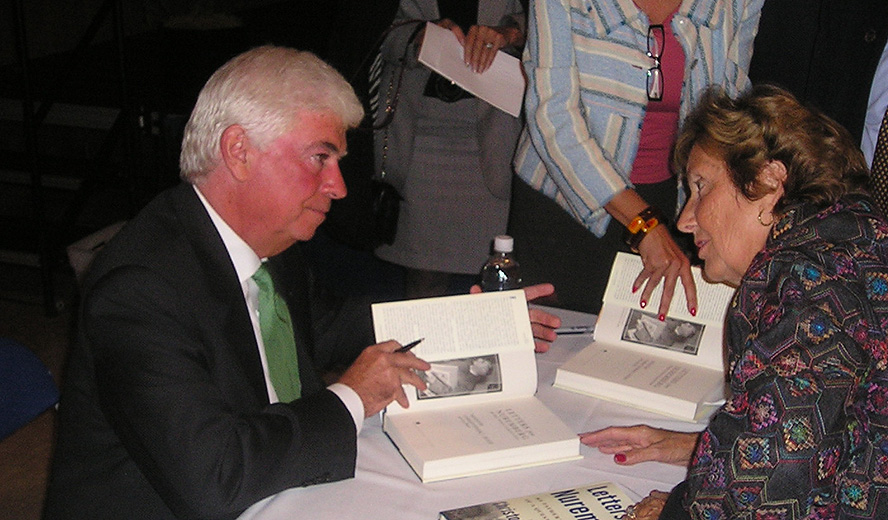
Dodd at a book signing for Letters from Nuremberg: My Father's Narrative of a Quest for Justice

Date	Location	Event
October 6	Des Moines, IA; Grinnell, IA; Iowa City, IA; Williamsburg, IA	Meeting, Appearances, Party Event
October 7	Delta, IA; Washington, IA; Wapello, IA; Burlington, IA	Meetings, Appearance
October 8	Mount Pleasant, IA; Ottumwa, IA; Fairfield, IA; Fort Madison, IA	Meetings, Appearance, Forums
October 9	Des Moines, IA	Speech, Forum, House Party
October 12	Iowa City, IA; Cedar Rapids, IA; Vinton, IA; Waterloo, IA	Appearances, Forums
October 13	Independence, IA; Dubuque, IA	Forum, Fundraiser
October 19	Concord, NH; Nashua, NH	Appearances, Speech
October 20	Manchester, NH	Meetings, Appearances
October 21	Waverly, IA	Forum
October 23	Mason City, IA; Iowa Falls, IA; Fort Dodge, IA; Des Moines, IA	Appearance, meetings
October 24	Council Bluffs, IA	House Party
October 25	Missouri Valley, IA; Denison, IA; Carroll, IA	Meetings
October 30	Philadelphia, PA	Debate

In October the Dodd campaign focused its attention on Iowa, abandoning most of the campaigning in New Hampshire. On the trail, the campaign received little media attention despite a surge in appearances. As the month neared its final days an unexpected apex emerged for the campaign. During an October 30 MSNBC debate, he went after the frontrunner Hillary Clinton, slamming her for her support of Governor of New York Eliot Spitzer's plan to give driver's licenses to illegal immigrants:

SEN. CLINTON: I just want to add, I did not say that it should be done, but I certainly recognize why Governor Spitzer is trying to do it. And we have failed --
SEN. DODD: Wait a minute. No, no, no. You said yes, you thought it made sense to do it.
SEN. CLINTON: No, I didn't, Chris. But the point is, what are we going to do with all these illegal immigrants who are (driving ?) -- (inaudible)?
SEN. DODD: Well, that's a legitimate issue. But driver's license goes too far, in my view.
SEN. CLINTON: Well, you may say that, but what is the identification if somebody runs into you today who is an undocumented worker --
SEN. DODD: There's ways of dealing with that.
SEN. CLINTON: Well, but --
SEN. DODD: This is a privilege, not a right.
SEN. CLINTON: Well, what Governor Spitzer has agreed to do is to have three different licenses; one that provides identification for actually going onto airplanes and other kinds of security issues, another which is an ordinary driver's license, and then a special card that identifies the people who would be on the road.
SEN. DODD: That's a bureaucratic nightmare.

Later in the debate Dodd articulated his support for the decriminalization of marijuana citing the high populations of American prisons. Many of the participants expressed their disagreement with him on this issue. The debate was the last campaign stop for Dodd in October who went into November with energy and momentum from the multiple exchanges.

=== November 2007 ===
November 2007 events

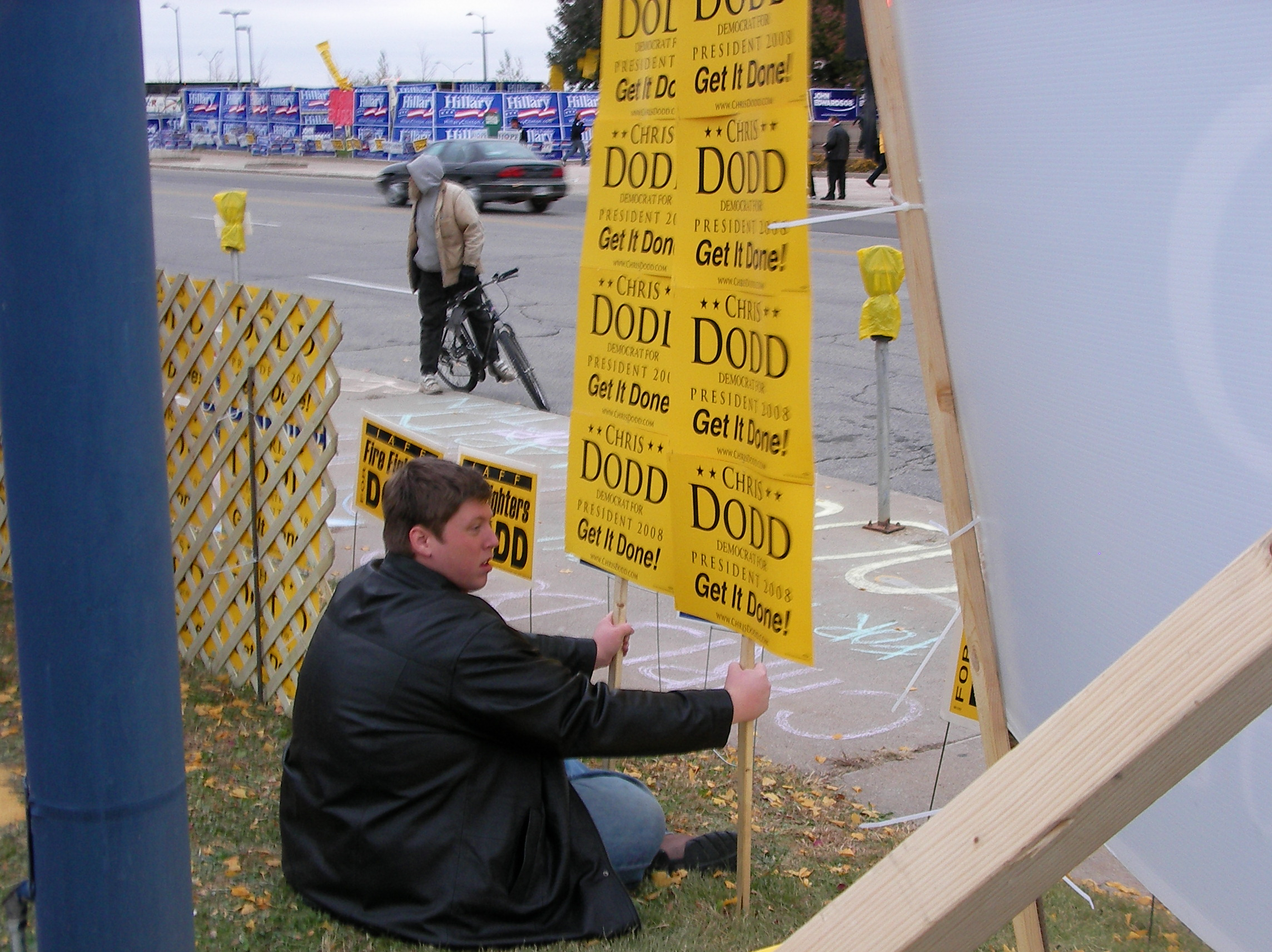
Dodd supporter outside Vets Auditorium in Iowa

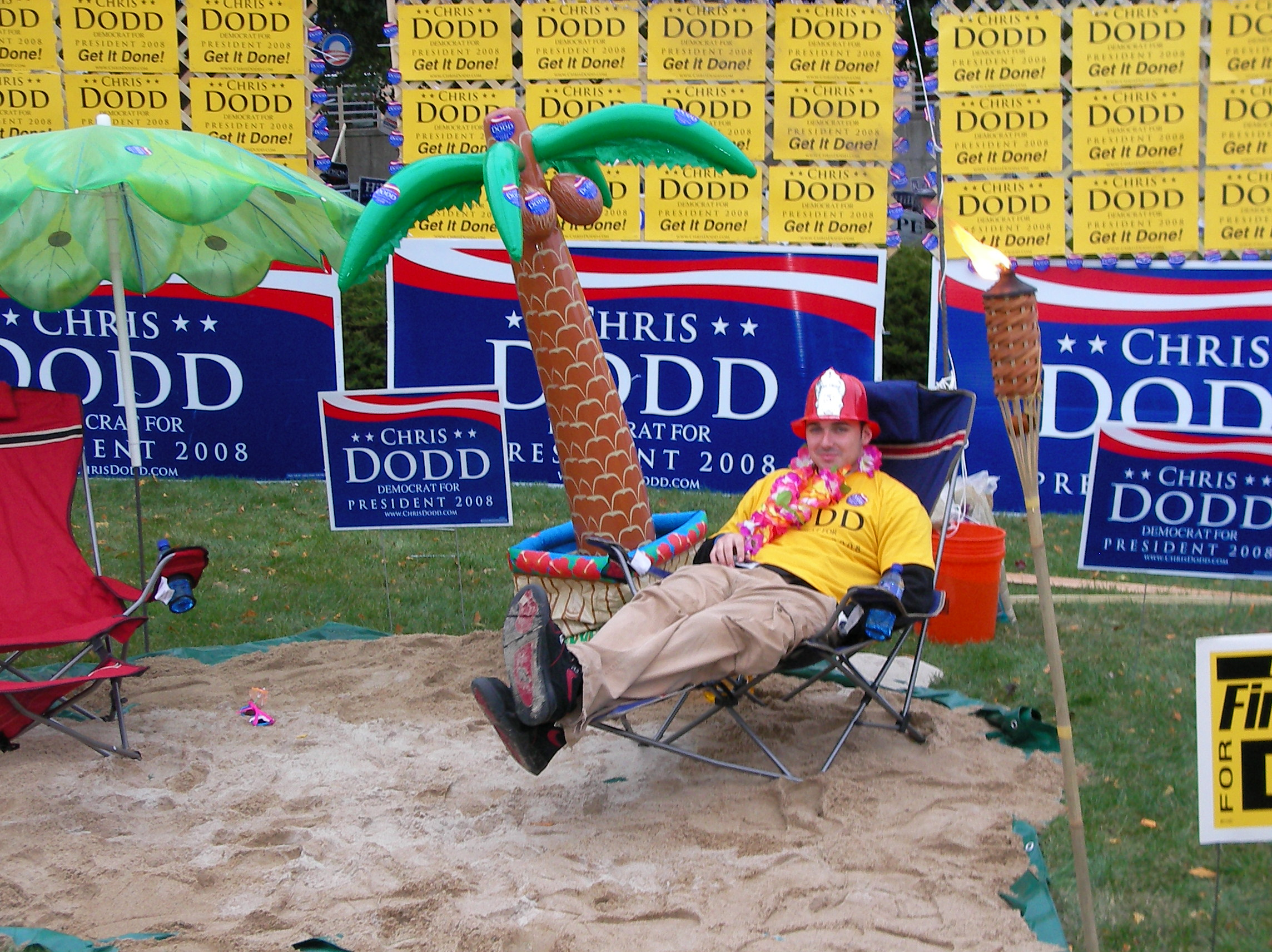
Dodd supporter at the Jefferson-Jackson dinner in November 2007

Date	Location(s)	Event(s)
November 2	Manchester, NH; Durham, NH	Speeches, Appearance
November 3	Windham, NH; Concord, NH; Keene, NH	Party Events, Speech
November 5	Ames, IA	Forum
November 6	Iowa City, IA	Meetings
November 7	Knoxville, IA; Burlington, IA; Bettendorf, IA	Meetings
November 8	Coralville, IA	Meeting
November 9	Mason City, IA; Oelwein, IA	House Party, Party Event
November 10	Des Moines, IA	Party Event, Forum
November 11	Emmetsburg, IA	Appearance
November 13	Dubuque, IA	Meeting
November 15	Las Vegas, NV	Debate
November 17	Waverly, IA; Marshalltown, IA; Oelwein, IA; Decorah, IA	Town Hall, House Parties
November 18	West Des Moines, IA; Waterloo, IA	House Parties
November 19	Des Moines, IA	Forum
November 26	Davenport, IA	Meeting
November 27	Ames, IA	Speech, Appearance

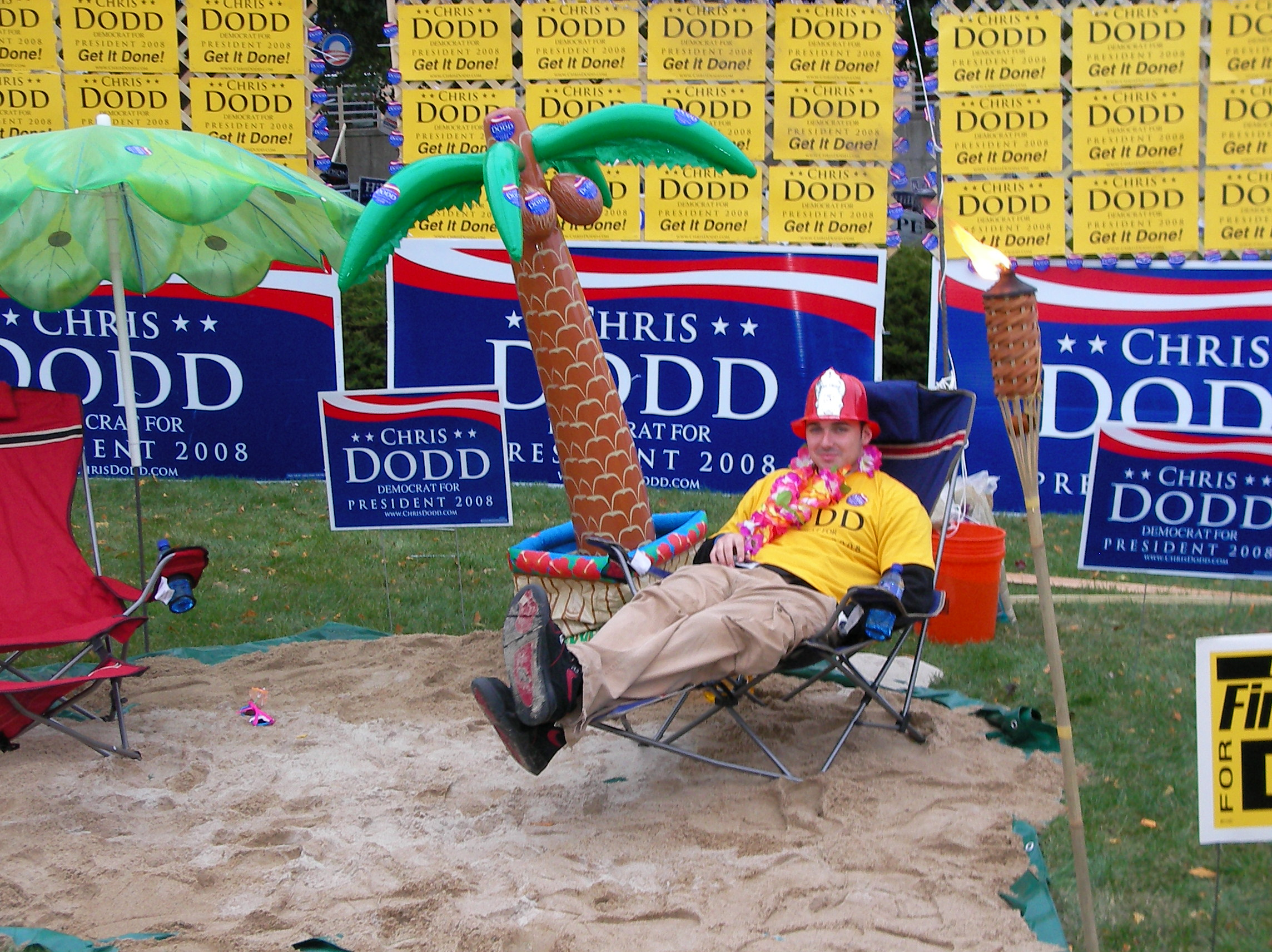
Dodd supporter in Iowa

In November he started off with two-day events in New Hampshire and then devoted the rest of the month to Iowa. He talked about the need for the United States to redeploy troops out of Iraq, pay attention to global warming and health care, strengthen American ties with their allies including Pakistan and to not start a war with Iran further criticizing Clinton's yes vote on a resolution designating the Iranian Revolutionary Guard Corps as a terrorist organization. During a November 15 debate in Las Vegas he spoke out in favor of free trade and attacked his fellow candidates:

Well, first of all, look: I respect the fact that we're calling for timeouts, but as was pointed out earlier by John Edwards, we've had Senator Obama and Senator Clinton both came out in support of the Peruvian free trade agreement -- now switching our positions on these issues here for the convenience of a debate and discussion on where polling data may be. We are in a global economy. It is critically important that we do everything we can to expand those markets so that our products and our services can be sold in foreign nations here. It was outrageous in a sense here -- had a U.S. corporation produced contaminated toys or food, they would have been shut down in 20 minutes

— Chris Dodd

While on the trail in Iowa on November 20 Dodd criticized fellow candidates who threatened to cut off funding to Pakistan in light of President Pervez Musharraf's suspension of the constitution. He stated "I think it's a very dangerous thing to suggest at this point. We could find ourselves cut off. ... We could not get into Afghanistan except through Pakistan. So in addition to the issue of nuclear weapons, and who controls them, and a state hostile to our interest, you have to be careful how much you threaten."

=== December 2007 ===
December 2007 events

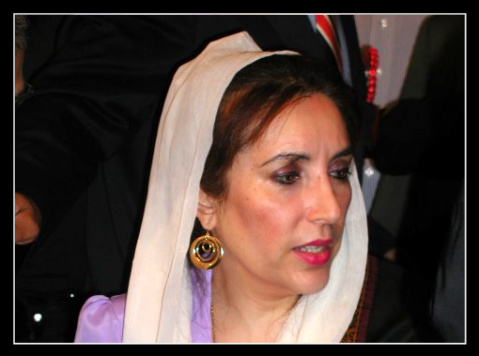
The assassination of Benazir Bhutto became an election issue as Dodd and other candidates explained how to deal with the situation while on the campaign trail

Date	Location(s)	Event(s)
December 1	Des Moines, IA	Forums, Appearance
December 2	Indianola, IA	House Party
December 3	Des Moines, IA	Town Hall
December 4	Des Moines, IA; Sioux City, IA	Debate, Town Hall
December 5	Pella, IA; Oskaloosa, IA	Town Halls
December 7	Iowa City, IA	Town Hall
December 10	Mountain View, CA	Speech
December 12	Vinton, IA; Mason City, IA	Town Halls
December 13	Johnston, IA; Story City, IA	Debate, Fundraiser
December 16	Bellevue, IA; Cascade, IA	Town Halls
December 26	Iowa Falls, IA	Appearance
December 27	Des Moines, IA	Appearance
December 28	Council Bluffs, IA; Des Moines, IA	Party Events
December 29	Sioux City, IA; Carroll, IA; Emmetsburg, IA; Denison, IA; Logan, IA; Hartford, CT	Party Events, Rally, Appearances
December 30	Le Mars, IA; Mason City, IA	Party Events
December 31	Dubuque, IA; Waterloo, IA; Waverly, IA; Oelwein, IA	Party Events

Dodd spent most of December in Iowa engaged in Town Halls. He briefly made a trip to Mountain View, California to make a speech before returning to the trails in Iowa. He participated in the last Democratic Debate before the primary season on December 13 in Johnson, Iowa. In this debate sponsored by the Des Moines Register, Dodd commented that Education was the most important issue to him in the campaign. He also made a statement on why he felt he was the best choice for president and why he should receive the endorsement of the Des Moines Register, which ultimately went to Hillary Clinton.

Thank you. Let me begin by thanking Iowans. We've been warmly and graciously received, and we're grateful to the state for all of that. One of the things I’ve tried to do is talk about positive ideas and results here. I think Iowa ns, like other Americans, want to know not only what you're going to do, but also give us some sense that you've got a record that you believe in ideas that brings people together. It's what I’ve done for 26 years, working to bring Democrats and Republicans together. I’m a former Peace Corps volunteer, I’m the only candidate to have done that public service, and we believe very strong strongly that that kind of background and history contributes well to the decisions a president must make. We ask for your vote. It's about choosing the best candidate who can win and who can lead our country.

— Chris Dodd

Following the assassination of former Pakistani Prime Minister Benazir Bhutto, Dodd released a statement while campaigning that elaborated on his experiences with the slain leader. He commented that the event was an important time in both Pakistan and the United States that will impact the future of both nation's security. He described the significance of America's responsibility to keep democracy in the nation and the region as a whole. Following the statement Dodd completed the year's campaigning by attending New Year's Eve parties in cities in the first caucus state of Iowa.

=== January 2008 ===
January 2008 events

Date	Location(s)	Event(s)
January 3	Iowa City, IA; Cedar Rapids, IA	Party Event, Appearance

Dodd participated in the Iowa Caucus on January 3, 2008. After receiving a disappointing total of 0% of the vote he ended his campaign. In his final words on the trail, He reflected on the joy he had in running for president.

Tonight I am withdrawing from the Presidential race. But let me assure you, we do not exit this race with our heads hanging - rather, we do so with our heads held high... I think we all knew from the very beginning that ... this would be an uphill battle...only when you try can you truly make a difference in this world, and I'm truly glad I tried.

— Chris Dodd

== Fundraising ==
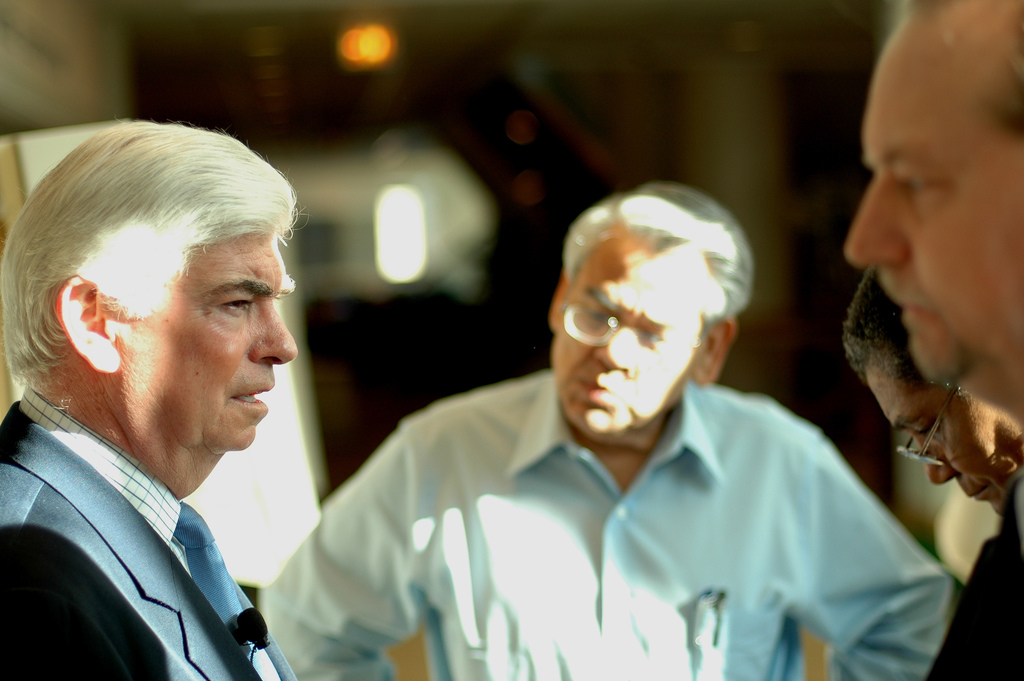
Chris Dodd speaking at an SEIU event in January 2007

The Dodd campaign had raised $13,598,152 overall, spent $9,723,278 leaving $3,874,874 cash on hand. Alec Baldwin donated $2,100 during a New York fundraiser. John Lithgow and Barbra Streisand each added $1,000 and Steve Martin and Howard Stringer each gave $2,300. Jeffrey Bewkes, Lorne Michaels, Paul Simon and his wife each donated the most at $4,600 followed closely behind by Ronald Meyer who donated $4,400. Elisabeth Shue donated $1,500 and Christy Carlson Romano added $300. On October 26, the New London's The Day reported that through September Dodd's campaign received $21,600 from employees of Connecticut's Foxwoods Casino and an additional $2,300 from the Mashantucket Pequot's political action committee. According to the financial records, 60% of Dodd's donations came from individual contributors. 4% of donations came from PACs, which overwhelming were related to groups with business agendas. The following chart shows the amount raised in the top three states by Dodd and in the states he had been campaigning in the most, Iowa and New Hampshire:

State	Funds Raised
New York	$2,062,410
Connecticut	$2,046,017
California	$563,395
Iowa	$10,150
New Hampshire	$26,300

== Polling ==
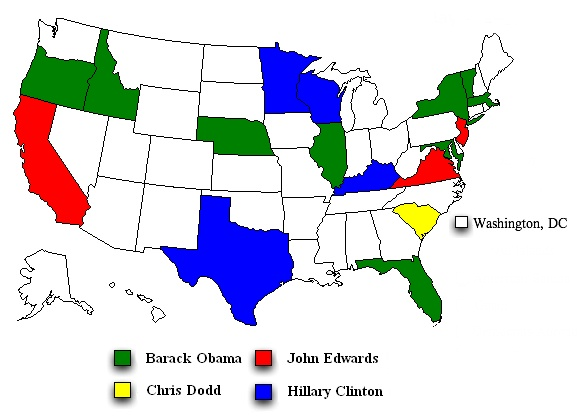
The straw poll victory in South Carolina landed Dodd the state in Democratic Straw Polls

In polling, Dodd was unable to break through to the top tier. In Nationwide polls almost always polled at or around 1%. A November 7, 2007, Gallup poll placed him in last place, behind both Joe Biden and Dennis Kucinich, as well as the three front runners. At the state level, Dodd has also not done so well. In a November 18, 2007, Iowa poll conducted by ABC news, he registered with 1% the same number from a similar poll done by ABC news on July 31, 2007. In New Hampshire, a poll conducted by CNN placed Dodd at 1% constant from a September poll but up from polls in June and July. However, on the straw poll level, Dodd was able to gain a victory during an event in South Carolina on March 5, 2007. He won the York County straw poll by receiving 28% of the 100 votes cast. Barack Obama came in second with 24%. Hillary Clinton got 18% and John Edwards received 11%. The victory came two days after Dodd visited the county which probably secured him the win.

A November 2007 poll of Connecticut voters conducted by the Quinnipiac University Polling Institute determined that Dodd was losing in the state to Hillary Clinton. Of the 1,029 voters surveyed, 70% wanted Dodd to drop out of the presidential race, and 55% said he was spending too much time on the campaign trail. In response, Dodd's national press secretary, Colleen Flanagan, said "Connecticut voters are being asked to look at Senator Dodd in a different light than in past years" adding that once voters become more focused on the presidential race, they will look to Dodd as "a candidate who has a track record of proven results."

=== Head to head ===
Head to Head matchups

January 15–16, 2007 Rasmussen Reports

Chris Dodd	Rudy Giuliani
39%	44%

January 15–16, 2007 Rasmussen Reports

Chris Dodd	John McCain
33%	52%

== Endorsements ==
List of People endorsing Chris Dodd

Dodd's endorsers include:

- Rep. Xavier Becerra (D-Calif.)
- Rep. Joe Courtney (D-CT)
- Rep. Rosa DeLauro (D-CT)
- Rep. Anna Eshoo (D-CA)
- Rep. Sam Farr (D-CA)
- Rep. Patrick J. Kennedy (D-RI)
- Rep. John Larson (D-CT)
- Rep. Chris Murphy (D-CT)
- Rep. Tim Ryan (D-OH)
- Rep. Linda Sanchez (D-CA)
- Edward M. Kennedy Jr.
- Eunice Shriver, sister of Robert, Ted and John F. Kennedy
- Timothy Shriver, Chairman of Special Olympics and son of Eunice Kennedy Shriver and Sargent Shriver
- Politician Ned Lamont
- Time Warner president Jeffrey Bewkes
- CEO of Universal Studios Ronald Meyer
- Actress/Singer Christy Carlson Romano
- Singer Paul Simon
- Actress/Singer Barbra Streisand
- Sony CEO Howard Stringer

=== Kennedy family ===
Dodd had received endorsements from members of the Kennedy family including Rhode Island Representative Patrick J. Kennedy and his brother Edward M. Kennedy Jr. Eunice Kennedy Shriver had also campaigned for him. On November 1, the campaign announced he had been endorsed by Bobby Shriver, co-founder of Debt AIDS Trade in Africa. Dodd had asked Senator Ted Kennedy repeatedly for an endorsement. On November 20, 2007, Timothy Shriver, the Chairman of Special Olympics announced his endorsement for Dodd.

=== Firefighters ===
On August 28, Dodd received the endorsement of the International Association of Fire Fighters. On October 24, in a speech before an International Association of Fire Fighters conference, he criticized the Bush Administration's failure to fully fund first responders battling the massive wildfires in Southern California.

=== Campaign advisors ===
Dodd's campaign advisors included:

- Sheryl Cohen, campaign manager and Dodd's Chief of Staff in the Senate
- Jim Jordan, senior adviser who served as the campaign manager for John Kerry in his 2004 presidential run
- Matt Butler, deputy campaign manager who served the same post during John Kerry's 2004 run
- Vince Frillici, finance director. Veteran fundraiser who served as the national finance director for the senator's re-election in 2004.
- Scott Arceneaux, political director and former director of the Louisiana State Democratic Party
- Amos Hochstein, policy director
- Stan Greenberg, pollster
- Doug Sosnik, adviser and former NBA executive
