= Sifakis =

Sifakis (Greek: Σηφάκης) is a Greek surname. Notable people with the surname include:

- George Sifakis, American government official
- Joseph Sifakis (born 1946), Greek-French computer scientist
- Myron Sifakis (born 1960), Greek football goalkeeper
- Michalis Sifakis (born 1984), Greek football goalkeeper
