= Lezlee Westine =

American political advisor and attorney

Director of the Office of Public Liaison
- In office January 20, 2001 – May 25, 2005
- President: George W. Bush
- Preceded by: Mary Beth Cahill
- Succeeded by: Rhonda Keenum

Personal details
- Born: August 28, 1960 (age 66) Hinsdale, Illinois, U.S.
- Party: Republican
- Education: University of Florida (BA); University of California, Los Angeles (MBA); Georgetown University (JD)

Lezlee Jean Westine (born August 28, 1960) is an American political advisor and attorney serving as the president and chief executive of Personal Care Products Council and a former Republican operative who worked for President George W. Bush.

== Career ==
Westine began her career practicing political and election law in California for Nielsen, Merksamer, Parrinello, Mueller & Naylor. She then ran the northern California office of Governor Pete Wilson. Westine helped found Technet, a political network of high-level executives to promotes the growth of technology sector.

In 2001 she was selected to serve as White House Director of the Office of Public Liaison.

As an executive for PCPC, Westine's salary for 2012 was $920,592.00,

== Personal life ==
Westine is the single mother of one daughter.

Political offices
Preceded by Mary Beth Cahill	Director of the Office of Public Liaison; 2001–2005	Succeeded by Rhonda Keenum
