= Minyon Moore =

American presidential advisor

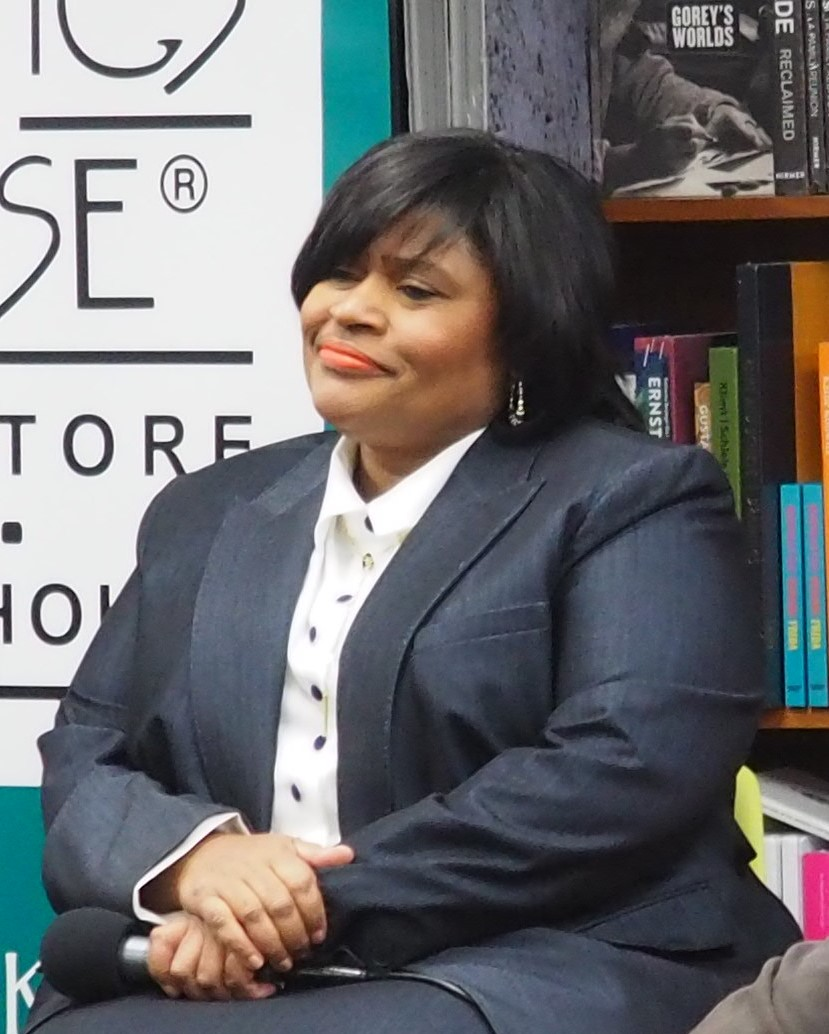
- Moore at an event in 2019

White House Director of Political Affairs
- In office February 5, 1999 – January 20, 2001
- President: Bill Clinton
- Preceded by: Craig T. Smith
- Succeeded by: Ken Mehlman

Director of the Office of Public Liaison
- In office June 29, 1998 – February 5, 1999
- President: Bill Clinton
- Preceded by: Maria Echaveste
- Succeeded by: Mary Beth Cahill

Personal details
- Born: May 16, 1958 (age 68) Chicago, Illinois, U.S.
- Party: Democratic
- Education: University of Illinois, Chicago (BA)

Minyon Moore (born May 16, 1958) is an American political activist and civil servant. Moore is the founder of Women Building for the Future, and heads Dewey Square Group's state and local practice. She is chairperson of the 2024 Democratic National Convention, held in Chicago, Illinois. She was formerly chief executive officer and before that chief operating officer of the Democratic National Committee, and before that, assistant to the President of the United States, director of the White House Office of Public Liaison, and director of White House political affairs under President Bill Clinton.

Previously, Moore worked as an advisor to the presidential campaigns of Rev. Jesse Jackson in 1984 and 1988. She also served as Governor Michael Dukakis' national deputy field director.

Moore was a senior political consultant to Hillary Clinton's 2008 presidential campaign, and was considered a member of her inner circle, "Hillaryland". Moore was called a "trusted voice" in Clinton's circle when she began her 2016 campaign for president.

Moore is on the Democratic National Committee's executive committee. On February 21, 2015, they unanimously voted to adopt a resolution calling for "Right to Vote" Amendment to the U.S. Constitution to explicitly guarantee an citizen's right to vote. She is also on the Black Lives Matter Global Network Foundation's board of directors.

== Life ==
Moore was born in Chicago, Illinois. She graduated from Boston University's Film School with a certificate in digital film-making and sits on the board of the Writers’ Guild Foundation with leaders in the film and television industry such as Shonda Rhimes, Matthew Weiner, and Sally Wilcox.

Together with Donna Brazile, Leah Daughtry, Tina Flournoy and Yolanda Caraway, Moore is a member of the informal group the "Colored Girls," described by political columnist Matt Bai as "several African-American women who had reached the highest echelons of Democratic politics." Governor Howard Dean, former chair of the DNC, who had one of his dinners with the Colored Girls on the night of the 2014 midterm elections, said their perspective was important. "They're very rare Washington insiders who understand the rest of the country," Mr. Dean said. "That's part of what makes them so valuable. These women have not lost their connections with where they came from." In 2018, Moore, Brazile, Daughtry, and Caraway published For Colored Girls Who Have Considered Politics, a joint memoir and history of their time in politics.

On September 5, 2020, Moore was announced as a member of the advisory council of the Biden-Harris Transition Team, which planned the presidential transition of Joe Biden.

== Awards ==
Moore was named as a Most Influential Leader by Rainbow Push in December, 2014.

In 2001, Washingtonian magazine named her as one of the 100 Most Powerful Women in Washington.

Winner of the Tin Cup award by Washington Government Relations Group for her "proven commitment to the enrichment of African American government relations professionals".

Honored with the Spirit of Democracy Award from the National Coalition on Black Civic Participation, award given to leaders who are unselfishly dedicated to education, social and economic justice.

Winner of the Uncommon Height Award: Each year an Uncommon Height Award is presented to one or more individuals who have achieved uncommon heights in excellence of service to others. Awardees are recognized for their ability to exceed far above and beyond oneself in the same spirit and tradition of Dr. Dorothy Height.

Political offices
Preceded by Maria Echaveste	Director of the Office of Public Liaison; 1998–1999	Succeeded by Mary Beth Cahill
Preceded by Craig T. Smith	White House Director of Political Affairs; 1999–2001	Succeeded by Ken Mehlman
Party political offices
Preceded by Bennie Thompson	Permanent Chair of the Democratic National Convention; 2024	Most recent
