= Mary Beth Cahill =

American political figure

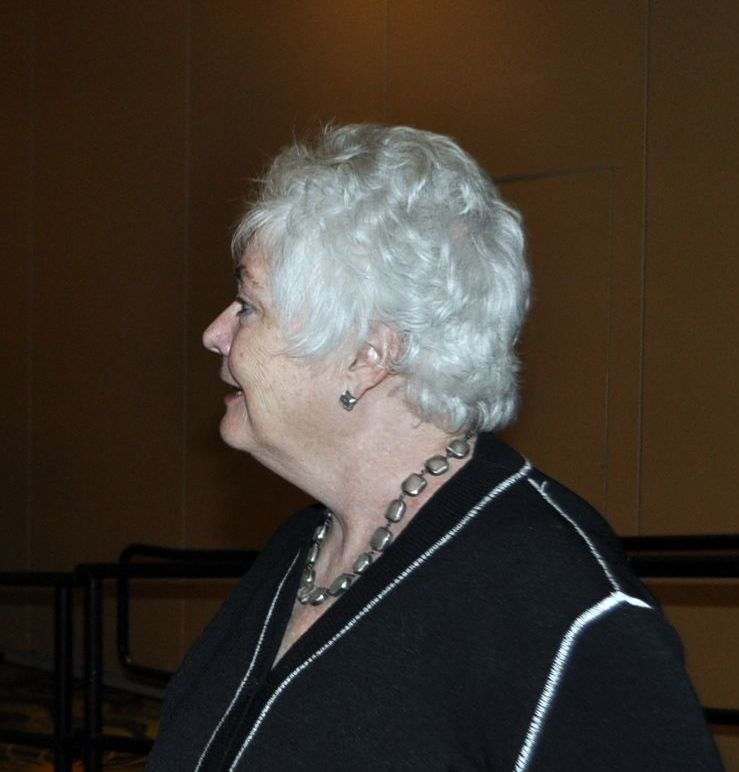

Director of the Office of Public Liaison
- In office February 5, 1999 – January 20, 2001
- President: Bill Clinton
- Preceded by: Minyon Moore
- Succeeded by: Lezlee Westine

Personal details
- Born: December 1954 (age 71) Dorchester, Massachusetts, U.S.
- Party: Democratic
- Education: Emmanuel College (BA)

Mary Beth Cahill (born December 1954) is an American political advisor who served as the campaign manager of the John Kerry 2004 presidential campaign. She was Kerry's second campaign manager, replacing Jim Jordan in November 2003, after Jordan was fired by Kerry. In February 2018, Cahill was named interim CEO of the Democratic National Committee.

== Early life and education ==
Cahill was born in Dorchester, Massachusetts and raised in Framingham, Massachusetts by a large, politically active, Irish-Catholic family. Cahill graduated from Emmanuel College, Boston, a small local Catholic liberal arts school with a Bachelor of Arts degree in English and political science in 1976.

== Career ==
Cahill started her political career by working as a receptionist and caseworker for Congressman Robert Drinan, a Jesuit priest, after which she became Chief of Staff for Representative Barney Frank. In 1986, she was the campaign manager for Senator Patrick Leahy (D-VT). She was also an Assistant to the President and Director of Public Liaison in Bill Clinton's White House and chief of staff to Senator Ted Kennedy (D-MA).

Following the Kerry campaign, Cahill was a fellow at the Harvard Institute of Politics at Harvard University's John F. Kennedy School of Government in the spring of 2005. She led a study group for undergraduates entitled "Campaigns 101." She also co-founded The Atlas Project, a political consulting firm that worked primarily with Democrats, labor unions, and liberal activist organizations.

Cahill last worked to raise funds for Massachusetts Democratic gubernatorial candidate Deval Patrick, who defeated Attorney General Tom Reilly and businessman Chris Gabrieli in the 2006 primary and Kerry Healey in the general election.

Cahill was the Executive Director of EMILY's List for five years and has trained women on how to run for political office in countries including Russia, North Macedonia, and Ireland.

In March 2024, Cahill was announced as co-leader of a new team within the Democratic National Committee to combat third-party and independent challengers in the 2024 United States presidential election.

Political offices
Preceded by Minyon Moore	Director of the Office of Public Liaison; 1999–2001	Succeeded by Lezlee Westine
