= White House Office of Public Liaison =

Unit of the U.S. White House Office

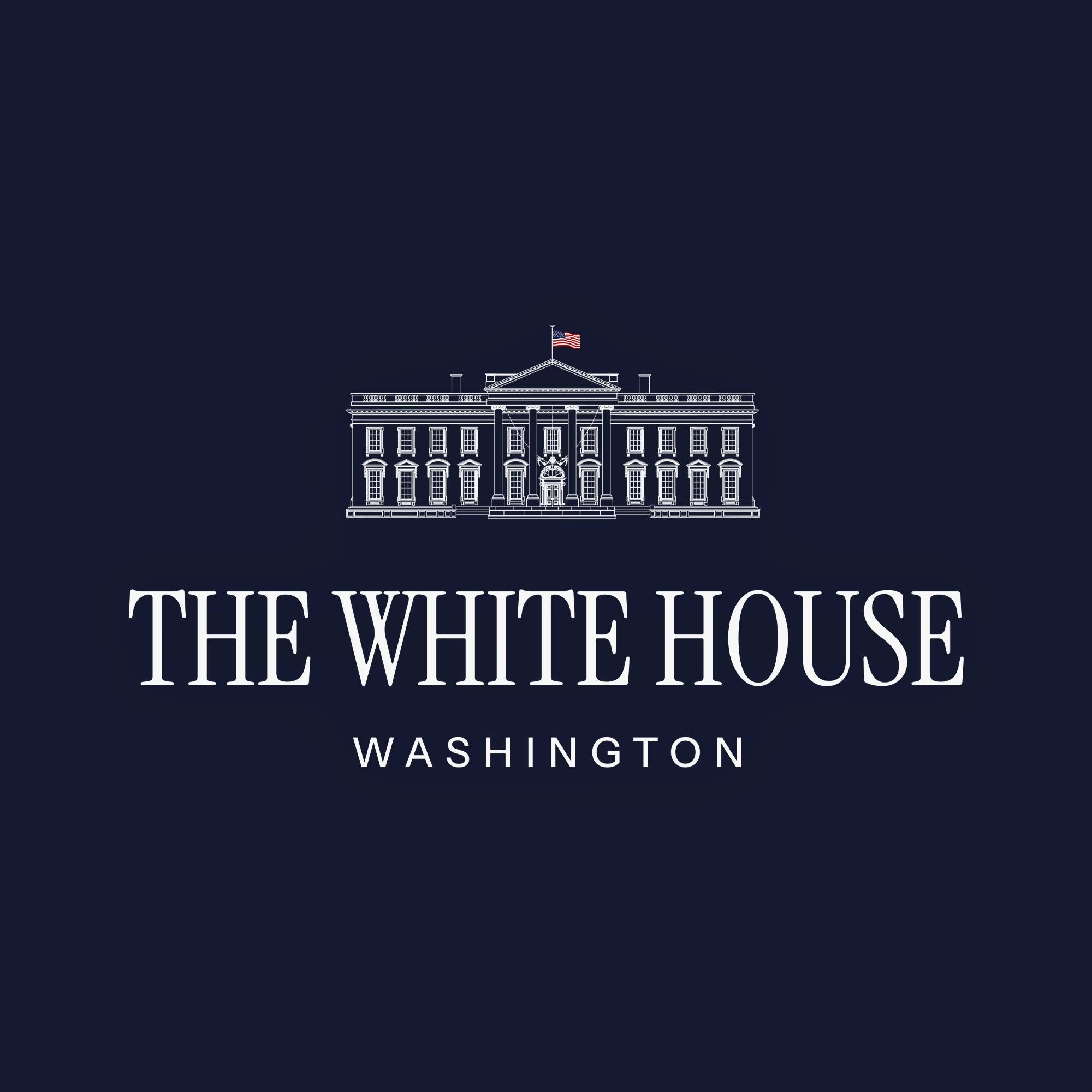

Agency overview
- Formed: 1974; 52 years ago
- Headquarters: Eisenhower Executive Office Building Washington, D.C., U.S.; 38°53′51.24″N 77°2′20.93″W
- Agency executive: Jim Goyer, Director
- Parent department: White House Office

The White House Office of Public Liaison (OPL) is a unit of the White House Office within the Executive Office of the President of the United States. Under President Barack Obama, it was renamed to the Office of Public Engagement and Intergovernmental Affairs (OPE-IGA). President Donald Trump restored the prior name of the Office of Public Liaison (OPL) and re-separated the Office of Intergovernmental Affairs. President Joe Biden changed the name to Office of Public Engagement (OPE) with a separate IGA office, which was once again reverted in Trump's second term.

The Office is responsible for communicating with various interest groups and overseeing their relationships with the White House.

== History ==
Under President Richard Nixon, Charles Colson performed public liaison work. President Gerald Ford first formalized the public liaison office after he took office in 1974, giving Nixon administration veteran William J. Baroody Jr. a mandate for OPL to become "an instrument for projecting the image of a truly open administration (in contrast to Nixon's) and to secure Ford's election in 1976. Under Baroody's direction, the office incorporated outreach efforts with consumers and women that had been located elsewhere in the White House, and the overall staff grew to approximately thirty. At the core of its activities was an aggressive campaign of regional conferences that enabled the nation's first un-elected president to tour the country in a campaign-like atmosphere and prepare the way for an eventual reelection campaign."

Some OPL heads have used the office to push their own agendas. Faith Whittlesey used her time as director of the OPL under Ronald Reagan to increase the influence of the Christian right and anti-communist groups, such as the Contras in Nicaragua.

Prior to Whittlesey, future cabinet secretary and U.S. senator Elizabeth Dole headed OPL under Reagan from 1981 to 1983. Directors during Bill Clinton's administration included future cabinet secretary Alexis Herman, Maria Echaveste, Minyon Moore, and Mary Beth Cahill (future manager of John Kerry's 2004 presidential campaign).

In May 2009, Barack Obama renamed it the Office of Public Engagement (OPE), stating it an announcement "OPE, along with the Office of Intergovernmental Affairs, will serve as the front door to the White House through which ordinary Americans can participate and inform the work of the President. [...] In addition to its traditional White House operations, OPE will now also focus on getting information from the American people outside the Washington beltway through special public events as well as activities on the web site. The office will have a strong on-line presence, including blog postings from OPE staff and other interactive elements". Tina Tchen was then the director of the OPE from 2009 to 2011.

In April 2009, actor Kal Penn was named an associate director in the Office of Public Engagement. His role was said to include outreach to the Asian American and Pacific Islander communities and the arts community. Prior to the appointment, he was a permanent cast member in the television series House, and his acceptance required him to be written out of the series.

In 2017, Donald Trump initially announced his intention to appoint Anthony Scaramucci to oversee the Office of Public Liaison in his administration, pending a review of Scaramucci's finances by the Office of Government Ethics. However, George Sifakis was appointed instead in March 2017.

In November 2020, Joe Biden announced that that office would again be renamed to the Office of Public Engagement. It was headed by Cedric Richmond until his resignation in May 2022, replaced by Adrian Saenz in an acting capacity. Biden introduced a team of social media influencers to operate a Health Care Leaders in Social Media team, whose staff included Joel Bervell.

In January 2025, Trump once again reverted the name.

== List of directors ==
Denotes acting capacity.

| Image | Name | Start | End | President |
|---|---|---|---|---|
| | Chuck Colson | July 9, 1970 | March 10, 1973 | Richard Nixon (1969–1974) |
| | William Baroody | March 10, 1973 | January 20, 1977 | Richard Nixon (1969–1974) |
| | William Baroody | March 10, 1973 | January 20, 1977 | Gerald Ford (1974–1977) |
| | Midge Costanza | January 20, 1977 | September 1, 1978 | Jimmy Carter (1977–1981) |
| | Anne Wexler | September 1, 1978 | January 20, 1981 | Jimmy Carter (1977–1981) |
| | Elizabeth Dole | January 20, 1981 | February 7, 1983 | Ronald Reagan (1981–1989) |
| | Faith Whittlesey | March 3, 1983 | March 19, 1985 | Ronald Reagan (1981–1989) |
| | Linda Chavez | April 8, 1985 | February 4, 1986 | Ronald Reagan (1981–1989) |
| | Mari Maseng | May 12, 1986 | July 1987 | Ronald Reagan (1981–1989) |
| | Rebecca Range | September 2, 1987 | January 20, 1989 | Ronald Reagan (1981–1989) |
| | Bobbie Kilberg | January 20, 1989 | April 6, 1992 | George H. W. Bush (1989–1993) |
| | Cecile Kremer | April 6, 1992 | January 20, 1993 | George H. W. Bush (1989–1993) |
| | Alexis Herman | January 20, 1993 | February 7, 1997 | Bill Clinton (1993–2001) |
| | Maria Echaveste | February 7, 1997 | June 29, 1998 | Bill Clinton (1993–2001) |
| | Minyon Moore | June 29, 1998 | February 5, 1999 | Bill Clinton (1993–2001) |
| | Mary Beth Cahill | February 5, 1999 | January 20, 2001 | Bill Clinton (1993–2001) |
| | Lezlee Westine | January 20, 2001 | May 25, 2005 | George W. Bush (2001–2009) |
| | Rhonda Keenum | May 25, 2005 | March 20, 2007 | George W. Bush (2001–2009) |
| | Julie Cram | March 20, 2007 | January 20, 2009 | George W. Bush (2001–2009) |
| | Tina Tchen | January 20, 2009 | January 5, 2011 | Barack Obama (2009–2017) |
| | Jon Carson | January 5, 2011 | March 14, 2013 | Barack Obama (2009–2017) |
| | Paulette Aniskoff | March 14, 2013 | January 20, 2017 | Barack Obama (2009–2017) |
| | George Sifakis | January 20, 2017 | March 6, 2017 | Donald Trump (2017–2021) |
| | George Sifakis | March 6, 2017 | September 25, 2017 | Donald Trump (2017–2021) |
| | Johnny DeStefano | September 25, 2017 | February 9, 2018 | Donald Trump (2017–2021) |
| | Johnny DeStefano | February 9, 2018 | March 18, 2018 | Donald Trump (2017–2021) |
| | Justin Clark | March 18, 2018 | December 7, 2018 | Donald Trump (2017–2021) |
| | Steve Munisteri; Acting | December 7, 2018 | February 2, 2019 | Donald Trump (2017–2021) |
| | Tim Pataki | February 2, 2019 | January 20, 2021 | Donald Trump (2017–2021) |
| | Cedric Richmond | January 20, 2021 | May 18, 2022 | Joe Biden (2021–2025) |
| | Adrian Saenz; Acting | May 18, 2022 | June 30, 2022 | Joe Biden (2021–2025) |
| | Keisha Lance Bottoms | July 1, 2022 | April 1, 2023 | Joe Biden (2021–2025) |
| | Steve Benjamin | April 1, 2023 | January 20, 2025 | Joe Biden (2021–2025) |
| | Jim Goyer | January 20, 2025 | present | Donald Trump (2025–present) |

=== Public Engagement and Intergovernmental Affairs ===
During the Obama administration, there was a director of public engagement and intergovernmental affairs who sat above the public engagement director and intergovernmental affairs director.

| Image | Name | Start | End | President |
|---|---|---|---|---|
| | Valerie Jarrett | January 20, 2009 | January 20, 2017 | Barack Obama (2009–2017) |
