= Maria Echaveste =

White House Deputy Chief of Staff

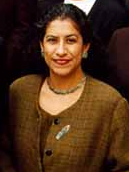
- Echaveste in 1998

White House Deputy Chief of Staff for Policy
- In office June 29, 1998 – January 20, 2001
- President: Bill Clinton
- Preceded by: Sylvia Burwell
- Succeeded by: Joshua Bolten

Director of the Office of Public Liaison
- In office February 7, 1997 – June 29, 1998
- President: Bill Clinton
- Preceded by: Alexis Herman
- Succeeded by: Minyon Moore

Personal details
- Born: May 31, 1954 (age 72) Texas, U.S.
- Party: Democratic
- Spouse(s): Stanley Schlein (m. 1989, divorced) Christopher Edley (m. 1999; died 2024)
- Education: Stanford University (BA); University of California, Berkeley (JD)

Maria Echaveste (born May 31, 1954) is an American politician and civil rights activist who was a U.S. presidential advisor to Bill Clinton and White House Deputy Chief of Staff during the second Clinton administration. She is one of the highest-ranking Latinas to have served in a presidential administration. She is currently a Senior Fellow at the Center for American Progress and a co-founder of the Nueva Vista Group, a policy, legislative strategy and advocacy group working with non-profit and corporate clients.

== Early life ==
Echaveste was born in Texas as one of seven children born to Mexican immigrants. Her family later moved to California, where she received a Bachelor of Arts in anthropology from Stanford University in 1976 and a Juris Doctor from the University of California, Berkeley, School of Law (Boalt Hall) in 1980. Following her graduation from Boalt, Echaveste specialized in corporate litigation at the former Los Angeles firm Wyman Bautzer and at Rosenman & Colin in New York.

== Public service ==
From 1993 to 1997, Echaveste served as the administrator of the Wage and Hour Division of the Department of Labor. In that role, she was responsible for the management and policy direction of programs related to a variety of Federal laws, including the Family and Medical Leave Act, the Fair Labor Standards Act, and federal contracting laws. Under her leadership, the Wage and Hour Division initiated an anti-sweatshop initiative, which received an Innovation in American Government Award from the Ash Institute for Democratic Governance and Innovation at Harvard University's John F. Kennedy School of Government in 1996.

From February 1997 to May 1998, Echaveste served as the Director of Public Liaison at the White House, where she developed communications, legislative and public outreach strategies. From 1998 to 2001, she served as assistant to the president and deputy chief of staff to President Bill Clinton. Echaveste managed President Clinton's domestic policy initiatives on education, civil rights, immigration and bankruptcy reform. She also coordinated relief efforts within the White House for foreign and domestic disasters, and specialized in international issues related to Latin America including the Caribbean Basin Initiative, the Africa Growth Opportunity Act, and Plan Colombia, a federal effort to assist Colombia in its anti-drug campaign. At the end of the Clinton administration, Echaveste was responsible for managing the White House preparations for the millennium celebrations and the 2000 presidential transition.

== Current activities ==
After leaving the White House, Echaveste co-founded the Nueva Vista Group, a strategic and policy consulting group that works with nonprofit organizations, associations and corporations on such issues as immigration, health care, telecommunications, labor and finances. She left the consulting firm in 2014. She is a part-time lecturer at the University of California, Berkeley. She currently resides in both California and Washington, D.C., and is the president and CEO of the Opportunity Institute, a research-oriented non-profit focusing education policy and economic mobility generally.

Echaveste was a commentator on the PBS television show "To the Contrary." During the 2004 Democratic primaries, she was a senior adviser to Howard Dean and frequently spoke for him on talk shows. Echaveste is currently a commentator on MSNBC. She is a member of the executive committee of the Democratic National Committee and Mi Familia Vota. She previously was a member of the board of directors of People for the American Way, the Children's Law Center of Washington, D.C., CARE, a humanitarian organization fighting global poverty, and the Level Playing Field Institute, an organization devoted to promoting fairness in education and the workplace. She was married to Chris Edley, whom she met while working together in the Clinton Administration.

In 2010 she served as Secretary of State Hillary Clinton's special representative to Bolivia. In September 2014, President Barack Obama nominated Echaveste to become the United States Ambassador to Mexico. She would have become the first woman to hold the position but she withdrew her name from consideration on January 31, 2015.

Political offices
Preceded by Alexis Herman	Director of the Office of Public Liaison; 1997–1998	Succeeded by Minyon Moore
Preceded by Sylvia Burwell	White House Deputy Chief of Staff for Policy; 1998–2001	Succeeded by Joshua Bolten
