= Julie E. Cram =

American lobbyist (born 1965)

Julie Cram
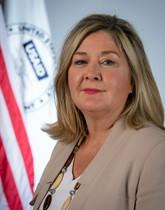

Director of the Office of Public Liaison
- In office March 20, 2007 – January 20, 2009
- President: George W. Bush
- Preceded by: Rhonda Keenum
- Succeeded by: Tina Tchen (Public Engagement); Valerie Jarrett (Public Engagement and Intergovernmental Affairs)

Personal details
- Born: January 23, 1965 (age 61)
- Party: Republican
- Education: American University (BA)

Julie E. Cram (born January 23, 1965) is a Deputy Assistant Administrator for Economic Growth, Education and Environment (E3) at the United States Agency for International Development. She is a former lobbyist for DDR Advocacy and a Republican Party operative who worked for former U.S. President George W. Bush.

== Career ==
George W. Bush appointed Cram to the position of "Director of Public Affairs, International Trade Commission" in 2003. She worked for the Bush-Cheney '04 campaign as the Deputy Communications Director for National Surrogate Media, with the Republican National Committee as the Director of Communications for Victory 2004, and as Director of Surrogate Media Operations for the Republican National Convention. She was named Deputy Assistant to the President and Director of Public Liaison in March 2007.

Cram has also served as Vice President of Corporate Communications at TerreStar Networks Inc., Director of Public Affairs at Burson-Marsteller, and Director of Public Affairs of the International Trade Administration at the Department of Commerce.

In 2013, Cram was a signatory to an amicus curiae brief submitted to the Supreme Court in support of same-sex marriage during the Hollingsworth v. Perry case.

Political offices
Preceded by Rhonda Keenum	Director of the Office of Public Liaison; 2007–2009	Succeeded by Tina Tchen as Director of Public Engagement
Preceded by Rhonda Keenum	Director of the Office of Public Liaison; 2007–2009	Succeeded by Valerie Jarrett as Director of the Office of Public Engagement and Intergovernmental Affairs
