= Craig T. Smith =

American political strategist

Craig Smith

White House Director of Political Affairs
- In office February 7, 1997 – February 5, 1999
- President: Bill Clinton
- Preceded by: Doug Sosnik
- Succeeded by: Minyon Moore

Personal details
- Party: Democratic
- Education: University of Arkansas (BA, JD)

Craig T. Smith is a prominent Democratic Party political strategist who served as White House Political Director during the Clinton administration.

== Career ==
He was described by Time magazine as "something of an adopted son" to President Bill Clinton and Hillary Clinton. He was the first hire of President Bill Clinton's successful campaign during the 1992 election. He began working for President Clinton while he was governor of Arkansas.

He served as senior advisor to Ready for Hillary in 2013-14 and later served as senior advisor to Hillary for America.

In addition to his work for the Clintons, Smith has worked on many political campaigns for figures including as campaign director and senior advisor to Joe Lieberman's 2004 presidential campaign and campaign manager on Al Gore's 2000 presidential campaign.

Smith has also done international campaign work in multiple countries assisting candidates for President or Prime Minister in 24 countries.

Smith's alma mater is the University of Arkansas, where he earned his B.S. in public administration in 1980 and graduated from the School of Law in 1982.

Political offices
Preceded by Doug Sosnik	White House Director of Political Affairs; 1997–1999	Succeeded by Minyon Moore
