= Johnny DeStefano =

American political advisor (born 1979)

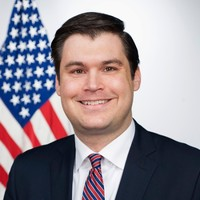
- Official portrait, 2018

Counselor to the President
- In office February 9, 2018 – May 24, 2019; Served alongside Kellyanne Conway
- President: Donald Trump
- Preceded by: Additional office established
- Succeeded by: Derek Lyons

Director of the Office of Public Liaison
- In office September 25, 2017 – March 18, 2018; Acting: September 25, 2017 – February 9, 2018
- President: Donald Trump
- Preceded by: George Sifakis
- Succeeded by: Justin R. Clark

Director of the White House Presidential Personnel Office
- In office January 20, 2017 – February 9, 2018
- President: Donald Trump
- Preceded by: Valerie Green
- Succeeded by: Sean Doocey

Personal details
- Born: 1979 (age 46–47) Kansas City, Missouri, U.S.
- Party: Republican
- Education: Saint Louis University (BA)

Johnny DeStefano (born 1979) is an American political advisor who served as Assistant to President Donald Trump and Counselor to the President from 2017 to May 2019. He previously oversaw the Office of Intergovernmental Affairs, White House Presidential Personnel Office, Office of Political Affairs, and Office of Public Liaison. DeStefano entered the Trump administration as Director of Presidential Personnel. After leaving the White House, DeStefano was appointed an adviser to the e-cigarette company Juul.

== Career ==
Following his graduation, DeStefano worked for the House Republican Conference as a liaison to outside conservative groups. In 2006, he ran the reelection campaign of Ohio Representative Deborah Pryce.

Prior to his White House positions, DeStefano worked for Ohio Republican Congressman John Boehner. From 2007 to 2011, he was Boehner's political director. From 2011 to 2013, when Boehner was Speaker of the United States House of Representatives, DeStefano served as Boehner's senior advisor. DeStefano also worked with the Republican National Committee building "a 2016 voter file and political database."

== Data Trust ==
In July 2013, DeStefano was named president of Data Trust, a private company that is the primary handler of voter files for the Republican National Committee.

== Trump administration ==
On January 4, 2017, DeStefano was named Director of Presidential Personnel in the Trump administration.

On the evening of January 30, 2017, DeStefano wrote a letter to Acting Attorney General Sally Yates informing her that "the president [had] removed [her] from the office of Deputy Attorney General of the United States." Yates' dismissal followed her decision to inform the United States Department of Justice that she did not see defending Trump's executive order "Protecting the Nation from Foreign Terrorist Entry into the United States" as consistent with her responsibilities.

In May 2019, The Washington Post reported that DeStefano was leaving the administration on May 24 and intended to advise companies including Juul, an e-cigarette company with substantial business before the Food and Drug Administration. He was also appointed to the Fulbright Program's Fulbright Foreign Scholarship Board in 2019, and has served as a director for the National Park Foundation. DeStefano founded consulting group Utility Strategic Advisors and registered in 2020 as a lobbyist in Missouri.

Political offices
Preceded by George Sifakis	Director of the Office of Public Liaison; 2017–2018	Succeeded by Justin R. Clark
