= Doug Sosnik =

American political strategist

Senior Advisor to the President
- In office November 7, 1998 – January 20, 2001
- President: Bill Clinton
- Preceded by: Rahm Emanuel
- Succeeded by: Karl Rove

White House Director of Political Affairs
- In office February 16, 1995 – February 7, 1997
- President: Bill Clinton
- Preceded by: Joe Velasquez (Acting)
- Succeeded by: Craig T. Smith

Personal details
- Born: Douglas Brian Sosnik; September 26, 1956 (age 70)
- Party: Democratic
- Education: Duke University (BA)

Douglas Brian Sosnik (born September 26, 1956) is an American political strategist.

Sosnik is a 1978 graduate of Duke University.

Sosnik is affiliated with the Democratic Party, and notably served as the political director for President Bill Clinton during his second term. He also was a campaign strategist for Massachusetts Senator John Kerry during his unsuccessful 2004 presidential bid. Prior to joining the Clinton administration, Sosnik was the chief of staff for Connecticut Senator Chris Dodd, and later worked with the Democratic Congressional Campaign Committee. He was also an informal adviser to Mark Warner, the former governor of Virginia during his preparation for a possible 2008 run for president.

Sosnik is a co-author of Applebee's America: How successful political, business and religious leaders connect with the New American Community.

In 2020, Sosnik joined the strategic advisory firm Brunswick Group. Past Sosnik clients have included the National Basketball Association, the Motion Picture Association of America, CNBC, The Rockefeller Foundation and the University of North Carolina. Per the 2020 announcement press release, he has also advised over 50 U.S. Senators and governors.

Political offices
Preceded by Joe Velasquez; Acting	White House Director of Political Affairs; 1995–1997	Succeeded by Craig T. Smith
Preceded by Rahm Emanuel	Senior Advisor to the President; 1998–2001; Served alongside: Sidney Blumenthal, Joel Johnson	Succeeded by Karl Rove
