= Rhonda Keenum =

American political advisor (born 1961)

Director of the Office of Public Liaison
- In office May 25, 2005 – March 20, 2007
- President: George W. Bush
- Preceded by: Lezlee Westine
- Succeeded by: Julie Cram

Personal details
- Born: Rhonda Newman; 1961 (age 64–65) Booneville, Mississippi, U.S.
- Party: Republican
- Spouse: Mark Keenum
- Education: Mississippi State University (BA)

Rhonda Newman Keenum (born 1961) is an American political advisor working as a lobbyist for The WIT Group. Keenum had previously served in the administration of President George W. Bush.

== Career ==
Rhonda Keenum served as director of the Office of Public Liaison from August to February 2006. She was also assistant secretary for trade promotion and director general of the United States Commercial Service, where she managed operations dedicated to assisting American companies to export and succeed in global markets.

Prior to joining the Administration, Keenum served as Senior Vice President of Edelman, a public relations firm. Earlier in her career, she worked for Congressman Roger Wicker as his administrative assistant and press secretary. Keenum also served as deputy director of convention and meetings at the Republican National Committee.

== Personal life ==
Rhonda Keenum is married to Mississippi State University president Mark E. Keenum.

Political offices
Preceded by Lezlee Westine	Director of the Office of Public Liaison; 2005–2007	Succeeded by Julie Cram
