= George Sifakis =

American businessman and politician (born 1969)

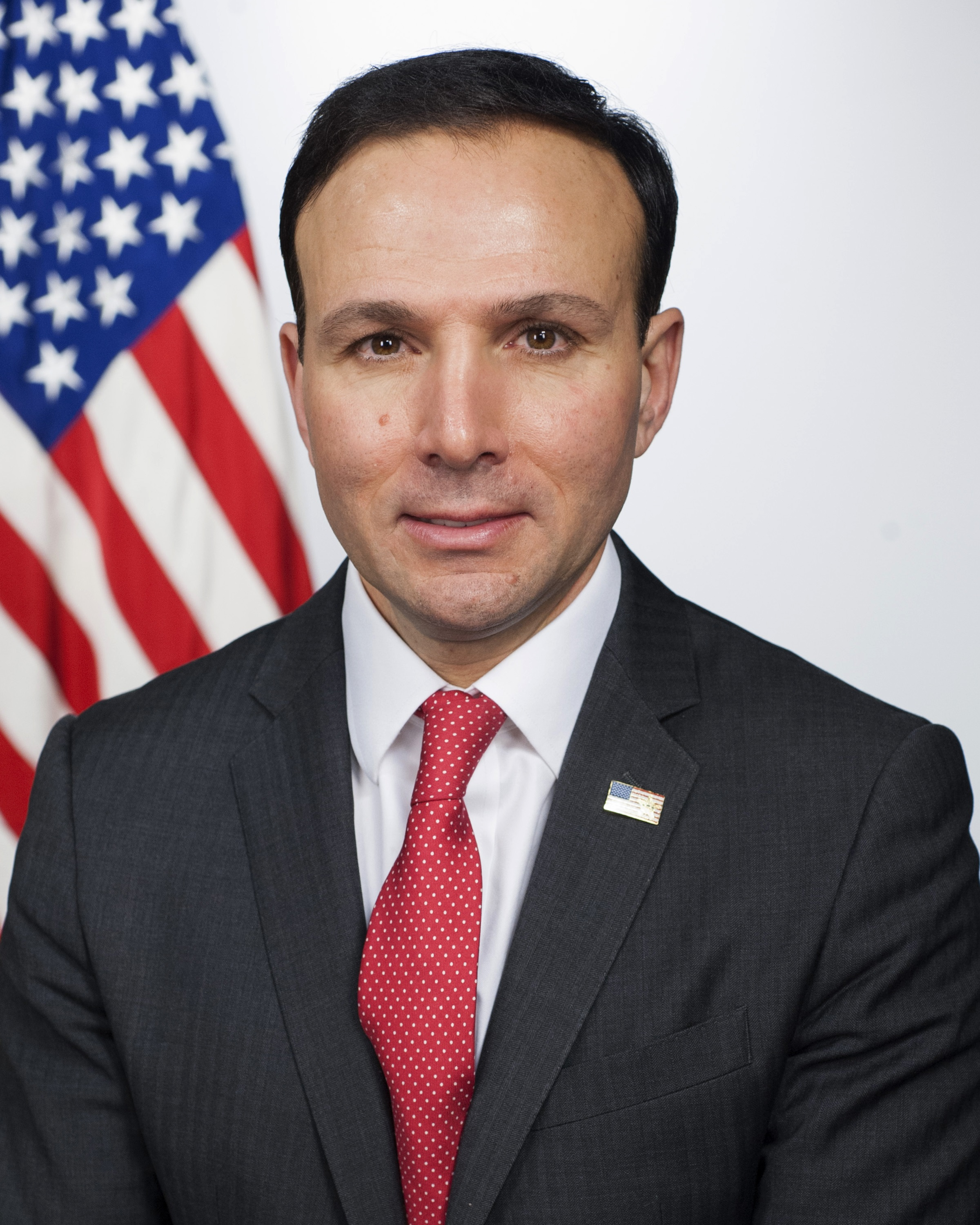

Director of the Office of Public Liaison
- In office January 20, 2017 – September 25, 2017; Acting: January 20, 2017 – March 6, 2017
- President: Donald Trump
- Preceded by: Paulette Aniskoff (Public Engagement); Valerie Jarrett (Public; Engagement and Intergovernmental; Affairs)
- Succeeded by: Johnny DeStefano

Personal details
- Party: Republican
- Education: Rhode Island College (BA); Suffolk University (MS); Southern New England School of Law

George Anthony Sifakis (born 1969) is a former United States federal government official and government relations professional. Since November 2017, he is the CEO of Ideagen Global. He previously served in the transition team for Donald Trump's first presidency at the Department of Commerce, before serving on the Senior Staff as Assistant to the President (AP) and Director Director of the Office of Public Liaison in the Trump administration from January to September 2017.

== Early life and education ==
Sifakis is Greek Orthodox. He received a BA from Rhode Island College and obtained a paralegal certification from Northeastern University. In 2000, he received a Master of Science in Political Science from the Suffolk University Graduate School of Government. Sifakis also completed the Harvard Kennedy School Executive Education program on Governance and attended the Southern New England School of Law. Sifakis earned his Executive MBA at Georgetown University, May 2026. Sifakis is single and divorced and lives in Alexandria, Virginia.

== Government career ==
Sifakis was a member of the George W. Bush White House.

In November 2016, Sifakis was named to the Department of Commerce "landing team" as part of the transition process for President Donald Trump. Sifakis assisted with the confirmation process of Wilbur Ross as Secretary of Commerce.

Sifakis joined the Administration as Special Assistant to the President and Deputy Director of Public Liaison on January 23, 2017, and was subsequently appointed Assistant to the President and later Director of the Office of Public Liaison on March 6, 2017, one of approximately 20 senior White House staff directly reporting to the White House Chief of Staff, Reince Priebus.

On August 18, 2017, multiple Trump administration sources acknowledged that Sifakis would be departing the White House in September. An official White House statement, as reported by The Wall Street Journal's Michael C. Bender in an official Twitter post, included Sifakis' originally planned mid-September departure:

White House Statement from Sarah Huckabee Sanders on August 18 from WSJ: "This has been a long-planned departure – George has been a loyal member of the Trump Administration and we are very grateful for his dedicated service and appreciate George's leadership and effective outreach to key constituencies across the country. The Office of Public Liaison has a very robust schedule already set moving forward into the fall and will continue pushing forward on the President's agenda. Johnny DeStefano will serve as the interim director of this office following George's departure in mid-September."

On September 15, 2017, Politico reported that Presidential Personnel Director John DeStefano would temporarily serve as interim Director of the Office of Public Liaison when Sifakis returned to the private sector at the end of the month.

Sifakis is a partner at Capitol Counsel. He was a candidate for a 2025 US Presidential Lifetime Achievement Award for his national service.

Political offices
Preceded by Paulette Aniskoff as Director of Public Engagement	Director of the Office of Public Liaison; 2017	Succeeded by Johnny DeStefano
Preceded by Valerie Jarrett as Director of the Office of Public Engagement and Intergovernmental Affairs	Director of the Office of Public Liaison; 2017	Succeeded by Johnny DeStefano
