= Jim Jordan (political consultant) =

American political consultant

Personal details
- Born: January 26, 1961 (age 64); Winston-Salem, North; Carolina, U.S.
- Political party: Democratic
- Education: Hampden-Sydney College (BA); University of North Carolina, Chapel Hill (JD)

James Jordan (born 1961) is an American political consultant. He has worked in Democratic politics in various capacities at the national, statewide, congressional and local levels since 1996. Jordan is best known as the first campaign manager for John Kerry’s unsuccessful 2004 presidential bid.

== Early political career ==
Jordan got his start in politics as Communications Director for then-Congressman Tim Johnson in his successful run for the Senate.

Jordan went on to work as Communications Director for Senators Robert Torricelli and John Kerry. He advised the Democrats on the Senate Government Affairs Committee during the 1997 hearings on the Clinton re-election campaign's fundraising practices, and worked with House Judiciary Committee Democrats during the 1998 Impeachment hearings.

Jordan spent the next two election cycles at the Democratic Senatorial Campaign Committee, where he served as communications director, political director and eventually as executive director.

Jordan directed John Kerry's political operation for more than five years. This included the lead up to Kerry's 2004 presidential bid, which Jordan managed until November 2003 when he was replaced by Mary Beth Cahill.

== Thunder Road Group ==
After leaving the Kerry campaign, Jordan founded The Thunder Road Group, a public relations firm.

During the 2008 cycle, he managed the DSCC's Independent Expenditure program and served as a consultant for Senator Chris Dodd’s failed presidential run. Jordan signed on with Dodd after working for Governor Mark Warner, who ultimately decided against a bid for the White House.

Jordan spent the 2010 cycle working with Democratic media firm Shorr Johnson Magnus.
