= Mark Keenum =

American economist (born 1961)

Mark E. Keenum
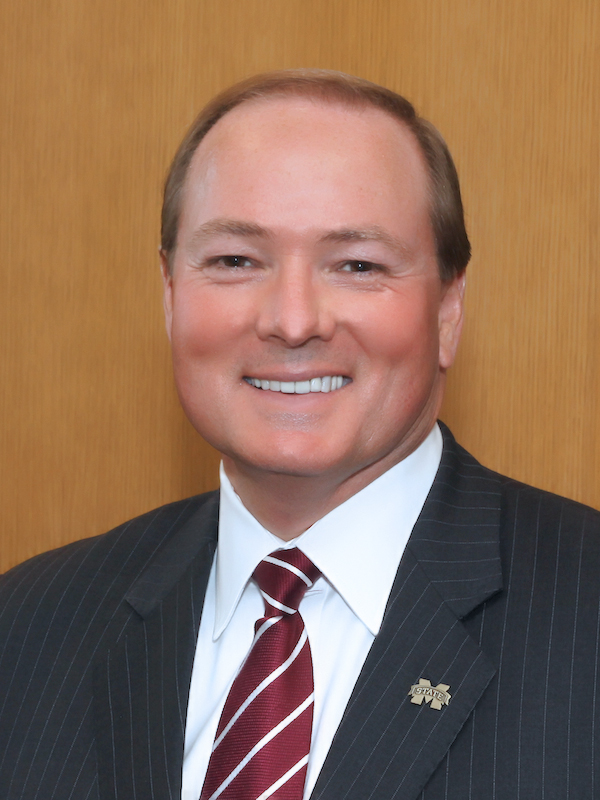
- Keenum in 2014

19th President of Mississippi State University
- Incumbent
- Assumed office January 5, 2009
- Preceded by: Robert H. Foglesong

Chair of Board for International Food and Agricultural Development
- In office April 2018 – January 2022
- Preceded by: Brady Deaton
- Succeeded by: Laurence B. Alexander

Under Secretary of Agriculture for Farm and Foreign Agricultural Services
- In office 2007 – January 20, 2009
- Preceded by: J.B. Penn
- Succeeded by: James W. Miller

Personal details
- Born: January 28, 1961 (age 65) Starkville, Mississippi, U.S.
- Spouse: Rhonda Keenum
- Children: 4
- Education: Northeast Mississippi Community College; Mississippi State University
- Website: Office of the president

Academic background
- Thesis: An economic analysis of farm-raised catfish production in Mississippi with emphasis on costs and cash flows (1988)
- Doctoral advisor: John E. Waldrop

Academic work
- Discipline: agricultural economics
- Institutions: Mississippi State University

Mark Everett Keenum (born January 28, 1961) is an agricultural economist who is the 19th and current university president of Mississippi State University.

He served as a professor at Mississippi State University from 1988 to 1989 and 1997 to 2009, congressional staff of U.S. Senator Thad Cochran from 1989 to 2006, Under Secretary of Agriculture for Farm and Foreign Agricultural Services in the United States Department of Agriculture from 2007 to 2009, and chair of Board for International Food and Agricultural Development (BIFAD) from 2018 to 2022.

== Background ==
Keenum was born in Starkville, Mississippi, on January 28, 1961. He graduated from Corinth High School in Corinth, Mississippi, and was a lineman for the CHS Warriors football team. He also earned an Associate of Arts degree from Northeast Mississippi Community College in Booneville and played on Northeast Tigers football team. He holds a bachelor's degree in agricultural economics (1983), a Master of Science in agricultural economics (1984), and a Ph.D. in Agricultural Economics (1988) from Mississippi State University.

== Career ==
After completing his bachelor's and master's degrees, Keenum joined the MSU faculty as a marketing specialist with the Mississippi Cooperative Extension Service at Mississippi State University (MSU) in 1984.

Two years later, he accepted a position as a research associate with the Mississippi Agricultural and Forestry Experiment Station (MAFES) at MSU. After receiving his Ph.D. in agricultural economics in 1988, Keenum joined the faculty as an assistant professor/economist in Mississippi State's Department of Agricultural Economics. Keenum served on the staff of U.S. Senator Thad Cochran in Washington, D.C., from 1989–2006, first as a legislative assistant for agriculture and natural resources and then as chief of staff.

From 1997 to 2006, Keenum served Mississippi State as an adjunct professor in agricultural economics.

In 2006 Keenum was named the Under Secretary of Agriculture for Farm and Foreign Agricultural Services for the United States Department of Agriculture. In this role Keenum provided leadership and oversight for the Farm Service Agency, the Risk Management Agency, and the Foreign Agricultural Service.

Keenum was named as the 19th president of Mississippi State University in November 2008 and began his term in January 2009.

Keenum serves as chairman of the Southern Association of Colleges and Schools' Commission on Colleges' Executive Council.

He formerly served as a member of the Association of Public and Land-grant Universities board of directors.

Keenum was elected vice-president of the Southeastern Conference Executive Committee in 2015 and serves on the SEC’s Content Committee that oversees the SEC Network. He also represents the SEC as a member of the College Football Playoff's (CFP) Board of Managers. In 2016, he was elected to serve a two-year term as the president of the Southeastern Conference.

In 2018, Keenum was appointed as chair of the Board for International Food and Agricultural Development (BIFAD) by U.S. President Donald Trump. He was later succeeded by Laurence B. Alexander in January 2022.

== Personal life ==
Keenum was born in Starkville, Mississippi, and grew up in Corinth, Mississippi. Keenum is married to the former Rhonda Newman of Booneville, Mississippi, also an MSU graduate. They have four children: Rett, Mary Phillips, Katie, and Torie.

== Honors ==
- Mississippi Delta Council Farm Policy Commendation (1996)
- Second Harvest Distinguished Public Service Award (2008)
- Congressional Awards Program Leadership Award (2010)
- Mississippi Press Association Distinguished Mississippian (2011)
- Seaman A. Knapp Lecturer (2014)

Academic offices
Preceded by Robert H. Foglesong	President of Mississippi State University; 2009 – Present	Incumbent
