= Base Realignment and Closure =

Process of closing some U.S. military bases

Base Realignment and Closure (BRAC) was a process by a United States federal government commission to increase the efficiency of the United States Department of Defense by coordinating the realignment and closure of military installations following the end of the Cold War. Over 350 installations have been closed in five BRAC rounds: 1988, 1991, 1993, 1995, and 2005. These five BRAC rounds constitute a combined savings of $12 billion annually.

== Background ==
The Federal Property and Administrative Services Act of 1949, passed after the 1947 reorganization of the National Military Establishment, reduced the number of U.S. military bases, forts, posts, and stations. The subsequent 1950s buildup for the Cold War (e.g., during the Korean War) resulted in large numbers of new installations, such as the Permanent System radar stations and Semi-Automatic Ground Environment (SAGE) control centers. By 1959, plans for even larger numbers of Cold War installations were canceled (e.g., DoD's June 19, 1959, Continental Air Defense Program reduced the number of Super Combat Center underground nuclear bunkers to 7). In 1958, U.S. intercontinental ballistic missiles (ICBMs) began to replace Strategic Air Command bombers. From 1960 to 1964, the Eisenhower and Kennedy administrations closed 574 U.S. military bases around the world, particularly after President John F. Kennedy was briefed after his inauguration that the missile gap was not a concern.

1961 closures
On March 28, 1961, President Kennedy announced the closure of 73 military establishments.

1964 closures
In December 1963, Secretary McNamara announced the closure of twenty-six DOD installations or activities in the CONUS.

1965 closures
Secretary of Defense Robert McNamara announced 95 base closures/realignments in November 1964: 80 in the United States (33 states & DC) and 15 overseas. Closures included the Brooklyn Navy Yard, the Brooklyn Army Terminal, the Springfield Armory, six bomber bases, and 15 Air Defense Command radar stations—a realignment transferred Highlands Air Force Station to the adjacent Highlands Army Air Defense Site.

1968 Project 693
Project 693 was established by Defense Secretary Clark Clifford during the Vietnam War for reducing programs and personnel, and the project also closed several military installations.

1969 realignments
The DoD realigned 307 military bases beginning with an announcement in October 1969.

1973 closures
224 closures were announced in 1973.

1974 Project Concise
Project Concise eliminated most of the Project Nike missile locations which generally each had two sites, a radar station on an elevated landform for guidance and command/control, and a launch area that had launch rails and stored missiles and warheads. A 1976 follow-on program to Concise closed additional installations.

1983 Grace Commission
The Grace Commission was President Ronald Reagan's "Private Sector Survey" on cost control that concluded that "savings could be made in the military base structure" and recommended establishing an independent commission to study the issue. Public Law 100–526 endorsed the review in October 1988 and authorized the "special commission to recommend base realignments and closures" to the Secretary of Defense and provided relief from NEPA provisions that had hindered the base closure process.

1988 Carlucci Commission
On May 3, 1988, the Carlucci Commission was chartered by Secretary of Defense Frank Carlucci, which in December 1988 recommended closing five Air Force bases: Chanute Air Force Base in Illinois, George Air Force Base, Mather Air Force Base and Norton Air Force Base in California, and Pease Air Force Base in New Hampshire.

== Law ==
The Defense Base Realignment and Closure Act of 1990 provided "the basic framework for the transfer and disposal of military installations closed during the base realignment and closure (BRAC) process". The process was created in 1988 to reduce pork barrel politics with members of Congress that arise when facilities face activity reductions.

The most recent process began May 13, 2005, when Secretary of Defense Donald Rumsfeld forwarded his recommendations for realignments and closures to the Base Realignment and Closure (BRAC) Commission. The BRAC is an independent nine-member panel appointed by the President. This panel evaluated the list by taking testimony from interested parties and visiting affected bases. The BRAC Commission had the opportunity to add bases to the list and did so in a July 19, 2005, hearing. The Commission met its deadline of September 2005 to provide the evaluated list to the President, who approved the list with the condition that it could only be approved or disapproved in its entirety. On November 7, 2005, the approved list was then given to Congress, who had the opportunity to disapprove the entire list within 45 days by enacting a resolution of disapproval. This did not happen, and the BRAC Commission's recommendations became final.

== Closures and realignments ==
=== 1988 ===
The 1988 Base Realignment and Closure Commission included:

- Alabama Army Ammunition Plant
- Army Materials Technology Laboratory
- Army Reserve Center Gaithersburg
- Bennett Army National Guard Facility
- Cameron Station
- Cape St. George
- Chanute Air Force Base
- Coosa River Storage Annex
- Defense Mapping Agency site Herndon, Virginia
- Former Nike Site at the Aberdeen Proving Ground
- Fort Bliss (realigned)
- Fort Des Moines
- Fort Detrick (realigned)
- Fort Dix (realigned as Joint Base McGuire-Dix-Lakehurst)
- Fort Douglas
- Fort Holabird
- Fort Meade (realigned)
- Fort Monmouth
- Fort Sheridan
- Fort Wingate Ammunition Storage Depot
- Fort Wingate
- George Air Force Base
- Hamilton Army Airfield
- Indiana Army Ammunition Plant
- Irwin Support Detachment Annex
- Jefferson Proving Ground
- Kapalama Military Reservation Phase III
- Lexington Army Depot
- Lexington-Bluegrass Army Depot
- Mather Air Force Base
- Navajo Depot Activity (turned over to the Arizona Army National Guard)
- Naval Hospital Philadelphia
- Naval Reserve Center Coconut Grove
- Naval Station Galveston
- Naval Station Lake Charles
- Naval Station New York
- Naval Station Puget Sound
- Naval Station San Francisco (realigned)
- New Orleans Military Ocean Terminal
- Nike Washington-Baltimore
- Norton Air Force Base
- Pease Air Force Base (realigned as Pease Air National Guard Base)
- Pontiac Storage Facility
- Presidio of San Francisco
- Pueblo Army Depot (realigned)
- Salton Sea Test Base
- St. Louis Area Support Center Wherry housing
- Tacony Warehouse
- Umatilla Army Depot (realigned)

=== 1990 ===
In 1990, the Navy considered cutting 34 military installations.

In accordance with Pub. L. 101-510, the Defense Base Closure and Realignment Act of 1990, the Defense Base Closure and Realignment Commission recommended the closure of Military Ocean Terminal, Bayonne, New Jersey, and the Oakland Army Base, California, and relocation of MTMC Western Area and MTMC Eastern Area Headquarters to a location to be determined by the Army. The U.S. Army selected Fort Eustis, Virginia, as the preliminary site. Fort Eutis would become the new home of MTMC CONUS Command.

=== 1991 ===
The 1991 Base Realignment and Closure Commission included:

- Beale Air Force Base (realigned)
- Bergstrom Air Force Base
- Carswell Air Force Base (turned over to the United States Navy Reserve and realigned as Naval Air Station Joint Reserve Base Fort Worth)
- Castle Air Force Base
- Eaker Air Force Base
- England Air Force Base
- Fleet Combat Direction Systems Support Activity San Diego (realigned)
- Fort Benjamin Harrison
- Fort Chaffee (unchanged in 1991, turned over to the Arkansas Army National Guard during 1995 BRAC)
- Fort Devens (turned over to the United States Army Reserve and realigned as Devens Reserve Forces Training Area)
- Fort Ord
- Fort Rucker (realigned)
- Grissom Air Force Base (realigned as Grissom Air Reserve Base)
- Hunters Point Annex
- Integrated Combat Systems Test Facility San Diego
- Letterman Army Institute of Research (disestablished)
- Loring Air Force Base
- Lowry Air Force Base
- Marine Corps Air Station Tustin
- Myrtle Beach Air Force Base
- Naval Air Station Chase Field
- Naval Air Station Moffett Field (realigned as Moffett Federal Airfield, to include Moffett Field Air National Guard Base)
- Naval Air Warfare Center Warminster
- Naval Electronic Systems Engineering Center San Diego
- Naval Electronic Systems Engineering Center Vallejo
- Naval Electronic Systems Engineering Center
- Naval Space Systems Activity Los Angeles
- Naval Station Long Beach
- Naval Station Philadelphia
- Naval Station Puget Sound
- Naval Air Weapons Station China Lake (realigned)
- Naval Air Station Point Mugu
- Philadelphia Naval Yard
- Presidio of Monterey (realigned)
- Richards-Gebaur Air Force Base
- Rickenbacker Air Force Base (portion realigned as Rickenbacker Air National Guard Base)
- Sacramento Army Depot
- Williams Air Force Base
- Wurtsmith Air Force Base

=== 1993 ===
The 1993 Base Realignment and Closure Commission included:

- Anniston Army Depot (realigned)
- Camp Evans
- Fort Wingate
- Griffiss Air Force Base
- Homestead Air Force Base (realigned as Homestead Air Reserve Base)
- K.I. Sawyer Air Force Base
- March Air Force Base (realigned as March Air Reserve Base)
- Mare Island Naval Shipyard
- Marine Corps Air Station El Toro
- Naval Air Station Agana
- Naval Air Station Alameda
- Naval Air Station Barbers Point
- Naval Air Station Cecil Field
- Naval Air Station Dallas (realigned as Grand Prairie Armed Forces Reserve Complex)
- Naval Air Station Glenview
- Naval Air Warfare Center Trenton
- Naval Aviation Depot Alameda
- Naval Aviation Depot Norfolk
- Naval Aviation Depot Pensacola
- Naval Electronic Systems Engineering Center, Saint Inigoes
- Naval Hospital Charleston
- Naval Hospital Oakland
- Naval Hospital Orlando
- Naval Reserve Center Gadsden
- Naval Reserve Center Montgomery
- Naval Station Argentia
- Naval Station Charleston
- Naval Station Mobile
- Naval Station Staten Island
- Naval Station Treasure Island
- Naval Supply Center, Oakland
- Naval Training Center Orlando
- Naval Training Center Orlando, McCoy Annex
- Naval Underwater Sound Reference Laboratory, Orlando
- Naval Training Center San Diego
- Newark Air Force Base (privatized as Central Ohio Aerospace and Technology Center with USAF tenants)
- O'Hare Air Reserve Station
- Plattsburgh Air Force Base
- Vint Hill Farms Station
- Williams Air Force Base

=== 1995 ===
The 1995 Base Realignment and Closure Commission included:

- Camp Bonneville
- Castle Air Force Base
- Fitzsimons Army Medical Center
- Fort Chaffee (turned over to the Arkansas National Guard)
- Fort Greely (realigned)
- Fort Indiantown Gap (turned over to the Pennsylvania National Guard)
- Fort McClellan
- Fort Barfoot (turned over to the Virginia National Guard)
- Fort Ritchie
- Kelly Air Force Base (realigned as Kelly Field)
- Letterkenny Army Depot
- McClellan Air Force Base (portion retained as Coast Guard Air Station Sacramento)
- Military Ocean Terminal at Bayonne
- Naval Air Facility Adak
- Naval Air Station South Weymouth
- Naval Air Warfare Center Aircraft Division, Warminster
- Naval Air Warfare Center, Aircraft Division, Indianapolis
- Naval Reserve Center Fayetteville
- Naval Reserve Center Fort Smith
- Naval Reserve Center Huntsville
- Naval Shipyard, Long Beach
- Naval Supply Center, Oakland
- Naval Surface Warfare Center Crane Division
- Naval Surface Warfare Center Dahlgren Division
- Oakland Army Base
- Ontario Air National Guard Station
- Red River Army Depot
- Reese Air Force Base
- Roslyn Air National Guard Station
- Savanna Army Depot Activity
- Seneca Army Depot
- Ship Repair Facility, Guam
- Sierra Army Depot (realigned)
- Stratford Army Engine Plant

=== 2005 ===
The Pentagon released its proposed list for the 2005 Base Realignment and Closure Commission on May 13, 2005 (a date given the moniker "BRAC Friday," a pun on Black Friday). After an extensive series of public hearings, analysis of DoD-supplied supporting data, and solicitation of comments from the public, the list of recommendations was revised by the 9-member Defense Base Closure and Realignments Commission in two days of public markups and votes on individual recommendations (the proceedings were broadcast by C-SPAN and are available for review on the network's website). The Commission submitted its revised list to the President on September 8, 2005. The President approved the list and notified Congress on September 15. The House of Representatives took up a joint resolution to disapprove the recommendations on October 26, but the resolution failed to pass. The recommendations were thereby enacted. The Secretary of Defense must implement the recommendations no later than September 15, 2011.

Major facilities slated for closure included:

- Brooks Air Force Base, Texas, renamed Brooks City-Base after San Antonio assumed control
- Defense Finance and Accounting Service, New York (removed from list 2005)
- Ellsworth Air Force Base, South Dakota (removed from list August 26, 2005)
- Fort Gillem, Georgia
- Fort McPherson, Georgia
- Fort Monmouth, New Jersey
- Fort Monroe, Virginia
- Kulis Air National Guard Base, Alaska
- Naval Air Station Brunswick, Maine
- Naval Air Station Willow Grove Joint Reserve Base, Pennsylvania
- Naval Station Ingleside, Texas
- Naval Station Pascagoula, Mississippi
- Naval Submarine Base New London, Connecticut (removed from list August 24, 2005)
- Navy Supply Corps School
- Otis Air National Guard Base, Massachusetts (removed from list August 26, 2005)
- Portsmouth Naval Shipyard, Kittery, Maine (removed from list August 26, 2005)

Major facilities slated for realignment include:

- Army Human Resource Command (HRC), Missouri, moving to the Fort Knox Military Installation in Kentucky
- Cannon Air Force Base, New Mexico
- Eielson Air Force Base, Alaska
- Elmendorf Air Force Base, Alaska
- Fort Belvoir, Virginia
- Fort Meade, Maryland
- Fort Novosel, Alabama, Aviation Technical Test Center moving to the Redstone Arsenal, Alabama and combining with the Redstone Technical Test Center to form U.S. Army Redstone Test Center
- Grand Forks Air Force Base, North Dakota
- Naval Air Station Oceana, Virginia (extent contingent on reopening the former Naval Air Station Cecil Field in Florida)
- Naval Station Great Lakes, Illinois
- Pope Air Force Base, North Carolina (transferred to the U.S. Army as Pope Army Airfield and merged with Fort Bragg)
- Rome Laboratory, New York
- Walter Reed Army Medical Center, Washington, D.C.

Twenty-six bases were realigned into 12 joint bases, with each joint base's installation support being led by the Army, the Air Force, or the Navy. An example is Joint Base Lewis–McChord, Washington, combining Fort Lewis and McChord Air Force Base.

=== 2015 ===
The 2005 Commission recommended that Congress authorize another BRAC round in 2015 and every eight years thereafter. On May 10, 2012, the House Armed Services Committee rejected calls by the Pentagon for base closures outside of a 2015 round by a 44 to 18 vote. Defense Secretary Leon Panetta had called for two rounds of base closures while at the same time arguing that the alternative of the sequester would be a "meat-ax" approach to cuts which would "hollow out" military forces.

The National Defense Authorization Act for Fiscal Year 2014 specifically prohibits authorization of future BRAC rounds.

In May 2014, it was attempted to fund another round of BRAC, although funding was not approved in a vote in May of that year.

In March 2015, the Acting Assistant Secretary of Defense for Energy, Installations, and Environment addressed the possibility of a future BRAC, indicating that the DOD, Defense Secretary Ash Carter was requesting authority to conduct another BRAC.

In September 2015, at the tenth anniversary of the end of the most recent BRAC commission report, its former chairman Anthony Principi wrote, "Now is the time to do what's right for our men and women in uniform. Spending dollars on infrastructure that does not serve their needs is inexcusable."

== Appropriations ==
The following is a chronological timeline of authorizations for U.S. Congressional legislation related to U.S. defense installation realignments and military base closures.

Date of Enactment	Public Law Number	U.S. Statute Citation	U.S. Legislative Bill	U.S. Presidential Administration
October 24, 1988	P.L. 100-526	102 Stat. 2623	S. 2749	Ronald W. Reagan
November 5, 1990	P.L. 101-510	104 Stat. 1485	H.R. 4739	George H.W. Bush
October 3, 1995	P.L. 104-32	109 Stat. 283	H.R. 1817	William J. Clinton
September 16, 1996	P.L. 104-196	110 Stat. 2385	H.R. 3517	William J. Clinton
September 30, 1997	P.L. 105-45	111 Stat. 1142	H.R. 2016	William J. Clinton
September 20, 1998	P.L. 105-237	112 Stat. 1553	H.R. 4059	William J. Clinton
August 17, 1999	P.L. 106-52	113 Stat. 259	H.R. 2465	William J. Clinton
July 13, 2000	P.L. 106-246	114 Stat. 511	H.R. 4425	William J. Clinton
November 5, 2001	P.L. 107-64	115 Stat. 474	H.R. 2904	George W. Bush
October 23, 2002	P.L. 107-249	116 Stat. 1578	H.R. 5011	George W. Bush
November 22, 2003	P.L. 108-132	117 Stat. 1374	H.R. 2559	George W. Bush
October 13, 2004	P.L. 108-324	118 Stat. 1220	H.R. 4837	George W. Bush
2005	P.L.		H.R. 4302	George W. Bush

== See also ==
- Joint bases of the United States military
- Loss of Strength Gradient
- Treaty on Conventional Armed Forces in Europe
