= 1993 Base Realignment and Closure Commission =

The 1993 Base Realignment and Closure Commission preliminary list was released by the United States Department of Defense in 1993 as part of the Base Realignment and Closure Commission. It recommended closing 33 major United States military bases.

== Commissioners ==
Chairman: Jim Courter Commissioner: CAPT Peter B. Bowman, USN (Ret) Commissioner: Beverly B. Byron Commissioner: Rebecca G. Cox Commissioner: GEN H.T. Johnson, USAF (Ret) Commissioner: Harry C. McPherson Jr. Commissioner: Robert D. Stuart Jr.

== Recommendations ==
Major facilities slated for closure included:

- Camp Evans
- Fort Wingate
- Griffiss Air Force Base
- Homestead Air Force Base (subsequently realigned as Homestead Air Reserve Base)
- K.I. Sawyer Air Force Base
- March Air Force Base
- Mare Island Naval Shipyard
- Marine Corps Air Station El Toro
- Naval Air Station Agana
- Naval Air Station Alameda
- Naval Air Station Barbers Point
- Naval Air Station Cecil Field
- Naval Air Station Dallas
- Naval Air Station Glenview
- Naval Air Warfare Center Trenton
- Naval Aviation Depot Alameda
- Naval Aviation Depot Norfolk
- Naval Aviation Depot Pensacola
- Naval Electronic Systems Engineering Center, Saint Inigoes
- Naval Hospital Charleston
- Naval Hospital Oakland
- Naval Hospital Orlando
- Naval Station Argentia
- Naval Station Charleston
- Naval Station Mobile
- Naval Station Staten Island
- Naval Station Treasure Island
- Naval Supply Center, Oakland
- Naval Training Center Orlando
- Naval Training Center San Diego
- Newark Air Force Base
- O'Hare Air Reserve Station
- Plattsburgh Air Force Base
- Vint Hill Farms Station

== See also ==
- Loss of Strength Gradient
