= 1988 Base Realignment and Closure Commission =

US government effort to close military bases

The 1988 Base Realignment and Closure Commission preliminary list was released by the United States Department of Defense in 1988 as part of the Base Realignment and Closure Commission. It recommended closing 17 major United States military bases.

== Commissioners ==
The commission was made up of the following members:

- Chairmen
  - Jack Edwards
  - Abraham A. Ribicoff
- Members
  - Louis W. Cabot
  - W. Graham Claytor, Jr.
  - Donald F. Craib, Jr.
  - Thomas F. Eagleton
  - Martin R. Hoffmann
  - Bryce Poe II
  - William H. Rowden
  - James C. Smith
  - Donni A. Starry
  - Russell E. Train

== Recommendations ==
Facilities slated for closure/realignment/redirection included:

- Alabama Army Ammunition Plant
- Army Materials Technology Laboratory
- Army Reserve Center Gaithersburg
- Bennett Army National Guard Facility
- Cameron Station
- Cape St. George
- Chanute Air Force Base
- Coosa River Storage Annex
- Coraopolis Family Housing Site 71
- Coraopolis Family Housing Site 72
- Defense Mapping Agency site Herndon, Virginia
- Dry Hill Family Housing
- Family Housing Ansonia 04
- Family Housing Bedford 85
- Family Housing Beverly 15
- Family Housing Burlington 84
- Family Housing Davisville
- Family Housing East Windsor 08
- Family Housing Fairfield 65
- Family Housing Hull 36
- Family Housing Manchester 25
- Family Housing Middletown 48
- Family Housing Milford 17
- Family Housing Nahant 17
- Family Housing New Britain 74
- Family Housing North Smithfield 99
- Family Housing Orange 15
- Family Housing Plainville 67
- Family Housing Portland 36
- Family Housing Randolph 55
- Family Housing Shelton 74
- Family Housing Swansea 29
- Family Housing Topsfield 05
- Family Housing Wakefield 03
- Family Housing Westport 73
- Former Nike Site at the Aberdeen Proving Ground
- Fort Bliss (Realign)
- Fort Des Moines
- Fort Devens (Realign)
- Fort Detrick (Realign)
- Fort Dix (Realign)
- Fort Douglas
- Fort Holabird (Realign)
- Fort Meade (Realign)
- Fort Monmouth (Realign)
- Fort Sheridan
- Fort Wingate Ammunition Storage Depot
- Fort Wingate
- George Air Force Base
- Hamilton Army Airfield
- Indiana Army Ammunition Plant
- Irwin Support Detachment Annex
- Jefferson Proving Ground
- Kapalama Military Reservation Phase III
- Lexington Army Depot
- Lexington-Bluegrass Army Depot
- Manassas Family Housing
- Manhattan Beach Housing
- Mather Air Force Base (Redirect)
- Midway Housing Site
- Navajo Depot Activity
- Naval Hospital Philadelphia
- Naval Reserve Center Coconut Grove
- Naval Station Galveston
- Naval Station Lake Charles
- Naval Station New York
- Naval Station Puget Sound
- Naval Station San Francisco (Realign)
- New Orleans Military Ocean Terminal
- Nike Kansas City 30
- Nike New York 01 Housing
- Nike New York 25 Housing
- Nike New York 54 housing
- Nike New York 60 housing
- Nike New York 79/80 housing
- Nike New York 93/94
- Nike New York 99 Housing
- Nike Norfolk 85 Housing
- Nike Philadelphia 41/43
- Nike Washington-Baltimore
- Norton Air Force Base
- Pease Air Force Base (transferred to the New Hampshire Air National Guard)
- Pittsburgh 02 Family Housing
- Pittsburgh 03 Family Housing
- Pittsburgh 25 Family Housing
- Pittsburgh 37 Family Housing
- Pittsburgh 42 Family Housing
- Pittsburgh 43 Family Housing
- Pittsburgh 52 Family Housing
- Pontiac Storage Facility
- Presidio of San Francisco
- Pueblo Army Depot (Realign)
- Salton Sea Test Base
- St. Louis Area Support Center Wherry housing
- Sun Prairie Family Housing
- Tacony Warehouse
- USARC Addison Housing and Worth Family Housing
- Umatilla Army Depot (Realign)
- Woodbridge Housing Site
- Youngs Lake Housing Site

== See also ==
- Loss of Strength Gradient
