= Rebecca Gernhardt Cox =

American business executive and former Director of the Office of Public Liaison

Rebecca Cox
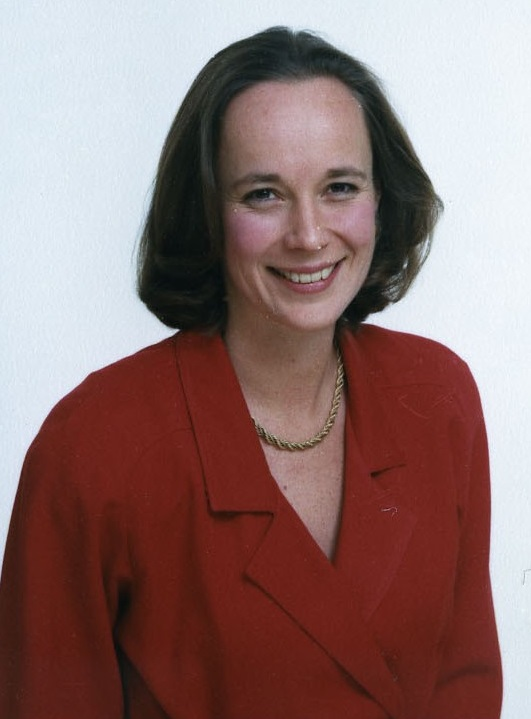

9th Director of the Office of Public Liaison
- In office September 2, 1987 – January 20, 1989
- President: Ronald Reagan
- Preceded by: Mari Maseng
- Succeeded by: Bobbie Kilberg

Personal details
- Born: Rebecca Chase Gernhardt; October 23, 1954 (age 71) Mansfield, Ohio, U.S.
- Party: Republican
- Spouse: Christopher Cox (m. 1992)
- Education: DePauw University (BA); Catholic University (JD)

Rebecca Gernhardt Cox (née Chase Gernhardt, previously Range; born October 23, 1954) is an American business executive and former Director of the Office of Public Liaison during the administration of President Ronald Reagan.

== Career ==
Until the 2010 merger of Continental Airlines and United Airlines, Rebecca Cox was the Senior Vice President of Continental Airlines, Inc. She joined Continental in January 1989, and currently serves as a consultant to United Airlines, the successor company. During her tenure as an executive with Continental, the airline emerged from bankruptcy and rose from being ranked last in every measurable performance category to winning more J. D. Power and Associates awards for Customer Satisfaction than any other airline in the world. As of 2010, Continental was the No. 1 Most Admired Global Airline in rankings by Fortune magazine, and had received this distinction every year from 2004 to 2009.

In 1993, while Cox was a top Continental executive, President George H. W. Bush appointed her to serve as a Commissioner on the 1993 Base Realignment and Closure Commission, responsible for the closure of excess military installations. Subsequently, President Bill Clinton appointed her to the 1995 Base Realignment and Closure Commission, making her the only person to serve as a member of two Base Closure Commissions.

Before joining Continental, Cox served in the White House as Assistant to the President and Director of the Office of Public Liaison. In this capacity, she was responsible for leading President Ronald Reagan's primary outreach effort to the private sector. She was also appointed by President Reagan to serve as Chairman of the Interagency Committee for Women's Business Enterprise.

Prior to her 1987 White House appointment, Cox served as Assistant Secretary of the U.S. Department of Transportation for Governmental Affairs. Her previous posting at the Department of Transportation was as Counselor to Secretary Elizabeth Dole (1984-1985) and as Deputy Assistant Secretary for Governmental Affairs (1983-1984).

During several previous years on Capitol Hill, Cox served as Chief of Staff to the Senate Majority Whip, Ted Stevens (1977-1983), and as a staff member to U.S. Representative John Ashbrook (1976-1977).

Cox received a B.A. degree from DePauw University, Greencastle, Indiana, in 1976 and a J.D. degree from the Columbus School of Law, Catholic University, Washington, D.C., in 1981.

=== Personal life ===
On August 29, 1992, Cox married then-U.S. Representative Christopher Cox. She was previously married to James Davis Range, an environmental lawyer and lobbyist.

Political offices
Preceded by Mari Maseng	Director of the Office of Public Liaison; 1987–1989	Succeeded by Bobbie Kilberg
