= NJM =

- New Jersey Manufacturers Insurance Company - Insurance Company
- New Jewel Movement - populist Marxist political movement in Grenada
- New Justice Machine - comic trilogy
- New Youth of Macau (Nova Juventude de Macau) - a political party in Macau
