= U.S. Army Redstone Test Center =

Coordinates: 34.6457°N 86.6627°W

Redstone Test Center
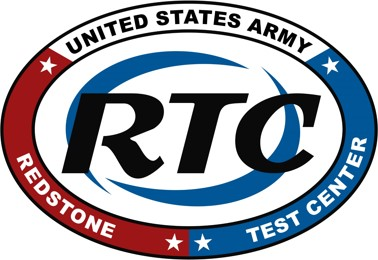
- Active: Oct 1, 2010 – present
- Country: United States
- Branch: United States Army
- Part of: United States Army Test and Evaluation Command
- Garrison/HQ: HQ - Redstone Arsenal, AL
- Motto: Truth

Commanders
- Current commander: Colonel Steven Braddom

U.S. Army Redstone Test Center, or RTC, is subordinate organization to the United States Army Test and Evaluation Command, a direct reporting unit of the United States Army responsible for developmental testing, independent evaluations, assessments, and experiments of Army aviation, missiles and sensor equipment.

RTC is a tenant organization in Redstone Arsenal, AL.

== History ==
The 2005 Base Realignment and Closure directed that the Aviation Technical Test Center in Fort Rucker move to Redstone Arsenal and combine with the Redstone Technical Test Center. RTC was stood up in October 2010.

== Operations ==
RTC's largest customers are Program Executive Office Aviation, and Program Executive Office Missiles and Space along with Program Manager Aircraft Survivability Equipment and the Aviation and Missile Research, Development, and Engineering Center. In addition to supporting Army acquisition efforts, RTC conducts testing with all branches of the military and maintains an extended customer base that includes the department of homeland security, allied foreign countries, industry, and NASA. RTC employs approximately 1,100 military, civilian and contract employees that are skilled test officers, flight test engineers, engineers, scientists, technicians, researchers and experimental test pilots. RTC is a highly reimbursable organization, meaning that the majority of its operating budget comes from direct charges to its customers.

== See also ==
- Redstone Arsenal
- United States Army Test and Evaluation Command
- United States Army
- List of aerospace flight test centres
