= Redstone Technical Test Center =

Former U.S. Army research installation

Coordinates: 34°37′45″N 86°39′34″W

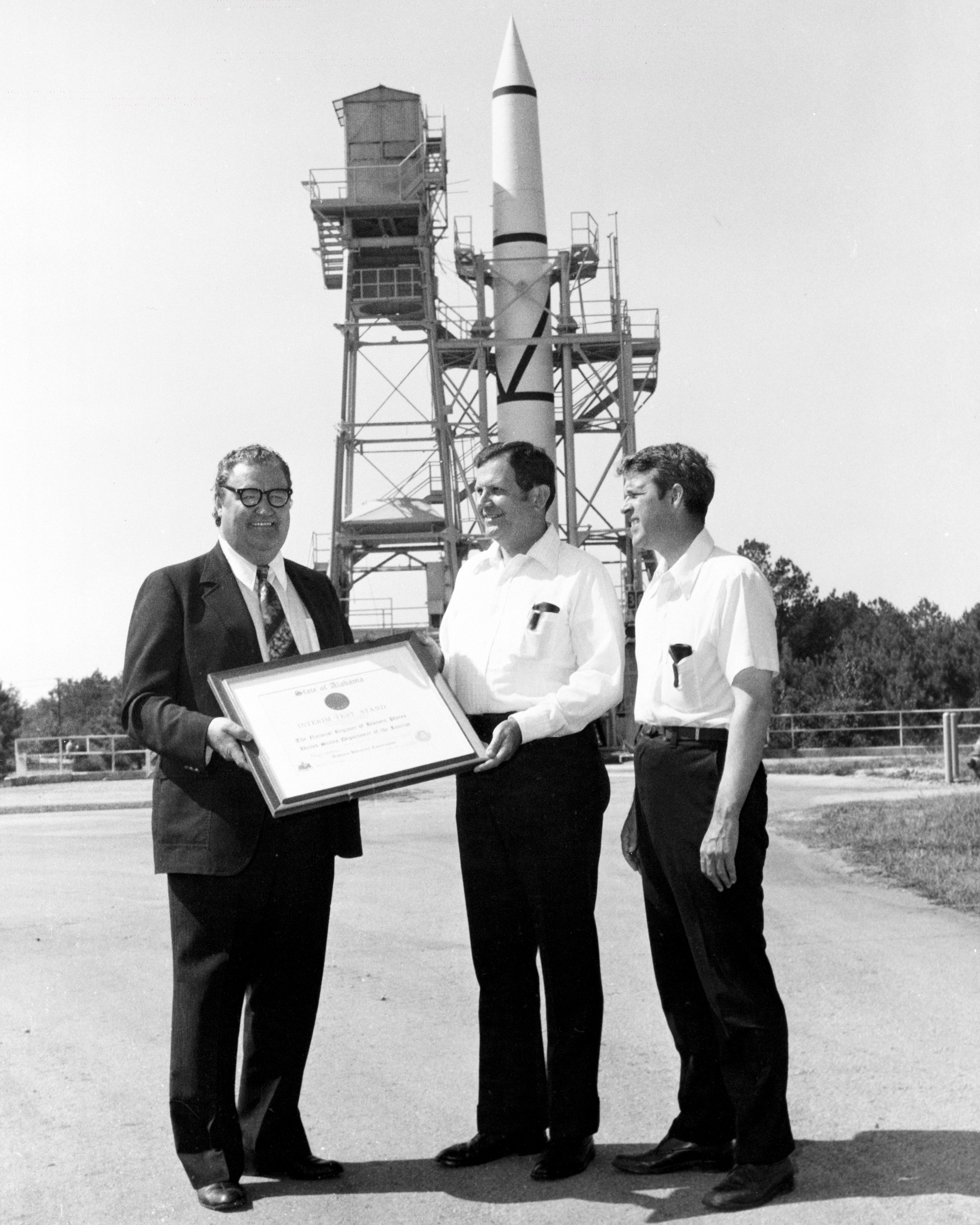
Redstone technical tower, presented by Dr. William Lucas and local administration

The Redstone Technical Test Center (RTTC) was one of eight test centers that comprised the Developmental Test Command within the U.S. Army Test and Evaluation Command. RTTC was responsible for conducting flight-testing of small rockets and guided missiles, as well as performing life cycle testing for weapon components. It occupied over 265 buildings and 14,000 acres (22 sq mi, or 57 km^{2}), or about one-third the area of Redstone Arsenal, near Huntsville, Alabama.

In 2010, the merger of RTTC and the Aviation Technical Test Center (ATTC) formed the U.S. Army Redstone Test Center (RTC).

== History ==
The origin of RTTC traces back to the Test and Evaluation Directorate of the Missile Research, Development and Engineering Center (MRDEC). The directorate conducted testing on a variety of missile components and subsystems. MICOM's RDEC was formed in 1985 as a part of the U.S. Army Missile Command (MICOM), with MICOM having been formed as part of the U.S. Army Materiel Command (AMC) in 1962.

In 1990, the MRDEC Test and Evaluation Directorate became known as the Redstone Technical Test Center (RTTC) when it was transferred to the U.S. Army Test and Evaluation Command (TECOM), a component of AMC.

In October 2010, resulting from the Base Realignment and Closure (BRAC) efforts, RTTC was combined with the Aviation Technical Test Center (ATTC) from Fort Rucker, Alabama, to form the U.S. Army Redstone Test Center (RTC).

== Role in NRPTA ==
RTTC developed a capability of static firing hypergolic, liquid rocket engines. RTTC facilities and procedures were available to test liquid rocket engines of the Army, DoD, NASA, and private industry, as part of the National Rocket Propulsion Test Alliance (NRPTA).
