= Naval Station Pascagoula =

Base of the United States Navy, in Pascagoula, Mississippi

Coordinates: 30.336707°N 88.576872°W

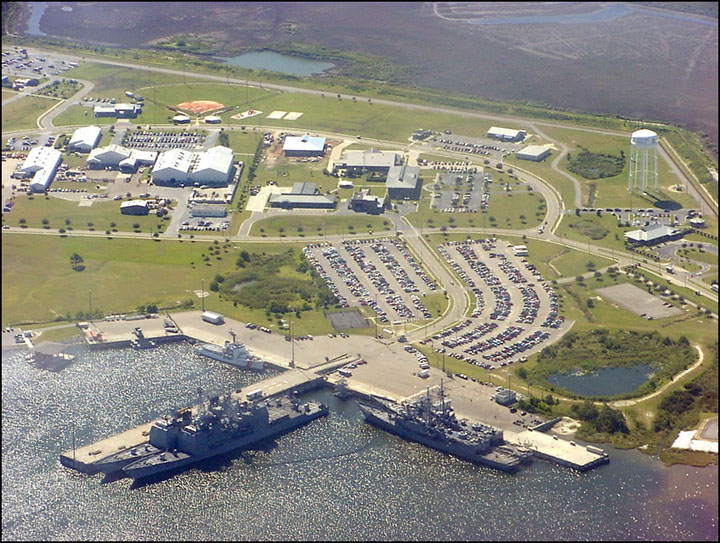
NS Pascagoula

Naval Station Pascagoula (NAVSTA Pascagoula) was a base of the United States Navy, in Pascagoula, Mississippi. The base officially closed 15 November 2006. The base's property, on Singing River Island in the Mississippi Sound at the mouth of the Pascagoula River, was formally transferred to the Mississippi Secretary of State's office 9 July 2007.

== History ==
Singing River Island (437-acre (1.8-km²)) is man-made, having been created over the years as dredge materials from the Pascagoula federal channel and nearby Ingalls Shipbuilding shipyard was deposited in the area. In the early 1980s, the United States Congress approved the strategic homeporting initiative to build additional bases and disperse the Fleet from the main concentration areas. The story of Naval Station Pascagoula began in 1985 when the Secretary of the Navy John Lehman selected the Singing River Island location as one of the new Strategic Homeport sites. Base construction began in 1988, and the station became an operational homeport of Perry-class guided-missile frigates in 1992 with the arrival of the first ship, USS Gallery.

The Naval Station's support mission increased dramatically in subsequent years due to a variety of actions: the Base Realignment and Closure Commission 1993 recommendations, which meant ships and other units moved to Pascagoula from other bases; the reorganization of Commander, Naval Surface Force Atlantic, which homeported Ticonderoga class cruisers in Pascagoula. As part of this reorganization USS Yorktown (CG-48) shifted homeports to Pascagoula in September 1996. The Coast Guard also relocated Coast Guard Station Pascagoula and a Reliance-class (210') Coast Guard cutter to the naval station.

In April 1994, Commander, Destroyer Squadron 6 (COMDESRON 6) changed homeport to Pascagoula, Mississippi and subsequently was dual-hatted as Commander, Naval Surface Group Pascagoula. In January 1996, as a result of a reorganization of the United States Atlantic Fleet, Commander, Naval Surface Group Pascagoula was renamed Commander, Regional Support Group Pascagoula. In April 1998, as the result of yet another reorganization, COMDESRON 6 shifted operational control to Commander, Western Hemisphere Group, and was redesignated as a Tactical Squadron. Around 1998, the squadron included Hall, Ticonderoga, and Yorktown. In December 1999, COMDESRON 6 was redesignated as a Tactical/Readiness Squadron under the operational control of Commander, Naval Surface Group 2. At one point, the composition of Destroyer Squadron 6 included FFG-16 at Mayport, FFG 22 at Charleston, SC, USS Samuel Eliot Morison (FFG-13) at Charleston, SC, FFG 15 at Norfolk, and FFG 20 and FFG 21 at Pascagoula.

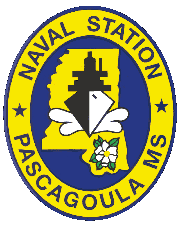
NS Pascagoula logo

The Naval Station provided support not only to personnel stationed on board the station and its homeported ships but also to pre-commissioning crews of surface combatant ships that were being constructed at Ingalls Shipbuilding. Beginning in Fiscal Year 1999, the station assumed ownership and operating responsibility for the Lakeside Naval Support Facility (Lakeside NSF). The Lakeside NSF, located within the city of Pascagoula approximately 10 miles from the main base, provides berthing primarily for the pre-commissioning crews. The base also provided support to the Navy community at large in a variety of ways, most notably through the Fleet and Family Support Center, the Housing Referral Office, and the Morale, Welfare, and Recreation Department.

As of 2005, NAVSTA Pascagoula supported approximately 2,000 active duty military, including those assigned to ships and tenant commands on the station. It employed more than 200 civilian workers; supported 4,100 family members of active duty military; approximately 850 reservists who live in Jackson County; and approximately 4,000 Jackson County retirees and their family members. Total annual economic impact was estimated at $100 million, including payrolls, contracts, goods, and services.

NAVSTA Pascagoula epitomized the "clean sheet" design for a modern naval station. Waterfront support infrastructure at NAVSTA Pascagoula includes a 680-foot (205 m) double-deck pier (utilities on the lower deck; upper deck free for operational support), two quayside berths, and the full range of services for "cold iron" support of homeported and visiting ships. Ship maintenance and repair support is available from the Navy's Shore Intermediate Maintenance Activity (SIMA), or by contract (there are 17 major shipyards/marine contractors located along the Gulf Coast between New Orleans, La., and Panama City, Fla.).

Tenant commands at NAVSTA Pascagoula included

- Shore Intermediate Maintenance Activity, Pascagoula
- Destroyer Squadron 6
- USCG Station Pascagoula

== Base realignment and closure, 2005 ==
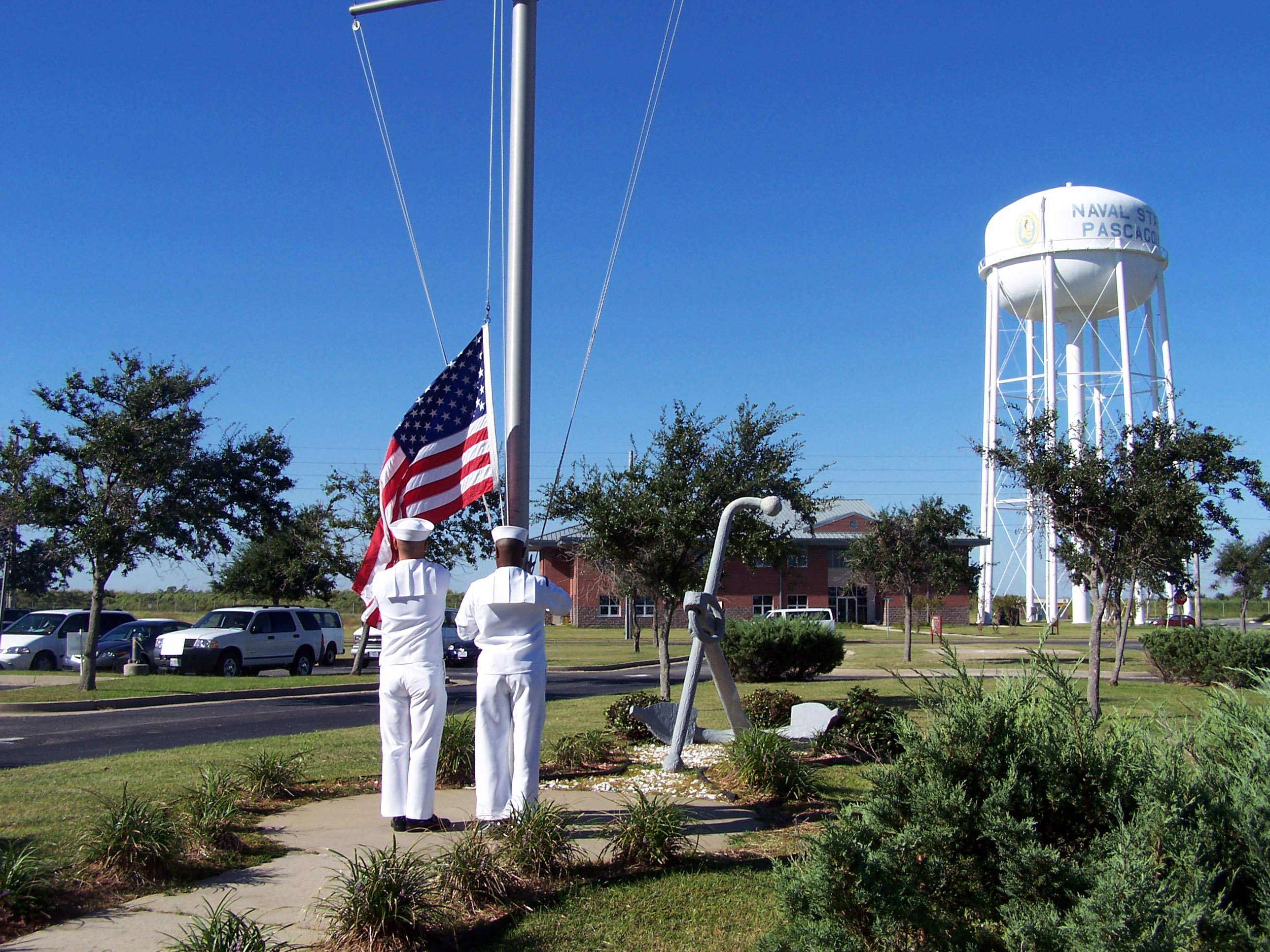
Flag lowering during the disestablishment ceremony of Naval Station Pascagoula.

NAVSTA Pascagoula was marked for consolidation under Defense Secretary Donald Rumsfeld's list of base closings in the May 2005 round. This was a blow to Mississippi Gulf Coast Congressman Gene Taylor (5th Congressional District) and Senators Thad Cochran and Trent Lott, who fought to get Pascagoula off the list in 1995. On 24 August 2005, the Base Realignment and Closure committee voted to include Naval Station Pascagoula on its final list of closures. The base officially closed 15 November 2006 with a disestablishment ceremony held 29 September 2006.
