= Trenton–Mercer Airport =

Airport in Ewing Township, New Jersey, US

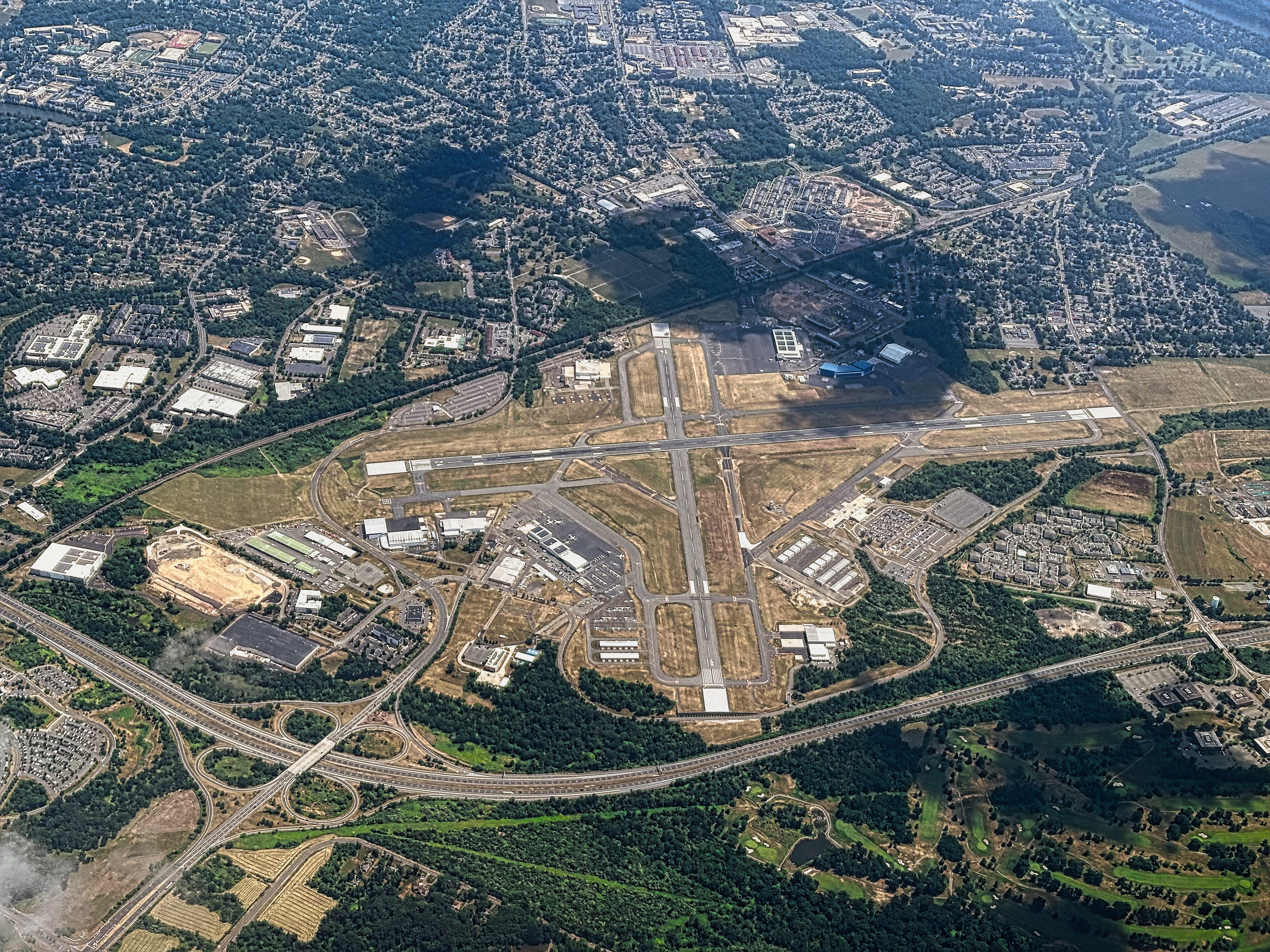
- Trenton–Mercer Airport from the air in 2024
- IATA: TTN; ICAO: KTTN; FAA LID: TTN

Summary
- Airport type: Public / Military
- Owner: County of Mercer
- Operator: Mercer County Department of Transportation & Infrastructure
- Serves: Philadelphia metropolitan area and New York metropolitan area Trenton
- Location: Ewing Township, New Jersey
- Operating base for: Frontier Airlines
- Time zone: EST (UTC−05:00)
  - Summer (DST): EDT (UTC−04:00)
- Elevation AMSL: 212 ft (65 m)
- Coordinates: 40°16′36″N 074°48′48″W
- Website: flytrentonmercer.com

Maps
- FAA airport diagram
- Interactive map of Trenton–Mercer Airport

Runways
Direction	Length		Surface
Direction	ft	m	Surface
06/24	6,006	1,831	Asphalt
16/34	4,800	1,463	Asphalt

Helipads
Number	Length		Surface
Number	ft	m	Surface
H1	64	20	Asphalt
H2	64	20	Asphalt
H3	64	20	Asphalt

Statistics
- Aircraft operations (2019): 112,513
- Based aircraft (2020): 153
- Total passengers served (12 months ending March 2020): 917,000
- Scheduled flights: 5,880
- Source: Federal Aviation Administration, BTS

Trenton–Mercer Airport (IATA: TTN, ICAO: KTTN, FAA LID: TTN) is a county-owned, joint civil–military, public airport located four miles (6.4 km) northwest of Trenton in the West Trenton section of Ewing Township, Mercer County, New Jersey, United States.

Formerly known as Mercer County Airport, the airport serves three scheduled airlines plus general and corporate aviation. The U.S. Department of Transportation reports that approximately 301,000 passengers arrived and 300,000 departed at the airport in the 12 months ending July 2023, for a total of 601,000 passengers.

With an average of 308 aircraft operations per day, Trenton–Mercer is the third-busiest airport in New Jersey after Newark Liberty International Airport's 1,228 per day and Teterboro Airport's 477 per day. As of May 2018, Trenton was the fifth fastest growing airport in the United States.

The Federal Aviation Administration (FAA) National Plan of Integrated Airport Systems for 2023–2027 categorized it as a non-hub primary commercial service facility.

== History ==
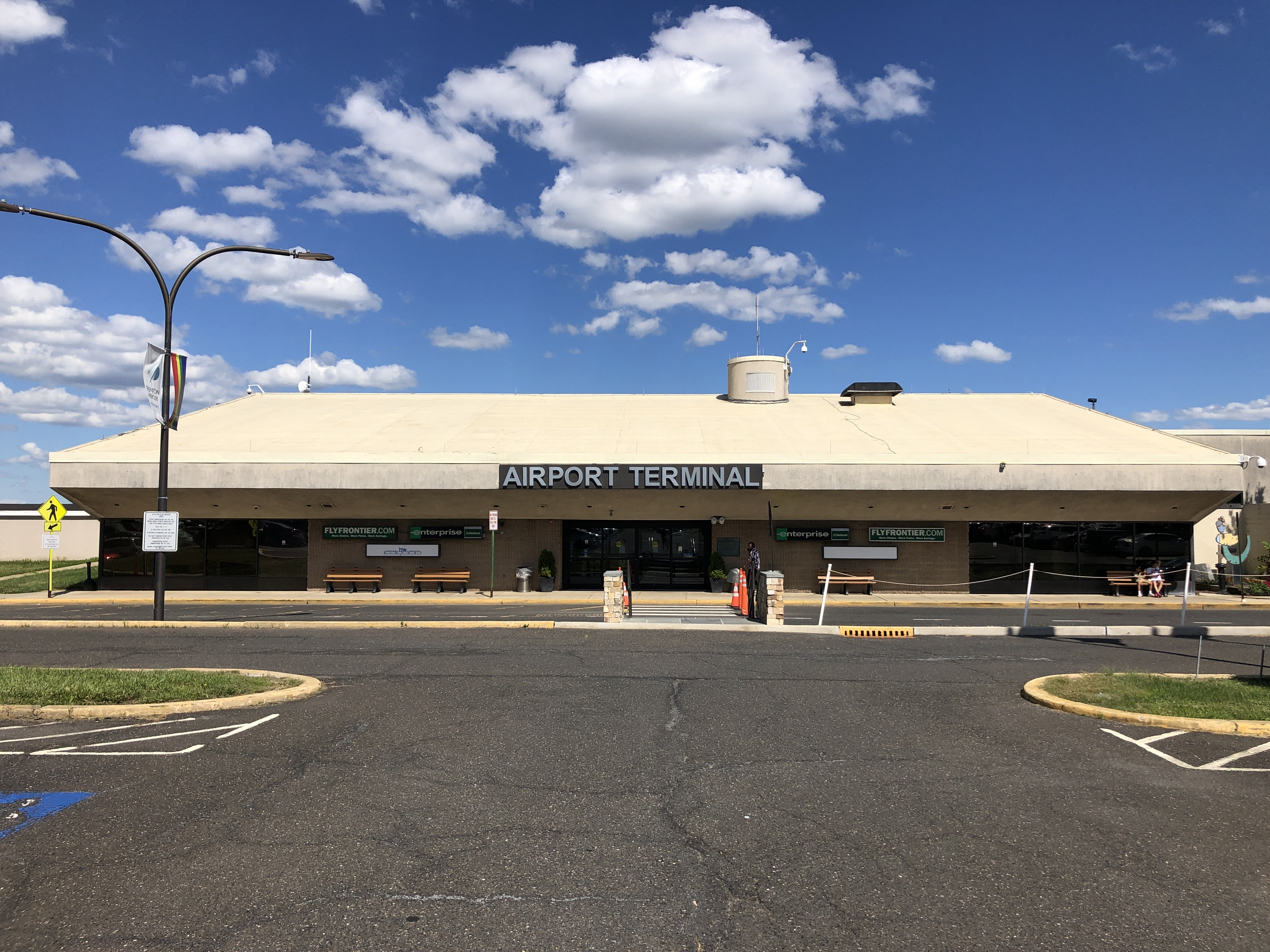
Trenton–Mercer Airport's passenger terminal in 2024

=== Early history ===
The first airplane to land at what is now Trenton–Mercer Airport touched down in 1907, in what was then Alfred Reeder's farm field, just off of Bear Tavern Road in Ewing. Twenty-two years later, in 1929, Skillman Airport opened to the public.

During World War II, the nearby General Motors Inland Fisher Guide Plant ceased producing civilian vehicles and began making Grumman TBF Avenger carrier-based torpedo bombers for the United States Navy. Skillman Airport expanded at this time to accommodate test flights of this aircraft, and after the airport returned to county control following the end of the war, it was renamed Mercer County Airport. After the war, the navy reestablished a presence with the construction of Naval Air Warfare Center Trenton adjacent to the airport, which remained open until 1997.

=== Commercial service era ===
Allegheny McDonnell Douglas DC-9-30s nonstop to Chicago O'Hare Airport in 1977 were probably Trenton's first jet flights. According to the Official Airline Guide (OAG), the only airline serving Trenton in 1976 was Allegheny Commuter operating small Nord 262 commuter turboprops with nonstops from Newark and Philadelphia as well as direct one stop flights from Washington National Airport with all service operated on behalf of Allegheny on a code sharing basis. Ransome Airlines provided non-stop service to Philadelphia and Baltimore in the early 1980s.

The airport's air traffic control operations, based in the control tower, operated between 6AM and midnight during the 1980s and early 1990s. Since January 1994, tower operations have been shortened to 6AM and 10PM.

United flew mainline jet service with Boeing 727-200s and Boeing 737-200s to Trenton direct from Chicago O'Hare Airport in 1984–86. According to the Official Airline Guide (OAG), by late 1989 USAir Express was the only airline serving Trenton with flights operated with small British Aerospace BAe Jetstream 31 commuter turboprop airliners nonstop from both Baltimore and Washington National Airport, flown via a code sharing agreement with USAir.

In 1994, as a cost-cutting measure, the Mercer County Airport Police and Fire Department was disbanded and replaced by the Mercer County Sheriff's Office (police) and ProTec Fire Services (Aircraft Fire Rescue). The following year, in 1995, the airport's name was changed to Trenton–Mercer Airport in an effort to identify it with the city of Trenton – the capital of New Jersey and county seat of Mercer County.

During the mid-to-late 1990s, Eastwind Airlines operated a hub out of Trenton to Florida and North Carolina as well as airports in Massachusetts, New York and Pennsylvania. The airline also flew from Philadelphia for a short time. This was one of the few instances where Trenton–Mercer saw scheduled jet service from its short runways with Boeing 737-200 and 737-700 aircraft although other airlines operated jet service, as well.

From 1998 until 2003, Shuttle America operated a scheduled business commuter service to airports in Connecticut, Massachusetts, New York, Delaware, and North Carolina. The airline flew 50 seat de Havilland Canada Dash 8-311 turboprops and had all its aircraft stocked with in-flight service items when stopping in Trenton. The airline ceased operations at TTN after a codeshare service with US Airways drew customers to nearby Philadelphia from Trenton.

Also occurring in 1998 was the completion of the airport's NWS/FAA automated surface observing system (ASOS), replacing the human weather observers that had previously reported weather conditions; the facility became operational on March 11 of that year.

Beginning in May 2000, Boston-Maine Airways operated the Pan Am Clipper Connection between Trenton–Mercer Airport and Hanscom Field in Bedford, Massachusetts. The flight operated until 2008, was terminated when Boston-Maine Airways ceased operating on February 28 of that year.

In 2006 and 2007, Comair flew to Atlanta and Boston from Trenton as Delta Connection, using Canadair CRJ-200 regional jet aircraft. After a few months, Big Sky Airlines took over the Boston service with Beechcraft 1900 commuter turboprops. The service ended in early January 2008.

On April 4, 2011, Streamline Airlines briefly re-commenced the former Pan-Am Clipper Connection route between Bedford–Hanscom and Trenton, using an Embraer EMB-120 Brasilia turboprop. The carrier was consistently losing money and shut down on September 14, 2012, citing a poor economic climate and unprofitable operations.

In 2012, Frontier Airlines began service at Trenton with flights between it and Florida, utilizing the Airbus A320 family of aircraft. By early 2013, the airline began expanding service and established a base at Trenton.

On November 8, 2013, TTN opened a renovated terminal – including a new modular trailer baggage claim outside the terminal, restrooms in the gate area (there were previously no restrooms past security), and additional passenger seating and a new gate in the area formerly occupied by the original baggage claim.

In August 2014, the airport was awarded $2.2 million to rehabilitate three taxiways. A spokesperson for the county said that this was the first phase of a three-year plan to make further improvements.

In November 2016, Allegiant Air commenced service at Trenton, with flights between it and Orlando, Punta Gorda, and Tampa/St. Petersburg. However, Allegiant ended all service at the airport on April 29, 2018, leaving Frontier as the only commercial tenant; Allegiant returned in February 2026, though, with three routes, all of which, once again, served airports in Florida.

For many years, the county has planned to replace the outdated terminal at the airport. These plans have been opposed by residents along the flight path living in Ewing, Lawrence, Hopewell, and Pennington. Opposition has also been expressed in Pennsylvania among residents living along the flight path in Yardley and Lower Makefield.

== Ground transportation ==
Mercer County has a variety of taxicab companies that operate from the Trenton Transit Center, which services the Northeast Corridor via Amtrak, New Jersey Transit and SEPTA railroads.

NJ Transit Route 608 bus stops on Sam Weinroth Road near the terminal for travel to SEPTA's West Trenton station for connections to SEPTA's West Trenton Line to Center City Philadelphia, Trenton Transit Center for connections to Amtrak, NJ Transit's Northeast Corridor Line to Newark & New York, River Line to Camden, SEPTA's Trenton Line to Center City Philadelphia, other NJ Transit bus routes to points in Mercer County, South Jersey, and Philadelphia, and SEPTA Suburban Bus Route 127 to Oxford Valley Mall in Langhorne, PA, and Hamilton station for connections to NJ Transit's Northeast Corridor Line to Newark & New York.

Tarmac-to-tarmac shuttle
Operator	Destination	Notes	Refs
American Airlines (operated by Landline)	Philadelphia	Passengers check bags & clear security at TTN, and go directly to PHL via motorcoach	

American Airlines announced in July 2025 that it will establish a connecting bus to Philadelphia International Airport from Trenton Airport. The service is ticketed and operated as an airline flight but will utilize buses, given Philadelphia's close proximity to Trenton and available connections as a major hub for American Airlines. This airside-to-airside service, which is solely for screened passengers who booked a seat on the route, is operated by American's bus service partner, Landline, on the airline's behalf. As of September 21, 2025, American Airlines has commenced its bus operations and offered three daily scheduled buses from Trenton to Philadelphia International Airport.

== Facilities and aircraft ==
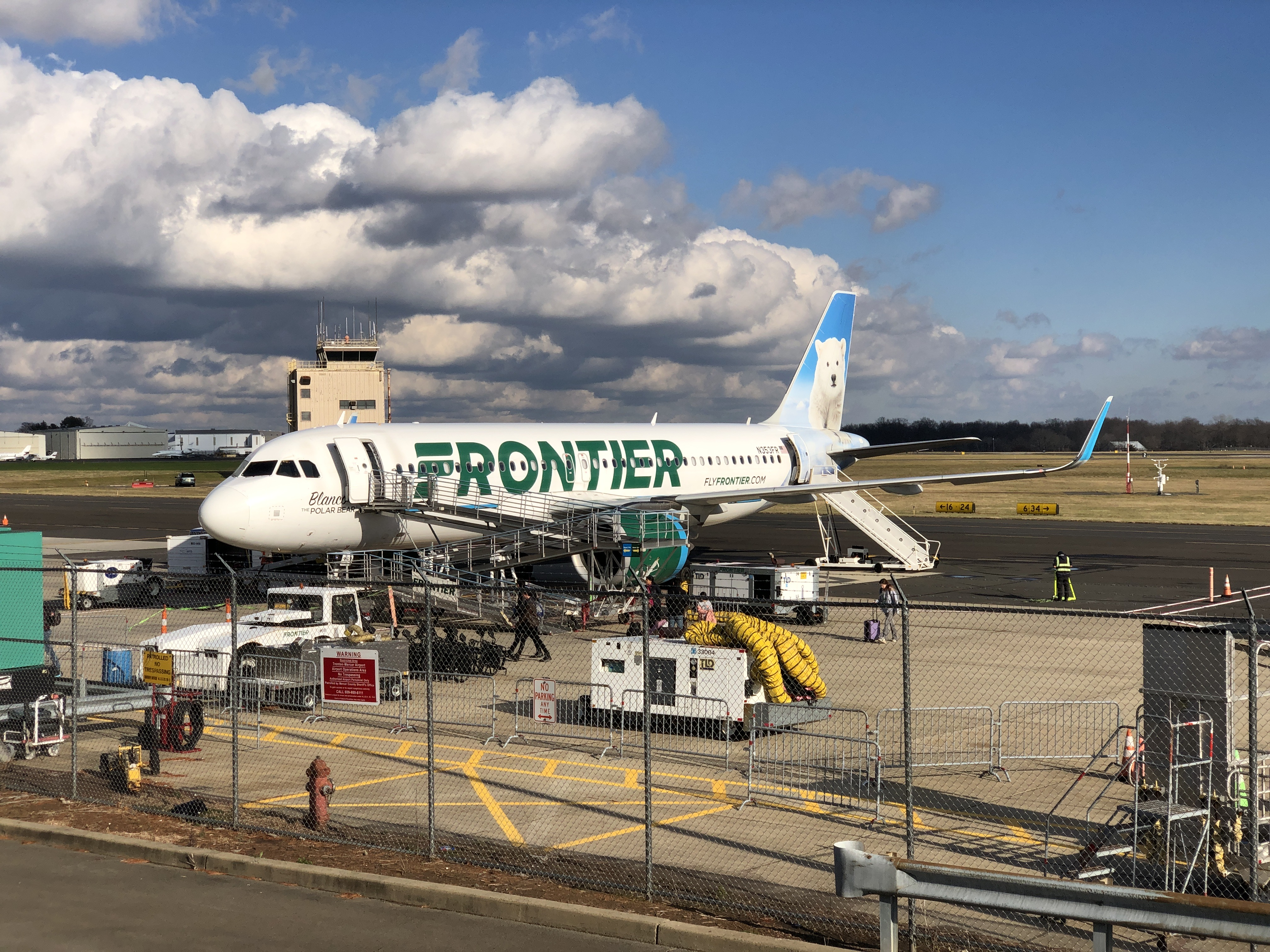
A Frontier Airlines Airbus A320 at the terminal

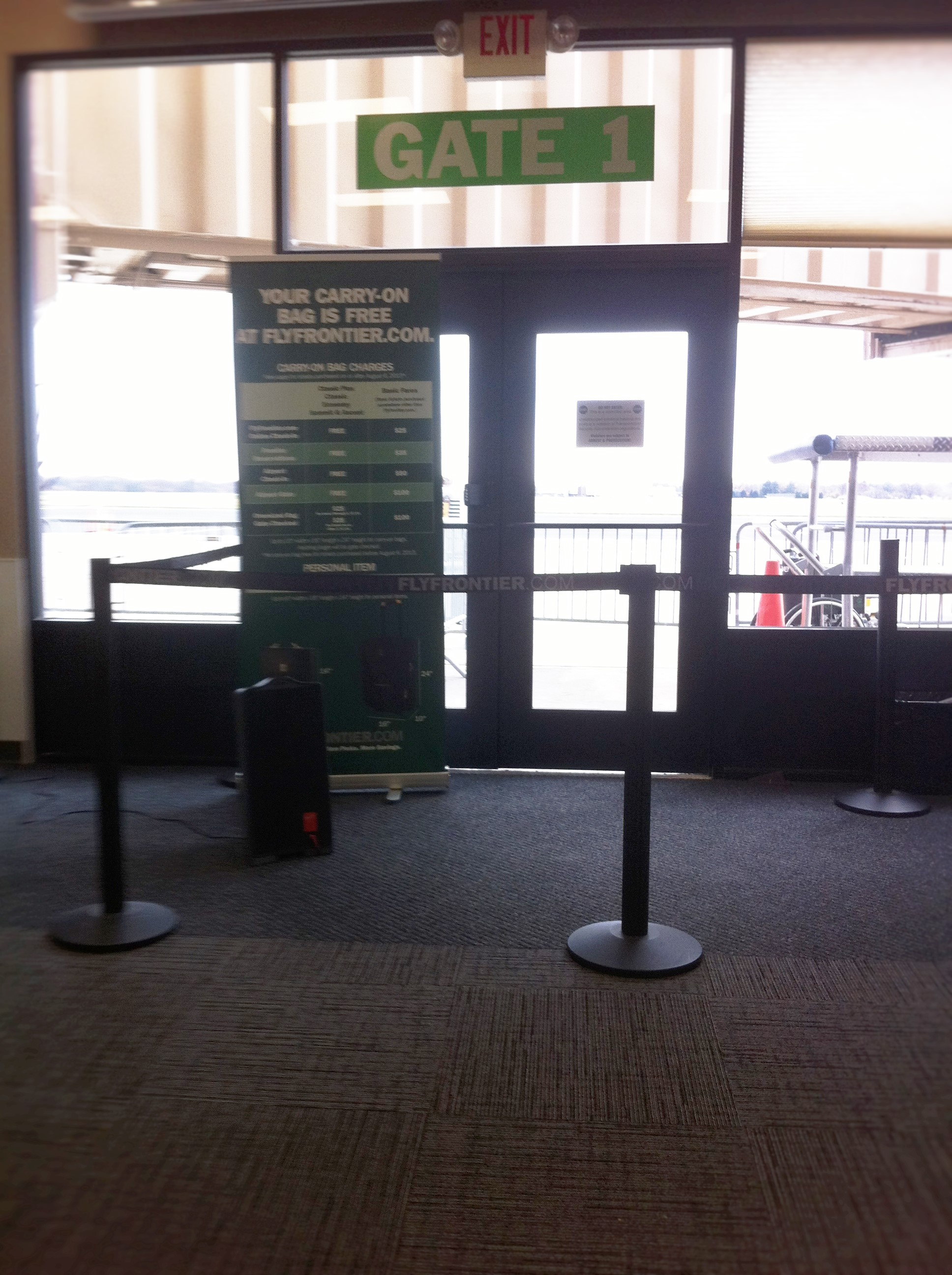
Gate 1

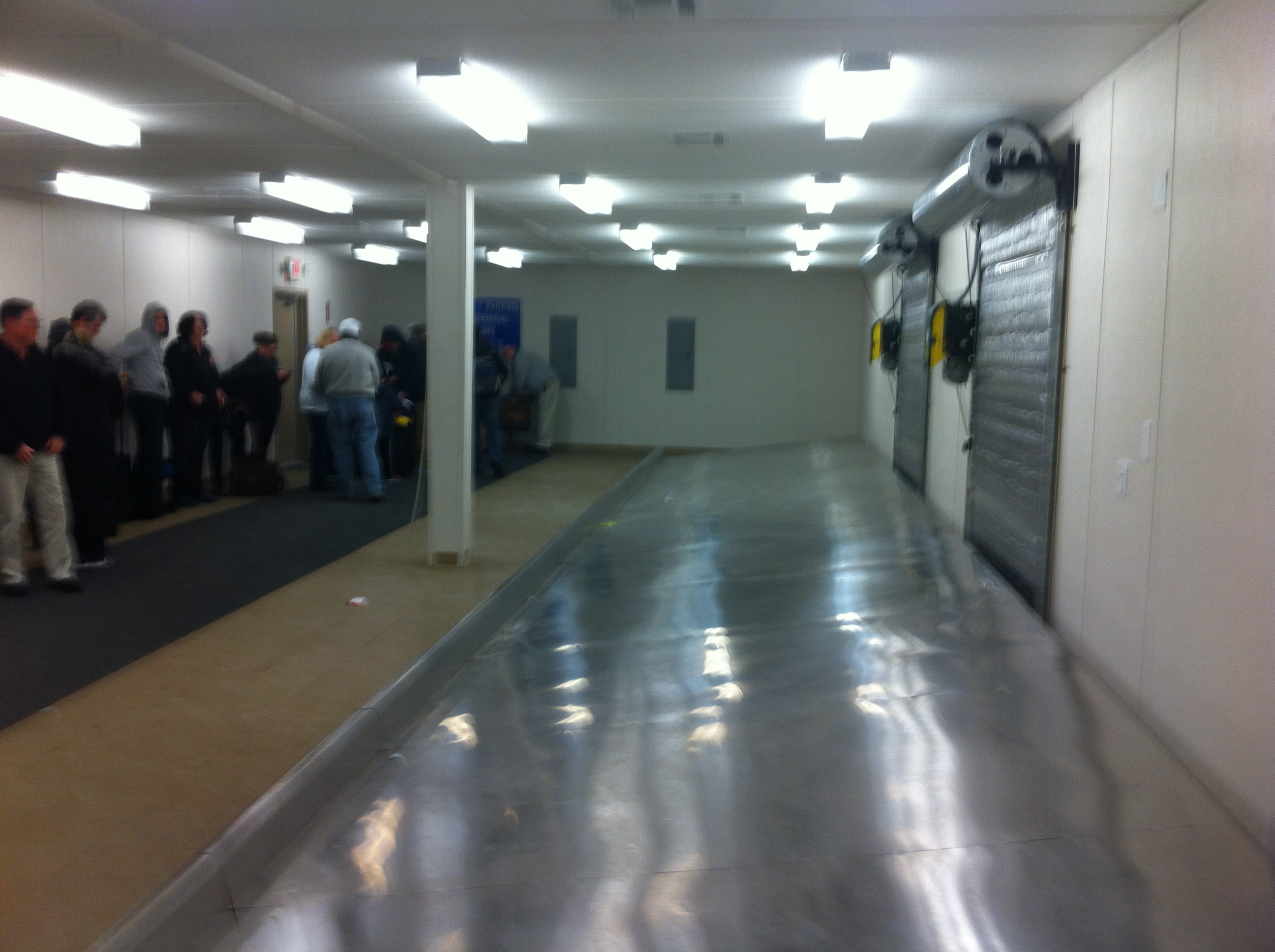
Baggage claim

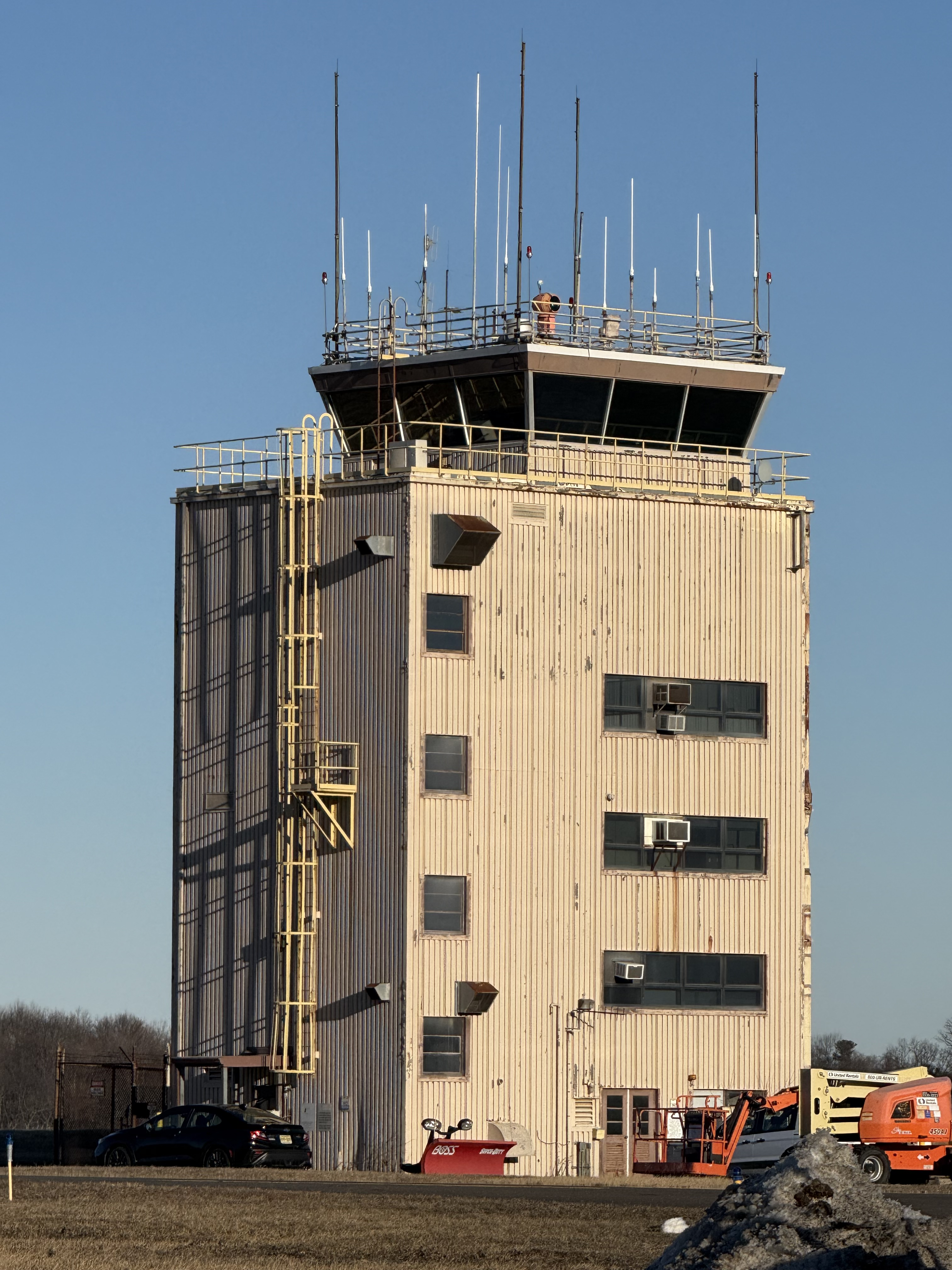
The airport's control tower in 2025

Trenton–Mercer Airport covers 1,345 acres (544 ha) at an elevation of 212 feet (65 m) above mean sea level. It has two asphalt runways: 6/24 is 6,006 by 150 feet (1,831 x 46 m) and 16/34 is 4,800 by 150 feet (1,463 x 46 m). The airport has three helipads, H1, H2, and H3, each 64 by 64 feet (20 x 20 m). To meet FAA requirements that certain runways be equipped with an EMAS bed before the end of 2013, the airport installed EMAS beds at both ends of runway 16/34 in 2012; officials announced plans in early 2013 to close runway 6/24 for two months that fall to install an EMAS bed at both ends.

Trenton–Mercer Airport is home to multiple flight schools including Infinity Flight Group, Mercer County Community College, and an ATP Flight School location.

=== Terminal ===
Trenton–Mercer Airport has one terminal with four gates. Gate 2 is divided into three sub-gates labeled Gates 2–4. On the upper level of the terminal (before security) is an observation lounge as well as a restaurant, Sky Lounge at Ewing, serving pub food. Sky Lounge has another location past security near Gate 1 serving drinks and pre-packaged sandwiches and wraps.

=== Military ===
The airport is home to Army Aviation Support Facility #2 and the 1st Battalion, 150th Aviation Regiment, otherwise known as the 1-150th General Support Aviation Battalion of the New Jersey Army National Guard. Equipped with UH-60 Blackhawk helicopters, the battalion provides ground force commanders of the 42nd Infantry Division (Mechanized) with additional air assault, transportation, re-supply, and command and control assets. In its state role under Title 32 United States Code, the unit also provides emergency logistical support in response to disasters or any other emergency support as may be directed by the Governor of New Jersey.

The airport is also home to the Twin Pine Composite Squadron (NER-NJ-092) of the New Jersey Wing of the Civil Air Patrol.

== Airport operations ==
For the 12-month period ending April 2, 2019, the airport had 112,513 aircraft operations, an average of 308 per day: 92% general aviation, 4% commercial, 4% air taxi, and <1% military. In May 2020, there were 153 aircraft based at this airport: 86 single-engine, 21 multi-engine, 29 jet, and 17 helicopter.

The airport is owned by the County of Mercer and is operated by the Mercer County Department of transportation & Infrastructure.

== Future developments ==
In a study commissioned by the county released in 2013, a new passenger terminal, a corporate office park, medical offices and laboratories, and commercial space would be part of a plan to develop available land at the airport. On September 29, 2016, Mercer County in conjunction with firms Urban Engineers and McFarland Johnson held a public meeting at the nearby West Trenton Ballroom meeting hall. Several aspects of the proposed master plan for the airport were revealed. Plans call for a new terminal sized at 115,000–125,000 square feet. The current terminal is 24,780 square feet. The rental car area will house up to five rental car agencies and with concession, restrooms and gate areas expanding to four times the current area.

In 2021, Mercer County released a draft environmental assessment for public comment revealing the final plans for the terminal, which will be 125,000 square feet (11,600 m^{2}) and includes a 1,000-space, four-level parking garage, which would bring the number of available parking spaces to approximately 2,900.

In March 2022, the FAA issued its approval for the project. At the time, the estimated completion date of the terminal and parking garage was mid-to-late 2024. As of 2024, the estimated completion date has been pushed back to about 2026.

== Airlines and destinations ==
Airlines	Destinations
Allegiant Air	Fort Lauderdale, Orlando/Sanford, Punta Gorda (FL), St. Petersburg/Clearwater
Breeze Airways	Charleston (SC), Fort Myers (begins January 8, 2027), Vero Beach
Frontier Airlines	Orlando, Tampa

Destinations map
Destinations from Trenton-Mercer Airport
Red = Year-round destination
Blue = Future destination
Green = Seasonal destination

== Statistics ==
=== Passenger numbers ===
Annual passenger traffic at TTN, 2002–present
Year	Passengers	Year	Passengers	Year	Passengers	Year	Passengers
2002	15,000	2008	330	2014	294,000	2020	259,000
2003	42,000	2009	0	2015	774,000	2021	488,000
2004	23,000	2010	0	2016	553,000	2022	656,000
2005	17,000	2011	0	2017	722,000	2023	650,000
2006	18,000	2012	4,000	2018	796,000	2024	479,000
2007	48,000	2013	9,000	2019	919,000	2025	309,000

=== Carrier shares ===
Carrier shares (August 2025 – July 2026)
Rank	Carrier	Passengers	% of market
1	Frontier	244,000	86.57%
2	Allegiant	37,850	13.43%

=== Top destinations ===
Busiest domestic routes from TTN (August 2025 – July 2026)
Rank	City	Passengers	Carrier(s)
1	Orlando, Florida	78,970	Frontier
2	Tampa, Florida	32,970	Frontier
3	Fort Lauderdale, Florida	7,570	Allegiant
4	Punta Gorda, Florida	6,720	Allegiant
5	St. Pete/Clearwater, Florida	5,450	Allegiant
6	Atlanta, Georgia	4,020	Frontier
7	Myrtle Beach, South Carolina	3,060	Frontier
8	West Palm Beach, Florida	1,640	Frontier
9	Fort Myers, Florida	530	Frontier

== See also ==
- List of airports in New Jersey
- Aviation in the New York metropolitan area
