= Alexis Herman =

23rd United States Secretary of Labor (1947–2025)

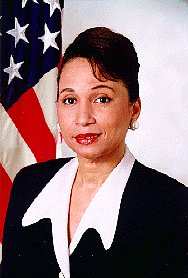
- Official portrait, 1998

23rd United States Secretary of Labor
- In office May 1, 1997 – January 20, 2001
- President: Bill Clinton
- Deputy: Kathryn O. Higgins
- Preceded by: Robert Reich
- Succeeded by: Elaine Chao

12th Director of the Office of Public Liaison
- In office January 20, 1993 – February 7, 1997
- President: Bill Clinton
- Preceded by: Cecile B. Kremer
- Succeeded by: Maria Echaveste

8th Director of the Women's Bureau
- In office April 4, 1977 – January 20, 1981
- President: Jimmy Carter
- Preceded by: Carmen Maymi
- Succeeded by: Lenora Alexander

Personal details
- Born: Alexis Margaret Herman; July 16, 1947 Mobile, Alabama, U.S.
- Died: April 25, 2025 (aged 77) Washington, D.C., U.S.
- Party: Democratic
- Spouse: Charles Franklin (m. 2000; died 2014)
- Relatives: Alex Herman (father)
- Education: Edgewood College (attended); Spring Hill College (attended); Xavier University of Louisiana (BA)

Alexis Margaret Herman (July 16, 1947 – April 25, 2025) was an American political figure who served as the 23rd United States Secretary of Labor from 1997 to 2001 under President Bill Clinton. She was the first Black American to hold the position. She was previously Assistant to the President and Director of the White House Office of Public Engagement.

Herman grew up in Mobile, Alabama. After college, she worked to improve employment opportunities for black laborers and women. She then joined the administration of Jimmy Carter, working as director of the Labor Department's Women's Bureau. She became active in the Democratic party, working in the campaigns of Jesse Jackson and then serving as chief of staff for the Democratic National Committee under Ronald H. Brown. She joined the cabinet of President Bill Clinton in 1997.

Following the defeat of Al Gore in the 2000 presidential election, Herman remained active in Democratic politics, in addition to her participation in the private sector, serving on the boards of corporations such as Coca-Cola and Toyota.

== Early life and education ==
Herman was born on July 16, 1947, in Mobile, Alabama, the daughter of politician Alex Herman and schoolteacher Gloria Caponis, and raised in a Catholic household. Her father became Alabama's first black ward leader. She later recounted how members of the white supremacist group, the Ku Klux Klan, assaulted her father when she was five years old.

When Herman was growing up in Mobile, schools remained racially segregated. Her parents opted to send Alexis to parochial school, including Heart of Mary High School, in part because the teachers included white nuns and priests, and thus would expose her to greater diversity.

As a sophomore, she was suspended from school for questioning the Archdiocese of Mobile's exclusion of black students from religious pageants in which white students participated. Following a week of objection from the parents of Herman's fellow black classmates, she was re-admitted.

After graduating from high school, Herman attended Edgewood College in Madison, Wisconsin, and Spring Hill College in Mobile. She transferred to Xavier University of Louisiana in New Orleans, where she became an active member of the Gamma Alpha Chapter of the Delta Sigma Theta sorority and graduated with a Bachelor of Arts in Sociology in 1969.

== Career ==
After college, Herman returned to Mobile to help desegregate their parochial schools, including the school she herself attended. She was then a social worker with Catholic Charities in Pascagoula, Mississippi, where she advocated for the city's shipyard to offer training to unskilled black laborers. After Pascagoula, Herman moved to Atlanta, Georgia, where she worked as a director of the Southern Regional Council's Black Women's Employment Program, a program designed to promote minority women into managerial or technical jobs.

Later, working at New-York-based consulting firm RTP, Herman led programs designed to provide apprenticeships for women in nontraditional jobs. At RTP, she met Ray Marshall. After Jimmy Carter became president in 1977, he and his incoming Labor Secretary Marshall asked Herman to be director of the Labor Department's Women's Bureau. At age 29, she was the youngest person to hold the position, which required her to work towards improving business opportunities for women. She worked to encourage corporations to hire more minority women, with companies like Coca-Cola, Delta Air Lines, and General Motors making increased diversity a priority in their hiring process.

In 1981, at the end of the Carter administration, Herman left her job in the Labor Department and founded the consulting firm A.M. Herman & Associates. Herman and the firm worked with corporations on a variety of marketing and management issues, including how to develop training programs, marketing strategies, and organizational strategies. She managed the convention team for Jesse Jackson in his 1984 and 1988 bids for the Democratic Party's presidential nomination. Her role working for Jackson's campaign led Herman to serve as chief of staff to Democratic National Committee Chairman Ronald H. Brown, and later as vice chair of the 1992 Democratic National Convention.

=== Director of the Office of Public Liaison ===
After Bill Clinton's victory in the 1992 Presidential election, Herman became deputy director of the Presidential Transition Office. Clinton then appointed her director of the White House Office of Public Liaison, where she was responsible for the administration's relations with interest groups. In that role, Herman repeatedly organized informal dinners to advance White House initiatives or assuage key groups. She earned the support of the National Association for the Advancement of Colored People and the Congressional Black Caucus as part of her outreach efforts. Herman also earned the respect of members of the business community as part of her effort to gain support for the Clinton Administration's trade deal, the North American Free Trade Agreement.

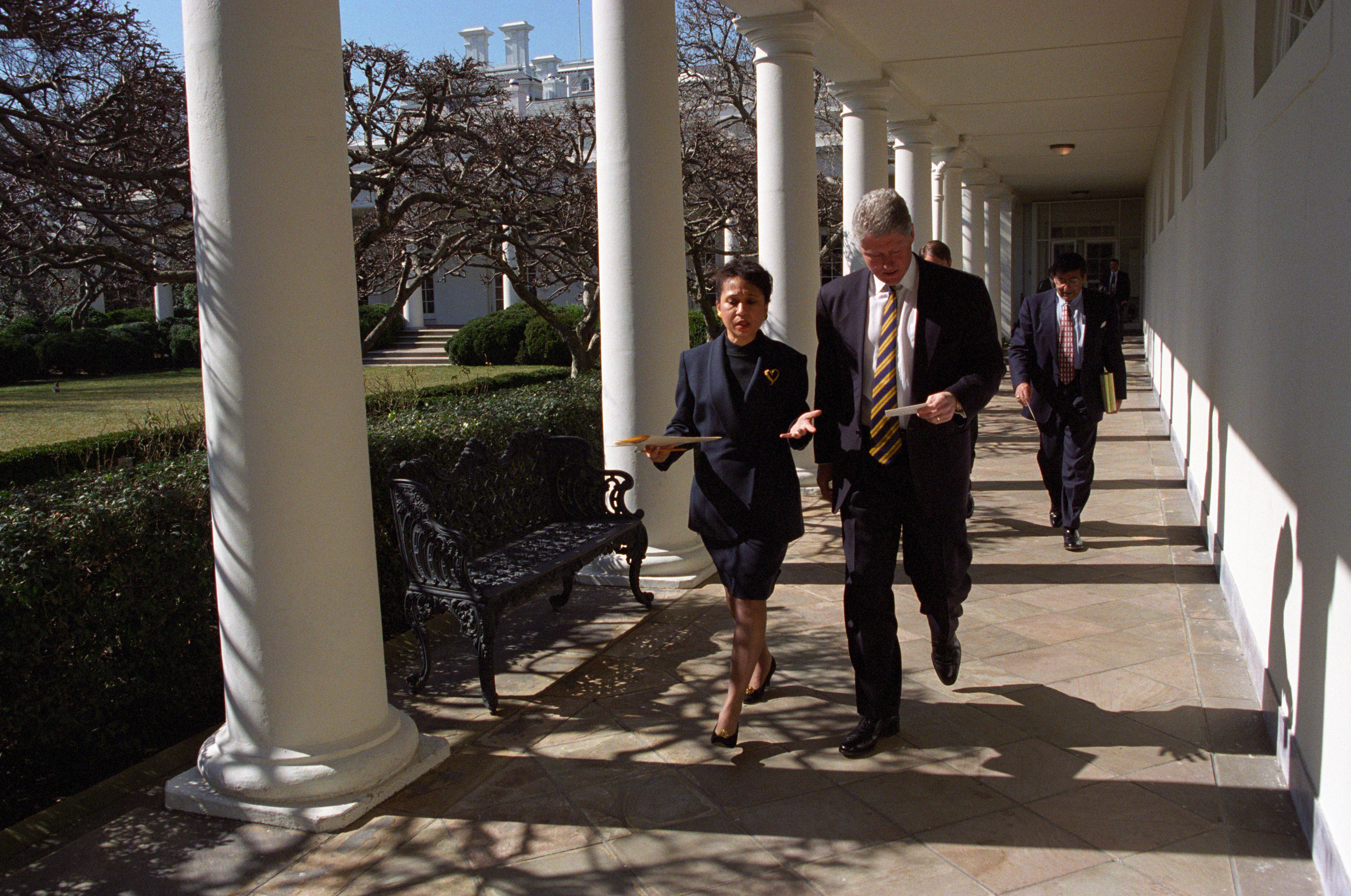
Herman walks along the Colonnade of the White House with President Bill Clinton in February 1995

Herman's time as director also included the death of Commerce Secretary, and Herman's former boss at the Democratic National Committee, Ronald Brown, in a plane crash. As director, Herman made arrangements for public and private grieving following the death. The tragedy strengthened Herman's bond with President Clinton, who like Herman, had been close to Brown.

=== Secretary of Labor ===
In 1996, President Clinton announced his intention to nominate Herman as Secretary of Labor to replace outgoing Secretary Robert Reich. Labor unions publicly supported the nomination, although they had mostly supported other potential nominees such as Harris Wofford, Esteban Edward Torres, and Alan Wheat. Herman's U.S. Senate confirmation was delayed twice. The first resulted from questions regarding her role in organizing White House coffees Clinton used as fundraisers. The second was because Senate Republicans refused to allow a vote on her nomination, as part of their opposition to a proposed executive order related to federal construction projects, which Clinton eventually abandoned. With the delays over, the Senate Labor Committee held its hearing on her nomination on March 18, 1997. Then on April 30, 1997, the Senate voted to confirm by a vote of 85–13. Herman was sworn in on May 9, 1997. She became the first Black-American, and the fifth woman, to serve in the position.

As Secretary of Labor, Herman oversaw the U.S. Department of Labor, which at the time employed 17,000 people and operated on a $39-billion annual budget. The Department of Labor is tasked with enforcing a variety of workplace laws and regulations, including safety issues and anti-discrimination. During Herman's tenure, American unemployment was at its lowest level in decades.

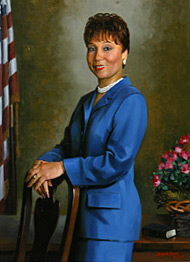
Herman's official U.S. Department of Labor portrait

Herman earned praise from her peers for her handling of the 1997 United Parcel Service (UPS) workers strike, the largest strike in the United States in two decades. After the strike began in August, Herman met privately with the Teamsters' president Ron Carey and the UPS chairman to frame the issues. She was an instrumental mediator in the talks, and the strike was settled after 15 days. Herman's role in resolving the strike raised her public profile as she began to pursue her agenda as Secretary.

As secretary, Herman supported the 1996 and 1997 raises to the minimum wage, increasing it by $0.90 to $5.15 per hour by September 1997. Herman argued the wage hike increased the buying power of workers. She later opposed a 1999 Republican-supported plan to raise the minimum wage over three years, instead supporting a two-year time-table for an increase. Herman also opposed the legislation as it included tax cuts without offsets.

Among Herman's responsibilities as secretary was the enforcement of child labor laws. During her tenure, the Department of Labor fined toy store chain Toys "R" Us $200,000 for violating laws restricting the type of work that may be done, and the number of hours that may be worked by underage employees. It found more than 300 teenage employees were working more and later hours than permitted, and Toys "R" Us agreed to stop the practices.

Herman supported the United States' participation in the International Labor Organization's Child Labor Convention, a treaty designed to protect children under 18 years old from slavery, trafficking, bondage, and other abuses. She also defended the United States' support of a provision to allow for voluntary military service of those under 18 years old, a practice allowed in the United States, Great Britain, Germany, and the Netherlands. Opponents, including other nations, trade unions, and Amnesty International urged tougher provisions; however, Herman contended the focus of the treaty should be on forced labor, not voluntary military service.

Attorney General Janet Reno appointed Independent Counsel Ralph I. Lancaster Jr., in May 1998, to investigate Herman after businessman Laurent J. Yene alleged she accepted kickbacks while working at the White House. Reno was skeptical of Yene's allegations following a preliminary FBI investigation, but she believed the law obligated her to appoint independent counsel where she could not affirm the claims were without merit. Following a twenty-three month investigation, Independent Counsel Lancaster concluded that Herman had broken no laws and cleared her of all wrongdoing. She was the fifth Clinton cabinet officer to be investigated by independent counsel, and the fourth cleared of all wrongdoing. The Independent Counsel investigations of the cabinet members cost $95 million and did not uncover any felonies, leading Congress to allow the Independent Counsel Act to expire in June 1999 without re-authorization.

Herman was active in Al Gore's 2000 campaign for president. During the Florida election recount, Herman was part of the team planning a transition to a Gore Administration. ABC News and The New York Times considered her a likely candidate to remain in Gore's White House if he won. Elaine Chao replaced her as Secretary of Labor in the George W. Bush administration.

=== Post-government ===
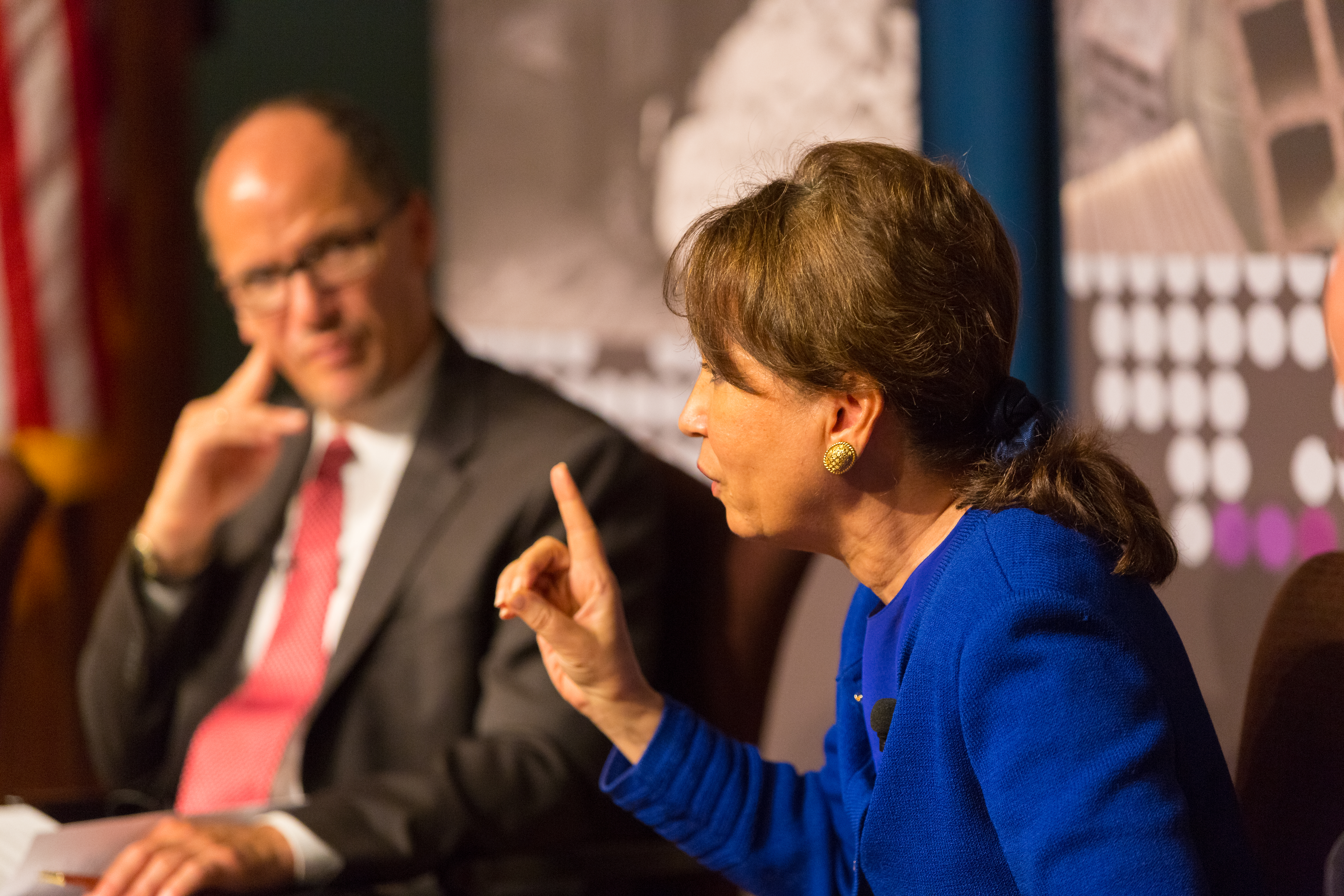
Thomas Perez and Alexis Herman participate in a round table discussion of the U.S. Department of Labor's 2012 findings on forced labor and human trafficking, September 30, 2013

Herman served as co-chair of Democratic presidential nominee John Kerry's transition team during the 2004 presidential election. In 2005, Howard Dean, serving as Democratic National Committee Chairman, appointed Herman and lawyer James Roosevelt, Jr. co-chairs of its Rules and Bylaws Committee. The position put Herman and Roosevelt at the center of a dispute between the campaigns of democratic primary candidates Barack Obama and Hillary Clinton over whether to seat delegates from Michigan and Florida at the 2008 Democratic National Convention. Herman endorsed Hillary Clinton in the 2016 Democratic Party Presidential primaries and served as Deputy Parliamentarian at the 2016 Democratic National Convention.

From 2001 to 2006, Herman was chairwoman of The Coca-Cola Company's Human Resources Task Force. The following year, Coca-Cola made her a director. Herman served on Toyota's Diversity Advisory Board. In 2006, the company appointed her to head a special task force to ensure the company's compliance with anti-discrimination standards following the resignation of Toyota North America's CEO, after being named the defendant in a sexual harassment lawsuit. Herman served on the boards of other major companies, including Cummins, MGM Resorts International, Entergy, Sodexo, and was the chairman and CEO of New Ventures, Inc.

In 2010, Herman was appointed to the board of the Clinton Bush Haiti Fund, a charitable organization founded by Bill Clinton and George W. Bush to aid Haiti following a magnitude 7.0 M_{w} earthquake in January of that year. Herman was also involved with civic groups including the National Urban League and the National Epilepsy Foundation.

== Honors ==
Herman was awarded more than 30 honorary doctorate degrees from academic institutions. In 1994, she received an honorary degree from her alma mater, Xavier University, and served as the commencement speaker.

== Personal life and death ==
Herman was Queen of Carnival for the Mobile Area Mardi Gras Association in 1974. Her father had served as King of Carnival in his youth.

Herman married physician Charles Franklin Jr. in February 2000 at the Washington National Cathedral. Franklin had three children from previous marriages. He died in 2014 following an extended illness.

Herman, throughout her career, worked closely with her mentor and close friend, civil rights icon Dr. Dorothy I. Height, and with the National Council of Negro Women.

Herman died in Washington, D.C. on April 25, 2025, at the age of 77.

Xavier University established The Alexis Herman ’69 Memorial Fund to honor her legacy.

== See also ==
- List of Black-American firsts
- List of Black-American United States Cabinet members
- List of female United States Cabinet members

Political offices
Preceded by Cecile B. Kremer	Director of the Office of Public Liaison; 1993–1997	Succeeded by Maria Echaveste
Preceded by Robert Reich	United States Secretary of Labor; 1997–2001	Succeeded by Elaine Chao
