= Naval Station Galveston =

Former United States Naval station

Naval Station Galveston (also referred to as Naval Station Lake Galveston) was a planned United States Navy installation located near Galveston, Texas. It was part of the Strategic Homeport initiative during the 1980s under the administration of President Ronald Reagan. The station was intended to support the Navy's proposed 600-ship Navy plan, but it was never completed and was recommended for closure under the 1988 Base Realignment and Closure Commission (BRAC).

== History ==
Naval Station Galveston was conceived as part of the Strategic Homeport program announced in 1985 by Secretary of the Navy John Lehman. The program aimed to disperse naval forces across multiple ports to reduce vulnerability to Soviet targeting, maintain battle group integrity, and stimulate local economies through military construction. Galveston was selected as one of six new homeports, alongside locations such as Naval Station Everett and Naval Station Ingleside. Congress appropriated over $28 million for the Galveston facility during fiscal years 1987 and 1988.

The proposed site was near Fort Point on Galveston Island, adjacent to the entrance of Galveston Bay. Plans called for stationing a Surface Action Group that included the battleship USS Wisconsin (BB-64) and five escort vessels. The development was projected to cost under $70 million and create thousands of construction and civilian jobs in the Houston–Galveston area.

== Closure ==
By 1988, the Navy faced significant budget constraints and a declining fleet size, which made new homeports unnecessary. The Base Realignment and Closure Commission recommended canceling construction at Galveston, citing high costs and lack of strategic necessity. Secretary of Defense Frank Carlucci adopted the recommendations in January 1989, and his successor Dick Cheney extended a moratorium on most military construction later that year. The General Accounting Office reported that the program exceeded cost estimates by $200 million and was behind schedule.

Naval Station Galveston was officially closed under the 1988 BRAC round, and property disposal was completed by 1991.

== Impact on Galveston ==
Although the station was never operational, its planning phase generated local debate and expectations of economic growth. The cancellation reflected broader post-Cold War defense reductions and marked a shift away from large-scale naval expansion. Today, Galveston retains a strong maritime heritage, including the Galveston Naval Museum at Seawolf Park, which preserves historic vessels such as USS Cavalla (SS-244) and USS Stewart (DE-238).

== See also ==
- Strategic Homeport
- Base Realignment and Closure
- Naval Station Ingleside
- Naval Station Everett
