= Cecile B. Kremer =

American political advisor

Cecile Kremer

11th Director of the Office of Public Liaison
- In office April 6, 1992 – January 20, 1993
- President: George H. W. Bush
- Preceded by: Bobbie Kilberg
- Succeeded by: Alexis Herman

Personal details
- Party: Republican
- Spouse: Gene Goldenberg
- Education: University of Maryland, College Park (BA)

Cecile B. Kremer is an American political advisor who has worked for United States Presidents Ronald Reagan, George H.W. Bush and George W. Bush. She has also held senior positions with trade and non-profit associations.

== Career ==
Kremer was a staff assistant to President Reagan, serving as an advance representative in the Office of Presidential Advance from 1981 until 1985. She served as Deputy Assistant Secretary for Public Liaison at the U.S. Department of the Treasury from 1985 to 1988. During the 1988 Presidential campaign she served as deputy tour director for Senator Dan Quayle and became his director of scheduling and advance during the transition a position she held until April 1991, when she became Deputy Director of the Office of Public Liaison. Upon the resignation of Bobbie Kilberg, Kremer was promoted to head the office.

In 1992, she was appointed to the U.S. Holocaust Memorial Council by President George H.W. Bush. In 1993, she was named Vice President for Government Affairs for the Plumbing Manufacturers Institute, a national trade group representing the makers of plumbing fixtures and equipment.

After the election of George W. Bush in 2000, Kremer joined the management team at the U.S. Environmental Protection Agency under then-Administrator Christine Todd Whitman. She served in a number of key positions, eventually becoming the Deputy Chief of staff, a position she held from 2002 until 2008.

Upon leaving United States Environmental Protection Agency in 2009, she operated her own consulting firm until she was named Vice President for Federal Affairs at the Humane Society of the United States/

== Personal life ==
Ms. Kremer is married to Gene Goldenberg, has one son, Joshua, and resides in Arlington County, Virginia.

Political offices
Preceded by Bobbie Kilberg	Director of the Office of Public Liaison; 1992–1993	Succeeded by Alexis Herman
