= West Trenton, New Jersey =

Populated place in Mercer County, New Jersey, US

- Unincorporated community
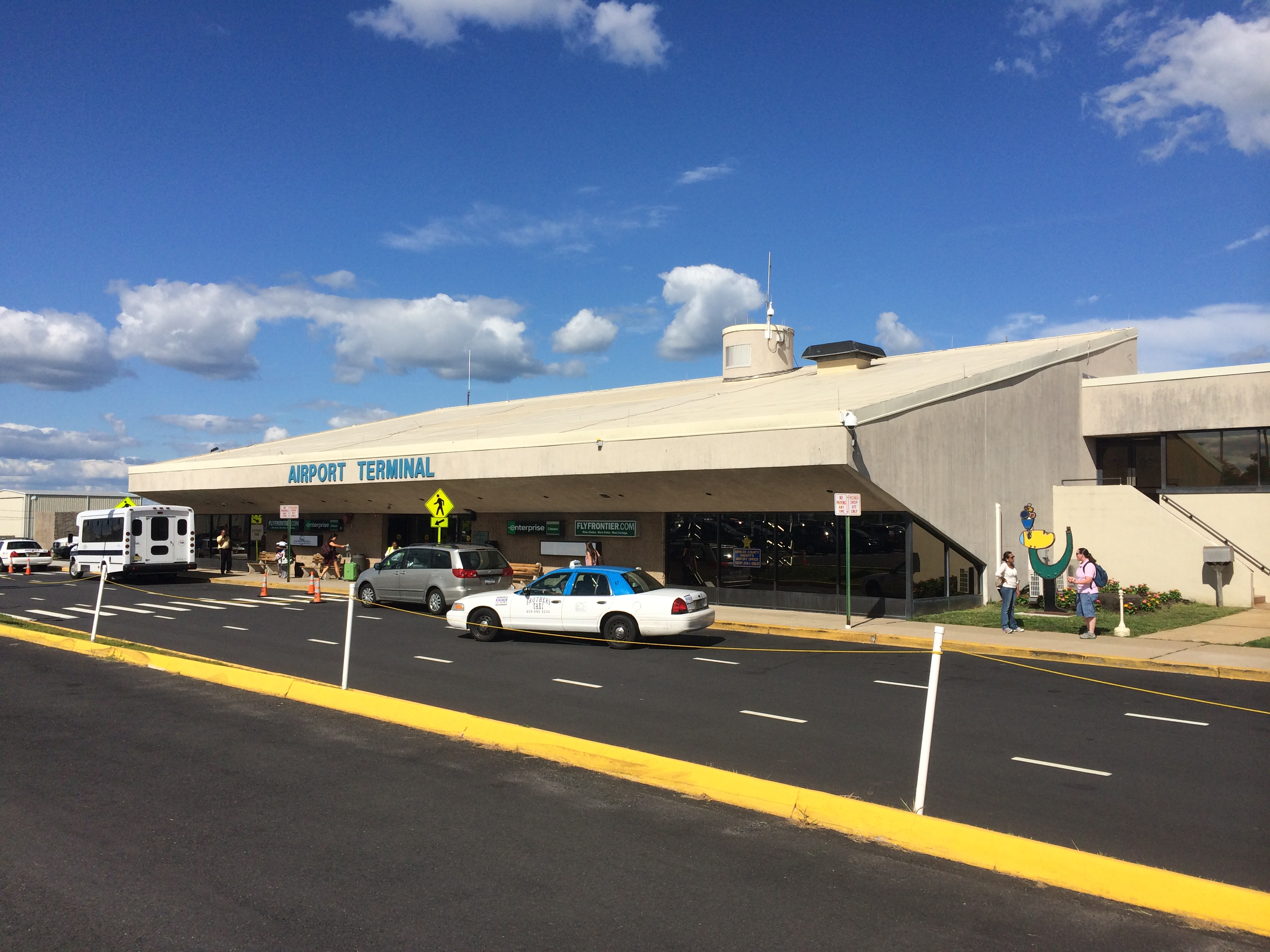
- The Trenton-Mercer Airport (IATA: TTN) in the West Trenton neighborhood of Ewing Township, New Jersey is a shared civilian-military airport.

- Location of West Trenton in Mercer County Inset: Location of county within the state of New Jersey West Trenton (New Jersey) West Trenton (the United States)
- Coordinates: 40°15′50″N 74°49′07″W
- Country: United States
- State: New Jersey
- County: Mercer
- Township: Ewing
- Elevation: 164 ft (50 m)
- GNIS feature ID: 881731

West Trenton is an unincorporated community within Ewing Township in Mercer County, New Jersey, United States. It is a suburban area located adjacent to the northwestern portion of the city of Trenton, from which it derives its name. Located at the intersection of Bear Tavern Road/Grand Avenue and West Upper Ferry Road, it is one of the oldest settlements in Ewing Township.

== History ==
The community was known as Birmingham and then Trenton Junction before adopting its current name. Today, West Trenton is primarily a residential neighborhood consisting of a mixture of detached, single-family homes and semi-attached, half-duplexes, the majority of which were built from the early 1900s through the 1950s.

== Points of interest ==
West Trenton is home to the New Jersey State Police Headquarters, Trenton–Mercer Airport, Trenton Country Club, New Jersey Manufacturers Insurance Company, The Homasote Company, The Marie H. Katzenbach School for the Deaf, and the nearby Villa Victoria Academy, a Catholic primary and secondary school for girls. Religious institutions include Our Lady of Good Counsel Church (Roman Catholic), West Trenton Presbyterian Church, and Calvary Chapel of Mercer County (Evangelical). Interstate 295 is just northwest of the community and is linked to it by Bear Tavern Road. West Trenton Train Station is the outermost stop on the SEPTA Regional Rail West Trenton Line.

West Trenton was the site of the General Motors Inland Fisher Guide Plant owned by its Fisher Body division. During World War II, the TBM version of the Grumman TBF Avenger torpedo bomber was produced here for the United States Navy. Women were employed to fly the bombers from the nearby airport to their deployment sites. The facility was demolished and the site is awaiting final environmental remediation and redevelopment.

The Naval Air Warfare Center Trenton operated on a 528-acre (214 ha) site in West Trenton from 1953 to 1997.

== Education ==
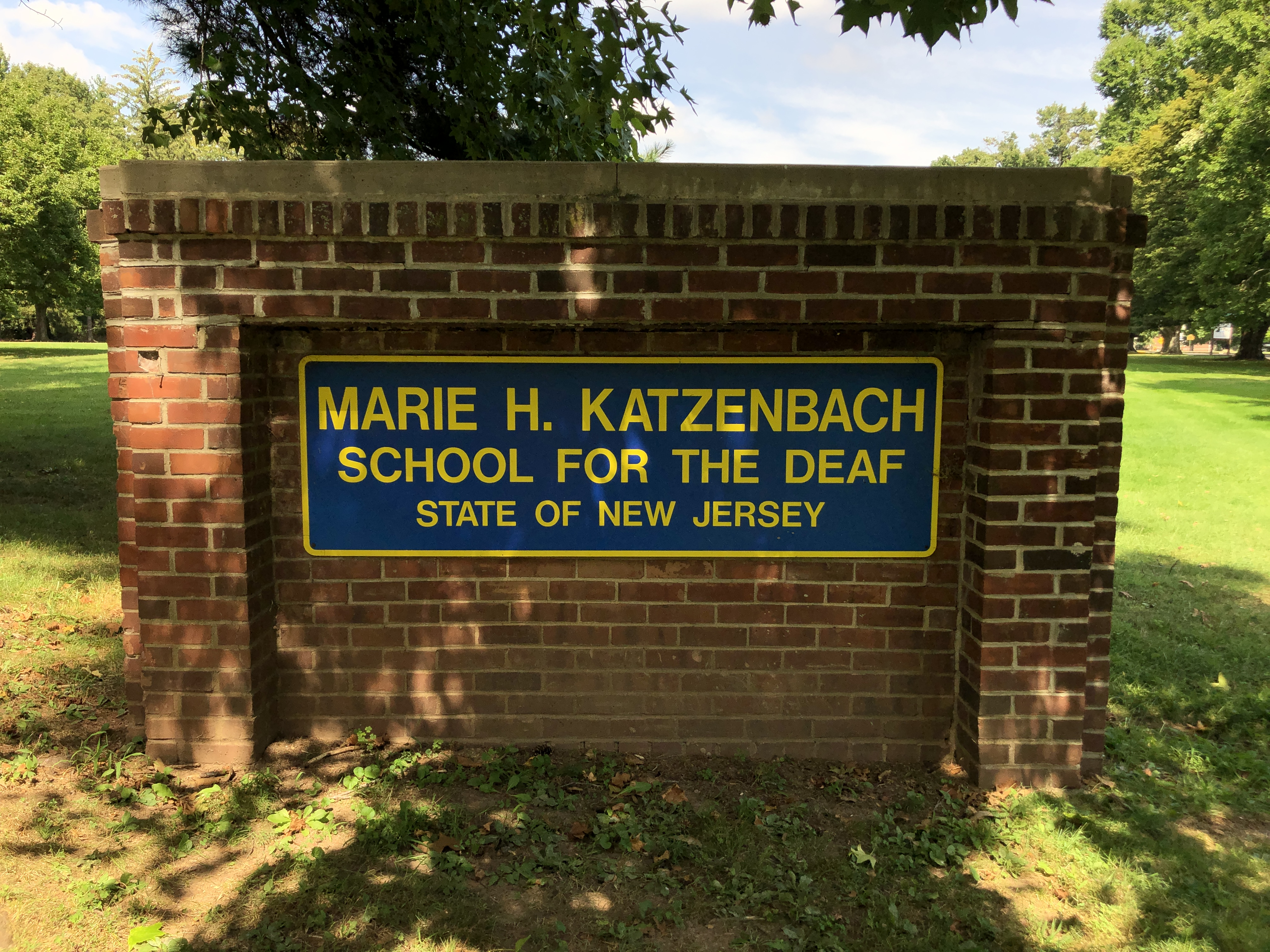
Marie H. Katzenbach School for the Deaf entrance

As of other parts of the township it is a part of Ewing Public Schools, served by Ewing High School.

Marie H. Katzenbach School for the Deaf, a statewide school, opened in West Trenton in 1923.

Villa Victoria Academy is in West Trenton.
