= 1995 Base Realignment and Closure Commission =

United States military commission

The 1995 Base Realignment and Closure Commission preliminary list was released by the United States Department of Defense in 1995 as part of the Base Realignment and Closure Commission. It recommended closing 32 major United States military bases.

== Commissioners ==
- Alan J. Dixon, Chairman
- Alton W. Cornella
- Rebecca G. Cox
- James B. Davis, USAF (Ret.)
- S. Lee Kling
- RADM Benjamin F. Montoya, USN (Ret.)
- MG Josue Robles, Jr., USA (Ret.)
- Wendi L. Steele

== Justification ==
Over the past 57 years military base closures have taken place though various processes. The Secretary of Defense implemented closures on an ad-hoc basis during 1961 - 1979. Individual service Chiefs and Congress strengthened its veto power for closures during 1980 to 1987. These changes lead to a few major bases being closed and none actually being closed. This being an issue, Congress finally granted authority to an independent Defense Base Closure and Realignment (BRAC) commission to work with the Department of Defense (DoD) to identify bases and installations to the executive and legislative branches for closure or realignment between 1988 and 1995. The BRAC had to responsibility of selecting which bases were to close throughout four rounds of base closures. Even though these BRAC actions represented a large amount of physical reductions in installations and associated units, the DoD continued to request more infrastructure cuts to offset reduced congressional funding for defense. Additional BRAC rounds were requested by the United States Department of Defense (DoD) because there continues to be a significant disparity between support structure capacity versus the number of units and associated military personnel levels. Congress however delayed providing additional BRAC legislation until the fall/winter of 2002.

DoD had reported to Congress that billions of dollars could be saved annually if excess base infrastructure could be eliminated .

All three of the BRAC rounds of the 1990s (1991, 1993, and 1995) were authorized under the same law, Public Law 101-510.

== Recommendations ==
Major facilities slated for closure included:

- Bergstrom Air Force Base
- Camp Bonneville
- Castle Air Force Base
- Fitzsimons Army Medical Center
- Fort Chaffee
- Fort Greely
- Fort Indiantown Gap
- Fort McClellan
- Fort Pickett
- Fort Ritchie
- Kelly Air Force Base
- Letterkenny Army Depot
- Mare Island Naval Shipyard
- McClellan Air Force Base
- Military Ocean Terminal at Bayonne
- Naval Air Facility Adak
- Naval Air Station South Weymouth
- Naval Air Warfare Center Aircraft Division, Warminster
- Naval Air Warfare Center, Aircraft Division, Indianapolis
- Naval Shipyard, Long Beach
- Naval Supply Center, Oakland
- Naval Surface Warfare Center Crane Division
- Naval Surface Warfare Center Dahlgren Division
- Oakland Army Base
- Ontario Air National Guard Station
- Red River Army Depot
- Reese Air Force Base
- Roslyn Air National Guard Station
- Savanna Army Depot Activity
- Seneca Army Depot
- Ship Repair Facility, Guam
- Sierra Army Depot
- Stratford Army Engine Plant

== See also ==
- Loss of Strength Gradient
