= Bobbie Kilberg =

American political advisor

10th Director of the Office of Public Liaison
- In office January 20, 1989 – April 6, 1992
- President: George H. W. Bush
- Preceded by: Rebecca Range
- Succeeded by: Cecile Kremer

Personal details
- Born: Barbara Greene; October 25, 1944 (age 81) New York City, New York, U.S.
- Party: Republican
- Spouse: Bill Kilberg
- Children: 5
- Education: Vassar College (AB); Columbia University (MA); Yale University (JD)

Bobbie Kilberg (born Barbara Greene; October 25, 1944) is an American political advisor who has worked for Presidents Richard Nixon, Gerald Ford, George H. W. Bush, and George W. Bush. Kilberg has served as the president and CEO of the Northern Virginia Technology Council since 1998. She was briefly an attorney with the Washington law firm of Arnold & Porter from 1971 to 1973. She served on the staff of President Richard Nixon's United States Domestic Policy Council, under President Gerald Ford as Associate Counsel, and for President George H.W. Bush as Deputy Assistant to the President for Public Liaison and director of the White House Office of Intergovernmental Affairs.

== Career ==
Bobbie Kilberg was president and CEO of the Northern Virginia Technology Council, a position she started in September 1998 and retired in 2020.

As a White House Fellow, she served on the staff of President Nixon's Domestic Policy Council. From 1971 to 1973, she was an attorney with the Washington law firm of Arnold & Porter then vice president for academic affairs at Mount Vernon College. In 1971, Kilberg was elected to the Common Cause National Governing Board. In 1975 she return to the White House as associate counsel to the president under Gerald Ford.

Kilberg directed a project on the future of private philanthropy at the Aspen Institute beginning in 1978 then she moved to the Roosevelt Center for American Policy Studies in 1982 as vice president and general counsel.

She held two consecutive positions for President George H.W. Bush, as Deputy Assistant to the President for Public Liaison and as director of the White House Office of Intergovernmental Affairs.

In December 2001, she was appointed by President George W. Bush to serve as a member of the President's Council of Advisors on Science and Technology during his term in office.

In Virginia, Bobbie Kilberg has served on the Speaker's Citizens Advisory Committee on Legislative Compensation, on the Joint Judicial Advisory Committee for the merit selection of judges, on the Attorney General's Task Forces on Identity Theft, Regulatory Reform and Economic Development, and Youth Internet Safety, and on the Governor's Northern Virginia BRAC Working Group. In November 2009, Governor Bob McDonnell named her as one of the five Co-Chairs of his Transition Team. In May 2010, she was named to the Governor's Commission on Government Reform and Restructuring and, in August 2010, she was named to the Governor's Commission on Military and National Security Facilities.

Kilberg has sought elected political office twice in Virginia, in 1987 as the Republican candidate for the State Senate and in 1993 as a candidate for the Republican nomination for Lieutenant Governor.

Kilberg retired from her position at the Northern Virginia Tech Council in 2020.

== Personal life ==
Kilberg resides in McLean, Virginia with her husband, Bill, a senior partner and member of the executive committee of the law firm of Gibson, Dunn & Crutcher LLP. They have five children and sixteen grandchildren.

Political offices
Preceded by Rebecca Range	Director of the Office of Public Liaison; 1989–1992	Succeeded by Cecile Kremer
