= Strategic Homeport =

1980s US Navy plan for construction of new bases in continental US

Strategic Homeport was a plan developed in the 1980s by Secretary of the Navy John Lehman for building new U.S. Navy bases within the continental United States. It was proposed as part of the 600-ship Navy plan of the Reagan Administration. It called for the construction of new ports for existing and newly commissioned ships. The plan was based on five strategic principles:

1. force dispersal to complicate Soviet targeting
2. battlegroup integrity
3. wider industrial base utilization
4. logistics suitability
5. geographic considerations such as reduced transit times to likely operating areas

The program was devised in part to achieve a political goal: to build support for the naval expansion program though the promise of new naval bases.

The program enjoyed broad support both in Congress and in the Reagan Administration.

== Stations ==
Stations opened under the program include:

- Naval Station Everett, Everett, Washington
- Naval Station Galveston, Galveston, Texas
- Naval Station Ingleside, Ingleside, Texas
- Naval Station Lake Charles, Lake Charles, Louisiana
- Naval Station Mobile, Mobile, Alabama
- Naval Station New York, Staten Island, New York
- Naval Station Pascagoula, Pascagoula, Mississippi
