= Alex Herman =

American baseball player

- Outfielder
- Born: May 10, 1899; Mobile, Alabama, U.S.
- Died: December 13, 1975 (aged 76); Mobile, Alabama, U.S.
- Threw: Right

Negro league baseball debut
- 1932, for the Memphis Red Sox

Last appearance
- 1932, for the Memphis Red Sox

Teams
- Memphis Red Sox (1932)

Alexander Leo Herman (May 10, 1899 – December 13, 1975) was an American baseball outfielder of the Negro league in the 1920s and 1930s, who was the scout who discovered Baseball Hall of Famer Satchel Paige. He would later become the first African American elected official in Alabama since the 19th century.

== Biography ==
A native of Mobile, Alabama, Herman attended Tuskegee University.

While playing and scouting for the Chattanooga Black Lookouts in 1925, Herman discovered Satchel Paige, a younger player who had a hometown connection to Herman from Mobile. Herman himself went on to play for the Memphis Red Sox in 1932.

He later became active in Democratic party politics, eventually being elected to the Mobile County Democratic Committee. This made him the first African American elected official in the state of Alabama since Reconstruction. He actively encouraged voter participation among other African Americans.

He was also active in the Knights of Peter Claver, the Benevolent and Protective Order of Elks, the YMCA, and helped invigorate Mardi Gras celebrations among Blacks in the area, founding the Mobile Area Mardi Gras Association, the oldest Black Carnival group in the city.

He died in Mobile in 1975 at age 76.

== Personal life ==
A devout Catholic, Herman was a parishioner of Most Pure Heart of Mary Catholic Church and was a member of its Holy Name Society.

He had one son, Kirk, and his daughter Alexis (1947-2025) became the United States Secretary of Labor under President Bill Clinton.
