= Naval Station Mobile =

Former US Navy base in Alabama

Coordinates: 30°31′46.05″N 88°5′26.59″W

- Mobile, Alabama

Site information
- Type: United States Navy station

Naval Station Mobile is a former station of the United States Navy. It opened in 1985 during the creation of the Strategic Homeport program under the administration of President Ronald Reagan. In 1991, the homeport was closed, as part of declining funding under the Base Realignment and Closure Commission (1989).
