= Naval Air Warfare Center Trenton =

United States Navy facility (1953–1997)

- Part of United States Navy
- Ewing, Mercer County, New Jersey, United States
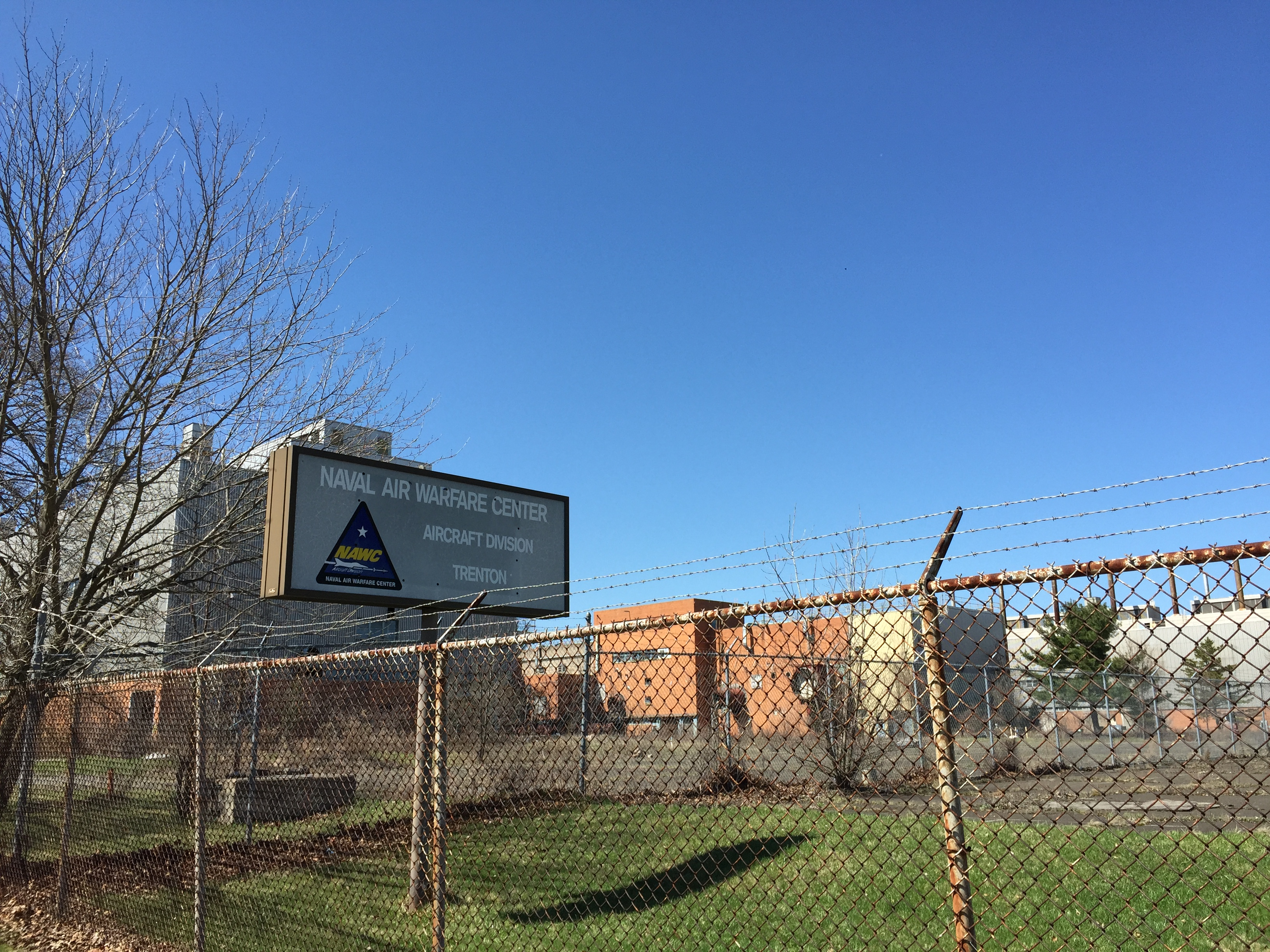
- As of 2015, Naval Air Warfare Center Trenton still appeared nearly untouched by time, 18 years after closing in 1997

Site information
- Type: Naval Air Warfare Center
- Controlled by: Navy

Location
- Location within the state of New Jersey
- Coordinates: 40°16′06″N 74°48′47″W

Site history
- In use: 1953–1997

Naval Air Warfare Center Trenton is the former site of United States Navy facility in the West Trenton section of Ewing Township, New Jersey, just outside the city of Trenton. Opened during the final year of the Korean War in 1953, the center encompassed 528 acres (214 ha) on Parkway Avenue in Ewing, directly adjacent to the Trenton–Mercer Airport. It was used as a jet engine test facility for the US Navy until its closure per recommendations of the 1993 Base Closure and Realignment Commission, due to Navy decision making under President George H. W. Bush. Nearly 700 civilian positions were lost, most of which were relocated to other facilities in Maryland and Tennessee. The base's Marine operations were transferred to Fort Dix, which has since become Joint Base McGuire-Dix-Lakehurst. HomeFront, a charity to end homelessness, acquired the "decommissioned Marine Reserve Center" on the 8.5 acre base at no cost in October 2013 in a process involving the United States Department of Defense, the United States Department of Housing and Urban Development, Mercer County and Ewing Township.
