= Tacony Warehouse =

Coordinates: 40°1′12.91″N 75°2′11.60″W

The Tacony Warehouse was a storage facility located in Philadelphia, Pennsylvania that was targeted for closure as part of the 1988 Base Realignment and Closure Commission. Situated on 14.2 acres with eleven buildings, the structure was originally used as storage for nearby Fort Dix in New Jersey. The site is also a Superfund site, due to nearby groundwater contamination.
