= Pontiac Storage Facility =

Coordinates: 42°37′25.62″N 83°15′14.01″W

The Pontiac Storage Facility is a former storage facility of the United States Army that stored equipment for the Detroit Arsenal located in Pontiac, Michigan. It was closed as part of the 1988 Base Realignment and Closure Commission.
