= Naval Aviation Depot Pensacola =

Historic US Navy installation in Florida

- Part of United States Navy

Location
- Coordinates: 30°21′09″N 87°19′04″W

Naval Aviation Depot Pensacola is a former United States Navy aviation depot which was located at Naval Air Station Pensacola, Florida, until it was closed by the 1993 Base Realignment and Closure Commission.

== History ==
From the earliest days of naval aviation at NAS Pensacola, an aircraft maintenance facility operated at the air station. Initially known as the Construction and Repair Department, in 1923 it was redesignated an Assembly and Repair Department, and in 1948 to the Overhaul and Repair Department. In 1967, the status of the facility at NAS Pensacola and at five other Navy and one Marine Corps air stations were changed to that of separate commands, each called a Naval Air Rework Facility and directed to report to the Commander of the Naval Air Systems Command instead of the air station commanding officer. Former seaplane hangars along the south edge of the air station, as well as a large structure at Chevalier Field were utilized for aircraft overhauls, and Pensacola was a designated as an A-4 Skyhawk rework site.

In 1987 the name Naval Aviation Depot replaced the name Naval Air Rework Facility to more accurately reflect the range of their activities. Three Naval Aviation Depots were closed under the 1993 BRAC Committee recommendations including that at NAS Pensacola, and most of the buildings on the air station involved in these tasks razed.
