= NJM Insurance Group =

Property-casualty insurance company

- Formerly: New Jersey Manufacturers Casualty Insurance Company
- Type: Mutual
- Industry: Insurance
- Founded: June 7, 1913
- Headquarters: West Trenton, New Jersey, United States
- Number of locations: 3 offices (West Trenton, Hammonton, Parsippany)
- Key people: Carol L. Voorhees (President & Chief Executive Officer); Kate Ro (Senior Vice President & General Counsel); Kenny Betkowski (Senior Vice President & Chief Financial Officer)
- Number of employees: ~2,500
- Website: www.njm.com

NJM Insurance Group is an American mutual insurance group of companies, offering personal auto, commercial auto, workers' compensation, homeowners, condo, renters, and umbrella insurance. It is headquartered in the West Trenton section of Ewing Township, New Jersey, and serves markets in Connecticut, Delaware, Maryland, New Jersey, New York, Ohio, and Pennsylvania.

== History ==
NJM Insurance Group, originally known as New Jersey Manufacturers Casualty Insurance Company, formed as a workers’ compensation insurance company on June 7, 1913, two years after New Jersey passed the Workmen's Compensation Act which required all employers to carry insurance coverage for injured workers. The company's original goal was to provide cost-effective, safety-conscious, and financially secure insurance to New Jersey business owners. By 1922, the company was the largest provider of workers’ compensation insurance in New Jersey.

In 1921, NJM began providing insurance for property loss, commercial auto accidents, private automobiles, and homes.

On January 1, 1965, the New Jersey Manufacturers Indemnity Insurance Company (founded as the New Jersey Manufacturers Fire Insurance Company on December 6, 1921) merged into the New Jersey Manufacturers Casualty Insurance Company to form the current legal entity. The merger had been announced on April 24 of the prior year, with approval being granted by the Commissioner of Insurance on October 28.

NJM's main office has been in West Trenton since 1966. Personal Lines and Commercial Lines Underwriting, General Claims and Medical Services Administration are headquartered there, as are most support services for company operations. NJM has had additional offices in northern New Jersey since the 1950s, but the company's main North Jersey branch has been consolidated in Parsippany since 1996. The southern New Jersey branch opened in Hammonton in 2000.

In 2015, American soccer player and long-time NJM policyholder Carli Lloyd was announced as the company's spokesperson. This partnership ended after Lloyd's retirement in 2021.

In 2018, NJM expanded its services to Pennsylvania residents.

In 2019, services were expanded into Connecticut, with Ohio, Delaware, and Maryland following in 2021.

In 2021, NJM introduced its businessowners policy and commercial excess and umbrella insurance for businesses in New Jersey. Later that year, these products started being offered in Delaware, Pennsylvania, and Maryland. In 2024, NJM expanded eligibility to businesses in Connecticut.

In 2022, NJM introduced a commercial package policy for mid-sized and large businesses.

== Products and services ==
=== Personal insurance ===
NJM provides auto, homeowners, renters, condo, and umbrella insurance to residents of New Jersey, Pennsylvania, Connecticut, Ohio, and Maryland. NJM partners with American Modern Insurance Group to offer coverage for motorcycles, ATVs, boats, and collector cars.

=== Commercial insurance ===
The company originally formed to provide workers' compensation insurance to businesses in New Jersey.

As of 2025, it writes workers' compensation, commercial auto insurance, businessowners policy, commercial package policy, and commercial excess and umbrella coverage in Connecticut, Delaware, Maryland, New Jersey, and Pennsylvania. The company provides New York businesses with workers' compensation and commercial auto insurance.

== Consumer safety ==
NJM runs several Teen Driver Safety Programs, which bring safety programming and education to New Jersey schools. In 2013, NJM commemorated its centennial with a "DNT TXT N DRV" (Don't Text and Drive) campaign. The company donated $50,000 to charity at the conclusion of the campaign, which marked the start of NJM's Teen Driver Safety Programs.

Since 2013, NJM has donated more than 60 driving simulators to New Jersey and Pennsylvania high schools to support safe driving.

== Partnerships and sponsorships ==
=== Trenton Thunder ===
NJM partners with the Trenton Thunder for their "Safe at Home" Program. The program designates $50 per run scored at Thunder home games through the season and playoffs to a local charity organization. Since 2012, this partnership has resulted in donations of more than $140,600.

=== Somerset Patriots ===
NJM partnered with the Somerset Patriots to sponsor the Ballpark BBQ section of TD Bank Ballpark in Bridgewater, New Jersey.

=== Philadelphia 76ers ===
Since 2018, NJM has partnered with the Philadelphia 76ers to promote teen driving safety in Pennsylvania. In 2018 and 2019, the Sixers and NJM hosted a National Teen Driver Safety Week kick-off event at the Wells Fargo Center in Philadelphia.

=== Philadelphia Union ===
In 2019, NJM became the Official Automotive Insurance Partner of the Philadelphia Union.

=== Cleveland Browns ===
In 2024, the Cleveland Browns announced NJM's first formal partnership with a professional football team.

== Recognition and awards ==
- AM Best Company financial strength rating: A+ (Superior rating), and Financial Size Category: XV. As of 2010, NJM's Best rating has been "A" or better every year except for a "C" rating in 1933.
- NJM was the first company to receive J.D. Power’s Personal Auto Claims Certification in 2018. In 2021 and 2025, J.D. Power ranked NJM Insurance Company #1 for overall satisfaction in the Mid-Atlantic region in its U.S. Auto Insurance Study. In 2024, NJM ranked #1 nationally in J.D. Power’s Auto Claims Satisfaction Study.
- Forbes included NJM on its list of America’s Best Employers by State in 2025 and Best Midsize Employers in 2023.
- In 2016, NJM was the New Jersey State Governor’s Jefferson Award Honoree for its corporate giving program.
- The National Safety Council awarded NJM with the Teen Driver Safety Leadership Award in 2016, recognizing the Teen Driver Safety Program for its demonstrated results in changing behaviors and attitudes in young drivers and reducing teen crashes, injuries, and deaths.
- In 2019, PR Daily awarded NJM the Corporate Social Responsibility Award for Public Health or Safety Initiative for the Teen Driver Safety Program.
- From 2022 to 2024, NJM Insurance Group was named as a Ward’s 50 Company by Ward, a business unit of Aon plc.
