= Naval Air Warfare Center, Indianapolis =

Former U.S. Navy facility in Indianapolis, Indiana

Coordinates: 39.7945°N 86.0602°W

- Part of United States Navy
- Indianapolis, Marion County, Indiana, U.S.

Site information
- Type: Naval Air Warfare Center
- Controlled by: Navy

Location
- Location within the state of Indiana

Site history
- Built: 1941–1942
- In use: 1942–1996

Naval Air Warfare Center, Indianapolis (NAWC) is a former United States Navy facility in Warren Township, Indianapolis, Indiana, U.S. The plant opened in 1942, covering 1,000,000 square feet (93,000 m^{2}) and employing some 3,000 in avionics research and development. The facility was closed in 1996 following recommendations from the 1995 Base Realignment and Closure Commission. As of 2022, the facility is privately owned by Vertex Aerospace and employs about 600.

== History ==
Naval Ordnance Plant, Indianapolis (NOP-I), as it was first called, was one of five inland sites selected in July 1940 by the United States Department of the Navy Bureau of Ordnance for the manufacture of naval ordnance. The other plants were located in Canton, Ohio; Center Line, Michigan; Louisville, Kentucky; and Macon, Georgia. Construction began in 1941 and the plant became fully operational in 1943. The $13.5 million ($236 million in 2024 dollars) facility was government-owned, contractor-operated (GOCO). Lukas–Harold Corporation, a subsidiary of the Norden Company, operated the plant manufacturing Norden bombsights until September 1945. The plant received the Army-Navy "E" Award in 1943, 1944, and 1945.

Following World War II, the site came under full control of the U.S. Navy and the plant continued its manufacturing and repair roles. The plant was renamed Naval Avionics Facility, Indianapolis (NAFI) in 1956, shifting its mission to avionics research and development for all military services. By 1977, the name was changed again to Naval Avionics Center, Indianapolis (NACI). Under its new name, the center designed and built prototype avionics, including electronic countermeasures, missile guidance technologies, and guided bombs. The facility's last name change occurred in 1992—Naval Air Warfare Center Aircraft Division Indianapolis.

On recommendation from the 1995 Base Realignment and Closure Commission, the site was closed in 1996 and transferred ownership to Hughes Electronics Corporation on January 1, 1997. It was the "largest full-scale privatization of a military facility in U.S. history" at the time. Later that year, Hughes Aircraft Company was acquired by Raytheon Company and the facility was renamed the Raytheon Analysis & Test Laboratory (RATL), operating as part of the company's Intelligence, Information and Services (IIS) business unit.

In December 2021, Madison, Mississippi-based Vertex Aerospace acquired the facility, now known as Vertex Technology & Training Solutions Division. In March 2022, Vertex announced a planned merger with Colorado Springs, Colorado-based Vectrus to be completed in the third quarter of 2022.

== See also ==
- Indiana Army Ammunition Plant
- Naval Ordnance Station Louisville
- Naval Surface Warfare Center Crane Division
