= Lexington Army Depot =

Former US military facility in Avon, Kentucky

Coordinates: 38°4′33.62″N 84°19′26″W

Lexington Army Depot is a former United States Army facility located in Avon, Kentucky. In 1964, it was paired with Blue Grass Army Depot to form Lexington-Blue Grass Army Depot. In 1999, the facility was closed after the recommendation of the 1988 Base Realignment and Closure Commission.
