= Naval Station New York =

US naval station in New York City

- Staten Island, New York
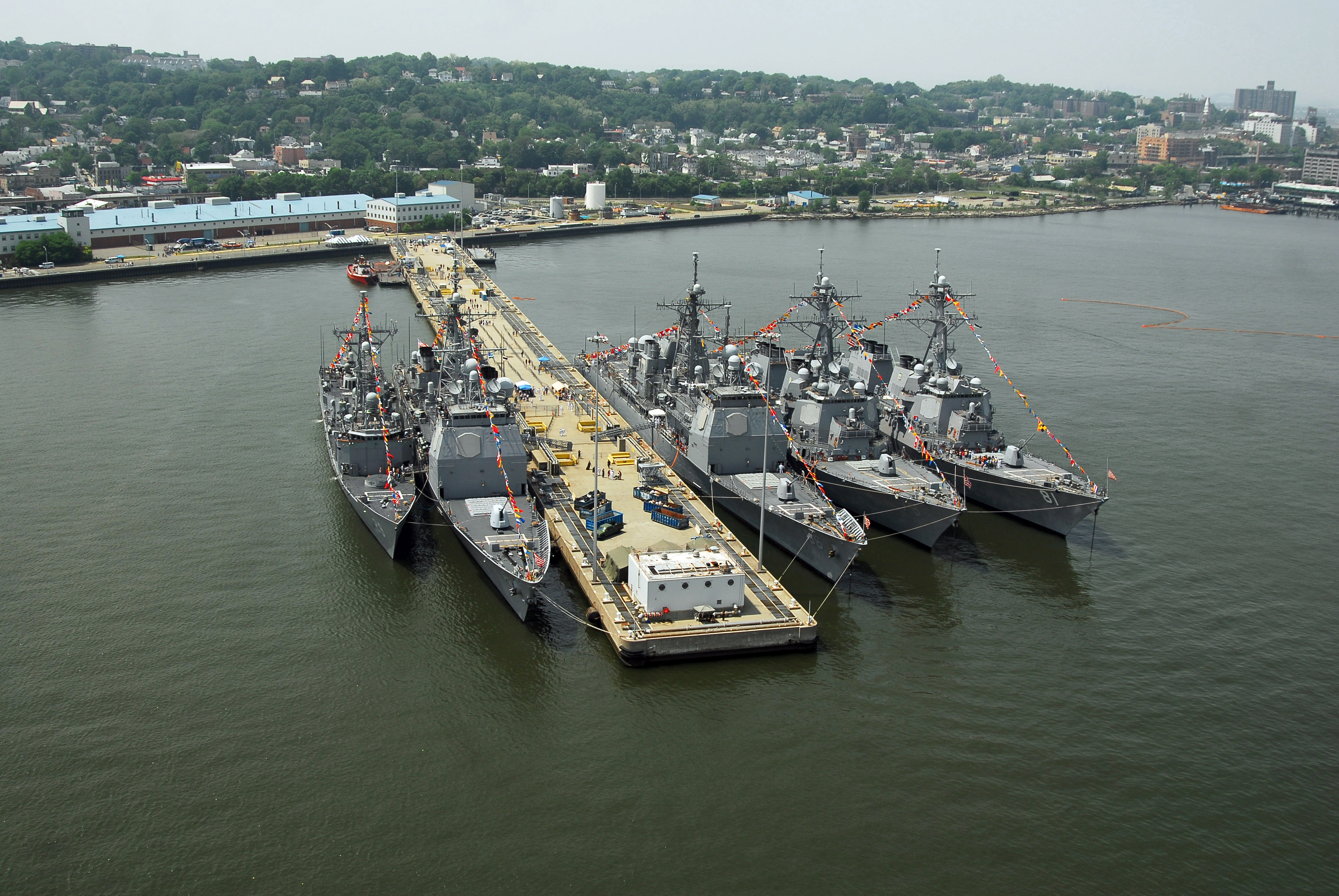
- Guided-missile frigate USS Stephen W. Groves (FFG 29), guided-missile cruisers USS Hue City (CG 66) and USS San Jacinto (CG 56), and guided-missile destroyers USS Oscar Austin (DDG 79) and USS Winston S. Churchill (DDG 81) tied up at the home port pier during Fleet Week in 2007.

Site information
- Type: U.S. naval station

Location
- Location within New York City Location within New York Location within the United States
- Coordinates: 40°37′49″N 74°4′23″W

Naval Station New York was a United States Navy Naval Station on Staten Island in New York City, closed in 1994.

Opened in 1990, it was part of the Reagan administration's Strategic Homeport program. The station had two sections: a Strategic Homeport in Stapleton where ships docked, and a larger section occupying Fort Wadsworth, where administrative offices and bachelor and family housing were located. Comprising about 266 acres (108 ha) with some 280,000 square feet (26,000 m^{2}) of office space, the naval station was also home to NAVRESSO, the Navy Resale and Services Support Office, commanded by Admiral Squibb. NAVRESSO later moved to Norfolk, Virginia.

A pier was built to accommodate the warships of a surface action group. The pier was later named for the Sullivan brothers. Ships that called the pier home included the frigates USS Bowen (FF-1079), USS Donald B. Beary (FF-1085), USS Ainsworth (FF-1090), and USS Oliver Hazard Perry (FFG-7) and at least one cruiser, the USS Normandy (CG-60). The base was to be the homeport of the battleship USS Iowa until an explosion in one of the ship's turrets led to the ship's decommissioning. The area is still known colloquially as The Homeport.

Naval Station New York (Staten Island) was recommended for closure under the 1993 Base Realignment and Closure Commission, as it was deemed too small, too expensive to house personnel, and made unnecessary with cuts to the Navy. It was closed in 1994. Fort Wadsworth was turned over to the Department of the Interior in 1995 and is administered as part of Gateway National Recreation Area. The Stapleton Pier area was turned over to the City of New York. The area around the pier is being converted into a mixed-use waterfront neighborhood called Stapleton Homeport. Ground was broken for the long-delayed project on June 20, 2013. A new station for the fire boat Fire Fighter II opened on the pier in 2012, and the pier is also still used by the Navy during New York City's annual Fleet Week celebrations.
