= New Orleans Military Ocean Terminal =

Former US Army logistics facility in New Orleans

Coordinates: 29.9605°N 90.0316°W

New Orleans Military Ocean Terminal (NOMOT) was a large military ocean terminal at New Orleans, Louisiana. It served as a transfer point between rail, trucks, and ships for the import and export of weapons, ammunition, explosives, and military equipment for the United States Army. It was located at 4400 Dauphine Street, New Orleans, Louisiana 70145, on the Mississippi River and Inner Harbor Navigation Canal, also called the Industrial Canal, the entrance to the Turning Basin in Bywater, New Orleans. New Orleans Military Ocean Terminal had three large warehouses at Dauphine Street and Poland Ave on the 25-acre site. New Orleans Military Ocean Terminal has 1.5 million square feet of floor space and a 5-story parking garage. The terminal was closed in September 2011, and ownership was transferred to the City of New Orleans in 2014.

The Ocean Terminal was built by the Army quartermaster depot for World War I and was fully completed in 1919. In World War II it was called the New Orleans Port of Embarkation. The Army transferred the depot to the US Navy in 1966 for Naval Support Activity New Orleans. The US Navy used it as a depot and national headquarters for the Navy Reserve and Marine Corps Reserve. The main building was called the F. Edward Hebert Defense Complex named for F. Edward Hebert a New Orleans congressman. Navy Reserve headquarters moved to Virginia, and many of the personnel moved to Tennessee. Other operations moved to Naval Air Station Joint Reserve Base New Orleans. The Marine Forces Reserve headquarters was moved to Algiers, New Orleans.

== See also ==
- U.S. Army Transportation Command
