= Naval Hospital Orlando =

Former US Navy hospital

- United States Navy

Geography
- Location: Orlando, Florida, United States
- Coordinates: 28.580°N 81.322°W

History
- Opened: 1968
- Closed: 1995

Links
- Lists: Hospitals in Florida

Naval Hospital Orlando is a former United States Navy hospital. The hospital was founded in 1968 when the Navy took over an Air Force facility. It was closed in 1995. The facility was transferred to the United States Department of Veterans Affairs as the Lake Baldwin VA Clinic.
