= Port Chicago =

Port Chicago can refer to:

- Port Chicago, California, former town in the United States
- Port Chicago disaster, deadly explosion that occurred at the Port Chicago Naval Magazine in Port Chicago, California on 17 July 1944, killing 320 people
- Port Chicago Naval Magazine National Memorial, at the site of the disaster
