= Deployment Support Command =

The Deployment Support Command is a military formation of the United States Army - United States Army Reserve.

Military Traffic Management Command (MTMC) saw continuous change in the 1990s. Even before the Berlin Wall fell, Congress had established the Base Realignment and Closure Commission (BRAC). Throughout the 1990s, BRAC shuttered growing numbers of well-established but under-utilised bases around the country. MTMC survived the first few BRAC cycles (1988, 1991, 1993), but not the 1995 round of proposals. At that time the Defense Department recommended closing the Oakland ocean terminal (Military Ocean Terminal Bay Area) and the Military Ocean Terminal at Bayonne. BRAC accepted its recommendations, which meant abolishing MTMC's Eastern and Western Area Commands. Plans called for MTMC to close down those ocean terminals by 2001.

To replace its two area headquarters, HQMTMC planned to establish a single continental United States (CONUS) command. HQMTMC formed a selection team, which evaluated a large variety of sites. In early 1997, Secretary of the Army Togo D. West reviewed the site team recommendations and decided on Fort Eustis, Virginia as the single area command's headquarters.

On 15 October 1997, MTMC established the Deployment Support Command (DSC) at Fort Eustis. Its Eastern and Western Area Commands were consolidated into the DSC. On 30 September 31 September 1999, MTMC closed its Military Ocean Terminals at Bayonne and Oakland. The command appears to have been shuttered after that date.

A new Army Reserve DSC was established in 2007.

== Units in 2026 ==
As of January 2026 the Deployment Support Command consists of the following units:

- Headquarters and Headquarters Company, Deployment Support Command, in Birmingham (AL)
  - 1179th Transportation Surface Brigade, at Fort Hamilton (NY)
    - Headquarters and Headquarters Detachment, 1179th Transportation Surface Brigade, at Fort Hamilton (NY)
    - 1174th Deployment and Distribution Support Battalion, at Fort Totten (NY)
      - Headquarters and Headquarters Detachment, 1174th Deployment and Distribution Support Battalion, at Fort Totten (NY)
      - 652nd Transportation Detachment (Expeditionary Terminal Operations Element — ETOE), at Fort Wadsworth (NY)
      - 928th Transportation Detachment (Automated Cargo Documentation), at Fort Wadsworth (NY)
    - 1185th Deployment and Distribution Support Battalion, in Lancaster (PA)
      - Headquarters and Headquarters Detachment, 1185th Deployment and Distribution Support Battalion, in Lancaster (PA)
      - 91st Transportation Detachment (Expeditionary Terminal Operations Element — ETOE), at Joint Base Langley–Eustis (VA)
      - 629th Transportation Detachment (Automated Cargo Documentation), at Joint Base Langley–Eustis (VA)
    - 1398th Deployment and Distribution Support Battalion, in Baltimore (MD)
      - Headquarters and Headquarters Detachment, 1398th Deployment and Distribution Support Battalion, in Baltimore (MD)
      - 202nd Transportation Detachment (Automated Cargo Documentation), in Baltimore (MD)
      - 417th Transportation Detachment (Expeditionary Terminal Operations Element — ETOE), in Baltimore (MD)
  - 1189th Transportation Surface Brigade, at Joint Base Charleston (SC)
    - Headquarters and Headquarters Detachment, 1189th Transportation Surface Brigade, at Joint Base Charleston (SC)
    - 1173rd Deployment and Distribution Support Battalion, in Brockton (MA)
      - Headquarters and Headquarters Detachment, 1173rd Deployment and Distribution Support Battalion, in Brockton (MA)
      - 301st Transportation Detachment (Expeditionary Terminal Operations Element — ETOE), in Cranston (RI)
    - 1182nd Deployment and Distribution Support Battalion, at Joint Base Charleston (SC)
      - Headquarters and Headquarters Detachment, 1182nd Deployment and Distribution Support Battalion, at Joint Base Charleston (SC)
      - 76th Transportation Detachment (Expeditionary Terminal Operations Element — ETOE), in Orlando (FL)
      - 630th Transportation Detachment (Expeditionary Terminal Operations Element — ETOE), at Joint Base Charleston (SC)
    - 1186th Deployment and Distribution Support Battalion, in Jacksonville (FL)
      - Headquarters and Headquarters Detachment, 1186th Deployment and Distribution Support Battalion, in Jacksonville (FL)
      - 195th Transportation Detachment (Expeditionary Terminal Operations Element — ETOE), in Tampa (FL)
      - 352nd Transportation Detachment (Expeditionary Terminal Operations Element — ETOE), in Sanford (FL)
    - 1188th Deployment and Distribution Support Battalion, in Decatur (GA)
      - Headquarters and Headquarters Detachment, 1188th Deployment and Distribution Support Battalion, in Decatur (GA)
      - 640th Transportation Detachment (Automated Cargo Documentation), in Tampa (FL)
      - 936th Transportation Detachment (Expeditionary Terminal Operations Element — ETOE), in Perrine (FL)
  - 1190th Transportation Surface Brigade, in Baton Rouge (LA)
    - Headquarters and Headquarters Detachment, 1190th Transportation Surface Brigade, in Baton Rouge (LA)
    - 1181st Deployment and Distribution Support Battalion, in Meridian (MS)
      - Headquarters and Headquarters Detachment, 1181st Deployment and Distribution Support Battalion, in Meridian (MS)
      - 369th Transportation Detachment (Expeditionary Terminal Operations Element — ETOE), in Meridian (MS)
      - 541st Transportation Detachment (Expeditionary Terminal Operations Element — ETOE), in Mobile (AL)
      - 677th Transportation Detachment (Automated Cargo Documentation), in Newtown Square (PA)
    - 1184th Deployment and Distribution Support Battalion, in Mobile (AL)
      - Headquarters and Headquarters Detachment, 1184th Deployment and Distribution Support Battalion, in Mobile (AL)
      - 226th Transportation Detachment (Expeditionary Terminal Operations Element — ETOE), in Wilmington (NC)
      - 334th Transportation Detachment (Automated Cargo Documentation), in Panama City (FL)
      - 455th Transportation Detachment (Expeditionary Terminal Operations Element — ETOE), in St. Louis (MO)
      - 508th Transportation Detachment (Automated Cargo Documentation), in Panama City (FL)
    - 1192nd Deployment and Distribution Support Battalion, in New Orleans (LA)
      - Headquarters and Headquarters Detachment, 1192nd Deployment and Distribution Support Battalion, in New Orleans (LA)
      - 370th Transportation Detachment (Expeditionary Terminal Operations Element — ETOE), in Sinton (TX)
      - 461st Transportation Detachment (Expeditionary Terminal Operations Element — ETOE), in McAllen (TX)
      - 614th Transportation Detachment (Automated Cargo Documentation), in Houston (TX)
  - 1394th Transportation Surface Brigade, at Camp Pendleton (CA)
    - Headquarters and Headquarters Detachment, 1394th Transportation Surface Brigade, at Camp Pendleton (CA)
    - 1395th Deployment and Distribution Support Battalion, at Joint Base Lewis–McChord (WA)
      - Headquarters and Headquarters Detachment, 1395th Deployment and Distribution Support Battalion, at Joint Base Lewis–McChord (WA)
      - 643rd Transportation Detachment (Automated Cargo Documentation), at Fairchild Air Force Base (WA)
      - 647th Transportation Detachment (Expeditionary Terminal Operations Element — ETOE), at Joint Base Lewis–McChord (WA)
    - 1397th Deployment and Distribution Support Battalion, at Camp Pendleton (CA)
      - Headquarters and Headquarters Detachment, 1397th Deployment and Distribution Support Battalion, at Camp Pendleton (CA)
      - 502nd Transportation Detachment (Expeditionary Terminal Operations Element — ETOE), at Joint Forces Training Base – Los Alamitos (CA)
      - 639th Transportation Detachment (Automated Cargo Documentation), in Concord (CA)
      - 931st Transportation Detachment (Expeditionary Terminal Operations Element — ETOE), in Sherman Oaks (CA)
  - 757th Expeditionary Railway Center, in St. Louis (MO) and in Richmond (VA)
    - Headquarters and Headquarters Company, in St. Louis (MO)
    - 5 × Railway Planning & Assessment Teams
