= SS Quinault Victory =

Victory ship of the United States

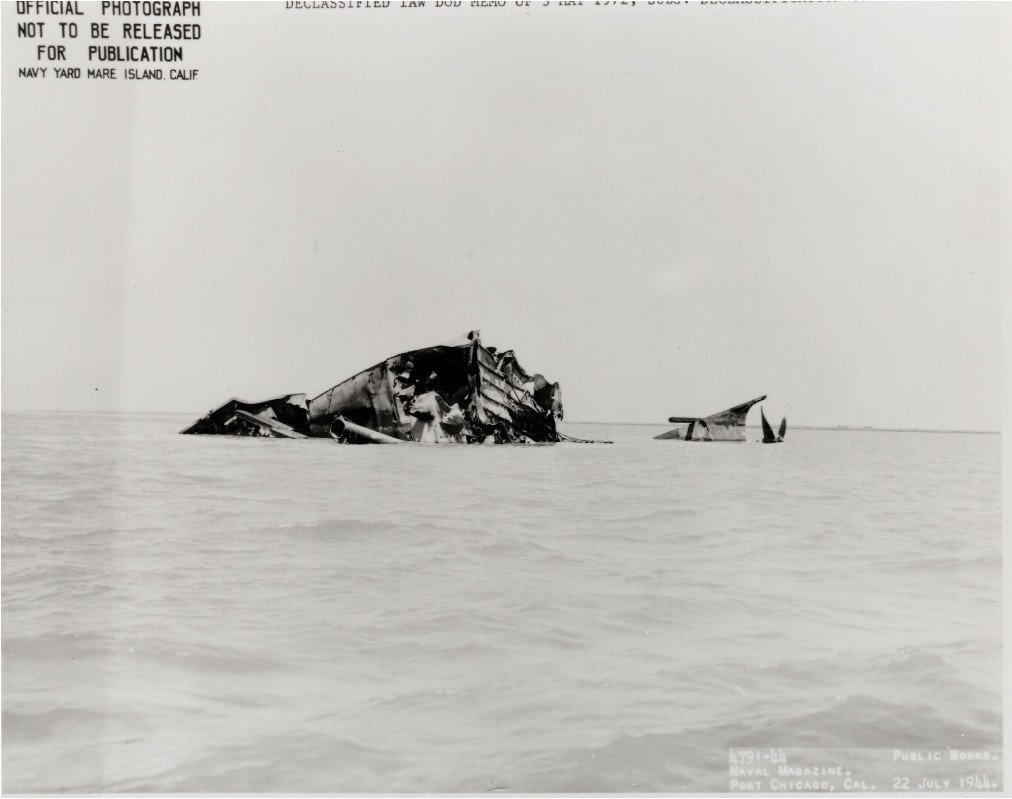
- SS Quinault Victory on 18 July 1944

History

United States
- Name: Quinault Victory
- Namesake: Quinault, Washington
- Owner: War Shipping Administration
- Operator: United States Lines
- Builder: Oregon Shipbuilding Corporation, Portland OR
- Laid down: 3 May 1944
- Launched: 17 June 1944
- In service: 11 July 1944
- Fate: Exploded & sank 17 July 1944 Port Chicago, CA USA

General characteristics
- Class & type: Victory ship VC2-S-AP3
- Tonnage: 7,608 GRT; 12,000 DWT
- Length: 439 ft (134 m)
- Beam: 62 ft (19 m)
- Draft: 28 ft 6 in (8.69 m)
- Propulsion: Westinghouse DR geared turbine, 2 × single screwed 8,500 shp (6,300 kW)
- Speed: 16.5 knots (30.6 km/h; 19.0 mph)
- Complement: 36 Merchant Marine and 17 US Naval Armed Guards
- Armament: 1 × 5-inch (127 mm)/38 caliber gun; 1 × 3-inch (76 mm)/50 caliber gun; 8 × 20 mm Oerlikon
- Notes: MC Hull No. 115

SS Quinault Victory was the thirty-first Victory ship built by Oregon Shipbuilding Corporation in Portland, Oregon under the auspices of the Emergency Shipbuilding Program in support of the United States' involvement in World War II. Laid down on 3 May 1944 and launched on 17 June), Quinault Victory was delivered to the War Shipping Administration and subsequently leased to the United States Lines Company.

== Port Chicago, California ==
On July 11, 1944 Quinault Victory sailed from Portland arriving at the Shell Oil Company's Martinez, California refinery on July 17, where she took on a partial load of fuel oil. Some of the oil taken aboard was of a type that released light hydrocarbon gas on agitation, heating, or standing. This could have resulted in formation of an explosive mixture in the confined air space above the oil in the tanks. Prior to being sent to Martinez for a pre-loading inspection was made by the Port Director's officers and the Captain of the Port's office, and no defects were noted.

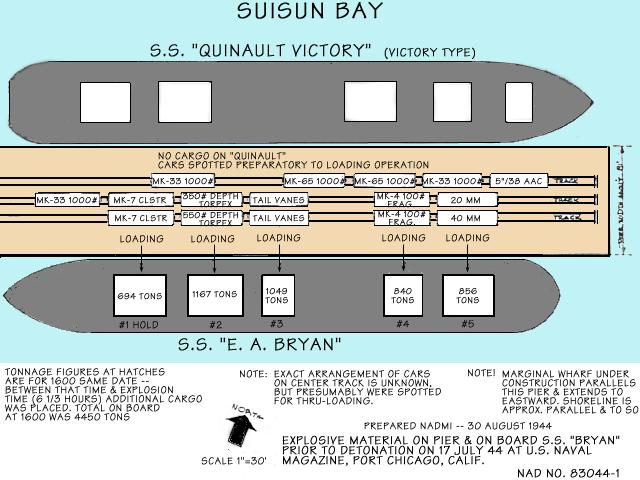
Graphic reconstruction of the pier, boxcars and ships at Port Chicago just prior to explosion, with estimates of type and weight of cargo

Upon leaving Martinez she sailed up Suisun Bay to Port Chicago Naval Magazine, California arriving approximately 6:00 PM (Pacific War Time) in preparation for her maiden voyage. Some difficulty was experienced in mooring her due to winds and tides. She was moored on the starboard side headed east at the outboard berth across from E.A. Bryan, a Liberty ship. Upon arrival at Port Chicago, California both the loading officer and his assistants visited the ship, gave copies of pertinent magazine orders to the master, inspected some of the cargo holds and saw that the ship was being properly rigged for loading. The number 5 cargo hold was not being rigged, as it was not to be loaded that night. As a new ship, this was the first time Quinault Victory had been rigged for loading. Trouble was experienced with shackles and preventer guys as they were non-standard. Winding on some of the winches were on backwards and had to be corrected. Loading normally have started at midnight. Dunnage ammunition and loaded railcars were parked on the pier for loading to the ships. The railcars slated for Quinault Victory contained 253 tons of bombs and 5-inch projectiles for 5-inch/25 caliber guns. Across the pier E.A. Bryan was already loaded with 6,064 tons of ammunition and had an additional 176 tons on the pier, including 60 tons of incendiary clusters, to be loaded before departing.

== Port Chicago disaster ==
On July 17, 1944, at 10:18 p.m., two major explosions occurred six seconds apart in what became known as the Port Chicago disaster. The detonation of 4,600 tons of munitions being loaded onto Quinault Victory and E.A. Bryan, registered at a magnitude of 3.4 on the seismograph at the University of California, Berkeley, some 20 miles (32 km) away. The force of the explosions lifted Quinault Victory out of the water, and she landed 500 ft (150 m) away upside-down and facing the opposite direction. E.A. Bryan was essentially vaporized, as there were no identifiable remains of her following the explosions. 320 sailors and dockworkers were killed and 390 were injured, making it the worst U.S. home front disaster of World War II. The names of those killed aboard Quinault Victory are listed at the Port Chicago Naval Magazine National Memorial which was dedicated in 1994.

Typical Victory ship

== See also ==
- List of Victory ships
- Type C1 ship
- Type C2 ship
- Type C3 ship
