= United States Army Transportation Command =

Coordinates: 38.5452°N 89.8352°W

- ARTRANS Shoulder sleeve insignia
- Active: 15 February 1965–Present
- Country: United States of America
- Branch: United States Army
- Type: Army Service Component Command
- Part of: United States Army Materiel Command and United States Transportation Command
- Garrison/HQ: Scott Air Force Base, Illinois
- Nickname: Surface Warriors
- Mottos: Deliver Readiness and Lethality
- Decorations: Superior Unit Award

Commanders
- Commander: MG Lance G. Curtis
- Deputy to the Commander: Kristina M. O'Brien
- Deputy Commanding Officer: Colonel David P. Key
- Chief of Staff: Colonel Shari R. Bennett
- Command Sergeant Major: Command Sergeant Major Randy Brown

Insignia
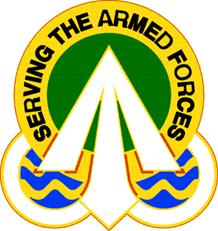
- Distinctive unit insignia

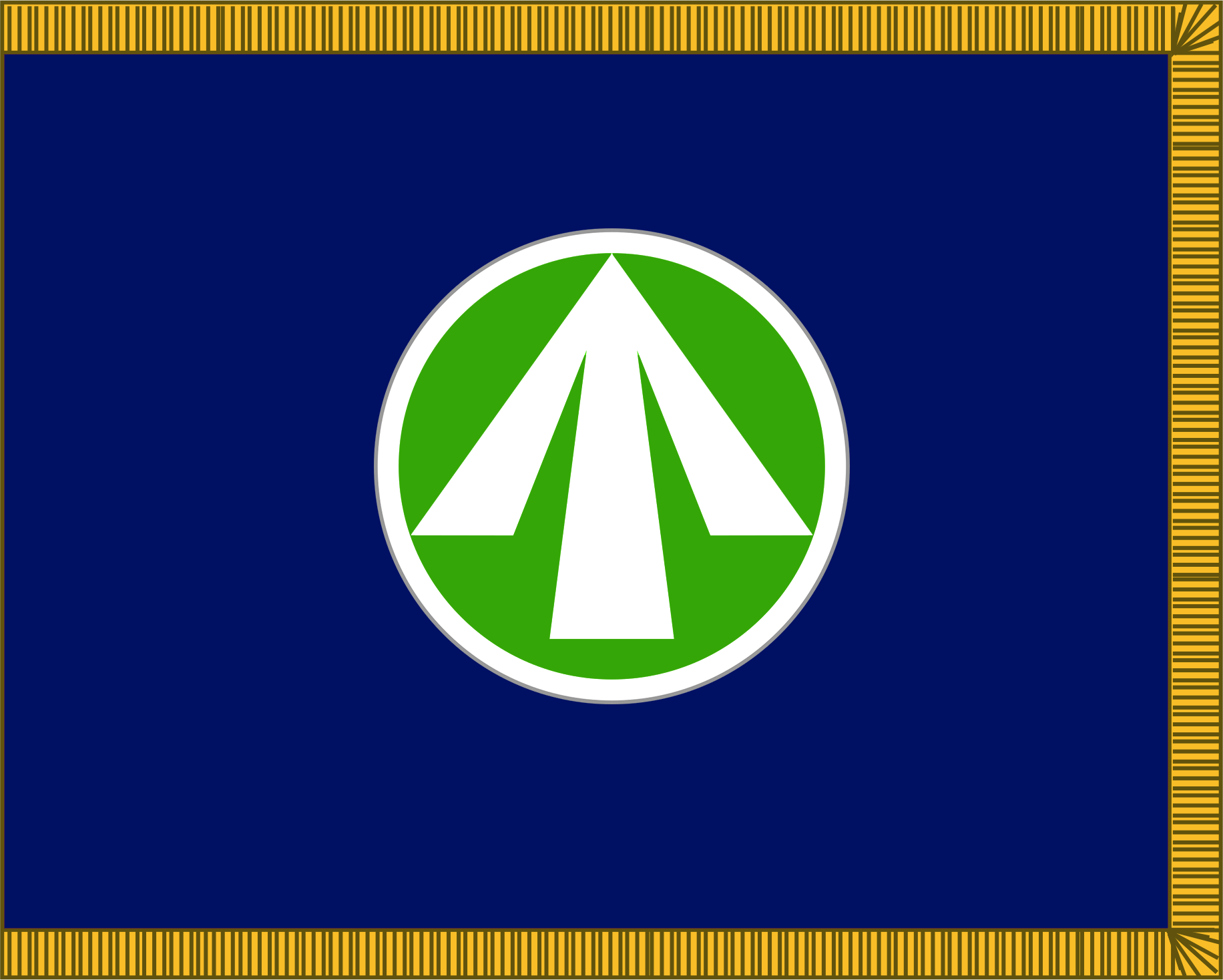
- Army Transportation Command Flag

The United States Army Transportation Command (ARTRANS) is the Army Service Component Command of the U.S. Transportation Command (USTRANSCOM) and is a major subordinate command to Army Materiel Command (AMC). This relationship links USTRANSCOM's Joint Deployment and Distribution Enterprise and AMC's Materiel Enterprise. The command also partners with the commercial transportation industry as the coordinating link between DOD surface transportation requirements and the capability industry provides.

== History ==
The command traces its organizational lineage to the Army's former Office of the Chief of Transportation, established 31 July 1942. Fourteen years later, the Defense Department established a separate agency to carry out traffic management functions. On 1 May 1956, ARTRANS's original mandate began when the secretary of defense designated the secretary of the Army as the single manager for military traffic within the United States.

=== Military Traffic Management Agency/US Army Transportation Terminal Command ===
On 1 July 1956, the Army established the Military Traffic Management Agency (MTMA) to carry out those single-manager functions. Originally, MTMA did not operate military ocean terminals, a function held by the U.S. Army Transportation Terminal Command (a Transportation Corps component).

The original MTMA did not feature port commands but did include five regional offices: eastern (Pittsburgh, PA), western (Oakland, CA), central (St. Louis, MO), southwestern (Dallas, TX), and southeastern (Atlanta, GA). This arrangement essentially lasted until 1965. Only the Oakland headquarters remained the same after that time. MTMA and then DTMS called the field offices "traffic regions".

=== Defense Traffic Management Service ===
MTMA lasted only five and one half years. Then, as part of his overall DOD restructuring, Secretary of Defense Robert McNamara transferred the organization to the newly established Defense Supply Agency (DSA). On 1 January 1962, he re-designated MTMA as the Defense Traffic Management Service (DTMS). The United States Army Materiel Command then took over the military ocean terminals. However, DOD and congressional concerns over duplication in military logistics soon led to further reorganizations. After a detailed reexamination of the Defense Transportation System, McNamara designated the Secretary of the Army as the single manager for military traffic, land transportation, and common-user ocean terminals on 19 November 1964.

=== Military Traffic Management and Terminal Service ===
To execute this centralized management concept, a joint service planning staff formed up to establish an agency, the Military Traffic Management and Terminal Service (MTMTS). DOD then formally activated MTMTS as a jointly staffed Army major command on 15 February 1965. MTMTS assumed all responsibilities assigned to the Defense Traffic Management Service and the terminal operations functions of the U.S. Army Supply and Maintenance Command (a component of the Army Materiel Command). With the approval and publication of its single-manager charter on 24 June 1965, MTMTS joined the Military Air Transport Service and the Military Sea Transport Service (now Military Sealift Command) in providing complete transportation services to the Department of Defense.

The formation of the Military Traffic Management and Terminal Service resulted in tremendous change in the command's organization. Since MTMTS now operated military ocean terminals, it focused its area command structure on ports. Upon the command's formation the former eastern traffic region headquarters moved to Brooklyn Army Terminal in Brooklyn, New York, and became Eastern Area. Western Area (formerly a traffic region) headquarters remained at Oakland, CA. MTMTS abolished the southwestern and southeastern field offices. For two years, however, MTMTS retained its central area command in St. Louis, MO.

To streamline operations further, the command then disestablished that headquarters in early 1967 and transferred its functions to Eastern Area. MTMS maintained its Eastern Area Headquarters at Brooklyn, N.Y. until September 1975 when it moved to Bayonne N.J.

In 1966 the Transportation Engineering Agency, Fort Eustis, VA, the Army's only activity with traffic and transportability engineering expertise became a major component of MTMTS.

MTMTS moved cargo for the Vietnam War at Military Ocean Terminal Bay Area (MOTBA) at Oakland CA, Military Ocean Terminal at Bayonne, New Jersey (MOTBY) and Military Ocean Terminal Sunny Point, NC (MOTSU) as well as commercial ports. In the earlier years of the war MTMTS shipped soldiers by surface from its Western Area (primarily Oakland)/Oakland Army Terminal. By 1967 as troops rotated to Vietnam in small groups or individually, fewer soldiers went by surface; most were airlifted to the theater.

As a means of easing serious congestion and ship delay, MTMTS in 1966 initiated a practice of sending full shiploads to single ports of debarkation in theater whenever possible. It continued this practice throughout the war. Between 1965 and 1969 MTMS in conjunction with the Military Sealift Command transported over 22,000,000 short tons (20,000,000 t) of dry cargo and over 14,000,000 short tons (13,000,000 t) of bulk petroleum to Vietnam.

=== Military Traffic Management Command ===
On 31 July 1974, MTMTS was re-designated as the Military Traffic Management Command (MTMC) to make its title more readily identifiable with its mission.

=== United States Transportation Command ===
On 1 October 1988, MTMC, along with the Military Sealift Command and the Military Airlift Command officially became components of the United States Transportation Command (TRANSCOM). Created on 18 April 1987, TRANSCOM began official operations on 1 October 1987, as DOD's single unified transportation command.

TRANSCOM's mission was to integrate global air, land and sea transportation in support of national security objectives. MTMC, MSC and MAC remained as major commands of their parent services and have continued to perform service-unique missions under the direction of their military departments. On 1992-02-14 DOD gave TRANSCOM control of service-operated transportation in both peace and war.

== The first Gulf war ==
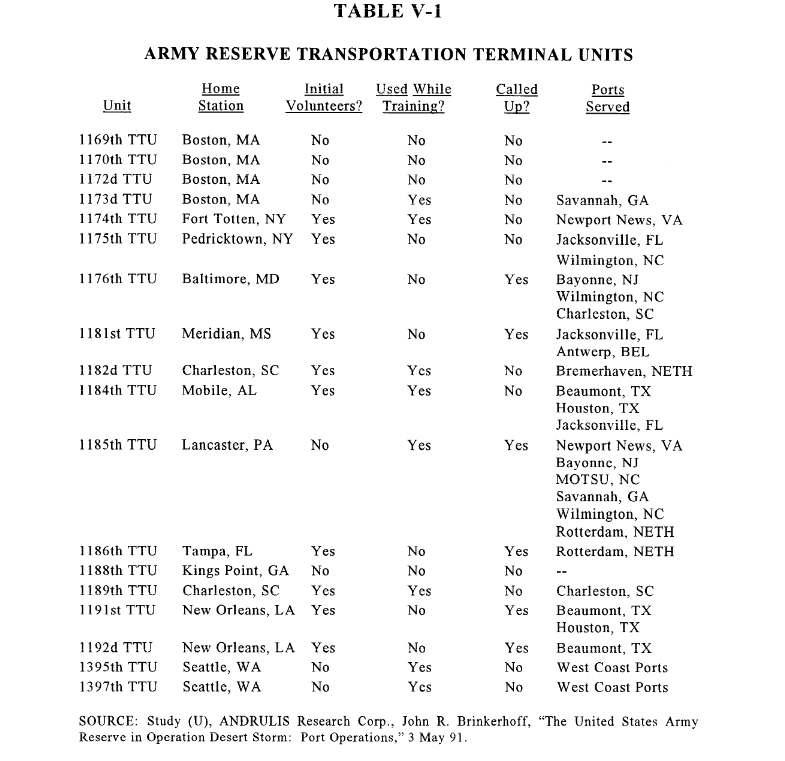
Army Reserve Transportation Terminal Units Mobilized After Iraqi Invasion of Kuwait (1990-91)

The millions of tons of cargo and thousands of troops moved to support Operation Desert Shield/DESERT STORM marked the largest test of the military's logistical capability since the World War II Normandy invasion. During the Gulf War, MTMC personnel successfully managed the movement of 85% of the unit equipment shipped to Saudi Arabia. They operated out of 33 ports worldwide and loaded more than 945,000 pieces of equipment equaling 6.5 million measurement tons (7.4 million m³) onto 564 ships bound for Saudi Arabia. At the peak of operations, MTMC activated 12 transportation units, 225 volunteers, and 73 Individual Mobilization Augmentees from the Reserve components to support DESERT SHIELD missions. Under the Special Middle East Shipping Agreements, MTMC booked 37,000 forty-foot commercial containers with sustainment supplies aboard commercial liners bound for Southwest Asia.

== After the Gulf war: organizational changes ==
The Gulf War resulted in changes for MTMC. In 1991, MTMC re-designated its Transportation Terminal Command Far East as MTMC Pacific and moved it from Korea to Hawaii. Headquarters then assigned MTMC Europe as a subordinate command of MTMC Eastern Area in July 1992. This arrangement meshed with HQMTMC's relationships with Western Area and MTMC Pacific. The Command's February 1993 reorganization created an organization that provided improved quality service and optimum strategic deployability of America's forces in support of national defense.

The Commands directorates of international traffic, inland traffic, passenger traffic, personal property and safety and security were centralized into a single Operations Directorate. The reorganization also combined personnel and logistics into a single directorate.

MTMC managed cargo shipping for several deployments during the 1990s. Among them were to Operation Restore Hope, Somalia in 1993; Operation Support Hope, Rwanda, in 1994;, Operation Uphold Democracy Haiti in 1994; Operation Vigilant Warrior shipping to King Abdulaziz Port in Dammam, Saudi Arabia, 1994–95; and Operation Joint Endeavor, Bosnia-Herzegovina in 1996.

In general, the Cold War's end meant continuous change for MTMC. Even before the Berlin Wall fell, Congress had established the Base Realignment and Closing Commission (BRAC). Throughout the 1990s, this group shuttered growing numbers of well-established but less-used bases around the country. MTMC survived the first few BRAC cycles (1988, 1991, 1993), but not the 1995 round of proposals. At that time the Defense Department recommended closing the Oakland and Bayonne military ocean terminals. BRAC accepted its recommendations, which meant abolishing MTMC's Eastern and Western Area Commands. According to plan, MTMC would close down those ocean terminals by 2001.

To replace its two area headquarters, HQMTMC planned to establish a single continental United States (CONUS) command. HQMTMC formed a selection team, which evaluated a large variety of sites. In early 1997, Secretary of the Army Togo D. West reviewed the site team recommendations and decided on Fort Eustis, Virginia as the single area command's headquarters.

The loss of the area commands meant gain in other areas. As a result of the recommendations by its Organizational Excellence team, HQMTMC made MTMC Europe (since 1992 a component of Eastern Area) and MTMC Pacific (a component of Western Area) separate commands in late 1996.

In an effort to make its organizations more recognizable as regular Army units, MTMC re-designated its port units on 1 October 1997. The previous four-digit designations (like the 1169th TTU, 1170th TTU, 1172nd 1173rd, 1174th, 1175th, 1176th TTUs) changed to three digits and the major and medium port commands changed to groups, battalions, and companies. For example, MTMC Europe became the 598th Transportation Group (Terminal) and MTMC Pacific became the 599th Transportation Group (Terminal).

== Relocations & reorganizations ==
On 15 October 1997, MTMC established the Deployment Support Command (DSC) at Fort Eustis. Its Eastern and Western Area Commands were consolidated into the DSC. On 30 September 31 September 1999, MTMC closed its Military Ocean Terminals at Bayonne and Oakland.

The Commands headquarters moved the following year. For the 35 years MTMC headquarters operated out of the Nassif Building in Falls Church, VA. From May through October 2000, the Headquarters relocated to the Hoffman II Building in Alexandria, VA.

Continuing with its streamlining operations, MTMC began in 2000 to standardize the size and organization of its groups, battalions and companies worldwide. Prior to these changes, MTMCs transportation battalions varied in strength from 19 to 84 persons. During the following year MTMC reorganized into a single operating headquarters, split-based in Alexandria VA and Fort Eustis VA. The Command concurrently deactivated its Deployment Support Command and stood up its Operations Center in November 2001.

During 2001 and throughout 2002, MTMC mobilized Reserve Transportation units and organized Deployment Support Teams as part of its support for the Global War on Terrorism. From October 2002 thru May 2003, the Command supported Operations Enduring Freedom and Iraqi Freedom, moving over 15,000,000 square feet (1,400,000 m^{2}) of cargo, operating from 16 seaports and power projection platforms worldwide.

Throughout the 1990s the Command worked continuously to reengineer its Household Goods Moving Program. In November 2002 it began developing a new program titled, Families First to be the revised DOD Household Goods Program. Families Firsts objective is threefold (1) to improve the liability/claims process; (2) to improve carrier performance through performance based acquisitions and (3) to implement an integrated move management system.

=== Military Surface Deployment and Distribution Command ===
With TRANSCOM's designation as the DOD's Joint Distribution Process Owner in the fall of 2003 and as a result of MTMC's changed missions to meet the demands of the "Global War on Terror", the Command changed its name officially on 1 January 2004 to Military Surface Deployment and Distribution Command.

=== United States Army Transportation Command ===
On 24 September 2025, the Military Surface Deployment and Distribution Command was redesignated United States Army Transportation Command (ARTRANS).

== Organization ==
The Command comprises the following components (as of September 2025):

=== US Army Transportation Command ===
- United States Army Transportation Command, at Scott Air Force Base
  - Transportation Engineering Agency, at Scott Air Force Base
  - 595th Transportation Surface Brigade, at Camp Arifjan (Kuwait)
    - Headquarters and Headquarters Detachment, 595th Transportation Surface Brigade, at Camp Arifjan (Kuwait)
    - 831st Transportation Battalion, in Manama (Bahrain)
    - 840th Transportation Battalion, at the Port of Shuaiba (Kuwait)
  - 596th Transportation Surface Brigade, at Military Ocean Terminal Sunny Point (NC)
    - Headquarters and Headquarters Detachment, 596th Transportation Surface Brigade, at Military Ocean Terminal Sunny Point (NC)
    - 832nd Transportation Battalion, at Joint Base Langley–Eustis (VA)
    - 833rd Transportation Battalion, at Joint Base Lewis–McChord (WA)
    - 834th Transportation Battalion, in Concord (CA)
  - 597th Transportation Surface Brigade, at Joint Base Langley–Eustis (VA)
    - Headquarters and Headquarters Detachment, 597th Transportation Surface Brigade, at Joint Base Langley–Eustis (VA)
    - 841st Transportation Battalion, at Joint Base Charleston (SC)
    - 842nd Transportation Battalion, in Beaumont (TX)
  - 598th Transportation Surface Brigade, in Sembach (Germany)
    - Headquarters and Headquarters Detachment, 598th Transportation Surface Brigade, in Sembach (Germany)
    - 838th Transportation Battalion, in Kaiserslautern (Germany)
    - 839th Transportation Battalion, in Livorno (Italy)
  - 599th Transportation Surface Brigade, at Schofield Barracks (HI)
    - Headquarters and Headquarters Detachment, 599th Transportation Surface Brigade, at Schofield Barracks (HI)
    - 835th Transportation Battalion, in Okinawa (Japan)
    - 836th Transportation Battalion, in Yokohama (Japan)
    - 837th Transportation Battalion, in Busan (South Korea)

=== Deployment Support Command ===
The Deployment Support Command is the United States Army Reserve component of Army Transportation Command. As of January 2026 it consists of the following units:

- Deployment Support Command, in Birmingham (AL)
  - Headquarters and Headquarters Company, Deployment Support Command, in Birmingham (AL)
  - 1179th Transportation Surface Brigade, at Fort Hamilton (NY)
    - Headquarters and Headquarters Detachment, 1179th Transportation Surface Brigade, at Fort Hamilton (NY)
    - 1174th Deployment and Distribution Support Battalion, at Fort Totten (NY)
      - Headquarters and Headquarters Detachment, 1174th Deployment and Distribution Support Battalion, at Fort Totten (NY)
      - 652nd Transportation Detachment (Expeditionary Terminal Operations Element — ETOE), at Fort Wadsworth (NY)
      - 928th Transportation Detachment (Automated Cargo Documentation), at Fort Wadsworth (NY)
    - 1185th Deployment and Distribution Support Battalion, in Lancaster (PA)
      - Headquarters and Headquarters Detachment, 1185th Deployment and Distribution Support Battalion, in Lancaster (PA)
      - 91st Transportation Detachment (Expeditionary Terminal Operations Element — ETOE), at Joint Base Langley–Eustis (VA)
      - 629th Transportation Detachment (Automated Cargo Documentation), at Joint Base Langley–Eustis (VA)
    - 1398th Deployment and Distribution Support Battalion, in Baltimore (MD)
      - Headquarters and Headquarters Detachment, 1398th Deployment and Distribution Support Battalion, in Baltimore (MD)
      - 202nd Transportation Detachment (Automated Cargo Documentation), in Baltimore (MD)
      - 417th Transportation Detachment (Expeditionary Terminal Operations Element — ETOE), in Baltimore (MD)
  - 1189th Transportation Surface Brigade, at Joint Base Charleston (SC)
    - Headquarters and Headquarters Detachment, 1189th Transportation Surface Brigade, at Joint Base Charleston (SC)
    - 1173rd Deployment and Distribution Support Battalion, in Brockton (MA)
      - Headquarters and Headquarters Detachment, 1173rd Deployment and Distribution Support Battalion, in Brockton (MA)
      - 301st Transportation Detachment (Expeditionary Terminal Operations Element — ETOE), in Cranston (RI)
    - 1182nd Deployment and Distribution Support Battalion, at Joint Base Charleston (SC)
      - Headquarters and Headquarters Detachment, 1182nd Deployment and Distribution Support Battalion, at Joint Base Charleston (SC)
      - 76th Transportation Detachment (Expeditionary Terminal Operations Element — ETOE), in Orlando (FL)
      - 630th Transportation Detachment (Expeditionary Terminal Operations Element — ETOE), at Joint Base Charleston (SC)
    - 1186th Deployment and Distribution Support Battalion, in Jacksonville (FL)
      - Headquarters and Headquarters Detachment, 1186th Deployment and Distribution Support Battalion, in Jacksonville (FL)
      - 195th Transportation Detachment (Expeditionary Terminal Operations Element — ETOE), in Tampa (FL)
      - 352nd Transportation Detachment (Expeditionary Terminal Operations Element — ETOE), in Sanford (FL)
    - 1188th Deployment and Distribution Support Battalion, in Decatur (GA)
      - Headquarters and Headquarters Detachment, 1188th Deployment and Distribution Support Battalion, in Decatur (GA)
      - 640th Transportation Detachment (Automated Cargo Documentation), in Tampa (FL)
      - 936th Transportation Detachment (Expeditionary Terminal Operations Element — ETOE), in Perrine (FL)
  - 1190th Transportation Surface Brigade, in Baton Rouge (LA)
    - Headquarters and Headquarters Detachment, 1190th Transportation Surface Brigade, in Baton Rouge (LA)
    - 1181st Deployment and Distribution Support Battalion, in Meridian (MS)
      - Headquarters and Headquarters Detachment, 1181st Deployment and Distribution Support Battalion, in Meridian (MS)
      - 369th Transportation Detachment (Expeditionary Terminal Operations Element — ETOE), in Meridian (MS)
      - 541st Transportation Detachment (Expeditionary Terminal Operations Element — ETOE), in Mobile (AL)
      - 677th Transportation Detachment (Automated Cargo Documentation), in Newtown Square (PA)
    - 1184th Deployment and Distribution Support Battalion, in Mobile (AL)
      - Headquarters and Headquarters Detachment, 1184th Deployment and Distribution Support Battalion, in Mobile (AL)
      - 226th Transportation Detachment (Expeditionary Terminal Operations Element — ETOE), in Wilmington (NC)
      - 334th Transportation Detachment (Automated Cargo Documentation), in Panama City (FL)
      - 455th Transportation Detachment (Expeditionary Terminal Operations Element — ETOE), in St. Louis (MO)
      - 508th Transportation Detachment (Automated Cargo Documentation), in Panama City (FL)
    - 1192nd Deployment and Distribution Support Battalion, in New Orleans (LA)
      - Headquarters and Headquarters Detachment, 1192nd Deployment and Distribution Support Battalion, in New Orleans (LA)
      - 370th Transportation Detachment (Expeditionary Terminal Operations Element — ETOE), in Sinton (TX)
      - 461st Transportation Detachment (Expeditionary Terminal Operations Element — ETOE), in McAllen (TX)
      - 614th Transportation Detachment (Automated Cargo Documentation), in Houston (TX)
  - 1394th Transportation Surface Brigade, at Camp Pendleton (CA)
    - Headquarters and Headquarters Detachment, 1394th Transportation Surface Brigade, at Camp Pendleton (CA)
    - 1395th Deployment and Distribution Support Battalion, at Joint Base Lewis–McChord (WA)
      - Headquarters and Headquarters Detachment, 1395th Deployment and Distribution Support Battalion, at Joint Base Lewis–McChord (WA)
      - 643rd Transportation Detachment (Automated Cargo Documentation), at Fairchild Air Force Base (WA)
      - 647th Transportation Detachment (Expeditionary Terminal Operations Element — ETOE), at Joint Base Lewis–McChord (WA)
    - 1397th Deployment and Distribution Support Battalion, at Camp Pendleton (CA)
      - Headquarters and Headquarters Detachment, 1397th Deployment and Distribution Support Battalion, at Camp Pendleton (CA)
      - 502nd Transportation Detachment (Expeditionary Terminal Operations Element — ETOE), in Los Alamitos (CA)
      - 639th Transportation Detachment (Automated Cargo Documentation), in Concord (CA)
      - 931st Transportation Detachment (Expeditionary Terminal Operations Element — ETOE), in Sherman Oaks (CA)
  - 757th Expeditionary Railway Center, in St. Louis (MO) and in Richmond (VA)
    - Headquarters and Headquarters Company, in St. Louis (MO)
    - 5 × Railway Planning & Assessment Teams

== See also ==
Comparable organizations

- United States Transportation Command
- Military Sealift Command (U.S. Navy)
- Air Mobility Command (U.S. Air Force)
