= Military Ocean Terminal =

United States Army logistics installation

Military Ocean Terminals are operated by the U.S. Army Transportation Command (ARTRANS) for distribution of surface cargo from storage and repair depots to military forward based units.

== Current facilities ==
- Military Ocean Terminal Concord (MOTCO), California on the Stockton Deepwater Shipping Channel (formerly Concord Naval Weapons Station)
- Military Ocean Terminal Sunny Point (MOTSU), North Carolina

== Former and closed facilities ==
- Military Ocean Terminal (MOTBY), Bayonne, New Jersey, closed 1999
- New Orleans Military Ocean Terminal (NOMOT), New Orleans, Louisiana, Closed December 1994
- Military Ocean Terminal Bay Area (MOTBA), headquartered at Oakland Army Base, Oakland, California, closed 1999.
