= Port Chicago Naval Magazine National Memorial =

National Memorial of the United States

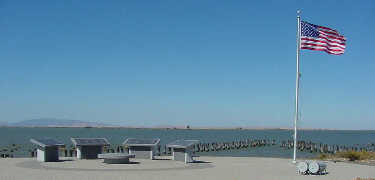
- Port Chicago Naval Magazine National Memorial

- Location within California Location within the United States
- Interactive map of Port Chicago Naval Magazine National Memorial
- Location: Concord, California, U.S.
- Nearest city: Oakland, California
- Coordinates: 38°3′27″N 122°1′47″W
- Area: 5 acres (2.0 ha)
- Established: October 28, 1992
- Visitors: 782 (in 2025)
- Governing body: U.S. Navy & National Park Service
- Website: www.nps.gov/poch/index.htm

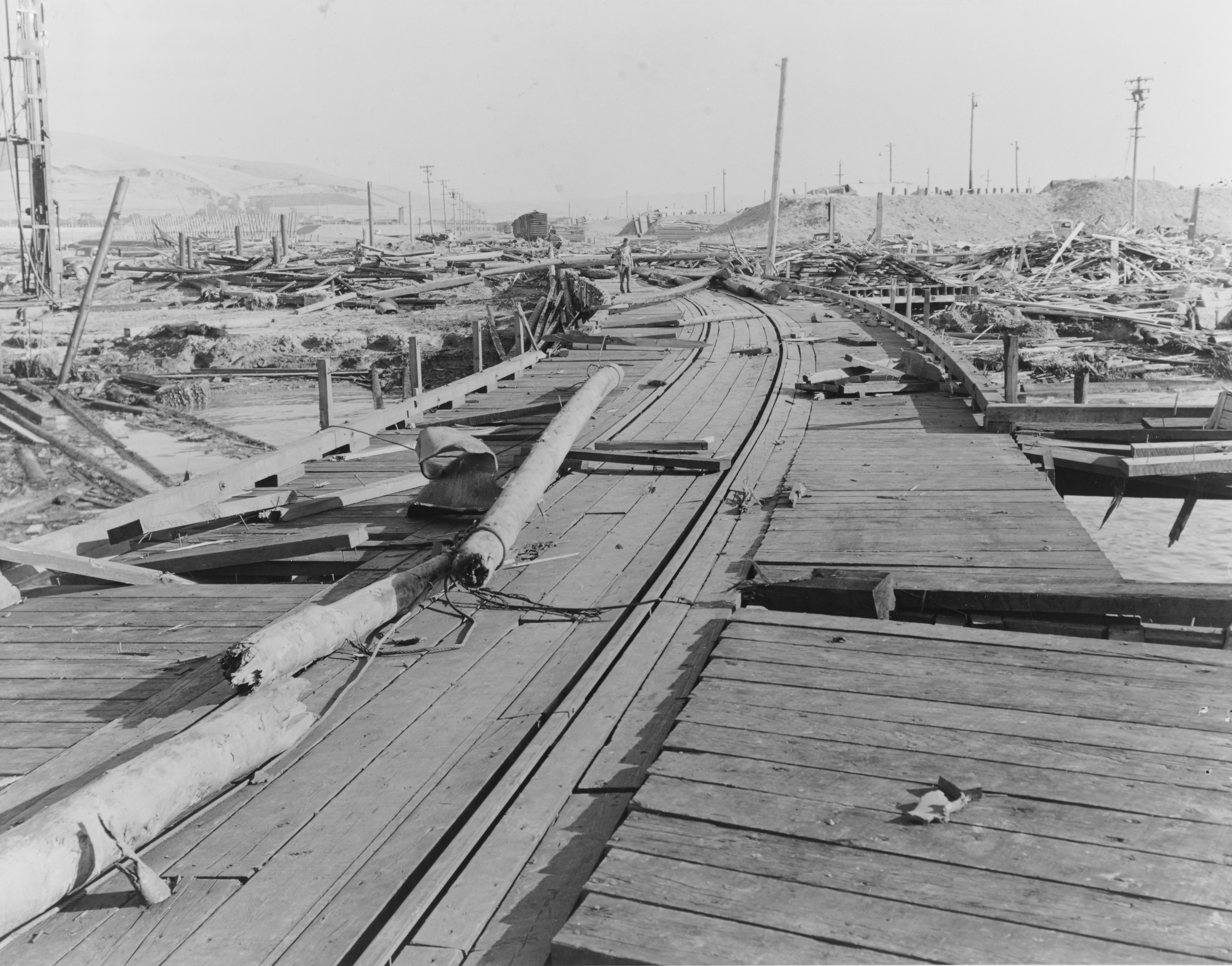
Aftermath of the Port Chicago explosion.

The Port Chicago Naval Magazine National Memorial is a memorial dedicated in 1994 recognizing the dead of the Port Chicago disaster, and the critical role played by Port Chicago, California during World War II, in serving as the main facility for the Pacific Theater of Operations. The national memorial is located at the Military Ocean Terminal Concord (formerly the Concord Naval Weapons Station) near Concord, California, in the United States.

The 1944 Port Chicago disaster occurred at the naval magazine and resulted in the largest domestic loss of life during World War II. A total of 320 sailors and civilians were instantly killed on July 17, 1944, when the ships they were loading with ammunition and bombs exploded. The majority of the deaths were African American sailors working for the racially segregated military. The explosion and its aftermath led to the largest Naval mutiny in US history, and it and the subsequent trial became major catalysts for the United States Navy to desegregate following the war.

== History ==
The national memorial, administered by the National Park Service, was authorized by Pub. L. 102–562 on October 28, 1992. The memorial was dedicated in 1994 and is located on the grounds of the Military Ocean Terminal Concord (MOTCO), formerly the Tidal Area of the Concord Naval Weapons Station. The memorial is only open to the public through reserved guided tours. On October 28, 2009, the Memorial became an official unit of the National Park System.

== Plans ==
The Port Chicago Committee is working toward expanding the current memorial to encompass 250 acres (1.0 km^{2}) of the former Port Chicago waterfront. The memorial site could include some of the railroad revetments and old boxcars from the 1940s period, as well as the existing memorial chapel, with stained-glass windows depicting the World War II operations.

== See also ==
- Other Navy memorials
- Rosie the Riveter/World War II Home Front National Historical Park
- List of national memorials of the United States
