= Matt Delmont =

American historian (born 1977)

- Born: December 15, 1977 (age 48)

Academic background
- Education: B.A., Social Studies, 2000, Harvard University; M.A, 2004, PhD., American Studies, 2008, Brown University
- Thesis: "American Bandstand" and school segregation in postwar Philadelphia (2008)

Academic work
- Institutions: Dartmouth College; Arizona State University; Scripps College
- Website: mattdelmont.com

Matthew F. Delmont (born December 15, 1977) is an American professor of history and author. He is the Sherman Fairchild Distinguished Professor of History at Dartmouth College and currently serves as interim Provost of Dartmouth until June 2028.

He formerly was a Professor of History at Arizona State University (ASU) and Scripps College.

== Early life and education ==
Delmont earned his Bachelor of Arts degree from Harvard University before enrolling in Brown University for his Master's degree and Ph.D. in American Studies.

== Career ==
Upon earning his PhD, Delmont accepted a position as assistant professor of American studies at Scripps College. While teaching there, he received the 2011 Professor of the Year Award, and authored The Nicest Kids in Town: American Bandstand, Rock n’ Roll, and the Struggle for Civil Rights in 1950s Philadelphia (University of California Press, 2012). In the book, he discredits claims by American Bandstand's host and producer Dick Clark that the show was a pioneer of on-air racial politics and integration in the late 1950s. Instead, Delmont found through his interviews of Philadelphia natives who had attended, watched, or protested American Bandstand, that there was systematic marginalization of local African-American fans and musicians throughout the show's running.

By June 2014, Delmont left Scripps College and accepted a position at Arizona State University (ASU) as a professor in their history department. During his tenure at ASU, Delmont published his second book titled Making Roots: A Nation Captivated (The University of California Press, 2016). The book explores the history and creation of the 1977 miniseries Roots. In the same year, he also published Why Busing Failed: Race, Media, and the National Resistance to School Desegregation, a historical review of America's school busing aimed at desegregation, and overall educational equality policy. Following publication of these two books, Delmont was promoted to Director of ASU's School of Historical, Philosophical and Religious Studies and awarded a Guggenheim Fellowship to continue his research on African-American racial struggles in America.

Delmont left ASU to become the Sherman Fairchild Distinguished Professor of History at Dartmouth College in 2019. In his first year at Dartmouth, the Stanford University Press published Delmont's multi-year project Black Quotidian. The goal of the project was to create an open-access multimedia free archive that featured 1,000 media objects from African-American newspapers, audio clips, and videos during key moments of black resistance in American history. Beyond the archive, he published Black Quotidian: Everyday History in African-American Newspapers, which won the Garfinkel Prize. The digital book drew from the collected archived source material and integrated it into a scholarly context.

In the September 2022 issue of Smithsonian magazine, Delmont published an article on the 1944 Port Chicago disaster entitled "A Deadly World War II Explosion Sparked Black Soldiers to Fight for Equal Treatment", which he expanded that same year into a critically acclaimed book, Half American: The Epic Story of African Americans Fighting World War II at Home and Abroad. The book covers the Port Chicago incident in detail, as well as the larger struggle by African Americans for equality and respect while fighting overseas in WWII, and when returning home after the war.

Delmont released Until the Last Gun Is Silent in January 2026. The book covered African American opposition to the Vietnam War.
