= 643rd Transportation Detachment =

- Country: United States
- Branch: United States Army
- Type: Transportation
- Size: Company
- Garrison/HQ: Fairchild Air Force Base
- Nicknames: Northwest Stags "Buck up & Move Out!"

Commanders
- Current commander: unknown

Insignia
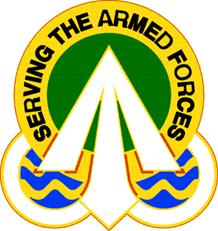
- Distinctive Unit Insignia

The 643rd Transportation Detachment also known as the 643rd Auto Cargo Documentation Detachment is a subordinate unit of the 1395th Transportation Battalion, 1394th Transportation Surface Brigade. The 1394th Transportation Surface Brigade is part of the Reserve's Deployment Support Command.

== History ==
- Constituted 10 January 1967 in the Regular Army as the 643d Transportation Detachment.
- Activated 1 March 1967 at Fort Story, Virginia
- Inactivated 18 March 1968 at Fort Story, Virginia
- Activated 1 January 1969 at Fort Sill, Oklahoma
- Inactivated 30 September 1971 at Fort Sill, Oklahoma
- Withdrawn 5 March 1998 from the Regular Army and allotted to the Army Reserve
- Activated 16 September 2001 at Spokane, Washington
- Ordered into active military service 15 October 2009 at Spokane, Washington; released from active military service 18 November 2010 and reverted to reserve status with location at Fairchild Air Force Base, Washington

The deployment in 2009-10 was to Kuwait.
