= Port Chicago disaster =

1944 munitions ship explosion in California

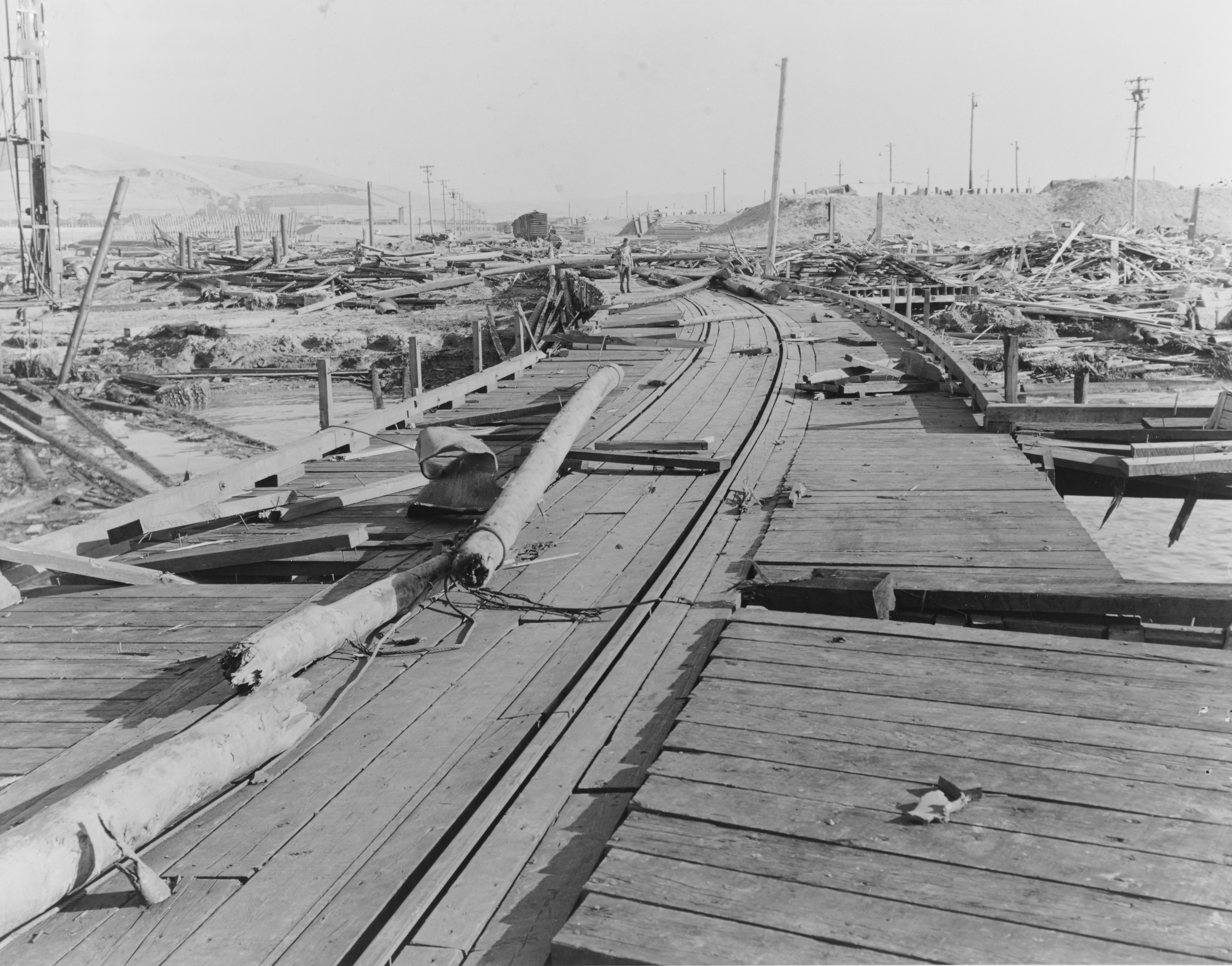
- Damage at the Port Chicago Pier after the explosion of July 17, 1944
Date	July 17, 1944; 82 years ago
Location	Port Chicago Naval Magazine, Port Chicago, California, U.S. 38°03′27″N 122°01′47″W
Result	320 killed; 390+ injured

The Port Chicago disaster was a deadly munitions explosion of the ship SS E. A. Bryan on July 17, 1944, at the Port Chicago Naval Magazine in Port Chicago, California, United States. Munitions being loaded onto a cargo vessel bound for the Pacific Theater of Operations detonated, killing 320 sailors and civilians and injuring at least 390 others. Most of the dead were African-American sailors.

A month later, the unsafe conditions prompted hundreds of African American servicemen to refuse to load munitions, an act known as the Port Chicago Mutiny. More than 200 were convicted of various charges. Fifty of these men‍—‌, called the "Port Chicago 50"‍—‌, were convicted of mutiny and sentenced to 15 years of prison and hard labor, as well as a dishonorable discharge. Forty-seven of the 50 were released in January 1946; the remaining three served additional months in prison. During and after the mutiny court-martial, questions were raised about the fairness and legality of the proceedings. Owing to public pressure, the United States Navy reconvened the courts-martial board in 1945—that board re-affirmed convictions. Those convictions stood until 2024, when the Navy posthumously exonerated all 256 men convicted during the courts-martial, including the Port Chicago 50.

Widespread publicity surrounding the case turned it into a cause célèbre among Americans opposing discrimination targeting African Americans; it and other race-related Navy protests of 1944–45 led the Navy to change its practices and initiate the desegregation of its forces beginning in February 1946. In 1994, the Port Chicago Naval Magazine National Memorial was dedicated to the lives lost in the disaster.

== Background ==
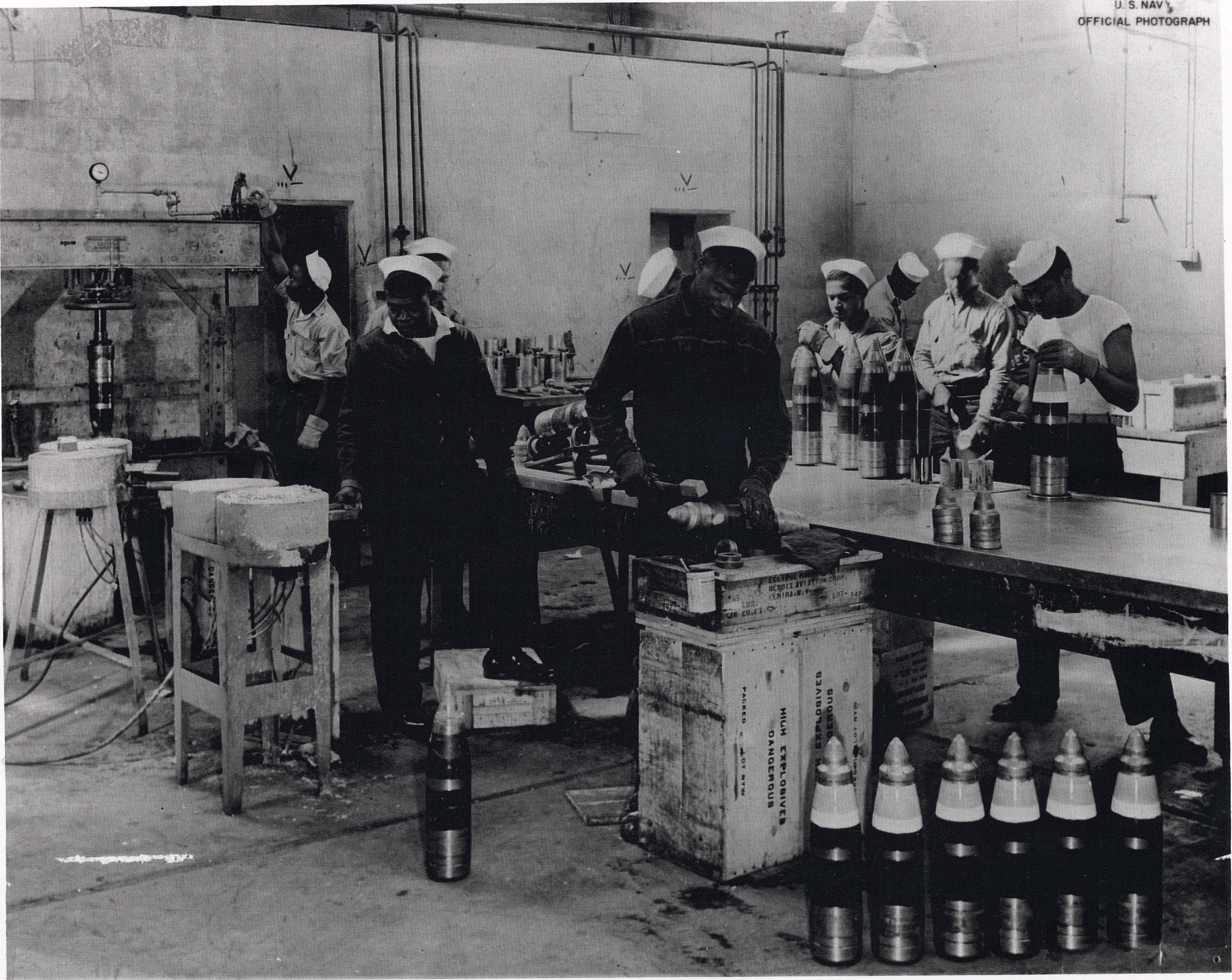
African American sailors of an ordnance battalion preparing 5-inch shells for packing at the Port Chicago Naval Magazine in 1943

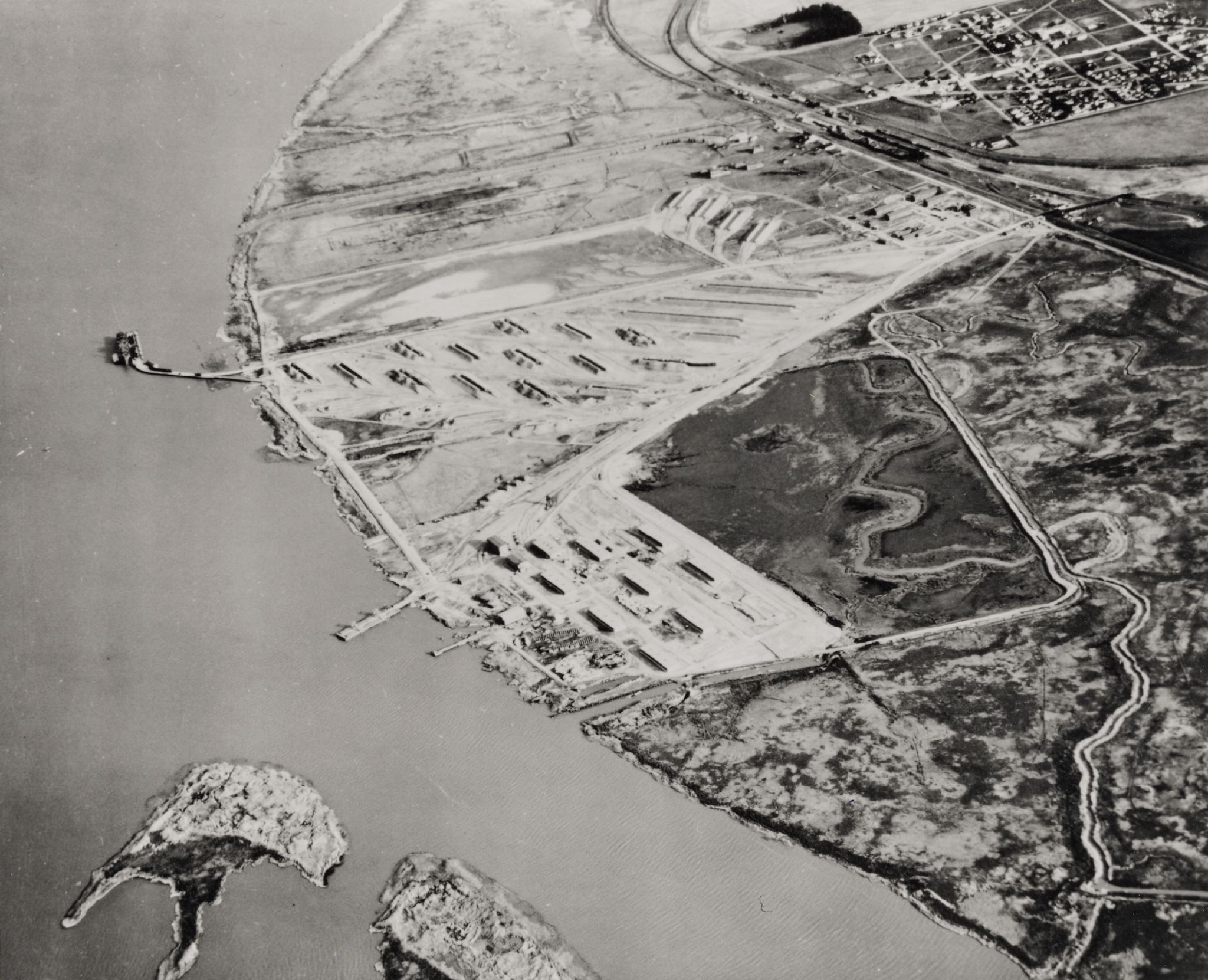
Aerial photograph, looking eastward, taken between 1942 and 1944. The town of Port Chicago is in the upper right. The lower left shows utility and personnel piers extending toward the two sections of Seal Island. The munitions loading pier curves to the left beyond 20-odd revetments. Marshy tidal zones separate the munitions pier from barracks buildings near the personnel pier and near the town.

The town of Port Chicago was located on Suisun Bay in the estuary of the Sacramento and San Joaquin Rivers, approximately 40 miles by water from the Golden Gate. In 1944, the town was a little more than a mile from a U.S. Navy munitions depot, the Port Chicago Naval Magazine, which was later expanded and renamed the Concord Naval Weapons Station. It is now called the Military Ocean Terminal Concord. The original magazine was planned in 1941 with construction beginning shortly after the attack on Pearl Harbor. The first ship to dock at Port Chicago was loaded on December 8, 1942.

Munitions transported through the magazine included bombs, shells, naval mines, torpedoes, and small arms ammunition. The munitions, destined for the Pacific Theater of Operations, were delivered by rail to the Port Chicago facility and then individually loaded by hand, crane, and winch onto cargo ships for further transport. Most of the enlisted men working as loaders at Port Chicago were African-American. All of the enlisted men had been specifically trained for one of the naval ratings at Naval Station Great Lakes (NSGL), but the men were instead put to work as stevedores at Port Chicago. None of the new recruits had been instructed in ammunition loading.

=== Composition of African American personnel ===
At NSGL, the enlisted African Americans who tested in the top 30% to 40% were selected for non-labor assignments. Port Chicago was manned by workers drawn from those remaining. The Navy determined that the quality of African American petty officers at Port Chicago suffered because of the absence of high-scoring Black men, and that overall levels of competence were further reduced by the occasional requirement for Port Chicago to supply drafts of men with clear records for transfer to other stations. The Navy's General Classification Test (GCT) results for the enlisted men at Port Chicago averaged 31, putting them in the lowest twelfth of the Navy. Officers at Port Chicago considered the enlisted men unreliable, emotional, and lacking the capacity to understand or remember orders or instructions.

Black enlisted men at Port Chicago were led by Black petty officers who were regarded by some workers as incompetent and ineffective in voicing their men's concerns to higher authority. Petty officers were seen as having aims fundamentally different from those of their men‍—‌they were described later as "slave drivers" and "Uncle Toms". They and their men sometimes had an antagonistic relationship.

Captain Merrill T. Kinne‍—‌commander of the Port Chicago facility at the time of the explosion‍—‌had served in the U.S. Navy from 1915 to 1922 and then returned to the Navy in 1941 to be posted aboard a general cargo ship. Prior to his being sent to command Port Chicago, Kinne had no training in the loading of munitions and little experience in handling them. Loading officers serving underneath Kinne had not been trained in handling munitions until they had been posted to Mare Island Navy Yard, after which they were considered adequate to the task by the Navy.

=== Speed contests and safety training ===
In April 1944, when Captain Kinne assumed command of Port Chicago, the loading officers had been pushing to load the explosive cargoes quickly—10 short tons (9.1 t) per hatch per hour. The desired level had been set by Captain Nelson Goss, Commander Mare Island Navy Yard, whose jurisdiction included Port Chicago Naval Magazine. Most loading officers considered this goal too high. On a chalkboard, Kinne tallied each crew's average tonnage per hour. The junior officers placed bets with each other in support of their own 100-man crews—called "divisions" at Port Chicago—and coaxed their crews to load more than the others. The enlisted men were aware of the bets and knew to slow down to a more reasonable pace whenever a senior officer appeared. The average rate achieved at Port Chicago in the months leading up to July 1944 was 8.2 short tons (7.4 t) per hatch per hour—commercial stevedores at Mare Island performed only slightly better at 8.7 short tons (7.9 t) per hatch per hour.

There was no system at Port Chicago to ensure officers and men were familiar with safety regulations. Two formal lectures and several informal lectures were given to the enlisted men by commanding officers, but follow-up confirmation of retained knowledge was not performed. Safety regulations were posted at a single location at the pier, but not in the barracks; Kinne did not think the enlisted men would understand such lists. Later the International Longshore and Warehouse Union (ILWU) responded to word of unsafe practices by offering to bring in experienced men to train the battalion; the Navy leadership declined the offer, fearing higher costs, slower pace, and possible sabotage from civilian longshoremen. No enlisted man stationed at Port Chicago had received formal training in the handling and loading of explosives into ships. Even the officers did not receive training: Lieutenant Commander Alexander Holman, loading officer at Port Chicago whose duties included officer training, had initiated a search for training materials and samples, but did not organize a training class before disaster struck.

=== Winch maintenance ===
Powered winches were used on cargo ships to speed the handling of heavy loads. One winch was operated at each of the ship's five cargo holds. During loading operations, the winches were worked hard and required maintenance to remain operable. Winch brakes‍—‌a safety feature provided for stopping the load from falling if the winch's main power was lost‍—‌were not often used by skilled winch operators, as loads could be more quickly maneuvered using power settings rather than by application of the brakes. Disused brakes sometimes seized up and stopped working. The winches on the SS E. A. Bryan were steam-powered and showed signs of wear, even though the ship was five months old.

On July 13, 1944, when the E. A. Bryan, operated by Oliver J. Olson & Company for War Shipping Administration, docked at Port Chicago, the ship's No. 1 winch brakes were found stuck in the "off" position. This meant the winch could be operated freely, but lacked critical stopping capability if steam pressure was interrupted. The ship's chief mate and chief engineer examined the winch, but it was not determined whether the brake was made operational. During loading operations on July 15 the winch at No. 2 hold began making a hammering noise. An application of grease quieted it through the night until its main bearing could be replaced the next morning. On the afternoon of July 17, a bleeder valve on winch No. 4 required repair. Albert Carr, a civil service plumber from Pittsburg, California, was called to replace it—it was his first day at Port Chicago. Carr pulled a broken nipple out of the bleeder valve and replaced both the nipple and the valve from new stock taken from Port Chicago's shop. While at work he witnessed a man accidentally drop a naval artillery shell two feet onto the wooden pier, but there was no detonation. Carr waited until the African-American winch operator tested the repaired winch and then left the pier, thinking that the operation appeared unsafe.

=== Munitions handling ===
The enlisted men were leery of working with deadly explosives, but were told that the larger munitions were not active and could not explode‍—‌that they would be armed with their fuzes upon arrival at the combat theater. Handling of larger munitions, such as bombs and shells, involved using levers and, crowbars from boxcars, in which they were packed tightly with dunnage‍—‌lifting the heavy, grease-coated cylinders, rolling them along the wooden pier, packing them into nets, lifting them by winch and boom, lowering the bundle into the hold, then dropping individual munitions by hand into place. This series of actions was rough enough that damaged naval shells sometimes leaked identification dye from their ballistic caps.

Commander Paul B. Cronk, head of a Coast Guard explosives-loading detail tasked with supervision of the working dock, warned the Navy that conditions were unsafe and ripe for disaster. The Navy did not change its procedures and Cronk withdrew the detail.

== Disaster ==
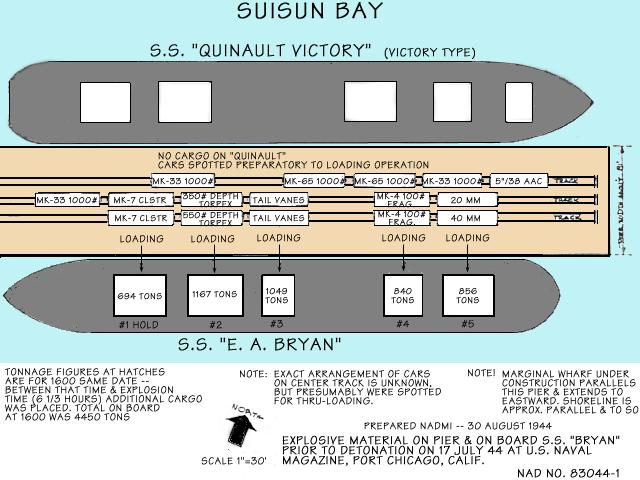
Graphic reconstruction of the pier, boxcars and ships at Port Chicago just before the explosion, with estimates of type and weight of cargo

The Liberty ship SS E. A. Bryan docked at the inboard, landward side of Port Chicago's single 1,500 ft (460 m) pier at 8:15 a.m. on July 13, 1944. The ship arrived at the dock with no cargo, but was carrying a full load of 5,292 barrels (841,360 liters) of bunker C heavy fuel oil for its intended trip across the Pacific Ocean. At 10 a.m. that same day, seamen from the ordnance battalion began loading the ship with munitions. After four days of loading, about 4,600 tons (4,173 tonnes) of explosives had been stored in its holds.

At 10 p.m. on July 17, Division Three's 98 men were loading E. A. Bryan with 1,000-pound (450 kg) bombs into No. 3 hold, 40 mm shells into No. 5 hold and fragmentation cluster bombs into No. 4 hold. Incendiary bombs were being loaded as well; these bombs weighed 650 lb (290 kg) each and were "live"‍—‌they had their fuzes installed. The incendiary bombs were being loaded carefully one at a time into No. 1 hold‍—‌the hold with a winch brake that might still have been inoperative.

A boxcar delivery containing a new airborne anti-submarine depth charge design, the Mark 47 armed with 252 lb (114 kg) of torpex, was being loaded into No. 2 hold. The torpex charges were more sensitive than TNT to external shock and container dents. On the pier, resting on three parallel rail spurs, were 16 rail cars holding about 430 short tons (390 t) of explosives. In all, the munitions on the pier and in the ship contained the equivalent of about 5,000 short tons (4,500 t) of TNT.

One hundred and two men of the Sixth Division, many fresh from training at NSGL, were busy rigging the newly built Victory ship SS Quinault Victory (also spelled Quinalt Victory) in preparation for loading it with explosives, a task that was to begin at midnight. The Quinault Victory had a partial load of fuel oil, some of which was of a type that released flammable vapors as it sat, or upon agitation. The fuel, taken aboard at Shell Oil Company's Martinez refinery mid-day on July 17, would normally be sluiced to other fuel tanks in the following 24 hours.

Sixty-seven officers and crew of the two ships were at their stations, and various support personnel were present, such as the three-man civilian train crew and a Marine sentry. In total, nine Navy officers and 29 armed guards watched over the procedure. A U.S Coast Guard fire barge with a crew of five was docked at the pier. An officer who left the docks shortly after 10 p.m. noticed that the Quinault Victory′s propeller was slowly turning over and that the men of Division Three were having trouble pulling munitions from the rail cars because they had been packed so tightly.

At 10:18 p.m., witnesses reported hearing a noise described as "a metallic sound and rending timbers, such as made by a falling boom." Immediately afterward, an explosion occurred on the pier and a fire started. Five to seven seconds later a more powerful explosion took place as the majority of the ordnance within and near the SS E. A. Bryan detonated in a fireball seen for miles. An Army Air Forces pilot flying in the area reported that the fireball was 3 mi (4.8 km) in diameter. Chunks of glowing hot metal and burning ordnance were flung over 12,000 ft (3,700 m) into the air. The E. A. Bryan was destroyed and the Quinault Victory was blown out of the water, torn into sections and thrown in several directions; the stern landed upside down in the water 500 ft (150 m) away. The Coast Guard fire boat CG-60014-F was thrown 600 ft (180 m) upriver, where it sank. The pier, along with its boxcars, locomotive, rails, cargo, and men, was blasted into pieces. Nearby boxcars‍—‌waiting within their revetments to be unloaded ‍—‌were bent inward and crumpled by the force of the shock. The port's barracks and other buildings and much of the surrounding town were severely damaged. Shattered glass and a rain of jagged metal and undetonated munitions caused more injuries among military personnel and civilians, although no one outside the immediate pier area was killed. Nearly $9.9 million worth of damage ($181.1 million in 2025) was caused to U.S. government property. Seismographs at the University of California, Berkeley sensed the two shock waves traveling through the ground, determining the second, larger event to be equivalent to an earthquake measuring 3.4 on the Richter magnitude scale.

All 320 of the men at the pier died instantly, and 390 or more civilians and military personnel were injured, many seriously. Among the dead were the five Coast Guard personnel posted aboard the fire barge. African-American casualties totaled 202 dead and 233 injured, which accounted for 15% of all African-American casualties during World War II. Naval personnel worked to contain the fires and to prevent other explosions. Injuries were treated, those seriously injured were hospitalized, and uninjured servicemen were evacuated to nearby stations.

== Aftermath ==
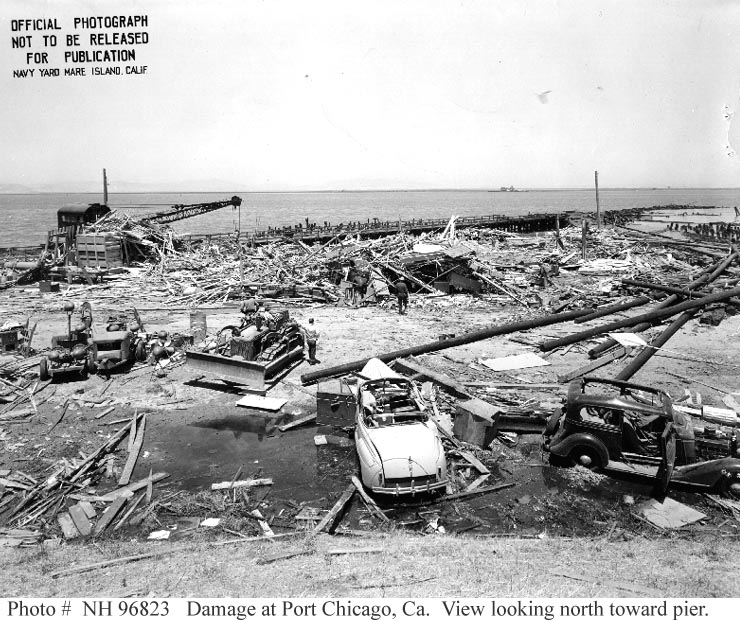
Cleaning up the damage at the remains of the pier

After the fires had been contained there remained the task of cleaning up‍—‌body parts and corpses littered the bay and port. Of the 320 dead, only 51 could be identified. Most of the uninjured sailors volunteered to help clean up and rebuild the base; Division Two was separated into a group that would stay and clean up and a group that would be moved out. This section of Division Two and all of Divisions Four and Eight were transferred to Camp Shoemaker, about 30 mi (48 km) south, where they were assigned barracks duty until July 31, 1944. The men of Divisions One, Five and Seven were reassigned other duty in distant locations and shipped out. The cleanup detail from Division Two dug into the wreckage of the pier and began tearing out the damaged portions. Beginning in August, Divisions Four and Eight and both sections of Division Two moved to the Ryder Street Naval Barracks in Vallejo, California, across a short channel from Mare Island, where they were assigned barracks duties with no ship-loading. The men were in a state of shock; all were nervous. Many of them inquired about obtaining a 30-day "survivor's leave" sometimes given by the Navy to sailors who had survived a serious incident where their friends or shipmates had died, but no 30-day leaves were granted, not even to those who had been hospitalized with injuries. White officers, however, received the leave, causing a major grievance among the enlisted men.

A Naval Board of Inquiry was convened on July 21, 1944, to find out what had happened. The official proceeding lasted for 39 days and included interviews with witnesses who were officers, civilians, and enlisted men. Ordnance experts were questioned as well as inspectors who had overseen previous loading procedures. Five African Americans were questioned, none of whom later refused to load ammunition. Captain Kinne's posted division tonnage results came to light in the inquiry but Kinne stated that the competition to load the most tonnage did not make for unsafe conditions; he implied that any junior officers who said so did not know what they were talking about.

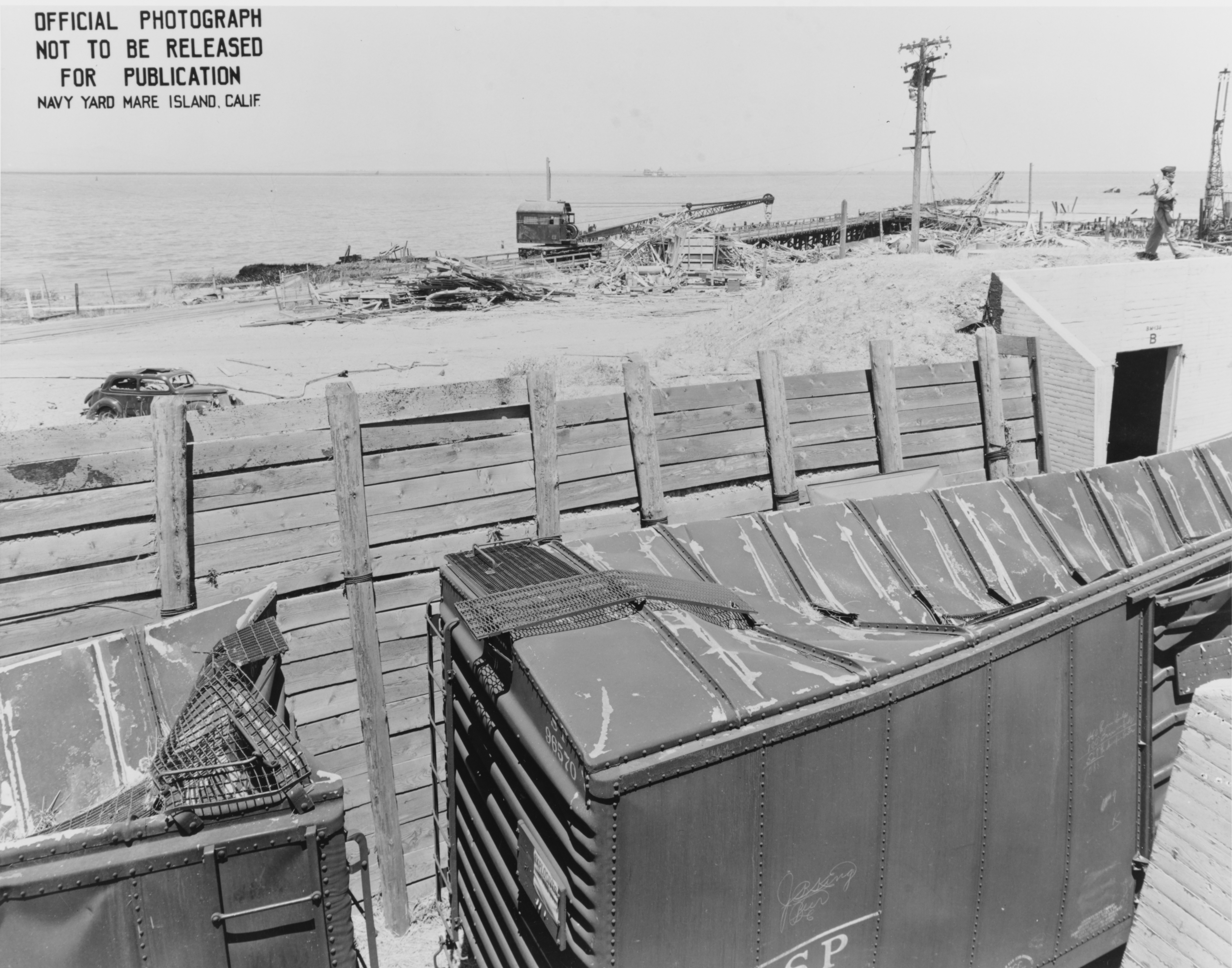
Boxcars within their revetments near the pier were crushed by the pressure of the blast

The inquiry covered possible explosion scenarios involving sabotage, faulty fueling procedures, failure of the moorings of the Quinault Victory, defects in munitions, the presence of a super sensitive element in the ordnance, problems with steam winches and rigging, rough handling by loaders, and organizational problems within the base. The Navy determined that the tonnage contest between divisions was not at fault, although the Judge Advocate warned that "the loading of explosives should never be a matter of competition." The officers in charge were cleared of guilt. The report stated that the cause of the explosion could not be determined, but implied that a mistake made by the enlisted men in the handling of the ordnance was most likely at root. No mention was made of the men's lack of training in the handling of explosives.

The Navy asked Congress to give each victim's family $5,000. Representative John E. Rankin (D-Miss.) insisted the amount be reduced to $2,000 when he learned most of the dead were Black men. Congress settled on $3,000 in compensation. Years later, on March 4, 1949, the heirs of eighteen merchant seamen killed in the explosion were granted a total of $390,000 after gaining approval of their consent decrees in the United States District Court for the Northern District of California.

The government announced on August 23, 1951, that it had settled the last in a series of lawsuits relating to the disaster, when it awarded Sirvat Arsenian of Fresno, California, $9,700 for the death of her 26-year-old son, a merchant marine crewman killed in the blast. She had sought $50,000.

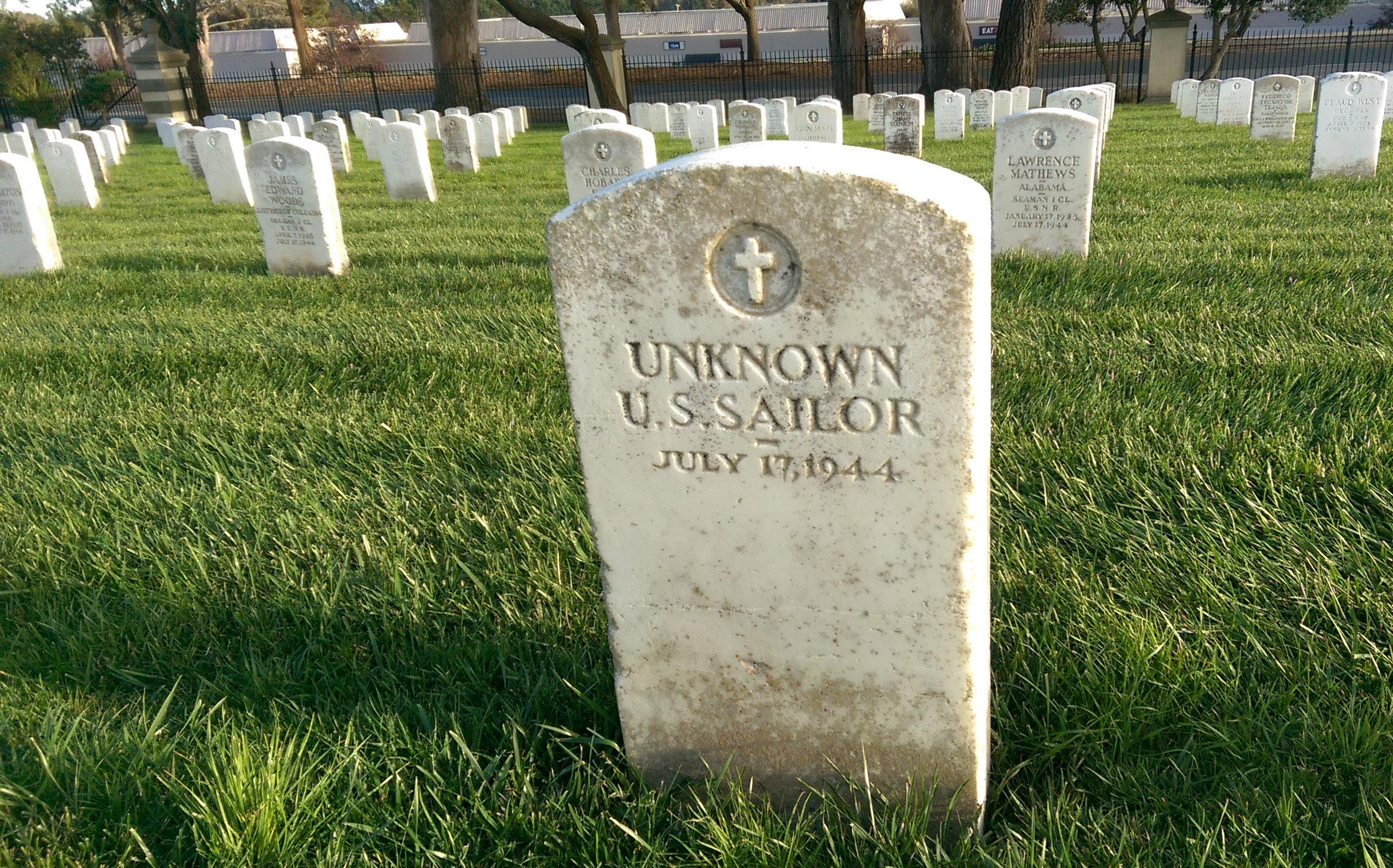
44 disaster victims are buried at Golden Gate National Cemetery

A memorial ceremony was held for the victims on July 31, 1944, at Port Chicago. Admiral Carleton H. Wright, Commander, 12th Naval District, spoke of the unfortunate deaths and the need to keep the base operating during a time of war. He gave Navy and Marine Corps Medals for bravery to four officers and men who had successfully fought a fire in a rail car parked within a revetment near the pier. The remains of 44 of the victims were interred at Golden Gate National Cemetery.

Wright soon began implementing a plan to have two groups of White sailors load ammunition in rotation with Black sailors: one division of 100 men at Mare Island and another at Port Chicago. No plan was forwarded to use Black officers to command the Black sailors, and no plan included any form of desegregation. This was the start of the Port Chicago Mutiny. Wright sent an incident report of this mutiny to Washington, D.C., telling his superior officers that the men's "refusal to perform the required work arises from a mass fear arising out of the Port Chicago explosion." Wright's report was passed to President Franklin D. Roosevelt by Secretary of the Navy James Forrestal who added his opinion that it was "mass fear" motivating the work stoppage. Forrestal told Roosevelt that White units of munitions loaders were to be added to the rotation "...to avoid any semblance of discrimination against negroes." Roosevelt forwarded a copy to his wife Eleanor, knowing of her ongoing advocacy of civil rights for African Americans.

== Port Chicago mutiny ==
=== Initial actions ===
Divisions Two, Four, and Eight‍—‌reinforced with replacement sailors fresh from training at NSGL‍—‌were taken to Mare Island Navy Yard, where there was an ammunition depot and loading piers. On August 8, 1944, the USS Sangay docked to be loaded with naval mines and other munitions. The next day, 328 men were assembled and marched off. When they heard the orders "Column left" and "Forward March" to march toward the ammunition loading dock, the entire group stopped and would not continue. All said they were afraid and that they would not load munitions under the same officers and conditions as before. It was a mass work stoppage, which would have been called a strike if the workers had been civilians.

The Navy would not countenance such conduct. Seventy of the men changed their minds after their officers made it clear that loading ammunition was their duty. The 258 African-American sailors in the ordnance battalion who continued to refuse to load ammunition were taken under guard to a barge that was used as a temporary military prison or "brig", despite having been built to accommodate only 75 men. Most of the men in the brig had not been given a direct order‍—‌they had simply been asked if they were going to load ships or not, and to step to one side if not. All said they were afraid of another explosion. Civilian stevedore contractors were called to replace the imprisoned men in loading the Sangay.

Among the prisoners, Seaman First Class Joseph Randolph "Joe" Small, a winch operator in Division Four, was asked by officers to assemble a handful of reliable men as a team of acting petty officers and to keep the other prisoners on good behavior. On August 10, there had been conflicts between the prisoners and their guards as the prisoners were marched to the mess hall for meals. There was also a brief fight in the mess hall, and some prisoners were seen sharpening spoons into makeshift knives. Small sensed a general air of rebelliousness among the prisoners. To counteract the rising tension and offset the disaster he saw coming, Small convened a short meeting that evening aboard the crowded barge and told the prisoners to "knock off the horseplay", stay out of trouble and obey the shore patrol guards (who were Black) and the officers, because the alternative (White Marines as guards) would be worse. He said to the men, "We've got the officers by the balls‍—‌they can do nothing to us if we don't do anything to them. If we stick together, they can't do anything to us."

On August 11, 1944, the 258 men from the prison barge were marched to a nearby sports field and lectured by Admiral Wright, who told them that troops fighting on Saipan desperately needed the ammunition they were supposed to be loading and that continued refusal to work would be treated as mutinous conduct, which carried the death penalty in times of war. Wright, who had seen nearly 400 of his men killed in 1942 in the Battle of Tassafaronga, said that although loading ammunition was risky, death by firing squad was the greater hazard.

After the admiral departed, the men were ordered to separate themselves into two groups, one for those willing to obey all orders and one for those not willing. To a man, Division Eight chose to obey all orders. Divisions Two and Four were split by the decisions of their men: Small and 43 others chose to form a group unwilling to obey every order. These 44 were taken back to the brig and the remaining 214 were sent to barracks. On the morning of August 12, six men from Divisions Two and Four who had put themselves in the obey-all-orders group failed to show up for work call; these six were confined to the brig, making 50 prisoners in all. These 50 were identified by the Navy as mutineers.

Throughout August, all 258 sailors were taken to Camp Shoemaker and questioned. Forty-nine of the 50 mutineers were imprisoned in the camp's brig. Joe Small was placed in solitary confinement. Each was interviewed by officers, sometimes in the presence of an armed guard. Questions focused on identifying "ringleaders" of the work-stoppage and on what was said by whom at the meeting on the prison barge. The men were asked to sign statements summarizing the interrogation, but the officer's version rarely matched the enlisted man's recollection of the interview. Some men, upon seeing that the written statements did not reflect what they had said, refused to sign. Others felt they had no choice but to sign‍—‌they were being ordered to do so by an officer. Several men refused to give any statement at all. Others spoke freely, thinking that the officer was their defense counsel.

After the interviews concluded, the 208 men were convicted in summary courts-martial of disobeying orders, Article 4 of the Articles for the Government of the United States Navy (Rocks and Shoals).) Each was subject to forfeiture of three months' pay. A few of them were held as witnesses for the upcoming mutiny trial. The rest were split into smaller groups and shipped out to the Pacific Theater. Carl Tuggle, one of the 208, said in 1998 that a group of prisoners, including himself, were assigned menial tasks. After returning from active duty, they each received bad conduct discharges, which meant the loss of veterans' benefits.

=== Port Chicago 50 ===
The 50 remaining men‍—‌soon to be known as the "Port Chicago 50"‍—‌were formally charged in early September 1944 with disobeying orders and making a mutiny.

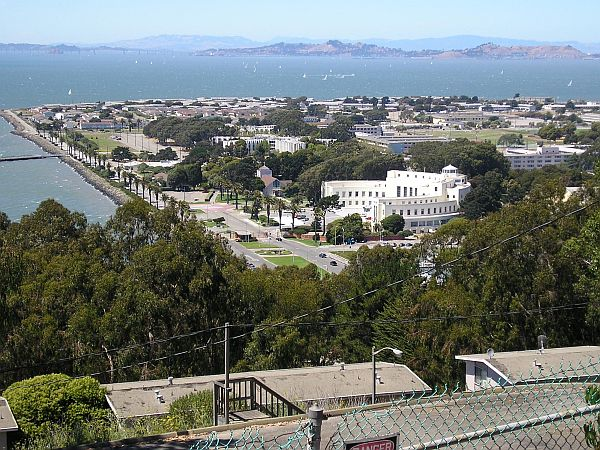
Treasure Island in 2007

The Navy held the court-martial on Yerba Buena Island, part of Naval Training and Distribution Center (later "Naval Station") Treasure Island, halfway between Oakland and San Francisco. Reporters were invited to watch the proceedings; Navy public relations officers gave reporters copies of photographs and press statements describing the trial as the first mutiny trial in World War II and the largest mass trial the Navy had ever convened. Chosen to head the seven-man court was Rear Admiral Hugo Wilson Osterhaus, United States Naval Academy, class of 1900. The prosecution was led by Lieutenant Commander James F. Coakley, who had recently served as deputy chief prosecutor in Alameda County under district attorney Earl Warren. Defending the men were six Navy lawyers, with a leader and one attorney for every 10 men. Lieutenant Gerald E. Veltmann headed the defense.

Veltmann and his team talked to their clients—they discovered that not all of the 50 were experienced ship loaders. Two of the men had never before loaded ammunition‍—‌they were permanently assigned as cooks because of physical conditions making them unsuited to loading. The two cooks had responded "no" when asked if they would load munitions. Another of the 50, who had a broken wrist in a sling, was asked if he would load ammunition, to which he replied that he would not. More importantly, Veltmann sensed that the men had not conspired to seize command from their superior officers. In a pre-trial brief, Veltmann cited the definition of mutiny from Winthrop's Military Law and Precedents and asked that the mutiny charges be dismissed as the formal charges against the 50 men failed to allege that they conspired together deliberately to "usurp, subvert or override superior military authority". Coakley opposed with a brief stating that, under military law, a persistent refusal to work by two or more men‍—‌something that might be called a "strike" among civilians‍—‌was sufficient proof of a conspiracy to override superior military authority and was equivalent to mutiny. Osterhaus agreed with Coakley and refused Veltmann's motion; the trial would proceed as planned.

=== Prosecution ===
The trial started on September 14 with each of the 50 men pleading "not guilty". Coakley began his prosecution by calling officers from Port Chicago and Mare Island as witnesses. Commander Joseph R. Tobin of Ryder Street Naval Barracks said that he personally ordered six or seven of the men to load munitions on August 9 but was unable to verify if any others were so ordered. He said that the men he had spoken with were willing to follow any order except to load munitions; that each man expressed fear of another explosion. Tobin verified that the men were not aggressive or disrespectful. Lieutenant Ernest Delucchi, Commander of Division Four at Port Chicago, testified that he personally ordered only four of the 50 defendants to load munitions. Delucchi described overhearing men of Division Eight say to his men, "Don't go to work for the white motherfuckers" but, under cross-examination, was unable to identify who said it. Veltmann objected to this hearsay but was overruled after Coakley explained it was evidence toward conspiracy.

On September 15, Delucchi continued his testimony, saying that some of his men told him they would obey all orders and perform all work except loading ammunition because they were afraid of it. Delucchi confirmed that a cook and a man with a broken wrist were among the 25 men in his division that now sat among the 50 accused. Delucchi added that the cook and a second man were sailors he did not consider "up to par"; the cook in particular was prone to nervous attacks and was seen as a liability at the pier.

Later in the trial, Lieutenant Carleton Morehouse‍—‌Commander of Division Eight at Port Chicago‍—‌took the stand to say that at the first sign of problems on August 9, he assembled his men and read their names off alphabetically, ordering each man to work. Ninety-six of 104 refused and were sent to the prison barge, but all of these men agreed to work after hearing Admiral Wright's speech on August 11; none of Morehouse's men were on trial for mutiny. Morehouse confirmed to Veltmann that some of his men had said they were afraid to handle ammunition. Following Morehouse, Lieutenant James E. Tobin, Commander of Division Two, took the stand. Lieutenant Tobin (no relation to Commander Joseph R. Tobin) related that 87 of his men initially refused to work but that number was reduced to 22 after Admiral Wright talked about the firing squad. Tobin said he put three additional men in the brig the next morning when they, too, refused to work, saying they were afraid. Tobin affirmed that one of the accused men from Division Two was permanently assigned the job of cook because he weighed 104 lb (47 kg) and was considered too small to safely load ammo.

The next few days of testimony were filled with accounts from African-American enlisted men from Divisions Two, Four, and Eight, who were not standing accused of mutiny. Some of these men had already been convicted of disobeying orders in summary courts-martial. The testimony of the men agreed on several points: that there had been talk among them of a mass work-stoppage leading up to August 9, that some men (none of the accused 50) had passed around and signed a petition to avoid loading ammunition, and that Joe Small had spoken at the meeting on the prison barge and had urged the men to obey their officers and to conduct themselves in an orderly fashion. Some men said Small's speech included words to the effect of having the officers "by the tail" or "by the ass". Coakley was challenged by Veltmann when he attempted to bring the men's signed statements in as evidence but the court allowed the statements to be used to refresh the men's memories of their answers to interrogation.

Coakley summed up his prosecution case on September 22. His aim was to show the court that a conspiracy had taken place‍—‌the mass of accounts from officers and men appeared to support the conclusion that ringleaders and agitators had forced a rebellion against authority. Veltmann pointed out that few of the accused had been ordered to load ammunition, meaning that they could not all be guilty of the charge of disobeying orders. Veltmann stressed that much of the testimony was hearsay and failed to establish a conspiracy or a mutiny. The court, however, seemed to side with Coakley on all points, settling each objection in favor of the prosecution.

=== Defense ===
Veltmann scored a victory at the beginning of his defense: he moved and was granted that each officer's testimony could be applied only to the men they had specifically named as having been given the order to work. In principle, this ruling was favorable, but in practice it would benefit the men only if the court had been attentively keeping notes for each accused man. Instead, reporters observed the court to be drowsy at times, with one judge regularly nodding off.

Starting on September 23 and continuing for over three weeks, each of the accused men was brought to the witness stand to testify in his defense. The general trend of the men's responses was that all of them were willing to obey any order except to load ammunition, all were afraid of another explosion, and none had been approached by "ringleaders" persuading them not to work‍—‌each had made his own decision. Each man said that he himself had not coerced others to refuse to work. Some of the men related how, following the official interrogation at Camp Shoemaker, they had been under great pressure to sign statements containing things they had not said. Some men said that, at the meeting on the barge, Joe Small had not urged a mutiny and had not uttered any phrase to the effect of having the officers "by the balls". On the witness stand, Small himself denied saying any such thing, though he would admit to it decades later in interviews.

Coakley's cross-examinations began with an attempt to have the signed statements admitted as evidence. Veltmann objected that each statement was obtained under duress and was not voluntary. Coakley characterized the statements as not being confessions requiring voluntary conditions but merely "admissions" that had no such requirement. Osterhaus ruled that Coakley could not introduce the statements as evidence but that he could ask the defendants questions based on what each man's signed statement contained.

Some of the men who had been named as having been given direct orders to work testified that they had not been given any such order. Seaman Ollie E. Green‍—‌who had accidentally broken his wrist one day prior to the first work-stoppage on August 9‍—‌said that though he had heard an officer in prior testimony name him as one who had been given a direct order, the officer had only asked him how his wrist was doing, to which he responded "not so good."

At the end of his testimony, Green told the court that he was afraid to load ammunition because of "them officers racing each division to see who put on the most tonnage, and I knowed the way they was handling ammunition it was liable to go off again. If we didn't want to work fast at that time, they wanted to put us in the brig, and when the exec came down on the docks, they wanted us to slow up." This was the first that the newspaper reporters had heard of speed and tonnage competition between divisions at Port Chicago, and each reporter filed a story featuring this revelation to be published the next day. Naval authorities quickly issued a statement denying Green's allegation.

Another one of the men gave the surprising testimony that Lieutenant Commander Coakley had threatened to have him shot after he refused to answer some questions during interrogation at Camp Shoemaker. Seaman Alphonso McPherson held fast to his testimony even when faced by Coakley in cross-examination. Coakley denied threatening anyone, exclaiming that such an idea was a personal affront. Veltmann responded that this line of evidence was news to him, too. The next day, Coakley gave the press a statement accusing Veltmann of coaching McPherson.

October 9, 1944, was another in a string of days consisting of accused men testifying on the witness stand. This day, however, Thurgood Marshall, chief counsel for the National Association for the Advancement of Colored People (NAACP), sat in on the proceedings. Marshall had flown to the Bay Area on a special wartime travel priority arranged by Navy Secretary Forrestal. The NAACP had given the mutiny trial top importance due to the U.S. Navy's policy of putting Negroes into dirty and dangerous jobs with no hope of advancement. Although Marshall was allowed to observe the trial, as a civilian he was ineligible to take an official role in the men's defense. After hearing five of the men defend themselves, Marshall spoke to the 50 men and then conferred with Veltmann's defense team. The next day, Marshall held a press conference, charging that Judge Advocate Coakley was handling the case in a prejudicial manner. Marshall said, that from a review of the proceedings and his conversations with the accused, he could see these men being tried only for lesser charges of individual insubordination, not mass mutiny.

The defense continued a few more days with testimony from a Navy psychiatrist who verified that the immense explosion would generate fear in each man. A Black petty officer under Delucchi testified that he had heard no derogatory remarks or conspiratorial comments and that it had been a surprise to everybody when all of the men suddenly refused to march toward the docks on August 9.

Marshall held another press conference on October 17 to announce that the NAACP was requesting a formal government investigation into the working conditions that had led the men to strike. He called attention to three aspects: the Navy policy that put the great majority of African Americans into segregated shore duty, the unsafe munitions handling practices and lack of training that had led to the catastrophic detonation‍—‌and the unfair manner in which 50 of 258 men had been singled out as mutineers, when their actions concerning loading ammunition after the explosion were not significantly different from the other 208 men. Marshall pointed to the men of Division One who had refused to load ammunition prior to August 9, but had been shipped out and given other duty, not arrested and court-martialed.

Coakley's rebuttal witnesses consisted of officers who had interrogated the prisoners at Camp Shoemaker. The rebuttal fared poorly, as Veltmann was able to elicit from them: that some of the accused men had not been informed they could refuse to make a statement; that some of the interrogations had taken place with an armed sentry standing guard; that very few of the prisoners' explanations that they had been afraid of another explosion had been included in the statements; and that the officers had emphasized portions of the interrogations that would satisfy Coakley's requirement for evidence of conspiracy. Coakley's last rebuttal witness testified on October 19, and the whole court took October 20 off to allow both sides to prepare closing arguments.

=== Closing arguments ===
In his closing argument, Coakley described a chronological sequence of mutinous occurrences, beginning at Camp Shoemaker shortly after the explosion when two and a half companies were mixed together for two weeks. Coakley stated that conspiratorial talk among the men about refusing to work and trying to get out of loading ammunition was the root of their August 9 mass refusal. Coakley described how the mutiny continued in the barge when Joe Small spoke to the men and asked them to stick together. Coakley entered into the record his definition of mutiny: "Collective insubordination, collective disobedience of lawful orders of a superior officer, is mutiny." He gave his opinion that men who admitted in time of war that they were afraid to load ammunition were of a low moral character and were likely to give false testimony.

Veltmann denied that there was a mutinous conspiracy, saying the men were in a state of shock stemming from the horrific explosion and the subsequent cleanup of human body parts belonging to their former battalion mates. He said the conversations at Camp Shoemaker were simply those of men who were trying to understand what had happened, and that these discussions were not mutinous nor could they provide the groundwork for conspiracy. Veltmann argued that Small's brief four- or five-minute speech to the men on the barge was given in the performance of his duty to maintain order, a duty placed upon him by his superiors. Veltmann restated that the established legal definition of mutiny was a concerted effort to usurp, subvert or override military authority, and that there had been no such action or intent. Refusal to obey an order was not mutiny.

=== Verdict ===
On October 24, 1944, Admiral Osterhaus and the other six members of the court deliberated for 80 minutes and found all 50 defendants guilty of mutiny. Each man was reduced in rank to seaman apprentice and sentenced to 15 years of hard labor to be followed by dishonorable discharge. The men were held under guard while their sentences were passed to Admiral Wright for review. On November 15, Wright reduced the sentences for 40 of the men: 24 were given 12 years, 11 were given 10 years and the five youngest sailors were given eight-year sentences. The full 15-year sentences remained in place for ten of the men including Joe Small and Ollie Green. In late November, the 50 men were transferred to the Federal Correctional Institution, Terminal Island in San Pedro Bay near the Port of Los Angeles and the Port of Long Beach.

=== Appeal and release ===
During the 12 days that he watched the court-martial proceedings, Thurgood Marshall began to formulate an appeal campaign, having noticed that none of the men's grievances had been aired in court. Directly after the court closed the case, Marshall sent a letter to Secretary Forrestal asking why only Blacks were assigned the task of loading munitions, why they had not been trained for that task, why they were forced to compete for speed, why they were not given survivor's leaves, and why they had not been allowed to rise in rank. Forrestal replied weakly, saying that a predominance of Black men were stationed at Port Chicago so of course they would be working there to load munitions. Forrestal pointed out that there was no discrimination because other naval weapons stations were manned by White crews loading munitions. The Navy Secretary said that the men had not been promoted because their time at Port Chicago had been a "trial period", and that they were not given 30-day leaves because he thought it best for men to get quickly back to duty to prevent them from building up mental and emotional barriers.

Marshall‍—‌working as special counsel for the NAACP Legal Defense Fund‍—‌determined that the first course of action should be a publicity campaign mounted with the aim of gathering public support for the release of the men. In November 1944, Marshall wrote an incendiary piece for The Crisis magazine, published by the NAACP. Pamphlets were printed and distributed, and editorials denouncing the trial appeared from African-American publishers in January 1945. Petitions began to circulate, collecting thousands of names of citizens who demanded a reversal of the mutiny verdict. Protest meetings were held and powerful people in sympathy to the cause were asked to bring pressure to bear. Eleanor Roosevelt sent Secretary Forrestal a copy of NAACP's "Mutiny" pamphlet in April 1945, asking him to take special care in this case.

Marshall obtained written permission from each of the 50 convicted men for him to appeal their case when it came up for review in Washington, DC in front of the Judge Advocate General of the Navy. On April 3, 1945, he appeared to present his arguments. Marshall's appeal made the case that no direct order was given to all 50 of the defendants to load munitions and that even if orders had been given to certain individuals, disobeying the orders could not constitute mutiny. He said that Coakley deliberately misled the court on the definition of "mutiny" and that the mass of evidence he introduced was hearsay, thus inadmissible. Marshall wrote that "[t]he accused were made scapegoats in a situation brought about by a combination of circumstances. […] Justice can only be done in this case by a complete reversal of the findings." Marshall said "I can't understand why whenever more than one Negro disobeys an order it is mutiny."

The office of the Secretary of the Navy ordered Admiral Wright to reconvene the courts-martial, this time with instructions to disregard the hearsay testimony. Admiral Osterhaus once again called the court to session for deliberation and on June 12, 1945, the court reaffirmed each of the mutiny convictions and sentences. Admiral Wright stuck by his reduced sentences.

Only two of the 258 men had their convictions set aside during the reviews; one for insufficient evidence against them and one for "mental incompetency" regarding understanding the refusal of orders.

After the surrender of Japan and the cessation of hostilities, the Navy was no longer able to justify such severe sentences as a warning to other potentially dissident servicemen and labor battalions. In September 1945, the Navy shortened each of the 50 mutiny sentences by one year. Captain Harold Stassen recommended in October that the Navy reduce the sentences to just two years for men with good conduct records and three years for the rest, with credit for time served. Finally, on January 6, 1946, the Navy announced that 47 of the 50 men were being released. These 47 were paroled to active duty aboard Navy vessels in the Pacific Theater, where the men were assigned menial duties associated with post-war base detail. Two of the 50 prisoners remained in the prison's hospital for additional months recuperating from injuries, and one was not released because of a bad conduct record. Those of the 50 who had not committed later offenses were given a general discharge from the Navy "under honorable conditions". In all, the Navy granted clemency to about 1,700 imprisoned men at this time.

== Political and social effect ==
The Port Chicago disaster highlighted systemic racial inequality in the Navy. A year before the disaster, in mid-1943, the U.S. Navy had over 100,000 African Americans in service but not one Black officer. In the months following the disaster, the Pittsburgh Courier, a newspaper with a large, nationwide subscriber base made up primarily of African Americans, related the incident and the subsequent mutiny trial in their Double V campaign, a push for victory over not just the Axis powers but also over racial inequality at home. The mutiny trial was seen as underscoring the tense race relations in the armed forces at the time.

Late in 1944, under conditions of severe racism, a race riot broke out in Guam at a naval base. In March 1945 a Seabee battalion of 1,000 African-American men staged a hunger strike at their base, Naval Base Ventura County in Port Hueneme, California, in protest of discriminatory conditions. In the weeks following the latter incident, Fleet Admiral Ernest King and Secretary Forrestal worked with civilian expert Lester Granger on a plan for total integration of the races within the Navy. The Port Chicago disaster had helped catalyze the drive to implement new standards.

=== Exoneration ===
Beginning in 1990, a campaign led by 25 U.S. congressmen was unsuccessful in having the convicts exonerated. Gordon Koller, Chief Petty Officer at the time of the explosion, was interviewed in 1990. Koller stated that the hundreds of men like him who continued to load ammunition in the face of danger were "the ones who should be recognized". In 1994, the Navy rejected a request by four California lawmakers to overturn the courts-martial decisions. The Navy found that racial inequities were responsible for the sailors' ammunition-loading assignments but that no prejudice occurred at the courts-martial.

In the 1990s, Freddie Meeks, one of the few still alive among the group of 50, was urged to petition the president for a pardon. Others of the Port Chicago 50 had refused to ask for a pardon, reasoning that a pardon is for guilty people receiving forgiveness; they continued to hold the position that they were not guilty of mutiny. Meeks pushed for a pardon as a way to get the story out, saying "I hope that all of America knows about it... it's something that's been in the closet for so long." In September 1999, the petition by Meeks was bolstered by 37 members of Congress including George Miller, the U.S. representative for the district containing the disaster site. The 37 congressmen sent a letter to President Bill Clinton and in December 1999, Clinton pardoned Meeks, who died in June 2003. Efforts to posthumously exonerate all 50 sailors continued. In 2004, author Robert L. Allen was reported as saying "...even for today it's important to have these convictions set aside."

On June 11, 2019, a concurrent resolution sponsored by U.S. Representative Mark DeSaulnier was introduced in the 116th United States Congress. The resolution is intended to recognize the victims of the explosion and officially exonerate the 50 men court-martialed by the Navy. The resolution has been reintroduced in later Congresses; it was still marked as introduced in July 2024 when the Navy exonerated those convicted.

On July 17, 2024, the 80th anniversary of the explosion, the United States Navy exonerated the remaining 256 men, including the "Port Chicago 50". The then General Counsel of the Navy, Sean Coffey determined that multiple errors had occurred during the courts-martial, including that the sailors were denied a meaningful right to counsel. Due to the exoneration, all dishonorable discharges tied to the courts-martial were vacated.

== Port Chicago Naval Magazine National Memorial ==
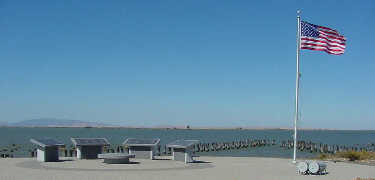
Port Chicago Naval Magazine National Memorial

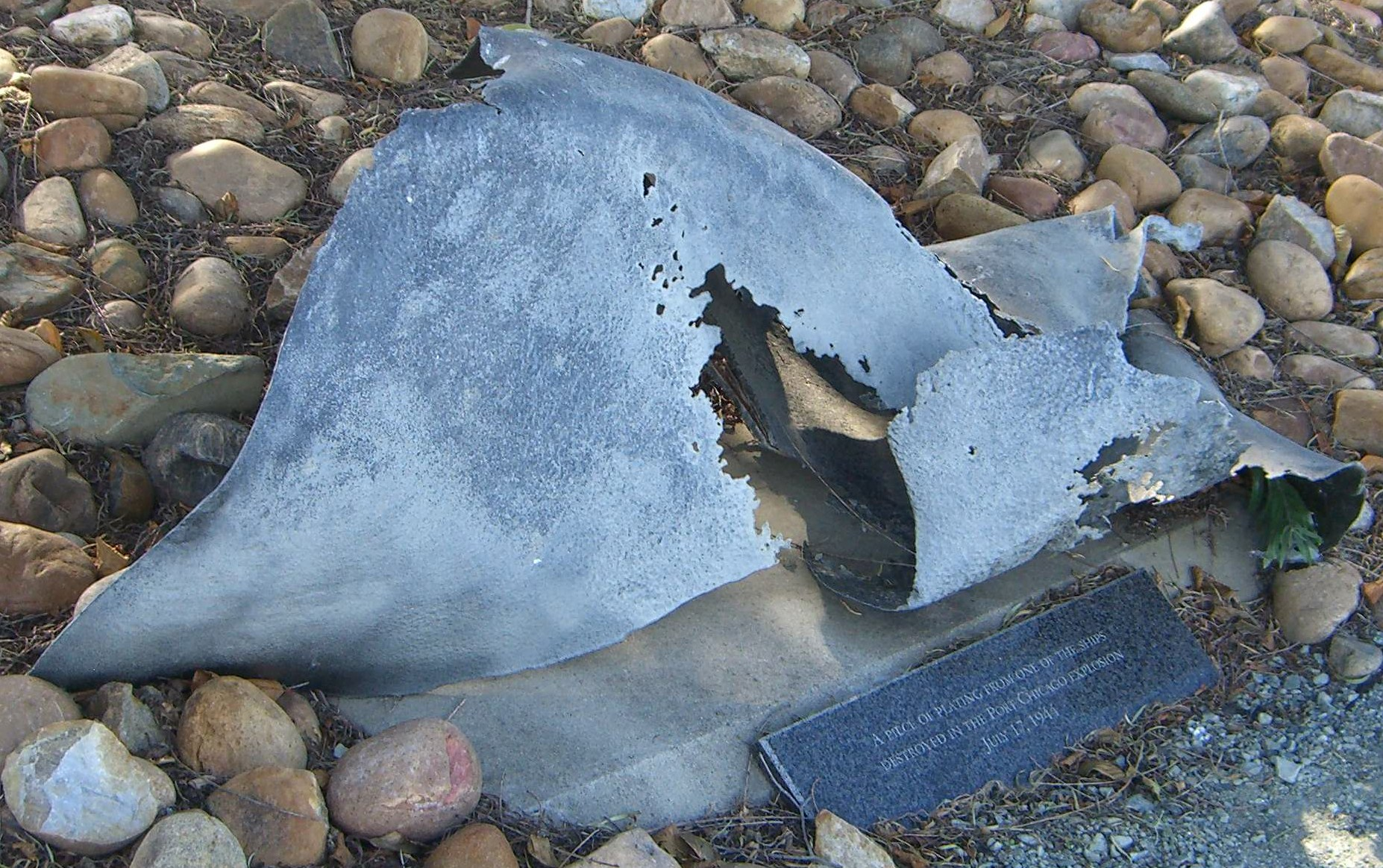
Plating from the ship (photographed in 2010)

The Port Chicago Naval Magazine National Memorial was dedicated in 1994 to the lives lost in the explosion. The National Park Service (NPS) was directed to design and maintain the memorial. Congressman George Miller pushed for the memorial to be upgraded to national park status in 2002, in the knowledge that such status would help the site "become more competitive for federal funds to upgrade and enhance facilities and education materials". This effort did not result in a change of status. In 2006, a local newspaper article highlighted the precarious position of the disused chapel within the grounds of the Concord Naval Weapons Station, a chapel that had been previously dedicated to the memory of those fallen in the explosion. The 1980 chapel was said by local historian John Keibel to be unsalvageable due to lead paint and its dilapidated condition. Keibel called attention to the stained glass windows, which were crafted in 1991 as a tribute to the disaster, noting that they could be dismantled and remounted at the memorial site. In March 2008, NPS was directed by Congress to manage the memorial, after passage of a bill introduced in 2007 by Miller. On July 10, 2008, Senator Barbara Boxer introduced legislation that would expand the memorial site by five acres (two hectares), if the land was judged safe for human health and was excess to the Navy's needs. The Port Chicago Naval Magazine National Memorial Enhancement Act of 2008 was not put to a vote. On February 12, 2009, Miller introduced a similar bill, the Port Chicago Naval Magazine National Memorial Enhancement Act of 2009 (H.R. 1044), which, in addition to calling for another five acres, allowed for the City of Concord and the East Bay Regional Park District "to establish and operate a facility for visitor orientation and parking, administrative offices, and curatorial storage for the Memorial." President Barack Obama approved and signed the bill in December 2009.

The site is contained within an active military base and requires prior reservation to visit. Visitors with prior reservations are asked to allow 90 minutes per visit and are shuttled to the site in NPS vehicles from the John Muir National Historic Site.

In 2021, a new park was planned to honor Thurgood Marshall's invaluable work with the 50 African American sailors. The future "Thurgood Marshall Regional Park – Home of the Port Chicago 50" will be formed from a 2,540-acre (1,030 ha) section of the decommissioned Concord Naval Weapons Station, a short distance from Port Chicago, and will join the park system of the East Bay Regional Park District. A visitor center is planned to describe the dangers of weapons cargo loading, and the racism experienced by African-American dock workers. The regional park will partner with the National Park Service to tell the story of the Port Chicago disaster, providing easier access to the public.

== Media representations ==
In 1990, Will Robinson and Ken Swartz produced the documentary Port Chicago Mutiny‍—‌A National Tragedy, about the explosion and trial. They interviewed mutiny convict Joe Small, his defense lawyer Gerald Veltmann, as well as Percy Robinson, a seaman who returned to loading ammunition after the first work-stoppage, and Robert Routh Jr., a seaman who was blinded in the blast. Danny Glover provided narration for the story, which included dramatized scenes depicting events as they might have occurred in 1944. The documentary was nominated for the Peabody Awards and won an Emmy.

In 1996, Dan Collison interviewed Port Chicago sailors for WBEZ radio's PRI-distributed program, This American Life. The men described how they were initially trained for action on ships and were disappointed when they were not assigned to ocean-going ships. Collison interspersed interviews with contemporary news reports about the explosion.

The story of the Port Chicago 50 was the basis of Mutiny, a made-for-television movie written by James S. "Jim" Henerson and directed by Kevin Hooks, which included Morgan Freeman as one of three executive producers. Starring Michael Jai White, Duane Martin and David Ramsey as three fictional Navy seamen, the film aired on NBC on March 28, 1999.

The disaster and the issues involved were featured in "Port Chicago", a 2002 episode of the CBS drama television series JAG.

The disaster featured prominently in the 2011 novel Blue Skies Tomorrow by Sarah Sundin. One of the lead characters works in the arsenal and assists the wife of an imprisoned "mutineer" in her fight for justice.

In 2015, award-winning writer Steve Sheinkin's The Port Chicago 50: Disaster, Mutiny, and the Fight for Civil Rights was a finalist for the 2014 National Book Award in Young People's Literature. The New York Times called it "just as suitable for adults" and noted that the "seriousness and breadth of Sheinkin’s research can be seen in his footnotes and lists of sources, which include oral histories, documentaries and Navy documents."

In 2017, the events of Port Chicago were the subject of the short documentary Remembering Port Chicago, directed by Alexander Zane Irwin and produced by Daniel L. Bernardi in collaboration with El Dorado Films and the Veteran Documentary Corps.

The September 2022 issue of the Smithsonian Magazine had an article on the disaster entitled "A Deadly World War II Explosion Sparked Black Soldiers to Fight for Equal Treatment", written by historian Matthew F. Delmont. Delmont later expanded the article into his 2022 book, Half American – The Epic Story of African Americans Fighting World War II at Home and Abroad; which covers this incident in detail.

== See also ==
- African-American mutinies in the United States Armed Forces
  - Agana race riot – 1944 conflict between African-American and White Marines
  - Fort Lawton riot – 43 African American defendants in the largest World War II Army courts-martial
  - USS Kitty Hawk riot – 1972 riot between Black and White sailors on the Kitty Hawk
- Largest artificial non-nuclear explosions
- List of accidents and incidents involving transport or storage of ammunition
  - Halifax Explosion – 1917 explosion of a ship loaded with ammunition after a collision in Halifax Harbour
  - HMS Dasher (D37) – 379 sailors killed in accidental explosion in 1943
  - RAF Fauld explosion – 1944 munitions explosion causing 70+ deaths, and an explosive equivalent of the Port Chicago disaster
  - USS Mount Hood (AE-11) – 1944 explosion of Navy ammunition ship in Seeadler Harbor, Manus Island, Papua New Guinea
  - USS Turner (DD-648) – 1943 naval explosion in Lower New York Bay
  - West Loch disaster – 1944 ammunition explosion in Pearl Harbor, two months before Port Chicago
- California during World War II
