= Concord Naval Weapons Station =

US Navy installation in California

Coordinates: 37°59′39″N 121°58′58″W

- Concord, California
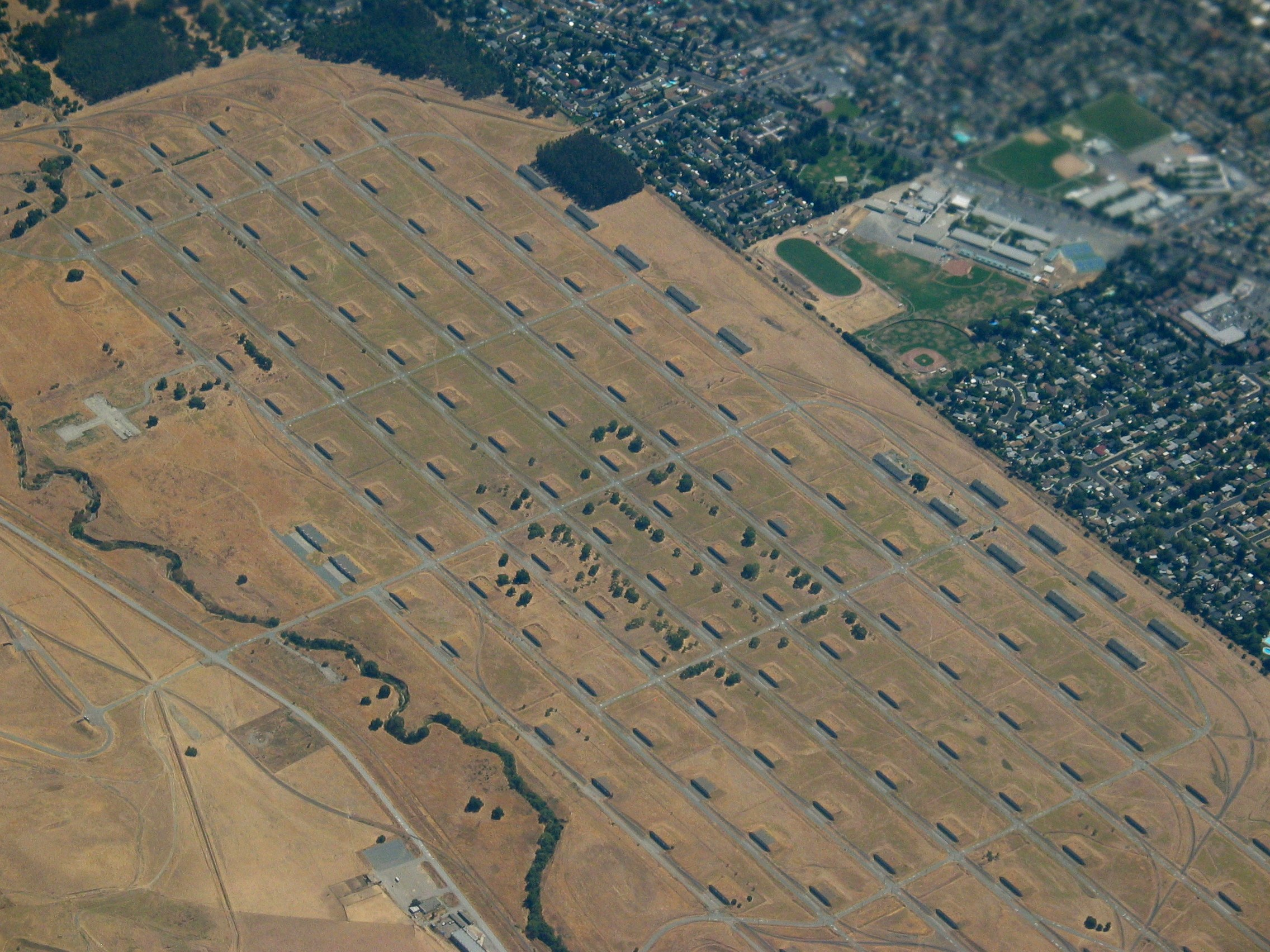
- Aerial view taken in 2006

Site information
- Type: Military base
- Controlled by: United States Army
- Condition: Operational
- Website: https://concordreuseproject.org/

Site history
- Built: 1942
- In use: 1942 – present
- Events: Port Chicago disaster

Garrison information
- Garrison: 834th Transportation Battalion

Concord Naval Weapons Station was a military base established in 1942 north of the city of Concord, California, at the shore of the Sacramento River where it widens into Suisun Bay. The station functioned as a World War II armament storage depot, supplying ships at Port Chicago. During World War II it also had a Naval Outlying Field at the southern edge of the base. It ceased being an operating airfield after World War II. During the Korean War, the Vietnam War and the Gulf War, Concord NWS processed and shipped thousands of tons of materiel out across the Pacific Ocean.

The station consisted of two areas: the Inland Area (5,028 acres (2,035 ha)), which is within the Concord city limits, and the Tidal Area (7,630 acres (3,088 ha)). Because of changes in military operations, parts of the Inland Area began to be mothballed, and by 1999 the station had only a minimal contingent of military personnel and contained mainly empty ammunition storage bunkers, empty warehouses, and disused support structures. In 2007, the U.S. federal government announced that the Inland Area of the Naval station would be closed. The Tidal area of the base was not scheduled for closure and reorganized as Military Ocean Terminal Concord (MOTCO). The 834th Transportation Battalion is the port manager at MOTCO and operates the three piers and an Army-owned rail system that connects with major public railway lines.

The City Council of Concord, sitting as the federally designated Local Reuse Authority, is in the process of formulating a Reuse Plan for the Inland Area that includes residential and commercial development while reserving approximately two-thirds for open-space and parks projects. The Reuse Plan is subject to approval by the Navy.

The East Bay Regional Park District will be receiving 2,540 acres (1028 hectares) of the Inland Area that will be developed for public use. Since then 2,216 acres were transferred from Navy property to park. In addition 2,300 acres will be transferred to the city of Concord, whose Concord Community Reuse Project has been overseeing planning for housing, businesses, a college campus and other development.

== Port Chicago disaster ==
In 1944, thousands of tons of munitions aboard a Navy cargo ship exploded while being loaded, resulting in the largest number of casualties among African Americans in any one incident during World War II. On the evening of July 17, a massive explosion instantly killed 320 sailors, merchant seamen and civilians working at the pier. The blast was felt 30 miles away. A subsequent refusal by 258 black sailors to load any more ammunition was the beginning of the Navy's largest-ever mutiny trial in which 50 men were found guilty. Future Supreme Court Justice Thurgood Marshall sat in on most of the proceedings and declared that he saw a prejudiced court.

== War protests ==
In 1982, at the height of U.S. intervention in the Central American Crisis, Concord Naval Weapons Station was the site of daily anti-war protests against the shipment of weapons to Central America, including white phosphorus. On September 1, 1987, the U.S. Air Force veteran and peace activist Brian Willson was run over by a Navy munitions train while attempting to stop the train by sitting on the railroad tracks outside the compound gates. He suffered a fractured skull and the amputation of both his legs below the knee, among other injuries. The incident that caused Willson's injury were never prosecuted in criminal court, but a civil suit was filed and an out-of-court settlement was awarded.

In the days afterward, thousands participated by protesting the actions of the train's crew and the munitions shipment, including Jesse Jackson and Joan Baez. During the demonstration, anti-war protesters dismantled several hundred feet of Navy railroad tracks located outside of the base, while police and U.S. Marines looked on. Billy Nessen, a prominent Berkeley-based activist, was subsequently charged with organizing the track removal, and his trial resulted in a plea bargain that involved no jail time.

Throughout 1987 and 1988 there was a sustained 24 hour vigil present at the tracks in Concord to protest U.S. support of the Nicaraguan Contras and El Salvadorian "Death Squads." Protesters sat on the tracks and blocked trains carrying explosives bound for Central America on an almost daily basis. These arrests resulted in three different court trials in which one defendant was acquitted and 31 others had their cases thrown out/abandoned due to hung juries. Many more "arrests" resulted in dropped or no charges and varying lengths of jail stay (with no charges).

== Superfund cleanup site ==
The Concord NWS was listed as a Superfund cleanup site on December 16, 1994. 32 areas of the facility were identified as having been contaminated with heavy metals including zinc, copper, lead, cadmium, and arsenic, as well as semi-volatile organic compounds (SVOC) and organochloride pesticides. An area of great concern is the risk to the endangered salt marsh harvest mouse and the California clapper rail. Environmental remediation is underway at the base with some sites having soil removed and others being capped to prevent spread of contaminants.

== Current operations ==
In 2008, control of the site was changed. The Inland Area became a Detachment of the Naval Weapons Station Seal Beach, pending ultimate closure. The Tidal Area was transferred to the U.S. Army Surface Deployment and Distribution Command (SDDC) and is now known as Military Ocean Terminal Concord (MOTCO). MOTCO is Military Surface Deployment and Distribution Command's West Coast strategic ammunition port. MOTCO is the DOD's primary ammunition seaport supporting the Pacific area of operation. The 834th Transportation Battalion is the port manager at MOTCO and operates the three piers and an Army-owned rail system that connects with major public railway lines.

This facility was also used by the Diablo Squadron and Training Ship Concord of the United States Naval Sea Cadet Corps.

The 5-member City Council of Concord, sitting as the federally designated Local Reuse Authority, is in the process of formulating a Reuse Plan for the Inland Area that includes residential and commercial development while reserving approximately two-thirds for open-space and parks projects. City staff are assigned to manage this effort. The Reuse Plan is subject to approval by the Navy.

The East Bay Regional Park District will be receiving 2,540 acres (1028 hectares) of the Inland Area that will be developed for public use as Thurgood Marshall Regional Park - Home of the Port Chicago 50. Formal conveyance of the property was expected in early 2016 whereupon the property will be prepared for public access and recreation. Since then 2,216 acres were transferred from Navy property to park. In addition "2,300 acres will be transferred to the city of Concord, whose Concord Community Reuse Project has been overseeing planning for housing, businesses, a college campus and other development".

In January 2023, the long-standing plan to use the space as an expansion of housing of Concord and neighboring cities fell short. The city of Concord parted ways with the project developer, Albert Seeno III, with fears of what exactly "affordable housing" entailed and how the land was going to be managed. However, in March 2023, Concord City Council is in talks to hire a third project developer in the past two years to take over the project. A more definitive and precautious plan is in the works, and Concord City Council is expected to approve recommended questions regarding the project by late April 2023.

== Self-driving cars ==
In October 2014, the Intelligent Transportation Society of America announced that the Concord NWS GoMentum Station proving grounds would be used to test self-driving cars. According to the Contra Costa Transportation Authority (CCTA), "The public will not have access to the test site, and the self-driving cars will be restricted to the test bed site. With 2,100 acres of testing area and 19.6 miles of paved roadway, the CNWS is currently the largest secure test bed site in the United States". Mercedes-Benz is reported to have licenses to test new driving technology, including smart infrastructure such as traffic signals that communicate with cars.

== Detention camp ==
On June 22, 2018, Time magazine reported the Navy planned to build "tent cities" on the former station site, where up to 47,000 migrants would have been detained. The news was met by community protests, as well as opposition by the mayor of Concord, who deemed the Superfund site 'not suitable for public habitation' and Congressman Mark DeSaulnier, who called the proposal "madness". A few days later, the Congressman reported that two Department of Homeland Security sources confirmed the feared tent cities would not be built.

== In popular culture ==
In the 1996 movie The Rock, the VX gas warheads are supposedly stolen from Concord Naval Weapons Station. The station was not used for filming.

The MythBusters have been seen at the station several times testing myths involving fuel efficiency, among other projects.

== Cattle use ==
During the cold war, parts of Concord Naval Weapons Station land were intermittently used for cattle grazing. The land is still used for this today.

In 2016 ten cows were killed by a trespasser who shut off the cows' water supply while searching for water.

== As a park ==
In 2019, 2,216 acres were transferred from Navy property to park. There are plans to transfer the remaining 324 acres, over 2,500 of the total park acreage will be permanently protected. There are further plans to connect the new park to Black Diamond Mines in Pittsburg using a tunnel originally built for cattle use.

== See also ==
- Mare Island Naval Shipyard
- Parks Reserve Forces Training Area
- Port Chicago Naval Magazine National Memorial
