= 1394th Transportation Surface Brigade =

- Country: United States
- Branch: United States Army
- Type: Transportation
- Size: Brigade
- Part of: 377th Theater Sustainment Command
- Garrison/HQ: Camp Pendleton, California
- Nickname: "SURFACE WARRIORS... ON THE MOVE!"

Commanders
- Current commander: COL Cory F. Henry

The 1394th Transportation Surface Brigade is a United States Army unit subordinate to the 377th Theater Sustainment Command.

== Organization ==
As of January 2026 the following units are subordinated to the 1394th Transportation Surface Brigade:

- 1394th Transportation Surface Brigade, at Camp Pendleton (CA)
  - Headquarters and Headquarters Detachment, 1394th Transportation Surface Brigade, at Camp Pendleton (CA)
  - 1395th Deployment and Distribution Support Battalion, at Joint Base Lewis–McChord (WA)
    - Headquarters and Headquarters Detachment, 1395th Deployment and Distribution Support Battalion, at Joint Base Lewis–McChord (WA)
    - 643rd Transportation Detachment (Automated Cargo Documentation), at Fairchild Air Force Base (WA)
    - 647th Transportation Detachment (Expeditionary Terminal Operations Element — ETOE), at Joint Base Lewis–McChord (WA)
  - 1397th Deployment and Distribution Support Battalion, at Camp Pendleton (CA)
    - Headquarters and Headquarters Detachment, 1397th Deployment and Distribution Support Battalion, at Camp Pendleton (CA)
    - 502nd Transportation Detachment (Expeditionary Terminal Operations Element — ETOE), at Joint Forces Training Base – Los Alamitos (CA)
    - 639th Transportation Detachment (Automated Cargo Documentation), in Concord (CA)
    - 931st Transportation Detachment (Expeditionary Terminal Operations Element — ETOE), in Sherman Oaks (CA)
