= Port Chicago, California =

Port Chicago
- Ghost town
- Location in California Port Chicago (the United States)
- Coordinates: 38°02′46″N 122°01′15″W
- Country: United States
- State: California
- County: Contra Costa
- Elevation: 13 ft (4 m)

Port Chicago was a town on the southern banks of Suisun Bay, in Contra Costa County, California, United States. It was located 6.5 miles (10 km) east-northeast of Martinez, at an elevation of 13 feet (4 m). It is best known as the site of a devastating explosion at its Naval Munitions Depot during World War II. In 1960, Port Chicago had a population of 1,746 residents.

== History ==
The historical extent of Port Chicago lies between the Los Medanos Grant on the east, Monte del Diablo (Pacheco) Grant on the south and west, and Suisun Bay to the north. In a historical review of Contra Costa County published in 1882, the area was described as Township Number Three, lying along the Suisun Bay coast, east of Martinez ("Township One") and west of Pittsburg ("Township Four"), which also included the nascent villages Concord and Pacheco. The railroads which run east and west, including the Southern Pacific Railroad, divided the settlement into two areas: the northern half, closer to Suisun Bay, was reserved for manufacturing, while the southern half was used for residences and businesses.

The land was initially occupied by Chupcan Native Americans, otherwise known as the Bay Miwoks. After being invaded by Mexico, and then transferred to United States control, the area was settled by Anglo-Americans between 1850 and 1851, including Josiah Knight and Samuel E. Strode. The first permanent settler was Daniel Cunningham. The site was granted originally by President Ulysses Grant to H. H. Smith and Mr. Clark; Smith sold his homestead rights to Daniel Cunningham and Clark sold to A. H. Neeley, a friend of Cunningham's.

A shipping dock and smelter for the Copper King Smelting Company was built at the site, which was named Seal Bluff; the facility closed on February 15, 1903. Cunningham's heirs and Neeley sold the land to C. A. Smith in 1907, who built a factory and warehouse for his Minneapolis-based lumber business. The settlement started on November 26, 1907, and several buildings followed, including a general merchandise store and residences, all in 1908. The town, then named Bay Point, was created when the Bay Point Land Company, with offices in San Francisco, filed an official plat map at the Contra Costa County Recorder's Office. To support the war effort, a shipyard was established at Bay Point by the Pacific Coast Shipbuilding Company; the workers were housed in nearby Clyde, a new town built for them.

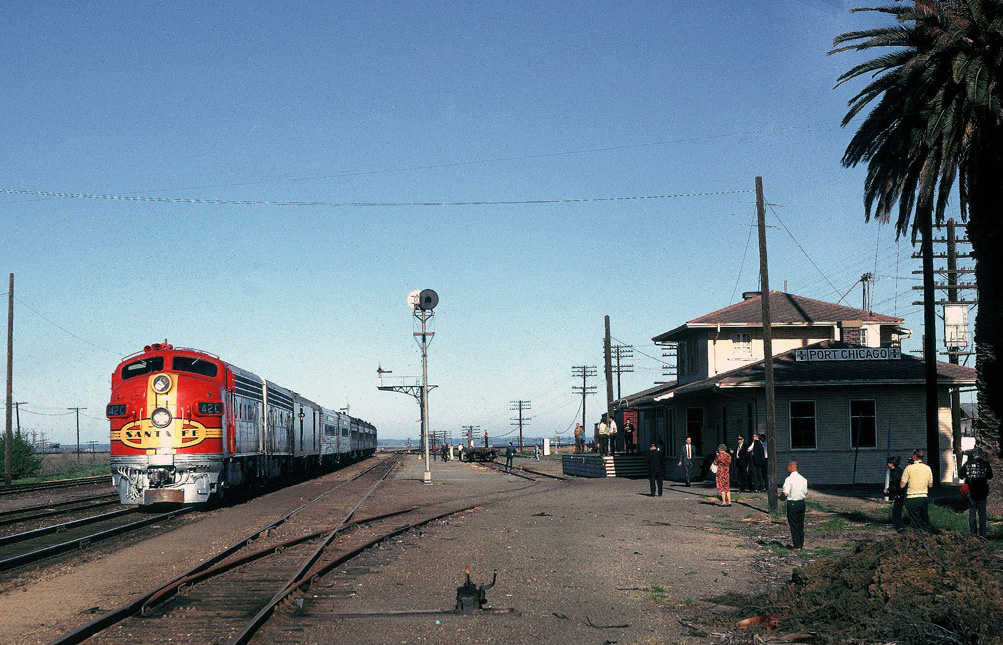
Train station in 1969

In 1931, as the Great Depression worsened, Walter Van Winkle, a business leader, proposed and succeeded in getting the name of the town changed from Bay Point to Port Chicago (after the Illinois city). The Bay Point post office operated from 1897 to 1931, when it became the Port Chicago post office, closing in 1969 when the town ceased to exist.

The July 17, 1944, Port Chicago disaster was a deadly munitions explosion that occurred at the Port Chicago Naval Magazine. Munitions detonated while being loaded onto a cargo vessel bound for the Pacific Theater of Operations, killing 320 sailors and civilians and injuring 390 others. Most of the dead and injured were enlisted African-American sailors. The town of Port Chicago was heavily damaged by falling debris, including huge chunks of hot metal and unexploded bombs, none which would explode. Over 300 buildings were damaged and more than 100 people were hurt, but none in the town were killed.

In 1968, citizens were made to leave the town; all property was acquired and the buildings subsequently were demolished by the federal government to form a safety zone around the adjacent Concord Naval Weapons Station loading docks.

Following the disaster, the Navy built new piers at Port Chicago and acquired 5,028 acres of land inland from the waterfront for additional ammunition storage. The land was acquired to provide a safe distance between stored explosives and nearby civilian communities. This created a large safety buffer around the ammunition facilities, which eventually required the removal of the residential town of Port Chicago. The town's land was absorbed into the expanded military base.

Although the town never received a federal memorial ceremony, former residents gather annually to honor the town's history. Port Chicago Weekend takes place during the last weekend of July at Ambrose Park, Bay Point.

The Port Chicago Highway, a route from the city of Concord through the site of the former town, still exists in Contra Costa County. The portion that passed through the Concord Naval Weapons Station was blocked during the 1990s as a safety and security measure. Today, Port Chicago Highway is interrupted just past the town of Clyde and continues on the other side of the U.S. Army's Military Ocean Terminal, Concord (formerly the Tidal Area of the Concord Naval Weapons Station) in the unincorporated community of Bay Point.

According to biographers Mack McCormick and Alan Greenberg, bluesman Robert Johnson had a cousin in Port Chicago, and his "Sweet Home Chicago" may be a reference to that.
