= Laura Jarrett =

American journalist

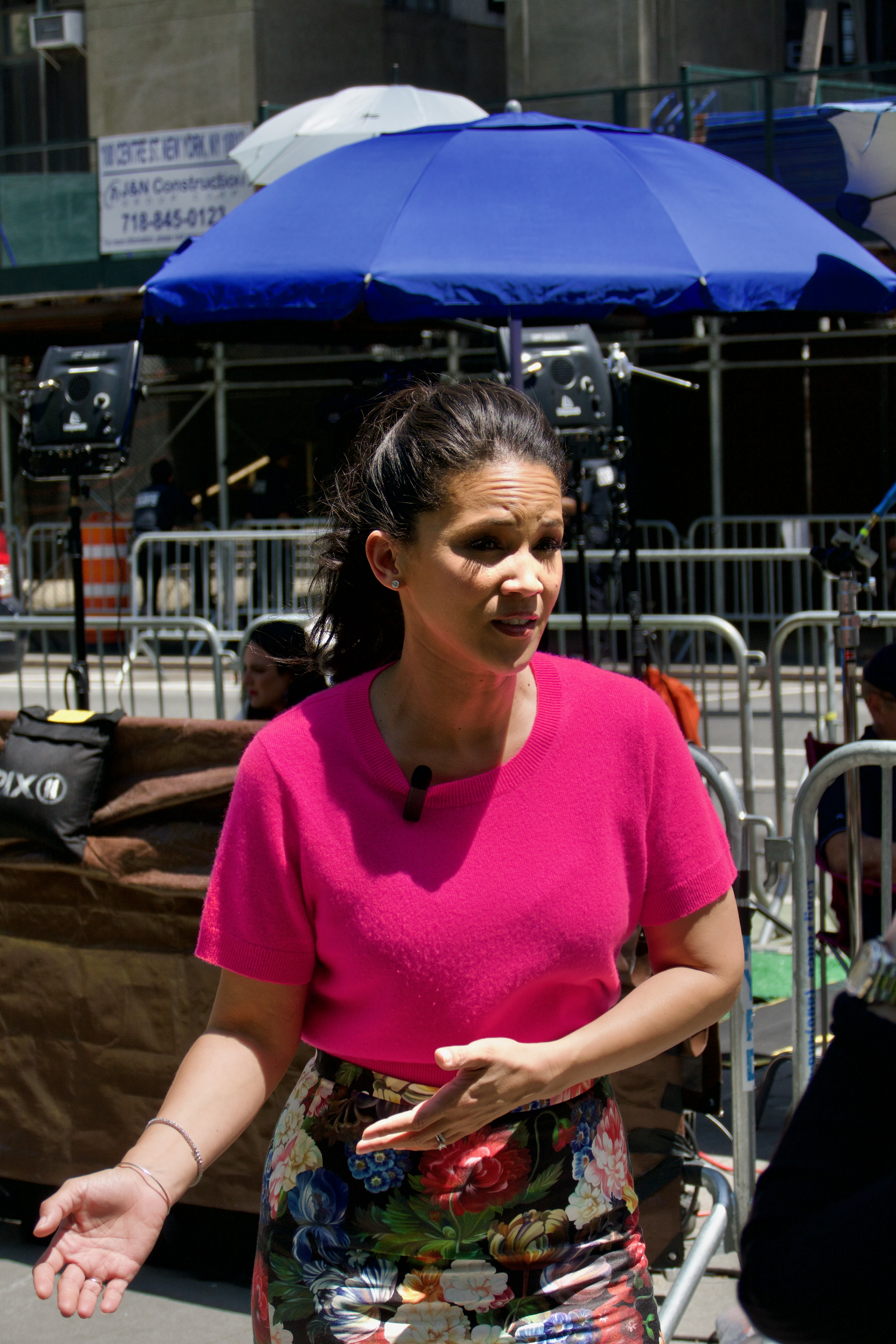
- Jarrett in 2024
- Education: Amherst College (BA); Harvard University (JD)
- Employer(s): NBC News (2023–present); CNN (2016–2023)
- Spouse: Tony Balkissoon (m. 2012)
- Children: 2
- Mother: Valerie Jarrett
- Relatives: Bas Balkissoon (father-in-law); James E. Bowman (grandfather); Barbara T. Bowman (grandmother); Robert Rochon Taylor (great-grandfather); Robert Robinson Taylor (great-great-grandfather); Henry Taylor (great-great-great-grandfather)

Laura Jarrett is an American television journalist working for NBC News. She currently serves as an anchor for the Saturday editions of Today and NBC News' senior legal correspondent.

== Education ==
Jarrett earned a Bachelor of Arts degree from Amherst College and a Juris Doctor degree from Harvard Law School.

== Career ==
Jarrett joined CNN in 2016. In January 2020, she became the co-anchor of Early Start. Jarrett left CNN for NBC News in November 2022. Since January 2023, she has worked for NBC News as a senior legal correspondent succeeding veteran Pete Williams who retired in 2022. She became co-anchor of the Saturday edition of Today on September 8, 2023, succeeding Kristen Welker, who became moderator of Meet the Press. In her role with NBC News, she frequently fills in as a co-anchor across all four hours of Today, substitute anchors and reports on NBC Nightly News, and anchors and reports on NBC News special reports and special events coverage like Election Nights.

=== Reading of Donald Trump verdict ===
On May 30, 2024, Donald Trump was prosecuted on 34 felony counts for falsifying business records. Jarrett is known for breaking this verdict live on NBC News by reading all 34 counts Trump was charged with. Jarrett on Today said that she and her news crew believed that the jury was going home for the day prior to the verdict coming out and did not expect a verdict that day. She was told the verdict in real time from a fellow NBC News reporter in the courtroom.

== Personal life ==
Jarrett is the daughter of Valerie Jarrett, a former Obama administration senior official; and Dr. William Robert Jarrett. Her maternal grandmother, Barbara T. Bowman, was an American early childhood education expert/advocate, academic, and author. Jarrett is of African and European descent Her father died of cardiac arrest in 1993.

She married Canadian attorney Tony Balkissoon, son of Bas Balkissoon in June 2012 in Chicago, Illinois. The couple have two children, son James (2019) and daughter June (July 2022).
