= Maria W. Piers =

Austrian-born American psychologist, social worker, and educator

Maria Weigl Piers (May 17, 1911 – May 21, 1997) was an Austrian-born American psychologist, social worker, educator and prolific author, whose career was especially devoted to the psycho-social development of children. With Barbara T. Bowman and Lorraine Wallach, Piers founded the Chicago School for Early Childhood Education, later renamed the Erikson Institute for Early Childhood Education in recognition of the work of Erik Erikson, a close friend and colleague of Piers. Piers served as professor and dean at Erikson Institute, and brought her particular interest and expertise in psychoanalytic theory and practice to the Erikson curriculum. The Erikson Institute is widely recognized as one of the world's leading academic institutions in the field of early childhood development.

== Personal life ==
Piers was born and raised in Vienna, Austria. Her parents were well known Austrian composer, performer and musicologist Karl Weigl, and Elsa Pazeller Weigl, a well known "lieder singer", a performer of German classical song. Pazeller came from a prominent Catholic family, which included Pope Pius XII (Eugenio Pacelli), her cousin. Pazeller was also very actively engaged in anti-Nazi activities in Vienna, both before and after Austria was "annexed" by the German government in March 1938 (the Anschluss).

As a young child in Vienna, Piers attended the first Montessori school established outside of Italy. Piers noted that the very positive influence of this experience remained with her throughout her career in child development

In Vienna, Maria met Gerhart Pisk, a friend of another cousin, who was then training at the University of Vienna medical school to become a psychiatrist and psychoanalyst. Both were active in anti-fascist politics at the University of Vienna. Maria and Gerhart married shortly after the Anschluss, in the spring of 1938, and fled from Austria to Switzerland later that year, crossing the border on the pretense of taking a day long hike in the Swiss Alps. They were able to immigrate to the United States about a year later, settling in the Chicago, where Gerhart became the executive director of the Chicago Psychoanalytical Society and Maria founded Erikson Institute.

Maria died at the age of 86, in 1997. She and Gerhart, who died in 1979, are survived by a daughter, Margaret Piers, who is a family therapist, and a son, Matthew Piers, who is a civil rights lawyer and the president of the law firm Hughes Socol Piers Resnick & Dym, Ltd. in Chicago, as well as four grandchildren, Shelley Piers VanderPloeg, Nathan Piers VanderPloeg, Alejandra Maria Piers-Torres and Paola Camila Piers-Torres.

== Education and career ==
Piers received a Ph.D. from the University of Vienna in 1939, with a dual degree in child psychology and anthropology. She pursued additional study at Northwestern University and at the Chicago Institute for Psychoanalysis. In addition to Erikson Institute, her professional history includes work with the Department of Public Welfare in Vienna and the Illinois Society for Mental Health, and teaching at the Chicago Medical School, the Chicago Institute of Psychoanalysis, the University of Chicago Medical School, and Loyola University.

Through her early work as a preschool and nursery school teacher in Vienna, Piers became interested in psychoanalytic thinking. She began her studies in psychoanalysis under Eva Rosenfeld, at Rosenfeld–Burlingham School, and there became acquainted with Erik Erikson and his work. In addition to Erik and Joan Erikson, over the span of her career Piers’ work intersected with that of many notable scholars and practitioners, including her close friends and colleagues, René Spitz, Konrad Lorenz, Anna Freud, Jean Piaget and Jane Goodall.

In Chicago, Piers developed and appeared on screen in the very popular Chicago public television show, "Growing Up With Children," in which Piers discussed and provided advice regarding parenting, and illustrated the points with cartoons from Charles Schultz "Peanuts" cartoon strip.

In the midst of the civil rights movement, and the context of school integration in particular, Piers began to recognize the significant gap between theoretical, psychoanalytic knowledge about child development, and the way that parents – especially poor, disadvantaged parents – were raising their children, and the idea for bringing theory and practice together, via Erikson Institute, was born.

Though she wrote widely across the field of child development, in professional and popular publications as well as for television, Piers is especially known for her work in two particular areas – the importance of play as a necessary element in healthy children's development, and the origins of and motives for infanticide.

== Selected scholarly and popular publications ==
Selected scholarly and popular publications

=== Books ===
- Growing Up With Children. Chicago: Quadrangle Books, 1966.
- Wages of Neglect. Co-author Robert Coles. Chicago: Quadrangle Books, 1969.
- Play and Development. Ed. M. W. Piers. New York: W.W. Norton and Company, 1972.
- Infanticide. New York: W.W. Norton and Company, 1978.
- The Gift of Play. Co-author Genevieve Millet Landau. New York: Walker and Company, 1980.

=== Articles ===
- "Character Formation in Youth: Adult Roles and Attitudes," Journal of the National Association of Women Deans and Counselors. Vol. 24, No. I (Fall, 1965).
- "Child Care for Nonviolence." Co-author E. McGovern. Venture Forth (Fall, 1973).
- "Creative Play: The Highroad to Mental Health." Co-author Lorraine B. Wallach. Parents’ Magazine (June, 1975).
- "Dynamics of Early Childhood Education: A New Program." Illinois School Journals (1967).
- "Family Day Care: The Humanistic Side." Co-author Lorraine B.Wallach. Child Welfare. Vol. 52, No. 7 (July, 1973).
- "Family Finances and the Young Child." Child Study Magazine (Fall, 1975).
- "Growing Up Free of Violence." Co-author E. McGovern. Parents ' Magazine (Feb., 1974).
- “Have We Overstressed Security?" The National Parent-Teacher Bulletin (Jan., 1959).
- "The Influence of Early Experience on Marital Adjustment." Co-author E. Neisser. Hygiea (June, 1950).
- "Is She Ready for College?" Co-author E. Neisser. Hygiea(June, 1950).
- "Is This Your Darling Daughter?" Co-author E. Neisser. TheAmerican Family (April, 1950).
- "It's No Fun to be a Goody-Goody." Co-author E. Neisser Parents' Magazine (Jan., 1948).
- "Kinaermord--Ein historischer Ruckblick." Psyche. 30.Jg. Heft 5 (1976) .
- "Learning to Love." Co-author E. Neisser. Parents' Magazine(Jan., 1948).
- "Love Is a Powerful Thing." The National Parent-Teacher Bulletin(Sept., 1961).
- "The Mental Health of the Preschool Child." Mental Health Bulletin (April, 1940).
- "Play and Mastery." Reiss-Davis Clinic Bulletin (Spring, 1967).
- "Playways to Learning." Co-author Lorraine B. Wallach. Parents' Magazine (Sept., 1973).
- "Practicing Overtones." The Piano Teacher (1959).
- "Robert Coles on Erik H. Erikson." Reiss-Davis Clinic Bulletin(Spring, 1971).
- "Raising Good Sports." Co-author E. Neisser. Parents' Magazine(1949).
- "The Role of the Family in Preventing Delinquency." Marriage and Family Living (March, 1943).
- "Surplus Energy: Must It Spell Trouble?" Co-author E. Neisser.Hygiea (July, 1948).
- "Totemistic Mentation and Its Implications for Child Analysis."The Nervous Child, Vol. 5 (April, 1946).
- "What Kind of Parent Are You?" The National Parent-Teacher Bulletin (Sept., 1960).
- "What Leaders Need to Know about Blue Birds." The Camp Fire Girl (March, 1956).
- "When Children Get on Your Nerves." The National Parent-Teacher Bulletin (April, 1964).
- "When You Have Problems." The International Altrusan (194 7).
- "When Your Child Makes You Angry." Co-author E. Neisser. Parents' Magazine (May, 1948).
- "Who's Afraid." Parents' Magazine (June, 1949).
- "Zur Psychologic der Toafeindschaft." Imago. Vol. 25, No. 2 (1940).

=== Media contributions ===
- Children Growing I, Children Growing II, and About People, for National Educational Television

== Awards ==
- Immigrant of the Year Award (with husband Gerhardt Piers), Immigrant Protective Association, 1964
- Myrtle Wreath Award, Hadassah, 1971
- Young Women's Christian Association Leadership Award, 1972
- Operation PUSH Award for achievements in the field of education, 1975
- D.H.L., Loyola University Chicago, 1978
