= Craig Winston Lecroy =

- Medical career
- Profession: Professor
- Field: Adolesence, Child Abuse, Home Visitation
- Institutions: Arizona State University
- Research: Mental Health

Craig Winston LeCroy is a Communitas Professor of Social Work, School of Social Work at Arizona State University.

== Early life and education ==
LeCroy holds a B.S.W. awarded in 1978 from San Jose State University. Later in 1980 he has completed his M.S.W. from Western Michigan University. In 1983, he completed his Ph.D. from University of Wisconsin-Madison in Social Welfare with a minor in Educational Psychology. In 2003 LeCroy was the Zellerbach Visiting professor at UC Berkeley and in 2004 he was a visiting professor at the University of Canterbury, New Zealand. LeCroy has been a professor at Arizona State University since 1984.

== Career ==
LeCroy began his career as a social worker and worked with different organizations including Catholic Social Services, The Bridge Outpatient Community Mental Health, Learning House, San Jose Hospital, Kalamazoo Consultation Center, and the Interpersonal Skills Training Project. He was also a Field Supervisor in University of Wisconsin from 1981 to 1983. In 1992-1997 he was Program Supervisor, Center for Substance Abuse Prevention at Arizona State University Training Program. He was also an assistant professor in Illinois State University from 1983 to 1984. Currently he is the Communitas Professor of Social Work, Watts College of Public Service and Community Solutions, School of Social Work, Arizona State University. and holds courtesy appointments as Clinical Professor of Pediatrics, College of Medicine, University of Arizona, 2012, and Professor, John & Doris Norton School of Family and Consumer Sciences, Family Studies and Human Development, University of Arizona.

== Academic work ==
Professor LeCroy has focused his research in the areas of home visitation services, social competence in adolescence, and evidence-based practice for social work. Some of his work includes: a widely implemented prevention program for adolescent females, Go Grrrls that was published by W. W. Norton, the Healthy Families Parenting Inventory, an outcome instrument for the evaluation of home visitation programs, and an in-depth study of parenting mentally ill children, Parenting Mentally Ill Children: Faith, caring, support, and surviving the system (ABC-CLIO). LeCroy is the author of 15 books and more than 100 articles and book chapters. He was elected Fellow, American Psychological Association, Society for Clinical Child and Adolescent Psychology, and the Society for Social Work Research. He gave the Aaron Rosen Lecture at the Society for Social Work Research in 2019.

== Honors and awards ==
- Awarded the Aaron Rosen Lecture, Society for Social Work Research, 2019
- Elected Fellow, Society for Clinical Child and Adolescent Psychology, American Psychological Association, Division 53, 2019
- Child Welfare Dissertation Award awarded to Cara Kelly, my doctoral student, 2019
- Nominated, Outstanding Faculty Mentor Award, 2018
- Elected Fellow, American Academy of Social Work & Social Welfare, 2017 Nominated Martha Rothman Lifetime Achievement Award, 2017
- Elected Fellow, American Psychological Association, 2016
- Research Service Award; Prevent Child Abuse America, 2016
- Lifetime Achievement Award, NASW Branch II, 2012
- Elected Board Member, University of Wisconsin, School of Social Work, 2015
- Nominated for the William James Book Award (Parenting Mentally Ill Children: Faith, Hope, Support, and Surviving the System).
- Appointment, Clinical Professor of Pediatrics, College of Medicine, University of Arizona, 2012
- Courtesy Appointment, Professor, John and Doris Norton School, Family
- Studies and Human Development, University of Arizona, Tucson, AZ, 2005.
