= Valerie Jarrett =

American businesswoman and former government official (born 1956)

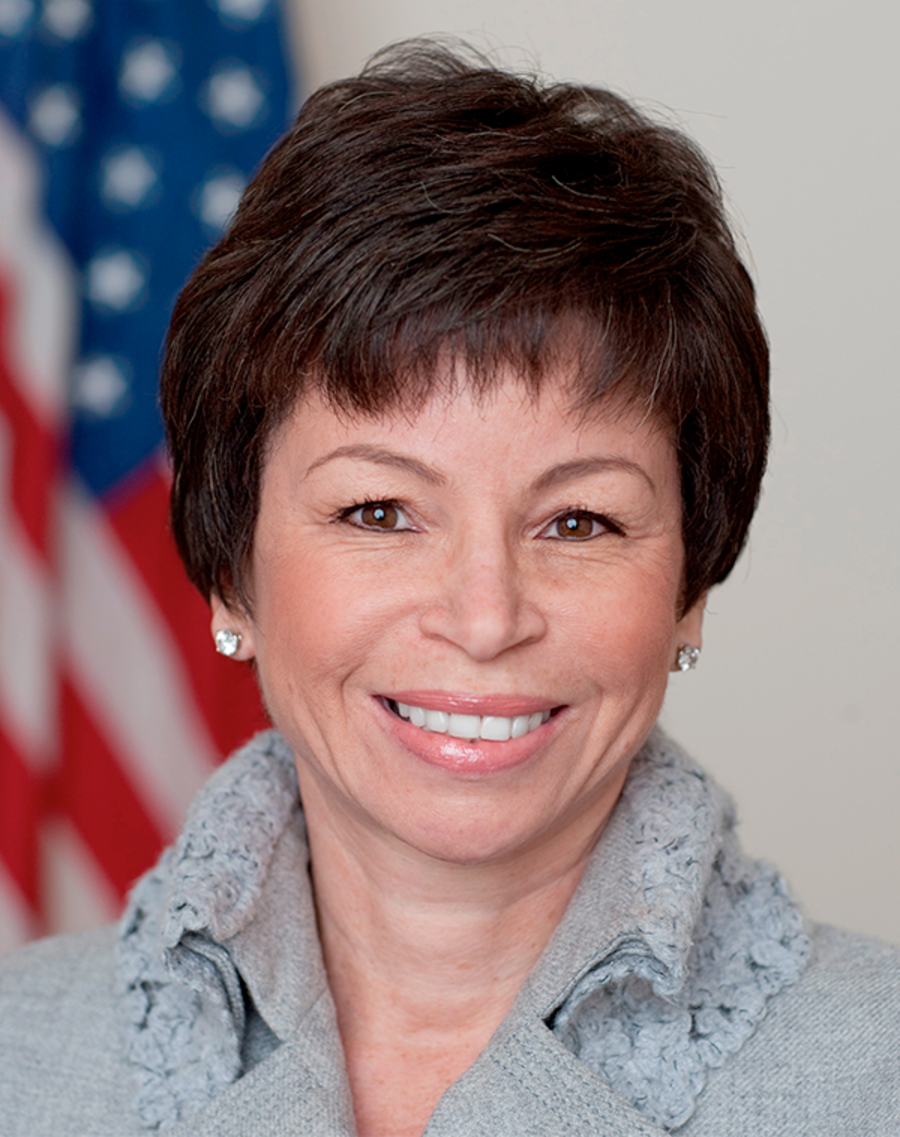
- Official portrait, 2009

CEO of the Obama Foundation
- Incumbent
- Assumed office October 1, 2021
- Preceded by: David Simas

Acting President of the Obama Foundation
- In office March 25, 2021 – October 1, 2021
- Preceded by: Wally Adeyemo
- Succeeded by: David Simas

Director of the Office of Public Engagement and Intergovernmental Affairs
- In office January 20, 2009 – January 20, 2017
- President: Barack Obama
- Preceded by: Julie E. Cram (Public Liaison); Janet Creighton (Intergovernmental Affairs)
- Succeeded by: George Sifakis (Public Liaison); Justin R. Clark (Intergovernmental Affairs)

Senior Advisor to the President
- In office January 20, 2009 – January 20, 2017
- President: Barack Obama
- Preceded by: Barry Jackson
- Succeeded by: Jared Kushner; Stephen Miller

Personal details
- Born: Valerie June Bowman; November 14, 1956 (age 70) Shiraz, Iran
- Party: Democratic
- Spouse: William Jarrett (m. 1983; div. 1988)
- Children: Laura Jarrett
- Parents: James E. Bowman; Barbara T. Bowman
- Education: Stanford University (BA); University of Michigan (JD)

Valerie June Jarrett (née Bowman; born November 14, 1956) is an American businesswoman, attorney and former government official who has been the chief executive officer of the Obama Foundation since 2021. She was the longest-serving senior advisor to President Barack Obama. She headed his White House Office of Public Engagement and Intergovernmental Affairs and chaired the White House Council on Women and Girls. Before serving in the White House, she was the chief executive officer of property developer The Habitat Company and a co-chair of the Obama–Biden Transition Project.

== Early life and education ==
Jarrett was born in Shiraz, Iran, during the Shah's rule, to American parents James E. Bowman and Barbara T. Bowman. Her father, a pathologist and geneticist from Chicago, worked on regional health systems based at hospital in Shiraz in the 1950s. When she was five years old, the family moved to London for a year, then moved back to Chicago in 1962.

Jarrett's father was the first African American to have a medical residency at St Luke's hospital in Chicago, and after his return to the US, to get professorial tenure at the University of Chicago medical school. Her maternal great-grandfather, Robert Robinson Taylor, was the first accredited African-American architect, and the first African-American student to enroll at the Massachusetts Institute of Technology. Her maternal grandfather, Robert Rochon Taylor, was chairman of the Chicago Housing Authority in the 1940s.

As a child, Jarrett spoke Persian, French, and English. She and her family would travel several times to Africa for her father's work in medical development. Her mother was one of four children's advocates who created the Erikson Institute in 1966. The institute was established to expand collective knowledge of child development for teachers and other professionals working with young children.

Jarrett went to the University of Chicago Lab School, then she graduated from Northfield Mount Hermon School in 1974. She earned a B.A. in psychology from Stanford University in 1978 and a Juris Doctor (J.D.) from the University of Michigan Law School in 1981.

== Career ==
After graduating from law school, Jarrett returned to Chicago and worked as an attorney in finance and real estate law in the private sector.

=== Chicago municipal politics ===
Jarrett got her start in Chicago's city hall in 1987 working for Mayor Harold Washington as Deputy Corporation Counsel for finance and development.

Jarrett continued to work in the mayor's office in the 1990s, moving from the law department into public administration. She was deputy chief of staff for Mayor Richard Daley, during which time (1991) she hired Michelle Robinson (who was then engaged to Barack Obama) from Sidley Austin. Jarrett served as commissioner of the department of planning and development from 1991 through 1995.

=== Business administration ===
From 1995 to 2009, Jarrett was the CEO of The Habitat Company, a real estate development and management company. Daniel E. Levin was the chairman of Habitat, which was formed in 1971. Jarrett was a member of the board of Chicago Stock Exchange (2000–2007, as chairman, 2004–2007).

During her time at Habitat, Jarrett was also a member of the board of trustees of the University of Chicago Medical Center, becoming vice chairwoman in 2002 and chairwoman in 2006. She also was chairwoman of the Chicago Transit Authority and vice chairwoman of the board of trustees of the University of Chicago. She was a trustee of the Museum of Science and Industry in Chicago and a board member of the Federal Reserve Bank of Chicago. Jarrett is on the board of directors of USG Corporation, a Chicago-based building materials corporation.

=== Advisor to Barack Obama ===
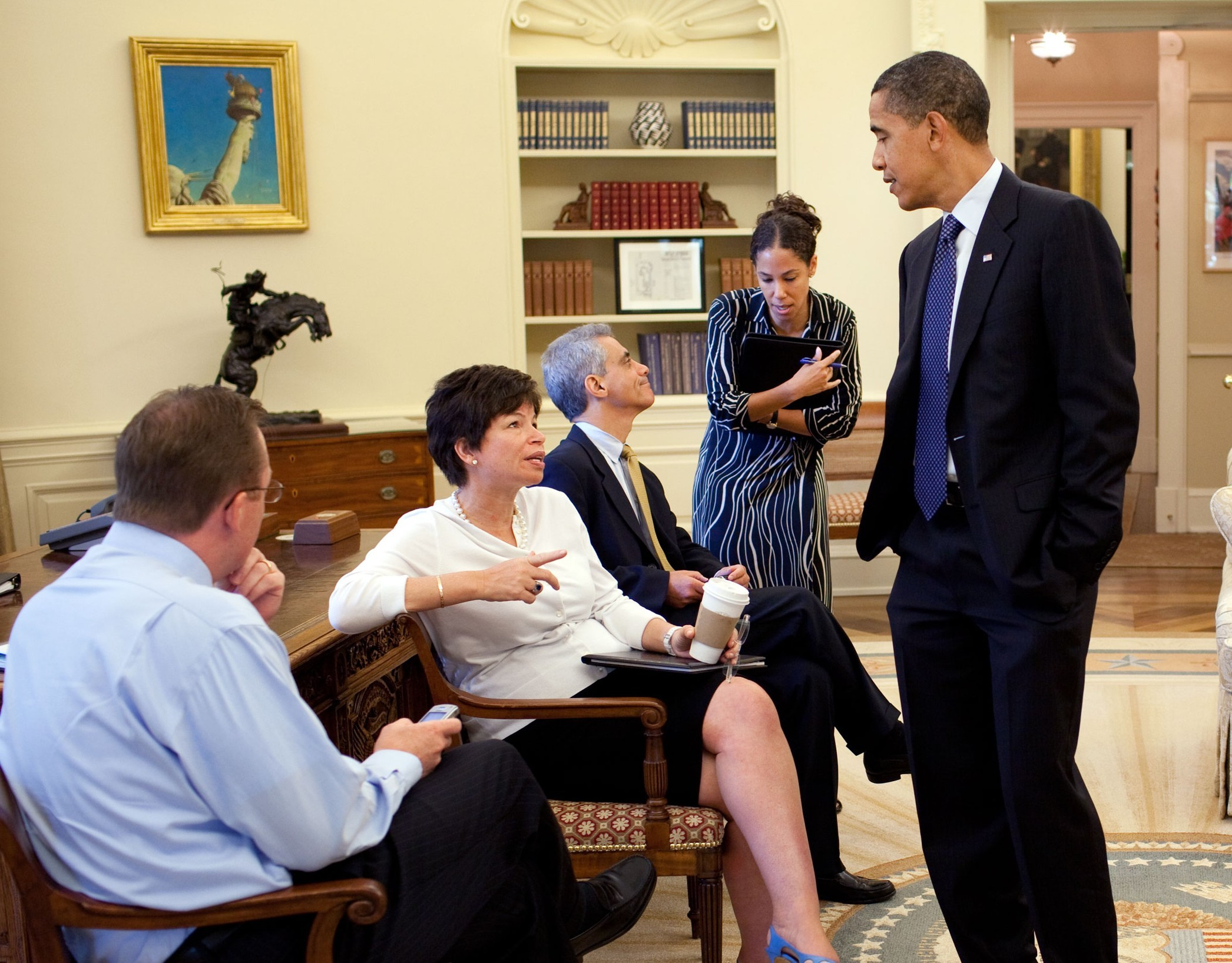
Obama speaks to Jarrett and other staff, August 2009

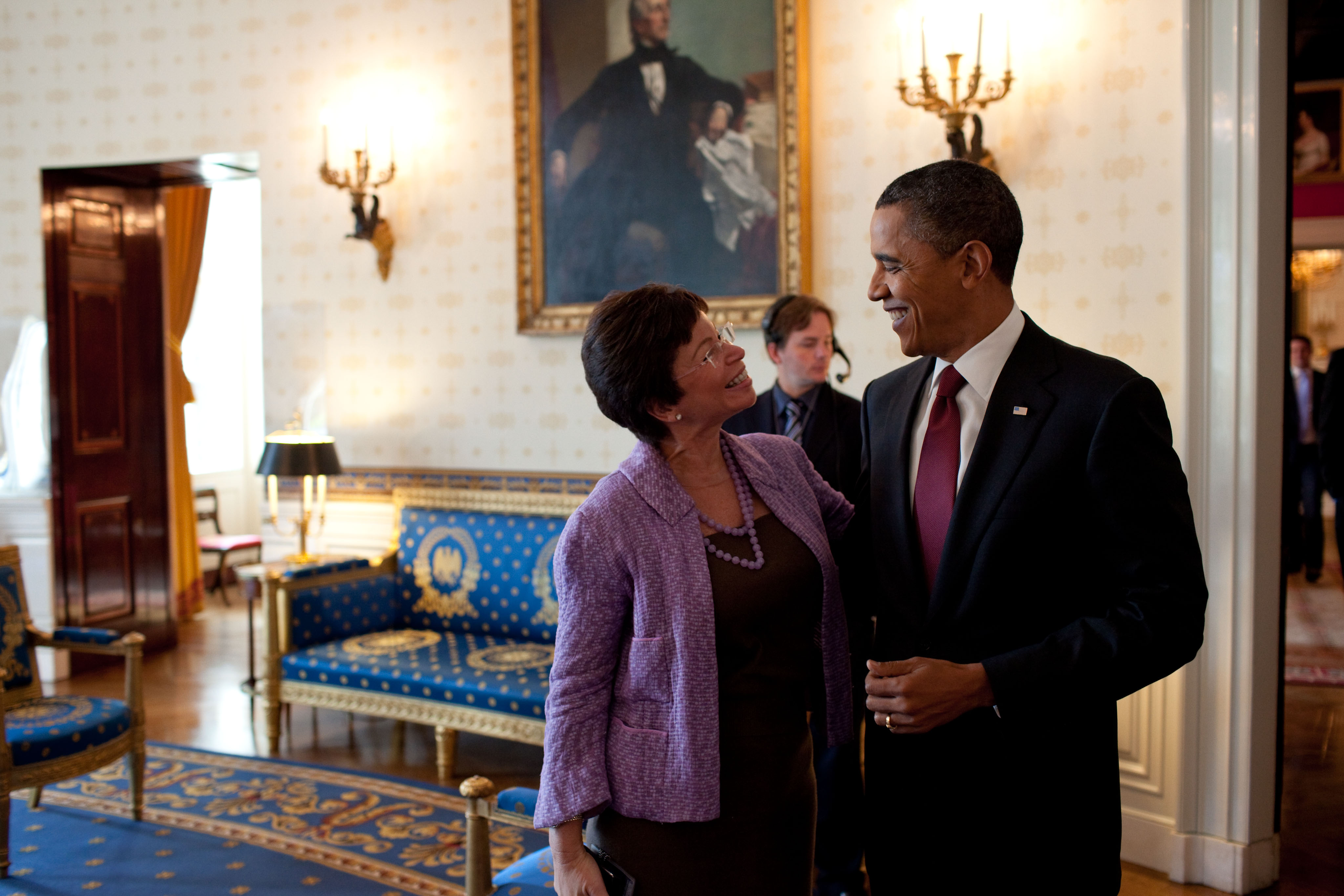
Barack Obama and Valerie Jarrett converse in the Blue Room, White House, 2010

Jarrett was President Obama's longest serving advisor, confidante and was "widely tipped for a high-profile position in an Obama administration". The Wall Street Journal's Douglas Belkin was quoted saying

Unlike Bert Lance, who arrived from Georgia with President [Jimmy] Carter and became his budget director, or Karen Hughes, who was President [George W.] Bush's communications manager, Ms. Jarrett isn't a confidante with a particular portfolio. What she does share with these counterparts is a fierce sense of loyalty and a refusal to publicly say anything that may reflect poorly on the candidate—or steal his thunder.

On November 14, 2008, President-elect Obama selected Jarrett as a senior advisor to the president and assistant to the president for intergovernmental relations and public liaison.

Jarrett was one of three senior advisors to Obama. She held the retitled position of assistant to the president for intergovernmental affairs and public engagement, managed the White House Office of Public Engagement and Intergovernmental Affairs, and Office of Urban Affairs; she also chaired the White House Council on Women and Girls and the White House Office of Olympic, Paralympic, and Youth Sport. She was part of the United States state visit to the United Kingdom in May 2011.

She said that the 2011 report Women in America, which the administration produced for the Council on Women and Girls, would be used to guide policy-making.

Jarrett had a staff of approximately three dozen and received full-time Secret Service protection. Jarrett's role as both a friend of the Obamas and as senior advisor in the White House was controversial: in his memoirs Robert M. Gates, former secretary of defense, discussed his objection to her involvement in foreign security affairs; David Axelrod reported in his memoirs about Obama's first chief of staff, Rahm Emanuel's attempts to have her selected as Obama's replacement in the United States Senate, due to concerns about the potential difficulty in working with a family friend in a major policy role.

=== Additional leadership positions ===
In addition to being senior advisor to the president, Jarrett held other leadership positions and completed further duties. Among those included chairing the White House Council on Women and Girls and co-chairing the White House Task Force to Protect Students from Sexual Assault. In March 2014, she participated as a speaker on Voices in Leadership, an original Harvard T. H. Chan School of Public Health webcast series, in a discussion entitled, "Leadership in the White House," moderated by Dr. Atul Gawande.

=== Relationship with the Obamas ===
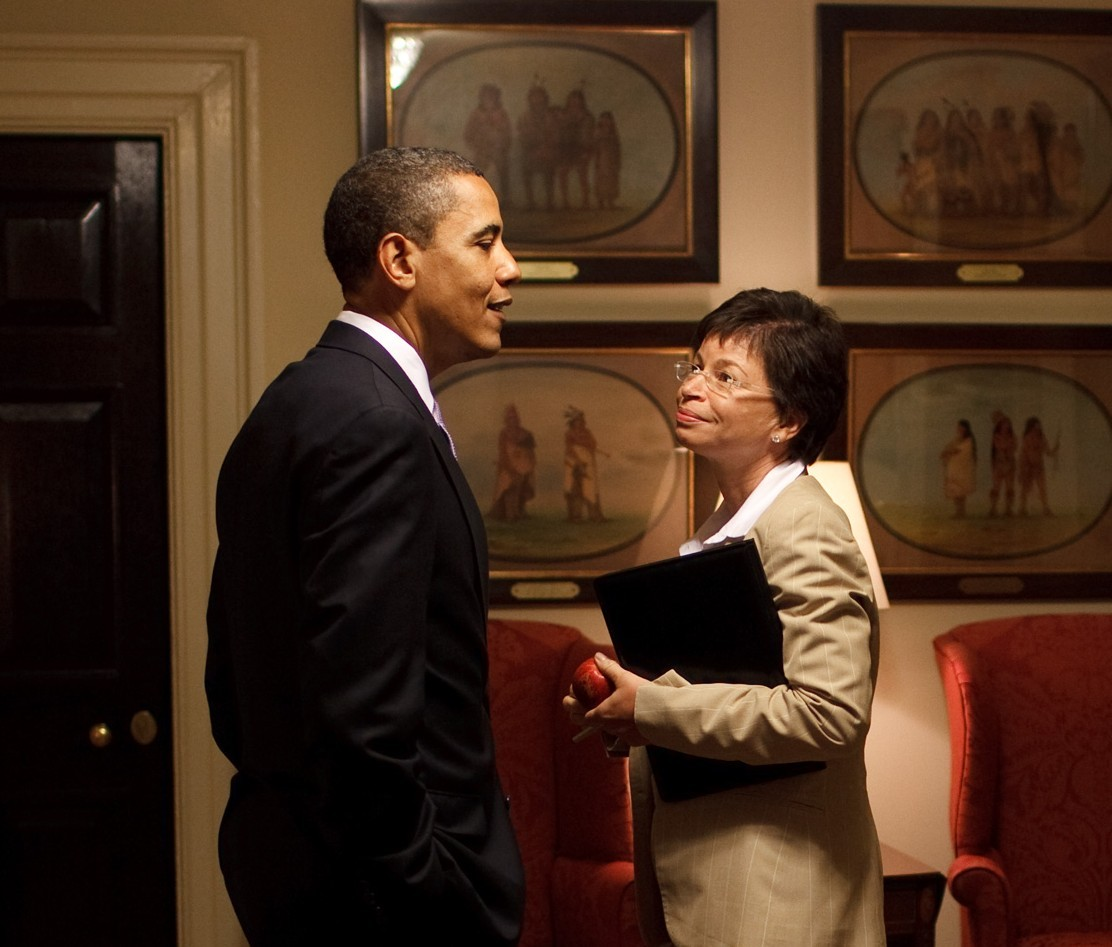
President Obama speaks with Jarrett in a West Wing corridor.

In 1991, as deputy chief of staff to Mayor Richard Daley, Jarrett interviewed Michelle Robinson, the then-fiancé to future President Barack Obama, for an opening in the mayor's office. She immediately offered Robinson the job afterwards. Robinson asked for time to think and also asked Jarrett to meet Obama. Robinson accepted the job with the mayor's office after meeting for dinner. It was at this time that Jarrett reportedly took the couple under her wing and "introduced them to a wealthier and better-connected Chicago than their own." When Jarrett later left her position at the mayor's office to head the Chicago department of planning and development, Michelle Obama went with her.

=== Support for 2008 US presidential election ===
Obama's election team and supporters, for example at the Philadelphia National Constitution Center speech, included Jarrett, David Plouffe and David Axelrod, all whom later joined him and First Lady Michelle Obama in the White House.

=== Post-Obama administration ===
Since leaving the White House, Jarrett has volunteered as a senior advisor to the Obama Foundation.

She joined the board of directors of Ariel Investments, 2U, Inc., Lyft, Kennedy Center for the Performing Arts, Walgreens Boots Alliance, Ralph Lauren Corporation, Sweetgreen, and is a member of the Goldman Sachs One Million Black Women advisory council.

She was the co-chair of the United State of Women, chair of the Board of When We All Vote and Civic Nation, and a senior advisor to ATTN:. In January 2018 she became a distinguished senior fellow at the University of Chicago Law School.

In July 2017 Jarrett signed a deal with Viking Press for her book titled Finding My Voice: My Journey to the West Wing and the Path Forward. It was published in 2019.

In December 2020, following the announcement that Obama Foundation President Wally Adeyemo would be nominated to become Deputy Secretary of the Treasury, the Foundation announced that Jarrett would take over his duties on an interim basis until a successor can be found. Jarrett has been chief executive officer of the Foundation since 2021 and is a member of the board of directors.

== Awards and honors ==
She was named by the governor of Illinois as a 2026 recipient of the Order of Lincoln, an award which recognizes "remarkable contributions to the betterment of humanity in or on behalf of the State of Illinois."

== In popular culture ==
Along with Donna Brazile, vice chairwoman of the Democratic National Committee, she is one of the political figures to make a cameo appearance as herself in the CBS drama The Good Wife.

In 2018, a tweet by Roseanne Barr disparaged her. Barr said, in reference to Jarrett, it was as though the "Muslim Brotherhood and Planet of the Apes had a baby". Subsequently, Barr was sanctioned by her talent agency ICM Partners, losing the lead role on her eponymous television program, Roseanne.

== Personal life ==
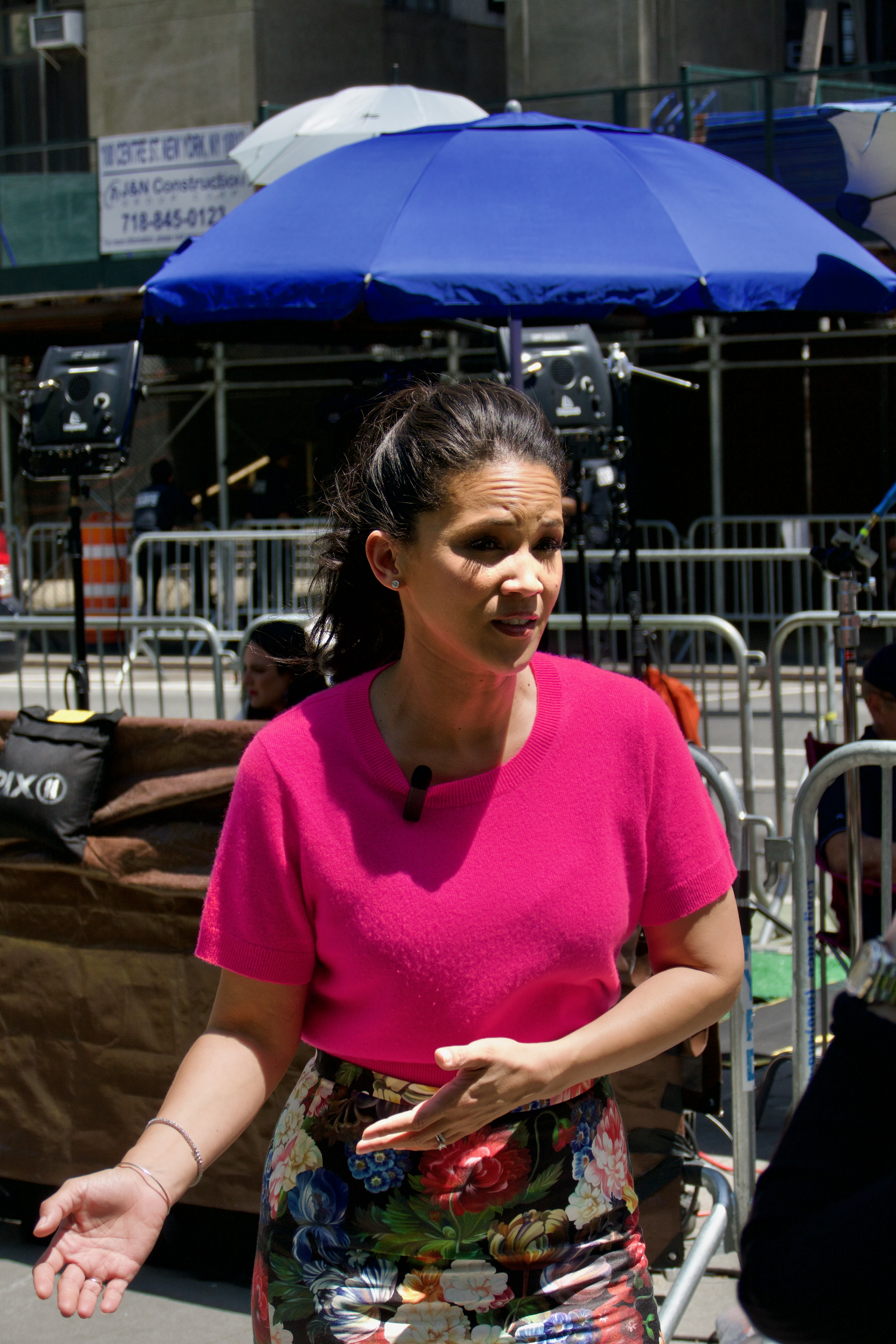
Jarrett's daughter, Laura Jarrett

In 1983, Valerie married William Robert Jarrett, son of Chicago Sun-Times reporter Vernon Jarrett. She attributes her switch from a private to a public career in the 1980s to the birth of their daughter, and her own desire to do something that would make their daughter proud. Her daughter, Laura Jarrett, would go on to become an attorney and reporter for CNN, and become a senior legal correspondent for NBC News and co-anchor of the Saturday edition of Today, and daughter-in-law of the Canadian politician Bas Balkissoon. Valerie Jarrett separated from her husband in 1987 and they were divorced in 1988.

Political offices
Preceded by Julie Cram as Director of the Office of Public Liaison	Director of the Office of Public Engagement and Intergovernmental Affairs; 2009–2017; Served alongside: Tina Tchen, Jon Carson, Paulette Aniskoff (Public Engagement); Cecilia Muñoz, David Agnew, Jerry Abramson (Intergovernmental Affairs)	Succeeded by George Sifakis as Director of the Office of Public Liaison
Preceded by Janet Creighton as Director of the Office of Intergovernmental Affairs	Director of the Office of Public Engagement and Intergovernmental Affairs; 2009–2017; Served alongside: Tina Tchen, Jon Carson, Paulette Aniskoff (Public Engagement); Cecilia Muñoz, David Agnew, Jerry Abramson (Intergovernmental Affairs)	Succeeded by Justin R. Clark as Director of the Office of Intergovernmental Affairs
Preceded by Barry Jackson	Senior Advisor to the President; 2009–2017; Served alongside: Brian Deese, Shailagh Murray	Succeeded by Jared Kushner; Stephen Miller
