= Samuel J. Meisels =

American academic (born 1945)

- Born: September 14, 1945 (age 80); Cleveland, Ohio
- Education: Harvard University, Ed.D. (1973) Harvard University, Ed.M. (1969) University of Rochester, A.B (1967)
- Website: buffettinstitute.nebraska.edu

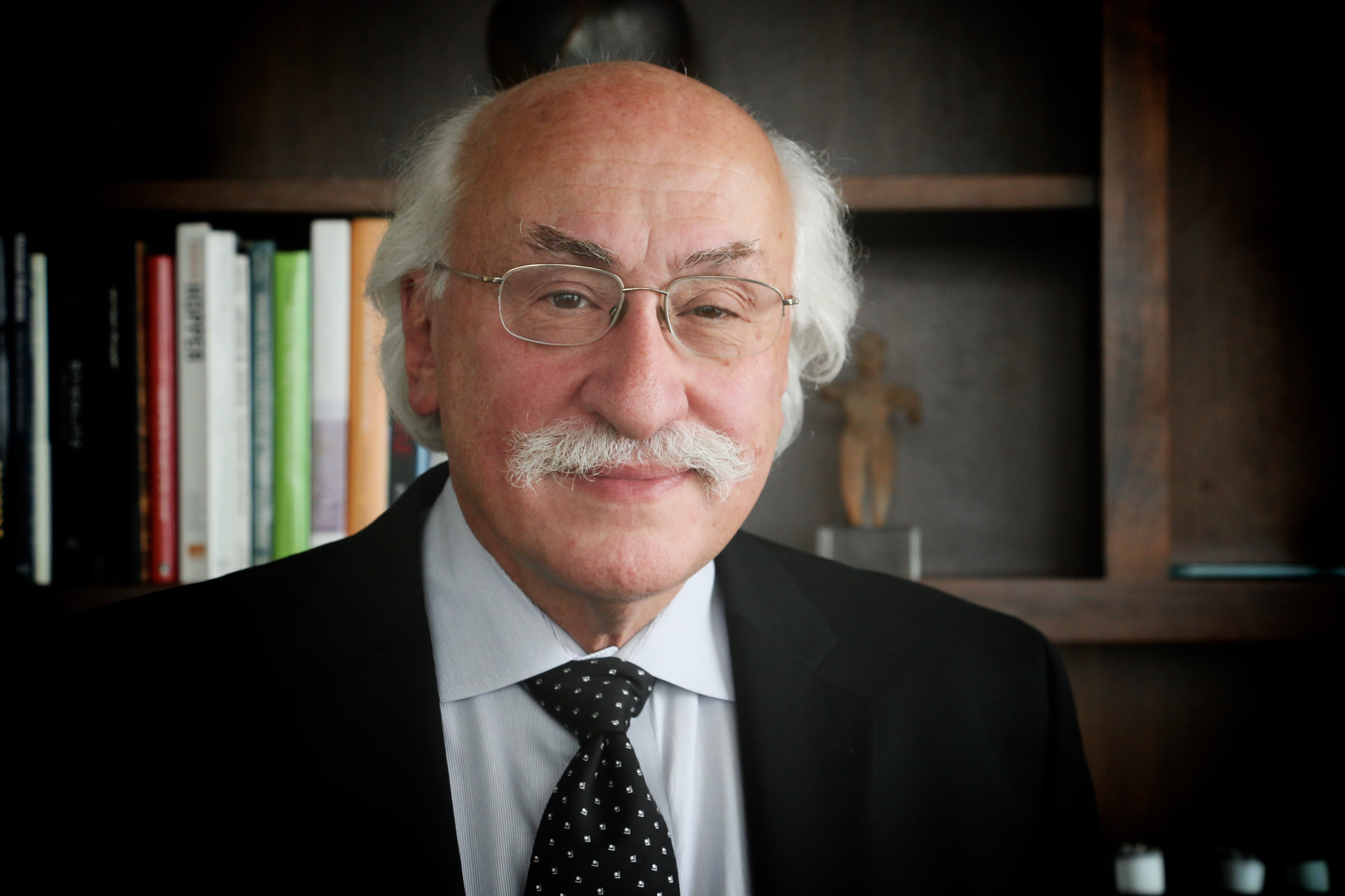

Samuel J. Meisels is an American academic whose scholarship focuses on early childhood assessment, child development, and educational practices that support the developmental needs of young children.

Meisels is the founding executive director of the Buffett Early Childhood Institute at the University of Nebraska–Lincoln, president emeritus of Erikson Institute, and a professor and research scientist emeritus at the University of Michigan. Meisels retired from the Buffett Institute on Feb. 28, 2023, concluding a career that spanned more than a half-century and established him as a leading voice in the field of early childhood education and development.

== Reputation ==
Meisels's reputation stems from his scholarship, impact on early assessment, and application of research on behalf of the lives of children and families. Recognition of his contributions to the field are extensive. In 2010 Meisels received an honorary degree of Doctor of Humane Letters from Roosevelt University and in 2019 the Simms/Mann Institute awarded Meisels its Visionary Leadership Award in Development and Education. Other notable awards include the Richmond-Coleman Award in Developmental Pediatrics, American Academy of Pediatrics (2005); president, Board of Directors, Zero to Three (2006); member, National Academy of Sciences Committee on Early Childhood Pedagogy (2000); Ferguson Award for Leadership in Early Childhood Education, National-Louis University (2000); and Mary E. Switzer Distinguished Fellow in Handicapped Research, US Department of Education (1985).

== Education ==
Meisels received his bachelor's degree with high honors in philosophy from the University of Rochester in 1967 and then enrolled in a master's and doctoral program at Harvard University in education and philosophy. While at Harvard, Meisels began studying the work of Jean Piaget, whose ideas about children and epistemology motivated him to become a teacher of preschool, kindergarten, and first grade. Meisels completed his doctoral studies at the Harvard Graduate School of Education in 1973.

== Professional Positions ==
=== Tufts University ===
In 1972 Meisels accepted a position as a faculty member at Tufts University and, from 1973-1978, was director of the Eliot-Pearson Children's School, the laboratory school of the Department of Child Study. From 1979-1980 he served as Senior Advisor in Early Childhood Development in the Developmental Evaluation Clinic of Children's Hospital Medical Center at Boston before joining the faculty of the University of Michigan.

=== University of Michigan ===
Meisels was a member of the faculty of the University of Michigan from 1980-2001. During his 21 years at Michigan, his research became prominent in the fields of child development, policy, long-term consequences of high-risk birth, and early childhood assessment. At Michigan, he held several positions including that of research scientist and acting director at the Center for Human Growth and Development, and professor, interim dean, and associate dean of research in the School of Education.

=== Erikson Institute ===
Meisels served as president of Erikson Institute, a graduate school in child development, from 2002-2013. Under his leadership, Erikson expanded its research, community partnerships, and graduate programs to meet the needs of the early childhood field. He increased funding for applied research and community-based projects, creating new partnerships with public school teachers, administrators, and students through the New Schools Project, Early Math Collaborative, and Herr Research Center for Children and Social Policy; establishing a comprehensive clinical assessment and counseling center for at-risk children and families; and completing a successful five-year fundraising campaign to build a new campus and support an endowed chair, fellowships, and special programs.

=== Buffett Early Childhood Institute ===
In June 2013 Meisels was appointed founding executive director of the Buffett Early Childhood Institute where he was also a tenured professor of child, youth, and family studies at the University of Nebraska–Lincoln. He held courtesy appointments on the other Nebraska campuses as professor of public health, public administration, and education.

Under Meisels's leadership the Institute developed programs to close the achievement and opportunity gap for vulnerable young children and to elevate the early childhood workforce to enhance its ability to care for young children from birth through Grade 3. These initiatives incorporated multiple systems of training, public policy, research, and evaluation. In 2017 the university appointed Meisels to the Richard D. Holland Presidential Chair in Early Childhood Development, the highest honor the university can confer on a faculty member. At his retirement in 2023 the university appointed him Founding Director Emeritus and Richard D. Holland Presidential Chair Emeritus in Early Childhood Development.

== Contributions to Research and Assessment ==
Meisels’s earliest work demonstrated his interest in theory-based instructional approaches in early childhood classrooms. Over his career he published more than 200 books, articles, assessments, and monographs.

Meisels's work is focused on developmental screening, inclusion of young children with special needs in regular educational programs, developmental consequences of high risk birth, school readiness, and performance assessment of young children. His publications are widely referenced. Google Scholar records more than 11,000 citations of his research. In addition to developing and researching early childhood assessments, he prepared activity books for parents and co-edited two handbooks for the field. He has served on numerous editorial boards as a reviewer and editor.

Meisels’s work is committed to fairness, accuracy, utility, and developmental principles in assessment of children. He has written extensively about the use of alternative assessment strategies that are authentic, performance-based, and developmentally appropriate for young children and those in the early elementary grades, and he co-authored three widely-used early childhood assessments.

=== The Early Screening Inventory ===
In 1975 Meisels and his colleagues began work on a brief developmental screening instrument designed to identify children, aged 3–6, who were at risk for learning and behavior problems. Known as the Early Screening Inventory (ESI-3), this well-researched, nationally validated screening instrument identifies children who can benefit from early intervention services. It is one of the most reliable and carefully developed early childhood screening instruments available and is currently in its third edition.

=== The Work Sampling System ===
First begun in 1987, Work Sampling is an observational assessment for children from preschool (age 3) – Grade 3. WSS is constructivist in orientation, providing teachers with a unique perspective on children's learning and development that differs sharply from conventional outcomes available from standardized achievement tests. The developmental observations recorded with WSS enable teachers and caregivers to document what children are learning in relation to standards of progress that demonstrate children's specific strengths and areas in need of development.

WSS has been used throughout the United States and internationally for more than three decades. Currently in its fifth edition, it has undergone extensive validation, and was the subject of several peer-reviewed empirical studies that document its validity.

=== The Ounce Scale ===
Meisels and colleagues also published the Ounce Scale: An Observational Assessment for Infants, Toddlers, and Families. The Ounce is an authentic performance assessment used with children from infancy through age three. Notable is the Ounce Scale's focus on the social and emotional development of infants and toddlers and the involvement of families in the assessment process.

== Impact ==
As researcher, practitioner, policy analyst, and administrator, Meisels has helped shape the United States's view of young children as well as young children's care and education. His research and development altered the experience of countless children and teachers; influenced local, state, and national policymakers' decisions; and contributed to changes in legislation, including Congressional suspension of a nationwide test for all 4-5 year-olds in Head Start (the National Reporting System).

Meisels's policy analysis of Massachusetts's early intervention services shaped its system of care in its early days. His work with disabled children advanced the national discussion on inclusion. His screening and assessment tools encouraged the use of child-centered, non-discriminatory assessment. His 200+ publications are models of applied research. And his leadership of Erikson and the Buffett Institute dramatically expanded the reach of his ideas and his passion to help all children achieve their full potential.
