= Irving Harris =

American businessman and philanthropist

- Born: August 4, 1910; Saint Paul, Minnesota
- Died: September 25, 2004 (aged 94)
- Occupations: Businessman and philanthropist
- Years active: 1930–2000
- Children: 3

Irving Brooks Harris (August 4, 1910 – September 25, 2004) was an American businessman and philanthropist.

== Early life and career ==
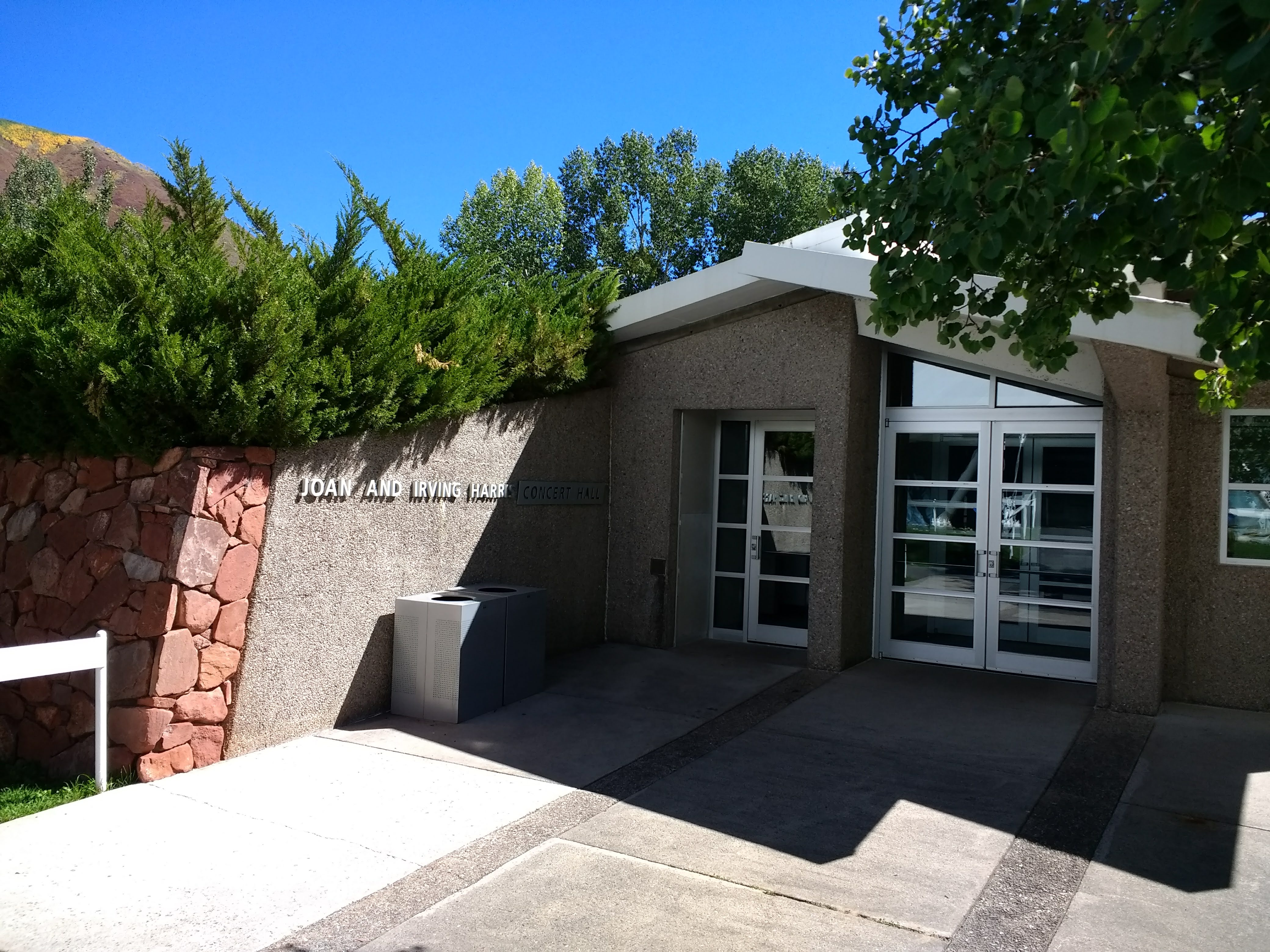
The entrance to the Joan and Irving Harris Concert Hall in Aspen, Colorado.

Harris was one of three children born and raised in Saint Paul, Minnesota. His father, Bill Harris, was a wealthy woolen merchant. He attended Yale University and graduated Phi Beta Kappa in 1931. He was of Jewish descent.

He went to work for the Toni Home Permanent Company, a hair care company co-founded by his brother Neison Harris (with Ray Lee) in 1944 which introduced the first home permanent. Toni Home was sold to the Gillette Safety Razor Co. in 1948 for nearly $20.0 million. The original Toni manufacturing facility was located in a former schoolhouse near Forest Lake, Minnesota.

In 1948, he moved to Chicago, where he served as chairman of fire and burglar alarm manufacturer Pittway, which was later acquired by Honeywell International, and then as the chairman of the mutual fund, Liberty Acorn, an affiliate of Liberty Mutual. In 1957, he became a partner of R.J. Levy and Company, a New York Stock Exchange firm headquartered in New York. In 1975, he left Levy to focus on managing his family’s assets. In 1986, he renamed the family investment firm, William Harris Investors, Inc., in honor of his father.

== Philanthropy and activism ==
Harris did much of his charitable work in Chicago, Illinois, but he also donated substantially to the arts in Aspen, Colorado. Harris contributed most of his money to programs for children and the arts such as the Joan W. and Irving B. Harris Theater for Music and Dance at Millennium Park. In 1986, Harris gave a donation that established The Irving B. Harris Graduate School of Public Policy Studies at The University of Chicago.

Harris gave the lead gift in 1954 to create public television station WTTW in Chicago - he later served as the station's Chairman of the Board.

His philanthropy created several non-profits in Chicago: Family Focus (with Bernice Weissbourd); the Ounce of Prevention Fund, a public-private partnership dedicated to preventing teenage pregnancy, child abuse and neglect; and the Erikson Institute, a graduate school founded in 1966 involved child development. Harris was also an ardent supporter and donor of Zero to Three, an early childhood organization.

Harris was a benefactor to Jewish causes. He was a member of the American Jewish Committee's National Leadership Council, President's Cabinet and was a Founder of the AJC's Institute on American Jewish-Israeli Relations. He served on the Advisory Council of the AJC Chicago Chapter for 35 years. He was awarded the AJC's Human Rights Medallion for his efforts to combat anti-Semitism.

Harris published a book, Children in Jeopardy, in 1996.

== Personal life ==
Harris married twice. His first wife was Rosetta Wolpert (b. 1910 Minneapolis, MN); they had two daughters, Roxanne Harris Meyer Frank and Virginia Harris Polsky, and a son, William Wolpert Harris. His second wife was Joan Harris. Harris is the grandfather of noted New York City restaurateur Danny Meyer, son of Roxanne Harris Meyer Frank.

== See also ==
- Harris School of Public Policy
- Pritzker family
- James Crown
- David G. Booth
