= Eva Rosenfeld =

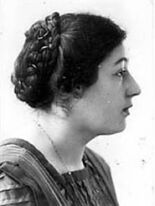
Eva Rosenfeld.

Eva Marie Rosenfeld (5 January 1892 – 17 August 1977) was a Jewish-German-British psychoanalyst, an analysand of Sigmund Freud and Melanie Klein.

Although born in New York City, Eva Rosenfeld spent her youth in Berlin where her father Theodor Rosenfeld was a theater producer, one of the members of the Freie Bühne theatre. When Eva was 15 years old, her father died and she left school to begin her career as a social worker. In 1911 she married her cousin, the lawyer Valentin Rosenfeld (1886–1970). Valentin studied in Vienna and attended the lectures held by Freud. Through her husband, Eva first became aware of psychoanalysis. When they married, they settled in Vienna.

Eva and Valentin Rosenfeld had four children, but three of them died in young age. The loss of children—especially the 15-year-old daughter Rosemarie in 1927—shadowed the later life of Eva Rosenfeld.

After World War I Rosenfeld opened a school for girls. Eva Rosenfeld and Anna Freud became close friends sometime in 1924 through Siegfried Bernfeld. In 1927 Rosenfeld and Anna Freud founded (together with Dorothy Burlingham) a school in Vienna where most of the students underwent psychoanalysis, usually with Anna Freud.

Eva Rosenfeld was a patient of Sigmund Freud from 1929 until 1931. After her divorce she returned to Berlin in 1931 and assisted Ernst Simmel at a psychoanalytical sanatorium. Her formal education as a psychoanalyst was completed in Berlin. In 1936 she moved to England, where she worked the rest of her life as a psychotherapist and supervising analyst; her analysands include Benjamin B. Rubinstein, Nina Coltart and Maria W. Piers. She was further analyzed by Melanie Klein in 1938–1941 and this damaged her relations with the Freud family.

== Writings ==
- The Pan-headed Moses: A parallel. Lecture, British Psycho-Analytical Society. 1950.
- Dream and vision: Some remarks on Freud's Egyptian bird dream. IJP 37, 1956, 97–105.
- Obituary: Hedwig Hoffer 1888–1961. IJP 1962, 477.
- Recollected in Tranquillity. (Unpublished memoirs.)

== Literature ==
- Appignanesi, Lisa & Forrester, John: Freud’s Women. Phoenix, London. 2005. ISBN 0-75381-916-3
- Freud, Anna: Briefe an Eva Rosenfeld. (Herausgegeben von Peter Heller.) Stroemfeld, Basel. 1994. ISBN 3-86109-118-6
- Grosskurth, Phyllis: Melanie Klein: Ihre Welt und ihr Werk (1987). Stuttgart 1993.
- Mijolla, Alain de: Rosenfeld, Eva Marie. – Dictionnaire internationale de la psychanalyse, p. 1581. (2002). Paris 2005.
- Ross, Victor: Eva Marie Rosenfeld (1892–1977): Persönliche Erinnerung an eine mutige Frau. – Anna Freud: Briefe an Eva Rosenfeld, pp. 33–58. Herausgegeben von Peter Heller. Basel 1994.
