= Benjamin B. Rubinstein =

Finnish psychoanalyst (1905–1989)

Benjamin Björn Rubinstein
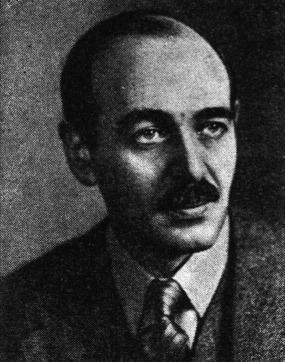
- Rubinstein c. 1939
- Born: April 12, 1905; Helsinki, Grand Duchy of Finland
- Died: July 12, 1989 (aged 84); New York City, U.S.
- Education: University of Helsinki
- Known for: work on philosophy of psychoanalysis
- Scientific career
- Fields: Psychiatry, psychoanalysis

Benjamin Björn Rubinstein (April 12, 1905 – July 12, 1989) was a Finnish Jewish–American physician and psychoanalyst.

== Career ==
Benjamin B. Rubinstein was born in the Jewish community of Helsinki, Finland, and he attended school both in his home town and in Copenhagen. His native language was Swedish. In Helsinki University, he studied first history and philosophy, but after having read Totem and Taboo by Sigmund Freud, he changed to the Faculty of Medicine in order to become a psychoanalyst. He also worked as a research assistant to Ragnar Granit.

Rubinstein attained the degree of Licentiate in Medicine in 1936, and studied neurology and psychiatry in the United Kingdom in 1937–1939. His supervising analyst was Eva Rosenfeld, a student of Freud.

When the Winter War broke out in 1939, Rubinstein returned to Finland and served as a medic and a psychiatrist in the army. He married his cousin Dinorah Rosenthal in 1940.

In 1947, Rubinstein and his wife moved to the United States to be educated at the Menninger Foundation in Topeka, Kansas, until 1953. Then he opened a private analytical practice in New York. Rubinstein and his wife become naturalized U.S. citizens in 1957.

Benjamin B. Rubinstein wrote extensively on the philosophy of psychoanalysis, including articles on the mind–body dichotomy, motivation, metaphor, the logic of psychoanalytic explanations, and metapsychology. His collected papers were published in 1997: Psychoanalysis and the Philosophy of Science: Collected Papers of Benjamin B. Rubinstein, M.D.

== Sources ==
=== Literature ===
- Holt, Robert R. 1997: Editor's Introduction: The Life and Work of Benjamin Bjorn Rubinstein. — Psychoanalysis and the Philosophy of Science: Collected Papers of Benjamin B. Rubinstein, M.D. (edited by Robert R. Holt), pp. 1–21. International Universities Press, Madison. ISBN 0-8236-5245-9
- Ihanus, Juhani 2018: Benjamin B. Rubinstein — A Finnish-American Psychoanalyst. Clio’s Psyche, 24 (2): pp. 162–166. ISSN 1080-2622
- Ihanus, Juhani & Talvitie, Vesa 2007: Benjamin Rubinstein — psykoanalyysin tuntematon suuri suomalainen. — Psykoterapia 4, pp. 226–242. (On-line version.) (in Finnish)
