= Barbara T. Bowman =

American childhood education expert (1928–2024)

- Born: Barbara Francis Taylor; October 30, 1928; Chicago, Illinois, U.S.
- Died: November 4, 2024 (aged 96); Chicago, Illinois, U.S.
- Education: Sarah Lawrence College (BA); University of Chicago (MA)
- Occupation: Early childhood education advocate
- Known for: Co-founder of Erikson Institute
- Board member of: Business People in the Public Interest, Chicago Public Library Foundation, Great Books Foundation, High Scope Educational Foundation, Institute for Psychoanalysis, National Board for Professional Teaching Standards
- Spouse: James E. Bowman (m. 1950; died 2011)
- Children: Valerie Jarrett
- Father: Robert Rochon Taylor
- Relatives: Laura Jarrett (granddaughter); Robert Robinson Taylor (grandfather)

Barbara Francis Taylor Bowman (October 30, 1928 – November 4, 2024) was an American early childhood education expert, advocate, academic, and author. Her areas of expertise included early childhood care/education, educational equity for minority and low-income children, as well as intergenerational family support and roles. She served on several boards and was the co-founder of Erikson Institute, where she pioneered the teaching of early childhood education and administration.

== Early life and education ==
Barbara Francis Taylor was born on October 30, 1928, in Chicago, the daughter of Laura Dorothy Vaughn (née Jennings) and Robert Rochon Taylor, who was on the board of the Chicago Housing Authority. Her grandfather was architect Robert Robinson Taylor. Her biological mother was half African-American. After receiving a B.A. degree from Sarah Lawrence College, she began teaching at the University of Chicago Laboratory Schools' nursery school, while simultaneously earning her M.A. degree in education from the University of Chicago in 1952. In 1950, she married James E. Bowman. They lived in Iran in the mid-1950s, where James Bowman established a hospital in Shiraz.

== Career ==
Lyndon Johnson's War on Poverty and the 1965 creation of Head Start inspired Bowman. The next year, with the support of businessman and philanthropist Irving B. Harris, Bowman cofounded the Chicago School for Early Childhood Education (now known as the Erikson Institute) with child psychologist Maria Piers and social worker Lorraine Wallach. Bowman went on to serve as its president during the period of 1994 to 2001, and maintained a professorship at the institute, where she was the Irving B. Harris Professor of Child Development. The institute's Barbara T. Bowman Professor of Child Development professorship is named in her honor.

Bowman was the Chicago Public Schools' Chief Early Childhood Education Officer. She was the past president (1980–1982) of the National Association for the Education of Young Children. Her Board memberships are many including: Business People in the Public Interest, Chicago Public Library Foundation, Great Books Foundation, High Scope Educational Foundation, Institute for Psychoanalysis, and National Board for Professional Teaching Standards. Among the many honorary degrees awarded to Bowman are those from Bank Street College, Dominican University, Governors State University, Roosevelt University, and Wheelock College. During her career, she has also served on the editorial board of Early Childhood Research Quarterly, and chaired the National Academy of Sciences, National Research Council's Committee on Early Childhood Pedagogy.

== Personal life and death ==
Bowman was married to the late James E. Bowman (died 2011), renowned pathologist and geneticist of African American descent, and the first Black resident at St. Luke's Hospital. They had one daughter, Valerie Jarrett, who was Senior Advisor and Assistant to the President for Intergovernmental Affairs and Public Liaison in the Obama administration. Their granddaughter, Laura Jarrett, graduated from Harvard Law School in 2010 and married Tony Balkissoon, who is also a lawyer and the son of Ontario MP Bas Balkissoon, in June 2012.

Bowman died from heart failure at a Chicago hospital on November 4, 2024, at the age of 96.

== Awards ==
- Chicago Association for the Education of Young Children Outstanding Service to Children Award
- Chicago League of Women Voters' Civic Contribution Award
- Harold W. McGraw Jr. Prize in Education, 2005
- Mercedes Award
- National Black Child Development Institute Leadership Award
- Voices for Illinois' Children Start Early Award
- Chicago Institute for Psychoanalysis Human Spirit Award

== Selected works ==
=== Books ===
- -, & Attinasi, J. (1994). Cultural diversity and academic achievement Urban education program. (Oak Brook, IL]): NCREL. OCLC 34512344
- -, Bredekamp, S., Dodge, D. T., Epstein, A. S., & Borgia, E. (2000). Ensuring Quality and Accountability Through Leadership Tape 1, Curriculum and Assessment. Washington, D.C.: Head Start Bureau, The National Head Start Child Development Institute. OCLC 174103343
- -, Donovan, S., & Burns, M. S. (2001). Eager to learn: Educating our preschoolers. Washington, DC: National Academy Press. ISBN 0-309-06836-3
- – (2002). Love to read: Essays in developing and enhancing early literacy skills of African American children. [Washington, D.C.]: National Black Child Development Institute. OCLC 52332653
- -, & Moore, E. K. (2006). School readiness and social-emotional development: Perspectives on cultural diversity. Washington, DC: National Black Child Development Institute. OCLC 123438767
