= Henry Taylor (carpenter) =

American carpenter (1823–1891)

Henry Taylor (c. 1823–1891) born enslaved in the United States. He was a carpenter and citizen in Wilmington, North Carolina during the mid and late 19th century. He was born in Cumberland County near Fayetteville, the son of his white owner, Angus Taylor, and an enslaved woman Maisley who belonged to Angus as well. It is thought that Angus possibly had Henry trained as a carpenter to make sure that he would be able to support himself. Henry later moved to Wilmington where he became a carpenter-builder, and established a mercantile business along with a white ship owner.

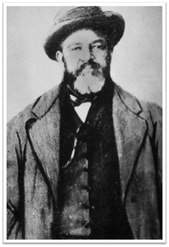
Portrait of Henry Taylor

He was described by Booker T. Washington in The Story of the Negro as "the son of a white man who was at the same time his master. Although he was nominally enslaved, he was early given liberty to do about as he pleased." Taylor was a successful carpenter–builder and businessman before the Civil War as well as after. He ran a grocery store following emancipation along with continuing with carpentry. Some projects of his included the Hemenway School (Note: Hemenway School) and the first black Masonic lodge in Wilmington, Giblem Masonic Lodge. He was also a founding member of the Chestnut Street Presbyterian Church (Note: Chestnut Street Presbyterian Church) and was also active in local politics including the Executive Board of the Colored Union League.

Henry Taylor helped with creating many projects, but he is most known for his construction on the Bellamy project. He helped construct the Bellamy Mansion from 1859 to 1861. The Bellamy Mansion, well known to be built by black artisans, was carefully designed by James F. Post and his assistant Rufus Bunnell. Taylor's part in constructing it was very respected through his family, and was carried down through memories. In 1999, his granddaughter, Gladys Whiteman Baskerville, along with her extended family, held her 100th birthday celebration at the Bellamy Mansion.

Taylor married Emily Still, a native of Fayetteville, and the couple had four children whom they raised in Wilmington. It has also been noted that Taylor built his family's home, The Henry and Emily Taylor House, (Note: The Henry and Emily Taylor House) at 112 North 8th Street. Their four children were John Edward, Anna Maria (Shober), Sarah Louise (Whiteman), and Robert Robinson. Their son Robert is well known as the first black graduate of the Massachusetts Institute of Technology, as well as the first accredited black architect in the United States. The other siblings were also successful; John Edward Taylor became a successful businessman and was also the first black man appointed to Deputy Collector of Customs in Wilmington, Anna Maria and Sarah Louise Taylor were Howard University graduates. Taylor died in 1891.

Taylor's great-great-granddaughter, Valerie Jarrett, was senior advisor to the 44th president of the United States, Barack Obama.
