= Healthy Families Parenting Inventory =

Instrument to assess the likelihood of child maltreatment

The Healthy Families Parenting Inventory (HFPI) is an assessment instrument used by early childhood educators and home visitors in the United States and internationally (See, e.g. Turkey) to measure change in nine parenting domains. The HFPI has been used extensively with the home visitation model to assess parent-focused outcomes in federal- and state-supported home visitation programs, and is used to assess the likelihood of child maltreatment.

== History ==
In 1990, a report by the U.S. Advisory Board on Child Abuse and Neglect drew attention to the problem of child abuse in the country. After the report, home visitation programs in the U. S. started to be developed by several organizations, such as Healthy Families America, Parents as Teachers, and Nurse-Family Partnership. In 2010, a national inventory recorded 119 home visitation models in 46 states. The Healthy Families Parenting Inventory (HFPI) was developed in 2004 to promote evaluation of such parenting programs and to respond to the need for an outcome instrument sensitive to change. The HFPI was initially developed for the evaluation of accredited Healthy Families America Programs. In 2017, the HFPI was translated and adopted by state services in Turkey.

== Implementation ==
The HFPI is used by home visitors to develop focused interventions and to address family strengths and critical needs. The HFPI was developed specifically for use in evaluating home visitation programs for populations of at-risk children from birth to five years of age. The HFPI may be used starting at the birth of a child and every six months afterward. The 63-item instrument measures aspects of behavior, attitudes, and perceptions related to parenting. The 63 items are divided into nine parenting domains. Five subscales (Problem Solving, Depression, Personal Care, Role Satisfaction, and Parenting Efficacy) examine the role of the parent. Two subscales (Home Environment and Parent/Child Interaction) target the family level. The Social Support subscale examines the community level. The Mobilizing Resources subscale deals with the community level and the broader societal level. The items for the HFPI are written as declarative statements (i. e. "I feel supported by others" / "I have organized my home for raising a child" / "I feel I'm doing an excellent job as a parent"). The time length for the completion of the instrument is approximately 10 minutes.

== Subscales ==
The nine subscales are organized as follows:

=== Social Support ===
The Social Support subscale (items 1–5) measures the connectedness of parents to their friends, family, community, and other support resources.

=== Problem-solving ===
The Problem-solving subscale (items 6–11) measures parents' resilience and ability to deal with problems.

=== Depression ===
The Depression subscale (items 12–20) is designed to identify signs of clinical depression in parents.

=== Personal Care ===
The Personal Care subscale (items 21–25) measures the attention parents pay to their well-being.

=== Mobilizing Resources ===
The Mobilizing Resources subscale (items 26–31) measures the ability of parents to ask for outside help when necessary.

=== Role Satisfaction ===
The Role Satisfaction subscale (items 32–37) measures the level of satisfaction parents have about their role as caregivers.

=== Parent/child Interaction ===
Parent/child Interaction (items 38–47) examines the attachment between the parent and child.

=== Home environment ===
The Home Environment subscale (items 48–57) measures if and how a parent has created a safe, supportive and responsive home environment for their child.

=== Parenting Efficacy ===
The Parenting Efficacy subscale (items 58–63) measures the prevalence of caregivers' positive attitudes regarding their parenting abilities.

== Scoring ==
The subscales of the HFPI are scored individually by calculating the items within each domain, with scores ranging from a low of 5 to a high of 50. The items are scored using a Likert scale comprising "rarely or never, a little of the time, some of the time, a good part of the time, and always or most of the time." There are an additional seven red flag questions across two subscales designed to indicate the need for special intervention on behalf of the home visitors.
