= Nina Coltart =

British psychoanalyst

Nina Coltart (21 November 1927 – 24 June 1997) was a British psychoanalyst, psychotherapist, and essayist.

== Family ==
She was born in Shortlands, Kent, England. Her father was a medical doctor and her mother, a housewife. In 1940 she and her younger sister Gill were evacuated to Cornwall, where they lived with their maternal grandmother and a nanny who, years before, had cared for Coltart's mother. Coltart's parents died in a train wreck under blackout conditions that year on their way to visit their daughters.

== Education ==
Coltart attended Sherborne School for Girls and from there went to Somerville College, Oxford, where she read English and Modern Languages. She applied to St. Bartholomew's Hospital's Medical College, where she was the first female editor of the Barts Journal. She earned a medical degree there and began work as a psychiatrist.

== Psychoanalysis ==
Soon after Coltart began training in psychoanalysis. In her training analysis she was analyzed by Eva Rosenfeld. Coltart began her private practice in London in 1961. In 1964 Coltart qualified as an Associate Member of the British Psychoanalytical Society. She became a Full Member in 1969, and a training analyst in 1971. Much later, she would write, "Ever since childhood, I could think of nothing that gave me more intense enjoyment than listening to people telling me their stories. To that end she consulted with patients for referral, assessing more than 3,000 patients in her career.

Coltart was known as an enthusiastic, warm, and encouraging mentor. Christopher Bollas called her "one of the great training analysts." She took on especially difficult patients and wrote "in language devoid of jargon, dogma, or pretentiousness" about her cases. She used concepts and thinkers from philosophy and literature to illuminate her writing and thought. Love, religion, grief, the psychoanalytic relationship, morality, culture, the silent patient, and the body—including that of the therapist, who sits all day — are some of the many areas she explored. She lectured widely, traveling to the U.S., Australia, New Zealand, Sweden, and Israel.

Coltart was a neo-Freudian and a Buddhist and theorized that there are distinct similarities in the transformation of the self that occurs in both psychoanalysis and Buddhism.

Coltart was Director of the London Clinic of Psychoanalysis for ten years and Vice President of the British Psychoanalytical Society.

== Euthanasia ==
She retired in 1994 to her house in the country in Leighton Buzzard, Bedfordshire. Due to long hours of sitting for her work, plus years of heavy smoking, she developed a collapsed vertebra, giving her constant, severe pain. Her pain killers then caused a perforated stomach ulcer, seriously worsening her condition. As a Buddhist she was completely calm about her own death and she chose to end her life through voluntary, self-induced euthanasia on 24 June 1997.
