= Zero to Three =

US nonprofit organization

- Founded: 1977
- Type: 501(c)(3) nonprofit corporation
- Location: United States
- Executive Director: Matthew Melmed
- Website: zerotothree.org

Zero to Three National Center for Infants Toddlers and Families, formerly the National Center for Infants, Toddlers, and Families, commonly known as Zero to Three and stylized as ZERO TO THREE, is a US nonprofit organization focused on the healthy development of babies and toddlers from birth to three years old. The organization participates in policy advocacy, provides professional development for early childhood professionals, and operates programs related to children's health and welfare in a number of states. Zero to Three also publishes a variety of resources for parents, professionals and policy makers, most notably the DC:0–5 Diagnostic Classification of Mental Health and Developmental Disorders of Infancy and Early Childhood. The organization's research is widely cited in the field of early childhood development and infant health.

== Programs ==
=== Healthy Steps ===
Zero To Three's Healthy Steps program is an evidence based model that places development experts in pediatric primary care sites in order to provide screening and connect families to social services outside of the typical focus of medical professionals. The program offers practical support designed to address social and psychological needs of infants and their families, like identifying care options for a parent's history of trauma, or connecting families to stable housing and food.

Under the Affordable Care Act, Healthy Steps was initially designated as an evidence based home visiting model by the Department of Health and Human Services. As of 2015, Healthy Steps no longer considers home visits to be its primary mode of delivering services.

=== Safe Babies ===
Inspired by results from Florida's Infant and Young Child Mental Health Pilot Program, Zero To Three developed a framework for improving outcomes for families and children who were subject to the family court system. The result, Zero To Three's Safe Babies Court Team program, has been replicated in jurisdictions across the country. Since its inception implementation of the program has grown rapidly, including at least 65 active sites across 30 states. More than 90% of children in the program are reunited with biological parents or placed permanently with kin, guardianships or adoptive homes within a year.

== Diagnostic Manual ==
In 1987, Zero to Three convened a group of clinicians and researchers in the United States, Canada and Europe to develop a mental health classification system for infants and toddlers. After conducting literature reviews and considering case reports and clinical experiences, the task force members identified diagnostic categories and specific patterns of emotional and behavioral problems. The first edition of the manual, DC:0–3 Diagnostic Classification of Mental Health and Developmental Disorders of Infancy and Early Childhood, was published in 1994; in 2021 it was expanded to include children from ages zero to five.
