= Robert Robinson Taylor =

American architect (1868–1942)

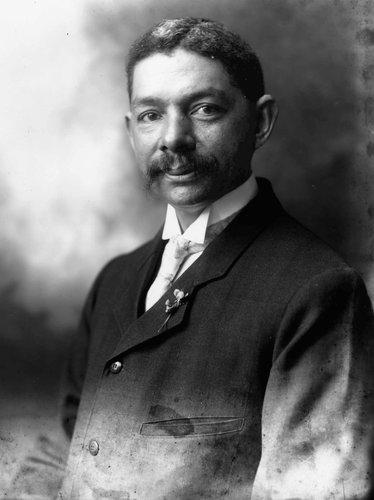
- Born: June 8, 1868; Wilmington, North Carolina, U.S.
- Died: December 13, 1942 (aged 74); Tuskegee, Alabama, U.S.
- Education: Massachusetts Institute of Technology
- Occupation: Architect
- Spouses: Beatrice Rochon Taylor; Nellie Chestnut Taylor
- Children: 5
- Parent(s): Henry Taylor; Emily Still
- Relatives: Robert Rochon Taylor (son); Barbara T. Bowman (granddaughter); Valerie Jarrett (great-granddaughter)

Robert Robinson Taylor (June 8, 1868 – December 13, 1942) was an American architect and educator. Taylor was the first African-American student enrolled at the Massachusetts Institute of Technology (MIT), and the first accredited African-American architect when he graduated in 1892. He was an early and influential member of the Tuskegee Institute faculty.

A native of Wilmington, North Carolina, Taylor remained in architectural practice in the American South for more than forty years. He was part of what was possibly the nation's first black architecture firm, Taylor and Persley, a partnership founded in July 1920 with Louis H. Persley. He designed many of the early buildings of the Tuskegee Institute, and at several other Historically black colleges and universities. As second-in-command to Booker T. Washington, the Tuskegee Institute's founder, Taylor was instrumental in both campus planning and inventing the school's industrial curriculum.

== Early life ==
Robert Robinson Taylor was born on June 8, 1868, in Wilmington, North Carolina. His father, Henry Taylor, worked as a carpenter and businessman, born into slavery but freed in 1847 by his father and owner Angus Taylor. His mother, Emily Still, was the daughter of freedmen even prior to the Civil War. He left home for MIT in 1888, where he studied architecture. In June 1890 and again in September 1891, he was recommended for the Loring Scholarship, which he held for two consecutive academic years: 1890–1891 and 1892–1893.

During his course of study at MIT, he talked in person on more than one occasion with Booker T. Washington. What Washington had in mind was for Taylor to develop the industrial program at Tuskegee and to plan and direct the construction of new buildings for the campus. At the MIT faculty meeting on May 26, 1892, Taylor was one of twelve students in Course IV, the architectural program, recommended for a degree. The class of 1892 was the largest on record since MIT's founding. After graduation, Taylor did not head directly to Tuskegee. He finally accepted the Tuskegee offer in the fall or winter of 1892.

== Career ==
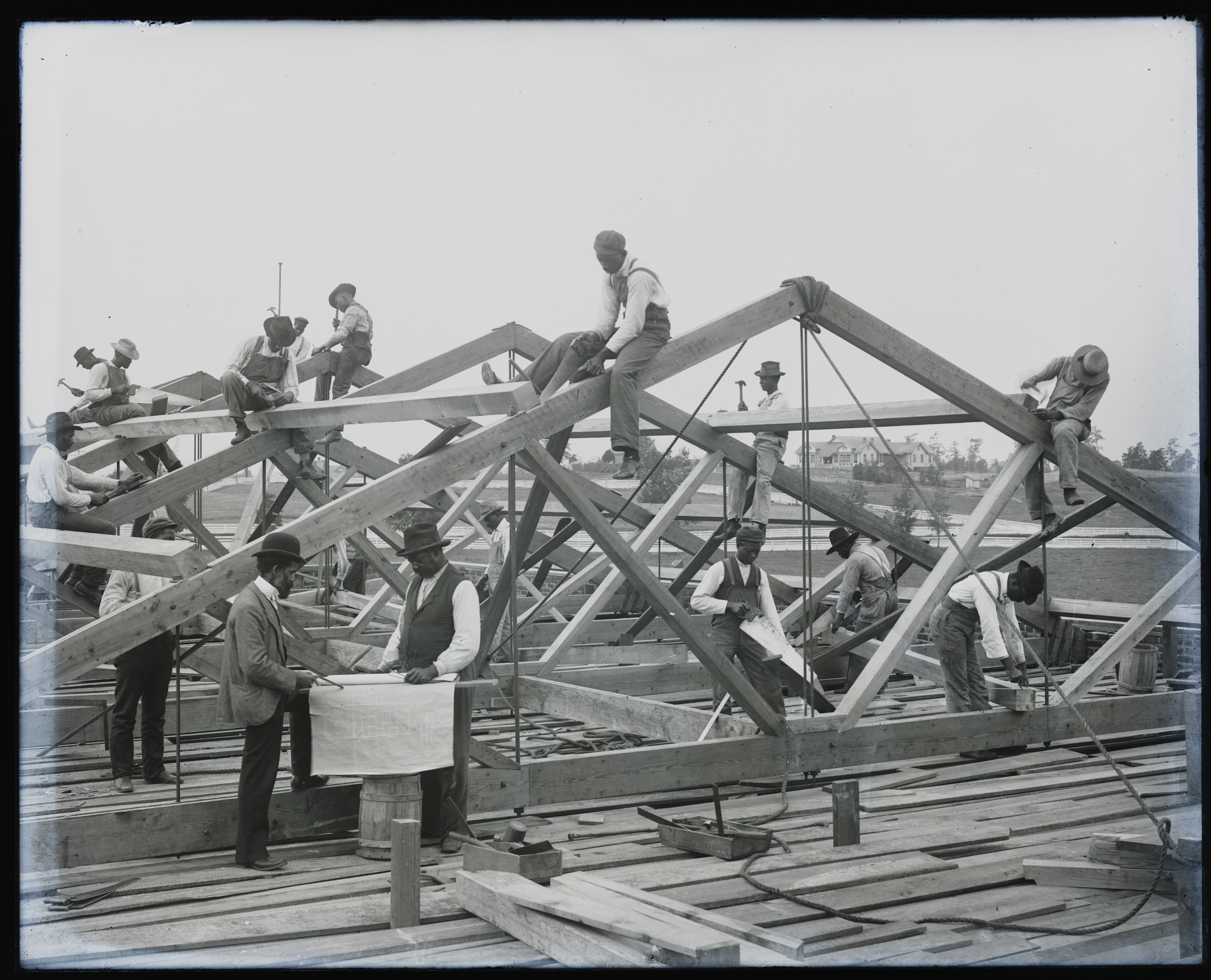
Tuskegee students at work on one of Taylor's buildings (1902)

Taylor's first building project on the Tuskegee University campus was the Science Hall (Thrasher Hall) completed in 1893. The new Science Hall was constructed entirely by students, using bricks made also by students under Taylor's supervision. The project epitomized Washington's philosophy of instilling in Tuskegee students, the descendants of former enslaved Africans, the value and dignity of physical labor. It exemplified the capabilities of African Americans in the building trades, and it underscored the larger potential of the manual training curricula being developed at Tuskegee. A number of other buildings followed, including the original Tuskegee Chapel, erected between 1895 and 1898, and The Oaks, built in 1899 as Tuskegee's presidential residence.

From 1899 to 1902, he returned to Cleveland, Ohio, to work on his own and for the architectural firm of Charles W. Hopkinson. Upon his return to Tuskegee from Cleveland in 1902, he was architect and director of "mechanical industries" until his retirement in the mid-1930s. To develop a sound curriculum at Tuskegee, both Washington and Taylor drew inspiration from MIT as a model. Taylor's own admiration for MIT as a model for Tuskegee's development was conveyed in a speech that he delivered at MIT in 1911. Taylor cited examples to the 1911 US Congress in a paper to illustrate the kinds of rigorous ideas, approaches, and methods that Tuskegee had adopted from MIT and successfully applied within the context of a black educational institution.

Taylor also designed buildings that were not at Tuskegee. These include Carnegie libraries at Wiley College in Marshall, Texas, and at Livingstone College in Salisbury, North Carolina. With his later partner, the black architect Louis H. Persley, he did large buildings at Selma University in Selma, Alabama, and the Colored Masonic Temple, which is also an office building and entertainment venue, in Birmingham, Alabama.

He served for a period as vice-principal of Tuskegee, beginning in 1925. In 1929, under the joint sponsorship of the Phelps-Stokes Fund, the Liberian government, and Firestone Rubber, he went to Kakata, Liberia to lay out architectural plans and devise a program in industrial training for the proposed Booker Washington Institute – "the Tuskegee of Africa." Robert Taylor served on the Mississippi Valley Flood Relief Commission, appointed by President Herbert Hoover, and was chairman of the Tuskegee chapter of the American Red Cross.

Following his retirement in 1933 to his native Wilmington, North Carolina, in 1935, the governor of North Carolina appointed Taylor to the board of trustees of what is now Fayetteville State University. Moreover, in 1942, less than a decade after his retirement from Tuskegee, he wrote to the secretary of his MIT class indicating that he had just been released from treatment for an unspecified illness at the Mayo Clinic in Rochester, Minnesota. "Thanks to a kind Providence and skillful physicians," he said, "I am much better now."

== Personal life ==
In 1898, he married Beatrice Rochon Taylor. They had four children, one of whom, Robert Rochon Taylor, became a noted housing advocate in Chicago. Beatrice's younger sister was teacher and pharmacist Etnah Rochon Boutte. After Beatrice died in 1906, Robert remarried in 1912 to Nellie Chestnutt; they had one child.

== Death and legacy ==
He died on December 13, 1942, while attending services in the Tuskegee Chapel, the building that he considered his most outstanding achievement as an architect. He was buried at the Pine Forest Cemetery in Wilmington, North Carolina.

His great-granddaughter, Valerie Jarrett, was a senior advisor to former president Barack Obama.

The Taylor School of Architecture and Construction Science at Tuskegee University is named for Taylor. The housing project in Chicago, Robert Taylor Homes, was named after his son, Robert Rochon Taylor, a civic leader and former Chairman of the Chicago Housing Authority.

The US Postal Service has a postage stamp with his likeness.

== Projects ==
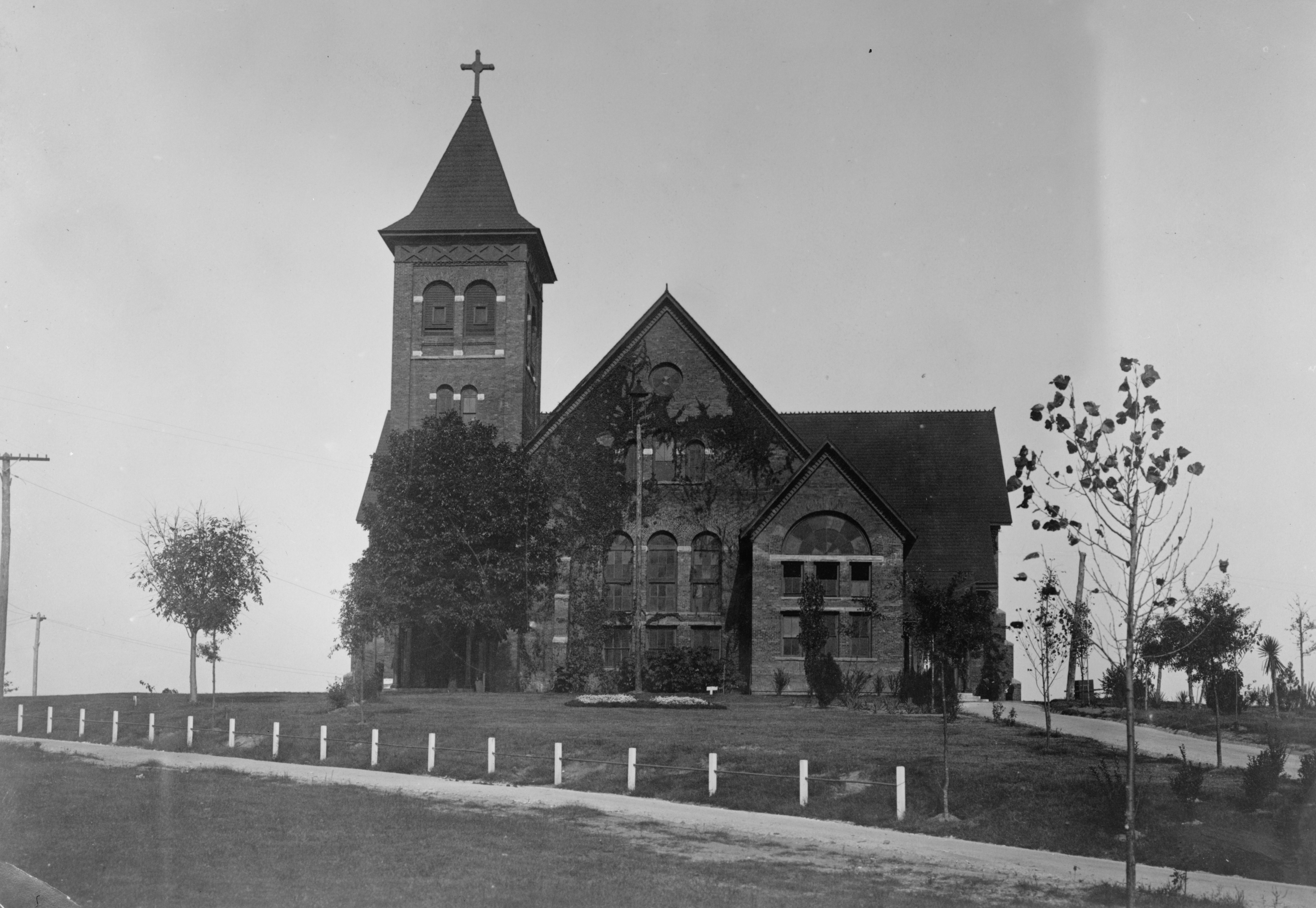
Tuskegee Chapel (1898), which Taylor considered his best work.

Year	Building	Location	Collaborator	Status / notes
1893	Thrasher Hall	Tuskegee Institute		
1898	Tuskegee Chapel	Tuskegee Institute		
1898	The Oaks	Tuskegee Institute		
1900	Huntington Hall	Tuskegee Institute		
1900	Emery dormitories	Tuskegee Institute		Four buildings
1901	Dorothy Hall	Tuskegee Institute		
1901	Women's Trades Building	Tuskegee Institute		
1901	Carnegie Library	Tuskegee Institute		Donated Carnegie library
1901	Alta Settlement House	Cleveland, Ohio	Charles W. Hopkinson	
1902–1903	Administration Building	Tuskegee Institute		
1903	Rockefeller Hall	Tuskegee Institute		
1904	Men's residence Hall	Tuskegee Institute		
1904	Douglass Hall	Tuskegee Institute		
1904–1905	Collis P. Huntington Memorial Building	Tuskegee Institute		Academic building
1907	Tantum Hall	Tuskegee Institute		
1909	Milbank Agriculture Building	Tuskegee Institute		
1910	Tompkins Hall	Tuskegee Institute		Dining facility
1910	White Hall	Tuskegee Institute		Women's dormitory
1913	John A. Andrew Memorial Hospital	Tuskegee Institute		
1915	The George Washington Carver Museum	Tuskegee Institute		Formerly the laundry building
1920	King Administration Building	Wiley College, Marshall, Texas		
1921	James Hall	Tuskegee Institute	Louis H. Persley	
1921	Dinkins Memorial Building	Selma University, Selma, Alabama	Louis H. Persley	
1924	Prince Hall Masonic Temple	Birmingham, Alabama	Louis H. Persley	
1927	Sage Hall	Tuskegee Institute	Louis H. Persley	
1928	Wilcox Trade Buildings	Tuskegee Institute		Architecture buildings
1931	Logan Hall	Tuskegee Institute	Louis H. Persley	Old gym
1932	Armstrong Science Building	Tuskegee Institute	Louis H. Persley	
1932	Hollis Burke Frissell Library	Tuskegee Institute	Louis H. Persley	

== See also ==
- African-American architects
- Robert Charles Bates, an early architecture teacher at Claflin University
