= James E. Bowman =

American geneticist and pathologist (1923–2011)

- Born: James Edward Bowman Jr. February 5, 1923; Washington, D.C.
- Died: September 28, 2011 (aged 88); Chicago, Illinois
- Education: Howard University (BA, MD)
- Spouse: Barbara Taylor (m. 1950)
- Children: Valerie Jarrett
- Scientific career
- Fields: Pathology and Genetics
- Workplaces: University of Chicago Medical School; MacLean Center for Clinical Medical Ethics

James Edward Bowman Jr. (February 5, 1923 – September 28, 2011) was an American physician and specialist in pathology, hematology, and genetics. He was a professor of pathology and genetics at the Pritzker School of Medicine at the University of Chicago. He published more than ninety works across the fields of human genetics; population genetics; and ethical, legal and public policy issues in human genetics. He received many awards, including the Chicago African American History Makers Award and recognition from the Hastings Center and Stanford’s Kaiser Family Foundation, and Howard University.

== Early life and education ==
James Edward Bowman was born on February 5, 1923, in Washington, D.C., the eldest of five children of Dorothy Bowman (née Peterson), a homemaker, and James Edward Bowman Sr., a dentist. His parents were African-American. He attended Dunbar High School before earning his undergraduate and medical degrees from Howard University in 1943 and 1946. He did internships at Freedmen's Hospital in Washington, D.C. and at Provident Hospital in Chicago. His residency in pathology was at St. Luke's Hospital in Chicago where he was the first African American resident, and was certified by the American Board of Pathology in pathologic anatomy (1951) and clinical pathology (1952).

== Career ==
Following residency, Bowman served as chair of pathology at Provident Hospital in Chicago. He was drafted again and spent 1953 to 1955 as chief of pathology for the Medical Nutrition Laboratory at Fitzsimons Army Hospital in Aurora, Colorado. After leaving the military he moved overseas. "My wife and I decided that we were not going to go back to anything that smacked of segregation," he recalled. He became chair of pathology at Nemazee Hospital in Shiraz, Iran. "We were recently married, so we took a chance," he said. "It changed our lives completely." Their daughter, Valerie, was born in Iran.

In Iran, Bowman saw many diseases for the first time. "I saw smallpox, brucellosis, rabies, all sorts of things," he said. One of the most common diseases among certain ethnic groups in Iran was glucose-6-phosphate dehydrogenase deficiency favism, an Inborn error of metabolism metabolic disease caused by an enzyme deficiency in red blood cells. The mutation, which is the most common human enzyme defect, renders those who have it unable to break down a toxin found in fava beans. This led to a series of important discoveries about the genetics of inherited blood diseases and the populations they affect, especially in the Middle East, Africa and America. It enabled him to travel all over the world collecting blood samples for DNA testing. It also led to frequent contacts and collaborations with University of Chicago researchers, who had first described the enzyme deficiency (glucose-6-phosphate dehydrogenase deficiency, or G6PD) and its connection with antimalarial medications.

Bowman joined the faculty of the University of Chicago in 1962 as assistant professor of medicine and pathology and director of the hospital's blood bank. He was promoted to full professor and director of laboratories in 1971. From 1973 to 1984, he directed the university's Comprehensive Sickle Cell Center, funded by the National Institutes of Health. He was a member of the national advisory group that urged the Nixon administration to initiate the inception of the Comprehensive Sickle Cell Center, which served as a model of patient-centered disease management and research. He also served as assistant dean of students for minority affairs for the Pritzker School of Medicine from 1986 to 1990.

In 1972, Bowman stated that mandatory sickle cell screening laws were "more harmful than beneficial." These laws could "revive many of the past misadventures and racism of eugenics movements," he argued at the time, adding that adult screening programs create "inaccurate, misleading, politically motivated propaganda which has left mothers frantic." In 1973, he was named to two federal review committees designed to oversee sickle cell screening and education and to evaluate laboratory diagnostic techniques.

He was the first tenured African-American professor in the University of Chicago's Biological Sciences Division. Upon his death, the University of Chicago established the Bowman Society as an advising group to support minority scholars pursuing careers in the biomedical sciences and to organize a regular lecture series. In 2020, the University appointed the first distinguished professorship in his honor, the James E. Bowman Jr. Professor in the Biological Sciences in the Department of Medicine.

== Personal life ==
Bowman was married to educator Barbara Bowman and they had one daughter, Valerie Bowman Jarrett, who was a Senior Advisor to President Barack Obama.

Bowman died of cancer on September 28, 2011, at the University of Chicago Medical Center, at the age of 88.

== Selected publications ==
Bowman published numerous articles and books, including:

Books

- James E. Bowman; Robert F. Murray (1998). Genetic Variation and Disorders in Peoples of African Origin. Hopkins. ISBN 978-0-8018-5884-0.
- James E. Bowman (1983). Distribution and Evolution of Hemoglobin and Globin Loci. Proceedings of the Fourth Annual Comprehensive Sickle Cell Center Symposium on the Distribution and Evolution of Hemoglobin and Globin Loci at the University of Chicago, Chicago, Illinois, U.S.A., October 10–12, 1982. Elsevier. ISBN 978-0-444-00793-3.

Journal articles

- James E. Bowman; Robert R. Brubaker; Henri Frischer; Paul E. Carson (September 1967). "Characterization of Enterobacteria by Starch-Gel Electrophoresis of Glucose-6-Phosphate Dehydrogenase and Phosphogluconate Dehydrogenase". Journal of Bacteriology. 94 (3). American Society for Microbiology: 544–551. doi:10.1128/JB.94.3.544-551.1967. PMC 251920. PMID 5340676.
- Shaw, Richard F.; Ruth Winter Bloom; James E. Bowman (September 1977). "Hemoglobin and the genetic code: Evolution of Protection against Somatic Mutation". Journal of Molecular Evolution. 9 (3). Springer New York: 225–230. doi:10.1007/BF01796111. PMID 864725. S2CID 22791671.
- James E. Bowman (May 1989). "Legal and Ethical Issues in Newborn Screening". Pediatrics. 83 (5): 894–896. doi:10.1542/peds.83.5.894. S2CID 5438059.
- James E. Bowman (March 1991). "Prenatal screening for hemoglobinopathies". American Journal of Human Genetics. 48 (3): 433–438. PMC 1682982. PMID 1998329.
- James E. Bowman (1998). "Minority Health Issues and Genetics". Community Genetics — Public Health Genomics. 1 (3): 142–144. doi:10.1159/000016152. PMID 11657303. S2CID 20895819.
- James E. Bowman; Giselle Corbie-Smith; Peter Lurie; Sidney M. Wolfe; Arthur L. Caplan; George J. Annas; Amy L. Fairchild; Ronald Bayer (July 2, 1999). "Tuskegee as a Metaphor". Science. 285 (5424): 47–8, author reply 49–50. doi:10.1126/science.285.5424.47b. PMID 10428701. S2CID 13474385.
- James E. Bowman (June 2000). "Technical, Genetic, and Ethical Issues in Screening and Testing of African-Americans for Hemochromatosis". Genetic Testing. 4 (2): 207–212. doi:10.1089/10906570050114920. PMID 10953961.
- James E. Bowman (Autumn 2001). "Genetic Medicine: A Logic of Disease (review)". Perspectives in Biology and Medicine. 44 (4). The Johns Hopkins University Press: 617–618. doi:10.1353/pbm.2001.0061. S2CID 72446596.

== See also ==
- List of African American inventors and scientists
