= Robert Rochon Taylor =

American housing activist

Robert Rochon Taylor (April 12, 1899 – March 1, 1957) was an American housing advocate and banker. A founder of the Illinois Federal Savings and Loan, a mortgager for black residents of Chicago's South Side, Taylor was the first black member of the Chicago Housing Authority and later its chairman. Robert Taylor Homes, a public housing project completed in 1962, was named for Taylor.

== Biography ==
Taylor was born in 1899 in Tuskegee, Alabama. Taylor was the son of Robert Robinson Taylor, an architect and professor at the Tuskegee Institute, and Beatrice Rochon Taylor, a Louisiana Creole and daughter of a Reconstruction-era state legislator from St. Martinville, Louisiana. He studied architecture at Howard University, then completed his bachelor's degree in business at the University of Illinois in 1925.

First practicing as an architect in Chicago, Taylor began financing real estate projects. In addition to building many single family homes on the South Side, Taylor managed the Michigan Boulevard Garden Apartments, among the first subsidized rental apartments meant to house black residents. The project was financially backed by Sears Roebuck president Julius Rosenwald. In 1934, Taylor became general manager of the Illinois Federal Savings and Loan to support mortgage lending to black Chicagoans.

Taylor's successes as a housing financier led to his appointment to the Chicago Housing Authority board in 1938 by Mayor Edward Kelly, who was prodded to do so by economist Robert C. Weaver. Taylor was appointed chairman in 1941 and served until 1950. Working with CHA director Elizabeth Wood, Taylor presided as chair during a period in which more than 92% of new CHA housing units were occupied by black Chicagoans, a marked shift the housing projects of the 1930s built exclusively for whites. He was a strong proponent of scattered-site public housing and desegregation of white Chicago neighborhoods to support black economic mobility.

Taylor resigned after his ideas met resistance from the Chicago City Council. After Taylor's death, the Housing Authority named the South Side's Robert Taylor Homes in his memory, at the time the largest single-site housing project ever built.

Taylor married Laura Dorothy Vaughan Jennings, with whom he had two daughters, Lauretta and Barbara. He died March 1, 1957, in Chicago.
