= Home-based program =

Home visiting services for young children in the United States

Home visiting programs for families with young children have received Federal government support in the United States. A range of programs have been implemented, with evaluation of their effectiveness in terms of health, social and educational outcomes.

== History ==
In 2010, the federal Affordable Care Act initiated the Maternal, Infant, and Early Childhood Home Visiting Program that allocates $1.5 billion over five years to states that voluntarily provide families with young children with evidence-based home visiting programs. It aims to establish a positive and improved outcome in health, education, and reduced child abuse in families. Home visiting has already been in practice in every state.

== Purpose of enactment ==
The purpose of federal funding is to identify the most effective early childhood home visiting programs and strengthen them with standards that will produce measurable and efficient outcomes. As of October 2013, 17 states have introduced 32 bills on Home Visiting Programs before legislature. Beginning September 2010, the Department of Health and Human Services (HHS) awarded grants to states to develop and implement an early childhood home visitation program to promote. 1. Improvements in maternal and prenatal health, 2. Infant health, 3. Child health and development, 4. Parenting related to child development outcomes, and 5. School readiness in child abuse, neglect and injuries.

== Programs ==
Several national Home Visiting Programs have developed and attained standards for successful training and home visiting cases for home visitors as well as for the program supervisors. States and local programs may use these models to establish a program but some local programs also may customize and tailor their programs according to their local needs by utilizing local resources and institutions. Local programs may follow some of elements from the national programs and integrate them, which create varieties of practice models, depending on the needs and availability of the local communities. The local models may not have evidence of consistent outcomes.

The seven federally approved home visiting models are:

1. Early Head Start – Home Based Option
2. Family Check Up
3. Healthy Families America (HFA)
4. Healthy Steps
5. Home Instruction for Parents of Preschool Youngsters (HIPPY)
6. Nurse-Family Partnership (NFP)
7. Parents as Teachers (PAT)

There are other programs also in review for federal approval. When states apply and are granted of the federal funds, federal legislation provides guidelines on how to specifically distribute the money. For example, at least 75% of the funds must be apportioned on programs that follow one of the approved home visiting models. The rest of the money may be allocated for "promising approaches", where they have shown some evidence of effectiveness, but yet to have strong assessment of evidence. Local programs may apply for funding in this classification.

== Implementation ==
=== Home visitors ===
Home visitors are trained professionals who focus on early childhood and maternal health; they may be nurses, social workers, or early childhood specialists with additional training. Their scope of practice includes children and maternal health, parenting and family education, child abuse and neglect. Home visitors provide education and resources to parents in multiple layers, such as educating on normal trajectory of early childhood, identifying abnormal development or modifying problematic behavior, offering referrals to community resources, such as Medicaid, job training, employment services, or food assistance. They also provide mental health counseling to parents who may have substance abuse problems, or maternal depression.

=== Target ===
Home visiting services aim to support families who are most disadvantaged, or at risk. This population includes first time parents, low-income parents, single or teen parents, as well as parents with substance abuse or addictions, or mental health issues such as maternal depression.

== Benefit ==
=== Evidence-based practices ===
Evidence-based practice means that there has been a set of standards of practices established from clinically proved trials and researches that produced consistently improved outcomes. Individual clinician's training and organizational and systems changes could influence the implementation of clinical guidelines. The review of home visiting programs reports that intensive and frequent visits from trained professionals to families from the prenatal stage up to the second or third years of the child's life produces a positive and improved outcome in maternal and child's health. The frequency could be as often once a week to at least once or twice every month in the beginning stage of home visits.

=== Evidence ===
Quality practices offered by well-trained home visitors in Home Visiting Programs have been shown to be effective in these areas: lower number of low birth weight babies, 50% decrease in child abuse or neglect, 25% increase in reading and math test grades in 1-3 grades, 60% increase in high school graduation rate. If trained visitors diligently follow the standards, the cost-benefit studies have demonstrated returns of investment from $1.75 to $5.70 on every dollar spent.

== Cost ==
=== Federal funding ===
Social Security Act, Title V, Section 511 (42 USC 711) states to conduct a statewide assessment on needs of the at-risk population to be eligible for the grant award. It also requires states to achieve "quantifiable, measurable improvements" on the five areas of family life, listed above. HHS appropriates $100 million for fiscal year 2010, $250 million for FY 2011, $350 million for FY 2012, $400 million for FY 2014. 3% of available funding is reserved to fund Indian Tribes.

=== Responsibility of States ===
States also must file a report to the Secretary of HHS on the progress of the program, which must show improvements on at least four areas at the end of the first three-year period. HHS holds authority to terminate the grant to any states that fail to comply or demonstrate improvements. A final report must be submitted to HHS, no later than December 31, 2015.

== Bibliography ==
- Early Care and Education Legislation Database. Retrieved Oct 22, 2013. Updated October 21, 2013.
