= Erikson Institute =

Graduate School in Chicago, Illinois, United States

Coordinates: 41.890661°N 87.632088°W

- Type: Private graduate school
- Established: 1966; 60 years ago
- Endowment: $76.6 million (2025)
- President: Mariana Souto-Manning
- Faculty: 26
- Administrative staff: 51
- Postgraduates: 300
- Location: Chicago, Illinois, United States
- Campus: Urban
- Website: www.erikson.edu

Erikson Institute is a private graduate school focused on child development and located in Chicago, Illinois. It is named for psychoanalyst and developmental psychologist Erik Erikson.

== History ==
The institute was founded in 1966 by four child advocates: child psychologist Maria Piers, educator and activist Barbara Taylor Bowman, social worker Lorraine Wallach, and businessman and philanthropist Irving B. Harris. It was established to provide training for people working in the recently created Head Start program. Its original mission was to educate early childhood teachers and caregivers. The mission has expanded to the education of anyone who works with or on behalf of young children.

Erikson is led by its fifth president, Mariana Souto-Manning, who assumed the role on September 1, 2021. She succeeded Geoffrey Nagle, who ended his term as president and CEO in February of that year. Previous presidents include Samuel J. Meisels, who left Erikson to become founding executive director of the University of Nebraska–Lincoln's Buffett Early Childhood Institute.

== Academics ==
Erikson Institute is accredited by the Higher Learning Commission. It offers master's degrees in child development, early childhood education, and social work. The institute also offers certificate programs and professional development opportunities.

== Community Service ==
Erikson Institute operates a range of community programs focused on supporting the developmental needs of young children and their caregivers. Established in 2003, the institute's Fussy Baby Network operates a free, bilingual warmline and provides in-home visits for caregivers struggling with their infants’ crying, eating or sleeping habits. Erikson also operates the DCFS Early Childhood Project in partnership with the Illinois Department of Children and Family Services, where they provide early intervention and mental health support to young children and families involved in the child welfare system.
