= Myron (given name) =

Myron (Ukrainian: Мирон) is a masculine given name used in English-speaking and Eastern European countries including Romania, Ukraine and Russia (in the countries of the former USSR it is usually spelled Miron, except for Ukraine where Myron is used). Non-religious or Christianized Jews have used this name as a Gentile replacement of the Jewish name Meir.

The name was originally in honor of the ancient Greek sculptor Myron (Greek Μύρων), whose name meant 'myrrh, perfume'. The female equivalent of Myron is considered to be Myra. Among modern Greeks, it may be in honor of Saint Myron, archbishop of Crete (c. 250 – 350), and may take the form Myros, with the vocative Myro.

Notable people bearing the name include:

== Ancient world ==
- Myron, Athenian sculptor from the mid-5th century BC
- Myron of Crete (c. 250-c. 350), archbishop of Crete
- Myron of Priene, ancient Greek author of an historical account of the First Messenian War

== Modern era ==
Note: Some individuals are listed in multiple subsections.

=== Arts and entertainment ===
- Myron Brinig (1896–1991), Jewish-American novelist
- Myron Butler (born 1974), American gospel musician, record producer, singer-songwriter, music director, vocalist, organist, and pianist
- Myron Cohen (1902–1986), American comedian and raconteur
- Myron Coureval Fagan (1887–1972), American writer, producer, and film and theater director
- Myron Fink (born 1932), American opera composer
- Myron Floren (1919–2005), American accordionist and band leader
- Myron Healey (1923–2005), American actor
- Myron Kaufmann (1921–2010), American novelist
- Myron Kerstein, American film editor
- Myron Holly Kimball (1827–1912), American photographer, real estate speculator, and collector
- Myron W. Krueger (born 1942), American computer artist
- Myron Levoy (1930–2019), American author
- Myron McCormick (1908–1962), American actor
- Myron Michailidis (born 1968), Greek conductor
- Myron Nettinga (born 1967), American Oscar-winning sound engineer
- Myron Noodleman (1958–2017), American sports clown
- Myron Reed (wrestler) (born 1996), American professional wrestler
- Myron Rosander (1960–2015), American designer and musician
- Myron Selznick (1898–1944), American film producer and talent agent
- Myron Stout (1908–1987), American abstract painter
- Myron Walden (born 1972), American jazz musician
- Myron Waldman (1908–2006), American animator and director at Fleischer Studios and Famous Studios
- Myron W. Whitney (1836–1910), American opera singer

=== Architecture ===
- Myron Goldfinger, American architect
- Myron Goldsmith (1918–1996), American architect and designer
- Myron Hunt (1868–1952), American architect

=== Business ===
- Myron Blank (1911–2005), American movie theater chain head and philanthropist
- Myron Cottrell, American automotive entrepreneur
- Myron Fass (1926–2006), American publisher
- Myron T. Herrick (1854–1929), American banker, diplomat, and politician
- Myron Holly Kimball (1827–1912), American photographer, real estate speculator, and collector
- Myron Kunin (1928–2013), American businessman and art collector
- Myron Charles Taylor (1874–1959), American industrialist and diplomat
- Myron E. Ullman (born 1946), American retail chief executive
- Myron W. Wentz (born 1940), American-born Mexican chief executive
- Myron H. Wilson (1887–1962), American businessman and insurance executive

=== Journalism ===
- Myron Angel (1827–1911), American historian and journalist
- Myron Davis (1919–2010), American photojournalist
- Myron Kolatch (born 1929), American magazine editor
- Myron Lowery, American mayor, politician, and former television news anchor
- Myron Magnet (born 1944), American journalist and historian
- Myron Mike Wallace (1918–2012), American television news reporter and anchor for 60 Minutes

=== Medicine ===
- Myron S. Cohen (born 1950), American physician-scientist
- Myron Prinzmetal (1908–1987), American cardiologist and researcher
- Myron Rolle (born 1986), Bahamian-American neurosurgeon and former football safety
- Myron L. Weisfeldt (born 1940), American cardiologist and physician-scientist

=== Military ===
- Myron C. Cramer (1881–1966), American Army general, Judge Advocate General during World War II
- Myron Dobashi (born 1943), American retired National Guard brigadier general
- Myron F. Diduryk (1938–1970), American Army major
- Myron H. Ranney (1845/1846–1910), American Civil War soldier awarded the Medal of Honor
- Myron Tarnavsky (1869–1938), supreme commander of the Ukrainian Galician Army of the West Ukrainian People's Republic

=== Politics and the law ===
- Myron Abell (1864-1940), American politician
- Myron Atkinson (1927–2017), American politician
- Myron H. Bright (1919–2016), American lawyer and jurist
- Myron H. Clark (1806–1892), American politician
- Myron M. Cowen (1898–1965), American lawyer and diplomat
- Myron Donovan Crocker (1915–2010), American district judge
- Myron Demkiw (born 1965 or 1966), Chief of Police of Toronto, Canada
- Myron Dorn (born 1954), American senator
- Myron Dossett (born 1961), American politician
- Myron Henry Feeley (1885–1976), American-born Canadian politician
- Myron V. George (1900–1972), American politician
- Myron B. Gessaman (1894–1975), American politician
- Myron L. Gordon (1918–2009), American federal judge
- Myron T. Herrick (1854–1929), American banker, diplomat, and politician
- Myron Holley (1779–1841), American politician
- Myron Just (born 1941), American politician and farmer
- Myron Kowalsky (1941–2022), Canadian politician and teacher
- Myron Kulas (born 1942), Ukrainian-American politician
- Myron Lawrence (1799–1852), American lawyer and politician
- Myron E. Leavitt (1930–2004), American politician
- Myron P. Lindsley (1825–1883), American attorney and politician
- Myron Lizer, Native American politician
- Myron P. Lotto (1925–2017), American politician
- Myron Lowery, American mayor, politician, and former television news anchor
- Myron H. McCord (1840–1908), American politician
- Myron S. McNeil (1873–1944), American politician and state senator
- Myron Newton Morris (1810–1885), American minister and politician
- Myron Neth (born 1968), American politician
- Myron Norton (1822–1886), American attorney and soldier, drafter of California's first state constitution
- Myron Olson (1928–1992), American politician
- Myron Orfield (born 1961), American law professor
- Myron Penn (born 1972), American former lawyer and politician
- Myron Reed (politician) (1836–1907), American senator
- Myron W. Reed (1836–1899), American political activist
- Myron T. Steele, American former chief justice and state court judge
- Myron Sulzberger (1878–1956), Jewish-American lawyer, politician, and judge
- Myron Thompson (1936–2019), Canadian politician
- Myron H. Thompson (born 1947), American district court judge
- Myron Tsosie, 21st century American politician
- Myron Walwyn (born 1972), British Virgin Islands lawyer and politician
- Myron Weiner (1931–1999), American political scientist
- Myron B. Williams (c. 1817–1884), American lawyer, politician, and pioneer
- Myron Wolf Child (1983–2007), Canadian youth activist, public speaker, and politician
- Myron B. Wright (1847–1894), American politician

=== Religion ===
- Myron Winslow Adams (1860–1939), American clergyman and educator
- Myron Augsburger (born 1929), American Mennonite pastor, professor, theologian, and author
- Myron J. Cotta (born 1953), American Roman Catholic prelate
- Myron Daciuk (1919–1996), Canadian Ukrainian Greek Catholic hierarch
- Myron Henry Phelps (1856–1916), American religious writer

=== Science and academics ===
- Myron L. Bender (1924–1988), American biochemist
- Myron Brakke (1921–2007), American biochemist and microbiologist
- Myron Henry Clark (1881–1953), American chemical engineer, management consultant, and college director
- Myron S. Cohen (born 1950), American physician-scientist
- Myron L. Coulter (1929–2011), American university professor, administrator, and president/chancellor
- Myron L. Good (1923–1999), American physicist
- Myron Gordon (biologist) (1899–1959), American ichthyologist
- Myron J. Gordon (1920–2010), American economist
- Myron Arms Hofer (born 1931), American psychiatrist and research scientist
- Myron Korduba (1876–1947), Ukrainian historian, professor, and author
- Myron Samuel Malkin (1924–1994), American physicist and first director of the Space Shuttle program
- Myron Mathisson (1897–1940), Polish theoretical physicist
- Myron Prinzmetal (1908–1987), American cardiologist and researcher
- Myron Rush (1922–2018), American Kremlinologist
- Myron Scholes (born 1941), Canadian economist and Nobel Prize winner, a co-author of Black–Scholes model for option pricing
- Myron Sharaf (1926–1997), American writer and psychotherapist
- Myron Seiliger (1874–1952), Russian physicist
- Myron Solberg (1930–2001), American food scientist
- Myron Stolaroff (1920–2013), American author, inventor, and drug researcher
- Myron Tribus (1921–2016), American organizational theorist and educator
- Myron L. Weisfeldt (born 1940), American cardiologist and physician-scientist
- Myron E. Witham (1880–1973), American mathematician, football player, and football and baseball coach
- Myron P. Zalucki (born 1954), Australian entomologist

=== Sports ===
- Myron Allen (1854–1924), American Major League Baseball (MLB) player
- Myron Anyfantakis (born 1939), Greek javelin thrower
- Myron Baker (born 1971), American former National Football League (NFL) player
- Myron Bell (born 1971), American former NFL player
- Myron Bereza (1936–2012), Canadian soccer player
- Myron Boadu (born 2001), Dutch footballer
- Myron van Brederode (born 2003), Dutch footballer
- Myron Brown (born 1969), American former basketball player
- Myron Cope (1929–2008), American sports journalist, radio personality, and sportscaster
- Myron Moe Drabowsky (1935–2006), American MLB pitcher
- Myron Dupree (born 1961), American former NFL player
- Myron Fernandes (born 1993), Indian footballer
- Myron Fohr (1912–1994), American racecar driver
- Myron Fuller (1889–1949), American football player and coach
- Myron Gardner (born 2001), American basketball player
- Myron Grimshaw (1875–1936), American MLB player
- Myron Guyton (born 1967), American former football player
- Myron Jackson (born 1964), American retired National Basketball Association (NBA) player
- Myron Lapka (born 1956), American former NFL player
- Myron Lewis (born 1987), American former NFL player
- Myron Markevych (born 1951), Ukrainian former footballer and current head coach of Metalist Kharkiv
- Myron Mitchell (born 1998), American gridiron football player
- Myron Noodleman (1958–2017), American sports clown
- Myron Pottios (born 1939), American former NFL player
- Myron Pryor (born 1986), American former NFL player
- Myron Roderick (1934–2011), American wrestler, head college coach of wrestling and tennis, and college athletics administrator
- Myron Rolle (born 1986), Bahamian-American neurosurgeon and former football safety
- Myron Samuel (born 1992), Vincentian footballer
- Myron Scott (1907–1998), American creator of the Soap Box Derby
- Myron Shongwe (born 1981), South African footballer
- Myron Sifakis (born 1960), Greek retired goalkeeper and current football manager
- Myron Simpson (born 1990), New Zealand road and track cyclist
- Myron Spaulding (1905–2000), American sailor, yacht designer and builder, and concert violinist
- Myron Stankiewicz (born 1935), Canadian retired National Hockey League player
- Myron Stevens (1901–1988), American racecar driver and builder
- Myron Stevens (American football), American college football player
- Myron Tagovailoa-Amosa (born 1999), American football player
- Myron White (1957–2018), American MLB player
- Myron E. Witham (1880–1973), American football player, football and baseball coach, and mathematics professor
- Myron Worobec (born 1944), Ukrainian-American former footballer

=== Other fields ===
- Myron Avery (1899–1952), American lawyer, hiker, and explorer
- Myron Ebell (born 1952/1953), American climate change denier
- Myron Field, American bridge player
- Myron M. Kinley (1898–1978), American pioneering oil well firefighter
- Myron Mixon (born 1962), American celebrity chef
- Myron "Pinky" Thompson (1924–2001), Hawaiian social worker and community leader
- Myron Thomas (1916–1987), American coal miner, hero of the Knox Mine Disaster
