= Miron =

Miron or Mirón may refer to:

- Miron (name)
- Miron (surname)
- El Mirón, a municipality in Ávila, Castile and León, Spain
- El Mirón Cave, in the upper Asón River valley, Cantabria, Spain
- 17049 Miron, 1 minor planet

== See also ==
- Miron Costin (disambiguation)
- Collado del Mirón, a municipality in Ávila, Castile and León, Spain
