= List of presidents of Clark Atlanta University =

The following is a list of presidents of Clark Atlanta University, and a list of the presidents of the precursor schools of Atlanta University and Clark College which merged in 1989.

== Atlanta University ==
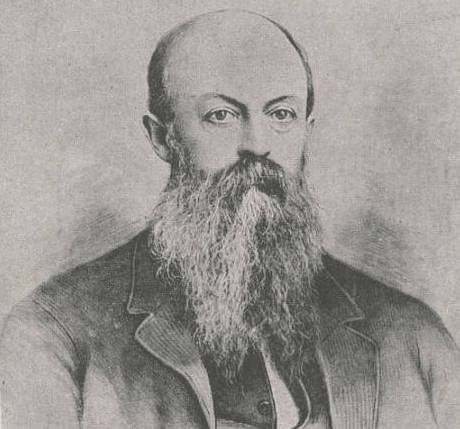
Edmund Asa Ware, first president of Atlanta University

- Edmund Asa Ware, 1869 to 1885
- Thomas S. Chase, 1885 to 1886 (acting)
- Horace Bumstead, 1886 to 1887 (acting)
- Cyrus W. Vance, 1887 to 1888 (acting)
- Horace Bumstead, 1888 to 1907
- Edward Twichell Ware, 1907 to 1922
- Myron Winslow Adams, 1922 to 1923 (acting)
- Myron Winslow Adams, 1923 to 1929
- John Hope, 1929 to 1936
- Florence M. Read, 1936 to 1937
- Rufus Early Clement, 1937 to 1967
- Thomas D. Jarrett, 1968 to 1969 (acting)
- Thomas D. Jarrett, 1969 to 1977
- Cleveland L. Dennard, 1977 to 1983
- Kofi B. Bota, 1983 to 1984 (acting)
- Luther S. Williams, 1984 to 1987
- Dorcas D. Bowles, 1987 to 1988 (acting)
- Thomas W. Cole, Jr., 1988 to 1989

== Clark College ==
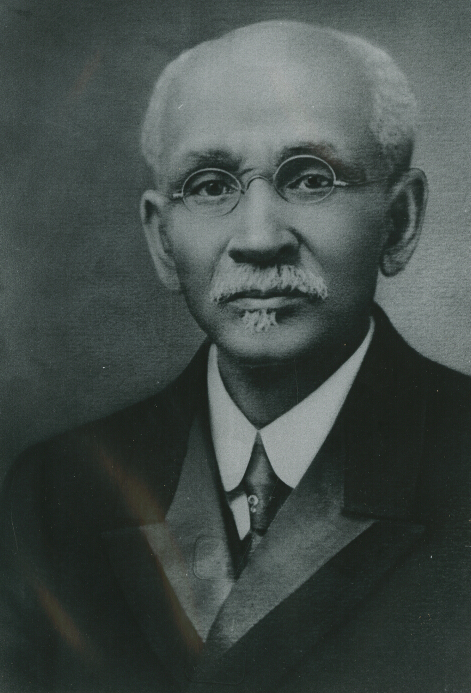
William H. Crogman, eleventh president of Clark College in Atlanta

- D.W. Hammond, 1869 to 1870
- Uriah Cleary, 1870 to 1871
- I. Marcy, 1871 to 1872
- J.B. Martin, 1876 to 1877
- R.E. Bisbee, 1877 to 1881
- E.D. Thayer, 1881 to 1890
- William H. Hickman, 1890 to 1893
- David C. John, 1893 to 1896
- Wilbur P. Thirkield, 1896 to 1897 (acting)
- Charles M. Melden, 1897 to 1903
- William H. Crogman, 1903 to 1910
- G.E. Idleman, 1910 to 1912
- William W. Foster, 1912 to 1915
- Harry A. King, 1915 to 1923
- John W. Simmons, 1923 to 1924
- Matthew Simpson Davage, 1924 to 1940
- James P. Brawley, 1940 to 1941 (acting)
- James P. Brawley, 1941 to 1965
- Vivian H. Henderson, 1965 to 1976
- Charles Knight, 1976 to 1977 (acting)
- Elias Blake, Jr., 1977 to 1987
- Winifred Harris, 1987 to 1988 (acting)
- Thomas W. Cole, Jr., 1988 to 1989

== Clark Atlanta University ==
- Thomas W. Cole, Jr., 1988 to 2002
- Walter D. Broadnax, 2002 to 2008
- Carlton E. Brown, 2008 to 2015
- Ronald A. Johnson, 2015 to 2018
- Lucille H. Maugé, 2018 to 2019 (acting)
- George T. French Jr., 2019 to present
