= J. Murray Hoag =

Union Army officer (1843–1917)

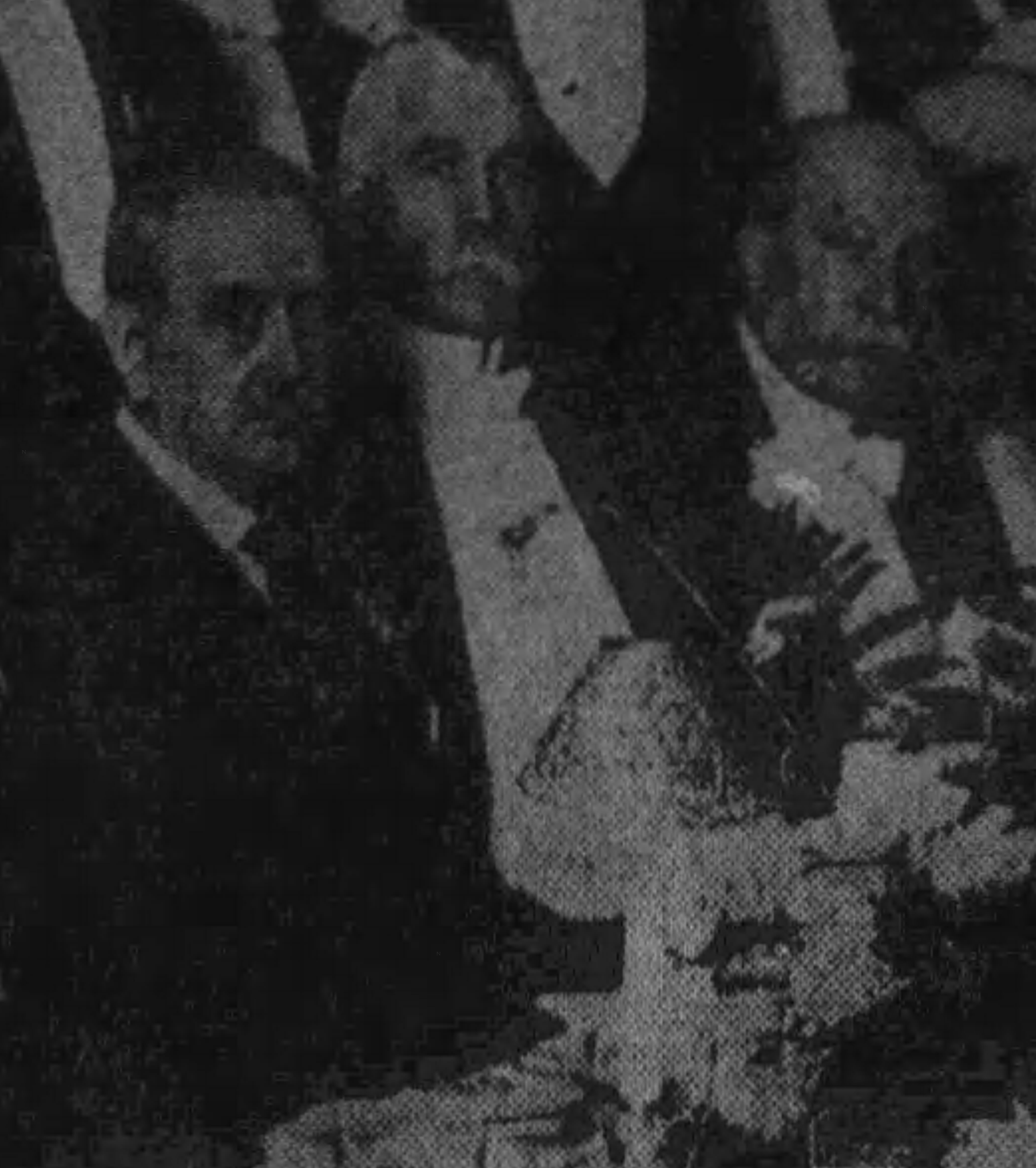
Charles A. Orr, John M. Hoag and Edwin B. Wheeler at a dinner for Civil War veterans in 1912

John Murray Hoag (May 5, 1843 – December 12, 1917) was a Union Army officer and Freedmen's Bureau official in Georgia during the Reconstruction era. After leaving the Army, he was a prolific breeder of Shetland ponies in Iowa. Later in life, he returned to the Army as a recruiter in New York.

His correspondence with Hettie Sabattie, a school teacher of African American children, was analyzed in the Georgia Historical Quarterly to better understand Reconstruction era events in Georgia.

== Early life and Civil War ==
Hoag was born May 5, 1843. In 1862 he enlisted with the Union Army in Walworth, New York, joining Company B of the 9th New York Heavy Artillery Regiment as a private. He left the regiment in May 1863 and in August was commissioned 2nd Lieutenant of the 4th United States Colored Infantry Regiment.

He lost his arm at Fort Harrison, Virginia, in the Battle of Chaffin's Farm in late September 1864. He was cited for gallant action, "While suffering from fever and on the sick list, he insisted on leading his company, was wounded in two places, and fell 'at the enemy's inner line of abatis'". He was promoted to Brevet Lieutenant Colonel, and mustered out of service as Captain of the Fourth Colored Troops, as reported in the Army and Navy Journal on February 2, 1867.

== Freedmen's Bureau ==
He was transferred from his regiment to duty in Georgia for the Freedmen's Bureau in May 1866. He was assigned to Savannah, Georgia, where he was responsible for supervising schools in southeast Georgia, particularly Savannah and Georgia's Sea Islands. His supervisor was Edmund Asa Ware. His work entailed hiring construction workers and teachers, establishing tuition, opening and closing schools, and supplying rations to African American settlements along coast of Georgia. Supplying food could be fraught with tension, as Bureau policy was that able-bodied laborers should not be provided with free provisions, but such laborers would often abandon their farm work to work for food, which hurt their eventual yield. Hoag advocated against the policy, suggesting providing provisions on credit until harvest. He generally felt that political activism among the African American population was harming their well-being, and that politics took up time that would be better spent in economic activity. Hoag's work brought him close to the American Missionary Association (AMA), which provided many of the teachers educating the former slaves, and Hoag was respected by the AMA's teachers.

He investigated and reported on violent confrontations between whites and African Americans, including an election-related riot. His statement to the U.S. Congress was among the many harrowing accounts of violent attacks on African Americans, theft of property, attacks on persons attempting to organize voters, and largely complicit local law enforcement. Among these was the November 3, 1868, election day riot in Savannah where three African Americans were killed and 17 injured. Hoag testified in contradiction to rumors that the majority of African Americans were armed, placing the blame instead on white Democrats involved.

== Iowa ==
While employed in the Freedmen's Bureau, he courted a New York woman, Ms. Belden, who was visiting her sister in Savannah. He married her in June 1867. His wife's brother was Scott Belden, a civil servant in Nebraska and Iowa.

Around that time, he moved to Maquoketa, Iowa, where he lived for 40 years and conducted one of the largest shetland pony farms in the country. He was elected president of the American Shetland Pony club in 1891 and vice-president in 1893.

In 1895, his was the largest Shetland pony farm in the United States, and he also bred Angora sheep.

== Later life and death ==
In about 1907 he moved to Washington, D.C., and in 1909 he was returned to active duty and transferred to Buffalo, New York, where he took charge of the Army's recruiting station in that city. He retired due to ill health in April 1913. and soon after moved to California.

During his life, he was active in veterans organizations, including the Loyal League and the Grand Army of the Republic.

Hoag died at his home in Los Angeles, California, on December 12, 1917. He was survived by his wife, a sister, and a brother, Benjamin F. Hoag. He was buried at Arlington National Cemetery in Arlington, Virginia.

== Bibliography ==
- Cimbala, Paul A. Under the Guardianship of the Nation: The Freedmen's Bureau and the Reconstruction of Georgia, 1865-1870, University of Georgia Press
- Harris, Leslie M., and Daina Ramey Berry, eds. Slavery and freedom in Savannah, University of Georgia Press, 2014.
- Johnson, Whittington B. A Black Teacher and Her School in Reconstruction Darien : The Correspondence of Hettie Sabattie and J. Murray Hoag, 1868-1869, The Georgia Historical Quarterly, Vol. 75, No. 1 (Spring 1991), pp. 90–105 Published by: Georgia Historical Society JSTOR
- Jones, Jacqueline. Saving Savannah: The City and the Civil War, Vintage, 2008.
- O'Donovan, Susan E. "Transforming Work: Slavery, Free Labor, and the Household in Southwest Georgia, 1850-1880," (Ph.D. diss., University of California, San Diego, 1997)
