= Norman McGrath =

English American architectural photographer

- Born: June 10, 1931 (age 95); London, England
- Citizenship: United States
- Occupation: Architectural photographer
- Years active: 1960s–present

Norman McGrath is an English-American architectural photographer. He first came to prominence in the early 1960s when he photographed the old Pennsylvania Station in New York City before, during, and after its demolition. McGrath then established himself as a leading architectural photographer starting in the 1970s. He has authored books about photography and mentored aspiring photographers.

== Early life ==
McGrath was born in London and grew up in Dublin. His father, Raymond McGrath, was the principle architect for the Irish government and a consulting architect for the BBC. His mother was American. Norman studied engineering at Trinity College Dublin, and worked at an engineering office in Dublin after graduating. He moved to the US in 1956 with the intent of becoming a structural engineer. He became increasingly interested in architectural photography and switched careers in the 1960s.

== Photography career ==
=== Photographing Pennsylvania Station ===
In the early 1960s, McGrath was working for engineering company Wayman C. Wing at their office in the Hotel Pennsylvania, across Seventh Avenue from Penn Station, the monumental train station originally designed in 1910 by McKim, Mead & White. As such, he had a good view of the structure which sat on two full city blocks.

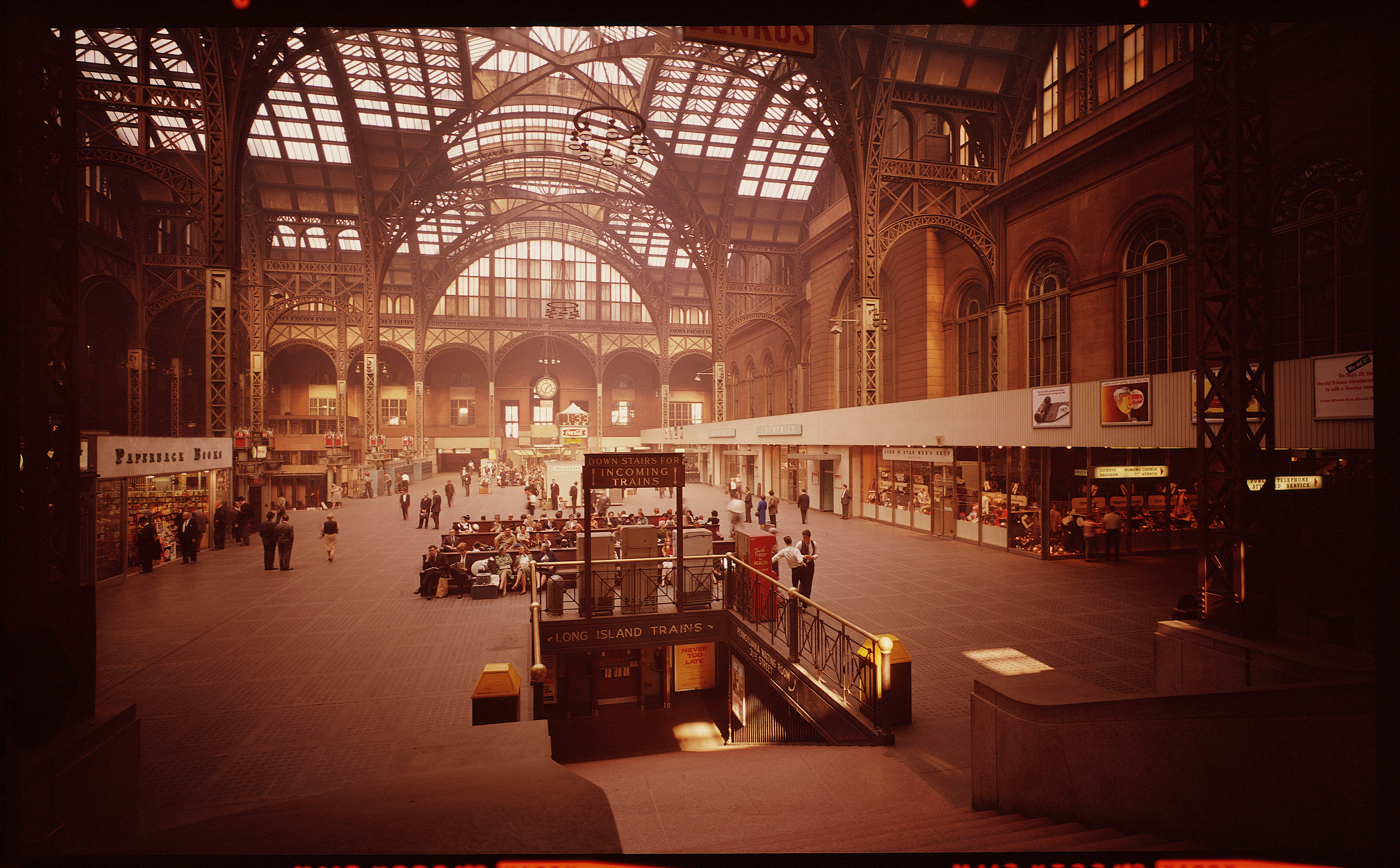
Penn Station, New York 1958

While taking a workshop with Alexey Brodovitch, McGrath decided to choose the station's demolition as a work topic. Once demolition began in 1963, he unofficially documented it from the outside and from the inside. He explained in a 2024 interview, "It was not difficult to gain entrance to the subject; once you figured out a way in, you could come and go almost as you pleased". McGrath did not approach the project with a specific schedule; he noted "I can't tell you precisely how many [days] I went, but I wasn't being paid to do this, so it was mostly when I had the time and the inclination, and the circumstances were right". He continued to take photographs until 1967 or 1968. His photos show the dramatic destruction and new construction. The photos became part of the movement to establish the Landmarks Preservation Commission in New York to protect architectural and historical structures.

=== Later career ===
After establishing himself as a leading architectural photographer, McGrath built a career spanning into the 21st century. He has worked with many architects including Charles Gwathmey, Philip Johnson, Myron Goldfinger, and Hardy Holzman Pfeiffer. He was hired regularly by top architectural publications including Architectural Digest and Progressive Architecture and his photos have appeared on the covers of hundreds of magazines. He also contributed to many general interest publications including The New York Times and Better Homes & Gardens. McGrath also did commercial work for businesses including Bloomingdale's and the Hard Rock Cafe.

He has been recognized for his achievements with an Institute Honor from the AIA (American Institute of Architects) and his selection for the Canon Explorers of Light program. McGrath is still active in 2026.

== Personal life ==
McGrath lives in New York City. He is married to Molly McGrath, a magazine editor with whom he had two children. The couple lived in a home designed by Myron Goldfinger in Patterson, New York.

== Exhibitions ==
- An Eye on Architecture (June 2011), Center for Architecture, New York City

== Publications ==
- Children's Spaces. William Morrow and Company. 1978.; co-authored with Molly McGrath
- Photographing Buildings Inside and Out. 1987.
- New York's Pennsylvania Stations. 2002. (co-author)
