= Miron (name) =

Miron (Russian: Мирон) is a given name. In the countries with the dominant Christian Orthodox church the given name Miron was a local variant of the Greek name Myron.

In French-speaking countries Miron is a surname of unrelated origin, most likely a diminutive of Mire.

Notable people with this given name include:

== People from Israel ==
- Miron Bleiberg, Israeli-Australian football (soccer) manager
- Miron Livny
- Miron Ruina (born 1998), Finnish-Israeli basketball player

== People from Poland ==
- Miron Białoszewski
- Miron Chodakowski

== People from Romania ==
- Miron Cristea
- Miron Constantinescu
- Miron Costin
- Miron Cozma
- Miron Grindea
- Miron Mitrea
- Miron Nicolescu
- Miron Radu Paraschivescu
- Miron Raţiu

== People from Russia ==
- Miron Akimovich Ljubovsky
- Miron Merzhanov
- Miron Vovsi
- Miron Yefimovich Cherepanov
- Miron Yanovich Fyodorov

== People from Ukraine ==
- Myron Markevych

== People from United States ==
- Miron Elisha Hard (1849-1914), American educator and amateur mycologist
- Miron Winslow

== See also ==
- Miron (surname)
