= El Mirón =

- Municipality
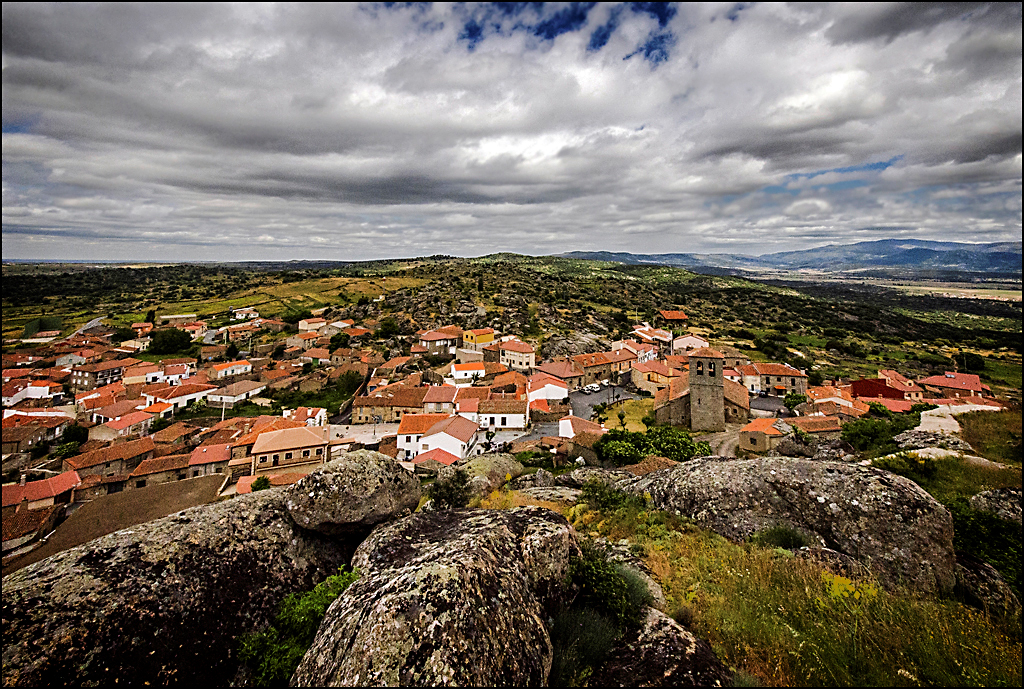
- View of El Mirón

- Flag Coat of arms

- Location in Spain. El Mirón (Spain)
- Coordinates: 40°31′55″N 5°24′19″W
- Country: Spain
- Autonomous community: Castile and León
- Province: Ávila
- Municipality: El Mirón

Area
  - Total: 31.08 km^{2} (12.00 sq mi)
- Elevation: 1,265 m (4,150 ft)

Population (2025-01-01)
  - Total: 93
  - Density: 3.0/km^{2} (7.7/sq mi)
- Time zone: UTC+1 (CET)
  - Summer (DST): UTC+2 (CEST)
- Website: Official website

El Mirón is a municipality located in the province of Ávila, Castile and León, Spain.

The name came into attention upon the discovery an Upper Paleolithic (Magdalenian) skeleton in 2015 from the El Mirón Cave. The skeleton was that of a woman and is coated with ochre (a red pigment), hence she is nicknamed The Red Lady of El Mirón. The woman is about 35 to 40 years of age, and was buried around 18,700 years ago.

== Population ==
Historical population
Year	Pop.	±% p.a.
2023	98	—
2024	98	+0.00%
2025	93	−5.10%
Source: INE
