= Abraham Harry Blank =

American businessman and philanthropist (1879–1971)

Abraham Harry Blank (July 27, 1879 – August 14, 1971) was an American businessman and theater owner who was a major philanthropist in Des Moines, Iowa. The Blank Park Zoo is named for his family.

Blank was born in Galați, Romania, the son of Israel "Isadore" and Miriam (née Greenberg or Greenblatt) Blank. The family emigrated in 1888 and settled in Council Bluffs, Iowa.

Early in his career, Blank was a balloon and novelty salesman in Omaha, Nebraska. He worked as a barker during the Trans-Mississippi Exposition in 1898.

Blank was the founder of the Central States Theater Corporation. Blank owned and operated several large theaters, including the Riviera Theatre in Omaha, Star Theater in Des Moines, the Casino Theater in Davenport, and the Casino Theater in Charles City, Iowa. He also built theaters in Cedar Rapids, Newton, and Waterloo.

He was vice-president of the Iowa Picture Convention, held in 1916.

He and his wife, Anna Levy, established the Raymond Blank Memorial Hospital for Children in 1944 in memory of their son, Raymond. A collection of their family photos are exhibited. Blank met with president Franklin Delano Roosevelt to get construction of the hospital approved during World War II.

His son, Myron Blank, took over the theater business and was also a philanthropist.
