= Myron Blank =

Movie theater chain head

Myron "Mike" Blank (August 30, 1911 – 2005) was a movie theater chain head and philanthropist. He helped popularize popcorn as a theater snack.

His father Abraham Harry Blank was a balloon salesman in Omaha who went on to establish a chain of theaters, Central States Theater Corporation.

The Myron & Jackie Blank Discovery Center at the Blank Park Zoo in Des Moines is named for him and his wife. Their son Alan H. Blank was killed in Mexico while working to establish a zoo.
