= Blank Park Zoo =

Zoo in Des Moines, Iowa, United States

Blank Park Zoo "Iowa's Wildest Adventure"
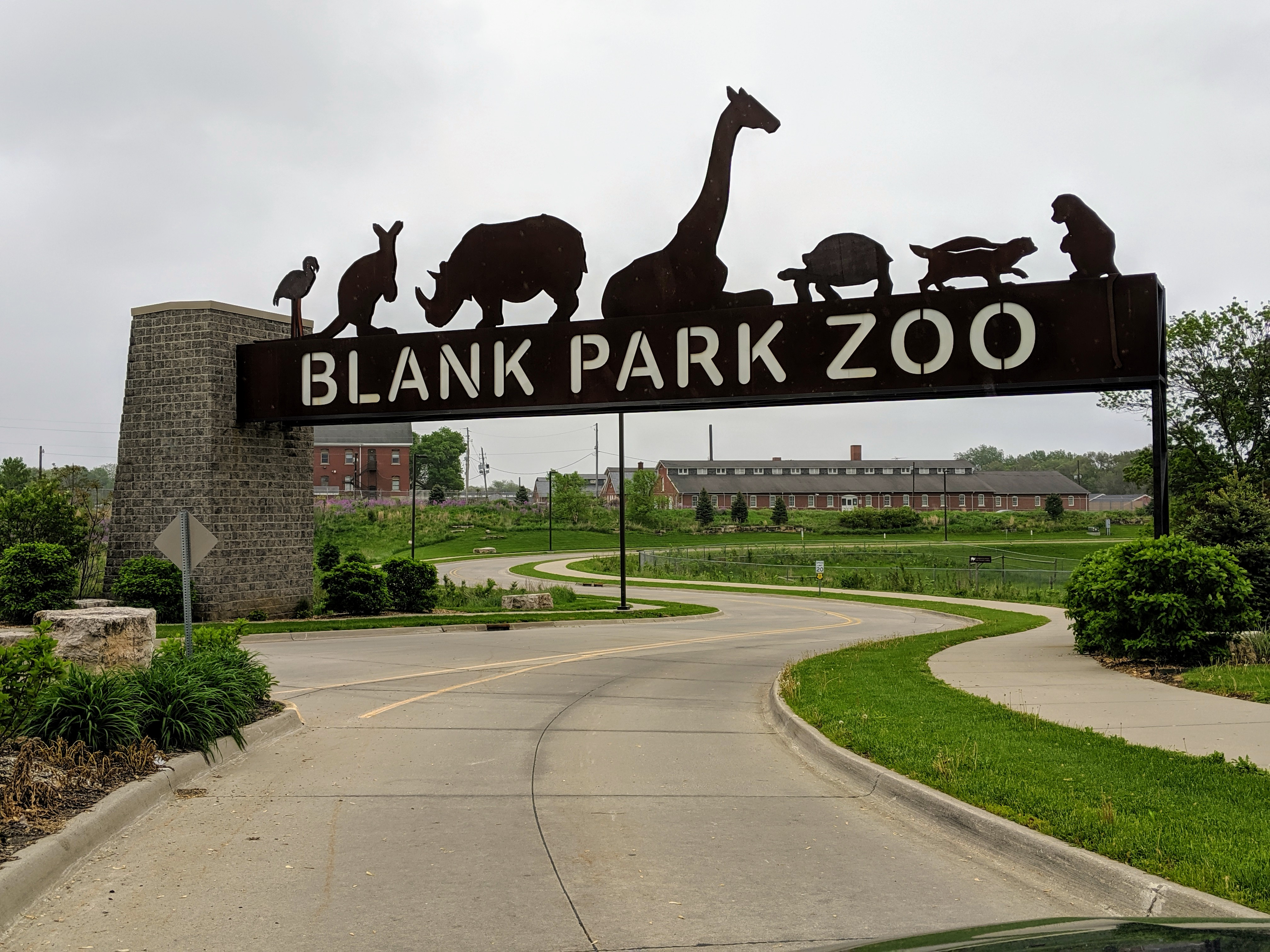
- Blank Park Zoo Entrance
- Interactive map of Blank Park Zoo "Iowa's Wildest Adventure"
- 41.5193°N 93.6242°W
- Date opened: May 8, 1966
- Location: Des Moines, Iowa, United States
- Land area: 49 acres (20 ha)
- No. of animals: 1,500
- No. of species: 100
- Memberships: Association of Zoos and Aquariums
- Major exhibits: Aquarium, Australia Adventure, Big Cat Complex, Discovery Center, Hub Harbor Pinniped Pavilion, Jaama Kwa: Connection to Africa, Kids' Kingdom, The Cave, Tropical Aviary
- Public transit: DART
- Website: www.blankparkzoo.com

Blank Park Zoo is a 49-acre zoological park on the south side of Des Moines, Iowa, United States, near historic Fort Des Moines. The zoo is a member of the Association of Zoos and Aquariums (AZA).

== History ==
In 1963, Abraham Harry Blank donated $150,000 for the construction of a children's zoo on decommissioned Fort Des Moines property. The Des Moines Children’s Zoo was officially opened on May 8, 1966. It was originally designed around nursery rhymes and included a castle with moat, replica of Noah's Ark, petting zoo and miniature railroad.

Over the next 16 years the city failed to make improvements to the zoo, and it was on the verge of closing until in 1981 a group of civic-minded business leaders formed the Blank Park Zoo Foundation to help save the zoo. The foundation's number-one goal was to provide financial support for capital improvements, animal acquisitions and promotional and marketing activities.

The foundation succeeded by forming a partnership with the City of Des Moines that resulted in a $1.8 million bond referendum, as well as an additional $1.4 million from the community. At the end of 1982 the zoo closed for some much needed renovations.

On May 17, 1986, the zoo reopened, featuring geographic themed exhibits with spacious, naturally landscaped environments. In 1987 the zoo was accredited by the AZA.

In 1995 the Blank Park Zoo Foundation purchased 25.3 acres (10.2 ha) of additional historic Fort Des Moines property and nine historic buildings for future growth and expansion of the zoo. It also began a capital campaign to build a new great cats exhibit and a 30,000-square-foot (2,800 m^{2}) indoor Discovery Center exhibit.

On May 1, 1999, the Tom and Jo Ghrist Great Cats exhibit opened, and on September 1, 2001, the Blank Park Zoo opened the Myron & Jackie Blank Discovery Center. On July 1, 2003, the Blank Park Zoo Foundation and City of Des Moines completed a new 28E agreement to transfer the operations and management of the zoo to the foundation. Terry Rich was hired as the zoo's first-ever chief executive officer, marking a new era in zoo history. Initial Spring Break and Holiday Safaris were introduced with much success.

In 2011, new signage and interactives were installed in the Great Cats kiosks, the David Kruidenier Australia Adventure opened featuring the endangered cassowary, the sea lion pool was rebuilt, and a special dinosaur exhibit was open all summer in the Zoo Plex.

The "Big Dig" event was held at Blank Park Zoo to generate excitement about expansion, with 8,000 in attendance.

Behind the scenes a new quarantine facility was constructed to help animal management, and a new veterinarian agreement with Iowa State University was signed.

In 2025, Blank Park Zoo's Expand the Impact initiative broke ground on a new lion habitat, renovations to the Big Cat Complex, and Wild Iowa, which will be home to river otters, eagles and bobcats.

== Major exhibits ==
The Blank Park Zoo contains a variety of wildlife in various exhibits.

=== Myron and Jackie Blank Discovery Center ===
The Discovery Center is an entirely enclosed area visitors encounter first when entering the zoo, and contains various species of plants and animals. The Discovery Center contains separate sections to create a unique viewing experience:

==== Meredith Alpine Exhibit ====
Visitors can find the Meredith Alpine Exhibit at the entrance of the Discovery Center, accessible through the zoo's main visitor lobby. Here, visitors can view the zoo's pair of red pandas from an indoor enclosure with attached travel tunnel, allowing the animals additional space in an outdoor exhibit.

==== The Cave ====
The Cave immediately follows the Meredith Alpine Exhibit and contains most of the zoo's nocturnal animals, alongside a few enclosed reptile exhibits including:

- Madagascar hissing cockroach
- White's tree frog
- Egyptian fruit bat
- Woma Python
- Cuvier's dwarf caiman

==== Free Range Tropical Aviary ====
home to tropical forest-dwelling birds such as the pink pigeon, mountain peacock-pheasant, ringed teal, silver-eared mesia, scarlet-chested parrot, pheasant pigeon, Gouldian finch, sunbittern, common emerald dove, Victoria crowned pigeon, speckled mousebird, and mountain bamboo partridge. Some enclosed exhibits are home to Green Iguana and golden-headed lion tamarins.

==== Aquarium of the Discovery Center ====
The Aquarium of the Discovery Center includes aquatic environments from all around the world. A waterfall feature can be seen above the Amazon River Pool. The pool includes tropical river fish such as tambaqui (Pacu), redtail catfish, and silver arowana. The coral reef exhibit is home to species of aquatic life from coral reefs around the world including coral, sea anemone, clown triggerfish, foureye butterflyfish, clownfish, schooling bannerfish, yellow tang, and Achilles tang.

=== Jaama Kwa: Connection to Africa ===
Opened in spring 2013 at a cost of $4.1 million, the zoo welcomed its new expansion of the existing African Boardwalk on the east side of the park. The expansion brought multiple new species to the zoo, including a pair of the Eastern black rhinoceros, common eland, common ostrich, kori bustard, blue wildebeest, African spurred tortoise, an okapi, nyala, and two red river hogs.

Prior to the expansion, the zoo held a smaller collection of African species, including reticulated giraffe, Hartmann's mountain zebra, addax, rhim gazelle, grey crowned cranes, and helmeted guineafowl. All still reside at the zoo on the renovated boardwalk adjacent to the newly constructed area.

After coming to the zoo in 2012 based on a Species Survival Plan (SSP) recommendation, the zoo's eastern black rhinos Ayana and Kiano welcomed their first calf, female Tumani in 2016. In 2019, a second rhino birth was announced from the same pair. A name contest was conducted by the public with the calf officially being named Kamara in the months following.

The Marjorie A. Foster Lion Conservation Center is set to open in this area in the Summer of 2026.

=== David Kruidenier Australia Adventure ===
Completed in July 2011, this Australian-themed section of the zoo brings visitors into the great Australian outback, which includes an Australian-themed barn, and many animals including double-wattled cassowary, laughing kookaburra, red-necked wallaby, and common peafowl. A specially designed aviary can also be found within this exhibit, homed to the rainbow lorikeet.

=== Kids' Kingdom ===
In late June 2007, the zoo, the Greater Des Moines Leadership Institute, and hundreds of volunteers from around Des Moines built the Kids' Kingdom playground. It includes 5,600 ft^{2} (520 m^{2}) of slides, mazes, monkey bars, sand pits, fossil digs, and mining sluice. This area features many "contact animals" that visitors can feed. Animals in this area include Nigerian dwarf goats, llamas, miniature donkeys, zebu, Meishan pigs, Brahma chickens, koi fish, trumpeter swans, and dromedary camels.

=== Tom and Jo Ghrist Big Cat Complex ===
The cat exhibit opened in 1999 with snow leopards, Amur tigers, and African lions. In 2011, this exhibit got a facelift with new interactive displays and new viewing area rocks. With the lions currently being set to move over to a new exhibit at Jamaa Kwa Africa in 2026, the tigers are currently set to take over a renovated space.

=== Hub Harbor Pinniped Pavilion ===
The new seal/sea lion pool opened on March 17, 2012, after a year of reconstruction to the old pool. The exhibit now features two high-rise viewing areas, as well as an underwater viewing area for the zoo's California sea lions and harbor seals.

Notable residents of the pavilion include Ross and Meru, two harbor seals that came to the Blank Park Zoo from British Columbia. They were rescued off the coast of Canada when they were just five days old, severely malnourished and dehydrated. The Vancouver Marine Mammal Rescue Center nursed them back to health. After examination, the center declared that they were non-releasable due to health disabilities. They found a permanent home at the zoo after the reconstruction of Hub Harbor, where they now reside.

The exhibit welcomed its newest resident, a young sea lion named Meatball, in spring 2020 from the Pacific Marine Mammal Center in California.

=== Miscellaneous animal exhibits ===
In addition to animals in the major exhibits, the zoo includes many individual exhibits that are home to animals including:

- Bald eagles
- Chilean flamingo
- North American river otter
- Aldabra giant tortoise
- Ring-tailed lemurs
- Magellanic penguins
- White-handed gibbons
- Japanese macaque

== Conservation initiatives ==
Starting in 1997, the Blank Park Zoo Conservation Committee has raised funds for a wide variety of worldwide conservation projects. The primary projects of the committee must be international, focus on protecting animals or their natural ecosystems, and have some tie to the Blank Park Zoo. Money is collected through various means such as children's face painting, special event raffles, and coin donation buckets.

In 2012, the Conservation Committee participated in these projects:

- Species Survival Plan – programs set up for endangered species in captivity
- The International Snow Leopard Trust – to protect the natural habitat of snow leopards
- Greater Prairie Chicken Project – helping restore and sustain Iowa's population of native chickens
- Giraffe Conservation Foundation – helping to promote and support giraffe conservation initiatives
- The Great Ape Trust – aimed to rescue orangutans and bonobos in areas of deforestation and poaching
- Panamanian Golden Frogs – aimed to sponsor a program to release captive frogs into the wild

== Gallery ==
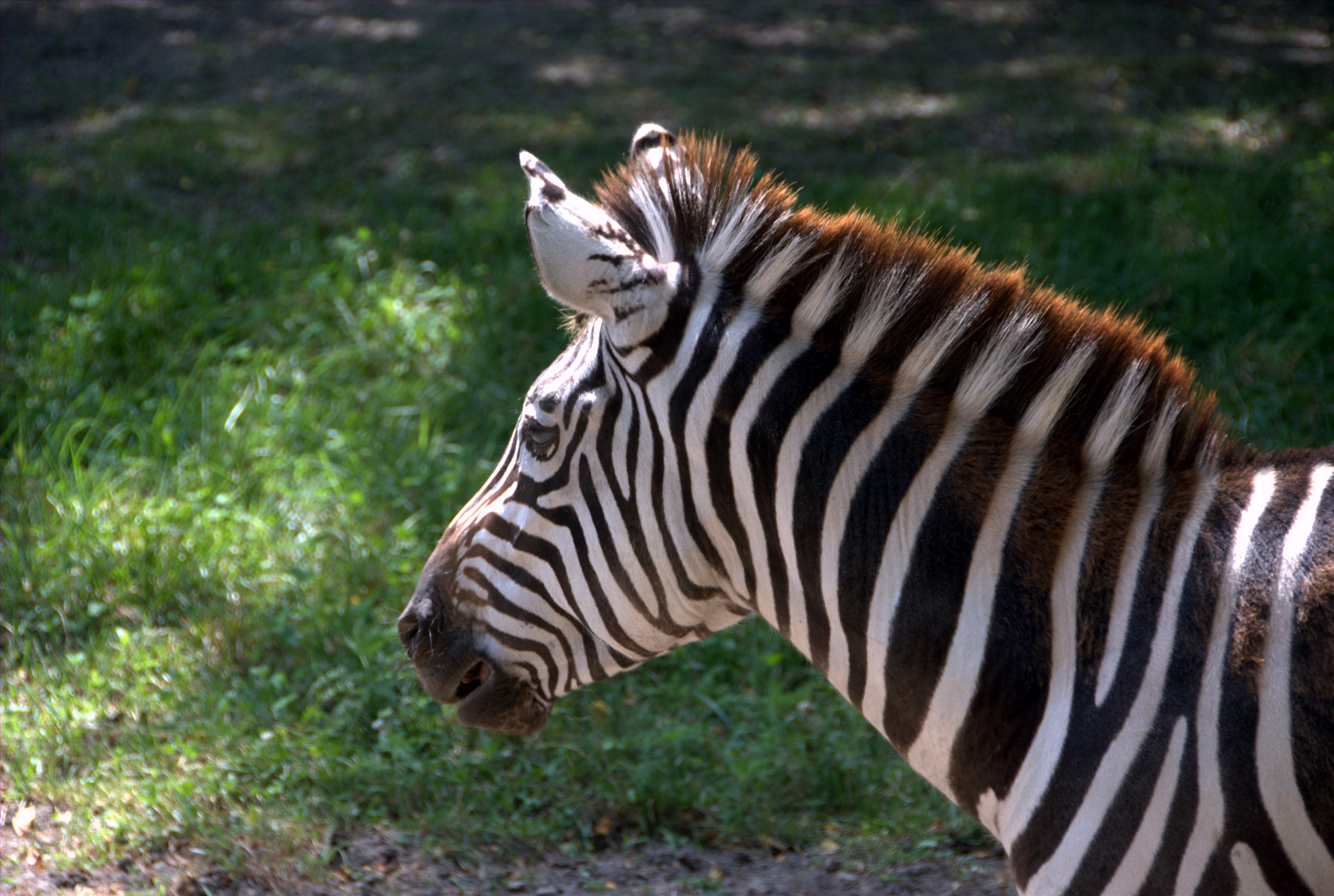
Zebra at the zoo

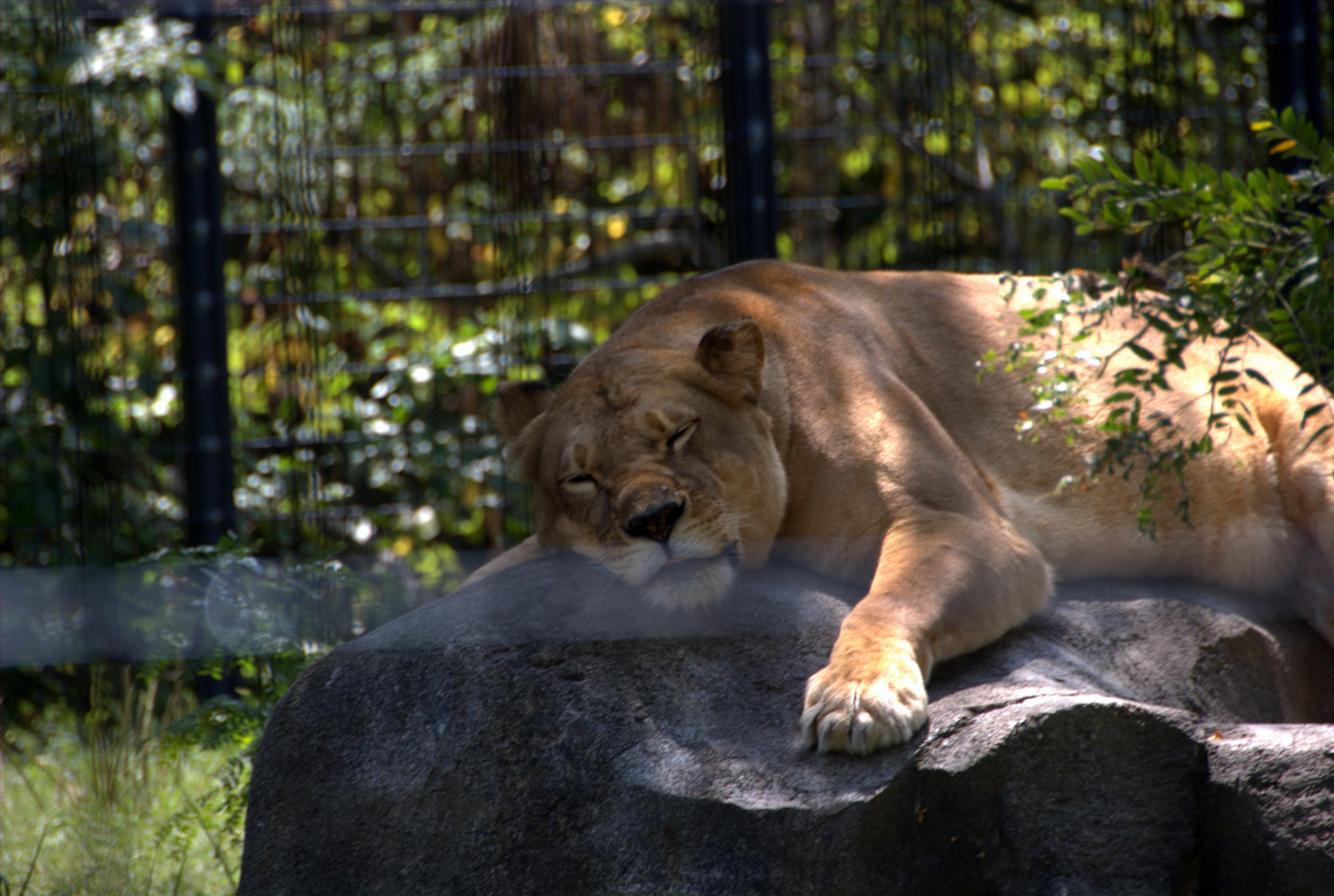
Lion relaxing on a rock

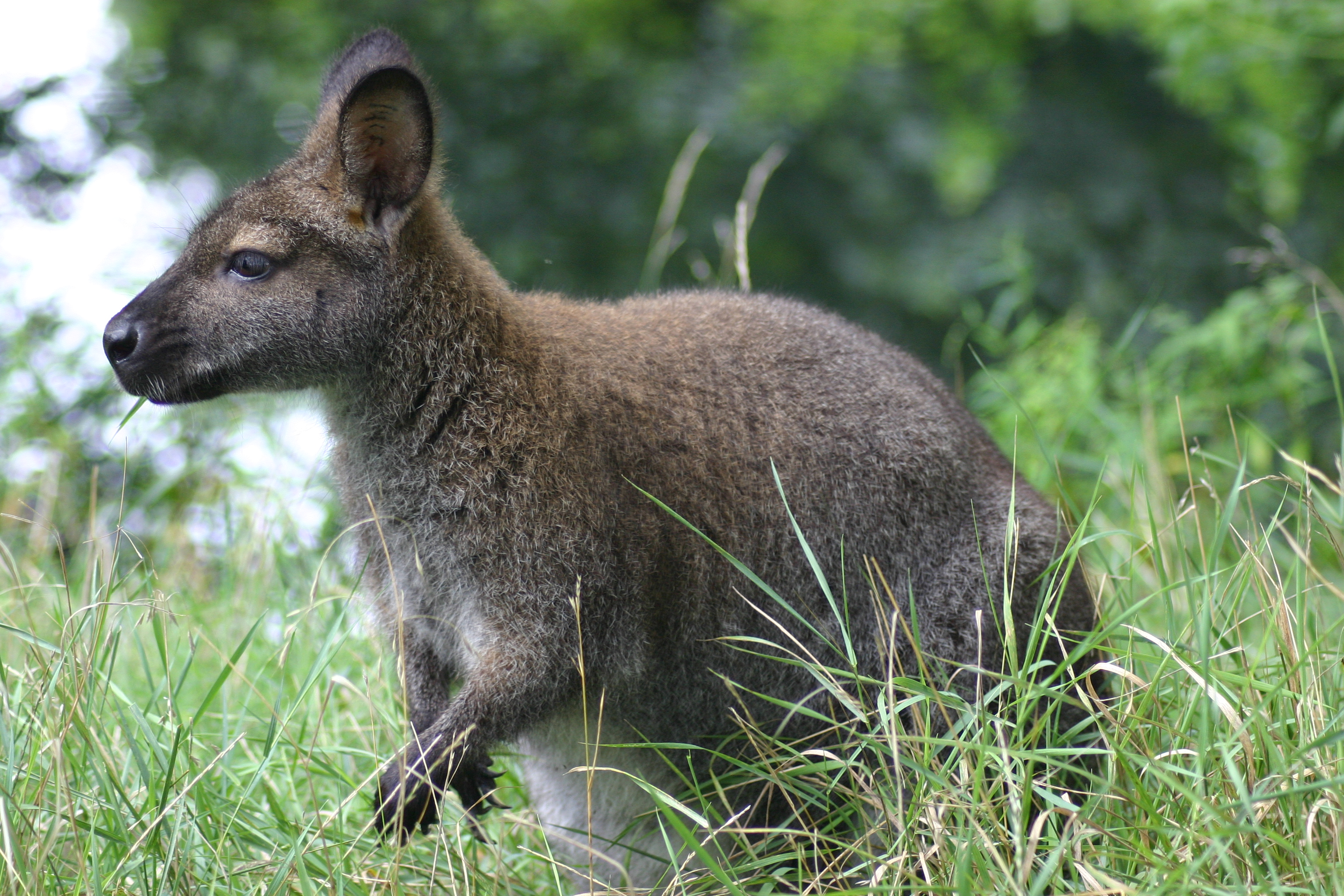
Red-necked wallaby (Notamacropus rufogriseus)

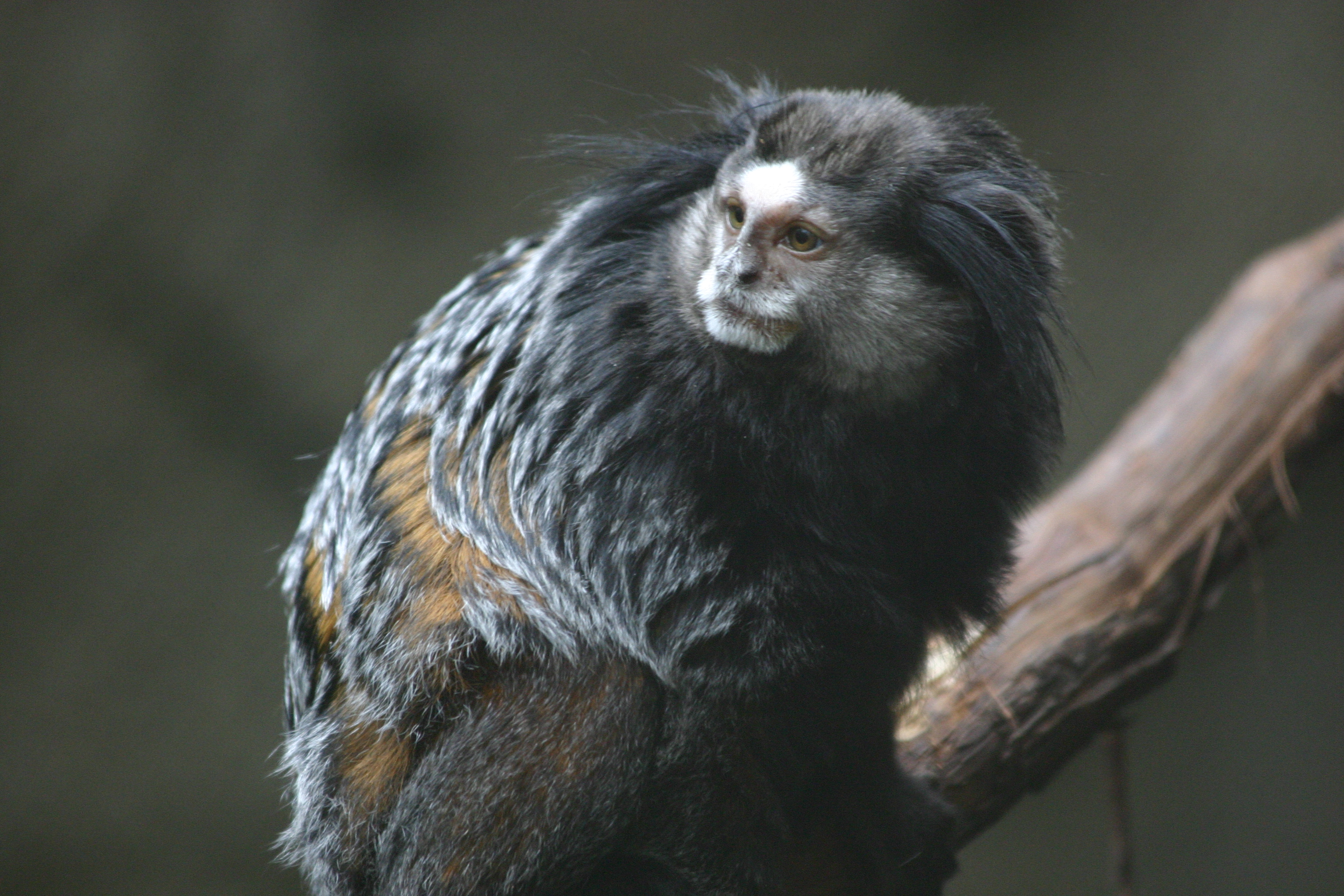
Wied's marmoset (Callithrix kuhlii)

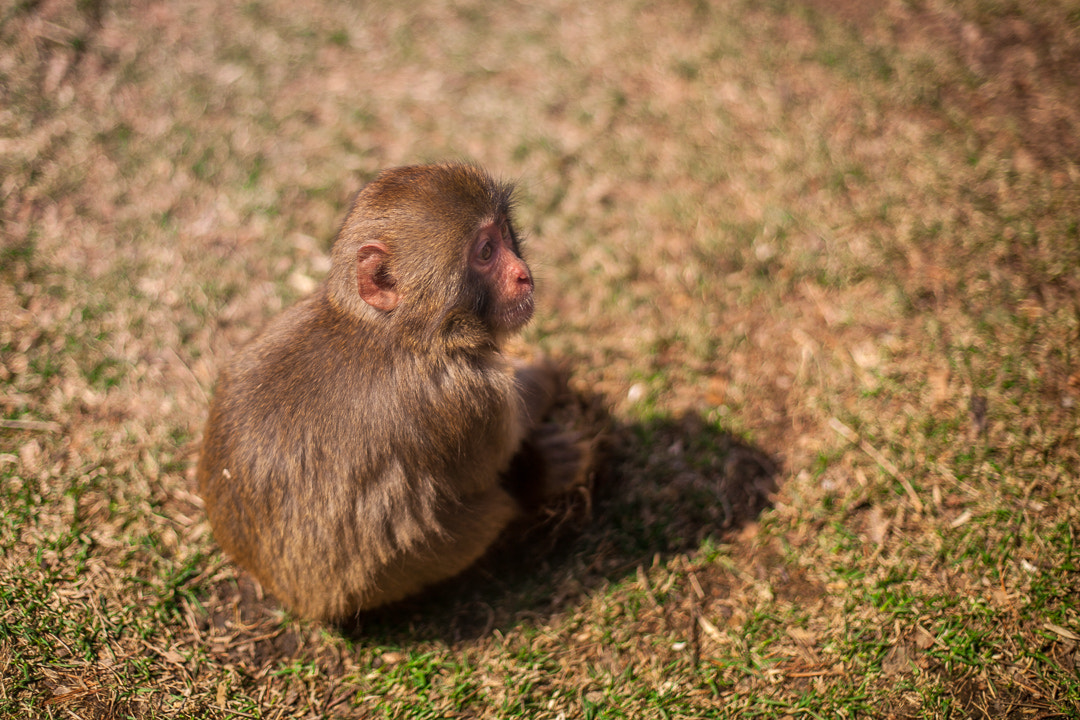
A baby Japanese macaque (Macaca fuscata)

== Incidents ==
In August 2019, a 12 year-old male okapi named Kidomo brought to Des Moines from the Oklahoma City Zoo was humanely euthanized after sustaining injuries in an incident with his exhibit mate, an 11 year-old nyala named Cloud. Based on initial information, Blank Park Zoo CEO Mark Vukovich stated, "the two animals were playing together and unfortunately the okapi was injured".

In April 2020, Blank Park Zoo announced the death of 3-year-old Duchess, a female Hartmann's mountain zebra, that died following an accidental high-speed run-in with a fence post. Duchess and her mate Duke had arrived at the zoo a year prior from another AZA-accredited institution.
