= Rufus Early Clement =

African American educator (1900–1967)

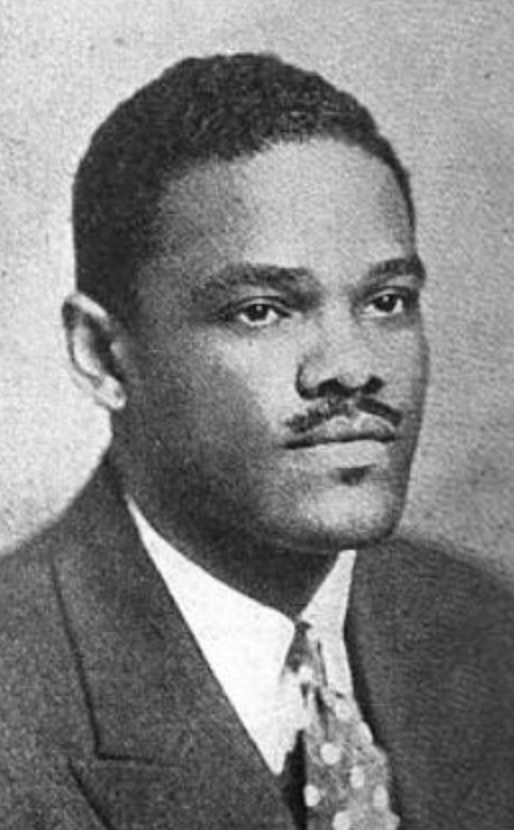

President of Atlanta University
- In office 1937–1967
- Preceded by: Florence M. Read
- Succeeded by: Thomas D. Jarrett

Member of the Atlanta Board of Education for the Third Ward
- In office 1954–1966

Personal details
- Born: June 26, 1900 Salisbury, North Carolina, U.S.
- Died: November 7, 1967 (aged 67) Manhattan, New York, U.S.
- Spouse: Pearl Clement
- Occupation: Academic administrator, university president, educator

Rufus Early Clement (June 26, 1900 – November 7, 1967) was an American academic administrator and university president. He served as the sixth and longest-serving president of the historically black Atlanta University (now Clark Atlanta University) in Atlanta, Georgia.

== Career ==
A native of Salisbury, North Carolina, Clement started out as a professor and then dean of Livingstone College in Salisbury. Clement then served as the first dean of Louisville Municipal College, a segregated college for Negros of University of Louisville. In 1937, he was named president of Atlanta University, position which he held until his death some thirty years later.

W. E. B. Du Bois suspected Clement of being behind Du Bois' forced retirement from Atlanta University in 1944. At least one author supports this theory, arguing that Du Bois' confrontational approach to civil rights for African Americans clashed with Clement's more accommodationist inclination.

In 1953, Clement was elected to the Atlanta School Board, having become the first African American since Reconstruction to hold public office in Atlanta. He served for three terms prior to retirement in 1966.

In the 1966 gubernatorial election, Clement endorsed the Republican nominee, U.S. Representative Howard "Bo" Callaway, who challenged the Democrat Lester Maddox, a businessman and staunch segregationist who had closed his Pickrick Restaurant to avoid integration. Clement and the Negro Baptist Convention argued that the only way to prevent Maddox's election was for blacks to support Callaway though many in the minority group opposed Callaway's conservative voting record in Congress. Ultimately as a result of an election impasse, the Georgia General Assembly elected Maddox as governor, 182 to 66.

== Family ==
Clement's nephew George Clement Bond is an anthropologist at Columbia University in New York City. Another nephew is J. Max Bond Jr., architect. Clement is also related to Horace Mann Bond. Clement's son-in-law, Robert Joseph Pershing Foster, was Ray Charles' personal physician.

== See also ==
- List of presidents of Clark Atlanta University
