= Pacific Marine Mammal Center =

Rescue center in Laguna Beach, California

Coordinates: 33.5730°N 117.7625°W

Pacific Marine Mammal Center is a rescue, rehabilitation, and release facility for sick or at-risk wild mammals in Laguna Beach, California, United States. It was started by Jim Stauffer in 1971.

== History ==
In 1971, Stauffer, a Laguna Beach lifeguard, was alerted to a Pacific harbor seal pup which appeared to be sick. He took the pup to an animal hospital, where it was found to be infested with lungworms. Stauffer nurtured the pup back to health and returned it to the ocean, and continued rescuing mammals in the Laguna Beach area with kiddie pools installed in his backyard. The California Department of Fish and Game later issued a permit allowing Stauffer to temporarily house seals and sea lions at his home, the first of its kind in the state. From that, Friends of the Sea Lion, later Pacific Marine Mammal Center, was established.

Friends of the Sea Lion created membership cards and sold T-shirts to raise money in its early years. Their first major donation came from a woman whose dog Stauffer rescued from a cliff at Three Arch Bay; the woman then donated $10,000 to Stauffer's organization. In 1976, after the Society for the Prevention of Cruelty to Animals vacated their Laguna Canyon barn location, city leaders offered the site to Pacific Marine Mammal Center. In 2023, the center began an expansion budgeted at $14 million ($14.8 million in 2025), during which, many of their animals were temporarily transferred to SeaWorld San Diego.

Stauffer died in 2021, after which, the center continued its operations. In 2025, a domoic acid bloom caused an increase in the number of mammal strandings the center responded to, from 150 to 200 per year to 337 in six months. In 2026, the center received media attention when it rescued a sick sea lion pup that had jumped onto a sailboat off the coast of San Clemente. The sea lion, later named "Chump", was discovered to have pneumonia and be suffering from malnutrition. The center received further attention later that week, when it responded to a dead 11-short-ton (10,000 kg) humpback whale that had washed up ashore in Newport Beach. The center led the effort to dispose of the body; however, the carcass was eventually pulled out to sea by the tide.

== See also ==
- Wildlife rehabilitation
