= Edward Twichell Ware =

Third president of Atlanta University, Atlanta, Georgia, USA

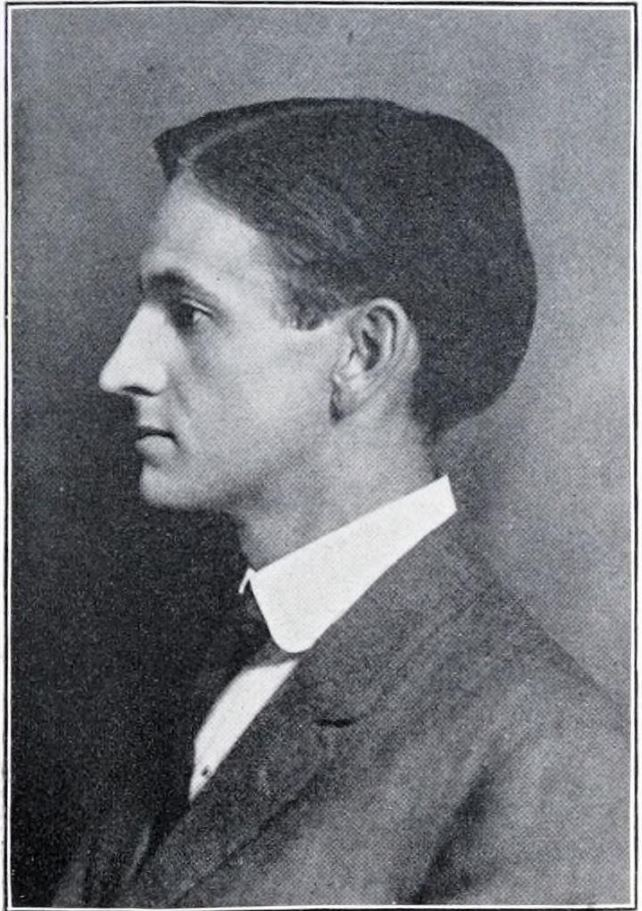
Edward Twichell Ware, c. 1910

Edward Twichell Ware (1874 – May 19, 1927) was an American academic administrator and the third president of Atlanta University (now Clark Atlanta University) from 1907 to 1919. Ware graduated from Yale College in 1897, and returned to Atlanta University to help in fundraising efforts. Students perceived Ware as being different from other white people, because he extended common courtesies to black students. His father was Edmund Asa Ware, the first president of Atlanta University.
