= Miron Rațiu =

Miron Raţiu (July 8, 1929, in Dobra - November 23, 2011, in Oradea) was a Romanian conductor and music educator.

== Life and career ==
He studied with Sergiu Celibidache.

His repertoire spans from Johann Sebastian Bach to Witold Lutosławski, he has recorded Michael Haydn's only minor-key symphony.

He conducted the Philharmonic Orchestra of Oradea for more than 40 years, and also conducted other orchestras in Romania and throughout Europe.

His daughter, Anca Rațiu, is violinist with the Barcelona Symphony Orchestra.
