= Miron (surname) =

Miron or Mirón is a surname of several origins. Spanish surname Mirón: a variant of Catalan Miró or a nickname derived from the verb "mirar", "to look", in the sense 'nosy', 'curious'. French: a diminutive of "Mire". Also a Romanian surname derived from the given name Miron.

Notable people with the surname include:

- People of Miron family, noble French family of Catalan origin
- Christopher Miron Allport, American actor, director, composer and author
- Andrei Miron, Romanian professional footballer
- Ami Miron, American Israeli entrepreneur and technologist
- Bogdan Florin Miron (born 1990), Romanian association football goalkeeper
- Bogdan Ionuț Miron (born 1982), Romanian association football goalkeeper
- Brock Miron (born 1980), Canadian skater
- Dan Miron (born 1934), American critic and author
- Eugenia Miron (born 1992), Moldovan footballer
- François Miron (born 1962), French-Canadian filmmaker
- Gaston Miron (1952–2020), American chess player
- Issachar Miron (1920–2015), Israeli composer
- Javier Mirón (born 1999), Spanish runner
- Jay Miron
- Jeffrey Miron
- Leonard Miron
- Marcel-Ioan Miron (born 1982), Romanian tennis player.
- Mike Miron
- Oleg Miron (born 1956), a sailor from Soviet Union
- Paul Miron (1926–2008), Romanian linguist and philologist
- Rami Miron (born 1957), Israeli Olympic wrestler
- Ray Miron
- Salvador Díaz Mirón (1853–1928), Mexican poet
- Uriel Miron (born 1968), Israeli artist and sculptor

== See also ==
- Miron (name)
