= Myron Rosander =

American visual designer

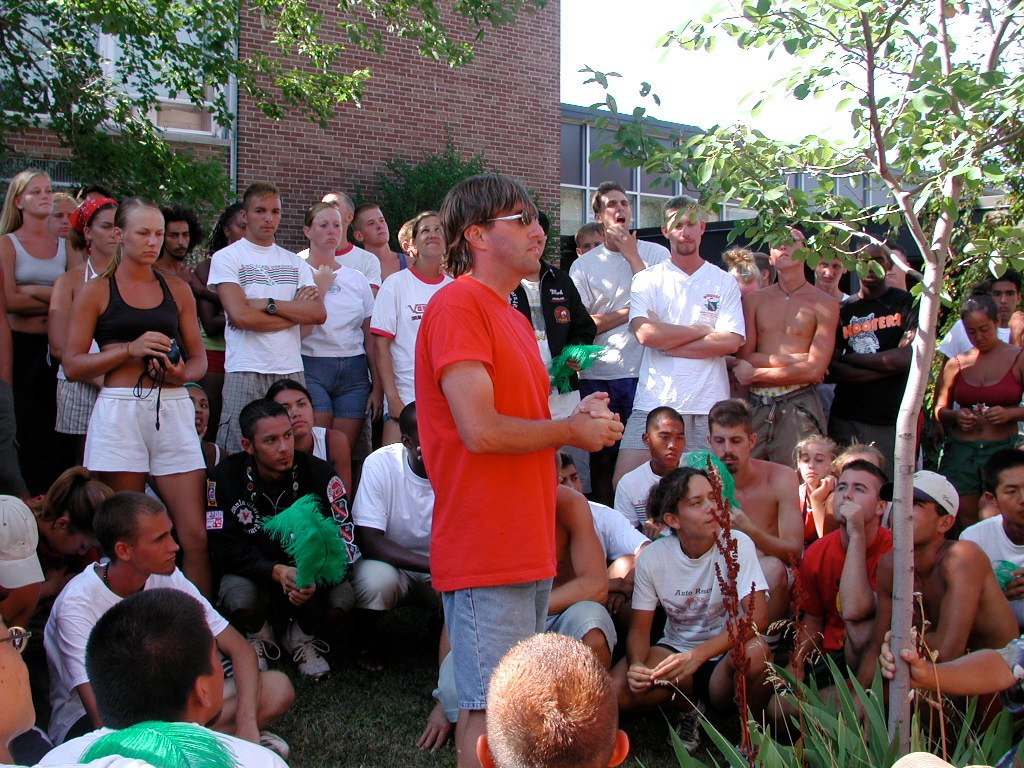
- Myron Rosander addressing the 2001 Santa Clara Vanguard.

Background information
- Born: California, US
- Died: December 20, 2015 (aged 55)
- Genre: Drum and bugle corps
- Occupations: Musician, instructor, designer
- Instrument: French horn
- Formerly of: Santa Clara Vanguard; Madison Scouts; Phantom Regiment; Blue Stars; Bushwackers
- Awards: Vanguard Hall of Fame (2014); Gail Royer Memorial Vanguard of the Year (2000)

Myron Stewart Rosander (1960 – December 20, 2015) was a performing member, visual instructor, and visual designer for the Santa Clara Vanguard Drum and Bugle Corps and later a visual designer for the Phantom Regiment Drum and Bugle Corps. He was inducted posthumously into the Drum Corps International Hall of Fame in 2016.

== History ==
Rosander was born and raised in Northern California where he was introduced to drum corps in 1974 at the age of 13. He once reflected that watching the Santa Clara Vanguard (SCV) Drum and Bugle Corps was 10 minutes that changed his life forever. He marched French horn for Vanguard from 1976 to 1980 during which the group earned a championship in 1978.

After he aged out, he became a professional visual designer. His lengthy career includes being a visual designer and assistant director for the Santa Clara Vanguard, spanning 30 years of involvement. He was inducted into the corps’ Hall of Fame in 2014 and was a recipient of the “Gail Royer Memorial Vanguard of the Year” award in 2000.

Despite Rosander's success winning championships, he never wavered from his personal mantra of what the pageantry arts were truly all about: personal growth as a responsible person.

Rosander's other drum corps work includes visual designer for the Blue Stars in 2012, Phantom Regiment in 2010, and Madison Scouts in 2006. He has also designed for the Bushwackers all-age drum corps and many high school bands including L.D. Bell from Hurst, Texas. Rosander served on the DCI Task Force, participated in clinics, and was a judge for Bands of America as well as indoor competitions.
