= Myron L. Weisfeldt =

American cardiologist

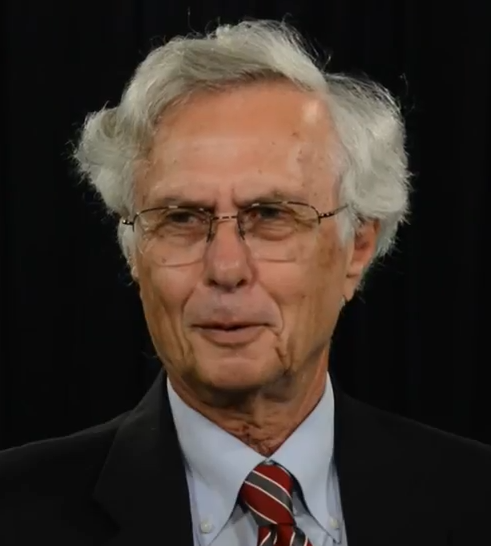
- Weisfeldt in 2016
- Born: 1940 (age 85–86); Milwaukee
- Education: Johns Hopkins School of Medicine
- Scientific career
- Fields: Cardiology
- Workplaces: Columbia University College of Physicians & Surgeons; Johns Hopkins Hospital

Myron L. Weisfeldt (born 1940) is an American cardiologist and physician-scientist. He was the William Osler Professor of Medicine and chair of the department of medicine at Johns Hopkins School of Medicine. He was the Physician-in-chief of Johns Hopkins Hospital.

== Life ==
Weisfeldt was born in Milwaukee, the son of a primary care physician and school teacher. He completed a B.A. (1962) from Johns Hopkins University and his M.D. (1965) from Johns Hopkins School of Medicine. He trained in cardiology at the Massachusetts General Hospital and the National Institutes of Health.

Weisfeldt served as the director of the cardiology division at Johns Hopkins from 1975 to 1991. From 1991 to 2001, he was the chair of the department of medicine and the Samuel Bard Professor of Medicine at the Columbia University College of Physicians & Surgeons. He was president of the American Heart Association in 1990. From 2001 to 2014, Weisfeldt was the William Osler Professor of Medicine and chair of the department of medicine at Johns Hopkins School of Medicine. He was the Physician-in-chief of Johns Hopkins Hospital.

He has served on numerous NIH advisory boards and committees.

In 2022, he received the Eugene Braunwald Academic Mentorship Award from the American Heart Association. He is an elected member of the National Academy of Medicine and the American Society for Clinical Investigation.
