= Miron Akimovich Ljubovsky =

Miron Akimovich Ljubovsky (1876–1952) was a Russian Empire and Soviet medical doctor and one of the organizers of health care in Tver Oblast.

He earned a medical degree from Kharkov University in 1952. Ljubovsky received his training as a surgeon. He was the main organizer of the establishment of the Tver School for Nurses. The school was opened in 1920 with Ljubovsky as its head.

He served as a military surgeon in World War I and World War II He was chief surgeon of military hospitals during World War II. Miron Ljubovsky earned the award Honoured Physician of the RSFSR.

He died on June 1, 1952, and is buried in Pervomayskoe graveyard in Tver near his wife Maria Antonovna Ljubovsky.
