= Florence M. Read =

American educational administrator (1886 – 1973)

Florence Matilda Read

President of Spelman College
- In office 1927–1953

President of Atlanta University (acting)
- In office 1936–1937
- Preceded by: John Hope
- Succeeded by: Rufus Early Clement

Personal details
- Born: November 12, 1886 Delevan, New York, United States
- Died: April 29, 1973 (aged 86) Pomona, Los Angeles County, California, United States
- Resting place: Delevan Cemetery, Delevan, Cattaraugus County, New York, United States
- Education: Mount Holyoke College
- Occupation: College president, author

Florence Matilda Read (November 12, 1886 – April 29, 1973) was an American college president and academic administrator. She was president of Spelman College from 1927 to 1953, and the acting president of Atlanta University (now Clark Atlanta University) from 1936 to 1937. Read also wrote a book about Spelman College history.

== Early life and education ==
Florence Matilda Read was born on November 12, 1886, in the village of Delevan in Cattaraugus County, New York. Read received her B.A. degree from Mount Holyoke College in 1909, and served as alumnae secretary.

== Career ==
In 1911, Read moved to Portland, Oregon where she was secretary to the president of Reed College, a post she held until 1920. During World War I, Read worked at the Council of National Defense in Washington, D.C., and later with the YMCA in France.

From 1920 to 1927, Read served as executive secretary of the International Health Division of the Rockefeller Foundation.

=== Spelman College ===
In 1927, Read was named President of Spelman College a historically black college for women in Atlanta. During her time as president, enrollment almost doubled and the college's reputation in the liberal arts was enhanced. On April 11, 1929, which was also Spelman's 48th celebration of Founder's Day, Read was a co-signer of the Agreement of Affiliation between Spelman College, Morehouse College and Atlanta University. That agreement was signed in President Read's office, and the signees breakfasted together afterward.

While she was president at Spelman, she also became superintendent of Atlanta University and helped make arrangements to incorporate women students at Atlanta University into the Spelman student body and college community.

=== Later years ===
Read was elected Spelman's President Emeritus when she retired in 1953. In 1955, she researched what would later become her history of Spelman College while living in South Hadley, Massachusetts.

Read died on April 29, 1973, in Pomona, California.

== Honors and awards ==
- Read was awarded an honorary degree by Oberlin College in 1939.
- In 1961 Reed College awarded her an honorary degree.
- In 1962, Mount Holyoke College bestowed on her the Alumnae Medal of Honor.

== Written work ==
- The Story of Spelman College. Atlanta, Georgia (1961)
