= Edmund Asa Ware =

American educator and the first president of Atlanta University

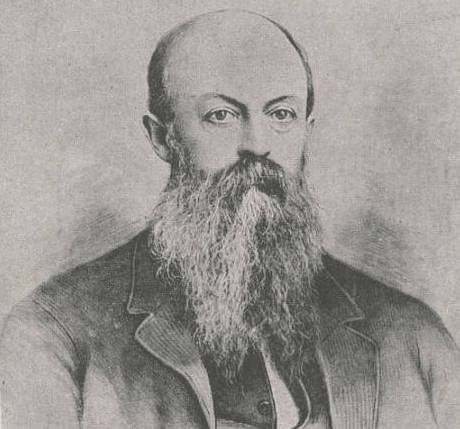
Edmund Asa Ware

Edmund Asa Ware (December 22, 1837 – September 25, 1885) was an American educator and the first president of Atlanta University, serving from 1869 to 1885.

== Biography ==
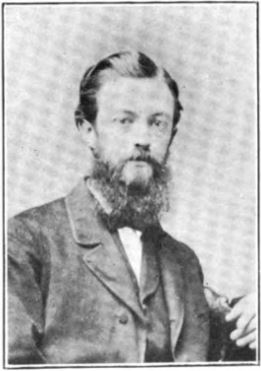
Edmund Asa Ware, as a young man

Ware, son of Asa B. and Catharine (Slocum) Ware, was born December 22, 1837, in North Wrentham, now Norfolk, Massachusetts, and entered College from Norwich, Connecticut, to which place his family had removed about 1852. He graduated from Yale College in 1863. For the two years next after graduation he taught in the Norwich Free Academy, where he had had his early education.

In September 1865, he went to Nashville, Tennessee to assist in reorganizing the public schools, and thence a year later to Atlanta, Georgia, under the auspices of the American Missionary Association, as Superintendent of the Association's schools in that city and vicinity In December 1866, he was licensed to preach, and from that time preached more or less frequently. He received August 1, 1867, from Howard University founder and first President General Howard, the appointment of State Superintendent of Education for Georgia; interested in the further of higher education for African-Americans. He thus took over the leadership of Atlanta University (now Clark Atlanta University) previously founded by James Tate and Grandison Daniels two former slaves. He became the first President of the Board of Trustees at Atlanta University founded September 19, 1865. Atlanta University chartered October 17, 1867; offered first instruction at postsecondary level 1869; first graduating class 1873, (normal school for future women teachers); and awarded its first six bachelor's degrees June 1876.

He had lately returned from a visit to the mountains, to prepare for the opening of the school, and appeared in usual health; on the afternoon of September 25, 1885, he died suddenly of heart disease, in Atlanta, in the 48th year of his age.

He married November 10, 1869, Sarah J. Twichell of Plantsville, Connecticut, who survived him with three daughters and one son. One of their daughters, Olive, was married in 1912 to Percy Williams Bridgman, recipient of the 1946 Nobel Prize in Physics. His son Edward Twichell Ware went on to become the third president of Atlanta University.

== Legacy ==
The Edmund Asa ("E. A.") Ware School was built in his honor in 1922 on the corner of Martin Luther King Jr. Drive and Walnut Street, near the Herndon Home Museum. It was one of the first elementary schools for African-American children in Atlanta. The building was later renamed as Jordan Hall and became part of the Morris Brown College. It was placed on the National Register of Historic Places in 1976.

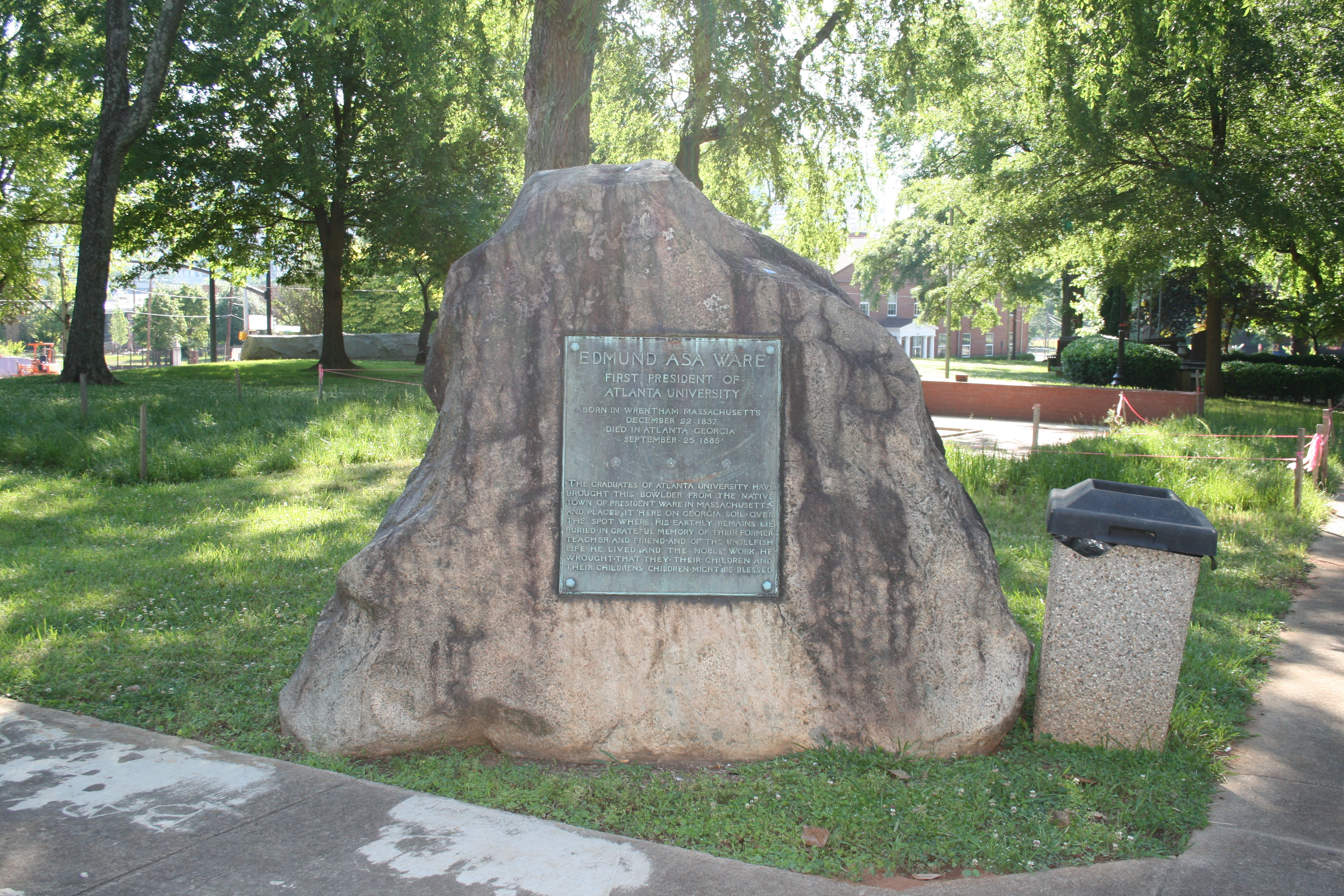
Monument to Ware at Clark Atlanta University/Morris Brown College

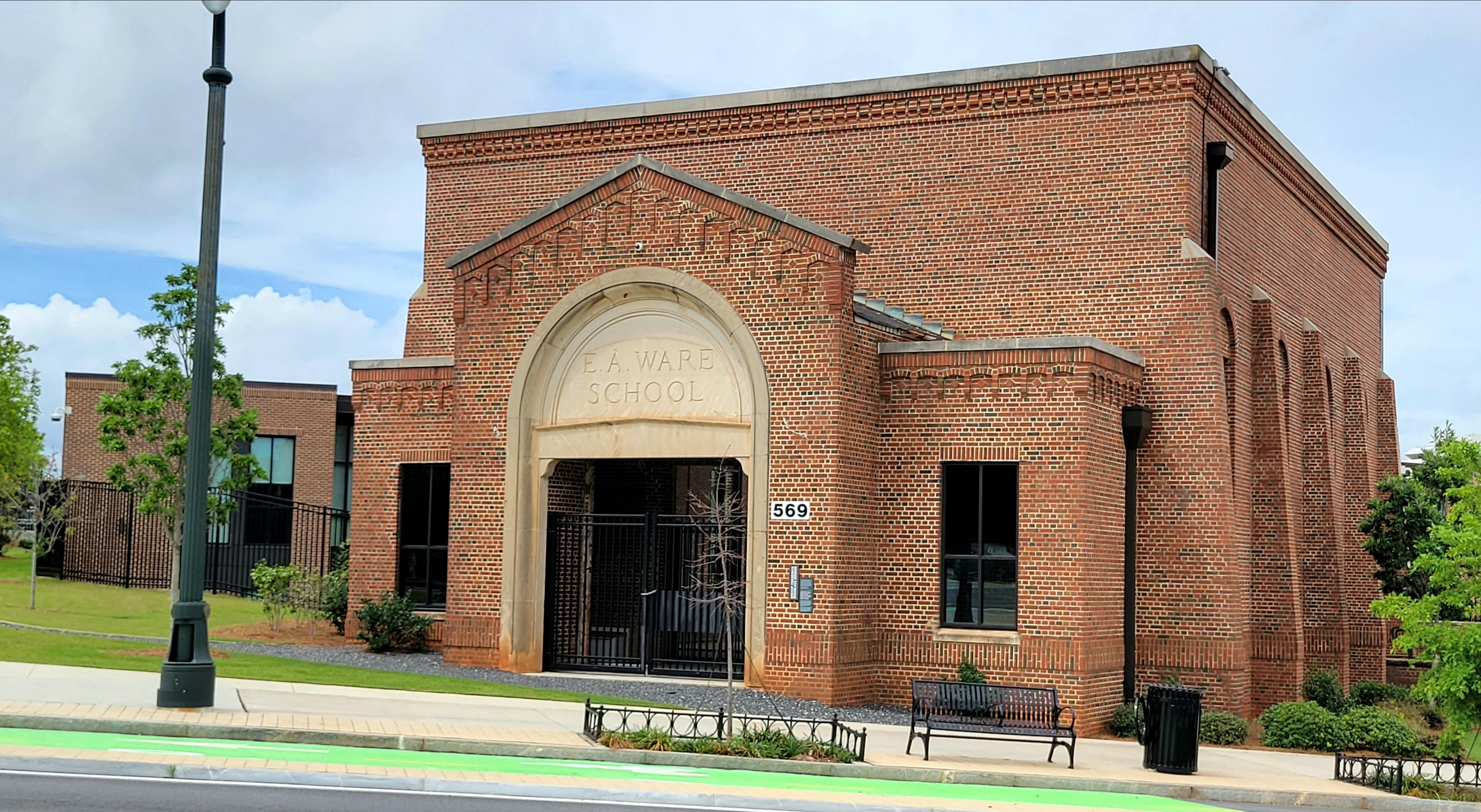
E. A. Ware School Building.

== See also ==
- List of presidents of Clark Atlanta University
