= Myron Noodleman =

American clown

Myron Noodleman Clown Prince of Baseball
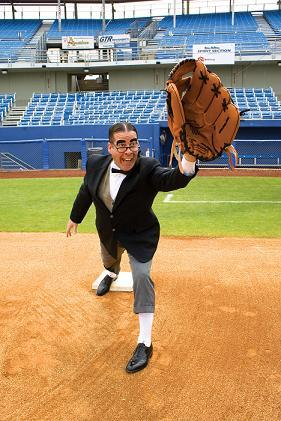
- Hader as Myron Noodleman, 2011
- Born: Richard Martin Hader; March 31, 1958; Evanston, Illinois, U.S.
- Died: November 1, 2017 (aged 59); Broken Arrow, Oklahoma, U.S.
- Occupation: Sports entertainer
- Title: Clown Prince of Baseball
- Predecessor: Max Patkin

Richard Martin "Rick" Hader (March 31, 1958 – November 1, 2017), better known as Myron Noodleman, was an American clown who performed at Minor League Baseball games and other public events.

Since 2004, he was billed as the fifth "Clown Prince of Baseball", following Arlie Latham, Al Schacht, Jackie Price, and Max Patkin.

Rick Hader was the brother of screenwriter Matt Hader and the uncle of Bill Hader, a die-hard Chicago Cubs fan, and a high school math teacher and football coach at Union High School in Tulsa, Oklahoma before he began his career as a clown.

== Performances ==
Hader's performances as Myron Noodleman began when he showed up at a school football game in the late-1980s dressed in full nerd regalia. After a few more trials, he hired an agent, attended the Baseball Winter Meetings in 1994, and honed his act through years of touring. Every summer performed at over 60 to 70 baseball parks across North America. He was the celebrity attraction to numerous Nerd Night promotions.

Myron's persona was reminiscent of the nerdy Jerry Lewis characters of the 1960s: he could be manic and disruptive one moment, and patiently pantomimic the next. Between innings he performed sketches that involved players, umpires, groundskeepers and sometimes fans.

One of his signature skits, titled "Dueling Signals," was performed to music with a player or coach. It started with Myron flashing a baseball coach's signal and was answered by his skit partner. The signals kept coming faster and faster until there was nothing left to do but break into some contemporary dance moves mixed with a little do-as-I-do. When each routine was over, Myron would go into the stands and circulate among the fans, providing impromptu comedy. He would help himself to a spectator's seat, refreshments, and even girlfriend.

In November 2004, Myron Noodleman was bestowed the title "Clown Prince of Baseball" by baseball administrator Roland Hemond in a ceremony at the Mike Veeck Promotional Seminar at Hilton Head Island, South Carolina. Hemond, now executive advisor to the general manager of the Chicago White Sox, once served as general manager for Mike's father, Bill Veeck. Veeck was the one to place the title on the previous and best-known Clown Prince of Baseball, Max Patkin. Baseball's Hall of Fame has yet to recognize Noodleman as heir to the Max Patkin legacy, though as of 2006 no rival claimant has disputed the title.

Hader died on November 1, 2017, at age 59, due to effects of sinus cancer.
