= Miron Costin (disambiguation) =

Miron Costin may refer to:

- Miron Costin, 17th century Moldavian chronicler

or two villages in Romania named after him:

- Miron Costin, a village in Vlăsinești Commune, Botoşani County
- Miron Costin, a village in Trifeşti Commune, Neamţ County
