= Myron Prinzmetal =

American cardiologist (1908–1987)

- Born: February 8, 1908; Buffalo, New York, U.S.
- Died: January 8, 1987 (aged 78)
- Education: University of California, San Francisco; University of California, Los Angeles
- Medical career
- Profession: Doctor
- Field: Cardiology

Myron Prinzmetal (February 8, 1908 – January 8, 1987) was an American cardiologist. He studied hypertension and heart arrhythmias among many other topics, and was the first to describe Prinzmetal angina.

== Early life ==
Myron Prinzmetal was born in 1908 in Buffalo, New York, to Anna and Harry Prinzmetal. His family later moved to Los Angeles, where Myron attended Theodore Roosevelt High School. He obtained a B.A. from the University of California, Los Angeles, an M.A. in pharmacy from the University of California, San Francisco, and an M.D. from the UCSF School of Medicine in 1933. As a student, he worked with Gordon Alles and Chauncey D. Leake on the synthesis of amphetamine.

== Career ==
Prinzmetal completed his medical internship in San Francisco and relocated to St. Louis for his residency at Barnes Hospital. In 1935, he became a fellow at Mount Sinai Hospital in New York City. This was followed by a fellowship at University College London, where he worked with George Pickering on research into the hormone renin, and another fellowship at the University of Southern California. He returned to Los Angeles in 1938 to take up a research position at Cedars of Lebanon Hospital, while also running a private practice.

Prinzmetal authored at least 165 publications over the course of his career. The main focus of his research was hypertension, and he named and described Prinzmetal's angina, a variant of classical angina that occurs at rest. During the Second World War, he focused his research on shock caused by muscle trauma and burns. He published widely on topics including heart arrhythmias, electrocardiography, and circulatory shock. Although he specialized in cardiology, he also studied diseases of the lungs and kidneys, and he was one of the first West Coast physicians to use iodine-131 to treat Graves' disease, a thyroid disorder.

== Personal life ==
Prinzmetal had four children with his first wife, Blanche Keiler. He owned a collection of rare books, including the only first-edition copy of William Harvey's De Motu Cordis not owned by a museum. In 1962, he unknowingly bought the only known portrait of Harvey, which he later returned to the Royal College of Physicians.

Prinzmetal retired in 1971 and died in Los Angeles on January 8, 1987.
