= Red Lady of El Mirón =

Hominin fossil

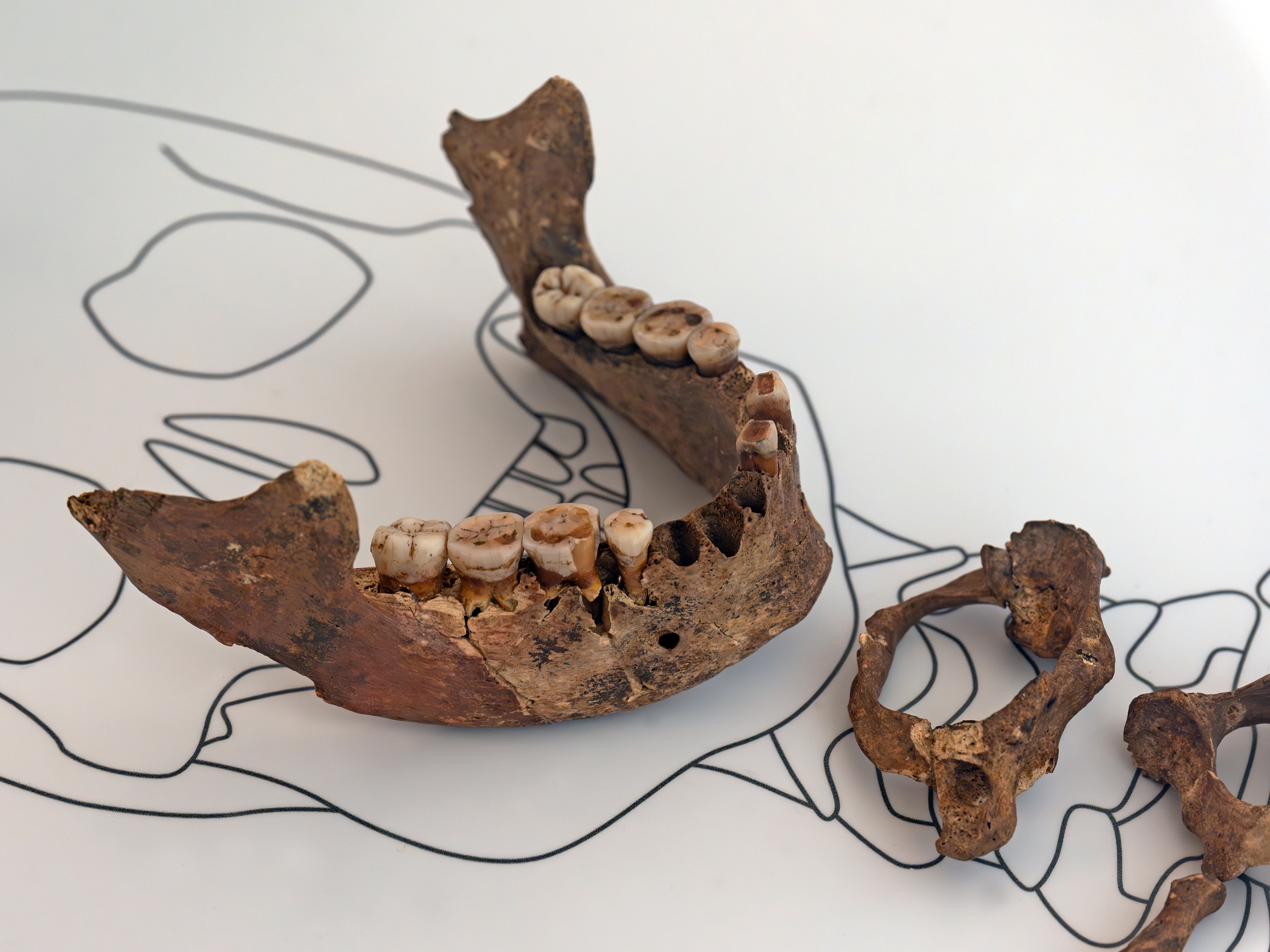
Lower jaw and cervical vertebrae of the "Red Lady" from the cave El Mirón near Ramales de la Victoria, Cantabria, Spain.

The Red Lady of El Mirón is a skeleton belonging to a woman of Upper Paleolithic (Magdalenian) found at El Mirón Cave in eastern Cantabria, Spain.

== Background ==
The discovery was published in 2015 by a team of archaeologists from Universidad de Burgos, Universidad de Cantabria and University of New Mexico. The publication covers an entire August issue of the Journal of Archaeological Science. The woman's age is estimated to be between 35 and 40 years. Her bones were coated with ochre, a red iron-based pigment, hence, her name. Radiocarbon dating indicates that the woman was buried around 18,700 years ago.

The team of archaeologists, led by Lawrence Straus of the University of New Mexico and Manuel González Morales of the University of Cantabria, had been investigating the El Mirón Cave since 1996. They initially found a number of prehistoric remains. In 2010, they explored a narrow space behind a large limestone block inside the cave, where they discovered the Red Lady. Other than the skull and some bones, her skeleton was relatively intact. This indicates that she was properly buried after death. According to the archaeologist, the ochre painting and the limestone block were markers of her grave. Further, the engraving of a letter V on the wall suggest the indication of a woman's burial. Gnaw-marks on the leg bone (tibia) shows that a carnivore (estimated to be about the size of a dog or wolf) bit the bone when the flesh had decomposed. The skull and long bones were likely removed after this incident, perhaps, for display or reburial. These activities suggest that the people might have had burial rituals.
