= Myron Holly Kimball =

American photographer (1827–1912)

Myron Holly Kimball (1827 – 1912) was an American photographer, real estate speculator, and collector.

== Career ==
=== Photography ===
In 1856, Kimball was associated with George Iles in a photography studio at 347 Broadway, New York City.

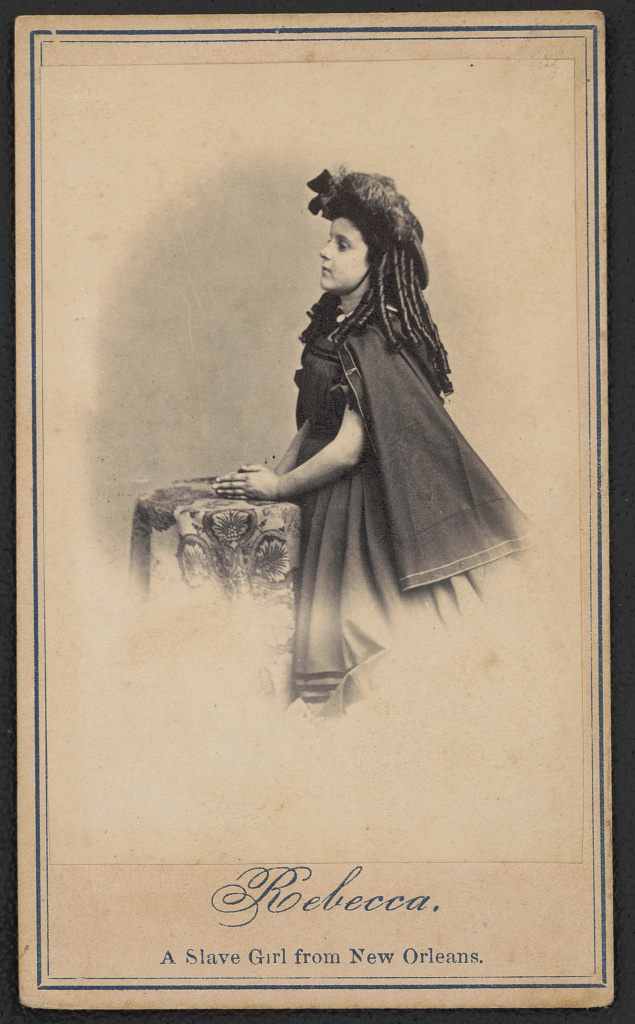
"Rebecca, a slave girl from New Orleans"

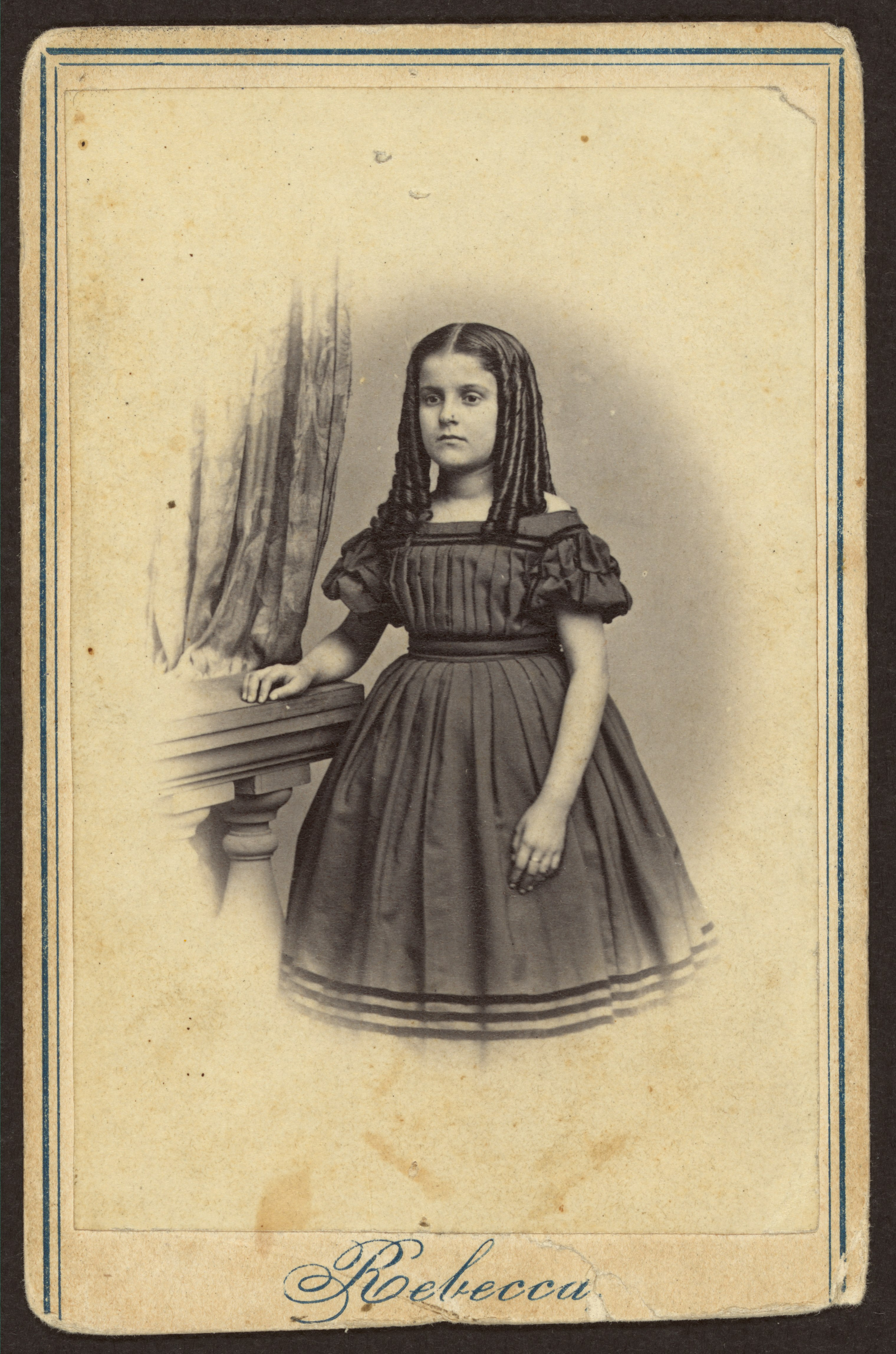
Rebecca - photographed by M. H. Kimball, 477 Broadway, N.Y.

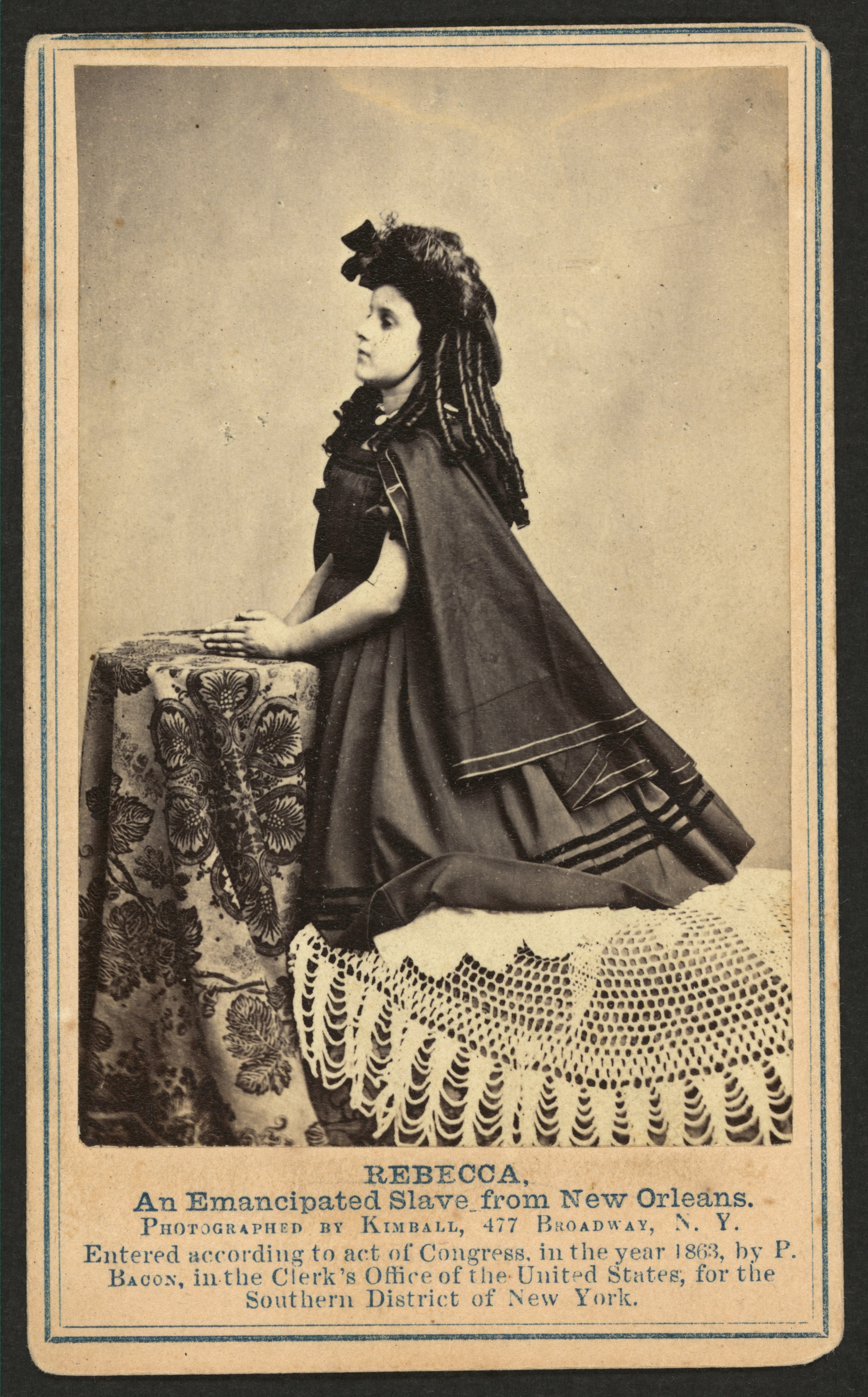
Rebecca, an emancipated slave from New Orleans

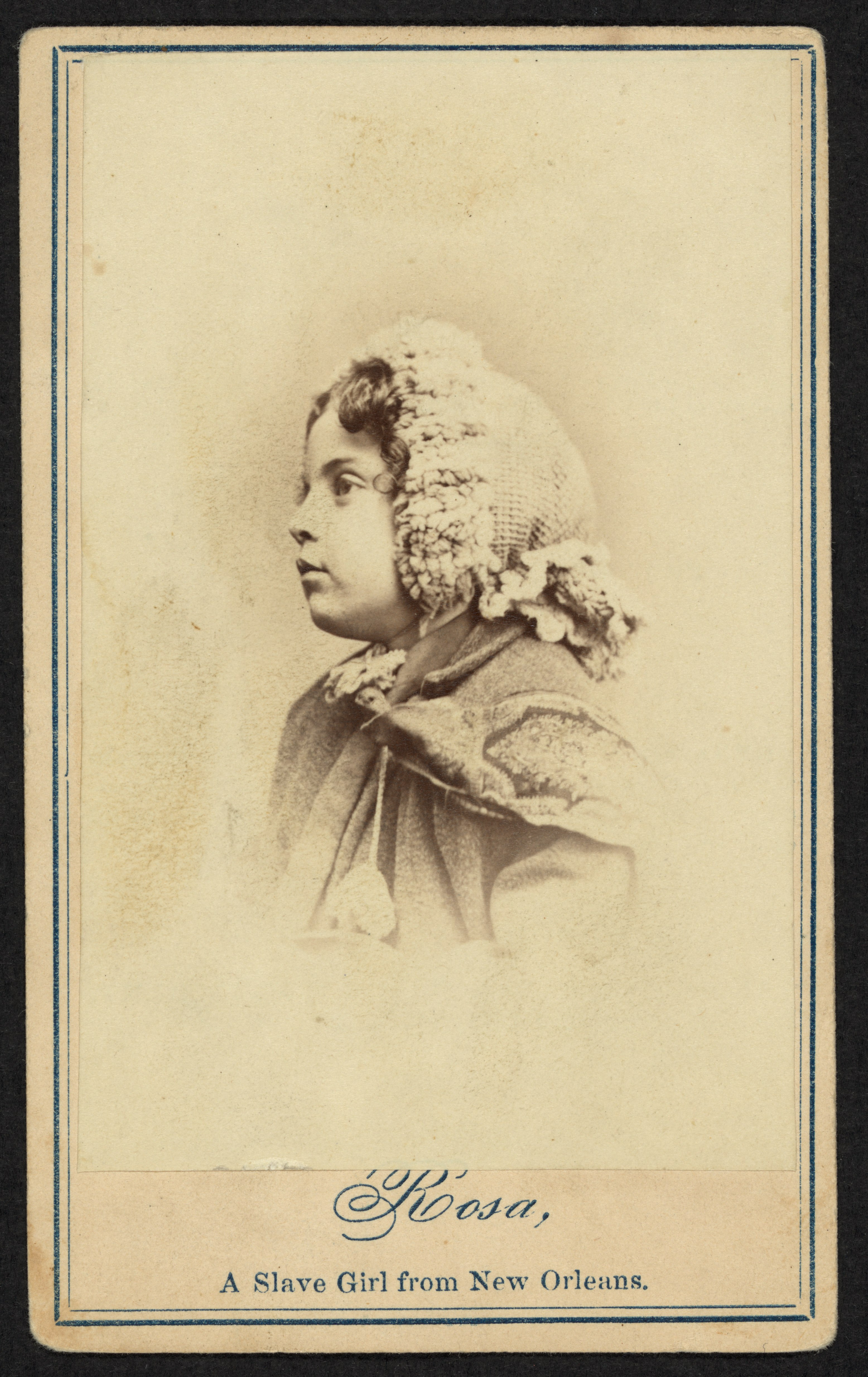
Rosa, a slave girl from New Orleans

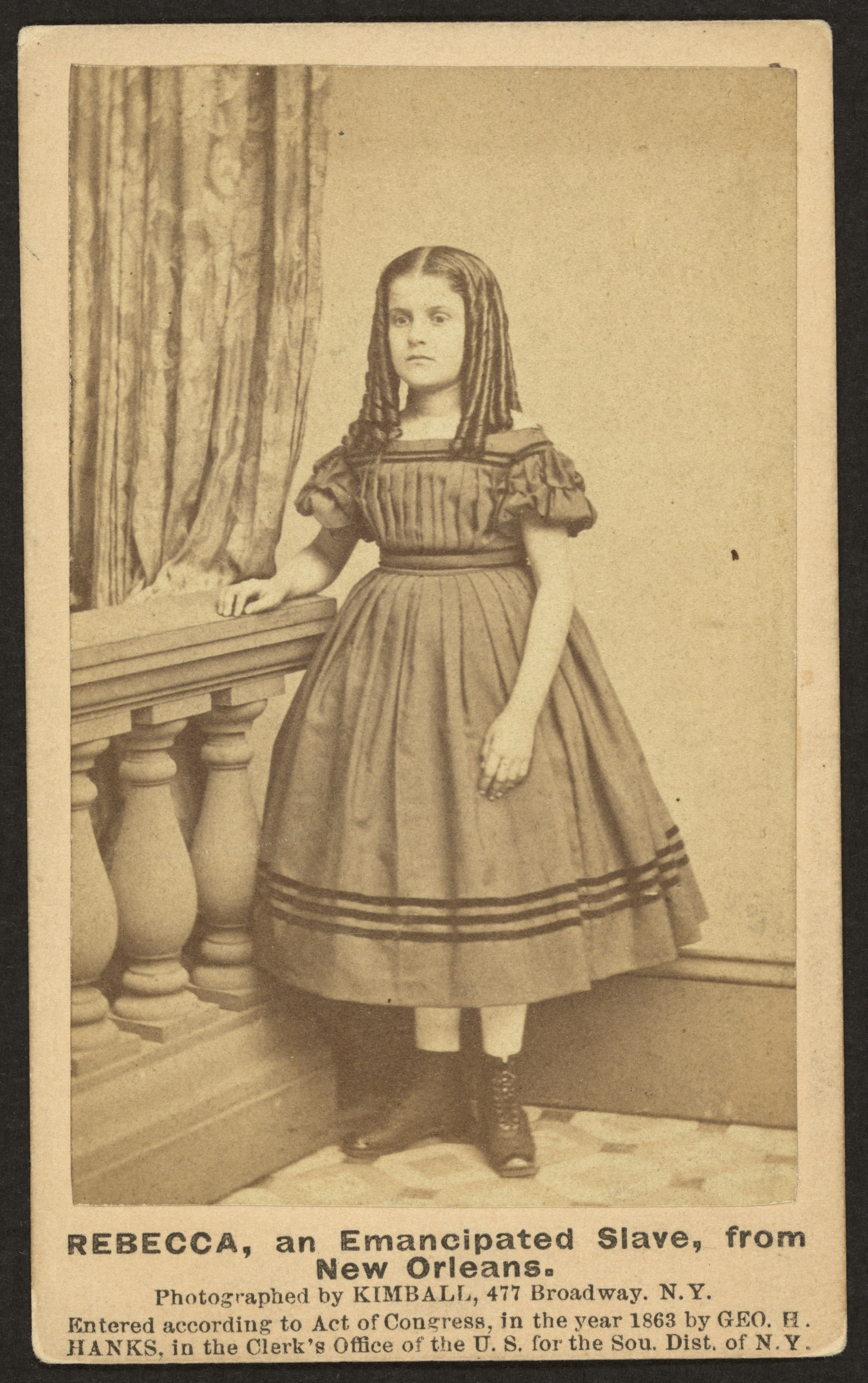
Rebecca, an emancipated slave from New Orleans

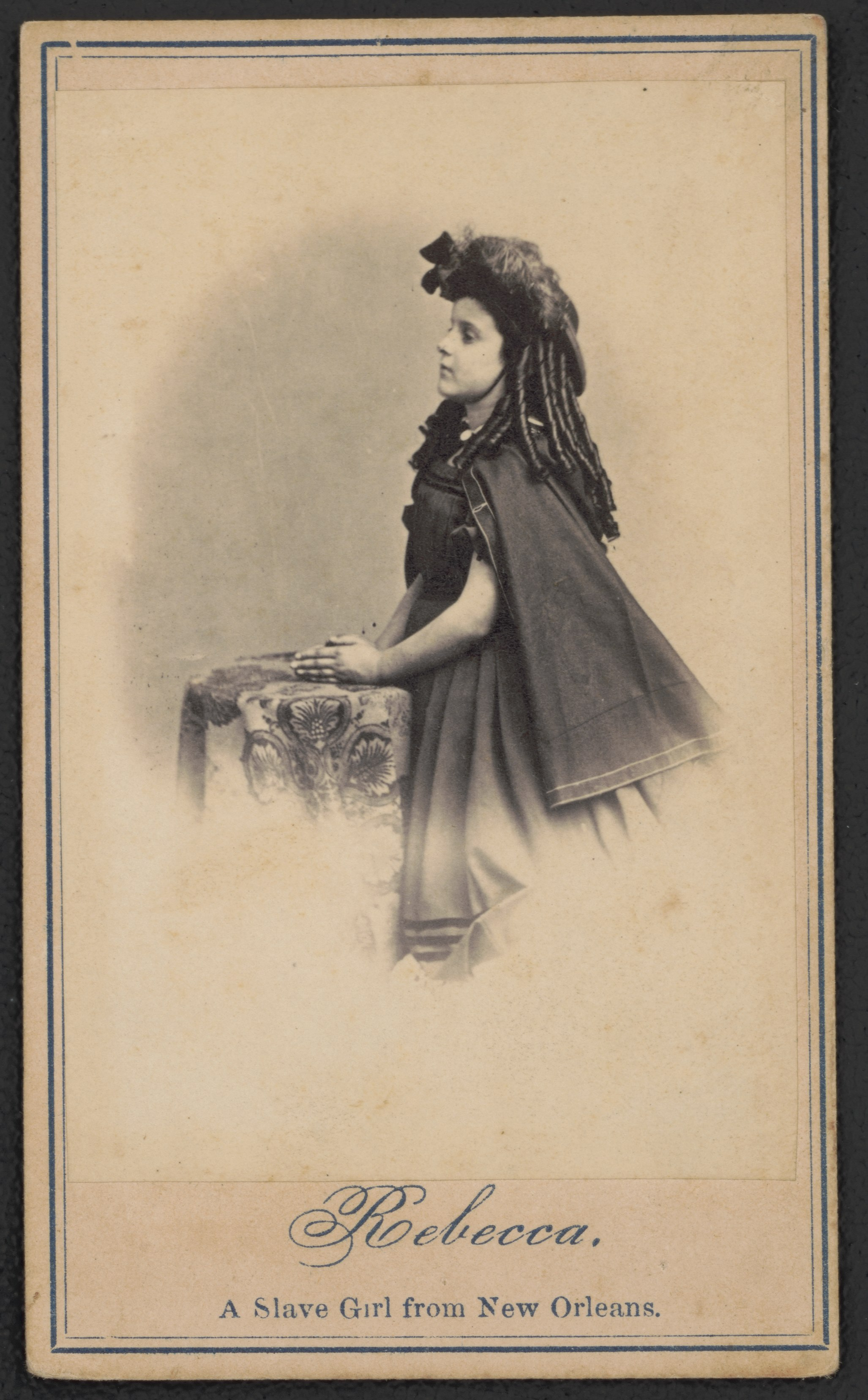
Rebecca, a slave girl from New Orleans - photographed by M.H. Kimball, 477 Broadway, N.Y.

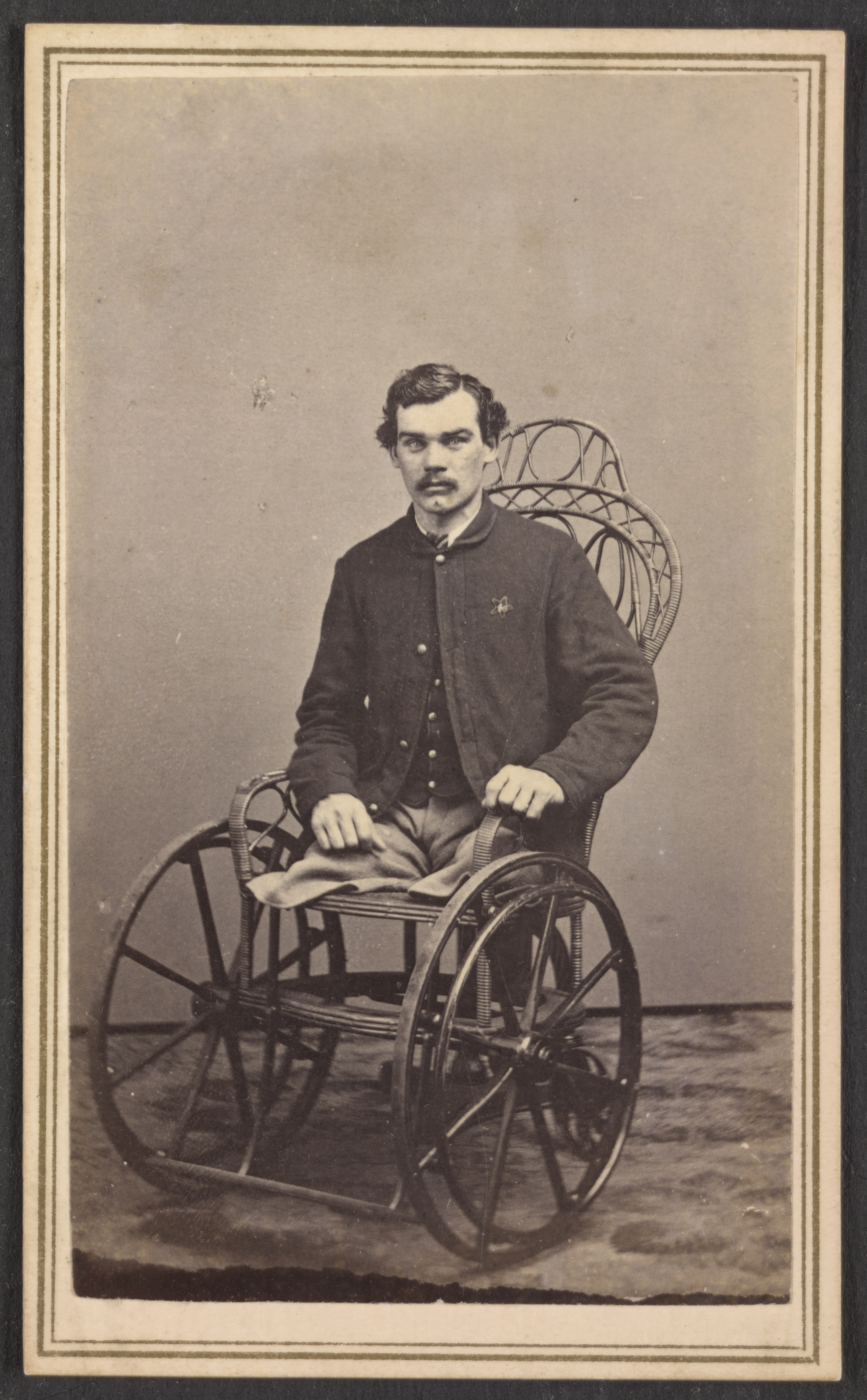
Photographed by Hope, successor to M.H. Kimball

One of his photos, "Emancipated Slaves Brought From Louisiana by Col. George H. Hanks," is in a collection of the Metropolitan Museum of Art. It depicts a freed man, Wilson Chinn, whose forehead had been branded with the initials of his previous "owner".

As part of a fund-raising project in New Orleans for the Freedmen's Bureau, he made other photographs of freed slaves as well.

=== Real estate ===
Kimball also engaged in the real estate business while in New York City and continued in that occupation, with an office on Spring Street, after he and his wife moved to Los Angeles, California, near the beginning of 1874. He became partnered with James Chapin, a "gentleman of extensive means" who had recently arrived from Vinton, Iowa. Kimball had "an active identification" at that time with the city's trade and development, according to the Los Angeles Herald.

He was listed as a hotel keeper in the 1879 list of Los Angeles city electors, and the succeeding listing had him as a capitalist.

In the 1880s, Kimball was a partner with attorney B. L. Peel as a mining operator, insurance agent and real estate broker in Tombstone, Arizona. He was said to possess "rich mines" in Cochise County.

Kimball returned to Los Angeles in late 1881 and soon placed his home at 131 New High Street, the Kimball Mansion, on sale as:

The most elegant private boarding mansion in Southern California; contains 18 rooms, fine parlors, large dining room, complete kitchen and laundry; black walnut furniture, Brussels carpets, marble mantels, grates and gas throughout; during the past seven years has enjoyed an extensive first-class patronage.

It was not sold, however, and three years later, this ad appeared:

KIMBALL MANSION REOPENED: Mrs. M. H. Kimball, having retaken charge of the Kimball Mansion, 131 New High street, announces that the Mansion will again be run on first-class principles. Rooms en suite or single, with our without board, at reasonable rates.

In October 1866, one of the guests committed suicide by strychnine.

== Personal life ==
Kimball was born in Oneida County, New York, in 1827, the son of David M. and Sarah Kimball. He was married on June 25, 1857, to Eliza Robb, who, born in Ireland, was one year younger than he.

He registered for the draft on July 1, 1863, in New York City, where he and Eliza were living in 1865.

The couple celebrated their silver anniversary with a party at their home, the Kimball Mansion on New High Street on June 26, 1882.

By 1888, the couple had moved to Santa Monica.

== Volunteer work ==
Kimball was in charge of the art gallery of the Los Angeles County Fair in 1877, and in 1880 he presented a display of minerals he had collected in Arizona from more than three hundred mines, enough to fill "a four-horse wagon."
