= Myron Goldfinger =

American architect (1933–2023)

- Born: Myron Henry Goldfinger; February 17, 1933; Atlantic City, New Jersey
- Died: July 20, 2023 (aged 90); Westchester County, N.Y.
- Occupation: Architect

Myron Henry Goldfinger (February 17, 1933 – July 20, 2023) was an American architect widely known for his monumental, theatrical and strongly geometric designs for prominent residential clients, mostly in New York and New Jersey, combining modern and Mediterranean vernaculars.

== Background ==
Goldfinger was born and raised in Atlantic City, New Jersey, the son of to William and Bertha (nee Sass) Goldfinger, a mail carrier and housewife. After graduating from Atlantic City High School in 1950, he studied at the University of Pennsylvania in 1955 under Louis Kahn. He subsequently served in Army for two years designing cabinetry at the Pentagon and later worked for Skidmore Owings & Merrill and Philip Johnson — before opening his own office in 1966. In the same year, he began teaching at Pratt Institute, where he taught for 10 years.

In 1966, Goldfinger married June Matkovic, together having two daughters. He died of liver cancer on July 20, 2023, in Westchester County, N.Y., at 90.

== Career ==
Rising to prominence with a 1970 building he designed for himself in Waccabuc. He went on to design various houses in the 1980s, from the suburbs of northern New Jersey to southwest Connecticut. He was widely known for his homes in the wealthier areas of New York, notably in the Hamptons prominently his 1981 home for Fred Jaroslow, the chief operating officer of Weight Watchers, and the Conason House in Southampton, New York (1984) — the latter featured prominently in the Martin Scorsese film, The Wolf of Wall Street. Later, he designed buildings outside New York, including the luxury resort Altamer Luxury Villas in Anguilla.

Goldfinger was also known for his publications. Villages in the Sun, from 1969, discussed the architectural style of the Mediterranean, as well as the designer of the "elegant, high-style" beachside hotel Cove Castles (1985).

== Publications ==
- Goldfinger, Myron. Villages in the Sun: Mediterranean Community Architecture. New York: Praeger, 1969. OCLC 53690. According to WorldCat, the book is held in 393 libraries.
  - Spanish translation Arquitectura popular mediterránea Barcelona: G. Gili, 1993. ISBN 9788425216114
- Goldfinger, Myron. Myron Goldfinger, Architect. New York City, NY: Artium Books, 1992 ISBN 9780963314406
- Goldfinger, Myron The Goldfinger Caribbean: New York : Artium Books, 2005 ISBN 9780963314413
