= El Mirón Cave =

Cave and archaeological site in Spain

- location in Spain El Mirón Cave (Spain)
- 43°14′47″N 3°27′4″W
- Type: Cave
- Location: Asón river valley
- Region: Cantabria, Spain

The El Mirón Cave is a large cave in the upper Asón river valley towards the eastern end of Cantabria in northern Spain, near the border of the Basque country. It is an archaeological site in Ramales de la Victoria. It is known for a skeleton belonging to a woman nicknamed The Red Lady of El Mirón. She is estimated to have died around 18,700 years ago, during the Upper Paleolithic (Magdalenian). The skeleton is estimated to be that of a woman between 35 and 40 years. Her bones were coated with ochre, a red iron-based pigment, hence, her name.

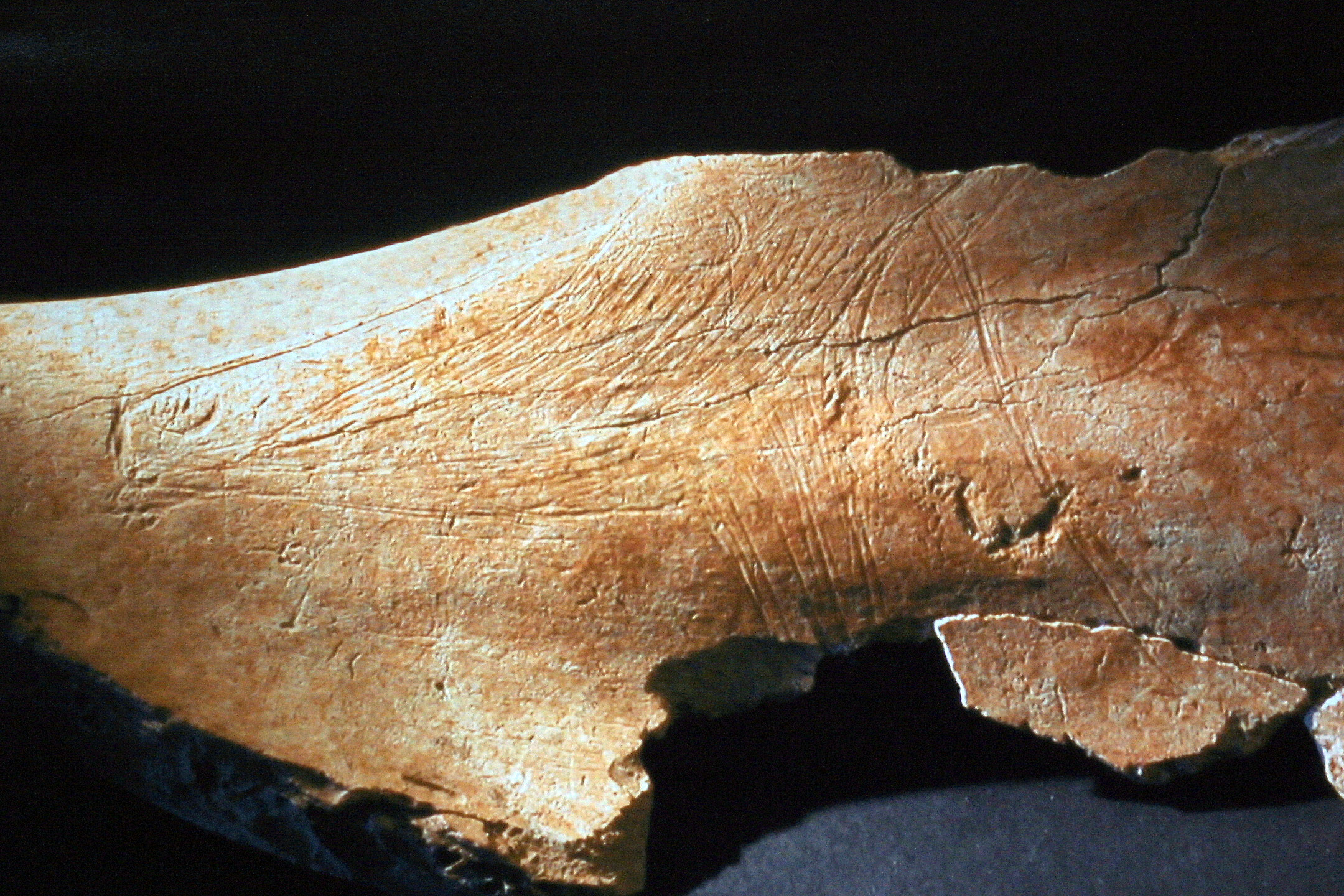
Striation-engraved red deer scapula from El Mirón Cave

The cave was discovered in 1903 by amateur archaeologists Hermilio Alcalde del Río and Lorenzo Sierra. It contains a rich collection of Upper Paleolithic art. Among the prominent art there are the engravings of a horse and possibly one of a bison. The first systematic excavation started only in 1996. The team of archaeologists, led by Lawrence Straus of the University of New Mexico and Manuel González Morales of the University of Cantabria, made a discovery of a number of prehistoric remains. The Red Lady was discovered in 2010. The cave contains a large limestone block towards the rear. A narrow space running through the block was the location of the skeleton.
