= Myron Winslow Adams =

Clergyman and fourth president of Atlanta University, Atlanta, Georgia, USA

Myron Winslow Adams (27 November 1860 in Gilsum, New Hampshire– 1939) was a clergyman and fourth president of Atlanta University. He attended Dartmouth College and received his bachelor's degree in 1881. He received his Ph.D. from Hartford Seminary in 1895. Adams joined Atlanta University in 1889 as an instructor of Greek, and later served as dean of faculty for twenty seven years before becoming president. Adams served as interim president for four years before being officially appointed in 1923. He remained in the post until 1929.
