= National Register of Historic Places listings in Marshall County, South Dakota =

Location of Marshall County in South Dakota

This is a list of the National Register of Historic Places listings in Marshall County, South Dakota.

This is intended to be a complete list of the properties and districts on the National Register of Historic Places in Marshall County, South Dakota, United States. The locations of National Register properties and districts for which the latitude and longitude coordinates are included below, may be seen in a map.

There are 9 properties and districts listed on the National Register in the county.

This National Park Service list is complete through NPS recent listings posted March 21, 2025.

== Current listings ==
	Name on the Register	Image	Date listed	Location	City or town	Description
1	Archaeological Site 39ML0002		July 3, 2024 (#100008357)	Address Restricted	Lake City vicinity	
2	Archaeological Site 39ML0012		November 20, 2023 (#100008356)	Address Restricted	Britton vicinity	
3	Archaeological Site 39ML0032		September 3, 2024 (#100008358)	Address Restricted	Lake City vicinity	
4	Britton Clinic and Hospital	Britton Clinic and Hospital	February 19, 2008 (#08000051)	Northeastern corner of Main and 7th Sts. 45°47′33″N 97°45′00″W	Britton	
5	First Presbyterian Church of Langford	First Presbyterian Church of Langford	November 1, 1991 (#91001616)	Junction of Main and Findley Sts. 45°36′10″N 97°49′56″W	Langford	
6	Fort Sisseton	Fort Sisseton	May 10, 1973 (#73001745)	Southeast of Britton; 45°39′28″N 97°31′50″W	Britton	
7	William T. and Rebecca Glendenning House	William T. and Rebecca Glendenning House	February 19, 2008 (#08000052)	204 9th Ave. 45°47′50″N 97°45′14″W	Britton	
8	Marshall County Courthouse	Marshall County Courthouse	February 14, 2006 (#06000047)	911 Vander Horck Ave. 45°47′27″N 97°45′16″W	Britton	
9	Palestine Evangelical Lutheran Church	Palestine Evangelical Lutheran Church	March 5, 1982 (#82003931)	Northeast of Veblen; 45°55′17″N 97°15′53″W	Veblen	

== See also ==
- List of National Historic Landmarks in South Dakota
- National Register of Historic Places listings in South Dakota
