= List of Savannah State University alumni =

This list of Savannah State University alumni includes graduates, non-graduate former students and current students of Georgia State Industrial College for Colored Youth, Georgia State College, Savannah State College, and/or Savannah State University. Notable administration, faculty, and staff are found on the list of Savannah State University faculty.

Savannah State University is a four-year, state-supported, historically black university (HBCU) located in Savannah, Georgia. The first baccalaureate degree was awarded in 1898. In 1928 the college became a full four-year degree-granting institution and removed the high school and normal school programs. In 1932 the school became a full member institution of the University System of Georgia.

== Academics ==
| Name | Class year | Notability | Reference(s) |
|---|---|---|---|
| Charles Elmore | | African-American scholar and jazz historian | |
| George E. Kent | 1941 | Professor of literature (with a specialism in Afro-American literature) | |

== Business ==
| Name | Class year | Notability | Reference(s) |
|---|---|---|---|
| Jerome Miller | 1975 | Retired vice president for diversity and inclusion, Toyota Motor Inc; held other vice president and executive positions with the Coca-Cola Company, Delta Air Lines, and TIAA | |

== Politics and public service ==
| Name | Class year | Notability | Reference(s) |
|---|---|---|---|
| Curtis Cooper | | Savannah-area civil rights leader | |
| Edna P. Jackson | | Member of the National League of Cities board of directors and former Mayor of Savannah, Georgia | |
| W. W. Law | 1948 | Civil rights leader and preservationist | |
| Barbara J. Mobley | 1969 | Former member of the DeKalb County Georgia State Court bench, former member of the Georgia House of Representatives | |
| Robert E. Robinson | 1971 | Civil rights attorney and member of the Savannah City Council | |

== U.S. military services ==
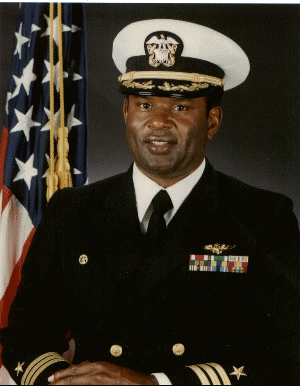
Official U.S. Navy photo of Retired U.S. Navy Captain Donnie Cochran

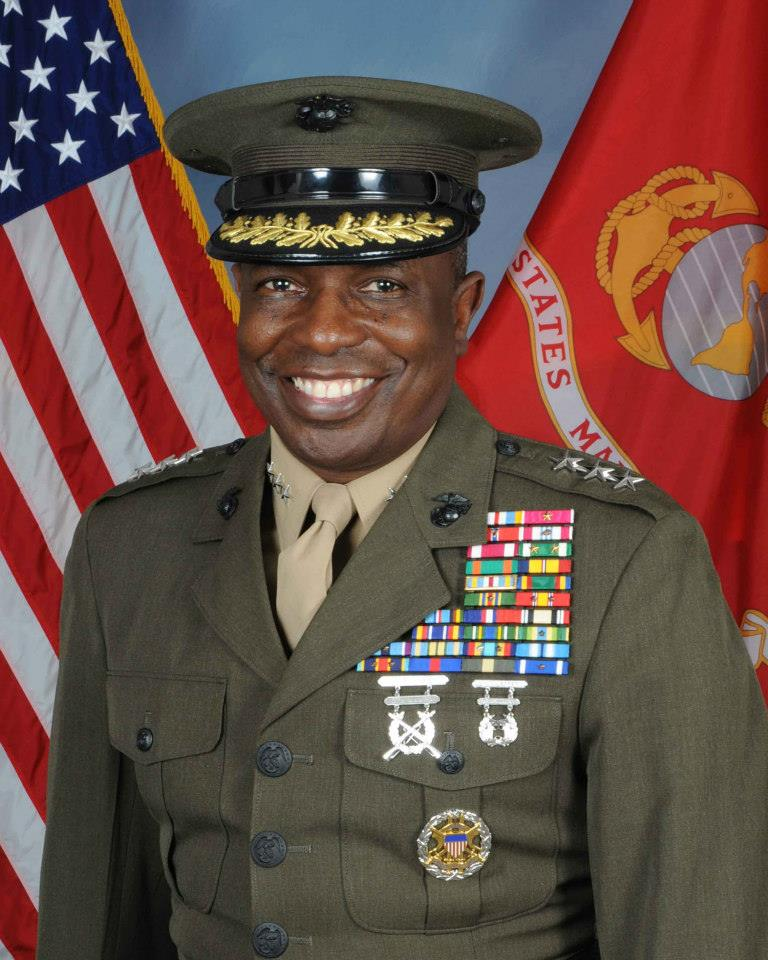
Lieutenant General Walter E. Gaskin, United States Marine Corps

| Name | Class year | Notability | Reference(s) |
|---|---|---|---|
| Annie B. Andrews | 1983 | Retired U.S. Navy rear admiral who served as the director of the Total Force Requirements Division (OPNAV N12); current assistant administrator for human resource management for the U.S. Federal Aviation Administration | |
| Donnie Cochran | 1976 | Retired U.S. Navy captain, completed two tours with the United States Navy Flight Demonstration Squadron, the Blue Angels | |
| Walter E. Gaskin | 1971 | Lieutenant general, U.S. Marine Corps; retired in 2013 at the rank of lieutenant general as the deputy chairman, NATO Committee in Brussels; previously vice director, Joint Staff; in June 2006, became the commanding general of Marine Corps Second Division, making him the senior ranking active-duty African-American Marine and first African American to command a Marine Corps division | |
| James E. Wright | | Flight instructor for the World War II Tuskegee Airmen | |

== Journalists and news media personalities ==
| Name | Class year | Notability | Reference(s) |
|---|---|---|---|
| Kareem McMichael | 2009 | News content specialist (WTOC), actor and film producer | |
| JaQuitta Williams | 1993 | Former anchor/reporter for WSB-TV, ABC affiliate in Atlanta, Georgia | |

== Athletics ==
| Name | Class year | Notability | Reference(s) |
|---|---|---|---|
| Steven Aycock | 1993 | Former head football coach at Johnson C. Smith University | |
| Bobby Curtis | 1987 | Former National Football League player with the Washington Redskins and New York Jets | |
| Roy Ellison | 1987 | National Football League official and umpire during Super Bowl XLIII | |
| Troy Hambrick | 2000 | Former National Football League running back | |
| Matt "Showbiz" Jackson | 1983 | Former member of the Harlem Globetrotters | |
| Jessie Kenlaw | 1975 | Interim head coach of the WNBA's Washington Mystics; former assistant coach with the WNBA Seattle Storm and Washington Mystics | |
| John Mathis | 1967 | Former American Basketball Association forward for the New Jersey Americans | |
| Wesley McGriff | 1990 | Defensive backs coach and defensive recruiting coordinator for the Vanderbilt Commodores; former defensive backs coach for the Miami Hurricanes and former interim coach and defensive coordinator at Savannah State University | |
| Ernest "The Cat" Miller | | Former professional wrestler | |
| Shannon Sharpe | 1991 | Former National Football League player; three-time Super Bowl champion; second to Tony Gonzalez for most receptions (815), receiving yards (10,060), and TD receptions (62) by a tight end in an NFL career; TV presenter, co-hosted Skip and Shannon: Undisputed with Skip Bayless; co-hosted ESPN First Take with Stephen A Smith and Molly Qerim; co hosts "Nightcap" with Chad "Ochocinco" Johnson | |

== See also ==
- Savannah State University alumni (category)
