= Palestine Evangelical Lutheran Church =

Historic church in South Dakota, United States

- U.S. National Register of Historic Places
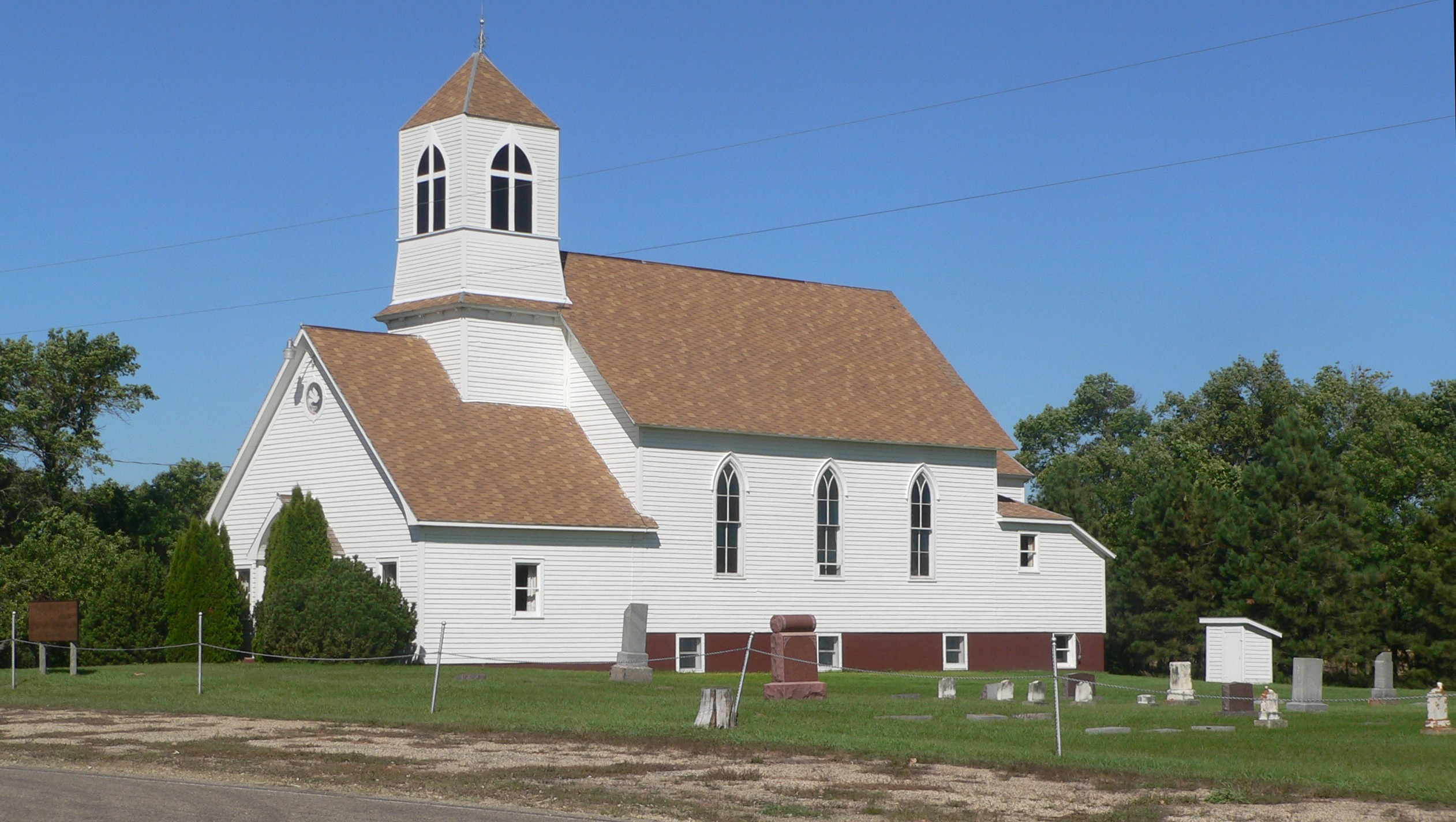

- Location within South Dakota Location within the United States
- Nearest city: Veblen, South Dakota
- Coordinates: 45.921359°N 97.264679°W
- Built: 1903
- Architectural style: Gothic
- NRHP reference No.: 82003931
- Added to NRHP: March 5, 1982

Palestine Evangelical Lutheran Church is a church in Marshall County, South Dakota. The church is situated northeast of Veblen, South Dakota. The church was built in Victorian Gothic style during 1903. It was added to the National Register of Historic Places in 1982.
