= Lyle Bien =

US Navy vice admiral

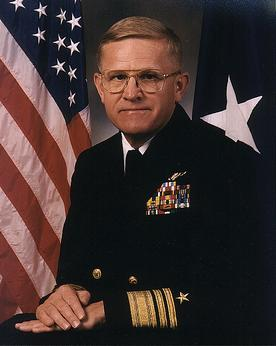
- Bien in 1996
- Born: December 1, 1945 (age 80); Britton, South Dakota, U.S.
- Alma mater: Augustana College (BS); National War College
- Spouse: Cathy Bien (m. 1972; died 2013)
- Military career
- Allegiance: United States of America
- Branch: United States Navy
- Service years: 1967–1999
- Rank: Vice admiral
- Units: VF-154 (1968–1971); VF-124 (1971–1975); VF-2 (1975–1977)
- Commands: Carrier Air Wing Fifteen; Carrier Group Seven; Deputy Commander, Naval Space Command
- Conflicts: Vietnam War; Third Taiwan Strait Crisis
- Awards: Defense Superior Service Medal

Lyle G. Bien (born December 1, 1945) is a retired vice admiral in the United States Navy. He served during the Vietnam War, where he instructed students on piloting the F-14 Tomcat, and later became an instructor at the United States Navy Fighter Weapons School (TOPGUN). He served as deputy commander of the United States Space Command between 1996 and 1998.

He is the recipient of several military awards, including the Defense Superior Service Medal, 11 Air Medals, a Meritorious Service Medal, and the Vietnamese Gallantry Cross.

At the time of his retirement in 1999, Bien was the highest-ranking naval officer in South Dakota history, as well as the state's first three-star admiral. He was inducted into the South Dakota Hall of Fame in 1997.

== Early life ==
Lyle Bien was born on December 1, 1945, in Britton, South Dakota, one of seven children born to Emil and Clara Bien. He was raised on his family's cattle ranch, which had been established by his grandfather, an immigrant from Norway. He first attended classes in a one-room schoolhouse before attending Veblen High School, graduating in 1963. Bien's father died when he was a sophomore, and his mother took over operation of the ranch. He initially planned to earn a college degree and then return home to the ranch. He enrolled at Augustana College, where he graduated with a Bachelor of Science in biology in 1967.

== Military career ==
=== Vietnam War ===
In 1967, knowing a draft for the Vietnam War was approaching, Bien decided to enlist. Upon arriving at the recruitment office, he was attracted to the prospect of becoming a pilot and enlisted in the United States Navy. Bien attended the Officer Candidate School and upon graduation was appointed a naval flight officer. Ahead of his deployment, he received further training with the F-4 Phantom Fleet Replacement Squadron at the Marine Corps Air Station Miramar. He was then assigned to Strike Fighter Squadron 154 (VFA-154) aboard the USS Ranger.

Although he initially signed on for three years, Bien opted to stay when given the opportunity to be one of the first pilots to fly the Grumman F-14 Tomcat. In 1971, he was reassigned to Fighter Squadron 124 (VF-124) as an instructor for the first students to learn to pilot the F-14. Between 1975 and 1977, he was stationed aboard the USS Enterprise and completed a further two deployments into Southeast Asia with Fighter Squadron 2.

Bien flew 225 combat missions during his time in Vietnam.

=== Later career ===
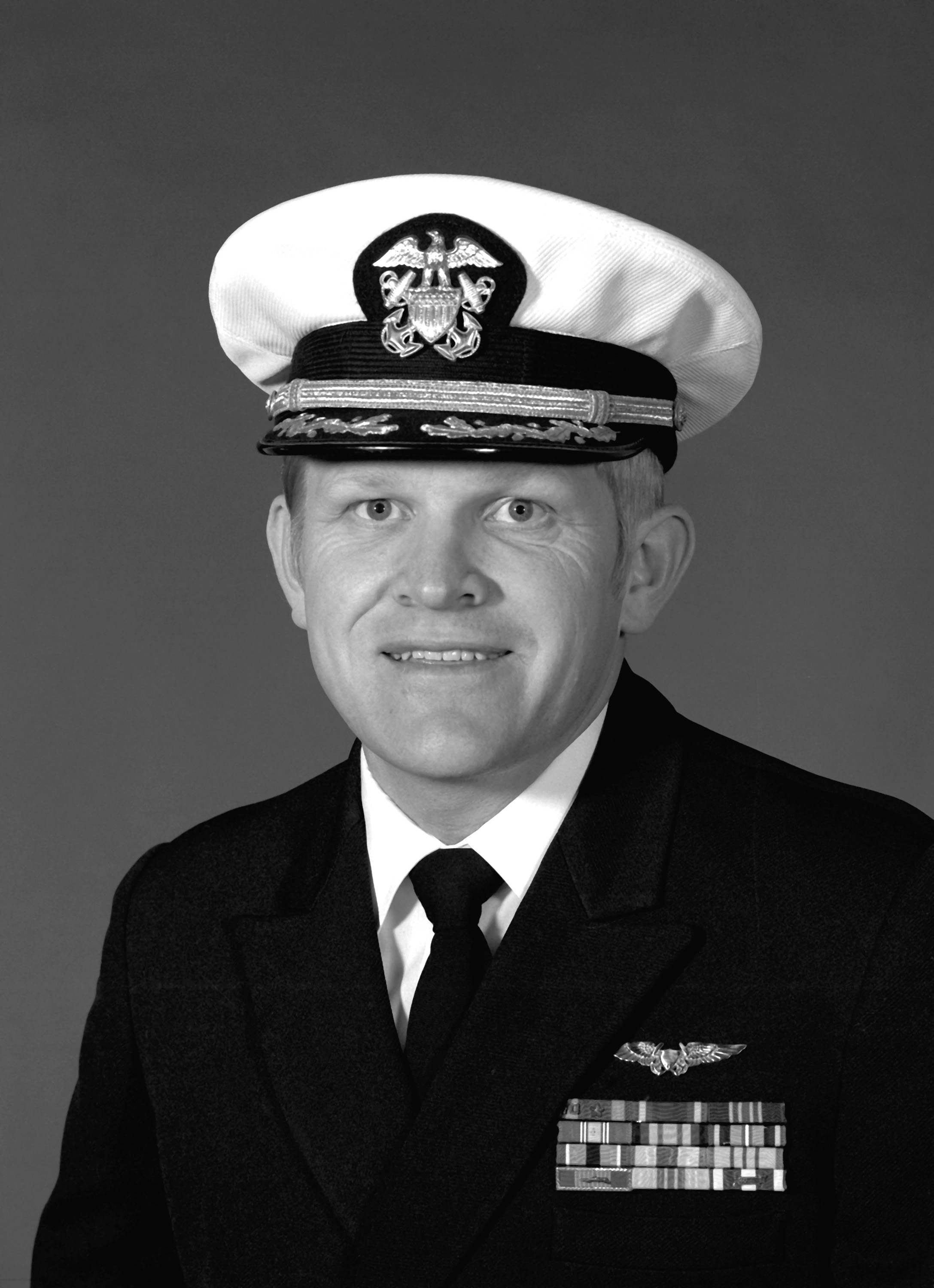
Bien in 1981

In 1981, Bien became an instructor at the United States Navy Fighter Weapons School (TOPGUN). His squadron participated in shooting some of the flight scenes for the 1986 film Top Gun.

In February 1986, Bien became Deputy Air Group Commander of Carrier Air Wing Fifteen (CVW-15) aboard the USS Carl Vinson. He later attended training at the National War College (NWC) to prepare to take command of CVW-15, which he did on May 8, 1987.

Bien served as a Navy advisor at The Pentagon. As part of preparations for Operation Desert Shield and Operation Desert Storm during the Gulf War, Bien served as the senior Navy strike planner between October 1990 and March 1991 under Norman Schwarzkopf in Riyadh, Saudi Arabia.

He assisted in an investigation into naval policies that may have contributed to the 1994 death of Kara Hultgreen, a naval aviator who crashed while attempting to land on the USS Abraham Lincoln. Several officers raised concerns that Hultgreen's mistakes during training had been overlooked in favor of pushing her through as the Navy's first female fighter pilot. In 1995, Bien was sent to San Diego to investigate and reported that the allegations were likely true, and that female pilots were to be pushed through training regardless of their scores. However, Bien also stated he "found no small number of VF-124 instructors who were emotionally predisposed to see women aviators fail".

Bien joined the Naval Space Command for one year. He then reported as commander of Carrier Group Seven, which included the USS Nimitz and her assigned ships. Bien's unit helped resolve the Third Taiwan Strait Crisis in 1996. President Bill Clinton deployed Bien's command to the Taiwan Strait to stop missile drills being carried out by mainland China. In 2003, Bien was commended by Taiwanese President Chen Shui-bian for his involvement in ending the crisis. Bien presented Chen with a cowboy hat "representing freedom and a free run of the prairie".

Between 1996 and 1998, Bien served as commander of the Naval Space Command.

== Retirement ==
At the time of his retirement in 1999, Bien was the highest-ranking naval officer in South Dakota history. By then, he had logged over 5,500 flight hours in fighter aircraft—2,900 of those in the F-14—and completed 1,300 aircraft carrier landings.

== Personal life ==
Bien met his wife, Cathy, upon returning from Vietnam in 1971. Cathy had previously been engaged to Terry Ryan, also a naval flight officer, who was killed in an aircraft accident in 1970. Bien had written to Cathy, offering his condolences, and the two began dating. During a trip to South Dakota while they were engaged, Cathy was involved in a horseback riding accident and was left paraplegic. They married eight weeks later while Cathy was still in the hospital. They were married until Cathy's death in 2013.

== Awards and decorations ==
Bien has received multiple military and personnel awards, including:

=== Military decorations ===
- Defense Superior Service Medal
- 3 Legions of Merit
- Meritorious Service Medal
- 11 Air Medals
- Navy Unit Commendation
- 3 Meritorious Unit Commendations
- Navy Expeditionary Medal
- Vietnamese Gallantry Cross

=== Other awards ===
- Augustana College Alumni of the Year
- 1997: South Dakota Hall of Fame inductee
- 2019: South Dakota Aviation Hall of Fame's Combat Air Crew Memorial inductee

== See also ==
- Leadership of the United States Space Command
