= Sunset Colony, South Dakota =

- Census-designated place
- Location within South Dakota Location within the United States
- Coordinates: 45°48′22″N 97°53′09″W
- Country: United States
- State: South Dakota
- County: Marshall

Area
  - Total: 1.00 sq mi (2.59 km^{2})
  - Land: 0.97 sq mi (2.52 km^{2})
  - Water: 0.031 sq mi (0.08 km^{2})
- Elevation: 1,319 ft (402 m)

Population (2020)
  - Total: 142
  - Density: 146.1/sq mi (56.42/km^{2})
- Time zone: UTC-6 (Central (CST))
  - Summer (DST): UTC-5 (CDT)
- ZIP Code: 57430 (Britton)
- Area code: 605
- FIPS code: 46-62434
- GNIS feature ID: 2813049

Sunset Colony is a Hutterite colony and census-designated place (CDP) in Marshall County, South Dakota, United States. The population was 142 at the 2020 census. It was first listed as a CDP prior to the 2020 census.

It is in the western part of the county, 7 miles (11 km) by road west of Britton, the county seat.

== Demographics ==
Historical population
Census	Pop.	Note	%±
2020	142		—
U.S. Decennial Census
