= Arthur Akre =

American politician (1906–1982)

Member of the South Dakota House of Representatives
- In office 1953–1954

Personal details
- Born: October 8, 1906 Veblen, South Dakota, U.S.
- Died: February 19, 1982 (aged 75)
- Party: Republican

Arthur Akre (October 8, 1906 – February 19, 1982) was an American politician. He served as a Republican member of the South Dakota House of Representatives.

== Life and career ==
Akre was born in Veblen, South Dakota on October 8, 1906.

In 1953, Akre was elected to the South Dakota House of Representatives, representing Marshall County, South Dakota, serving until 1954.

Akre died on February 19, 1982, at the age of 75.
