= Newport Colony, South Dakota =

- Census-designated place
- Location within South Dakota Location within the United States
- Coordinates: 45°40′45″N 97°55′58″W
- Country: United States
- State: South Dakota
- County: Marshall

Area
  - Total: 0.25 sq mi (0.66 km^{2})
  - Land: 0.25 sq mi (0.66 km^{2})
  - Water: 0 sq mi (0.00 km^{2})
- Elevation: 1,309 ft (399 m)

Population (2020)
  - Total: 114
  - Density: 448.0/sq mi (172.98/km^{2})
- Time zone: UTC-6 (Central (CST))
  - Summer (DST): UTC-5 (CDT)
- ZIP Code: 57432 (Claremont)
- Area code: 605
- FIPS code: 46-45024
- GNIS feature ID: 2813050

Newport Colony is a Hutterite colony and census-designated place (CDP) in Marshall County, South Dakota, United States. The population was 114 at the 2020 census. It was first listed as a CDP prior to the 2020 census.

It is in the southwest part of the county, 4 miles (6 km) east of Claremont and 16 miles (26 km) southwest of Britton, the county seat.

== Demographics ==
Historical population
Census	Pop.	Note	%±
2020	114		—
U.S. Decennial Census
