= Curtis Cooper (activist) =

American activist (1932–2000)

Curtis V. Cooper (1932 – January 2000) was an American health care and civil rights leader from Georgia.

== Early background ==
Cooper was born in 1932 in Savannah, Georgia, and had Black heritage. He graduated from Savannah State College but his lack of financial resources prevented him from achieving his dream of becoming a physician.

== Civil rights leader ==
Cooper took part in the civil rights movement. He was a leader in the local Youth Council of the National Association for the Advancement of Colored People (NAACP) and later became president of the NAACP Savannah Branch.

== Health care provider ==
Cooper is credited with reshaping health care for the poor in his native city. In 1972, he secured funds for the establishment of a comprehensive health center for the city's indigent and served as its executive director. Under his management, it grew into the Westside-Urban Health Center, a major medical resource.

In 1984, Cooper became one of the first black members of Memorial Medical Center's board of directors. In 1995, he became chairman of that same board. He also was the chairman of the Chatham County Hospital Authority twice and he served on the Georgia State Access to Health Care Commission and the Georgia State Health Strategies Council.

== Death ==
Cooper died in January 2000. Soon after, the Georgia House of Representatives passed a resolution to express their regret at the passing of Curtis V. Cooper and convey their sincerest sympathy to the members of his family.

== Honor ==
The following landmark was named to honor Curtis Cooper:

- The Curtis V. Cooper Garden, a terrasse from the Savannah International Trade & Convention Center
