= Marshall County Courthouse (South Dakota) =

- U.S. National Register of Historic Places
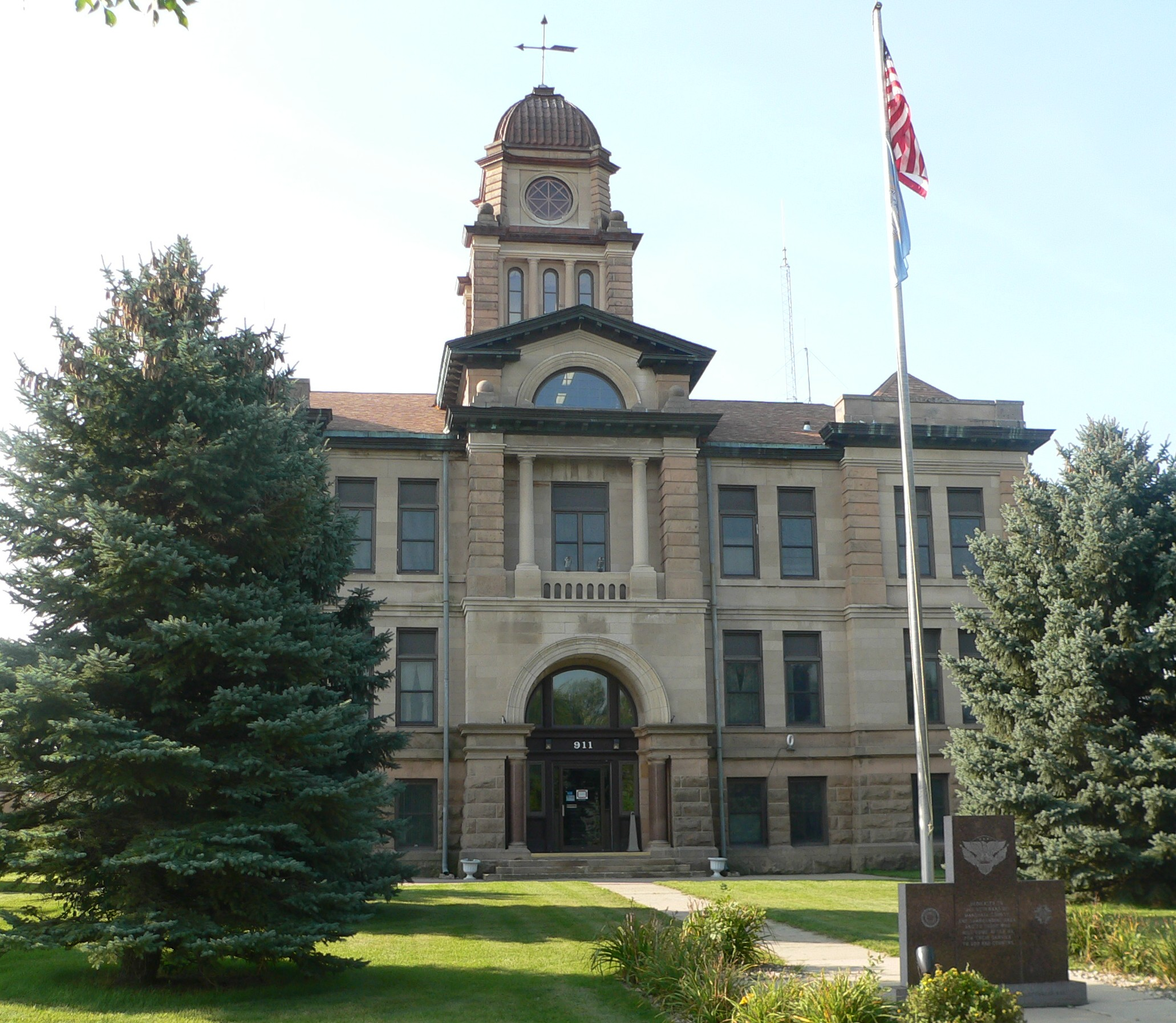

- Location within South Dakota Location within the United States
- Interactive map showing the location of Marshall County Courthouse
- Location: 911 Vander Horck Ave., Britton, South Dakota
- Coordinates: 45.790766°N 97.754320°W
- Built: 1908
- Built by: Wold & Johnson
- Architect: Bell & Detweiler
- Architectural style: Renaissance Revival
- MPS: County Courthouses of South Dakota MPS
- NRHP reference No.: 06000047
- Added to NRHP: February 14, 2006

The Marshall County Courthouse in Britton, in the state of South Dakota in the Midwestern United States, was built in 1908. It was listed on the National Register of Historic Places in 2006.

It is a three-and-a-half-story building. It replaced use of the former Arlington Hotel as county courthouse, and solidified the selection of Britton as the county seat of Marshall County.
