= Newark, South Dakota =

Unincorporated community in South Dakota

Coordinates: 45°55′46″N 97°47′29″W

Newark is an unincorporated community in Marshall County, in the U.S. state of South Dakota.

== History ==
Newark was laid out in 1884, and named after Newark, New Jersey. A post office called Newark was established in 1883, and remained in operation until 1958.
