= Spain, South Dakota =

Unincorporated community in South Dakota, U.S.

Coordinates: 45°42′11″N 97°47′09″W

Spain is an unincorporated community in Marshall County, in the U.S. state of South Dakota.

== History ==
A post office called Spain was established in 1888, and remained in operation until 1942. According to the Federal Writers' Project, the origin of the name Spain is obscure.
