= List of Savannah State University faculty =

This list of Savannah State University faculty includes current and former faculty, staff and presidents of Georgia State Industrial College for Colored Youth, Georgia State College, Savannah State College, and/or Savannah State University. Notable graduates, non-graduate former students and current students are found on the List of Savannah State University alumni.

Savannah State University is a four-year, state-supported, historically black university (HBCU) located in Savannah, Georgia. The first baccalaureate degree was awarded in 1898. In 1928 the college became a full four-year degree-granting institution and removed the high school and normal school programs. In 1932 the school became a full member institution of the University System of Georgia.

== Administration ==
=== Institute presidents ===
There have been twelve presidents in the history of Savannah State University. The current president is Cheryl Davenport Dozier.

=== Other administration ===
Name	Department	Notability	Reference
The Honorable Otis Johnson		Former faculty member and former mayor of Savannah, Georgia 2003-2011	

== Media ==
Name	Department	Notability	Reference
Shirley B. James	Student Services	Former SSU licensed professional counselor and the publisher and editor of The Savannah Tribune	

== Social Sciences ==
Name	Department	Notability	Reference
Charles J. Elmore	Mass Communications	Former SSU professor and department chair and author of An Historical Guide to Laurel Grove Cemetery South, a book on SSU’s Richard R. Wright, and The Athletic Saga of Savannah State College. Elmore’s last publication is All That Savannah Jazz published in 1999	
Francys Johnson	Social Sciences	NAACP President of the Georgia NAACP, Former Southeast Region Director and former member of the Savannah State Social Sciences faculty	
E. J. Josey	Social Sciences	American activist and librarian who served as an instructor of Social Sciences and History (1954-1955)	
Mohamed Haji Mukhtar	Social and Behavioral Sciences	Professor of African and Middle Eastern History and noted author on the history and sociology of Somalia and Islam	

== Athletics ==
Name	Department	Notability	Reference
Horace Broadnax	Athletic	the current head men's basketball coach and a member of the 1984 NCAA Division-I Men’s National Championship Team	
Steve Davenport	Athletic	the current head football coach	
Russell Ellington	Mathematics	compiled a 148-91 record (.619 winning percentage) as Savannah State College’s men's head basketball, the most wins by a men's basketball coach in the school's history	

== See also ==
- Presidents of Savannah State University
- Savannah State University faculty
- Savannah State Tigers football coaches
