= VFP-63 =

Light Photographic Squadron 63
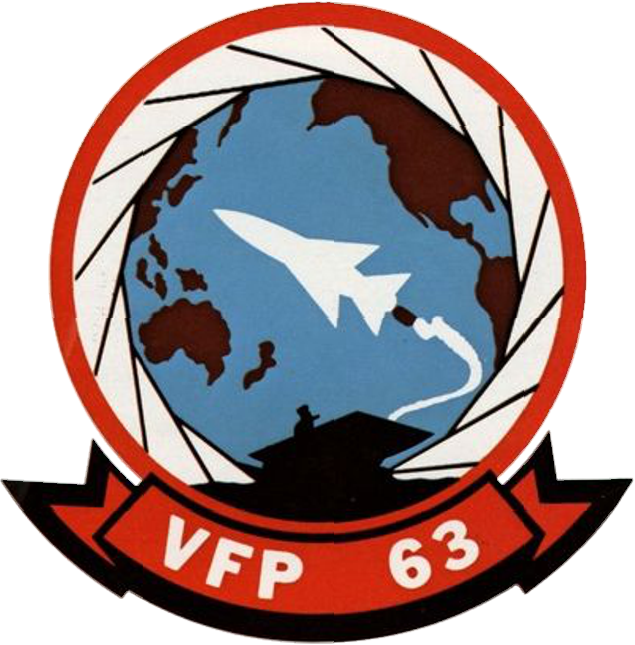
- Active: 20 January 1949 – 30 June 1982
- Country: United States
- Branch: United States Navy
- Role: Photo-reconnaissance
- Part of: Inactive
- Nickname(s): Eyes of the Fleet
- Engagements: Korean War; Vietnam War

VFP-63 was a Light Photographic Squadron of the U.S. Navy. Originally established as Composite Squadron Sixty-One (VC-61) on 20 January 1949, it was redesignated as Fighter Photographic Squadron (VFP-61) on 2 July 1956. Redesignated as Composite Photographic Squadron Sixty-Three (VCP-63) on 1 July 1959 and finally redesignated as Light Photographic Squadron Sixty-Three (VFP-63) on 1 July 1961. The squadron provided a detachment of reconnaissance planes for each of the Carrier Air Wings of the U.S. Pacific Fleet. The squadron was disestablished on 30 June 1982.

== Operational history ==
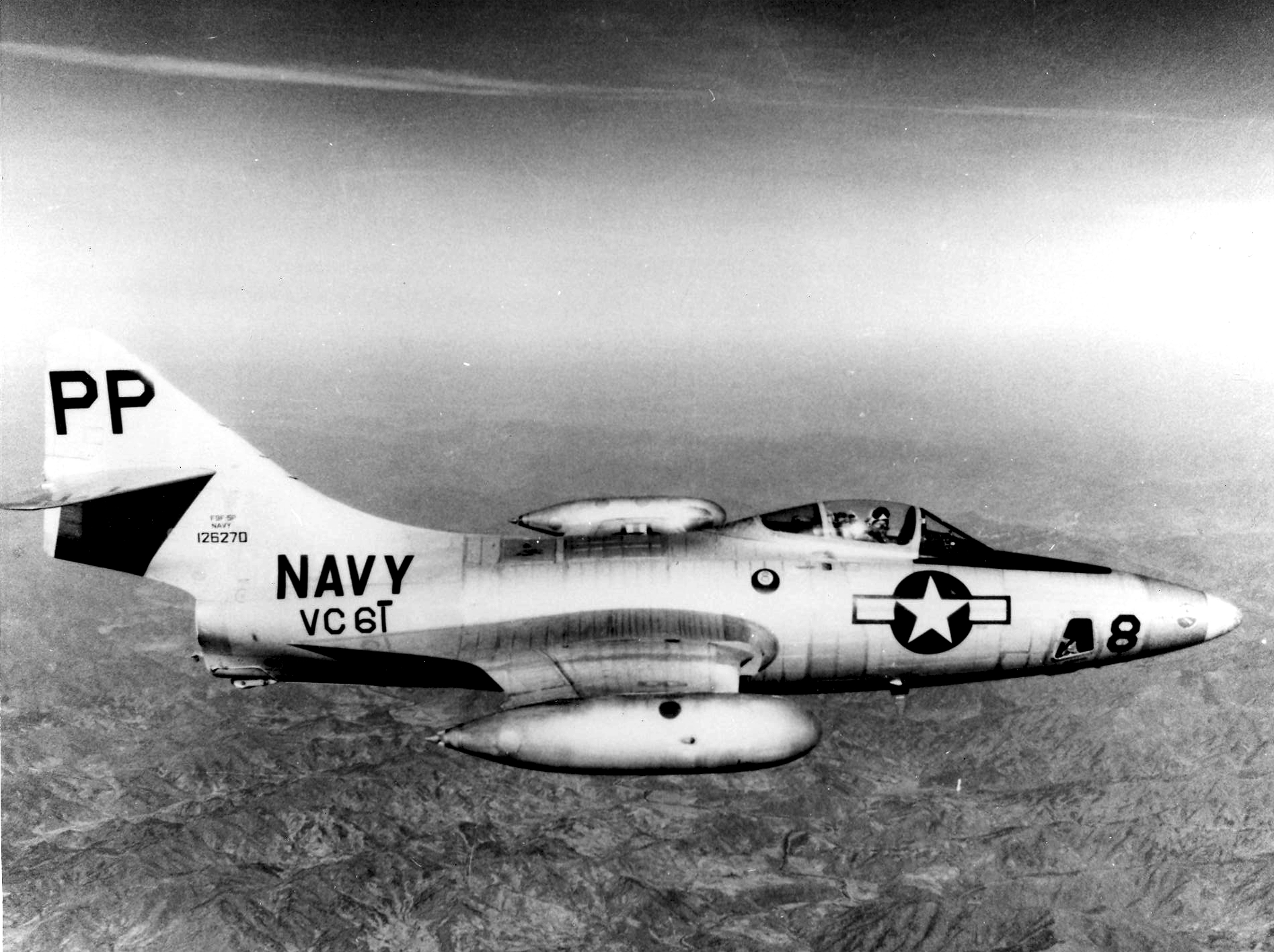
VC-61 F9F-5P Panther over NAS North Island c.1950

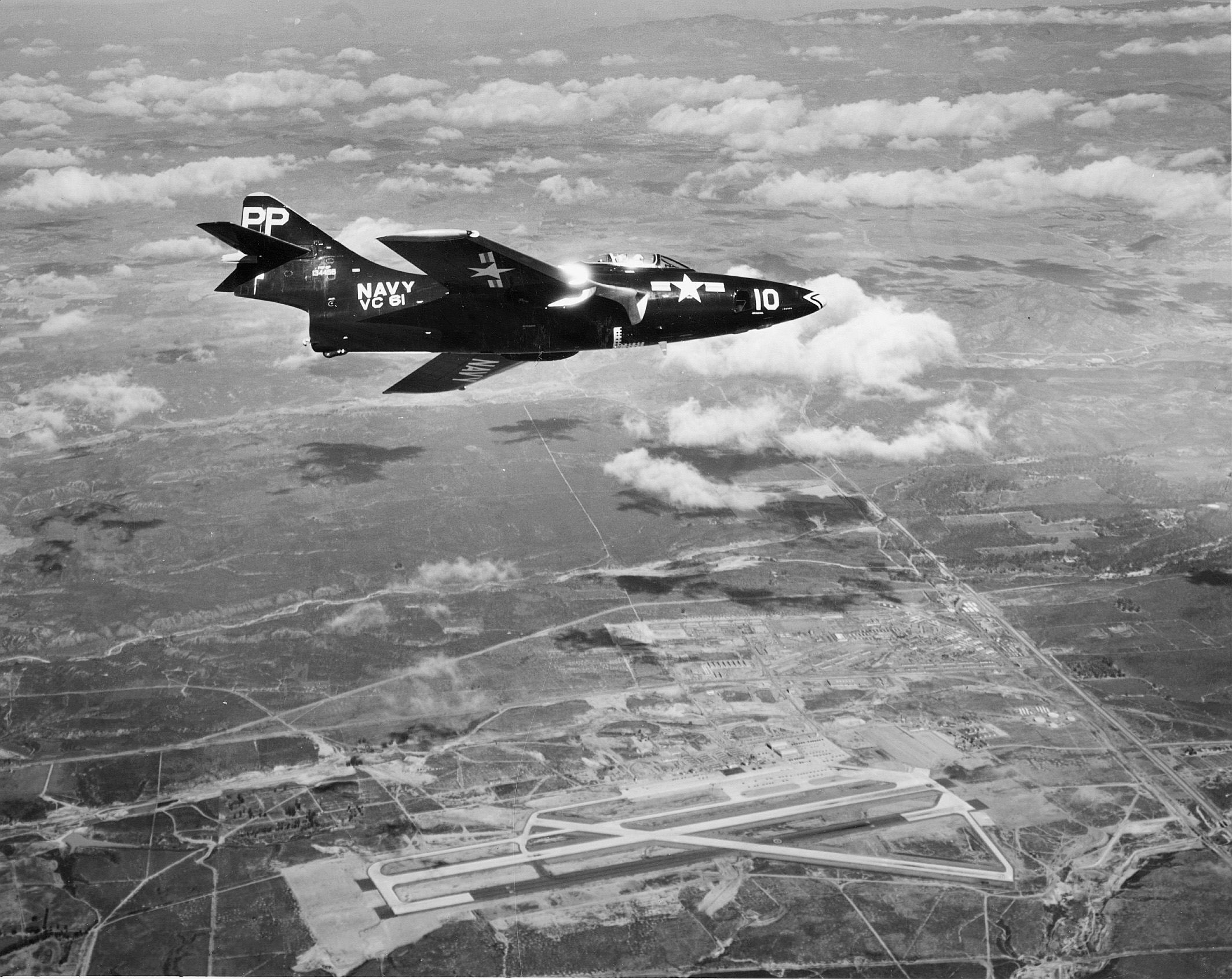
VC-61 F9F-6P Cougar over NAS Miramar in 1954

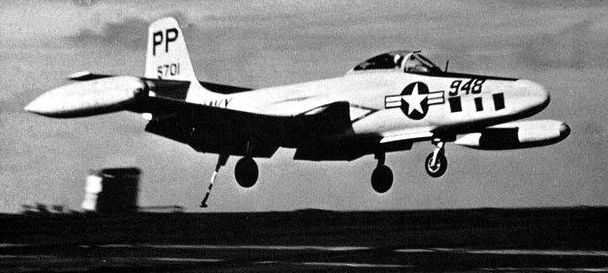
VFP-61 F2H-2P Banshee lands on USS Ticonderoga (CV-14) c.1957

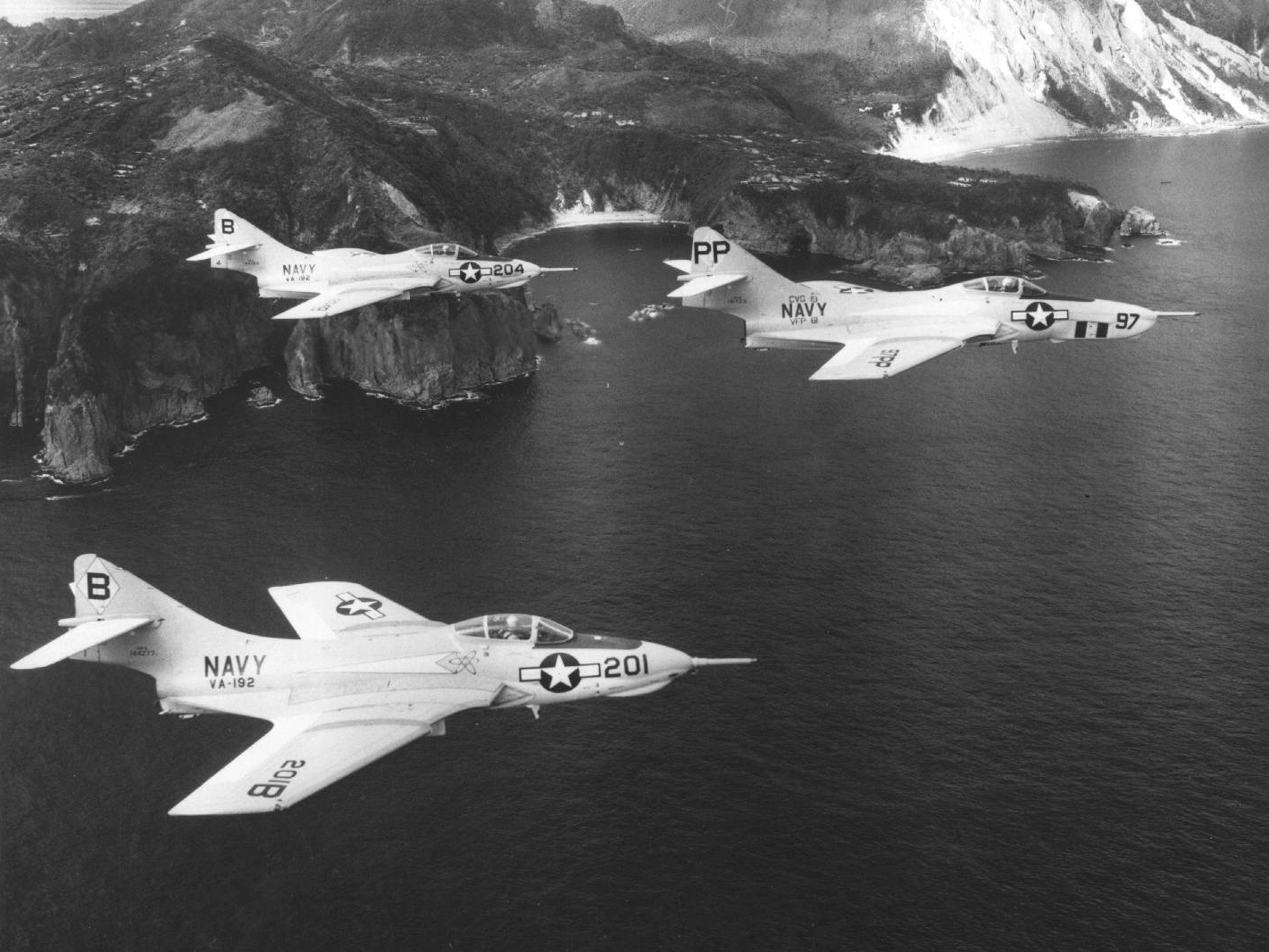
F9F Cougars of VA-192 and VFP-61 over Formosa (Taiwan) c.1957

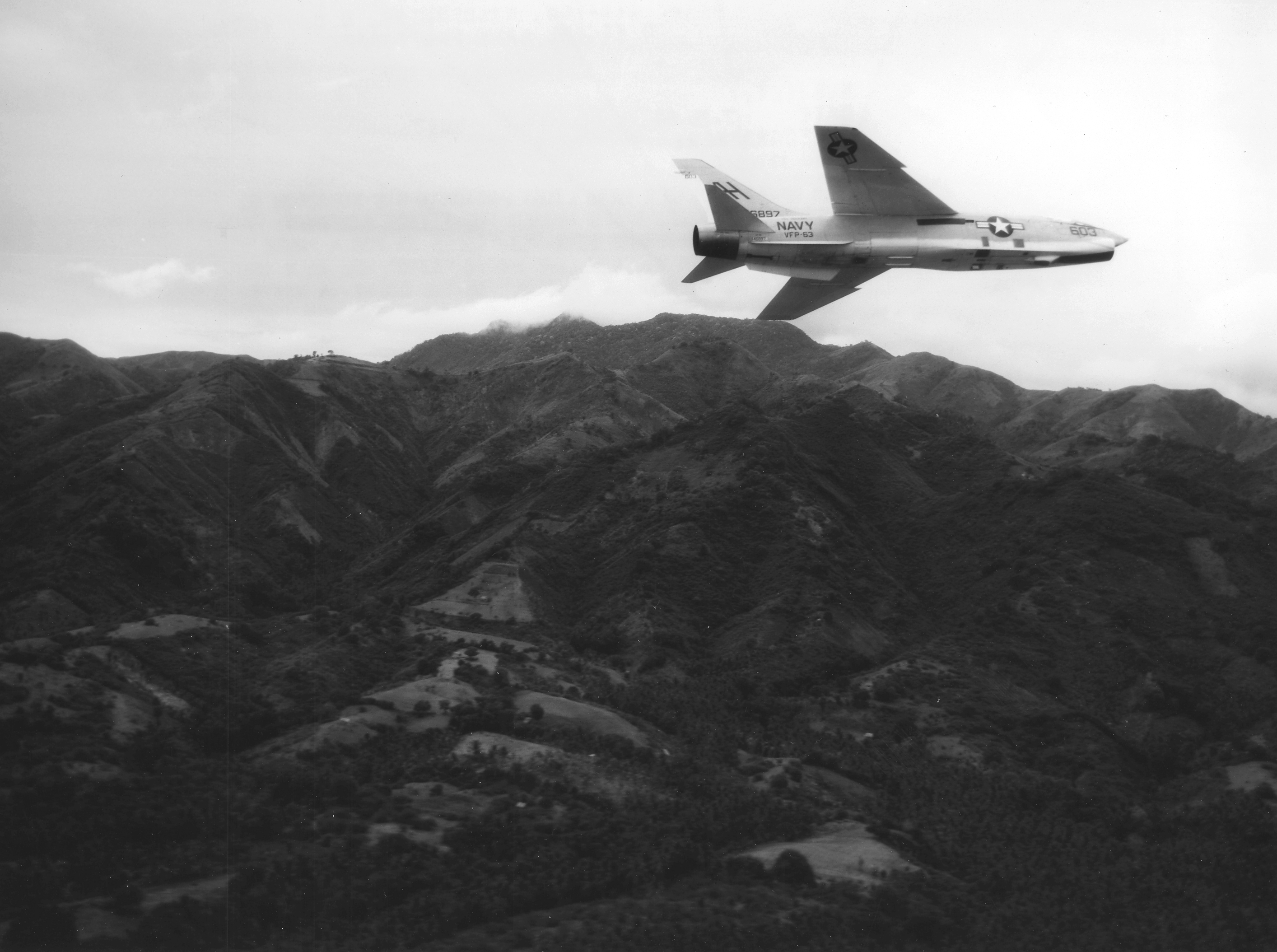
VFP-63 RF-8G Crusader over Vietnam in 1966

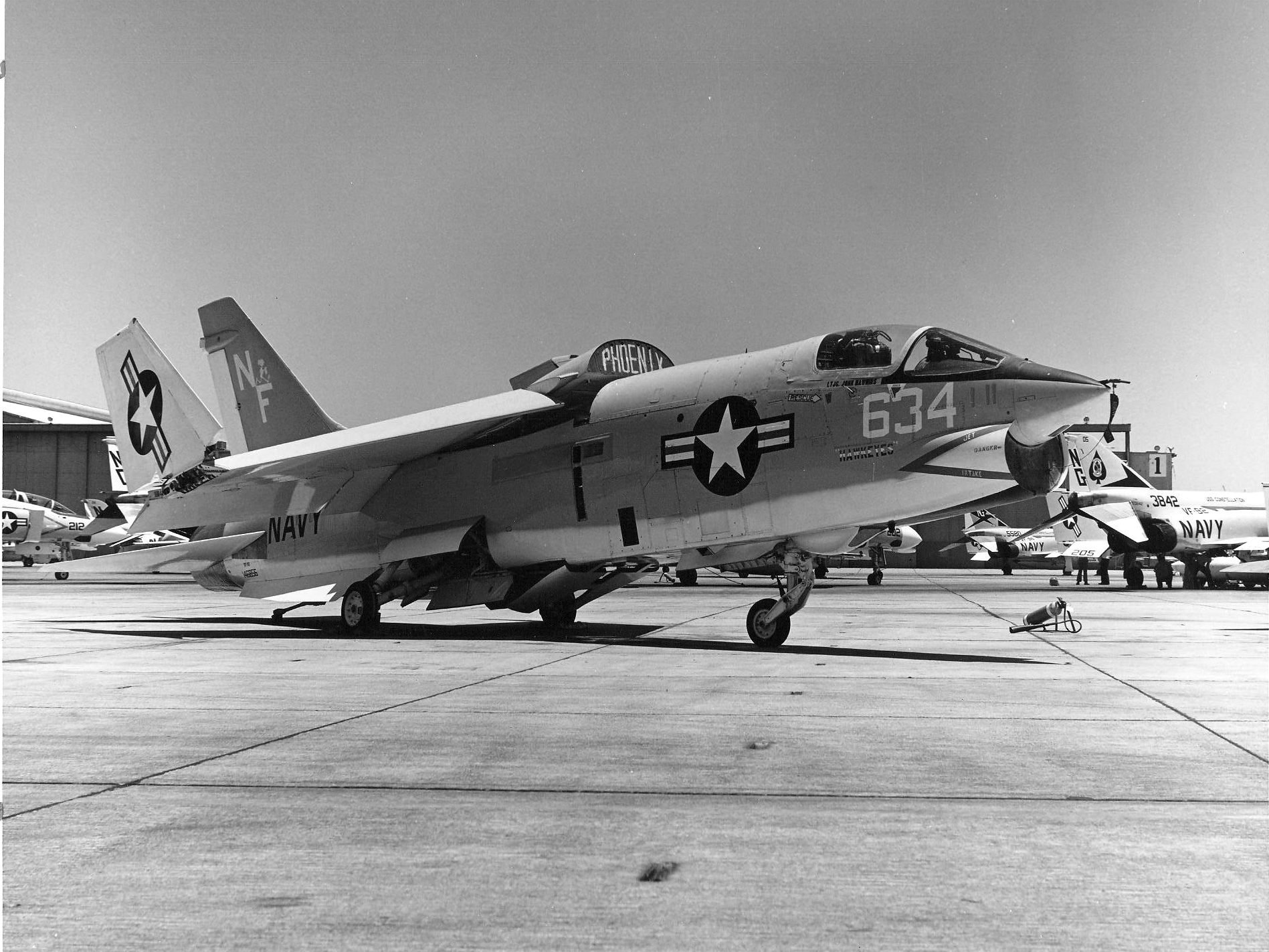
VFP-63 RF-8G at NAS Midway in 1974

=== Korean War ===
VC-61 detachments of F4U-4/5P Corsairs served until mid-1951 when they were replaced by the F9F-2P Cougar.

=== Vietnam ===
VFP-63 was the only Navy combat unit with elements continuously deployed throughout the Vietnam War. Detachments of RF-8A/G Crusaders served the following deployments:

- 17 October 1963 – 20 July 1964 Detachment C USS Kitty Hawk. On 6 June 1964 RF-8A [BuNo 146823] was shot down by anti-aircraft (AAA) fire near the Plain of Jars, Laos, becoming the first Crusader lost in combat. The pilot Lt. C. F. Klusmann was captured but escaped and returned to US forces on 31 August.
- 28 January-21 November 1964 Detachment E USS Bon Homme Richard
- 14 April-15 December 1964 Detachment B USS Ticonderoga
- 5 August 1964 – 6 May 1965 Detachment M USS Ranger
- 21 October 1964 – 29 May 1965 Detachment L USS Hancock
- 7 December 1964 – 1 November 1965 Detachment C USS Coral Sea. On 13 August RF-8A [BuNo 146849] was hit by AAA over North Vietnam, the pilot ejected and was rescued. On 8 September RF-8A [BuNo 146826] crashed into the sea 5 miles east of Quảng Khê, the pilot LTJG Charles Goodwin was listed as presumptive finding of death. until 3 June 2017 when he was accounted for On 8 October RF-8A #145617 was lost due to mechanical failure, the pilot ejected and was rescued.
- 6 March-23 November 1965 Detachment A USS Midway. On 8 May RF-8A [BuNo 145628] was hit by AAA fire over North Vietnam, the pilot ejected and was rescued. On 1 June RF-8A [BuNo 146881] was hit by AAA fire over North Vietnam, the pilot ejected and was rescued.
- 5 April-16 December 1965 Detachment G USS Oriskany. On 29 August RF-8A [BuNo 146828] was hit by AAA fire near Vinh, the pilot LT Henry McWhorter was listed as missing in action until his remains were returned in April 1986. On 8 September RF-8A [BuNo 146825] was lost to AAA fire, the pilot LTJG Robert Rudolph was listed as missing in action until his remains were returned in December 1988.
- 21 April 1965 – 13 January 1966 Detachment E USS Bon Homme Richard. On 1 June 1965 RF-8A [BuNo 146852] was shot down over Thanh Hóa Province, the pilot LTCDR Frederick Crosby was listed as killed in action, body not recovered until May 2017 when his remains were identified
- 28 September 1965 – 13 May 1966 Detachment B USS Ticonderoga. On 19 April RF-8A [BuNo 146843] was lost to AAA, the pilot ejected and was rescued.
- 10 November 1965 – 1 August 1966 Detachment L USS Hancock. On 9 April RF-8A [BuNo 144611] was hit by AAA fire, the pilot LTJG Thomas Walster ejected but drowned before SAR forces arrived. On 5 May RF-8A [BuNo 146831] was shot down by AAA, the pilot Lt John Heilig ejected and was captured, he was released on 12 February 1973. On 21 June RF-8A [BuNo 146830] was shot down by AAA, the pilot Lt Corbett Eastman ejected and was captured, he was released on 12 February 1973.
- 26 May-16 November 1966 Detachment G USS Oriskany. On 31 August 1966 an RF-8A was hit by anti-aircraft fire and crashed into Haiphong Harbour, the pilot LCDR Tom Tucker was rescued by a helicopter from USS Kearsarge.
- 29 July 1966 – 23 February 1967 Detachment A USS Coral Sea. On 8 October RF-8A [BuNo 146899] was lost to AAA, the pilot ejected and was rescued.
- 15 October 1966 – 29 May 1967 Detachment E USS Ticonderoga
- 5 January-22 July 1967 Detachment B USS Hancock
- 26 January-25 August 1967 Detachment L USS Bon Homme Richard. On 5 June RF-8A [BuNo 145614] was shot down by AAA and the pilot Commander Collin Haines was captured and held prisoner until 4 March 1973.
- 11 May-30 December 1967 Detachment 11 USS Intrepid
- 16 July 1967 – 31 January 1968 Detachment 34 USS Oriskany
- 26 July 1967 – 6 April 1968 Detachment 43 USS Coral Sea. On 21 September RF-8G [BuNo 144623] was lost to AAA fire, the pilot LTCDR Milton Vescelius was listed as missing in action until his remains were returned in August 1985.
- 27 December 1967 – 17 August 1968 Detachment 14 USS Ticonderoga. On 28 March 1968 RF-8G [BuNo 144616] was shot down by anti-aircraft fire over Laos, the pilot LTCMDR M W Wallace was listed as missing in action until his remains were identified in December 1988.
- 27 January-10 October 1968 Detachment 31 USS Bon Homme Richard. On 22 May RF-8G [BuNo 146830] was shot down by AAA, the pilot LTJG Edwin Miller ejected and was captured, he was released on 14 March 1973.
- 4 June 1968 – 8 February 1969 Detachment 11 USS Intrepid. On 21 July RF-8G [BuNo 145642] was lost due to mechanical failure, the pilot ejected and was rescued.
- 18 July 1968 – 3 March 1969 Detachment 19 USS Hancock. On 3 October RF-8G [BuNo 144620] crashed into the sea, the pilot LT James Merrick was killed.
- 7 September 1968 – 18 April 1969 Detachment 43 USS Coral Sea
- 1 February-18 September 1969 Detachment 14 USS Ticonderoga
- 18 March-29 October 1969 Detachment 31 USS Bon Homme Richard
- 16 April-17 November 1969 Detachment 34 USS Oriskany. On 24 May RF-8G [BuNo 146884] was lost in a non-combat incident, the pilot ejected and was rescued.
- 2 August 1969 – 15 April 1970 Detachment 19 USS Hancock. On 16 December 1969 RF-8G [BuNo 145611] was hit by antiaircraft fire and crashed at sea, the pilot LT Victor Buckley was listed as killed in action, body not recovered.
- 23 September 1969 – 1 July 1970 Detachment 43 USS Coral Sea
- 5 March-17 December 1970 Detachment 38 USS Shangri-La
- 2 April-12 November 1970 Detachment 31 USS Bon Homme Richard
- 14 May-10 December 1970 Detachment 34 USS Oriskany. On 14 November the landing gear on RF-8G [BuNo 145624] collapsed during launch, the pilot LT Joseph R. Klugg ejected but drowned before SAR forces could arrive.
- 22 October 1970 – 2 June 1971 Detachment 1 USS Hancock
- 16 April-6 November 1971 Detachment 3 USS Midway
- 14 May-18 December 1971 Detachment 4 USS Oriskany
- 12 November 1971 – 17 July 1972 Detachment 5 USS Coral Sea
- 7 January-3 October 1972 Detachment 1 USS Hancock. On 5 September RF-8G [BuNo 150299] collided with F-8J #150299 of VF-24, both pilots ejected and were rescued.
- 10 April 1972 – 3 March 1973 Detachment 3 USS Midway. On 16 June RF-8G [BuNo 145613] was hit by AAA near the Thanh Hóa Bridge, the pilot ejected and was rescued. On 22 July RF-8G was hit by AAA, the pilot LTCDR Gordon Paige ejected and was captured, he was released on 29 March 1973.
- 5 June 1972 – 30 March 1973 Detachment 4 USS Oriskany. On 13 December 1972 RF-8G [BuNo 144608] was destroyed in a non-combat incident.
- 9 March-8 November 1973 Detachment 5 USS Coral Sea
- 8 May 1973 – 8 January 1974 Detachment 1 USS Hancock

=== 1970s to disestablishment ===
In August 1972 with the Crusader being replaced as a frontline Navy fighter, F-8 training squadron VF-124 transferred its remaining aircraft and the training mission to VFP-63.

On 28 May 1982 the squadron's last two RF-8s were flown to Davis–Monthan Air Force Base for storage.

== Home port assignments ==
NAS Miramar

== Aircraft assignment ==
- F4U-5P Corsair
- F2H-2P Banshee
- F9F-5P Panther
- F9F-2/6P Cougar
- A-3D-2P/RA-3B Skywarrior - 1 July 1959
- RF-8A/G Crusader

== Notable former members ==
- Donnie Cochran
- Kathleen Paige

== See also ==
- Reconnaissance aircraft
- List of inactive United States Navy aircraft squadrons
- History of the United States Navy
