= Donnie Cochran =

United States Navy naval aviator (born 1954)

Donnie L. Cochran
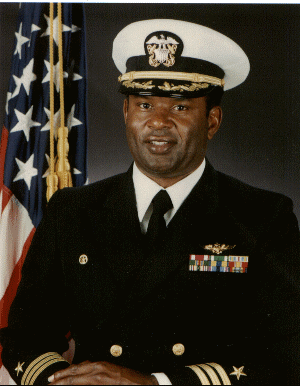
- Official Navy photo of Commander Donnie Cochran, USN
- Born: July 6, 1954 (age 72); Pelham, Georgia, U.S.
- Military career
- Allegiance: United States of America
- Branch: United States Navy
- Service years: 1976–2000
- Rank: Captain (retired)

Donnie L. Cochran is a former United States Navy naval aviator and was the first African-American aviator to be selected to the Flight Demonstration Squadron Blue Angels in 1986. Cochran later assumed command of the Blue Angels in 1994. He is a 2022 inductee to the Georgia Aviation Hall of Fame.

== Personal biography ==
Donnie L. Cochran was born July 6, 1954, on a farm near Pelham, Georgia. Graduated from Savannah State College in June 1976, earning a degree in civil engineering technology and commission in the United States Navy. In September 1985, he was the first African-American pilot selected to fly with the United States Navy Flight Demonstration Squadron, The Blue Angels. In July 1994, he was selected as the first African-American commanding officer and flight leader of the Blue Angels.

== Military biography ==
=== Training and Initial Fleet Tours ===
Cochran completed flight school, earned his Navy “Wings of Gold” in 1978 after completing basic jet training in the T-2C Buckeye, and advanced jet training in the TA-4J Skyhawk. Cochran was assigned to fly the RF-8G Crusader due to his excellent performance during carrier qualification as a student pilot. He was assigned to VFP-63 based at NAS Miramar in San Diego, California. He made his first deployment flying RF-8G on board the USS Nimitz (CVN-68) to the Mediterranean Sea and Indian Ocean. During this deployment, the Iranians took over the US Embassy and the USS Nimitz was diverted to the Indian Ocean. To make room for the Special Forces Helicopters, VFP-63 Detachment 5 was flown to the USS Coral Sea (CV-43) for the remainder of the deployment. By the time Captain Cochran completed his first deployment he and VFP-63 Detachment 5 had completed an around-the-world deployment during a nine-month cruise.

Following his first operational deployment flying the Crusader, the navy began phasing the RF-8G out of service and the F-14A Tomcat was assuming the photoreconnaissance mission. Because of this, Cochran transitioned to the F-14A at VF-124 at NAS Miramar. His first assignment after training in the F-14 was with the Blacklions of Fighter Squadron 213 (VF-213), where he made two deployments on board the USS Enterprise (CVN-65) to the Western Pacific and Indian Ocean. By the time his assignment with VF-213 was completed, he had flown over 2,000 hours and made 469 carrier landings in fighter aircraft. His next assignment was as an instructor pilot at the F-14 Replacement Air Group Squadron (RAG) VF-124.

=== First Blue Angels Tour ===
Shortly after arriving at VF-124 in 1985, Captain Cochran applied for and was selected as a Blue Angels pilot. He was the first African American pilot to fly with the Blue Angels and flew for three seasons (1986-87-88). In 1986, Captain Cochran flew the left wingman position flying the number 3 jet in the A-4F Skyhawk. In January 1986, the navy announced that the Blue Angels would be transitioning from the A-4F to the F/A-18 Hornet. The four diamond pilots were “frozen” in positioned for a year to enhance safety, to accommodate the team's transition to the new F/A-18, and to fly a complete airshow season in the same year. What this meant for the 1986 team, they would get an extra year on the team. For Captain Cochran, it meant another year flying the number 3 jet in 1987 and a normal rotation to the number 4 jet as slot pilot in 1988. During his three years as a demonstration pilot Captain Cochran flew over 1,500 hours and over 240 airshows.

=== Return to the Fleet ===
Following three years of flying with the Blue Angels, Captain Cochran was assigned to the Bounty Hunters of VF-2 for department head tour as the squadron's maintenance officer. Captain Cochran made one deployment on board the USS Ranger (CV-61). Following his department head tour, Captain Cochran was screened to command of an operational F-14 squadron and was selected to attend the Air War College, at Maxwell Air Force Base, Montgomery, Alabama. During his assignment at Air War College, Captain Cochran earned a diploma in International Security and a Masters in Human Resource Management from Troy State University. Following Air War College, Captain Cochran reported for duty as the executive officer (XO) at Fighter Squadron 1 (VF-1) Wolfpack. The squadron made one deployment on board the USS Ranger to the Persian Gulf and flew missions over Southern Iraq enforcing the southern no fly zone. Captain Cochran flew over 24 missions and earned an Air Medal. After 16 months as XO, Cochran assumed command of VF-1 as commanding officer (CO). The Navy began to reduce the number of F-14 Squadrons out of the fleet and VF-1 was disestablished. (Cochran was the last commanding officer of Fighter Squadron 1 the Wolfpack). For this reason, Cochran was reassigned to Fighter Squadron 111 (VF-111) Sundowners for 29 days as XO before assuming command of the squadron as CO. It was during this tour that Captain Cochran applied for, completed an interview process, and was selected as commanding officer and flight leader of the Blue Angels. After completing his commanding officer tour, VF-111 won the Battle Efficiency (E) and Safety (S) as the best F-14 squadron in the United States Pacific Fleet.

=== Return to the Blue Angels ===
In November 1994, Cochran assumed command as the first African American commanding officer and flight leader of the Blue Angels at a ceremony at National Naval Aviation Museum at Naval Air Station Pensacola, Florida. Cochran led the team for 16 months until May 1996.

=== Post Blue Angels Command ===
After leaving the Blue Angels, Cochran served as the commanding officer of the Naval Reserve Officer Training Corps Unit (NROTC), at Florida A & M University with cross-town enrollment with Florida State University from August 1996 until July 1999. Captain Cochran was directly responsible for developing and grooming over 100 future naval officers for the navy and United States Marine Corps.

During his final assignment, he served as the deputy commander of the Navy Recruiting Command, second in command of over 7,000 people at over 1,500 locations around the nation and abroad. Captain Cochran retired from the U.S. Navy with over 24 years of leadership and aviation expertise.

Cochran at the dedication ceremony for the A-4 static display on the Campus of Savannah State University on May 10, 1991. Photo courtesy of Savannah State University, NROTC. On May 10, 1991, Savannah State University dedicated a static display A-4 aircraft on the university's campus in honor of Cochran's achievements. The static display contains an A4 jet painted in the Blue Angel's traditional colors of blue and gold and a dedication plaque with the inscription:

IN HONOR OF COMMANDER DONNIE COCHRAN U.S. NAVY 1976 SAVANNAH STATE COLLEGE/NROTC GRADUATE THE FIRST BLACK NAVAL AVIATOR TO FLY WITH THE BLUE ANGELS FLIGHT DEMONSTRATION TEAM THIS AIRCRAFT IS ON LOAN FROM THE NATIONAL MUSEUM OF NAVAL AVIATION AT PENSACOLA, FLORIDA.

A second plaque was later added which bears the inscription: |IN HONOR OF COMMANDER DONNIE COCHRAN, U.S. NAVY THE FIRST BLACK NAVAL AVIATOR TO COMMAND THE BLUE ANGELS FLIGHT DEMONSTRATION TEAM. In August 2015 Donnie Cochran was honored by Georgia's Governor Nathan Deal in the renaming of the old Pelham's Detention Center to the Donnie Cochran Community Complex and in December 2016 he was recently inducted into the Georgia Military Veteran Hall of Fame.

== Education ==
Cochran earned a civil engineering degree from Savannah State College, now known as Savannah State University, Savannah, Georgia, in 1976, where he was a member of the NROTC program. He is also a graduate of the Air War College in Montgomery, Alabama, and earned a master's degree in human resource management from Troy State University.
