= Savannah State University =

Historically black university in Savannah, Georgia, US

- Former names: Georgia State Industrial College for Colored Youth (1890–1932); Georgia State College (1932–1950); Savannah State College (1950–1996)
- Motto: Lux Et Veritas
- Motto in English: Light and Truth
- Type: Public historically black university
- Established: November 26, 1890; 135 years ago
- Parent institution: University System of Georgia
- Academic affiliations: Space-grant
- Endowment: $10 million
- President: Jermaine Whirl
- Provost: Marcus Cox
- Students: 2,945 (fall 2022)
- Location: Savannah, Georgia, United States; 32°1′30″N 81°3′50″W
- Campus: 401-acre (1,622,789.4 m^{2}), coastal setting
- Newspaper: The Tiger's Roar
- Colors: Burnt orange and reflex blue
- Nickname: Tigers and Lady Tigers
- Sporting affiliations: NCAA Division II – SIAC
- Website: savannahstate.edu
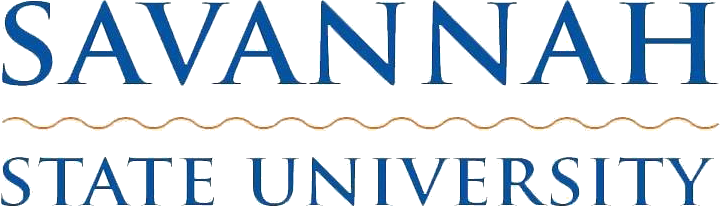

Savannah State University (SSU) is a public historically black university in Savannah, Georgia, United States. It is the oldest historically black public university in the state. The university is a member-school of the Thurgood Marshall College Fund.

Savannah State operates four colleges: College of Business Administration, College of Liberal Arts and Social Sciences, College of Sciences and Technology and the Savannah State University College of Education.

== History ==
SSU's history
1890	Established as Georgia State Industrial College for Colored Youth
1891	Relocated from Athens to Savannah
1921	First female students admitted as campus residents
1928	Became a full four-year degree-granting institution; high school and normal programs were removed
1932	Renamed Georgia State College
1947	Land-grant designation transferred to Fort Valley State College
1950	Renamed Savannah State College
1996	Renamed Savannah State University

=== Establishment ===
Savannah State University was founded as a result of the Second Morrill Land Grant Act of August 30, 1890. The act mandated that southern and border states develop land grant colleges for black students, as their systems were segregated. On November 26, 1890, the Georgia General Assembly passed legislation creating the Georgia State Industrial College for Colored Youth.

A preliminary session of the school was held in the Baxter Street School Building in Athens, where Richard R. Wright Sr. was principal. The college operated there for several months during 1891, before moving to its permanent location in Savannah on October 7, 1891, with Wright as the first president. The school had five faculty members. Its eight students were all graduates of Edmund Asa Ware High School, the first public high school for blacks in Augusta. The campus was built on the former lands of Placentia Plantation, including its colored cemetery.

=== Early years ===
The college awarded its first baccalaureate degree in 1898. In 1921, the first female students were admitted as residents on the campus. In 1928, the college became a full four-year degree-granting institution and ended its high school and normal school programs. Normal schools had been created in the 19th century in many state systems in the United States, after the German model, to educate teachers for elementary school students. With the expansion of towns across the US, and continuing issues in trying to educate four million freedmen and their descendants, there was an urgent need to establish many new schools and to train teachers quickly in the North and the South. States used normal schools for training teachers for primary school grades and sometimes secondary school as well. Normal schools or colleges tended to have two- or three-year programs. Gradually the normal schools were converted to full colleges with four-year curricula, or were left behind.

In 1932, the college became a full member institution of the University System of Georgia and its name was changed to Georgia State College. The college served as Georgia's land-grant institution for African-American students until 1947. The designation was then transferred to Fort Valley State College. In January 1950, the college changed its name to Savannah State College.

=== Modern history ===
With the growth in its graduate and research programs, in 1996 the Board of Regents of the University System of Georgia elevated Savannah State College to the status of state university and the name was changed to Savannah State University.

In 2008, a proposal was made to merge Savannah State University with Armstrong Atlantic State University, but it did not pass. Almost a decade later, Armstrong State would eventually be merged with Georgia Southern University in nearby Statesboro.

Savannah State University is the first institution in the state of Georgia to offer the homeland security degree program. It was the second institution in the University System of Georgia to offer wireless internet connectivity to students throughout the campus.

Notable campus events

The General's Daughter

Portions of the Paramount Pictures movie The General's Daughter were filmed at historic Hill Hall on the campus during the summer of 1997. The film's director Simon West was quoted as saying the campus and Savannah generally "had the most varied and interesting look" to represent the "brooding," "hot and steamy and sticky" "Southern Gothic" impression.

Trading Spaces

The TLC show Trading Spaces filmed an episode ("Savannah: SSU Steppers") on the campus on September 7–9, 2007, as two spaces in the King-Frazier Student Center were transformed by members of Sigma Gamma Rho sorority and Phi Beta Sigma fraternity. The episode premiered on Nov. 17, 2007.

Commissioned II Love

Commissioned II Love, an evangelical Christian campus group, with the assistance of The Alliance Defense Fund's Center for Academic Freedom and the National Legal Foundation filed a federal discrimination lawsuit against Savannah State University and several university employees on March 1, 2007. The student group was recognized as an official organization in 2003 but was later suspended (April 10, 2006) and then expelled on September 11, 2006 after some students complained to university police that its members engaged in activities such as "foot washings" and "baptisms." At the time the university categorized such activities as hazing. On August 24, 2007, a federal judge denied the school's motion to have the case dismissed. The university and the organization reached and agreement allowing the group to re-register as a student organization, with "all rights, benefits and privileges" in February 2008. The settlement did not include any admission of wrongdoing by the university or any monetary award to Commissioned II Love, but ended the dispute between the two parties.

== Academics ==
Savannah State offers undergraduate and graduate degrees through the following colleges:

- College of Business Administration: in addition to degree programmes, the college also offers an MBA program. The college also offers a teaching certification for business majors in a program with Armstrong State University's College of Teacher Education and partners with Armstrong Atlantic to operate the Coastal Georgia Center for Economic Education, a joint program which conducts workshops for area teachers to help meet student economic standards and teachers from the Economics America Program of the Savannah-Chatham school system.
- College of Sciences and Technology: in addition to degree programmes, the college also collaborates with Georgia Tech to offer the Georgia Tech Regional Engineering Program (GREP), the Regents Engineering Transfer Program (RETP) and the Dual degree program.
- College of Liberal Arts and Social Sciences (CLASS)
- College of Education

Students may choose from 23 accredited undergraduate baccalaureate and 5 graduate master's degree programs offered through the university's colleges. The university has developed new partnerships that expand the range of programs and resources for students. Taking advantage of its location on the coast, the university's Marine Biology Department operates two research vessels: the R/V Sea Otter (a 35 ft (11 m) twin diesel vessel owned by NOAA) and the R/V Tiger (a 22 ft (6.7 m) outboard work boat). In the fall of 2007 Savannah State teamed with the U.S. Army Corps of Engineers to offer a new course in environmental regulations, so students can deepen understanding of policy and implementation issues. The program also helps them learn about specific environmental topics.

Savannah State established an honors program for qualified high-achieving and ambitious undergraduate students.

=== Accreditation ===
Accredited by the Commission on Colleges of the Southern Association of Colleges and Schools, Savannah State University also has achieved fully accredited programs in specialized areas of science and engineering:

- Civil engineering technology (Technology Accreditation Commission of the Accreditation Board for Engineering and Technology)
- Electronics engineering technology (Technology Accreditation Commission of the Accreditation Board for Engineering and Technology and National Association of Radio and Telecommunications Engineers, Inc. (NARTE))
- Mechanical engineering technology (Technology Accreditation Commission of the Accreditation Board for Engineering and Technology)

Additionally, the Chemistry department is American Chemical Society (ACS) certified.

The bachelor and masters programs in Social Work are accredited by the (Council on Social Work Education), and the masters in Public Administration by the National Association of Schools of Public Affairs and Administration.

The College of Business Administration is accredited by the Association to Advance Collegiate Schools of Business (AACSB) International, and the Mass Communications Department is accredited by the Accrediting Council on Education in Journalism and Mass Communications (ACEJMC).

CLASS is accredited by the Commission on Colleges of the Southern Association of Colleges and Schools to offer bachelor's degrees as well as the Master of Public Administration, the Master of Science in Urban Studies and Planning and Master of Social Work. The bachelor's degree and Master of Social Work programs are accredited by the Council on Social Work Education. The MPA is accredited by the National Association of Schools of Public Affairs and Administration. The Mass Communications Department is accredited by the ACEJMC.

The Master of Social Work program has been granted accreditation by the Council on Social Work Education (CSWE).

== Administration ==
The Office of Graduate Studies and Sponsored Research coordinates the university's instructional, research and service programs.

=== Academic oversight ===
Oversight is provided by the University System of Georgia, the organizational body that sets goals and dictates general policy to all public educational institutions in the state. The Southern Association of Colleges and Schools (SACS) authorized the university to offer graduate degrees.

=== Funding ===
Savannah State is a public institution, receiving funds from the State of Georgia, tuition, fees, research grants, private scholarship funds (including the Thurgood Marshall Scholarship Fund and the Tom Joyner Foundation), and alumni contributions. The University System of Georgia is governed by the Georgia Board of Regents and dispenses public funds (allocated by the state's legislature) to Savannah State, excluding lottery-funded HOPE Scholarships. The university's endowment was $2,433,508. As of FY05, the university's budget was $42,155,964. In FY06, the university received $7,725,311 in research, instruction, and public service contracts and grants.

== Campus ==
Savannah State University is located approximately 5 miles (8 km) east southeast from the center of Savannah, 250 miles (402 km) from Atlanta, and 120 miles (193 km) from Jacksonville, Florida. The campus is accessible from Interstate 95 and Interstate 16. Spanish moss drapes the dense live oak trees, while palm trees, magnolias, and a wide variety of azaleas, camellias, and other native plants are scattered throughout the 201-acre (813,418.1 m^{2}) marsh-side campus.

Much of the campus is in the Savannah city limits, though portions are in unincorporated areas of Chatham County.

=== Early years ===
The original campus consisted of 86 acres (348,030 m^{2}) and three buildings (Boggs Hall, Parsons Hall and a farmhouse), with 51 acres (206,390 m^{2}) of the land serving as the school's farm. Several of the campus' older buildings were originally constructed by students and faculty members, and display architectural styles from the past century.

=== Historic facilities ===
The Georgia Historical Commission and the Georgia Department of Natural Resources have recognized both the Savannah State campus and Hill Hall as a part of the Georgia Historical Marker Program.

==== Hill Hall ====
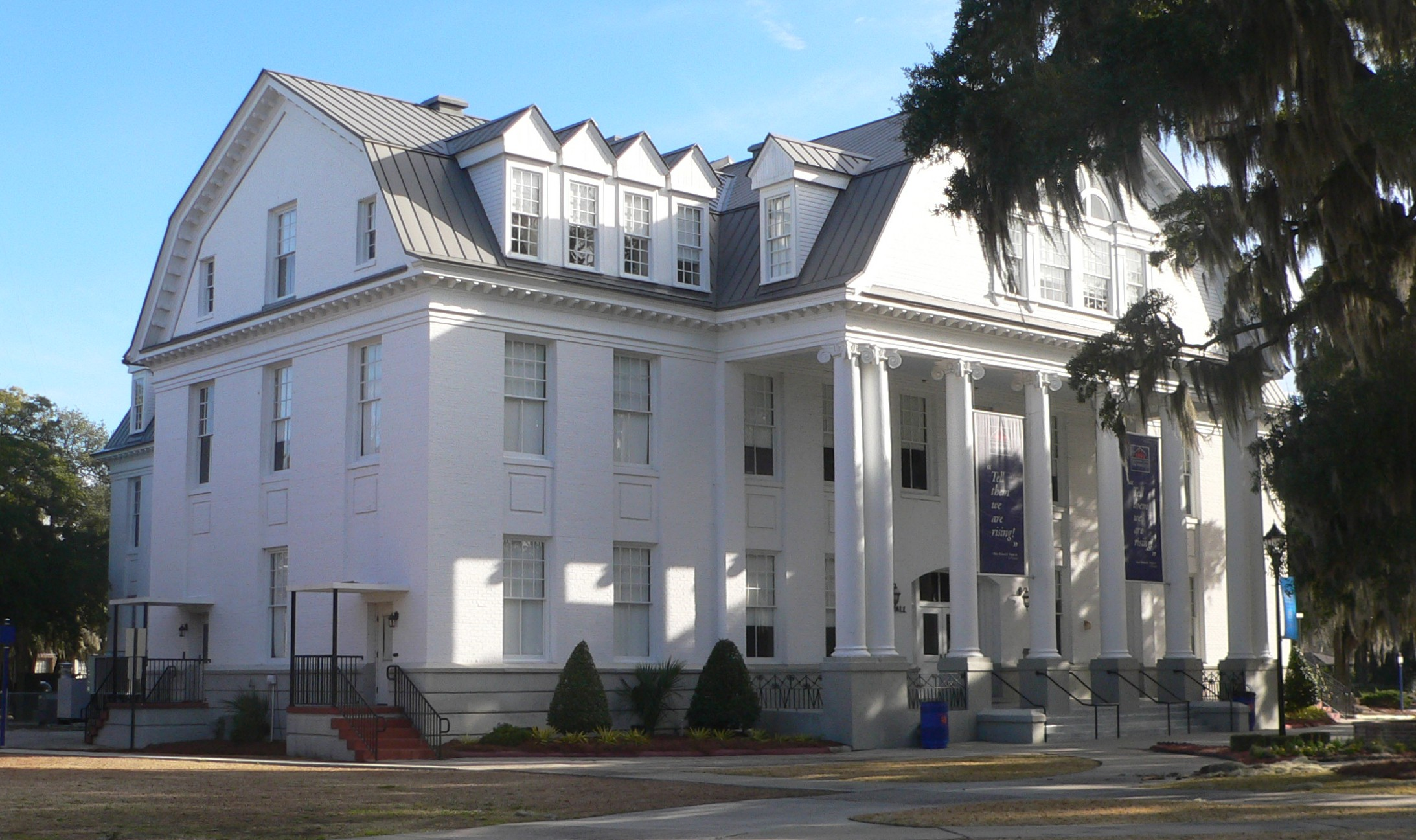
Walter Bernard Hill Hall

- Hill Hall at Savannah State College
- U.S. National Register of Historic Places
- Location: Savannah, Georgia
- Coordinates: 32°01′27″N 81°03′23″W
- Built: 1901
- Architectural style: Classical Revival
- NRHP reference No.: 81000197
- Added to NRHP: 1981

Walter Bernard Hill Hall, built between 1900 and 1901 by students studying manual arts and blacksmithing, was added to the National Register of Historic Places in 1981. The facility had a variety of uses, including a bookstore, student center, male dormitory, and library. Needing too much renovation for continued use, the building was closed in 1996. The university and community created the Hill Hall Restoration Project to raise money for the project. After restoration, the building was reopened in 2008. It houses the university's Enrollment Management Center, a presidential suite, administrative offices, a lecture hall, a banquet room, and a small museum.

=== Athletic facilities ===
CDR Donnie Cochran at the dedication ceremony for the A4 Memorial on the campus of Savannah State University on May 10, 1991.Photo courtesy of Savannah State University, NROTC.

Tiger Arena is the 6,000-seat multi-purpose arena which serves as the home for the university's basketball team and athletic department offices. Ted A. Wright Football Stadium is the home of the university's football team and has an Olympic outdoor track. The 7,500-seat multi-purpose stadium opened in 1967. The track was constructed in 1995.

=== Recent additions ===
On October 15, 2007, Savannah State broke ground on a new academic building which was dedicated on May 1, 2009. It includes 10 classrooms, three lecture rooms, three computer labs, and applied research and observation labs. The building also houses the Africana studies exhibit, the Dean of Humanities and faculty offices, Public Administration/Urban Studies, and the Social Work and Social and Behavioral Sciences departments.

== Student life ==
Undergraduate demographics as of Fall 2023
Race and ethnicity	Total
Black	89%
Hispanic	5%
Two or more races	3%
White	3%
International student	2%
Unknown	1%
Economic diversity
Low-income (Note: The percentage of students who received an income-based federal Pell grant intended for low-income students.)	34%
Affluent (Note: The percentage of students who are a part of the American middle class at the bare minimum.)	60%

The student body consists of approximately 3,800 graduate and undergraduate students, and 385 full-time instructional faculty.

The university offers organized and informal co-curricular activities, including 75 student organizations, leadership workshops, 15 intramural activities, student publications and student internships.

=== Wesleyan Gospel Choir ===
The SSU Wesleyan Gospel Choir was established in 1971. In 2004 the choir completed and released a live album, entitled RLW: "Revelation, Love, & Worship". Members of the Wesleyan Gospel Choir participated in the NBCAHF Inaugural Gospel Explosion competition in 2006 and the International Gospel Retreat, which aired on The Word Network. In 2007 the choir performed at the Dr. Bobby Jones International Gospel Music Industry Retreat, which was also broadcast on The Word Network. The choir performed with Ann Nesby during the 13th annual Savannah Black Heritage Festival.

=== Powerhouse Of The South ===
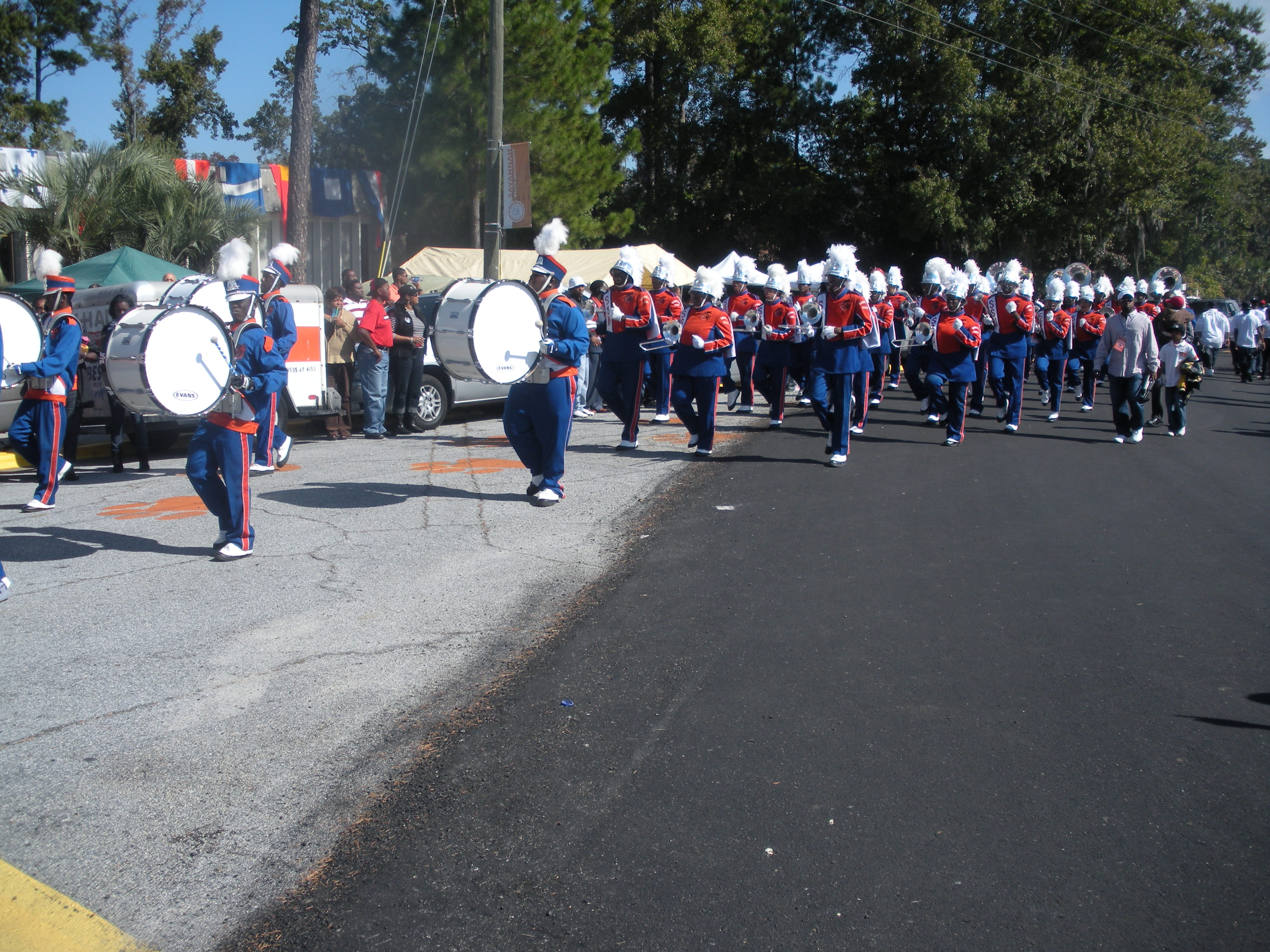
Savannah State University's Marching Band during the 2008 Homecoming celebration

The university band, nicknamed the "Powerhouse of the South", performs during Savannah State football games. They were featured performers in the Honda Battle of the Bands in 2004, 2005, & 2023.

=== National fraternities and sororities ===
All nine of the National Pan-Hellenic Council (NPHC) organizations currently have chapters at Savannah State University. In addition to the NPHC, there are several other national fraternities and sororities registered on campus.

=== Student media ===
==== The Tiger's Roar ====
The Tiger's Roar is the official student-produced newspaper of Savannah State University and provides both a print and online version.

==== WHCJ radio station ====
SSU operates WHCJ (FM) radio, which broadcasts 24 hours a day from the campus, covers all of Chatham County, and can also be heard in Effingham, Bryan, Beaufort, and Liberty counties.

Established in 1975 and known as "the Voice of Savannah State University", WHCJ's current play formats include gospel, jazz, reggae, blues and salsa music, as well as talk shows, commentaries, and cultural enrichment programming.

=== Athletics ===
SSU Athletics

Men's Baseball Basketball Cross county Football Golf Track & field	Women's Basketball Cross county Golf Softball Tennis Track & field Volleyball

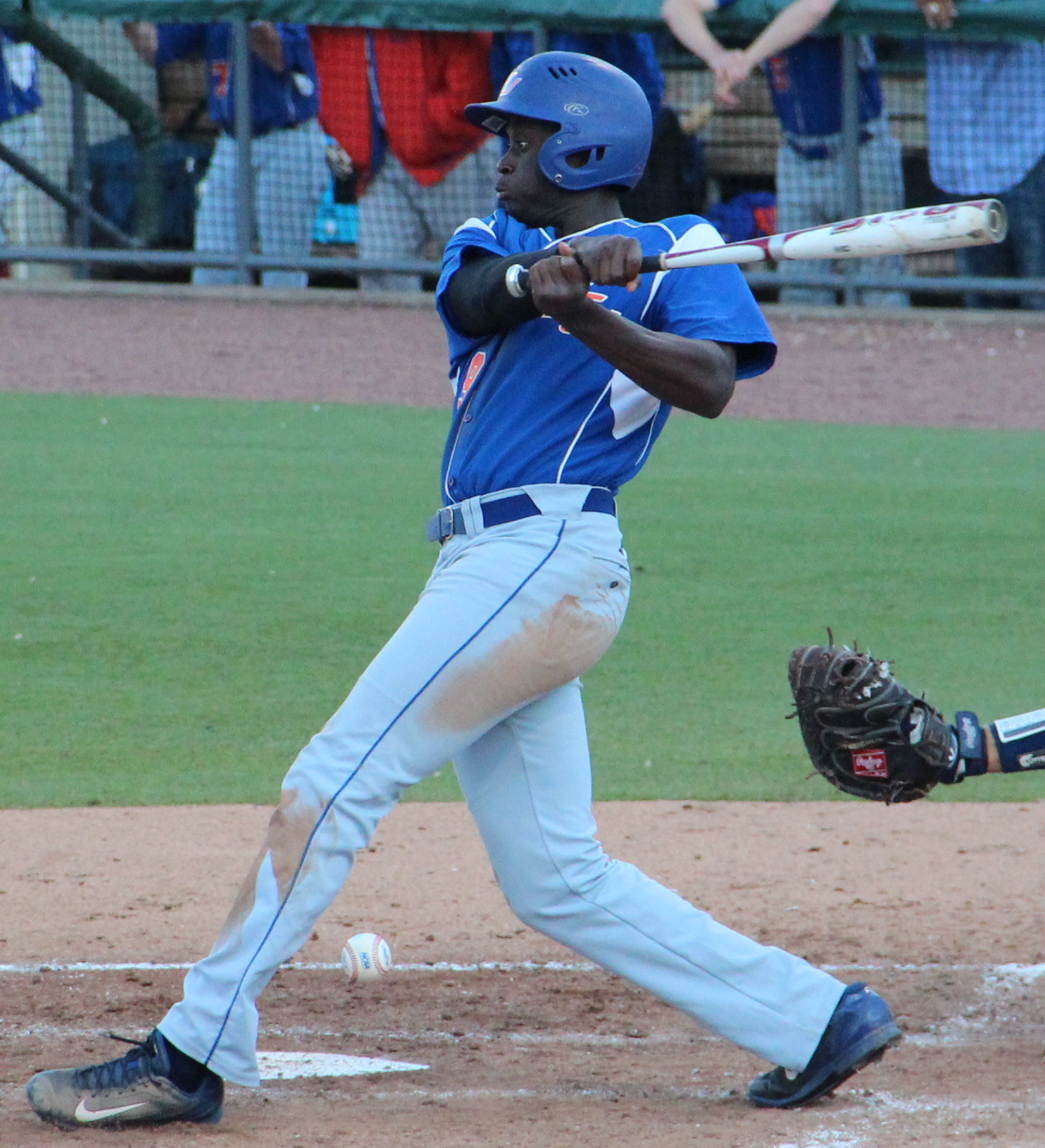
A Savannah State Tigers baseball player swings at a pitch during a 2014 game at Russ Chandler Stadium

The Savannah State Tigers represent the university in college intercollegiate athletics and are administered by the Savannah State University Athletic Department. The department dedicates about $2 million per year for its sports teams and facilities.

Savannah State University holds membership in the National Collegiate Athletic Association (NCAA) Division II as a member of the Southern Intercollegiate Athletic Conference (SIAC) and participates in the following sports: football, baseball, basketball (men and women), cross-country (men and women), tennis (men and women), track and field (men and women), volleyball (women only), golf (men), and softball (women). In April 2017 Savannah State University President Cheryl Dozier announced the school intends to reclassify all athletic programs to Division II The move back to Division II is expected to occur for the 2019-20 academic year. The Georgia school would end its membership in the Mid-Eastern Athletic Conference, which it joined in 2010

The school gained notoriety when they finished the 2004–2005 men's basketball season a winless 0–28, the first Division I team to do so since Prairie View A&M University in 1991–1992. The team's final game (a 49–44 loss to Florida A&M) was covered by several national sports organizations including ESPN.

=== SSU Cheer ===
Savannah State University's competitive cheerleading team became the first team from a HBCU to win a national cheerleading title in February 2017. The 13-member team won a CheerSport National title for their top score routine.

== See also ==
Additional faculty information
For additional information on notable Savannah State University faculty and staff members, you may also want to view articles in the following categories:
- Category:Presidents of Savannah State University
- Category:Savannah State University faculty
- Category:Savannah State Tigers football coaches
- Category:Savannah State Tigers men's basketball coaches

- List of Savannah State University alumni
- List of Savannah State University faculty
  - President of Savannah State University
