= Veblen, South Dakota =

- City
- Location in Marshall County and the state of South Dakota
- Coordinates: 45°51′43″N 97°17′13″W
- Country: United States
- State: South Dakota
- County: Marshall
- Incorporated: 1900

Area
  - Total: 0.31 sq mi (0.81 km^{2})
  - Land: 0.31 sq mi (0.81 km^{2})
  - Water: 0 sq mi (0.00 km^{2})
- Elevation: 1,280 ft (390 m)

Population (2020)
  - Total: 317
  - Density: 1,008.9/sq mi (389.52/km^{2})
- Time zone: UTC-6 (Central (CST))
  - Summer (DST): UTC-5 (CDT)
- ZIP code: 57270
- Area code: 605
- FIPS code: 46-66540
- GNIS feature ID: 1267611

Veblen is a city in Marshall County, South Dakota, United States. The population was 317 at the 2020 census.

Sioux country singer and actor Floyd Red Crow Westerman is buried here at Saint Matthew's Catholic Cemetery.

== History ==
Veblen was laid out in 1900, and named in honor of J. E. Veblen, an early settler.

== Geography ==
According to the United States Census Bureau, the city has a total area of 0.31 square miles (0.80 km^{2}), all land.

== Demographics ==
Historical population
Census	Pop.	Note	%±
1910	173		—
1920	530		206.4%
1930	520		−1.9%
1940	486		−6.5%
1950	476		−2.1%
1960	437		−8.2%
1970	377		−13.7%
1980	368		−2.4%
1990	321		−12.8%
2000	281		−12.5%
2010	531		89.0%
2020	317		−40.3%
U.S. Decennial Census

=== 2020 census ===
As of the 2020 census, Veblen had a population of 317. The median age was 33.6 years, with 30.6% of residents under the age of 18 and 12.9% aged 65 or older. For every 100 females there were 108.6 males, and for every 100 females age 18 and over there were 126.8 males age 18 and over.

0.0% of residents lived in urban areas, while 100.0% lived in rural areas.

There were 118 households in Veblen, of which 39.0% had children under the age of 18 living in them. Of all households, 36.4% were married-couple households, 32.2% were households with a male householder and no spouse or partner present, and 22.0% were households with a female householder and no spouse or partner present. About 29.7% of all households were made up of individuals and 16.1% had someone living alone who was 65 years of age or older.

There were 151 housing units, of which 21.9% were vacant. The homeowner vacancy rate was 3.1% and the rental vacancy rate was 17.8%.

Racial composition as of the 2020 census
Race	Number	Percent
White	107	33.8%
Black or African American	0	0.0%
American Indian and Alaska Native	78	24.6%
Asian	4	1.3%
Native Hawaiian and Other Pacific Islander	0	0.0%
Some other race	47	14.8%
Two or more races	81	25.6%
Hispanic or Latino (of any race)	132	41.6%

=== 2010 census ===
At the 2010 census there were 531 people in 151 households, including 72 families, in the city. The population density was 1,712.9 inhabitants per square mile (661.4/km^{2}). There were 174 housing units at an average density of 561.3 per square mile (216.7/km^{2}). The racial makup of the city was 37.1% White, 0.2% African American, 12.6% Native American, 47.8% from other races, and 2.3% from two or more races. Hispanic or Latino of any race were 52.9%.

Of the 151 households 25.8% had children under the age of 18 living with them, 31.1% were married couples living together, 10.6% had a female householder with no husband present, 6.0% had a male householder with no wife present, and 52.3% were non-families. 33.8% of households were one person and 16.5% were one person aged 65 or older. The average household size was 3.52 and the average family size was 3.18.

The median age was 28.2 years. 15.6% of residents were under the age of 18; 18.9% were between the ages of 18 and 24; 41% were from 25 to 44; 14.5% were from 45 to 64; and 10.2% were 65 or older. The gender makeup of the city was 70.8% male and 29.2% female.

=== 2000 census ===
At the 2000 census there were 281 people in 141 households, including 73 families, in the city. The population density was 915.8 inhabitants per square mile (353.6/km^{2}). There were 167 housing units at an average density of 544.2 per square mile (210.1/km^{2}). The racial makeup of the city was 81.49% White, 15.30% Native American, 2.49% from other races, and 0.71% from two or more races. Hispanic or Latino of any race were 2.85%.

Of the 141 households, 22.0% had children under the age of 18 living with them, 35.5% were married couples living together, 11.3% had a female householder with no husband present, and 48.2% were non-families. 47.5% of households were one person and 29.1% were one person aged 65 or older. The average household size was 1.99 and the average family size was 2.79.

The age distribution was 25.3% under the age of 18, 5.7% from 18 to 24, 18.5% from 25 to 44, 19.9% from 45 to 64, and 30.6% 65 or older. The median age was 45 years. For every 100 females, there were 87.3 males. For every 100 females age 18 and over, there were 81.0 males.

The median household income was $18,583 and the median family income was $20,625. Males had a median income of $31,964 versus $16,250 for females. The per capita income for the city was $12,053. About 25.3% of families and 29.7% of the population were below the poverty line, including 41.9% of those under the age of 18 and 23.2% of those 65 or over.

== Notable people ==
- Arthur Akre, member of the South Dakota House of Representatives
