= Marshall County, South Dakota =

County in South Dakota, United States

- County
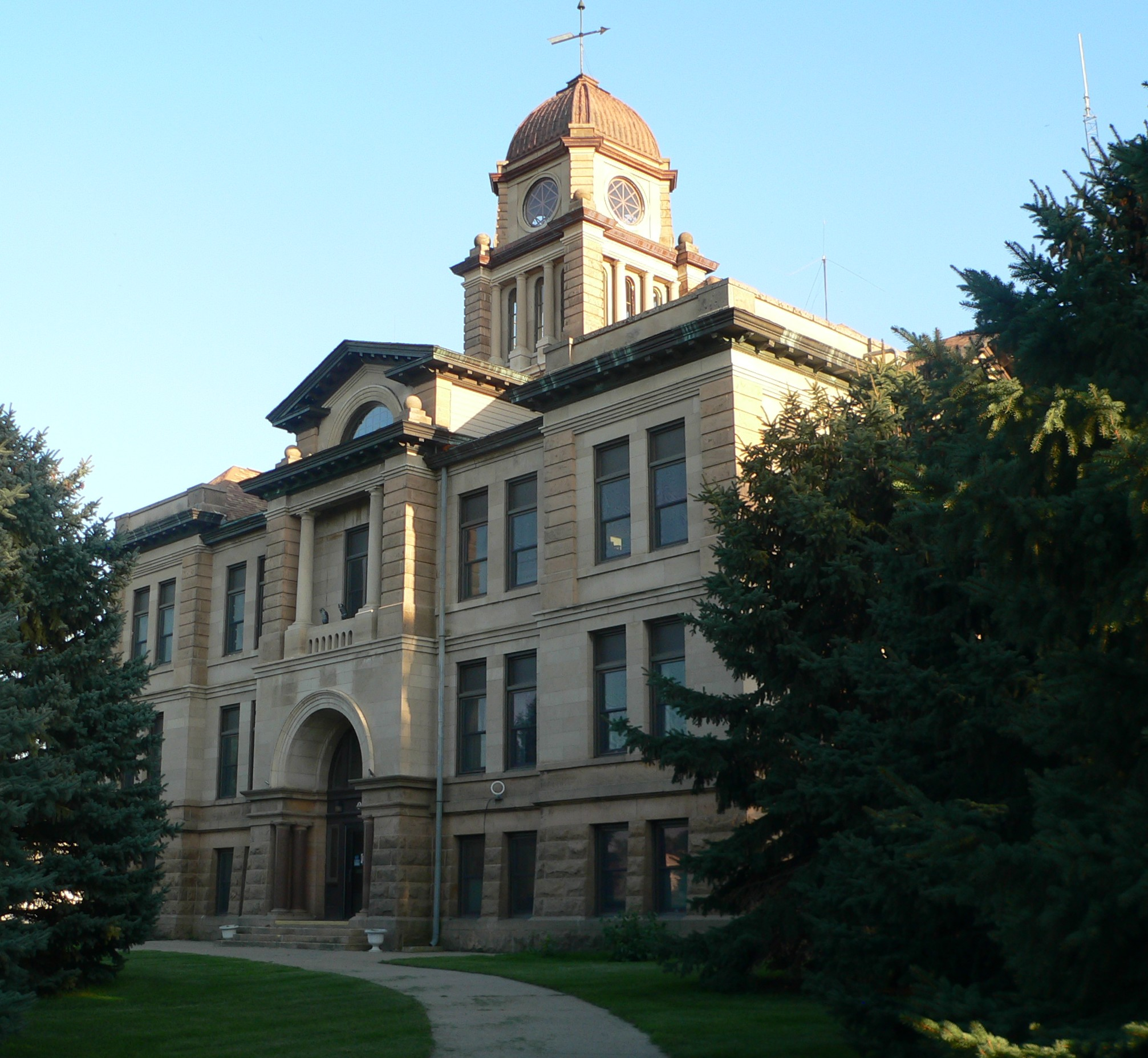
- Marshall County Courthouse in Britton

- Location within the U.S. state of South Dakota
- Coordinates: 45°46′N 97°36′W
- Country: United States
- State: South Dakota
- Founded: 1885
- Named for: Marshall Vincent
- Seat: Britton
- Largest city: Britton

Area
  - Total: 886 sq mi (2,290 km^{2})
  - Land: 838 sq mi (2,170 km^{2})
  - Water: 48 sq mi (120 km^{2}) 5.4%

Population (2020)
  - Total: 4,306
  - Estimate (2025): 4,426 ▲
  - Density: 5.3/sq mi (2.0/km^{2})
- Time zone: UTC−6 (Central)
  - Summer (DST): UTC−5 (CDT)
- Congressional district: At-large
- Website: marshall.sdcounties.org

Marshall County is a county in the U.S. state of South Dakota. As of the 2020 census, the population was 4,306. Its county seat is Britton. The county was created on May 2, 1885, and was named for Marshall Vincent, who homesteaded near Andover, South Dakota.

== Geography ==
Native vegetation based on NRCS soils information

Marshall County lies on the north side of South Dakota. Its north boundary line abuts the south boundary line of the state of North Dakota. Its terrain consists of rolling hills, with numerous lakes and ponds in the SE portion. Its terrain slopes to the northeast, and its highest point is near its SE corner, at 2,034 ft (620 m) ASL.

Marshall County has a total area of 886 square miles (2,290 km^{2}), of which 838 square miles (2,170 km^{2}) is land and 48 square miles (120 km^{2}) (5.4%) is water. The county is drained by the Crow Creek, a tributary of the James River, and the Wild Rice River, a tributary of the Red River of the North. A portion of the Lake Traverse Indian Reservation is located in the eastern part of the county.

=== Major highways ===
- South Dakota Highway 10
- South Dakota Highway 25
- South Dakota Highway 27

=== Protected areas ===
- Abraham State Game Production Area
- Aspen Slough State Game Production Area
- Black Slough State Game Production Area
- Bonham State Game Production Area
- Buffalo Lakes State Game Production Area
- Bullhead State Lakeside Use Area
- Cattail State Game Production Area
- Church State Game Production Area
- Clear Lake State Game Production Area
- Clear Lake State Lakeside Use Area
- Douglas State Game Production Area
- Eden State Game Production Area
- Flat Creek State Game Production Area
- Fort Sisseton Historic State Park
- Fort Sisseton State Game Production Area
- Four Mile-Clubhouse-Barretts State Game Production Area
- Four Mile State Lakeside Use Area
- Hamilton Township State Game Production Area
- Hickman Dam State Game Production Area
- Horeshoe State Game Production Area
- Ivory Tower State Game Production Area
- Knebel State Game Production Area (part)
- Little Cottonwood State Game Production Area
- Lost Lake State Game Production Area
- Nine Mile State Game Production Area
- North Church State Game Production Area
- North Ottertail State Game Production Area
- North Red Iron State Game Production Area
- Renziehausen State Game Production Area (part)
- Rock Crandall State Game Production Area
- Roy Lake State Game Production Area
- Roy Lake State Park
- Schlosser Memorial State Game Production Area
- Sica Hollow State Park (part)
- Sorbell State Game Production Area
- South Red Iron State Game Production Area
- Turtlefoot State Game Production Area
- White Lake State Game Production Area

=== Adjacent counties ===
- Sargent County, North Dakota – north
- Richland County, North Dakota – northeast
- Roberts County – east
- Day County – south
- Brown County – west

== Demographics ==
Historical population
Census	Pop.	Note	%±
1890	4,544		—
1900	5,942		30.8%
1910	8,021		35.0%
1920	9,596		19.6%
1930	9,540		−0.6%
1940	8,880		−6.9%
1950	7,835		−11.8%
1960	6,663		−15.0%
1970	5,965		−10.5%
1980	5,404		−9.4%
1990	4,844		−10.4%
2000	4,576		−5.5%
2010	4,656		1.7%
2020	4,306		−7.5%
2025 (est.)	4,426	▲	2.8%
U.S. Decennial Census

=== 2020 census ===
As of the 2020 census, there were 4,306 people, 1,702 households, and 1,131 families residing in the county. The population density was 5.1 inhabitants per square mile (2.0/km^{2}).

Of the residents, 24.4% were under the age of 18 and 23.4% were 65 years of age or older; the median age was 42.6 years. For every 100 females there were 108.1 males, and for every 100 females age 18 and over there were 110.9 males.

The racial makeup of the county was 84.3% White, 0.2% Black or African American, 7.8% American Indian and Alaska Native, 0.3% Asian, 1.8% from some other race, and 5.7% from two or more races. Hispanic or Latino residents of any race comprised 5.9% of the population.

There were 1,702 households in the county, of which 26.1% had children under the age of 18 living with them and 17.0% had a female householder with no spouse or partner present. About 29.4% of all households were made up of individuals and 15.2% had someone living alone who was 65 years of age or older.

There were 2,394 housing units, of which 28.9% were vacant. Among occupied housing units, 77.1% were owner-occupied and 22.9% were renter-occupied. The homeowner vacancy rate was 1.5% and the rental vacancy rate was 13.1%.

=== 2010 census ===
As of the 2010 census, there were 4,656 people, 1,815 households, and 1,154 families in the county. The population density was 5.6 inhabitants per square mile (2.2/km^{2}). There were 2,534 housing units at an average density of 3.0 units per square mile (1.2 units/km^{2}). The racial makeup of the county was 85.4% white, 7.6% American Indian, 0.2% black or African American, 0.2% Asian, 5.6% from other races, and 1.1% from two or more races. Those of Hispanic or Latino origin made up 6.8% of the population. In terms of ancestry, 45.6% were German, 30.6% were Norwegian, 6.8% were Swedish, 5.8% were Irish, 5.2% were English, and 2.7% were American.

Of the 1,815 households, 24.4% had children under the age of 18 living with them, 52.8% were married couples living together, 6.0% had a female householder with no husband present, 36.4% were non-families, and 31.4% of all households were made up of individuals. The average household size was 2.36 and the average family size was 2.83. The median age was 43.2 years.

The median income for a household in the county was $41,023 and the median income for a family was $56,544. Males had a median income of $31,639 versus $26,737 for females. The per capita income for the county was $22,441. About 9.3% of families and 17.1% of the population were below the poverty line, including 27.6% of those under age 18 and 12.8% of those age 65 or over.

== Communities ==
=== Cities ===
- Britton (county seat)
- Veblen

=== Towns ===
- Eden
- Lake City
- Langford

=== Census-designated place ===
- Clear Lake
- Kidder
- Newport Colony
- Sunset Colony
- Westwood Colony

=== Unincorporated communities ===
- Amherst
- Hillhead
- Marlow
- Newark
- Spain
- West Britton

=== Townships ===
- Buffalo
- Dayton
- Dumarce
- Eden
- Fort
- Hamilton
- Hickman
- La Belle
- Lake
- Lowell
- McKinley
- Miller
- Newark
- Newport
- Nordland
- Pleasant Valley
- Red Iron Lake
- Sisseton
- Stena
- Veblen
- Victor
- Waverly
- Weston
- White
- Wismer

== Politics ==
Marshall County voters have tended to vote Democratic for the past several decades. In 64% of the national elections since 1960, the county selected the Democratic Party candidate.

United States presidential election results for Marshall County, South Dakota
Year	Republican		Democratic		Third party(ies)	
Year	No.	%	No.	%	No.	%
1892	477	43.96%	114	10.51%	494	45.53%
1896	553	43.78%	694	54.95%	16	1.27%
1900	829	51.94%	728	45.61%	39	2.44%
1904	996	67.94%	292	19.92%	178	12.14%
1908	874	59.46%	453	30.82%	143	9.73%
1912	0	0.00%	541	43.07%	715	56.93%
1916	808	45.57%	885	49.92%	80	4.51%
1920	1,557	55.97%	266	9.56%	959	34.47%
1924	1,271	51.54%	190	7.70%	1,005	40.75%
1928	1,858	57.13%	1,315	40.44%	79	2.43%
1932	935	27.13%	2,137	62.01%	374	10.85%
1936	1,105	32.62%	2,220	65.54%	62	1.83%
1940	1,989	50.21%	1,972	49.79%	0	0.00%
1944	1,511	52.57%	1,363	47.43%	0	0.00%
1948	1,419	44.37%	1,710	53.47%	69	2.16%
1952	2,248	66.45%	1,135	33.55%	0	0.00%
1956	1,639	50.06%	1,635	49.94%	0	0.00%
1960	1,704	50.44%	1,674	49.56%	0	0.00%
1964	1,183	36.44%	2,063	63.56%	0	0.00%
1968	1,471	47.01%	1,518	48.51%	140	4.47%
1972	1,500	47.66%	1,646	52.30%	1	0.03%
1976	1,233	41.56%	1,721	58.00%	13	0.44%
1980	1,710	56.98%	1,120	37.32%	171	5.70%
1984	1,529	57.72%	1,111	41.94%	9	0.34%
1988	1,142	45.23%	1,372	54.34%	11	0.44%
1992	810	35.26%	1,056	45.97%	431	18.76%
1996	861	38.33%	1,185	52.76%	200	8.90%
2000	1,097	52.77%	939	45.17%	43	2.07%
2004	1,242	52.54%	1,099	46.49%	23	0.97%
2008	900	41.08%	1,261	57.55%	30	1.37%
2012	889	44.74%	1,061	53.40%	37	1.86%
2016	1,056	54.24%	754	38.73%	137	7.04%
2020	1,287	59.09%	858	39.39%	33	1.52%
2024	1,288	61.07%	782	37.08%	39	1.85%

== See also ==
- National Register of Historic Places listings in Marshall County, South Dakota
