= VF-124 =

Fighter Squadron 124
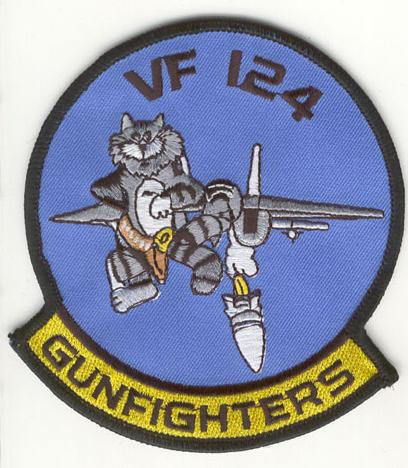
- VF-124 squadron patch
- Founded: 16 August 1948
- Disbanded: 30 September 1994
- Country: United States of America
- Branch: United States Navy
- Type: Fleet replacement squadron
- Garrison/HQ: NAS Miramar
- Nickname(s): Gunfighters; Gunslingers (callsign)
- Engagements: Korean War

Aircraft flown
- Fighter: F4U-4B Corsair; F9F-5 Panther; F-8 Crusader; F-14 Tomcat

Fighter Squadron 124 or VF-124 Gunfighters was a fleet replacement squadron (FRS) of the United States Navy. Originally established on 16 August 1948 as VF-53, it was redesignated VF-124 at NAS Moffett Field on 11 April 1958 due to a need for an increased number of flight training squadrons, itself necessary because of introduction of swept wing fighters into Navy service. In 1961, the squadron relocated to NAS Miramar, California, which would become the U.S. Pacific Fleet's Master Jet Base for fighter aircraft.

The squadron's task as an FRS was the training of pilots for the F-8 Crusader, and later the training of pilots and radar intercept officers for the F-14 Tomcat. The squadron was disestablished on 30 September 1994 and its F-14 FRS mission consolidated with its U.S. Atlantic Fleet counterpart, VF-101, at NAS Oceana, Virginia.

== History ==
=== Korean War ===
VF-53 equipped with F4U-4B Corsairs was assigned to Carrier Air Group 5 aboard USS Valley Forge from 1 May to 1 December 1950 and was one of the first navy squadrons deployed to the Korean War. The squadron deployed again on USS Essex from 26 June 1951 to 25 March 1952. Reequipped with the F9F-5 Panther the squadron deployed on USS Valley Forge from 20 November 1952 to 25 June 1953.

=== Fleet replacement squadron ===
==== F7U Cutlass and F8U / F-8 Crusader ====
When initially redesignated, VF-124 had four missions assigned:

The first was fleet readiness evaluation in the early 1950s of the F7U-3 Cutlass. VF-124 was assigned to go embark the USS Hancock to test the British steam catapult system and then deploy on a Western Pacific (WESTPAC) cruise to Japan. However, the underpowered F7U was deemed to be unsatisfactory for fleet use and was stricken from Naval Air inventory in 1955.

Second, VF-124 conducted initial training of newly winged USN and USMC F-8 Crusader pilots that were recent graduates of the Naval Air Training Command, bringing them to a standard where they were ready to join a fleet fighter squadron (VF or VMF) or light photographic squadron (VFP). VF-124 also conducted refresher training in the F-8 for aviators returning to the Pacific Fleet for department head, squadron executive/commanding officer (XO/CO), carrier air group/carrier air wing commander (CAG) and Marine aircraft group commanding officer (MAG CO) assignments.

Third, the squadron also provided maintenance training on the F-8 for enlisted ground personnel en route to operational fleet squadrons.

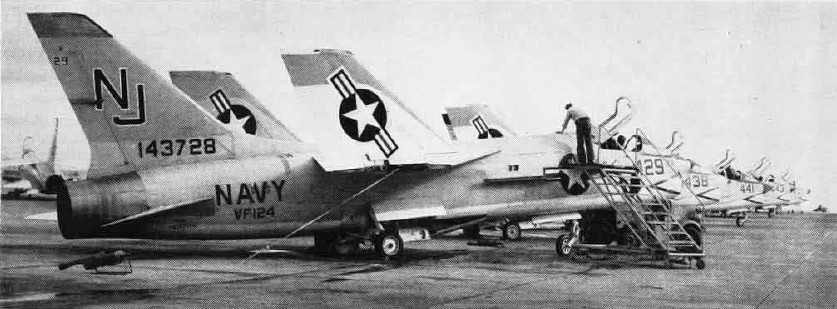
F8U-1s of VF-124 at NAS Miramar in the early 1960s.

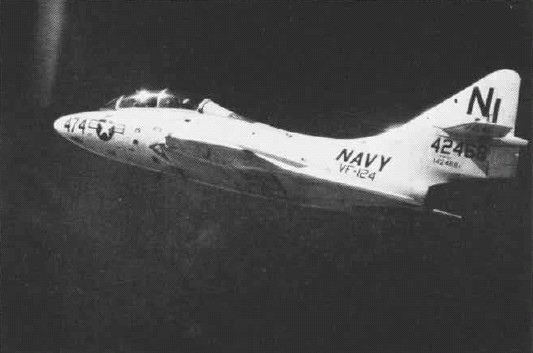
An F9F-8T Cougar from VF-124 in 1959.

The fourth and final mission of VF-124 is often overlooked, but was a crucial part of the training provided by a Fleet Readiness Squadron. In addition to these training roles, VF-124 maintained all of its instructor pilots as combat ready pilots in case of national emergency. Flying the F8U-1, TV-2 and F9F-8T the Gunfighters won the Safety S awards for 1958 and 1959.

After three years at NAS Moffett Field VF-124 moved to NAS Miramar, which became the U.S. Pacific Fleet's master jet base for fighter aircraft. The squadron continued its FRS mission in support of the F-8 and RF-8 Crusader community while a sister squadron, VF-121 assumed the Pacific Fleet FRS role for pilots, NFOs and maintenance personnel operating and maintaining the F-4 Phantom II, also based at NAS Miramar.

==== F-14 Tomcat ====
In 1972, VF-124 became the Pacific Fleet training squadron for the new F-14A Tomcat. VF-124 stopped training F-8 pilots in August 1972 and responsibility for the small number of F-8s left was handed over to VFP-63. VF-124 received their first F-14As on 8 October 1972, and a few days later the two first active fleet F-14A squadrons, VF-1 and VF-2 were established. In December 1973, U.S. Marine Corps officers reported to VF-124 to start training as instructors and to form an initial cadre of USMC flight crews who would operate the F-14 in Marine fighter/attack squadrons (VMFA). USMC involvement with VF-124 continued until 1976 when the Commandant of the Marine Corps decided that the F-14 was too expensive for the USMC to operate and that the Marine Corps would continue to operate the F-4 Phantom II in its fighter/attack squadrons until the F/A-18 Hornet entered service in 1982.

The first set of replacements pilots, NFOs and maintenance personnel trained by VF-124 took to sea in December 1974, flying day and night carrier qualifications of the deck of USS Kitty Hawk.

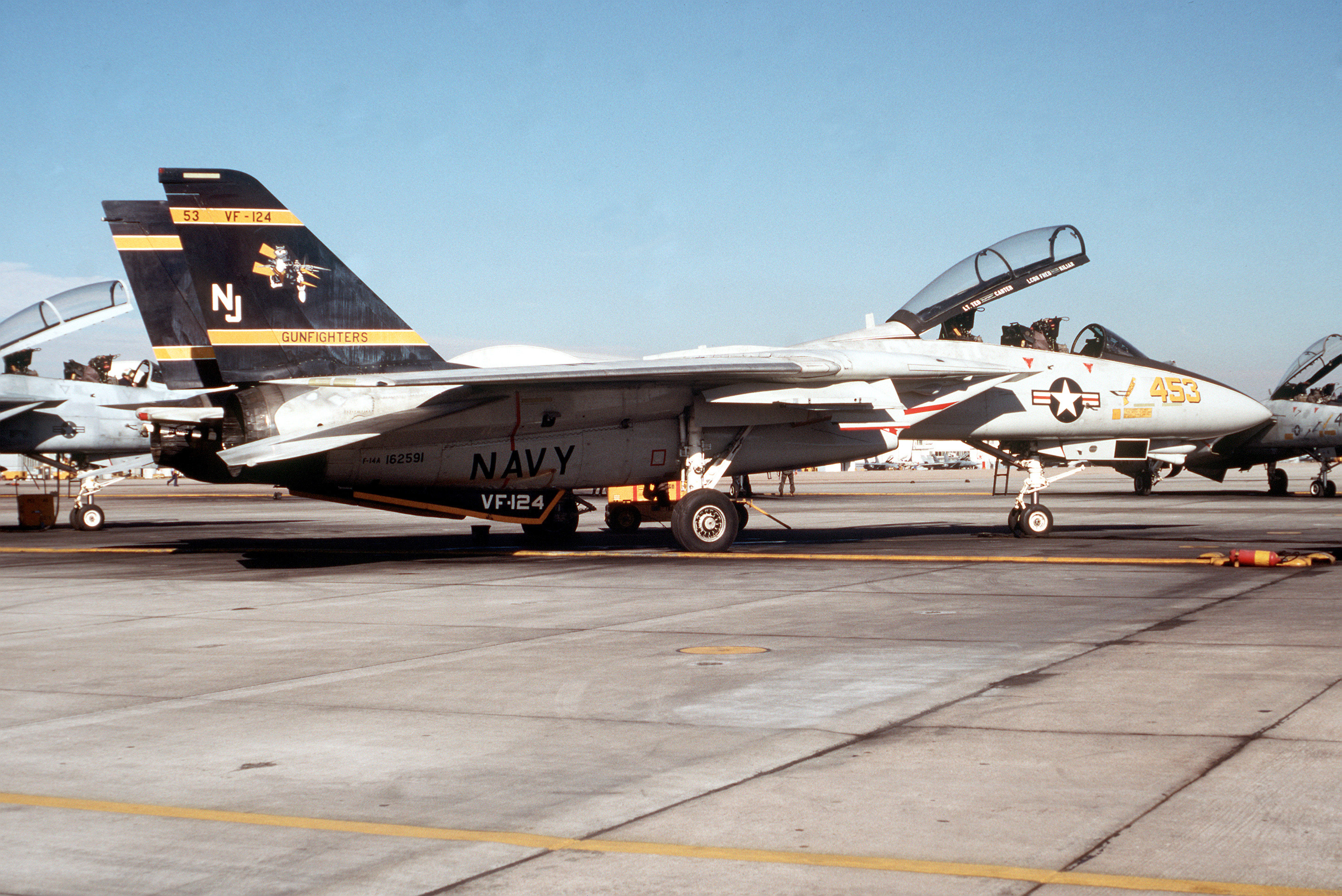
VF-124 F-14A at NAS Miramar

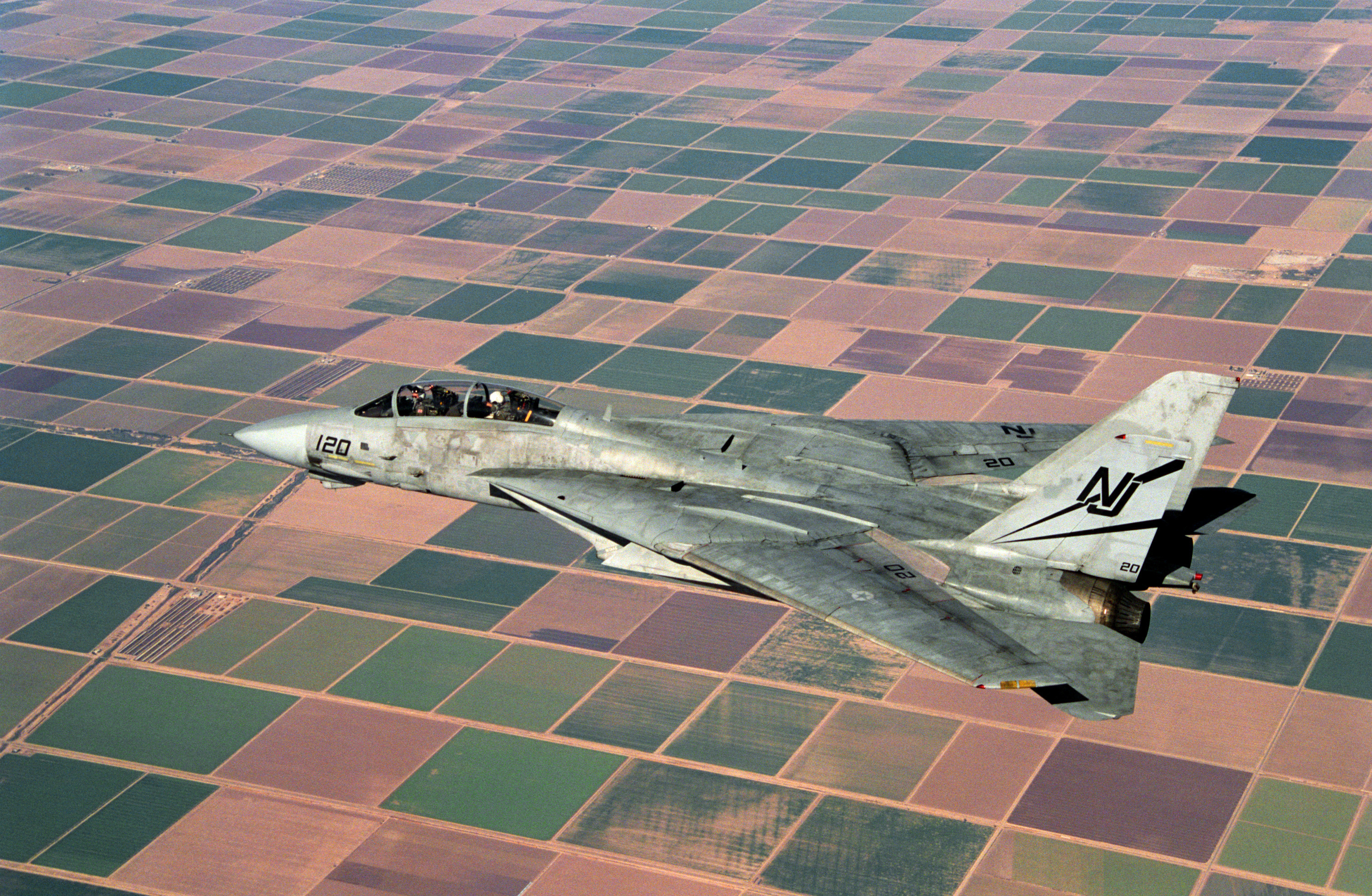
VF-124 F-14A over California in December 1992

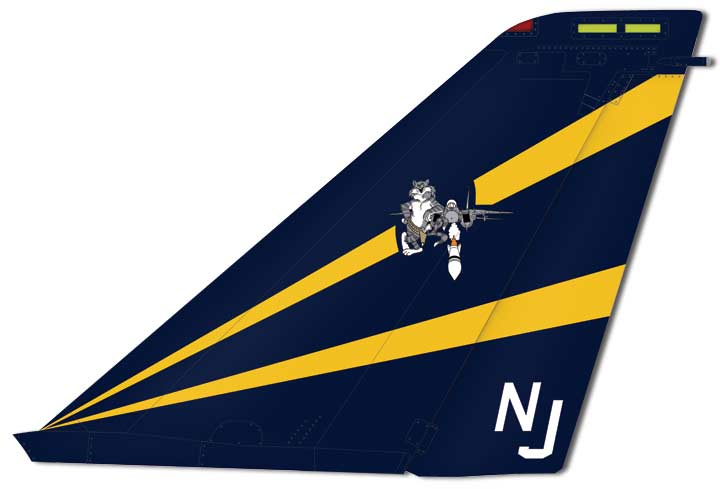
VF-124 F-14 tail markings

In 1976, personnel from the Imperial Iranian Air Force arrived to begin training on the F-14 until the overthrow of the Shah three years later. As a new decade began, the Navy opted to retire its dedicated RA-5C Vigilante and RF-8A reconnaissance aircraft and the role of reconnaissance was introduced to the F-14 community with the Tactical Air Reconnaissance Pod System (TARPS) and VF-124 began to teach air and ground crews how to operate the TARPS pod. By December 1988, VF-124 had trained 1502 aircrew, over 14,400 maintenance personnel and flown over 153,193 flight hours and VF-124 also achieved 124 days without any Foreign Object Damage. VF-124 continued to operate the F-14A while VF-101 began training Atlantic Fleet F-14 crews on the re-engine F-14B Tomcat.

With the introduction of the improved F-14D Super Tomcat, VF-124 was assigned the role of training air and ground personnel on the new aircraft and the first F-14D was accepted on 16 November 1990, with four aircraft undertaking the first fleet F-14D carrier qualifications on board USS Nimitz on 2 October 1991. During its period of service, VF-124 only operated the F-14A Tomcat and the F-14D Super Tomcat, as all F-14B Tomcats were only flown by select Atlantic Fleet fighter squadrons.

On 11 March 1993, a VF-124 F-14 made the final landing on USS Ranger prior to that ship's decommissioning, with Lieutenant Mark A. Garcia and Lieutenant Tim Taylor completing the carrier’s 330,683rd landing.

With the post-Cold War downsizing of the F-14 squadrons in the early 1990s, the Navy's F-14 training squadrons were similarly reduced and VF-124 was disestablished in September 1994. The F-14D was still operated out of former VF-124 spaces for a year, and the unit became VF-101 Det Miramar. Shortly after this, the BRAC-directed transfer of NAS Miramar to the Marine Corps and its redesignation as MCAS Miramar following the BRAC-directed closures of MCAS El Toro, California and MCAS Tustin, California took place.

With the exception of extant Navy F-14 squadrons based in Japan as part of the Forward Deployed Naval Force (FDNF), those F-14s assigned to VX-4 (later VX-9) at NAS Point Mugu, California; VX-23 at NAS Patuxent River, Maryland; NASA's Dryden Research Center at Edwards AFB, California, and VF-201 and VF-202 of the Naval Air Reserve Force at NAS JRB Fort Worth, Texas, all F-14 fleet squadrons at the former NAS Miramar that were not otherwise decommissioned were relocated to NAS Oceana, Virginia, with that base becoming the single site location for the majority of the active duty F-14 fleet until the Tomcat's retirement from the U.S. Navy's inventory in 2006. Concurrent with this move, responsibility for all F-14 training transferred to VF-101.

== See also ==
- History of the United States Navy
- List of inactive United States Navy aircraft squadrons
- List of United States Navy aircraft squadrons
