= Britton, South Dakota =

- City
- Motto: "The View Is Great From Here"
- Location in Marshall County and the state of South Dakota
- Coordinates: 45°47′32″N 97°45′10″W
- Country: United States
- State: South Dakota
- County: Marshall
- Incorporated: 1883

Area
  - Total: 0.73 sq mi (1.89 km^{2})
  - Land: 0.73 sq mi (1.89 km^{2})
  - Water: 0 sq mi (0.00 km^{2})
- Elevation: 1,358 ft (414 m)

Population (2020)
  - Total: 1,215
  - Density: 1,668.9/sq mi (644.35/km^{2})
- Time zone: UTC−6 (Central (CST))
  - Summer (DST): UTC−5 (CDT)
- ZIP code: 57430
- Area code: 605
- FIPS code: 46-07380
- GNIS feature ID: 1267297
- Website: City website

Britton is a city in and the county seat of Marshall County, South Dakota, United States. The population was 1,215 at the 2020 census.

A weekly newspaper, the Britton Journal, is published in Britton.

== History ==
Britton was founded in 1884 as a stop on the Chicago, Milwaukee, St. Paul and Pacific Railroad. In 1885, the town was designated county seat of the newly formed Marshall County. It received its city rights in 1906. The city is named after Isaac Britton, a railroad official.

== Geography ==
According to the United States Census Bureau, the city has a total area of 0.73 square miles (1.89 km^{2}), all land.

=== Climate ===
Climate data for Britton, South Dakota (1991−2020 normals, extremes 1893−present)
Month	Jan	Feb	Mar	Apr	May	Jun	Jul	Aug	Sep	Oct	Nov	Dec	Year
Record high °F (°C)	66 (19)	67 (19)	84 (29)	100 (38)	109 (43)	108 (42)	114 (46)	114 (46)	107 (42)	94 (34)	79 (26)	65 (18)	114 (46)
Mean daily maximum °F (°C)	20.4 (−6.4)	25.3 (−3.7)	38.7 (3.7)	54.7 (12.6)	68.4 (20.2)	77.9 (25.5)	82.5 (28.1)	81.0 (27.2)	72.7 (22.6)	57.3 (14.1)	39.3 (4.1)	25.6 (−3.6)	53.6 (12.0)
Daily mean °F (°C)	10.4 (−12.0)	15.0 (−9.4)	28.2 (−2.1)	42.5 (5.8)	55.6 (13.1)	65.8 (18.8)	70.4 (21.3)	68.5 (20.3)	59.8 (15.4)	45.4 (7.4)	29.3 (−1.5)	16.3 (−8.7)	42.3 (5.7)
Mean daily minimum °F (°C)	0.4 (−17.6)	4.7 (−15.2)	17.6 (−8.0)	30.4 (−0.9)	42.8 (6.0)	53.7 (12.1)	58.3 (14.6)	56.1 (13.4)	47.0 (8.3)	33.6 (0.9)	19.3 (−7.1)	7.1 (−13.8)	30.9 (−0.6)
Record low °F (°C)	−44 (−42)	−42 (−41)	−29 (−34)	−3 (−19)	17 (−8)	30 (−1)	37 (3)	31 (−1)	11 (−12)	−4 (−20)	−24 (−31)	−40 (−40)	−44 (−42)
Average precipitation inches (mm)	0.66 (17)	0.64 (16)	0.87 (22)	1.96 (50)	3.04 (77)	4.13 (105)	4.41 (112)	2.50 (64)	2.56 (65)	2.15 (55)	0.69 (18)	0.66 (17)	24.27 (616)
Average snowfall inches (cm)	8.3 (21)	9.8 (25)	6.1 (15)	5.1 (13)	0.0 (0.0)	0.0 (0.0)	0.0 (0.0)	0.0 (0.0)	0.0 (0.0)	1.2 (3.0)	5.1 (13)	9.8 (25)	45.4 (115)
Average precipitation days (≥ 0.01 in)	5.3	5.3	4.9	7.0	9.6	9.9	9.4	7.6	6.8	6.7	4.7	5.1	82.3
Average snowy days (≥ 0.1 in)	4.7	4.4	3.0	1.5	0.0	0.0	0.0	0.0	0.0	0.6	2.3	4.7	21.2
Source: NOAA

== Demographics ==
Historical population
Census	Pop.	Note	%±
1890	514		—
1900	519		1.0%
1910	901		73.6%
1920	1,105		22.6%
1930	1,312		18.7%
1940	1,500		14.3%
1950	1,430		−4.7%
1960	1,442		0.8%
1970	1,495		3.7%
1980	1,590		6.4%
1990	1,394		−12.3%
2000	1,328		−4.7%
2010	1,241		−6.6%
2020	1,215		−2.1%
U.S. Decennial Census

=== 2020 census ===
As of the 2020 census, Britton had a population of 1,215. The median age was 44.6 years. 21.8% of residents were under the age of 18 and 25.3% of residents were 65 years of age or older. For every 100 females there were 98.9 males, and for every 100 females age 18 and over there were 99.6 males age 18 and over.

0.0% of residents lived in urban areas, while 100.0% lived in rural areas.

There were 522 households in Britton, of which 23.2% had children under the age of 18 living in them. Of all households, 46.9% were married-couple households, 22.8% were households with a male householder and no spouse or partner present, and 21.8% were households with a female householder and no spouse or partner present. About 37.5% of all households were made up of individuals and 19.5% had someone living alone who was 65 years of age or older.

There were 626 housing units, of which 16.6% were vacant. The homeowner vacancy rate was 1.8% and the rental vacancy rate was 15.7%.

Racial composition as of the 2020 census
Race	Number	Percent
White	1,135	93.4%
Black or African American	3	0.2%
American Indian and Alaska Native	16	1.3%
Asian	1	0.1%
Native Hawaiian and Other Pacific Islander	0	0.0%
Some other race	16	1.3%
Two or more races	44	3.6%
Hispanic or Latino (of any race)	32	2.6%

=== 2010 census ===
As of the census of 2010, there were 1,241 people, 574 households, and 313 families living in the city. The population density was 1,700.0 inhabitants per square mile (656.4/km^{2}). There were 658 housing units at an average density of 901.4 per square mile (348.0/km^{2}). The racial makeup of the city was 97.8% White, 0.5% African American, 0.7% Native American, 0.1% Asian, and 0.9% from two or more races. Hispanic or Latino of any race were 1.1% of the population.

There were 574 households, of which 23.0% had children under the age of 18 living with them, 44.6% were married couples living together, 6.1% had a female householder with no husband present, 3.8% had a male householder with no wife present, and 45.5% were non-families. 41.3% of all households were made up of individuals, and 21.7% had someone living alone who was 65 years of age or older. The average household size was 2.06 and the average family size was 2.79.

The median age in the city was 48.6 years. 20.1% of residents were under the age of 18; 6% were between the ages of 18 and 24; 18.7% were from 25 to 44; 27.7% were from 45 to 64; and 27.5% were 65 years of age or older. The gender makeup of the city was 48.7% male and 51.3% female.

=== 2000 census ===
As of the census of 2000, there were 1,328 people, 580 households, and 346 families living in the city. The population density was 1,893.5 inhabitants per square mile (731.1/km^{2}). There were 667 housing units at an average density of 951.0 per square mile (367.2/km^{2}). The racial makeup of the city was 97.82% White, 1.13% Native American, 0.15% Asian, 0.08% from other races, and 0.83% from two or more races. Hispanic or Latino of any race were 0.98% of the population.

There were 580 households, out of which 27.4% had children under the age of 18 living with them, 49.5% were married couples living together, 6.9% had a female householder with no husband present, and 40.2% were non-families. 37.4% of all households were made up of individuals, and 22.9% had someone living alone who was 65 years of age or older. The average household size was 2.18 and the average family size was 2.88.

In the city, the population was spread out, with 22.9% under the age of 18, 5.0% from 18 to 24, 23.2% from 25 to 44, 22.2% from 45 to 64, and 26.7% who were 65 years of age or older. The median age was 44 years. For every 100 females, there were 87.8 males. For every 100 females age 18 and over, there were 82.9 males.

As of 2000 the median income for a household in the city was $31,148, and the median income for a family was $37,639. Males had a median income of $29,931 versus $18,500 for females. The per capita income for the city was $18,327. About 5.7% of families and 8.7% of the population were below the poverty line, including 4.7% of those under age 18 and 16.2% of those age 65 or over.

== Transportation ==
The Dakota, Missouri Valley and Western Railroad provides rail service to Britton.

== Education ==
The Britton-Hecla school district covers Britton. There is one elementary school and one high school on the same premises.

== Notable people ==
- Lyle Bien, U.S. Navy vice admiral
- Frederic J. Brown II, U.S. Army lieutenant general
- Frank Farrar, twenty-fourth Governor of South Dakota.
- Dallas Goedert, NFL tight end for the Philadelphia Eagles.
- Susan Wismer, State Senator and candidate for Governor of South Dakota in 2014
