= President of Savannah State University =

The President of Savannah State University is the chief operating officer of the university. The position is sometimes called the chancellor or rector, at other American colleges and universities. There have been fourteen presidents and five acting presidents in the history of Savannah State University.

List of the presidents of Savannah State University
| Name | Dates | Notes |
|---|---|---|
| Richard R. Wright | 1891–1921 | An American military officer, educator, politician, civil rights advocate, and banking entrepreneur, who served as president from 1891 to 1921. During this term as president enrollment increased from the original 8 students to more than 400 and the curriculum was expanded. |
| Cyrus G. Wiley | 1921–1926 | Wiley was a 1902 graduate of Georgia State Industrial College for Colored Youth. During his term as president the first female students were admitted as boarding students on the campus. |
| Benjamin F. Hubert | 1926–1947 | During his tenure as president the college became a full-time degree granting institution (1928). |
| James A. Colston | 1947–1949 | During his term as president Savannah State became accredited by the Southern Association of Colleges and Schools (SACS). and the college's land-grant status was transferred to Fort Valley State College (1949). |
| Timothy Meyers | 1949 | Acting President |
| William K. Payne | 1949–1963 | The college received its first accreditation by the Southern Association of Colleges and Schools and the name was changed to Savannah State College during his tenure. |
| Howard Jordan Jr. | 1963–1971 | The first master's degree program was developed at a Savannah college during his tenure. |
| Prince A. Jackson Jr. | 1971–1978 | As the second alumnus to become president of Savannah State (Cyrus G. Wiley was the first), he was responsible for the establishment of the Naval Reserve Officer Training Corps and WHCJ at Savannah State, and the institutionalization of the Title III program. |
| Clyde W. Hall | 1978–1980 | Acting President |
| Wendell G. Rayburn | 1980–1988 | His administration implemented the Desegregation Plan mandated by the Georgia Board of Regents and he led the institution through the first major building program since the 1970s. |
| Wiley S. Bolden | 1988–1989 | Acting President |
| William E. Gardner Jr. | 1989–1991 | His tenure as president saw unprecedented enrollment growth (13 percent) for the college and he successfully led the College to SACS accreditation. Additionally, he developed a plan to reestablish a teacher certification program at the college. |
| Annette K. Brock | 1991–1993 | Acting President |
| John T. Wolfe Jr. | 1993–1997 | During his tenure the Board of Regents of the University System of Georgia granted the school university status (1996) and the institution was renamed Savannah State University (1996). |
| Carlton E. Brown | 1997–2006 | The eleventh president of Savannah State University. |
| Julius Scott | 2007 | Acting President |
| Earl G. Yarbrough Sr. | 2007–2011 | Former president of Savannah State University. ^{[A]} |
| Cheryl Davenport Dozier | 2011–2019 | Former President of Savannah State University.^{[B]} |
| Kimberly Ballard-Washington | 2019–2023 | Former president of Savannah State University. |
| Cynthia Robinson Alexander | 2023–present | Interim president |

== Notes ==
A. On April 19, 2011 the Georgia Board of Regents for the University System of Georgia voted not renew Dr. Earl Yarbrough's annual contract as president of the university.
B. Cheryl Davenport Dozier was named as acting president of the university on April 21, 2011. The Georgia Board of Regents named Dr. Dozier the permanent president on May 9, 2012.
