= Mary L. Smith (educator) =

American educator (1936–2020)

Mary Levi Smith

11th President of Kentucky State University
- In office October 30, 1991 – June 30, 1998
- Preceded by: John T. Wolfe Jr.
- Succeeded by: George Reid

Personal details
- Born: Mary Levi; 1936; Hazlehurst, Mississippi, U.S.
- Died: November 28, 2020; Frankfort, Kentucky, U.S.
- Spouse: LeRoy Smith
- Occupation: Educator, academic administrator

Mary Levi Smith (née Mary Levi; 1936 – November 28, 2020) was an American educator who served as the 11th president of Kentucky State University (KSU) from 1991 to 1998. She was the first female president of KSU and the second woman to lead a state university in Kentucky.

Smith began working at KSU in 1970, becoming an assistant professor in 1974 and the dean of the College of Applied Sciences in 1983. In 1988, she was appointed as the vice president for academic affairs, and became interim president of KSU after the resignation of Raymond Burse. She was not selected for the permanent position, but the new president, John T. Wolfe Jr., faced charges of financial misconduct and resigned in October 1991. Smith assumed the duties of the presidency and was officially appointed as president less than two weeks later. She served as president of KSU for almost seven years and retired in 1998. She also went by the name Mary Levi Smith–Stowe.

== Education and early career ==
Smith was born in Mississippi in 1936. She earned a bachelor's degree in 1957 from Jackson State University. In 1964, she obtained a master's degree in education from the University of Kentucky, where she would also earn the Doctor of Education degree in 1980.

Smith taught in public schools between 1957 and 1966, and was a reading instructor at Tuskegee Institute in Tuskegee, Alabama.

== Kentucky State University career ==
In 1970, Smith moved to Frankfort, Kentucky, with her husband LeRoy Smith, who was hired as a football coach at Kentucky State University (KSU), a public historically black university. She was hired to work with KSU faculty to implement classroom integration, and became an assistant professor of education in 1974. She became the acting chair of the Division of Education, Human Resources and Technology at KSU in 1981, and was appointed as dean of the College of Applied Sciences at KSU in 1983. She remained in the position until July 1988, when she became KSU's vice president for academic affairs.

A controversy emerged in October 1988 after Philip Chandler II, dean of the College of Arts and Sciences, criticized Smith for a memo in which she rejected his chosen candidate for a department chair vacancy and recommended giving preference to "a minority with a Ph.D. in English". Chandler, who called the memo racist, was suspended and barred from campus by university president Raymond Burse, pending an investigation by the university's board of regents. The board voted to reinstate Chandler while unanimously expressing support for Smith and noting that the memo was consistent with the university's affirmative action policies; Chandler later resigned in protest of Burse's actions in December 1988.

The board of regents announced in March 1989, that Smith would become the interim president of KSU upon Burse's scheduled resignation the following month. Smith, whose position as vice president for academic affairs put her in line for the position as interim president, said she was surprised by the announcement. She was confirmed as interim president on April 19, 1989. Smith began her term by attempting to address grievances from university employees who had been unhappy with Burse's management; she was later credited with boosting morale among faculty members. In January 1990, Smith was named as one of seven semifinalists, and the only female semifinalist, for the permanent position. She was not among the three finalists selected by the board, who ultimately selected John T. Wolfe Jr., then–provost and vice president for academic affairs at Bowie State University. Her interim presidency ended when Wolfe's term began on July 1, 1990, and the board of regents appointed her as a special assistant to Wolfe later that month.

Wolfe's presidency was tumultuous, and on October 7, 1991, the board charged him with financial misconduct and transferred the ability to approve the university's expenditures to Smith. Upon Wolfe's sudden resignation on October 18, Smith assumed the duties of the presidency, and was considered a top contender for the permanent post. On October 30, the board officially named her as president of KSU in a 6–3 vote, with the dissenters not being personally opposed to Smith but rather expressing desire for a nationwide search. Smith's appointment made her the first woman to serve as president of KSU, and the second woman president of any state university in Kentucky.

=== Presidency ===
Smith was formally inaugurated as the 11th president of KSU on May 9, 1992, during the university's commencement ceremonies. As president, she served on the newly established statewide Task Force on Higher Education, which examined reform of Kentucky's universities, and she chaired the Commission on Higher Education Institutional Efficiency and Cooperation, which advised Governor Paul E. Patton on the potential for interactive distance learning via television or the Internet.

In April 1997, Smith announced her plans to retire the following year, when her contract was set to expire in June 1998. She was succeeded as president by George Reid, then–senior vice president at Benedict College in Columbia, South Carolina.

== Awards ==
Smith received the YWCA's Women of Achievement Award in 1990. She was inducted in the University of Kentucky's Hall of Distinguished Alumni in 1995, and received the Achievement Award from the Kentucky Association of Blacks in Higher Education that same year.

== Death and legacy ==
Smith died on November 28, 2020, at the age of 84. The Mary L. Smith Clock Tower on KSU's campus was named in her honor.
