= Soul of Reason =

Radio show

- Running time: 30 min
- Country of origin: United States
- Language: English
- Home station: WNYU-FM
- Hosted by: Roscoe Brown
- Original release: 1971 – 1986
- Audio format: FM radio

Soul of Reason was a talk radio show focused on African American arts and culture, hosted by Roscoe Brown from 1971 to 1986 on WNYU-FM, with rebroadcast on WNBC and at times WNBC-FM.

== Guests ==
Guest lists
Year	Guest	Guest Description
1970	Cudsville, Donald	President of the Harlem Urban Development Corporation (HUDC)
1971-10-26	Moses, Gil	Director of the Broadway Play Ain't Supposed to Die a Natural Death
1973-01-08	Walker, Jim	Book editor and Advertising Manager for Black Creation Magazine
1973-01-14	Fortune, Dr. Hilda	Professor of Sociology at York College of the City University of New York
1973-03-25	Gunn, Bill	Playwright and director of the Black Picture Show
1973-06-19	Dorsey, Carolyn	Instructor at the NYU School of Education and Fellow at the NYU Institute of Afro-American Affairs
1973-07-15	White, Louis	Director of the Wiltwyck Schools
1973-07-29	Davis, Nat	Assistant director for the Community-Oriented Drug Education Program of Harlem Teams for Self-Help
1973-08-19	Murray, James P.	Film critic, film editor of the New York Amsterdam News, and editor of Black Creation
1973-08-26	Barron, Allan	Publisher of Black Sports magazine
1973-09-16	Russell, Harvey C.	Vice president of PepsiCo and Co-Chairman of the Congressional Black Caucus Dinner
1973-09-25	Finch, Connie	Sophomore NYU Student involved in Black Student Affairs
1973-11-13	Anglada, Mario	Executive director of ASPIRA of New York
1973-11-20	Covington, William	Special assistant to the project director of the Urban League's Youth Enrichment Program
1973-11-27	Taylor, Cecil	Musician
1973-12-04	Clarke, Richard	Founder of Richard Clarke Associates
1973-12-11	Lacy, Diane	Coordinator of the National Conference on Drug Abuse
1973-12-16	Williams, Charles	Assistant Council of the NAACP Legal Defense Fund
1973-12-18	Cintron, Umberto	Executive producer of the Television Show, Realidades
1973-12-30	Figueroa, Jose-Angel	Poet and author of the book East 110th Street
1974	Patterson, Basil	Vice chairman of the Democratic National Committee.
1974-01-14	Bertram, Cliff	Track Coach at New York University
1974-01-21	Salamu, Mashujaa A. and Khaliq Abdul Al Rouf	Musicians from the Group Ensemble, Al Salaam
1974-01-22	Harvin, Al	Sports Writer for The New York Times
1974-01-28	King, Woodie, Jr.	Playwright, director, and producer of the musical The Prodigal Sister
1974-01-30	Feinstein, Dr. Alan and Ambassador Ogbu	Author of African Revolutionary: The Life and Times of Nigeria's Aminu Kano and the Ambassador of Nigeria
1974-02-05	Boyd, Dr. Robert	Associate professor of dentistry and chairman of the minority recruitment committee at the Brookdale Dental Center for the NYU College of Dentistry
1974-03-12	Sullivan, Maxine	Singer
1974-03-19	Christmas, Dr. June	Commissioner for New York City's Department of Mental Health and Mental Retardation
1974-03-26	Capers, Virginia	Actress in the Musical Raisin
1974-04-16	Williams, Mary Lou	Jazz pianist
1974-04-23	Patterson, Basil	Vice chairman of the Democratic National Committee
1974-04-30	Turman, Glynn and Loretta Green	Actor and actress from the Broadway Play What the Wine-Sellers Buy
1974-05-14	Kemp, Emme	Singer and Composer
1974-05-21	White, Dr. Herbert L.	Testing specialist and the director of the executive unit of the Rep Program of the New York City Department of Personnel
1974-06-04	Williams, Bob	Founder of the Sports Foundation and the director of community programs for the New York City Bicentennial Corporation
1974-06-05	Holloman, Dr. John	President of the New York City Health and Hospitals Corporation
1974-06-26	Cowell, Stanley	Pianist and a producer at Strata East Records
1974-07-17	Martin, Bob	Director of Communications for the Capital Formation Corporation
1974-07-24	Davis, Robert	Assistant commissioner for the New York City Agency for Child Development
1974-08-06	Green, Essie	Social Services Research Specialist
1974-08-11	Kennedy, Scott	Professor of speech and drama at Brooklyn College and author of the book In Search of African Theatre
1974-08-13	Higgins, Chester, Jr.	Photographer
1974-08-20	Williams, Bob and Ronald Lee Gaudreau	Executive vice president of the New York City Bicentennial Corporation, and the director of Community Programs for the New York City Bicentennial Corporation
1974-08-27	Killens, John O.	Author of the Historic Novel Youngblood
1974-09-04	Mitchem, Dr. John	Chairman of the Department of Compensatory Programs at Baruch College of the City University of New York
1974-09-10	Pinero, Miguel	Playwright and author of Short Eyes
1974-09-17	Meminger, Dean	American basketball player of the New York Knicks and the Atlanta Hawks
1974-09-24	Broughton, Modeen and Cheryl Goggins	Coordinator and assistant coordinator of the Congressional Black Caucus Dinner
1974-10-02	Neal, James	Representative from National Artists Coalition, Inc.
1974-10-09	Gidron, Dick	Business owner of Dick Gidron Cadillacs
1974-10-09	Sandler, Joan	Executive director of the Black Theatre Alliance
1974-10-30	Weathers, Diane and Camille Billops	Co-editor of and contributor to Black Creation Magazine and faculty member of the Art Departments at Rutgers University and the City University of New York
1974-11-20	Brown, Courtney	New York State Division of Human Rights
1974-11-26	Artist, Ruth	Interior decorator
1974-12-03	Bryant, Linda	Director of the Just Above Midtown Gallery
1974-12-10	Mays, Charles and Herb Douglas	Director of the Black Athletes Hall of Frame, and vice president of Shefflin Corporation and chairman of the board of the Black Athletes Hall of Fame
1974-12-11	Jeffries, Dr. Leonard	Director of Black studies at the City College of New York
1974-12-17	Goodwin, Steven	Investment executive and investment counselor at Hayden Stone & Company
1975	Bailey, Peter	Associate editor of Black Enterprise Magazine
1975	Harris, Diane, Frances Gibson, and William Kornblum	Public Involvement assistant, recreation specialist, and a member of the planning board for the Gateway National Recreation Area
1975-02-18	Jordan, Richard	Director of national urban services for the Boys Club of America
1975-02-25	Kornblum, William, Herb Cables, and Frances Gibson	Representatives from the Gateway National Recreational Center of the National Park Service
1975-03-01	Zollner, Joy	Representative from the Organization RAINS (Relief for Africans in Need in the Sahel)
1975-03-11	Edley, Christopher	Executive director of the United Negro College Fund
1975-03-26	Wright, Samuel	Councilman for 26th Council District in Brooklyn
1975-04-08	Toote, Dr. Gloria	Assistant secretary of the United States Department of Housing and Urban Development
1975-04-09	Yancy, Joe	Track athlete and the co-founder of the New York Pioneer Club
1975-04-14	Gourdine, Simon	Deputy commissioner for the National Basketball Association
1975-04-22	Alexander, Jesse and Fred Hill	YMCA representatives
1975-04-23	Lewis, Ed and Marcia Gillespie	Publisher and editor of Essence magazine
1975-04-29	Williams, John A.	Professor of English at LaGuardia Community College of the City University of New York and author of Mothersill and the Foxes
1975-05-13	Hinds, Lennox	National director of the National Conference of Black Lawyers
1975-05-14	Loney, Dr. Roderick	Chairman of the Academic Development Division at Medgar Evers College of the City University of New York
1975-05-28	Holloman, Dr. John	President of the New York City Health and Hospitals Corporation
1975-06-11	Ward, Douglas Turner	Director of the Negro Ensemble Company and producer of First Breeze of Summer
1975-06-17	Batchelor, Ron	Executive director of Broad Jump
1975-06-24	Archer, Lee	Director of equal opportunity of affairs of the General Foods Corporation and chairman of the North Street Capital Corporation
1975-07-01	Bullins, Ed	Author of The Taking of Miss Janie
1975-07-15	King, Angela	Social affairs officer of the United Nations
1975-07-16	Jones, Martha and Diane Lacey	Public relations director of the Women's Action Alliance, and special assistant to the president of the New York City Health and Hospitals Corporation
1975-08-05	Hamilton, Dr. Charles	Political scientist and president of the Metropolitan Applied Research Center
1975-08-12	Younger, Eddie	Athlete, representative from the New York City Department of Recreation, and a board member for the Harlem Professional, Inc.
1975-09-02	Maynard, Joan	Executive director of the Society for the Preservation of Weeksville and Bedford-Stuyvesant History
1975-09-09	Taylor, Emory	Director of the Harlem Opera Society
1975-09-17	Wright, Dr. Stephen	Vice president of the College Entrance Examination Board
1975-09-23	Harris, Richard and Sergeant James Hargrove	President of the Vulcan Society and president of The Guardians Association
1975-09-23	Sparks, George and William Alston	Grand Master of the King George Grand Lodge and publisher of the Long Island Courier
1975-10-01	Dempsey, Ellen, Robert Williams, and Florence Jackson	Two representatives from the New York City Bicentennial Corporation and the director of social studies for New York City Board of Education
1975-10-15	Lewis, Jerry and Marion Bondurant	Executive director and assistant director of development for the National Medical Fellowships
1975-10-29	Thomas, Franklin	President of the Bedford Stuyvesant Restoration Corporation
1975-10-29	Rainford, Patricia Luces	Associate director of the Bronx Municipal Hospital Center
1975-11-11	Barron, Allan	Publisher of Black Sports magazine
1975-11-12	Goodwin, Steven	Investment counselor and option specialist for U.S. Option International, Inc.
1975-11-12	Gayle, Addison	Writer, critic and associate professor of English at Baruch College of the City University of New York
1975-12-10	Furman, Roger	Playwright and director of the New Heritage Repertory Theatre in Harlem
1976-01-07	Clark, Sam	Radio Personality and producer of the Record Black Americans
1976-01-07	Frazier, Cliff	Administrator of Third World Cinema
1976-01-13	Coombs, Orde	Author and critic
1976-01-14	Carr, Ivory	Assistant director of Ambulatory Care at Brooklyn Jewish Hospital and Medical Center
1976-01-21	Bullock, Kathleen, Mark Millander, and Terry Smith	Students from the New York City Executive High School Intern Program
1976-02-04	Wallace, Robert E.	Executive director of the National Interagency Council on Smoking and Health
1976-02-04	Hutson, Jean Blackwell	Chief of the Schomburg Center for research in Black Culture
1976-02-18	Barnes, Arthur	President of the New York Urban Coalition
1976-03-03	Suggs, Dr. Dolores	Assistant to the Dean of Student Affairs at the New York University College of Dentistry
1976-03-23	Armstead-Johnson, Dr. Helen	Director of the Afro-American Theater Museum and professor of English at York College of the City University of New York
1976-04-28	White, Dr. Herbert	Representative from the New York City Department of Personnel
1976-05-11	Walker, Dr. Wyatt T.	Canaan Baptist Church of Harlem
1976-05-26	Bailey, Peter	Executive director of the Black Theatre Alliance
1976-06-01	Moore, Bob and Jean Carrie Bond	Representatives from The Council on Interracial Books for Children and the Foundation for Change
1976-06-29	Patterson, Pat and Fatima Shaik	Editor-at-large at Black Enterprise Magazine, staff member of the Institute of Afro-American Affairs at NYU and Coordinator for the AEJ Summer Journalism Program
1976-06-30	Greaves, William	Independent filmmaker and producer of From These Roots
1976-06-30	Brown, Howard	Medical director of The New York Times and assistant professor of Clinical Medicine at New York University
1976-06-30	Patterson, John, Jr.	President of the South Bronx Economic Development Corporation
1976-07-07	Morris, Horace	Executive director of the New York Urban League
1976-07-13	Wein, Joyce	Associate producer of Newport in New York Jazz Festival
1976-08-11	Dinkins, David	Chairman for the Council of Black Elected Democrats of New York State
1976-09-21	Webb, Dr. Arnold	Executive director of the Division of Educational Planning and Support for the New York City Board of Education
1976-09-26	Carter, Dr. Ralph D.	Assistant professor of History at Livingston College of Rutgers University
1976-10-12	Patterson, Pat	Editor-at-large at Black Enterprise Magazine and instructor from the Association for Journalism's Summer Institute for Minorities
1976-10-20	Robeson, Paul, Jr.	Head of the Paul Robeson Archives
1976-10-26	Bondurant, Marion, Dr. Beny J. Primm, and Clementine Butts	Director of development, co-chairperson, and benefit committee chairperson from National Medical Fellowships, Inc.
1976-10-27	Holloman, Dr. J. L. S.	President of the New York City Health and Hospital Corporation
1976-11-02	Florence Jackson, Carol Banks, and Robert Williams	Director for the Center for the Humanities and the Arts of the New York City Board of Education, staff member of NYU's Institute of Afro-American Affairs, and the director of community affairs for the New York City Bicentennial Corporation
1976-11-30	Herring, Leonard	Public relations specialist for the film Sounder Part 2
1976-12-07	Pigatt, Anderson	Sculptor
1976-12-14	Lynch, Dr. Hollis	Professor of history for the Institute of African Studies at Columbia University
1976-12-28	Gutman, Dr. Herbert	Professor and author of the Black Family in Slavery and Freedom
1977	Rodgers, Rod	Choreographer and director of the Rod Rodgers Dance Company
1977	Saidy, Jay, Bakari Sidibe, and Sam Kinte	Journalist for the Gambian News Bulletin, minister of cultural affairs, and the Gambian cousin of author Alex Haley
1977	McDougald, Drew	Director of the Queens Branch of the New York Urban League and Carlisle Towery and executive director of the Greater Jamaica Development Corporation
1977	McIntyre, Diane	Choreographer for the Negro Ensemble Company's production of The Great MacDaddy and founder of the Company, Sounds and Motion
1977-01-04	Perkins, William Eric and Eric Foner	Professor from Temple University, and professor from City College of the City University of New York
1977-01-06	Basil Patterson	Vice chairman of the Democratic National Committee
1977-01-12	Sutton, Honorable Percy E.	Borough President of Manhattan
1977-01-12	Alston, Dr. Lester	Clinical psychologist and associate professor of education at Baruch College of the City University of New York
1977-01-19	Deas, Dr. Gerald	Physician from the Department of Internal Medicine at Jamaica Hospital
1977-02-09	Olugebefula, Dr. Ademola and Jean Taylor	Vice president of the national board of directors and executive Secretary of the National Conference of Artists
1977-02-22	Ward, Willie and Howard Scheffey	President, and past president and chairman of the board of the New York City Black Policemen's Organization The Guardians
1977-03-01	French, Arthur	Performer in the Negro Ensemble Company's Play Brownsville Raid
1977-03-08	Burns, Dr. Haywood	Associate professor of law at the New York University School of Law
1977-03-16	Jackson, Florence	Director for the Center for the Humanities and Arts for the New York City Board of Education
1977-03-22	Cooper, Jocelyn and Patricia Dempsey	Coordinator of Foods and Nutrition of the Council Against Poverty and the Community Development Agency, and the deputy director of Food-Stamp Alert
1977-03-30	Robinson, David	Representative from United Harlem Growth, Inc.
1977-03-30	Goldman, Cathy and James Hill	Representatives from the New York City School Breakfast Committee
1977-04-05	Barnes, Arthur	President of the New York Urban Coalition
1977-04-12	Perkins, Joseph	Director of the Mid-Manhattan Branch of the NAACP's "Operation Rebound Project"
1977-05-03	Williams, Mary Lou and Peter O'Brien	Jazz pianist and producer
1977-05-04	Montgomery, Barbara	Actress from La MaMa Experimental Theatre Club's Macbeth
1977-05-10	Stewart, Ellen	La MaMa Experimental Theatre Club
1977-05-21	Carr, Ivory	Director of the outpatient department at the Jewish Hospital and Medical Center of Brooklyn
1977-06-01	Killens, John O.	Author of The Resurrection of Alexander Pushkin
1977-06-15	Stewart, Ruth Ann	Assistant Curator for the Schomburg Center for research in Black Culture of the New York Public Library
1977-06-21	Rowe, Billy and John Procope	Journalist, and the publisher of NY Amsterdam News
1977-06-22	Ford, Connie	Executive director of the Police Athletic League
1977-07-05	Jones, Duane	Executive director of the Black Theatre Alliance
1977-07-20	X	Roberts, Lillian—Associate director of District Council #37
1977-07-20	Barron, Allan	Editor and publisher of Black Sports magazine
1977-07-28	Rhoden, John, Romare Bearden, and Larry Wilson	Sculptor, artist, and a representative from Philip Morris, Inc.
1977-08-09	Jackson Christmas, Dr. June	Commissioner of Mental Health Services in New York City
1977-08-23	Thompson, Dr. Leon	Director of education activities for the New York Philharmonic
1977-08-30	Grymes, Sandra	North East Regional director for Planned Parenthood Federation, Inc.
1977-09-06	Patterson, Jamelle and Dianne McDonald	Founder of the Patterson School, and an instructor at the Patterson School
1977-09-13	Byer, Lavenia, Jeanette Fields, and Andrew Henderson	Coordinator, chairperson and consultant from the Freedom Funds United Foundation
1977-09-20	Williams, Franklin	President of the Phelps-Stokes Fund and former United States Ambassador to Ghana
1977-09-22	Lenior, Henry and Livingston Francis	Group vice president of the YMCA of Greater New York and the executive director of the Harlem YMCA
1977-09-22	Henderson, Butler T.	Executive director of the Earl Warren Legal Training Program of the NAACP's Legal Defense and Education Fund
1977-09-29	Webb, Dr. Arnold	Executive director of the Division of Education of New York City's Board of Education
1977-10-06	Williams, Charles T. "Chuck"	Vice president of the Schenley Affiliated Brands Corporation and member of the board for the Jackie Robinson Foundation
1977-10-13	Jordan, Richard	Director of the Urban Services Division of the Boys Clubs of America
1977-10-25	Turner, Robert	Firefighter and president of the Vulcan Society
1977-11-03	Barnes, Arthur and Reverend Frederick E. Dennard	President of the Urban Coalition and executive director of Harlem Interfaith Counseling Service
1977-11-03	Dempsey, Ellen and Charlotte Frank	Dempsey, Ellen and Charlotte Frank—Project Coordinator for the New York City Bicentennial Corporation and a Representative from the New York City Board of Education "Scholars Series"
1977-11-17	Lynch, Professor Hollis	Political scientist and African history specialist from Columbia University
1977-12-01	Huggins, Dr. Nathan	Professor of history at Columbia University and author of Black Odyssey
1977-12-18	Higginsen, Vy	Founder and publisher of Unique New York Magazine
1978	Davis, Gordon	Commissioner of Parks and Recreation for the City of New York
1978	Jones, Robert Earle	Actor, athlete, scholar, and patron of the arts
1978	Butts, Dr. Hugh	Director of the Bronx Psychiatric Center
1978	Presley, Calvin	Executive director of Opportunities Industrialization Center, Inc.
1978-01-19	Wilkins, Roger	Urban affairs columnist for The New York Times
1978-01-19	Chance, Cathy	Special assistant for urban affairs at the Metropolitan Museum of Art
1978-06-08	Huggins, Dr. Nathan	Professor of history at Columbia University and author of Black Odyssey
