= Industrial technology =

Use of technology to increase the efficiency of production

Industrial technology is the use of engineering and manufacturing technology to make production faster, simpler, and more efficient. The industrial technology field employs creative and technically proficient individuals who can help a company achieve efficient and profitable productivity.

Industrial technology programs typically include instruction in optimization theory, human factors, organizational behavior, industrial processes, industrial planning procedures, computer applications, and report and presentation preparation.

Planning and designing manufacturing processes and equipment is the main aspect of being an industrial technologist. An industrial technologist is often responsible for implementing certain designs and processes.

== Accreditation and certification ==
The USA-based Association of Technology, Management, and Applied Engineering (ATMAE), accredits selected collegiate programs in Industrial Technology in the USA. An instructor or graduate of an Industrial Technology program may choose to become a Certified Technology Manager (CTM) by sitting for a rigorous exam administered by ATMAE covering Production Planning & Control, Safety, Quality, and Management/Supervision.

ATMAE program accreditation is recognized by the Council for Higher Education Accreditation (CHEA) for accrediting Industrial Technology programs. CHEA recognizes ATMAE in the U.S. for accrediting associate, baccalaureate, and master's degree programs in technology, applied technology, engineering technology, and technology-related disciplines delivered by national or regional accredited institutions in the United States.(2011) Industrial technology is also one of the largest industries used.

== Knowledge base ==
"A career in industrial technology typically entails formal education from an accredited college or university. Opportunities are available to professionals with all levels of education. Those who hold associate degrees typically qualify for the entry-level technician and technologist positions, such as in the maintenance and operation of machinery. Bachelor's degree-holders could fill management and engineering positions, such as plant manager, production supervisor and quality systems engineering technologist. A graduate degree in industrial technology could qualify individuals for jobs in research, teaching and upper-level management".

Industrial Technology includes wide-ranging subject matter and could be viewed as an amalgamation of industrial engineering and business topics with a focus on practicality and management of technical systems with less focus on actual engineering of those systems.

Typical curriculum at a four-year university might include courses on manufacturing process, technology and impact on society, mechanical and electronic systems, quality assurance and control, materials science, packaging, production and operations management, and manufacturing facility planning and design. In addition, the Industrial Technologist may have exposure to more vocational-style education in the form of courses on CNC manufacturing, welding, and other tools-of-the-trade in manufacturing.

== Industrial technologist ==
Industrial technology program graduates obtain a majority of positions which are applied engineering and/or management oriented. Since "industrial technologist" is not a common job title in the United States, the actual bachelor's degree or associate degree earned by the individual is obscured by the job title he/she receives. Typical job titles for industrial technologists having a bachelor's degree include quality systems engineer, manufacturing engineer, industrial engineer, plant manager, production supervisor, etc. Typical job titles for industrial technologists having a two-year associate degree include project technologist, manufacturing technologist, process technologist, etc.

A technologist curriculum may focus or specialize in a certain technical area of study. Examples of this includes electronics, manufacturing, construction, graphics, automation/robotics, CADD, nanotechnology, aviation, etc.

== Technological development in industry ==
A major subject of study is technological development in industry. This has been defined as:

- the introduction of new tools and techniques for performing given tasks in production, distribution, data processing (etc.);
- the mechanization of the production process, or the achievement of a state of greater autonomy of technical production systems from human control, responsibility, or intervention;
- changes in the nature and level of integration of technical production systems, or enhanced interdependence;
- the development, utilization, and application of new scientific ideas, concepts, and information in production and other processes; and
- enhancement of technical performance capabilities, or increase in the efficiency of tools, equipment, and techniques in performing given tasks.

Studies in this area often employ a multi-disciplinary research methodology and shade off into the wider analysis of business and economic growth (development, performance). The studies are often based on a mixture of industrial field research and desk-based data analysis and aim to be of interest and use to practitioners in business management and investment (etc.) as well as academics. In engineering, construction, textiles, food and drugs, chemicals and petroleum, and other industries, the focus has been on not only the nature and factors facilitating and hampering the introduction and utilization of new technologies but also the impact of new technologies on the production organization (etc.) of firms and various social and other wider aspects of the technological development process.

How and When Technological development in industry Performed :

1. Technological Processes based always on (Material, Equipment, Human skills and operating circumstances.
2. So, If any of these parameters changed, we have to re-calibrate this technology to match the designed product.
3. This re-calibration can't be considered as a technology change because industrial technology is not more than an Engineering guide to achieve the required specification of the designed product.
4. To calibrate any industrial technology, we should make a documented copy of manufacturing experiments until matching the final product specifications based on original technology, new changed parameters and scientific basics.
5. Finally, documentation of the new change should be done to the original industrial technology for that new case as a new addition.
6. Any application of industrial technology for 1st time or after a long time stop, Technology processes should be tested by a primary samples triers as a Re-calibration process.
