= Benjamin Hubert =

Benjamin Hubert may refer to:

- Benjamin F. Hubert, president of Georgia State Industrial College for Colored Youth
- Benjamin Hubert (designer), British industrial designer
