= Kimberly Ballard-Washington =

American lawyer and academic administrator

14th President of Savannah State University
- In office May 13, 2021 – 2023
- Preceded by: Cheryl Dozier
- Succeeded by: Cynthia Robinson Alexander (interim)

Personal details
- Born: Montezuma, Georgia, U.S.
- Children: 2
- Education: University of Georgia; Texas Southern University

Kimberly Ballard-Washington is an American lawyer and academic administrator who served as the 14th president of Savannah State University from 2019 to 2023.

== Life ==
Ballard-Washington was born and raised in Montezuma, Georgia. She earned a B.A. from the University of Georgia. She completed a J.D. at the Thurgood Marshall School of Law.

At Valdosta State University, Ballard-Washington was an assistant to the president for legal affairs and director of its equal opportunity programs. She was an associate director for legal affairs of the University of Georgia. She was an associate vice chancellor for legal affairs at the University System of Georgia. In 2013, she served as the interim president of Fort Valley State University before serving in the same role at Albany State University. On July 1, 2019, Ballard-Washington became the interim president of Savannah State University, succeeding Cheryl Dozier. She became president on May 13, 2021. She resigned in 2023 and was succeeded by interim president Cynthia Robinson Alexander.

Ballard-Washington is married and has two daughters.
