= Roscoe C. Brown Jr. =

Tuskegee airman (1922–2016)

Roscoe Brown
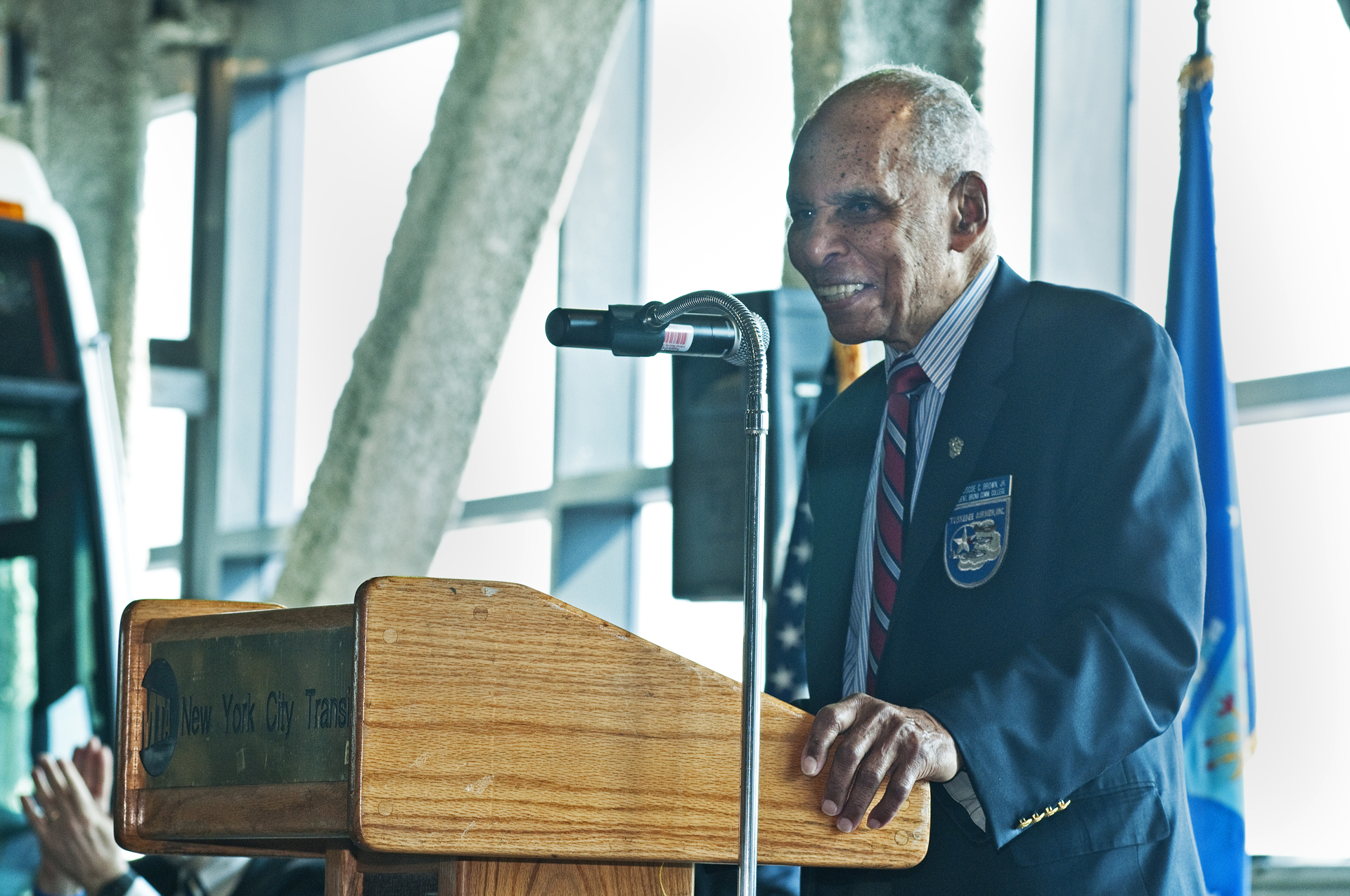
- Brown speaks at the dedication of the Tuskegee Airmen Bus Depot of MTA Regional Bus.
- Born: March 9, 1922; Washington, D.C., US
- Died: July 2, 2016 (aged 94); Bronx, New York, US
- Military career
- Allegiance: United States
- Branch: Army Air Corps
- Rank: Captain
- Unit: 100th Fighter Squadron of the 332nd Fighter Group
- Conflict: World War II
- Awards: Distinguished Flying Cross

Dr. Roscoe Conkling Brown Jr. (March 9, 1922 – July 2, 2016) was one of the Tuskegee Airmen and a squadron commander of the 100th Fighter Squadron of the 332nd Fighter Group.

== Early life ==
Brown was born in Washington, D.C., in 1922. His mother, Vivian I. Kemp was a teacher and his father, Roscoe C. Brown Sr. (1884–1963), was a Howard University trained dentist and an official in the United States Public Health Service who was born as George Brown and had changed his name to honor Roscoe Conkling, a strong supporter of the rights of African Americans during Reconstruction. In 1932, his father would become the chief of the Office of Negro Health Work. During World War II, Brown, Sr. was a member of Franklin Roosevelt's "Black Cabinet", the Federal Council of Negro Affairs.

Brown graduated from Springfield College, Springfield, Massachusetts, where he was valedictorian of the Class of 1943.

== Tuskegee Airman ==
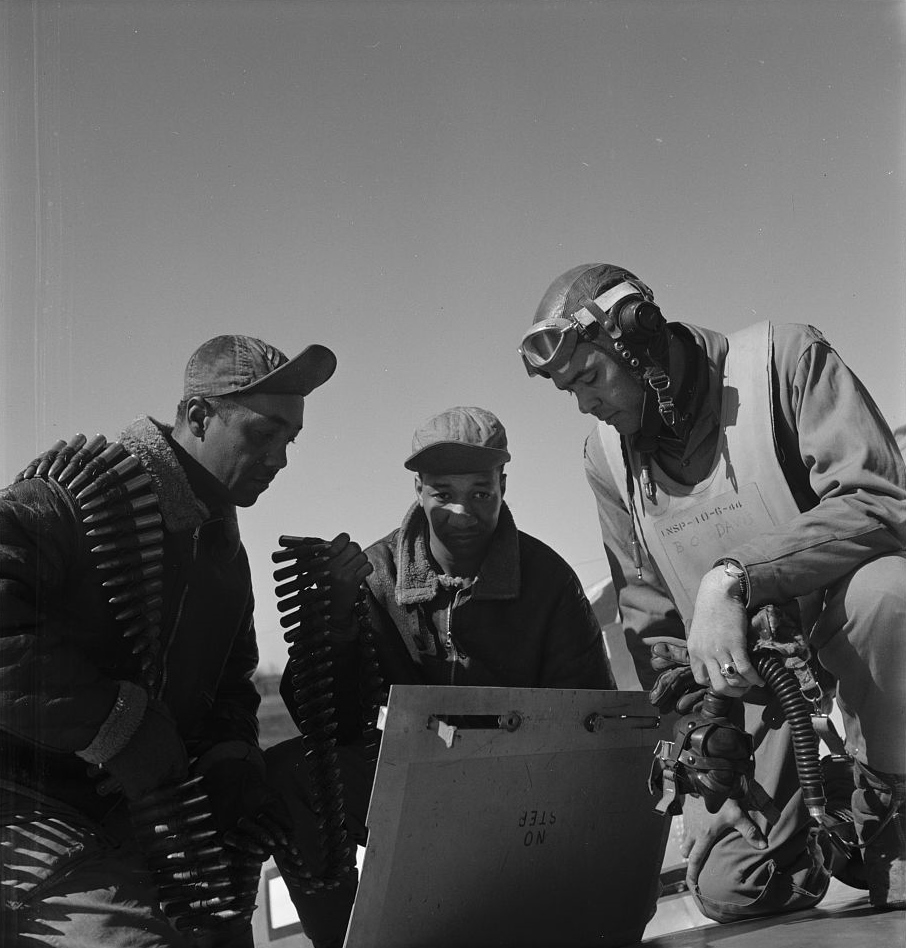
(L-R) Tuskegee Airmen Roscoe C. Brown, Marcellus G. Smith, and Benjamin O. Davis

He joined the U.S. Army, and graduated from the Tuskegee Flight School on March 12, 1944, as member of class 44-C-SE

During combat with the U.S. Army Air Forces in Europe during World War II, he served as a flight leader and operations officer in the 100th Fighter Squadron of the 332nd Fighter Group. On a March 24, 1945, mission to Berlin, Captain Brown shot down a German Me 262 jet fighter, becoming the first 15th Air Force pilot to shoot down a jet. On March 31, he downed a Fw 190 fighter. He was awarded the Distinguished Flying Cross.

He was appointed commander in June 1945, which was after VE Day (May 8, 1945).

== Academic career ==
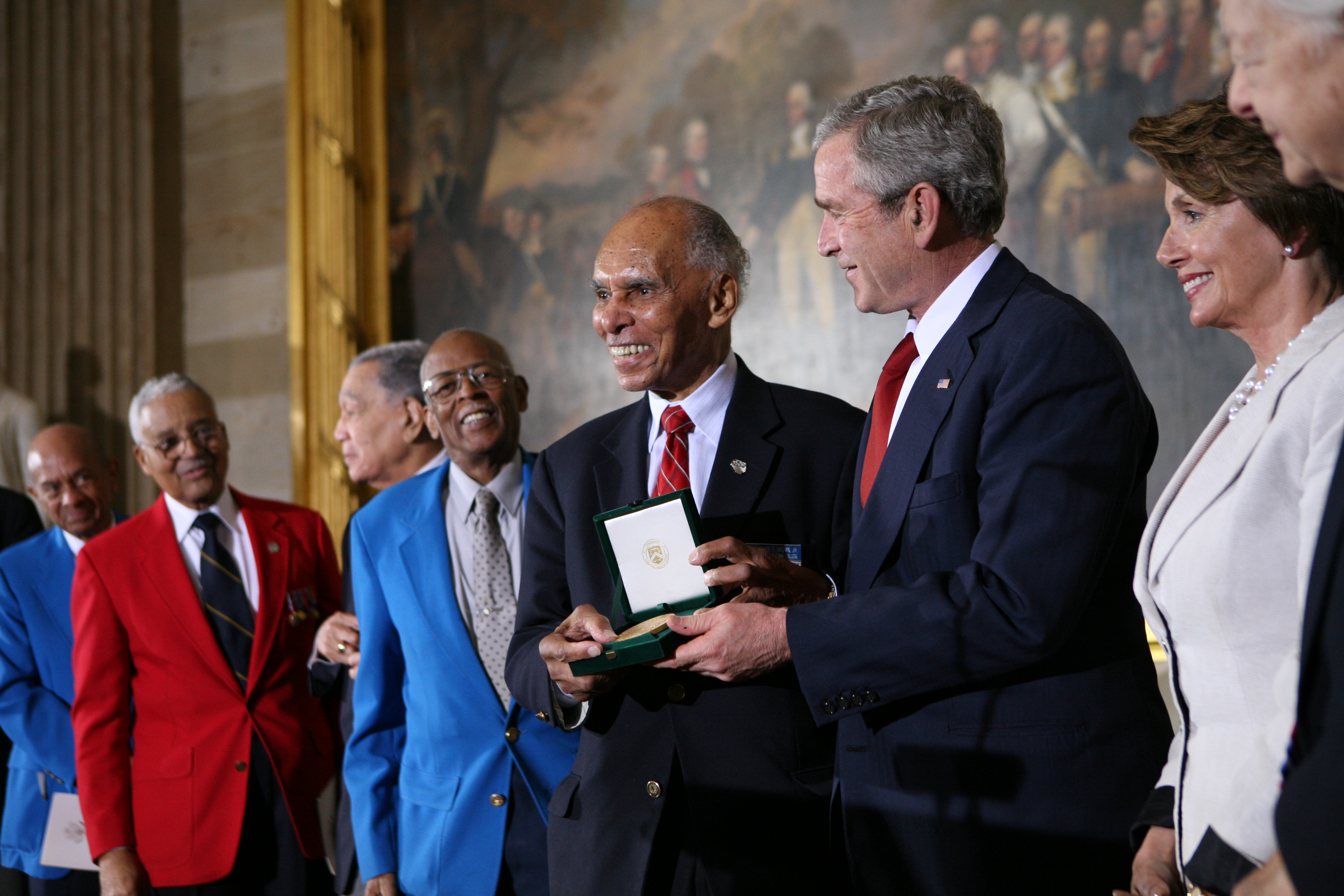
Brown receives the Congressional Gold Medal from President George W. Bush in 2007

After the war, Brown resumed his education. His doctoral dissertation at New York University was on exercise physiology.

Brown became a professor at New York University and directed the NYU Institute of Afro-American Affairs (now the Institute of African American Affairs) in 1950. Brown hosted The Soul of Reason, a radio talk show with interviewees which included politicians, professional athletes, medical professionals, and contemporary artists, which aired between 1971 and 1986. Brown also hosted Black Arts (1970–71) and CUNY TV show African American Legends. Brown was President of Bronx Community College from 1977 to 1993 and director for the Center for Education Policy at the City University of New York. Among his many distinguished awards, honors, and recognitions, he was elected into the National Academy of Kinesiology (née American Academy of Physical Education) in 1971 as an Associate Fellow. In 1992, Brown received an honorary doctor of humanics degree from his alma mater, Springfield College.

On March 29, 2007, Brown attended a ceremony in the U.S. Capitol rotunda, where he and the other Tuskegee Airmen were collectively awarded the Congressional Gold Medal in recognition of their service.

He was also a member and past president of the 100 Black Men of America New York Chapter. and professor of Urban Education at the CUNY Graduate Center.

Brown died on July 2, 2016, at Montefiore Medical Center in the Bronx, New York, at the age of 94. He had resided in Riverdale in his latter years. His ashes were interred at Arlington National Cemetery on what would have been his 95th birthday, March 9, 2017. A plaza at Aqueduct Walk in the Bronx was named for him in 2019.

== See also ==
- Executive Order 9981
- List of Tuskegee Airmen
- Military history of African Americans

Academic offices
Preceded by Morton Rosenstock	President of Bronx Community College; 1977 — 1993	Succeeded by Leo A. Corbie
