= William Sanders Scarborough =

African-American academic administrator (1852–1926)

William S. Scarborough
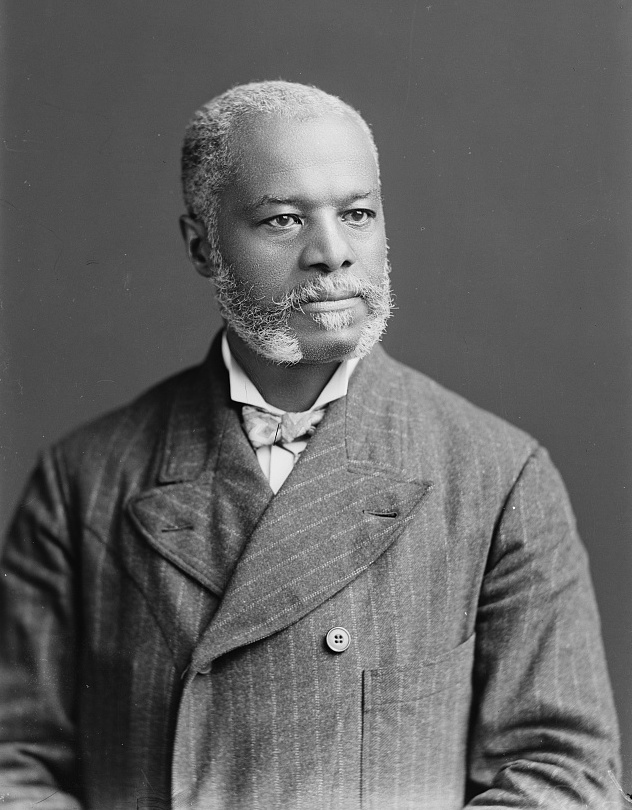
- Scarborough in 1903

President of Wilberforce University
- In office 1908–1920
- Preceded by: Joshua H. Jones
- Succeeded by: John A. Gregg

Personal details
- Born: William Sanders Scarborough; February 16, 1852 Macon, Georgia, United States
- Died: September 9, 1926 (aged 74) United States
- Spouse: Sarah Cordelia Bierce
- Parent(s): Jesse Scarborough, Frances Gwynn Scarborough
- Education: Lewis High School
- Alma mater: Atlanta University; Oberlin College
- Occupation: professor

William Sanders Scarborough (February 16, 1852 – September 9, 1926) was an American classical scholar and academic administrator. He is generally thought to be the first African American classical scholar. Born into slavery, Scarborough later served as president of Wilberforce University between 1908 and 1920. He wrote a popular university textbook on Classical Greek that was widely used in the 19th century.

== Early life and education ==
Scarborough was born in Macon, Georgia, in 1852 to Jesse and Frances Scarborough, a free railway employee, and an enslaved mother. Laws prescribed that he inherit his mother's status. His father had been freed in about 1846 but remained in Georgia to be with his mother.

Despite prohibitions against educating slaves, he was educated surreptitiously and had mastered the three R's, geography, and grammar by the age of 10. He became an apprentice shoemaker and served as the secretary of a prominent black association at an early age due to his level of education.

After the end of the American Civil War, he was able to complete his education at Lewis High School in Macon before attending Atlanta University in 1869 for two years before enrolling at Oberlin College. Scarborough completed his degree at Oberlin in 1875. He also completed his degree in June 1876 at Atlanta University (now Clark Atlanta University).

== Early career ==
After graduating from college, Scarborough returned as a teacher in classical languages to Lewis High School, where he met his future wife Sarah Bierce, who was the principal. Arsonists burned Lewis High School in 1876, and the local fire brigade let it burn to the ground. Scarborough briefly became principal of the Payne Institute in Cokesbury, South Carolina, but found the racial environment in South Carolina made it less hospitable than Georgia. He then returned to Oberlin to complete his master's degree.

== Wilberforce University ==
Scarborough became a professor in the classical department at Wilberforce University in Wilberforce, Ohio, in 1877. He married the white divorcée Sarah Cordelia Bierce, who had been a missionary in 1881 and also became a teacher at Wilberforce. Professor Scarborough published a popular Classical Greek textbook, First Lessons in Greek, in 1881 and became the first postmaster in Wilberforce in the same year. A second book, Birds of Aristophanes, followed in 1886.

Despite his prominence as a scholar, Scarborough suffered the effects of racial discrimination throughout his career. In 1909 when he had just become the president of Wilberforce, he was prohibited from attending an American Philological Association meeting in Baltimore, Maryland, because the hotel refused to serve dinner if he was present, and they were threatening to sue for breach of contract if the Association canceled the Conference. The paper that he was due to read at the conference was read by someone else. However, in 1892, Scarborough gave a lecture on Plato at the University of Virginia in a room hung with pictures of Jefferson Davis and other confederate leaders and where no other African Americans were allowed except as servants.

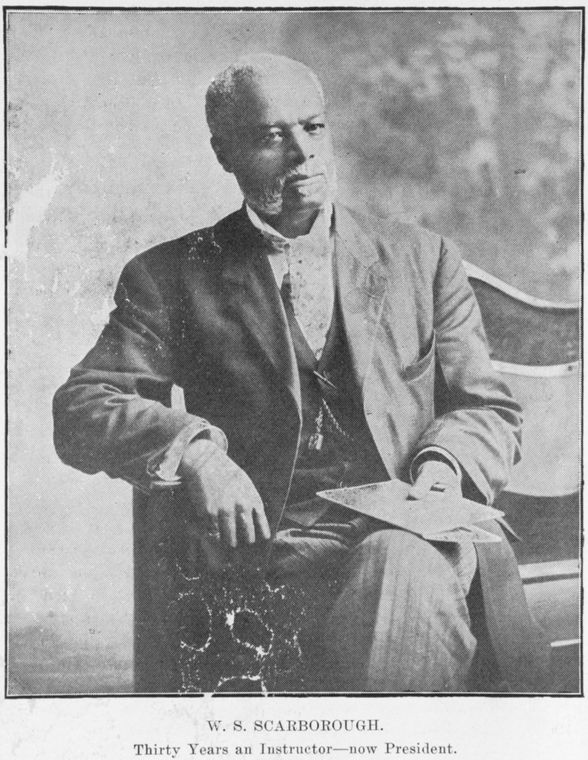
Scarborough in 1915

In 1908, Scarborough was appointed President of Wilberforce University, serving in that position until 1920. Wilberforce University was the third oldest African American college and Scarborough was considered one of the leading African American scholars. As such, he published a number of papers on Negro education, as well as his works on classical languages.

== Final years ==
In 1921, President Harding appointed Scarborough to a position in the United States Department of Agriculture which he occupied until his death. He was working on an autobiography which wasn't published during his lifetime. However, Michele Ronnick, professor in the Classics Department of Wayne State University, found a copy of the manuscript in the archives of the Ohio Historical Society. Ronnick edited The Autobiography of William Sanders Scarborough: An American Journey From Slavery to Scholarship, which was published in 2005 by Wayne State University Press with a foreword by Henry Louis Gates.

Scarborough was a participant at the London session of the second Pan-African Congress held in 1921.

== Associations ==
Scarborough was the third African American to join the American Philological Association and the first to join the Modern Language Association, the latter of which has named a first-book prize in his honor. He was a member of the American Spelling Reform Association, the American Social Science Association, the American Foreign Antislavery society, a mason of the I. O. Good Templars, and a member of the AME church. In the church, he was a trustee and Sunday School Superintendent. He gave many lectures throughout the country and frequently corresponded for newspapers and journals. He received an LL.D. from Liberia College in 1882.

He was a participant in the March 5, 1897 meeting to celebrate the memory of Frederick Douglass which founded the American Negro Academy led by Alexander Crummell. Scarborough played an active role in the early years of this first major African American learned society, which refuted racist scholarship, promoted black claims to individual, social, and political equality, and studied the history and sociology of African American life.

== Works ==
- First Lessons in Greek (A.S. Barnes & Co, 1881)
- Birds of Aristophanes (1886)
- Questions on Latin Grammar, with Appendix. (University Publication Company of New York 1887)
- The Autobiography of William Sanders Scarborough: An American Journey From Slavery to Scholarship (Unpublished during his lifetime)
