= James A. Colston =

Dr. James A. Colston

President of Georgia State College
- In office 1947–1949
- Preceded by: Benjamin F. Hubert
- Succeeded by: William K. Payne

Personal details
- Education: Morehouse College, New York University
- Profession: College President

James A. Colston (1910–1982) was a high school principal and served as president of several colleges in the United States. He served as president of Bethune-Cookman University 1942–46; Georgia State College (now Savannah State University) 1947–51; and Knoxville College 1951–65. He became the first African American to serve as president of a college in the state of New York and was among the first to lead a predominantly white college when he was named president of the Bronx Community College in 1966.

== Education ==
Colston received his B.S. in education from Morehouse College in 1932; his M.A. in education from Atlanta University in 1933 and later obtained his Ph.D. from New York University.

== Career ==
Colston served as principal of Ballard Normal School in Macon, Georgia from 1938 to 1942.

=== President ===
In 1942, Dr. Colston was named the second president of Bethune-Cookman University following the first retirement of the school's founder, Mary McLeod Bethune. While at Bethune Cookman, Colston launched the School of Education which became accredited in 1945. Dr. Colston served as president of Georgia State College from 1947 and until 1949, succeeding Benjamin F. Hubert.

It was during Colston’s term as president that Savannah State became accredited by the Southern Association of Colleges and Schools (SACS). During his term as president the campus was modernized to include the construction of the first student center and the installation of the first campus-wide telephone system. He established the school’s first Office of Public Relations and established the Campus Chest Program. Also during his tenure, the college’s land-grant status was transferred to Fort Valley State College (1949). Colston resigned in 1949.

From 1951 to 1965, Dr. Colston served as president of Knoxville College in Eastern Tennessee. Thereafter, Colston headed Bronx Community College from 1966 until 1976. During his tenure the college's enrollment expanded from 7,000 students to 13,800 students and achieved both financial and academic success. As the school's second president, Colston oversaw the transfer of Bronx Community College from its temporary location to its Harlem River campus prior to the fall of 1973.

== Legacy ==
The James A. Colston Administration Building on Savannah State University's campus is named in honor of Dr. Colston.

Academic offices
Preceded by Morris Meister	President of Bronx Community College; 1966 — 1976	Succeeded by Morton Rosenstock
Preceded by Benjamin F. Hubert	President of Georgia State College; 1947 — 1949	Succeeded by William K. Payne
