= LeRoy Smith =

American football player and coach (born 1933)

Biographical details
- Born: August 4, 1933; Fayette County, Kentucky, U.S.
- Died: October 25, 2002 (aged 69); Lexington, Kentucky, U.S.

Playing career
- c. 1957: Jackson State

Coaching career (HC unless noted)
- 1958: Mississippi Vocational
- 1964–1969: Tuskegee
- 1970–1981: Kentucky State

Head coaching record
- Overall: 106–77–7

LeRoy Victor Smith (August 4, 1933 – October 25, 2002) was an American college football coach. He served as the head football coach at Mississippi Vocational College (now known as Mississippi Valley State University) in 1958, the Tuskegee Institute (now known as Tuskegee University) from 1964 to 1969, and Kentucky State University from 1970 to 1981.

== Coaching career ==
=== Mississippi Valley State ===
Smith's first head coaching position was at Mississippi Valley State University in Itta Bena, Mississippi, where he coached the 1958 season. He was the third head coach for the Delta Devils and produced a record of 2–5–1.

=== Tuskegee ===
Smith waited six years to become a head coach again. He was named the tenth head football coach at Tuskegee University in Tuskegee, Alabama, and he held that position for six seasons, from 1964 until 1969. His coaching record at Tuskegee was 42–13–3.

=== Kentucky State ===
After his success at Tuskegee, Smith was the 16th head football coach at Kentucky State University in Frankfort, Kentucky, and he held that position for 12 seasons, from 1970 until 1981. His coaching record at Kentucky State was 62–59–3. The school's media guide lists a slightly different result, having him coach for 12½ seasons, from 1970 to midway through the 1982 season, with a record at Kentucky State of 65–62–3.

== Death and family ==
Smith was married to Mary L. Smith, who served as president of Kentucky State University from 1991 to 1998. He died on October 25, 2002.
