= Cynthia Robinson Alexander =

American academic administrator

Interim President of Savannah State University
- Incumbent
- Assumed office July 1, 2023
- Preceded by: Kimberly Ballard-Washington

Personal details
- Children: 2
- Education: Brown University; Harvard University; Boston University

Cynthia Robinson Alexander is an American academic administrator and interim president of Savannah State University, a role she assumed on July 1, 2023. She previously served as associate vice chancellor of finance for the University System of Georgia, where she managed alternative financing transactions and oversaw a $2.7 billion public-private venture portfolio.

== Education ==
Alexander received a B.A. in urban studies from Brown University, where she became a member of Alpha Kappa Alpha during her freshman year. She furthered her education at Harvard Kennedy School, earning a master's degree in city and regional planning with a concentration in real estate development and finance. She later obtained a J.D. from Boston University School of Law.

== Career ==
Alexander held senior leadership roles in private firms, including as senior vice president at Sumitomo Life Realty. In that position, she oversaw fiscal and portfolio management, focusing on investment activities across Washington, D.C., Atlanta, and Los Angeles.

In 2009, Alexander joined University System of Georgia (USG) as associate vice chancellor of finance. Her role involved managing USG’s alternative financing transactions, particularly its $2.7 billion public-private venture portfolio. She led teams in designing and implementing fiscal solutions for facilities across USG’s 26 public institutions. In this capacity, she worked with institutional presidents, chief business officers, and external stakeholders, ensuring adherence to policies while fostering facilities’ affordability and accessibility. Her efforts included coordinating with rating agencies, banks, and financial institutions to support public-private partnerships.

Throughout her time at USG, she participated in and led cross-disciplinary initiatives to address financial and infrastructural challenges. In 2016, she completed the USG’s executive leadership institute. She was active in the Atlanta real estate community, serving on boards and taking leadership positions, including as president of Commercial Real Estate Women (CREW).

On April 27, 2023, Alexander was appointed interim president of Savannah State University (SSU) by USG chancellor Sonny Perdue, officially assuming the role on July 1, 2023, following the departure of former president Kimberly Ballard-Washington. As interim president, Alexander has focused on student success and continuity within the institution which hosts approximately 3,200 students. In an August 2024 interview, she emphasized the legacy of SSU alumni within the local community, noting the achievements of alumni in prominent positions, including Savannah’s mayoral office. Alexander also highlighted the importance of introducing incoming freshmen to this legacy during a pinning ceremony, which served as an official welcome to the institution.

== Personal life ==
Alexander is from the Atlanta area. She is a graduate of the leadership Atlanta program and has served on the board of Big Brothers Big Sisters in Atlanta. She is a lifetime member of Jack and Jill of America and has been a member of her church, Mt. Zion AME Church in Decatur, Georgia, for several decades. She is married to Charles Barnett Alexander, and they have two sons.
