= Stephen Ballard (philanthropist) =

Businessman and philanthropist (1815–1901)

- Born: Stephen A. Ballard; September 9, 1815; Andover, Massachusetts, U.S.
- Died: August 11, 1901 (aged 85)
- Resting place: South Church Cemetery, Andover, Massachusetts, U.S.
- Occupations: Businessman; philanthropist

Stephen A. Ballard (September 9, 1815 – August 11, 1901) was a businessman in Brooklyn, New York and a philanthropist. He was in the leather business. He funded schools for African Americans in the southern United States including Ballard School in Macon, Georgia that was renamed for him. He also funded schools in Salisbury, North Carolina, Tougaloo, Mississippi, and Berea, Kentucky. He also donated money in support of students at Clark University in Atlanta. He left $50,000 to Berea College in his will.

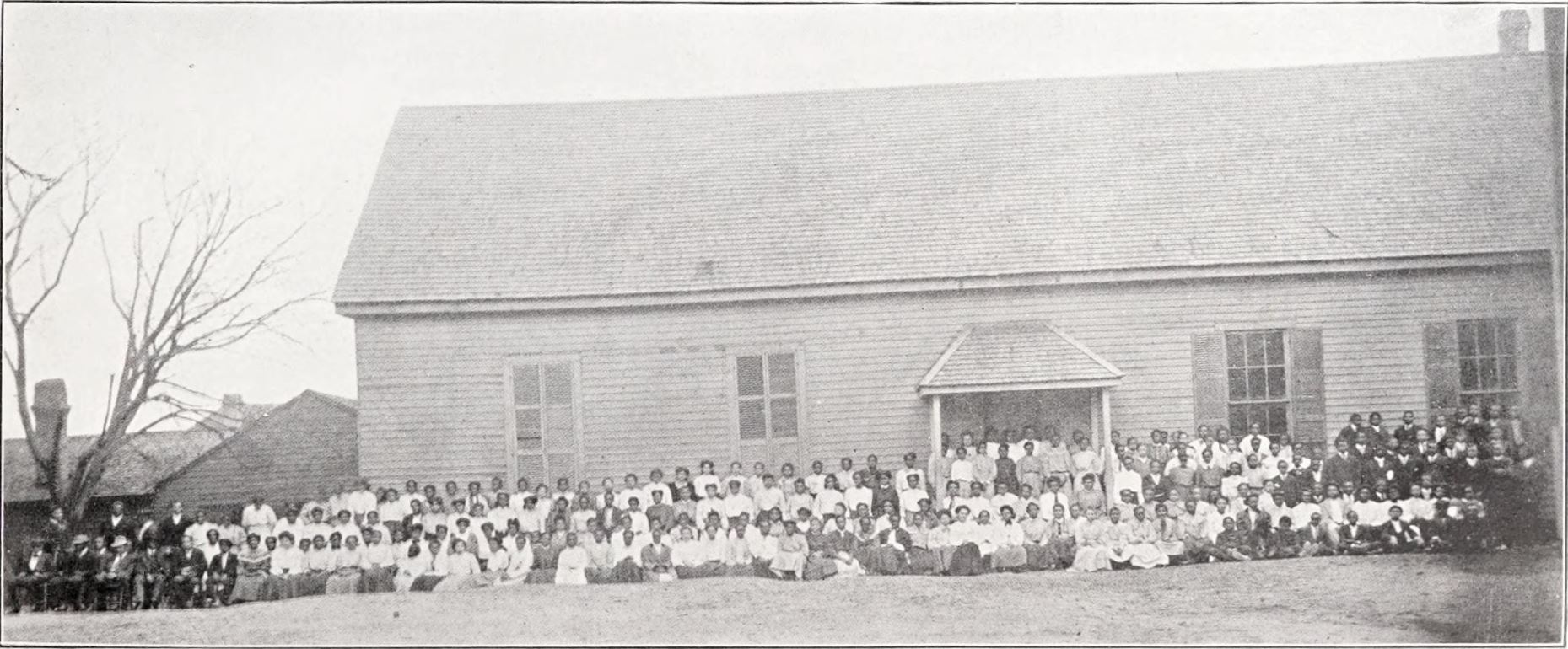
The industrial workshop and students of Ballard Normal School, c. 1910

Ballard was born in Andover, Massachusetts. He and his sister funded Andover Hall at Lewis Normal Institute. The school was renamed Ballard Normal School in his honor. He was a prominent member of the American Missionary Association (AMA).

Silas Belden Brown worked for his leather company. It was at 16 and 18 Chambers Street.

Ballard High School merged to form Ballard-Hudson High School.
