= Walter Broadnax =

American academic administrator (1944–2022)

Walter Doyce Broadnax

2nd President of Clark Atlanta University
- In office 2002–2008
- Preceded by: Thomas W. Cole Jr.
- Succeeded by: Carlton E. Brown

Distinguished Professor at Syracuse University
- In office 2008 – 2015

Personal details
- Born: October 21, 1944 Star City, Arkansas, U.S.
- Died: December 2, 2022 (aged 78) Syracuse, New York, U.S.
- Spouse: Angel Wheelock Broadnax
- Education: Washburn University; University of Kansas; Syracuse University
- Profession: Academic administrator, educator, university president

Walter Doyce Broadnax (October 21, 1944 – December 2, 2022) was an American academic administrator, educator, and university president. He was a Distinguished Professor of Public Administration at the Maxwell School of Citizenship and Public Affairs at Syracuse University, a role he held from 2008 until 2015. Prior to this appointment he served as the second president of Clark Atlanta University in Atlanta, Georgia, retiring after six years in July 2008. He held various roles in the federal government and as a state official.

== Biography ==
Born October 21, 1944, in Star City, Arkansas, to a railroad man named Walter Broadnax and mother Mary Lee Broadnax, Broadnax attended Roosevelt Elementary School in Hoisington, Kansas. He graduated from Hoisington High School in 1962 as an outstanding senior. He earned his B.A. degree from Washburn University in 1967. A Ford Foundation Fellow, Broadnax earned his M.P.A. degree from the University of Kansas in 1969 and his Ph.D. from the Maxwell School of Citizenship and Public Affairs in 1975.

From 1974 to 1975, Broadnax taught at Syracuse University and was a staff consultant to the New York State Department of Correctional Services. In 1976, he was appointed co-director, Joint International City Management Association/National Association of Schools of Public Affairs and Administration, Urban Management Education Program, United States Department of Housing and Urban Development, Washington, D.C. Until 1979, he was professor of public administration at the Federal Executive Institute while teaching at the University of Virginia, Howard University and the University of Maryland. He also worked as director of Services to Children, Youth and Adults for the State of Kansas in Topeka. Broadnax joined the Carter administration in 1980 as the Principal Deputy Assistant Secretary for the United States Department of Health, Education and Welfare. He was senior staff member for the Advanced Study Program of the Brookings Institution. In 1981, he joined Harvard Kennedy School, where he chaired the Massachusetts Executive Development Program and was founding director of the innovations in state and local government programs. In 1987, Broadnax was appointed president of the New York Civil Service Commission. He worked as adjunct professor of Public Policy at the University of Rochester from 1990 to 1993. In 1992, he served on the Harvard South Africa Program team and as a transition team leader for President Bill Clinton. In 1993, he served as president of the Center for Governmental Research, and from 1993 to 1996, Broadnax worked as Deputy Secretary and COO of the United States Department of Health and Human Services under Donna Shalala. He also worked as a professor at the University of Maryland and Dean of the School of Public Affairs at American University.

In 2002, Broadnax became the second president of Clark Atlanta University, after Thomas W. Cole Jr. Under his leadership, Clark Atlanta University became the second private historically Black College or university classified as a RU/H: Research Universities (high research activity) institution by the Carnegie Foundation. Howard University is the first RU/H: Research Universities (high research activity).

Broadnax served on Colin Powell's U.S. Secretary of State management advisory board, Comptroller General of the United States David Walker's advisory board and NASA's Return to Flight Task Force.

== Personal life and death ==
Broadnax was married to Angel L. Wheelock and had a daughter named Andrea.

Broadnax died in Syracuse, New York, on December 2, 2022, at the age of 78.

== See also ==
- List of presidents of Clark Atlanta University
