= Lewis High School (Macon, Georgia) =

High school in Georgia, United States

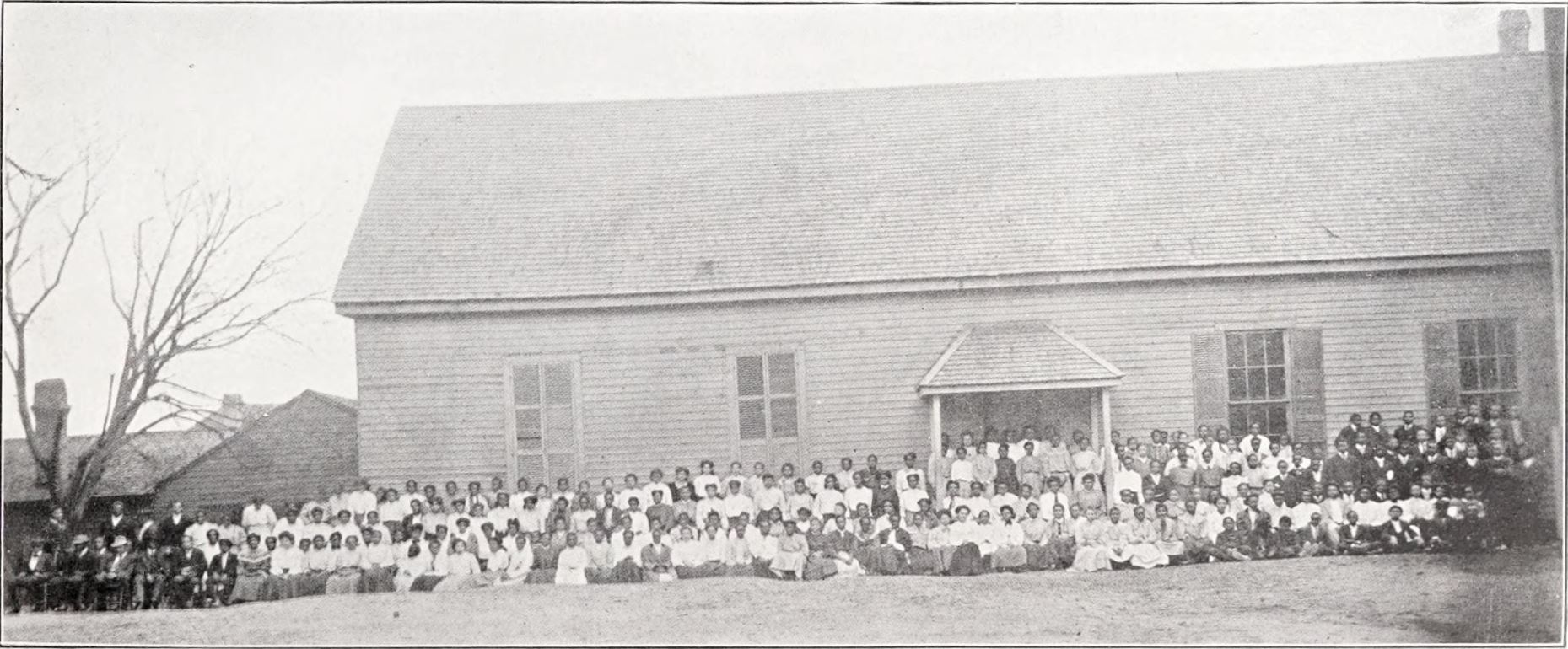
- The industrial workshop and students of Ballard Normal School, c. 1910

Location
- Macon, Georgia; United States; 32.8520°N 83.6463°W

Information
- Former names: Lewis Normal Institute (1885–), Ballard Normal School (1888–)
- Established: 1865
- Closed: 1949

Lewis High School (1865–1949) was a private primary and secondary school for African American students in Macon, Georgia, United States.

== History ==
Organized and funded by the American Missionary Association in 1865, it was named for General John R. Lewis, the leader of the Freedmen's Bureau in Georgia.

The school was destroyed by arsonists in 1876, and rebuilt again. It was training teachers by 1884. It became Lewis Normal Institute in 1885 and Ballard Normal School in 1888 for donor Stephen A. Ballard. His support helped fund a new building constructed for it in 1889 as well as a dormitory for girls funded by his sister.

The school was relocated to a new almost 5-acre campus in 1916 after the city purchased the existing site for the expansion of a hospital. By 1923 it was accredited by the Georgia Department of Education. It became a public high school in 1942. In 1949 the school district discontinued use of the school building and it was sold for use as a community center in 1950.

William Sanders Scarborough attended the school and returned to teach at it. He also met his wife at the school, she was a teacher.

== Principals ==
- Christine Gilbert (1880–1882)
- W. A. Hodge
- Livia A. Shae (1887)
- Julia B. Ford (1893)
- Francis T. Waters (1894)
- George C. Burrage (1895)
- Frank B. Stevens (1909)
- Raymond G. Von Tobel (1911–1935; when he died in a car crash)
- Lewis Mounts (acting principal)
- James A. Colston (1938–1943, he left.to become president of Bethune-Cookman College), the school's first African American principal
- Riago Martin (1944)

== Notable alumni ==
- Sidney David Williams, president of Elizabeth City State Teachers College
