= Prince A. Jackson Jr. =

American academic (1925–2010)

- Jackson pictured in The Tiger 1969, Savannah State yearbook

President of Savannah State College
- In office 1971–1978
- Preceded by: Howard Jordan Jr.
- Succeeded by: Wendell G. Rayburn

Personal details
- Born: March 17, 1925 Savannah, Georgia
- Died: September 21, 2010 (aged 85) Savannah, Georgia
- Education: Georgia State College
- Profession: Educator

Prince Albert Jackson Jr. (March 17, 1925 – September 21, 2010) served as president of Savannah State College (1971–1978). During the 1970s, he collaborated with the University System of Georgia and Armstrong State College in Savannah to develop an integration plan between the formerly all-white Armstrong State and (then) Georgia State, a historically black college (HBCU). The plan eliminated redundancy in the teaching and business degree programs in both colleges.

== Biography ==
=== Early life and education ===
He was born in Savannah, Georgia, on March 17, 1925, the son of Julia and Prince Albert Jackson. After graduating with honors from Beach-Cuyler High School, he joined the Naval Reserve.

Jackson was a graduate of (then) Georgia State College, with a B.A. in mathematics. He earned his M.A. in mathematics at New York University and a Ph.D. in philosophy at Boston College.

=== Early career ===
Jackson was a professor of mathematics, philosophy and history.

=== President ===
In 1971, Jackson became the second Savannah State alumnus to become president of the college. (Cyrus G. Wiley, the third president, was the first).

His administration established the Naval Reserve Officer Training Corps at Savannah State, creating a pipeline for students to train as naval officers. He also established WHCJ-FM, the university's radio station. He attracted more professors with doctorates, and managed institutionalization of the Title III program, re-accreditation by the Southern Association of Colleges and Schools, and a major building campaign.

As a result of a 1971 federal lawsuit, the University System of Georgia needed to integrate classes for then-Georgia State and Armstrong State colleges in Savannah. Traditionally having racially segregated student bodies, the colleges had duplicate programs in some areas. Jackson led Georgia State in collaborating on a solution, which resulted in his taking responsibility for business classes and awarding business degrees to students enrolled at either college. Classes and award of degrees for teaching were transferred to Armstrong State College in the process of implementation of the plan.

After serving as president, Jackson returned to teach as a professor of mathematics at Savannah State for more than 20 years. He retired from the university in 1999, when another teacher of mathematics, Jacquelyn M. Byers, said, "Prince, let's go," and they retired together. He published numerous articles and was active in professional and community organizations. A lifelong member of the NAACP, he served as president of the Savannah chapter in 2003.

== Personal life ==
Jackson married the former Marilyn Striggles of Sylvania, Georgia. They have five adult children.

He was Catholic, and the first Black member of the Knights of Columbus in the Savannah area.

== Legacy and honors ==
- Jackson received more than 50 academic honors and awards.

== Suggested reading ==
- Hall, Clyde W (1991). One Hundred Years of Educating at Savannah State College, 1890-1990, East Peoria, Ill.: Versa Press.

Academic offices
Preceded by Howard Jordan Jr.	President of Savannah State College; 1971–1978	Succeeded by Wendell G. Rayburn
