= Sidney David Williams =

American college administrator (1892–1974)

4th President of Elizabeth City State Teachers College
- In office January 1, 1946 – August 31, 1958

Dean of Elizabeth City State Teachers College
- In office 1930 – December 31, 1945

Personal details
- Born: July 15, 1892 Macon, Georgia, U.S.
- Died: January 21, 1974 (aged 81) Jamaica, Queens, New York, U.S.
- Education: Atlanta University, B.A. 1914 University of Chicago Teachers College, Columbia University, M.A. 1930

Sidney David Williams (July 15, 1892 – January 21, 1974) was an African American academic administrator. He was the president of Elizabeth City State Teachers College, now Elizabeth City State University.

== Early life ==
Williams was born on July 15, 1892 in Macon, Georgia. His parents were Alice Eleanor (née Andrews) and Lewis Hampton Williams, an educator and the namesake of L. H. Williams School in Macon. Williams attended the Green Street School and graduated from Lewis High School in Macon.

He graduated with a B.A. from the college course at Atlanta University in 1914. He then attended the University of Chicago. He received an M.A. from Teachers College, Columbia University in 1930.

== Career ==
After college, Williams taught and was athletic director at the Bluefield Colored Institute in Bluefield, West Virginia. From 1920 to 1929, Williams was the principal of Johnson C. Smith University's high school department and was director of its summer session.

In 1930, Williams started working at the State Colored Normal School at Elizabeth City as a teacher, principal, and dean. Williams became the fourth CEO and president of Elizabeth City State Teachers College on January 1, 1946. He stopped plans to close the college and oversaw improvements to its curricula, athletics, and physical plant, including an athletic field, two women's dormatories, a gymnasium, a health center, a science building, and cottages for faculty members. He also added the Vocational-Technical Institute. Under his leadership in 1948, the college was recognized by the Southern Association of Colleges and Schools as an A-rated institution, achieved only because Williams personally recruited the college's first full-time faculty with a doctorate degree. This was the highest level of accreditation that was available to Black colleges at the time. Williams retired on August 31, 1958, after working at the college for 29 years.

Williams was president of the North Carolina State Teachers Association and the North Carolina Negro College Conference. He was the secretary of the North Carolina Congress of Colored Parents and Teachers for fifteen years. He was the founder of the Northeastern Teachers Association. He also served on the Central Intercollegiate Athletic Association board of directors.

== Honors ==
In 1950, Williams received a gold medal for meritorious service to the North Carolina Congress of Colored Parents and Teachers. Johnson C. Smith University presented Williams with an honorary Doctor of Pedagogy in June 1950.

In April 1955, Elizabeth City State Teachers College held a testimonial banquest in celebration of Williams' 25th year at the college; the event feature speakers ranging from students to presidents of other North Carolina colleges. He was also an honorary member of Alpha Phi Alpha at the college. In 1957, Williams received an Honorary Modern Farmer degree from the Agricultural and Technical College of North Carolina.

Williams Hall on the campus of Elizabeth City State University was named in his honor. The college's board of trustees designated him as president-emeritus on September 16, 1969. Williams was a charter member of Elizabeth City State University's Viking Hall of Fame for his role in establishing sports on campus.

== Personal life ==
Williams married Mary Jackson Brydie in Clarke County, Georgia on September 6, 1917. They had one daughter, Carolyn D. Williams.

Williams organized and was president of the Northeastern District Schoolmasters Club in 1930. In 1950, he was chairman of the annual Negro Day at The Lost Colony. He was a member of Westminster Presbyterian Church in Jamaica, Queens.

Williams died in a hospital in Jamaica, New York, on January 21, 1974, at the age of 82.
