= Earl G. Yarbrough =

American university administrator

Earl Glenn Yarbrough Sr.

Former President of Savannah State University
- In office May 30, 2007 – May 8, 2011
- Preceded by: Carlton E. Brown

Personal details
- Born: 1946 (age 79–80) Wichita, Kansas
- Spouse: Patricia Yarbrough
- Children: Kim Yarbrough; Angela Yarbrough; Delmar Yarbrough; Earl Yarbrough, Jr.
- Education: Wichita State University; California State University at Los Angeles; Iowa State University
- Website: Official Biography at savstate.edu

Earl Glenn Yarbrough Sr. (born 1946) was a former president of the Savannah State University from May 30, 2007, until May 8, 2011.

== Biography ==
=== Education ===
Born 1946, he is a native of Wichita, Kansas. He earned a Bachelor of Arts degree in industrial education from Wichita State University in 1969. He earned a Master of Arts degree in industrial studies from California State University, Los Angeles in 1974, and a Doctorate degree in industrial education from Iowa State University (ISU) in 1976.

=== Early career ===
Yarbrough's first academic position was at Northeastern State University in Tahlequah, Oklahoma in 1976. In 1984, he moved to the University of Arkansas at Pine Bluff as Chair of the Industrial Technology Program. In 1986 he was appointed founding dean of the North Carolina Agricultural and Technical State University School of Technology, a post he held until 1998 when he moved to Virginia State University.

==== Virginia State University ====
Yarbrough served as a full professor of Industrial Education and Technology and Vice President for Academic and Student Affairs at Virginia State University before being named provost and vice president for Academic and Student Affairs from 1998 until 2003.

==== President-elect of Knoxville College ====
On December 1, 2006, Yarbrough was named president-elect of Knoxville College, however the institution was unable to pay his salary and that of his staff, so the board terminated his contract so he could assume the presidency at Savannah State.

=== President of Savannah State University ===
On May 30, 2007, Yarbrough became the President of Savannah State University. On April 19, 2011, the Board of Regents for the University System of Georgia voted not renew Yarbrough's annual contract as president of the university.

== Awards and honors ==
Yarbrough has received numerous awards and honors including:

- Dr. Alvin Rudisill Exemplary Service Award (1995) - Presented by the National Association of Industrial Technology
- Kellogg Leadership Fellow in the National Association for Equal Opportunity in Higher Education National Leadership Institute (2003) - One of 13 faculty members selected from historically and predominantly Black colleges and universities in the United States.
- Region 3 Outstanding Industrial Technology Professor Award (2004) - Presented by the University Division of the National Association of Industrial Technology
- Member of the Telfair Museum of Art board of trustees - appointed in December 2007.

== Published works ==
- Yarbrough, E. "A Contemporary Role for Industrial Arts", Journal of Epsilon Pi Tau, n.d. 1977.
- Yarbrough, E. G. (1976). An analysis of white students' evaluations of black instructors in predominantly white colleges and universities . Thesis (Ph.D.)--Iowa State University, 1976.

== Personal life ==
Yarbrough is married (wife Patricia) and the father of four children.

Academic offices
Preceded by Carlton E. Brown	President of Savannah State University; 2007 — 2011	Succeeded by Cheryl Davenport Dozier (Interim)
