= Bryant Gumbel =

American journalist and sportscaster (born 1948)

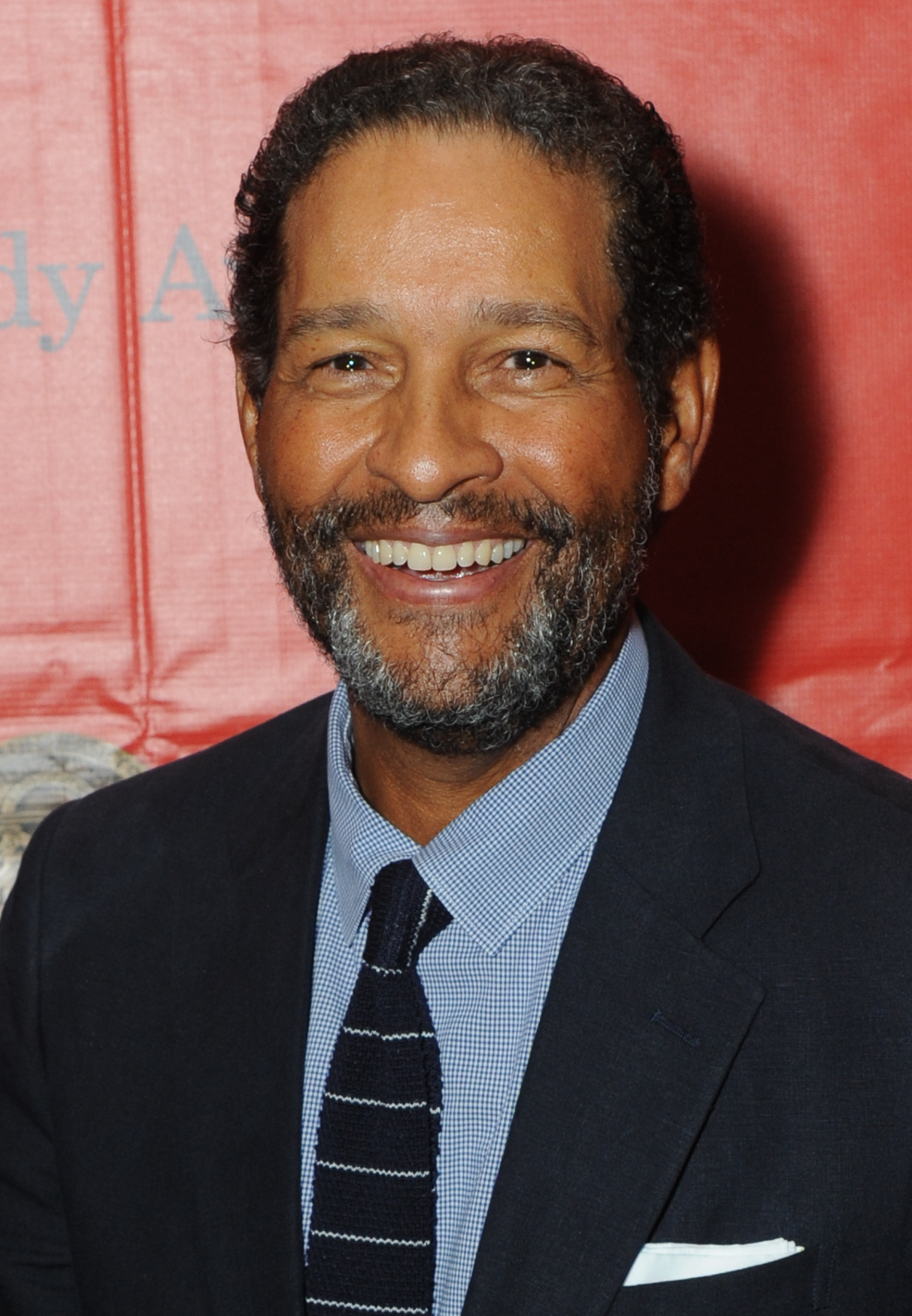
- Gumbel in 2013
- Born: Bryant Charles Gumbel; September 29, 1948 (age 78); New Orleans, Louisiana, U.S.
- Education: Bates College
- Occupations: Television personality, sportscaster
- Years active: 1972–2023
- Notable credit(s): The Today Show; The Early Show; Real Sports with Bryant Gumbel
- Spouses: June Baranco (m. 1973; div. 2001) Hilary Quinlan (m. 2002)
- Children: 2
- Relatives: Greg Gumbel (brother)

Bryant Charles Gumbel (born September 29, 1948) is a retired American television journalist and sportscaster. He was best known for his 15 years as co-host of NBC's Today. His older brother was sportscaster Greg Gumbel. From 1995 to 2023, he hosted HBO's acclaimed investigative series Real Sports with Bryant Gumbel, which has been rated as "flat out TV's best sports program" by the Los Angeles Times. It won a Peabody Award in 2012.

Gumbel was hired by NBC Sports in the fall of 1975 as co-host of its National Football League pre-game show GrandStand with Jack Buck. From 1975 until January 1982 (when he left to do The Today Show), he hosted numerous sporting events for NBC including Major League Baseball, college basketball and the National Football League. He returned to sportscasting for NBC when he hosted the prime time coverage of the 1988 Summer Olympics from Seoul and the PGA Tour in 1990.

NBC News made Gumbel the principal anchor of Today beginning September 27, 1982, and broadcast from Vietnam, Vatican City, Europe, South America, and much of the United States between 1984 and 1989. Gumbel's work on Today earned him several Emmys and a large fanbase. He is the third longest serving co-host of Today, after former hosts Matt Lauer and Katie Couric. He left the show on January 3, 1997, after 15 years.

Gumbel moved to CBS, where he hosted various shows before becoming co-host of the network's morning show The Early Show on November 1, 1999. Gumbel was hosting The Early Show on the morning of September 11, 2001. He was the first to announce the September 11 attacks to CBS viewers. Gumbel left CBS and The Early Show on May 17, 2002.

== Early life, family and education ==
Gumbel was born in New Orleans, Louisiana, to Rhea Alice (née LeCesne), a city clerk; and Richard Dunbar Gumbel, a judge. Gumbel's paternal great-great-grandfather was a German-Jewish emigrant from the village of Albisheim. Raised Catholic, he attended and graduated from De La Salle Institute in Chicago, while growing up on the South Side of the city; his family had moved north when he was a child. He graduated from Bates College in 1970 with a degree in Russian history. He was one of four siblings, including two sisters and an older brother, Greg Gumbel, who also became a nationally recognized sports broadcaster.

== Career ==
In 1971, he became editor of Black Sports, leaving the following year. He began his television career in October 1972, when he was made a sportscaster for KNBC-TV in Los Angeles.

=== NBC ===
==== NBC Sports ====
Already a local evening news sports anchor for KNBC (a Los Angeles television station owned and operated by NBC), Gumbel began appearing on NBC Sports telecasts in the fall of 1975, as co-host of its National Football League pre-game show GrandStand with Jack Buck. From 1975 until January 1982 (when he left to do The Today Show), he hosted numerous sporting events for NBC including Major League Baseball, college basketball and the National Football League. He returned to sportscasting for NBC when he hosted the prime time coverage of the 1988 Summer Olympics from Seoul and the PGA Tour in 1990.

One of Gumbel's more memorable moments during his time at NBC Sports occurred when he was on-site for the "Epic in Miami" NFL playoff game between the San Diego Chargers and Miami Dolphins. At the end of the game, he told the viewers, "If you didn't like this football game then you don't like football!" This would be one of his final assignments for NBC Sports, as he began co-hosting Today two days later.

==== Today ====
Gumbel began his affiliation with Today as the program's chief sports reporter contributing twice-weekly features to the program, including a regular series entitled "Sportsman of the Week," featuring up-and-coming athletes. In June 1981, NBC announced that Tom Brokaw would depart Today to anchor the NBC Nightly News with Roger Mudd beginning in the spring of 1982. The search for Brokaw's replacement was on, and the initial candidates were all NBC News correspondents, including John Palmer, Chris Wallace, Bob Kur, Bob Jamieson, and Jessica Savitch. The candidates auditioned for Brokaw's job throughout the summer of 1981 when he was on vacation. Gumbel became a candidate for the job just by chance when he served as a last-minute substitute for Today co-anchor Jane Pauley in August 1981. He so impressed executive producer Steve Friedman and other NBC executives that he quickly became a top contender for the Today anchor position. While Friedman and other NBC executives favored Gumbel as Brokaw's replacement, another contingent within the NBC News division felt strongly that he should be replaced by a fellow news correspondent, not a sports reporter. Wallace was the favored candidate of then-NBC News president Bill Small. NBC News decided to split the difference, selecting Gumbel as the program's anchor and Wallace as the Washington-based anchor. Pauley would remain co-anchor in New York. Brokaw signed off of Today on December 18, 1981, and Gumbel replaced him on January 4, 1982. Gumbel and Brokaw had previously worked together on KNBC's 6:00 p.m. newscast in the mid-1970s, with Brokaw as anchor and Gumbel on sports.

The Gumbel–Pauley–Wallace arrangement, known internally as the "Mod Squad", lasted only nine months. It was an arrangement that proved intriguing on paper but unwieldy on television. Gumbel served as the show's traffic cop, opening and closing the program and conducting New York–based interviews, but Pauley and Wallace handled newsreading duties, and Wallace conducted all Washington-based hard news interviews. With ABC's Good Morning America in first place and expanding its lead, NBC News made Gumbel the principal anchor of Today beginning September 27, 1982, with Pauley as his co-anchor. Wallace became the chief White House correspondent covering President Ronald Reagan, and John Palmer, previously a White House correspondent, became Today's New York–based news anchor.

Gumbel and Pauley had a challenging first two years together as Today anchors as they sought to find a rhythm as a team. Good Morning America solidified its lead over Today in the ratings during the summer of 1983, and Pauley's departure for maternity leave sent Today into a ratings tailspin. But when she returned in February 1984, they began to work well together as a team. NBC took Today on the road in the fall of '84, sending Gumbel to the Soviet Union for an unprecedented series of live broadcasts from Moscow. He won plaudits for his performance, erasing any doubts about his hard-news capabilities. That trip began a whirlwind period of travel for Today. Remote broadcasts from Vietnam, Vatican City, Europe, South America, and much of the United States followed between 1984 and 1989. Today began to regain its old ratings dominance against Good Morning America throughout 1985, and by early 1986, the NBC program was once again atop the ratings.

During this time, Gumbel had developed animosity toward David Letterman when the Late Night host disrupted taping of a Today primetime special in Rockefeller Center with a bullhorn. "If I had gotten to him, I would have hit him," Gumbel said of Letterman. The pair would reconcile a few years later.

In 1989, Gumbel, who was already known for his strong management style as Today anchor, wrote a memo to the executive producer Marty Ryan, on Ryan's request, critiquing the program and identifying its shortcomings. Many of his criticisms were directed at fellow Today staffers. It was leaked to the press. In the memo, Gumbel commented that Willard Scott "holds the show hostage to his assortment of whims, wishes, birthdays and bad taste ... this guy is killing us and no one's even trying to rein him in". He commented that Gene Shalit's movie reviews "are often late and his interviews aren't very good."

There was enough negative backlash in regard to Gumbel's comments toward Scott that he was shown making up with Scott on Today.

Following Pauley's departure from Today in December 1989, Gumbel was joined by Deborah Norville in a short-lived partnership that lasted just over a year. Today dropped to second place in the ratings during this period as a result of intensely negative publicity surrounding Norville's replacement of Pauley, and Gumbel's feud with Scott. Norville was replaced by Katie Couric in April 1991, and the Gumbel-Couric team helped refocus Today as the morning news program on public affairs during the 1992 presidential campaign. The program returned to first place in the ratings in December 1995.

Gumbel's work on Today earned him several Emmys and a large group of fans. He is the third longest serving co-host of Today, after Matt Lauer and Couric. He stepped down from the show on January 3, 1997, after 15 years.

Since his departure, Gumbel has made occasional appearances on Today. He appeared for the show's 60th anniversary and hosted with Lauer and Pauley on December 30, 2013.

=== CBS ===
==== Public Eye with Bryant Gumbel ====
After 15 years on Today, Gumbel moved to CBS to host a new prime time news-magazine called Public Eye with Bryant Gumbel during the 1997–1998 television season. The episode "The Reckoning" won a Peabody Award in 1998. It lasted just one season before being cancelled. It aired on Wednesday nights at 9pm ET before moving to Tuesdays at 9pm ET.

==== The Early Show ====
After the cancellation of Public Eye, Gumbel hosted various other CBS shows before becoming co-host of the network's morning show The Early Show on November 1, 1999. Gumbel left The Early Show (and CBS that same year) on May 17, 2002. Gumbel was hosting The Early Show on the morning of September 11, 2001. He was the first to announce the September 11 attacks to CBS viewers.

In the spring and summer of 2010, he served as a special guest moderator of ABC's The View for multiple days.

==== Boy Scouts incident ====
A CBS camera caught a disgusted Gumbel blurting out, "What a fucking idiot," just after he had finished a hostile interview with Robert Knight of the Family Research Council (FRC). The incident occurred at about 7:15 a.m. ET on Thursday, June 29, 2000, following Knight's appearance to defend the Boy Scout policy of excluding gays from being leaders. The Media Research Center reported that he uttered those words; Gumbel openly admitted to saying so when guest-hosting a June 2007 episode of Live with Regis and Kelly.

==== Survivor ====
Gumbel was the host of the reunion special for the first three seasons of the reality competition series Survivor (Borneo, The Australian Outback, and Africa). Hosting duties were taken over by Rosie O'Donnell for the following Marquesas, then series host Jeff Probst for the remainder of the series, starting with Thailand until the series did away with reunion shows after Island of the Idols in 2019, until returning for In the Hands of the Fans in 2026.

=== Real Sports with Bryant Gumbel ===
Gumbel was the host of HBO's investigative series Real Sports with Bryant Gumbel from 1995 to 2023. It won a Peabody Award in 2012.

==== Notable remarks ====
In February 2006, Gumbel made remarks seen as controversial regarding the Winter Olympics and the lack of Black athlete participation, while others considered it important sports journalism commentary.

So try not to laugh when someone says these are the world's greatest athletes, despite a paucity of Blacks that makes the Winter Games look like a GOP convention.

On the August 15, 2006, episode of Real Sports with Bryant Gumbel, Gumbel made the following remarks about former NFL commissioner Paul Tagliabue and Players' Union president Gene Upshaw and directed these comments to new commissioner Roger Goodell:

Before he cleans out his office, have Paul Tagliabue show you where he keeps Upshaw's leash. By making the docile head of the players' union his personal pet, your predecessor has kept the peace without giving players the kind of guarantees other pros take for granted. Try to make sure no one competent ever replaces Upshaw on your watch.

In response, Tagliabue said:

What Gumbel said about Gene Upshaw and our owners is about as irresponsible as anything I've heard in a long time.

On the October 18, 2011, Gumbel evoked slavery in his criticism of NBA Commissioner David Stern over the league's lockout.

His efforts are typical of a commissioner who has always seemed eager to be viewed as some kind of modern-day plantation overseer, treating (National Basketball Association) men as if they were his boys. ... His moves are intended to do little more than show how he's the one keeping the hired hands in their place.

In a Rolling Stone article dated January 20, 2015, Gumbel said: "There are a few things I hate more than the NRA. I mean truly. I think they're pigs. I think they don't care about human life. I think they are a curse upon the American landscape. So we got that on the record."

=== The Weather Man ===
Gumbel made a cameo appearance alongside Nicolas Cage and Michael Caine in The Weather Man, a film directed by Gore Verbinski. In it, he cohosts a morning show entitled Hello America, for which Cage's character, a depressed weatherman, auditions.

=== Seinfeld ===
Gumbel made a cameo appearance on the NBC sitcom Seinfeld during which he interviewed Jerry Seinfeld on Today while Jerry was wearing the puffy pirate shirt in the episode "The Puffy Shirt".

=== The Nanny ===
Gumbel made a cameo appearance on the sitcom The Nanny during which he gives Fran Fine an audition for a job in television in the episode "Fair Weather Fran".

=== NFL Network ===
In April 2006, NFL Network announced that Gumbel, along with Cris Collinsworth and Dick Vermeil, would comment on its new package of NFL games. Unlike his brother Greg, he had never called play-by-play for live sporting events in his career. Before his first game commentary for the network, his status was brought into question after he stirred up controversy in his closing remarks on his HBO program on August 15, 2006, in which he criticized NFL Players Association head Gene Upshaw and outgoing NFL Commissioner Paul Tagliabue. He would later reconcile with the NFL and retained his play-by-play job with the NFL Network. On December 29, 2007, he had a reunion of sorts as he called the Patriots-Giants game on the NFL Network, CBS, and NBC. This is the first three-network simulcast NFL game and, coincidentally, he has worked for all three networks during his career. He also had a strong affiliation with NFL Films.

Gumbel's performance was the subject of criticism over his entire run because of his voice and a perceived lack of knowledge about the game. Gumbel stepped down as play-by-play announcer in April 2008, prior to the 2008 NFL season. He would be replaced on the NFL Network telecasts by Bob Papa, then the radio play-by-play announcer for the New York Giants.

=== Brain Surgery Live ===
In 2015, Gumbel hosted the first ever live televised brain surgery during a two-hour National Geographic special. The two-hour event, titled Brain Surgery Live with Mental Floss, gave viewers an up-close look at an awake deep brain stimulation surgery. Filming took place via two handheld cameras as well as several robotic cameras with inputs directly in the doctors' surgical equipment, allowing viewers to see live images as the brain was being operated on in real time.

== Personal life ==
Gumbel raised two children with his wife, June, in Waccabuc, north of New York City. In 2001, he divorced her to marry Hilary Quinlan. Around 2002, he shed 55 pounds of weight in seven months. In October 2009, he had surgery to remove a malignant tumor near one of his lungs.

On October 20, 2025, Gumbel was reportedly rushed to a hospital after suffering a medical emergency. A family member told TMZ he was "okay".

== Awards ==
- 4 Emmy Awards
- Frederick D. Patterson Award from the United Negro College Fund
- Martin Luther King Award from the Congress of Racial Equality
- Three NAACP Image Awards, including the President's Award
- Edward R. Murrow Award for Outstanding Foreign Affairs work from the Overseas Press Club, September 1984
- Edward Weintal Prize for diplomatic reporting
- Peabody Award for his reporting in Vietnam
- International Journalism Award from TransAfrica
- Africa's Future Award from the U.S. Committee for UNICEF
- Leadership Award from the African-American Institute
- Best Morning TV News Interviewer, the Washington Journalism Review, 1986
- National Association of Black Journalists, Journalist of the Year Award, 1993
- Trumpet Award of the Turner Broadcasting System, Inc.
- Alfred I. duPont-Columbia University Award for outstanding broadcast journalism for Real Sports with Bryant Gumbel (HBO), December 2005

Preceded by Tom Brokaw	Today Show host January 4, 1982 – January 3, 1997 with Jane Pauley from 1982 to 1989; Deborah Norville from 1990 to 1991 and Katie Couric from 1991 to 1997	Succeeded by Matt Lauer
Preceded by Jim McKay	American television prime time anchor, Summer Olympic Games; 1980 (with Dick Enberg); 1988	Succeeded by Bob Costas
Preceded by First play-by-play commentator	Thursday Night Football play-by-play commentator 2006–07	Succeeded by Bob Papa
