= Ballard-Hudson High School =

Secondary school in Macon, Georgia, USA

Coordinates: 32°49′9″N 83°39′29″W

Ballard-Hudson High School was a high school in Macon, Georgia, United States.

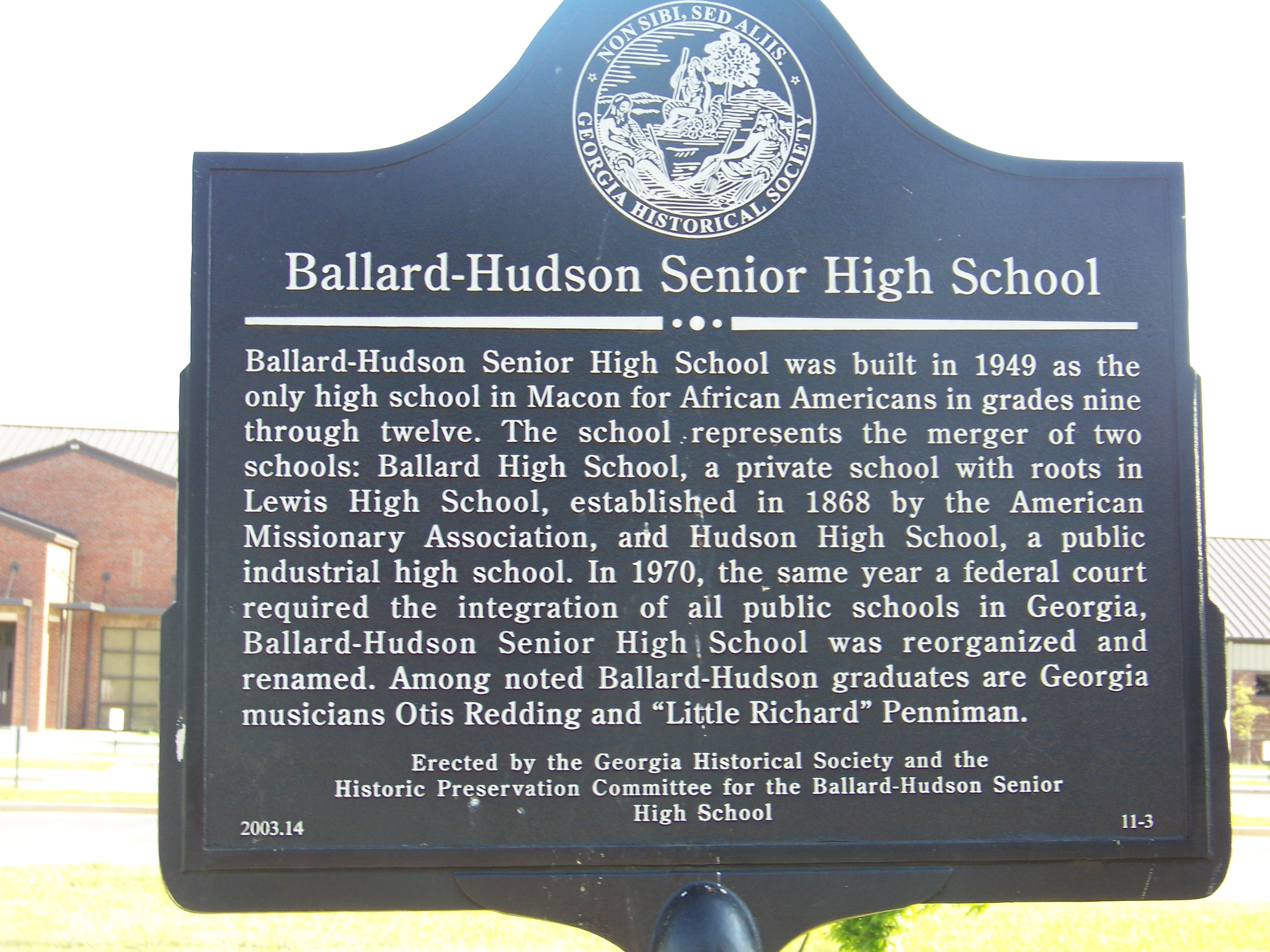
Ballard Hudson Historic Marker

Several buildings have existed on the site. Ballard-Hudson Senior High School was built in 1949 as the only high school in Macon for African Americans in grades nine through twelve. The school represents the merger of two schools: Ballard High School, a private school with roots in Lewis High School, established in 1868 by the American Missionary Association, and Hudson High School, a public industrial high school. In 1970, the same year a federal court required the integration of all public schools in Georgia, Ballard-Hudson Senior High School was reorganized and renamed as Ballard Hudson Junior High "B" and along with the newer Ballard Hudson "A" Junior High further west on Anthony Road, became the feeder schools of the consolidated Southwest Senior High School (formally Willingham Boys and McEvoy Girls High Schools). The 1949 campus was demolished and replaced on the same site with Southeast High School.

It competed in the Georgia Interscholastic Association and won state championships in basketball.

In January 2008 a new Ballard Hudson Middle School was built, as a part of the 2005 Capital Improvement Program, funded by the ESPLOST.

== Notable alumni ==
- Tommy Hart, former professional football player (San Francisco 49ers, Chicago Bears, New Orleans Saints)
- Beverly Harvard, first Black female police chief of a major US city (Atlanta)
- Blue Moon Odom, former professional baseball player (Oakland Athletics, Atlanta Braves, Chicago White Sox)
- Otis Redding, musician
- Little Richard, musician
- Elmore Smith, former professional basketball player (Buffalo, Los Angeles Lakers, Milwaukee Bucks, Cleveland Cavaliers)

== See also ==
- Stephen Ballard, philanthropist who founded Ballard High School
