= Howard Jordan Jr. =

American educator (1916–1986)

- Jordan pictured in The Tiger 1964, Savannah State yearbook

President of Savannah State College
- In office 1963–1971
- Preceded by: William K. Payne
- Succeeded by: Prince A. Jackson Jr.

Personal details
- Born: December 28, 1916 Beaufort, South Carolina, U.S.
- Died: December 2, 1986 (aged 69) LaGrange, Georgia, U.S.
- Profession: educator

Howard Jordan Jr. (December 28, 1916 – December 2, 1986) served as president of Savannah State College from 1963 and until 1971.

== Biography ==
Howard Jordan Jr. became president of Savannah State College in September 1963 following the death of William K. Payne in August 1963. During his tenure as president the college established Savannah's first graduate program in education (Master of Science in Elementary Education, 1968) and saw the program gain NCATE accreditation. Additionally, white students were admitted to the college as a result of the Civil Rights Act of 1964 and the first white faculty members were hired.

Also during Jordan's administration a major building program began which resulted in the construction of a modern student union, new football stadium, fine arts building, Payne Hall, and new dormitories for men and women.

Jordan resigned from the college in 1971 to accept a position as vice chancellor for the central office of the Georgia Board of Regents of the University System of Georgia. He was the first African-American to hold this position. Ursula H. Shelton was the first African-American Administrative Assistant to work under Dr. Jordan during this new era in Atlanta.

== Legacy ==
The Howard Jordan Business Building on the university's campus is named in honor of Dr. Jordan. It houses 11 classrooms and the supporting staff and faculty offices. It also has a 300-seat auditorium, a general computer lab and business media facilities.

== Suggested Reading ==
- Hall, Clyde W (1991). One Hundred Years of Educating at Savannah State College, 1890–1990. East Peoria, Ill.: Versa Press.

Academic offices
Preceded by William K. Payne	President of Savannah State College; 1963 — 1971	Succeeded by Prince A. Jackson Jr.
