= Morton Rosenstock =

American historian

Morton Rosenstock (died February 19, 2002) was a historian, author, and college administrator in the United States. He was the acting president of Bronx Community College from 1976 to 1977 when he was succeeded by Roscoe C. Brown Jr. He wrote a book about Louis Marshall (1856–1929), a corporate lawyer and advocate for Jewish rights. He also wrote a book about Bronx Community College. He was a professor at Bronx Community College.

He wrote the article "Are There Too Many Jews At Harvard?" He wrote a book reviews in American Jewish Historical Quarterly.

== Books ==
- Napoleon and the Jews, Harvard University A.B. thesis (1949)
- The Jews of Algeria: 1790-1848, masters essay, Columbia Univerdity (1951)
- Louis Marshall, Defender of Jewish Rights Wayne State University Press, Detroit (1965)
- Four decades of achievement : Bronx Community College of the City University of New York by Morton Rosenstock
- A half century in pursuit of excellence : Bronx Community College of the City University of New York
