= William K. Payne =

- Payne pictured in The Tiger 1953, Savannah yearbook

President of Georgia State College Savannah State College
- In office 1949–1963
- Preceded by: James A. Colston
- Succeeded by: Howard Jordan Jr.

Personal details
- Born: August 23, 1903 Calhoun, Alabama
- Died: July 26, 1963 (aged 59) Savannah, Georgia
- Profession: educator

William Kenneth Payne (August 23, 1903 – July 26, 1963) served as president of Georgia State College from 1949 until his death in 1963.

== Biography ==
=== Education ===
William Kenneth Payne graduated Morehouse College in 1923.

=== Early career ===
Payne, who was the dean of Georgia State College, became acting president when James A. Colston resigned in 1949.

=== President ===
Payne became president of Georgia State College in 1950. The first modern era building program was started during Payne’s tenure as President. Current campus buildings including Richard R. Wright Hall, Colston Hall, Wiley Gymnasium, and B. F. Hubert Technical Sciences Center were constructed during this period. Additionally, it was during his term that the institution’s name was changed to Savannah State College (September 1950).

President Payne died in August 1963 while in office.

== Legacy ==
William K. Payne Hall, dedicated in 1966, has been the home of English, Social Studies, Social Work, Criminal Justice, and Sociology departments. Currently, the building houses the Department of English, Languages, and Cultures.

== Suggested Reading ==
- Hall, Clyde W (1991). One Hundred Years of Educating at Savannah State College, 1890–1990. East Peoria, Ill.: Versa Press.

Academic offices
Preceded by James A. Colston	President of Georgia State College; 1949–1963	Succeeded by Howard Jordan, Jr.
