= Black Sports =

1970s African-American sports magazine

- The April 1976 cover featuring Julius Erving
- Frequency: Monthly
- Founder: Allan P. Barron
- First issue: April 1971; 55 years ago
- Final issue: June 1978; 47 years ago
- Country: United States
- Based in: New York City

Black Sports was a monthly sports magazine first published in April 1971 in New York City. It was the first major sports magazine aimed specifically at African Americans. The magazine was the brainchild of Allan P. Barron, who became president and editor. Barron teamed up with William L. Doneghy, who was vice-president and controller. In 1971, Bryant Gumbel became editor, leaving the following year. The magazine had low circulation and limited success and was forced to close after the final issue was published in June 1978.
