= Carlton E. Brown =

American academic administrator

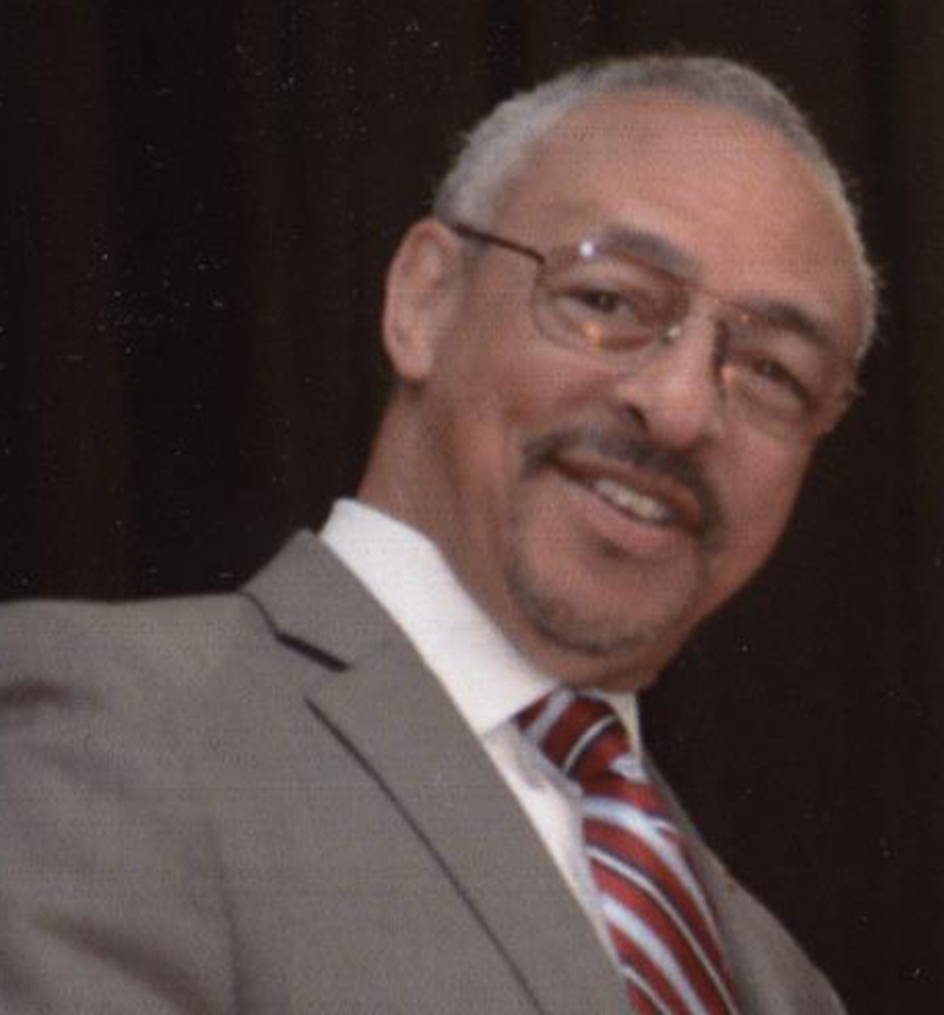
- Brown at Clark Atlanta University, 2013

3rd President of Clark Atlanta University
- In office August 10, 2008 – July 1, 2015
- Preceded by: Walter Broadnax
- Succeeded by: Ronald A. Johnson

President of Savannah State College
- In office 1997–2006
- Preceded by: John T. Wolfe Jr.
- Succeeded by: Earl G. Yarbrough

Personal details
- Born: Macon, Georgia, U.S.
- Spouse: T. LaVerne Ricks-Brown
- Education: University of Massachusetts
- Profession: Educator and academic administrator

Carlton E. Brown is an American retired academic administrator, educator, and university president. He was the third president of Clark Atlanta University in Atlanta, Georgia, a position served from August 1, 2008, until July 1, 2015. He also served as president of Savannah State University (SSU), from July 1, 1997, until December 31, 2006.

== Early life and education ==
Brown studied English (with an emphasis in American Studies) at the University of Massachusetts in Amherst, Massachusetts, graduating in 1971. He then returned to the University of Massachusetts for doctoral study. He completed his doctoral studies in 1979, earning the Ed.D. in Multicultural Education (emphases in educational change and organizational development).

Brown is married to T. LaVerne Ricks-Brown, a former teacher and a 1972 graduate of Hampton University. They have two children.

According to a DNA analysis, Brown's ancestry comes from the Yoruba people and Fulani people of Nigeria.

== Career ==
After completing his undergraduate education, Brown worked as a high school teacher and counselor for three years. While pursuing his doctoral degree, he served as a Program Planning Specialist and as a Program Development Specialist for the National Alternative Schools Program.

From 1979 until 1987 Brown served on the faculty of the School of Education of Old Dominion University in Norfolk, Virginia. In 1987, Dr. Brown was hired by Hampton University as the Dean of the School of Education. He engineered the creation of the School of Liberal Arts and Education at Hampton in 1990. In 1996, Brown was promoted to vice president for Planning and Dean of the Graduate College at Hampton.

=== President, Savannah State University ===
Brown became eleventh president of Savannah State University (SSU) on July 1, 1997, replacing John T. Wolfe Jr. His term as SSU's president ended on December 31, 2006.

=== President, Clark Atlanta University ===
Clark Atlanta University confirmed on February 15, 2008, that Walter Doyce Broadnax would officially retire on July 31, 2008, and that Brown, the university's executive vice president, would assume the duties as the interim president on August 1, 2008. On May 16, 2008, the Clark Atlanta Board of Trustees at its regular meeting, appointed Brown as the university's third president, effective August 1, 2008, and he served as president until 2015.

=== AGB Institutional Strategies ===
As of 2018, Brown is working with AGB Institutional Strategies, a higher-education consulting firm.

== Suggested reading ==
- Hall, Clyde W (1991). One Hundred Years of Educating at Savannah State College, 1890-1990. East Peoria, Illinois: Versa Press.

Academic offices
Preceded by John T. Wolfe Jr.	President of Savannah State College; 1997 — 2006	Succeeded by Earl G. Yarbrough
Preceded by Walter Broadnax	President of Clark Atlanta University; 2008 — 2015	Succeeded by Ronald A. Johnson
