= William E. Gardner Jr. =

President of Savannah State College
- In office 1989–1991
- Preceded by: Wendell G. Rayburn
- Succeeded by: John T. Wolfe Jr.

Personal details
- Born: March 19, 1939
- Died: April 15, 1991 (aged 52) Tybee Island, Georgia
- Profession: educator

William E. Gardner Jr. (March 13, 1939 – April 15, 1991) served as president of Savannah State College from 1989 until 1991.

== Biography ==
He was the ninth president of Savannah State College. His tenure as president saw unprecedented enrollment growth (13 percent) for the college and he successfully led the College to SACS accreditation. Additionally, he developed a plan to reestablish a teacher certification program at the college. He also established the $2.7 million Advanced Water Technology Institute and oversaw improvements to the physical plant and a $3 million addition to the student center.

During his tenure as president the college held the Centennial Celebration of Savannah State and the Adams Hall was restored and opened as the college’s archives facility. The Hill Hall Restoration Project was also established to provide $1.5 million external funding for the restoration of the historic campus building.

Dr. Gardner was also responsible for the replica of the U.S. Navy "Blue Angels" demonstration flying team jet flown by Donnie Cochran, being placed in front of the McGlockton NROTC Building.

== Death ==
Dr. William E. Gardner Jr. died in office in 1991. He was succeeded by Annette K. Brock.

== Legacy ==
The William E. Gardner Jr. Hall was named in honor and recognition of his published vision for Savannah State College and his immense popularity with the students.

== Suggested Reading ==
- Hall, Clyde W (1991). One Hundred Years of Educating at Savannah State College, 1890-1990. East Peoria, Ill.: Versa Press.

Academic offices
Preceded by Wendell G. Rayburn	President of Savannah State College; 1989 — 1991	Succeeded by John T. Wolfe Jr.
