= Wendell G. Rayburn =

President of Lincoln University
- In office 1988–1996
- Preceded by: Thomas Miller Jenkins
- Succeeded by: David B. Henson

President of Savannah State College
- In office 1980–1988
- Preceded by: Prince A. Jackson Jr.
- Succeeded by: William E. Gardner Jr.

Personal details
- Born: May 20, 1929 Detroit, Michigan, U.S.
- Died: December 27, 2016 (aged 87) Oak Park, Illinois, U.S.
- Education: Eastern Michigan University
- Profession: University president, academic administrator, educator

Wendell Gilbert Rayburn (May 20, 1929 – December 27, 2016) was an American educator, academic administrator, and university president. He served as president of Savannah State College from 1980 to 1988, and as president of Lincoln University from 1988 to 1996.

== Career ==
He attended Eastern Michigan University and graduated with a B.A. degree (1951).

From 1954 until 1968, Rayburn worked in public schools in Detroit as both an educator and an academic administrator. From 1968 until 1972, he worked as the assistant director of special projects at Detroit University (now University Liggett School).

Rayburn was the eighth president of Savannah State College. His administration implemented the Desegregation Plan mandated by the Georgia Board of Regents, and he led the institution through its first major building program since the 1970s. Buildings on the current campus completed during his term include the marine biology complex, the Jordan College of Business Administration, the president’s house (later named William E. Gardner Hall), and the Harris-McDew Health Services Center.

Rayburn resigned in 1988 to become president of Lincoln University in Jefferson City, Missouri.

Academic offices
Preceded by Prince A. Jackson, Jr.	President of Savannah State College; 1980–1988	Succeeded by William E. Gardner, Jr.
