= Association of Technology, Management, and Applied Engineering =

ATMAE logo

The Association of Technology, Management and Applied Engineering (ATMAE) (formerly known as the National Association of Industrial Technology) provides accreditation services for academic degree programs in technology, management, and applied engineering.

== Accreditation ==
ATMAE accredits academic programs in technology, applied engineering, and management-related fields, ensuring that institutions meet established educational standards. ATMAE accreditation is recognized by the Council for Higher Education Accreditation (CHEA). The accreditation process includes:

- Program self-study and evaluation
- On-site peer review visits
- Continuous improvement and compliance monitoring

ATMAE's CHEA Recognized Scope of Accreditation: ATMAE accredits associate, baccalaureate, and master degree programs in technology, technology management, applied technology, engineering technology, applied engineering, and technology-related disciplines delivered at nationally and regionally accredited institutions in the United States and institutions meeting the same standards internationally.

== Certification ==
ATMAE offers professional certification exams to validate skills and expertise in various technical and managerial areas, including:

- Certified Lean Six Sigma (CLSSYB, CLSSGB, CLSSBB, CLSSMBB) - designed for individuals with a strong background in quality, statistics, and lean philosophies. This certification is valuable across a wide range of industries including healthcare, construction, service, manufacturing, operations, office environments, higher education, and supply chain management.
- Certified Technology Manager (CTM & CSTM) (formerly called Certified Industrial Technologist, CIT & CSIT) - ideal for bachelor-level graduates and professionals with a focus on technology management.
- Certified Technical Professional (CTP & CSTP) - designed to serve graduates of both 2-Year and 4-Year programs. This certification is ideal for individuals from technical programs without a management component, resulting in either an associate (AS, AAS) degree or a baccalaureate (BS, BA) degree.
- Certified Manufacturing Specialist (CMS & CSMS) - designed for graduates of programs with a strong manufacturing emphasis, or those with equivalent work experience. This certification validates expertise and skills in a broad range of manufacturing processes and practices.
- Certified in Engineering Graphics (CEG & CSEG) - tailored for graduates from both 2-Year and 4-Year programs, aiming to validate skills in industrial design through engineering graphics. This certification covers a wide range of competencies, including geometric construction, orthographic views, and standardized annotations.
- Certified Controls Engineer (CCE & CSCE) - tailored for graduates of a 4-year degree in applied engineering, engineering technology, or related fields, focusing on industrial controls, automation, instrumentation, robotics, and more. It is designed for individuals who possess a balanced understanding of both application and theory, combining skills from technician and design engineering disciplines.
- Microelectro Mechanical Systems Foundation Certification (MFC) - tailored for students from 2-Year, 4-Year, and advanced secondary programs. This certification is ideal for individuals who have completed the nine MEMS Foundations online short courses offered by the Support Center for Microsystems Education (SCME).
