= Cyrus G. Wiley =

American educator and university administrator

Cyrus Gilbert Wiley
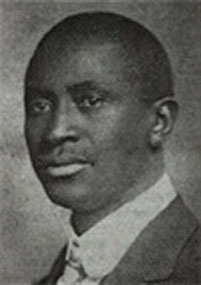
- Wiley in 1921

President of Georgia State Industrial College for Colored Youth
- In office 1921–1926
- Preceded by: Richard R. Wright
- Succeeded by: Benjamin F. Hubert

Personal details
- Born: August 13, 1881 Hilton Head Island, South Carolina
- Died: January 3, 1930 (aged 48) Atlanta, Georgia
- Education: Georgia State Industrial College for Colored Youth
- Profession: educator

Cyrus Gilbert Wiley (August 13, 1881 – January 3, 1930) served as president of Georgia State Industrial College for Colored Youth from 1921 and until 1926. He succeeded the first president, Richard R. Wright.

== Biography ==
=== Early life and education ===
Wiley attended Georgia State Industrial College for Colored Youth soon after its founding in 1891. He graduated in 1902.

=== President ===
Wiley succeeded Richard R. Wright as president of the college in 1921. During his term as president, the first female students were admitted as boarding students on the campus. Additionally, the college was established as a federal agricultural extension center.

== Legacy ==
The Willcox-Wiley Physical Education Complex, built in 1954 on the university's campus, is named in honor of Cyrus G. Wiley.

== Suggested reading ==
- Hall, Clyde W (1991). One Hundred Years of Educating at Savannah State College, 1890–1990. East Peoria, Ill.: Versa Press.

Academic offices
| Preceded by Richard R. Wright | President of Georgia State Industrial College for Colored Youth; 1921–1926 | Succeeded by Benjamin F. Hubert |
