= John T. Wolfe Jr. =

American higher education consultant and administrator (born 1942)

President of Savannah State College
- In office 1993–1997
- Preceded by: William E. Gardner Jr.
- Succeeded by: Carlton E. Brown

Personal details
- Born: February 22, 1942 (age 84) Jackson, Mississippi, U.S.
- Profession: Educator, academic administrator

John T. Wolfe Jr. is an American higher education consultant and retired administrator. He served as president of Kentucky State University from 1990 to 1991; and president of Savannah State College from 1993 until 1997.

== Early life and education ==
Wolfe was born in Mississippi and grew up in Chicago, Illinois. He graduated from St. Philip Basilica High School in Chicago, Illinois in 1960.

He earned a B.S. degree in education from Chicago Teachers College in 1964. In 1972 he earned an M.S. degree in English education from Purdue University in West Lafayette, Indiana. He later earned a Ph.D. in linguistics from Purdue University in 1976.

== Career ==
=== Fayetteville State University ===
In 1980, Wolfe was appointed Head for the Division of Humanities and Fine Arts at Fayetteville State University. He was named Assistant Dean of Academic Affairs following his internship as an ACE Fellow in the Chancellor's Office and in February 1985, Dr. Wolfe was named Acting Dean of Academic Affairs.

=== Bowie State University ===
Wolfe was Provost of Bowie State University from 1985 to June 30, 1990.

=== Kentucky State University ===
Wolfe was the 12th president of Kentucky State University, from 1990 until 1991. Wolfe's inauguration as university president was cancelled by the university's Board of Regents, and three regents resigned rather than approve his administrative appointments. Student leaders and the president of the state chapter of the National Association for the Advancement of Colored People called for the chairman of the board to resign for racial insensitivity, as the chairman was white and the administrators were Black. Wolfe resigned amid an investigation by the university Board of Regents into potential financial misconduct, who accused him of spending too much on the president's official house, mishandling some personnel matters and giving himself a 9.5 percent pay raise without board approval, in possible violation of his contract. Students marched on the Kentucky State Capitol in his support, due to wanting to preserve the university's status as a historically black institution and fear that if Mr. Wolfe were fired, the regents would move to change that mission. Wolfe reportedly tried to inaugurate Afro-centric programs during what observers said was a 'white takeover of the institution.'

=== Savannah State University ===
Wolfe was the tenth president of Savannah State College, which was renamed Savannah State University during his tenure. He served as president from 1993 to 1997. During his tenure, the Public Administration and Social Work graduate programs returned to the institution and Savannah State College was elevated by the Georgia Board of Regents to state university status. Wolfe also oversaw the highest enrollment in Savannah State's history, which grew to over 3,200 students during the 1994 and 1995 school years. He created the university's first Faculty Senate and secured $12 million to build a 5,000-seat athletic complex and $1 million for a new track and field facility. His support of grant writing led to a 100% increase in funded proposals during his time at Savannah State from $7.11 million to $14.3 million.

When he was hired, Wolfe was charged with improving management and accountability on campus. During that process, a number of popular Savannah employees were let go and locked out of their offices. Petitions, student protests, and a vote of no-confidence from faculty, staff and alumni followed.

After leading Savannah State University for four years, he requested not to be reappointed for another academic year, and accepted a position as Associate Vice Chancellor for Academic Affairs at the University System of Georgia's offices.

=== NCAA ===
In 1996, while president of Savannah State College, Wolfe was selected to serve as one of the NCAA's Division II Presidents Council Transition Team members along with 12 other chief executive officers.

=== University System of Maryland ===
Wolfe was appointed Associate Vice Chancellor for Academic Affairs at the University System of Maryland on January 3, 2006. His primary responsibility was to "articulate and promote the system's vision on diversity as outlined in the USM strategic plan" and to be the "primary point of contact on diversity issues on a national level and within the university system." In the position, he also played a role in developing both system academic policies and positions and academic leadership among all faculty at USM, and in coordinating workshops, seminars, and other system-sponsored programs.

Wolfe retired from the University System of Maryland in 2017 and soon after was invited to present at the University of Maryland, Baltimore, Diversity Advisory Council (DAC) Speaker Series, giving a talk entitled 'Managing Conflict: Cooperating and Collaborating Even When We Disagree". "Disruption is a part of life. You have to anticipate it," he shared, "I have been a disrupter. I have had to mediate and mitigate, and I found that in order to make diversity and inclusion work, you have to find a common ground."

== Published works ==
In 2015, Wolfe wrote a chapter focusing on diversity in Historically Black Colleges and Universities that was published in the book Exploring Issues of Diversity in HBCUs. In the book, Wolfe argues that, since many White institutions offer Black studies programs, HBCUs should offer Whiteness dialogue courses so students can "understand on many levels what White privilege is and how it affects their psychosocial, political, and economic well-being."

In 2020, Wolfe co-authored a chapter titled, "Examining Barriers to Minority Faculty Contributions in Higher Education" that was published in the book Disparities in the Academy: Accounting for the Elephant.

Wolfe has published work on topics including literary criticism, linguistics, career development, curriculum, English dialectology, diversity, and photography.

Wolfe is thanked by the producers in the credits of the film Dominica: Charting a Future for Paradise (2011), a short documentary about the history of the country of Dominica.

== Honors, decorations, awards, and distinctions ==
=== Fellowships ===
- National Endowment for the Humanities
- American Council on Education
- Gulf Oil Faculty Forum

=== Professional accomplishments ===
- Founder and principal at Avant-Garde Higher Education Services and Solutions, Inc.
- Executive director (1991–1993) - Rainbow PUSH Coalition
- Co-chair of the Washington Regional Taskforce Against Campus Prejudice
- President of the Higher Education Group of Washington, D.C.
- Associate vice chancellor for Academic Leadership Development and Diversity, University System of Maryland (USM)
- President of the Black Caucus, National Council of Teachers of English

=== Honors ===
- Honoree, 1991 - Old Master by Old Masters Program, Purdue University
- Inductee - Washington, D.C. Urban League's Senior Hall of Fame

== Suggested reading ==
- Hall, Clyde W (1991). One Hundred Years of Educating at Savannah State College, 1890-1990. East Peoria, Ill.: University of Florida Press.

Academic offices
Preceded by William E. Gardner Jr.	President of Savannah State College; 1993 — 1997	Succeeded by Carlton E. Brown
