= Benjamin F. Hubert =

- Hubert pictured in The Hubertonian 1947, Savannah State yearbook

President of Georgia State College
- In office 1932–1947
- Preceded by: Office established
- Succeeded by: James A. Colston

President of the Georgia State Industrial College for Colored Youth
- In office 1926–1932
- Preceded by: Cyrus G. Wiley
- Succeeded by: Office abolished

Personal details
- Born: December 25, 1884 Hancock County, Georgia, U.S.
- Died: April 29, 1958 (aged 73) Atlanta, Georgia, U.S.
- Education: Atlanta Baptist College; Massachusetts Agricultural College
- Profession: Educator

Benjamin Franklin Hubert (December 25, 1884 – April 29, 1958) served as president of Georgia State Industrial College for Colored Youth continuing when it became Georgia State College from 1926 until 1947. It is now Savannah State University.

== Biography ==
According to his New York Times obituary, Hubert was born on December 25, 1884, to Zach and Camilla Hubert. His parents were African-American farmers who owned several hundred acres of land in the northern part of Hancock County, Georgia. The Huberts were surrounded by a dozen other black farm-owning families. Their small community, called Springfield, built a church, a general store, and a rudimentary four-year, elementary grade school.

To educate their children further, the Huberts sent the oldest children away to board in nearby schools. They sent all twelve of their children to college. After the oldest graduated from college, Zach Hubert called him home to expand and develop the local school to include higher grades, through high school. As the sixth child, Benjamin Hubert benefited from this expansion. Like his brothers, he attended Atlanta Baptist (later known as Morehouse College), a private historically black college (HBCU) founded by the American Missionary Association after the Civil War. Hubert earned a high school diploma here before graduating with a B.A. in 1909.

Afterward, he enrolled in the agricultural science program at Massachusetts Agricultural College, where he studied under Kenyon Butterfield, a founder of rural sociology. Butterfield was a member of the Country Life Commission organized by President Theodore Roosevelt. In 1919 Butterfield was elected as the first president of the American Country Life Association. This was highly influential for Hubert. At a time when many people were moving from rural to urban areas, there was national concern about maintaining family farms.

For the rest of his life, Hubert was involved in the Country Life Movement, which sought to find ways to make rural life more attractive to young people. They were taught scientific farming, establishing cooperatives for the community and their economy, and improving rural social institutions. This movement later informed the early agenda of agricultural extension in the U.S. Department of Agriculture. White agents began agricultural extension work in 1902; black agents were hired beginning in 1915.

In 1912, Hubert took a position as professor of agriculture at South Carolina State Agricultural and Mechanical College at Orangeburg; (it has developed as South Carolina State University). He soon became director of Agricultural Extension at the college, and director of the agricultural department.

At the outbreak of World War I, Hubert served on the South Carolina Food Administration Board. He went overseas to help direct the agricultural reconstruction of Europe.

Upon returning to the U.S. in 1920, Hubert accepted the directorship of the Department of Agriculture at Tuskegee Institute. He soon became supervisor of the Negro Division of the Agricultural Extension Service for Alabama. There, he made contacts with the philanthropists who would help him in his next position as president of a small, struggling black college in Savannah, Georgia.

=== President ===
In 1926 Hubert succeeded Cyrus G. Wiley as president of Georgia State Industrial College for Colored Youth, the first public historically black college (HBCU) in the state. Under his leadership, he developed the college and its curriculum as a full-time, four-year degree-granting institution. He disestablished the programs for high school classes and normal school training. In 1932 the school became a full-member institution of the University System of Georgia. Its name was changed to Georgia State College that same year.

Hubert used the college's relative proximity to Hancock County, Georgia, to attempt an experiment in rural community building, along the themes of the Country Life Movement. In 1928, he organized the Association for the Advancement of Negro Country Life. With backing from northern philanthropists, he worked to transform Springfield into a model black community, blending Butterfield's progressive rural idealism, the economic separatism of Marcus Garvey, and the pragmatism of Booker T. Washington. Under Hubert's guidance, the community organized a community health clinic, a cooperative community center, complete with swimming pool; and a cooperative dairy and an enclosed poultry house. To maximize market efficiency, they bought seed and machinery cooperatively, and sold their agricultural products cooperatively. They attracted outstanding faculty to the high school and expanded it with grants from the Julius Rosenwald Foundation. At its height, eighty percent of the graduates of this high school continued to college. Hubert used the community to host teacher training institutes for African-American teachers in Georgia.

In the end, these efforts were not enough to withstand the market forces that were pushing out small farmers. In addition, the educational success of students from this county led many of them to look elsewhere for work and opportunities. College graduates from Springfield began to look for professional employment in the cities, not on the farms. Many African Americans had already joined the Great Migration from rural Georgia and the South, to escape Jim Crow laws and its second-class status. Most blacks in the state were still prevented from voting because of Georgia's discriminatory laws and practices.

In 1947, Hubert retired from Georgia State College due to tensions over his autocratic administrative style. A couple of years later, he suffered a debilitating stroke. Hubert died on April 30, 1958.

== Legacy ==
The Benjamin F. Hubert Technical Science Center on the university's campus houses the school's chemistry, computer science, and engineering departments and classrooms. His photograph accompanied by words of trobute appear in a 1939 Hubertonian yearbook.

== Suggested reading ==
- Hall, Clyde W (1991). One Hundred Years of Educating at Savannah State College, 1890–1990. East Peoria, Ill.:Versa Press.
- Schultz, Mark, "Benjamin Hubert and the Association for the Advancement of Negro Country Life," in Beyond Forty Acres and a Mule: African American Landowning Families Since Reconstruction. Gainesville: University Press of Florida, 2012, 83-105.
- Schultz, Mark. "A More Satisfying Life on the Farm: Benjamin F. Hubert and the Log Cabin Community," M.A. thesis, University of Georgia, 1989.

Academic offices
Preceded by Cyrus G. Wiley	President of Georgia State Industrial College for Colored Youth; 1926–1947	Succeeded by James A. Colston
