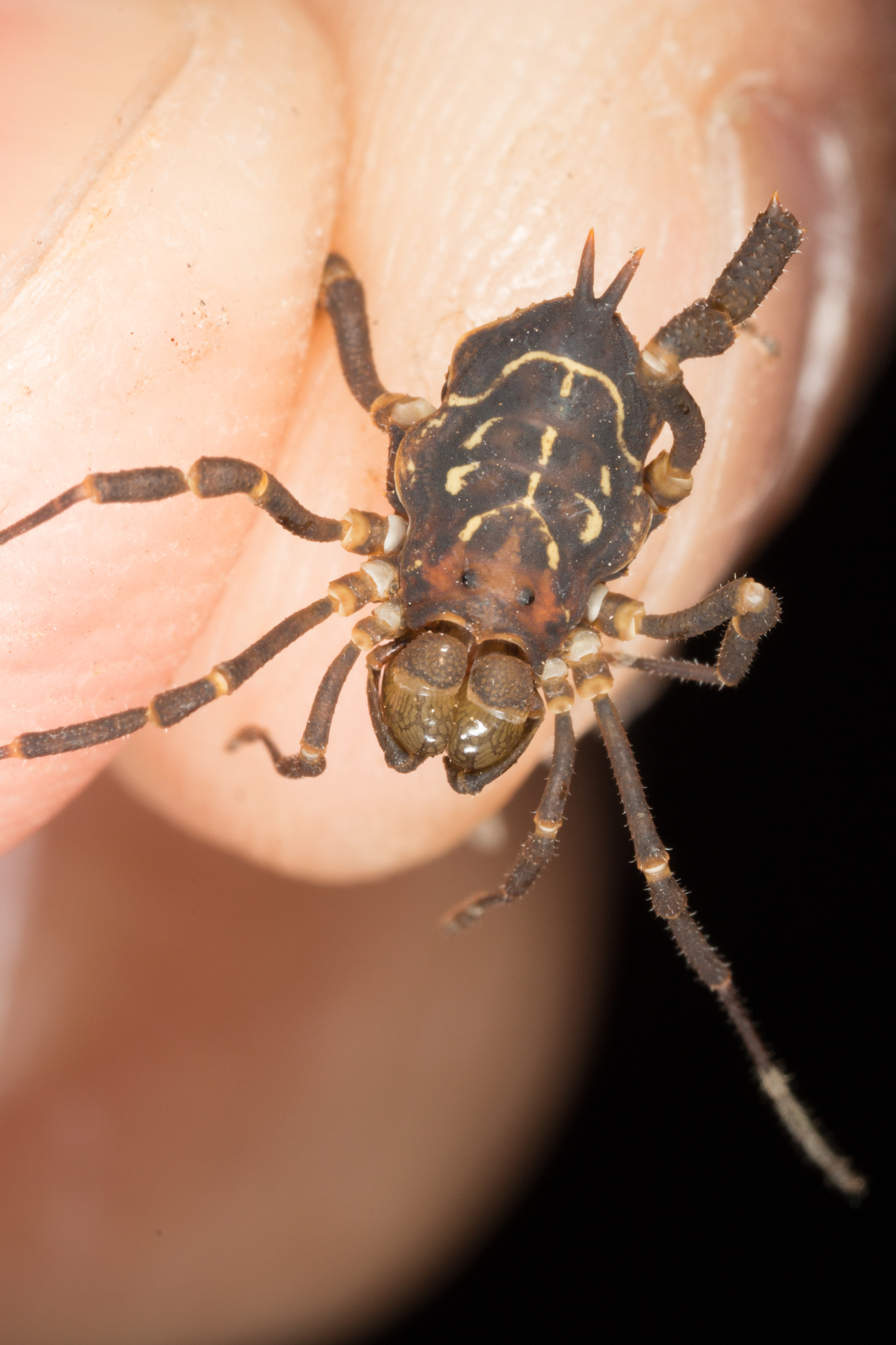
- Arucillus armasi

Scientific classification
- Domain: Eukaryota
- Kingdom: Animalia
- Phylum: Arthropoda
- Subphylum: Chelicerata
- Class: Arachnida
- Order: Opiliones
- Family: Cosmetidae
- Subfamily: Metergininae
- Genus: Arucillus; Šilhavý, 1971

Type species
- Arucillus hispaniolicus Šilhavý, 1971

Diversity
- 2 spp. (see text)

= Arucillus =

Genus of harvestmen/daddy longlegs

Arucillus is a genus of harvestmen in the family Cosmetidae with two described species (as of early 2025). All species are from Central America or South America. An overview of the wider phylogeny was stated by Medrano et al. (2024) favoring a placement in Metergininae but acknowledging that Arucillus appeared among Libitiinae in all other analyses, in some cases appearing allied to some externally similar species from Mexico and Antilles, those currently in the genera Holovonones and Vonones.

== Description ==
The genus Arucillus was described by Šilhavý, 1971 with the type species Arucillus hispaniolicus Šilhavý, 1971. The genus was later included in the subfamily Metergininae.

== Species ==
These species belong to the genus Arucillus:

- Arucillus armasi Pérez-González & Vasconcelos, 2003 – Hispanola (Dominican Republic)
- Arucillus hispaniolicus Šilhavý, 1971 – Hispanola (Dominican Republic)

== Etymology ==
The genus is masculine. Genus name origin is uncertain, but may derive from modification of Loma Rucilla (the type locality) + masculine Latin suffix -us.
