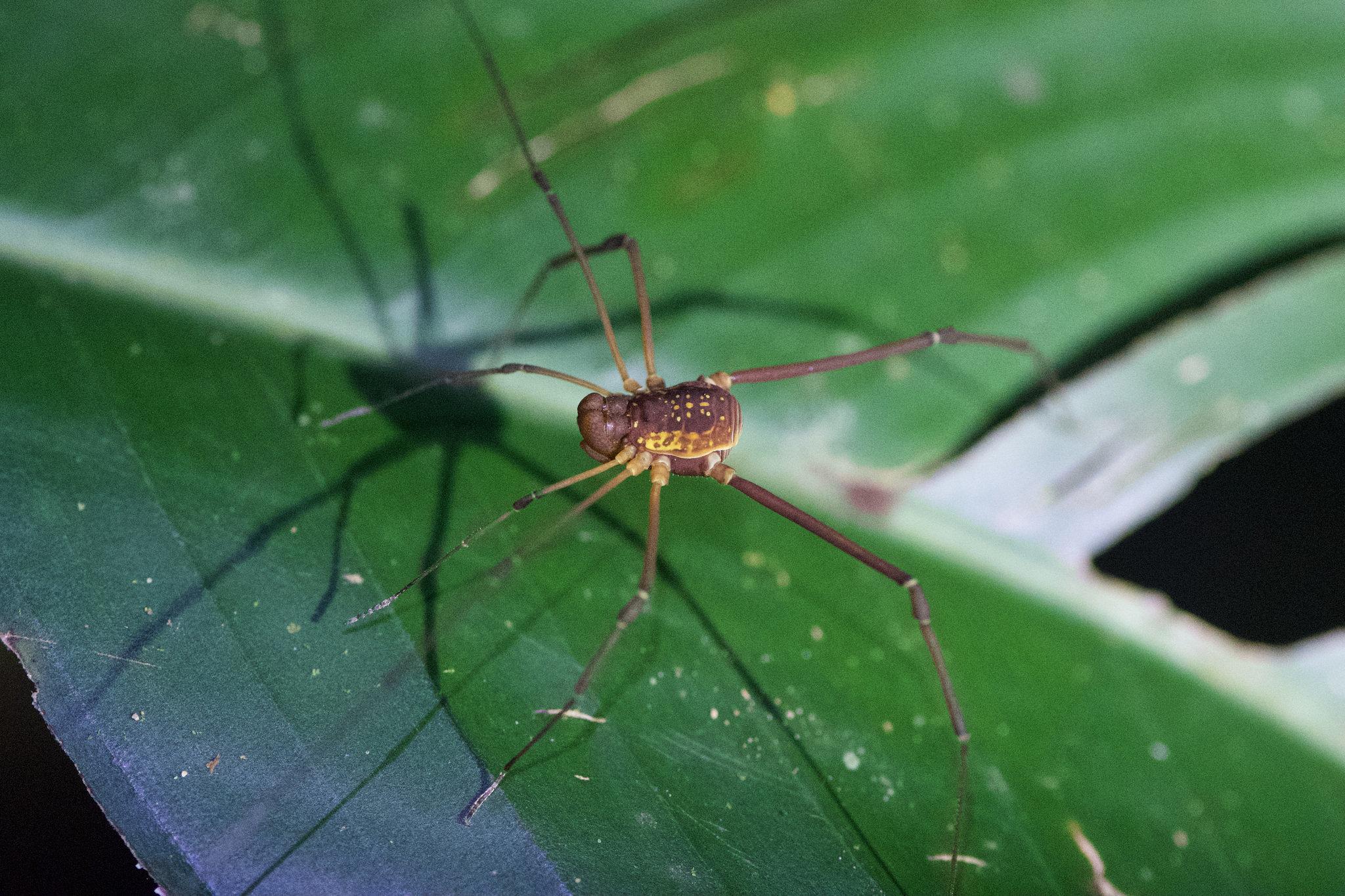

Scientific classification
- Domain: Eukaryota
- Kingdom: Animalia
- Phylum: Arthropoda
- Subphylum: Chelicerata
- Class: Arachnida
- Order: Opiliones
- Family: Cosmetidae
- Subfamily: Metergininae
- Genus: Poecilaemula
- Species: P. eutypa

Binomial name
- Poecilaemula eutypa (Chamberlin, 1925)

Synonyms
- Meterginoides eutypa Chamberlin, 1925; Paecilaemella eutypa (Chamberlin, 1925) in Goodnight & Goodnight, 1947; Paecilaema eutypta (Chamberlin, 1925) in Goodnight & Goodnight, 1953 (incorrect subsequent spelling); Paecilaema eutypa (Chamberlin, 1925) in Kury 2003; Paecilaema eutypum (Chamberlin, 1925) in Kury & Alonso-Zarazaga 2011

= Poecilaemula eutypa =

Species of arachnids

Poecilaemula eutypa is a species of harvestman from Central America in the family Cosmetidae. It was first described by Ralph Vary Chamberlin in 1925.

It was transferred to the current name combination of Poecilaemula eutypa (Chamberlin, 1925) by Medrano et al. (2024)

== Distribution ==
It is only known from the vicinity of the Panama Canal, in Panama.
