= Taito (harvestman) =

Scientific classification
- Domain: Eukaryota
- Kingdom: Animalia
- Phylum: Arthropoda
- Subphylum: Chelicerata
- Class: Arachnida
- Order: Opiliones
- Family: Cosmetidae
- Subfamily: Cosmetinae
- Genus: Taito; Kury & Barros, 2014

Type species
- Taito spaceinvaders Kury & Barros, 2014

Species
- 15, see text

Genus of harvestmen

Taito is a genus of harvestmen in the family Cosmetidae. The genus is endemic to the Amazon Basin in Brazil, Colombia, Ecuador and Peru.

== Taxonomy ==
The genus is named for the Japanese video game company Taito because the colorful body marks of the species in this genus resemble the aliens from their Space Invaders video game. The type species of the genus, Taito spaceinvaders, is named for the game as well. Another species is named for the similar 1981 game, Galaga.

Some species in this genus were formerly placed in Cynortula, Eucynortella, and Cynorta; however, the general taxonomy of Cosmetidae is poorly known and so most genera are monotypic genera or wastebin taxa. These species were moved to Taito largely based on morphological evidence.

== Species ==
There are currently 15 described species in Taito:

- Taito adrik Friedrich & Lehmann, 2020
- Taito galaga Kury & Barros, 2014
- Taito honda Kury & Barros, 2014
- Taito insperatus (Soares, 1970)
- Taito juruensis (Mello-Leitão, 1923)
- Taito kakera Kury & Barros, 2014
- Taito kawaiikei Kury & Barros, 2014
- Taito litteratus (Soares, 1970)
- Taito medinae Kury & Barros, 2014
- Taito oblongatus (Roewer, 1928)
- Taito osmari Kury & Barros, 2014
- Taito rorschachi Kury & Barros, 2014
- Taito serriperna (Mello-Leitão, 1932)
- Taito spaceinvaders Kury & Barros, 2014
- Taito unapunctatus (Goodnight & Goodnight, 1943)
