= Myron of Crete =

Archbishop of Crete, ~250-350

Myron
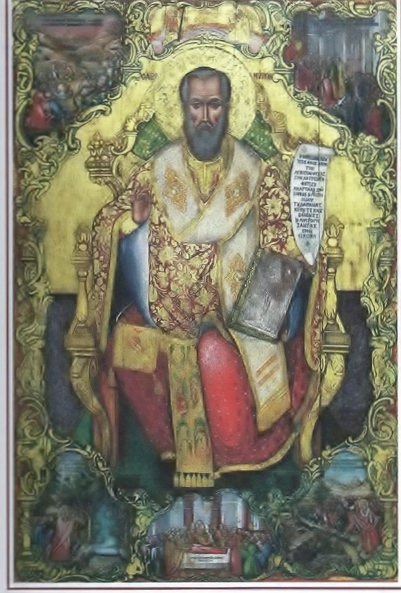

Archbishop of Crete
- Born: c. 250; Aurakia
- Hometown: Rhaukos
- Residence: Crete
- Died: 350 (aged 99–100)
- Feast: August 8
- Major works: Miracle worker

Myron of Crete, called Saint Myron the Wonder Worker (Greek: Άγιος Μύρων ο Θαυματουργός), was a bishop from Rhaukos, Crete who became archbishop of Crete. He is said to have been born in Aurakia, near Knossos, to have flourished during the reign of Decius (3rd century), and have died in 350, at the age of 100 years. He was a farmer and "very charitable to the poor". Although he is called a holy martyr, he apparently "died a natural and quiet death".

One story told about his generosity recounts that he surprised thieves who had broken in to his threshing floor, and then helped them lift a sack of grain on their shoulders, which shamed the thieves to the point that they began to lead honorable lives. One of many miracles he was said to have performed was to stop a flood of the Triton River and walk on it "as upon dry land".

The village of Rhaukos was renamed Agios Myron 'Saint Myron' in his honor. The Holy Neot (9th century) named a village in Cornwall for him, as well as Eynesbury, Huntingdonshire, which purportedly had acquired the body of the saint about 100 years after his death.

Myron is venerated on August 8.

== Other saints named Myron ==
- Marcellus, Dasius, and Myro, martyrs venerated on July 18.
- A Cretan New Martyr killed in 1793 for refusing to convert to Islam. Venerated on March 20.
