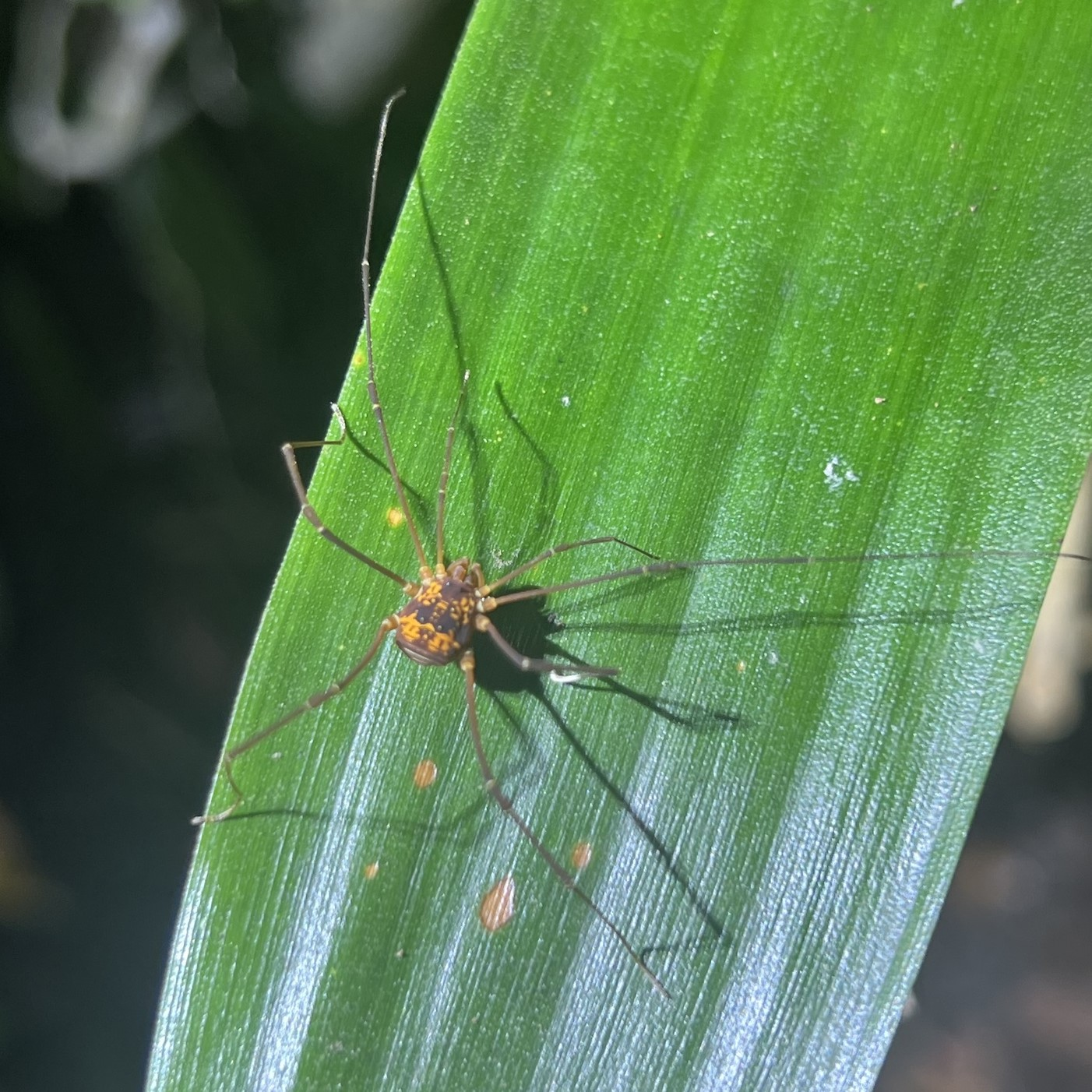

Scientific classification
- Kingdom: Animalia
- Phylum: Arthropoda
- Subphylum: Chelicerata
- Class: Arachnida
- Order: Opiliones
- Family: Cosmetidae
- Subfamily: Metergininae
- Genus: Poecilaemula
- Species: P. iching

Binomial name
- Poecilaemula iching Medrano, Kury, Martins & Proud, 2024

= Poecilaemula iching =

Species of harvestman/daddy longlegs

Poecilaemula iching is a species of harvestmen in the family Cosmetidae. It was first described in 2024 by Medrano, Kury, Martins, and Proud.

== Distribution ==
It is only known from Central America the vicinity of Bocas del Toro, Panama.
