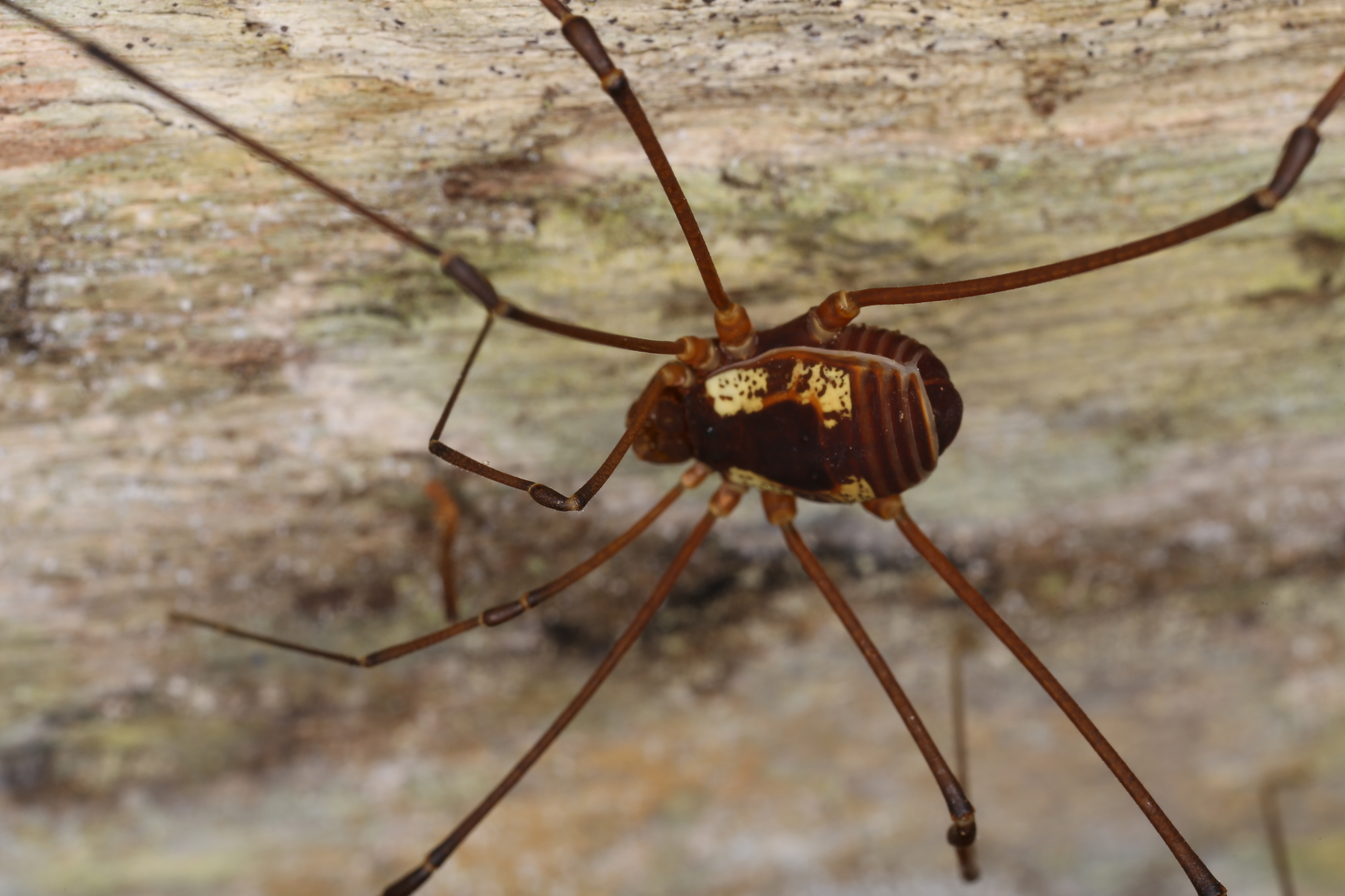

Scientific classification
- Kingdom: Animalia
- Phylum: Arthropoda
- Subphylum: Chelicerata
- Class: Arachnida
- Order: Opiliones
- Family: Cosmetidae
- Subfamily: Metergininae
- Genus: Poecilaemula
- Species: P. signata

Binomial name
- Poecilaemula signata (Banks, 1909)

Synonyms
- List: Meterginus signatus Banks, 1909; Poecilaemula signatum (Banks, 1909); Paecilaemula signata (Banks, 1909); Poecilaemula signata (Banks, 1909); Paecilaemana reimoseri Roewer, 1933

= Poecilaemula signata =

Species of arachnids

Poecilaemula signata is a species of harvestman in the family Cosmetidae found in Central America. It was first described by Nathan Banks in 1909.

It was transferred to the current name combination of Poecilaemula signata (Banks, 1909) by Roewer (1912) [see Etymology below].

== Distribution ==
It is only known from the vicinity of Limón, Costa Rica.

== Etymology ==
The original name Meterginus signatus Banks 1909 was revised as Poecilaemula signatum (Banks 1909) by Roewer in 1912. The suffix of the species epithet was subsequently altered (inflected to the feminine for gender agreement with this feminine genus) as Paecilaemula signata in Roewer 1923. However, here then used a variant (mis)spelling of the genus, which was then repeated by several later authors. The current formation as Poecilaemula signata (Banks 1909) is then stated in the "Catalog of Laniatores" by Kury, 2003, since used in further revision by Medrano et al. (2024). Furthermore, the taxon Paecilaemana reimoseri Roewer 1933 was proposed as a junior subjective synonym by Medrano et al. (2024)
