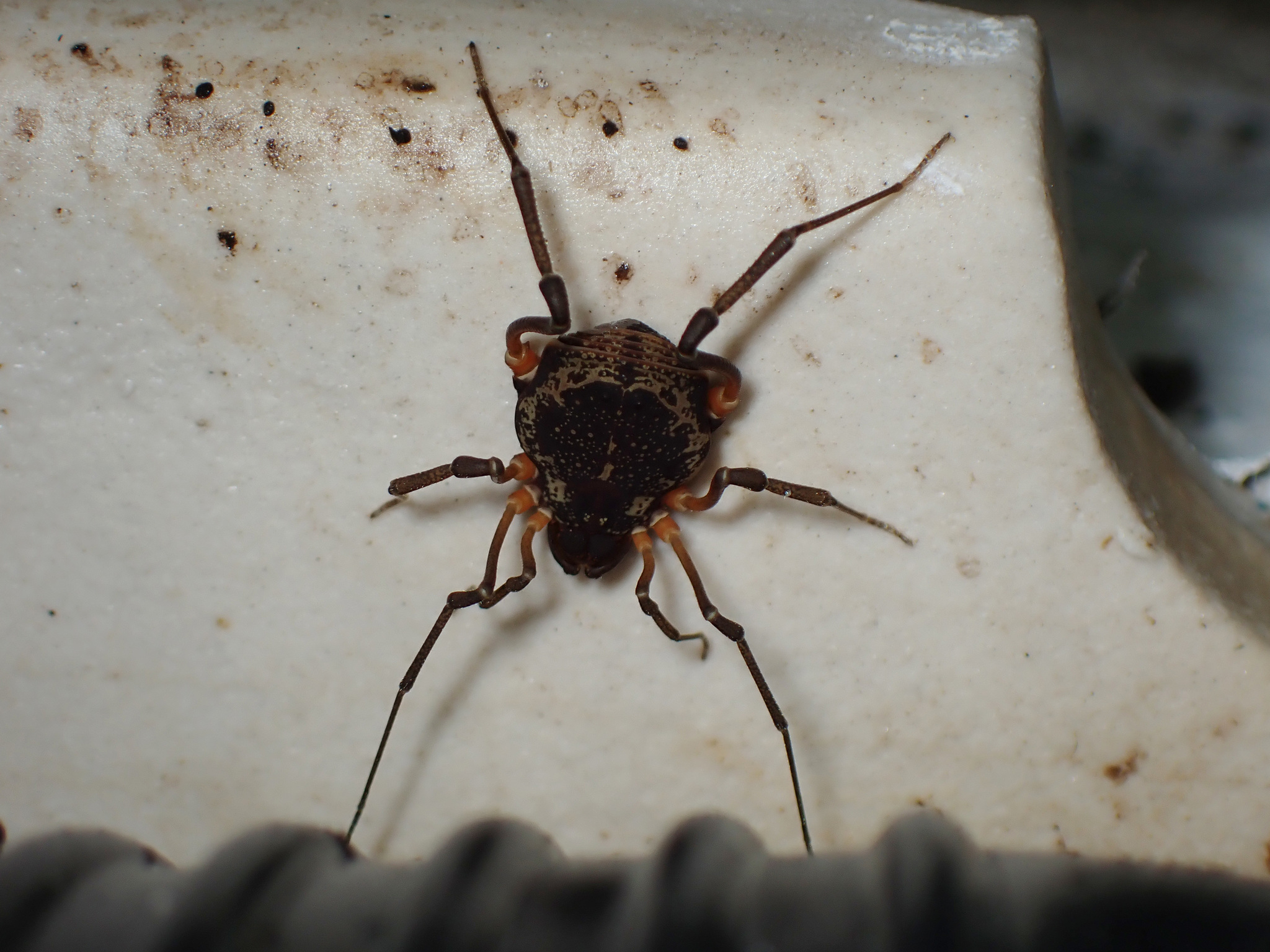

Scientific classification
- Kingdom: Animalia
- Phylum: Arthropoda
- Subphylum: Chelicerata
- Class: Arachnida
- Order: Opiliones
- Family: Cosmetidae
- Genus: Acromares; Goodnight, 1942

= Acromares =

Genus of harvestmen/daddy longlegs

Acromares is a genus of harvestmen from the subfamily Cosmetinae.

== Taxonomy ==
The genus Acromares has the following species

- Acromares banksi
- Acromares lateralis
- Acromares roeweri
- Acromares vittatum
