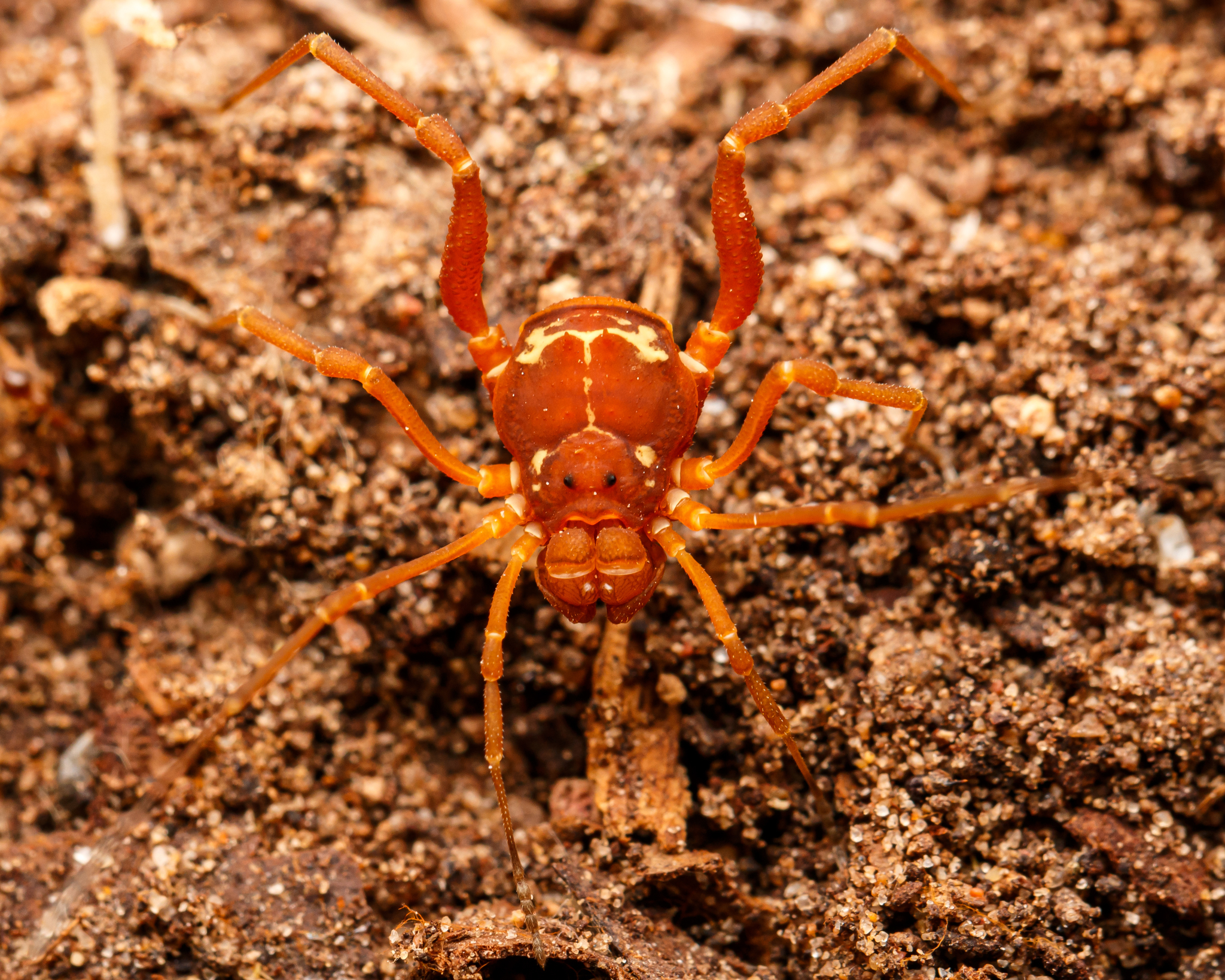
- "Cynorta triangulata"

Scientific classification
- Kingdom: Animalia
- Phylum: Arthropoda
- Subphylum: Chelicerata
- Class: Arachnida
- Order: Opiliones
- Family: Cosmetidae
- Subfamily: Cynortinae; Koch, 1839

Genera
- See text

= Cynortinae =

Subfamily of arachnids (harvestmen/daddy longlegs)

Cynortinae is a subfamily of harvestmen in the family Cosmetidae.

== Description ==
The subfamily was defined within Cosmetidae

== Taxonomy ==
The subfamily includes the following genera:

- Cynorta Koch, 1839
- Cynortoides Roewer, 1912
- Eucynorta Roewer, 1912
- Holovonones Roewer, 1912
- Metagryne Roewer, 1912
- Vonones Simon, 1879
