= Rhauculus =

Scientific classification
- Domain: Eukaryota
- Kingdom: Animalia
- Phylum: Arthropoda
- Subphylum: Chelicerata
- Class: Arachnida
- Order: Opiliones
- Superfamily: Gonyleptoidea
- Family: Cosmetidae
- Subfamily: Metergininae
- Genus: Rhauculus; Roewer, 1928

Type species
- Rhauculus insignitus Roewer, 1928

Diversity
- 6 spp. (see text)

Synonyms
- None

Genus of harvestmen/daddy longlegs

Rhauculus is a genus of harvestmen in the family Cosmetidae with six described species (as of early 2025). All species are from South America.

== Description ==
The genus Rhauculus was described by Roewer, 1928 with the type species Rhaucoides ornatus (Roewer, 1928).

== Species ==
These species belong to the genus Rhaucoides:

- Rhauculus conspicuus (Roewer, 1928) – Ecuador
- Rhauculus insignitus Roewer, 1928 – Ecuador
- Rhauculus lojanus (Roewer, 1912) – Ecuador
- Rhauculus ohausi (Roewer, 1912) – Ecuador (doubtful Brazil).
- Rhauculus serrifemur (Roewer, 1928) – Ecuador, Peru
- Rhauculus unicolor (Roewer, 1957) – Peru

== Etymology ==
The genus is masculine. Genus name derives from the pre-existing genus Rhaucus + masculine form of the diminutive Latin suffix -ulus.
