= Taitoinae =

Scientific classification
- Kingdom: Animalia
- Phylum: Arthropoda
- Subphylum: Chelicerata
- Class: Arachnida
- Order: Opiliones
- Family: Cosmetidae
- Subfamily: Taitoinae; Medrano, Kury & Mendes, 2021

Genera
- See text

Subfamily of arachnids (harvestmen/daddy longlegs)

Taitoinae is a subfamily of harvestmen in the family Cosmetidae.

== Description ==
The subfamily was defined within Cosmetidae

== Taxonomy ==
The subfamily includes the following genera:

- Acritas Sørensen, 1932
- Chinchipea Roewer, 1952
- Chirinosbius Roewer, 1952
- Chusgonobius Roewer, 1952
- Cynortoplus Roewer, 1925
- Cynortopyga Roewer, 1947
- Eucynortella Roewer, 1912
- Pygocynorta Roewer, 1925
- Taito Kury & Barros, 2014
- Vononana Roewer, 1928
- Vononoides Roewer, 1912
