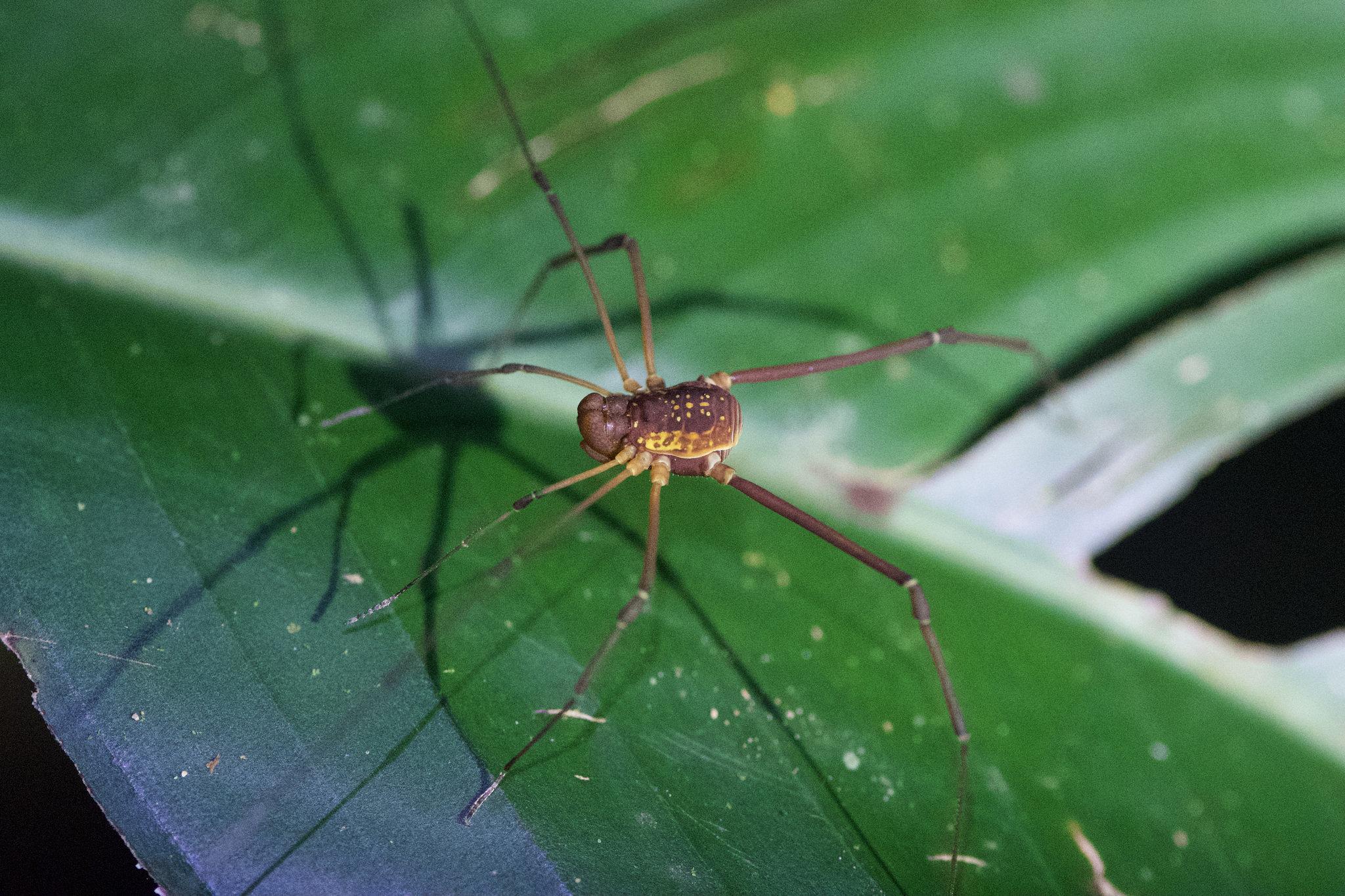
- Poecilaemula eutypa in Panama

Scientific classification
- Domain: Eukaryota
- Kingdom: Animalia
- Phylum: Arthropoda
- Subphylum: Chelicerata
- Class: Arachnida
- Order: Opiliones
- Superfamily: Gonyleptoidea
- Family: Cosmetidae
- Subfamily: Metergininae
- Genus: Poecilaemula; Roewer, 1912

Type species
- Meterginus signatus Banks, 1909

Diversity
- 8 spp. (see text)

Synonyms
- None (but see “Paecilaemula” Roewer, 1915).

= Poecilaemula =

Genus of harvestmen/daddy longlegs

Poecilaemula is a genus of harvestmen in the family Cosmetidae with eight described species (as of early 2024). All species are from Central America or South America. An overview of the taxonomy was provided by Medrano et al. (2024)

== Description ==
The genus Poecilaemula was described by Roewer, 1912 with the type species Poecilaemula signata (Banks, 1909). The South American species require further revision to re-assess their taxonomic placement.

== Species ==
These species belong to the genus Poecilaemula:

- Poecilaemula eutypa (Chamberlin, 1925) – Panama
- Poecilaemula iching Medrano, Kury, Martins & Proud, 2024 – Panama
- Poecilaemula lavarrei Goodnight & Goodnight, 1942 – Guyana
- Poecilaemula metatarsalis Roewer, 1915 – Venezuela
- Poecilaemula moniliata Roewer, 1928 – Ecuador
- Poecilaemula peruviana Roewer, 1947 – Peru
- Poecilaemula signata (Banks, 1909) – Costa Rica
- Poecilaemula smaragdula Mello-Leitão, 1941 – Brazil (Espírito Santo)

== Etymology ==
The genus is feminine. Genus name derives from an altered spelling of pre-existing genus Paecilaema + feminine form of Latin suffix -ulus.
