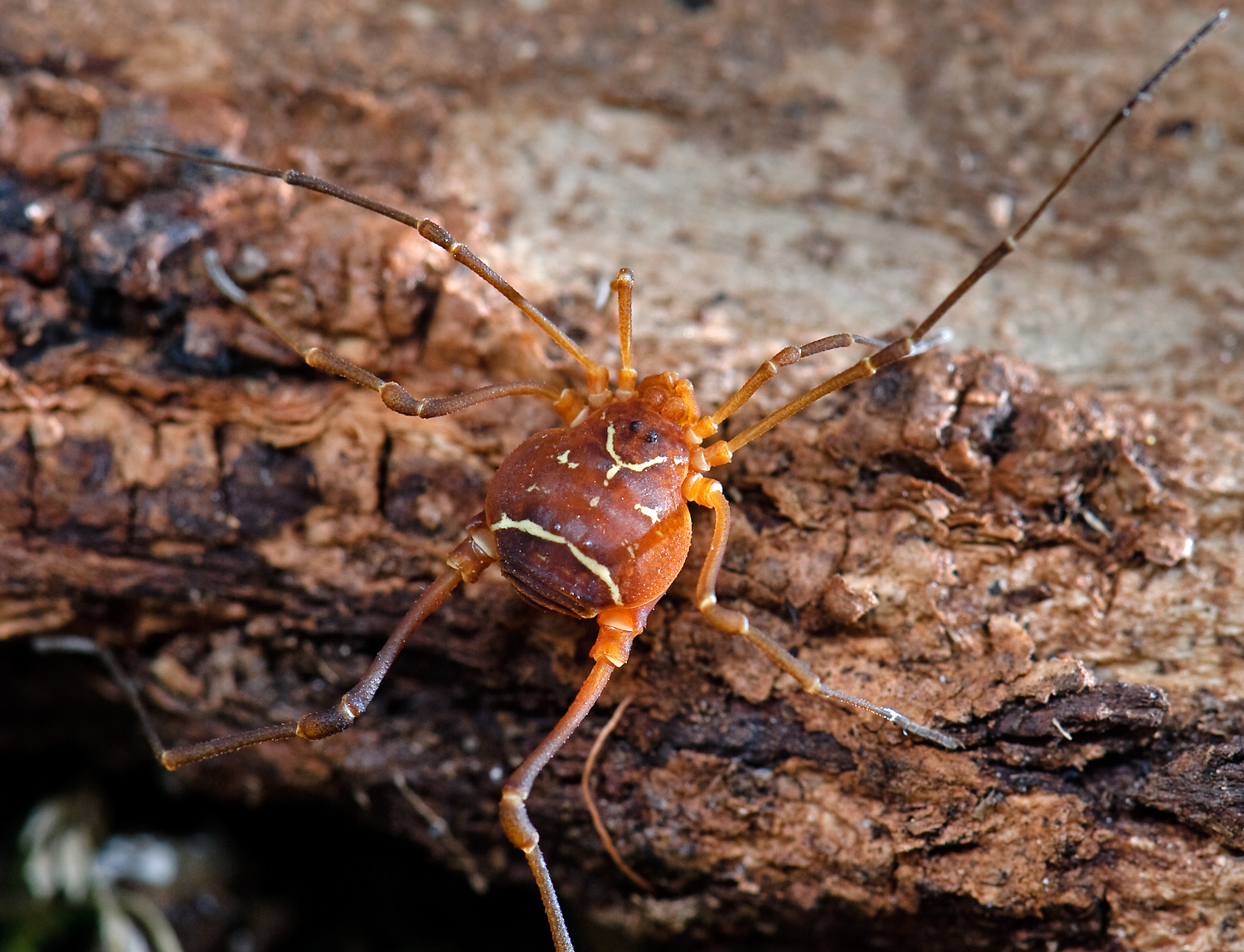

Scientific classification
- Kingdom: Animalia
- Phylum: Arthropoda
- Subphylum: Chelicerata
- Class: Arachnida
- Order: Opiliones
- Family: Cosmetidae
- Genus: Vonones
- Species: V. sayi

Binomial name
- Vonones sayi (Simon, 1879)

= Vonones sayi =

Species of harvestman/daddy longlegs

Vonones sayi is a species of armoured harvestman in the family Cosmetidae. It is found in North America.
