= Triton River (disambiguation) =

Triton River most commonly refers to the Triton River in Boeotia, Greece, and draining into Lake Copais.

Triton River may also refer to:

- the ancient name of the Giophyros River in Crete
- a river that was assumed by Herodotus to be the source of Lake Tritonis in ancient Africa
