= Agios Myronas =

Village near Heraklion, Crete

Agios Myronas Άγιος Μύρωνας
- Community
- Location within Greece
- Coordinates: 35°13′55″N 25°01′45″E
- Country: Greece
- Administrative region: Crete
- Regional unit: Heraklion
- Municipality: Heraklion
- Municipal unit: Gorgolainis

Population (2021)
  - Community: 569
- Time zone: UTC+2 (EET)
  - Summer (DST): UTC+3 (EEST)

Agios Myronas (Greek: Άγιος Μύρωνας, formerly Άγιος Μύρων Agios Myron) is a village in the Heraklion regional unit of Crete, Greece, named for Saint Myron of Crete. In 2021, its population was 569.

Agios Myronas is built on two hills. The school's clock tower is a familiar landmark in the region. Most residents are farmers producing raisins and wine.

== History ==
The ancient name of Agios Myronas was Ραύκος (Raukos, latinized as Rhaucus). There are archaeological finds dating as early as 1900 BCE in the Archaeological Museum of Heraklion. A chamber tomb of the Late Minoan IIIa period was discovered in 1941.

The modern name comes from Saint Myron the Wonderworker (c. 250-350), born in Raukos, who became a bishop of Gortyna.

The first attestation of the name is in a contract from 1281.

In 1837, its population consisted of 70 families, of which 3 were Muslim. The village was known for its wine.

Under the late Ottoman Empire, several natives of Agios Myron participated in resistance to Ottoman rule, including in the Macedonian Struggle, the Theriso revolt, and the Balkan Wars.

The village was completely rebuilt after being destroyed by an earthquake in 1856.

Until the Kallikratis reorganization of 2011, it was the seat of the Municipal Unit of Gorgolainis within the Province (Επαρχία) of Malevizi, which included Ano Asites, Kato Asites, Pentamodi, Petrokefalo, and Pyrgou.

== Facilities ==
The church of Saint Myron sits in a prominent position, and contains relics of the saint. Below the church is the skete where Myron is said to have worshipped, now a chapel. The village also has a primary school, a middle school, a secondary school, a police station, a post office, and an office of the Agia Varvara health center.

== Bibliography ==
- Το Ηράκλειον και ο Νομός του (Heraklion and its region), published by the Prefecture of Heraklion
