= Vonones =

Vonones was the name of three kings of the ancient Middle East:

- Vonones of Sakastan, ruled c. 75–57 BC
- Vonones I, ruled c. AD 8–12
- Vonones II, ruled c. AD 51

It is also used in zoology:

- Vonones (harvestman), a genus of harvestmen in the family Cosmetidae
