= Neokayania bicolumnata =

Scientific classification
- Kingdom: Animalia
- Phylum: Arthropoda
- Subphylum: Chelicerata
- Class: Arachnida
- Order: Opiliones
- Family: Cosmetidae
- Genus: Neokayania
- Species: N. bicolumnata

Binomial name
- Neokayania bicolumnata (Roewer, 1959)

Synonyms
- Metagryne bicolumnata; Kayania bicolumnata

Species of harvestmen

Neokayania bicolumnata, commonly called the bunny harvestman, is a scarce species of harvestmen found in Ecuador. It is notable for its horn-like projections on its prosoma, noted to resemble "rabbit ears". Their function, along with other details about its biology, is still unknown.
