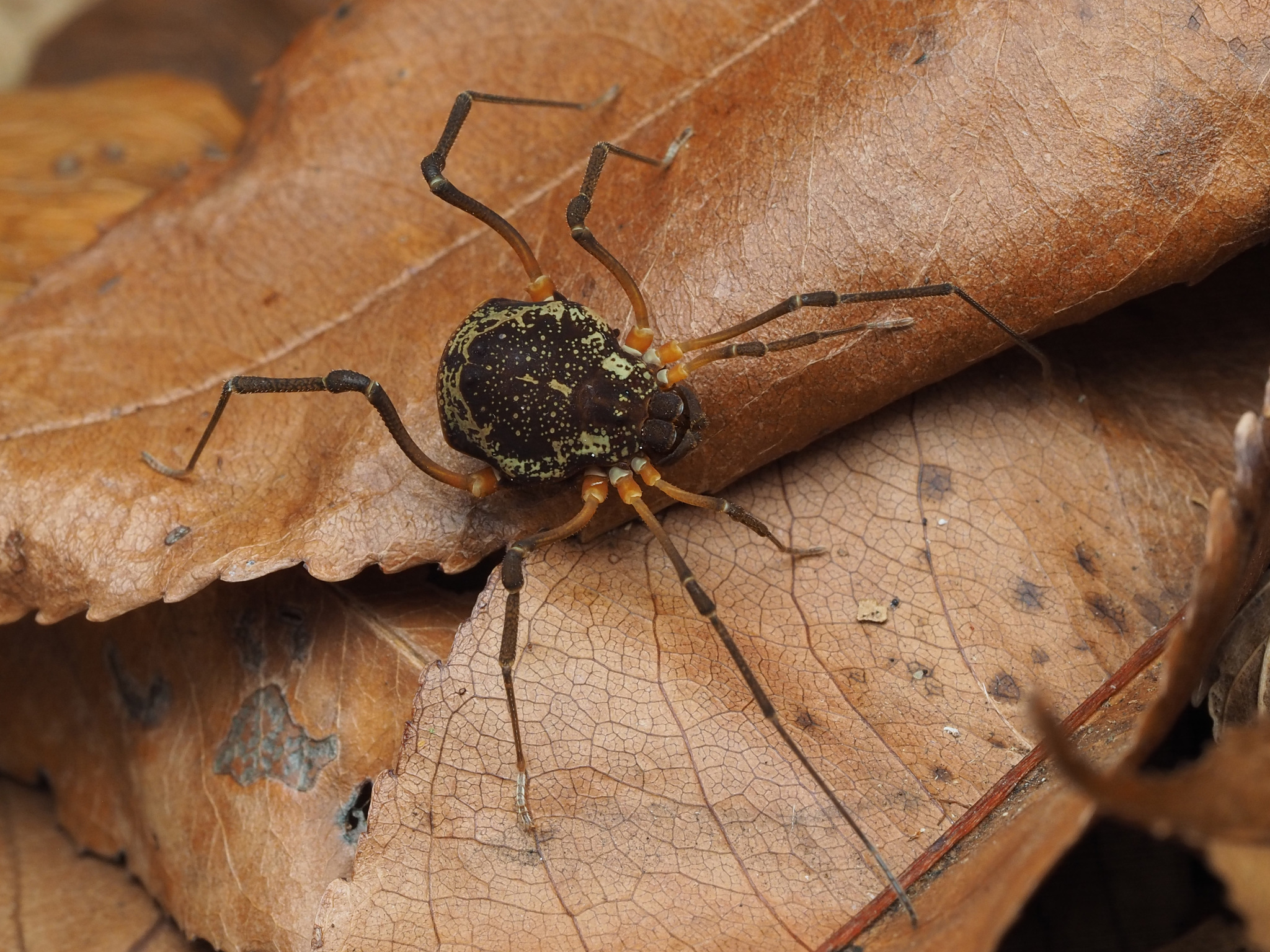
- Female Acromares vittatum in Belize

Scientific classification
- Domain: Eukaryota
- Kingdom: Animalia
- Phylum: Arthropoda
- Subphylum: Chelicerata
- Class: Arachnida
- Order: Opiliones
- Family: Cosmetidae
- Genus: Acromares
- Species: A. vittatum

Binomial name
- Acromares vittatum Goodnight & Goodnight, 1942

= Acromares vittatum =

Species of harvestman/daddy longlegs

Acromares vittatum is a species of harvestman from the genus Acromares. This species was first described by Clarence J. Goodnight and Marie Louise Goodnight in 1942.

== Description ==
Acromares vittatum is said to be similar to Acromares roeweri. It differs by its dorsal color patterns and its leg spination.

== Range ==
The species has been recorded from numerous locations in Belize and in Yaxha, Guatemala.

== Etymology ==
Vittatum is an inflection from the Latin word "vittatus", which means banded or having a fillet.
