= Rhaucoides =

Scientific classification
- Domain: Eukaryota
- Kingdom: Animalia
- Phylum: Arthropoda
- Subphylum: Chelicerata
- Class: Arachnida
- Order: Opiliones
- Superfamily: Gonyleptoidea
- Family: Cosmetidae
- Subfamily: Metergininae
- Genus: Rhaucoides; Roewer, 1912

Type species
- Rhaucoides ornatus Roewer, 1912

Diversity
- 7 spp. (see text)

Synonyms
- Erginus Simon 1879 (Junior homonym, nec Erginus Jeffreys, 1877); Pararhauculus Mello-Leitão 1939 (Junior homonym, nec Pararhauculus Roewer, 1933); Cumbalia Roewer 1963

Genus of harvestmen/daddy longlegs

Rhaucoides is a genus of harvestmen in the family Cosmetidae with eight described species (as of early 2025). All species are from South America.

== Description ==
The genus Rhaucoides was described by Roewer, 1912 with the type species Rhaucoides ornatus (Roewer, 1912).

== Species ==
These species belong to the genus Rhaucoides:

- Rhaucoides atahualpa Medrano, García & Kury, 2022 – Ecuador
- Rhaucoides devillei (Simon, 1879) – Ecuador
- Rhaucoides marmoratus Roewer, 1947 – Ecuador
- Rhaucoides nasa Medrano, García & Kury, 2022 – Colombia
- Rhaucoides ornatus Roewer, 1912 – Ecuador
- Rhaucoides riveti Roewer, 1914 – Ecuador
- Rhaucoides virescens (Mello-Leitão, 1942) – Ecuador

== Etymology ==
The genus is masculine. Genus name derives from apre-existing genus Rhaucus + interpreted masculine Latin suffix -oides.
