= Abria =

Scientific classification
- Domain: Eukaryota
- Kingdom: Animalia
- Phylum: Arthropoda
- Subphylum: Chelicerata
- Class: Arachnida
- Order: Opiliones
- Infraorder: Grassatores
- Superfamily: Gonyleptoidea
- Family: Cosmetidae
- Genus: Abria; Sørensen, 1932

Type species
- Cynorta innominata Henriksen, 1932

Diversity
- 3 spp. (see text)

Genus of harvestmen/daddy longlegs

Abria is a genus of harvestmen in the family Cosmetidae with three described species (as of early 2024). All species are from Venezuela. An overview of the taxonomy was provided by Villarreal, Medrano & Kury (2023)

== Description ==
The genus Abria was described by Sørensen, 1932, originally as a subgenus of Cynorta, with the type species Cynorta innominata (Henriksen, 1932). The revised group needs further comparison with other genera to establish their placement within the wider family Cosmetidae.

== Species ==
These species belong to the genus Abria:

- Abria innominata (Henriksen, 1932) – Venezuela
- Abria maculabnormis (González-Sponga, 1992) – Venezuela
- Abria reticulata (Roewer, 1947) – Venezuela

== Etymology ==
The genus is feminine.
