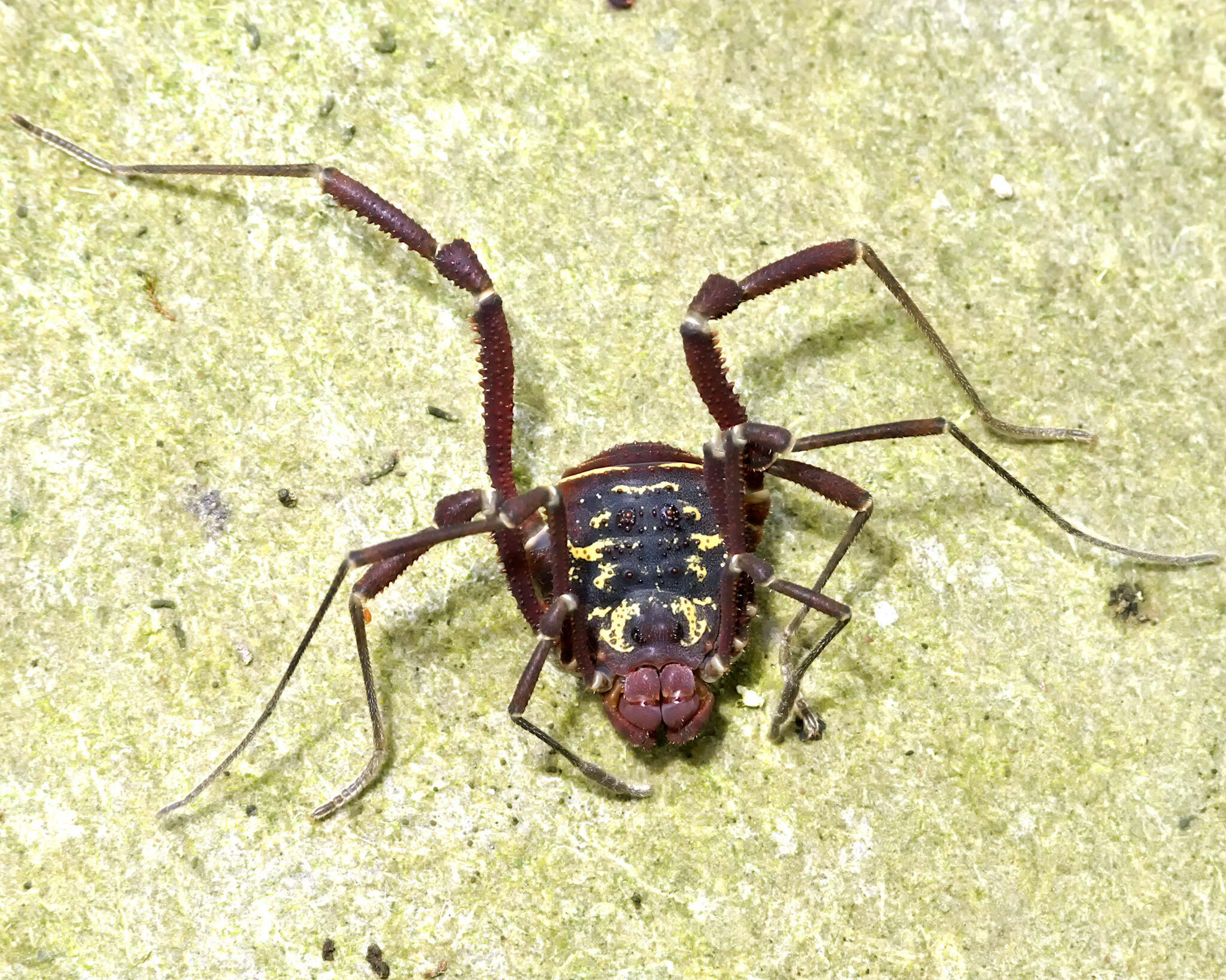
- Rhaucus serripes

Scientific classification
- Kingdom: Animalia
- Phylum: Arthropoda
- Subphylum: Chelicerata
- Class: Arachnida
- Order: Opiliones
- Family: Cosmetidae
- Subfamily: Metergininae
- Genus: Rhaucus; Simon, 1879

Type species
- Rhaucus vulneratus Simon, 1879

Species
- 11 species (see text)

Synonyms
- List: Cynorta (in part) Goodnight & Goodnight, 1953; Megarhaucus Mello-Leitão, 1941; Metarhaucus F.O. Pickard-Cambridge, 1905; Neorhaucus F.O. Pickard-Cambridge, 1905; Pararhaucus F.O. Pickard-Cambridge, 1905; Erginus Simon, 1879

= Rhaucus (harvestman) =

Genus of arachnids

Rhaucus is a genus of harvestmen in the family Cosmetidae. The genus is endemic to the northern Andes in Colombia. There are currently seven described species in the genus.

== Taxonomy ==
Many other species were included in the genus Rhaucus, until a taxonomic revision (in 2017) reduced the genus to a more clearly defined grouping and synonymized or transferred multiple previously described species to leave five remaining species. A previously synonymized species, R. papilionaceus, was revalidated in 2018.Two other species were later transferred into the genus and two new species described.

== Etymology ==
Rhaucus is likely named for an ancient Cretian town, Rhaucus.

== Species ==
Rhaucus contains the following species: (after García & Kury, 2017; García & Daniela Ahumada-C., 2018; Pinzón-Morales & Pinto-da-Rocha, 2024).

- Rhaucus artifex Pinzón-Morales & Pinto-da-Rocha, 2024
- Rhaucus florezi Garcia & Kury, 2017
- Rhaucus gaiterus Pinzón-Morales & Pinto-da-Rocha, 2024
- Rhaucus marmoratus (Roewer, 1912)
- Rhaucus papilionaceus (Simon, 1879)
- Rhaucus quinquelineatus Simon, 1879
- Rhaucus robustus (Mello-Leitão, 1941)
- Rhaucus serratus (Roewer, 1912)
- Rhaucus serripes (Simon, 1879)
- Rhaucus trilineatus (Sørensen, 1932)
- Rhaucus vulneratus Simon, 1879

(Note: Rhaucus trilineatus is interpreted as having been indirectly transferred to Rhaucus due to the synonymy of Metarhaucus F.O. Pickard-Cambridge, 1905 under Rhaucus in García & Kury (2017: 417). There, the type species Metarhaucus fuscus Pickard-Cambridge 1905 became a junior synonym of Rhaucus serripes (Simon, 1879)), consequently leading to Metarhaucus = Rhaucus. Other species then placed in Metarhaucus at that time and similarly affected by the same synonymy have since been re-formalised into other genera).
