= Trinimontius =

Scientific classification
- Domain: Eukaryota
- Kingdom: Animalia
- Phylum: Arthropoda
- Subphylum: Chelicerata
- Class: Arachnida
- Order: Opiliones
- Family: Cosmetidae
- Subfamily: Metergininae
- Genus: Trinimontius; Šilhavý, 1970
- Species: T. darlingtoni

Binomial name
- Trinimontius darlingtoni Šilhavý, 1970

Species of harvestman/daddy longlegs

Trinimontius is a monotypic genus of harvestman (a member of the order Opiliones) belonging to the family Cosmetidae. Its sole accepted species is Trinimontius darlingtoni. The only known species is from Cuba.
