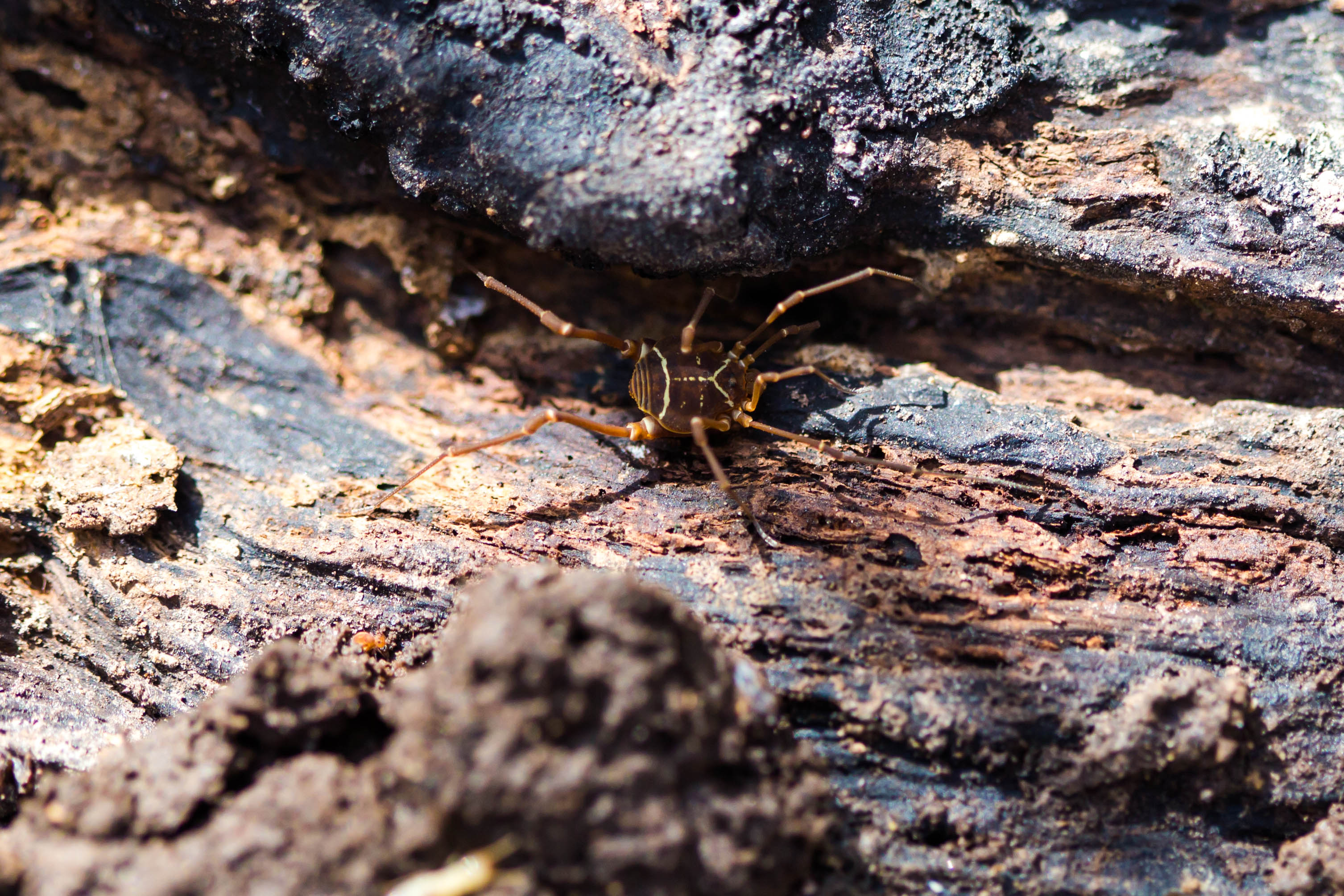

Scientific classification
- Kingdom: Animalia
- Phylum: Arthropoda
- Subphylum: Chelicerata
- Class: Arachnida
- Order: Opiliones
- Family: Cosmetidae
- Genus: Vonones
- Species: V. ornatus

Binomial name
- Vonones ornatus (Say, 1821)

= Vonones ornatus =

Species of harvestman/daddy longlegs

Vonones ornatus is a species of armoured harvestman in the family Cosmetidae. It is found in North America.
