= Discosomaticinae =

Scientific classification
- Kingdom: Animalia
- Phylum: Arthropoda
- Subphylum: Chelicerata
- Class: Arachnida
- Order: Opiliones
- Family: Cosmetidae
- Subfamily: Discosomaticinae; Roewer, 1923

Genera
- See text

Subfamily of arachnids (harvestmen/daddy longlegs)

Discosomaticinae is a subfamily of harvestmen in the family Cosmetidae.

== Description ==
The subfamily was defined within Cosmetidae

== Taxonomy ==
The subfamily includes the following genera, within two tribes:

Discosomaticini Roewer, 1923

- Marronia Simon, 1879
- Neokayania Yao & Xing, 2022
- Paraprotus Roewer, 1912
- Protus Simon, 1879
- Sibambea Roewer, 1917 (which subsequently includes the nominative genus Discosomaticus Roewer, 1923 as a synonym)

Roquetteini Medrano, Kury & Mendes, 2021

- Gryne Simon, 1879
- Roquettea Mello-Leitão, 1931
