= Flirteinae =

Scientific classification
- Kingdom: Animalia
- Phylum: Arthropoda
- Subphylum: Chelicerata
- Class: Arachnida
- Order: Opiliones
- Family: Cosmetidae
- Subfamily: Flirteinae; Medrano, Kury & Mendes, 2021

Genera
- See text

Subfamily of arachnids (harvestmen/daddy longlegs)

Flirteinae is a subfamily of harvestmen in the family Cosmetidae.

== Description ==
The subfamily was defined within Cosmetidae

== Taxonomy ==
The subfamily includes the following genera:

- Flirtea Koch, 1839
- Paecilaemana Roewer, 1928
- Paecilaemella Roewer, 1925
