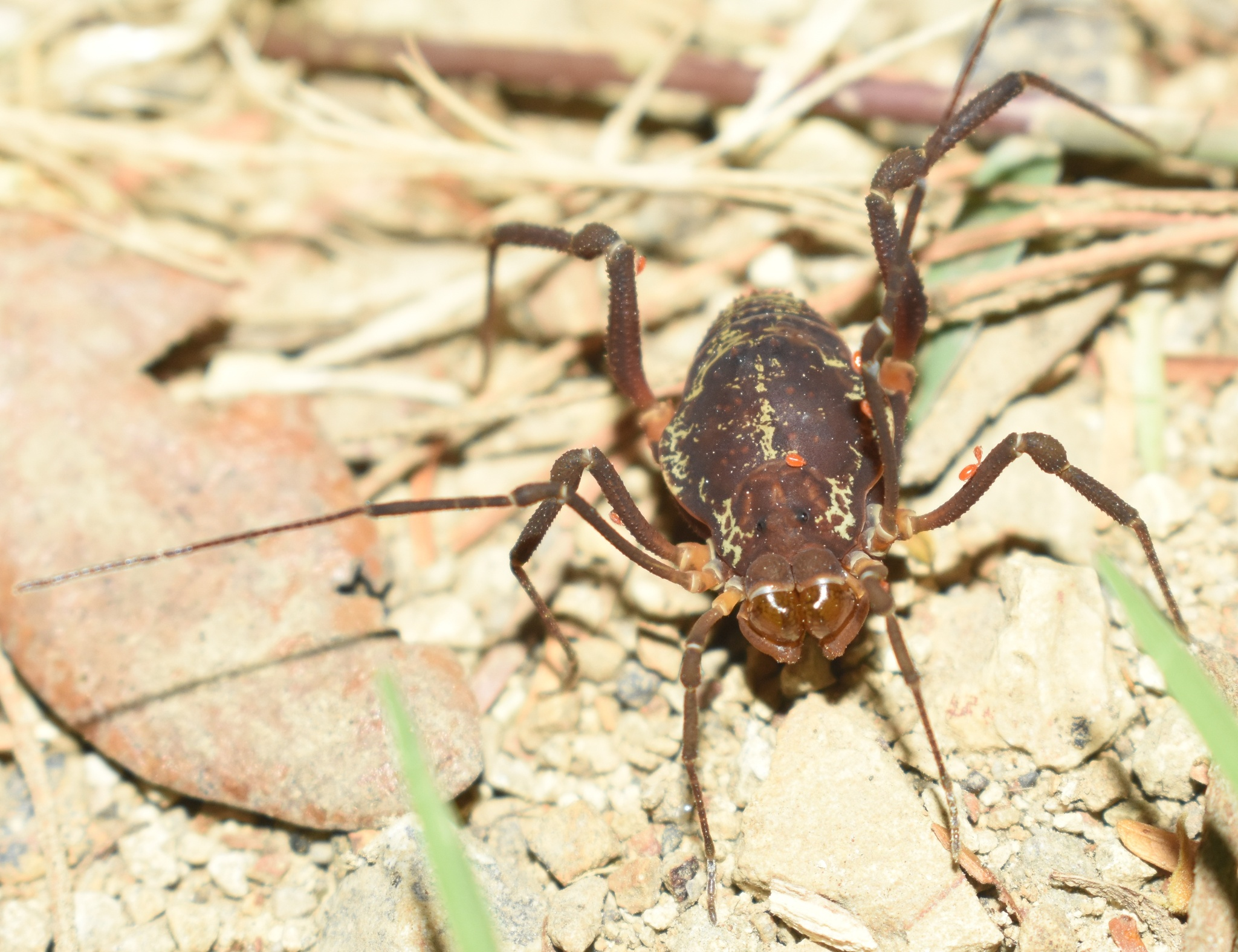
- Erginulus subserialis

Scientific classification
- Domain: Eukaryota
- Kingdom: Animalia
- Phylum: Arthropoda
- Subphylum: Chelicerata
- Class: Arachnida
- Order: Opiliones
- Family: Cosmetidae
- Subfamily: Metergininae
- Genus: Erginulus; Roewer, 1912

Type species
- Erginus serratipes Roewer, 1912

Diversity
- 29 spp. (see text)

Synonyms
- List: Euerginus Roewer, 1912; Acromares Goodnight & Goodnight, 1942; Bivonones Goodnight & Goodnight, 1942

= Erginulus =

Genus of harvestmen/daddy longlegs

Erginulus is a genus of harvestmen in the family Cosmetidae with twenty-nine described species (as of early 2025). The species are from eastern Mexico & Northern Central America, although a few have been described from outlying geographic regions.

== Description ==
The genus Erginulus was described by Roewer, 1912 with the type species Erginus serratipes Roewer, 1912. The genus was later included in the subfamily Metergininae.

== Species ==
These species belong to the genus Erginulus:

- Erginulus arcuatus (Pickard-Cambridge, 1905) – Guatemala
- Erginulus australis (Roewer, 1916) – Colombia
- Erginulus bimaculatus Goodnight & Goodnight, 1977 – Mexico (Campeche)
- Erginulus biserratus Roewer, 1947 – Guatemala
- Erginulus brevispinosus Goodnight & Goodnight, 1947 – Honduras
- Erginulus castaneus (Banks, 1906) – Bahamas
- Erginulus centralis (Sørensen, 1932) – Mexico (Durango, later allegedly Tamaulipas)
- Erginulus clavipes (Pickard-Cambridge, 1905) – Guatemala, Mexico
- Erginulus clavotibialis (Pickard-Cambridge, 1905) – Mexico (Yucatán, etc), Guatemala, Belize
- Erginulus crassescens (Pickard-Cambridge, 1905) – Guatemala
- Erginulus cristatus (Pickard-Cambridge, 1905) – Guatemala
- Erginulus erectispinus (Pickard-Cambridge, 1905) – Guatemala
- Erginulus figuratus (Roewer, 1947) – Costa Rica
- Erginulus gervaisii (Sørensen, 1932) – Mexico (Yucatán)
- Erginulus leviarcuatus (Sørensen, 1932) – Mexico (Veracruz)
- Erginulus pectiginerus (Pickard-Cambridge, 1905) – Guatemala, Honduras
- Erginulus pulcher Goodnight & Goodnight, 1942 – Mexico (Veracruz)
- Erginulus quadricristatus (Franganillo Balboa, 1926) – Cuba
- Erginulus rectus (Pickard-Cambridge, 1905) – Guatemala
- Erginulus roeweri (Goodnight & Goodnight, 1947) – Mexico (Yucatán)
- Erginulus serratifer (Pickard-Cambridge, 1905) – Guatemala
- Erginulus serratipes (Pickard-Cambridge, 1905) – Guatemala
- Erginulus serratofemoralis Goodnight & Goodnight, 1947 – Belize
- Erginulus simplicipes (Pickard-Cambridge, 1905) – Guatemala
- Erginulus singularis Goodnight & Goodnight, 1977 – Belize
- Erginulus sinuosus (Pickard-Cambridge, 1905) – Guatemala
- Erginulus subserialis (Pickard-Cambridge, 1905) – Mexico (Chiapas), Guatemala, El Salvador, Costa Rica
- Erginulus triangularis (Pickard-Cambridge, 1905) – Guatemala
- Erginulus weyerensis Goodnight & Goodnight, 1977 – Belize

== Etymology ==
The genus is masculine.
