= Corosalia =

Scientific classification
- Domain: Eukaryota
- Kingdom: Animalia
- Phylum: Arthropoda
- Subphylum: Chelicerata
- Class: Arachnida
- Order: Opiliones
- Family: Cosmetidae
- Genus: Corosalia; González-Sponga, 1998
- Species: C. tigrina

Binomial name
- Corosalia tigrina González-Sponga, 1998

Species of harvestman/daddy longlegs

Corosalia is a monotypic genus of harvestman (a member of the order Opiliones) belonging to the family Cosmetidae. Its sole accepted species is Corosalia tigrina.

== Species ==
These species belong to the genus Corosalia:

- Corosalia tigrina González-Sponga, 1998 – Venezuela
