= Rhauculanus =

Scientific classification
- Domain: Eukaryota
- Kingdom: Animalia
- Phylum: Arthropoda
- Subphylum: Chelicerata
- Class: Arachnida
- Order: Opiliones
- Family: Cosmetidae
- Subfamily: Metergininae
- Genus: Rhauculanus; Roewer, 1928
- Species: R. lineolatus

Binomial name
- Rhauculanus lineolatus Roewer, 1928

Species of harvestman/daddy longlegs

Rhauculanus is a monotypic genus of harvestman (a member of the order Opiliones) belonging to the family Cosmetidae. Its sole accepted species is Rhauculanus lineolatus. The only known species is from South America, specifically Ecuador.

== Species ==
These species belong to the genus Rhauculanus:

- Rhauculanus lineolatus Roewer, 1928 – Ecuador
