= Meterginus =

Scientific classification
- Domain: Eukaryota
- Kingdom: Animalia
- Phylum: Arthropoda
- Subphylum: Chelicerata
- Class: Arachnida
- Order: Opiliones
- Superfamily: Gonyleptoidea
- Family: Cosmetidae
- Subfamily: Metergininae
- Genus: Meterginus; Pickard-Cambridge, 1905

Type species
- Meterginus basalis Pickard-Cambridge, 1905

Diversity
- 15 spp. (see text)

Synonyms
- None

Genus of harvestmen/daddy longlegs

Meterginus is a genus of harvestmen in the family Cosmetidae with fifteen described species (as of early 2025). The species are from eastern Mexico & Central America, although a few have been described from outlying geographic regions.

== Description ==
The genus Meterginus was described by F.O. Pickard-Cambridge, 1905 with the type species Meterginus basalis Pickard-Cambridge, 1905. The genus was later included in the subfamily Metergininae.

== Species ==
These species belong to the genus Meterginus:

- Meterginus affinis Roewer, 1963 – Colombia
- Meterginus albonotatus (Goodnight & Goodnight, 1953) – Mexico (Chiapas)
- Meterginus apicalis (Pickard-Cambridge, 1905) – Guatemala
- Meterginus basalis (Pickard-Cambridge, 1905) – Guatemala, later Mexico
- Meterginus dorsalis (Pickard-Cambridge, 1905) – Guatemala
- Meterginus flavicinctus (Gervais, 1842) – Colombia
- Meterginus inermipes Roewer, 1947 – Costa Rica
- Meterginus latesulfureus (Simon, 1879) – Brazil
- Meterginus marginellus (Simon, 1879) – Colombia
- Meterginus obscurus (Sørensen, 1932) – Colombia
- Meterginus prosopis Roewer, 1912 – Ecuador
- Meterginus simonis (With, 1932) – Colombia
- Meterginus tibialis (Pickard-Cambridge, 1905) – Guatemala
- Meterginus togatus (Sørensen, 1932) – Colombia
- Meterginus zilchi Roewer, 1954 – El Salvador

Else, for former Meterginus marmoratus (Roewer, 1912), see Rhaucus marmoratus (Roewer, 1912) For former Meterginus serratus Roewer, 1912 see Rhaucus serratus (Roewer, 1912)

== Etymology ==
The genus is masculine.
