= Neokayania =

Scientific classification
- Kingdom: Animalia
- Phylum: Arthropoda
- Subphylum: Chelicerata
- Class: Arachnida
- Order: Opiliones
- Family: Cosmetidae
- Subfamily: Discosomaticinae
- Tribe: Discosomaticini
- Genus: Neokayania; Yao & Xing, 2022

Species
- Neokayania bicolumnata; Neokayania compressicoxa

Synonyms
- Kayania

Genus of harvestmen

Neokayania is a scarce genus of harvestmen from Ecuador and Peru with 2 recognized species.
