= Gorgolainis =

Gorgolainis Γοργολαΐνης
- Municipal unit
- Location within the regional unit

- Location within Greece
- Coordinates: 35°12′N 25°01′E
- Country: Greece
- Administrative region: Crete
- Regional unit: Heraklion
- Municipality: Heraklion

Area
  - Municipal unit: 41.5 km^{2} (16.0 sq mi)

Population (2021)
  - Municipal unit: 2,525
  - Municipal unit density: 60.8/km^{2} (158/sq mi)
- Time zone: UTC+2 (EET)
  - Summer (DST): UTC+3 (EEST)

Gorgolainis (Greek: Γοργολαΐνης) is a former municipality in the Heraklion regional unit, Crete, Greece. Since the 2011 local government reform it is part of the municipality Heraklion, of which it is a municipal unit. The municipal unit has an area of 41.458 km^{2}. Population 2,525 (2021). The seat of the municipality was in Agios Myronas. Another village within the municipal unit is Kato Asites.
