= Kato Asites =

Kato Asites Kάτω Ασίτες
- Community
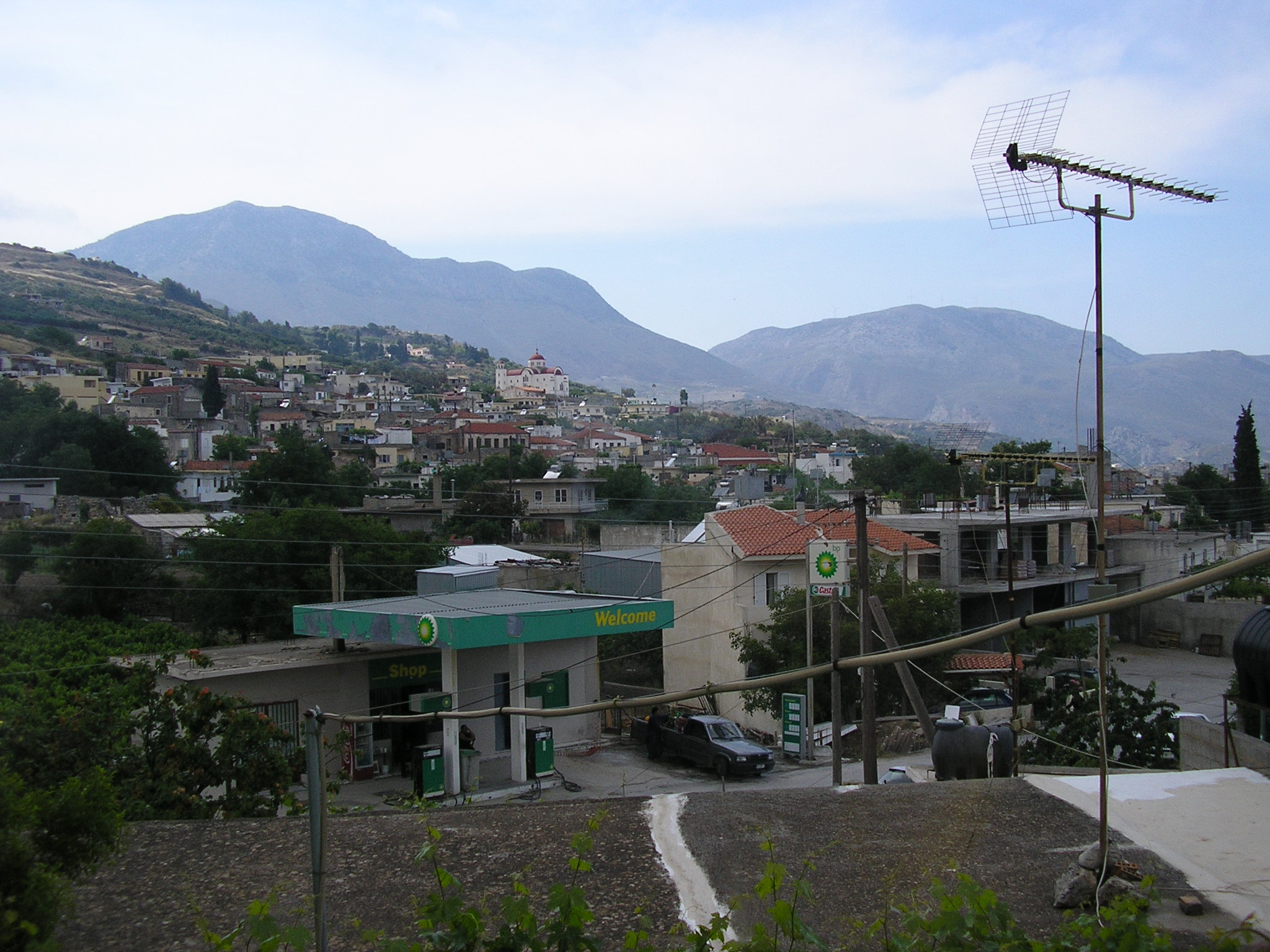

- Location within Greece
- Coordinates: 35°12′N 25°0′E
- Country: Greece
- Administrative region: Crete
- Regional unit: Heraklion
- Municipality: Heraklion
- Municipal unit: Gorgolainis

Population (2021)
  - Community: 1,040
- Time zone: UTC+2 (EET)
  - Summer (DST): UTC+3 (EEST)

Kato Asites (Greek: Kάτω Ασίτες) is a medium-sized village in the heart of the Heraklion regional unit, Crete. It is part of the Gorgolainis municipal unit. It has a population of around 1,100 inhabitants. It is situated 24 km southwest of Heraklion City. The village enjoys very hot and dry summers, with mild rainy winters and occasionally snow.

== Places of interest ==
One kilometer north of Kato Asites is situated the Gorgolaini Monastery. The village has nine churches, with Agia Pariskevi being the most famous one. The story behind the church is legendary in the village. While being under Turkish domination between 15th and 19th centuries, a Turk tried to sabotage a Cretan wedding. He went to the wedding and tried to shoot the bride. Unfortunately for him, the bullet ricocheted off the church wall and into his stomach, killing him.
