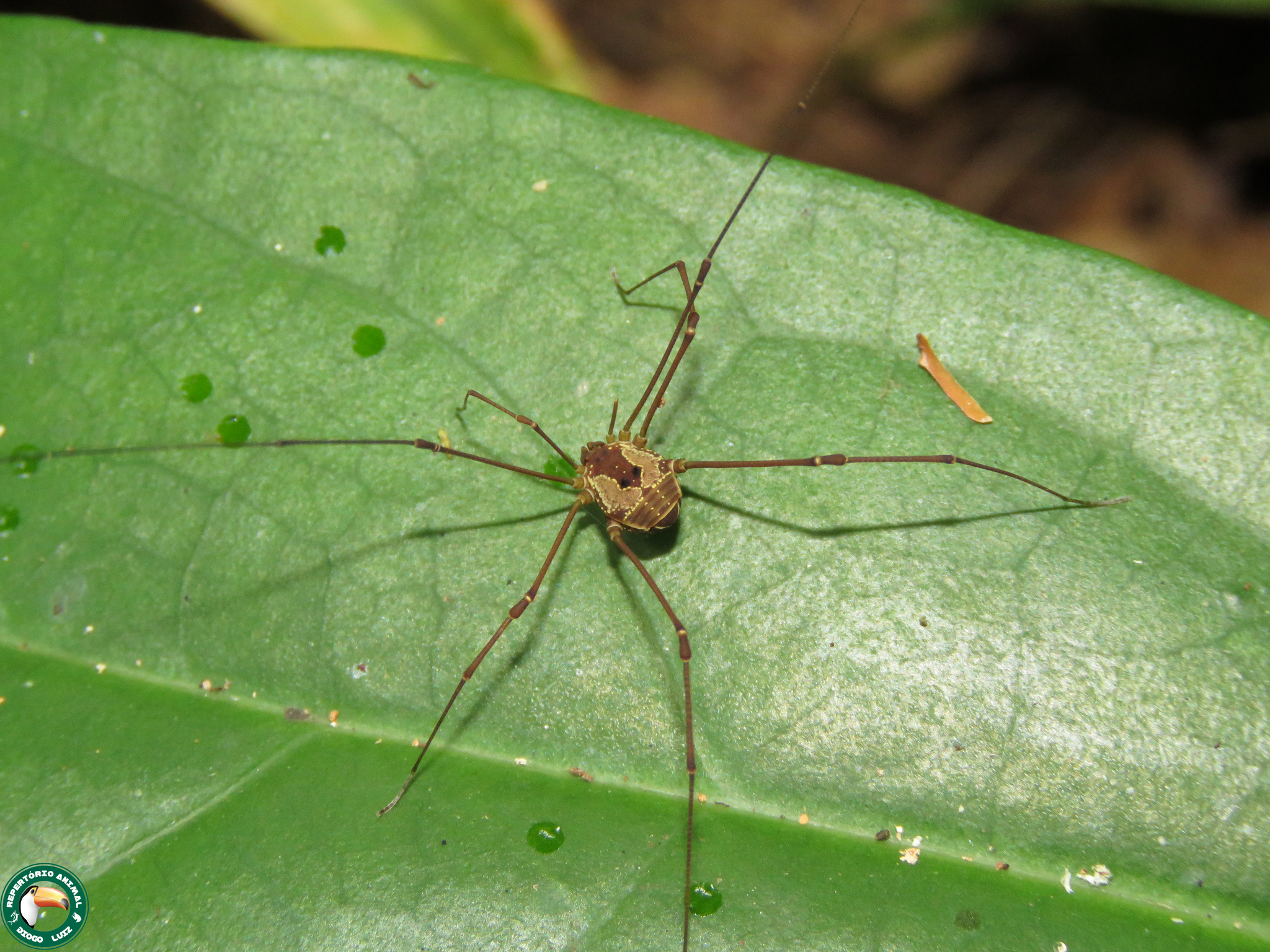
- Paecilaema u-flavum

Scientific classification
- Domain: Eukaryota
- Kingdom: Animalia
- Phylum: Arthropoda
- Subphylum: Chelicerata
- Class: Arachnida
- Order: Opiliones
- Family: Cosmetidae
- Subfamily: Cosmetinae
- Genus: Paecilaema; Koch, 1839

= Paecilaema =

Genus of arachnids

Paecilaema is a genus of harvestmen in the family Cosmetidae. It was first described by Carl Ludwig Koch in 1839.
