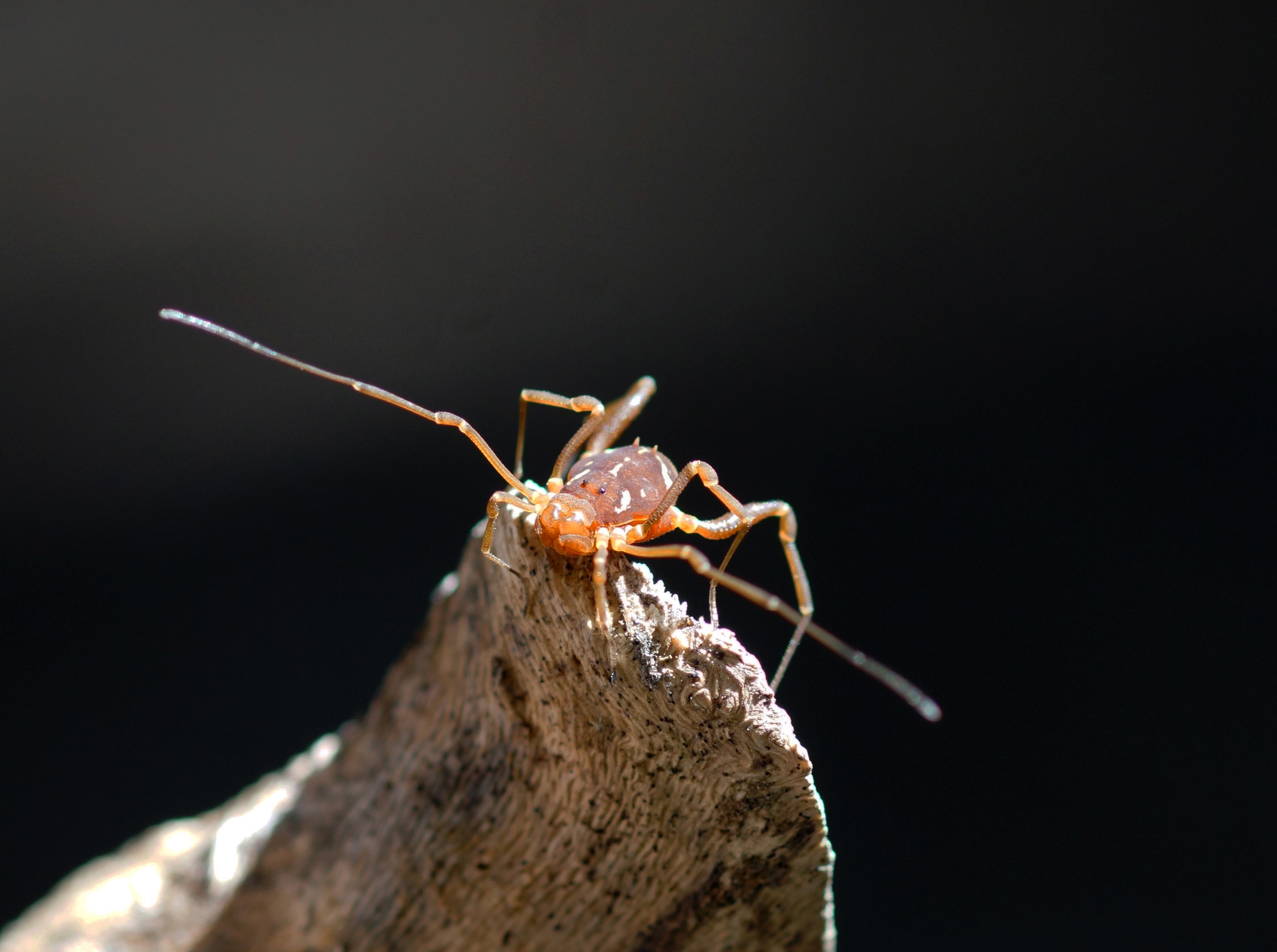

Scientific classification
- Kingdom: Animalia
- Phylum: Arthropoda
- Subphylum: Chelicerata
- Class: Arachnida
- Order: Opiliones
- Family: Cosmetidae
- Subfamily: Cosmetinae
- Genus: Cynorta; Koch, 1839

= Cynorta =

Genus of arachnids

Cynorta is a genus of harvestmen in the subfamily Cynortinae. The genus was erected by Carl Ludwig Koch.

== Taxonomy ==
The type species of Cynorta is Cynorta conspersa.

== Range ==
The initial description of the genus was based on occurrences in Brazil, Costa Rica, Cuba, Ecuador, French Guiana, and Suriname. Overall, the genus is poorly defined, and currently includes multiple species from different regions without support for shared ancestry.
