= Libitiinae =

Scientific classification
- Kingdom: Animalia
- Phylum: Arthropoda
- Subphylum: Chelicerata
- Class: Arachnida
- Order: Opiliones
- Family: Cosmetidae
- Subfamily: Libitiinae; Medrano, Kury & Mendes, 2021

Genera
- See text

Subfamily of arachnids (harvestmen/daddy longlegs)

Libitiinae is a subfamily of harvestmen in the family Cosmetidae.

== Description ==
The subfamily was defined within Cosmetidae

== Taxonomy ==
The subfamily includes the following genera:

- Ambatoiella Mello-Leitão, 1943
- Libitia Simon, 1879
- Oligovonones di Caporiacco, 1951
