= Vladimír Šilhavý =

Vladimír Šilhavý (20 July 1913 – 6 July 1984) was a Czech zoologist and physician. He studied the opiliones fauna of the region intensively while also taking an interest in a number of insect groups. He was also an artist who illustrated most of his taxonomic works on his own. He described eight new genera and 20 new species of opiliones although several have since been sunk into synonymy.

== Life and work ==
Šilhavý was born in Kutná Hora where his father Eduard was a teacher, amateur archaeologist and folklorist. His father was posted in Budíkovice (today part of Třebíč) and he grew up in the Třebíč region studying at the local elementary school. An interest in natural history was encouraged by his uncle Vilém Vlach who was a lepidopterist. While studying at the Třebíč gymnasium (graduated 1932), he was influenced by biologist and ecologist Alois Dichtl; and entomologist Antonín Růžička. Růžička was the founder of the Natural Science Club in Třebíč. Early in life Šilhavý studied the ants of the Třebíč area. In 1933 he wrote his first research paper on harvestmen. In 1937 he described a new parasitic ant species Strongylognathus kratochvili from Mohelno. After high school he went to study medicine in Brno and the family moved to Podklášteří (today part of Třebíč). World War II interrupted his studies and completed it only in 1945. He married Olga Veleba in 1943. He worked during this period as a medical assistant. He then worked at the Třebíč hospital for two years before becoming a district physician in Stařeč. He travelled widely and collected in North Africa, Soviet Union, North Korea, India, Ceylon and Cuba. In 1956 he produced a work on the opiliones of the Czech region as part of the Fauna ČSR series. In 1960 he produced a major work on the world systematics of the opiliones Die Grundsätze der modernen Weberknechttaxonomie und Revision des bisherigen Systems der Opilioniden which was presented at the 11th International Entomological Congress in Vienna. He also wrote a number of popular articles on the Bohemian-Moravian Highlands and their fauna, promoting conservation of the region.

A number of species have been named in his honour including:

- Hummelinckiolus silhavyi Cokendolpher & Poinar, 1998
- Pashokia silhavyi Martens, 1977
- Opilio silhavyi Kratochvíl, 1936
- Siro silhavyi Kratochvíl, 1937
- Stylocellus silhavyi Rambla, 1991
- Manahunca silhavyi Avram, 1977, now a synonym of Phalangium chrysomelas Hermann, 1804
