= Giophyros River =

River in Crete

Coordinates: 35°20′28″N 25°06′52″E

The Giophyros or Platyperama is a river near Iraklion, Crete. Its ancient name was the Triton.
