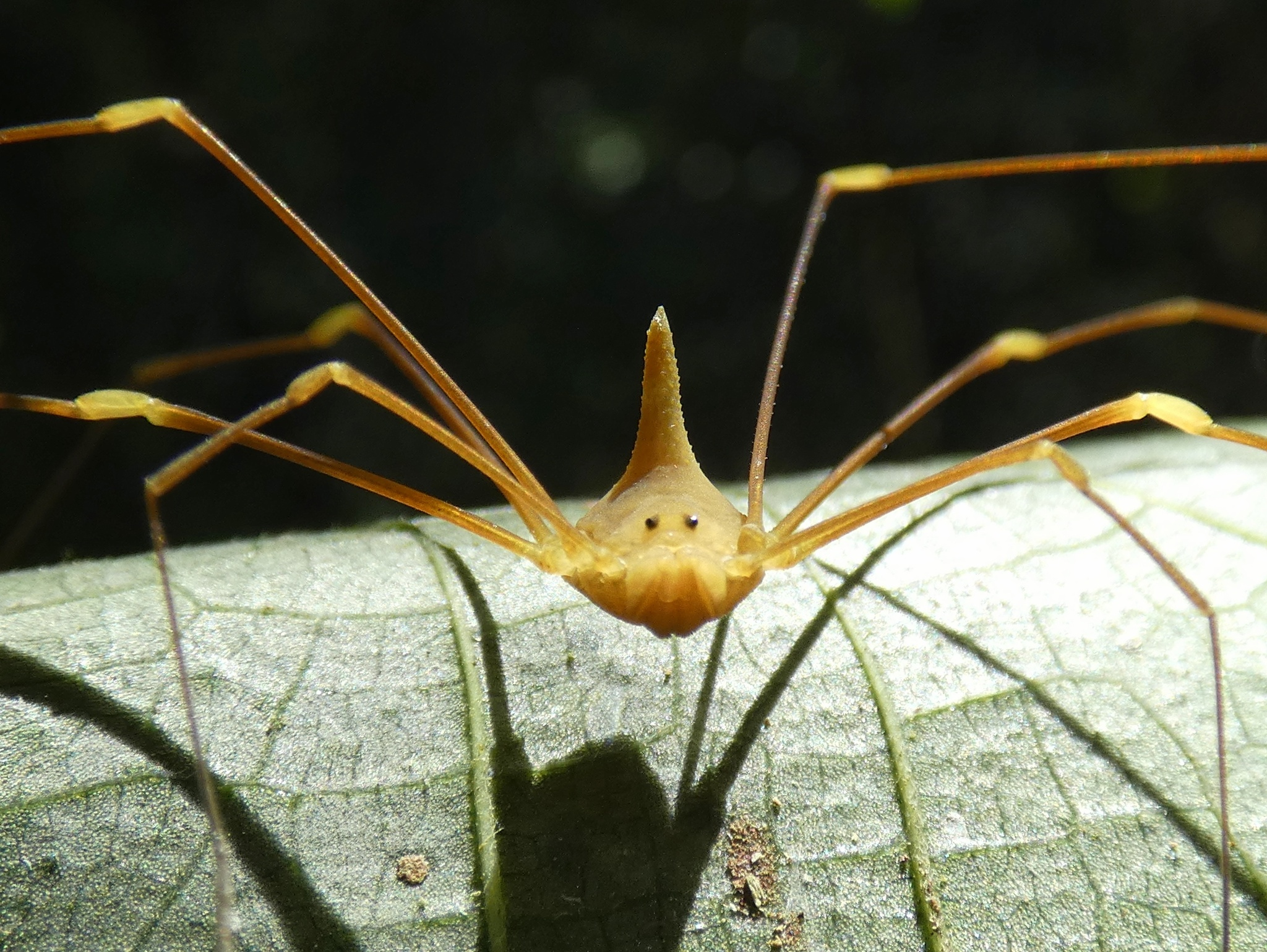
- Cosmetus balboa

Scientific classification
- Kingdom: Animalia
- Phylum: Arthropoda
- Subphylum: Chelicerata
- Class: Arachnida
- Order: Opiliones
- Family: Cosmetidae
- Subfamily: Cosmetinae; Koch, 1839

Genera
- See text

= Cosmetinae =

Subfamily of arachnids (harvestmen/daddy longlegs)

Cosmetinae is a subfamily of harvestmen in the family Cosmetidae.

== Description ==
The subfamily was defined within Cosmetidae

== Taxonomy ==
Cosmetinae contains just three genera since major revision in 2021, massively reduced from the over 115 genera during earlier formulations of previous authors. However many genera of the family Cosmetidae have not yet been replaced into revised subfamilies and hence the delimitation of Cosmetinae could again expand, but as of revision now contains:

- Cosmetus Perty, 1833
- Metavononoides Roewer, 1912
- Paecilaema Koch, 1839
