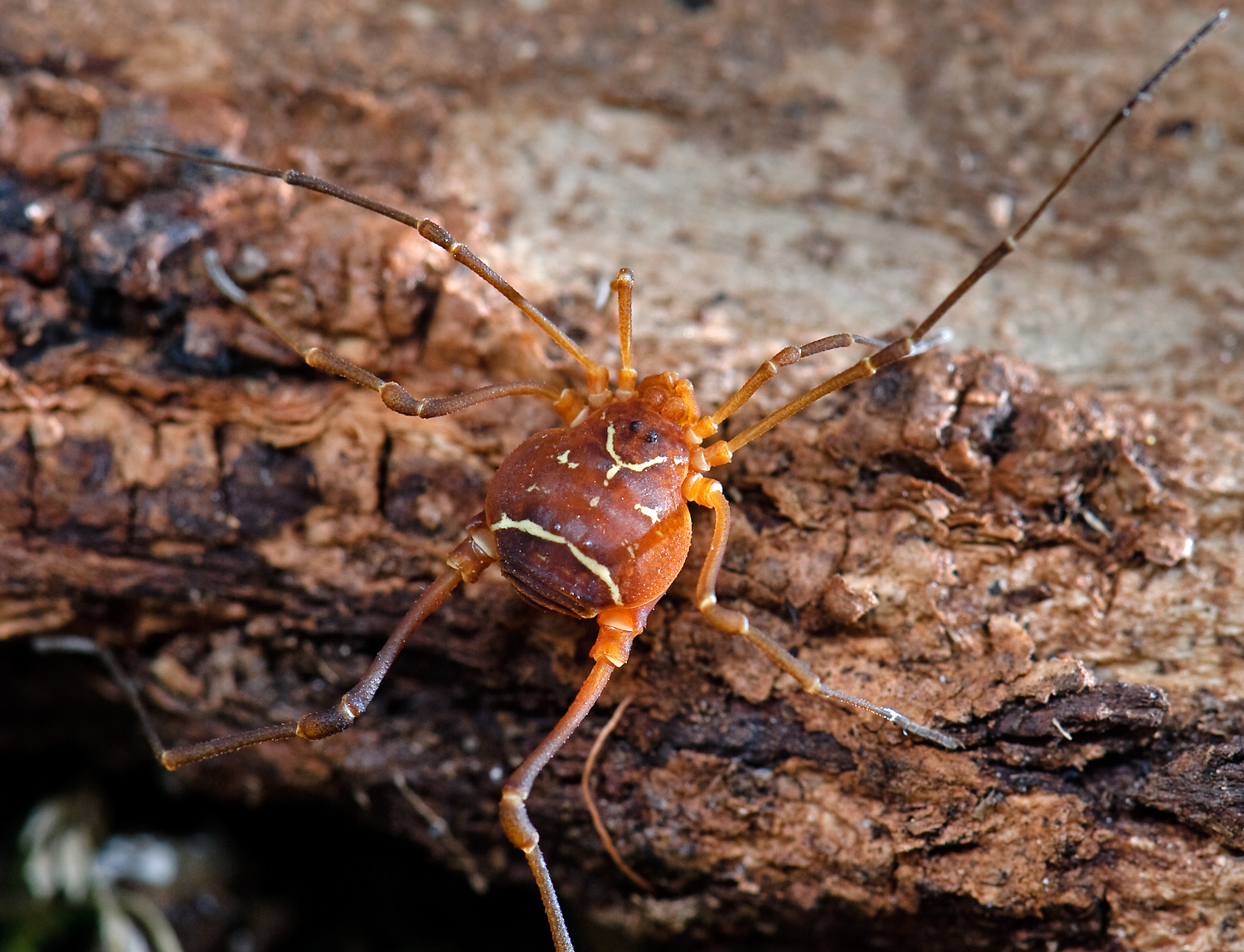
- Vonones sayi

Scientific classification
- Kingdom: Animalia
- Phylum: Arthropoda
- Subphylum: Chelicerata
- Class: Arachnida
- Order: Opiliones
- Family: Cosmetidae
- Genus: Vonones; Simon, 1879

= Vonones (harvestman) =

Genus of harvestmen/daddy longlegs

Vonones is a genus of armoured harvestmen in the family Cosmetidae. There are at least two described species in Vonones.

== Species ==
These two species belong to the genus Vonones:

- Vonones ornatus (Say, 1821)^{i c g b}
- Vonones sayi (Simon, 1879)^{i c g b}

Data sources: i = ITIS, c = Catalogue of Life, g = GBIF, b = Bugguide.net
