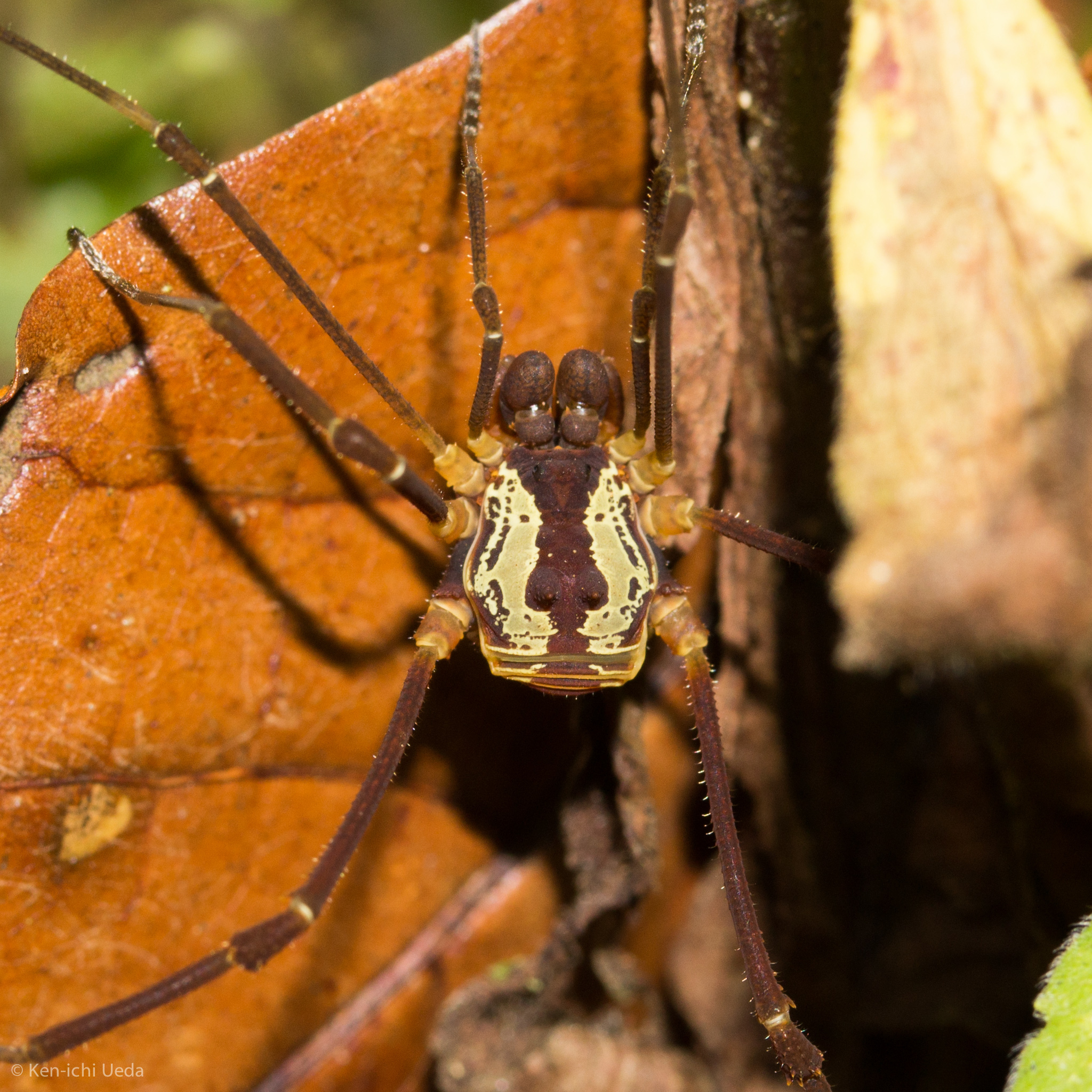
- Meterginus togatus

Scientific classification
- Kingdom: Animalia
- Phylum: Arthropoda
- Subphylum: Chelicerata
- Class: Arachnida
- Order: Opiliones
- Family: Cosmetidae
- Subfamily: Metergininae; Medrano, Kury & Mendes, 2021

Genera
- See text

= Metergininae =

Subfamily of arachnids (harvestmen/daddy longlegs)

Metergininae is a subfamily of harvestmen in the family Cosmetidae.

== Taxonomy ==
The subfamily Metergininae includes the following genera:

- Arucillus Šilhavý, 1971
- Erginulus Roewer, 1912
- Meterginus F.O. Pickard-Cambridge, 1905
- Poecilaemula Roewer, 1912
- Rhaucoides Roewer, 1912
- Rhauculanus Roewer, 1928
- Rhauculus Roewer, 1928
- Rhaucus Simon, 1879
- Trinimontius Šilhavý, 1970
