= Rhaucus =

Town of ancient Crete

Coordinates: 35°13′43″N 25°01′48″E

Rhaucus or Rhaukos (Ancient Greek: Ῥαῦκος) was a town of ancient Crete. From the story told about the Cretan bees by Antenor in his Cretica it seems that there were two cities of this name in Crete. The existence of two places so called in the island might give rise to some such legend as that which he mentions.

The site of one Rhaucus is at or near modern Agios Myronas, between Knossos and Gortyna, and from its proximity to Mount Ida, we can infer that it is the more ancient.
