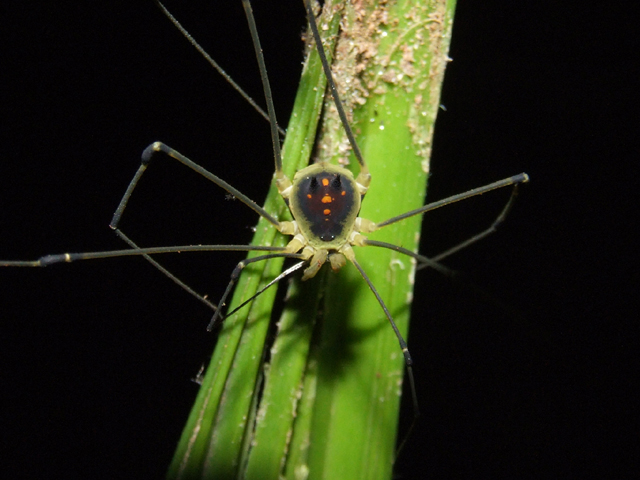
- Poecilaemula smaragdula Mello-Leitão, 1941, from Brazil.

Scientific classification
- Kingdom: Animalia
- Phylum: Arthropoda
- Subphylum: Chelicerata
- Class: Arachnida
- Order: Opiliones
- Suborder: Laniatores
- Infraorder: Grassatores
- Superfamily: Gonyleptoidea
- Family: Cosmetidae; C.L. Koch, 1839

Subfamilies
- Cosmetinae; Cynortinae; Discosomaticinae; Ferkeriinae; Flirteinae; Libitiinae; Metergininae; Taitoinae

= Cosmetidae =

Family of harvestmen/daddy longlegs

Cosmetidae is a family of harvestmen in the suborder Laniatores. With over 700 species, it is one of the largest families in Opiliones. They are endemic of the New World with a Nearctic-Neotropical distribution where a large fraction of the diversity of Opiliones are represented by this single family. Cosmetidae have the northern extent of their range into the USA, where a small number species occur in the southern states. However, the family is especially diverse in Mexico, Central America and northern South America; especially the Andean realms. Their range also extends further south into Argentina and southern Brazil, but they are absent in Chile. Cosmetidae are prevalent in Amazonian region, but only relatively few also occur in Brazilian Atlantic Forest. Several species are also found in the Caribbean.

== Description ==
This family comprises members that may have elaborate white or yellow (but rarely also green/orange/red) markings such as stripes and spots on the dorsal body and peculiar pedipalps strongly compressed and applied on the chelicerae. Some aspects of diagnosis are as follows

- Eye mound is very low, saddle shaped, placed on middle of cephalothorax, each ocular globe bears a crest of small pointed tubercles or is smooth. Ozopores slit-like, one opening partially covered by tubercle of coxa II. Scutal areas are often indistinct; sometimes the sulci can be distinguished by color pattern or absence of tubercles; scutum and tergites are typically weakly armed.
- Genitalia. Penis are standard gonyleptoid and very conservative, with rectangular ventral plate, puffed sac-glans, well-developed thumb-like dorsal process.

See more details in Kury & Pinto-da-Rocha (2007).

== Etymology ==
The family name is derived from the type genus Cosmetus, which is from the Greek kosmetós 'ornate'.

== Taxonomy ==
As of 2006, there are 125 genera and 712 species described. Most species belong to Cynorta (153 spp), Paecilaema (102 spp), Flirtea and Erginulus (30 spp each). However, there is no reason to believe most of genera of cosmetids are natural groups, except for a few like Metavononoides, Cosmetus (Kury, 2003) and Roquettea (Ferreira & Kury 2010). Attempts to organize the family in supra-specific units are hindered by the poorly resolved basic taxonomy.

The family was divided into two subfamilies for many years as: Cosmetinae and Discosomaticinae.

== Relationships ==
Cosmetidae is the sister-group of Gonyleptidae and both are closely related to the Stygnidae and Cranaidae (Kury, 1992).

The family was subsequently divided into seven subfamilies as:

Cosmetinae Koch, 1839
Cynortinae Mello-Leitão, 1933
Discosomaticinae Roewer, 1923
Ferkeriinae Medrano, Kury & Mendes, 2021
Flirteinae Medrano, Kury & Mendes, 2021
Libitiinae Medrano, Kury & Mendes, 2021
Metergininae Medrano, Kury & Mendes, 2021
Taitoinae Medrano, Kury & Mendes, 2021

Below is a scheme of genera now placed into revised subfamilies. Many currently recognised genera remain unplaced in subfamilies.

Cosmetid genera by different authors (many genera absent)
| Genus (see below) | Roewer | Goodnight & Goodnight | Medrano, Kury & Mendes |
|---|---|---|---|
| Cosmetus Perty, 1833 | Cosmetinae | Cosmetinae: (?) "Paecil." | Cosmetinae |
| Metavononoides Roewer, 1912 | Cosmetinae | Cosmetinae: "Cyno." | Cosmetinae |
| Paecilaema Koch, 1839 | Cosmetinae | Cosmetinae: "Paecil." | Cosmetinae |
| Abria Sørensen, 1932 | Cosmetinae | - | Cynortinae (?) |
| Cynorta Koch, 1839 | Cosmetinae | Cosmetinae: "Cyno." | Cynortinae |
| Cynortoides Roewer, 1912 | Cosmetinae | Cosmetinae: "Cyno." | Cynortinae |
| Eucynorta Roewer, 1912 | Cosmetinae | Cosmetinae: "Cyno." | Cynortinae |
| Holovonones Roewer, 1912 | Cosmetinae | Cosmetinae: "Vono." | Cynortinae |
| Metagryne Roewer, 1912 | Discosomaticinae | Discosomaticinae | Cynortinae |
| Vonones Simon, 1879 | Cosmetinae | Cosmetinae: "Vono." | Cynortinae |
| Gryne Simon, 1879 | Discosomaticinae | Discosomaticinae | Discosomaticinae |
| Marronia Simon, 1879 | Discosomaticinae | Discosomaticinae | Discosomaticinae |
| Neokayania Yao & Xing, 2022 | - | - | Discosomaticinae |
| Paraprotus Roewer, 1912 | Discosomaticinae | Discosomaticinae | Discosomaticinae |
| Protus Simon, 1879 | Discosomaticinae | Discosomaticinae | Discosomaticinae |
| Roquettea Mello-Leitão, 1931 | Discosomaticinae | Discosomaticinae | Discosomaticinae |
| Sibambea Roewer, 1917 | Discosomaticinae | Discosomaticinae | Discosomaticinae |
| Ferkeria Roewer, 1947 | Cosmetinae | ? | Ferkeriinae |
| Metalibitia Roewer, 1912 | Cosmetinae | ? | Ferkeriinae |
| Platygyndes Roewer, 1943 | Cosmetinae | ? | Ferkeriinae |
| Flirtea Koch, 1839 | Cosmetinae | Cosmetinae: "Cyno." | Flirteinae |
| Paecilaemana Roewer, 1928 | Cosmetinae | ? | Flirteinae |
| Paecilaemella Roewer, 1925| | Cosmetinae | Cosmetinae: "Paecil." | Flirteinae |
| Ambatoiella Mello-Leitão, 1943 | Cosmetinae | Cosmetinae: "Vono." | Libitiinae |
| Libitia Simon, 1879 | Cosmetinae | Cosmetinae: "Vono." | Libitiinae |
| Oligovonones di Caporiacco, 1951 | - | - | Libitiinae |
| Arucillus Šilhavý, 1971 | - | - | Metergininae |
| Erginulus Roewer, 1912 | Cosmetinae | Cosmetinae: "Cyno." | Metergininae |
| Meterginus F.O. Pickard-Cambridge, 1905 | Cosmetinae | Cosmetinae: "Paecil." | Metergininae |
| Poecilaemula Roewer, 1912 | Cosmetinae | Cosmetinae: "Paecil." | Metergininae |
| Rhaucoides Roewer, 1912 | Cosmetinae | ? | Metergininae |
| Rhauculanus Roewer, 1928 | Cosmetinae | ? | Metergininae |
| Rhauculus Roewer, 1928 | Cosmetinae | ? | Metergininae |
| Rhaucus Simon, 1879 | Cosmetinae | Cosmetinae: "Cyno." | Metergininae |
| Trinimontius Šilhavý, 1970 | - | - | Metergininae |
| Acritas Sørensen, 1932 | - | - | Taitoinae |
| Chinchipea Roewer, 1952 | - | - | Taitoinae |
| Chirinosbius Roewer, 1952 | - | - | Taitoinae |
| Chusgonobius Roewer, 1952 | - | - | Taitoinae |
| Cynortoplus Roewer, 1925 | - | - | Taitoinae |
| Cynortopyga Roewer, 1947 | - | - | Taitoinae |
| Eucynortella Roewer, 1912 | Cosmetinae | Cosmetinae: "Cyno." | Taitoinae |
| Pygocynorta Roewer, 1925 | - | - | Taitoinae |
| Taito Kury & Barros, 2014 | - | - | Taitoinae |
| Vononana Roewer, 1928 | - | - | Taitoinae |
| Vononoides Roewer, 1912 | - | - | Taitoinae |

The following genera are recognised, but unplaced in a subfamily:

- Abria Sørensen, 1932
- Acantholibitia Mello-Leitão, 1928
- Anduzeia González-Sponga, 1992
- Bokwina Goodnight & Goodnight, 1947
- Boneta Goodnight & Goodnight, 1944
- Caracarana Roewer, 1956
- Caurimare González-Sponga, 1992
- Cocholla Roewer, 1928
- Colima Goodnight & Goodnight, 1945
- Corosalia González-Sponga, 1998
- Cynortellana Roewer, 1923
- Cynortellina Roewer, 1915
- Cynortellula Roewer, 1925
- Cynortesta Roewer, 1947
- Cynortetta Roewer, 1947
- Cynortoperna Roewer, 1947
- Cynortosoma Roewer, 1947
- Cynortula Roewer, 1912
- Erginiperna Roewer, 1947
- Erginoides Pickard-Cambridge, 1904
- Eucynortoides Roewer, 1912
- Eucynortula Roewer, 1912
- Eugnidia Roewer, 1947
- Eulibitia Roewer, 1912
- Eupoecilaema Roewer, 1917
- Frizellia Mello-Leitão, 1941
- Gnidia Koch, 1839
- Guaricia González-Sponga, 1992
- Guatopia González-Sponga, 1992
- Gueroma Goodnight & Goodnight, 1942
- Heterovonones Roewer, 1912
- Kevonones Chamberlin, 1925
- Libitioides Roewer, 1912
- Libitiosoma Roewer, 1947
- Litoralia González-Sponga, 1992
- Maniapure González-Sponga, 1992
- Metacynorta Pickard-Cambridge, 1904
- Metacynortoides Roewer, 1912
- Metavonones Pickard-Cambridge, 1904
- Meterginoides Roewer, 1912
- Meterginulus Roewer, 1912
- Michella Goodnight & Goodnight, 1942
- Moselabius Roewer, 1956
- Namballeus Roewer, 1952
- Neocynorta Roewer, 1915
- Opisthopristis Roewer, 1952
- Palpinus Pickard-Cambridge, 1905
- Paracynorta Goodnight & Goodnight, 1942
- Pararhauculus Roewer, 1933
- Paravonones Pickard-Cambridge, 1904
- Pebasia Roewer, 1947
- Pelechucia Roewer, 1947
- Perugnidiella Cianferoni & Ceccolini, 2021
- Poala Goodnight & Goodnight, 1942
- Portachuelo González-Sponga, 2003
- Prasiana Strand, 1942
- Proerginus Roewer, 1917
- Prosontes Goodnight & Goodnight, 1945
- Puerilia González-Sponga, 1992
- Qarikichkauru Medrano, Kury & Mendes, 2021
- Reimoserius Roewer, 1947
- Soaresella Goodnight & Goodnight, 1947
- Socotabius Roewer, 1957
- Spongaobaria Özdikmen, 2008
- Syncynorta Roewer, 1947
- Tajumulcia Goodnight & Goodnight, 1947
- Tobotanus Roewer, 1957
- Vononella Roewer, 1925
- Vononissus Roewer, 1956
- Vononula Roewer, 1947
- Zaraxolia Strand, 1942
